= SNCF Class X 3800 =

French diesel railcars

SNCF X 3800
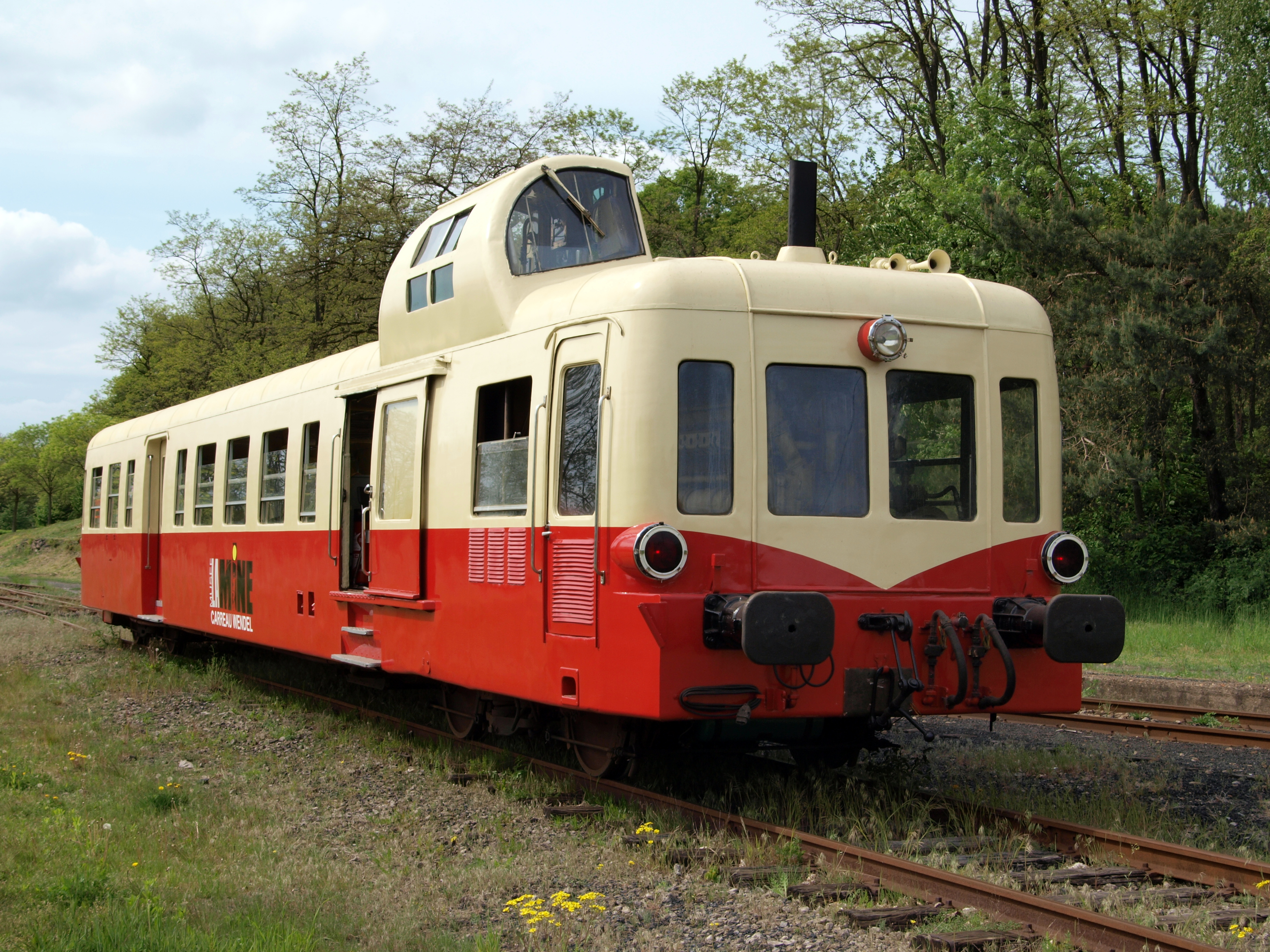
- Preserved example, unit number X4042, shown in 2009.
- Manufacturer: Renault / ANF / De Dietrich Ferroviaire / SACM
- Constructed: 1950–1961
- Number built: 251
- Fleet numbers: X 3801 – X 4051

Specifications
- Car length: 21.851 metres (71 ft 8 1/4 in) over buffers
- Width: 3.090 metres (10 ft 1 5/8 in)
- Height: 3.952 metres (12 ft 11 5/8 in)
- Wheel diameter: 860 mm (33.86 in)
- Maximum speed: 120 km/h (75 mph)
- Weight: 31.5 tonnes (31.0 long tons; 34.7 short tons)
- Prime mover: Saurer BZDSe or Renault
- Engine type: Diesel
- Power output: 250 kW (335 hp)
- Transmission: mechanical
- UIC classification: B′2′
- Bogies: Motor: Y 107; Trailer: Y 108
- Track gauge: 1,435 mm (4 ft 8 1/2 in)

The SNCF X 3800 class are diesel railcars with an elevated off-center control cabin. It is often said that they were nicknamed “Picassos” because the off-center cabin was reminiscent of paintings by Pablo Picasso featuring faces where the eyes and nose were completely offset. The nickname may though have come from the number of early paint schemes applied to the class.

The X3800 served on secondary lines all over the French rail network. The elevated control cabin allowed the railcars to operate in forward and reverse modes, allowing for ease of operation. One example is preserved at the Cité du Train.

== Technical Details ==
The X 3800 featured a mechanical transmission with a truck-type clutch and gearbox. The units had a 20 m (65 ft 7 in) long carbody that rested on two bogies, and weighed 34 tonnes. They ran at speeds of up to 110 km/h (68 mph) (with 120 kilometres per hour or 75 miles per hour possible). They could haul unpowered trailers and could be operated singly or twinned with other units. The direct mechanical engine controls required each powered unit to have its own driver so they could not be operated as true multiple units. Units were built with two types of diesel engines: Renault 517 diesel-powered units 3801 to 3835 and a Saurer BZDS diesel units 3836 to 3856.

The units were designed to be robust and simple (but were noisy), often parked outside in the winter. The driver sat facing sideways in a raised cabin above the engine compartment, accessed from the baggage compartment. The main mechanical controls were directly connected by levers to the diesel engine, clutch and gearbox. The units were widely used from the 1950s to the 1980s, particularly on secondary lines with often poorer quality track than the main lines, at a lower cost than comparable steam trains of the era. The units were reliable and, from the end opposite the engine compartment, offered passengers a wide-open view of the track. The diesel engines produced 300 hp and were water-cooled. The X 3800 burned 50–55 litres of diesel fuel per 100 km (5.1–5.1 mpg_{‑imp}; 4.3–4.3 mpg_{‑US}), giving the unit a range of about 700 kilometres (430 mi). The car bodies were of welded construction.

The X 3800 were built from 1950 to 1961. 251 units were built, given unit numbers X 3801 to X 4051 by the SNCF. Each X 3800 could hold 62 passengers, with smoking and non-smoking compartments, a toilet, and a baggage area located behind the engine compartment

== Routes Served ==
The X 3800 units were used on the majority of non-electrified lines across the entirety of France. Some of the routes served include:

- Laroche-Migennes - Corbigny
- Nantes - Saint-Nazaire
- Annemasse - Genève-Eaux-Vives (international service)
- Annemasse - Bellegarde
- Bellegarde - Divonne-les-Bains
- Montchanin - Besançon
- Besançon - Bourg-en-Bresse
- Lyon - Bourg-en-Bresse
- Valence - Grenoble - Chambéry - Aix-les-Bains
- Nevers - Montchanin - Le Creusot
- Épinal - Saint-Dié-des-Vosges
- Épinal - Remiremont
- Saintes - La Rochelle
- Nice - Cannes
- Caen - Argentan
- Nantes - Saint-Nazaire
- Poitiers - La Rochelle
- La Rochelle - Saintes
- Rouen - Le Havre
- Charleville-Mézières - Givet
- Belfort - Mulhouse
- Sarrebourg - Abreschviller
- Vierzon - Montluçon
- Nevers - Montchanin
- Cahors - Capdenac
- Cahors - Montauban
- Agen - Montauban
- Dinant - Charleville-Mézières (international service)
- Paris - Dreux
- Paris-Est - Sézanne (later Paris-Est - La Ferté-Gaucher)
- Navettes Freyming-Merlebach - Petite-Rosselle
- Navettes Paris-Est - Paris-Ourcq
- Villefranche - Perpignan
- Bollwiller - Lautenbach

== Base Depots ==
- Bordeaux (1975 - 28 May 1988)
- Chalindrey (1970 - 1980)
- Châlons-sur-Marne (1958 - 1969)
- Chalon-sur-Saône (1964 - 1973)
- Clermont-Ferrand (Since 1952)
- Douai (1954 - 1968)
- Evreux (Since 1958)
- La Plaine (1975 - 1985)
- La Rochelle - Bongraine (Transferred from Saintes, 1960 - 1976)
- Laroche-Migennes (1965 - 1972)
- Le Mans-Pontlieue (1951 - 1970)
- Limoges (Since 1951)
- Longueau (1970 - 1977)
- Lyon-Perrache (1952, transferred to Lyon-Vaise in 1957)
- Lyon-Vaise (Transferred from Lyon-Perrache, 1957 - 1980)
- Marseille-Blancarde (Transferred from Marseille-Saint-Charles, 1957 - 1975)
- Marseille-Saint-Charles (February 1955, transferred to Marseille-Blancarde in 1957)
- Mohon (1959 - May 1987)
- Nancy-Heillecourt (1951 - 1970)
- Nantes (Since 1951)
- Narbonne (Since 1958)
- Nevers (1970 - May 1987)
- Nice-Saint-Roch (September 1954 - 1961)
- Noisy-le-Sec (Since 1959)
- Rouen-Orléans (Since 1951)
- Rennes (1st base depot for the class with X 3801 delivered in 1950, active until 1980)
- Rouge-Barres, près de Lille (Since 1951)
- Saintes (1951 - 1960, then transferred to La Rochelle-Bongraine )
- Sotteville (1970 - 1987, except X 3997, staying until 2014)
- Tours-Saint-Pierre (1955 - 1967)
- Vesoul (Since 1951)
- Vitry-le-François (1953 - 1960)

== Notable Units ==
- X 3823 was seen in the film Les Vacances du petit Nicolas
- X 3953 was renumbered to X 93953 blue and white for the ligne de Bréauté - Beuzeville à Fécamp, then renumbered back to X 3953.
- X 3896 was rebuilt on the 23 of July, 1976, by the "Ateliers de Périgueux" into a rail inspection vehicle, replacing the X 42511. As a result, it received a green livery, underlined by grey lines. Since 1988, this unit has been used by the Service de la Recherche for work on the "ASTREE" project, an early iteration of the ERTMS signalling system.
- X 3900 underwent the same rebuilding as X 3896 in 1976. In 1993, it was purchased by "l'Autorail Touristique du Minervois", held at the Clermont-Ferrand depot before operating on behalf of the "Chemins de Fer de la Haute Auvergne" (Gentiane Express) in 1997. Since then, it has been stationed at Bort-les-Orgues (19) and is undergoing an exterior refurbishment.
- X 3997 was rebuilt into a SNCF maintenance vehicle, and received a green & grey livery with orange bands. Initially, it was used for signalling maintenance/installation, later being equipped with special rail resistance-detecting wheels. In the 1990s, it was used for shunting tasks.
- An engine of this class was seen in the movie Le Corniaud

== Preserved Units ==
=== Operating ===
- X 3814 : Train touristique de Puisaye-Forterre
- X 3817 : Chemin de fer touristique de la vallée de l'Aa (CFTVA)
- X 3823 : Chemin de Fer de la Vendée
- X 3824 : Association des Trains du Sud de la France (ATSF), on loan from Fédération des amis des chemins de fer secondaires
- X 3835 : Train touristique de Puisaye-Forterre
- X 3837 : Chemin de fer touristique de la Vallée de la Canner
- X 3850 : Chemin de Fer Touristique du Sud des Ardennes (CFTSA)
- X 3853 : Chemin de fer touristique de la vallée de l'Aa (CFTVA)
- X 3867 : Agrivap les trains de la découverte
- X 3890 : Chemin de fer du Centre-Bretagne (CFCB)
- X 3898 : Chemin de Fer Touristique du Sud des Ardennes (CFTSA)
- X 3926 : Tourisme Ferroviaire de la Brie Champenoise à l’Omoise (TFBCO)
- X 3943 : Chemin de Fer Touristique du Sud des Ardennes (CFTSA). Allowed to run on main lines at 120 km/h (75 mph).
- X 3944 : Train du Pays Cathare et du Fenouillèdes (TPCF)
- X 3953 : Chemin de fer touristique de la Sarthe
- X 3959 : Chemin de fer Charente-Limousine (CFCL) (undergoing restoration)
- X 3976 : Train touristique du centre-Var (ATTCV)
- X 3998 : Chemin de Fer à vapeur des Trois Vallées (Belgium)
- X 4001 : Chemin de Fer du Haut Forez (CFHF)
- X 4039 : Autorails de Bourgogne-Franche-Comté (ABFC). Allowed to run on main lines at 120 km/h (75 mph). Classified as a Monument historique.
- X 4046 : Autorail Lorraine Champagne Ardenne (ALCA), at Chemin de fer de la vallée de l'Eure (CFVE)

=== Non-operable or preserved for parts ===
- X 3801 : Chemin de Fer Touristique des Hautes Falaises in Tourville-les-Ifs (wreck)
- X 3818 : Chemin de Fer Touristique de la Traconne (purchased by the town of Sézanne (wreck))
- X 3825 : Cajarc train station, sold in 1998 to Quercyrail (engine removed)
- X 3838 : Chemin de Fer Touristique du Sud des Ardennes (CFTSA) (undergoing restoration)
- X 3847 : Cité du train, front third preserved - front compartment, engine and driver's cabin
- X 3866 : Dépôt-musée de Pont-Érambourg, on loan from Pacific Vapeur Club (PVC) (undergoing restoration)
- X 3886 : Autorails de Bourgogne-Franche-Comté (ABFC) (out of service since 2012). Classified as a Monument historique.
- X 3968 : Chemin de fer touristique du Haut Quercy (CFTHQ) (awaiting restoration)
- X 3871 : Train touristique de Puisaye-Forterre (used for spare parts)
- X 3876 : Private property in Lanester (transformed into a cottage)
- X 3900 : Gentiane express (undergoing restoration)
- X 4042 : Carreau Wendel Museum (out of service)

=== Scrapped ===
- X 3810 : Train touristique du centre-Var (Scrapped in 2024)
- X 3846 : Autorail Touristique du Minervois (ATM) (Scrapped in July 2012)
- X 3865 : Train touristique de l'Ardèche méridionale (Scrapped in July 2010).
- X 3897 : Association du Chemin de Fer Touristique de l’Aubois (ACTA) - stationed at Montmirail (wrecked and scrapped in 2018)
- X 3907 : Train Touristique Étretat-Pays de Caux (Scrapped in January 2014)
- X 3934 : Agrivap (Severely damaged in a 1998 collision, select pieces recovered, chassis scrapped)
- X 3937 : Association de modélistes Rambolitrain, Rambouillet (scrapped in 2011, motor purchased by Agrivap)
- X 3971 : private property, sold in 1995 to Chemin de Fer de Vendée - stationned at Elbeuf (used for spare parts, scrapped around 2005)
- X 3989 : Train touristique de l'Ardèche méridionale (scrapped in July 2010)
- X 3997 : Rail inspection vehicle (sent to the Culoz demolition facility in February 2014)
- X 4013 : Served as a locker room for a night club in the old Sancerre station (scrapped)
- X 4025 : Autorails de Bourgogne-Franche-Comté (ABFC) (scrapped in 2001)
- X 4028 : Autorail Touristique du Minervois (ATM) - stationned at Narbonne (scrapped in March 2013)
- X 4051 : Société générale de chemins de fer et de transports automobiles (CFTA) in Carhaix (scrapped)

== Model Renditions ==
This unit has been represented in HO scale by the Jouef, LS Models, Mistral Trains Models groups and the Editions Atlas (static), as well as N scale by Transmondia. In O scale, AMJL offered Picasso kits or assembled.

== Anecdotes ==
X 4046 preserved by l'association Autorail Lorraine Champagne-Ardenne, served as the setting for the song by Laurent Voulzy, "Paradoxal Système" in 1992.
