= List of SNCF stations in Grand Est =

This article contains a list of current SNCF railway stations in the Grand Est region of France.

== Ardennes (08) ==
- Amagne-Lucquy
- Anchamps
- Aubrives
- Bogny-sur-Meuse
- Carignan
- Charleville-Mézières
- Deville
- Donchery
- Fépin
- Fumay
- Givet
- Haybes
- Joigny-sur-Meuse
- Laifour
- Liart
- Lumes
- Mohon
- Monthermé
- Nouvion-sur-Meuse
- Nouzonville
- Poix-Terron
- Rethel
- Revin
- Sedan
- Vireux-Molhain
- Vrigne-Meuse

== Aube (10) ==
- Bar-sur-Aube
- Nogent-sur-Seine
- Romilly-sur-Seine
- Troyes
- Vendeuvre-sur-Barse

== Bas-Rhin (67) ==
- Barr
- Benfeld
- Bischheim
- Bischoffsheim
- Bischwiller
- Bourg-Bruche
- Brumath
- Dachstein
- Dambach-la-Ville
- Dettwiller
- Diemeringen
- Dorlisheim
- Drusenheim
- Duppigheim
- Duttlenheim
- Ebersheim
- Eichhoffen
- Entzheim-Aéroport
- Epfig
- Erstein
- Fegersheim
- Fouday
- Gambsheim
- Geispolsheim
- Gertwiller
- Goxwiller
- Graffenstaden
- Gresswiller
- Gundershoffen
- Haguenau
- Heiligenberg-Mollkirch
- Herrlisheim
- Hochfelden
- Hoelschloch
- Hœnheim
- Hœrdt
- Hoffen
- Hunspach
- Ingwiller
- Kilstett
- Kogenheim
- Krimmeri-Meinau
- Kurtzenhouse
- Lauterbourg
- Limersheim
- Lingolsheim
- Lutzelhouse
- Marienthal
- Matzenheim
- Mertzwiller
- Molsheim
- Mommenheim
- Mothern
- Mullerhof
- Munchhausen
- Mundolsheim
- Mutzig
- Niederbronn-les-Bains
- Obermodern
- Obernai
- Oermingen
- Reichshoffen-Ville
- Riedseltz
- Rœschwoog
- Roppenheim
- Rosheim
- Rothau
- Rountzenheim
- Russ-Hersbach
- Saales
- Saint-Blaise-la-Roche-Poutay
- Saulxures
- Saverne
- Scherwiller
- Schirmeck-La Broque
- Schweighouse-sur-Moder
- Schwindratzheim
- Sélestat
- Seltz
- Sessenheim
- Soultz-sous-Forets
- Steinbourg
- Stephansfeld
- Strasbourg-Roethig
- Strasbourg-Ville
- Tieffenbach-Struth
- Urmatt
- Vendenheim
- Walbourg
- La Wantzenau
- Weyersheim
- Wilwisheim
- Wingen-sur-Moder
- Wisches
- Wissembourg

== Haute-Marne (52) ==
- Bayard
- Bologne
- Chaumont
- Chevillon
- Culmont–Chalindrey
- Donjeux
- Eurville
- Froncles
- Fronville-Saint-Urbain
- Gudmont
- Joinville
- Langres
- Saint-Dizier
- Vignory
- Vraincourt-Viéville

== Haut-Rhin (68) ==
- Altkirch
- Bantzenheim
- Bartenheim
- Bitschwiller
- Bollwiller
- Breitenbach
- Cernay (Haut-Rhin)
- Colmar
- Colmar-Mésanges
- Colmar-Saint-Joseph
- Dannemarie
- Fellering
- Flaxlanden
- Graffenwald
- Gunsbach-Griesbach
- Habsheim
- Herrlisheim-près-Colmar
- Illfurth
- Ingersheim Cité Scolaire
- Kruth
- Logelbach
- Luttenbach-près-Munster
- Lutterbach
- Merxheim
- Metzeral
- Montreux-Vieux
- Moosch
- Muhlbach-sur-Munster
- Mulhouse-Dornach
- Mulhouse-Ville
- Munster
- Munster-Badischhof
- Oderen
- Raedersheim
- Ranspach
- Richwiller
- Rixheim
- Rouffach
- Saint-Amarin
- Saint-Gilles
- Saint-Louis
- Saint-Louis-la-Chaussée
- Sierentz
- Staffelfelden
- Thann
- Thann-Centre
- Thann-Saint-Jacques
- Turckheim
- Vieux-Thann
- Vieux-Thann-ZI
- Walbach
- Walheim
- Wesserling
- Wihr-au-Val-Soultzbach
- Willer sur Thur
- Zillisheim

== Marne (51) ==
- Avenay
- Ay
- Bazancourt
- Bouy
- Breuil-Romain
- Châlons-en-Champagne
- Champagne-Ardenne TGV
- Courcy-Brimont
- Dormans
- Épernay
- Fismes
- Franchet d'Esperey
- Germaine
- Jonchery-sur-Vesle
- Loivre
- Magneux-Courlandon
- Montbré
- Mourmelon-le-Petit
- Muizon
- Prunay
- Reims
- Reims-Maison-Blanche
- Rilly-la-Montagne
- Saint-Hilaire-au-Temple
- Sainte-Menehould
- Sept-Saulx
- Sillery
- Trois-Puits
- Val-de-Vesle
- Vitry-le-François

== Meurthe-et-Moselle (54) ==
- Auboué
- Audun-le-Roman
- Azerailles
- Baccarat
- Bayon
- Belleville
- Bertrichamps
- Blainville-Damelevières
- Champigneulles
- Chenevières
- Conflans-Jarny
- Dieulouard
- Dombasle-sur-Meurthe
- Einvaux
- Fontenoy-sur-Moselle
- Foug
- Frouard
- Hatrize
- Homécourt
- Houdemont
- Igney-Avricourt
- Jarville-la-Malgrange
- Jœuf
- Laneuveville-devant-Nancy
- Liverdun
- Longuyon
- Longwy
- Ludres
- Lunéville
- Marbache
- Ménil-Flin
- Messein
- Mont-sur-Meurthe
- Nancy-Ville
- Neuves-Maisons
- Onville
- Pagny-sur-Moselle
- Pompey
- Pont-à-Mousson
- Pont-Saint-Vincent
- Rosières-aux-Salines
- Saint-Clément-Laronxe
- Thiaville
- Toul
- Valleroy-Moineville
- Vandières
- Varangéville-Saint-Nicolas

== Meuse (55) ==
- Bar-le-Duc
- Baroncourt
- Clemont-en-Argonne
- Commercy
- Étain
- Les Islettes
- Meuse TGV
- Montmédy
- Nançois-Tronville
- Pagny-sur-Meuse
- Revigny
- Verdun

== Moselle (57) ==
- Ancy-sur-Moselle
- Anzeling
- Apach
- Ars-sur-Moselle
- Audun-le-Tiche
- Basse-Ham
- Bénestroff
- Béning
- Berthelming
- Bouzonville
- Courcelles-sur-Nied
- Distroff
- Ébersviller
- Farébersviller
- Farschviller
- Faulquemont
- Forbach
- Freistroff
- Gandrange-Amnéville
- Hagondange
- Hayange
- Herny
- Hettange-Grande
- Hombourg-Budange
- Hombourg-Haut
- Hundling
- Kalhausen
- Kédange
- Kœnigsmacker
- Kuntzig
- Lorraine TGV
- Lutzelbourg
- Maizières-lès-Metz
- Metzervisse
- Metz-Nord
- Metz-Ville
- Morhange
- Moyeuvre-Grande
- Novéant
- Peltre
- Réding
- Rémilly
- Richemont
- Rombas-Clouange
- Saint-Avold
- Sanry-sur-Nied
- Sarrebourg
- Sarreguemines
- Sierck-les-Bains
- Téting
- Thionville
- Uckange
- Volmerange-les-Mines
- Walygator-Parc
- Wittring
- Woippy
- Yutz

== Vosges (88) ==
- Arches
- Bains-les-Bains
- Bruyères
- Charmes (Vosges)
- Châtel-Nomexy
- Contrexéville
- Éloyes
- Épinal
- Étival-Clairefontaine
- Igney
- Neufchâteau
- Pouxeux
- Provenchères-sur-Fave
- Raon-l'Étape
- Remiremont
- Saint-Dié-des-Vosges
- Saint-Michel-sur-Meurthe
- Saint-Nabord
- Thaon
- Vincey
- Vittel
- Xertigny

== See also ==
- SNCF
- List of SNCF stations for SNCF stations in other regions
