= Pouxeux station =

French railway station

Pouxeux
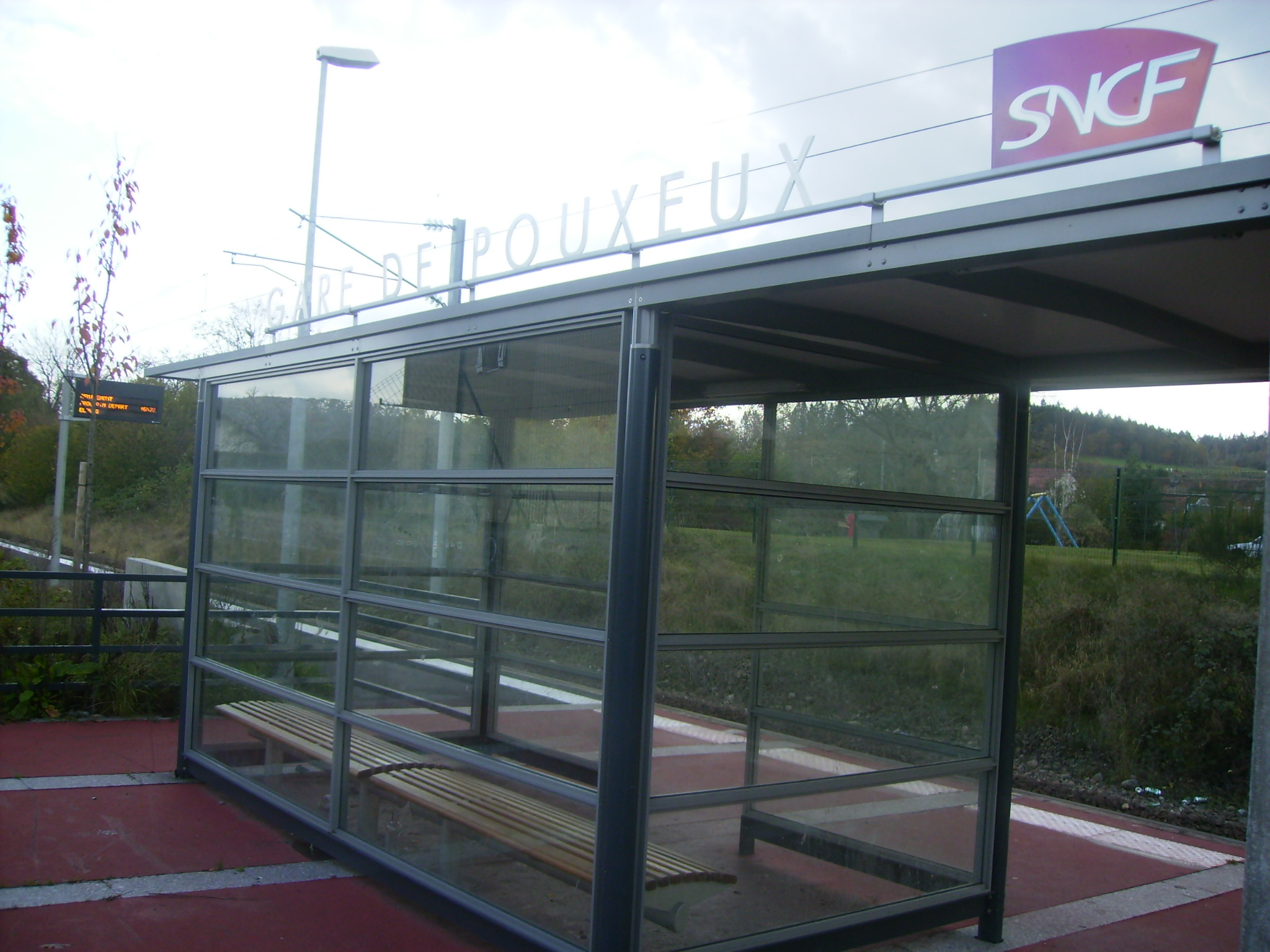

General information
- Location: Rue de la Moselle; 88550 Pouxeux; Vosges, France
- Coordinates: 48.1088°N 6.5695°E
- Owner: SNCF
- Operator: SNCF
- Line: Épinal–Bussang railway
- Platforms: 1
- Tracks: 1

Other information
- Station code: 87144428

History
- Opened: 10 November 1864

Passengers
- 2018: 10 635

Services
Preceding station	TER Grand Est	Following station
Arches towards Nancy	L04	Éloyes towards Remiremont
Location

Pouxeux station (French: Gare de Pouxeux) is a railway station serving the commune of Pouxeux, Vosges department, France. The station is owned and operated by SNCF. It is served by TER Grand Est trains between Nancy and Remiremont (line L04) operated by the SNCF.

== Services ==
The station is not staffed nor equipped with automatic ticket distributors.

== See also ==
- List of SNCF stations in Grand Est
