= Éloyes station =

Railway station in Grand Est, France

Coordinates: 48°05′13″N 6°36′00″E

Éloyes
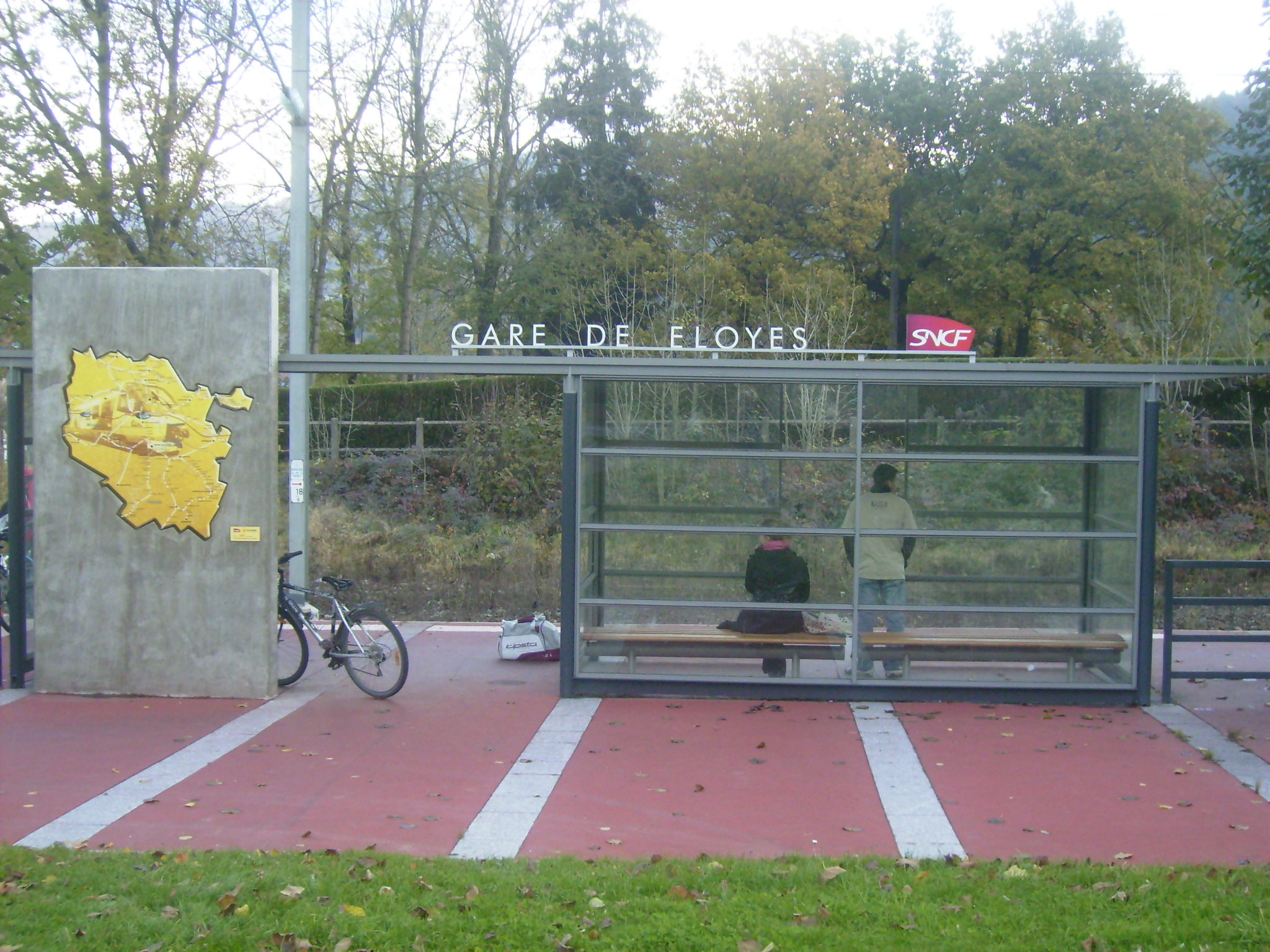

General information
- Location: Rue de la Gare; 88510 Éloyes; Vosges, France
- Owner: SNCF
- Operator: SNCF
- Platforms: 1
- Tracks: 1

Other information
- Station code: 87144436

History
- Opened: 10 November 1864

Passengers
- 2018: 25,630

Services
Preceding station	TER Grand Est	Following station
Pouxeux towards Nancy	L04	Saint-Nabord towards Remiremont
Location

Éloyes station (French: Gare d'Éloyes) is a railway station serving the commune of Éloyes, Vosges department, France. The station is owned and operated by SNCF. It is served by TER Grand Est trains between Nancy and Remiremont (line L04) operated by the SNCF.

== See also ==
- List of SNCF stations in Grand Est
