= Arches station =

French railway station

Coordinates: 48°07′11″N 6°31′42″E

Arches
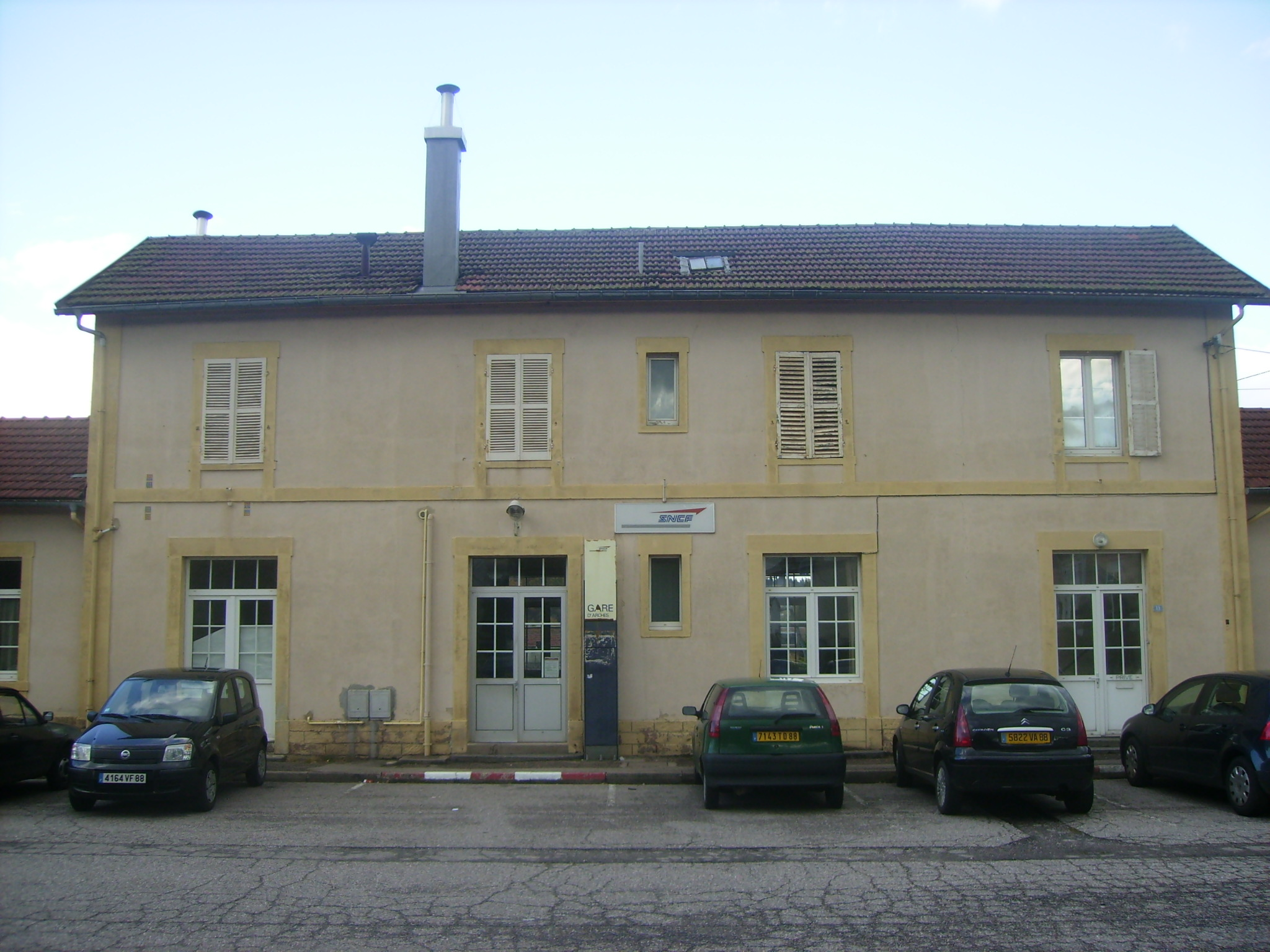

General information
- Location: Rue de la Gare; 88380 Arches; Vosges, France
- Owner: SNCF
- Operator: SNCF
- Lines: Épinal–Bussang railway Arches–Saint-Dié railway
- Platforms: 2
- Tracks: 2 (+ service tracks)

Construction
- Parking: 74

Other information
- Station code: 87144410

History
- Rebuilt: 2010

Passengers
- 2018: 51,087

Services
| Preceding station | TER Grand Est | Following station |
|---|---|---|
| Bruyères towards Strasbourg | A08 | Épinal Terminus |
| Épinal towards Nancy | L04 | Pouxeux towards Remiremont |
Location

Arches station (French: Gare d'Arches) is a railway station serving the commune of Arches, Vosges department, France. The station is owned and operated by SNCF, in the TER Grand Est regional rail network and is served by TER trains.

== See also ==
- List of SNCF stations in Grand Est
