= Arches–Saint-Dié railway =

Overview
- Status: Temporarily closed
- Owner: SNCF
- Locale: France (Grand Est)
- Termini: Arches; Saint-Dié-des-Vosges

Service
- Operator(s): SNCF

History
- Opened: 1869-1876
- Closed: 2018
- Reopened: 2022 (planned)

Technical
- Line length: 49 km (30 mi)
- Number of tracks: 1 (previously double tracked)
- Track gauge: 1,435 mm (4 ft 8 1/2 in) standard gauge
- Electrification: Non-electrified

The railway from Arches to Saint-Dié is a French 49 km long railway that runs between the communes of Arches and Saint-Dié-des-Vosges. The entirety of the line is located in the department of Vosges in the Grand Est region.

Since 22 December 2018, traffic on the line has been suspended and replaced by bus service. In 2019, it was announced that the railway would undergo renovations with re-opening scheduled for 2022.

== History ==
=== Opening ===
The line was opened in four stages:

- 3 November 1869: Arches to Bruyères.
- 20 January 1870: Bruyères to Laveline.
- 11 July 1874: Laveline to La Chapelle.
- 7 October 1876: La Chappelle to Saint-Dié-des-Vosges.

== Route ==
The lines two main stations were its terminus points, along the way it served numerous small communes.

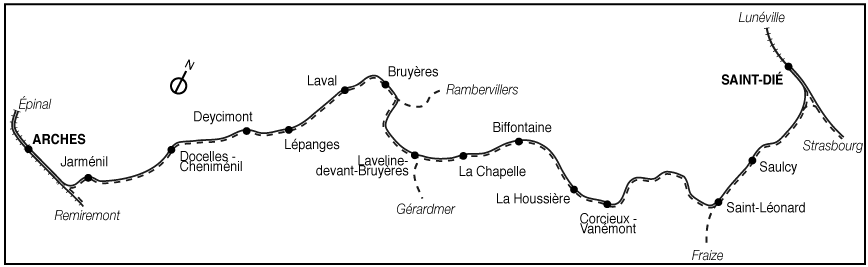
Route between Arches and Saint-Dié-des-Vosges that the railway takes.
