= Pouxeux =

- Commune
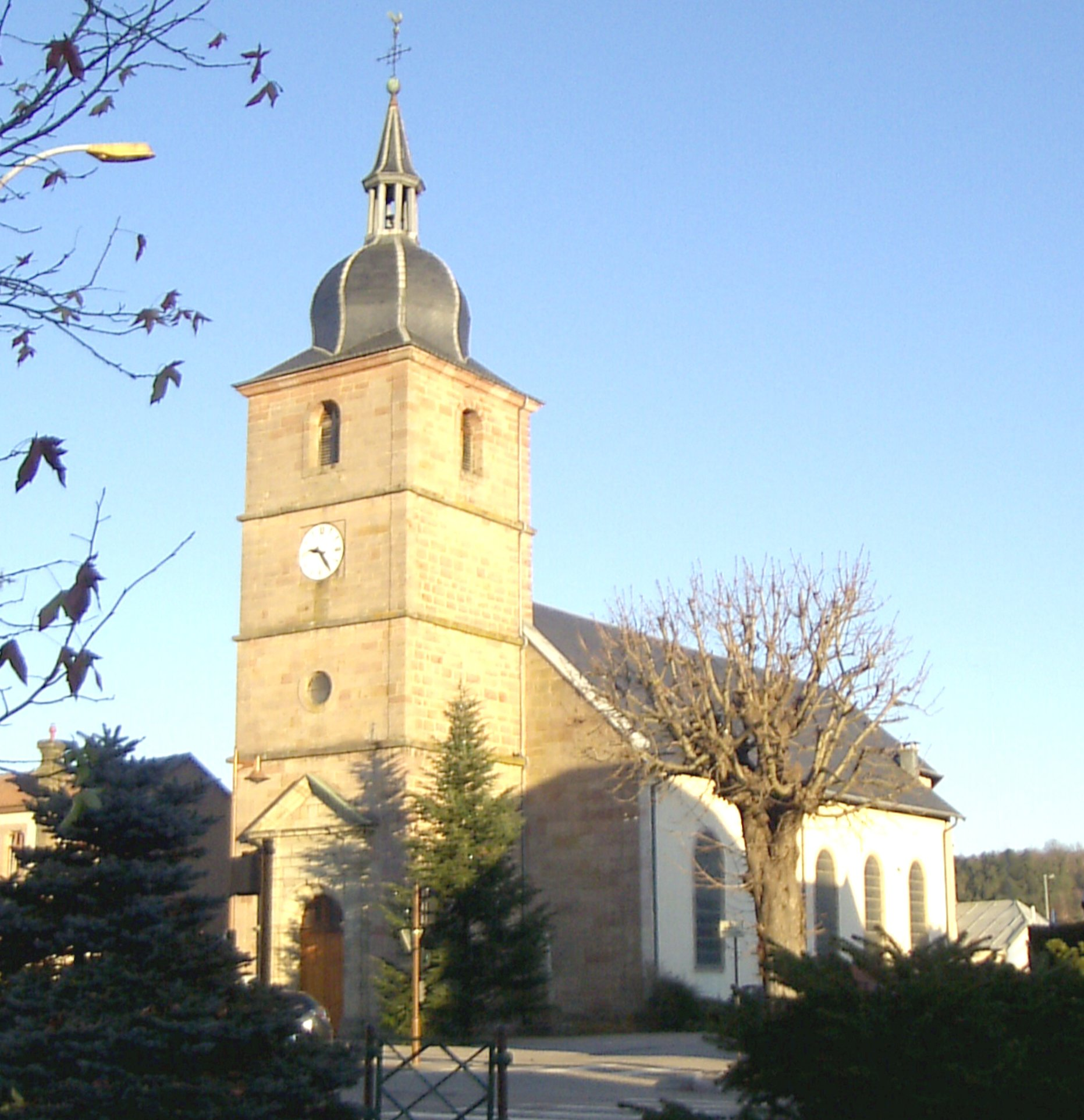
- Church of Saints Gorgon and Nabor
- Location of Pouxeux
- Location within France Location within Grand Est
- Coordinates: 48°06′30″N 6°34′02″E
- Country: France
- Region: Grand Est
- Department: Vosges
- Arrondissement: Épinal
- Canton: Remiremont
- Intercommunality: CA Épinal

Government
  - Mayor (2020–2026): Jean-Louis Thomas
- Area^{1}: 14.36 km^{2} (5.54 sq mi)
- Highest elevation: 583 m (1,913 ft)
- Lowest elevation: 347 m (1,138 ft)
- Population (2023): 1,947
  - Density: 135.6/km^{2} (351.2/sq mi)
- Time zone: UTC+01:00 (CET)
  - Summer (DST): UTC+02:00 (CEST)
- INSEE/Postal code: 88358 /88550
- ^{1} French Land Register data, which excludes lakes, ponds, glaciers > 1 km^{2} (0.386 sq mi or 247 acres) and river estuaries.

Pouxeux (French pronunciation: [puksø]) is a commune in the Vosges department in Grand Est in northeastern France.

Inhabitants are called Pexéens.

== Geography ==
Pouxeux lies on the left bank of the Moselle, opposite its confluence with the little river Vologne. Remiremont is 13 kilometres (8 mi) upstream to the south-southeast, and Épinal is 16 kilometres (10 mi) downstream to the northwest. Pouxeux station has rail connections to Épinal, Remiremont and Nancy.

== History ==
Before the French Revolution, Pouxeux fell within the territory of Arches, under the bailiwick of Remiremont. Its church, dedicated to Saints Gorgon and Nabor, was an annex to the church at Éloyes. Under the administrative arrangements introduced in 1790 the commune was part of the canton of Éloyes. The present administrative structure came into force some ten years later.

== See also ==
- Communes of the Vosges department
