= Saint-Nabord station =

French railway station

Coordinates: 48°02′45″N 6°34′54″E

Saint-Nabord
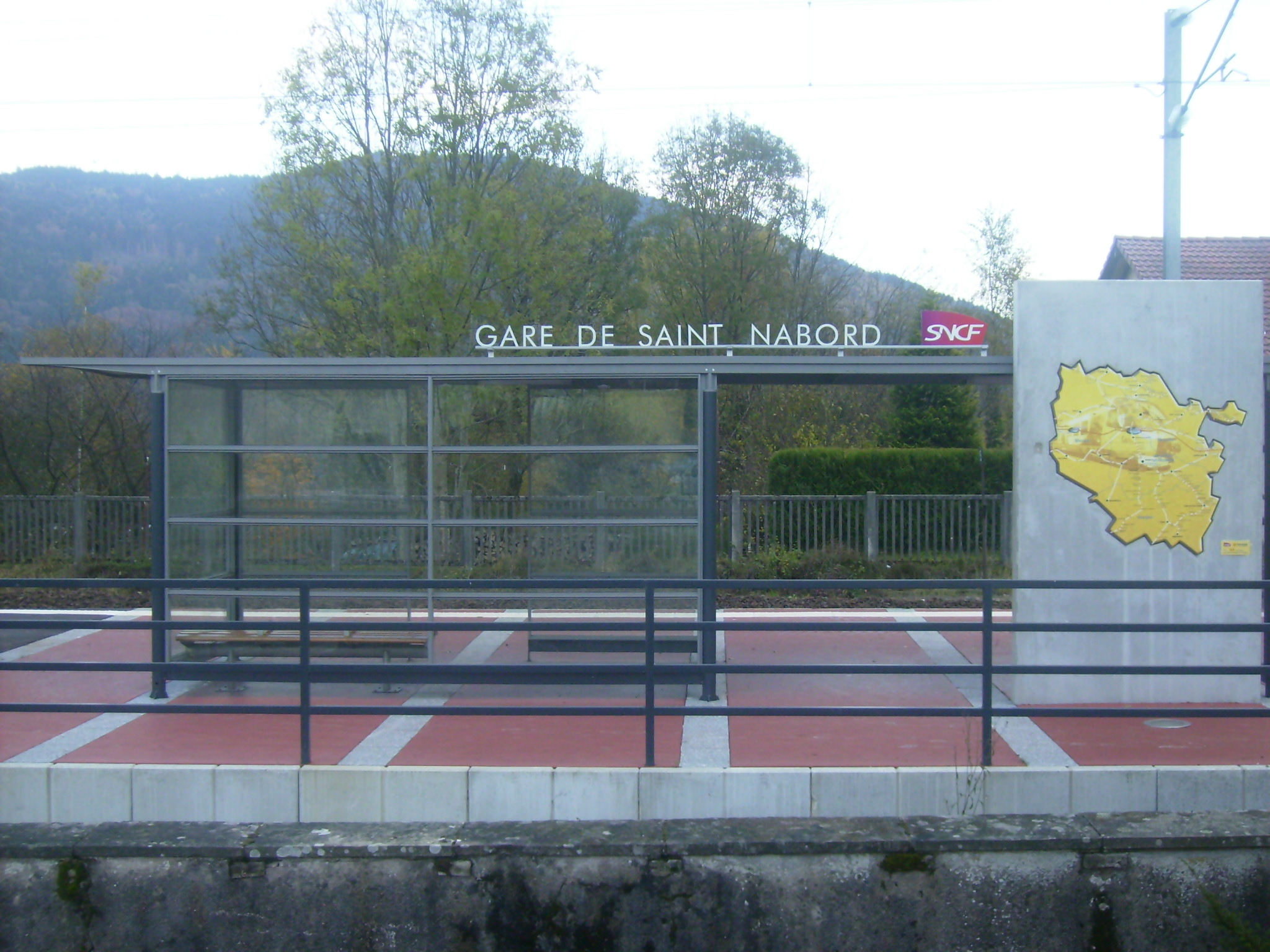

General information
- Location: Place de la Gare; 88200 Saint-Nabord; Vosges, France
- Owner: SNCF
- Operator: SNCF
- Platforms: 1
- Tracks: 1

Other information
- Station code: 87146217

History
- Opened: 10 November 1864

Passengers
- 2016: 3,945

Services
Preceding station	TER Grand Est	Following station
Éloyes towards Nancy	L04	Remiremont Terminus
Location

Saint-Nabord station (French: Gare de Saint-Nabord) is a railway station serving the commune of Saint-Nabord, Vosges department, France. The station is owned and operated by SNCF.

== Services ==
The station is served by TER Grand Est trains between Nancy and Remiremont (line L04) operated by the SNCF.

Outside of a small passenger waiting area, the station lacks any additional passenger amenities.

== See also ==
- List of SNCF stations in Grand Est
