= Xertigny station =

French railway station

Xertigny
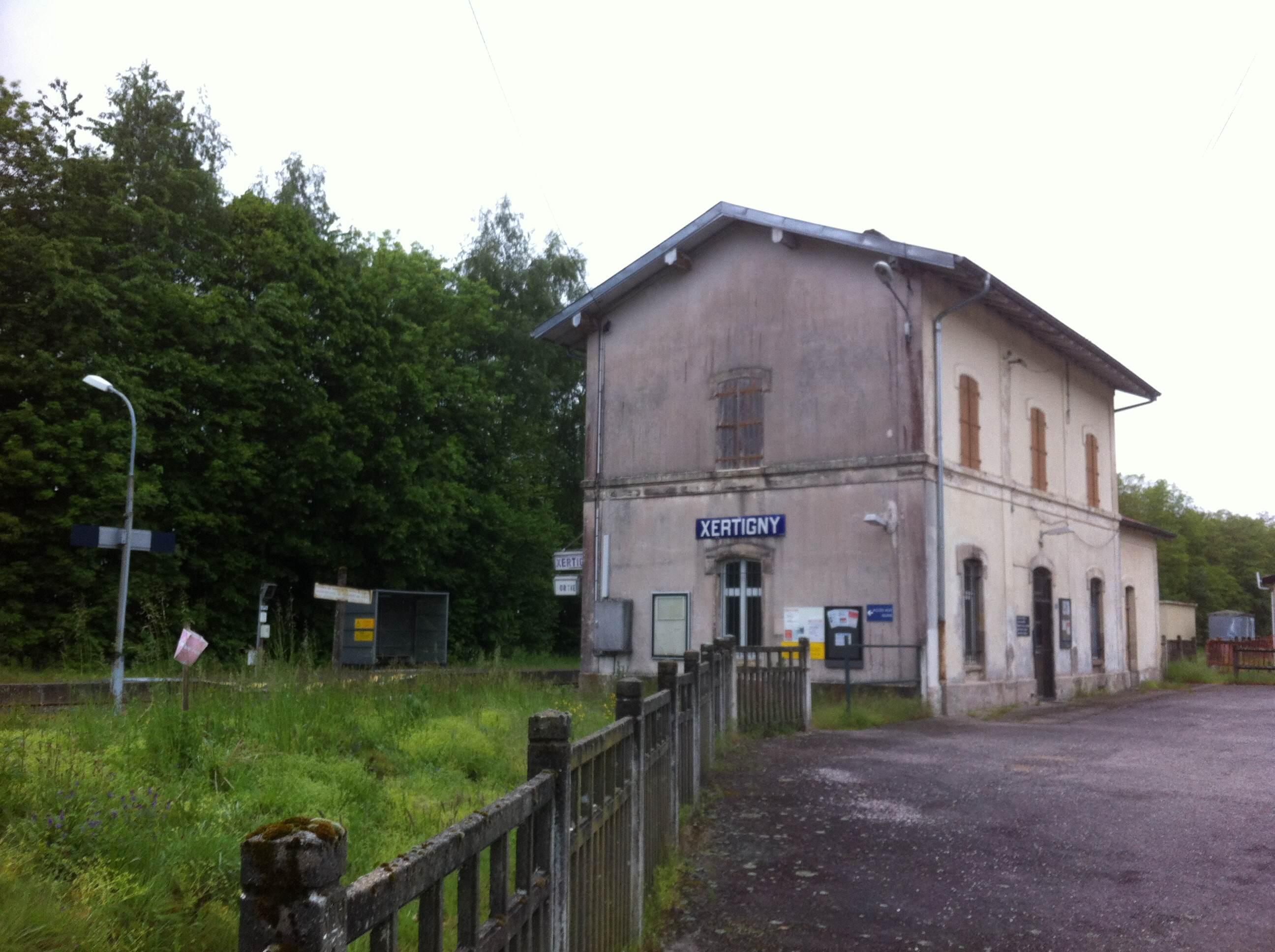
- Station building and platforms in 2015.

General information
- Location: Rue de la Gare; 88220 Xertigny; Vosges, France
- Coordinates: 48°03′11″N 6°22′36″E
- Owner: SNCF
- Operator: SNCF
- Platforms: 2
- Tracks: 2

Other information
- Station code: 87144121

History
- Opened: 24 September 1863

Passengers
- 2016: 1,036

Services
Preceding station	TER Grand Est	Following station
Épinal Terminus	L05	Bains-les-Bains towards Belfort
Location

Xertigny station (French: Gare de Xertigny) is a railway station serving the commune of Xertigny, Vosges department, France. It is located on the Blainville to Damelevières à Lure railway. The station is owned and operated by SNCF, in the TER Grand Est regional rail network and is served by TER trains.

== History ==
The train station was opened by the Compagnie des chemins de fer de l'Est on 24 September 1863, along with the section from Épinal to Aillevillers.

In 2018, the SNCF recorded 1,036 passenger movements through the station, a slight increase from the previous year of only 978.

== See also ==
- List of SNCF stations in Grand Est
