= Communauté de communes des Vosges Méridionales =

The Communauté de communes des Vosges Méridionales (before 2009: Communauté de communes des Trois Rivières) is a former administrative association of rural communes in the Vosges département of eastern France and in the region of Lorraine. It was created in December 1996. It was merged into the new Communauté de communes de la Porte des Vosges Méridionales in January 2017.

The association had its administrative offices at Le Val-d'Ajol.

== Composition ==
The Communauté de communes comprised the following communes:

- Le Val-d'Ajol
- Plombières-les-Bains
- Girmont-Val-d'Ajol

The grouping originally took its name from three small rivers:

- The Semouse (a 41 km long river which crosses the commune of Plombières-les-Bains at the hamlet of Ruaux)
- The Augronne (a 29 km long river which flows through the centre of Plombières-les-Bains)
- The Combeauté (a 37 km long river which has its source at Girmont-Val-d'Ajol and crosses Le Val-d'Ajol)
