= Saint-Étienne-lès-Remiremont =

Saint Etienne les Remiremont
- Commune
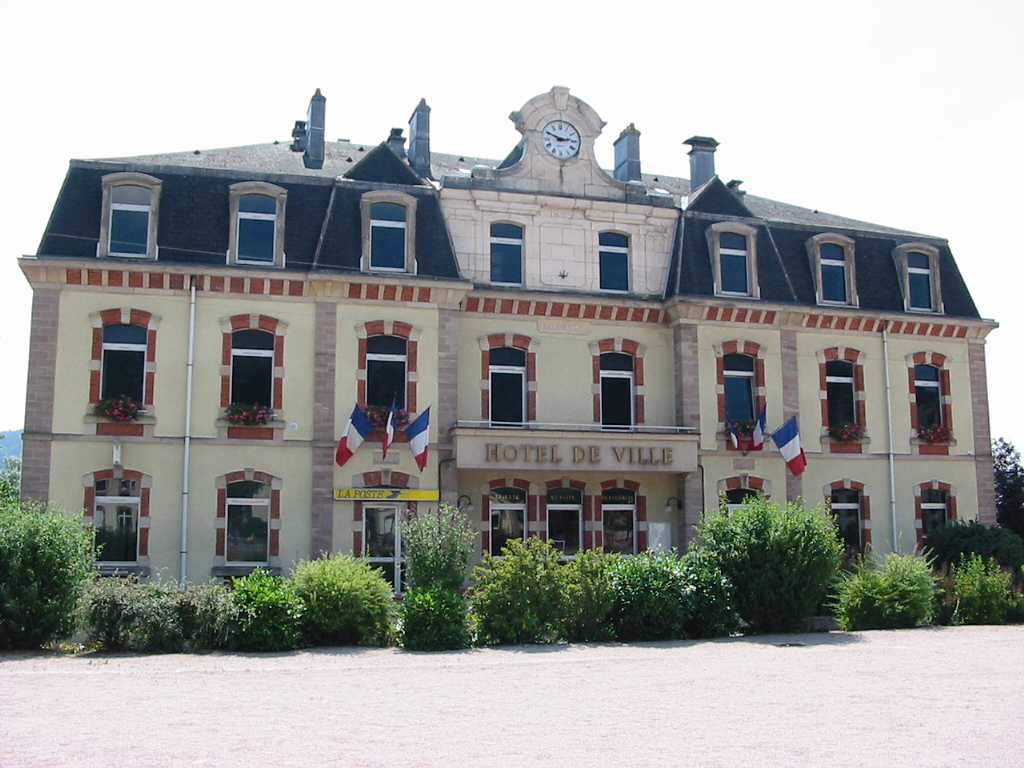
- The town hall in Saint-Étienne-lès-Remiremont

- Coat of arms
- Location of Saint Etienne les Remiremont
- Location within France Location within Grand Est
- Coordinates: 48°01′27″N 6°36′19″E
- Country: France
- Region: Grand Est
- Department: Vosges
- Arrondissement: Épinal
- Canton: Remiremont
- Intercommunality: CC Porte des Vosges Méridionales

Government
  - Mayor (2020–2026): Michel Demange
- Area^{1}: 33.81 km^{2} (13.05 sq mi)
- Elevation: 391 m (1,283 ft)
- Highest elevation: 819 m (2,687 ft)
- Lowest elevation: 370 m (1,210 ft)
- Population (2023): 3,818
  - Density: 112.9/km^{2} (292.5/sq mi)
- Time zone: UTC+01:00 (CET)
  - Summer (DST): UTC+02:00 (CEST)
- INSEE/Postal code: 88415 /88200
- ^{1} French Land Register data, which excludes lakes, ponds, glaciers > 1 km^{2} (0.386 sq mi or 247 acres) and river estuaries.

Saint-Étienne-lès-Remiremont (French pronunciation: [sɛ̃.t‿etjɛn lɛ ʁəmiʁmɔ̃], literally Saint-Étienne near Remiremont) is a commune in the Vosges department in Grand Est in northeastern France.

== Population ==
Historical population
| Year | Pop. | ±% p.a. |
|---|---|---|
| 1968 | 3,741 | — |
| 1975 | 3,936 | +0.73% |
| 1982 | 4,497 | +1.92% |
| 1990 | 4,085 | −1.19% |
| 1999 | 4,057 | −0.08% |
| 2007 | 3,899 | −0.50% |
| 2012 | 3,862 | −0.19% |
| 2017 | 3,840 | −0.11% |
| 2023 | 3,818 | −0.10% |
Source: INSEE

== See also ==
- Communes of the Vosges department
