= Cleurie =

- Commune
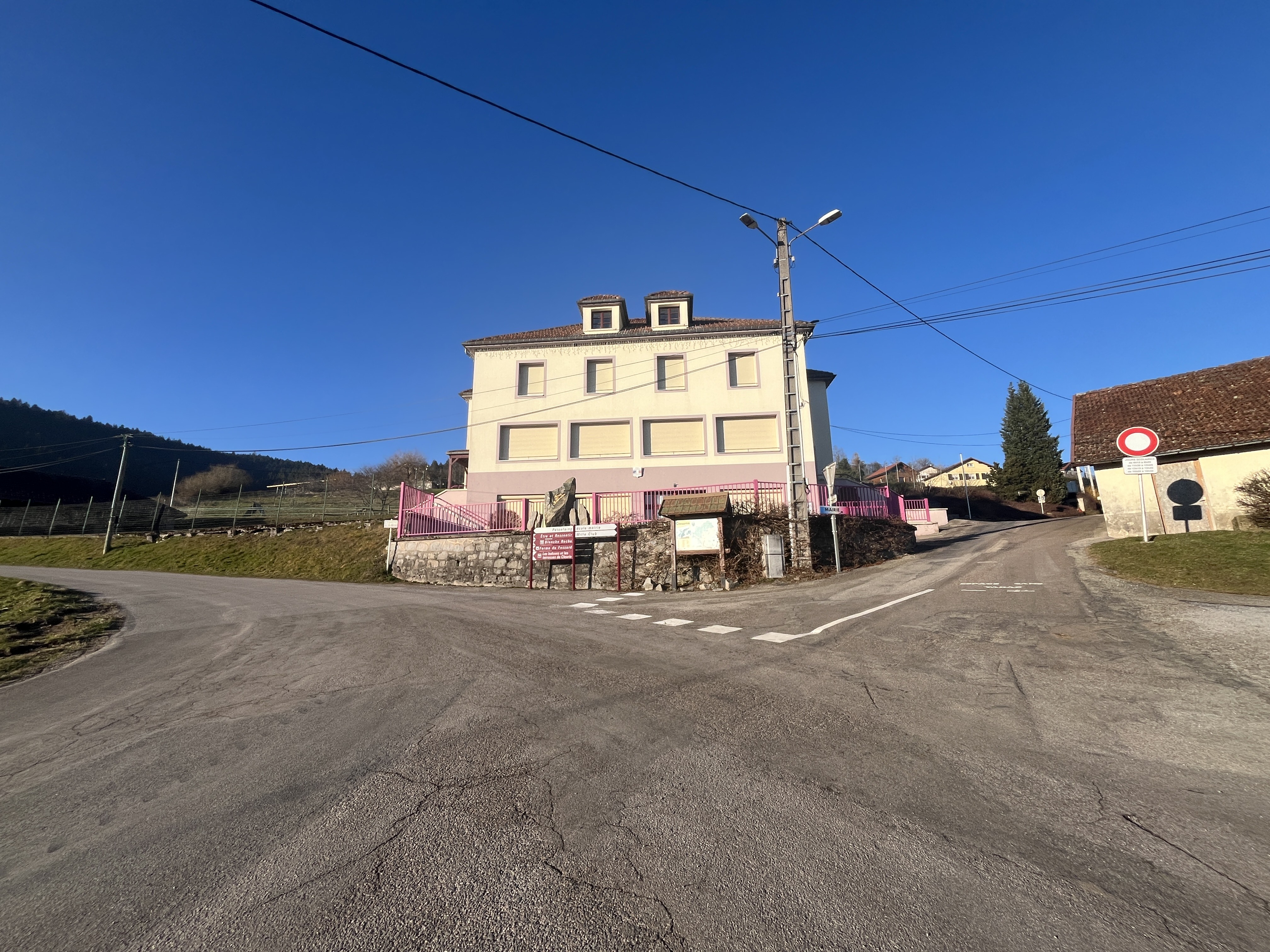
- Town hall and school

- Coat of arms
- Location of Cleurie
- Location within France Location within Grand Est
- Coordinates: 48°03′06″N 6°40′36″E
- Country: France
- Region: Grand Est
- Department: Vosges
- Arrondissement: Épinal
- Canton: Remiremont
- Intercommunality: CC Hautes Vosges

Government
  - Mayor (2020–2026): Patrick Lagarde
- Area^{1}: 11.04 km^{2} (4.26 sq mi)
- Highest elevation: 819 m (2,687 ft)
- Lowest elevation: 416 m (1,365 ft)
- Population (2023): 652
  - Density: 59.1/km^{2} (153/sq mi)
- Time zone: UTC+01:00 (CET)
  - Summer (DST): UTC+02:00 (CEST)
- INSEE/Postal code: 88109 /88120
- ^{1} French Land Register data, which excludes lakes, ponds, glaciers > 1 km^{2} (0.386 sq mi or 247 acres) and river estuaries.

Cleurie (French pronunciation: [klœʁi]) is a commune in the Vosges department in Grand Est in northeastern France.

== See also ==
- Communes of the Vosges department
