= Épinal–Bussang railway =

Railway in France between Épinal and Remiremont

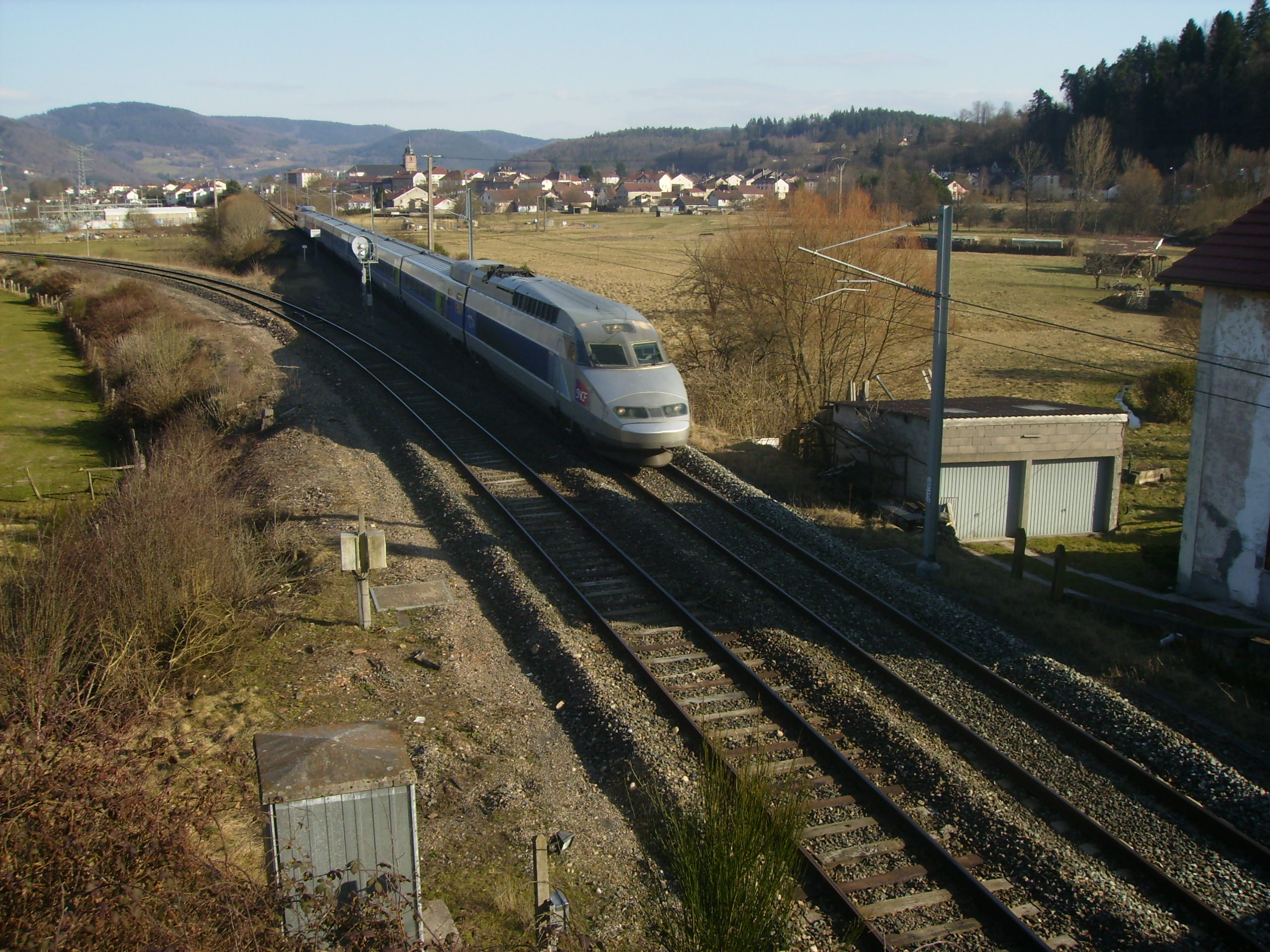

Overview
- Status: Operational
- Owner: SNCF
- Locale: France (Grand Est)
- Termini: Épinal station; Remiremont station

Service
- System: SNCF
- Operator(s): SNCF

History
- Opened: 1864 - 1891
- Closed: 1989 (partial closure)

Technical
- Line length: 56 km (35 mi)
- Number of tracks: Double track (Épinal to Arches); Single track (Arches to Remiremont)
- Track gauge: 1,435 mm (4 ft 8 1/2 in) standard gauge
- Electrification: 2005 (partial electrification)

The railway from Épinal–Bussang is a French 56 km long railway that runs between the cities of Épinal and Remiremont.

== Route ==
The Épinal–Bussang railway leaves the Gare d'Épinal, entering its terminus Gare de Remiremont after a total length of 56 km. Before 1989, it continued to Bussang. The railway runs along the Moselle river.

=== Main Stations ===
The Épinal–Bussang railway serves three main stations.

- Épinal station
- Arches station
- Remiremont station

== Infrastructure ==
The speed limit on the line is limited to 90 km/h due to the curvature of the Moselle river, which it runs along.

=== Partial electrification ===
The line was partially electrified (25 kV - 50 Hz) on 23 May 2005 between Épinal et Remiremont, in anticipation of TGV services which began on 10 June 2007. This coincided with the opening of the LGV Est.

== Rail services ==
The railway is used by SNCF train services part of both the TGV and TER Grand Est networks. The route between Remiremont and Bussang continues to be operated by a replacement bus service.
