= Reims-Maison-Blanche station =

Railway station in Reims, France

Reims Maison-Blanche
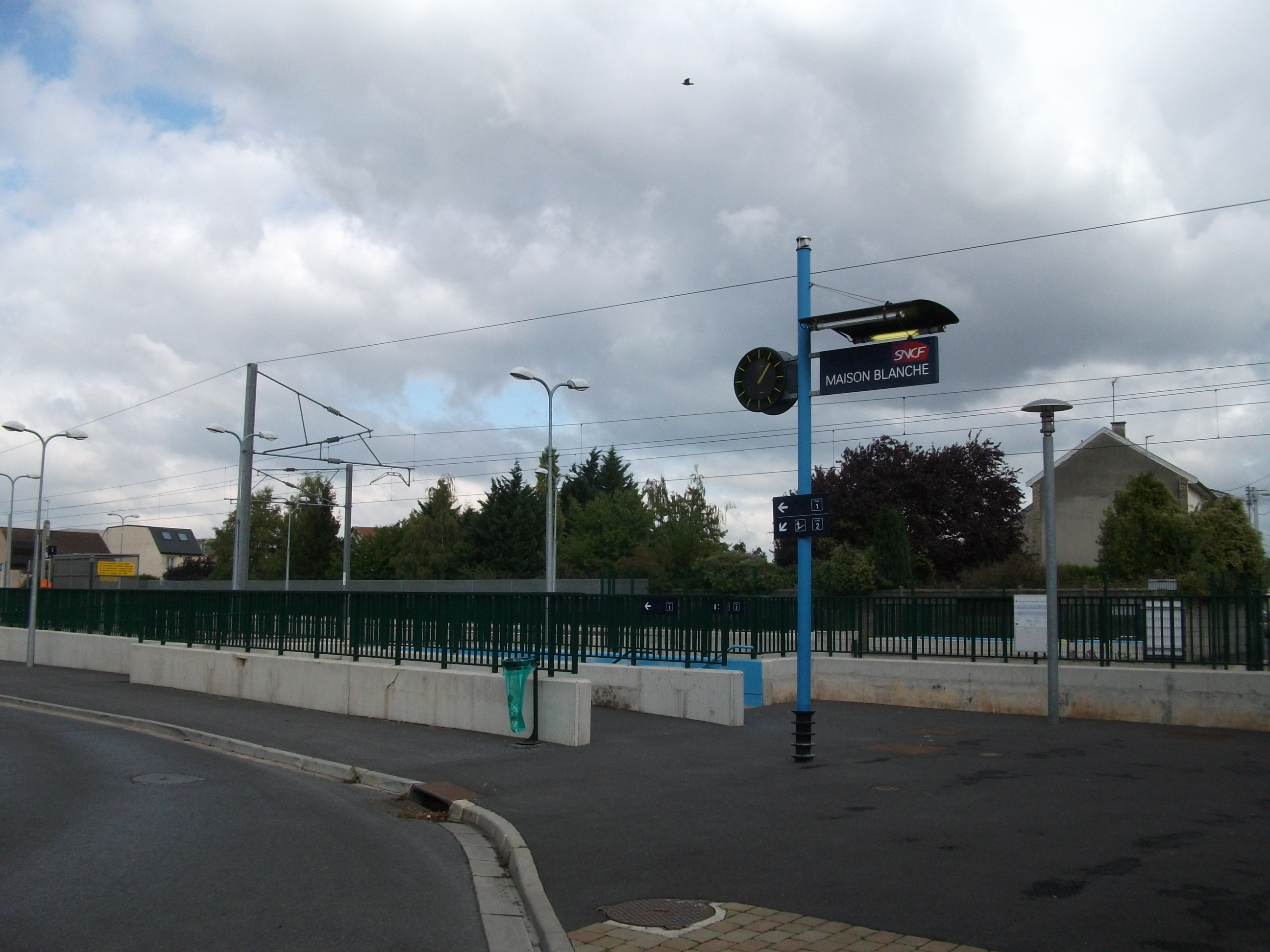

General information
- Location: 51100 Reims; Marne, France
- Coordinates: 49°14′01″N 4°01′21″E
- Elevation: 95 m (312 ft)
- Owner: SNCF
- Operator: SNCF
- Line: Épernay-Reims railway
- Distance: 168.524 km
- Platforms: 2
- Tracks: 2

Other information
- Station code: 87171272

Passengers
- 2018: 60,440

Services
Preceding station	TER Grand Est	Following station
Champagne-Ardenne TGV Terminus	C09	Franchet d'Esperey towards Reims
Rilly-la-Montagne towards Épernay	C09	Franchet d'Esperey towards Reims
Location

Reims-Maison-Blanche (French: Gare de Reims-Maison-Blanche) is a railway station in the city of Reims, Marne department, northern France. The station is located in the La Maison Blanche neighbourhood of the city. It is situated at kilometric point (KP) 168.524 on the Épernay-Reims railway and served by TER Grand Est trains operated by the SNCF.

== History ==
The station was renovated between 2006 and 2007 in preparation for the arrival of the TGV East European.

In 2018, the SNCF estimated that 60,440 passengers passed through the station.

== Train services ==
- Regional services (TER Grand Est C9) Épernay ... Champagne-Ardenne TGV ... Reims.

== See also ==
- List of SNCF stations in Grand Est
