= Xertigny =

- Commune
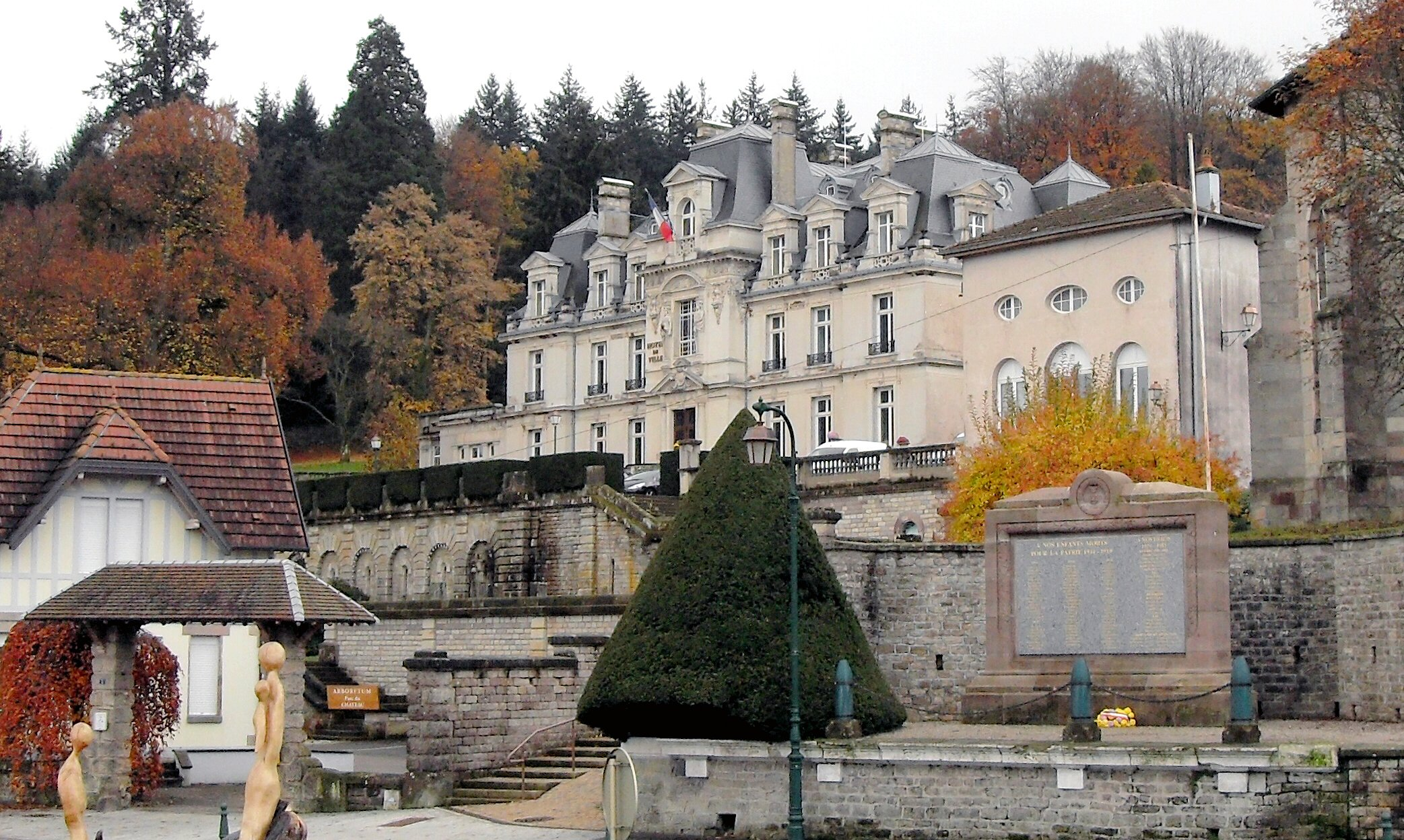
- Chateau of the Brasseurs

- Flag Coat of arms
- Location of Xertigny
- Location within France Location within Grand Est
- Coordinates: 48°02′46″N 6°24′24″E
- Country: France
- Region: Grand Est
- Department: Vosges
- Arrondissement: Épinal
- Canton: Le Val-d'Ajol
- Intercommunality: Épinal

Government
  - Mayor (2020–2026): Véronique Marcot
- Area^{1}: 50.25 km^{2} (19.40 sq mi)
- Elevation: 461 m (1,512 ft)
- Highest elevation: 617 m (2,024 ft)
- Lowest elevation: 297 m (974 ft)
- Population (2023): 2,589
  - Density: 51.52/km^{2} (133.4/sq mi)
- Time zone: UTC+01:00 (CET)
  - Summer (DST): UTC+02:00 (CEST)
- INSEE/Postal code: 88530 /88220
- Website: www.mairie-xertigny.fr
- ^{1} French Land Register data, which excludes lakes, ponds, glaciers > 1 km^{2} (0.386 sq mi or 247 acres) and river estuaries.

Xertigny (French pronunciation: [ɡzɛʁtiɲi]) is a commune in the Vosges department in Grand Est in northeastern France. Xertigny station has rail connections to Épinal, Lure and Belfort.

== Population ==
Historical population
Year	Pop.	±% p.a.
1968	3,224	—
1975	3,075	−0.67%
1982	3,190	+0.53%
1990	2,971	−0.89%
1999	2,810	−0.62%
2007	2,795	−0.07%
2012	2,745	−0.36%
2017	2,611	−1.00%
2023	2,589	−0.14%
Source: INSEE

== Geography ==
The Côney forms most of the commune's northwestern border.

== Points of interest ==
- Arboretum de Xertigny

== See also ==
- Communes of the Vosges department
