= Saint-Amé =

- Commune
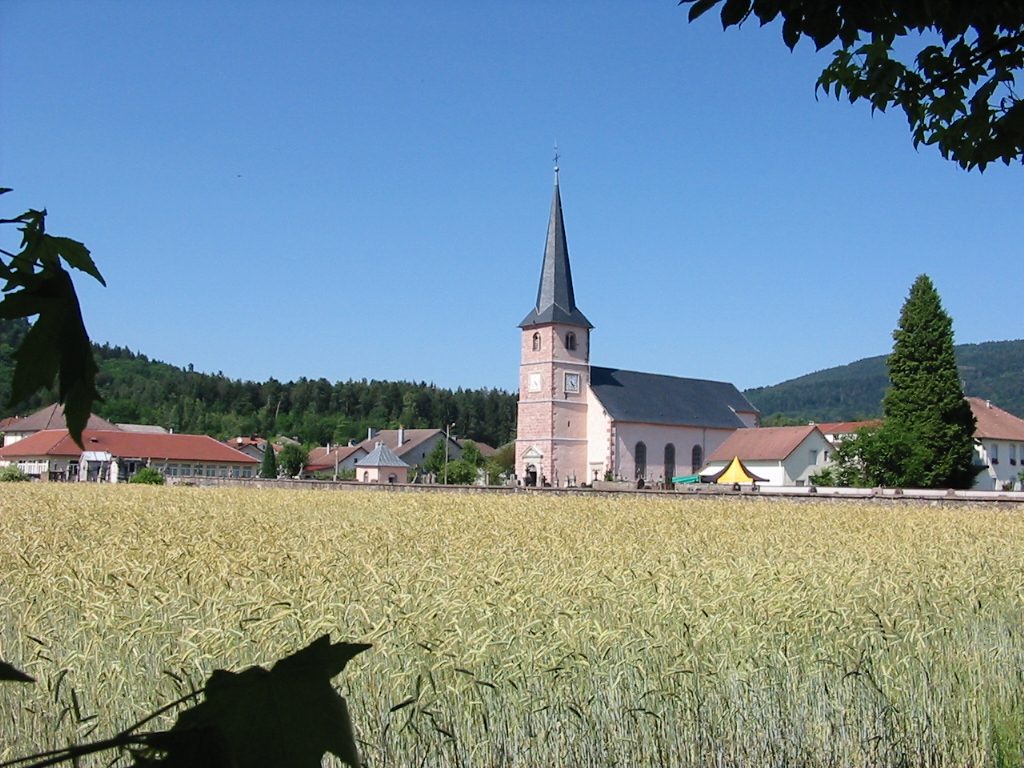
- A general view of Saint-Amé

- Coat of arms
- Location of Saint-Amé
- Location within France Location within Grand Est
- Coordinates: 48°01′32″N 6°40′14″E
- Country: France
- Region: Grand Est
- Department: Vosges
- Arrondissement: Épinal
- Canton: Remiremont
- Intercommunality: CC Porte des Vosges Méridionales

Government
  - Mayor (2020–2026): Arnaud Jeannot
- Area^{1}: 8.07 km^{2} (3.12 sq mi)
- Highest elevation: 773 m (2,536 ft)
- Lowest elevation: 385 m (1,263 ft)
- Population (2023): 2,129
  - Density: 264/km^{2} (683/sq mi)
- Time zone: UTC+01:00 (CET)
  - Summer (DST): UTC+02:00 (CEST)
- INSEE/Postal code: 88409 /88120
- ^{1} French Land Register data, which excludes lakes, ponds, glaciers > 1 km^{2} (0.386 sq mi or 247 acres) and river estuaries.

Saint-Amé (French pronunciation: [sɛ̃.t‿ame]) is a commune in the Vosges department in Grand Est in northeastern France.

== Population ==
Historical population
| Year | Pop. | ±% p.a. |
|---|---|---|
| 1968 | 1,924 | — |
| 1975 | 2,101 | +1.27% |
| 1982 | 2,007 | −0.65% |
| 1990 | 2,033 | +0.16% |
| 1999 | 2,012 | −0.12% |
| 2007 | 2,111 | +0.60% |
| 2012 | 2,179 | +0.64% |
| 2017 | 2,154 | −0.23% |
| 2023 | 2,129 | −0.19% |
Source: INSEE

== See also ==
- Communes of the Vosges department
- Saint Amé, a Benedictine abbot and hermit who is also called Saint Amatus.
- Saint Aimé, the abbot of the Agaune monastery in Switzerland and bishop of the Sens (or Sion) diocese.
