= Rilly-la-Montagne =

- Commune
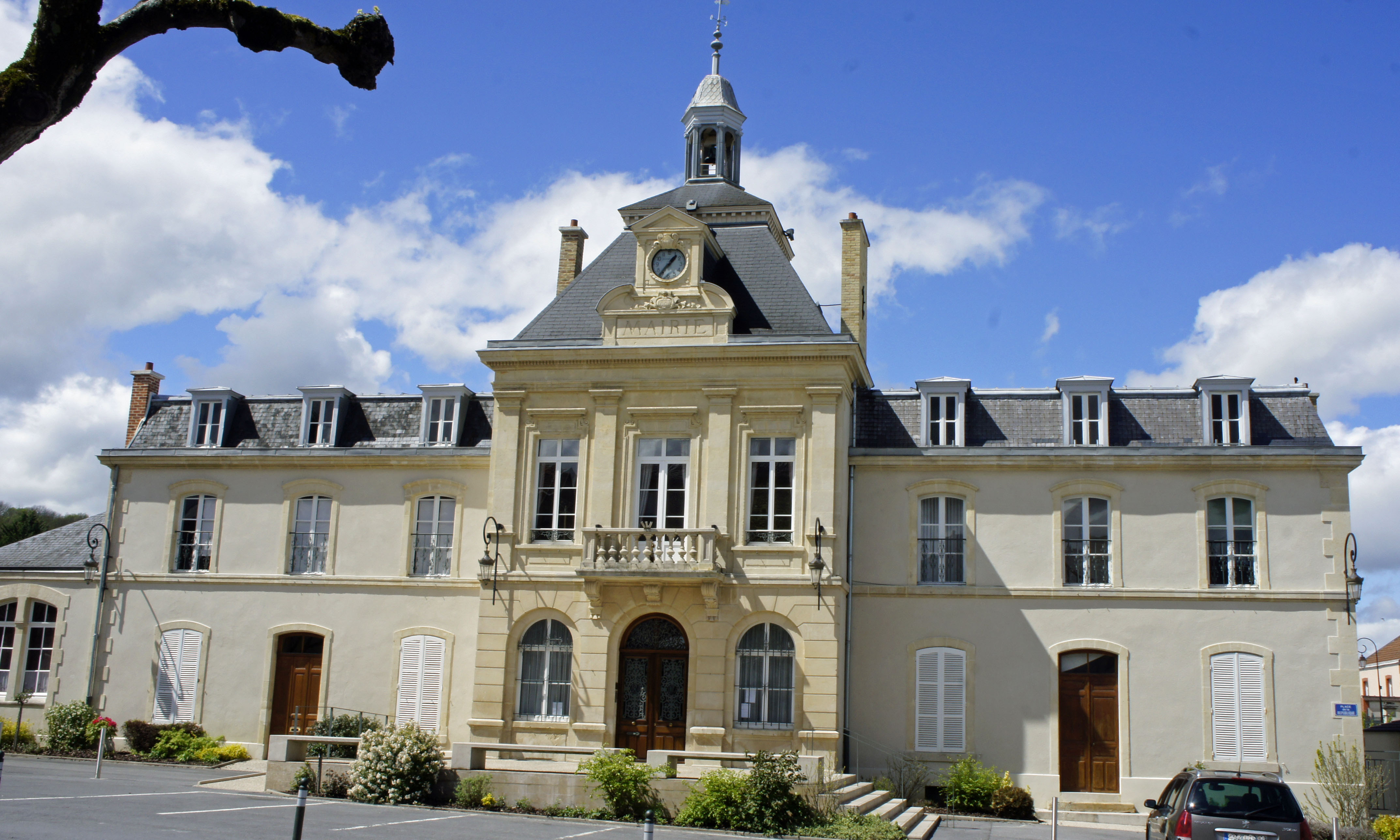
- The town hall in Rilly-la-Montagne
- Location of Rilly-la-Montagne
- Location within France Location within Grand Est
- Coordinates: 49°09′57″N 4°02′47″E
- Country: France
- Region: Grand Est
- Department: Marne
- Arrondissement: Reims
- Canton: Mourmelon-Vesle et Monts de Champagne
- Intercommunality: CU Grand Reims

Government
  - Mayor (2020–2026): Alain Toullec
- Area^{1}: 8.87 km^{2} (3.42 sq mi)
- Elevation: 157 m (515 ft)
- Population (2023): 1,003
  - Density: 113/km^{2} (293/sq mi)
- Time zone: UTC+01:00 (CET)
  - Summer (DST): UTC+02:00 (CEST)
- INSEE/Postal code: 51461 /51500
- ^{1} French Land Register data, which excludes lakes, ponds, glaciers > 1 km^{2} (0.386 sq mi or 247 acres) and river estuaries.

Rilly-la-Montagne (French pronunciation: [ʁiji la mɔ̃taɲ]) is one of the Communes of the Marne department in north-eastern France. The railway tunnel in the area was used as a World War II V-1 flying bomb storage depot. Rilly-la-Montagne station has rail connections to Reims and Épernay.

== See also ==
- Montagne de Reims Regional Natural Park
