= Arboretum de Xertigny =

Municipal arboretum and park in Grand Est, France

Coordinates: 48.0438°N 6.4039°E

The Arboretum de Xertigny (4 hectares), also known as the Arboretum du Château des Brasseurs, is a municipal arboretum and park located at Mairie 1, le Château, Xertigny, Vosges, Grand Est, France. It is open daily without charge.

The arboretum was established in 1994 to protect the former park of the Château des Brasseurs (Brewers' Castle), originally created in 1888 by local brewery owner Victor Champion, who planted a number of trees from North America and Asia when laying out the park. Although Xertigny's brewery closed in 1966 and the château now houses the town government, the arboretum preserves many of the park's old trees, including fine specimens of Araucaria, Cladastris lutea, Douglas fir, Fraxinus ornus, and Sequoiadendron (45 meters).

The adjacent Bois Beaudoin offers further woodland paths. A village legend recounts that Champion discovered the treasure of the Knights Templar in these woods, which provided the fortune for creating château and park; the location of its discovery is duly marked.

== See also ==
- List of botanical gardens in France
