= Saint-Nabord =

- Commune
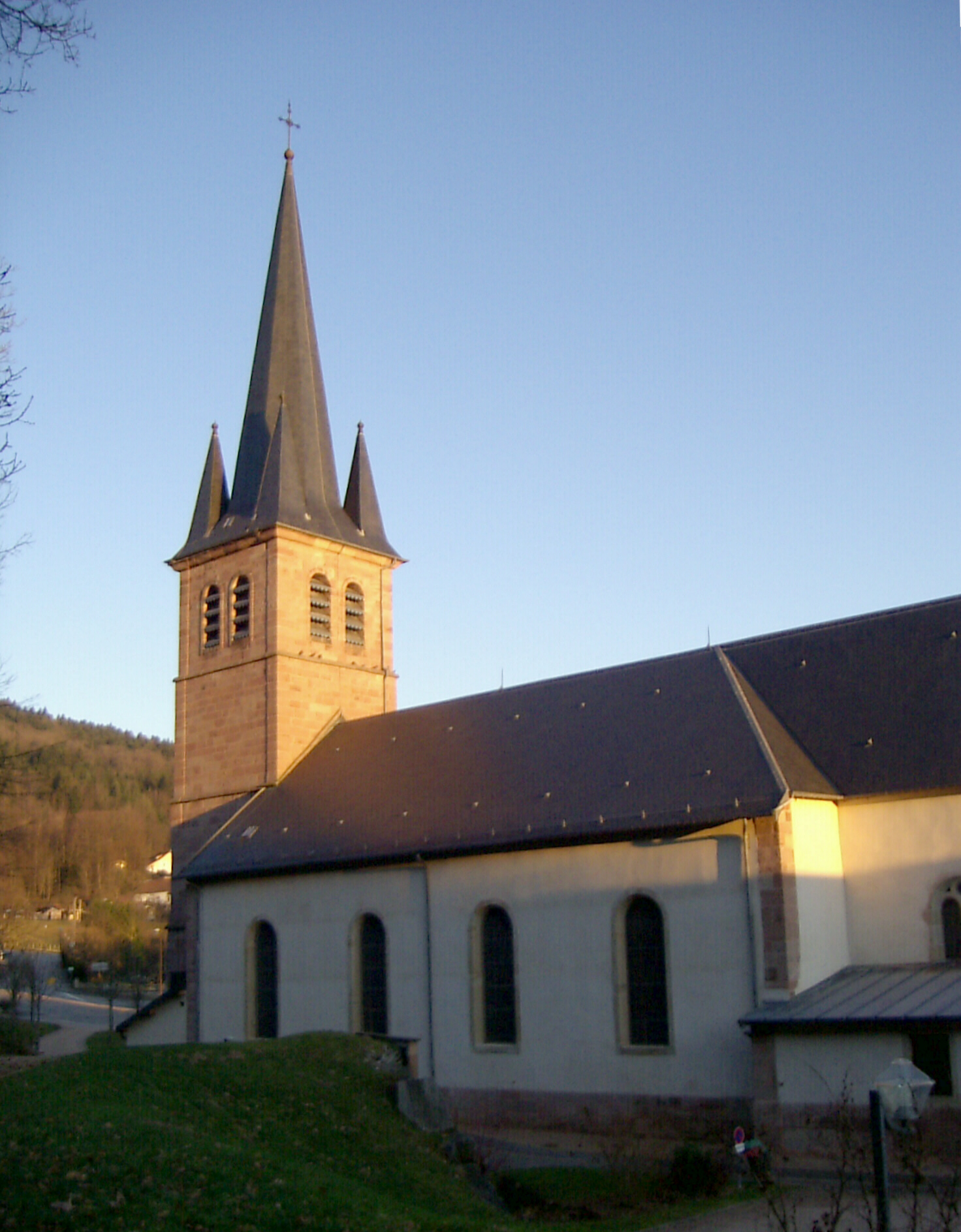
- Saints Nabord and Gorgonius Church

- Coat of arms
- Location of Saint-Nabord
- Location within France Location within Grand Est
- Coordinates: 48°03′01″N 6°34′50″E
- Country: France
- Region: Grand Est
- Department: Vosges
- Arrondissement: Épinal
- Canton: Remiremont
- Intercommunality: CC Porte des Vosges Méridionales

Government
  - Mayor (2020–2026): Jean Pierre Calmels
- Area^{1}: 38.5 km^{2} (14.9 sq mi)
- Elevation: 411 m (1,348 ft)
- Highest elevation: 632 m (2,073 ft)
- Lowest elevation: 367 m (1,204 ft)
- Population (2023): 3,953
  - Density: 103/km^{2} (266/sq mi)
- Time zone: UTC+01:00 (CET)
  - Summer (DST): UTC+02:00 (CEST)
- INSEE/Postal code: 88429 /88200
- Website: www.ville-saint-nabord.fr
- ^{1} French Land Register data, which excludes lakes, ponds, glaciers > 1 km^{2} (0.386 sq mi or 247 acres) and river estuaries.

Saint-Nabord (French pronunciation: [sɛ̃ nabɔʁ]) is a commune in the Vosges department in Grand Est in northeastern France. Saint-Nabord station has rail connections to Épinal, Remiremont and Nancy.

== Population ==
Historical population
Year	Pop.	±% p.a.
1968	2,660	—
1975	3,205	+2.70%
1982	3,768	+2.34%
1990	3,805	+0.12%
1999	3,853	+0.14%
2007	3,953	+0.32%
2012	4,096	+0.71%
2017	4,052	−0.22%
2023	3,953	−0.41%
Source: INSEE

== See also ==
- Communes of the Vosges department
