= Canton of Remiremont =

Coordinates: 48°03′33″N 6°38′11″E

Remiremont
- Canton
- Country: France
- Region: Grand Est
- Department: Vosges
- No. of communes: {{{nbcomm}}}
- Area: 165.44 km^{2} (63.88 sq mi)
- Population (2023): 24,642
  - Density: 148.95/km^{2} (385.77/sq mi)
- INSEE code: 88 12

The Canton of Remiremont is a French administrative and electoral grouping of communes in the Vosges département of eastern France and in the region of Grand Est. Its administrative centre is at Remiremont.

== Composition ==
At the French canton reorganisation which came into effect in March 2015, the canton was reduced from 16 to 9 communes:

- Cleurie
- Éloyes
- Jarménil
- Pouxeux
- Raon-aux-Bois
- Remiremont
- Saint-Amé
- Saint-Étienne-lès-Remiremont
- Saint-Nabord
