= Communauté de communes de la Porte des Vosges Méridionales =

Federation of municipalities in France

Porte des Vosges Méridionales
- Communauté de communes
- Interactive map of Porte des Vosges Méridionales
- Coordinates: 48°01′N 06°36′E
- Country: France
- Region: Grand Est
- Department: Vosges
- No. of communes: {{{nbcomm}}}
- Established: 2017
- Area: 262.8 km^{2} (101.5 sq mi)
- Population (2019): 29,262
  - Density: 111.3/km^{2} (288.4/sq mi)

The Communauté de communes de la Porte des Vosges Méridionales is an administrative association of rural communes in the Vosges department of eastern France. It was created on 1 January 2017 by the merger of the former Communauté de communes de la Porte des Hautes-Vosges, Communauté de communes des Vosges Méridionales and the commune Saint-Amé. It consists of 10 communes, and has its administrative offices at Saint-Étienne-lès-Remiremont. Its area is 262.8 km^{2}, and its population was 29,262 in 2019.

== Composition ==
The communauté de communes consists of the following 10 communes:

1. Dommartin-lès-Remiremont
2. Éloyes
3. Girmont-Val-d'Ajol
4. Le Val-d'Ajol
5. Plombières-les-Bains
6. Remiremont
7. Saint-Amé
8. Saint-Étienne-lès-Remiremont
9. Saint-Nabord
10. Vecoux
