= Girmont-Val-d'Ajol =

Girmont-Val-d’Ajol
- Commune
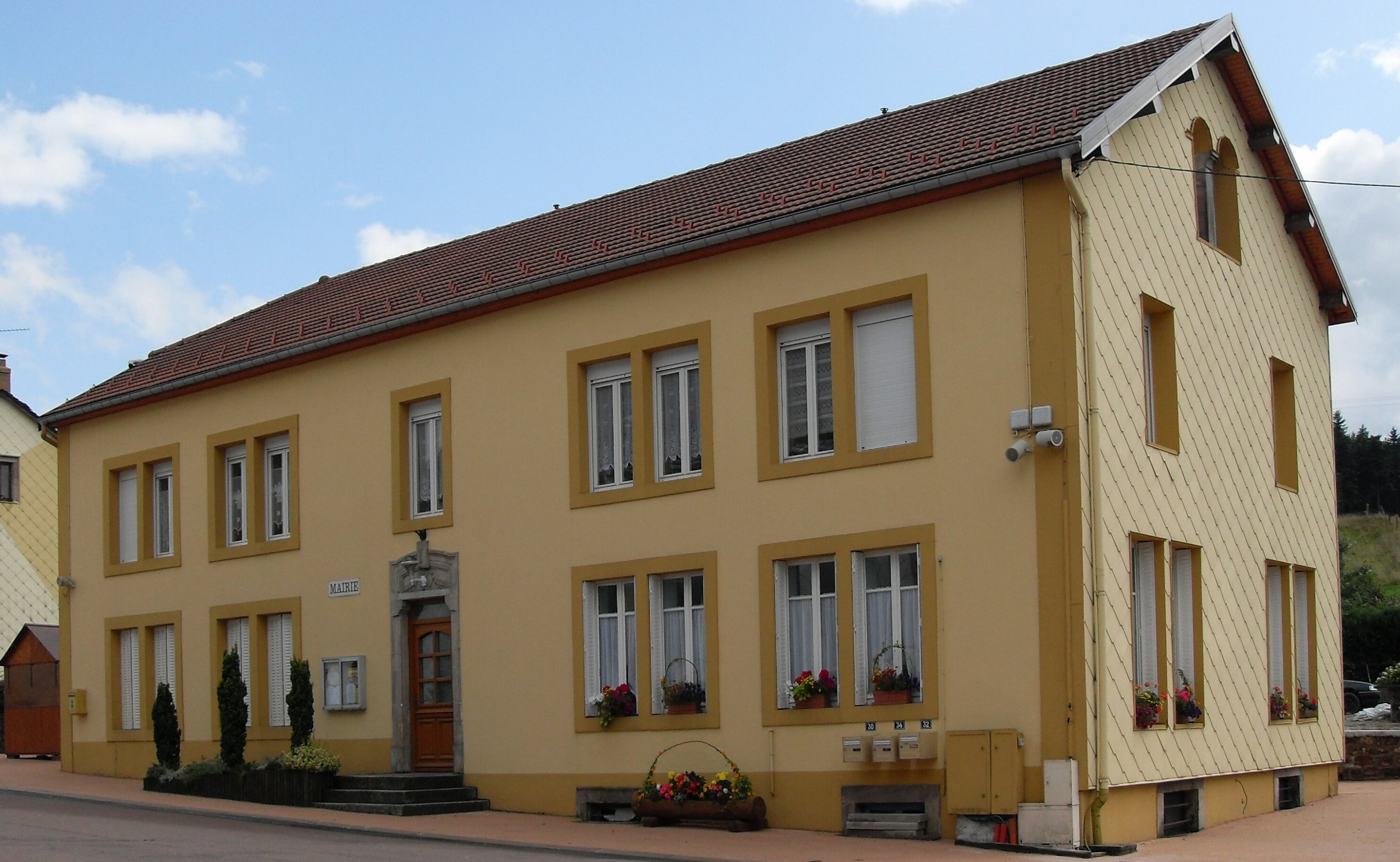
- The town hall in Girmont-Val-d'Ajol
- Location of Girmont-Val-d’Ajol
- Location within France Location within Grand Est
- Coordinates: 47°57′17″N 6°33′43″E
- Country: France
- Region: Grand Est
- Department: Vosges
- Arrondissement: Épinal
- Canton: Le Val-d'Ajol
- Intercommunality: CC Porte des Vosges Méridionales

Government
  - Mayor (2020–2026): Patrick Vincent
- Area^{1}: 16.67 km^{2} (6.44 sq mi)
- Highest elevation: 752 m (2,467 ft)
- Lowest elevation: 430 m (1,410 ft)
- Population (2023): 264
  - Density: 15.8/km^{2} (41.0/sq mi)
- Time zone: UTC+01:00 (CET)
  - Summer (DST): UTC+02:00 (CEST)
- INSEE/Postal code: 88205 /88340
- ^{1} French Land Register data, which excludes lakes, ponds, glaciers > 1 km^{2} (0.386 sq mi or 247 acres) and river estuaries.

Girmont-Val-d'Ajol (French pronunciation: [ʒiʁmɔ̃ val daʒɔl]) is a commune in the Vosges department in Grand Est in northeastern France.

== See also ==
- Communes of the Vosges department
