= Rilly-la-Montagne station =

Railway station in Rilly-la-Montagne, France

Rilly-la-Montagne
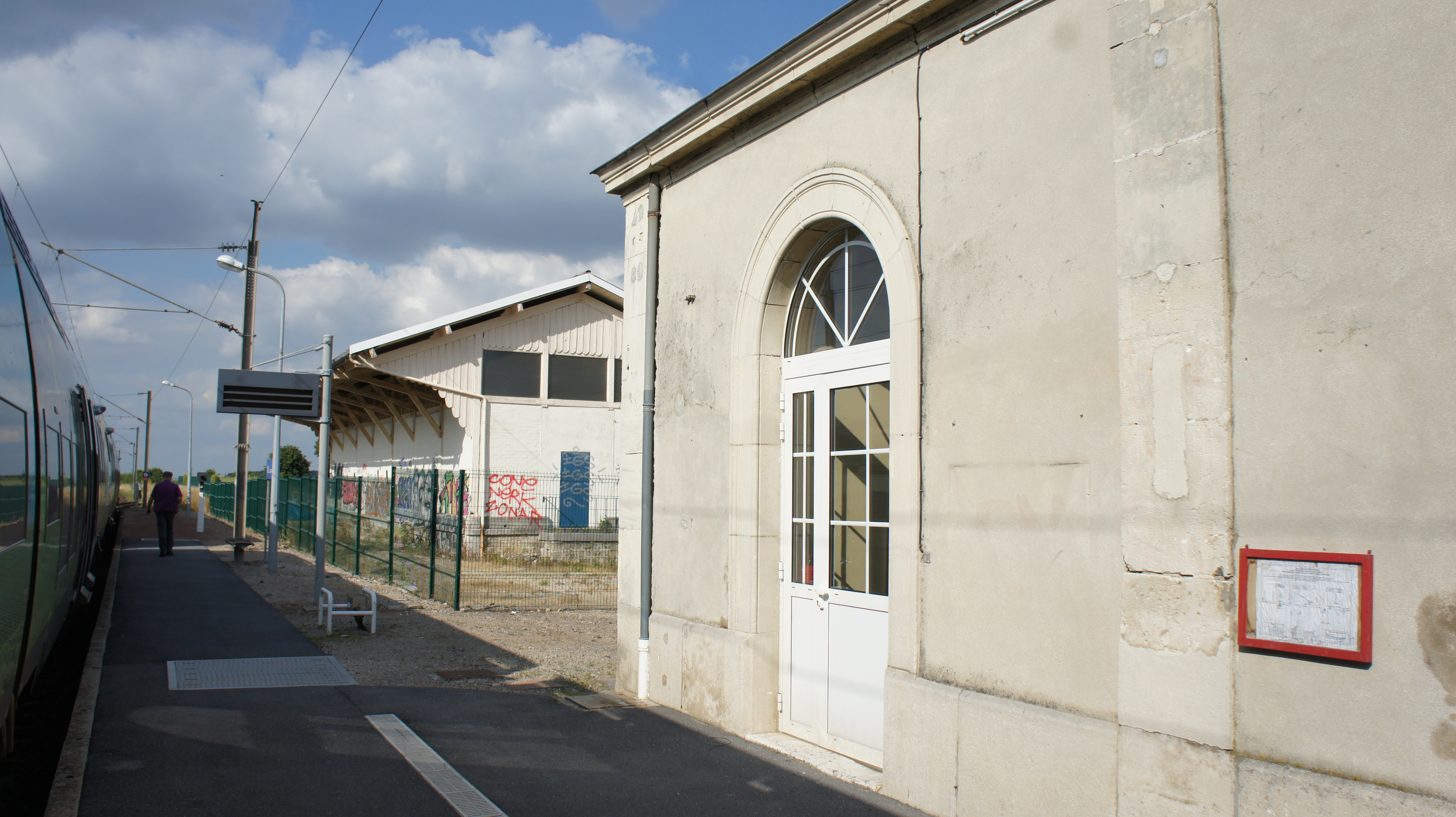

General information
- Location: Place de la Gare; 51500 Rilly-la-Montagne; Marne, France
- Coordinates: 49°09′59″N 4°02′28″E
- Elevation: 158 m (518 ft)
- Owner: SNCF
- Operator: SNCF
- Line: Épernay-Reims railway
- Distance: 160.734 km
- Platforms: 2
- Tracks: 2

Other information
- Station code: 87171595

Passengers
- 2018: 64,498

Services
Preceding station	TER Grand Est	Following station
Germaine towards Épernay	C09	Reims-Maison-Blanche towards Reims
Location

Rilly-la-Montagne station (French: Gare de Rilly-la-Montagne) is a railway station in the commune of Rilly-la-Montagne, Marne department, northern France. It is situated at kilometric point (KP) 160.734 on the Épernay-Reims railway and served by TER Grand Est trains operated by the SNCF.

In 2018, the SNCF estimated that the station served 64,498 passengers.
