= Saint-Dié-des-Vosges station =

Railway station in Saint-Dié-des-Vosges, France

Coordinates: 48°16′55″N 6°56′54″E

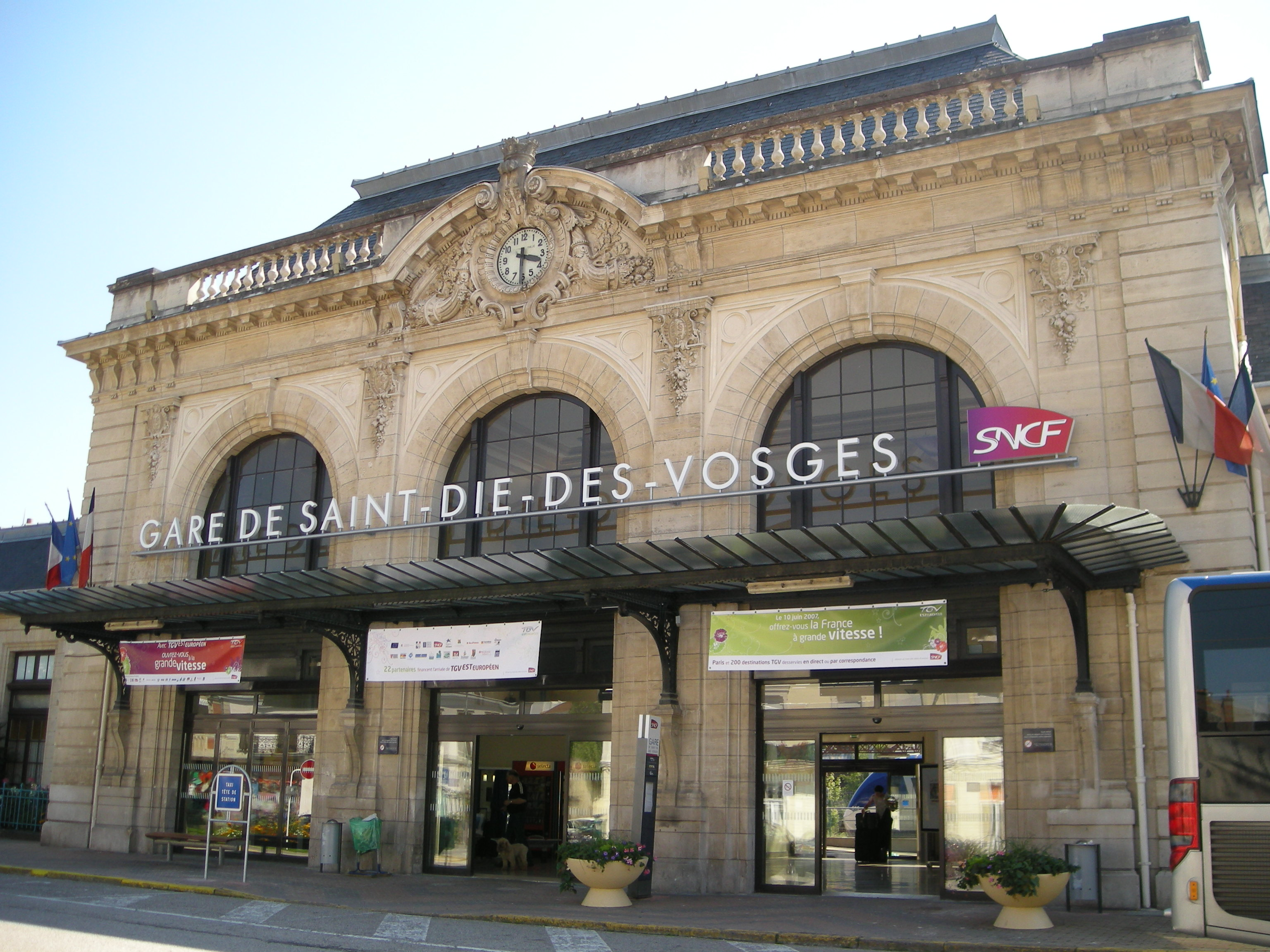

Saint-Dié-des-Vosges station is a railway station serving the town Saint-Dié-des-Vosges, Vosges department, northeastern France. It is situated at the junction of three railway lines: towards Strasbourg, Arches and Lunéville. The station is served by TGV inOui towards Nancy and Paris, and by regional trains towards Strasbourg, Épinal and Nancy.

Preceding station	SNCF	Following station
Lunéville towards Paris-Est	TGV inOui	Terminus
Preceding station	TER Grand Est	Following station
Provenchères-sur-Fave towards Strasbourg	A08	Bruyères towards Épinal
Saint-Michel-sur-Meurthe towards Nancy	L11	Terminus
