= Laveline-devant-Bruyères =

- Commune
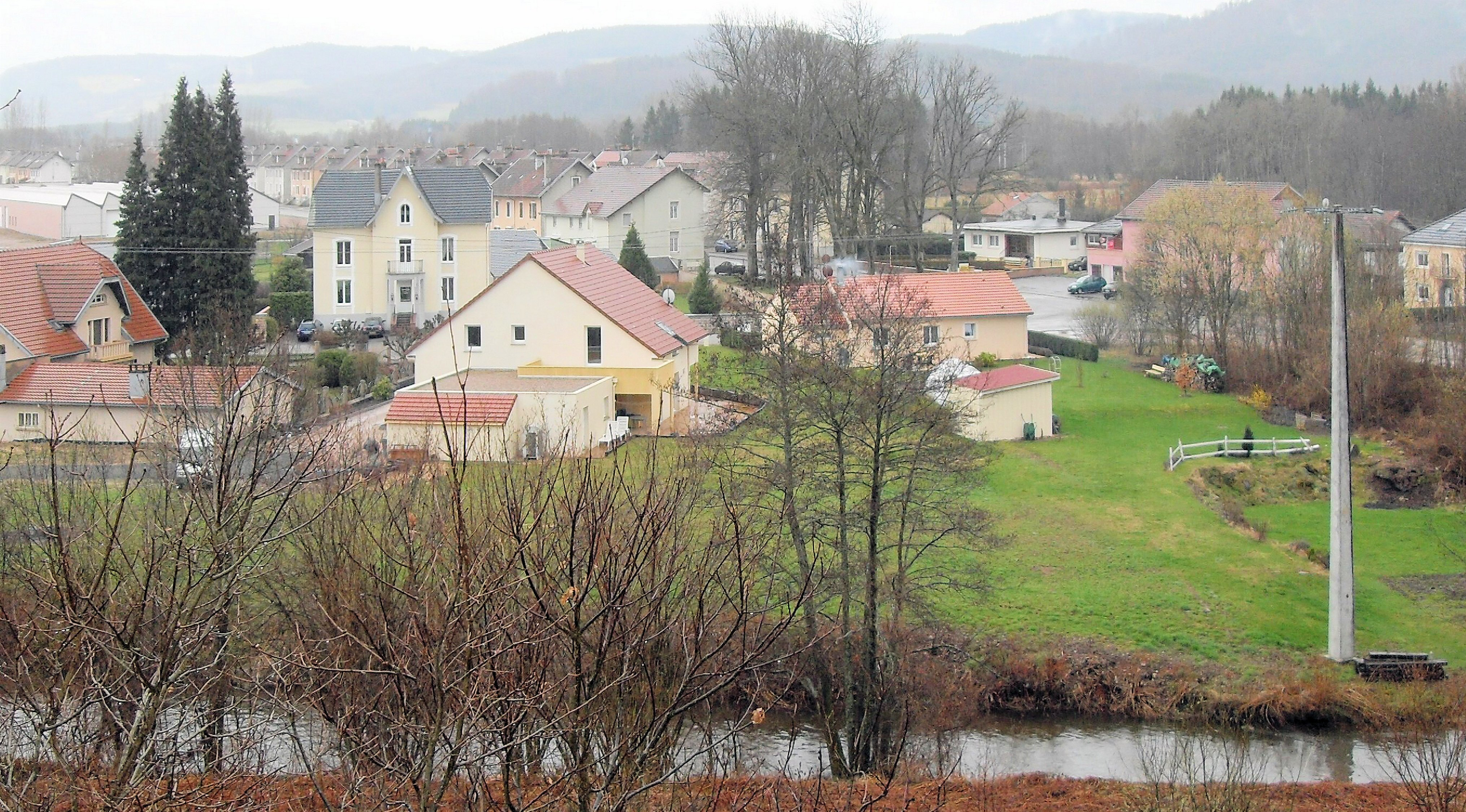
- A general view of Laveline-devant-Bruyères

- Coat of arms
- Location of Laveline-devant-Bruyères
- Location within France Location within Grand Est
- Coordinates: 48°11′05″N 6°45′37″E
- Country: France
- Region: Grand Est
- Department: Vosges
- Arrondissement: Saint-Dié-des-Vosges
- Canton: Bruyères
- Intercommunality: CC Bruyères - Vallons des Vosges

Government
  - Mayor (2020–2026): Allégra Fleurence
- Area^{1}: 3.1 km^{2} (1.2 sq mi)
- Highest elevation: 706 m (2,316 ft)
- Lowest elevation: 440 m (1,440 ft)
- Population (2023): 581
  - Density: 190/km^{2} (490/sq mi)
- Time zone: UTC+01:00 (CET)
  - Summer (DST): UTC+02:00 (CEST)
- INSEE/Postal code: 88262 /88600
- ^{1} French Land Register data, which excludes lakes, ponds, glaciers > 1 km^{2} (0.386 sq mi or 247 acres) and river estuaries.

Laveline-devant-Bruyères (French pronunciation: [lavlin dəvɑ̃ bʁɥijɛʁ]; literally "Laveline before Bruyères") is a commune in the Vosges department in Grand Est in northeastern France.

== See also ==
- Communes of the Vosges department
