= Éloyes =

- Commune
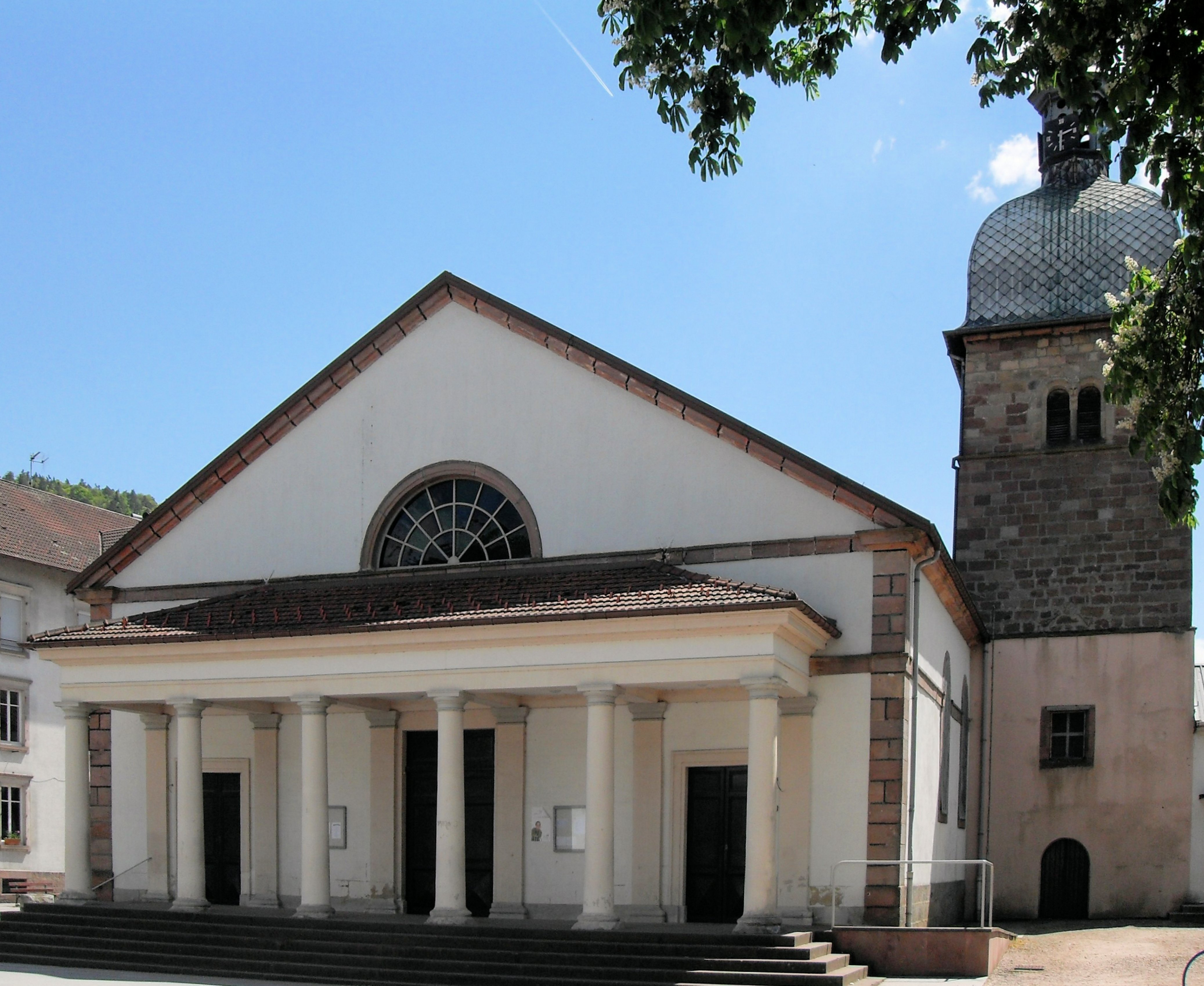
- Church of the Assumption of the Virgin

- Coat of arms
- Location of Éloyes
- Location within France Location within Grand Est
- Coordinates: 48°05′48″N 6°36′37″E
- Country: France
- Region: Grand Est
- Department: Vosges
- Arrondissement: Épinal
- Canton: Remiremont
- Intercommunality: CC Porte des Vosges Méridionales

Government
  - Mayor (2020–2026): André Jacquemin
- Area^{1}: 12.51 km^{2} (4.83 sq mi)
- Elevation: 387 m (1,270 ft)
- Highest elevation: 781 m (2,562 ft)
- Lowest elevation: 361 m (1,184 ft)
- Population (2023): 3,138
  - Density: 250.8/km^{2} (649.7/sq mi)
- Time zone: UTC+01:00 (CET)
  - Summer (DST): UTC+02:00 (CEST)
- INSEE/Postal code: 88158 /88510
- ^{1} French Land Register data, which excludes lakes, ponds, glaciers > 1 km^{2} (0.386 sq mi or 247 acres) and river estuaries.

Éloyes (French pronunciation: [elwa]) is a commune in the Vosges department in Grand Est in northeastern France. Éloyes station has rail connections to Épinal, Remiremont and Nancy.

== Population ==
Historical population
Year	Pop.	±% p.a.
1968	3,009	—
1975	3,277	+1.23%
1982	3,329	+0.23%
1990	3,152	−0.68%
1999	3,256	+0.36%
2007	3,286	+0.11%
2012	3,281	−0.03%
2017	3,180	−0.62%
2023	3,138	−0.22%
Source: INSEE

== See also ==
- Communes of the Vosges department
