= Franchet d'Esperey station =

Railway station in Reims, France

Franchet d'Esperey
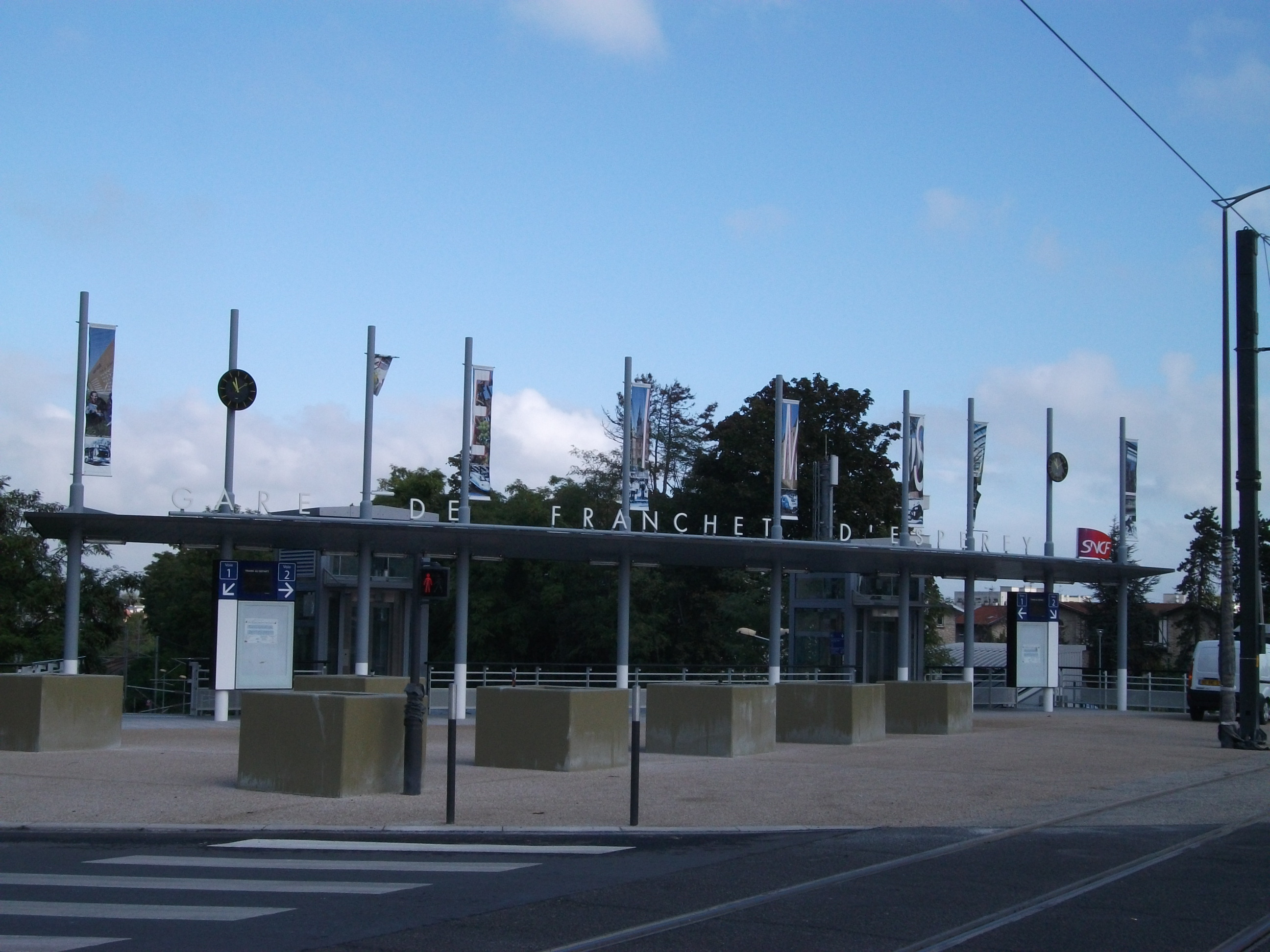

General information
- Location: 51100 Reims; Marne, France
- Coordinates: 49°14′33″N 4°00′50″E
- Elevation: 94 m
- Line(s): Épernay–Reims railway
- Distance: 169.700 km
- Platforms: 2
- Tracks: 2

Other information
- Station code: 87417444

History
- Opened: 31 August 2009

Passengers
- 2018: 53,799

Services
Preceding station	TER Grand Est	Following station
Reims-Maison-Blanche towards Épernay or Champagne-Ardenne TGV	C09	Reims Terminus
Location

Franchet d'Esperey station (French: Gare de Franchet d'Esperey) is a French railway station in the city of Reims, Marne department, northern France. The station is located in the Courlancy and Croix Rouge neighbourhoods of the city. It is situated at kilometric point (KP) 169.700 on the Épernay-Reims railway and served by TER Grand Est trains operated by the SNCF.

== History ==
The station is named after Marshal Louis Franchet d'Espèrey and is in the proximity of a school named after him.

In 2018, the SNCF estimated that 53,799 passengers transited through the station.
