= Arches, Vosges =

Arches
- Commune
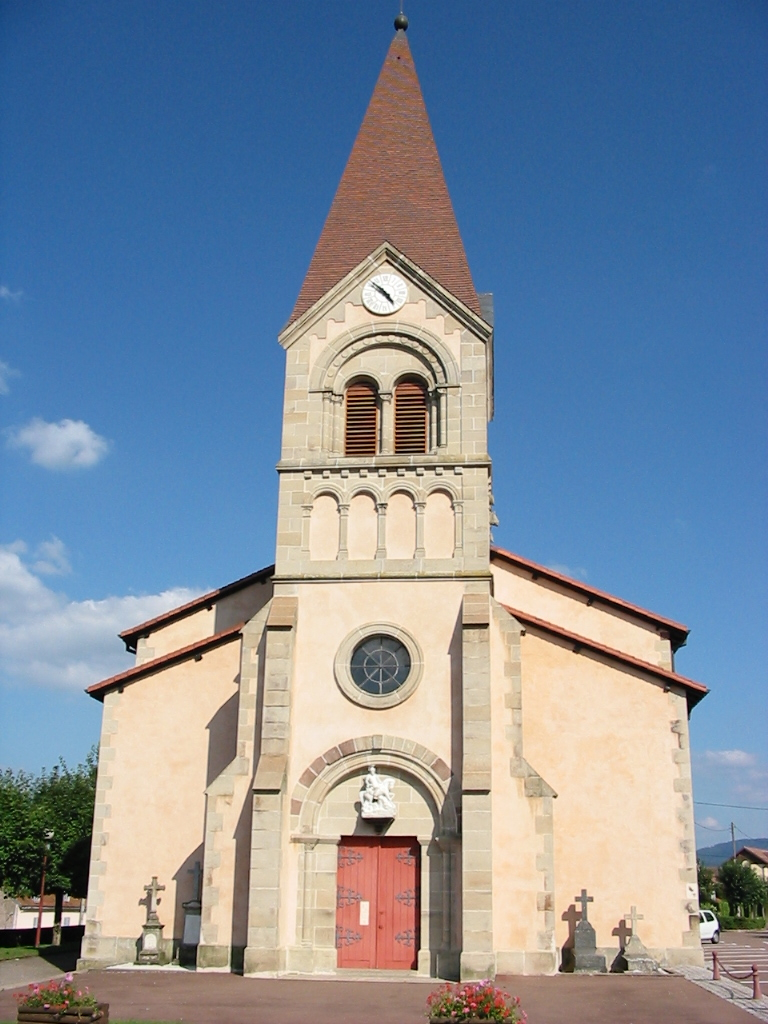
- Church of St. Maurice

- Coat of arms
- Location of Arches
- Location within France Location within Grand Est
- Coordinates: 48°07′09″N 6°31′41″E
- Country: France
- Region: Grand Est
- Department: Vosges
- Arrondissement: Épinal
- Canton: Épinal-1
- Intercommunality: CA Épinal

Government
  - Mayor (2020–2026): David Perrin
- Area^{1}: 17.5 km^{2} (6.8 sq mi)
- Elevation: 357 m (1,171 ft)
- Highest elevation: 521 m (1,709 ft)
- Lowest elevation: 335 m (1,099 ft)
- Population (2023): 1,617
  - Density: 92.4/km^{2} (239/sq mi)
- Time zone: UTC+01:00 (CET)
  - Summer (DST): UTC+02:00 (CEST)
- INSEE/Postal code: 88011 /88380
- ^{1} French Land Register data, which excludes lakes, ponds, glaciers > 1 km^{2} (0.386 sq mi or 247 acres) and river estuaries.

Arches (French pronunciation: [aʁʃ]) is a commune in the Vosges department in Grand Est in northeastern France. Arches station has rail connections to Épinal, Strasbourg and Nancy.

== See also ==
- Arches paper
- Communes of the Vosges department
