= Belfort station =

Railway station in Belfort, France

Belfort
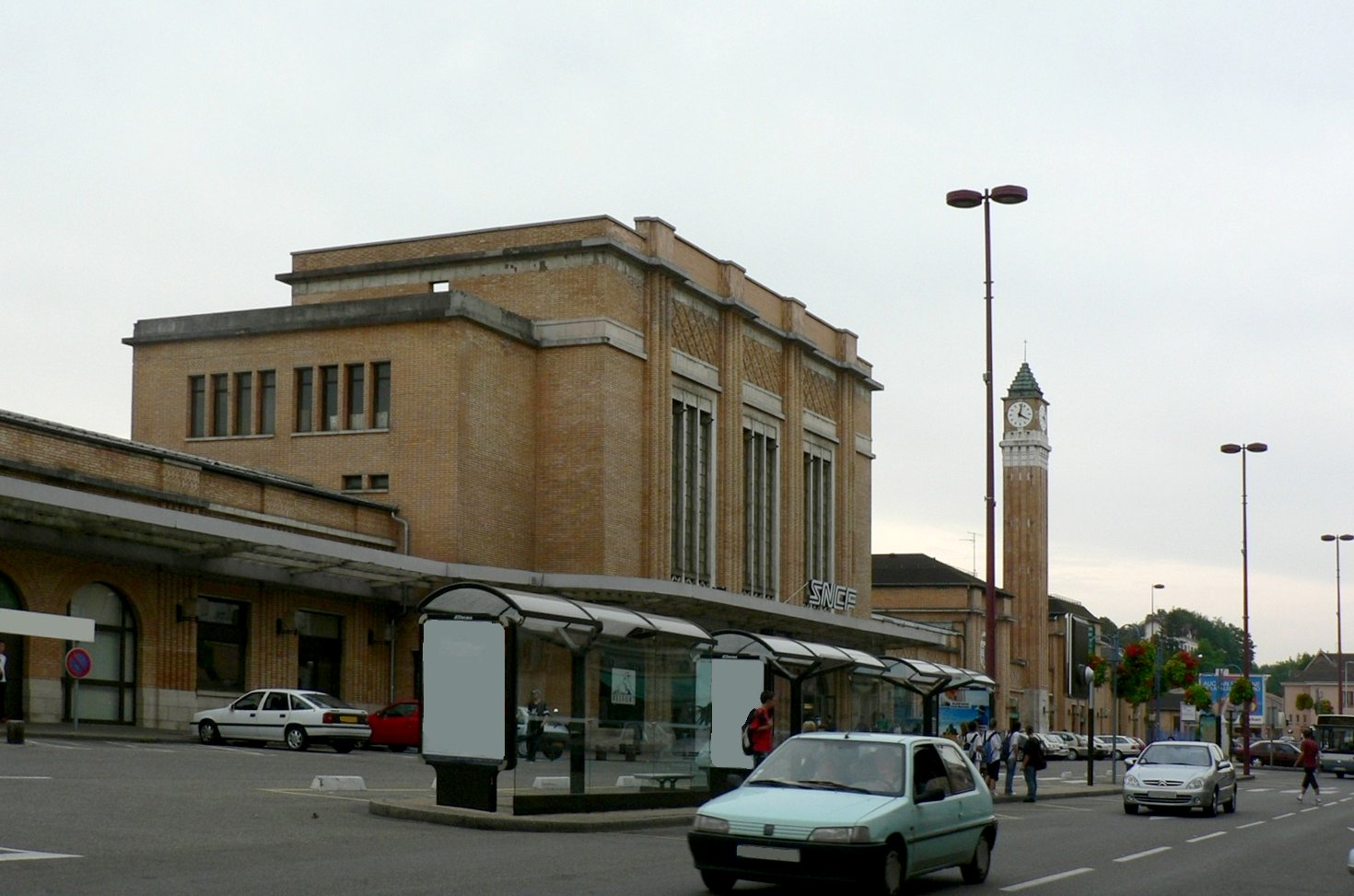
- The station in 2005

General information
- Location: Belfort; France
- Coordinates: 47°38′00″N 6°51′14″E
- Owner: SNCF
- Lines: Belfort–Delle line; Paris–Mulhouse line
- Train operators: SNCF
- Connections: Optymo buses

Other information
- Station code: 87184002

History
- Opened: 15 February 1858

Passengers
- 2024: 1,552,041

Services
Preceding station	TER Grand Est	Following station
Terminus	A16	Chèvremont towards Mulhouse
Lure towards Paris-Est	C04	Altkirch towards Mulhouse-Ville
Lure towards Épinal	L05	Terminus
Preceding station	TER Bourgogne-Franche-Comté	Following station
Héricourt towards Besançon	TER	Terminus
Trois-Chênes towards Vesoul	TER	Terminus
Terminus	TER	Danjoutin towards Delle
Location
- Location within France Location within Bourgogne-Franche-Comté

Belfort station (French: Gare de Belfort) is the railway station serving the town Belfort, Territoire de Belfort department, eastern France. It is situated on the Paris–Mulhouse and Belfort–Delle lines.

== Services ==
Belfort is served by regional trains of TER Grand Est and TER Bourgogne-Franche-Comté. Destinations served include:

- Épinal
- Besançon-Viotte
- Vesoul
- Mulhouse-Ville
- Delle, with connections to Swiss Federal Railways for service to Biel/Bienne.
