= Épinal station =

French railway station

Épinal
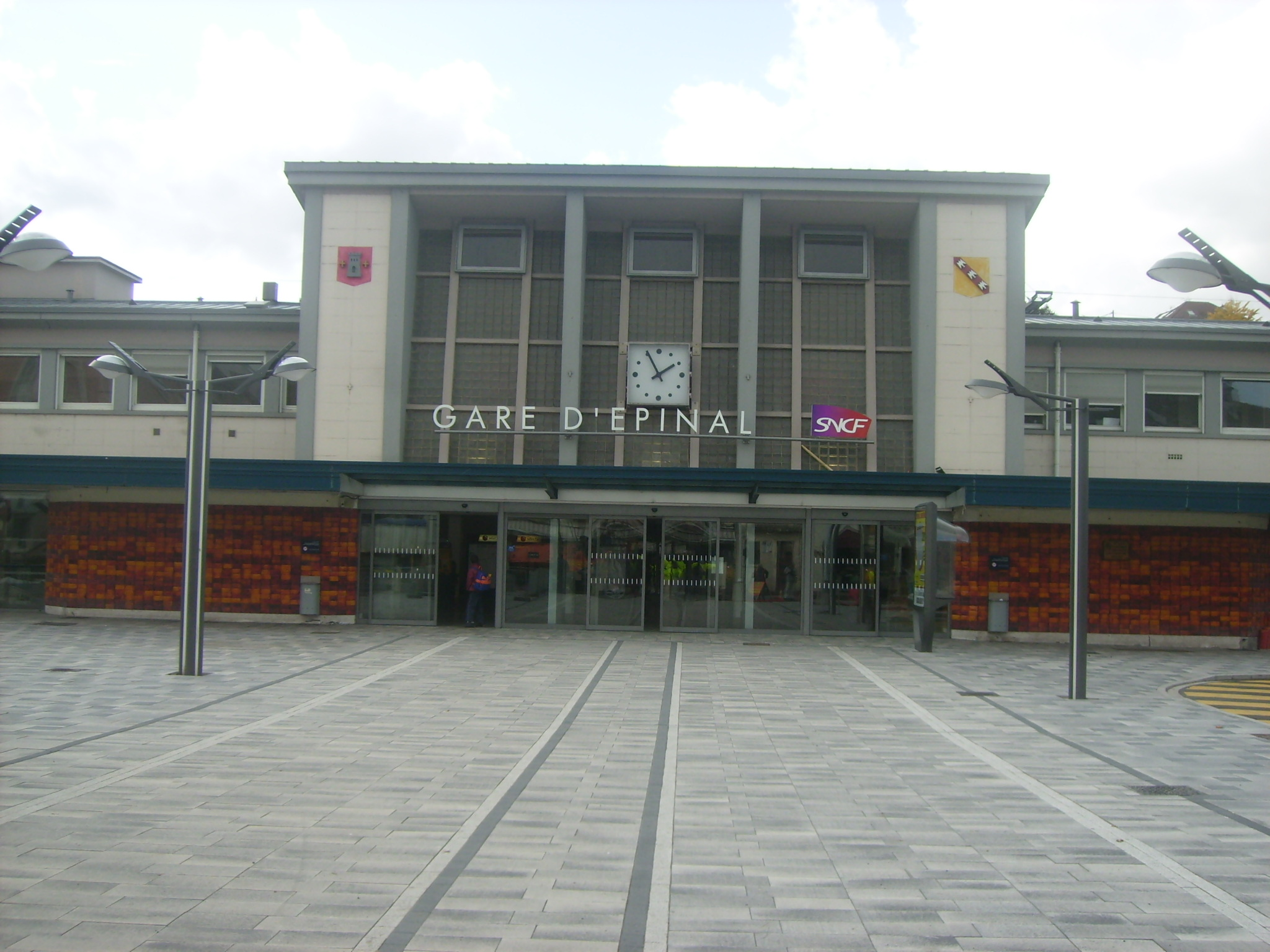

General information
- Location: Place du Général de Gaulle; 88000 Épinal; Vosges, France
- Coordinates: 48°10′40″N 6°26′30″E
- Owner: SNCF
- Operator: SNCF
- Platforms: 2
- Tracks: 3

Other information
- Station code: 87144006

History
- Opened: 24 June 1857

Passengers
- 2024: 1,389,102

Services
| Preceding station | SNCF | Following station |
|---|---|---|
| Nancy-Ville towards Paris-Est | TGV inOui | Remiremont Terminus |
| Preceding station | TER Grand Est | Following station |
| Arches towards Strasbourg | A08 | Terminus |
| Thaon towards Nancy | L04 | Arches towards Remiremont |
| Terminus | L05 | Xertigny towards Belfort |
Location

Épinal station (French: Gare d'Épinal) is a railway station serving the commune of Épinal, Vosges department, France. The station is owned and operated by SNCF, in the TER Grand Est regional rail network and is served by TGV and TER trains. In 2024 the station saw 1,389,102 passengers.

== See also ==
- List of SNCF stations in Grand Est
