= Remiremont station =

French railway station

Coordinates: 48°00′59″N 6°35′56″E

Remiremont
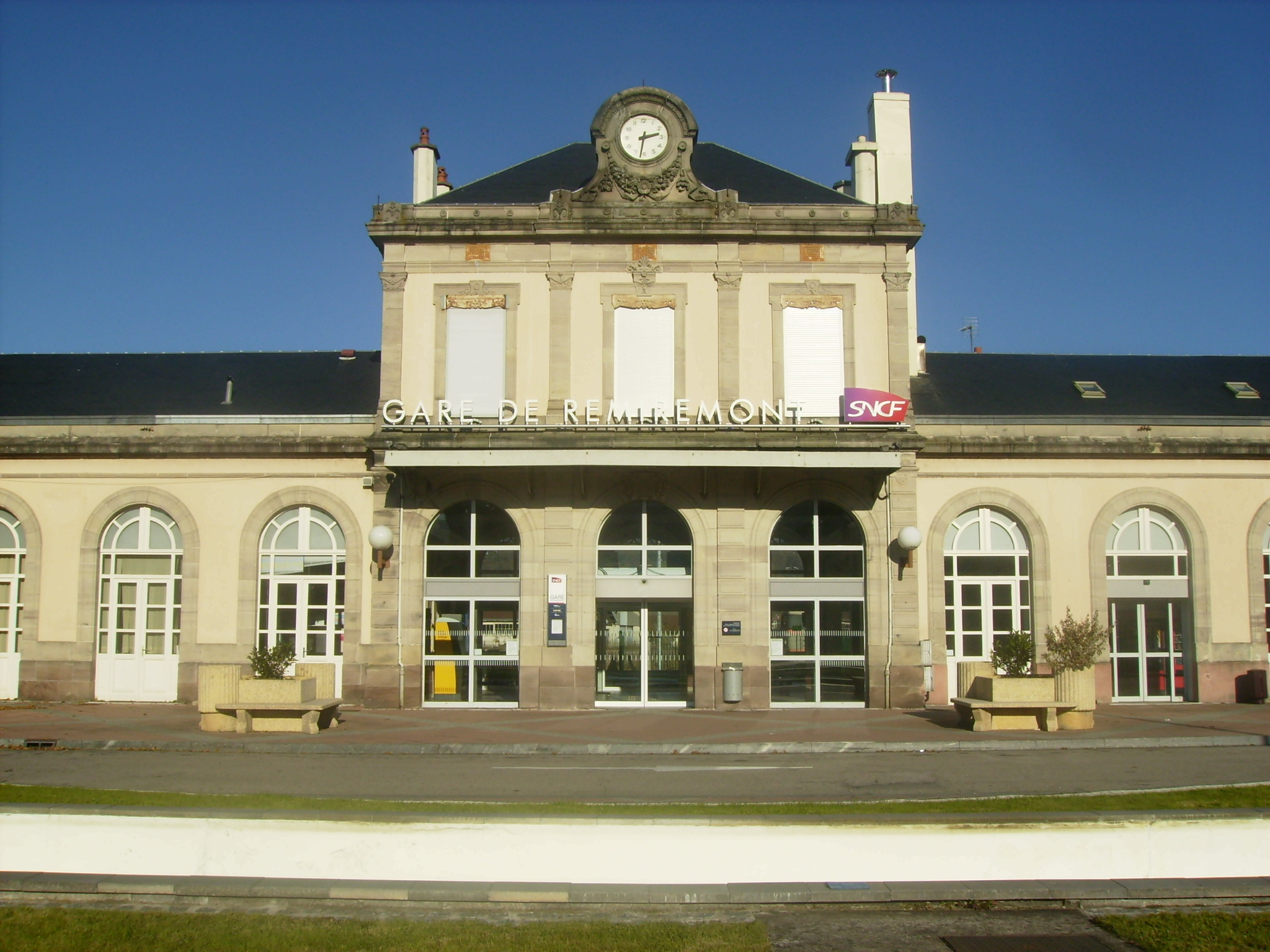

General information
- Location: Place des Martyrs de la Résistance; 88200 Remiremont; Vosges, France
- Owner: SNCF
- Operator: SNCF
- Line: Épinal-Bussang railway
- Platforms: 2
- Tracks: 2

Other information
- Station code: 87144451

History
- Opened: 10 November 1864

Passengers
- 2018: 242,731

Services
Preceding station	SNCF	Following station
Épinal towards Paris-Est	TGV inOui	Terminus
Preceding station	TER Grand Est	Following station
Saint-Nabord towards Nancy	L04	Terminus
Location

Remiremont station (French: Gare de Remiremont) is a railway station serving the commune of Remiremont, Vosges department, France. The station is owned and operated by SNCF, in the TER Grand Est regional rail network and is served by TGV inOui and TER trains.

== See also ==
- List of SNCF stations in Grand Est
