= Nancy-Ville station =

French railway station

Coordinates: 48°41′23″N 6°10′25″E

Nancy
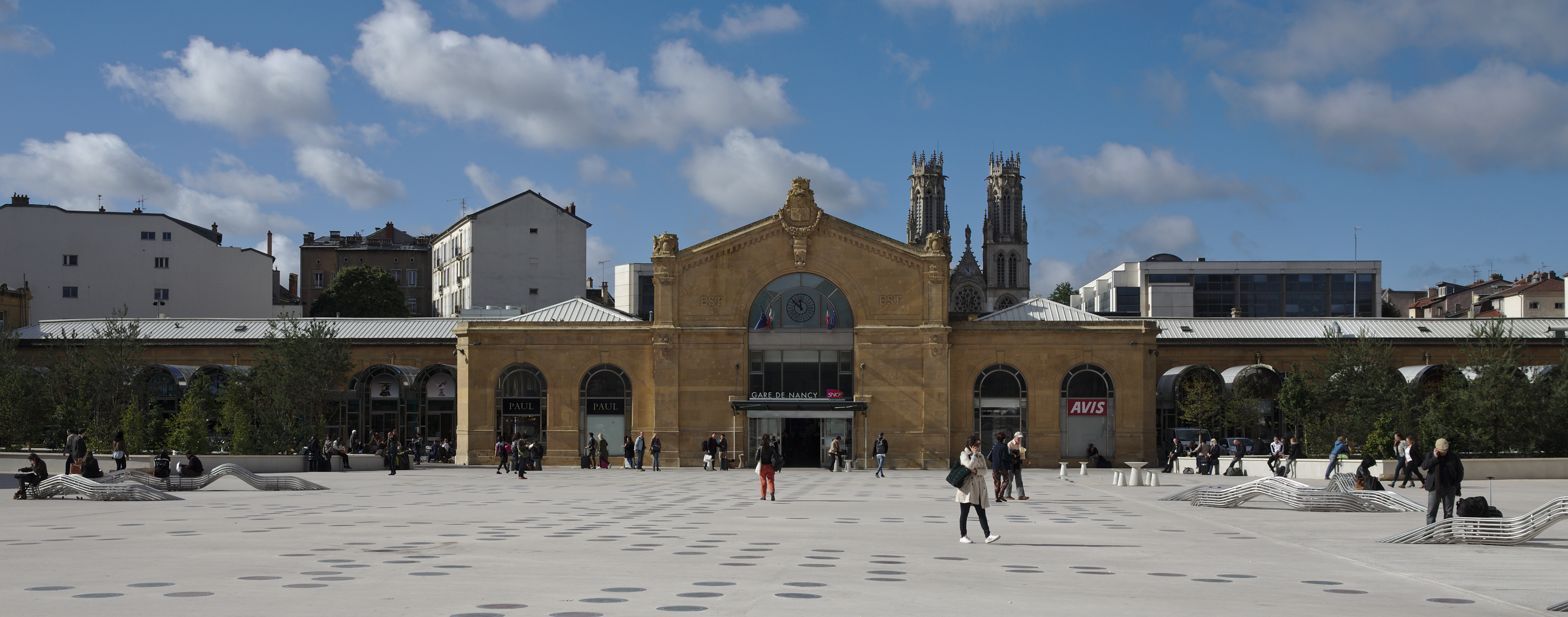

General information
- Location: 3 place Simone-Veil; 54000 Nancy; Meurthe-et-Moselle, France
- Owner: SNCF
- Operator: SNCF
- Platforms: 6
- Tracks: 10

Passengers
- 2024: 9,213,438
Services
Preceding station	SNCF	Following station
Meuse TGV towards Paris-Est	TGV inOui	Terminus
Terminus	TGV inOui	Strasbourg towards Nice-Ville
Paris-Est Terminus	TGV inOui	Épinal towards Remiremont
Preceding station	TER Grand Est	Following station
Terminus	A13	Lunéville towards Strasbourg
Toul towards Paris-Est	C02	Lunéville towards Strasbourg
Terminus	L01a	Champigneulles towards Metz
Terminus	L04	Varangéville-Saint-Nicolas towards Remiremont
Terminus	L06a	Jarville-la-Malgrange towards Pont-Saint-Vincent
Terminus	L07	Liverdun towards Dijon
Terminus	L11	Dombasle-sur-Meurthe towards Saint-Dié-des-Vosges
Terminus	L12	Jarville-la-Malgrange towards Lunéville
Terminus	L25	Pont-à-Mousson towards Longwy
Champigneulles towards Revigny	L29a	Terminus
Location

Nancy-Ville station (French: Gare de Nancy-Ville) is the main railway station serving the city Nancy, Meurthe-et-Moselle department, northeastern France. It is situated on the Paris–Strasbourg railway.

== Services ==
The station is served by high speed trains to Paris and Strasbourg, and by regional trains towards Paris, Épinal, Metz, Strasbourg and Dijon.

A shuttle bus service serves the connection between Lorraine TGV station and the regional airport.
