= TER Champagne-Ardenne =

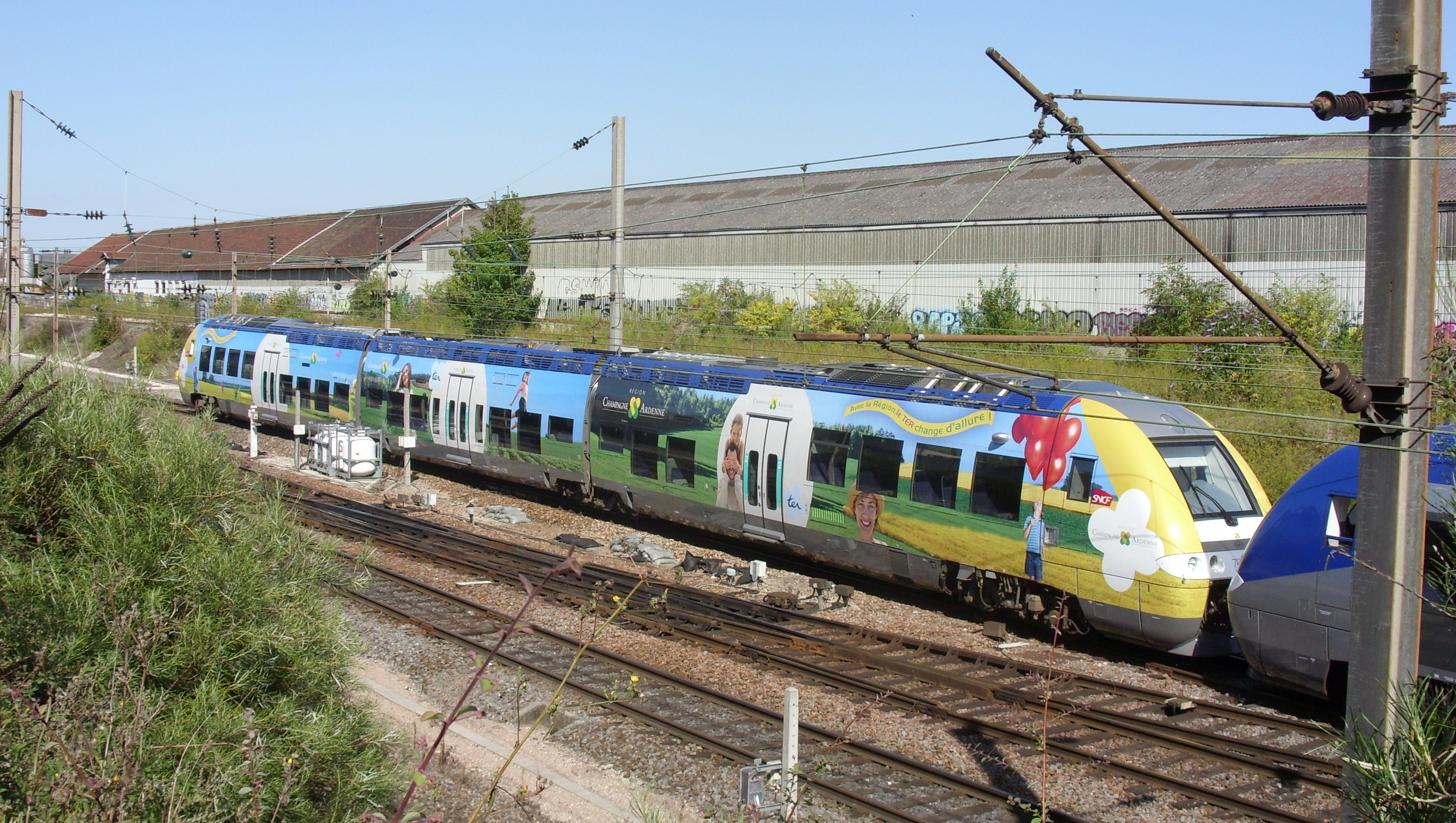
- X 76500 in TER Champagne-Ardenne branding.

Overview
- Line number: 25
- Number of stations: 80
- Website: http://www.sncf.com/en/trains/ter

Operation
- Began operation: 1986
- Ended operation: 11 December 2016

Technical
- Track gauge: 1,435 mm (4 ft 8 1/2 in) standard gauge
Network map
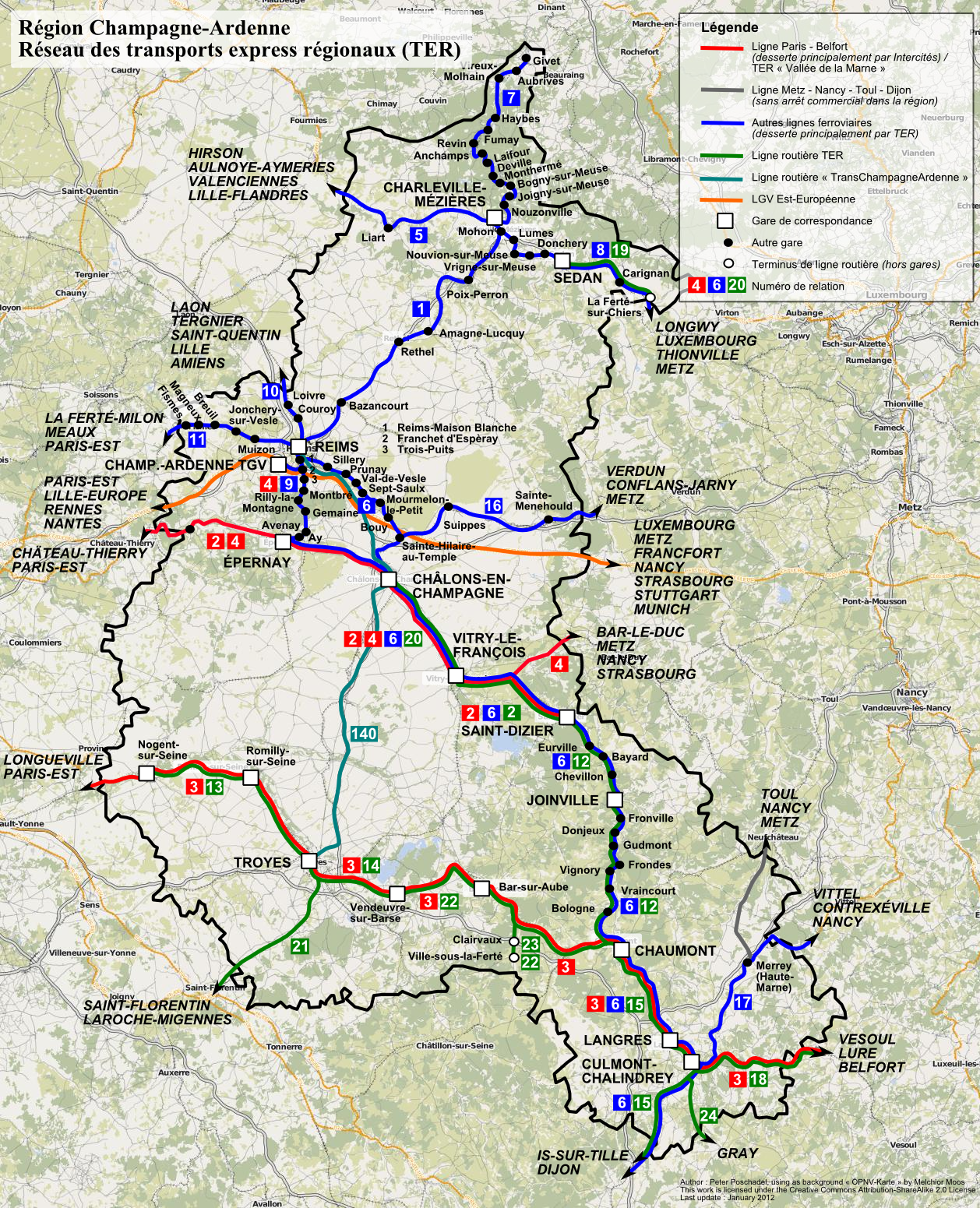

TER Champagne Ardenne was the regional rail network serving the former Champagne-Ardenne région of France. In 2016 it was merged into the new TER Grand Est.

== TER Network ==
=== Rail ===
Line	Route	Frequency	Notes
1	Reims ... Rethel ... Charleville-Mézières		
2	Paris-Est – Château-Thierry – Dormans – Épernay – Châlons-en-Champagne – Vitry-le-François – Saint-Dizier		
3 (17, 18)	Troyes – Vendeuvre – Bar-sur-Aube – Chaumont – Langres – Culmont-Chalindrey		
4	Nancy ... Toul ... Bar-le-Duc ... Châlons-en-Champagne – Épernay – Reims (see TER Lorraine line 29 for details)		
5	Lille-Flandres ... Valenciennes ... Aulnoye-Aymeries† ... Hirson ... Charleville-Mézières (see TER Nord-Pas-de-Calais line 17 for details)		
6	Reims ... Mourmelon-le-Petit ... Châlons-en-Champagne ... Saint-Dizier ... Chaumont ... Culmont-Chalindrey		
8	Givet ... Revin ... Charleville-Mézières		
9	Charleville-Mézières ... Sedan ... Montmédy – Longuyon – Longwy (see TER Lorraine line 26 for details)		
10	Épernay ... Reims		
12	Amiens ... Laon ... Reims (see TER Picardie line 4 for details)		
13	La Ferté-Milon ... Fismes ... Reims (see TER Picardie line 9 for details)		
15	Saint-Dizier ... Joinville ... Chaumont		
19	Châlons-en-Champagne ... Sainte-Menehould ... Verdun		
20	Nancy ... Contrexéville ... Merrey – Culmont-Chalindrey (see TER Lorraine line 6 for details)		
31	Reims – Reims-Franchet d'Esperey† – Reims-Maison-Blanche† – Champagne-Ardenne TGV		
† Not all trains call at this station

=== Bus ===
- Châlons-en-Champagne – Vitry-le-François
- Château-Thierry – Montmirail – Esternay – Sézanne
- Chaumont – Clairvaux
- Culmont–Chalindrey – Gray
- Liart – Laon
- Sedan – Carignan – La Ferté-sur-Chiers
- Troyes – Laroche-Migennes
- Ville-sous-la-Ferté – Bar-sur-Aube – Vendeuvre
- Troyes – Châlons-en-Champagne – Reims – Charleville-Mézières (provided by TransChampagneArdenne and not TER Champagne-Ardenne)

== Rolling stock ==
=== Multiple units ===
- SNCF Class Z 11500
- SNCF Class X 4300
- SNCF Class X 72500
- SNCF Class X 73500
- SNCF Class X 76500 (Also called: XGC 76500)
- SNCF Class B 81500 (Also called: BGC B 81500)

=== Locomotives ===
- BB 16500
- BB 66400

== In Order ==
- SNCF Class Z 27500 (Also called: ZGC Z 27500)

== See also ==
- SNCF
- Transport express régional
- Réseau Ferré de France
- List of SNCF stations in Champagne-Ardenne
- Champagne-Ardenne
