= Vendeuvre (disambiguation) =

Vendeuvre is a commune of the Calvados department, in France.

Vendeuvre may also refer to:

- Château de Vendeuvre, a château in that commune
- Vendeuvre-du-Poitou, Vienne
- Vendeuvre-sur-Barse, Aube

== See also ==
- Vandœuvre (disambiguation)
- Vandœuvres, Switzerland
- Vendœuvres, Indre, France
