= Haguenau station =

Railway station in Haguenau, France

Coordinates: 48°48′49″N 7°46′56″E

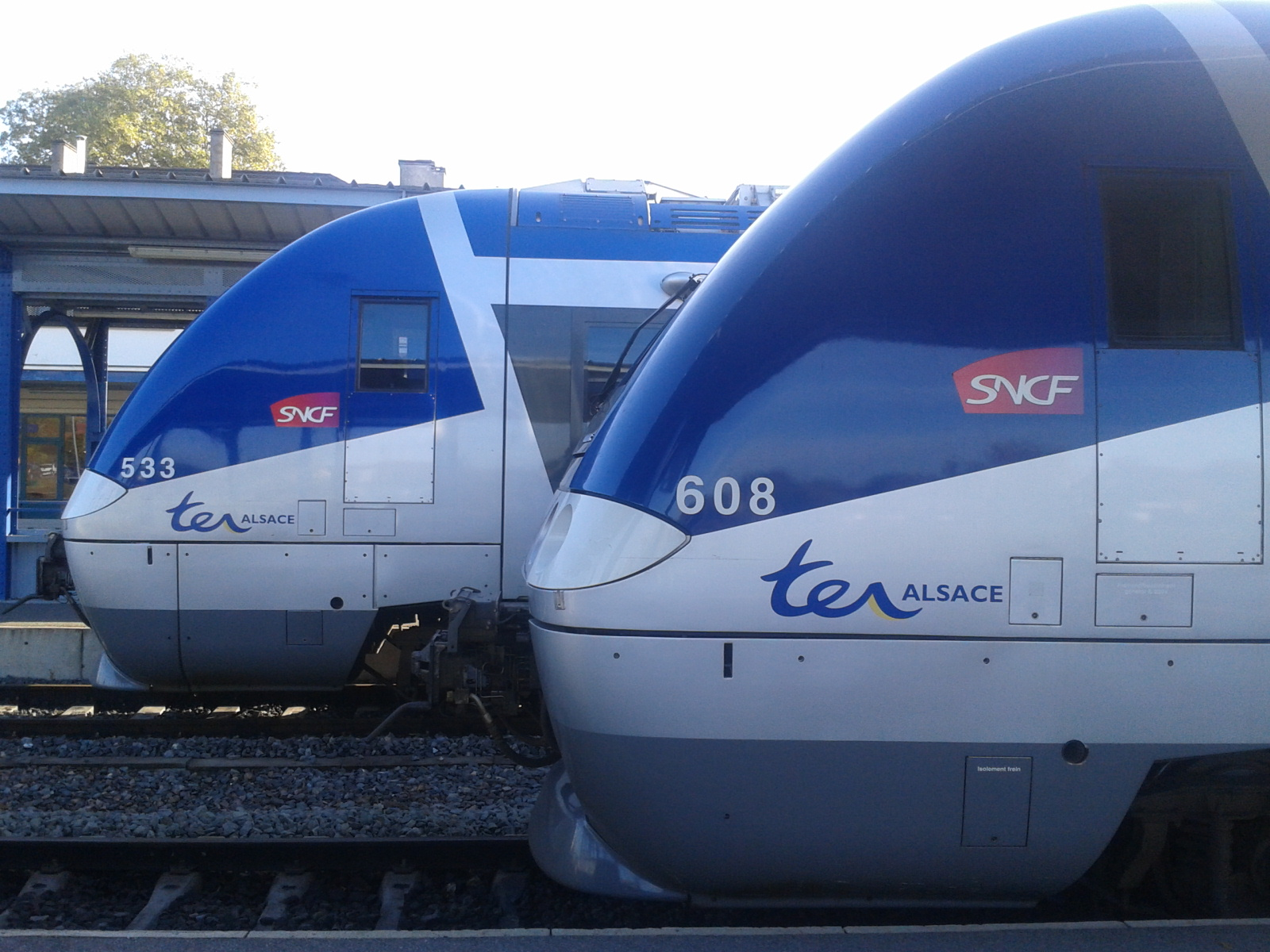
TER Alsace at Haugenau

Haguenau station is a railway station serving the town Haguenau, Bas-Rhin department, northeastern France. It lies at the junction of the railway line from Strasbourg to Wissembourg, and the branch line to Niederbronn-les-Bains. The station is served by regional trains towards Strasbourg, Wissembourg and Niederbronn-les-Bains.

== Gallery ==
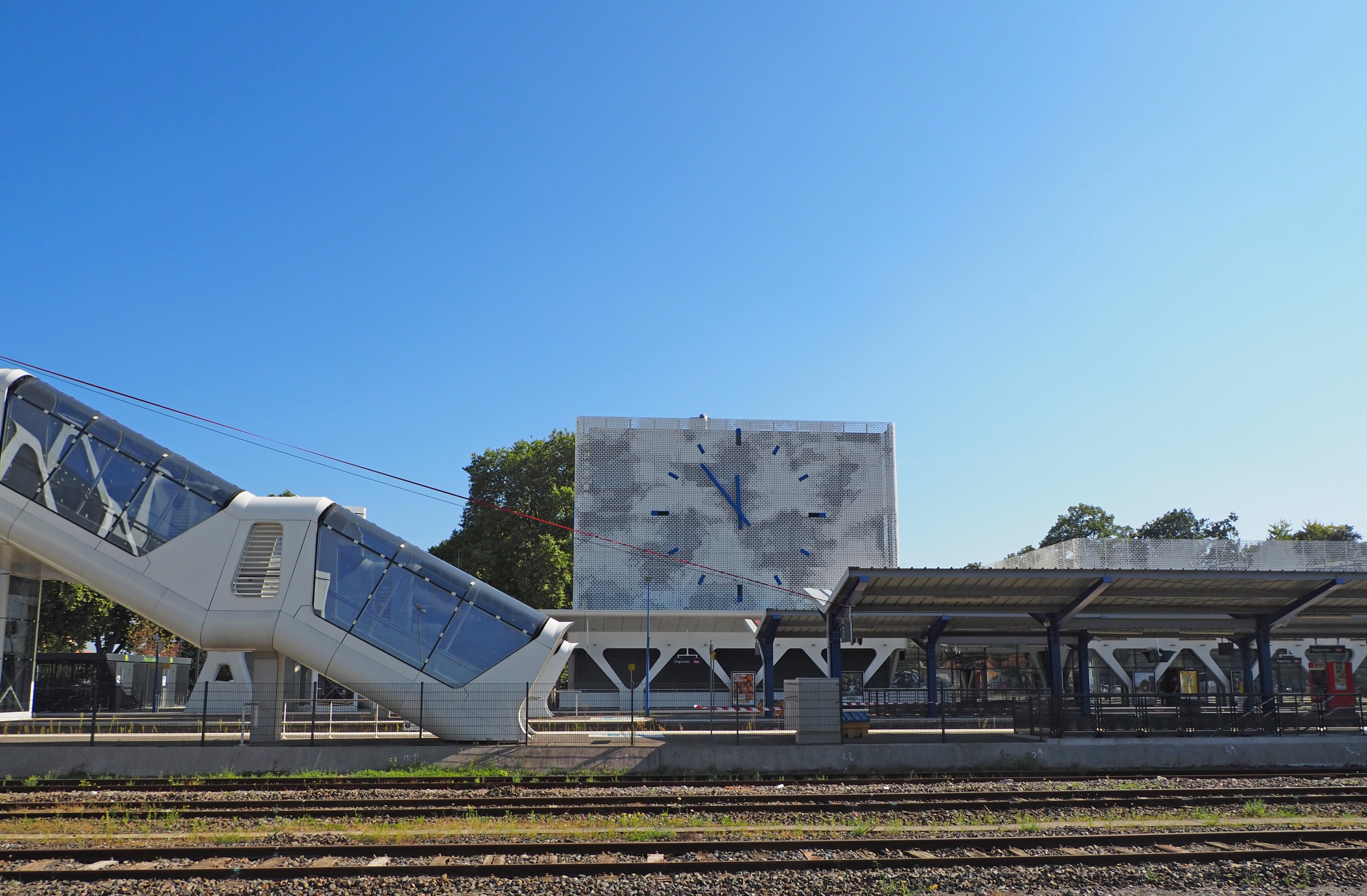
Haguenau station

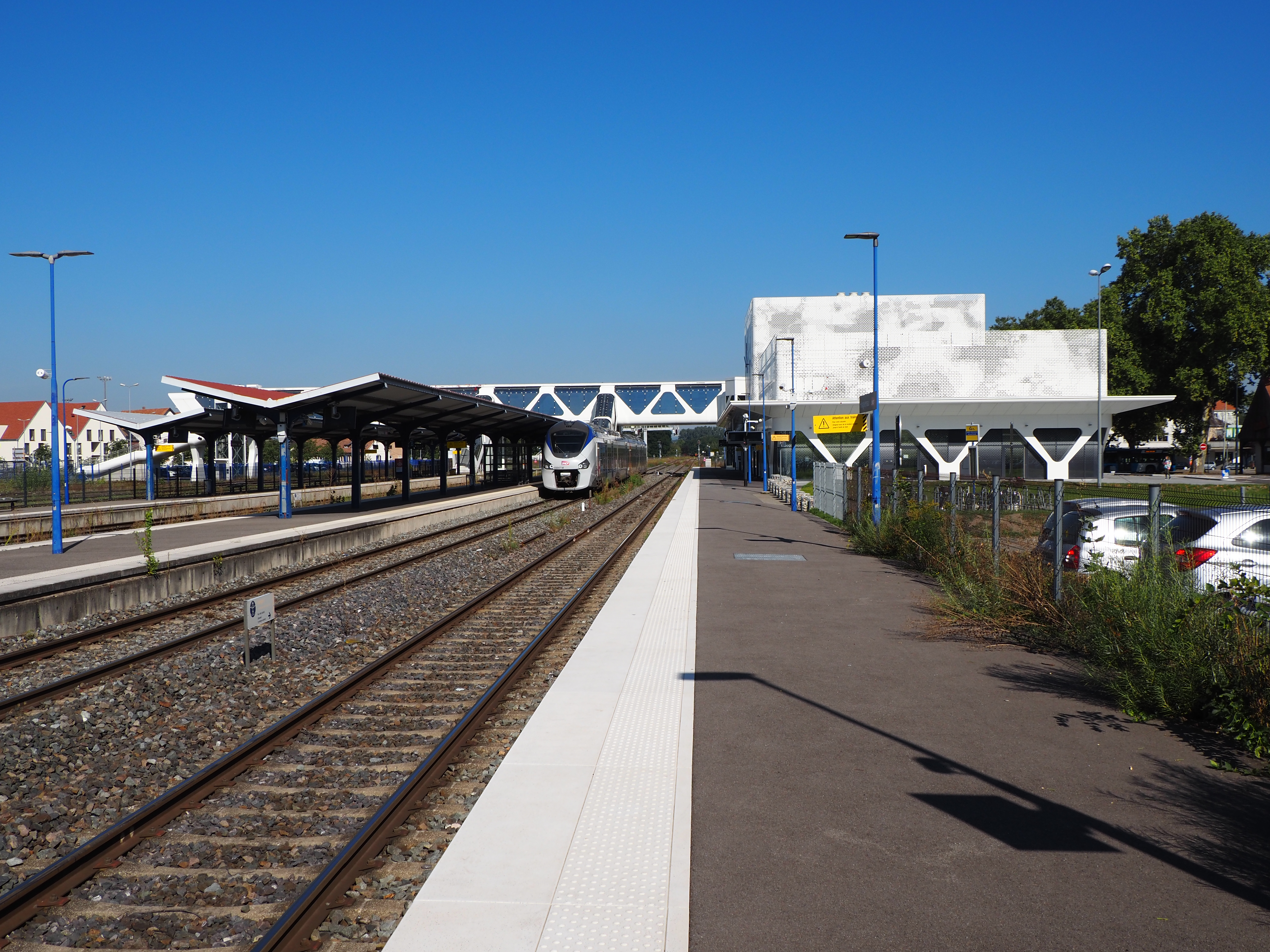
Haguenau plattform area

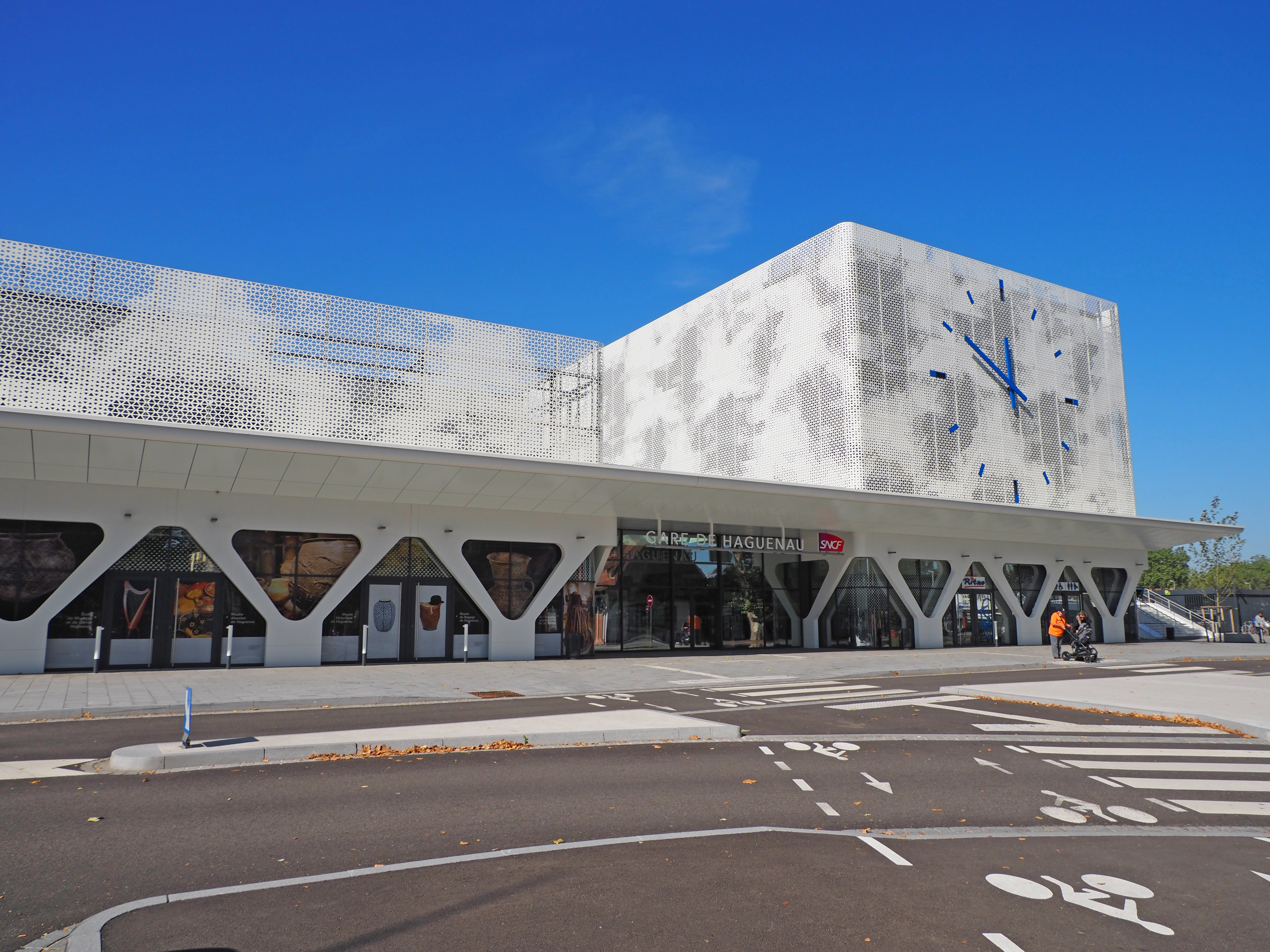
Gare de Haguenau, entrance area

Preceding station	TER Grand Est	Following station
Marienthal towards Strasbourg	A04	Terminus
Bischwiller towards Strasbourg	A05	Schweighouse-sur-Moder towards Niederbronn
Walbourg towards Wissembourg	A34	Bischwiller towards Strasbourg
