= Bitche station =

Railway station in Bitche, France

Bitche
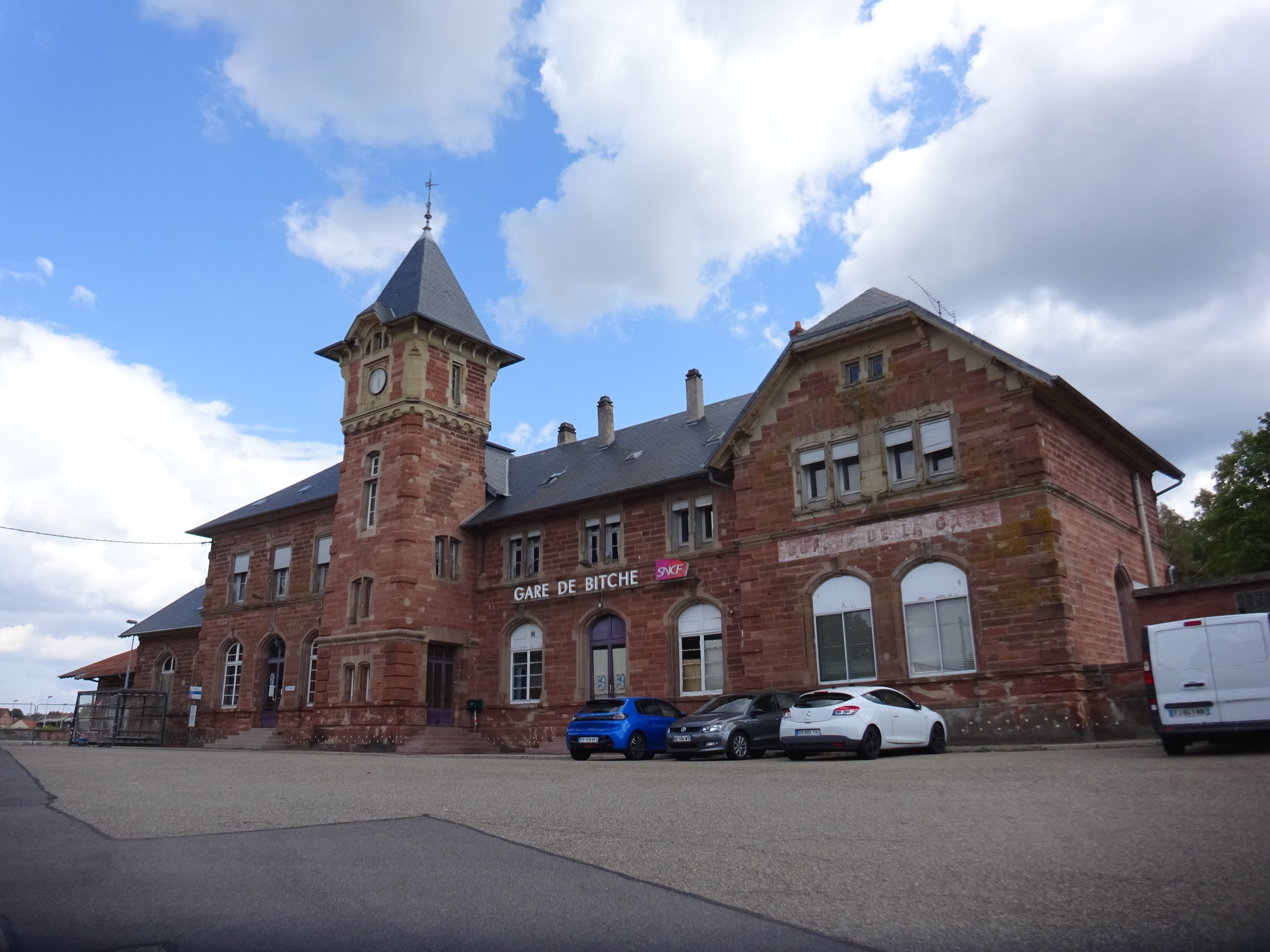
- Bitche station in 2026 (front side)

General information
- Location: Rue de la Gare; 57230 Bitche
- Coordinates: 49.0487685°N 7.4322724°E
- System: former SNCF railway station
- Owner: SNCF
- Line: Haguenau–Hargarten-Falck

Other information
- Station code: 87193821

History
- Opened: 15 December 1869
- Closed: 5 October 2014
- Rebuilt: Winter 1902

Passengers
- 2014: 27,488
Location

The Gare de Bitche ("Bitche station", German: Bahnhof Bitsch), formerly Gare de Bitche-Ville ("Bitche city station"), is a railway station on the Haguenau–Hargarten-Falck line, located in the town of Bitche in the French department of Moselle.

It was opened in 1869 by the Chemins de fer de l'Est and closed in 2014 by the SNCF along with the Sarreguemines–Bitche section of the railway line.

== Location ==
The junction station of Bitche is at an altitude of 307 metres and located at the kilometre point of 44.957 on the Haguenau–Hargarten-Falck line between the stations of Bitche Camp and Lemberg.

== History ==
Bitche station was opened on December 15, 1869, by the Chemins de fer de l'Est along with the section of the railway from Niederbronn to Sarreguemines. The railway section between Bitche and Niederbronn has been closed off in 1996 and has remained disused since. The Sarreguemines–Bitche section has had a substitute road service since December 18, 2011 following land subsidence and then performance that did not meet the expectation of the Regional Council of Lorraine.

- 8 December 1869: opening of the Sarreguemines–Niederbronn railway line
- 15 December 1869: opening of the Bitche station building
- Winter 1902: opening of the current station building built by the Germans
- 29 September 1996: freight traffic ended between Niederbronn and Bitche
- 4 November 1996: passenger services closed between Niederbronn and Bitche
- 18 December 2011: provisional closure of the railway line between Bitche and Sarreguemines
- 5 October 2014: permanent closure of the railway line between Bitche and Sarreguemines

== Passenger services ==
The station building and the railway line are fully and permanently closed. The railway line has been replaced by a TER Grand Est bus line.

== Gallery ==
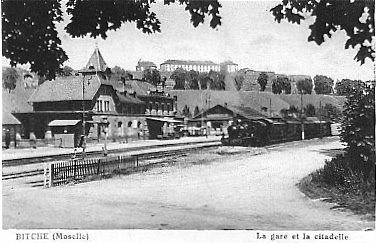
The station and the citadel in the early 1900s.

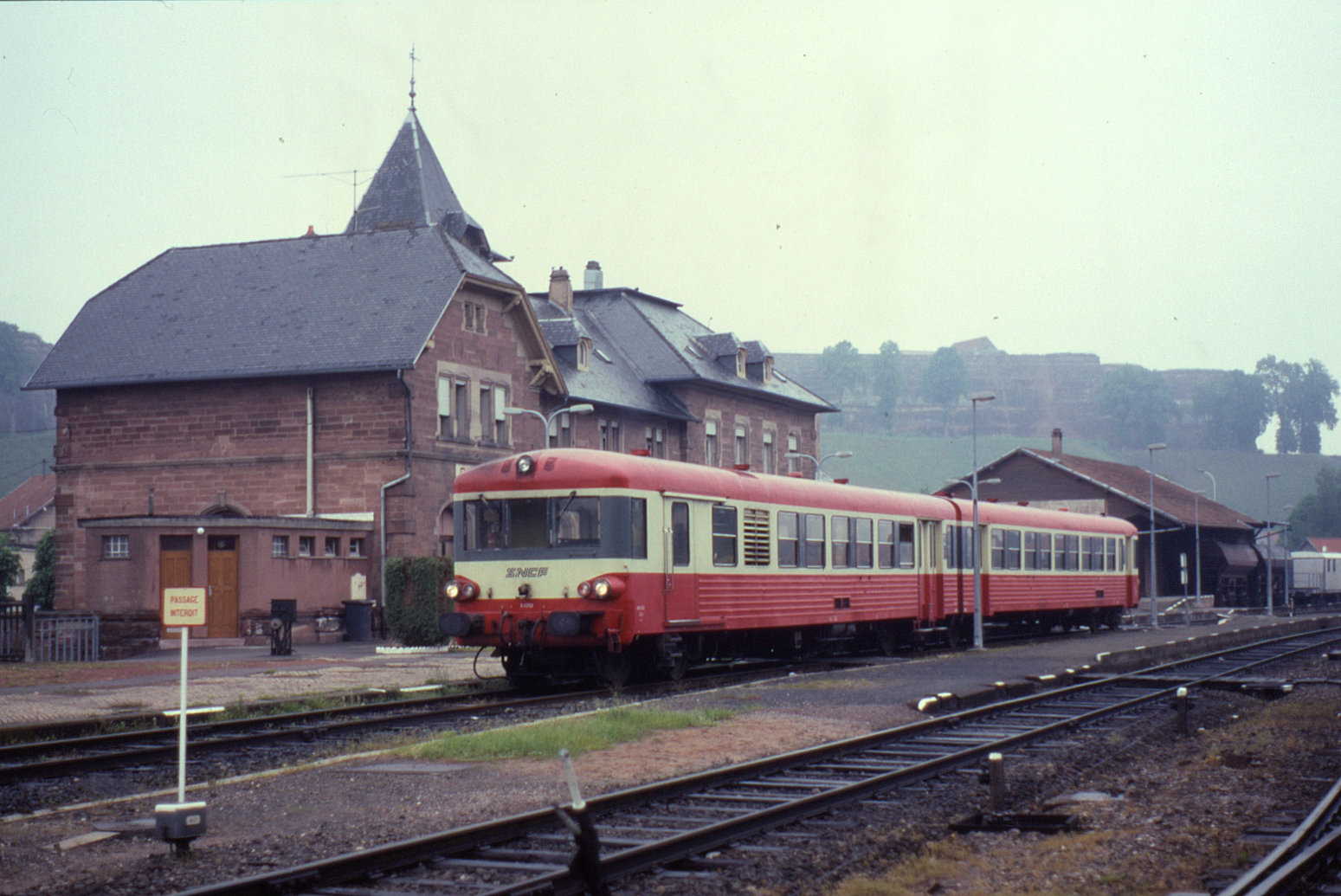
The station in 1991.

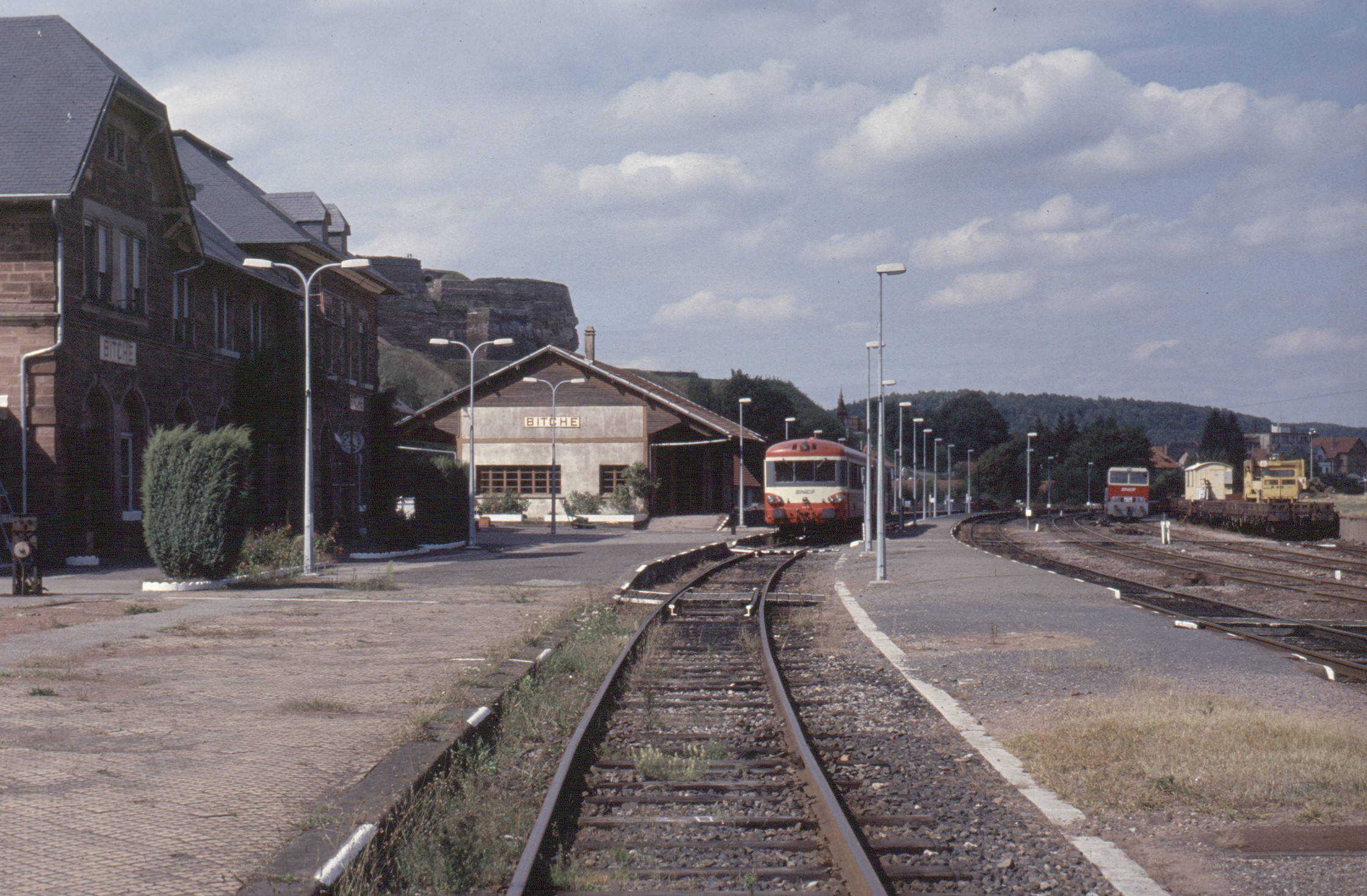
The platforms and tracks in 1993.

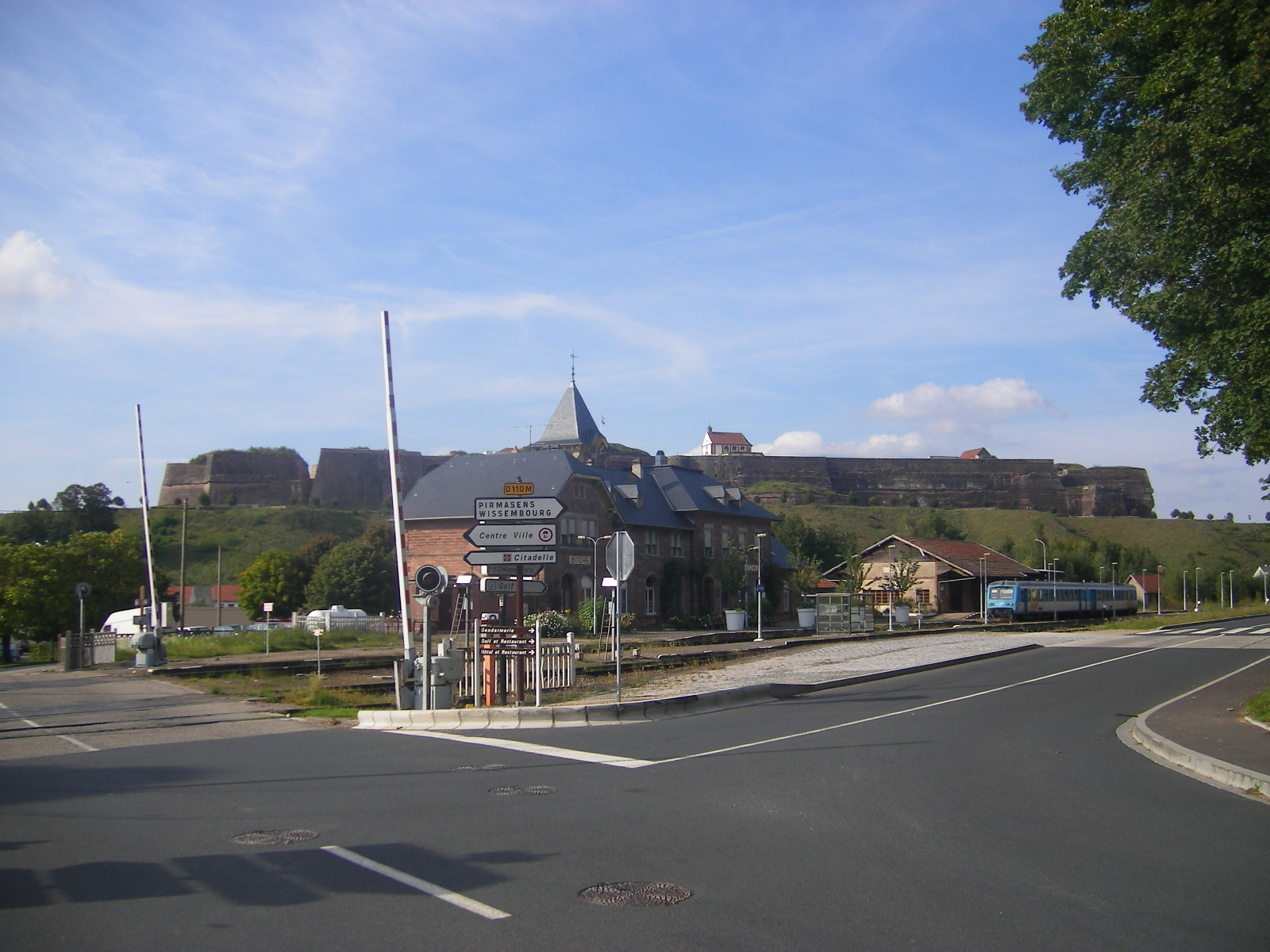
The station in 2007 with the citadel in the background.

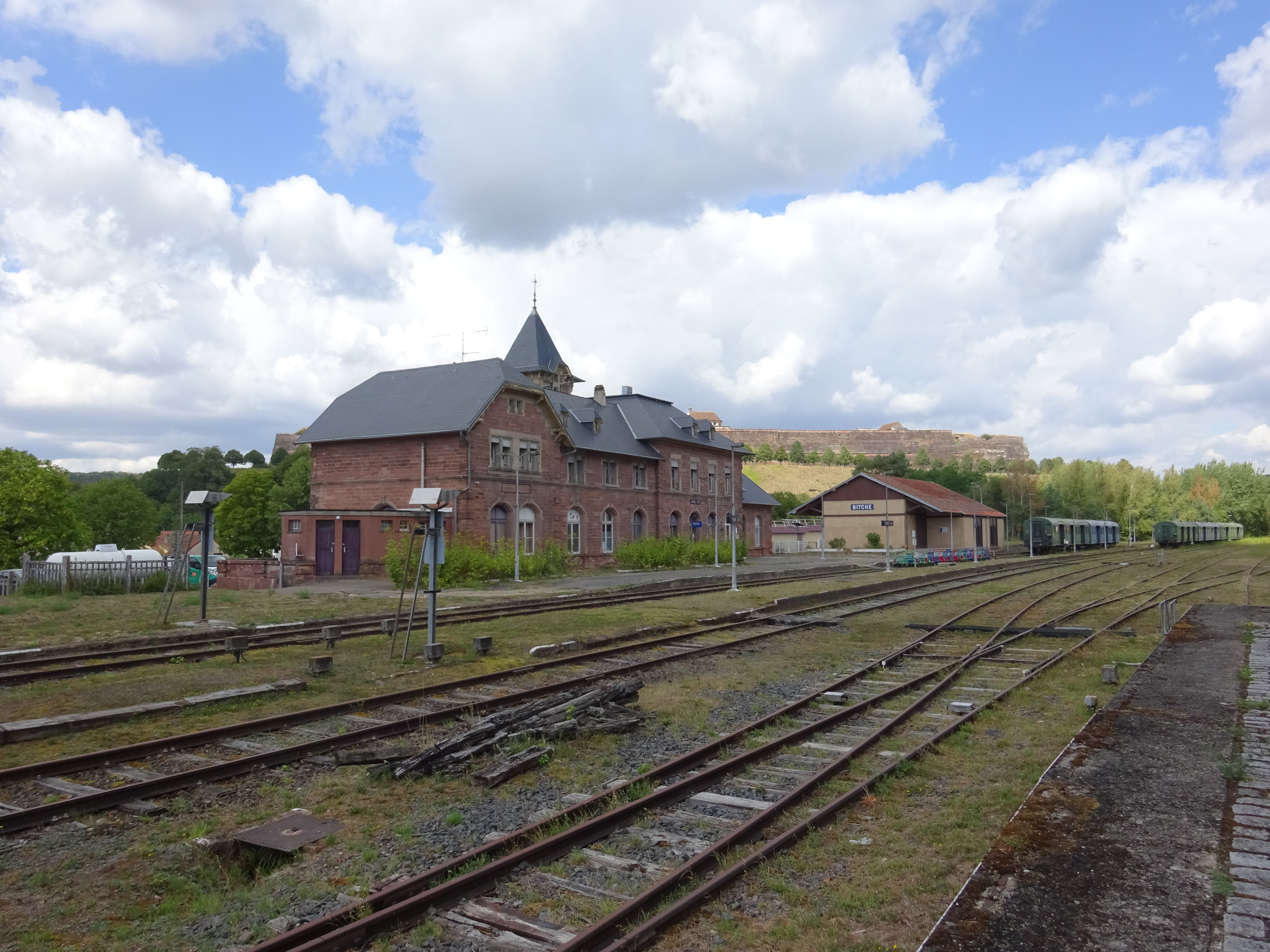
Tracks of the disused station in 2026.
