= Vandœuvre =

Vandœuvre may refer to:

- Vandœuvre-lès-Nancy, Meurthe-et-Moselle, France
- Vandœuvres, Switzerland

== See also ==
- Vendeuvre (disambiguation)
- Vendœuvres, Indre, France
