= Sarreguemines station =

Railway station in France

Sarreguemines
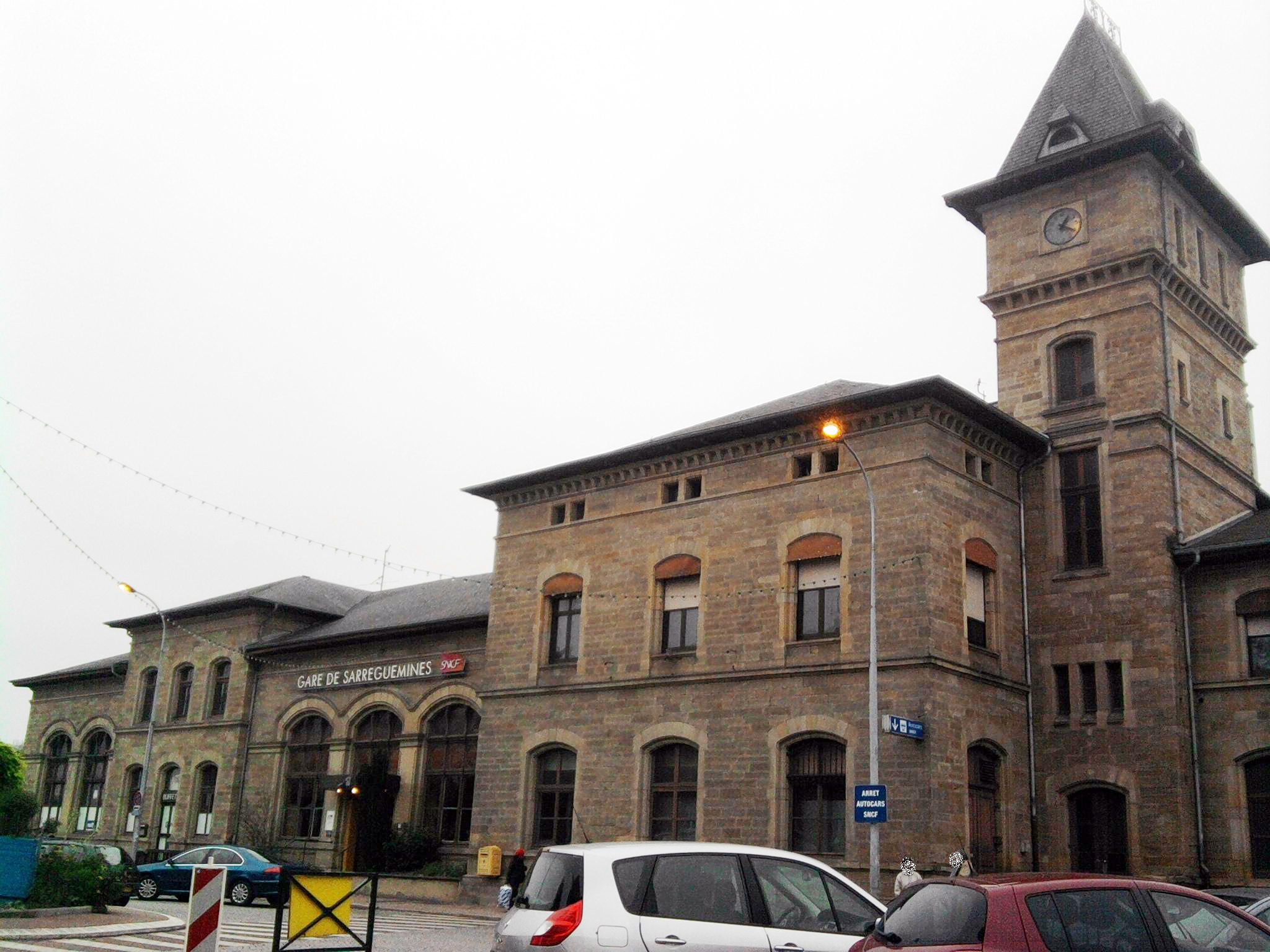
- Sarreguemines station and entrance

General information
- Location: place de la Gare; 57200 Sarreguemines
- Coordinates: 49.107073°N 7.068359°E
- Owner: SNCF
- Lines: Mommenheim–Sarreguemines; Saarbrücken–Sarreguemines; Haguenau–Hargarten-Falck; Sarreguemines–Bliesbruck; Berthelming–Sarreguemines
- Platforms: 3
- Tracks: 4

Other information
- Station code: 87193615

History
- Opened: 1 December 1865

Services
Preceding station	TER Grand Est	Following station
Saarbrücken Hbf Terminus	A06	Kalhausen towards Strasbourg
Farschviller towards Metz	L16	Terminus
Location
- Location within France Location within Grand Est

The Gare de Sarreguemines (German: Bahnhof Saargemünd) is a railway station near the French/German border on the Haguenau–Hargarten-Falck and the Saarbrücken–Sarreguemines lines, located in the town of Sarreguemines in the French department of Moselle.

It was opened in 1865 by the Chemins de fer de l'Est. It is now a station of the SNCF, served by regional express trains of the TER Grand Est. The border station is served by regional services running between Saarbrücken and Strasbourg. It is also served by the Saarbahn tram-train service.

== Location ==
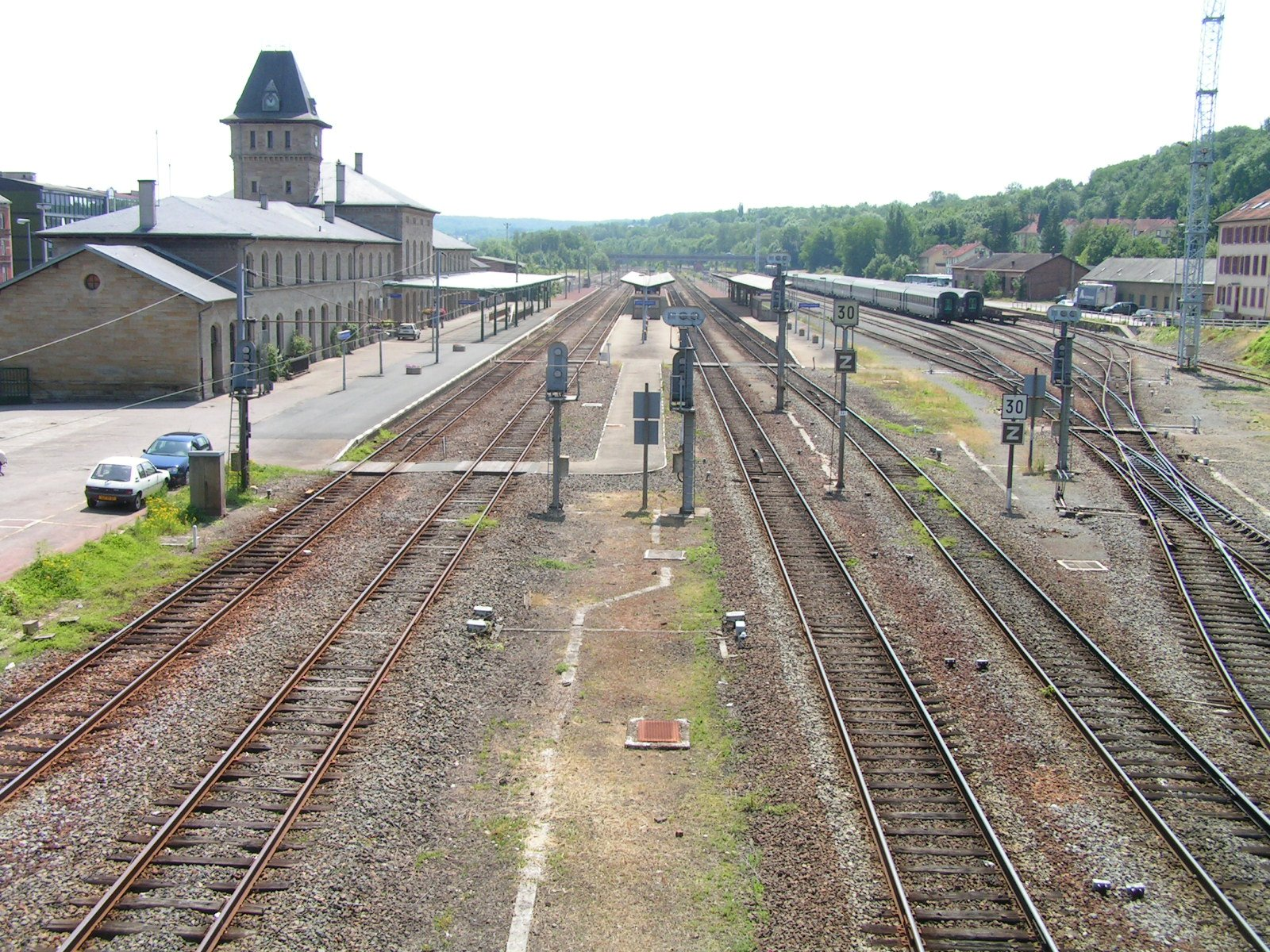
Station tracks

The junction station of Sarreguemines is at an altitude of 202 metres and located at the kilometre point of 84.025 on the Haguenau–Hargarten-Falck line between the stations of Wœlfling-lès-Sarreguemines and Hundling. The railway junction is the beginning of the Saarbrücken–Sarreguemines line, which connects to the German network, and the end of the Mommenheim–Sarreguemines railway.

It is the only French station electrified with a non-French electrical system (15 kV, 16.7 Hz AC of Deutsche Bahn) and not connected by overhead wires to the rest of the national rail network. This situation is the result of its use by the services of the Saarbahn.

== History ==
Sarreguemines station was opened on 16 December 1865 by the Chemins de fer de l'Est along with the section of the railway from Béning to Sarreguemines and the siding to the Sarreguemines pottery. It was officially inaugurated a few days earlier, on 2 December, with "a large crowd" to greet the official train when it arrived next to the temporary wooden building.

- 8 December 1869: opening of the Sarreguemines–Niederbronn line
- 1 June 1870: opening of the Sarreguemines–Saarbrücken line
- 1 November 1872: opening of the line from Sarreguemines to Berthelming (and Sarrebourg)
- 1 March 1879: opening of the Blies Valley Railway (German: Bliestalbahn) from Sarreguemines to Homburg and Zweibrücken
- 1 March 1895: opening of the Sarreguemines–Kalhausen line
- 1 March 1895: opening of the line from Kalhausen to Sarralbe and Mommenheim
- 1950: removal of the second track between Sarreguemines and Bliesbruck and between Sarralbe and Hambach
- 4 October 1952: closure of passenger services over the French/German border between Bliesbruck and Reinheim on the Sarreguemines–Homburg line; freight traffic ended between Saarguemines and Reinheim in 1974
- 4 July 1971: closure of the line between Sarreguemines and Sarralbe via Hambach
- 22 April 1983: extension of electrification of the Saarbrücken–Sarreguemines line from Hanweiler station to Sarreguemines
- 24 October 1997: inauguration of tram-train operations of the Saarbahn over the border between Sarreguemines and Saarbrücken

== Passenger services ==
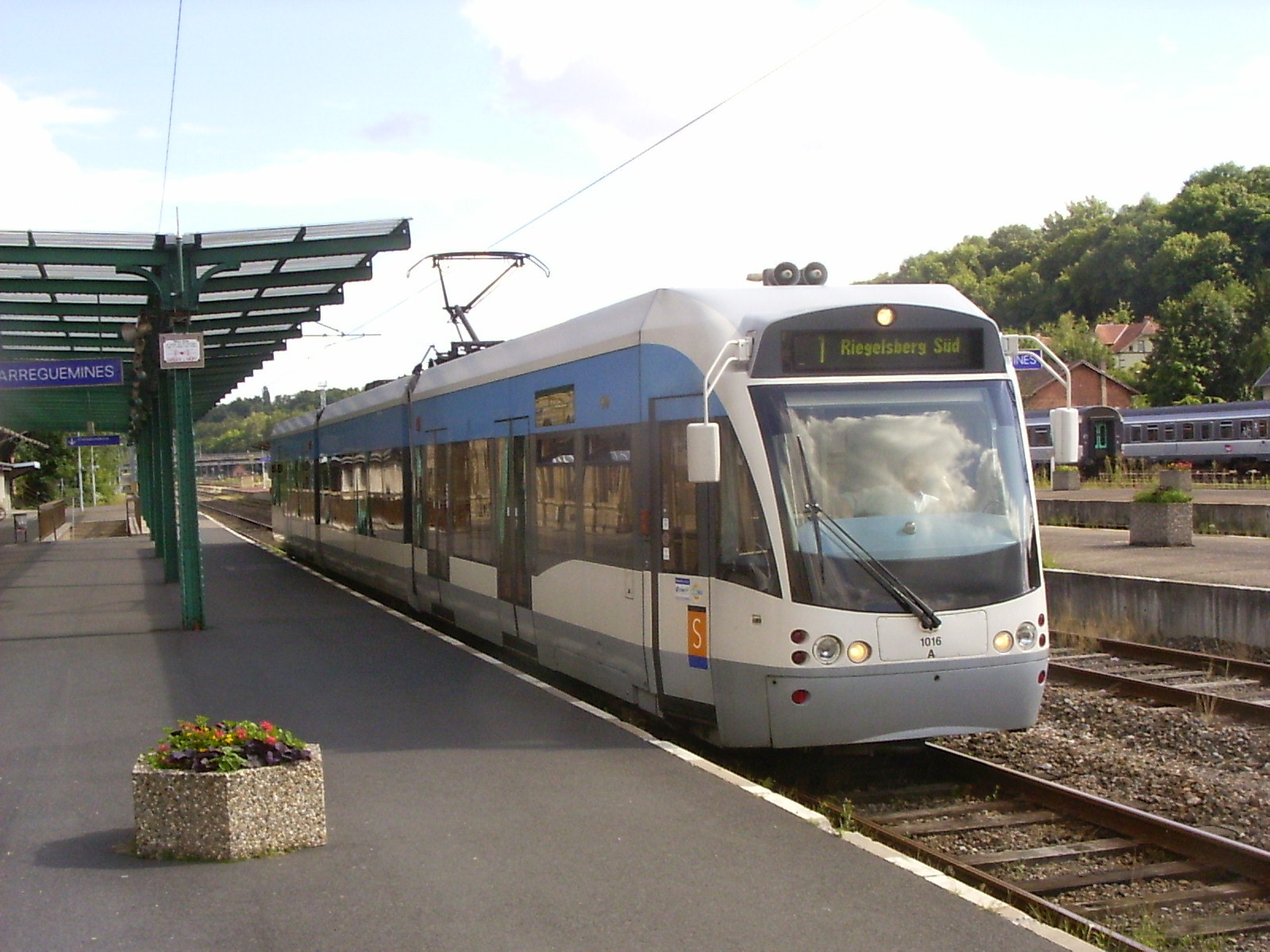
Tram-train of the Saarbahn.

The station building has a ticket office, which is open daily. It is equipped with tickets machines for rail travel and for the Saarbahn tram-train.

=== Services ===
Sarreguemines is served by TER Grand Est trains operating on lines: L16 (Metz-Béning–Sarreguemines), L18 (Sarreguemines–Sarre-Union) and A06 (Strasbourg–Sarreguemines–Saarbrücken).

It is also served by the tram-trains on line S1 (currently the only line) of the Saarbahn (Lebach–Saarbrücken–Sarreguemines).

The Sarreguemines–Bitche line has had a substitute road service since 18 December 2011 following land subsidence and then performance that did not meet the expectation of the Regional Council of Lorraine.

=== Other modes ===
The station has a car park. It is served by city buses operated by CABUS and coaches operated by TER Grand Est and the network of Transports Interurbains de la Moselle (TIM).
