= Troyes station =

French railway station

Coordinates: 48°17′45″N 4°3′53″E

Troyes
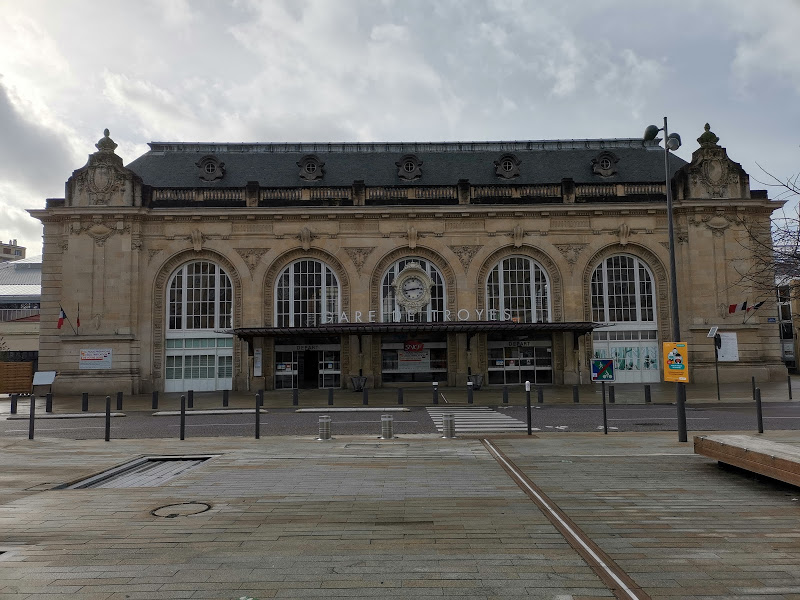
- Station facade

General information
- Location: Cour de la Gare; 10000 Troyes; Aube, France
- Owner: SNCF
- Operator: SNCF
- Train operators: TER Grand Est

History
- Opened: 7 April 1848

Passengers
- 2024: 1,447,394
Location

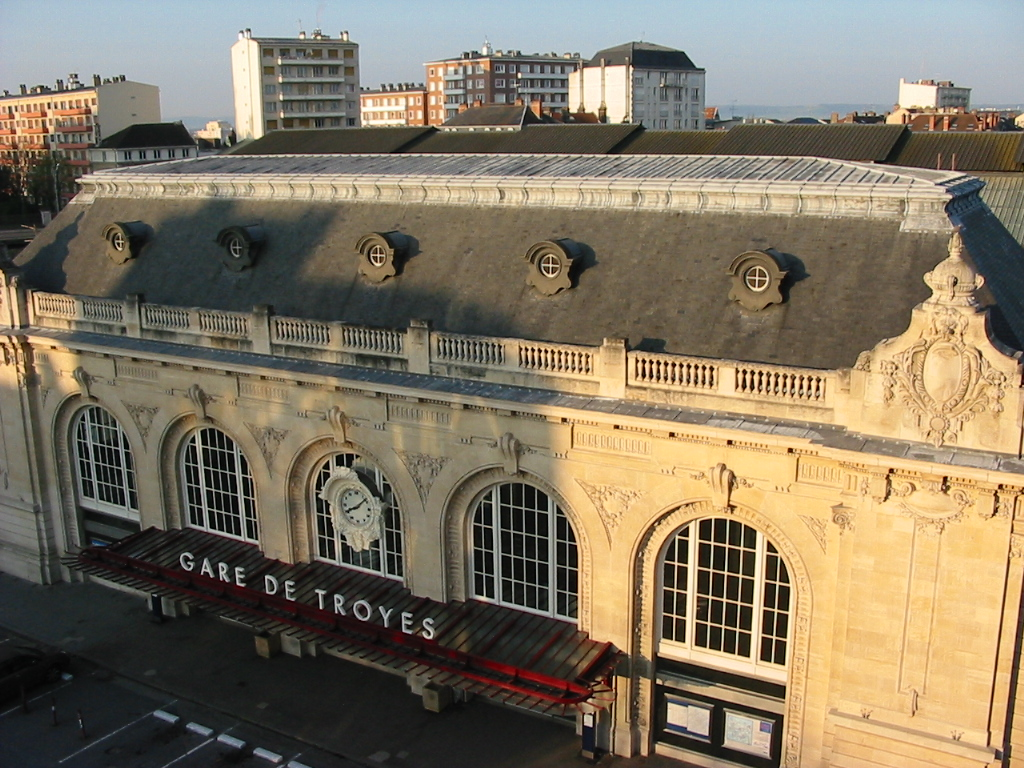
Station passenger building

Troyes station (French: Gare de Troyes) is a railway station serving the town Troyes, Aube department, central France. It is situated on the Paris–Mulhouse railway. The station is served by regional trains towards Paris and Chaumont.

Preceding station	TER Grand Est	Following station
Romilly-sur-Seine towards Paris-Est	C04	Vendeuvre towards Mulhouse or Dijon

== See also ==
- List of SNCF stations in Grand Est
