= Sarrebourg station =

Railway station in Sarrebourg, France

Sarrebourg
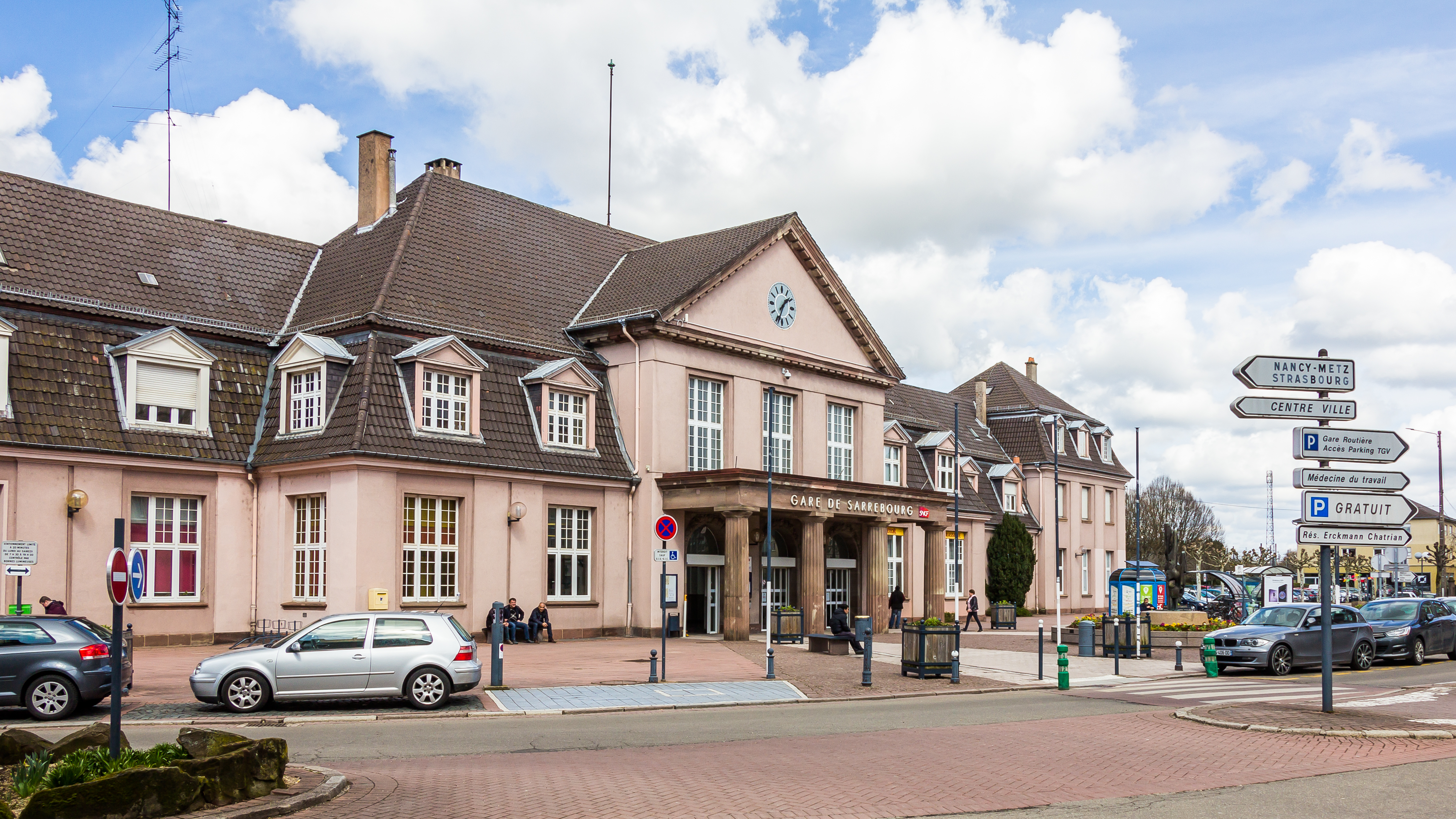
- Travellers building and entrance of the station

General information
- Location: Place de la gare, 57400 Sarrebourg
- Coordinates: 48°44′18″N 7°03′10″E
- Owner: SNCF
- Lines: Paris–Strasbourg railway, Strasbourg–Metz railway, Sarrebourg–Abreschviller railway
- Tracks: 5 + service tracks

Construction
- Parking: yes
- Cycle facilities: yes

Other information
- Station code: 87215012
- Website: Gare de Sarrebourg

History
- Opened: 29 mai 1851
- Rebuilt: 1 juin 1923
Location

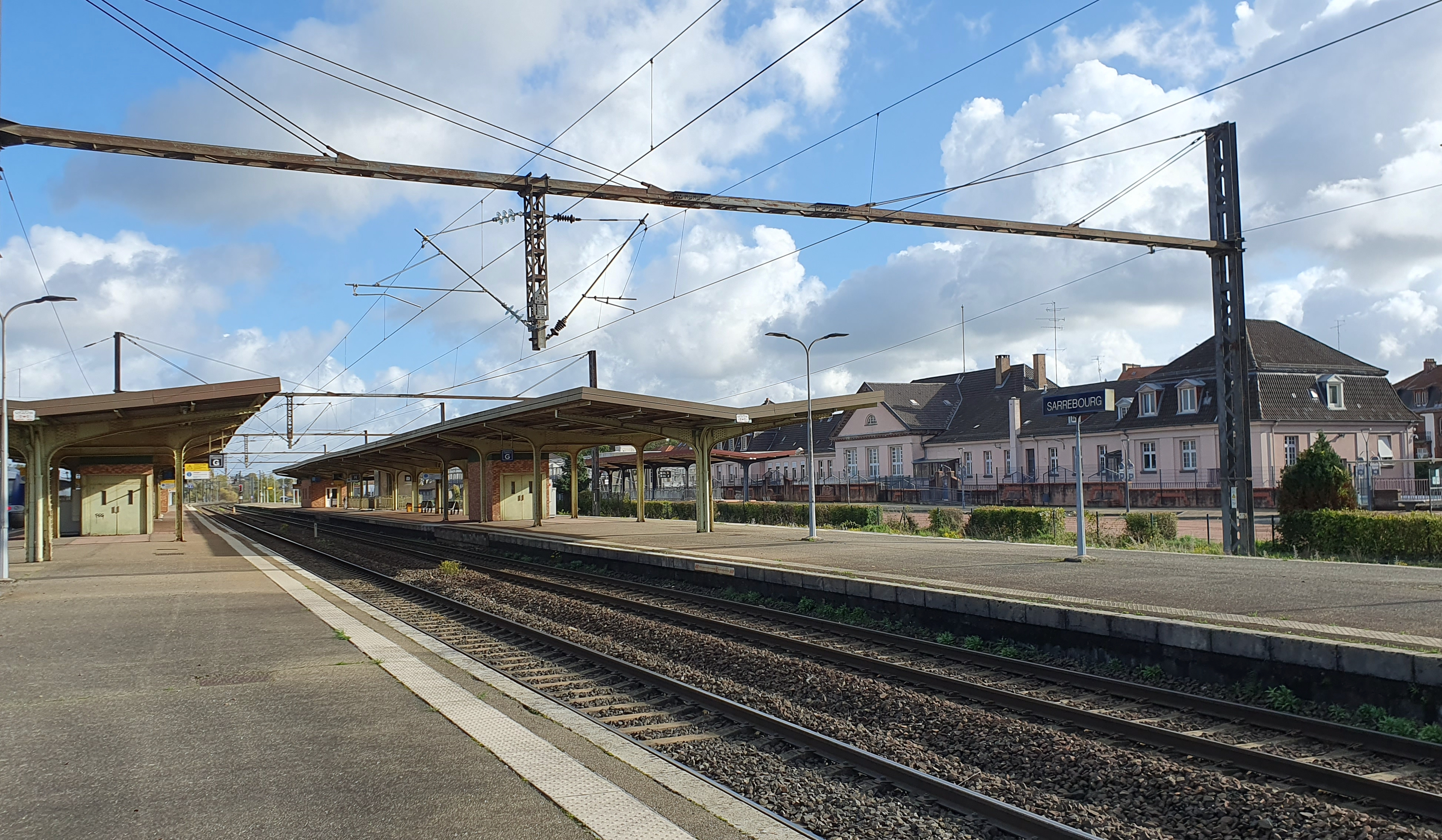
Sarrebourg Station, view from the platform

Sarrebourg station is a railway station serving the town Sarrebourg, Moselle department, northeastern France. It is situated on the Paris–Strasbourg railway.

The first station was put in operation in 1851 by the Strasbourg–Basel railway company, which operates the section between the cities of Strasbourg and Sarrebourg on request by the Paris–Strasbourg railway company.

As of 2022, it is a travellers station of the SNCF, belonging to the regional railway network TER Grand Est. It is served by TGV (high speed) trains and by regional express transport trains.

The station is served by trains towards Paris-Est, Strasbourg, Metz and Nancy.

Preceding station	TER Grand Est	Following station
Réding towards Strasbourg	A03	Terminus
Igney–Avricourt towards Nancy	A13	Réding towards Strasbourg
Berthelming towards Metz	A14	Réding towards Strasbourg
Lunéville towards Paris-Est	C02	Saverne towards Strasbourg
