= Culmont =

- Commune
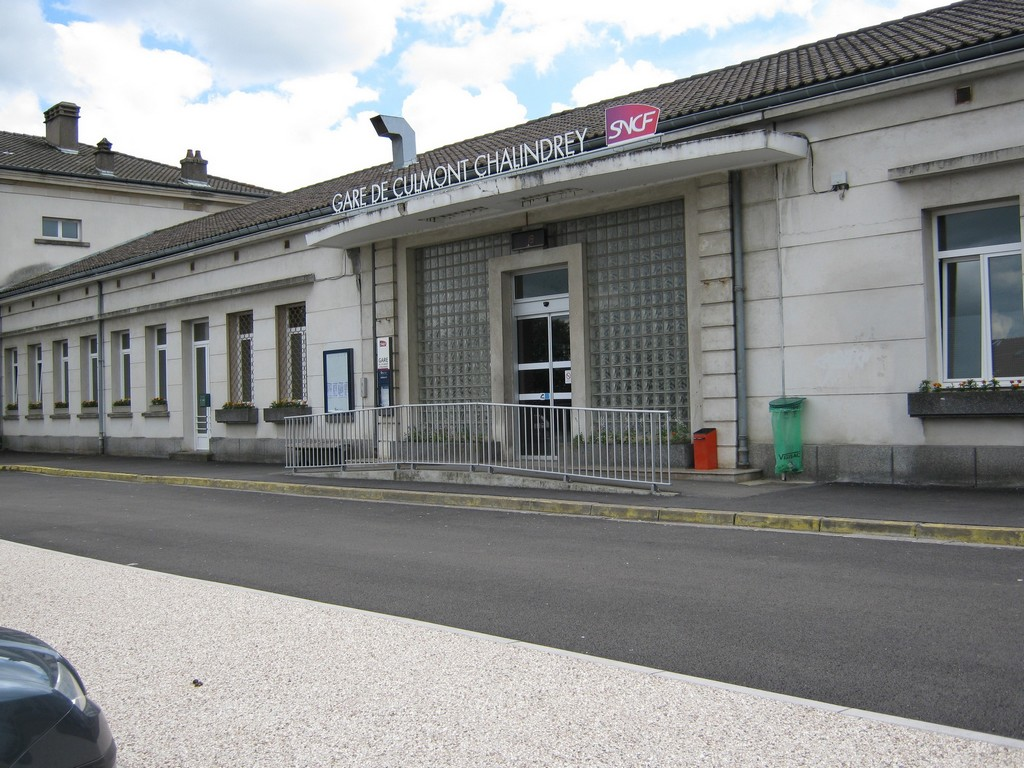
- The Culmont Chalindrey railway station
- Location of Culmont
- Location within France Location within Grand Est
- Coordinates: 47°49′19″N 5°26′28″E
- Country: France
- Region: Grand Est
- Department: Haute-Marne
- Arrondissement: Langres
- Canton: Chalindrey

Government
  - Mayor (2020–2026): Jacques Hun
- Area^{1}: 8.29 km^{2} (3.20 sq mi)
- Elevation: 313 m (1,027 ft)
- Highest elevation: 414 m (1,358 ft)
- Lowest elevation: 302 m (991 ft)
- Population (2023): 538
  - Density: 64.9/km^{2} (168/sq mi)
- Time zone: UTC+01:00 (CET)
  - Summer (DST): UTC+02:00 (CEST)
- INSEE/Postal code: 52155 /52600
- ^{1} French Land Register data, which excludes lakes, ponds, glaciers > 1 km^{2} (0.386 sq mi or 247 acres) and river estuaries.

Culmont (French pronunciation: [kylmɔ̃]) is a commune in the Haute-Marne department in north-eastern France. Culmont-Chalindrey station is an important railway junction.

== See also ==
- Communes of the Haute-Marne department
