= Château de Vendeuvre =

Château in Normandy, France

Coordinates: 48°59′13″N 0°4′43″W

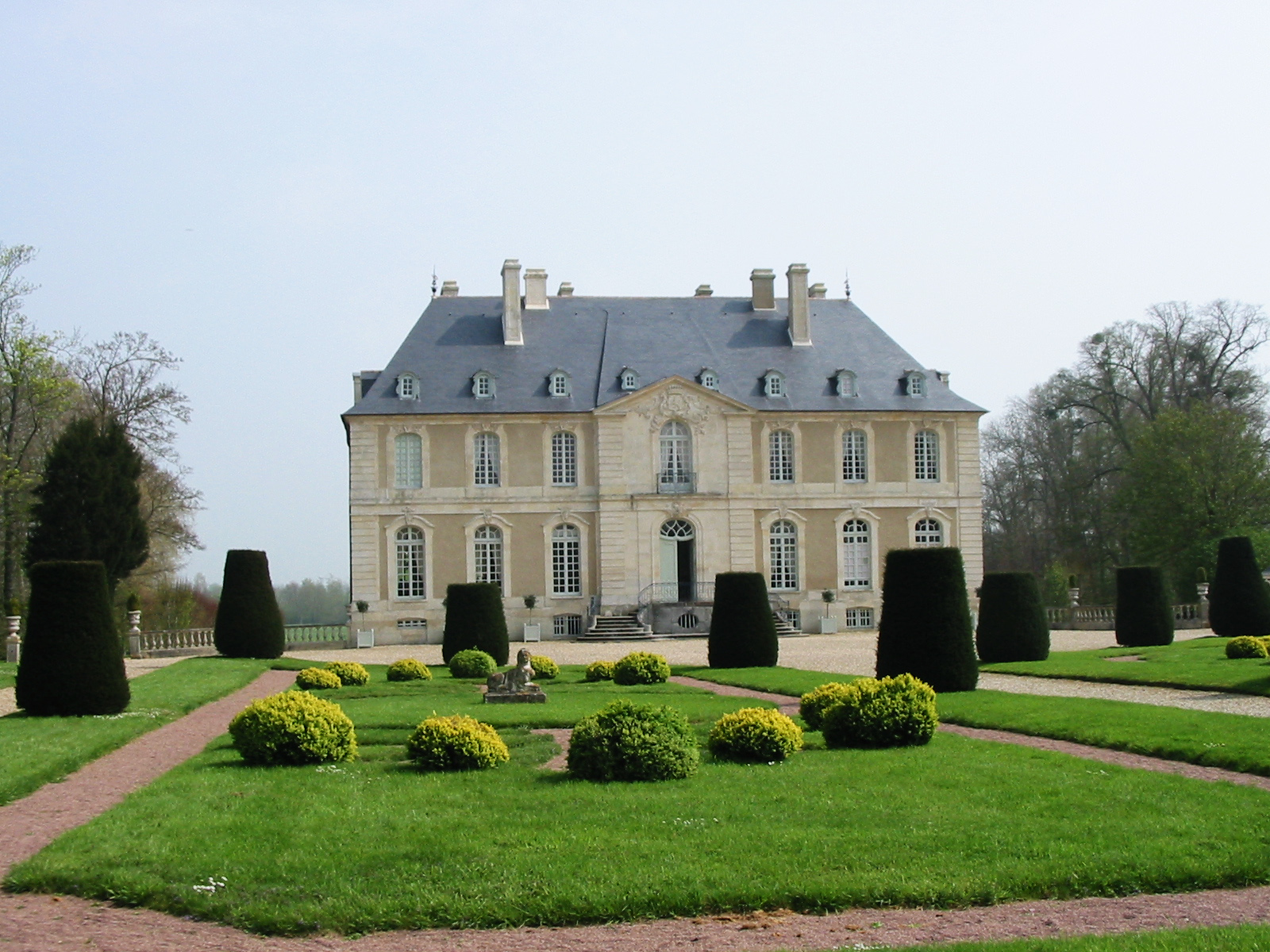
Château de Vendeuvre

The Château de Vendeuvre (pronounced [ʃɑto də vɑ̃dœvʁ]) is situated in the commune of Vendeuvre, near to Lisieux in Normandy. Classed as a Historic Monument both for its exterior and interior, Vendeuvre is a prototypical aristocratic Norman country house. It was opened to the public in 1983. The gardens were classified as a Jardins remarquables by the Ministry of Culture and the Comité des Parcs et Jardins de France in 2004.

== For the visitor to see ==
- State rooms giving a taste of daily life in the 18th century.
- The extensive museum of miniature furniture.
- 18th-century kitchens.
- A collection of furniture and bedding for pampered pets.
- Formal, utility and water gardens.
- A shell-lined grotto.
- Pavilions and follies

== History ==
Vendeuvre was built between 1750 and 1752 from the plans of architect Jacques-François Blondel and is a great example of a country house (maison de campagne) of the eighteenth century. Its owner, Alexandre Le Forestier, ‘'seigneur’' of Vendeuvre, coming from a Cotentin family that claimed descent from the Counts of Flanders, wanted a modern summer retreat built in the style of the day. The old manor-house was demolished, as it was damp (it was closer to the Dives river banks than the present building) and built partially into the hillside slope.

During the French Revolution, Alexander of Vendeuvre and his family lived at Rouen, their house at Caen having been burned down. As the family did not emigrate during the Revolution, the château was saved from destruction, thus preserving the original décor and most of the furnishings.

The château is famous for its eighteenth-century interiors. Blondel paid particular attention to the highly sophisticated interior circulation and decoration. The facade is deliberately not ostentatious, as, according to Blondel, in his influential architectural thesis, ‘it is absolutely vital to avoid useless ornamentation and excessive facades that detract from the quality of what is inside’. After the château was damaged during the Second World War, the present Count of Vendeuvre, a direct descendant of Alexander of Vendeuvre, set about the complete internal and exterior renovation of the chateau. The slate roof was re-laid in 1945. Following the completion of the interior renovation, the park's restoration followed in 1970, using the original 1813 plans as a basis for the garden's classic French style. In 1983 the Orangery was restored to its former state, having also been badly damaged as a result of action during the war.

== Interior ==
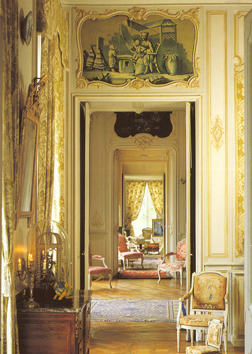
The suite of rooms en filades

In the presentation of the château, each room presents a theme of eighteenth century daily life. Automatons (mannequins with recordings) point out the salient features of each room:

- The dining room demonstrates the art of receiving and entertaining guests.
- The state bedroom, with many wardrobes, is devoted to dressing and make-up. The automaton represents a lady of the time, enjoying the pleasures of washing and dressing in her boudoir.
- The office exhibits paraphernalia associated with writing. .
- The small parlour displays family portraits.
- The Grand Salon shows the pleasures of indoor games.

The chateau's plan shows that it is twice as wide as it is deep, with a suite of state rooms distributed around a central hall supported by Ionic columns. The layout of the suites (each leads to the next) and the rounding of all the corners, help to spread the natural light throughout each room. The quality of the wood panelling in the main room is remarkable. The furniture is a comprehensive list of 18th century craftsmanship.

There are many curiosities too: a chandelier with real goldfish in a bowl, a travelling enema kit and a ‘'voyeuse’', a chair with a padded elbow-rest upon which elegant ladies would kneel or sit whilst playing indoor games, so as not to crumple the arrangement of their dresses over wide panniers.

== The Kitchen ==
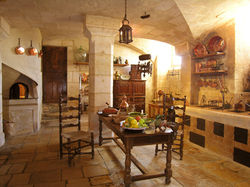
The Kitchen

Copper and tin vessels of all shapes and sizes, with old earthenware and faience containers, give the impression that this beautifully arranged kitchen could still be used. Under the stone vaulted ceiling, in the huge fireplace, stands a mechanical rotisserie, still in working order. In a corner of the fireplace there is an oven, which was used for broiling and pot-roasting. In the other corner of the fireplace, lumps of wood were permanently smoldering. These were transported, using large pans, to the oven opposite, or to one of the five smaller fireplaces situated in the wall opposite, where slow-cooked dishes, such as soups and sauces were prepared. Set into the wall of another corner is a smaller oven once used for pastry-baking. All the wood ash would have been collected and sifted for use in the household laundry.

== Pet pampering ==
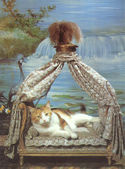
Cat's bed - France, Louis XV period

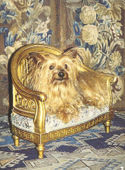
Dog's chair - France, 19th century

In a room next to the kitchen is a unique collection of pet-carriers, baskets and kennels. Small dogs and cats were the object of much care and attention, as testified by the refinement and variety of sumptuous places in which they lived, slept and travelled. Some were even provided with bedding matched to the full-sized furniture of the room in which they were placed, others were miniature versions of the furniture, but gilded. Some of the very ornate kennels had three compartments. The cat's bed, in the photograph opposite, is à la polonaise with a dais and drawn-up curtains, and was made for one of the daughters of Louis XV for her pet. Louis XV himself had a King Charles Spaniel called Filou (Rascal). Its bed was a cushion of crimson velvet and it wore a gold collar encrusted with diamonds. Louis XV said of his dog: “He’s the only thing in the world that likes me for myself”. These small ‘pet-dwellings’ are extremely rare and unusual reminders of times past, when pets were often looked after better than the workers of the estate.

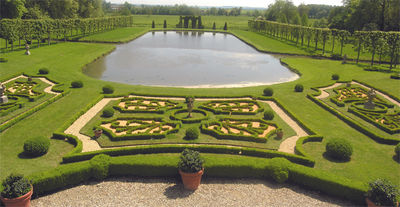
The formal parterre of lawn and gravel with box-hedging

== The Gardens ==
=== Formal Gardens ===
The formal gardens that have been created by the present Count of Vendeuvre, have a strictly symmetrical classical lay-out of closely clipped scrolling designs set against gravel reserves, and borders and box hedges set in lawns, with a formal water beyond, flanked by pollarded lime trees (lindens), against a background of mature woodlands. Beyond the sloping fields of the valley of the river Dives, the hills of the Pays d'Auge can be seen in the far distance.

Restored according to plans, of 1813, these French geometric gardens perfectly complement the equally symmetrical garden front of the château.

=== Utility gardens ===
An avenue of 150-year-old limes or lindens, to the side of the chateau, marks the area of the ‘practical’ or ‘utility’ gardens. An essential part of the château during the 18th – 20th centuries, providing much home-grown food, the so-called practical gardens include:

- A fish pond containing, at one end, trout for special occasions and at the other end, separated by netting, the more common freshwater fish for Fridays and other fasting days. The fish would have been fed from kitchen scraps and pellets of flour.
- A dovecote, rebuilt in 1811, which has over 1400 dove holes. The roof was designed to catch some rainwater for the birds to bathe in.
- An Ice House built as a pyramid, to store the ice from the pond in the winter maze. It has a north-facing door to better help preserve the low temperature within.

=== The 'Surprise' water gardens ===
During the Renaissance, mankind became fascinated by hydraulic mechanisms. They were particularly fashionable in France in the 17th and 18th centuries, to entertain, amaze and charm. To add a further dimension to their parks and gardens, artificial devices to imitate nature have found their place, most notably in the form of fountains.

==== The Crystal Tree ====
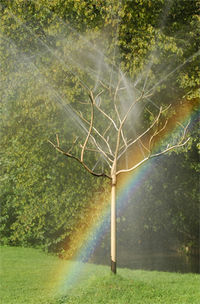
The Crystal Tree

Linked to a legend from antiquity, of a tree that drew, by its roots, all science and wisdom. Around it, plants were cultivated and fertilized by the spirits of the place. This celestial tree offered, to those that it chose, a dew that transmitted wisdom and eternity. Since earliest times, trees have been the object of worship, perhaps because their roots attain the underground depths and their branches symbolize the aspiration of ascension towards the sky.

==== The fountain of the Muses ====
Inspired by another legend, this time of a young gardener discouraged by the failure of his garden, who went looking for help from the Hippocrene fountain, created when Pegasus had kicked the ground with his hooves. Whoever drank of the water was sure to be inspired by the Muses. Once asleep, the gardener dreamt of four men: a gardening technician, a man of good taste, a poet and a painter. They said to him that they, individually, were incapable of creating a great garden, but that together they had built the most beautiful gardens of the world. On his awakening, the gardener tried the fountain's water whilst praying that the Muses would grant him the four gifts necessary to his profession: technique, good taste, poetry and art. Laughing, they instead gave him green fingers.

==== The tortoise cascade ====
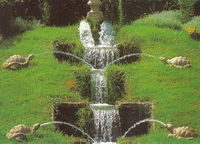
The tortoise cascade

The tortoise plays an important role in the mythology of many cultures. In Central America, according to an ancient legend, the rain god Chaac had fallen under the charms of a beautiful goddess and forsaken the land. A severe drought reigned throughout the country of the Mayas but Chaac no longer heard the invocations of the priests. As a last recourse, the Mayas asked the sacred tortoises to intervene with the rain god. Hoisted on the roof of the temples and houses, the tortoises called out his name “Chaac” as one voice, which brought him to his senses. At his invitation, the tortoises spat water, quenching the thirst of the Mayans and saving the harvests.

==== The water nymph’s grotto ====
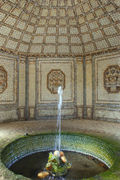
The grotto

Neptune, Greek god of the sea, was enticed by the beautiful and wise nymph, Cléance. One day, he threw himself upon her, but Cléance defended herself so well that Neptune backed off. "The coldness of rock will suit you", he said, transforming her immediately into stone. Shocked by this, the other nymphs implored Thetis to intercede with the gods on Olympus for the restoration of her life. Not being able to do anything against the power of Neptune, they agreed on a compromise: Cléance would remain a stone statue but inside, her heart could carry on beating.

==== The Shell Grotto ====
Under an exotic copper-roofed pavilion is a "cool room" where one can rest during hot summer days. According to Greco-Roman mythology, a young nymph, followed by the god Pan, took refuge in the cave, taking on the form of a fountain of pure water. This grotto is inspired by that mythological cave. The 200,000 shells used on the walls at Vendeuvre help to recreate the supernatural atmosphere that suits a dwelling of the nymphs.

==== The Temple of Serenity ====
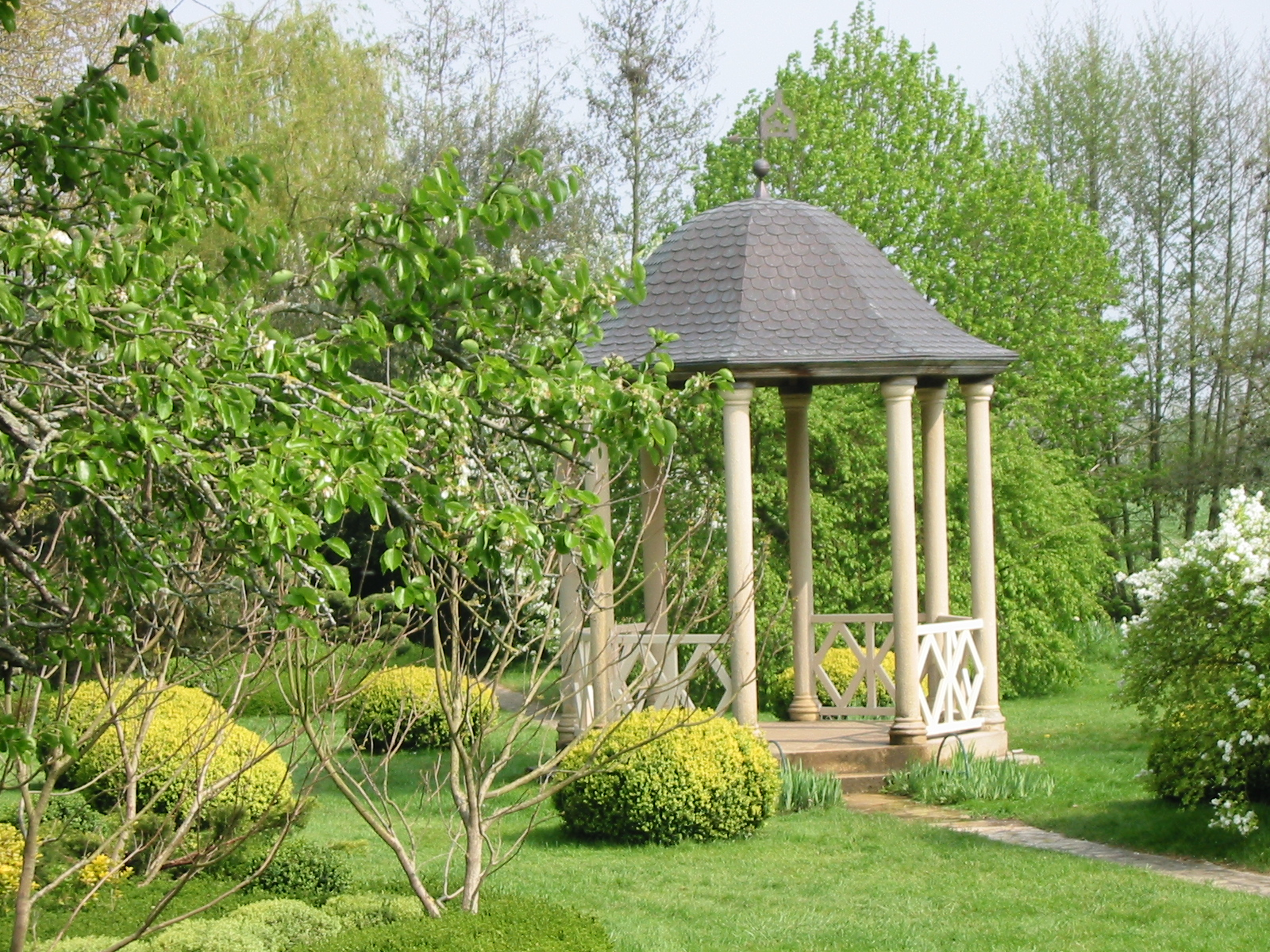
The Temple of Serenity

Evocative of the story of a powerful king in a rich country where the inhabitants were very happy. The King, always a worrier, was continually dissatisfied with his position and with that of his kingdom. He went to consult the Wise Woman of the Lost Wood that prescribed meditation at the ‘temple of the eight columns’. The king entered the temple but after only a few minutes all his problems had returned. He was going to leave when it began to rain all around the temple, preventing him from leaving. Little by little, the light music of the raindrops on the ground helped lighten his anguish. Passing through the veil of rain, all at last seemed well with the world. On the ground in front of each column of the temple was a single letter, carved out by the rainwater. The letters spelt the word “SERENITY”

==== The Chinese bridge ====
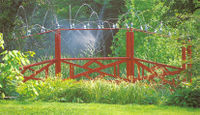
The Chinese bridge

Chinese legend has it that a very beautiful girl named Yin never tired of looking at her own reflection in the water whenever she took a walk across the red bridge. Han, the bird-catcher, opened his heart to her, but Yin rejected it, because the water only showed the reflection of his graceless face. Moved by the sadness of the bird-catcher, the doves began to spit in the water, which immediately reflected the souls of the two young people. Yin's reflection became distorted by her vanity whilst Han's reflection illuminated the surface. This vision melted the heart of Yin and the couple loved each other so much that, on certain evenings, one can make out their silhouettes leaning on the scarlet bridge.

=== The Mazes ===
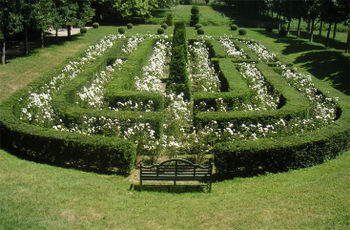
The regular labyrinth

Labyrinths were places of escape. It was said that whenever anyone had worries, a walk in the mysterious labyrinth helped one escape the real world if only for a short time. The gardens of the château of Vendeuvre contain two mazes, known as the 'regular maze' and the 'field maze'

- The regular labyrinth is a mass of yew hedging and white rose bushes in the lawn.
- The field labyrinth covers a surface of one hectare. A green paradise of rare trees and many wonders, towards the Japanese tea pavilion. Here, all visitors are encouraged to take part in the hunt for a small rabbit.
