= Wissembourg station =

Railway station in Wissembourg, France

Coordinates: 49°01′54″N 7°57′00″E

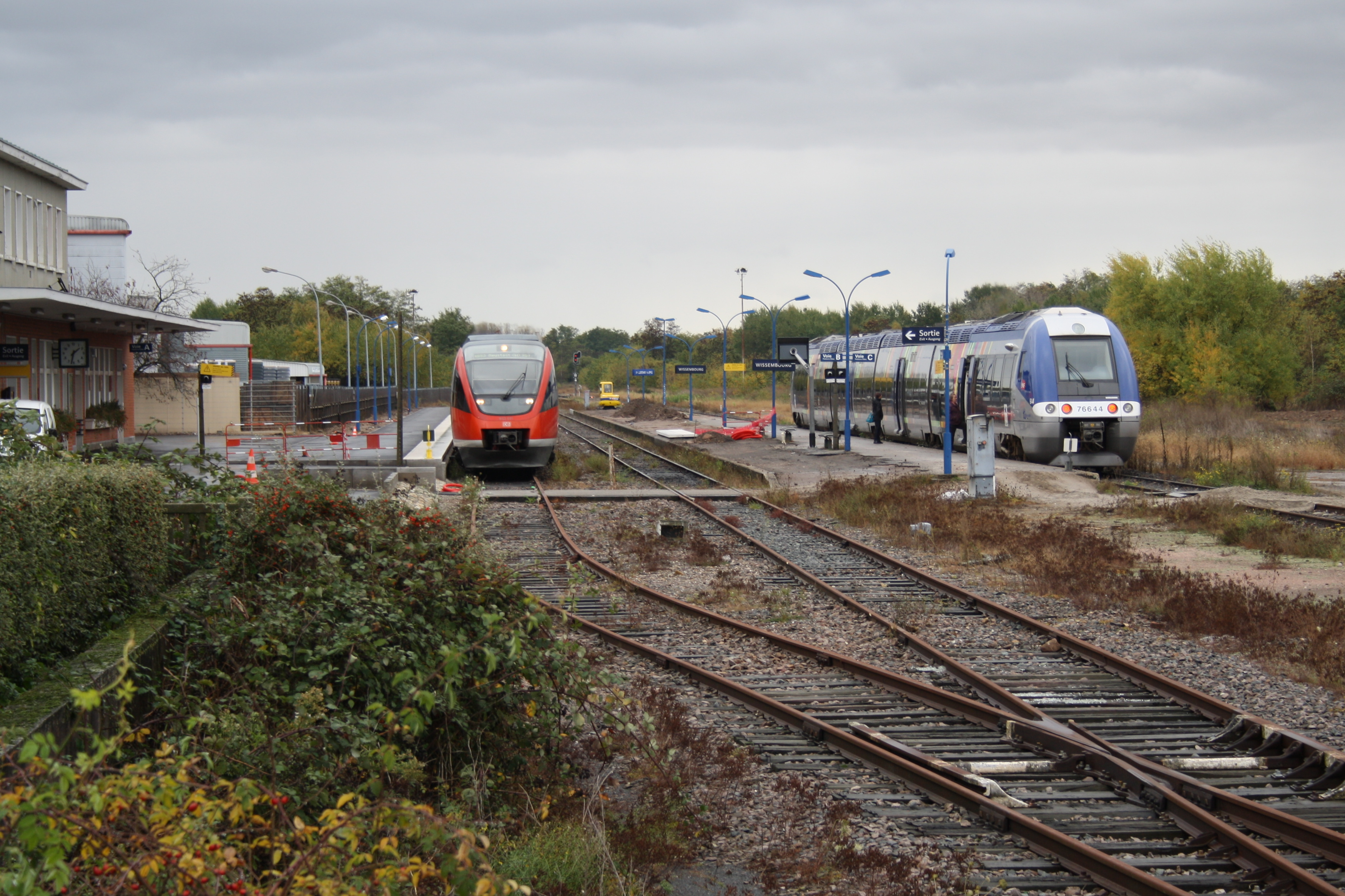
A French and a German train

Wissembourg station is a railway station serving the town of Wissembourg in the department of Bas-Rhin in northeastern France. It is a terminus station at the junction of two railway lines: towards Strasbourg and Neustadt an der Weinstraße (Germany). The station is served by regional trains towards Haguenau and Strasbourg (TER Grand Est) and towards Landau and Neustadt an der Weinstraße (Deutsche Bahn).

== Gallery ==
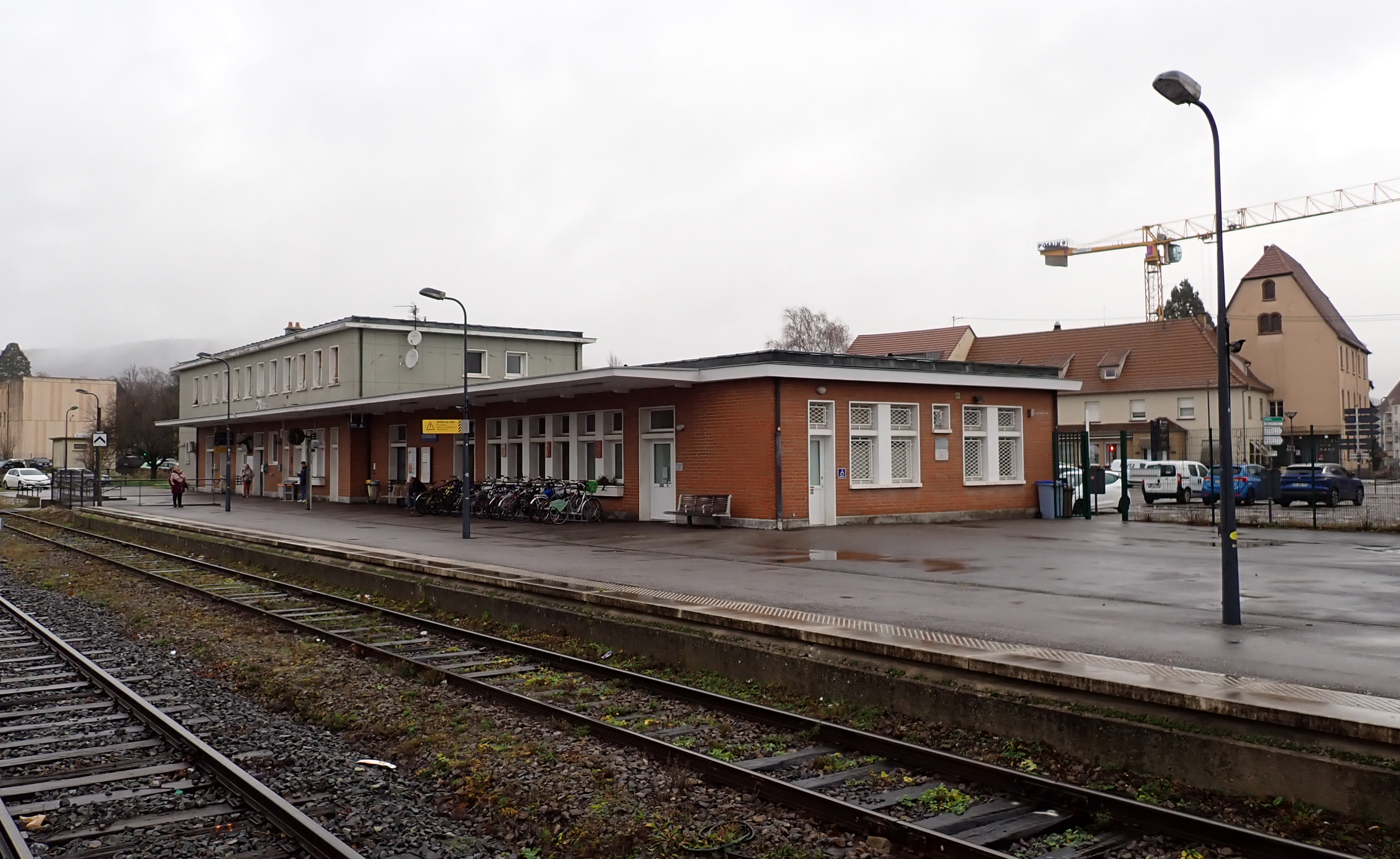
Wissembourg train station

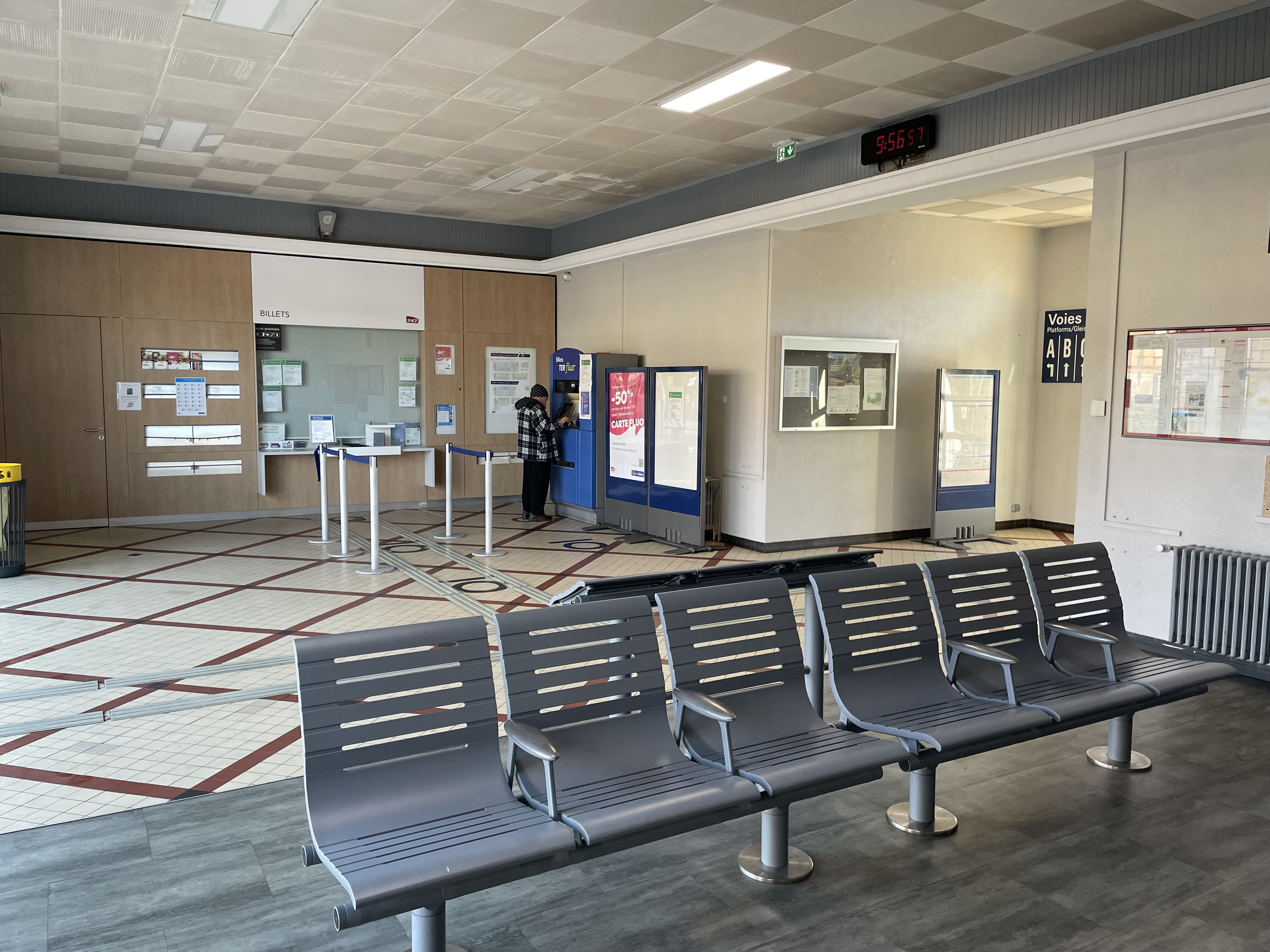
Arrival hall at the station

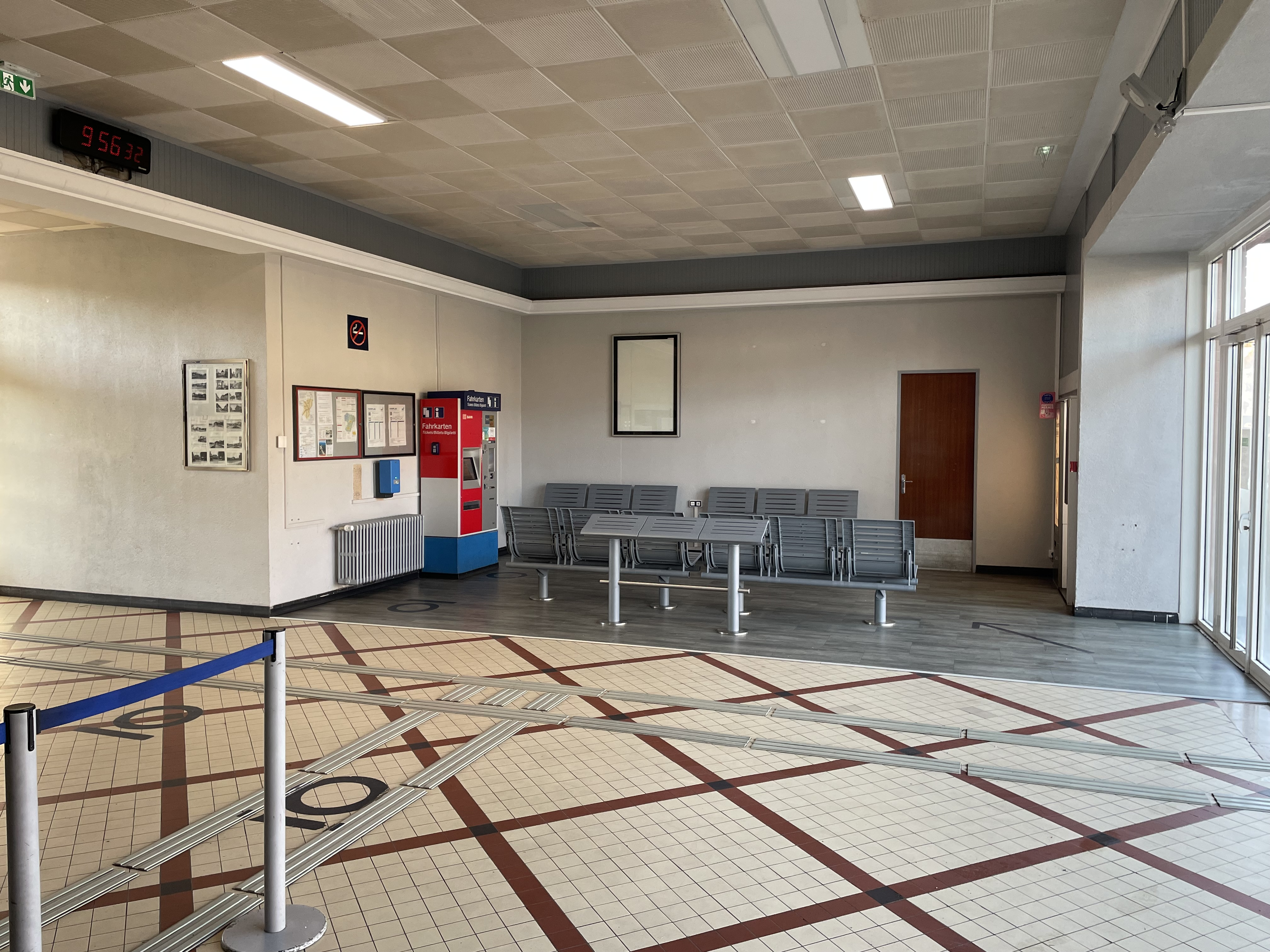
German ticket machine in the arrival hall

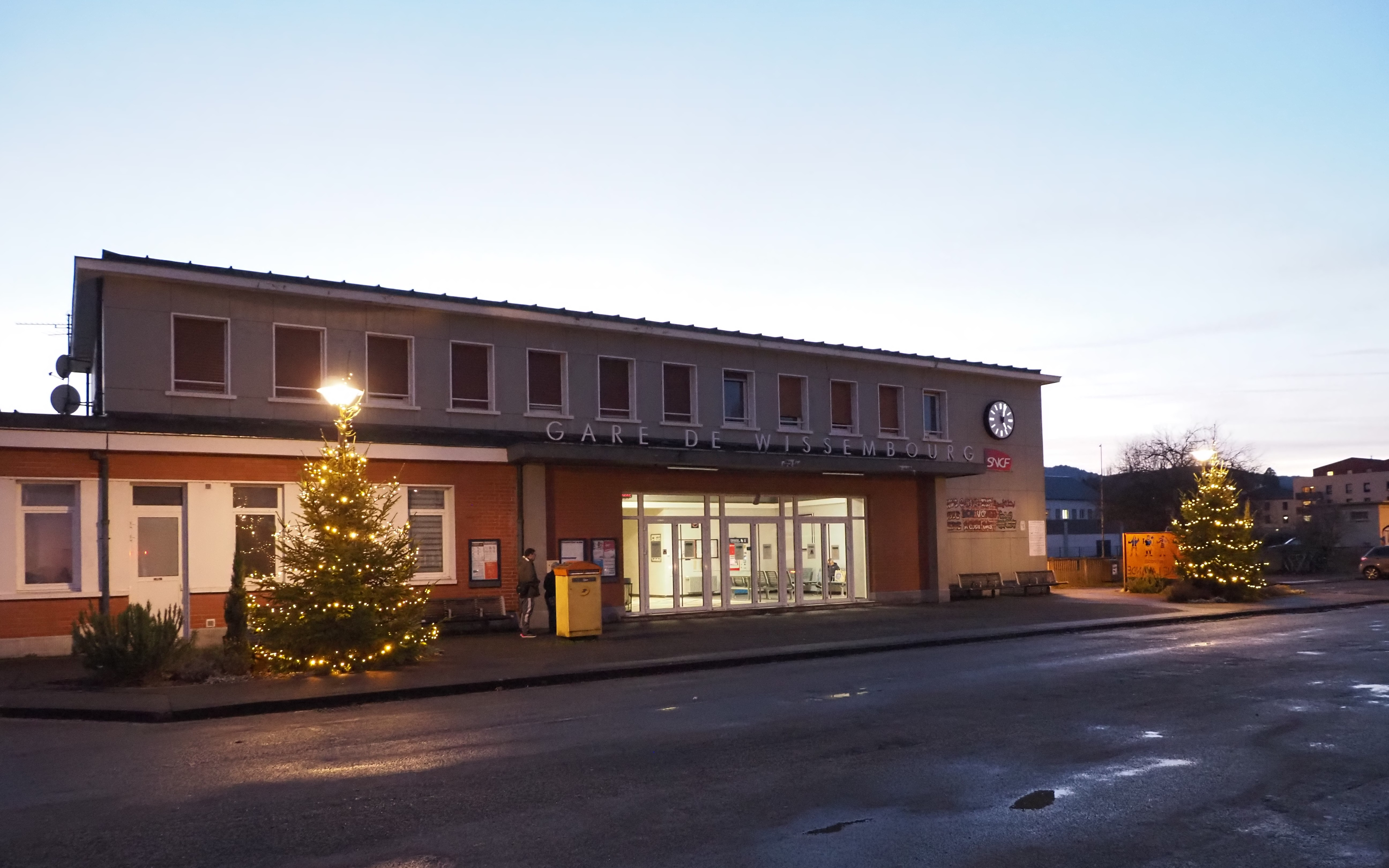
Front side of the station, december 2025

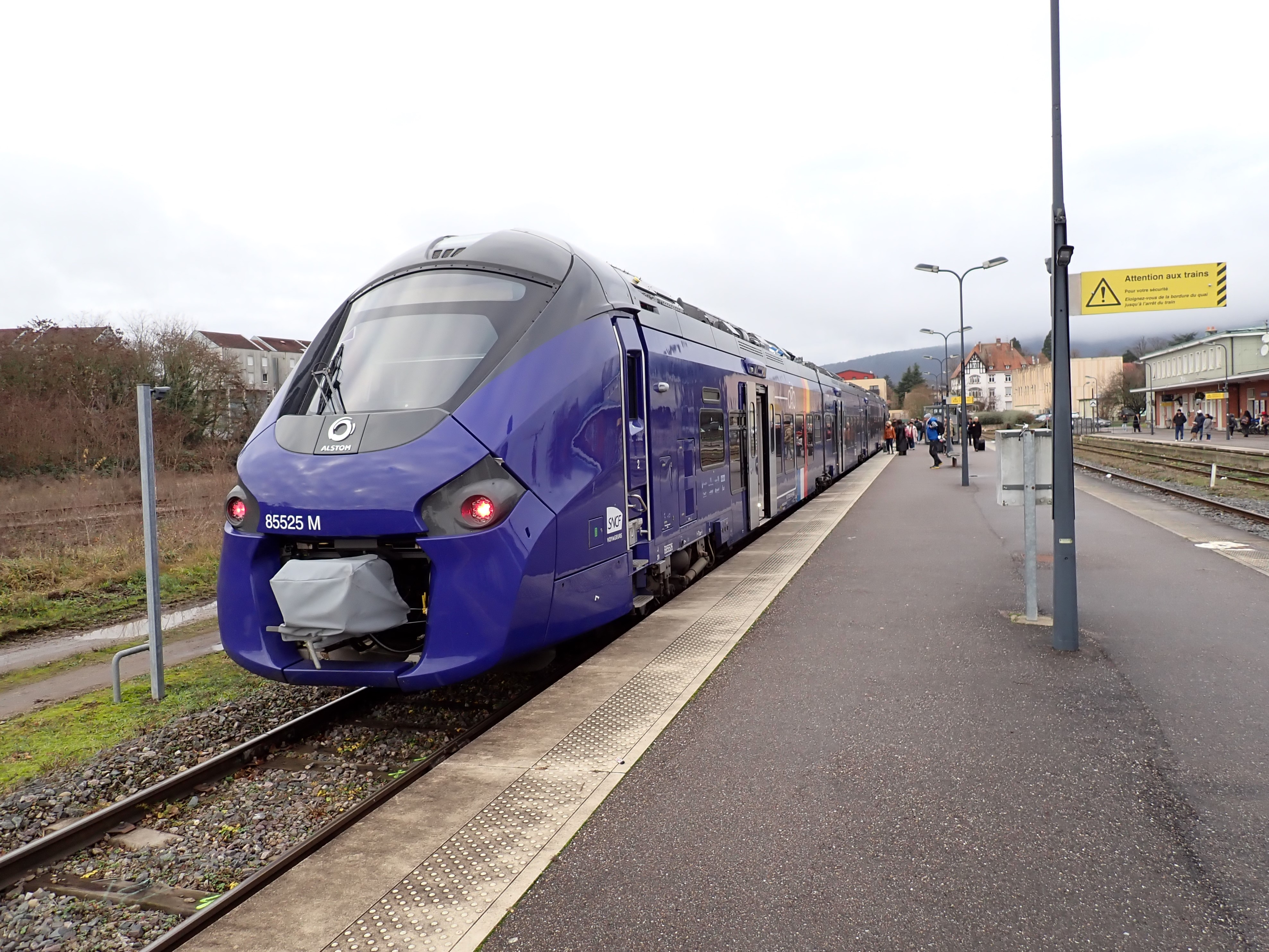
Platform at Gare de Wissembourg

| Preceding station | TER Grand Est | Following station |
|---|---|---|
| Terminus | A34 | Riedseltz towards Strasbourg |
| Preceding station | DB Regio Mitte | Following station |
| Schweighofen towards Neustadt (Weinstraße) Hbf | RB 53 | Terminus |
