= TER Grand Est =

Regional rail network in northeastern France

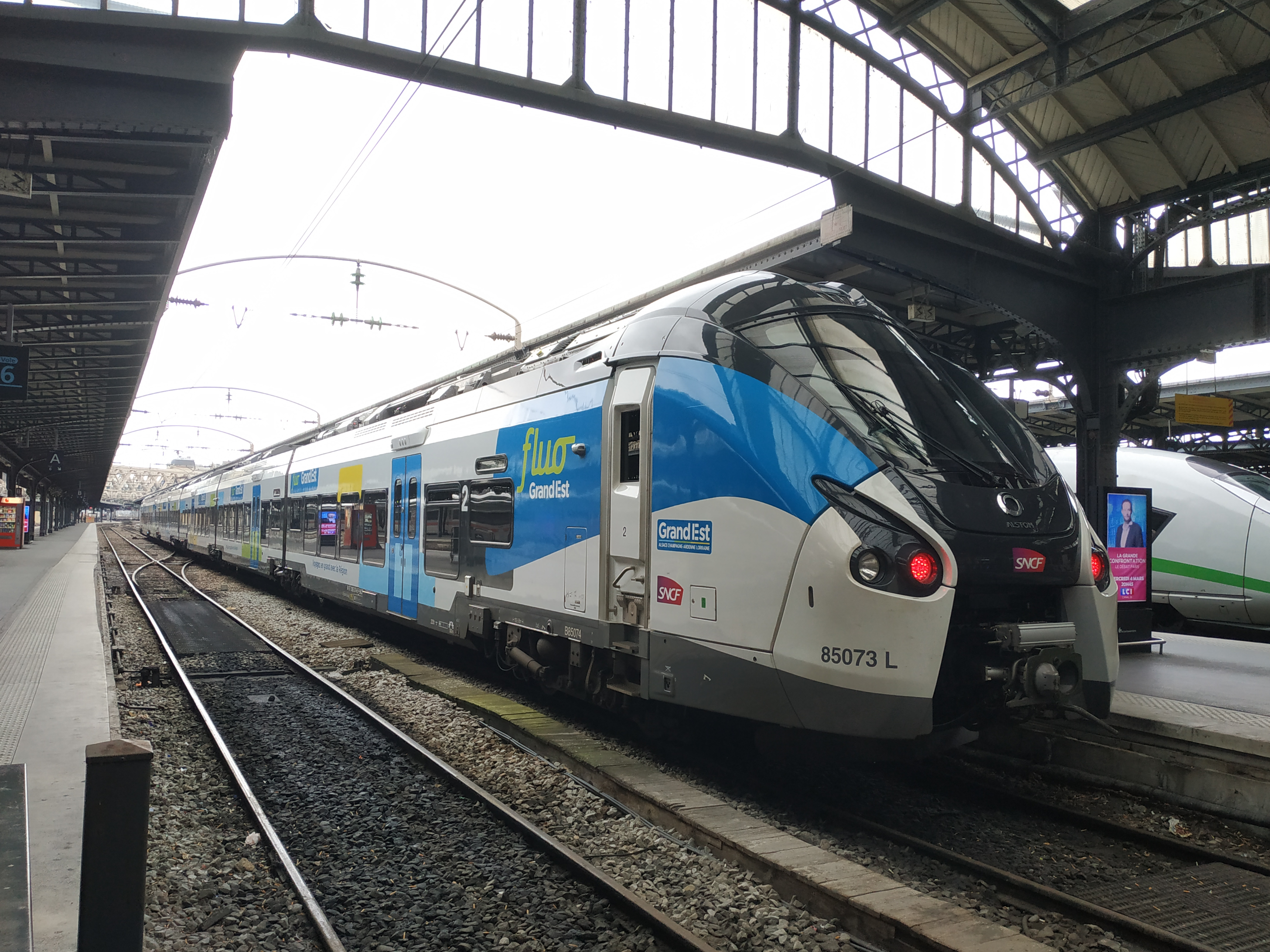
- Régiolis in "Fluo Grand Est" livery at Paris-Est.

Overview
- Owner: SNCF
- Area served: Grand Est, France
- Number of stations: 396
- Daily ridership: 170 000
- Website: https://www.ter.sncf.com/grand-est

Operation
- Began operation: 11 December 2016
- Operator: SNCF

TER Grand Est, operating under the brand TER Fluo, is the regional rail network serving the region of Grand Est, northeastern France. It is operated by the French national railway company SNCF on behalf of the region. It was formed in 2016 from the previous TER networks TER Alsace, TER Lorraine and TER Champagne-Ardenne, when the respective regions were merged.

== History ==
On 1 January 2016, the three administrative regions of Alsace, Lorraine and Champagne-Ardenne merged. As a result, on 11 December 2016, TER Grand Est was created out of the three existing systems TER Alsace, TER Lorraine and TER Champagne-Ardenne, including TER 200 and TER Vallée de la Marne.

In spring 2019, TER Grand Est was integrated into the intermodal network Fluo Grand Est. The new branding is used to signify TER train services operated in the region.

After a competitive tender process held in 2024, a subsidiary of Transdev was awarded a 22-year concession to operate services on the Nancy to Contrexéville line, scheduled to commence in 2027 after the line (currently closed to traffic) is reopened after refurbishment. The award marked the end of SNCF’s monopoly on the operation of TER rail services for the Grand Est region.

== Network ==
The rail and bus network as of February 2021:

=== Rail ===
Rail transport infrastructure map of Grand Est, showing main stations, number of tracks, power source and maximum speed.

List of railway routes
Line	Route
	Alsace
A01	Strasbourg ↔ Mulhouse ↔ (Switzerland) Basel SBB/SNCF (Note: Operated by TER 200.)
A02a	Strasbourg ↔ Erstein ↔ Sélestat ↔ Colmar ↔ (Mulhouse)
A02b	(Strasbourg) ↔ Colmar ↔ Bollwiller ↔ Mulhouse
A03	Strasbourg ↔ Saverne ↔ Sarrebourg
A04	Strasbourg ↔ Haguenau
A05	Strasbourg ↔ Haguenau ↔ Niederbronn
A06	Strasbourg ↔ Sarreguemines ↔ (Germany) Saarbrücken (=L18)
A07	Strasbourg ↔ Molsheim ↔ Obernai ↔ Barr ↔ Sélestat
A08	Strasbourg ↔ Molsheim ↔ Rothau ↔ Saales ↔ Saint-Dié-des-Vosges ↔ Épinal
A09	Strasbourg ↔ Lauterbourg ↔ (Germany) Wörth am Rhein (Note: Mainly operated by DB trains between Lauterbourg and Wörth.)
A10	Lauterbourg ↔ (Germany) Wörth am Rhein (Note: Operated by DB.)
A11	Strasbourg ↔ (Germany) Kehl ↔ (Germany) Offenburg (Note: Also operated by OSB.)
A13	Strasbourg ↔ Nancy (=L20)
A14	Strasbourg ↔ Saverne ↔ Metz (=L19)
A15	Mulhouse ↔ Saint-Louis ↔ (Switzerland) Basel SBB/SNCF
A16	Mulhouse ↔ Belfort
A17	Mulhouse ↔ Thann ↔ Kruth (Note: Including Mulhouse Vallée de la Thur tram-train.)
A18	Strasbourg ↔ Entzheim-Aéroport ↔ Molsheim
A19	Colmar ↔ Munster ↔ Metzeral
A31	Mulhouse ↔ (Germany) Müllheim ↔ (Germany) Freiburg (Note: Connecting services operated by DB between Müllheim an Freiburg-im-Brisgau.)
A34	Strasbourg ↔ Haguenau ↔ Wissembourg ↔ (Germany) Neustadt an der Weinstraße (Note: Operated by DB between Wissembourg and Neustadt an der Weinstraße.)
	Champagne-Ardenne
C01	Sedan ↔ Charleville-Mézières ↔ Reims ↔ Champagne-Ardenne TGV
C02	Strasbourg ↔ Nancy ↔ Bar-le-Duc / Saint-Dizier ↔ Châlons-en-Champagne ↔ Paris-Est (Note: Operated by TER Vallée de la Marne between Bar-le-Duc / Saint-Dizier and Paris-Est, including Château-Thierry station, part of TER Hauts-de-Francenetwork.)
C04	Mulhouse ↔ Belfort / Dijon ↔ Culmont-Chalindrey ↔ Chaumont ↔ Troyes ↔ Paris-Est (Note: Belfort, Lure, Vesoul, Dijon and Is-sur-Tille are also part of TER Bourgogne-Franche-Comté network.)
C05	Charleville-Mézières ↔ Hirson ↔ (Lille-Flandres (Note: See TER Hauts-de-France line K61.))
C06	Reims ↔ Châlons-en-Champagne ↔ Saint-Dizier ↔ Chaumont ↔ Culmont - Chalindrey ↔ Dijon (Note: Operated by TER Bourgogne-Franche-Comté between Is-sur-Tille and Dijon.)
C07	Charleville-Mézières ↔ Givet
C08	Charleville-Mézières ↔ Sedan ↔ Longuyon ↔ Longwy (=L26)
C09	Reims ↔ Champagne-Ardenne TGV / Épernay
C10	Reims ↔ Laon
C11	Reims ↔ Fismes
	Lorraine
L01a	Nancy ↔ Pont-à-Mousson ↔ Pagny-sur-Moselle ↔ Metz
L01b	Metz ↔ Hagondange ↔ Thionville ↔ Bettembourg ↔ Luxembourg-Ville (Note: Also operated by CFL, between Bettembourg and Luxembourg.)
L02	Metz ↔ Thionville ↔ Apach↔ (Germany) Perl ↔ (Germany) Trier (Note: Mainly operated by DB between Perl and Trier (Trèves).)
L04	Nancy ↔ Épinal ↔ Remiremont
L05	Épinal ↔ Lure↔ Belfort (Note: Operated by TER Bourgogne-Franche-Comté.)
L06a	Nancy ↔ Pont-Saint-Vincent
L07	Nancy ↔ Toul ↔ Neufchâteau ↔ Culmont - Chalindrey ↔ Dijon
L11	Nancy ↔ Lunéville ↔ Saint-Dié-des-Vosges
L12	Nancy ↔ Blainville - Damelevières ↔ Lunéville
L15	Metz ↔ Béning ↔ Forbach ↔ (Germany) Saarbrücken
L16	Metz ↔ Béning ↔ Sarreguemines
L18	Strasbourg ↔ Sarreguemines ↔ (Germany) Saarbrücken (=A06)
L19	Strasbourg ↔ Saverne ↔ Metz (=A14)
L20	Strasbourg ↔ Nancy (=A13)
L25	Nancy ↔ Conflans - Jarny ↔ Longwy
L26	Charleville-Mézières ↔ Sedan ↔ Longuyon ↔ Longwy (=C08)
L27	Thionville ↔ Longuyon ↔ Longwy
L28	Metz ↔ Bar-le-Duc ↔ Épernay
L29a	Nancy ↔ Toul ↔ Bar-le-Duc ↔ Reims / Paris-Est
L30	Metz ↔ Hagondange / Onville ↔ Conflans - Jarny ↔ Verdun
L31	Sarreguemines ↔ (Germany) Saarbrücken (Note: Operated by Saarbahn tram-train.)

=== Bus ===
List of bus lines
Line	Route
	Alsace
A20	Sélestat ↔ Sainte-Marie-aux-Mines ↔ Saint-Dié-des-Vosges
A23	Sélestat ↔ Ribeauvillé ↔ (Riquewihr)
A25	Saverne ↔ Frohmuhl
A26	Haguenau ↔ Obermodern ↔ Saverne
A28	Ingwiller↔ Wimmenau ↔ Lichtenberg
A29	Mommenheim ↔ Ettendorf ↔ Bouxwiller
A30	Cernay↔ Sewen
A36	Diemeringen↔ Sarre-Union ↔ Sarralbe
A104	Strasbourg ↔ Haguenau
A107	Strasbourg ↔ Molsheim ↔ Obernai ↔ Barr ↔ Sélestat
A108	Strasbourg ↔ Molsheim ↔ Rothau ↔ Saales
A109	Strasbourg ↔ Lauterbourg
A115	Mulhouse ↔ Saint-Louis ↔ Basel SBB/SNCF
A117	Mulhouse ↔ Thann↔ Kruth
A119	Colmar ↔ Munster ↔ Metzeral
A134	Strasbourg ↔ Haguenau ↔ Wissembourg
	Champagne-Ardenne
C12	Saint-Dizier ↔ Chaumont
C13a	Troyes ↔ Romilly-sur-Seine
C13b	Romilly-sur-Seine ↔ Nogent-sur-Seine
C14	Troyes ↔ Chaumont
C15	Chaumont ↔ Langres
C16	Châlons-en-Champagne ↔ Verdun
C19	Sedan ↔ Carignan ↔ La Ferté-sur-Chiers
C20	Troyes ↔ Saint-Florentin - Vergigny ↔ Laroche - Migennes
C22	Ville-sous-la-Ferté ↔ Clairvaux ↔ Chaumont
C106	Vitry-le-François ↔ Saint-Dizier
	Lorraine
L03	Thionville ↔ Bouzonville ↔ Creutzwald
L06c	Nancy ↔ Vézelise ↔ Mirecourt ↔ Vittel ↔ Contrexéville ↔ Damblain
L06d	( Nancy) ↔ Charmes ↔ Mirecourt↔ Vittel
L08	Remiremont↔ Bussang
L09	Remiremont ↔ La Bresse
L10	Épinal ↔ Mirecourt↔ Vittel↔ Contrexéville↔ Neufchâteau
L13	Épinal↔ Saint-Dié-des-Vosges
L14	Lunéville ↔ Rambervillers ↔ ( Bruyères)
L17	Sarreguemines ↔ Sarralbe↔ Sarre-Union ↔ Sarrebourg
L21a	Rémilly ↔ Morhange
L21b	Morhange↔ Sarrebourg
L21c	Sarrebourg ↔ Lutzelbourg
L22	Igney - Avricourt↔ Nouvel-Avricourt ↔ Sarrebourg
L101a	Nancy↔ Pont-à-Mousson ↔ Pagny-sur-Moselle ↔ Metz
L107	Toul↔ Allamps
L125	Metz ↔ Longwy
L126	Longuyon ↔ Montmédy
L130	Pagny-sur-Moselle ↔ Onville ↔ Conflans - Jarny

== See also ==
- Réseau Ferré de France
- List of SNCF stations in Grand Est
