= Chalindrey =

- Commune
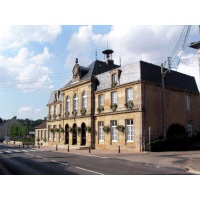
- The town hall in Chalindrey

- Coat of arms
- Location of Chalindrey
- Location within France Location within Grand Est
- Coordinates: 47°48′13″N 5°25′42″E
- Country: France
- Region: Grand Est
- Department: Haute-Marne
- Arrondissement: Langres
- Canton: Chalindrey
- Intercommunality: CC des Savoir-Faire

Government
  - Mayor (2020–2026): Jean-Pierre Garnier
- Area^{1}: 20.03 km^{2} (7.73 sq mi)
- Elevation: 350 m (1,150 ft)
- Highest elevation: 471 m (1,545 ft)
- Lowest elevation: 274 m (899 ft)
- Population (2023): 2,353
  - Density: 117.5/km^{2} (304.3/sq mi)
- Time zone: UTC+01:00 (CET)
  - Summer (DST): UTC+02:00 (CEST)
- INSEE/Postal code: 52093 /52600
- ^{1} French Land Register data, which excludes lakes, ponds, glaciers > 1 km^{2} (0.386 sq mi or 247 acres) and river estuaries.

Chalindrey (French pronunciation: [ʃalɛ̃dʁɛ]) is a commune in the Haute-Marne department in north-eastern France. Culmont-Chalindrey station is an important railway junction.

== Population ==
Historical population
Year	Pop.	±% p.a.
1968	3,495	—
1975	3,383	−0.46%
1982	3,149	−1.02%
1990	2,824	−1.35%
1999	2,699	−0.50%
2007	2,706	+0.03%
2012	2,503	−1.55%
2017	2,407	−0.78%
2023	2,353	−0.38%
Source: INSEE

== See also ==
- Communes of the Haute-Marne department
