= Culmont–Chalindrey station =

Railway station in Haute-Marne, France

Culmont–Chalindrey
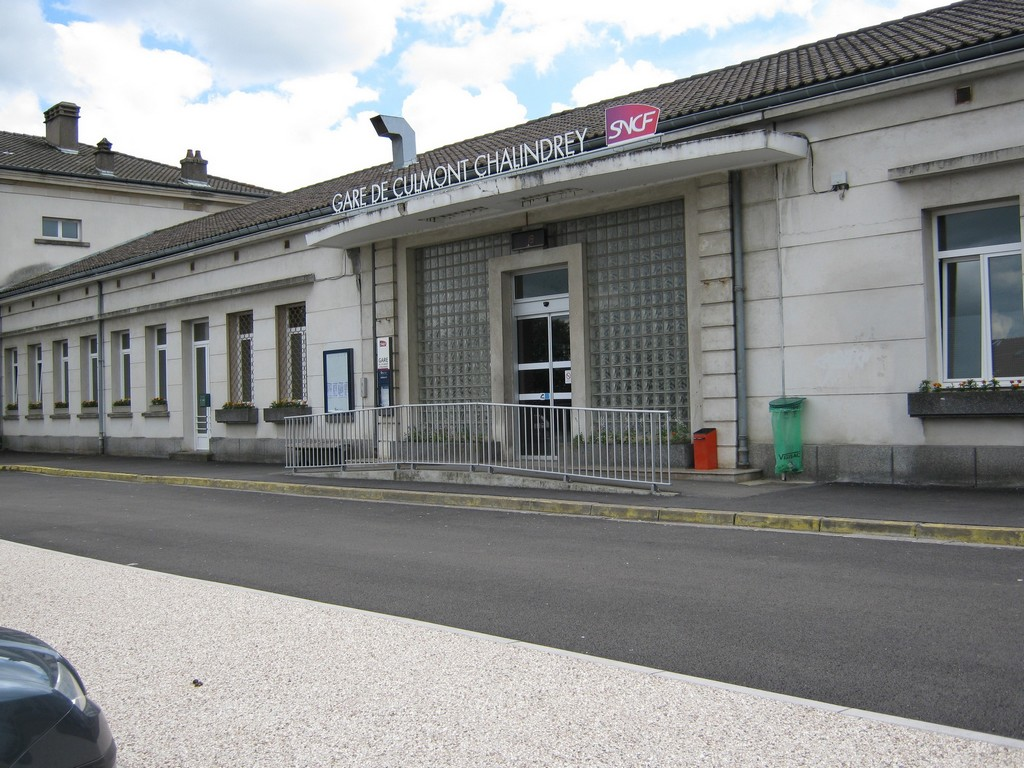

General information
- Location: Rue de la Gare; 52600 Chalindrey; Haute-Marne, France
- Coordinates: 47°48′36″N 5°26′36″E
- Elevation: 332 m (1,089 ft)
- Owner: SNCF
- Operator: SNCF
- Lines: Paris–Mulhouse railway Is-sur-Tille–Culmont–Chalindrey railway Culmont–Chalindrey–Toul railway
- Platforms: 3
- Tracks: 5

History
- Opened: 22 February 1858

Passengers
- 2018: 64,635

Services
Preceding station	TER Grand Est	Following station
Langres towards Paris-Est	C04	Vesoul towards Mulhouse
Langres towards Paris-Est	C04	Is-sur-Tille towards Dijon
Langres towards Reims	C06	Is-sur-Tille towards Dijon
Neufchâteau towards Nancy	L07	Is-sur-Tille towards Dijon
Location

Culmont–Chalindrey station (French: Gare de Culmont–Chalindrey) is a railway station serving the small towns Culmont and Chalindrey, Haute-Marne department, eastern France. It is an important railway junction, situated on the Paris–Mulhouse railway, the Is-sur-Tille–Culmont–Chalindrey railway (toward Dijon) and the Culmont–Chalindrey–Toul railway (toward Nancy).

The station is served by regional trains towards Paris, Reims, Nancy, Mulhouse and Dijon.

== See also ==
- List of SNCF stations in Grand Est
