= Vendeuvre =

- Commune
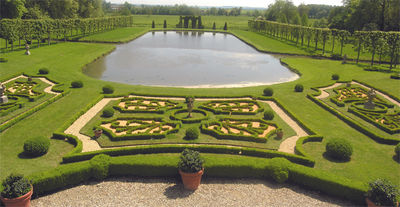
- Gardens of the Chateau of Vendeuvre
- Location of Vendeuvre
- Location within France Location within Normandy
- Coordinates: 48°59′31″N 0°04′27″W
- Country: France
- Region: Normandy
- Department: Calvados
- Arrondissement: Caen
- Canton: Livarot-Pays-d'Auge
- Intercommunality: Pays de Falaise

Government
  - Mayor (2020–2026): Daniel Haghebaert
- Area^{1}: 26.31 km^{2} (10.16 sq mi)
- Elevation: 36 m (118 ft)
- Highest elevation: 86 m (282 ft)
- Lowest elevation: 25 m (82 ft)
- Population (2023): 800
  - Density: 30/km^{2} (79/sq mi)
- Time zone: UTC+01:00 (CET)
  - Summer (DST): UTC+02:00 (CEST)
- INSEE/Postal code: 14735 /14170
- ^{1} French Land Register data, which excludes lakes, ponds, glaciers > 1 km^{2} (0.386 sq mi or 247 acres) and river estuaries.

Vendeuvre (French pronunciation: [vɑ̃dœvʁ]) is a commune in the Calvados department in the Normandy region in northwestern France.

== Geography ==
The commune is made up of the following collection of villages and hamlets, Favières, Pont and Vendeuvre.

Two rivers The Dives and The Perrières are the watercourses that run through the commune. Le Douit du Houle stream also runs through the commune.

== Population ==
Historical population
Year	Pop.	±% p.a.
1968	809	—
1975	721	−1.63%
1982	706	−0.30%
1990	708	+0.04%
1999	734	+0.40%
2007	736	+0.03%
2012	707	−0.80%
2017	774	+1.83%
2023	800	+0.55%
Source: INSEE

== Points of Interest ==
=== National heritage sites ===
The commune has five sites listed as a Monument historique.

- Château de Vendeuvre - an eighteenth century Chateau and gardens listed as a monument in 1970. It is open to the public and features a Miniature furniture museum.
- Château de Grisy - a sixteenth century chateau listed as a monument in 1953.
- Cross - an eleventh century Wayside cross that was listed as a monument in 1903.
- Église Saint-Brice de Grisy - a twelfth century church listed as a monument in 1928.
- The Vavasseurie-au-Cerf - a sixteenth century farm listed as a monument in 1980.

== See also ==
- Communes of the Calvados department
