= Chaumont station =

French railway station

Coordinates: 48°6′35″N 5°8′4″E

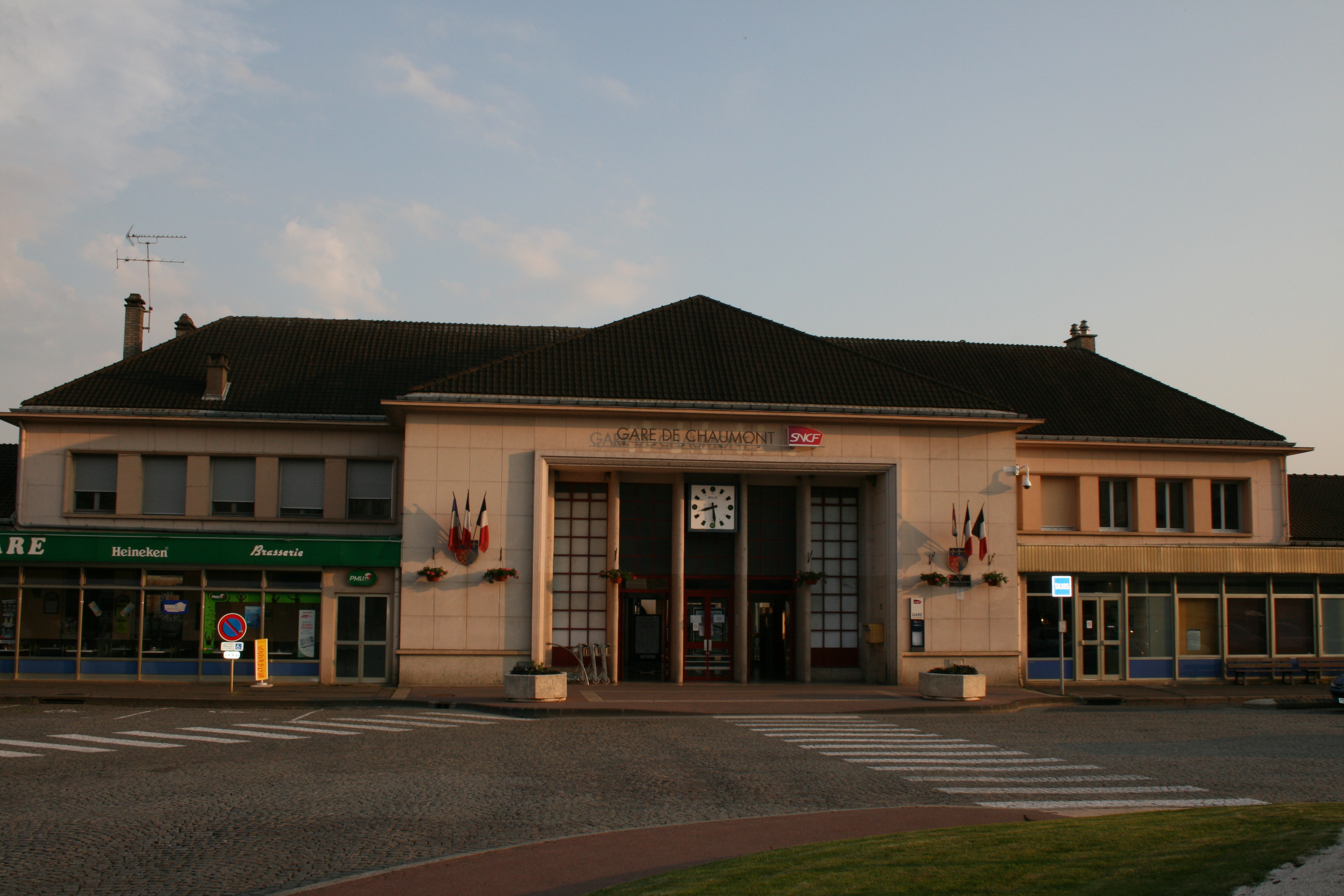
Chaumont station entrance

Chaumont station (French: Gare de Chaumont) is a French railway station serving the town Chaumont, Haute-Marne department, eastern France. It is situated on the Paris–Mulhouse railway. The station is served by regional trains towards Paris, Châlons-en-Champagne, Dijon and Vesoul.

Preceding station	TER Grand Est	Following station
Bar-sur-Aube towards Paris-Est	C04	Langres towards Mulhouse or Dijon
Bologne towards Reims	C06	Langres towards Dijon

== See also ==
- List of SNCF stations in Grand Est
