= Muizon station =

French railway station

Coordinates: 49.2782°N 3.8910°E

Muizon
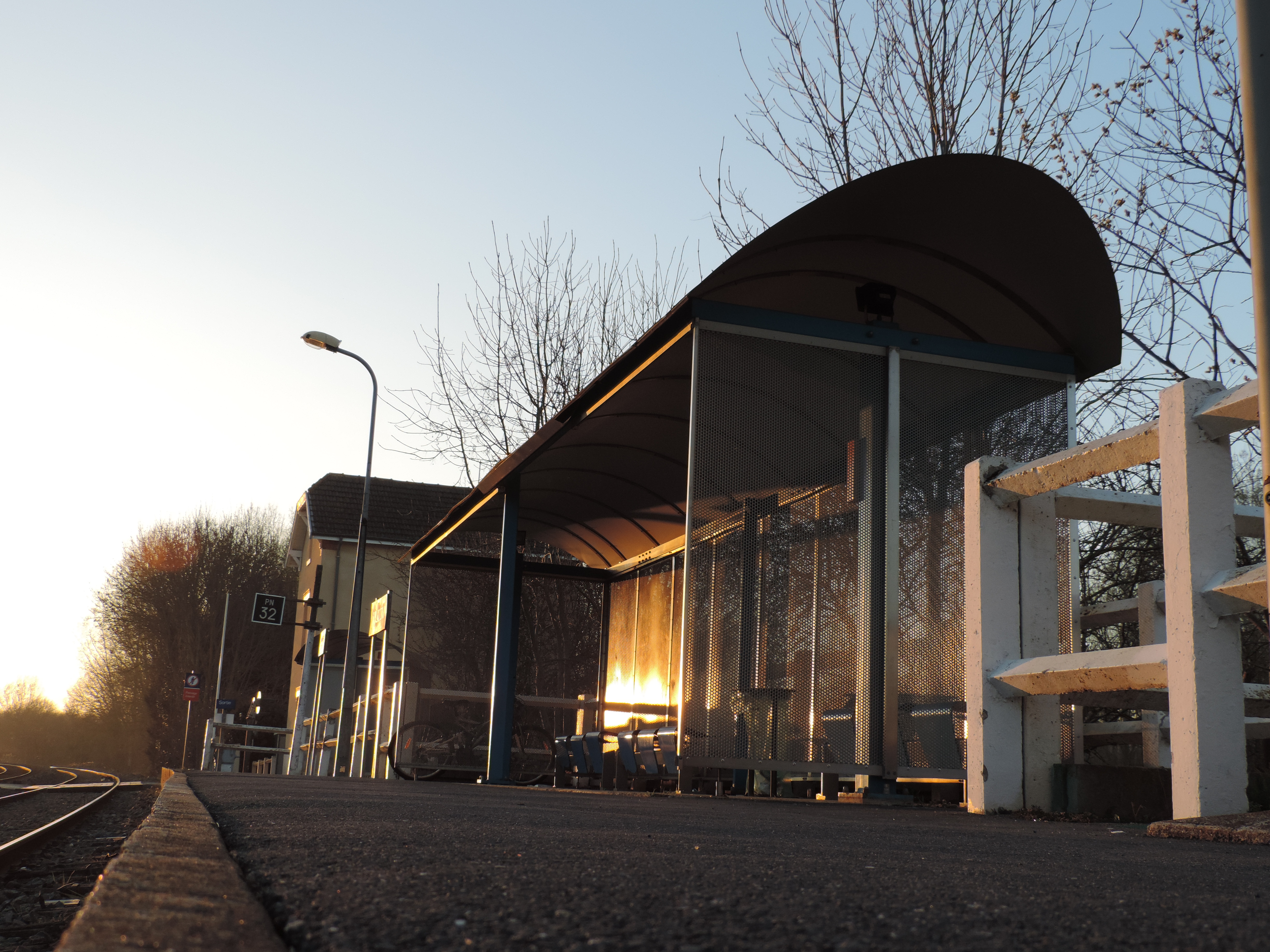

General information
- Location: Route de Trigny; 51140 Muizon; Marne, France
- Elevation: 72 m (236 ft)
- Owner: SNCF
- Operator: SNCF
- Platforms: 2
- Tracks: 2

Other information
- Station code: 87171298

Passengers
- 2018: 65,407

Services
Preceding station	TER Grand Est	Following station
Jonchery-sur-Vesle towards Fismes	C11	Reims Terminus
Location

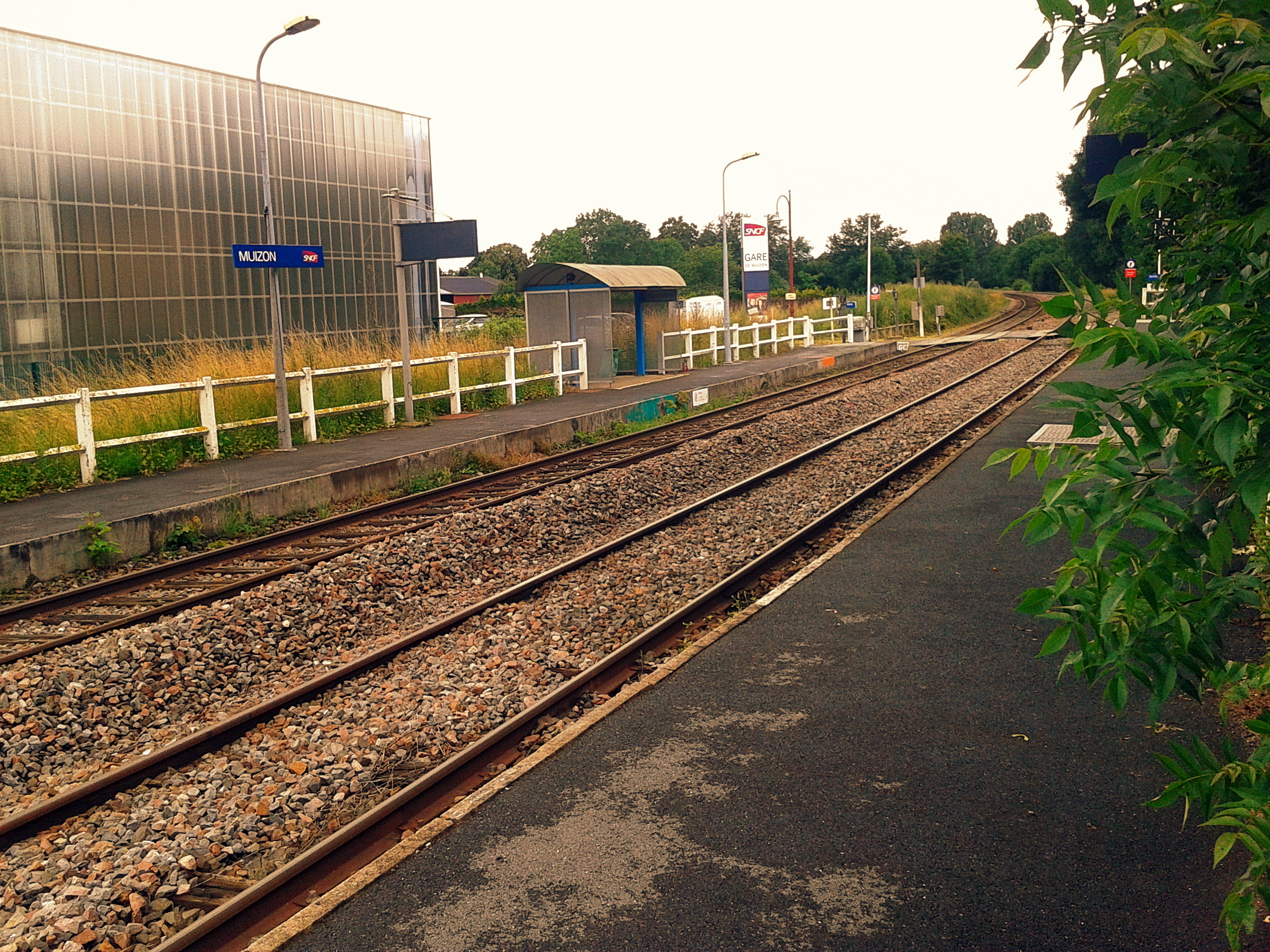
Muizon station

Muizon station (French: Gare de Muizon) is a railway station located in the French municipality of Muizon, in the département of Marne. It is served by TER Grand Est trains between Reims and Fismes (line C11) operated by the SNCF.

== History ==
Muizon station was inaugurated on April 16, 1862 by the Ardennes Railway Company during the commissioning of the Soissons to Reims section of the Soissons to Givet line.

The passenger building dates from the opening of the line and is identical to those at Monthermé and Deville stations.

== See also ==
- List of SNCF stations
