= Jonchery-sur-Vesle station =

French railway station

Coordinates: 49°17′25″N 3°49′10″E

Jonchery-sur-Vesle
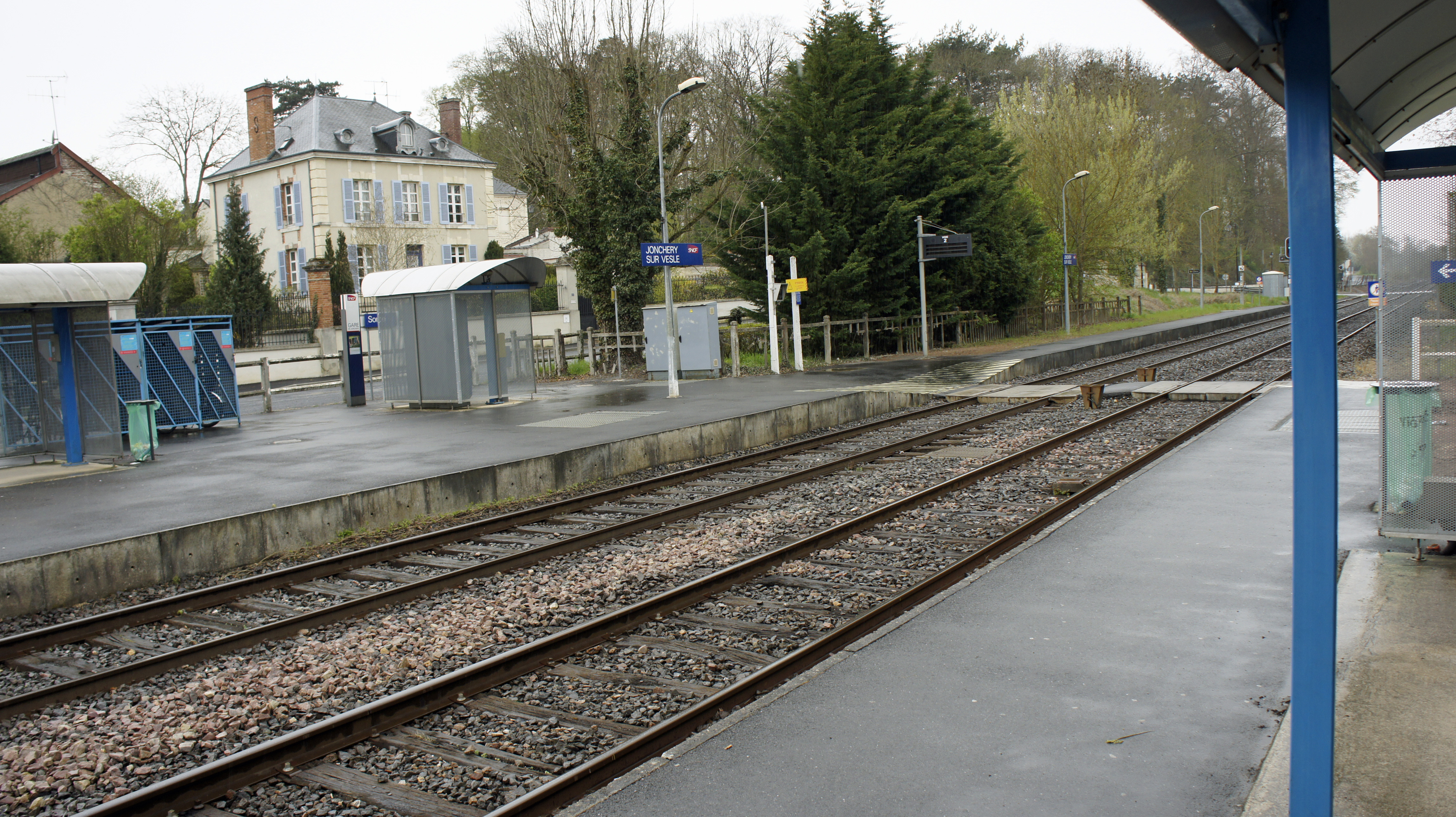

General information
- Location: 54 Place de la gare 51140 Jonchery-sur-Vesle; Marne, France
- Elevation: 71 m (233 ft)
- Owner: SNCF
- Operator: SNCF
- Platforms: 2
- Tracks: 2

Other information
- Station code: 87171314

Passengers
- 2018: 77,268

Services
| Preceding station | TER Grand Est | Following station |
|---|---|---|
| Breuil-Romain towards Fismes | C11 | Muizon towards Reims |
Location

Jonchery-sur-Vesle station (French: Gare de Jonchery-sur-Vesle) is a railway station located in the French municipality of Jonchery-sur-Vesle, in the department of the Marne.

== Services ==
The station is unstaffed and equipped with ticket dispensing machines. It is served by TER Grand Est trains between Reims and Fismes (line C11), operated by the SNCF.
