= Aerial combat of 5 October 1914 =

- Part of First World War
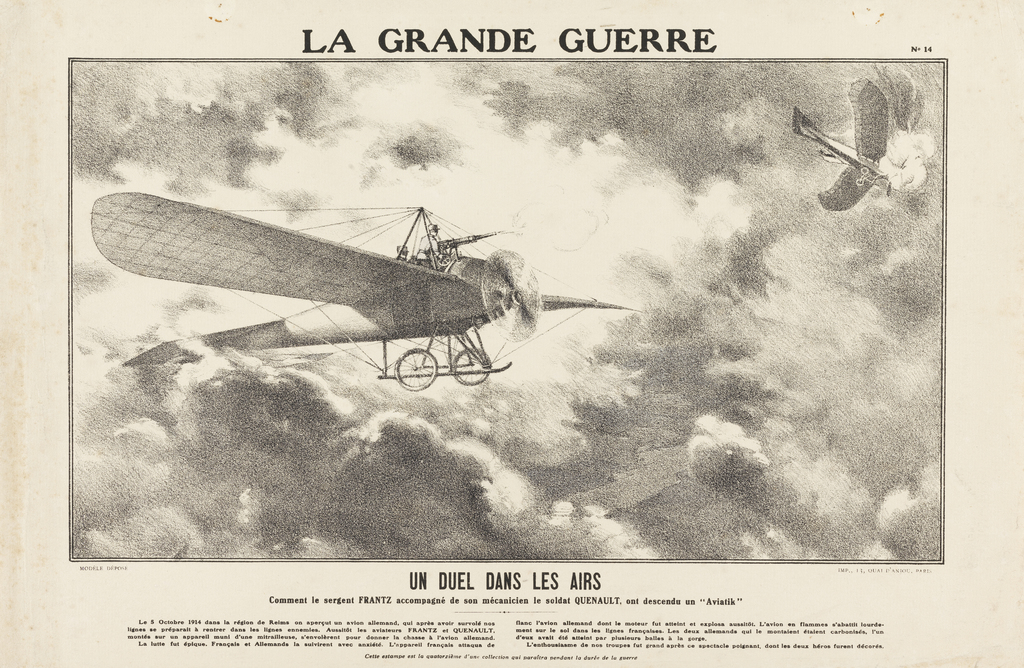
- A Duel in the Air, French print from 1914.
Date	5 October 1914
Location	Reims, France 49.28694°N 3.81556°E
Result	French victory

Belligerents
France	German Empire
Voisin III	Aviatik B.I

The first aerial combat in history that ended in a victory for an air force took place in the region of the city of Reims in France on 5 October 1914, at the start of the First World War. French Corporal Louis Quenault, aboard a Voisin III piloted by Sergeant Joseph Frantz, shot down a German Aviatik.

== Context ==
Military aeronautics was still a new idea at the start of the First World War. Indeed, the airplane itself was a recent invention, since the first flight of the Wright brothers' Flyer only took place in 1903. Progress was rapid and by 1909 France was acquiring aircraft dedicated to military reconnaissance. On 1 November 1911, in Ottoman Tripolitania, during the Italo-Turkish War, Italian aviator Giulio Gavotti was the first to carry out a bombing raid—four hand-thrown grenades. The first aircraft shot down, an Italian Nieuport, was hit by machine gun fire in 1912. Airplanes also saw some limited military use during the Second Balkan War.

At the start of the world conflict, no aerial combat had yet taken place. On 26 August 1914, the Russian aviator Piotr Nesterov deliberately crashed his Morane-Saulnier Type G into an Austro-Hungarian Albatros B.II in the Jovkva region ( Eastern Front), a special manoeuvre called "taran" which led to the destruction of both aircraft and the death of their occupants.

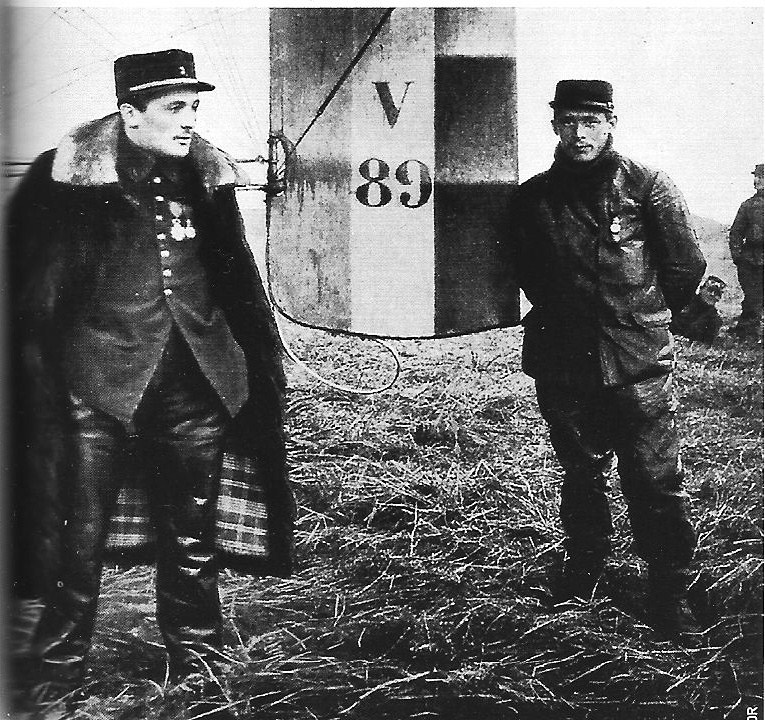
Louis Quenault and Joseph Frantz

Joseph Frantz (born 7 August 1890 in Beaujeu, Rhône), obtained his pilot's license in 1911 and initially worked as a test pilot at Savary while participating in various competitions such as the military competition at Camp de Châlons. In December 1911, he succeeded in the feat of passing between the towers of Chartres Cathedral. He was called up for military service the following year and continued to fly during his leave. On 1 August 1914, he was assigned to squadron V.24 where he was promoted to sergeant on 6 August.

Louis Quenault was born on 2 October 1892 in Paris. He was raised by his cook mother in a modest environment and had an unknown father. He was then recognized at the age of thirteen by Eugène-Léon Quenault, whose name he henceforth bears. He was assigned as an aviation mechanic to Joseph Frantz.

The two men had already engaged in combat in the air eleven times but had never managed to bring down their opponent, due to the paltry firepower of their revolvers.

The German crew consisted of Sergeant Wilhelm Schlichting, who was pilot, and Lieutenant Fritz von Zangen as observer.

== Combat of 5 October ==
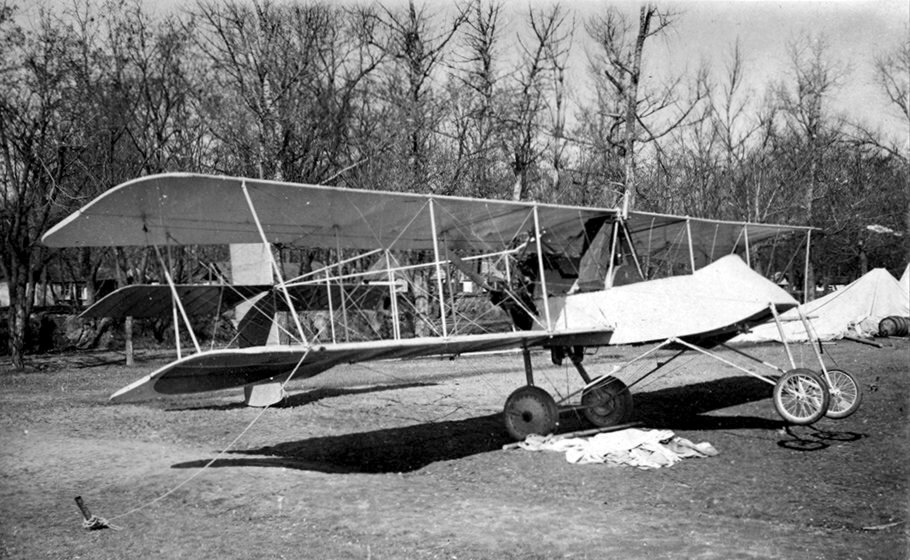
A French Voisin III

On the morning of Monday 5 October 1914, Joseph Frantz and Louis Quenault were tasked with carrying out a bombing operation on the German lines in the Fort de Brimont sector by dropping six 75 or 90mm tailed shells, depending on the source. At Frantz's request, their Voisin III biplane was armed with a Hotchkiss Mle 1914 machine gun. It was the aircraft's own builder, Gabriel Voisin, a friend of Captain André Faure who commanded the squadron, who installed it on a tripod. The idea was strictly private, and the hierarchy had not given its approval. The Voisin III (or Voisin 3) was a recently designed aircraft, since its first flight had only been a few months before. It was a propeller-driven biplane whose light steel structure gave it great robustness.

After Quenault had settled behind him with the shells and the machine gun, Frantz took off the plane around 8 a.m. from the Lhéry airfield and climbed to an altitude of 2,000m. The mission accomplished, he headed towards the Chemin des Dames. As they flew over the French lines, the two men spotted a German Aviatik. This was piloted by Sergeant Wilhelm Schlichting, accompanied by observer lieutenant Fritz von Zangen. The latter was armed with only a simple carbine.

Frantz decided to attack him. His experience, until then unsuccessful, in aerial combat allowed him to know that it was only by approaching as close as possible to the enemy - within 10 meters - that they could shoot him down. Indeed, because of the unreliability of the machine gun which tended to jam, it was necessary to fire shot by shot, which made any attempt at a distance very uncertain.

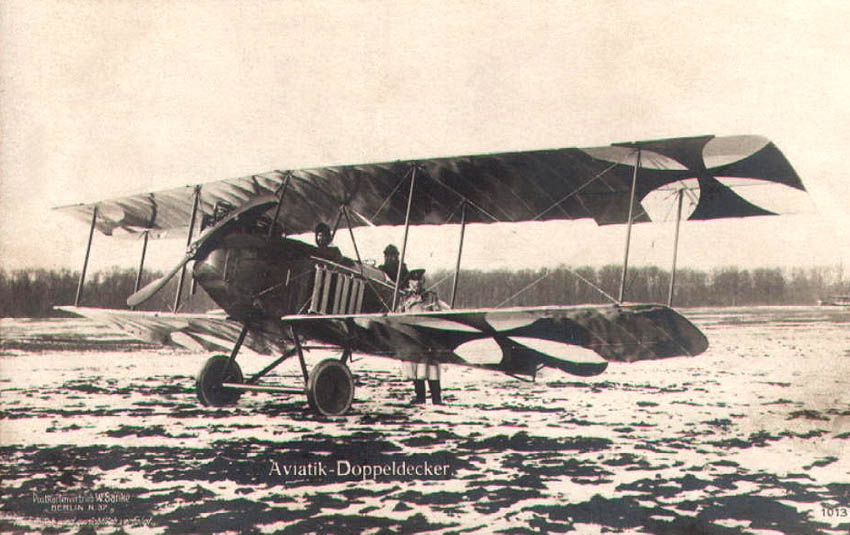
A German Aviatik B.I

Frantz placed his plane behind the Aviatik, slightly above it in order to facilitate the work of his teammate. The latter opened fire and, for a quarter of an hour, fired regularly on his target which tried to escape him by making a wide spiral. After forty-seven bullets fired, the Hotchkiss machine gun jammed and Quenault began to dismantle the breech in order to repair it. At that moment, the German aircraft reared up, fell on its left wing and suddenly dived towards the ground, catching fire. It crashed near Jonchery-sur-Vesle, Marne) in front of General Louis Franchet d'Espèrey and many soldiers of the 5th Army attracted by the spectacle.

The general had the bodies of the German airmen buried with military honors.

== Consequences ==
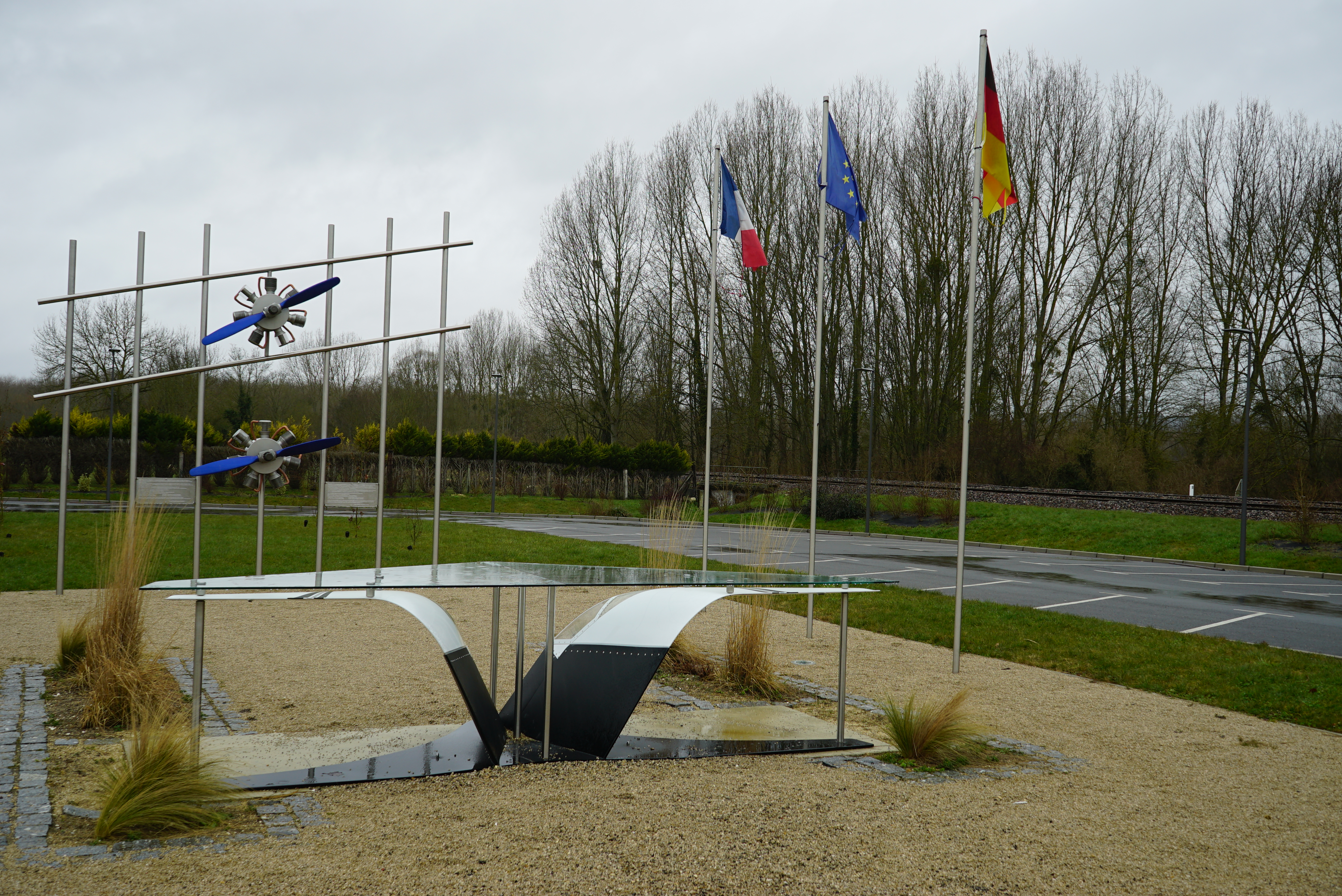
The memorial of the event in Muizon.

This battle was the first aerial victory in history. For this feat of arms, Louis Quenault received the Military Medal and Joseph Frantz, already the holder of this decoration, was made a knight of the Legion of Honour.

This first certified victory confirmed the usefulness of arming aircraft and rekindled the interest of the French general staff in developing machine gun systems, while some officers wanted to concentrate efforts on bombing.

Several of the major newspapers of the time, such as Le Figaro on 8 October and Le Temps the following day, reported the event. The published press release, however, contains an error because it states that the two aviators only took off after spotting the Aviatik over French lines, with the aim of giving chase.

A centenary ceremony was held on 5 October 2014 in Jonchery-sur-Vesle during which a commemorative plaque was installed in the presence of the descendants of Joseph Frantz. An exhibition at the Air and Space Museum in Le Bourget dedicated to the aviators of the Great War was inaugurated on the same day.

== See also ==
=== Internal links ===
- Aviation in World War I
- Lists of World War I flying aces, a "Flying ace" is an airman who has achieved at least five aerial victories.

=== External links ===
- (Vidéo) Témoignage de Joseph Frantz enregistré en novembre 1965, sur europeana.eu.
