= Breuil-Romain station =

Railway station in Breuil, France

Coordinates: 49°18′30″N 3°46′00″E

Breuil-Romain
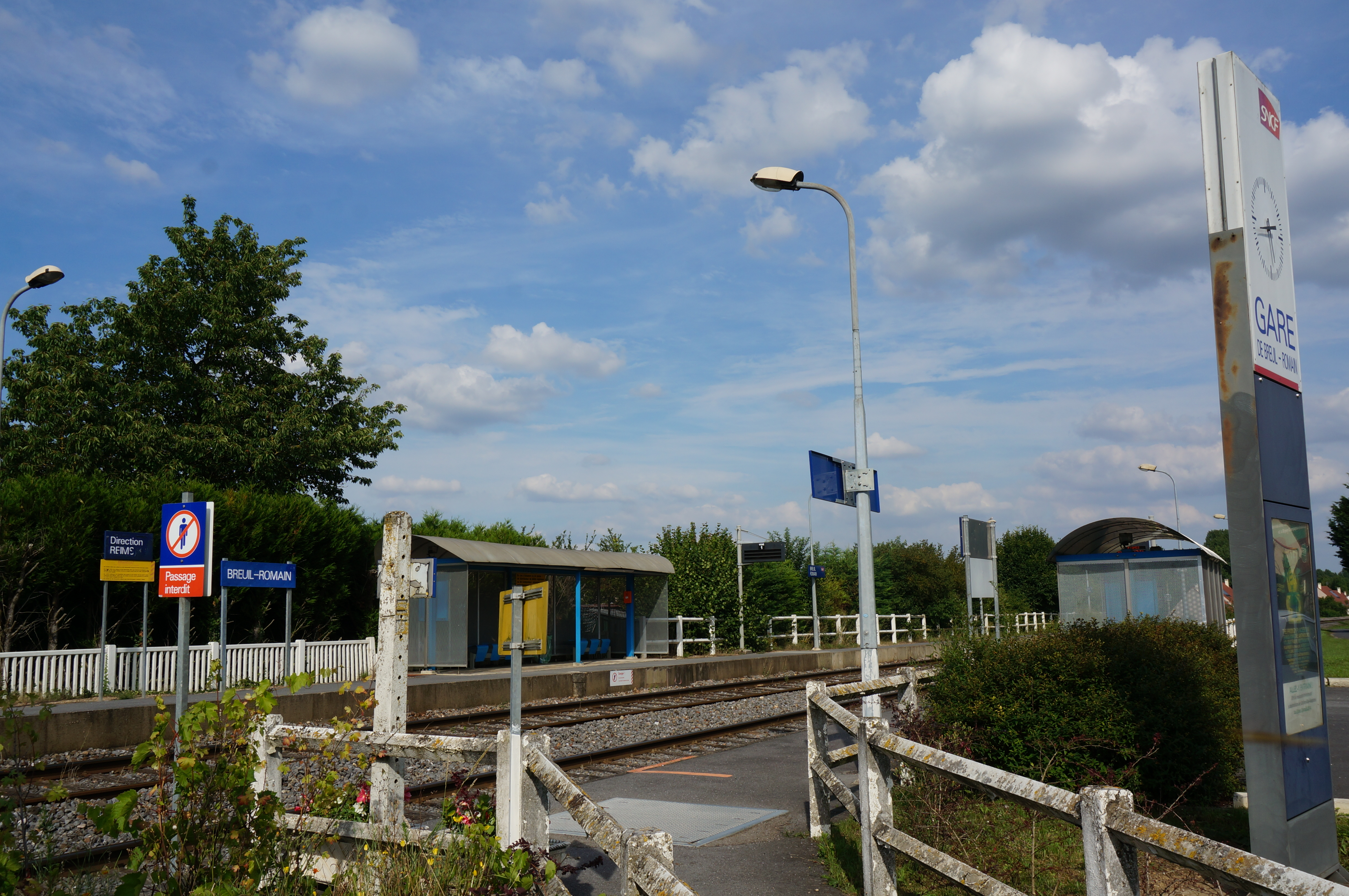

General information
- Location: La Briqueterie; 51140 Breuil-sur-Vesle; Marne, France
- Elevation: 71 m (233 ft)
- Owner: SNCF
- Operator: SNCF
- Platforms: 2
- Tracks: 2

Other information
- Station code: 87171322

Passengers
- 2018: 13 976

Services
Preceding station	TER Grand Est	Following station
Magneux–Courlandon towards Fismes	C11	Jonchery-sur-Vesle towards Reims
Location

Breuil-Romain is a railway station located in the French municipality of Breuil-sur-Vesle, in the département of Marne.

== Services ==
The station is served by TER Grand Est trains between Reims and Fismes (line C11) operated by the SNCF.
