= Ardre =

Ardre may refer to:

- Ardre (river), a fifth order river in France
- Ardre, Gotland, a settlement in Sweden
- 10130 Ardre, a main-belt asteroid
- Ardre image stones, a collection of Viking rune and image stones

== See also ==
- Ardres, a commune I France
