= Magneux–Courlandon station =

French railway station

Magneux–Courlandon
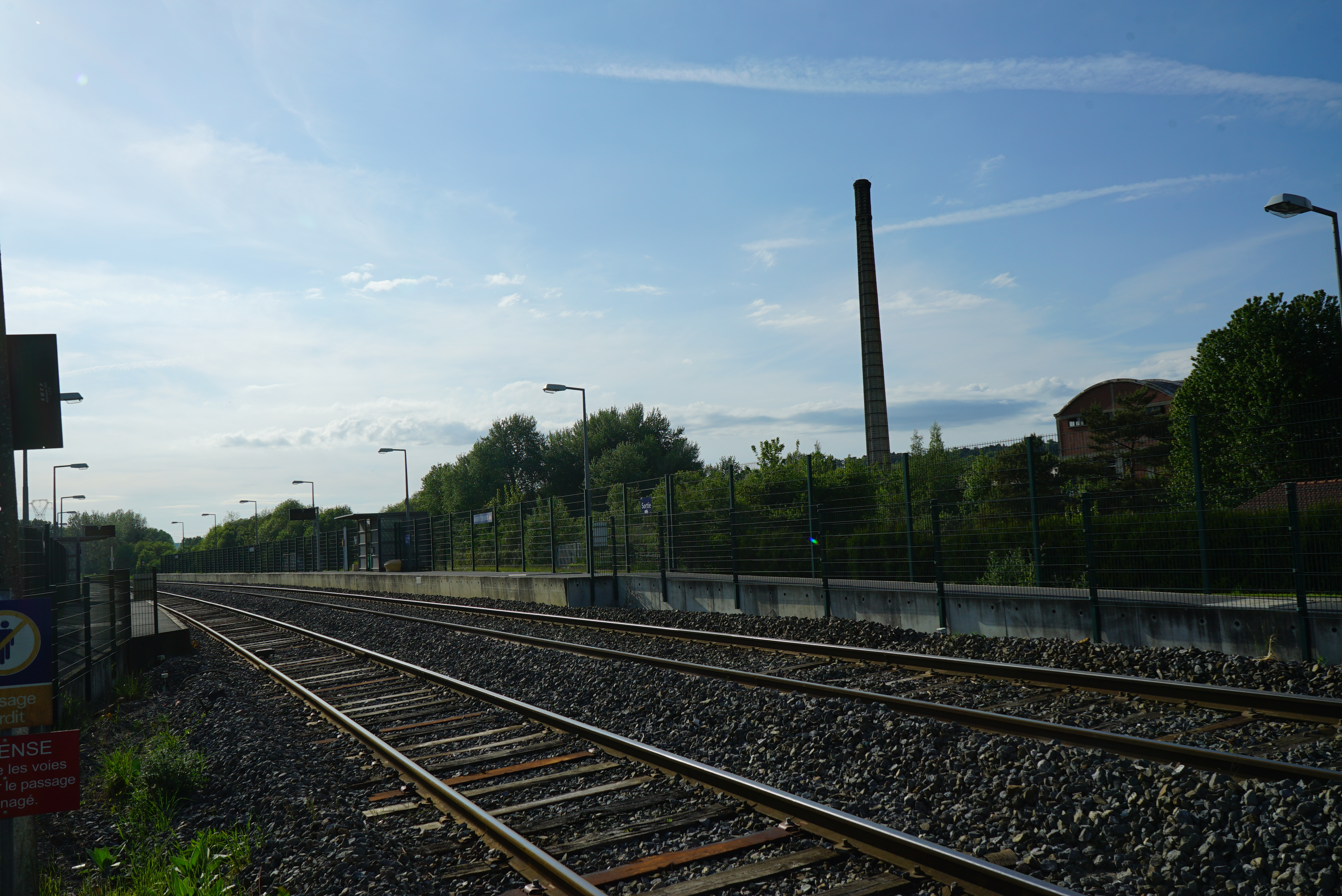

General information
- Location: Route de Courlandon; 51170 Magneux; Marne, France
- Coordinates: 49.3100°N 3.7332°E
- Elevation: 68 m (223 ft)
- Owner: SNCF
- Operator: SNCF
- Platforms: 2
- Tracks: 2

Other information
- Station code: 87400986

Passengers
- 2018: 17 563

Services
| Preceding station | TER Grand Est | Following station |
|---|---|---|
| Fismes Terminus | C11 | Breuil-Romain towards Reims |
Location

Magneux–Courlandon station (French: Gare de Magneux–Courlandon) is a railway station located in the French municipality of Magneux, in the department of Marne.

In 2018 the SNCF estimated that 17,563 passengers travelled through the station.

== Services ==
The station is served by TER Grand Est trains between Reims and Fismes (line C11) operated by the SNCF.
