= Battle of Fismes and Fismette =

1918 WWI battle in France

Coordinates: 49°18′28″N 03°40′53″E

- Part of World War I
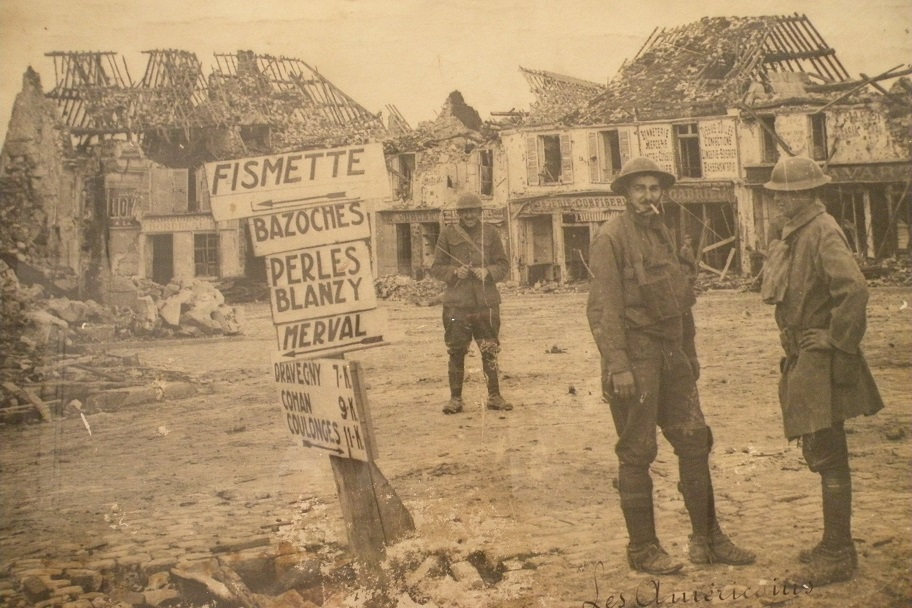
- American troops in Fismes around September 14, 1918.
Date	August 3, 1918 — September 1, 1918
Location	Fismes, Marne, France
Result	Allied Victory

Belligerents
United States; France	Germany

Commanders and leaders
R. Bruce Campbell; Fredrick L. Pond	Unknown

Units involved
32nd Infantry Division	7th Army

Casualties and losses
(United States) :2,068 killed 13,718 wounded (France) :Unknown	Unknown

The Battle of Fismes and Fismette was a battle in Fismes, France, that took place during the First World War from 3 August to 1 September 1918 after the end of the Second Battle of the Ourcq and the Aisne-Marne Offensive.

== Location ==
Fismes is a small commune in the Marne department in the Champagne-Ardennes region of northeastern France. It is crossed by the Vesle River and linked to the hamlet of Fismette by a memorial bridge that commemorates the sacrifices made by the soldiers of the 28th Infantry Division ("Keystone") who fought to liberate the region during the First World War.

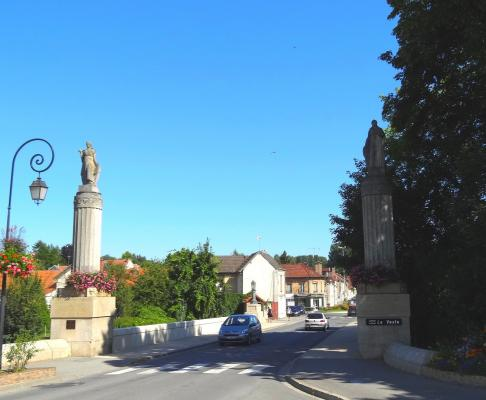
Memorial bridge honoring fallen soldiers of the 28th Division in Fismes

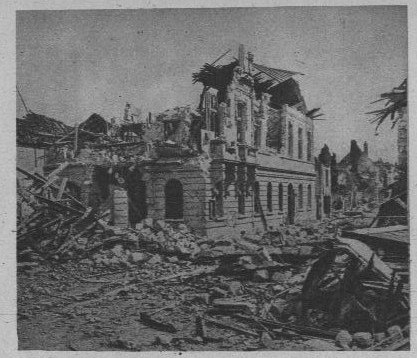
The town hall was destroyed during the course of the war.

== Battle ==
The Second Battle of the Marne was the last major German attack on the Western Front during World War I. The purpose of the attack had been to end the conflict, and Erich Ludendorff, Chief Quartermaster General, believed that an attack conducted through Flanders would give Germany the final victory that it needed. In order to hide his true intentions, Ludendorff set up a large diversionary attack along the Marne.

The Germans failed to break through the Allied line, and on July 20 they were ordered to retreat. By July 22, the 7th Army (German: 7 Armee Oberkommando) had established a new line from the upper Ourcq to Marfaux but were forced to retreat again, settling on the banks of the Vesle on August 3. There they prepared a new defensive position in Aisne.

The banks of the Vesle were the new front: on the north were the German Wichura forces and to the south was the American 3rd Corps, which had relieved the 1st Army Corps.

The two first days of the Battle, the 32nd American Division lost 2,000 men in its efforts to cross the Vesle River and reach Fismes. This Division was relieved by the 28th Infantry Division. For a month, the battle would continue in the areas surrounding Fismes and Fismette.

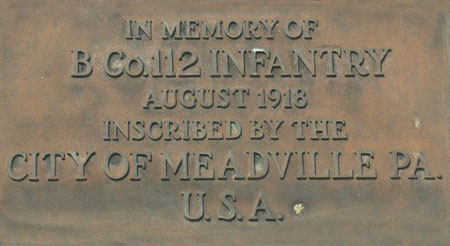
Plaque on the Hotel de Ville honoring the 28th Division.

The Battle of Fismes and Fismette is unique in the history of World War I because of the extreme violence and street fighting that occurred, as well as the presence of storm trooper attacks and flame throwers. All of this culminated in the total destruction of Fismes (around 90%), more than in the neighboring Reims. Over the course of just a month, Fismes would be lost and won again five times by the Allied forces.

In the month of August, the quarter of Fismette was lost and recaptured 5 times by the enemy. At the end of the battle on the two engaged countrysides, Company B, 112th Infantry from Meadville, PA who had 151 members who were assigned to duty in France, lost ten soldiers and 48 injured. The survivors formed a group that would forever be bounded together. This group was called the Last Man Society, formed by Lt. Col. R. Bruce Campbell and Fredrick L. Pond. The name of this group was later changed to the Société de Fismes in 1948 to signify the group’s connection to the City in France. This group was to meet regularly in remembrance of their efforts, and the last man of the club was to drink a bottle of wine which was Barton & Guestier "Royal Purple Burgundy" brought back from France by Lt. Pond. Ignatius Joseph Maggio was the final member of the society. He died on May 12, 1995, at the age of 100. He decided not to open the bottle, instead choosing to leave it unopened. It now resides within the City of Meadville Building sealed and intact.

== Memorial ==
The Fismes Memorial site is located along the Vesle River, near the memorial bridge that was constructed with the help of the State of Pennsylvania. The Battle of Fismes and Fismette that occurred during World War I sparked a lasting friendship between the City of Fismes and the United States, particularly the State of Pennsylvania. The main intentions of this memorial are to commemorate the soldiers' sacrifices and strengthen the ties that exist between Fismes and the United States, specifically the State of Pennsylvania.

The memorial consists of four exterior panels visible to the public. Each panel displays a different representation of Fismes during the First World War and its assistance and liberation by American soldiers in the 28th Infantry Division. The memorial was officially inaugurated on September 15, 2018.
