= Breuil-sur-Vesle =

- Commune
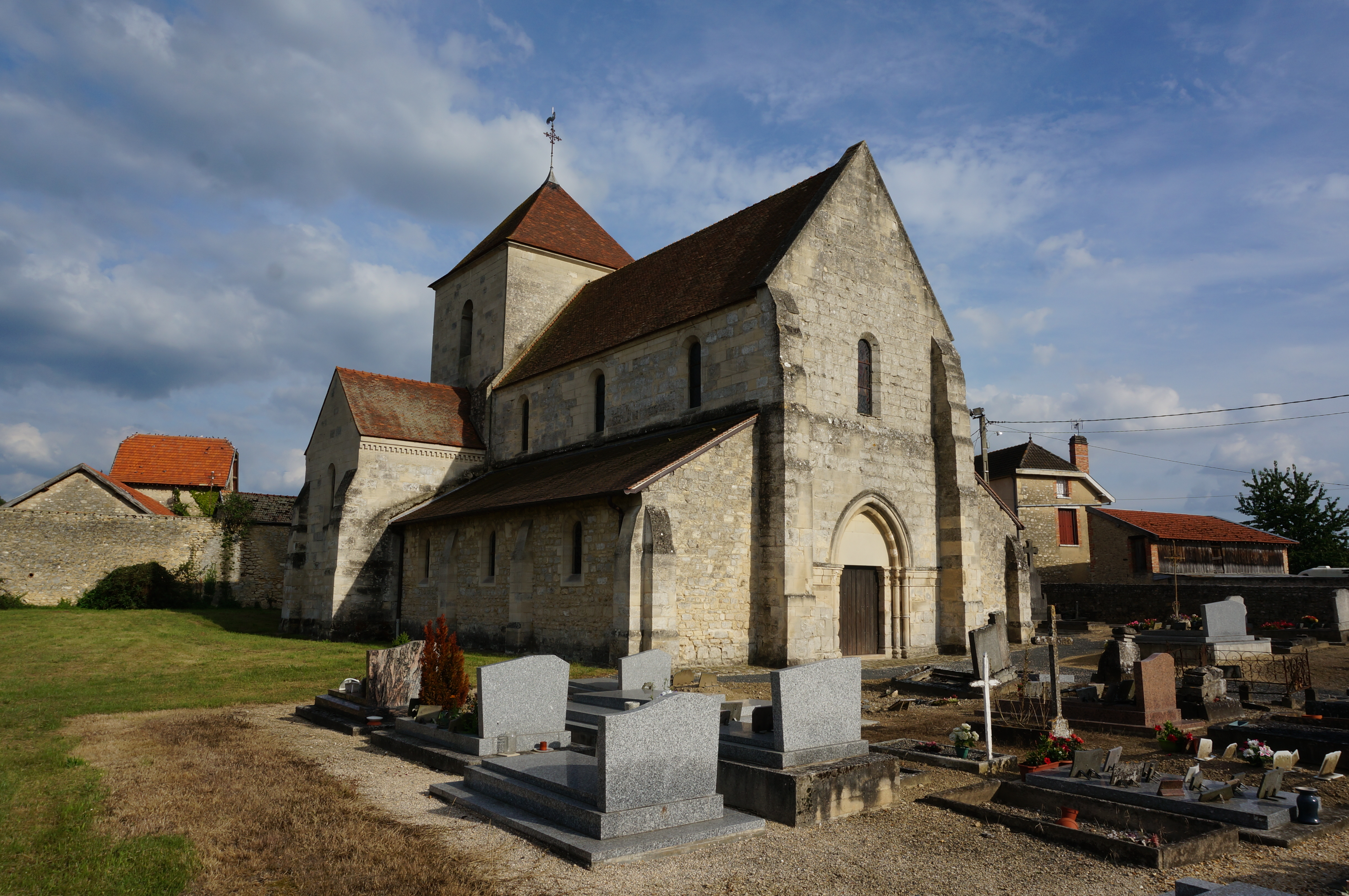
- The church in Breuil-sur-Vesle
- Location of Breuil-sur-Vesle
- Location within France Location within Grand Est
- Coordinates: 49°18′41″N 3°46′03″E
- Country: France
- Region: Grand Est
- Department: Marne
- Arrondissement: Reims
- Canton: Fismes-Montagne de Reims
- Intercommunality: CU Grand Reims

Government
  - Mayor (2020–2026): Bertrand Boilly
- Area^{1}: 6.46 km^{2} (2.49 sq mi)
- Highest elevation: 172 m (564 ft)
- Lowest elevation: 63 m (207 ft)
- Population (2023): 325
  - Density: 50.3/km^{2} (130/sq mi)
- Time zone: UTC+01:00 (CET)
  - Summer (DST): UTC+02:00 (CEST)
- INSEE/Postal code: 51086 /51140
- ^{1} French Land Register data, which excludes lakes, ponds, glaciers > 1 km^{2} (0.386 sq mi or 247 acres) and river estuaries.

Breuil-sur-Vesle (French: Breuil-sur-Vesle, French pronunciation: [bʁœj syʁ vɛl], literally Breuil on Vesle; before 2018: Breuil) is a commune in the Marne department in northeastern France. Breuil-Romain station has rail connections to Reims and Fismes.

== Population ==
Historical population
Year	Pop.	±% p.a.
1968	245	—
1975	164	−5.57%
1982	152	−1.08%
1990	182	+2.28%
1999	230	+2.63%
2007	292	+3.03%
2012	342	+3.21%
2017	342	+0.00%
2023	325	−0.85%
Source: INSEE

== See also ==
- Communes of the Marne department
