= Magneux, Marne =

Magneux
- Commune
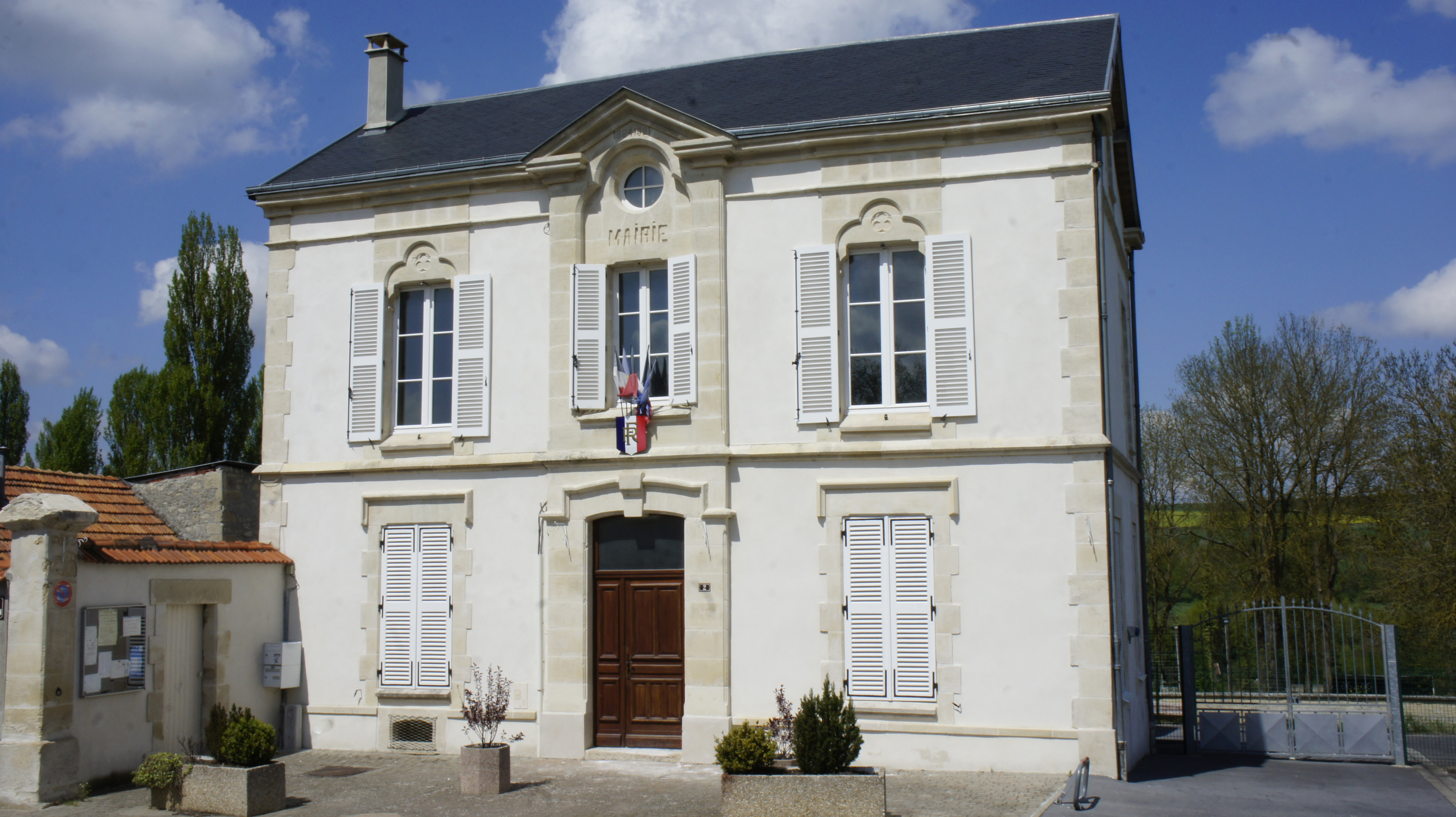
- The town hall in Magneux
- Location of Magneux
- Location within France Location within Grand Est
- Coordinates: 49°18′25″N 3°43′19″E
- Country: France
- Region: Grand Est
- Department: Marne
- Arrondissement: Reims
- Canton: Fismes-Montagne de Reims
- Intercommunality: CU Grand Reims

Government
  - Mayor (2020–2026): Francky Caron
- Area^{1}: 3.19 km^{2} (1.23 sq mi)
- Highest elevation: 182 m (597 ft)
- Lowest elevation: 63 m (207 ft)
- Population (2023): 266
  - Density: 83.4/km^{2} (216/sq mi)
- Time zone: UTC+01:00 (CET)
  - Summer (DST): UTC+02:00 (CEST)
- INSEE/Postal code: 51337 /51170
- ^{1} French Land Register data, which excludes lakes, ponds, glaciers > 1 km^{2} (0.386 sq mi or 247 acres) and river estuaries.

Magneux (French pronunciation: [maɲø]) is a commune in the Marne department in north-eastern France. Magneux-Courlandon station has rail connections to Reims and Fismes.

== See also ==
- Communes of the Marne department
