= Jonchery-sur-Vesle =

- Commune
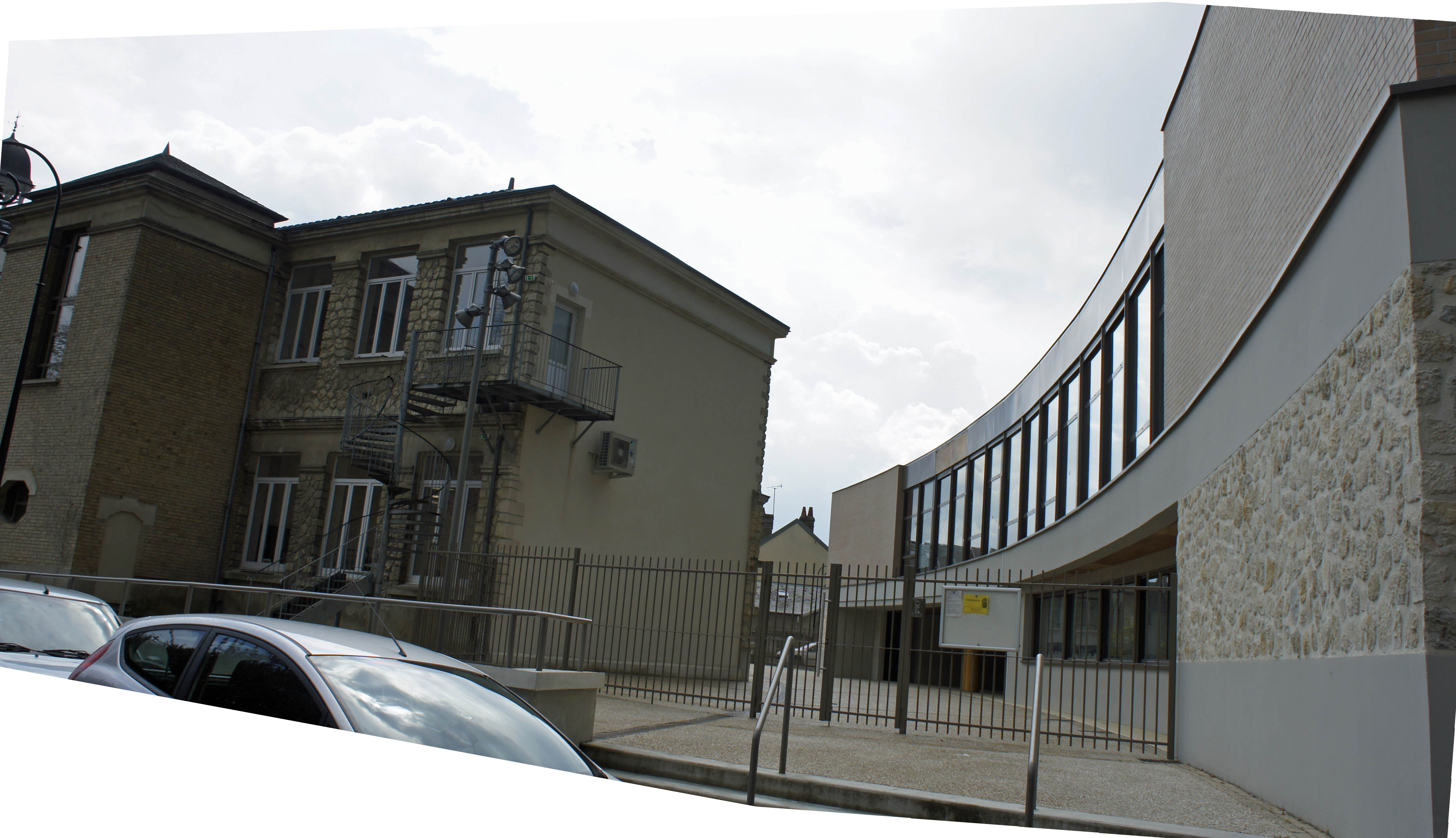
- The town hall in Jonchery-sur-Vesle

- Coat of arms
- Location of Jonchery-sur-Vesle
- Location within France Location within Grand Est
- Coordinates: 49°17′13″N 3°48′56″E
- Country: France
- Region: Grand Est
- Department: Marne
- Arrondissement: Reims
- Canton: Fismes-Montagne de Reims
- Intercommunality: CU Grand Reims

Government
  - Mayor (2020–2026): Nadine Poulain
- Area^{1}: 3.2 km^{2} (1.2 sq mi)
- Highest elevation: 145 m (476 ft)
- Lowest elevation: 65 m (213 ft)
- Population (2023): 1,822
  - Density: 570/km^{2} (1,500/sq mi)
- Demonym: Joncaviduliens
- Time zone: UTC+01:00 (CET)
  - Summer (DST): UTC+02:00 (CEST)
- INSEE/Postal code: 51308 /51140
- ^{1} French Land Register data, which excludes lakes, ponds, glaciers > 1 km^{2} (0.386 sq mi or 247 acres) and river estuaries.

Jonchery-sur-Vesle (French pronunciation: [ʒɔ̃ʃʁi syʁ vɛl], literally Jonchery on Vesle) is a commune in the Marne department in north-eastern France. Jonchery-sur-Vesle station has rail connections to Reims and Fismes.

== See also ==
- Communes of the Marne department
