= Ardre (river) =

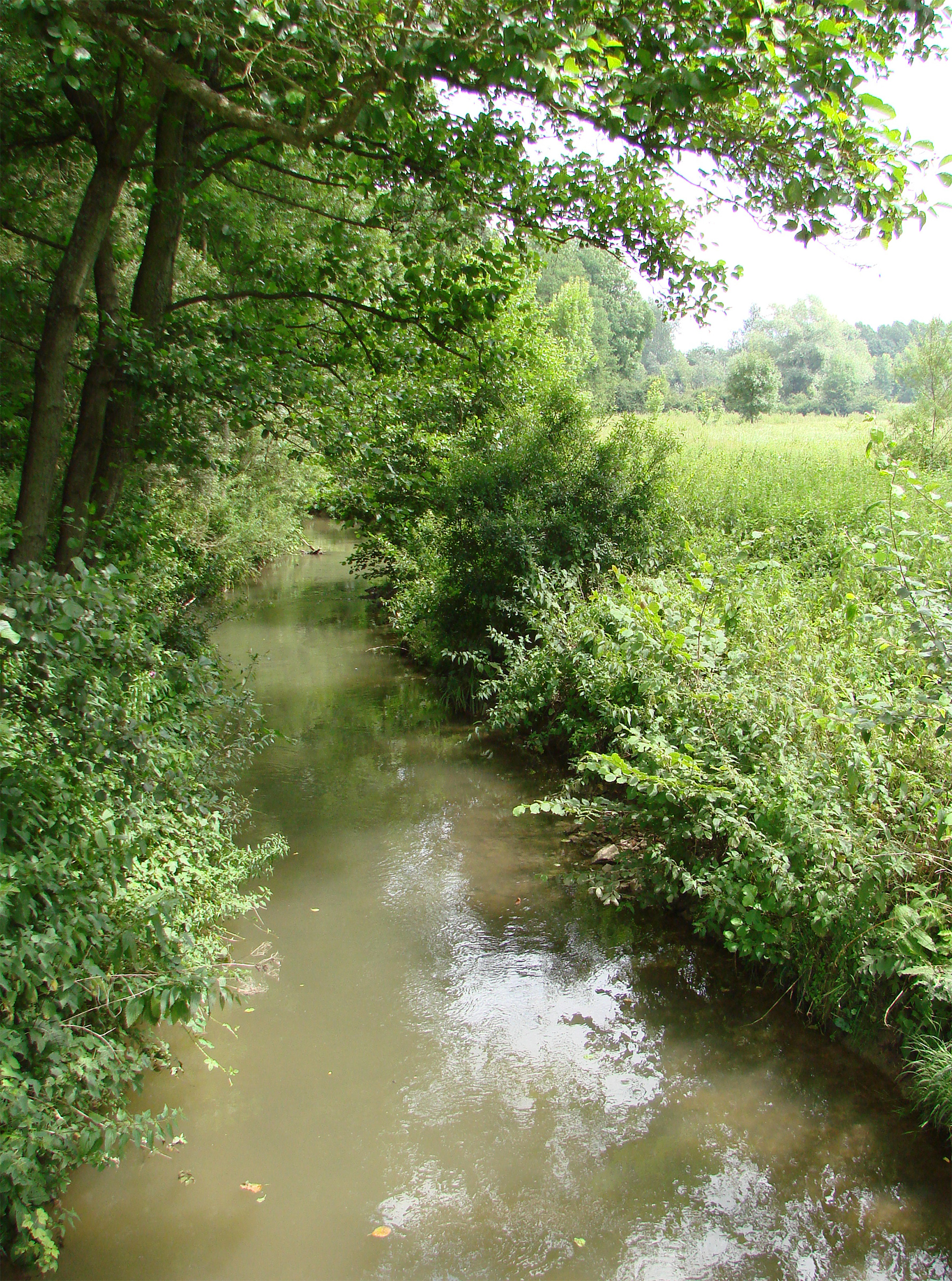
- The Ardre near Faverolles-et-Coémy.

- Location within France Location within Grand Est

Location
- Country: France

Physical characteristics
- Mouth
  - location: At Fismes on the Vesle
  - coordinates: 49°18′30″N 3°39′38″E
- Length: 39 km (24 mi)
- Basin size: 297 km^{2} (115 sq mi)

Basin features
- Progression: Vesle→ Aisne→ Oise→ Seine→ English Channel

The Ardre (French pronunciation: [aʁdʁ]) is a fifth order river in France which flows into the Vesle (left tributary) thence into the Aisne, Oise and Seine. It is 39.3 km (24.4 mi) long.

== Geography ==
The river lies to the west of Reims and flows on bearing of about 310° from the Parc Régional de la Montagne de Reims to enter the Vesle at Fismes.

It rises at an altitude of about 270 m (890 ft) and descends over a course of 39 km (24 mi), to about 80 m (260 ft) in Fismes. It is crossed by the Paris to Reims motorway, A4/E50 about halfway along the river's length.

Its geology is comparable with that of the lower Thames valley and south Hampshire. Though the chalk of the Champagne plateau is not far away, towards Reims, the immediate surroundings are of middle Eocene but the river has cut down into lower Eocene clay deposits like those at Chichester. Consequently, the landscape is much more wooded than that typical of Champagne.

== Hydrology ==
The Ardre's flow was observed during a period of 37 years (1969–2005), at Fismes, in the département of Marne situated at its confluence with the Vesle. The catchment area of the river is 297 km^{2} (115 sq mi).

The mean of the annual flow rates or module, at Fismes over this period was shown to be 1,56 m^{3} per second.

The seasonal fluctuations are small, at least, when compared with the typical French water course. The higher flows occur in the winter to spring period, taking the monthly flow rates to between 1,95 and 2,54 m^{3} per second, from December to April with a slight peak in February. The low flows occur in late summer and early autumn, from July to October. This gives a low in the mean monthly flow rate of 0,68-0,70 m^{3} in August and September.

Mean monthly flow (m^{3}/s) measured at the hydrological station at Fismes – data calculated over 37 years

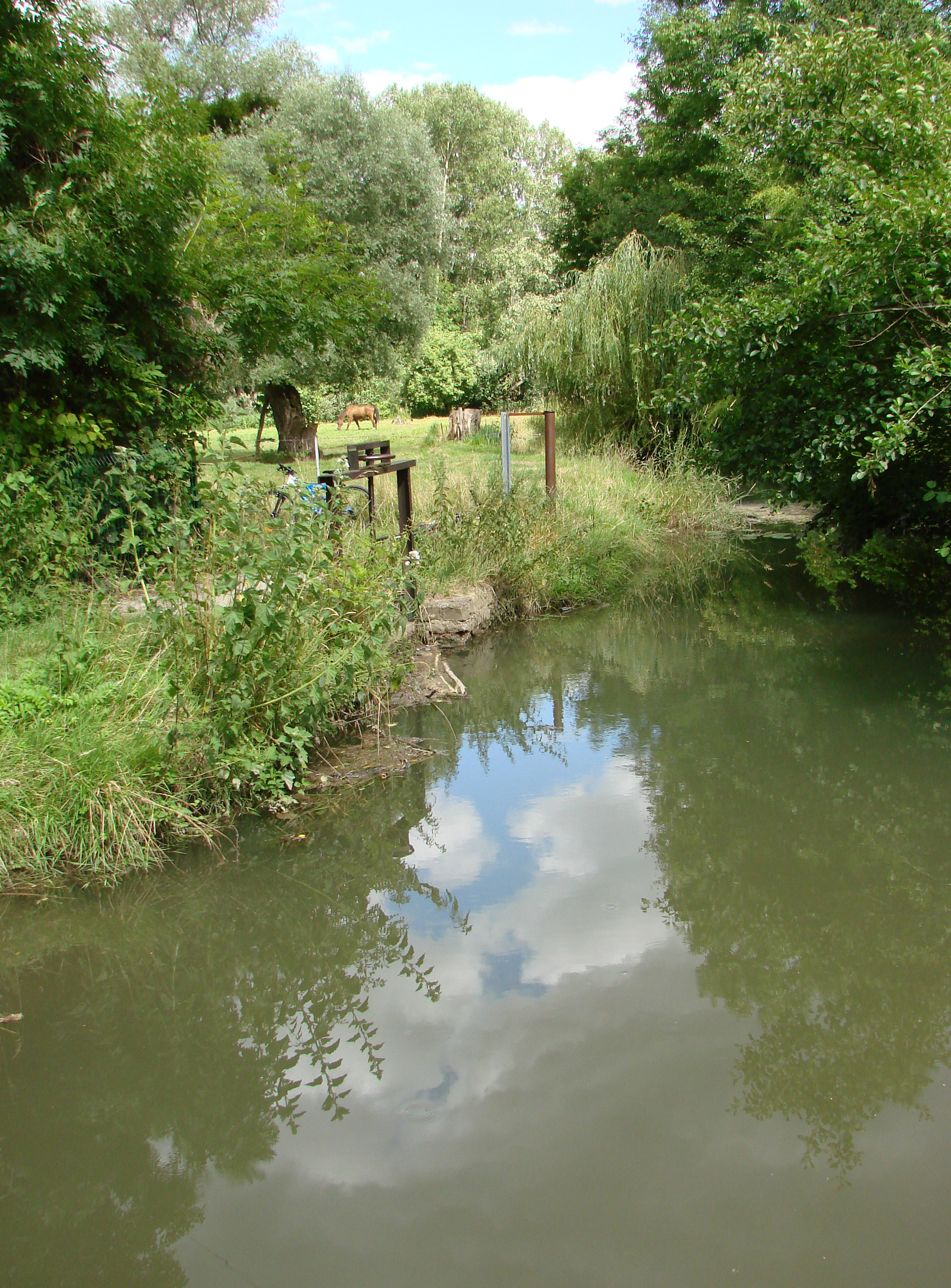
The Ardre at Crugny, at the point where a stream joins the river. A sluice has been inserted. This would enable the controlled watering of the pasture at times when the tributary stream had dried up.

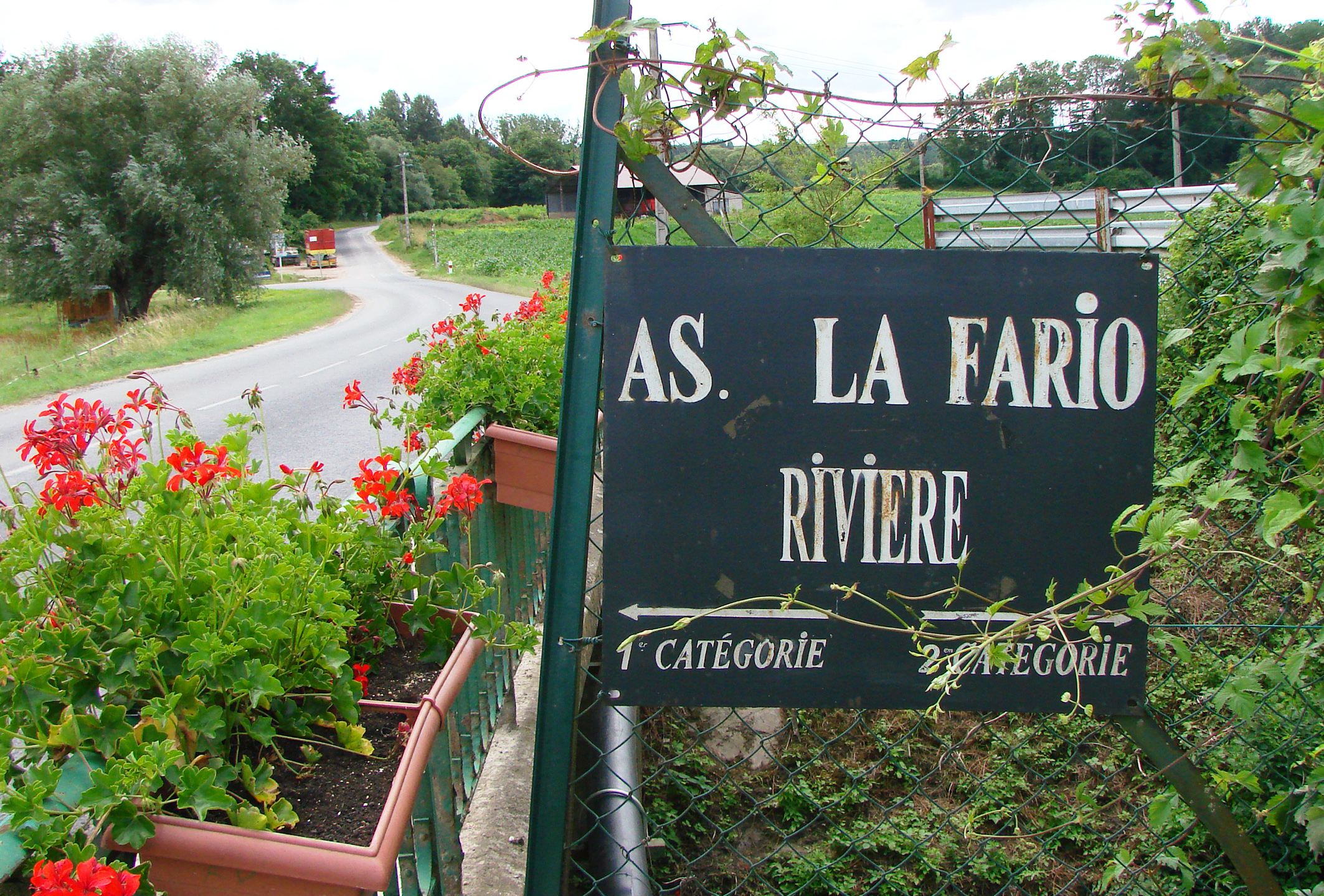
The bridge at Faverolles is the limit between the first and second class fisheries. ("La fario" is the brown trout – Salmo trutta fario.)

At the point of lowest mean flow, in the case of a drought to be expected statistically once in five years, which is not serious, the VCN3.

Unlike the Vesle, in the Ardre peaks in flow can be quite great. This arises from the small mean flow and the small catchment area. The QIX 10 is 17 m^{3} per second, the QIX 20, 21 m^{3}, while the QIX 50 is 25 m^{3} per second. (The mean monthly flow in the wettest month of the year is 2,54 m^{3} per second.)

The greatest momentary flow recorded at Fismes during the period of evaluation was 28,6 m^{3} per second on the 26 March 1988, while the maximum daily flow was 22,5 m^{3} per second, on the same day. Comparing the former value with the QUIX scale for the river, this flow was greater than the 60 year maximum calculated from the QUIX 50, therefore exceptional.

== Fisheries ==
The Ardre is a water of the first category down to the bridge at Faverolles-et-Coëmy, in other words, it is fished primarily for salmonids such as brown trout (Salmo trutta fario). Below the bridge, it becomes a second category river, offering principally cyprinids (white fish).

== History ==
The Ardre became a footnote in British military history as the river down the valley of which the British 51st and 62nd Divisions, with attached New Zealanders, fought in cooperation with French V Army forces on each flank and with Italian artillery support, in July 1918, during the Second Battle of the Aisne.
