= Saint-Gilles, Marne =

Saint-Gilles
- Commune
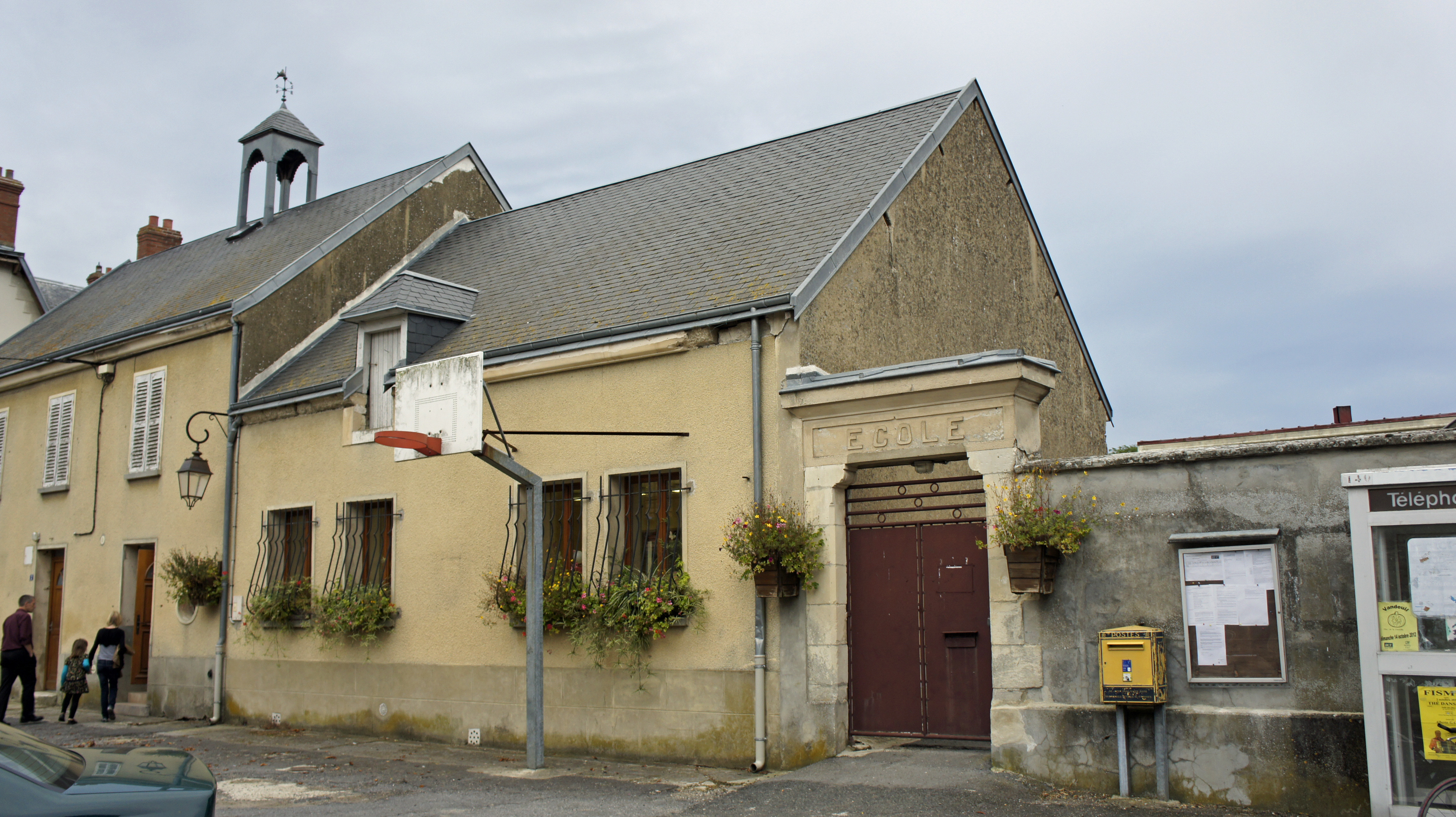
- The town hall in Saint-Gilles
- Location of Saint-Gilles
- Location within France Location within Grand Est
- Coordinates: 49°16′51″N 3°40′36″E
- Country: France
- Region: Grand Est
- Department: Marne
- Arrondissement: Reims
- Canton: Fismes-Montagne de Reims
- Intercommunality: CU Grand Reims

Government
  - Mayor (2020–2026): Evelyne Fraeyman
- Area^{1}: 6.37 km^{2} (2.46 sq mi)
- Elevation: 68 m (223 ft)
- Population (2023): 270
  - Density: 42/km^{2} (110/sq mi)
- Time zone: UTC+01:00 (CET)
  - Summer (DST): UTC+02:00 (CEST)
- INSEE/Postal code: 51484 /51170
- ^{1} French Land Register data, which excludes lakes, ponds, glaciers > 1 km^{2} (0.386 sq mi or 247 acres) and river estuaries.

Saint-Gilles (French pronunciation: [sɛ̃ ʒil]) is a commune in the Marne department in north-eastern France.

== See also ==
- Communes of the Marne department
