= Vesle =

River in France

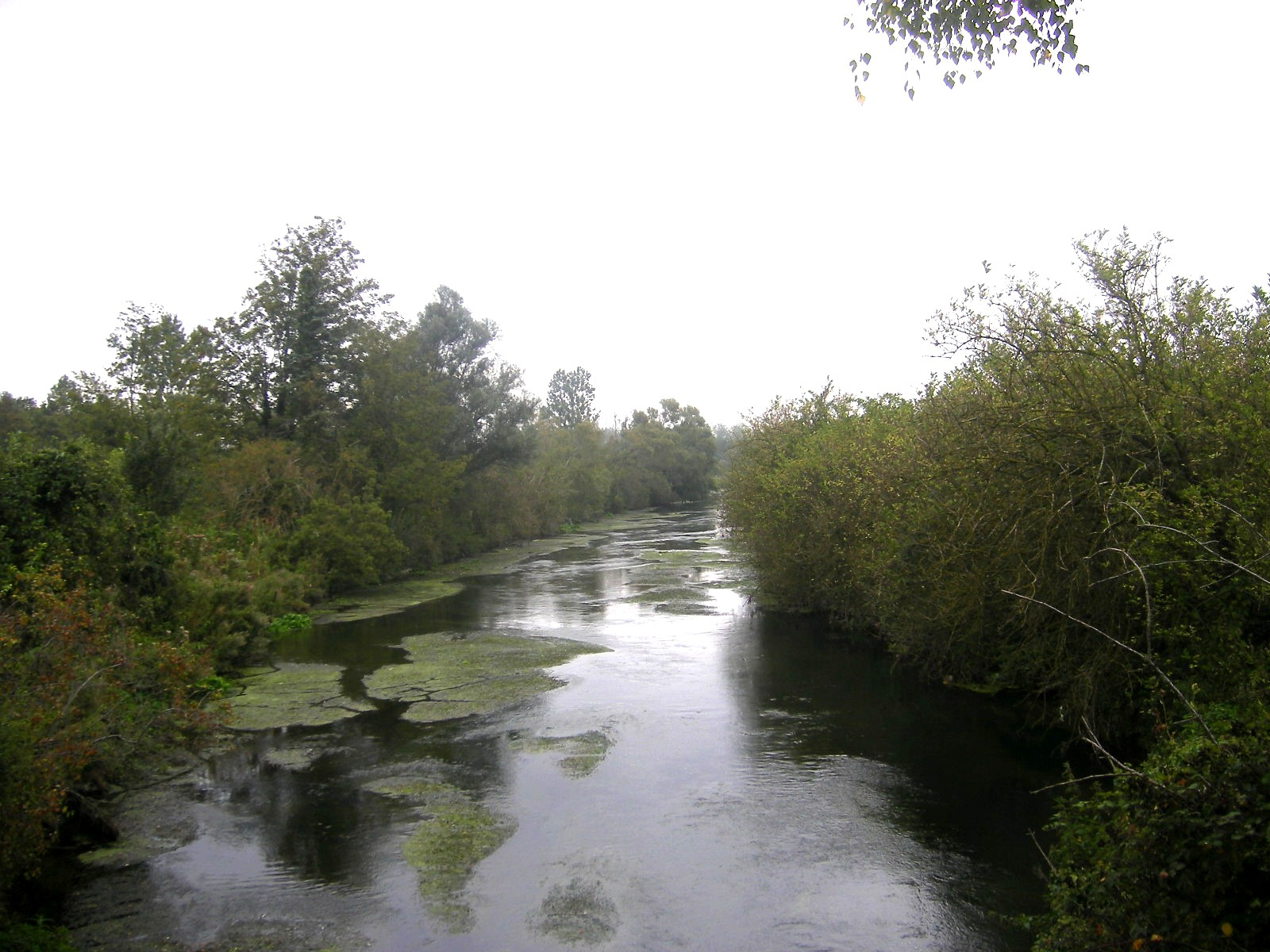
- The Vesle at Muizon

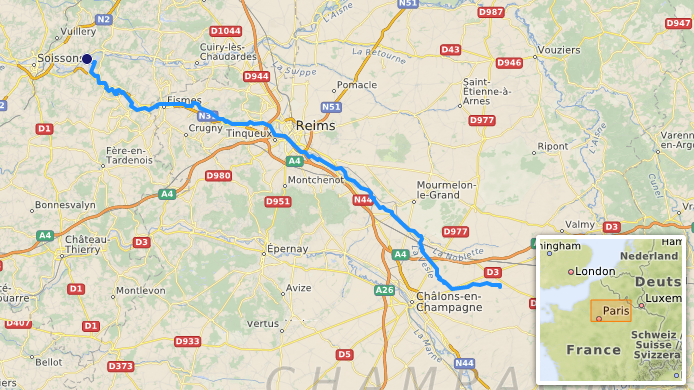

Location
- Country: France

Physical characteristics
- Source
  - elevation: 187 m (614 ft)
- Mouth
  - location: Aisne
  - coordinates: 49°23′34″N 3°28′7″E
- Length: 139 km (86 mi)
- Basin size: 1,460 km^{2} (560 sq mi)
- Discharge
  - average: 7.72 m^{3}/s (273 cu ft/s)

Basin features
- Progression: Aisne→ Oise→ Seine→ English Channel

The Vesle (French pronunciation: [vɛl]) is the river on which the city of Reims stands. It is a fourth order river of France and a left-bank tributary of the Aisne. It is 139.4 km (86.6 mi) long, and rises in the département of Marne through which it flows for most of its course.

== Geography ==
The Vesle flows through the following départements and towns:

- Marne: Courtisols, Reims, Fismes
- Aisne: Braine

It rises at an elevation of about 187 metres (614 ft), on the dip slope of the Upper Cretaceous chalk, near the village of Somme-Vesle, east of Châlons-en-Champagne. Though still passing through the chalk country, it soon begins to flow on its own Holocene deposits. It passes through Reims (latitude 49° 15’ 57’’ N, longitude 4° 1’ 46’’ E). On leaving the city's western outskirts, it enters the much more wooded landscape of the Eocene geology. The info box photograph shows the Vesle as it passes through fen carr, a little downstream from Reims. Halfway From Reims to Soissons, at Fismes (Latitude 49° 18' 28" N Longitude 03° 40' 53" E) the river receives the river Ardre from its left bank. At Condé-sur-Aisne, having descended to an elevation of about 45 metres (148 ft), the Vesle joins the Aisne.

=== Communications ===
From Sept Saulx, some 20 km. above Reims, and into the city, the river is paralleled by the Aisne to Marne Canal. Below Reims, its valley accommodates the road, now the N31/E46, between the two former Gaulish tribal centres of Reims and Soissons.

=== Tributaries ===
- The Noblette joins from the right bank near Vadenay;
- the Cheneu joins from the right bank at Mourmelon-le-Petit;
- the Fosse joins from the left bank at Muizon.
- The Ardre is its principal tributary. It joins from the left bank, at Fismes.

=== Flow rates of the Vesle at Braine ===
The Vesle is a river of medium flow, like most which come from the chalkland of the Champagne-Ardenne région. Its flow was recorded over a period of 34 years (1967-2000), at Braine, in the department of Aisne. That is to say a little short of its confluence with the Aisne. The catchment area down to this point is 1,440 km^{2} (560 sq mi), very nearly the whole basin.

The yearly mean flow or discharge of the river at Braine is 7.72 m^{3}/s (273 cu ft/s).

Seasonal fluctuations in the flow are very small. The high waters of the winter/spring period take the monthly mean to a level of between 9.2 m^{3}/s (320 cu ft/s) and 12.6 m^{3}/s (440 cu ft/s), from January to May inclusive (with a maximum in March) and the low waters of late Summer/ early Autumn, August to October inclusive, with a minimum of 3.66 m^{3}/s (129 cu ft/s) in September. The difference is nonetheless noticeable.

== History ==
The N31 road has seen the passage of many kings, emperors and armies over the centuries. The French kings were crowned at Reims and usually returned to Paris this way. The river's upper reaches pass over the chalk plain of Champaigne Once rather disparagingly called Champaigne Pouilleuse, because of its poverty. This region has long been used for military training, its geology and use being similar to those of Salisbury Plain. The training ground nearest to it is at the Camp de Mourmelon. During the Great War of 1914–18, the river's valley was just behind the French-held front but at times, particularly in the spring and summer of 1918, it was heavily fought over. See Second Battle of the Marne.

== Ecology ==
Two important natural zones of ecological, zoological and botanical interest, (ZNIEFF) have been decreed on the length of the Vesle. The first is upstream from Reims and designated as 'The great fens of the Vesle Valley from Prunay to Courmelois' (Les grands Marais du Val de Vesle de Prunay à Courmelois). It extends to 400 hectares. The second, which is much more extensive carries the name Vallée de la Vesle de Livry-Louvercy à Courlandon and covers 2,682 ha. extending both above and below Reims. It includes some land in the city itself and covers about 46 km. of the river's length.
