= Muizon =

- Commune
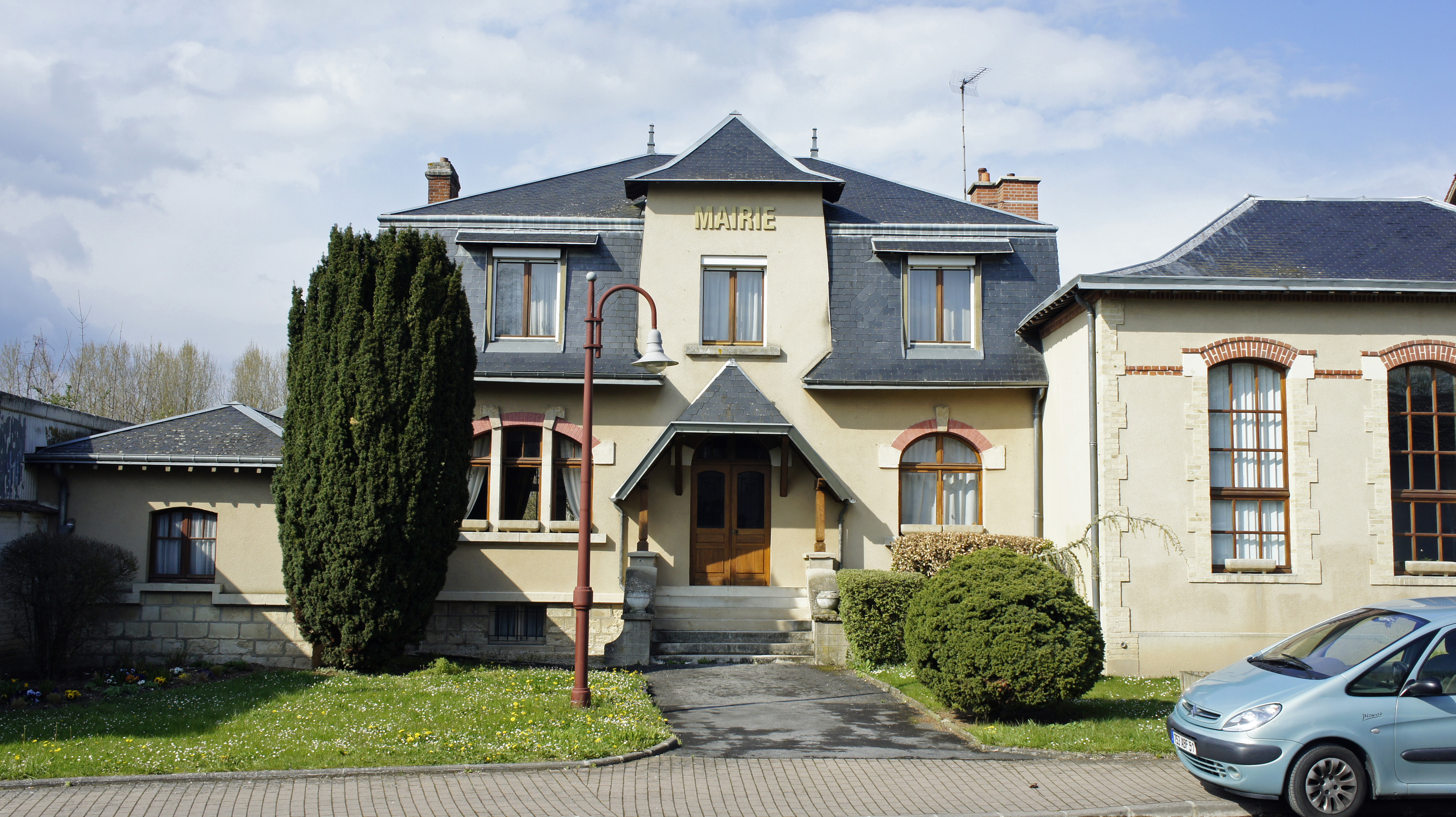
- The town hall in Muizon
- Location of Muizon
- Location within France Location within Grand Est
- Coordinates: 49°16′29″N 3°53′30″E
- Country: France
- Region: Grand Est
- Department: Marne
- Arrondissement: Reims
- Canton: Fismes-Montagne de Reims
- Intercommunality: CU Grand Reims

Government
  - Mayor (2020–2026): Germain Renard
- Area^{1}: 7.15 km^{2} (2.76 sq mi)
- Highest elevation: 111 m (364 ft)
- Lowest elevation: 67 m (220 ft)
- Population (2023): 2,081
  - Density: 291/km^{2} (754/sq mi)
- Demonym: Muizonnais
- Time zone: UTC+01:00 (CET)
  - Summer (DST): UTC+02:00 (CEST)
- INSEE/Postal code: 51391 /51140
- ^{1} French Land Register data, which excludes lakes, ponds, glaciers > 1 km^{2} (0.386 sq mi or 247 acres) and river estuaries.

Muizon (French pronunciation: [mɥizɔ̃]) is a commune in the Marne department in north-eastern France. Muizon station has rail connections to Reims and Fismes.

== Population ==
Historical population
Year	Pop.	±% p.a.
1968	480	—
1975	1,031	+11.54%
1982	2,243	+11.74%
1990	2,255	+0.07%
1999	2,346	+0.44%
2007	2,285	−0.33%
2012	2,174	−0.99%
2017	2,161	−0.12%
2023	2,081	−0.63%
Source: INSEE

== See also ==
- Communes of the Marne department
