= Fismes station =

Railway station in Fismes, France

Fismes
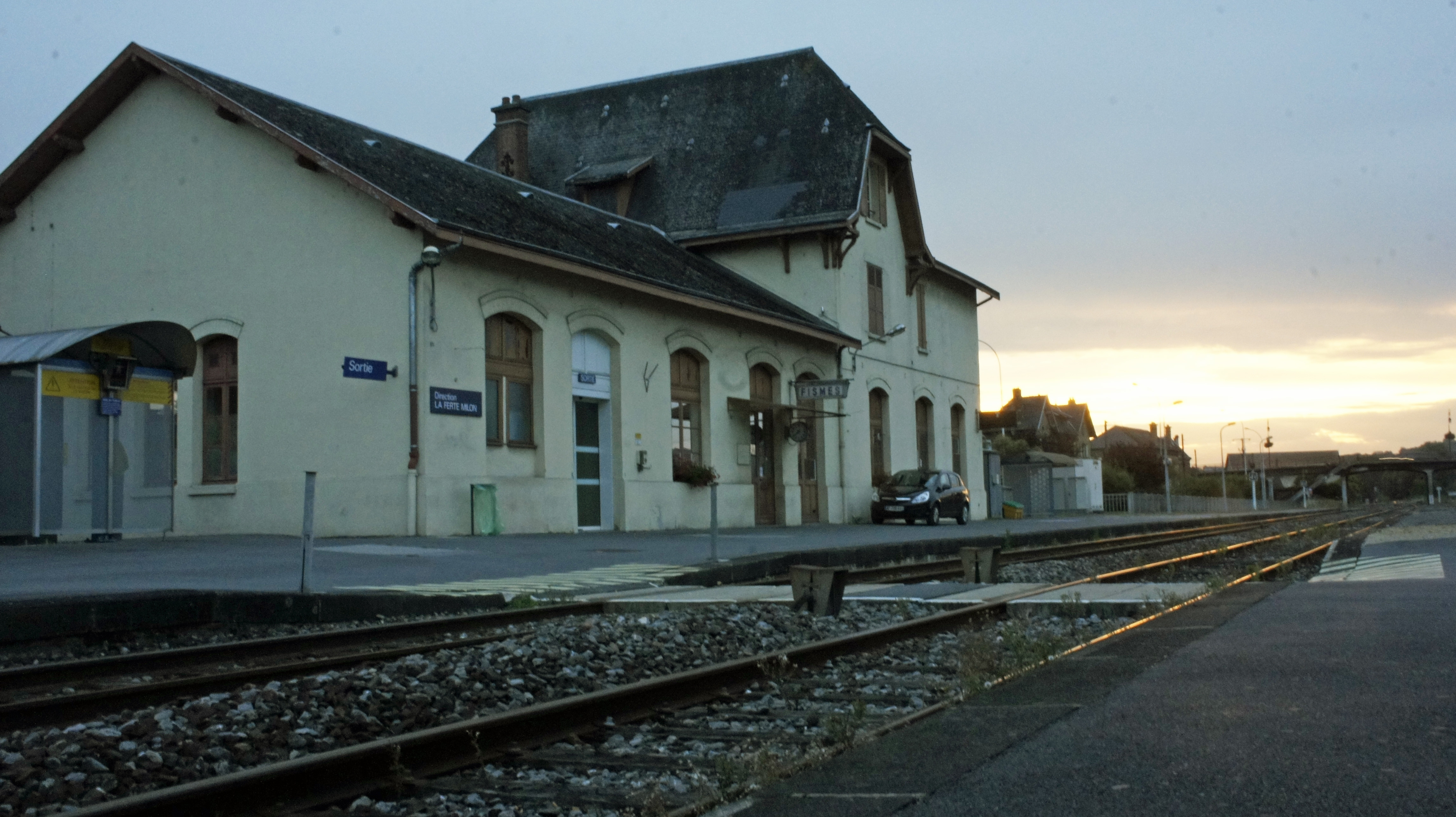

General information
- Location: Place de la Gare; 51170 Fismes; Marne, France
- Coordinates: 49.3107°N 3.6821°E
- Elevation: 62 m (203 ft)
- Owner: SNCF
- Operator: SNCF

Other information
- Station code: 87171330

History
- Opened: 16 April 1862

Passengers
- 2018: 184,856

Services
Preceding station	TER Grand Est	Following station
Terminus	C11	Magneux–Courlandon towards Reims
Location

Fismes station (French: Gare de Fismes) is a railway station located in the French municipality of Fismes, in the département of Marne.

== History ==
Opened by the Compagnie des chemins de fer des Ardennes on 16 April 1862, the line between Soissons and Reims included a station in Fismes.

Since 3 April 2016, the train link between Fismes and La Ferté-Milon has been replaced by a similar bus service.

== Services ==
The station building is equipped with a passenger waiting room, staffed ticket window and automatic ticket vending machines.

The station is served by TER Grand Est trains towards Reims.

Station facilities also include parking for personal automobiles and bikes.

== Gallery ==
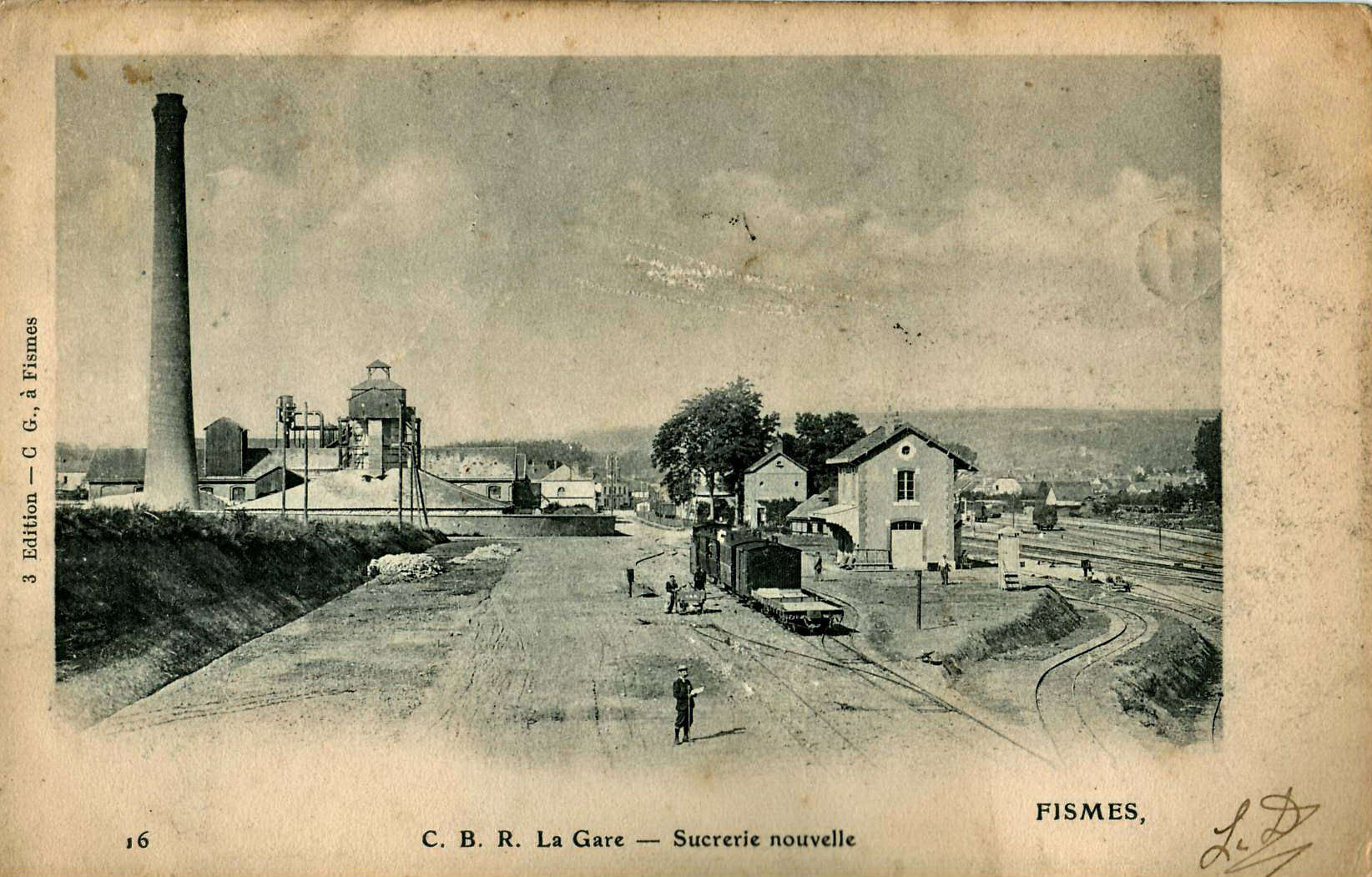
Installations at the station prior to World War I.
