= Fismes =

- Commune
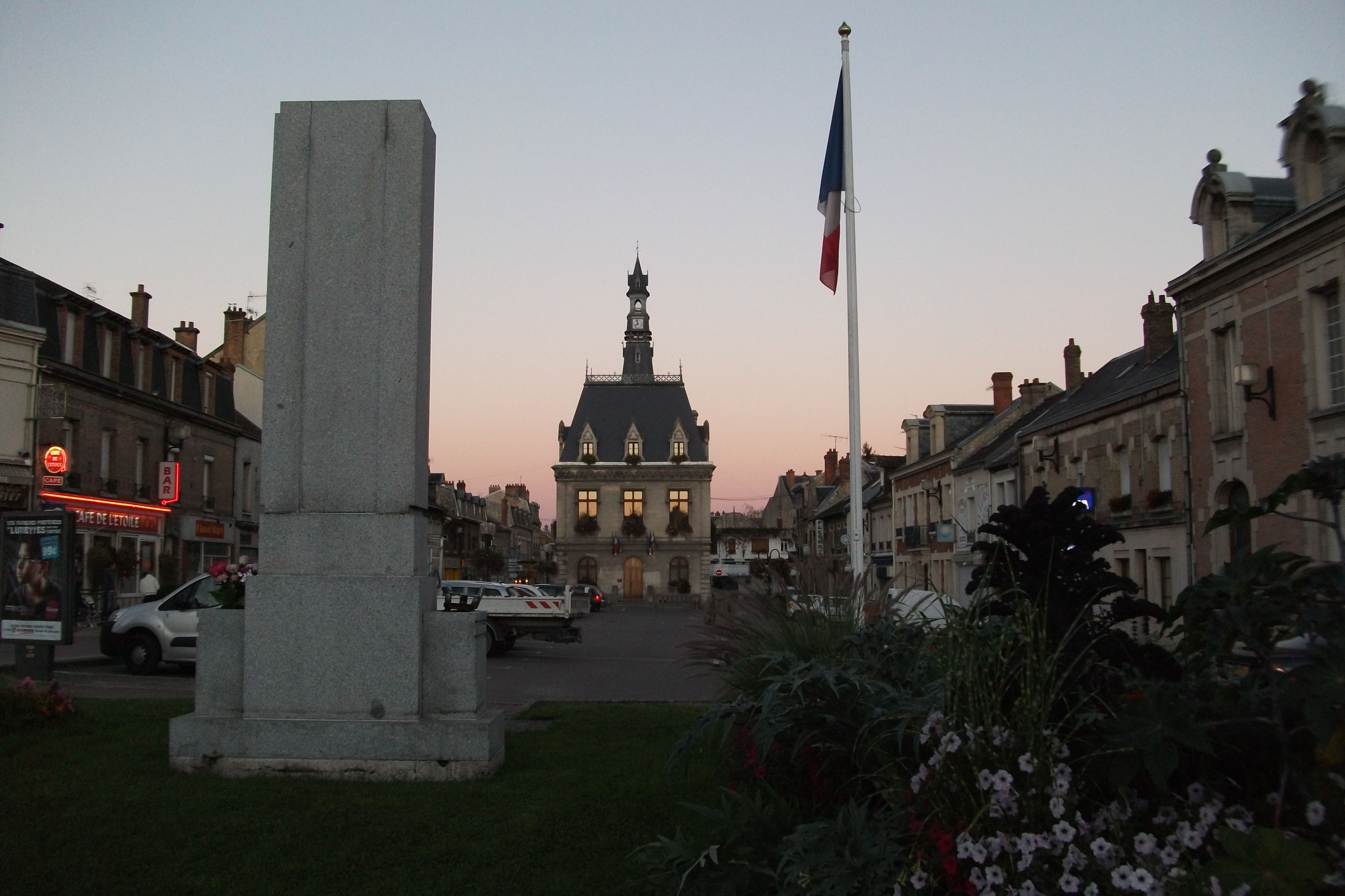
- The Town Hall Square

- Coat of arms
- Location of Fismes
- Location within France Location within Grand Est
- Coordinates: 49°18′28″N 3°40′53″E
- Country: France
- Region: Grand Est
- Department: Marne
- Arrondissement: Reims
- Canton: Fismes-Montagne de Reims
- Intercommunality: CU Grand Reims

Government
  - Mayor (2020–2026): Charles Gossard
- Area^{1}: 16.75 km^{2} (6.47 sq mi)
- Highest elevation: 179 m (587 ft)
- Lowest elevation: 57 m (187 ft)
- Population (2023): 5,850
  - Density: 349/km^{2} (905/sq mi)
- Time zone: UTC+01:00 (CET)
  - Summer (DST): UTC+02:00 (CEST)
- INSEE/Postal code: 51250 /51170
- ^{1} French Land Register data, which excludes lakes, ponds, glaciers > 1 km^{2} (0.386 sq mi or 247 acres) and river estuaries.

Fismes (French pronunciation: [fim]) is a commune in the Marne department in the Grand Est region of north-eastern France.

The commune has been awarded three flowers in the Competition of cities and villages in Bloom.

== Geography ==
Fismes is located 25 km west by northwest of Reims and some 12 km east by southeast of Braine. Access is by National Highway N31 from Reims through the heart of the commune and the town and continuing west to Soissons. There is also the D967 road from Longueval-Barbonval in the north to the town and continuing southwest to Chery-Chartreuve. There is also the D386 going south from the village to Saint-Gilles. Apart from Fismes there are three hamlets: Fismette and Baslieux are continuations of the urban area of Fismes while Villette is in the east of the commune. Fismes station has rail connections to Reims.

The Vesle river flows through the commune from east to west with the Ruisseau du Moulin and the Ruisseau Saint-Marie flow from the north into the Vesle. The Ardre river flows from the south to join the Vesle west of the town.

== History ==
=== Antiquity ===
Fismes, on the right bank of the Vesle, developed from a Gallic ancient town named, during the Gallo-Roman era, "Ad Fines Suessionum" (limit of the Suessiones' territory) or "Ad Fines Remorum" (limit of the Remi's territory), as the city was situated on the boundary of the two Gallic tribes Suessiones and Remi.

As Charles Rostaing indicates, the Latin word "fines" is a translation from the Gallic toponym equoranda which means "boundary" or "limit".

=== Middle Ages ===
The barbaric period did not spare Fismes. During the first half of the Middle Ages, the Normands and the Hungarians, destroyed the city of Fismes multiple times. These ravages pushed the agglomeration of the city towards the heights of the Vesle's right bank.

In 1226 Thibault IV, the Chansonnier (songwriter), helped Fismes become a free city, thanks to hard work of natives that participated in the war led by Thibault. By a charter and a seal that bears the emblem of the commune and under the aegis of a mayor and two deputies, Fismes became autonomous. Thus, the village was able to develop its artisanship, businesses, festivals and markets.

The walls of the city continued to expand; a church of stone, a château which occupied the current plaza of the post office and would one day house as governor, the poet Eustache Deschamps, as well as the City Hall, that continues to occupy the same place, were all constructed in this formative epoch.

The Hundred Years War between the English and the French brought, once again, the city of Fismes to ruins. Later the religious wars and the Fronde completely destroyed the walls of the city and the chateau of Fismes.

=== Modern Era ===
From Louis XIII to Charles X almost all the future Kings of France passed through Fismes which was their last stop on the way to their coronation at the Cathedral of Reims. The Coronation of Charles X was the final time this happened as the July Revolution brought an end to the traditional coronation ceremony.

In 1646, Louis, Grand Condé acquired the manorial rights to Fismes and bestowed them on César de Costentin de Tourville for his good services to the King. In 1647, the land was passed on to the eldest son of Cesar, François-Cesar.

During the Fronde, the ramparts of the city and the chateau were completely destroyed.

After the revolution, a time of much inner conflict among the people of Fismes, Napoleon came to Fismes in order to sign two important declarations. Following Napoleon and the French Revolution, 30,000 Prussians arrived in Fismes and, once again, plundered the village.

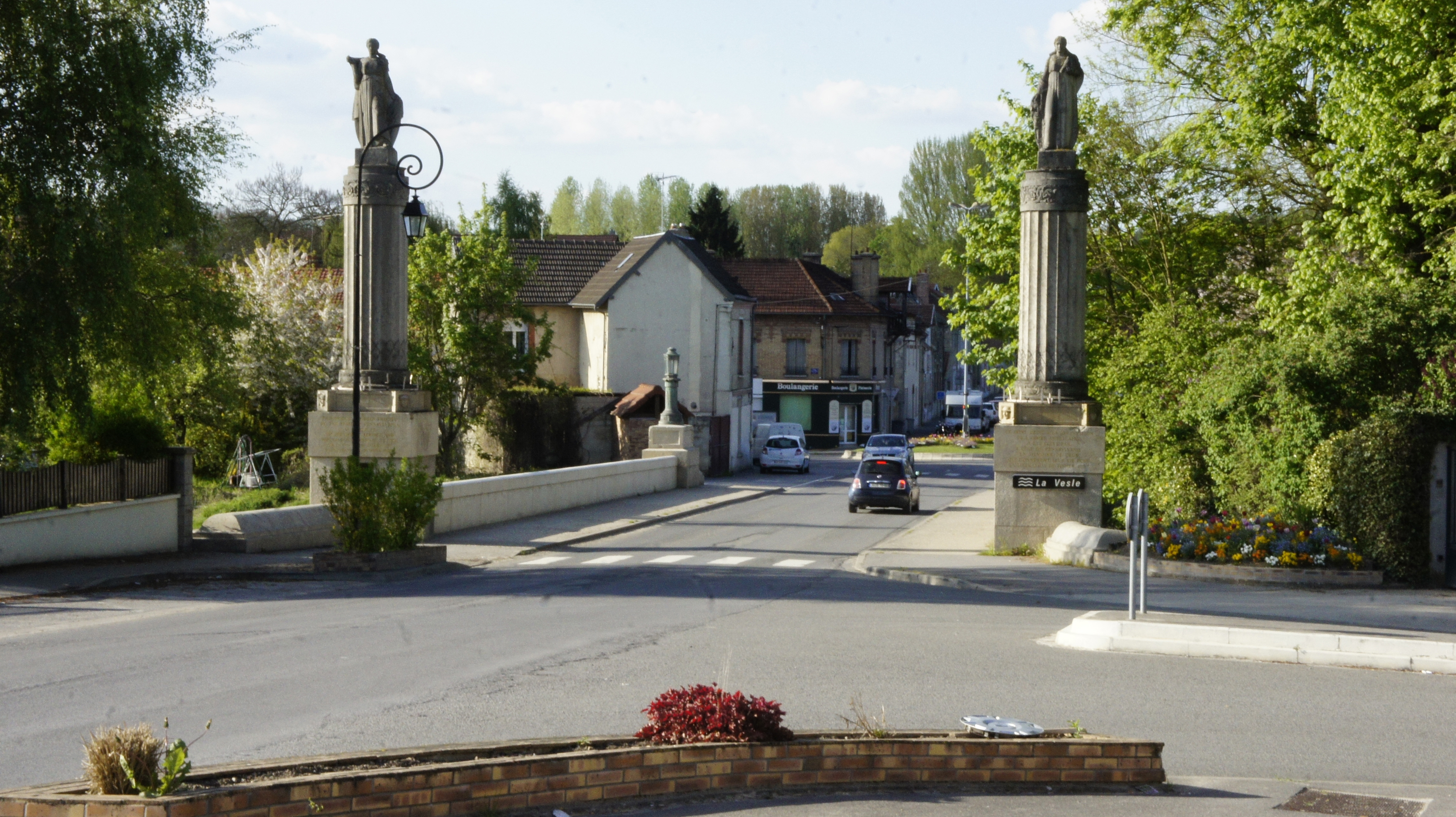
Memorial Bridge for the 28th Infantry Division (United States).

In the 19th century, France experienced the rapidly expanding industrial revolution. Sugar beet, porcelain of Fismes (which was rare and expensive), the foundry, the railway, hat making, tanneries and mills mark the advancements of the region and the economic history of this century.

The 20th century began in worse conditions than the preceding finished. Fismes was greatly affected by the First World War. The Germans invaded the city, then remained on the Chemin des Dames before they completely demolished the city in 1918.

Fismes attempted to reconstruct itself slowly. Unfortunately, due to its position as a railway town through which passed trains filled with deportees being sent to Germany, the city suffered during the course of the Second World War. 14 residents of Fismes, who were seized for acts of resistance, died in Nazi concentration camps. Among them was the mayor of Fismes, Doctor Genillon.

=== Heraldry ===
Arms of Fismes	Blazon: Quarterly, 1 and 4 of Gules a dexter arm of argent armed with a sword the same surmounted by a helmet of azure quarter turned from profile; 2 and 3 barry of argent and azure of 10 pieces debruised by 3 chevrons of gules, the first écimé; over all an inescutcheon of azure with 3 persons armed in Or: at dexter with a lance, at centre with a sword and at sinister with a halberd, bordered in argent charged with the legend SIGILL. MAIORIS ET IURATORIUN COMMUNIE DE FIMES in capital letters plain of sable.

== Administration ==
=== Administrative situation ===
The town has been the capital of the Canton of Fismes since its inception during the French Revolution. It belongs to the arrondissement of Reims (district of Reims until 1801).

Fismes is part of the Communauté urbaine du Grand Reims.

List of Successive Mayors

Mayors from the French Revolution to 1937

From	To	Name	Party	Position
1793	1794	François Bonde		
1794	1795	Henri Servant		
1795	1798	Claude Louis le Tellier		
1798	1805	Henri Servant		
1805	1805	Pierre Edmé Barbey		
1806	1810	Henri Servant		
1810	1811	Barbey de Chambrecy		
1811	1814	Louis Heurtevin		
1814	1814	Antoine or Jean Baptiste Pilloy		
1814	1814	Gérard Billet		
1814	1815	Antoine Clement		
1815	1822	Gérard Billet		
1822	1829	Pierre Barbey de Chambrecy		
1829	1836	Jean Philippe Brule		
1836	1871	Pierre Louis Regnault		
1871	1890	Jean Philippe Brule		
1890	1919	Constantin Couvreur		
1919	1919	Henri Goumant		
1919	1929	Edgard Maquerlot		
1929	1932	Lucien Laplanche		
1932	1934	Paul Bouche		
1934	1936	Fernand Genillon		Doctor
1936	1937	Louis Cochoit		

Mayors from 1937

From	To	Name	Party	Position
1937	1944	Fernand Genillon		Arrested in the exercise of his duties. Died for France at Buchenwald in 1944
1944	1945	Ernest Guyomar		
1945	1947	Henri Bertho		
1947	1948	Edmond Launoy		
1948	1971	Marc Olivier		
1971	1977	Aimé Bouchez		
1977	2001	Paul Caffe	PS	Teacher
2001	2020	Jean Pierre Pinon	PS	Craftsman carpenter retired, General Counsel for the Canton of Fismes
2020	2026	Charles Gossard		

== Demography ==
The inhabitants of the commune are known as Fismois or Fismoises in French.

Historical population

Year	Pop.	±% p.a.
1793	2,025	—
1800	2,129	+0.72%
1806	2,139	+0.08%
1821	1,938	−0.66%
1831	2,110	+0.85%
1836	2,120	+0.09%
1841	2,366	+2.22%
1846	2,422	+0.47%
1851	2,371	−0.42%
1856	2,505	+1.11%
1861	2,705	+1.55%
1866	2,840	+0.98%
1872	2,717	−0.74%
1876	3,218	+4.32%
1881	3,275	+0.35%
1886	3,238	−0.23%
1891	3,303	+0.40%
1896	3,343	+0.24%
1901	3,355	+0.07%

Year	Pop.	±% p.a.
1906	3,411	+0.33%
1911	3,330	−0.48%
1921	2,338	−3.47%
1926	3,186	+6.38%
1931	3,151	−0.22%
1936	3,111	−0.26%
1946	3,029	−0.27%
1954	3,222	+0.78%
1962	3,490	+1.00%
1968	3,634	+0.68%
1975	4,233	+2.20%
1982	4,674	+1.43%
1990	5,286	+1.55%
1999	5,313	+0.06%
2007	5,344	+0.07%
2012	5,413	+0.26%
2017	5,487	+0.27%
2023	5,850	+1.07%

Source: EHESS and INSEE

== Economy ==
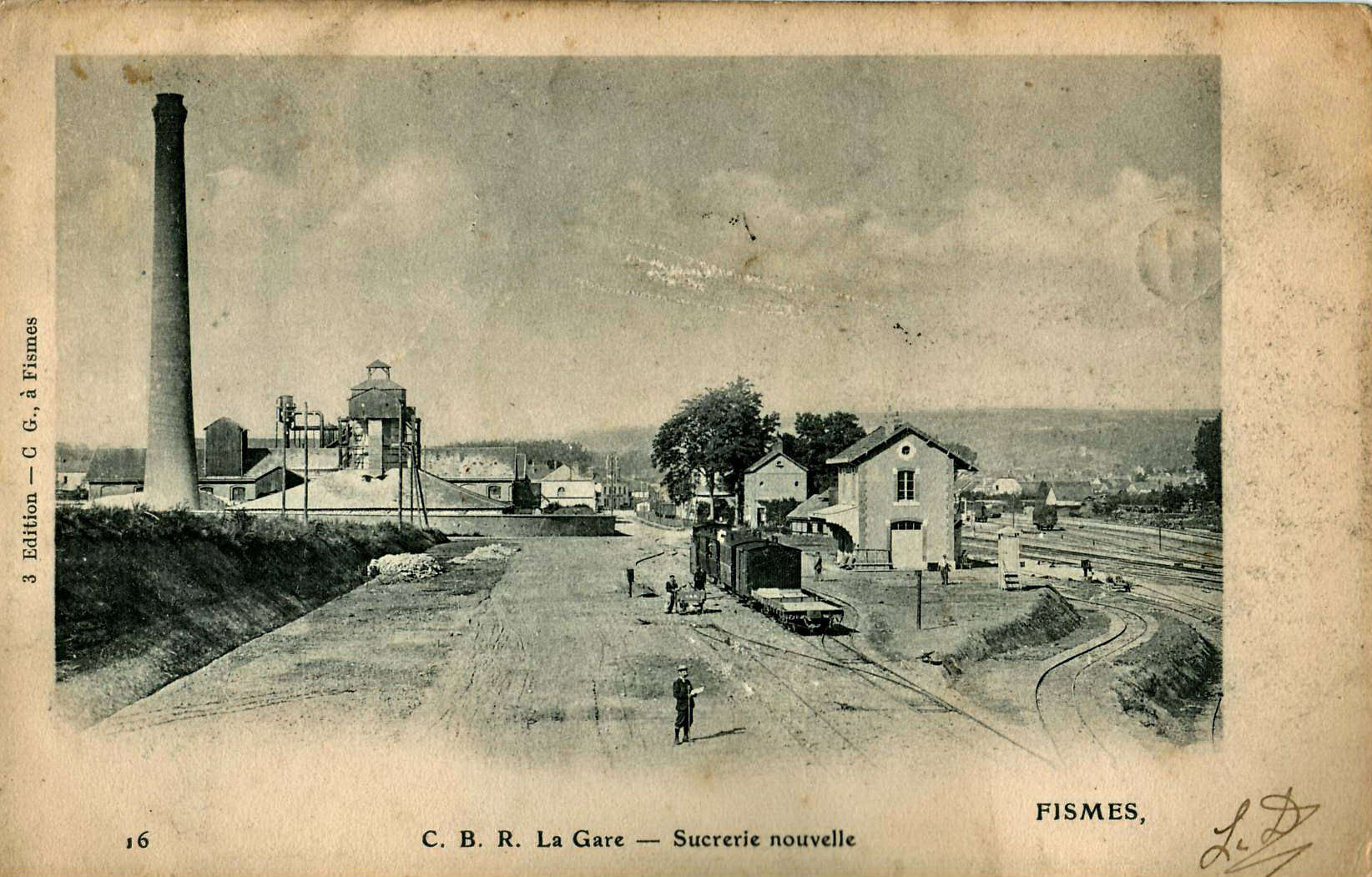
A train of the Chemins de fer de la Banlieue de Reims at Fismes station before the First World War, next to a large sugar refinery.

The local economy was dominated by the presence of a sugar factory which ceased operations in 1978. The activity of light metalworking has also been present for a long time.

Since 2008 the commune of Fismes has been integrated into the production zone for Champagne. The parcels of land authorized for planting vineyards are not yet known.

The main business enterprises are Campa (manufacturing premium electric heaters), Finaxo (methods for water treatment and waste), Profinox, Fimaluplast (Aluminium Joinery and PVC), and Experton-Revollier (wire mesh surfaces); a family group recently took over the Ghent company.

== Culture and heritage ==
=== Civil heritage ===
The commune has a number of buildings and structures that are registered as historical monuments:

- The Laplanche Foundry (19th century)
- The Ets Déodat Fancy Goods Factory (20th century)
- The Ets Beucher Wire Works (20th century)
- The Goumant Sugar Refinery (20th century)
- The War Memorial (20th century) This First World War memorial was sculpted by François Mourgues with the help of architect Edward Veis and marbler Mr. Renaud
- The Ets Gantois Wire Works (20th century)
- The Roland Flour Mill (20th century)

Other sites of interest

- The Town Hall
- The Town ramparts
- The Royal Milestones on the route to Soissons which was the route to the coronation
- Heurtevin House where the kings of France often spent their last night as prince;
- The American Memorial Bridge in honour of the 28th Infantry division from Pennsylvania;
- The Bread Museum

=== Religious heritage ===
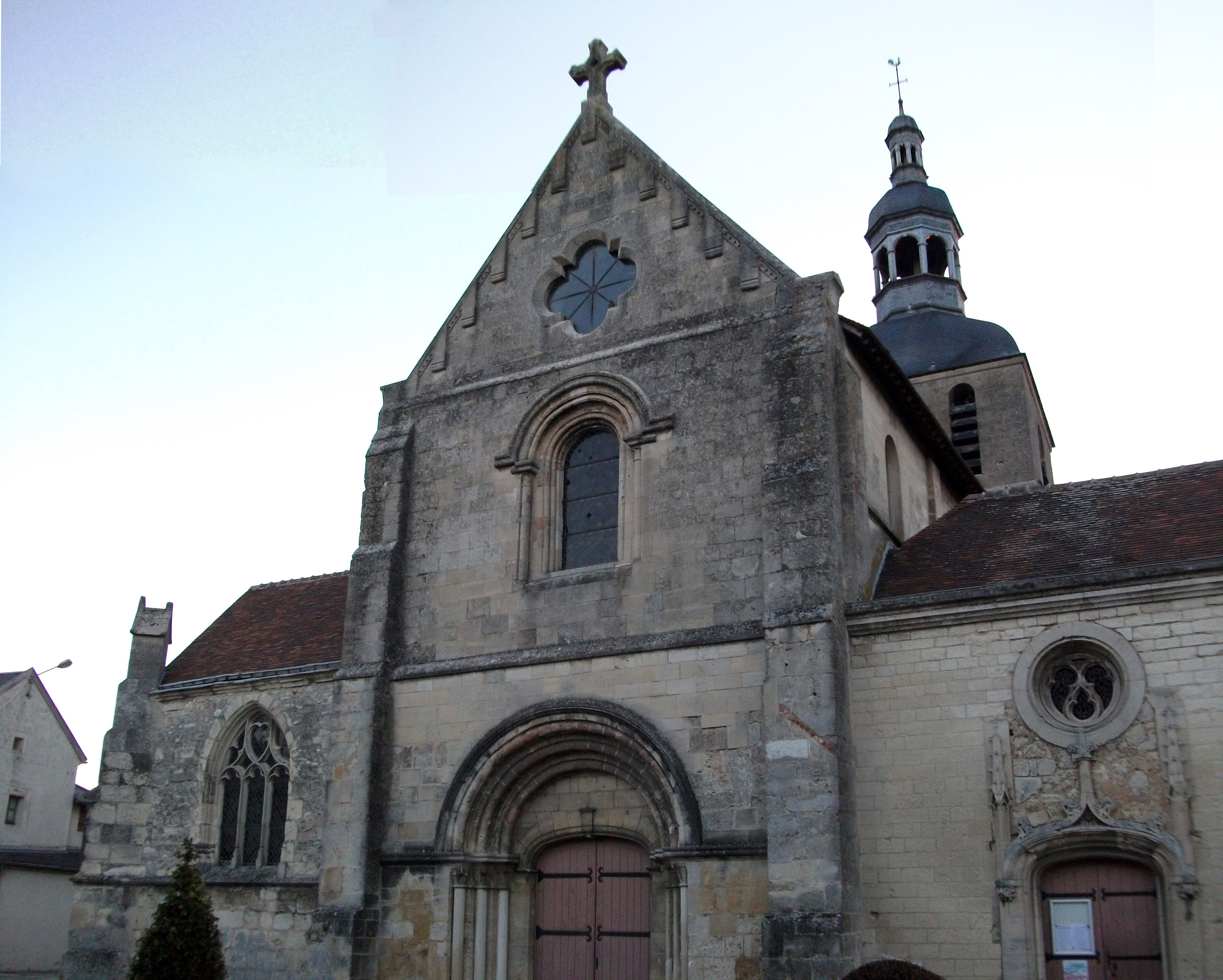
The Church of Saint Macre

- The Church of Saint Macre (12th century) is registered as an historical monument.
- The Pillar of the door on Saint Gilles;

=== Picture Gallery ===
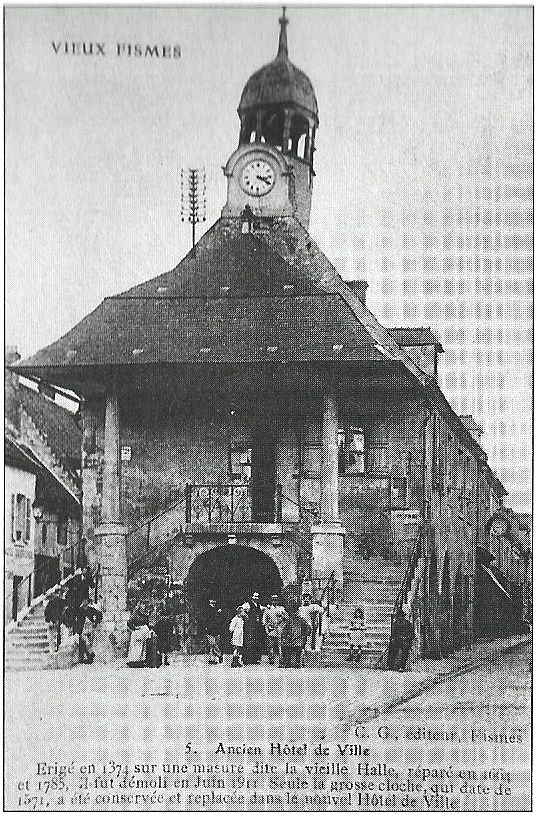
The old Town Hall

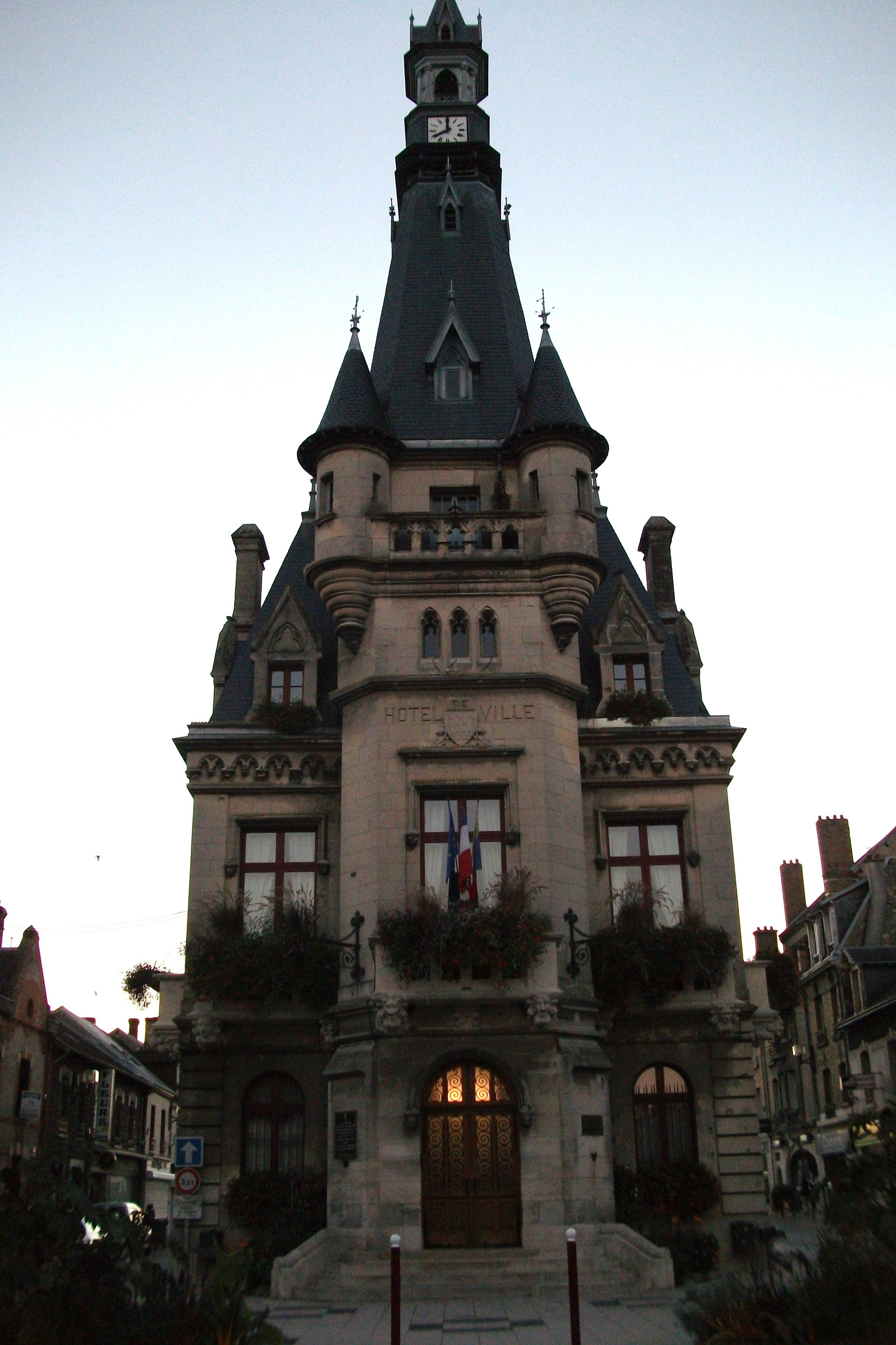
East face of the town hall.

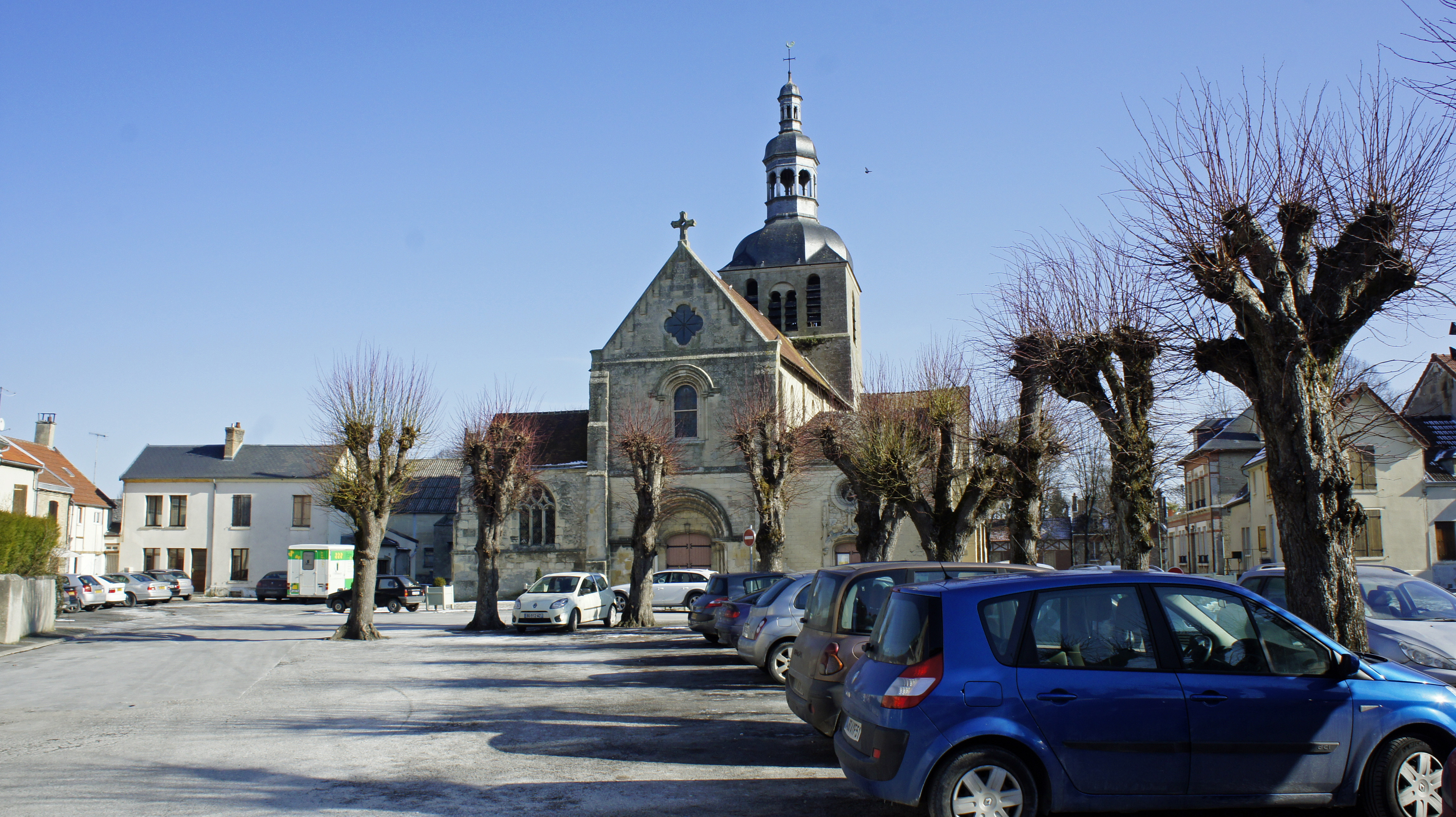
The Church square.

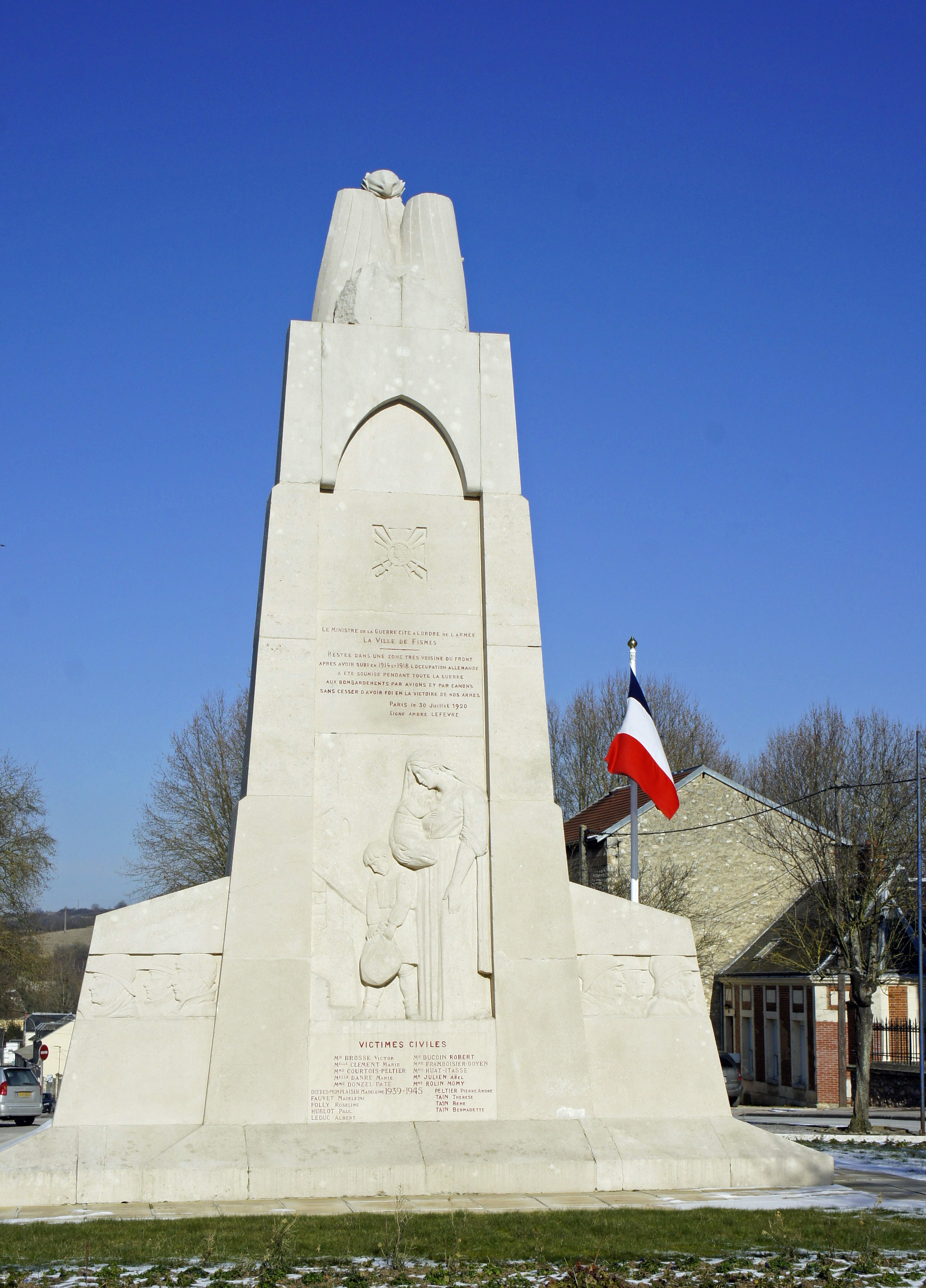
The 1914-1918 war memorial.

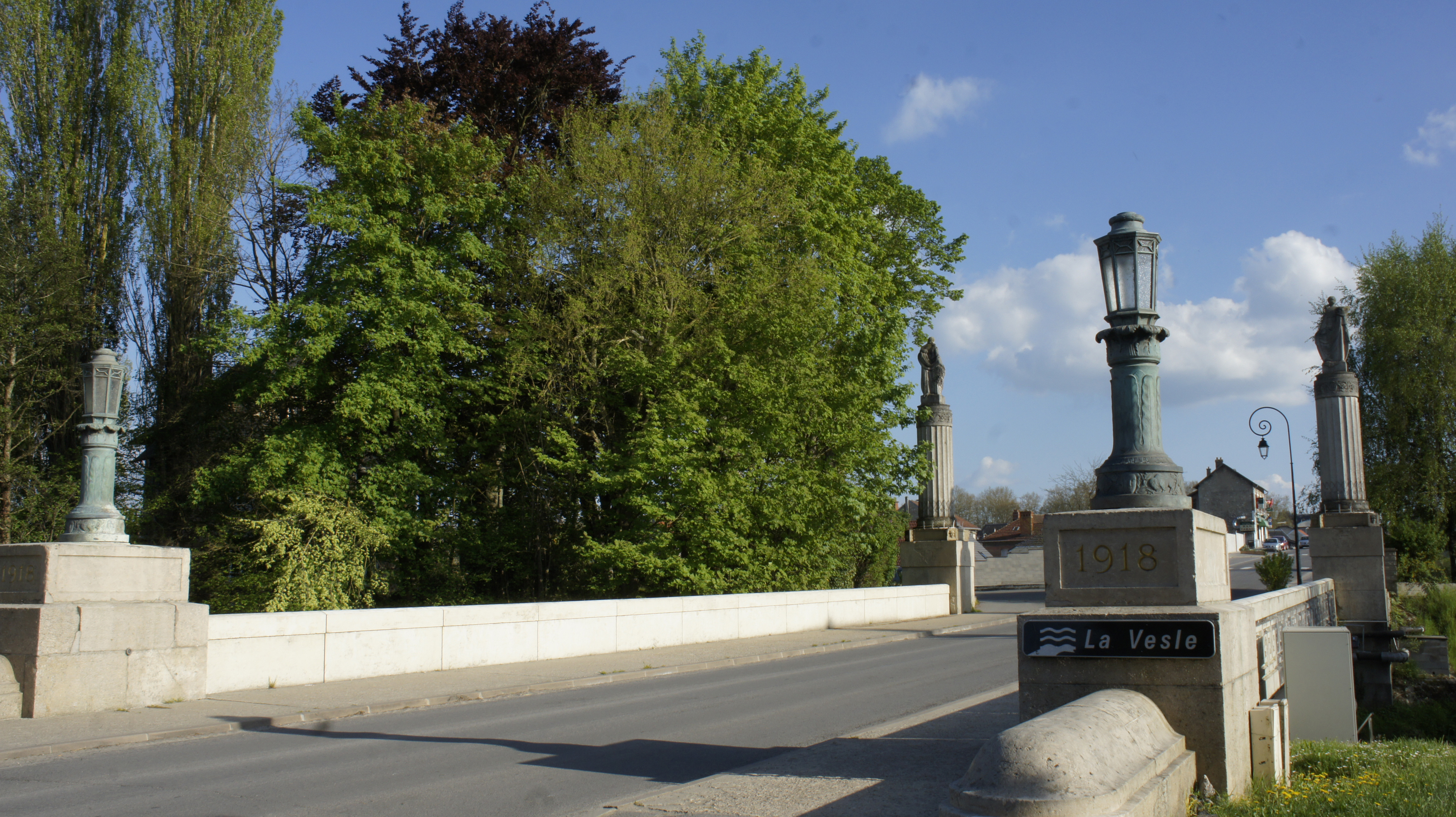
The American Memorial bridge.

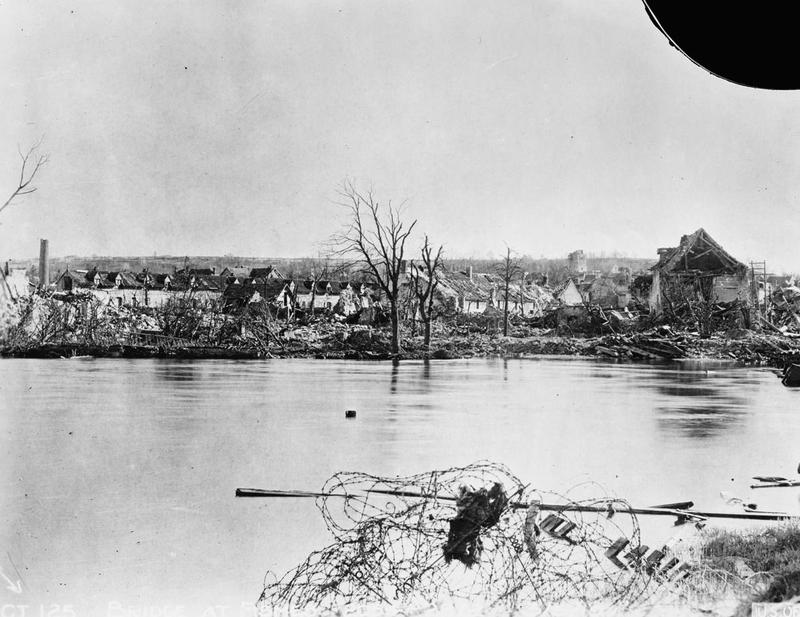
The Bridge at Fismes on 3 May 1918

=== Fismes Memorial '18 ===
The Fismes Memorial site is located along the Vesle river, near the memorial bridge that was constructed with the help of the State of Pennsylvania.

The Battle of Fismes and Fismette that occurred during World War I sparked a lasting friendship between the City of Fismes and the United States, particularly Pennsylvania. This bloody battle took place from 3 August to 1 September 1918 and was the last major German attack on the Allies during World War I. The 32nd American Division lost 2,000 men during its first attempt to cross the Vesle and attack the Germans. The 28th American Infantry Division, consisting of soldiers mostly from Pennsylvania, replaced the former division, forced the Germans to retreat, and proceeded to liberate Fismes.

As a result of the aid Fismes received from the American armies during World War I, the city constructed a memorial to honor the lives of the men in the 28th American Infantry Division. The main intentions of this memorial are to commemorate the soldiers' sacrifices and strengthen the ties that exist between Fismes and the United States, specifically Pennsylvania. The memorial site is the result of a collaboration of the City of Fismes with the Fismes Office of Tourism and the Association of Leisure and Recreation Services.

The memorial consists of informational plaques and a set of sculptures from renowned artist Christian Lapie. Christian Lapie

The memorial was officially inaugurated on 15 September 2018. The mayor of Meadville, Pennsylvania, one of Fismes' sister cities, was present at the ceremony along with Meadville government and community members. Fismes' sister cities of Triuggio, Italy and Bad Oeynhausen, Germany were represented as well.

== Notable people linked to the commune ==
- Athanase Coquerel (1820–1875), theologian
- Félix Billet
- Camille Auguste Mercier (1848–1881), scholar
- Sophie Manéglier (1803–1892), writer
- Albert Uderzo, French cartoonist and co-creator of Astérix, born in Fismes.
- César de Costentin de Tourville (died in 1647), Count of Fismes, military officer, father of Marshall Anne-Hilarion de Tourville, vice-admiral of France.

== Twinning ==
Fismes is twinned with:

- Wem, England
- Bad Oeynhausen, Germany

== See also ==
- Communes of the Marne department
