= Association of Vôge Valley communes =

The Association of Vôge Valley communes (French: Communauté de communes du Val de Vôge) is a former administrative association of rural communes in the Vosges département of eastern France and on the southern edge of the region of Lorraine. It was merged into the Communauté d'agglomération d'Épinal in January 2017.

The name comes from the Vôge Plateau. Created in January 2007, the association had its administrative offices at Bains-les-Bains.

The Communauté de communes comprised the following communes:

- Bains-les-Bains
- La Chapelle-aux-Bois (since 2009)
- Le Clerjus (since 2009)
- Fontenoy-le-Château
- Grandrupt-de-Bains
- Gruey-lès-Surance
- Harsault
- Hautmougey
- La Haye
- Montmotier
- Trémonzey
- Les Voivres
