= Canton of Bains-les-Bains =

Coordinates: 48°0′7″N 6°15′17″E

Bains-les-Bains
- Former canton
- Interactive map of Bains-les-Bains
- Country: France
- Region: Grand Est
- Department: Vosges
- No. of communes: {{{nbcomm}}}
- Disbanded: 2015
- Area: 169.97 km^{2} (65.63 sq mi)
- Population (2012): 3,576
  - Density: 21.04/km^{2} (54.49/sq mi)

The Canton of Bains-les-Bains is a former French administrative and electoral grouping of communes in the Vosges département of eastern France and in the region of Lorraine. It was disbanded following the French canton reorganisation which came into effect in March 2015. It consisted of 12 communes, which joined the canton of Le Val-d'Ajol in 2015. It had 3,576 inhabitants (2012).

Positioned within the arrondissement of Épinal, the canton had its administrative centre at Bains-les-Bains.

== Composition ==
The Canton of Bains-les-Bains comprised the following 12 communes:

- Bains-les-Bains
- Fontenoy-le-Château
- Grandrupt-de-Bains
- Gruey-lès-Surance
- Harsault
- Hautmougey
- La Haye
- Le Magny
- Montmotier
- Trémonzey
- Vioménil
- Les Voivres
