= Communauté de communes de la Vôge vers les Rives de la Moselle =

The Communauté de communes de la Vôge vers les Rives de la Moselle (before 2008: Communauté de communes Les Deux Rives de la Moselle) is a former administrative association of rural communes in the Vosges département of eastern France and in the region of Lorraine. It was created in January 2000 and had its administrative offices at Arches. It was merged into the Communauté d'agglomération d'Épinal in January 2017.

The association took its name from the Vôge Plateau and the river Moselle.

== Composition ==
The Communauté de communes comprised the following communes:

1. Arches
2. Archettes
3. La Baffe
4. Bellefontaine
5. Dinozé
6. Hadol
7. Jarménil
8. Pouxeux
9. Raon-aux-Bois
10. Uriménil
11. Xertigny
