= Plombières (disambiguation) =

Plombières may refer to:

- Plombières, a municipality of Belgium
- Plombières-les-Bains, Vosges, France (site of the Treaty of Plombières)
- Plombières-lès-Dijon, Côte-d'Or, France
- Plombières (dessert), a French ice cream dish
