= Canton of Plombières-les-Bains =

Coordinates: 47°57′54″N 6°29′12″E

Plombières-les-Bains
- Former canton
- Interactive map of Plombières-les-Bains
- Country: France
- Region: Grand Est
- Department: Vosges
- No. of communes: {{{nbcomm}}}
- Disbanded: 2015
- Area: 156.31 km^{2} (60.35 sq mi)
- Population (2012): 7,080
  - Density: 45.3/km^{2} (117/sq mi)

The Canton of Plombières-les-Bains is a French former administrative and electoral grouping of communes in the Vosges département of eastern France and in the region of Lorraine. It was disbanded following the French canton reorganisation which came into effect in March 2015. It consisted of 4 communes, which joined the canton of Le Val-d'Ajol in 2015. It had 7,080 inhabitants (2012).

One of 13 cantons in the Arrondissement of Épinal, the Canton of Plombières-les-Bains had its administrative centre at Plombières-les-Bains.

== Composition ==
The Canton of Plombières-les-Bains comprised the following 4 communes:

- Bellefontaine
- Girmont-Val-d'Ajol
- Plombières-les-Bains
- Le Val-d'Ajol
