= Arboretum de la Hutte =

Arboretum in Grand Est, France

Coordinates: 48.03°N 6.033°E

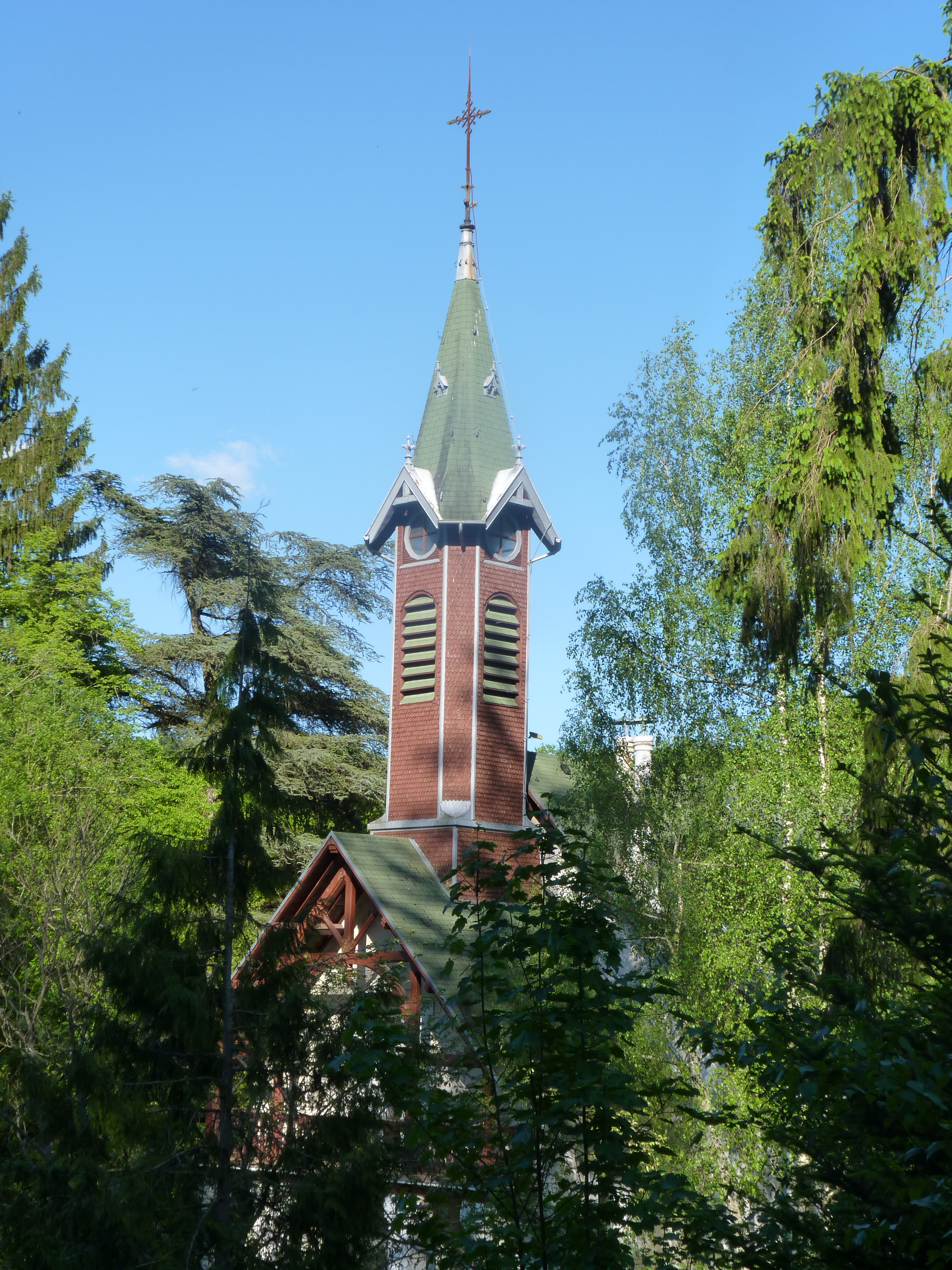
La Hutte Chapel - Vallée de l'Ourche

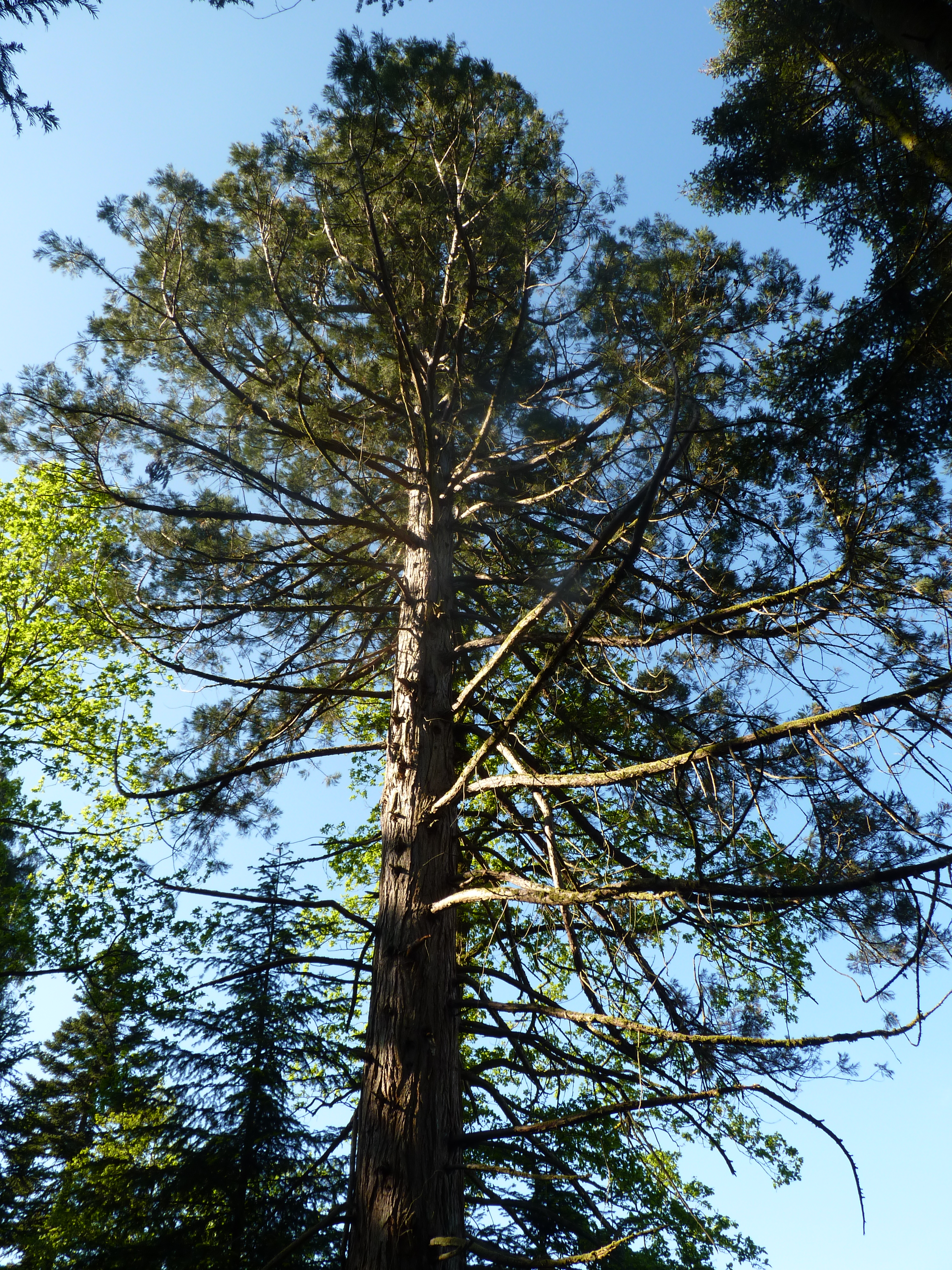
Giant sequoia

The Arboretum de La Hutte (3 hectares) is an arboretum located in the Vallée de l'Ourche, variously described as within the towns of Darney or Hennezel, Vosges, Grand Est, France. It is open daily without charge. The Ourche river flows across Darney forest to join the Saône. One century ago Vallée de l'Ourche was an industrial country with forges, sawmills and glass factories. Only one glass factory still operates near the valley (La Rochére glass factory).

La Hutte Chapel, near the arboretum, was built at the end of 19th century in Swiss style.

The arboretum was created circa 1874 by forge-master Alfred Irrois, and contains mature specimens of Liriodendron tulipifera, Quercus rubra, Sequoiadendron, and Thujopsis dolabrata. It is now in some disrepair, but as of 2007 it was proposed that the Office National des Forêts (ONF) take responsibility for its rehabilitation. Just try to encircle the trunk of a giant Sequoia and try to find the hidden huge Douglas !

== See also ==
- List of botanical gardens in France
