= Ourche =

Coordinates: 48.0453°N 6.0192°E

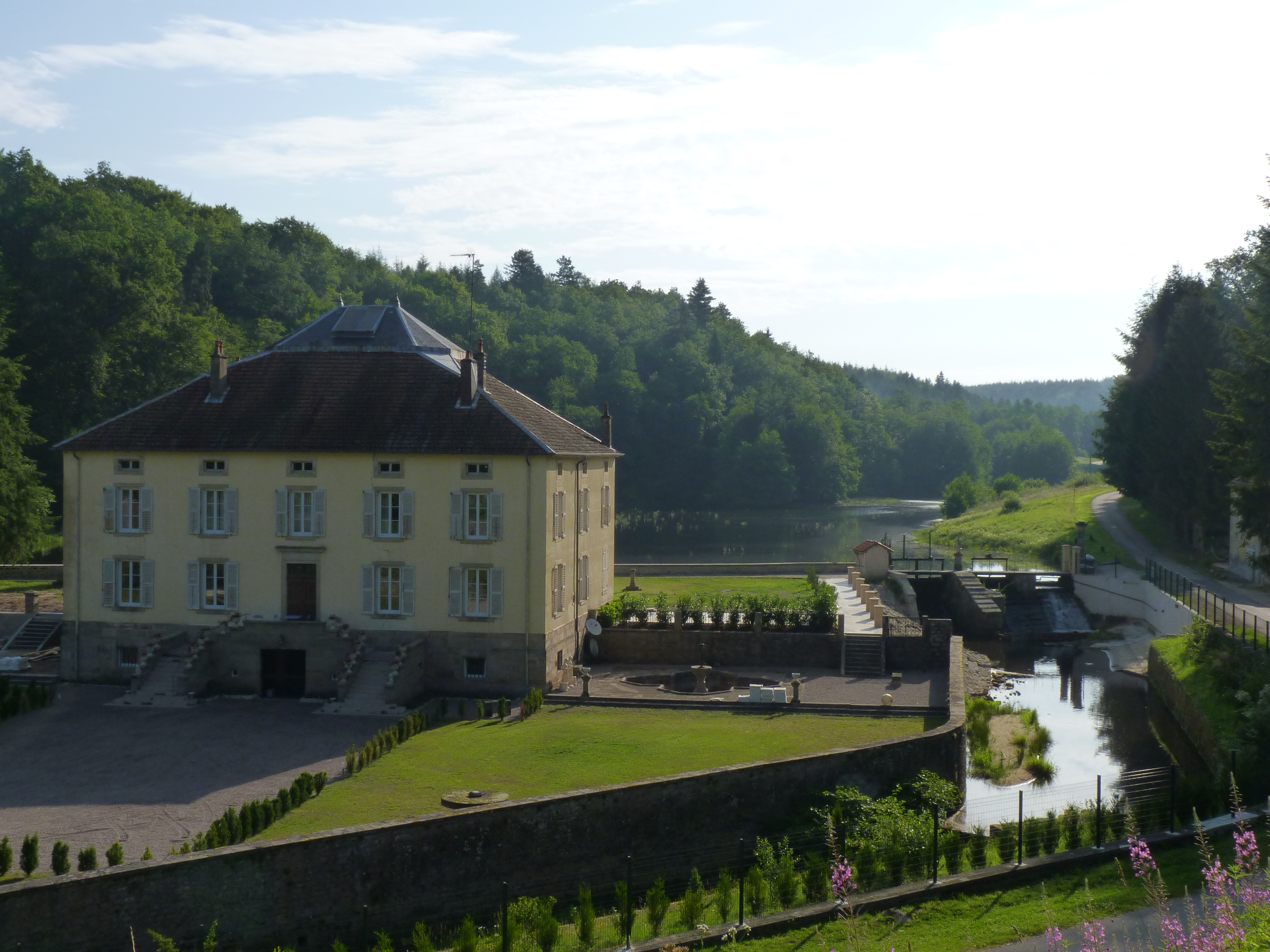

- Location within France Location within Grand Est

Location
- Country: France

Physical characteristics
- Source
  - location: La Groseillére, Gruey-lès-Surance
- Mouth
  - location: Saône
- Length: 13.3 km (8.3 mi)

Basin features
- Progression: Saône→ Rhône→ Mediterranean Sea

The Ourche is a river in the eastern France, a left tributary of the Saône. It is 13.3 km (8.3 mi) long.

== Geography ==
The Ourche flows entirely within the Vosges. It is the first notable tributary of the Saône, rising at the lieu dit of La Groseillére at Gruey-lès-Surance. It flows slowly through the forest of Darney, crossing the communes of Hennezel and Claudon, separating the latter in the north from its neighbour of Attigny.

The Ourche is fed by four small rivers: Orgoneaux, Thiétry, Houdrie and Noires Gouttes. The bed is made of sandstone which was deposited in the Paleozoic Era. The course of the Ourche is punctuated by numerous ponds and reservoirs, witnesses to the industrial exploitation of water power. Today this power is still used by hydroelectric microstations.
