= Raon-aux-Bois =

- Commune
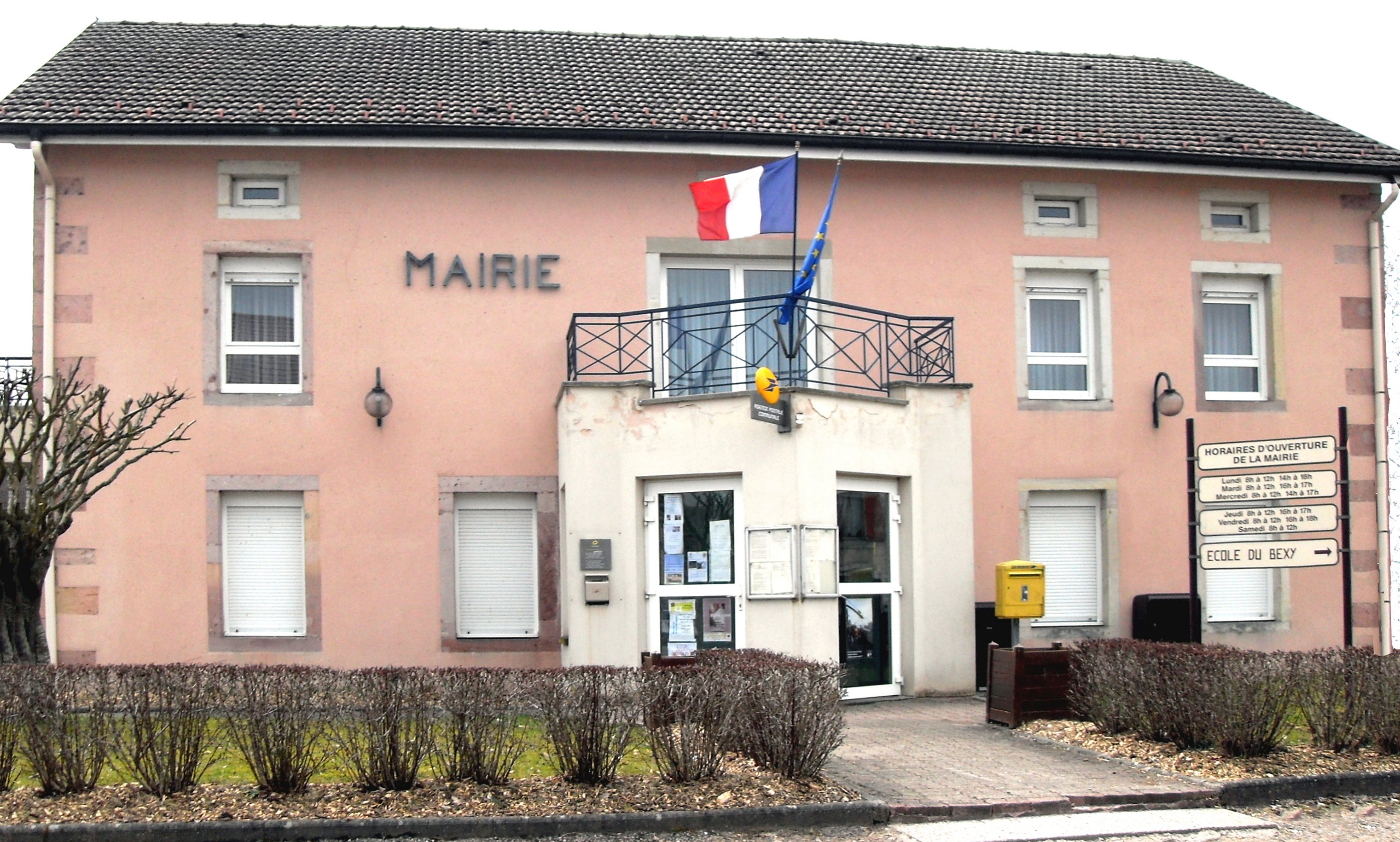
- The town hall in Raon-aux-Bois

- Coat of arms
- Location of Raon-aux-Bois
- Location within France Location within Grand Est
- Coordinates: 48°03′26″N 6°31′18″E
- Country: France
- Region: Grand Est
- Department: Vosges
- Arrondissement: Épinal
- Canton: Remiremont
- Intercommunality: CA Épinal

Government
  - Mayor (2020–2026): Christian Vitu
- Area^{1}: 24.05 km^{2} (9.29 sq mi)
- Highest elevation: 591 m (1,939 ft)
- Lowest elevation: 385 m (1,263 ft)
- Population (2023): 1,202
  - Density: 49.98/km^{2} (129.4/sq mi)
- Time zone: UTC+01:00 (CET)
  - Summer (DST): UTC+02:00 (CEST)
- INSEE/Postal code: 88371 /88220
- ^{1} French Land Register data, which excludes lakes, ponds, glaciers > 1 km^{2} (0.386 sq mi or 247 acres) and river estuaries.

Raon-aux-Bois (French pronunciation: [ʁaɔ̃ o bwa]) is a commune in the Vosges department in Grand Est in northeastern France.

Inhabitants are called Raonnais in French.

== Geography ==
Raon-aux-Bois is positioned in the district known as the Vôge Plateau, on the western edge of the Vosges Mountains. As the name of the commune implies, the district has retained its woodland countryside, with traditional mature timberland in the south and conifer plantations to the north.

A small river, the Niche, crosses the centre of the village on the way to Arches where it joins up with the Moselle. The river's source is in the Forest of Humont to the south.

The word 'Raon' is believed to share the same root as the English word 'ravine', and to indicate, in this instance, the confluence of several streams; here the Champée, the Prés Roussel and the Racine all feed into the Niche.

== History ==
The earliest traces of human activity date back only to the late Middle Ages, suggesting that throughout and beyond the first millennium the thick forest of this part of Lorraine were left to nature.

Deuring the fifteenth and sixteenth centuries, there are records of people from Raon repopulating the neighbouring village of Bellefontaine, which had been abandoned a century or so earlier, probably as a result of plague.

There are few surviving records of Raon from its early centuries, but it is believed to have been controlled at various times by one of three lordships, while on the ecclesiastical side the church, dedicated to Amé de Remiremont, fell within the Diocese of Saint-Dié in the deanery of Remiremont.

In 1790 the village was placed within the canton of Éloyes, an arrangement which lasted virtually ten years. The present administrative structure is based on dispositions effected in 1800.

During the nineteenth century and well into the first part of the twentieth century, the village experienced a steady prosperity based on the spinning and starching industries.

== Personalities ==
Julien Absalon, a mountain biker born in 1980 at nearby Remiremont, grew up at Raon-aux-Bois.

== See also ==
- Communes of the Vosges department
