= Arboretum de Bains-les-Bains =

Historic arboretum in Grand Est, France

Coordinates: 47.999°N 6.233°E

The Arboretum de Bains-les-Bains (2 hectares) is a historic arboretum located along the Canal de l'Est in the Parc de la Manufacture Royale de Fer blanc (established 1733), Bains-les-Bains, Vosges, Grand Est, France.

The arboretum is over 250 years old, and contains remarkable specimens of Castanea sativa, the rare Fagus sylvatica 'Tortuosa', Ginkgo biloba, Lawson cypress, and Sciadopitys verticillata, as well as American oak, cedar, Magnolia stellata, and Rhododendron ponticum. This site was also the location of Julie-Victoire Daubié's herbarium.

== See also ==
- List of botanical gardens in France
