= Darney =

- Commune
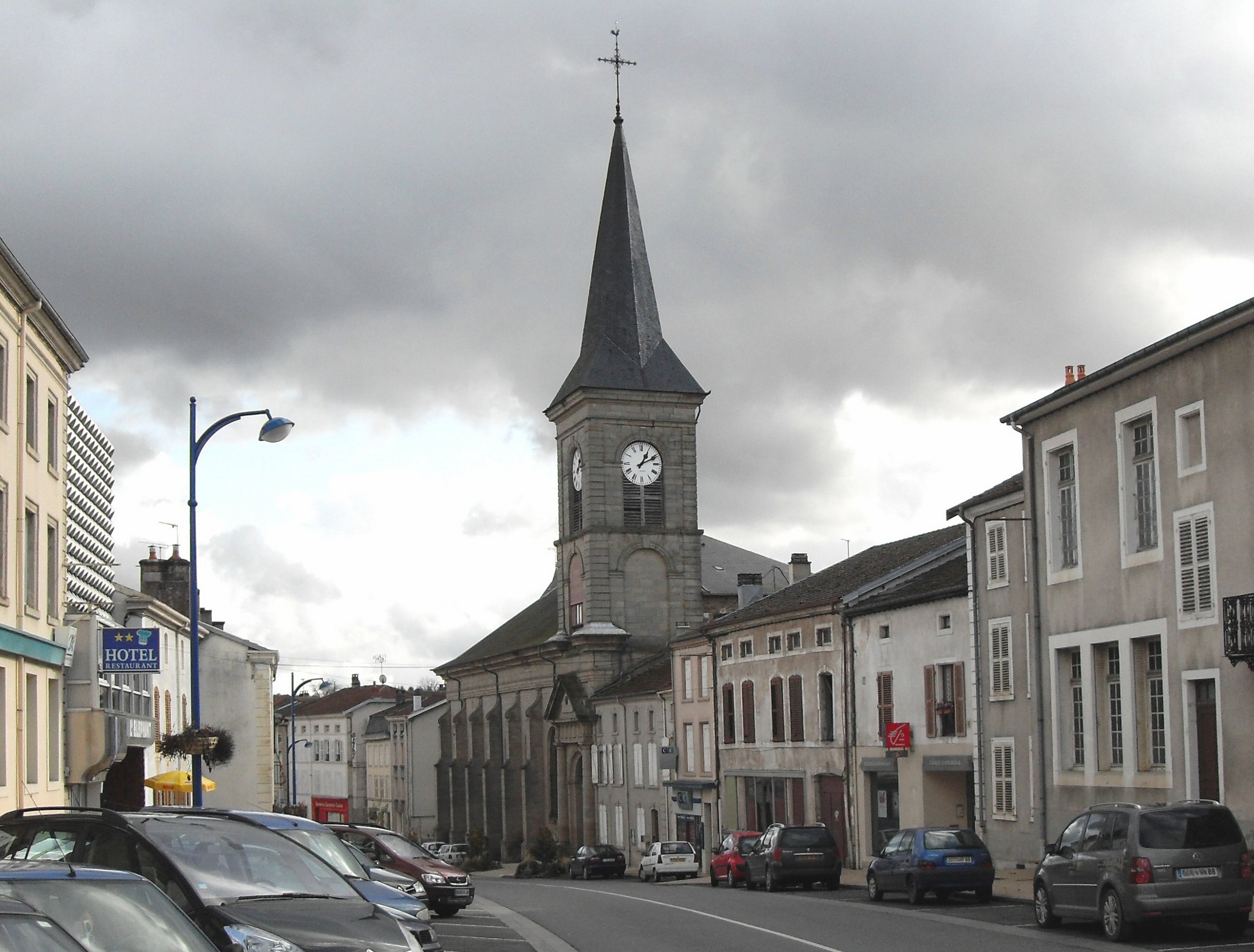
- Center of the town

- Coat of arms
- Location of Darney
- Location within France Location within Grand Est
- Coordinates: 48°05′09″N 6°02′48″E
- Country: France
- Region: Grand Est
- Department: Vosges
- Arrondissement: Neufchâteau
- Canton: Darney
- Intercommunality: CC Vosges côté Sud-Ouest

Government
  - Mayor (2020–2026): Yves Desvernes
- Area^{1}: 7.92 km^{2} (3.06 sq mi)
- Population (2023): 1,091
  - Density: 138/km^{2} (357/sq mi)
- Time zone: UTC+01:00 (CET)
  - Summer (DST): UTC+02:00 (CEST)
- INSEE/Postal code: 88124 /88260
- ^{1} French Land Register data, which excludes lakes, ponds, glaciers > 1 km^{2} (0.386 sq mi or 247 acres) and river estuaries.

Darney (French pronunciation: [daʁnɛ]) is a commune in the Vosges department in Grand Est in northeastern France.

It is located in the Vôge Plateau, around the location of the source of the river Saône. Darney is known for its forest of oak and beech trees.

== History ==
Darney is built on a promontory dominating the valley of the Saône. The Romans built a castle here to control the area, and watch the forested countryside. As a fortified town in the Middle Ages, Darney had towers and two fortified gates, and was known as the "city of thirty towers". Theobald II, Duke of Lorraine gave the town its church in 1308. The town suffered during the Thirty years war, being razed by the Swedes led by Bernard of Saxe-Weimar, who were allies of the French, in 1634. The castle of the time was destroyed in 1639. Remnants of this castle still exist, as well as the current, smaller castle, which was built in 1725.

During the First World War, Darney was the rallying point for Czech and Slovak volunteers, where they were stationed at Camp Kleber. Due to their presence, on 30 June 1918, Czechoslovak independence was proclaimed in the village. The French President, Raymond Poincaré inspected 6,000 Czech and Slovak legionnaires, before handing over the Czechoslovak Army flag to Edvard Beneš, Minister of the Interior and of Foreign Affairs within the Provisional Czechoslovak government. This flag became the flag of the 21st rifle regiment.

The former town hall is now a Franco-Czechoslovak museum, dedicated to Camp Kleber, the Czechoslovak troops stationed there, and the birth of the Czechoslovak state.

== Twin towns – sister cities ==
Darney is twinned with:

- Slavkov u Brna, Czech Republic

== Points of interest ==
- Arboretum de la Hutte

Darney forest and wilderness assets of Ourche Valley: Oak trees, roe deer, red deer, wild cats. The Ourche river. Scenic views at La Hutte with a pond and lakes, the old chapel and the giant trees of the Arboretum. Scenic views at Abbaye de Droiteval.

== Notable people ==
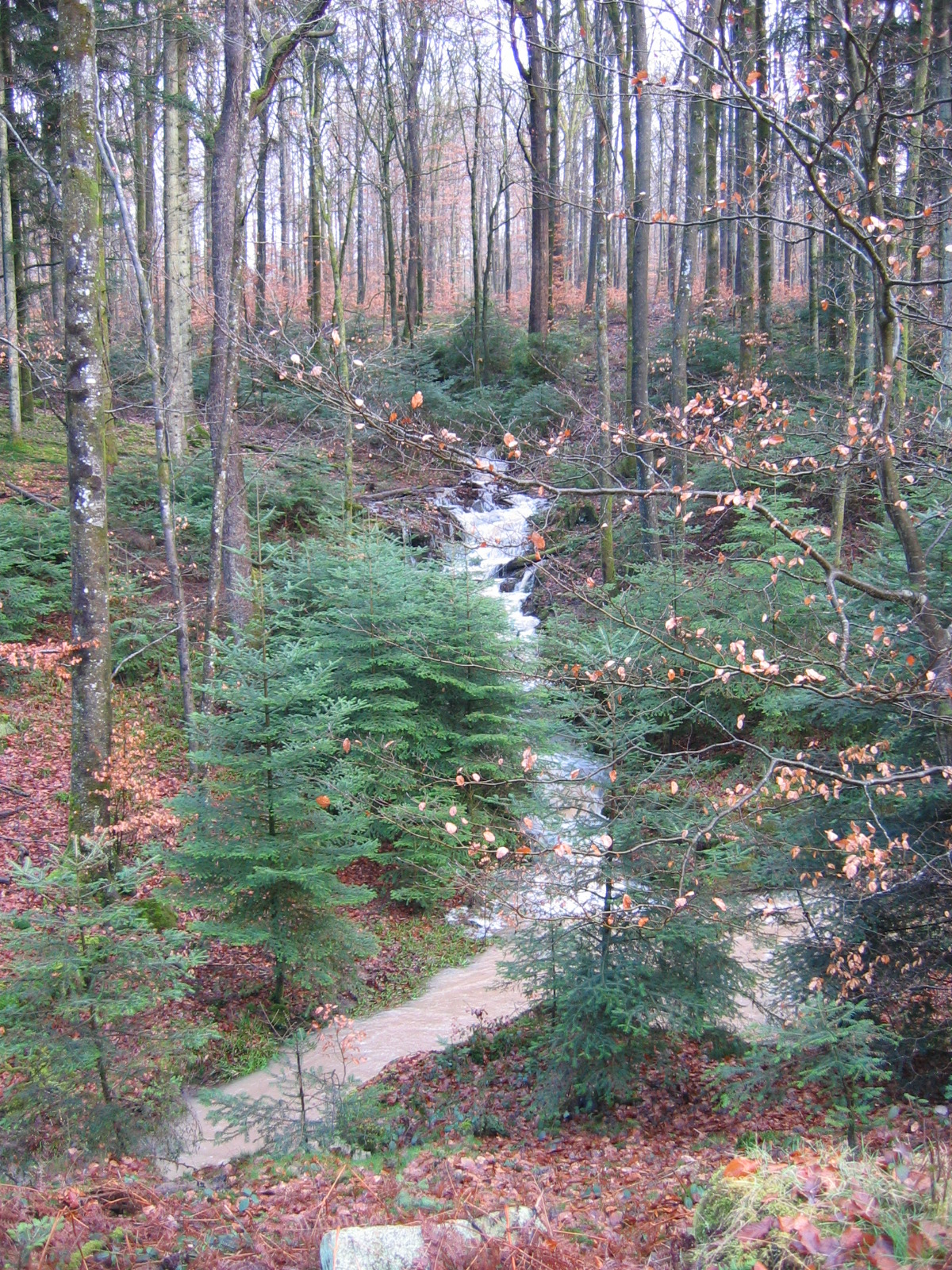
Darney forest

- Antoine Argoud
- Nicolas-Sylvestre Bergier
- Xavier Breton
- Louis Morizot

== See also ==
- Communes of the Vosges department
