= Plombir =

Type of Russian ice cream

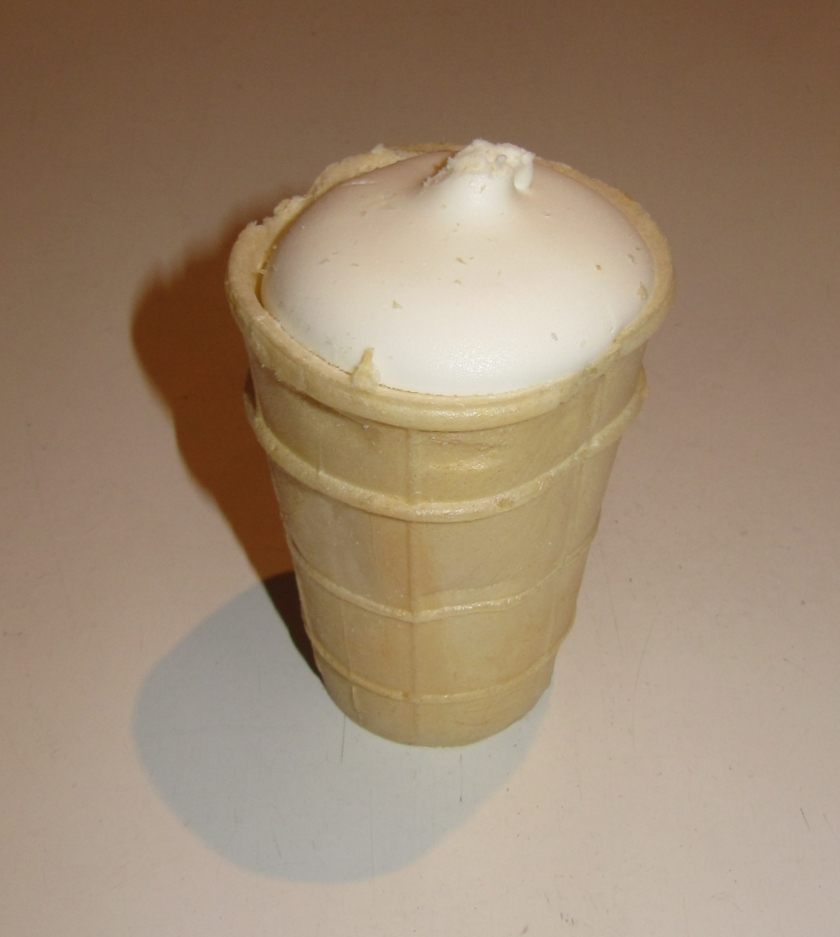
- Course: Dessert
- Region or state: Soviet Union
- Invented: 1937
- Main ingredients: cream; sugar; egg yolks; vanilla

Plombir is a type of ice cream made with vanilla, cream, eggs and sugar, originally created in the Soviet Union in 1937. Soviet — and now Russian — state standards require natural ingredients and specific levels of fat and sugar content.

== History ==
The name "plombir" descends from the French dessert plombières, a vanilla ice cream mixed with candied fruit soaked in kirsch.

In 1936, Joseph Stalin sent Anastas Mikoyan, People's Commissar of the Food Industry, on a business trip to the United States to study and adapt American food production. In addition to purchasing food equipment, Mikoyan brought many food recipes from the United States, one of which was ice cream. On November 4, 1937, the first plombir was produced in Moscow using American equipment and given a Frenchified name.

During the 1930s, the state standardized production, and it remained this way until the collapse of the USSR. In the 1990s, Russia started importing foreign brands of ice cream, and the state standards were dropped.

== Standards ==
The standards for plombir are specified with GOST 31457-2012. Plombir made in accordance with GOST must meet the following requirements:

- fat content must be between 12% and 20%
- sugar content must be 14% or higher
- amount of solid ingredients must exceed 37-42%, depending on fat content

== See also ==
- Frozen custard
- Gelato
- Ice cream
- Soviet cuisine
