= La Vôge-les-Bains =

- Commune
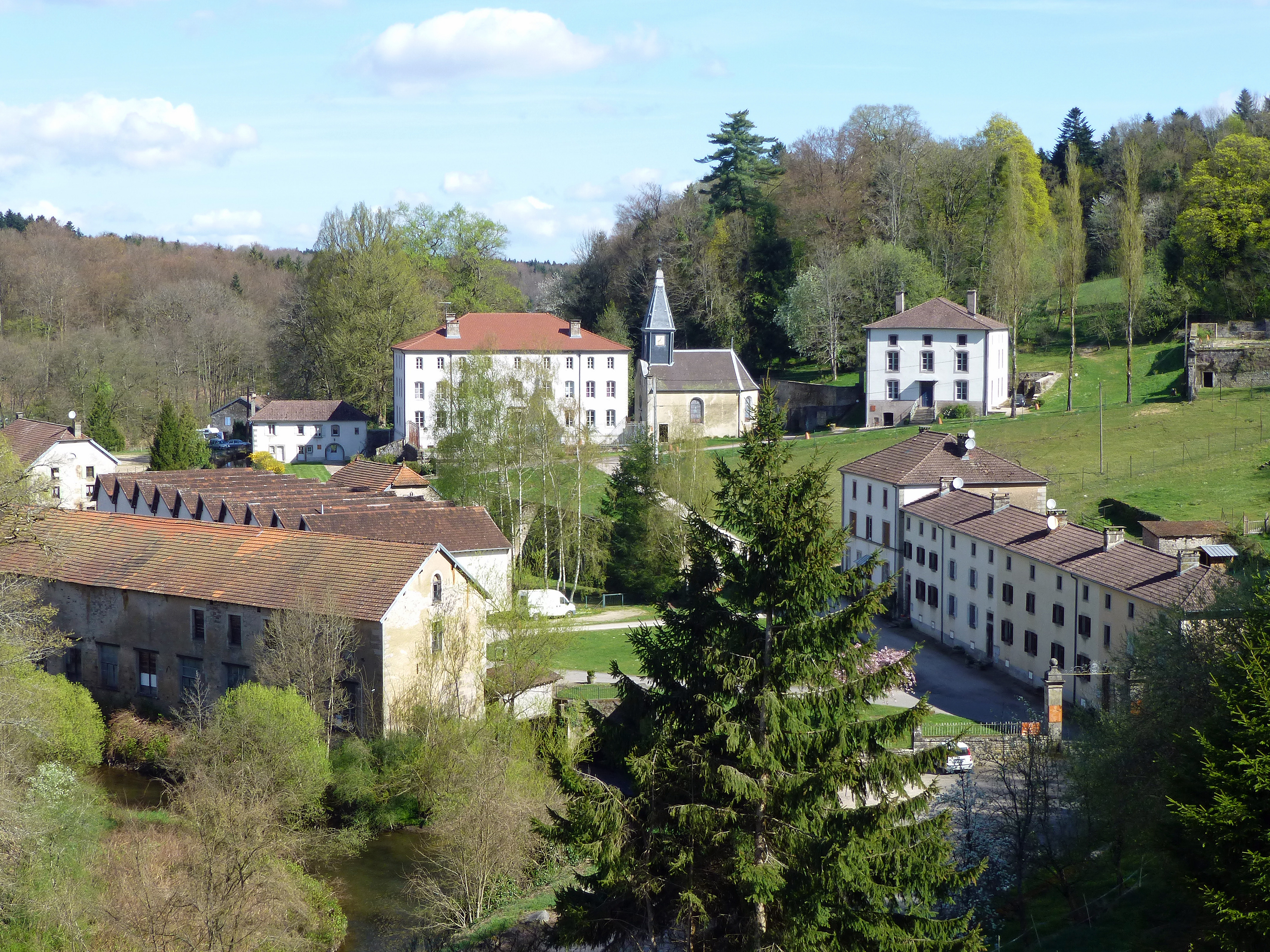
- A general view of La Vôge-les-Bains
- Location of La Vôge-les-Bains
- Location within France Location within Grand Est
- Coordinates: 48°00′11″N 6°15′50″E
- Country: France
- Region: Grand Est
- Department: Vosges
- Arrondissement: Épinal
- Canton: Le Val-d'Ajol
- Intercommunality: CA Épinal

Government
  - Mayor (2020–2026): Frédéric Drevet
- Area^{1}: 44.09 km^{2} (17.02 sq mi)
- Population (2023): 1,545
  - Density: 35.04/km^{2} (90.76/sq mi)
- Time zone: UTC+01:00 (CET)
  - Summer (DST): UTC+02:00 (CEST)
- INSEE/Postal code: 88029 /88240
- ^{1} French Land Register data, which excludes lakes, ponds, glaciers > 1 km^{2} (0.386 sq mi or 247 acres) and river estuaries.

La Vôge-les-Bains (French pronunciation: [la voʒ le bɛ̃]) is a commune in the department of Vosges, eastern France. The municipality was established on 1 January 2017 by merger of the former communes of Bains-les-Bains (the seat), Harsault and Hautmougey.

== See also ==
- Communes of the Vosges department
