= Harsault =

- Part of La Vôge-les-Bains
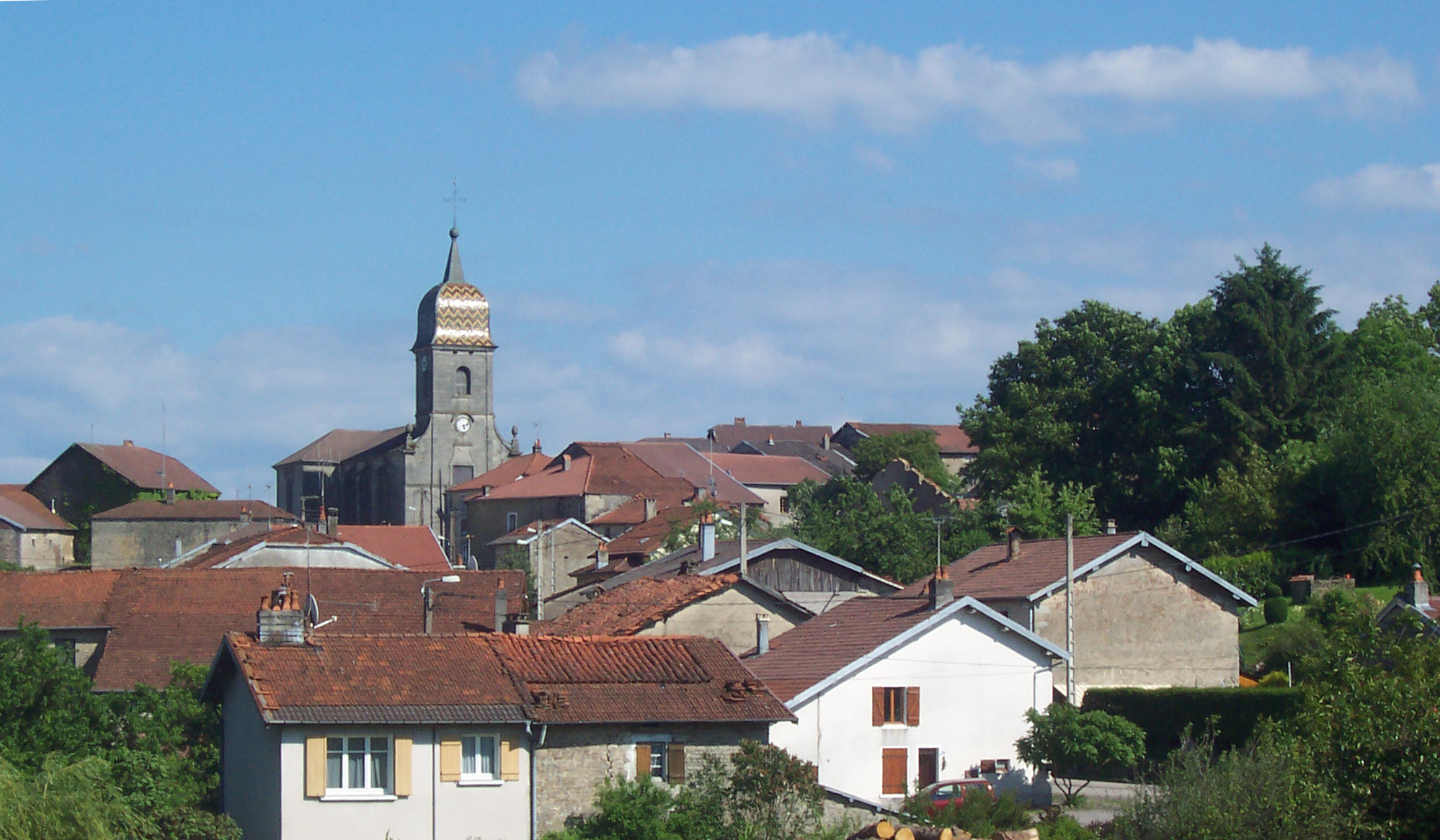
- A general view of Harsault
- Location of Harsault
- Location within France Location within Grand Est
- Coordinates: 48°03′27″N 6°14′19″E
- Country: France
- Region: Grand Est
- Department: Vosges
- Arrondissement: Épinal
- Canton: Le Val-d'Ajol
- Commune: La Vôge-les-Bains
- Area^{1}: 10.85 km^{2} (4.19 sq mi)
- Elevation: 380 m (1,250 ft)
- Highest elevation: 443 m (1,453 ft)
- Lowest elevation: 282 m (925 ft)
- Population (2022): 318
  - Density: 29.3/km^{2} (75.9/sq mi)
- Time zone: UTC+01:00 (CET)
  - Summer (DST): UTC+02:00 (CEST)
- Postal code: 88240
- ^{1} French Land Register data, which excludes lakes, ponds, glaciers > 1 km^{2} (0.386 sq mi or 247 acres) and river estuaries.

Harsault (French pronunciation: [aʁso]) is a former commune in the Vosges department in Grand Est in northeastern France. On 1 January 2017, it was merged into the new commune La Vôge-les-Bains.

== Geography ==
The Côney formed most of the commune's eastern border.

== See also ==
- Communes of the Vosges department
