= Plombières (dessert) =

Style of ice cream

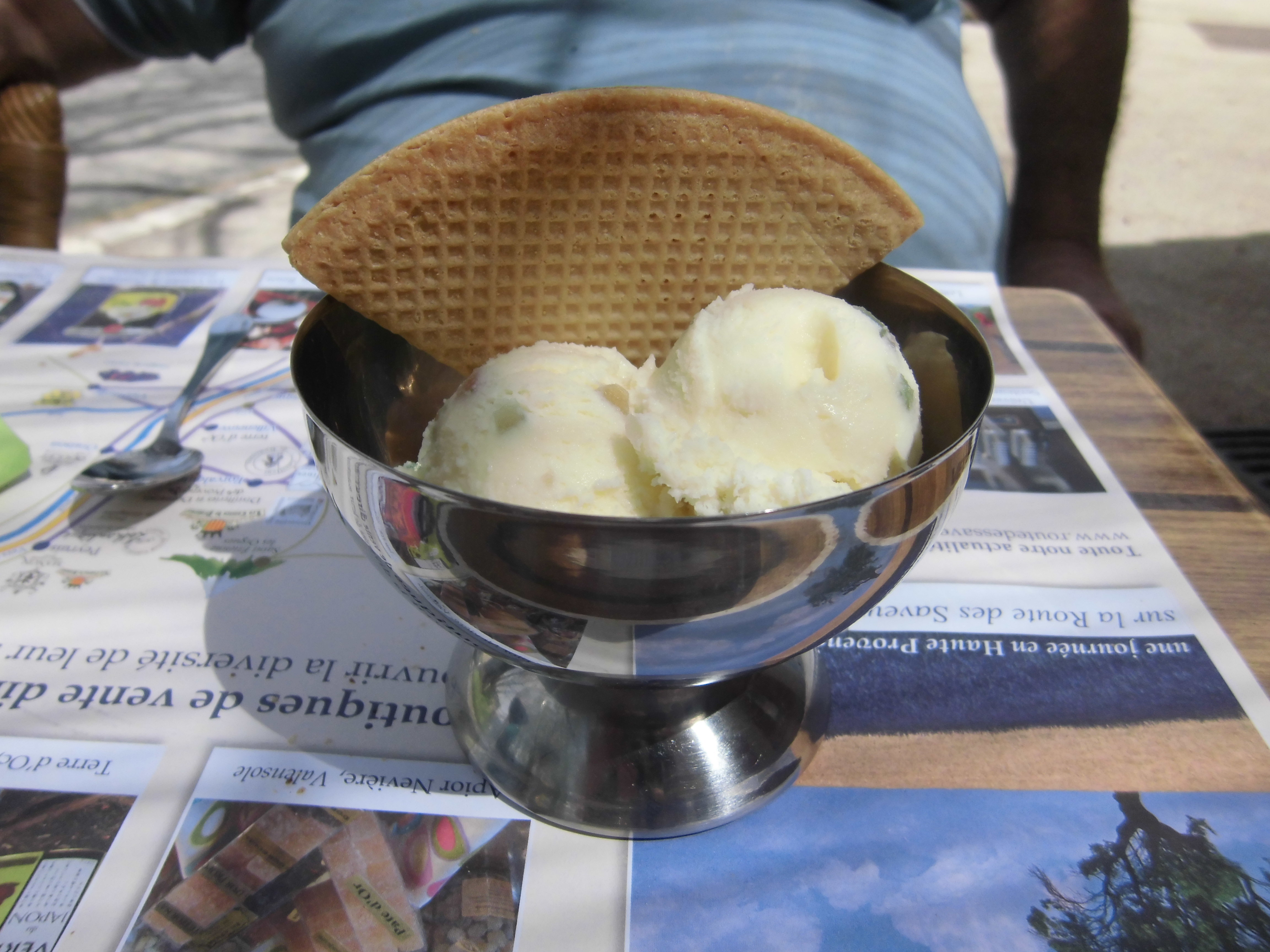
A bowl of plombières ice cream with a waffle

Plombières is a type of French ice cream made with almond extract, kirsch, and candied fruit.

== History ==
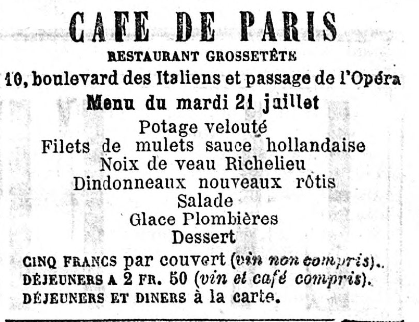
Menu of the Café de Paris mentioning plombières ice cream (21 July 1868)

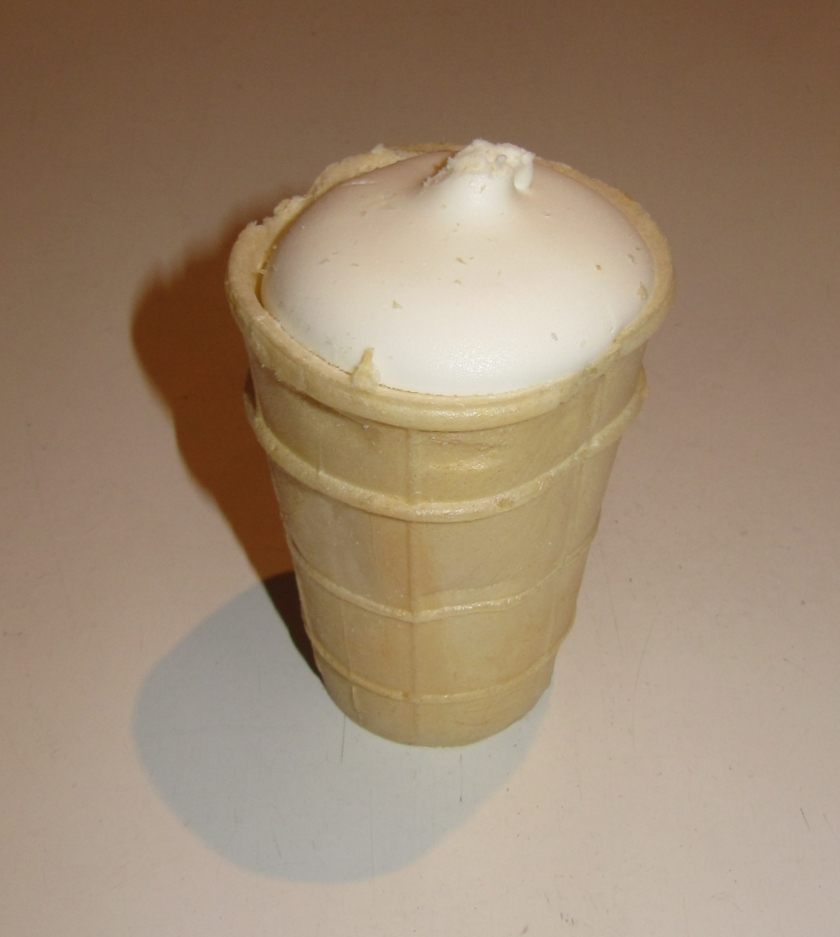
Plombir, a similar dish served in post-Soviet states

The origin of plombières ice cream is disputed. It is unclear whether its name refers to the commune of Plombières-les-Bains. A folk etymology suggests that the dish was first served to Napoleon III at the signing of the Treaty of Plombières in 1858; but Marie-Antoine Carême provided a recipe for "plombière cream" in his 1815 book, Pâtissier royal parisien. Similar recipes can be found in other French cookbooks from the 19th century.

According to Pierre Lacam in 1893, "plombière cream" takes its name from a utensil used to make it. A similar etymological theory was proposed by Joseph Favre in his book Dictionnaire universel de cuisine, which says that "plombière is a synonym for bombe, which is used to grind the ingredients of the dish". Other scholars have suggested that the dessert takes its name from the mold in which the cream is pressed.

Plombières ice cream is mentioned in Splendeurs et misères des courtisanes, published in 1844 by Honoré de Balzac.

Plombières should not be confused with Malaga ice cream, a vanilla ice cream served with dried raisins soaked in Malaga wine or rum.

In the Soviet Union, plombir (Russian: пломбир) became a popular dish that is still seen in post-Soviet states.

== See also ==
- Tutti frutti
