= Vioménil =

- Commune
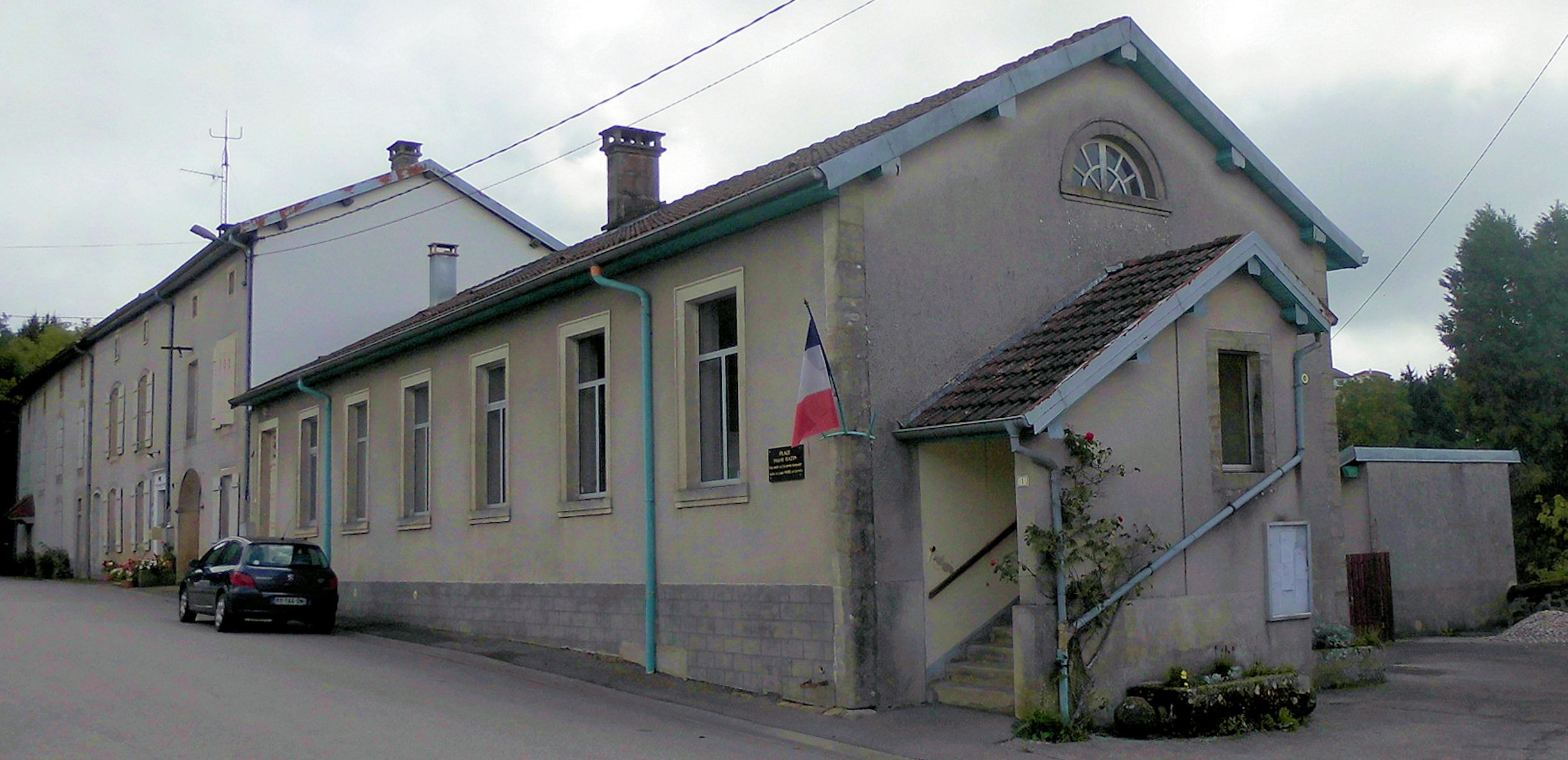
- The town hall in Vioménil

- Coat of arms
- Location of Vioménil
- Location within France Location within Grand Est
- Coordinates: 48°05′40″N 6°10′55″E
- Country: France
- Region: Grand Est
- Department: Vosges
- Arrondissement: Neufchâteau
- Canton: Le Val-d'Ajol
- Intercommunality: CC Vosges côté Sud-Ouest

Government
  - Mayor (2020–2026): Sylvain Fransot
- Area^{1}: 23.59 km^{2} (9.11 sq mi)
- Highest elevation: 467 m (1,532 ft)
- Lowest elevation: 290 m (950 ft)
- Population (2023): 153
  - Density: 6.49/km^{2} (16.8/sq mi)
- Time zone: UTC+01:00 (CET)
  - Summer (DST): UTC+02:00 (CEST)
- INSEE/Postal code: 88515 /88260
- ^{1} French Land Register data, which excludes lakes, ponds, glaciers > 1 km^{2} (0.386 sq mi or 247 acres) and river estuaries.

Vioménil (French pronunciation: [vjɔmenil]) is a commune in the Vosges department in Grand Est in northeastern France.

Inhabitants are known as Viamanciliens, after the Roman name of the commune, Viamansalis.

== Geography ==
The rivers Saône and Madon have their source in the commune. The European Watershed goes through Vioménil.

== Personalities ==
The writer Hervé Bazin spent most of his youth here.

== See also ==
- Communes of the Vosges department
