= Hadol, Vosges =

Hadol
- Commune
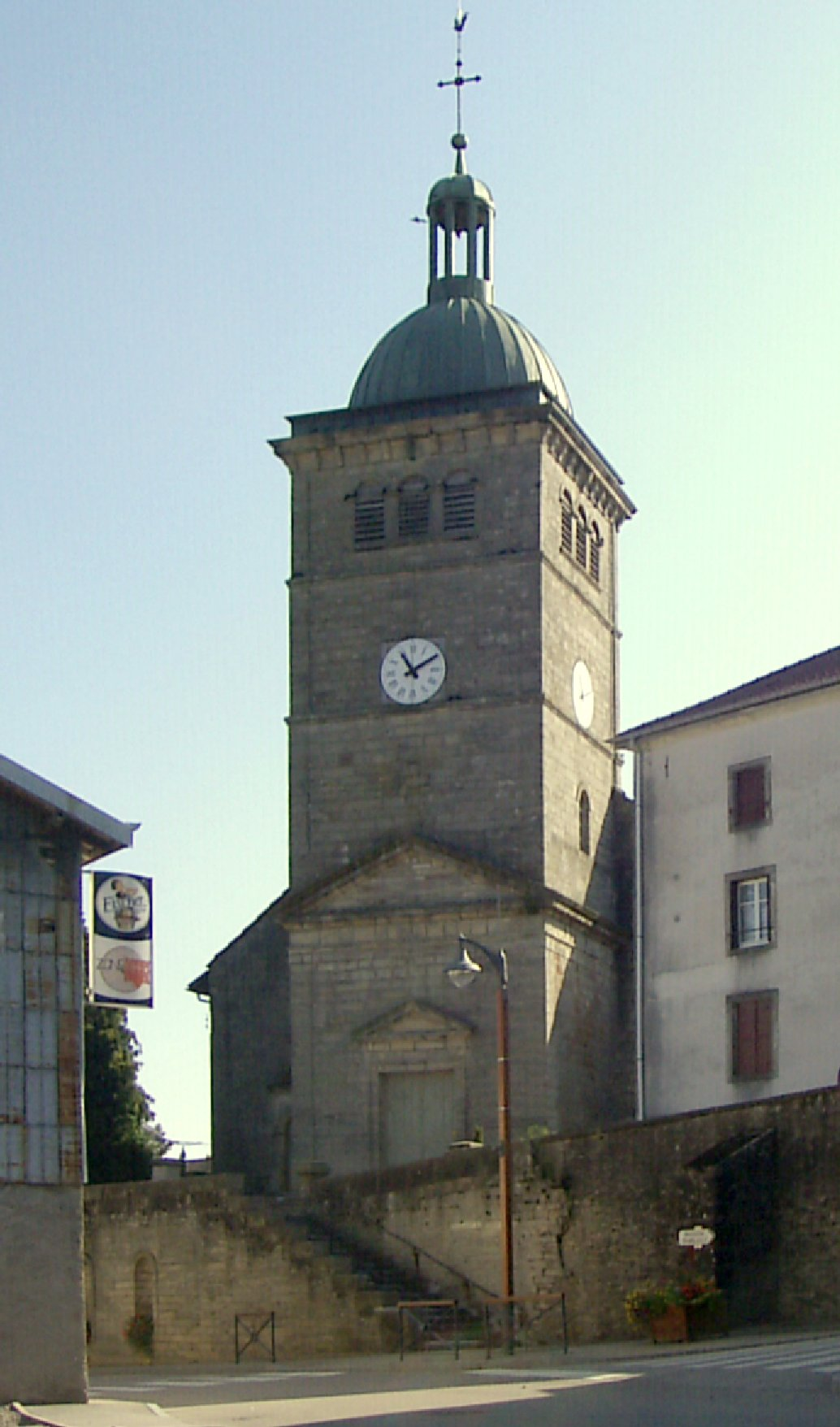
- Church of Saint-Gengoult

- Coat of arms
- Location of Hadol
- Location within France Location within Grand Est
- Coordinates: 48°05′31″N 6°28′45″E
- Country: France
- Region: Grand Est
- Department: Vosges
- Arrondissement: Épinal
- Canton: Le Val-d'Ajol
- Intercommunality: Épinal

Government
  - Mayor (2020–2026): Jean-François Clasquin
- Area^{1}: 49.05 km^{2} (18.94 sq mi)
- Elevation: 500 m (1,600 ft)
- Highest elevation: 586 m (1,923 ft)
- Lowest elevation: 340 m (1,120 ft)
- Population (2023): 2,311
  - Density: 47.12/km^{2} (122.0/sq mi)
- Time zone: UTC+01:00 (CET)
  - Summer (DST): UTC+02:00 (CEST)
- INSEE/Postal code: 88225 /88220
- ^{1} French Land Register data, which excludes lakes, ponds, glaciers > 1 km^{2} (0.386 sq mi or 247 acres) and river estuaries.

Hadol (French pronunciation: [adɔl]) is a commune in the Vosges department in Grand Est in northeastern France.

== Population ==
Historical population
Year	Pop.	±% p.a.
1968	1,503	—
1975	1,580	+0.72%
1982	1,997	+3.40%
1990	2,019	+0.14%
1999	2,071	+0.28%
2007	2,231	+0.93%
2012	2,327	+0.85%
2017	2,368	+0.35%
2023	2,311	−0.41%
Source: INSEE

== See also ==
- Communes of the Vosges department
