= Bains-les-Bains =

- Part of La Vôge-les-Bains
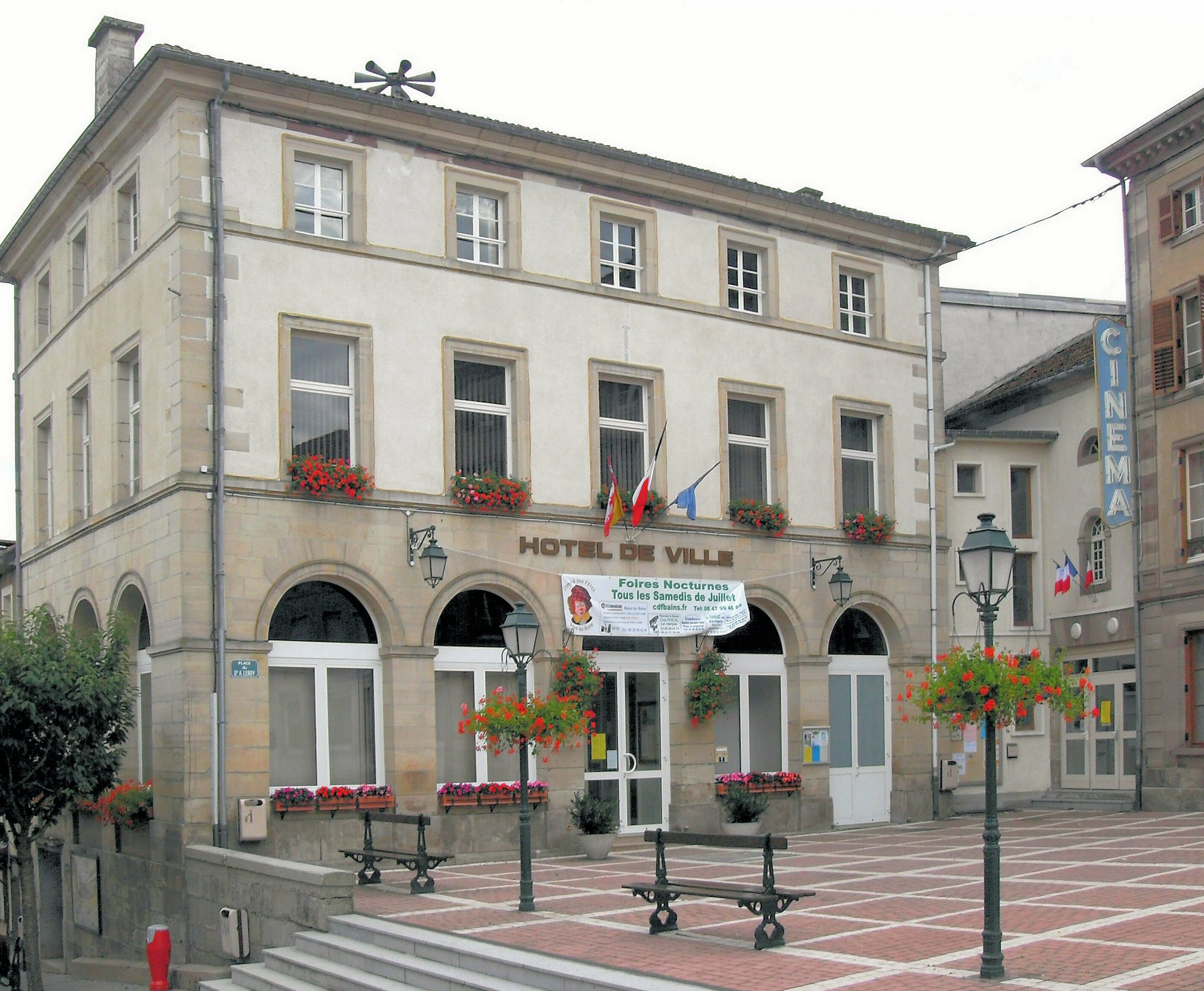
- Town hall

- Flag Coat of arms
- Location of Bains-les-Bains
- Location within France Location within Grand Est
- Coordinates: 48°00′11″N 6°15′51″E
- Country: France
- Region: Grand Est
- Department: Vosges
- Arrondissement: Épinal
- Canton: Le Val-d'Ajol
- Commune: La Vôge-les-Bains
- Area^{1}: 25.37 km^{2} (9.80 sq mi)
- Elevation: 325 m (1,066 ft)
- Highest elevation: 417 m (1,368 ft)
- Lowest elevation: 256 m (840 ft)
- Population (2022): 1,109
  - Density: 43.71/km^{2} (113.2/sq mi)
- Time zone: UTC+01:00 (CET)
  - Summer (DST): UTC+02:00 (CEST)
- Postal code: 88240
- ^{1} French Land Register data, which excludes lakes, ponds, glaciers > 1 km^{2} (0.386 sq mi or 247 acres) and river estuaries.

Bains-les-Bains (French pronunciation: [bɛ̃ le bɛ̃]) is a former commune in the Vosges department in Grand Est in eastern France. On 1 January 2017, it was merged into the new commune La Vôge-les-Bains. It was the administrative seat of the former Canton of Bains-les-Bains.

== Geography ==
The river Côney formed the commune's western border.

== Points of interest ==
- Arboretum de Bains-les-Bains
- Canal de l'Est

== See also ==
- Communes of the Vosges department
