= Hennezel =

- Commune
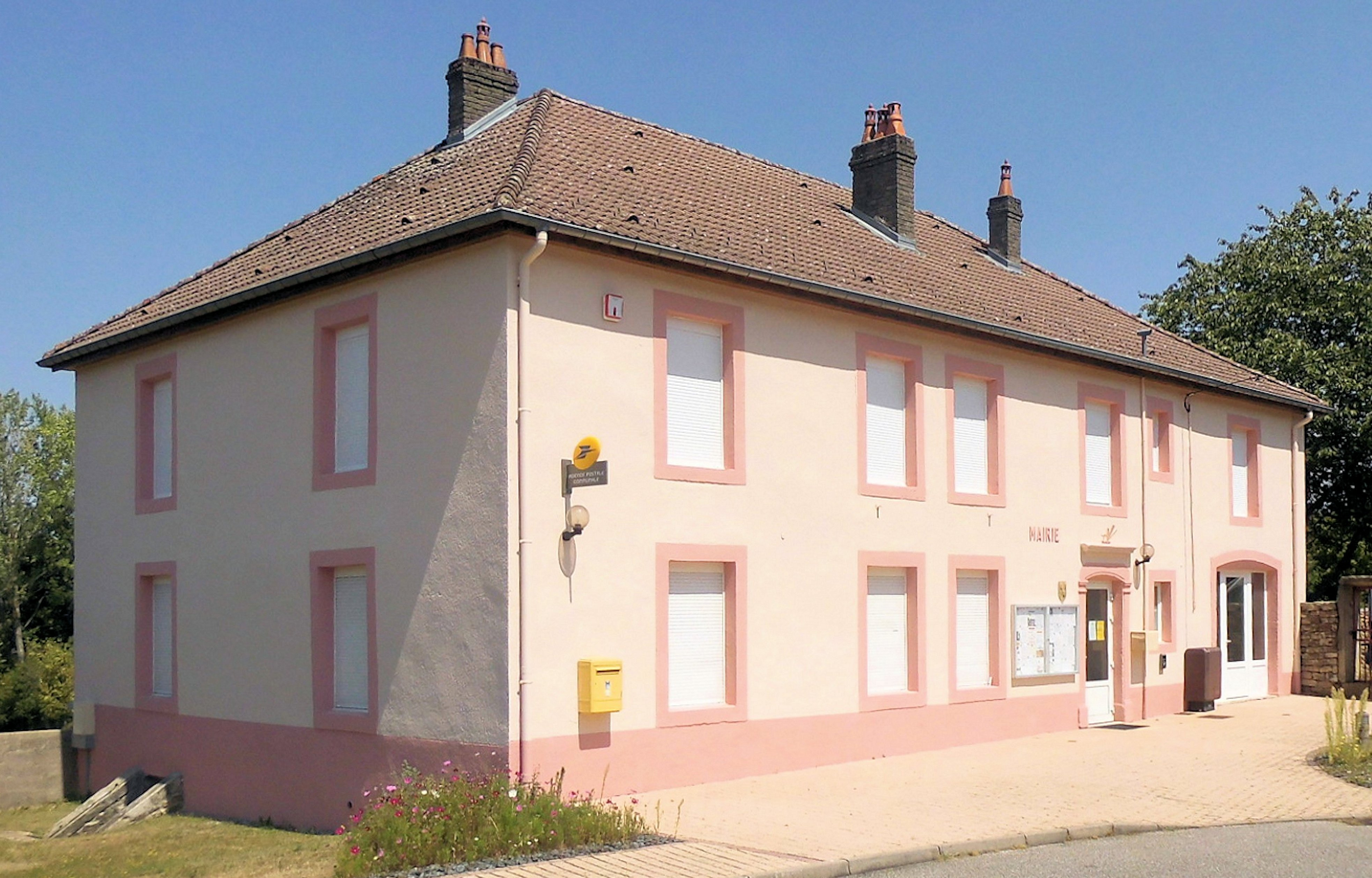
- The town hall in Hennezel

- Coat of arms
- Location of Hennezel
- Location within France Location within Grand Est
- Coordinates: 48°03′19″N 6°07′06″E
- Country: France
- Region: Grand Est
- Department: Vosges
- Arrondissement: Neufchâteau
- Canton: Darney
- Intercommunality: CC Vosges côté Sud-Ouest

Government
  - Mayor (2020–2026): Jean-Luc Bischoff
- Area^{1}: 32.13 km^{2} (12.41 sq mi)
- Elevation: 380 m (1,250 ft)
- Highest elevation: 468 m (1,535 ft)
- Lowest elevation: 272 m (892 ft)
- Population (2023): 386
  - Density: 12.0/km^{2} (31.1/sq mi)
- Time zone: UTC+01:00 (CET)
  - Summer (DST): UTC+02:00 (CEST)
- INSEE/Postal code: 88238 /88260
- ^{1} French Land Register data, which excludes lakes, ponds, glaciers > 1 km^{2} (0.386 sq mi or 247 acres) and river estuaries.

Hennezel (French pronunciation: [ɛnzɛl]) is a commune in the Vosges department in Grand Est in northeastern France.

Hennezel is located near the Vallée de l'Ourche, as well as other scenic attractions (La Hutte, Droiteval).

== Points of interest ==
- Arboretum de la Hutte

Fauna of Darney forest and Ourche Valley include roe deer, red deer and wild cats. Darney forest is known for its oak trees. Scenic views at La Hutte with peaceful pond and lakes, old chapel and of course the Giant trees of the Arboretum.

== See also ==
- Communes of the Vosges department
