= Le Clerjus =

- Commune
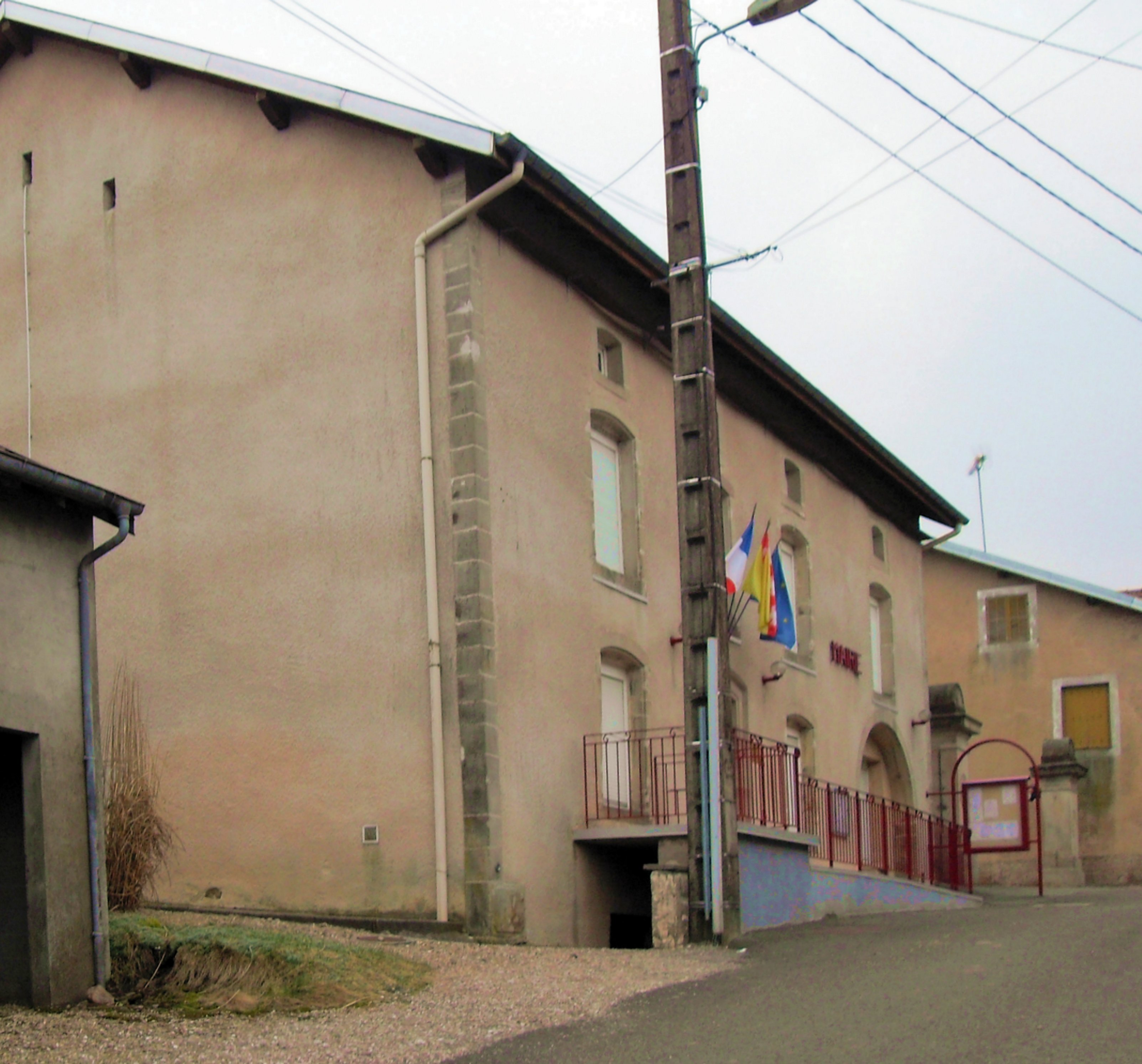
- The town hall in Le Clerjus

- Coat of arms
- Location of Le Clerjus
- Location within France Location within Grand Est
- Coordinates: 47°57′37″N 6°19′20″E
- Country: France
- Region: Grand Est
- Department: Vosges
- Arrondissement: Épinal
- Canton: Le Val-d'Ajol
- Intercommunality: CA Épinal

Government
  - Mayor (2020–2026): Philippe Jollet
- Area^{1}: 32.93 km^{2} (12.71 sq mi)
- Elevation: 380 m (1,250 ft)
- Highest elevation: 574 m (1,883 ft)
- Lowest elevation: 307 m (1,007 ft)
- Population (2023): 457
  - Density: 13.9/km^{2} (35.9/sq mi)
- Time zone: UTC+01:00 (CET)
  - Summer (DST): UTC+02:00 (CEST)
- INSEE/Postal code: 88108 /88240
- ^{1} French Land Register data, which excludes lakes, ponds, glaciers > 1 km^{2} (0.386 sq mi or 247 acres) and river estuaries.

Le Clerjus (French pronunciation: [lə klɛʁʒy]) is a commune in the Vosges department in Grand Est in northeastern France.

== See also ==
- Communes of the Vosges department
