= Hautmougey =

- Part of La Vôge-les-Bains
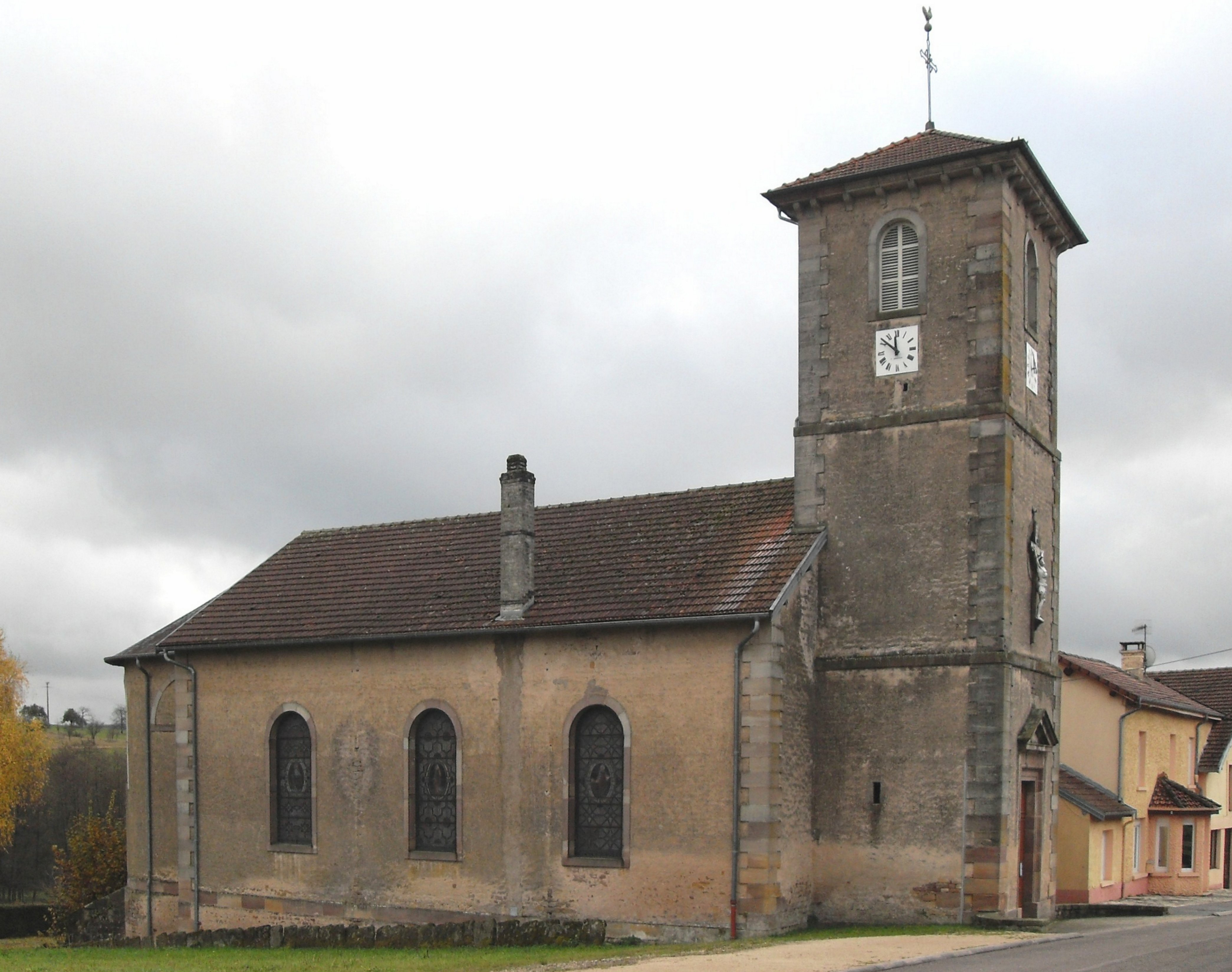
- The church in Hautmougey
- Location of Hautmougey
- Location within France Location within Grand Est
- Coordinates: 48°01′45″N 6°14′00″E
- Country: France
- Region: Grand Est
- Department: Vosges
- Arrondissement: Épinal
- Canton: Le Val-d'Ajol
- Commune: La Vôge-les-Bains
- Area^{1}: 7.87 km^{2} (3.04 sq mi)
- Elevation: 332 m (1,089 ft)
- Highest elevation: 405 m (1,329 ft)
- Lowest elevation: 272 m (892 ft)
- Population (2022): 129
  - Density: 16.4/km^{2} (42.5/sq mi)
- Time zone: UTC+01:00 (CET)
  - Summer (DST): UTC+02:00 (CEST)
- Postal code: 88240
- ^{1} French Land Register data, which excludes lakes, ponds, glaciers > 1 km^{2} (0.386 sq mi or 247 acres) and river estuaries.

Hautmougey (French pronunciation: [omuʒɛ]) is a former commune in the Vosges department in Grand Est in northeastern France. On 1 January 2017, it was merged into the new commune La Vôge-les-Bains.

== Geography ==
The Côney forms the commune's eastern border.

== See also ==
- Communes of the Vosges department
