= Vôge Plateau =

Coordinates: 48°3′N 6°15′E

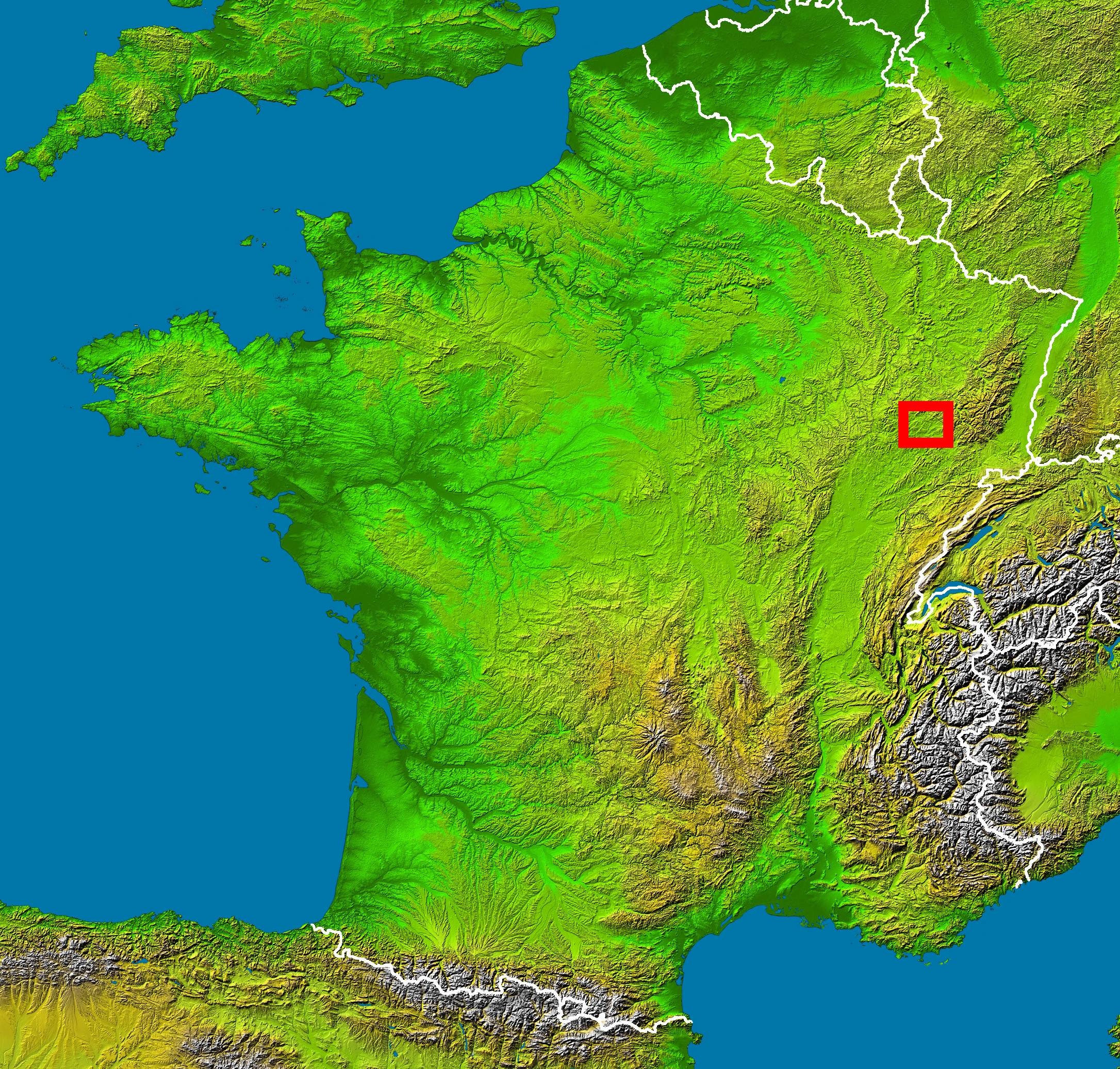
Location of the Voge in France

The Vôge plateau (French pronunciation: [voʒ]) is a sandstone plateau in north east France, straddling the departments of Vosges and Haute-Saône, between Vittel, Saint-Loup-sur-Semouse and Remiremont. It covers approximately 700 km² of Lorraine and Franche-Comté, and includes the towns of Xertigny, Darney, and Bains-les-Bains.

The region is predominantly agricultural, dotted with valleys and mixed forests, such as oak, beech, and pines. The Faucilles mountains represent the dividing line between the drainage basins of the Mediterranean and the North Sea. The area is irrigated by the river Saône and its early tributaries, and there are many lakes in the region.

Vôge is known for its many thermal spas, such as the towns of Bains-les-Bains and Plombières-les-Bains.

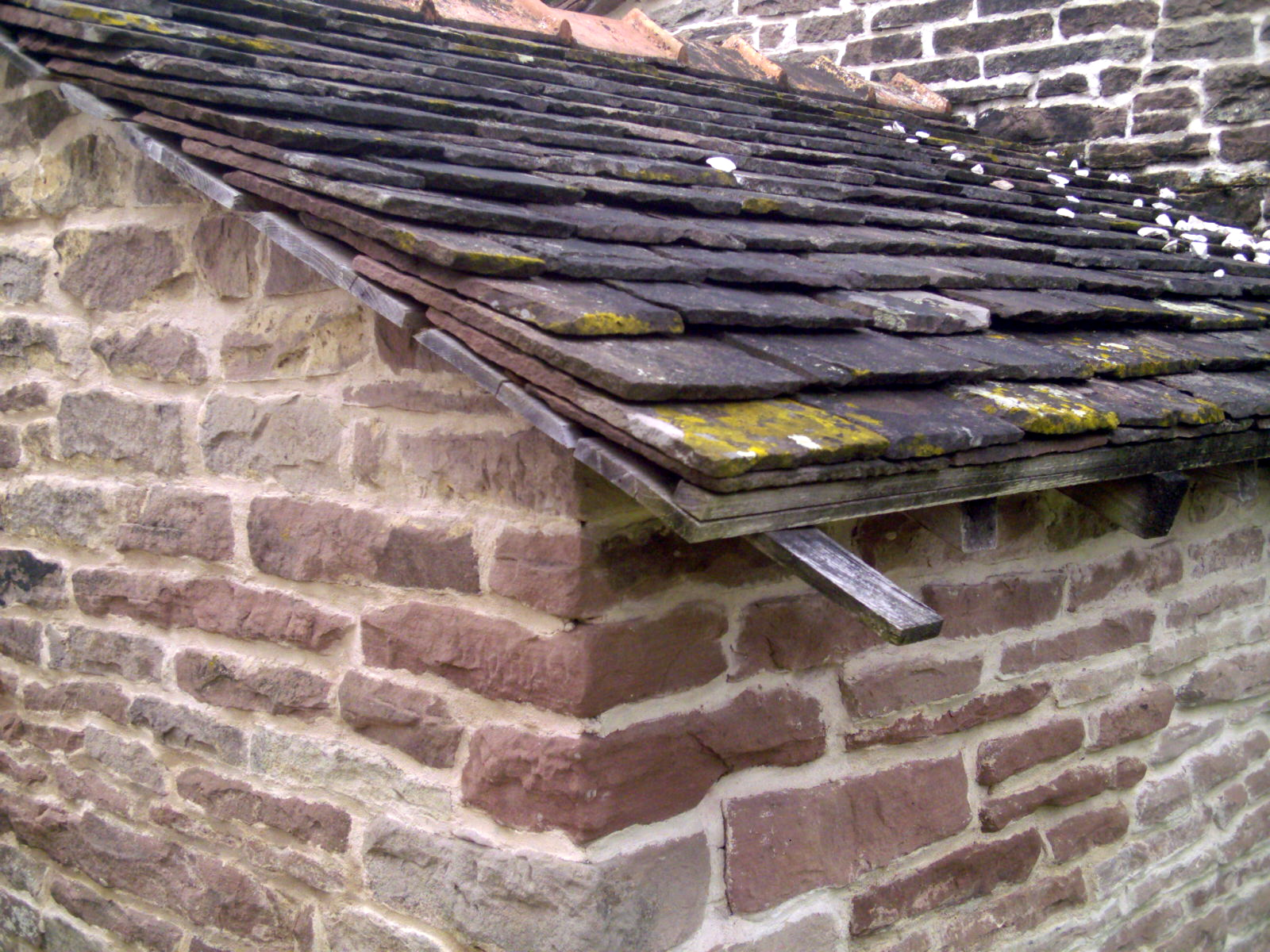
Flagstone roof

The architecture is characterised by the use of sandstone as a construction material, notably for garden walls, and flagstone roofing.
