= La Chapelle-aux-Bois =

- Commune
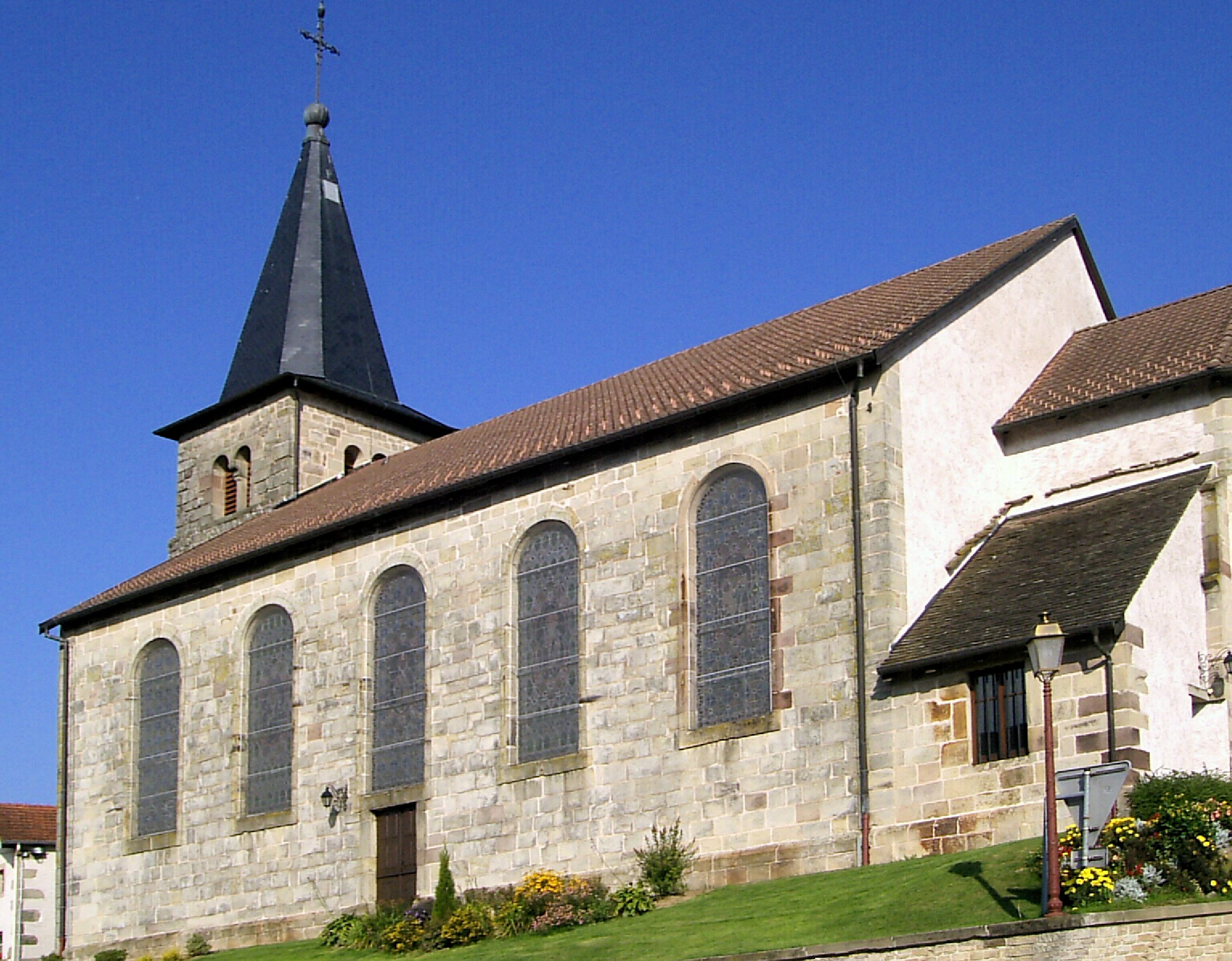
- The church in La Chapelle-aux-Bois

- Coat of arms
- Location of La Chapelle-aux-Bois
- Location within France Location within Grand Est
- Coordinates: 48°02′15″N 6°19′59″E
- Country: France
- Region: Grand Est
- Department: Vosges
- Arrondissement: Épinal
- Canton: Le Val-d'Ajol
- Intercommunality: CA Épinal

Government
  - Mayor (2020–2026): Etienne Blaise
- Area^{1}: 30.65 km^{2} (11.83 sq mi)
- Elevation: 430 m (1,410 ft)
- Highest elevation: 582 m (1,909 ft)
- Lowest elevation: 292 m (958 ft)
- Population (2023): 675
  - Density: 22.0/km^{2} (57.0/sq mi)
- Time zone: UTC+01:00 (CET)
  - Summer (DST): UTC+02:00 (CEST)
- INSEE/Postal code: 88088 /88240
- ^{1} French Land Register data, which excludes lakes, ponds, glaciers > 1 km^{2} (0.386 sq mi or 247 acres) and river estuaries.

La Chapelle-aux-Bois (French pronunciation: [la ʃapɛl o bwa]) is a commune in the Vosges department in Grand Est in northeastern France.

== Geography ==
The Côney forms part of the commune's northwestern border.

== See also ==
- Communes of the Vosges department
