= Grandrupt-de-Bains =

- Commune
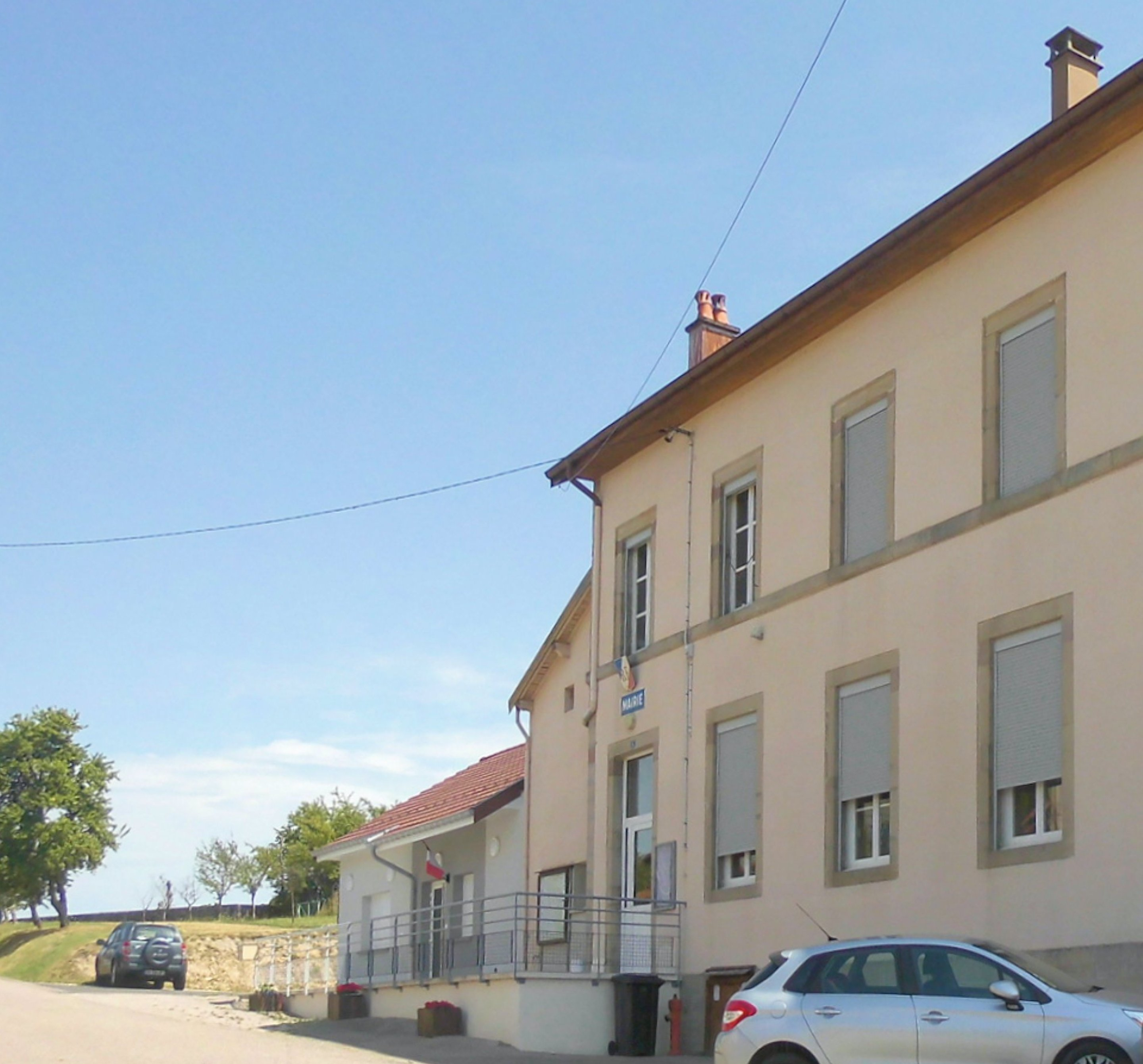
- Grandrupt-de-Bains Town hall
- Location of Grandrupt-de-Bains
- Location within France Location within Grand Est
- Coordinates: 48°03′57″N 6°11′11″E
- Country: France
- Region: Grand Est
- Department: Vosges
- Arrondissement: Neufchâteau
- Canton: Le Val-d'Ajol
- Intercommunality: CC Vosges côté Sud-Ouest

Government
  - Mayor (2020–2026): Francis Didier
- Area^{1}: 3.6 km^{2} (1.4 sq mi)
- Elevation: 442 m (1,450 ft)
- Highest elevation: 467 m (1,532 ft)
- Lowest elevation: 400 m (1,300 ft)
- Population (2023): 72
  - Density: 20/km^{2} (52/sq mi)
- Time zone: UTC+01:00 (CET)
  - Summer (DST): UTC+02:00 (CEST)
- INSEE/Postal code: 88214 /88240
- ^{1} French Land Register data, which excludes lakes, ponds, glaciers > 1 km^{2} (0.386 sq mi or 247 acres) and river estuaries.

Grandrupt-de-Bains (French pronunciation: [ɡʁɑ̃ʁy də bɛ̃]) is a commune in the Vosges department in Grand Est in northeastern France.

== See also ==
- Communes of the Vosges department
