= Trémonzey =

- Commune
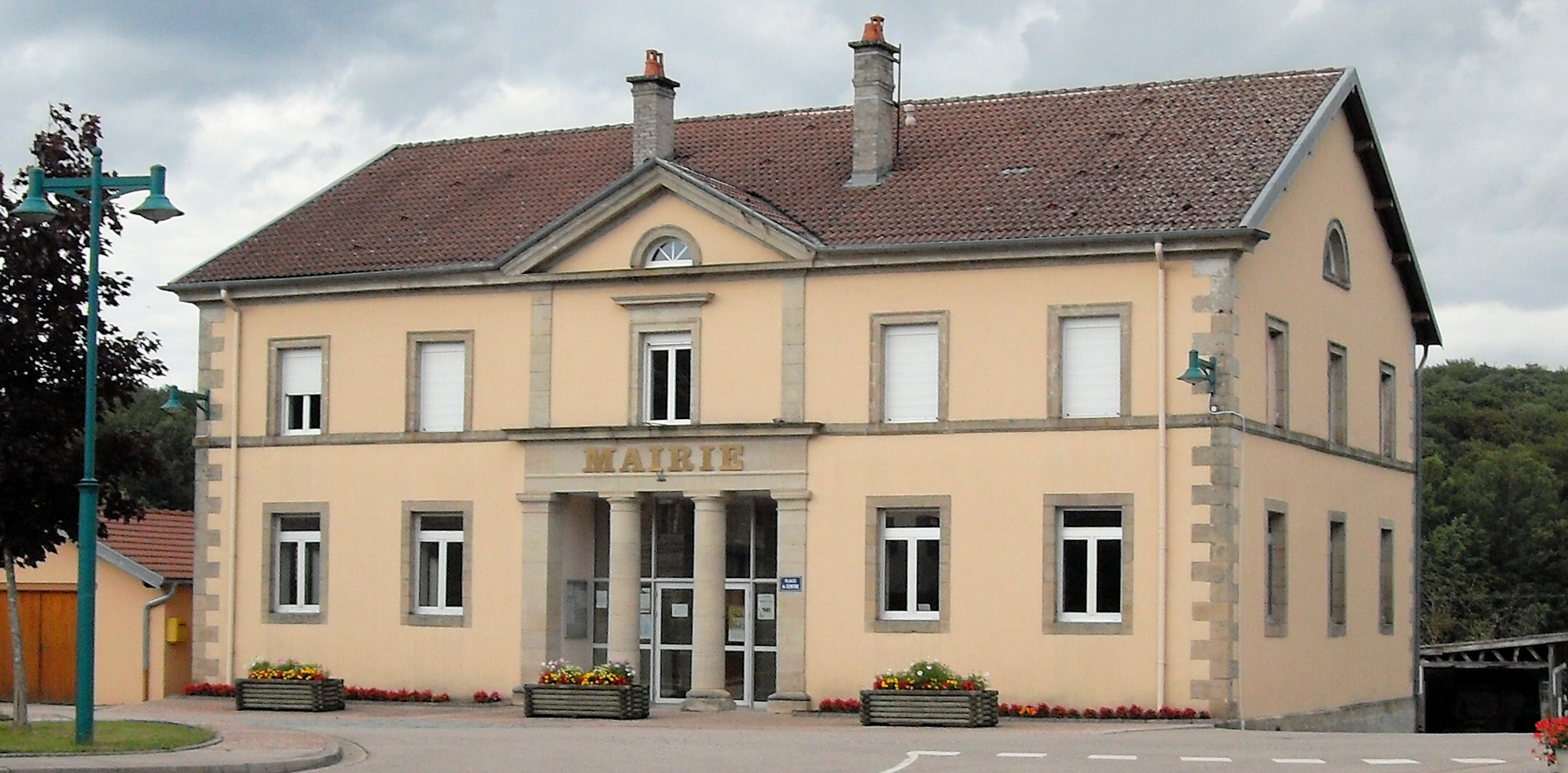
- Town hall
- Location of Trémonzey
- Location within France Location within Grand Est
- Coordinates: 47°58′27″N 6°14′15″E
- Country: France
- Region: Grand Est
- Department: Vosges
- Arrondissement: Épinal
- Canton: Le Val-d'Ajol
- Intercommunality: CA Épinal

Government
  - Mayor (2020–2026): Nadine Robert
- Area^{1}: 9.07 km^{2} (3.50 sq mi)
- Elevation: 372 m (1,220 ft)
- Highest elevation: 403 m (1,322 ft)
- Lowest elevation: 269 m (883 ft)
- Population (2023): 234
  - Density: 25.8/km^{2} (66.8/sq mi)
- Time zone: UTC+01:00 (CET)
  - Summer (DST): UTC+02:00 (CEST)
- INSEE/Postal code: 88479 /88240
- ^{1} French Land Register data, which excludes lakes, ponds, glaciers > 1 km^{2} (0.386 sq mi or 247 acres) and river estuaries.

Trémonzey (French pronunciation: [tʁemɔ̃zɛ]) is a commune in the Vosges department in Grand Est in northeastern France.

== See also ==
- Communes of the Vosges department
