= Les Voivres =

- Commune
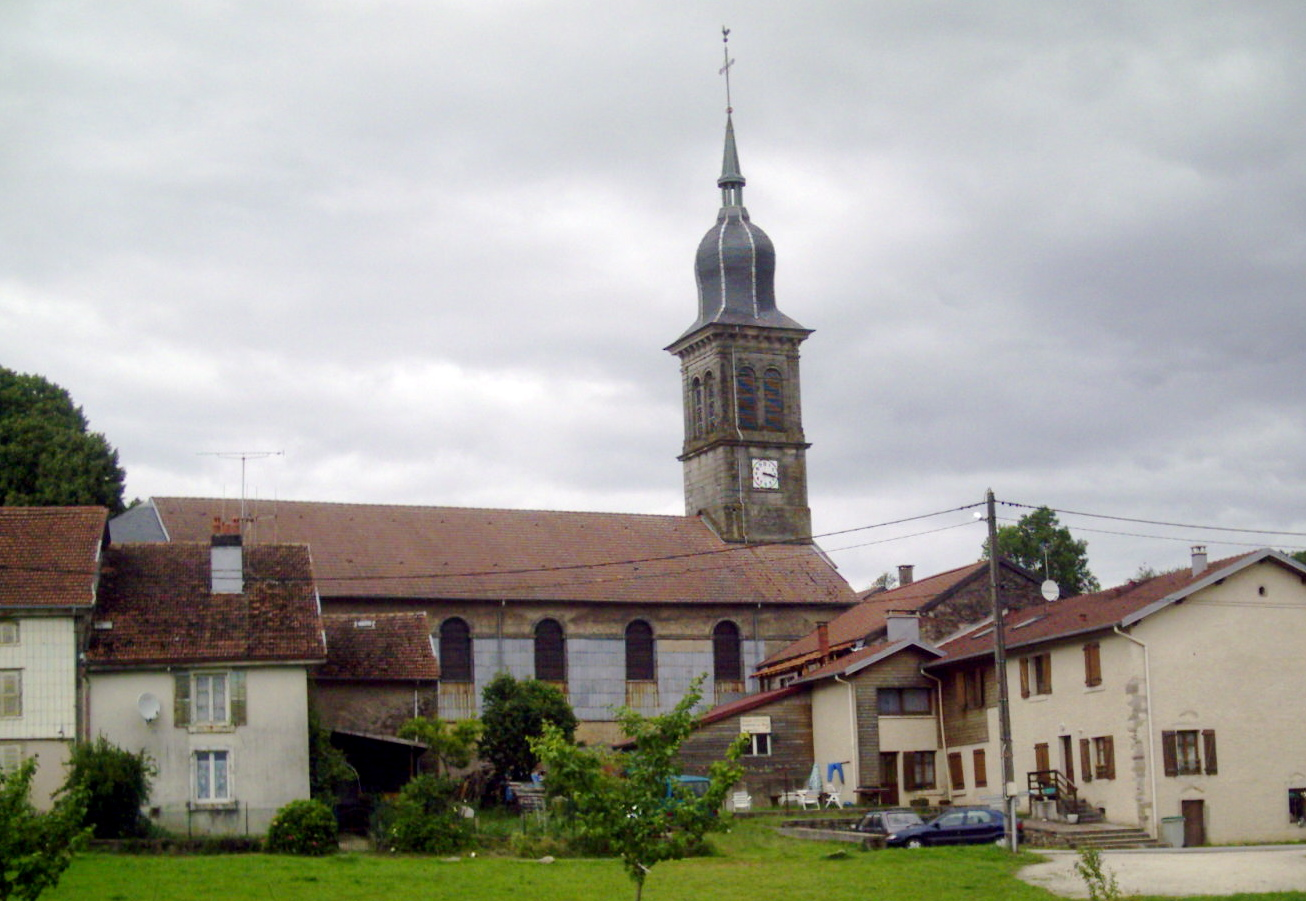
- The church in Les Voivres
- Location of Les Voivres
- Location within France Location within Grand Est
- Coordinates: 48°01′55″N 6°17′43″E
- Country: France
- Region: Grand Est
- Department: Vosges
- Arrondissement: Épinal
- Canton: Le Val-d'Ajol
- Intercommunality: CA Épinal

Government
  - Mayor (2020–2026): Michel Fournier
- Area^{1}: 12.81 km^{2} (4.95 sq mi)
- Highest elevation: 422 m (1,385 ft)
- Lowest elevation: 280 m (920 ft)
- Population (2023): 283
  - Density: 22.1/km^{2} (57.2/sq mi)
- Time zone: UTC+01:00 (CET)
  - Summer (DST): UTC+02:00 (CEST)
- INSEE/Postal code: 88520 /88240
- ^{1} French Land Register data, which excludes lakes, ponds, glaciers > 1 km^{2} (0.386 sq mi or 247 acres) and river estuaries.

Les Voivres (French pronunciation: [le vwavʁ]) is a commune in the Vosges department in Grand Est in northeastern France.

== Geography ==
The Côney forms most of the commune's northwestern border; a stream called le Jeandin, tributary of the Côney, forms the commune's northern border.

== See also ==
- Communes of the Vosges department
