= Montmotier =

- Commune
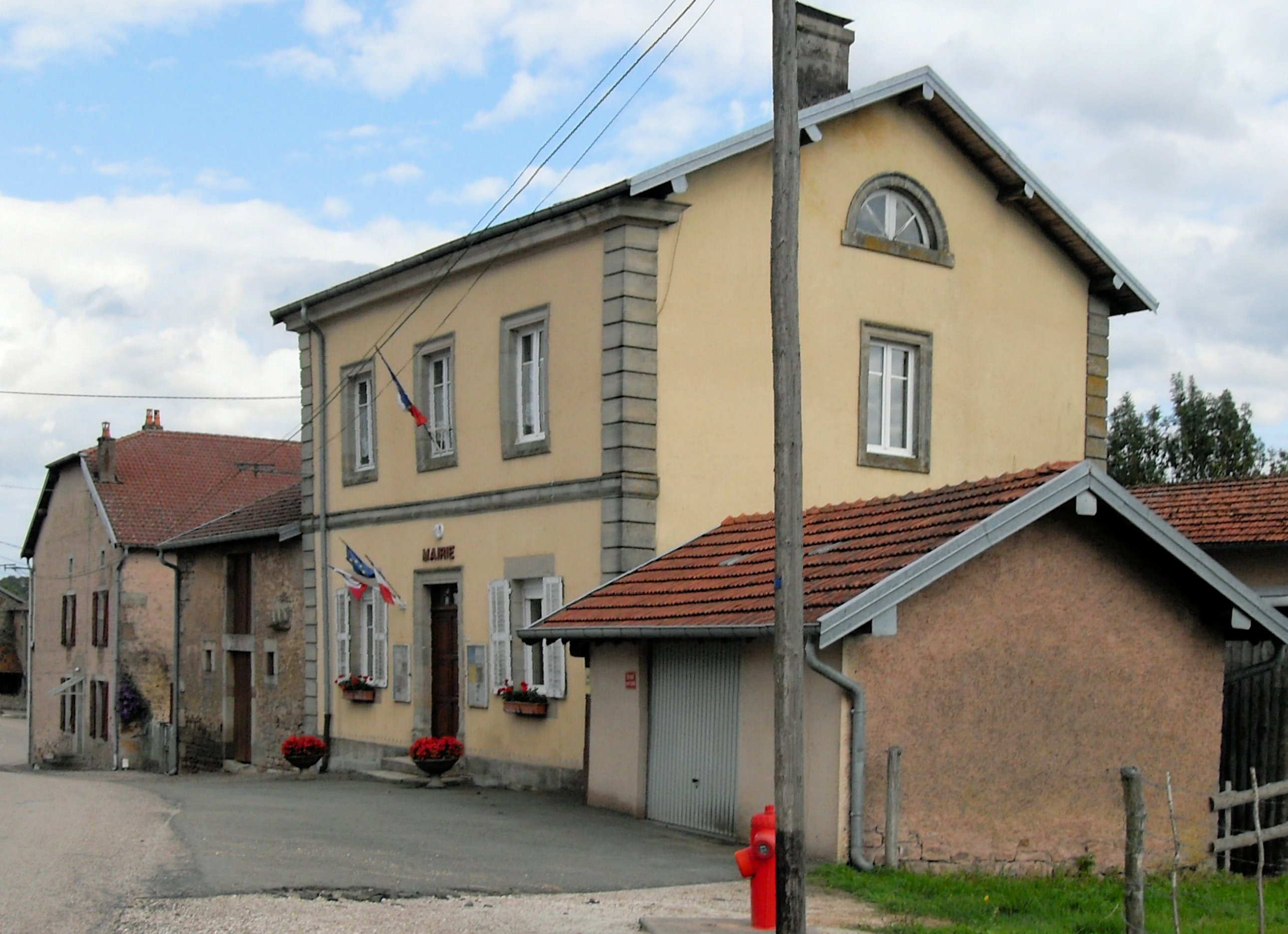
- The town hall in Montmotier
- Location of Montmotier
- Location within France Location within Grand Est
- Coordinates: 47°58′27″N 6°10′37″E
- Country: France
- Region: Grand Est
- Department: Vosges
- Arrondissement: Épinal
- Canton: Le Val-d'Ajol
- Intercommunality: CA Épinal

Government
  - Mayor (2020–2026): Jean-Pierre Poirot
- Area^{1}: 4.24 km^{2} (1.64 sq mi)
- Highest elevation: 309 m (1,014 ft)
- Lowest elevation: 247 m (810 ft)
- Population (2023): 35
  - Density: 8.3/km^{2} (21/sq mi)
- Time zone: UTC+01:00 (CET)
  - Summer (DST): UTC+02:00 (CEST)
- INSEE/Postal code: 88311 /88240
- ^{1} French Land Register data, which excludes lakes, ponds, glaciers > 1 km^{2} (0.386 sq mi or 247 acres) and river estuaries.

Montmotier (French pronunciation: [mɔ̃mɔtje]) is a commune in the Vosges department in Grand Est in northeastern France.

== Geography ==
The Côney forms the commune's southern border.

== See also ==
- Communes of the Vosges department
