= Plombières-les-Bains =

- Commune
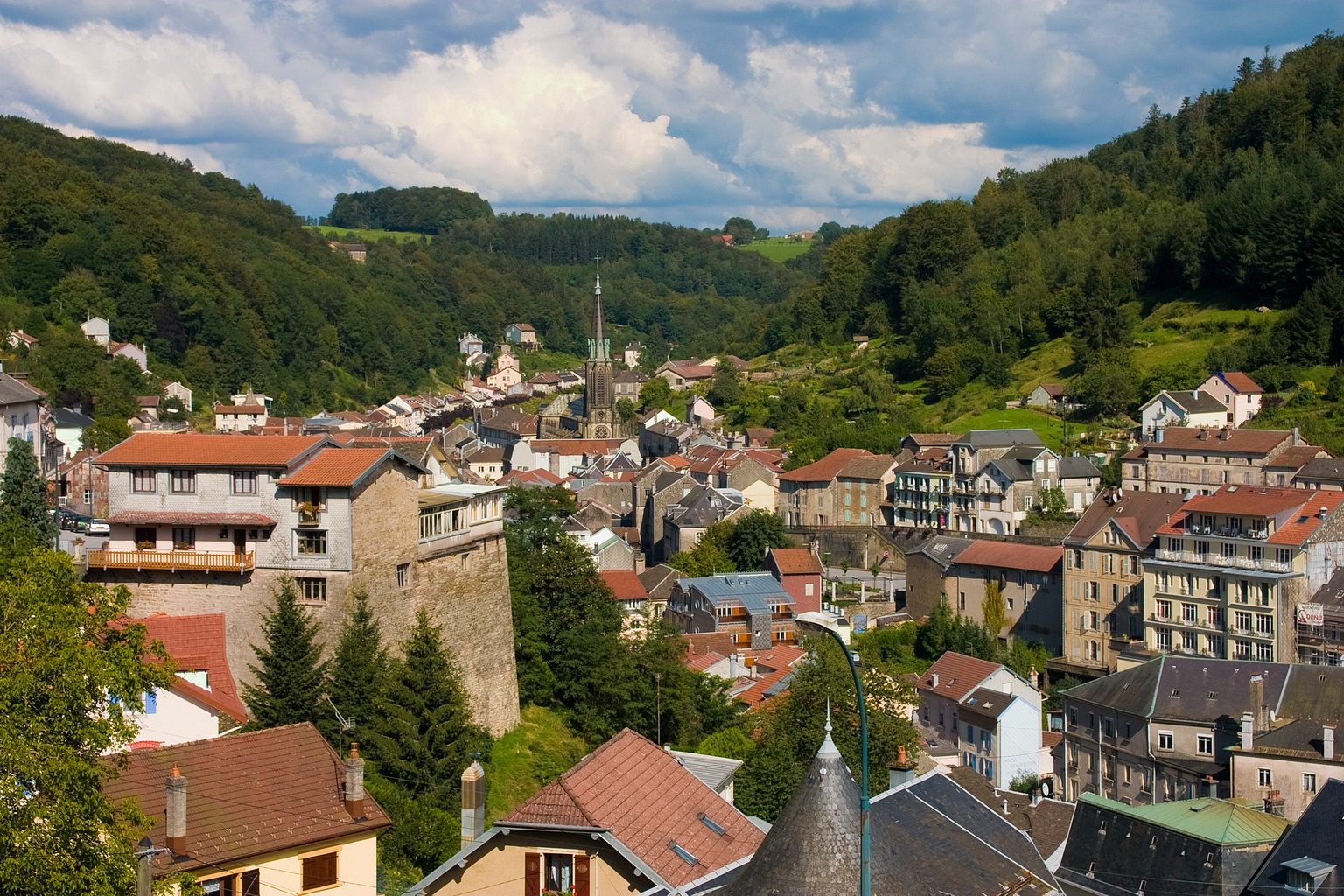
- A general view of Plombières-les-Bains

- Flag Coat of arms
- Location of Plombières-les-Bains
- Location within France Location within Grand Est
- Coordinates: 47°58′02″N 6°27′50″E
- Country: France
- Region: Grand Est
- Department: Vosges
- Arrondissement: Épinal
- Canton: Le Val-d'Ajol
- Intercommunality: CC Porte des Vosges Méridionales

Government
  - Mayor (2020–2026): Lydie Barbaux
- Area^{1}: 27.2 km^{2} (10.5 sq mi)
- Highest elevation: 576 m (1,890 ft)
- Lowest elevation: 335 m (1,099 ft)
- Population (2023): 1,573
  - Density: 57.8/km^{2} (150/sq mi)
- Time zone: UTC+01:00 (CET)
  - Summer (DST): UTC+02:00 (CEST)
- INSEE/Postal code: 88351 /88370
- ^{1} French Land Register data, which excludes lakes, ponds, glaciers > 1 km^{2} (0.386 sq mi or 247 acres) and river estuaries.

Plombières-les-Bains (French pronunciation: [plɔ̃bjɛʁ le bɛ̃]) is a commune in the Vosges department in Grand Est in eastern France. It was the seat of the former canton of Plombières-les-Bains.

Les bains refers to the hot springs in the area, whose properties were first discovered by the Romans. In succeeding centuries, its baths were visited by Montaigne, Voltaire, the Dukes of Guise, the Dukes of Lorraine, Beaumarchais, Napoleon Bonaparte, Joséphine de Beauharnais, Charles XIV John, Napoléon III, Berlioz, Lamartine and Alfred de Musset. It is still a spa town with many buildings from the Second French Empire including the Church Saint Amé built with the financial support of Napoléon III.

The commune is listed as a Village étape.

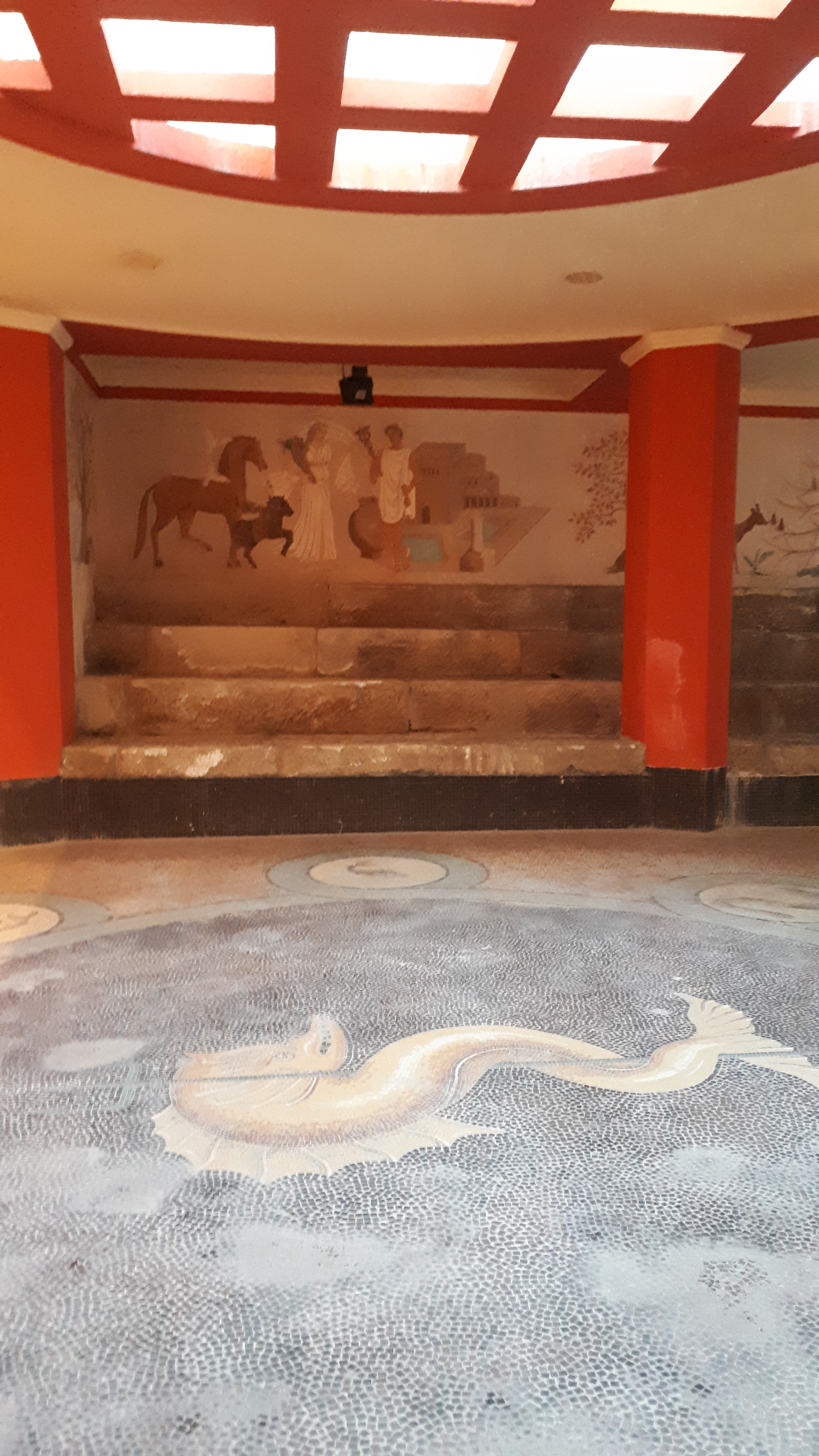
The ancient steps, interior decorations and the mosaic of the Roman bath in Plombières-les-Bains

== Plombières Agreement ==
The "Pavilion of the Princes" at Plombières, was renamed following the meeting on 21 July 1858 between Napoleon III and Camillo Benso, Count of Cavour, who secretly negotiated the “Plombières Agreement” as they sat alone together in a small horse-drawn carriage slowly progressing round and round the town. This accord granted French aid to the cause of Piedmont-Sardinia against the Austrian Empire in return for the territories of Savoy and Nice, which thereafter became French.

== Plombieres ice cream ==
In Russia, the highest of the state standard quality categories of ice cream, containing at least 12% butterfat, is known as "plombir" (пломбир), a slight distortion of the pronunciation of "Plombières" in Russian. According to Dmitry Ushakov's Explanatory Dictionary of the Russian Language and Max Vasmer's authoritative "Etymological dictionary of the Russian language", the French dessert plombieres is named after Plombières, whose name has been associated with extravagant frozen desserts since the late 19th century. But the name of the molded French sweet is probably taken from the mold.

== See also ==
- Communes of the Vosges department
