= La Haye, Vosges =

La Haye
- Commune
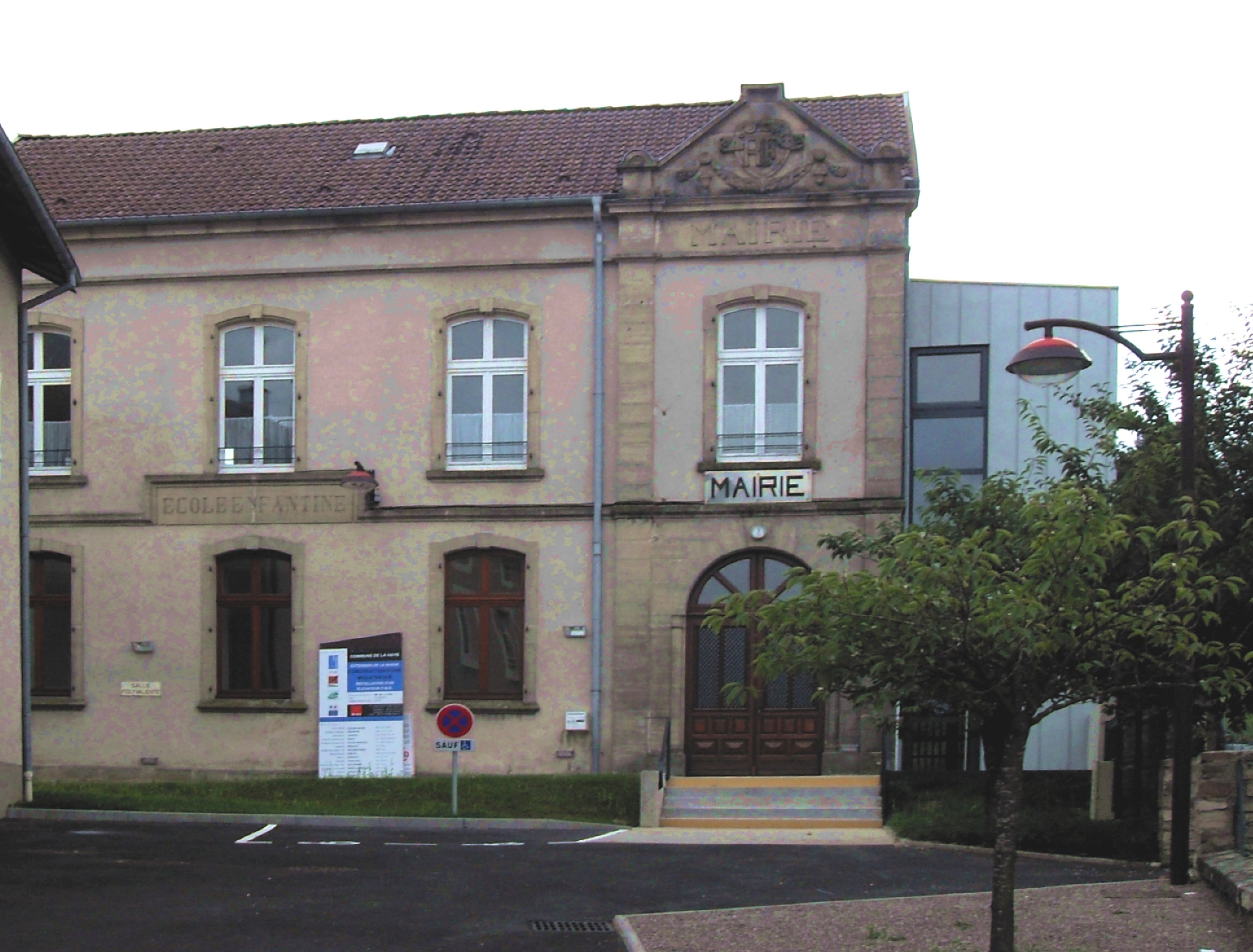
- The town hall in La Haye
- Location of La Haye
- Location within France Location within Grand Est
- Coordinates: 48°03′55″N 6°13′29″E
- Country: France
- Region: Grand Est
- Department: Vosges
- Arrondissement: Épinal
- Canton: Le Val-d'Ajol
- Intercommunality: CA Épinal

Government
  - Mayor (2020–2026): Patrick Casadevall
- Area^{1}: 7.34 km^{2} (2.83 sq mi)
- Elevation: 350 m (1,150 ft)
- Highest elevation: 461 m (1,512 ft)
- Lowest elevation: 349 m (1,145 ft)
- Population (2023): 125
  - Density: 17.0/km^{2} (44.1/sq mi)
- Time zone: UTC+01:00 (CET)
  - Summer (DST): UTC+02:00 (CEST)
- INSEE/Postal code: 88236 /88240
- ^{1} French Land Register data, which excludes lakes, ponds, glaciers > 1 km^{2} (0.386 sq mi or 247 acres) and river estuaries.

La Haye (French pronunciation: [la ɛ]) is a commune in the Vosges department in Grand Est in northeastern France.

== See also ==
- Communes of the Vosges department
