= Gruey-lès-Surance =

- Commune
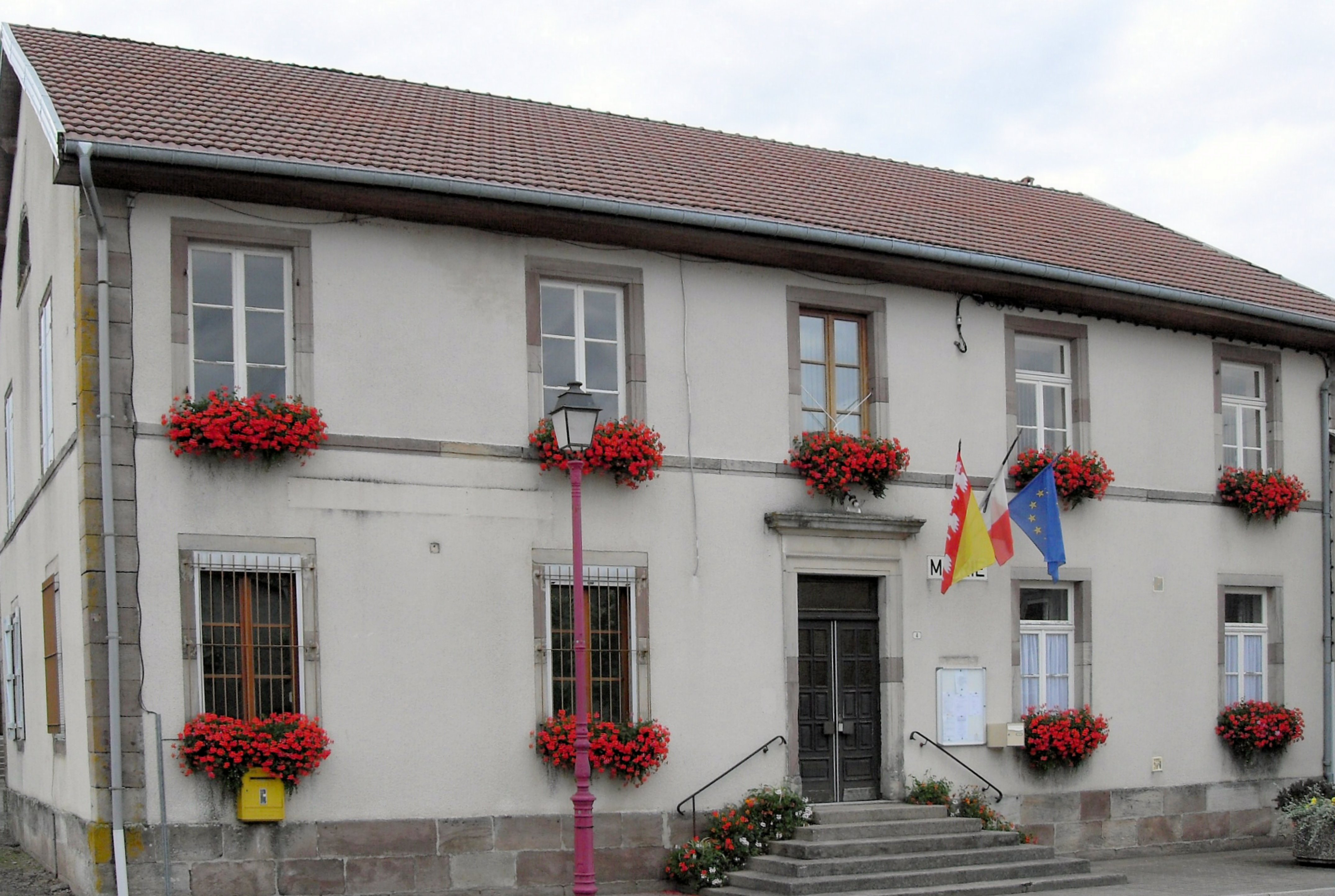
- Town hall
- Location of Gruey-lès-Surance
- Location within France Location within Grand Est
- Coordinates: 48°02′19″N 6°11′06″E
- Country: France
- Region: Grand Est
- Department: Vosges
- Arrondissement: Épinal
- Canton: Le Val-d'Ajol
- Intercommunality: CA Épinal

Government
  - Mayor (2020–2026): Marie-Odile Beurné
- Area^{1}: 27.1 km^{2} (10.5 sq mi)
- Elevation: 422 m (1,385 ft)
- Highest elevation: 488 m (1,601 ft)
- Lowest elevation: 323 m (1,060 ft)
- Population (2023): 204
  - Density: 7.53/km^{2} (19.5/sq mi)
- Time zone: UTC+01:00 (CET)
  - Summer (DST): UTC+02:00 (CEST)
- INSEE/Postal code: 88221 /88240
- ^{1} French Land Register data, which excludes lakes, ponds, glaciers > 1 km^{2} (0.386 sq mi or 247 acres) and river estuaries.

Gruey-lès-Surance (French pronunciation: [ɡʁyɛ lɛ syʁɑ̃s]) is a commune in the Vosges department in Grand Est in northeastern France.

== See also ==
- Communes of the Vosges department
