= Bellefontaine, Vosges =

Bellefontaine
- Commune
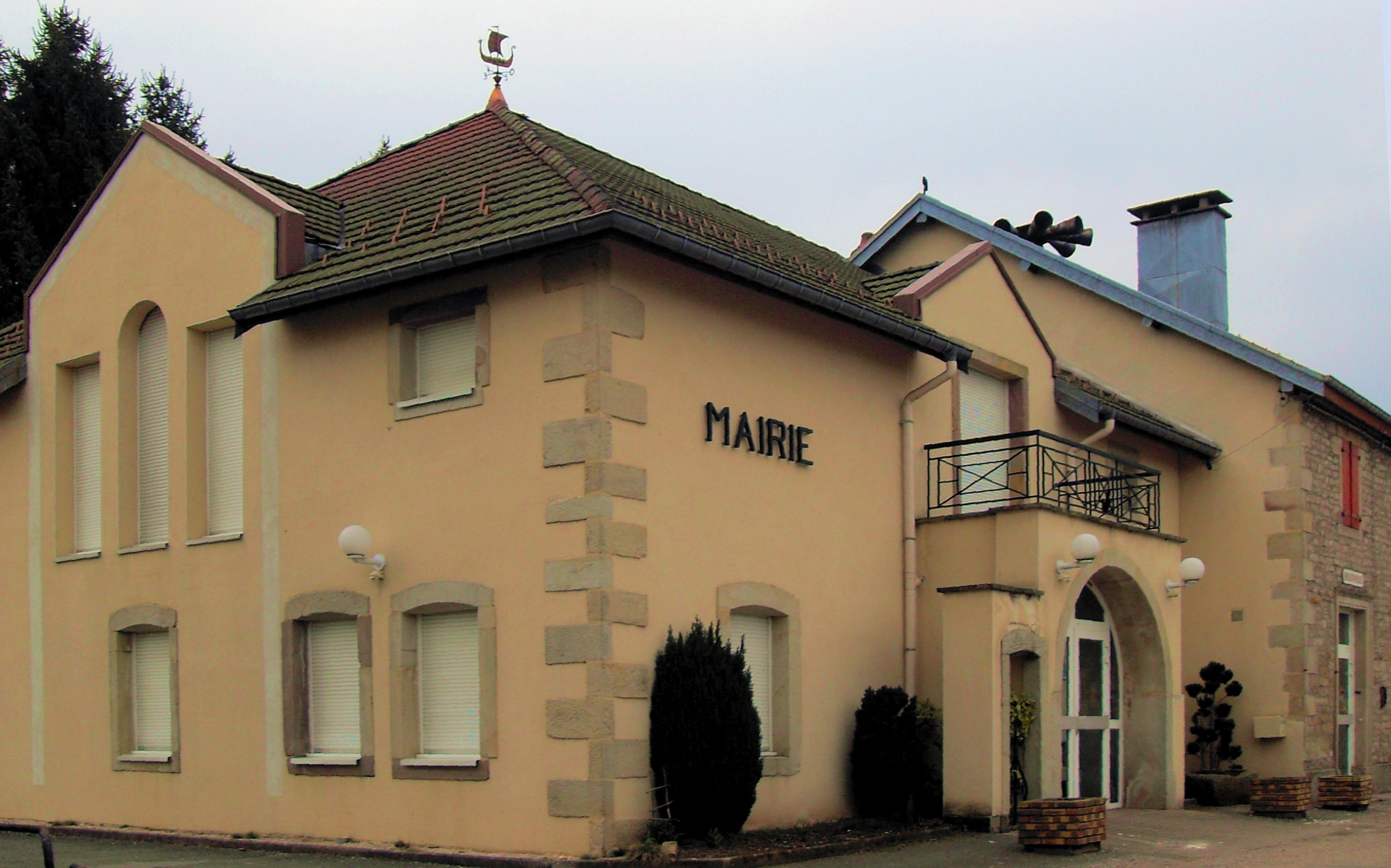
- The town hall in Bellefontaine

- Coat of arms
- Location of Bellefontaine
- Location within France Location within Grand Est
- Coordinates: 48°00′50″N 6°26′37″E
- Country: France
- Region: Grand Est
- Department: Vosges
- Arrondissement: Épinal
- Canton: Le Val-d'Ajol
- Intercommunality: CA Épinal

Government
  - Mayor (2020–2026): Philippe Claudon
- Area^{1}: 39.11 km^{2} (15.10 sq mi)
- Elevation: 550 m (1,800 ft)
- Highest elevation: 614 m (2,014 ft)
- Lowest elevation: 440 m (1,440 ft)
- Population (2023): 952
  - Density: 24.3/km^{2} (63.0/sq mi)
- Time zone: UTC+01:00 (CET)
  - Summer (DST): UTC+02:00 (CEST)
- INSEE/Postal code: 88048 /88370
- ^{1} French Land Register data, which excludes lakes, ponds, glaciers > 1 km^{2} (0.386 sq mi or 247 acres) and river estuaries.

Bellefontaine (French pronunciation: [bɛlfɔ̃tɛn]) is a commune in the Vosges department in Grand Est in northeastern France.

== See also ==
- Communes of the Vosges department
