= Canton of Le Val-d'Ajol =

Coordinates: 47.93°N 6.48°E

The canton of Le Val-d'Ajol is an administrative division of the Vosges department, in northeastern France. It was created at the French canton reorganisation which came into effect in March 2015. Its seat is in Le Val-d'Ajol.

It consists of the following communes:

1. Bellefontaine
2. La Chapelle-aux-Bois
3. Charmois-l'Orgueilleux
4. Le Clerjus
5. Dounoux
6. Fontenoy-le-Château
7. Girmont-Val-d'Ajol
8. Grandrupt-de-Bains
9. Gruey-lès-Surance
10. Hadol
11. La Haye
12. Montmotier
13. Plombières-les-Bains
14. Trémonzey
15. Uriménil
16. Uzemain
17. Le Val-d'Ajol
18. Vioménil
19. La Vôge-les-Bains
20. Les Voivres
21. Xertigny
