= Winden–Karlsruhe railway =

Railway line in Germany

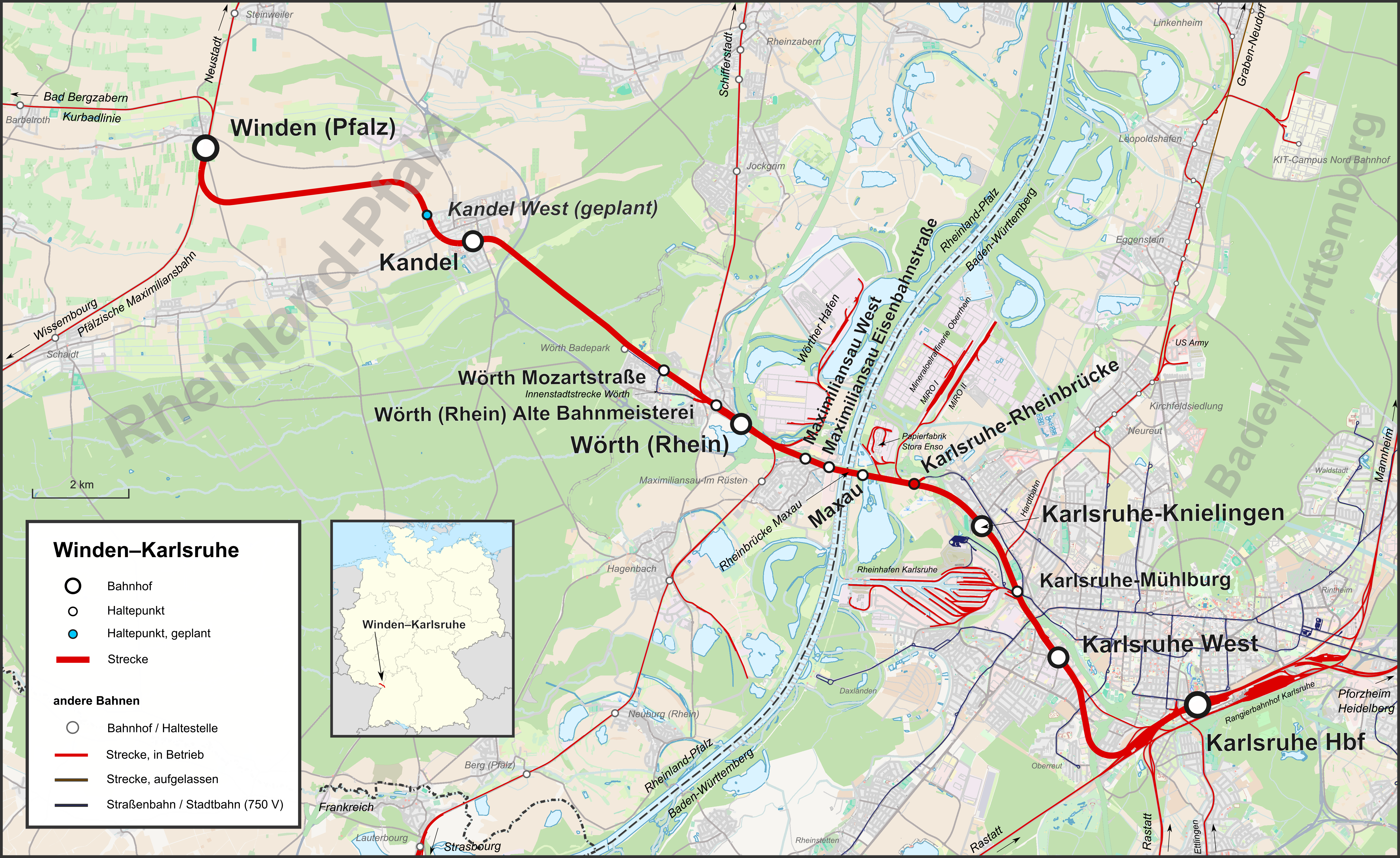

Overview
- Line number: 676
- Locale: Rhineland-Palatinate, Baden-Württemberg, Germany

Service
- Route number: 3443

Technical
- Line length: 26.5 km (16.5 mi)
- Number of tracks: Wörth (Rhein)–Karlsruhe Hbf Südeinf
- Track gauge: 1,435 mm (4 ft 8 1/2 in) standard gauge
- Minimum radius: Wörth–Karlsruhe:488 m (1,601 ft)
- Electrification: Wörth (Rhein)–Karlsruhe: 15 kV/16.7 Hz AC overhead
- Operating speed: 140 km/h (87 mph) (maximum)
- Maximum incline: < 1.0%

The Winden–Karlsruhe railway is a mainline railway in the German states of Baden-Württemberg and Rhineland-Palatinate, which in its present form has existed since 1938 and is electrified between Wörth and Karlsruhe. The current Winden–Wörth section was opened in 1864. A year later, the gap between the Rhine and the Maxau Railway (Maxaubahn), which had been opened in 1862, was closed. The route of the latter was changed during the relocation of the Karlsruhe Hauptbahnhof. New sections of the line were also built between Wörth and Mühlburg mainly in connection with the commissioning of a fixed bridge over the Rhine.

The latter work significantly increased its importance. Today the route is operated together with the Neustadt–Winden section of the Neustadt–Wissembourg railway as timetable route 676. Several lines of the Karlsruhe Stadtbahn also run between Wörth and Karlsruhe.

== History ==
The first attempts to build a railway in the area of today's route stem from 1838, soon after the floating of the Palatine Ludwig Railway Company (Pfälzische Ludwigsbahn-Gesellschaft). In this context, a proposal was made for a route from Zweibrücken along the Schwarzbach and via Rodalben, Annweiler and Langenkandel (later: Kandel) on the Rhine, which was not accepted. In the period from 1847 to 1849, the east–west aligned Palatine Ludwig Railway (Pfälzische Ludwigsbahn) was built from Ludwigshafen to Bexbach. This line was mainly used for the transport of coal. In 1855, the Palatine Maximilian Railway (Pfälzische Maximiliansbahn) was opened between Neustadt and Wissembourg to carry coal from Saargegend and Palatine agricultural produce to France.

However, the Palatine Maximilian Railway did not meet expectations in the first few years of its existence. In particular, the French railway company Chemins de fer de l'Est succeeded in blocking the competitiveness of all links to areas of France near the Rhine from outside of France through various measures such as the manipulation of tariffs. In addition, it supplied a large part of the demand for coal within the department of Haut-Rhin via the Rémilly–Saarbrücken railway to Frouard. This traffic continued over the railway to Strasbourg or along rivers to Mulhouse. Against this background, the Palatinate was forced to look for other markets, preferably on the other side of the Rhine.

As a result, the Palatine Maximilian Railway Company (Pfälzische Maximiliansbahn-Gesellschaft), which had built the line from Neustadt to Wissembourg, planned to build a railway branching off in Winden to Karlsruhe, especially as it had to increase its financial returns. It was hoped that the planned route would transport coal to better markets in the southern German countries of Baden, Württemberg and the main part of Bavaria, which was geographically separated from the Circle of the Rhine (Rheinpfalz). Initially, the planners considered a route possibly branching off in Rohrbach. However, taking note of the interests of Bergzabern, which also required a connection to the rail network, the company refrained from it.

=== Planning ===
The municipality of Kandel, in particular, fought strongly for such a line, referring in this context to the large number of inhabitants in its area and the creation of jobs in the construction of the railway. The Bavarian Karl Krazeisen, who was at that time a troop commander in the Palatinate, emphasised that such a route was necessary for strategic reasons.

In 1859, the Palatine Maximilian Railway Company received a concession for the line from the Ministry of Trade and Public Works. In the summer of the following year, the route and the design of the project were determined accordingly. However, there was resistance from the town of Germersheim, which instead supported the construction of a railway line through its territory and from there to Bruchsal. In a memorandum, the town of Germersheim and the commander of the Germersheim fortress also argued that a line from Winden to Karlsruhe, as opposed to a line though the territory of the fortress would not be military secure and that it was strategically important to establish a connection with the other fortresses like Koblenz, Landau, Mainz and Rastatt. The Palatinate government however rejected the Germersheim proposal.

In addition, several representatives of South Palatine municipalities came together in Rülzheim in 1860, which instead petitioned against a route via Winden and Kandel instead argued for a line from Landau via Offenbach, Herxheim, Leimersheim and Leopoldshafen to Karlsruhe. They argued that a route via Winden and Kandel was contrary to the public interest and would be exclusively a "coal railway", which primarily served its shareholders. Furthermore, they argued that their proposed route affected a greater number of places and people than the planned route through Kandel. In this context, they referred to the foodstuffs produced in Rülzheim, the weavers resident in Herxheim, and the trade in hemp and flax fibre and the handling of goods in the port of Leimersheim. In addition, the cultivation of tobacco and trading of cattle played an important role in the region. A connection to Speyer could be built at a later date from Rülzheim via Germersheim. The proposed route via Kandel would also be unsafe in a possible war because of its proximity to the French border. The government in Bavaria was of the same opinion. Nevertheless, the Rülzheim petition was unsuccessful.

=== Construction, opening and first years ===
Bavaria passed a law on 10 November 1861 that guaranteed the company a grant of interest for a total investment of one and a half million gulden. The concession followed on 28 June of the following year. Already the Maxau Railway had been opened on the Baden side from Karlsruhe to the right (eastern) bank of the Rhine near the hamlet of Maxau on 5 August 1862. The Winden–Maximiliansau section was approved on 14 March 1864. Although it ran through Minfeld, a district to the south-east of Winden, it did not have a station, because a cattle trough had had to be relocated for the track construction and this had led to conflicts.

One year later, on 8 May 1865, the gap between Maximiliansau and the Maxau Railway was closed in the form of a bridge over the Rhine. This was built for road traffic in 1840 and had been modified to allow rail operations as well. It was the first pontoon bridge to be used on a railway in Europe and was therefore considered a technical innovation.

=== Further development ===
Although the line was used to carry passengers, the change of locomotive required to cross the Rhine prevented significant through traffic. Subsequently, a second track was installed between Winden and Wörth. From 1 January 1870, the management of the section of the line to the west of the Rhine was taken over by the newly founded Palatinate Railway (Pfälzische Eisenbahnen), which had been created by the merger of the Palatine railway companies, although the Maximilian Railway was still formally the owner and possessed the concession for its construction and operation. The Maximilian Railway was always responsible for the transfer of trains across the Rhine. The operator of the east-bank section was the Grand Duchy of Baden State Railway (Großherzoglich Badische Staatseisenbahnen). From 1895 onwards the freight bypass railway branched off between the stations of Mühlburg and Knielingen; this carried a large part of the freight traffic. Telephone wires were installed along the Winden–Wörth section in 1907. Ticket barriers were installed at stations along the line from Winden to Maxau. On 1 January 1909, the Winden–Rheinbrücke section of the line together with the other lines in the Palatinate were taken over by the Royal Bavarian State Railways (Königlich Bayerische Staatseisenbahnen).

As early as 1900, the Baden Ministry of the Interior had approved the relocation of the Karlsruhe Hauptbahnhof, since on the one hand it had reached the limits of its capacity and, on the other hand, the many level crossings in the urban area were increasingly an obstacle for pedestrians and trams. The new location was on the southern outskirts. As a result, the section of railway to the east of Knielingen had to be relocated. This would circumnavigate the city in a large semicircular arc. It was conceived as running from the western part of the freight bypass railway built in 1895 to just before the West station (Westbahnhof), which was also built in 1895 at the same time as the marshalling yard. On 23 October 1913, the new Hauptbahnhof and the relocated Maxau Railway were opened. At the same time, Mühlburg received a new station, which also serves as a junction station for the line that passed through Eggenstein and Linkenheim to Graben-Neudorf. The southern part of Eggenstein also had to be rebuilt. Until then, Mühlburger Tor station, which has since been abandoned, occupied this function. A few years later, Karlsruhe Zeppelinstraße (later called Karlsruhe West) station was added in the vicinity of the West station between Mühlburg and Karlsruhe Hauptbahnhof.

=== Weimar Republic and the Third Reich (1920–1945) ===
In 1920, the line became part of the newly founded Deutsche Reichsbahn. In 1922, the Palatinate section was integrated into the newly founded Reichsbahndirektion Ludwigshafen (railway division of Ludwigshafen) and the Baden section became part of the Reichsbahndirektion Karlsruhe. After the First World War, France occupied the Palatinate and the railways in the Palatinate were operated by the French military from 1923 to 1924. Over the decades, traffic had been steadily increasing. Since the railways had to comply with a timetable, these services had priority over the barge traffic. This caused congestion of the traffic on the Rhine. This situation was even worse for road traffic, which was only allowed to cross the bridge once the shipping traffic had cleared. The political and economic situation of the 1920s frustrated the plans for a permanent Rhine bridge. Baden and Bavaria provided money for the construction of such a bridge from 1934, after which work began. With the dissolution of the Ludwigshafen railway division in 1937 all of the line came within the jurisdiction of Karlsruhe from 1 February 1937. The local Reichsbahn-Betriebsamt (Deutsche Reichsbahn operations office, RBA) was also based in Karlsruhe.

On 4 April of the following year, a fixed Rhine bridge was opened near Maxau and the dismantling of the pontoon bridge followed. The former Maximiliansau station lost its function as a result. Instead, the locality was given a new station immediately to the west of the new bridge. At the same time, a new Mühlburg–Maxau section of the line was built. The route, which had previously passed through Knielingen, now ran along the south-western edge of the village, so Knielingen also received a new station. In addition, the Wörth–Karlsruhe section was subsequently rebuilt with two tracks.

Due to the new Rhine bridge, the main traffic flows, which had previously been on the Landau–Bruchsal and the Neustadt–Wissembourg axes, were now aligned towards Karlsruhe. Similarly, express trains on the Saarbrücken–Munich route from then on ran via Winden and Karlsruhe. In 1944, a connection was established from Karlsruhe West station to the Rhine Railway towards Rastatt for strategic reasons. At the beginning of 1945, rail traffic on the line came to a standstill as a result of the Second World War. In the same year, the bridge across the Rhine was destroyed in air raids.

=== Postwar and Deutsche Bundesbahn (1945–1993) ===
As a result of the division of Germany into occupation zones, the section on the line to the west of the Rhine became responsible on 31 August 1945 to the Eisenbahndirektion Mainz (railway division of Mainz), the legal successor of the Reichsbahn railway division of the same name. The railway division of Mainz became responsible for all railway lines that became part of the state of Rhineland-Palatinate, which was founded one year later. The railway division of Karlsruhe continued to be responsible for the Baden section of the line.

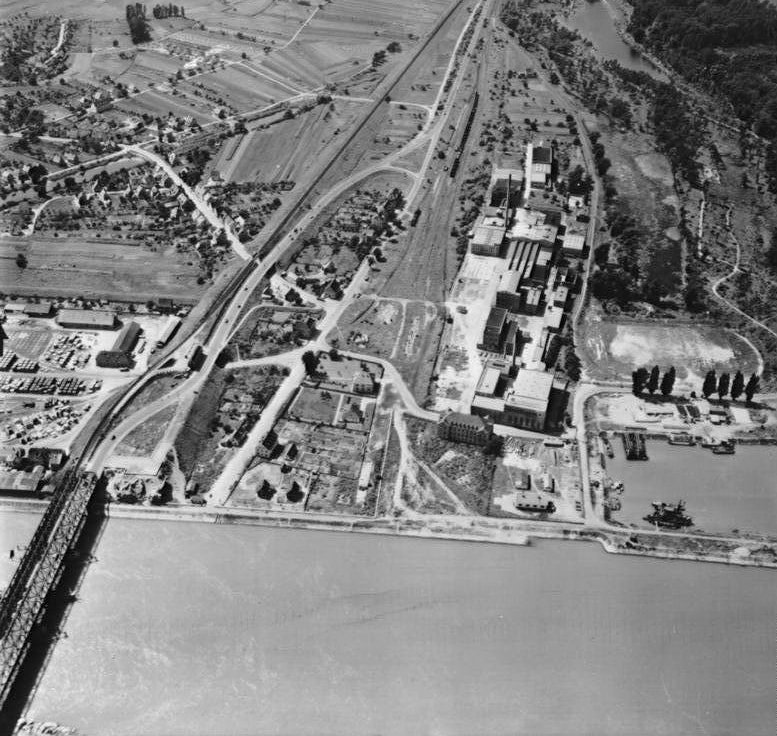
The section of the track within Maximiliansau (left in the picture), the tracks of the former Maximiliansau station are in the upper right

As a result of the disruption of the Rhine crossing, the trains on the western section of the line were only operated as far as Wörth. As a substitute for the damaged Rhine bridge, a new prefabricated military-style bridge was commissioned in 1947; this was originally intended as be temporary, but it became permanent. In the same year, the Betriebsvereinigung der Südwestdeutsche Eisenbahnen (Operations union of South West German railways, SWDE) took over operations. These were gradually integrated with Deutsche Bundesbahn, which was founded in 1949. The connection curve built during the Second World War was subsequently dismantled. In the course of the gradual dissolution of the railway division of Mainz, the railway division of Karlsruhe took responsibility for the entire route on 1 June 1971. The Wörth–Karlsruhe section was electrified in 1974. The Maxau Rhine Bridge had to be rebuilt after being damaged by a shipwreck in 1987. The new bridge was opened on 29 April 1991 as a single-track bridge.

=== Deutsche Bahn (since 1994) ===
In the course of the German rail reform, the line was transferred to Deutsche Bahn on 1 January 1994. This was followed in 1995 with the integration of the line into the fare area of the Karlsruher Verkehrsverbund (Karlsruhe transport association, KVV). Since 2001, there has been a transition fare of the Verkehrsverbund Rhein-Neckar (Rhine-Neckar transport association, VRN) on the Winden-Maximiliansau section. In the mid-1990s, two tracks were restored on the Wörth–Maximiliansau section for Stadtbahn operations. In 1997, the Maxau–Wörth section was integrated in the network of the Karlsruhe Stadtbahn and a line that had been built to the Wörth town centre starting to the west of the Wörth station began to be operated under the Karlsruhe model, especially Stadtbahn line S 5. To the east of Maxau, the Stadtbahn route is approximately the same as the old line used until 1938, and then, within Knielingen, uses a tram line from the 1950s.

In 1999, construction work began on a second bridge for a second track immediately adjacent to the existing Rhine crossing, as the bridge commissioned in 1991 had turned out to be a bottleneck. Double-track operations began on 12 May 2000. Operations were commissioned on Stadtbahn line S 51 and S 52 to Germersheim in 2010. While the S 52 service, like the S 5, only used the section between Wörth and the Betriebsbahnhof Rheinbrücke (Rhine bridge yard), the S 51 runs from Wörth on the Winden–Karlsruhe line to just before Karlsruhe Hauptbahnhof and then turns onto the connecting ramp to the Albtalbahnhof.

== Operations ==
=== Passenger services ===
In 1866, a total of 16 passenger trains passed over the line on workdays. In 1871, five pairs of trains operated on the Palatinate section, half of them as mixed trains. A trip from Winden to Maximiliansau took about three-quarters of an hour. The timetable of 1897 showed through services on the Bergzabern–Karlsruhe route. In the autumn of 1914, and thus during the First World War, there were six train-pairs, although one ran only between Maximiliansau and Winden. In the 1920s, a through coach also ran on the Cologne–Neustadt–Landau–Karlsruhe route, running from Landau as part of an express train. 32 passenger services operated over the Rhine from Monday to Friday in 1932.

The express services on the Saarbrücken–Munich route, which had previously run over the Germersheim–Landau railway, from 1938 ran via Winden and Karlsruhe. Already a year later, this line together with the Neustadt–Winden section of the Maximilian Railway was listed in the national timetable in table 243c. After the Battle of France, an express train for the civilian traffic ran from Karlsruhe to Dijon, which initially used this route, but later ran via Rastatt and Hagenau. The timetable of 1944 included some continuous local trains from Karlsruhe via Winden, Landau and Zweibrücken to Saarbrücken.

==== Post-war period and Deutsche Bundesbahn ====
Immediately after the Second World War, trains were reserved for the occupying forces and were closed to civilian traffic. Among them was a train connection running from Neustadt via Landau and Winden—initially due to the different national occupation zones, bypassing Karlsruhe by means of the curve that had been built in 1944—to Baden-Baden. Regular passenger trains operated between Landau and Wörth.

As early as 1953, Deutsche Bundesbahn operated fast trains from Cologne to Konstanz. Until the 1960s, services on the Krefeld–Basel route ran of this line. At the same time, it was used by express trains on the Saarbrücken–Munich route. Until 1973 there were still services on the Bingerbrück–Karlsruhe route, conveying through coaches to Basel, Krefeld and Saarbrücken. Durchgangszug expresses and through coaches ran on the line from Winden to Karlsruhe in 1988. Express trains ran approximately every hour on the Karlsruhe–Landau route as Regionalschnellbahnen (regional expresses, RSB) and every second of them continued to Neustadt.

==== Since the railway reform ====
The extension of the Karlsruhe Stadtbahn to Wörth was opened in 1997. Previously, Deutsche Bahn had operated a preliminary run in 1994 on the Karlsruhe–Wörth section. The Stadtbahn line was numbered S8.

Regional and excursion services on Sundays and public holidays from May to October
Name	Starting point	Terminus
Rheintal-Express	Karlsruhe	Koblenz
Felsenland-Express	Karlsruhe	Bundenthal-Rumbach

Together with the Neustadt–Winden section of the Maximilian Railway, the line is now part of Karlsruhe–Neustadt timetable route and is numbered KBS 676. Every hour there is one Regionalbahn service (RB 51) and one Regional-Express service (RE 6) from Karlsruhe to Neustadt. The Regionalbahn services from Karlsruhe to Neustadt all stop at the stations of Wörth Alte Bahnmeisterei, Maximiliansau Eisenbahnstraße and Maxau. The Regional-Express services since 1997 have run with only a few exceptions to Wörth, Kandel, Winden and Landau. Karlsruhe Stadtbahn lines S 5 (Wörth Dorschberg–Bietigheim-Bissingen) and S 52 (Germersheim – Karlsruhe Innenstadt) use the line between Wörth station and the junction to the east of Maxau. They also serve Maximiliansau Eisenbahnstraße and Maxau halts on the line. Line S 51 (Germersheim–Karlsruhe Innenstadt) also runs on the route from Wörth to shortly before Karlsruhe Hauptbahnhof, however these services do not serve Maximiliansau Eisenbahnstraße and Maxau.

=== Freight ===
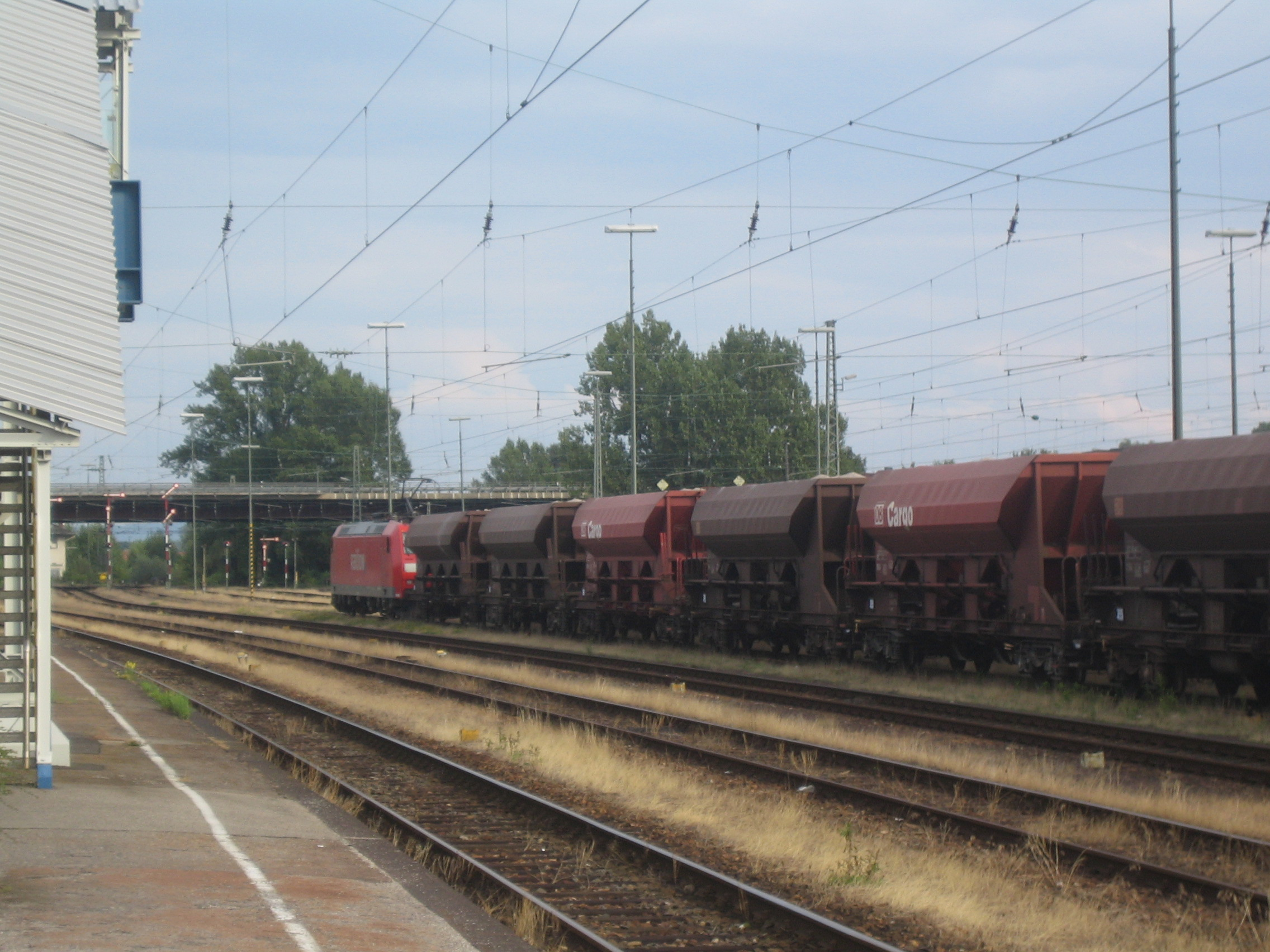
Goods train in Wörth (Rhein) station

In the first years of its existence, the line from Winden to Karlsruhe mainly served the coal transport to Southern Germany. After the commissioning of the Rhine Bridge at Germersheim in 1877, it lost a large part of this traffic. In 1871, four freight only trains ran, three towards Winden and one towards Maximiliansau. Two of them skipped Wörth and one skipped Kandel, the rest served all the stations on the line.

Above all the stations of Winden and Kandel used to have importance for the transport of sugar beet. In the 1980s, this traffic was handled at Landau. Correspondingly, they each had a facility for loading sugar beet onto freight wagons. At the beginning of the 1990s, Deutsche Bundesbahn rationalised these operations, which meant that the beet traffic changed to road transport. Accordingly, the freight lines were later dismantled. The rest of this section of the line is served from Karlsruhe.

Between Karlsruhe and Wörth, a large amount of freight is transported to the recreational lakes in former quarries (baggerseen) around Wörth, the Mercedes-Benz plant in Wörth and the Rhine harbour in Wörth; as a result this section was electrified in 1974. Connecting lines branch off from the Karlsruhe-Rheinbrücke operating station to the MiRO oil refinery and to a Stora Enso paper factory. The former line is also electrified. Therefore, the freight trains running to the oil refinery are usually electrically hauled, as is freight transport to Wörth. The freight operations of the former Karlsruhe-Mühlburg station have been abandoned, so it has been reclassified as a Haltepunkt (halt), which means that it does not have any set of points. The once numerous sidings of Karlsruhe West station have all been dismantled and Karlsruhe-Knielingen station now also has no sidings.

== Rolling stock ==
Since the Rhine bridge between Karlsruhe and Wörth was initially a pontoon bridge, locomotives of class T 2.I were specially used to cross the river. After the Second World War, Uerdingen railbuses took over some of the services.

The first tilting trains of class 611 were used for the Regional-Express services on the Neustadt–Karlsruhe route. Since these were very unreliable, they were only used a few years and later class 612 sets were used. Siemens Desiro Classic (class 642) trains are now used. Regionalbahn services were operated from the 1980s until December 2010 with class 628 diesel multiple units, which had replaced the Uerdingen railbuses previously used. The class 628 sets were replaced by Bombardier Talent (class 643) sets, which are still used.

In Stadtbahn operations. Electric multiple units of classes GT8-100C/2S, GT8-100D/2S-M and ET 2010 are used.

== Route ==
The Winden–Karlsruhe section runs to Kandel through an agricultural area and between Kandel and Wörth it crosses the Bienwald. After crossing the Rhine Bridge (until 1938 a pontoon bridge), it passes through Rheinauen and, since 1938, the south-western outskirts of Knielingen, while previously it had run through the centre of the Karlsruhe district. The former Hardt Railway (Hardtbahn) connects with the line and they run together to Karlsruhe-Mühlburg station. A single track line branched off in Karlsruhe West station to the Karlsruhe freight bypass railway (Güterumgehungsbahn Karlsruhe). Afterwards, the line runs around the Bulach district, before it ends at Karlsruhe Hauptbahnhof.

From Winden to Maximiliansau Eisenbahnstraße, the line passes through the Rhineland-Palatinate district of Germersheim and the remaining section is located within the Baden-Württemberg city of Karlsruhe.

== Operating points ==
=== Winden (Pfalz) ===
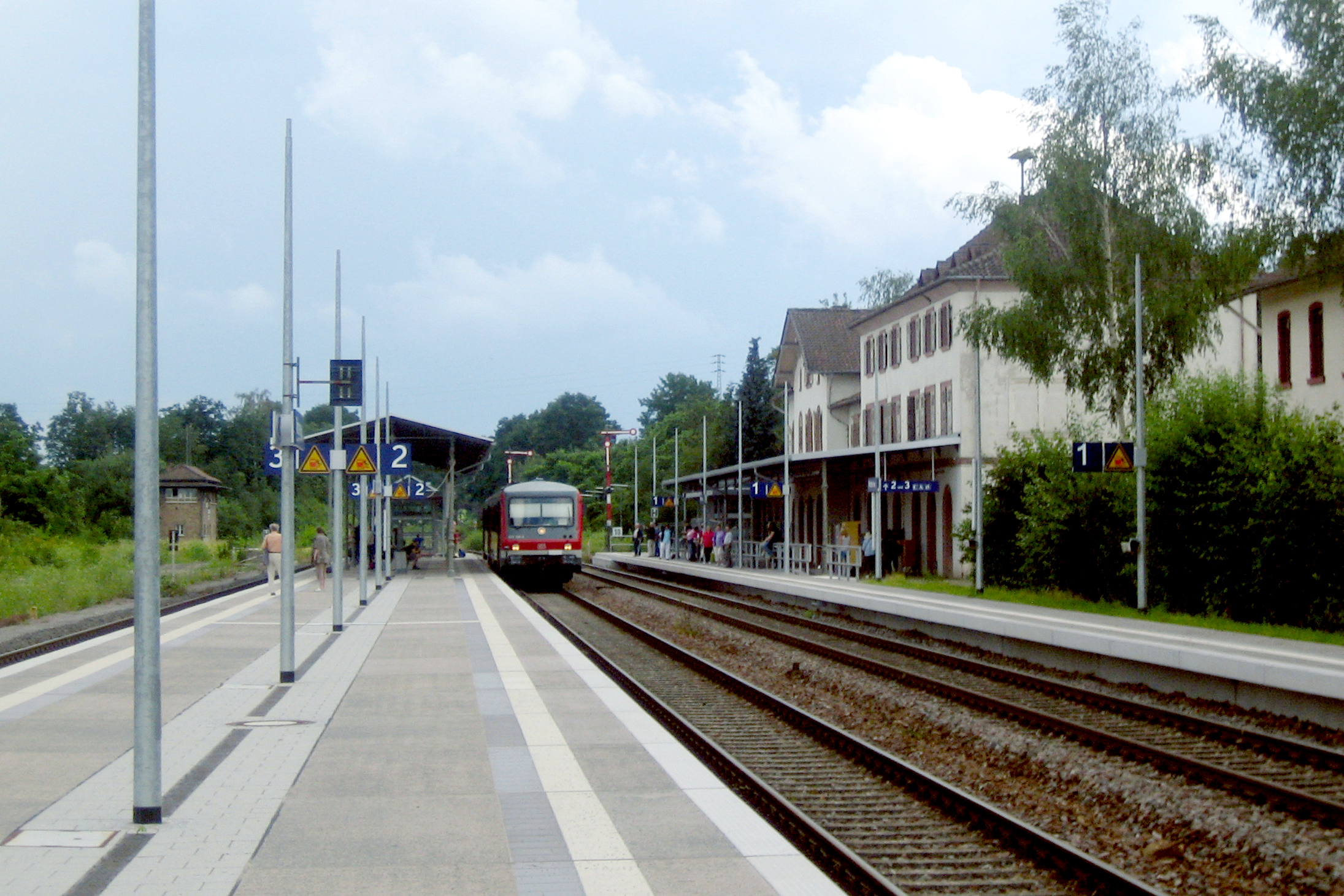
Winden station after its modernisation in 2007

Winden (Pfalz) station is located on the south-eastern outskirts of the municipality of Winden. It was put into operation with the opening of the Palatine Maximilian Railway in 1855. From 1864 the line to Maximiliansau was added. Thus the station was the fifth railway junction to be established within the Palatinate after Schifferstadt (1847), Ludwigshafen (1853), Neustadt an der Haardt (1855) and Homburg (1857). In 1870 the Winden–Bad Bergzabern railway was opened. It was modernised from 2005 to 2007. The entrance building is a protected monument.

The line begins at the southernmost point of the station.

=== Kandel ===
Kandel station is located near the centre of Kandel. Trains heading for Winden usually stop on platform 1 next to the entrance building and trains to Wörth stop on platform 2, the main through track. The entrance building is a protected monument.

=== Wörth Mozartstraße ===
Wörth Mozartstraße is a "halt" (Haltepunkt) located near the centre of Wörth am Rhein, which went into operation in March 2009. Originally it was planned to erect a station for Regionalbahn services at the end of the town centre, which is located on the north-western outskirts of the city, in order to allow a change between Stadtbahn and Regionalbahn services. However, the town of Wörth favoured a more central station, which was eventually built.

=== Wörth (Rhein) Alte Bahnmeisterei ===
Wörth Alte Bahnmeisterei "station part" (Bahnhofsteil) is administered as part of the station of Wörth station. It was opened in 1997 with the commissioning of the Wörth inner-city Stadtbahn line, which is located here, and is located on the former Bahnmeisterei (the office of the supervisor of track maintenance) of Wörth station. The AVG-operated station has one 38 centimetre-high and 80 metre-long island platform and is exclusively served by line S 5 of the Karlsruhe Stadtbahn.

=== Wörth (Rhein) ===
Wörth (Rhein) station is located to the east of the centre of Wörth. It is a railway junction and the largest station on the line between Winden and Karlsruhe. It has five platforms and nine tracks without platforms, which mainly serve as sidings for freight. Since 1876, railway lines have branched off to Germersheim and Schifferstadt and to Lauterbourg and Strasbourg. Since 1997, a Stadtbahn line has also branched off into the inner town of Wörth. The entrance building is a protected monument.

The Winden–Karlsruhe line here has two tracks from set of points no. 5 and they form platform tracks 3 and 4. At the eastern end of the station, the line crosses the Schifferstadt–Strasboug line.

=== Maximiliansau ===
Maximiliansau station existed from 1864 to 1938 and was located on the old railway line that was abandoned during the construction of a fixed Rhine bridge in favour of a route further south. Its entrance building stood perpendicular to the direction of travel and was demolished at the beginning of the Second World War. The railway tracks descended towards Wörth.

=== Maximiliansau West ===
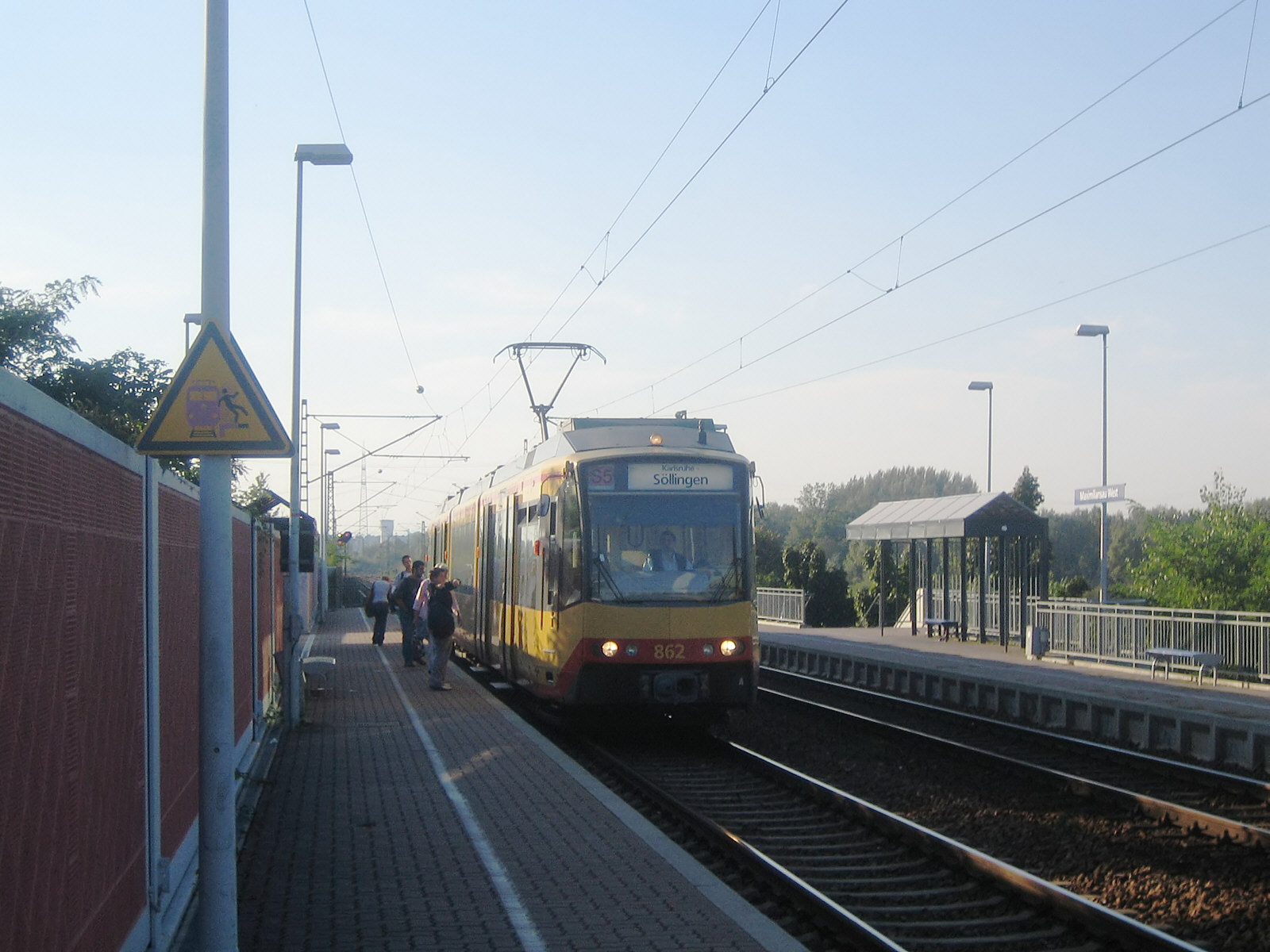
Stadtbahn service in Maximiliansau West

Maximiliansau West halt was put into operation during the installation of the second track on the line between Wörth and the Rheinbrücke in May 1996. It is located on the north-western edge of Maximiliansau. It is operated by the AVG and includes two 38 centimetre-high and 119 metre-long outside platforms.

=== Maximiliansau Eisenbahnstraße ===
Maximiliansau Eisenbahnstraße halt was put into operation in 1938 in the course of the realignment of the line between Wörth and Mühlburg and was initially called Maximiliansau. It is located on the north-eastern edge of the town. During the installation of the second track on the line between Wörth and the Rhine bridge in the mid-1990s and the accompanying opening of the Maximiliansau West station, it was given its present name and was equipped with an additional platform. It is operated by AVG and comprises two 38 centimetre-high and 120 or 132 metre-long outer platforms.

The station—in contrast to the similar Maximiliansau West station—is within walking distance of the Globus-Baumarkt Wörth and the Maximiliancenter shopping centre and has been served by the Stadtbahn since 2009. This station is served exclusively by Stadtbahn services. All other trains pass through the stop without stopping.

=== Maxau ===
Maxau halt (sometimes referred to as Karlsruhe-Maxau by the Karlsruhe Stadtbahn) is located immediately east of the Rhine bridge and mainly serves excursion traffic. This is served only by Stadtbahn line S5 and individual services of lines S51 and S52 at the beginning and end of the day. The station was originally called Maxau, before it was renamed Karlsruhe-Maxau on 3 April 1938. Yet on 15 May of the same year it was given the new name of Karlsruhe Rheinbrücke. Due to poor receipts, it was abandoned in the meantime, until it was revived under the name of Maxau in 1997. Today, the station is owned and operated by AVG. It includes two 120 metre-long outside platforms: 38 centimetres high on platform 1 and 55 centimetres high on platform 2.

=== Karlsruhe Rheinbrücke ===
Karlsruhe Rheinbrücke station is an "operations station" (Betriebsbahnhof), not a passenger station. Here, the line that connects with the tramline through Knielingen, as well as a line operated entirely by the city of Karlsruhe, which branches off to the MiRO oil refinery. In addition, a connecting track to the packaging manufacturer Stora Enso (formerly Papierfabrik Holtzmann) branches off the current track 16. Since the Maxau Rhine Bridge was only single-track from 1991 to 2000, it was the end of the single-track section at this time. The station's signalling and points are controlled remotely by an interlocking of the Sp-Dr-S60 class in Karlsruhe West.

=== Karlsruhe-Knielingen ===
Karlsruhe-Knielingen station Is located on the southern outskirts of the original village and what is now the Karlsruhe district of Knielingen. It has existed since 1938, after the original railway line running through the town centre was abandoned, including the former railway station. At its southernmost point, the Hardt Railway branches off towards the north-east.

=== Karlsruhe-Mühlburg ===
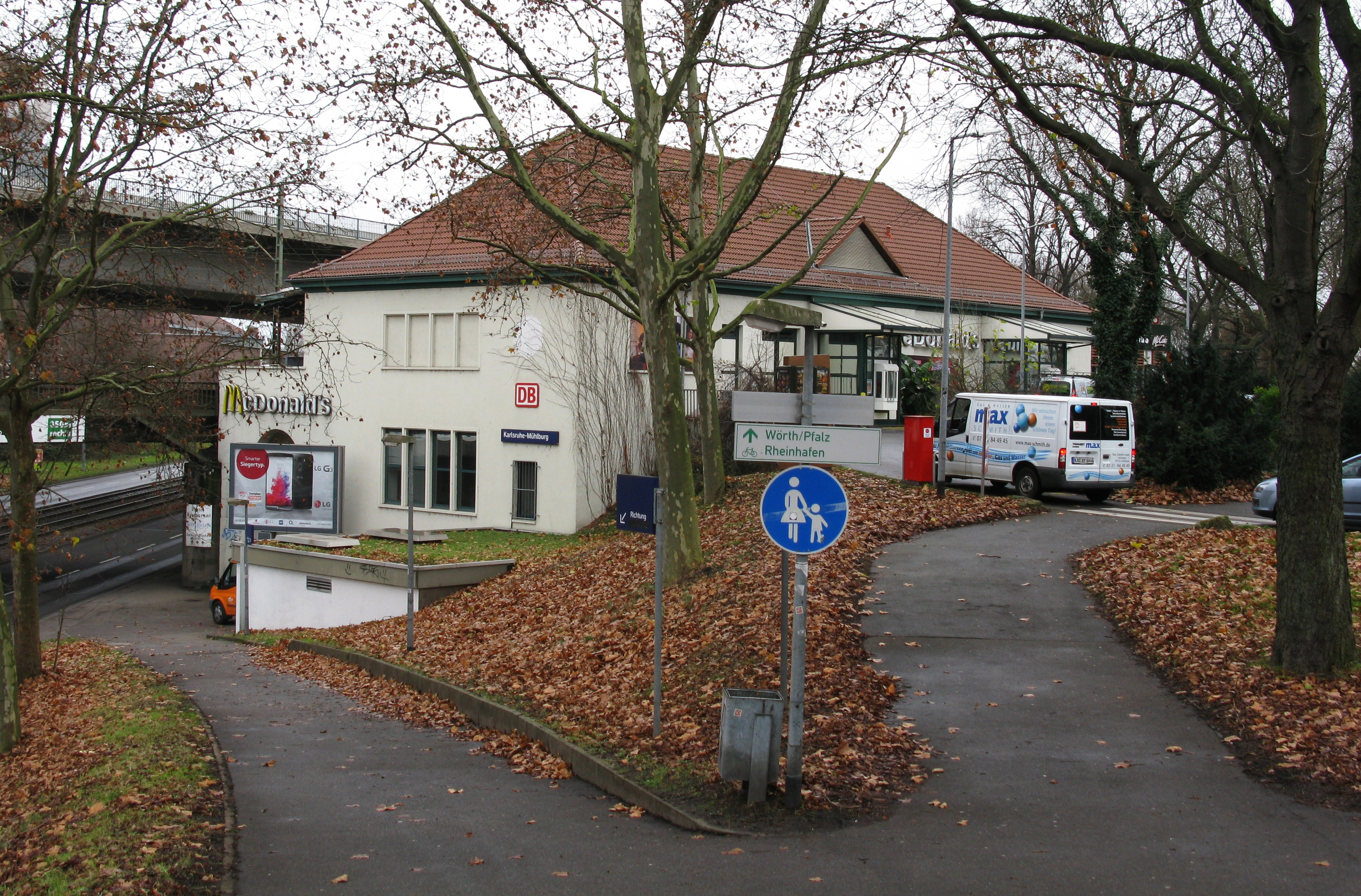
Karlsruhe-Mühlburg station

Karlsruhe-Mühlburg station, like the former Karlsruhe-Mühlburg station, is located in the west of the Karlsruhe district of Mühlburg. It replaced the old station when the railway connection was opened in 1913 between Knielingen and the relocated Karlsruhe Hauptbahnhof.

=== Karlsruhe West ===
Karlsruhe West station was opened in 1895 as part of the Karlsruhe freight bypass railway (Güterumgehungsbahn Karlsruhe) to the new Karlsruhe marshalling yard. As the line from Winden had to be realigned from Knielingen during the building of the new Karlsruhe Hauptbahnhof, the new station was given the name Karlsruhe Zeppelinstraße. This was renamed Karlsruhe West on 3 April 1938. In addition there is a temporary platform at Karlsruhe West station on track 108, which is used for construction work.

=== Karlsruhe Hauptbahnhof ===
Karlsruhe Hauptbahnhof has existed in its present form since 1913 and replaced the original station on the edge of the city centre. Trains on the line to and from Winden end and begin today alternately on tracks 1, 101 and 102. The latter two tracks are part of a four-track terminal station (Maxaubahnhof) built specifically for the traffic to the Palatinate. Its tracks 103 and 104 were closed during a redevelopment of the station in the middle of the 2000s.

At the southern entrance to the station the line has crossed the ramp to the Albtalbahnhof since 1996.

== Planning ==
Currently the construction of a further station is planned on the line as Kandel West. The electrification of the entire line is proposed at the earliest in 2025, as is the double tracking of the Winden–Wörth section. The state of Rhineland-Palatinate has proposed these measures for the federal transport plan (Bundesverkehrswegeplan) 2015.

The Überprüfung der Bedarfspläne für Schienenwege ("checking the requirements for railways") of the Federal Ministry of Transport, which was published on 11 November 2010, mentions the construction of a connecting route between Rastatt and Karlsruhe West as item PF25 (upgrade of the Mannheim node). The overall project is given a benefit-cost ratio of 3.5.

== Sources ==
=== Further reading ===
- Michael Heilmann; Werner Schreiner (2005). 150 Jahre Maximiliansbahn Neustadt-Straßburg (in German). Ludwigshafen am Rhein: pro MESSAGE. ISBN 3-934845-27-4.
- Modell- und Eisenbahnclub Landau in der Pfalz e. V. (1980). 125 Jahre Maximiliansbahn Neustadt/Weinstr.-Landau/Pfalz (in German). Landau in der Pfalz.
- Klaus D. Holzborn (1993). Eisenbahn-Reviere Pfalz (in German). Berlin: transpress. ISBN 3-344-70790-6.
- Albert Mühl (1982). Die Pfalzbahn. Geschichte, Betrieb und Fahrzeuge der Pfälzischen Eisenbahnen (in German). Stuttgart: Theiss Verlag. ISBN 3-8062-0301-6.
- Andreas M. Räntzsch (1997). Die Eisenbahnen in der Pfalz (in German). Schweinfurt: Wolfgang Bleiweis. ISBN 3-928786-61-X.
- Heinz Sturm (2005). Die pfälzischen Eisenbahnen (in German). Ludwigshafen am Rhein: pro MESSAGE. ISBN 3-934845-26-6.
- Hansjürgen Wenzel (1976). Die Südwestdeutschen Eisenbahnen in der französischen Zonen (SWDE) (in German). Wuppertal: EK-Verlag. ISBN 3-88255-821-0.
