= Maxau Rhine Bridges =

Rhine Bridge, Maxau (road bridge) Rheinbrücke Maxau
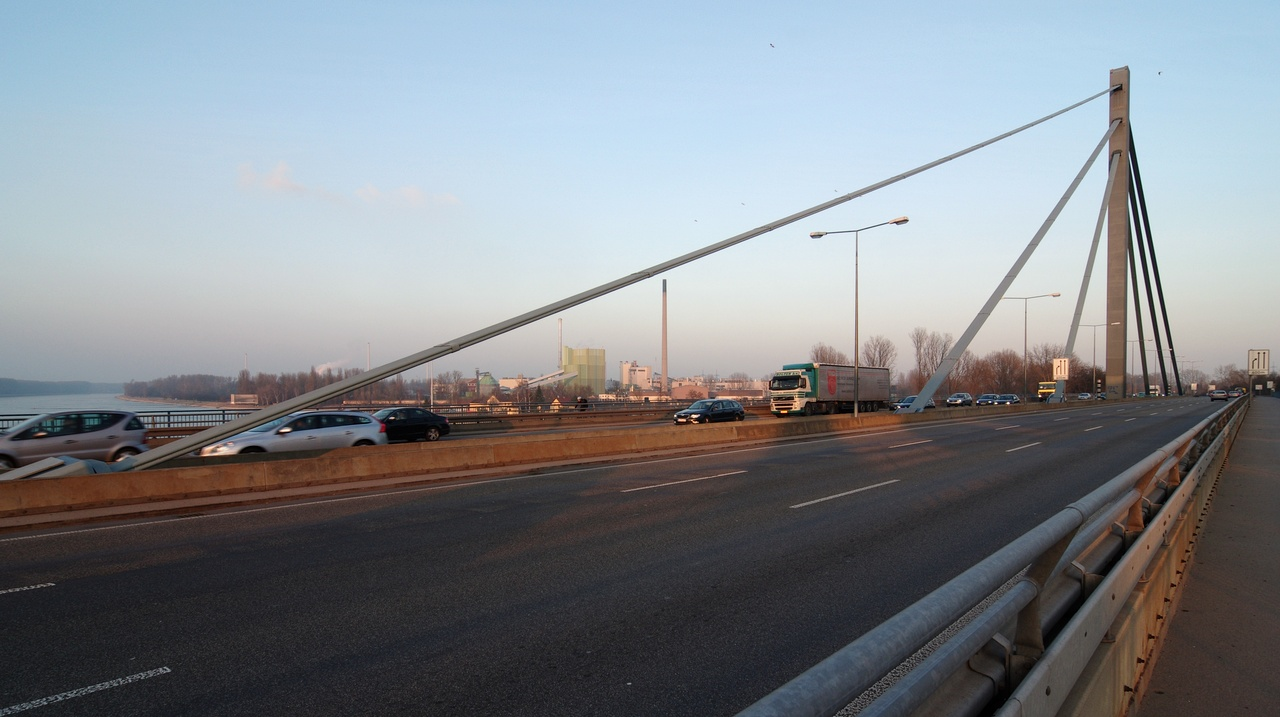
- Coordinates: 49°2′13″N 8°18′12″E
- Carries: Bundesstraße 10
- Crosses: Rhine
- Locale: Karlsruhe, Baden-Württemberg, Germany; Wörth am Rhein, Rhineland-Palatinate

Characteristics
- Design: Cable-stayed bridge
- Total length: 292 m (958 ft)
- Width: 35.30 m (116 ft)
- Longest span: 175 m (574 ft)

History
- Opened: December 1966

Statistics
- Daily traffic: 78500

The Maxau Rhine Bridges (Rheinbrücken Maxau) connect the Baden-Württemberg city of Karlsruhe and the Rhineland-Palatinate town of Wörth in Germany. They cross the Rhine in the suburb of Maxau in the Karlsruhe district of Knielingen and the Wörth suburb of Maximiliansau. The Hofgut Maxau (Maxau estate), established by Maximilian von Baden (1796–1882), younger son of Charles Frederick, Grand Duke of Baden, that Maxau is named after is located on the east bank of the Rhine near the bridge. Today there are two parallel bridge structures for road and rail traffic.

== Modern bridges ==
=== Road bridge ===
The road bridge carries Federal highway 10 over the Rhine. It connects the Wörth interchange (Wörther Kreuz), which is at the end of Autobahn 65, with the Karlsruhe urban freeway designated as the Südtangente (south tangent), which connects to Autobahn 5. According to a survey conducted in the first half of 2005, around 78,500 motor vehicles use the bridge daily. It has therefore been a traffic bottleneck for years.

The building, designed by Wilhelm Tiedje in architectural terms, is a 292 m long cable-stayed bridge with semi-fan system. The 48 metre-high pylon, which is supported by a central pillar, divides the bridge asymmetrically into two sections, 175 metres and 117 metres long. The steel bridge superstructure has a deck depth of 3.00 metres and with a width of 35.30 metres accommodates two three-lane carriageways with footpaths and bicycle lanes on both sides. The road bridge was opened in December 1966.

=== Rail bridge ===
Rhine Bridge, Maxau (rail bridge) Rheinbrücke Maxau
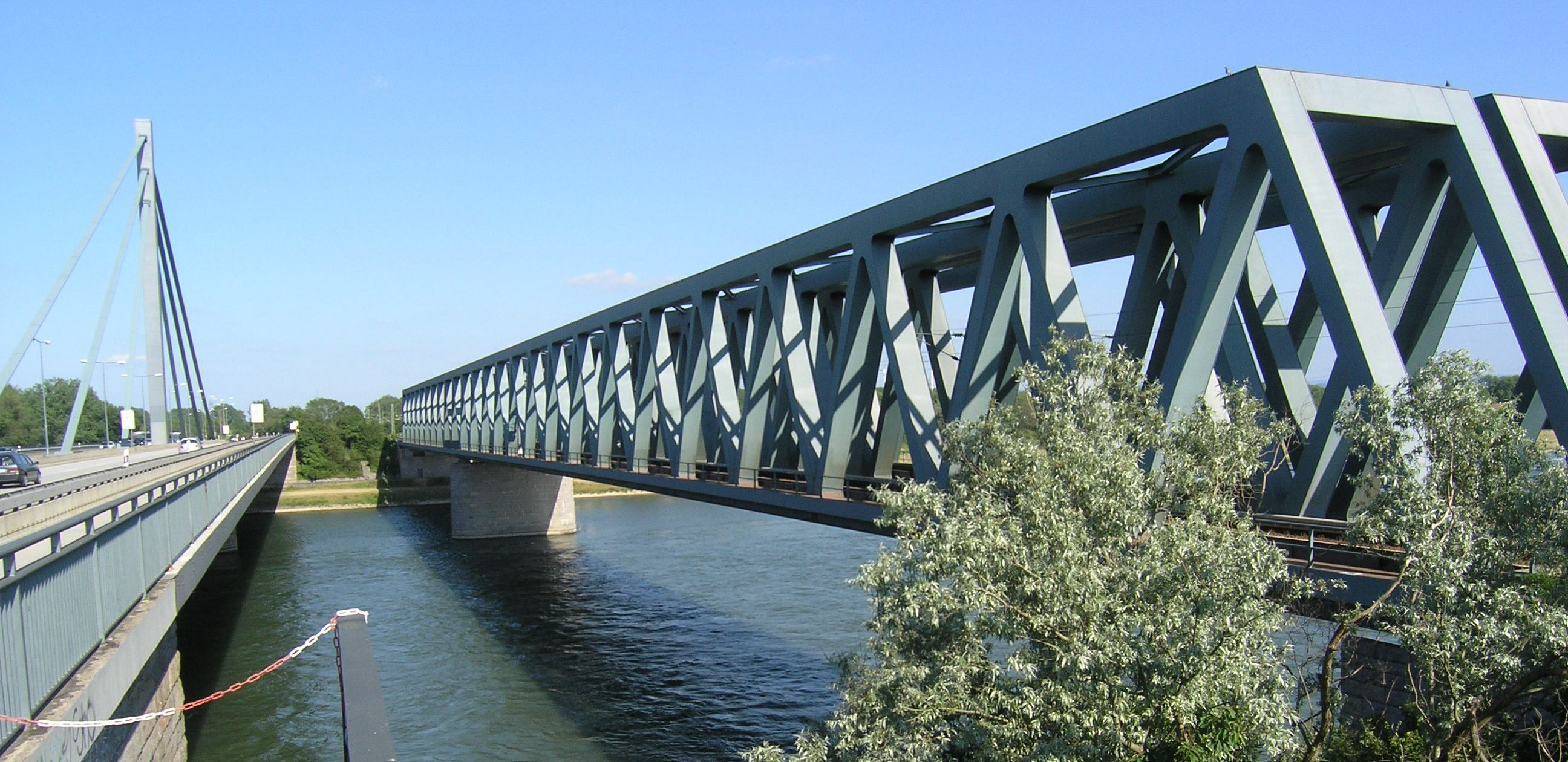
- Coordinates: 49°02′12″N 8°18′12″E
- Carries: Winden–Karlsruhe railway
- Crosses: Rhine
- Locale: Karlsruhe, North Rhine-Westphalia, Germany; Wörth am Rhein, Rhineland-Palatinate

Characteristics
- Design: Steel truss bridge
- Total length: 292 m (958 ft)
- Longest span: 175 m (574 ft)

History
- Opened: 29 April 1991 (1st track); 12 May 2000 (2nd track)

The two-track railway bridge of the Winden–Karlsruhe railway is located a few metres south of the road bridge. It was opened on 29 April 1991 as a single-track bridge and upgraded in 2000 with additional superstructure to support a second track and put into operation on 12 May 2000.

The railway bridge consists of two parallel sections of welded superstructures of steel truss construction, both 292 metres long, resting on a common central pillar. The pillarless trusses have a system height of 12.00 metres and have a through truss in the longitudinal direction. As with the road bridge, the pier divides the bridge asymmetrically into two sections that are 117 metres and 175 metres long.

== Earlier bridges ==
=== Pontoon bridge of 1840 ===
Today's bridges at Maxau are the fifth and sixth bridges to be built at this location since the first crossing of the Rhine in 1840.

The first bridge over the Rhine near Maxau was opened on 25 August 1840 as a floating bridge for road traffic. It consisted of 34 hulls floating on the Rhine, supporting balks on which the road was mounted. It had a length of 276 m and a load capacity of 4 t. Individual balks could be withdrawn in order to allow the passage of ships and rafts.

=== Pontoon bridge of 1865 ===
The construction of the Maxau Railway (Maxaubahn) in 1862 made it necessary to erect a new bridge for the railway which connects the Maxau Railway between Karlsruhe and Maxau with a newly created branch of the Palatine Maximilian (Pfälzischen Maximiliansbahn) on the Winden–Wörth–Maximiliansau route. For the first time in Europe, this mixed railway and road bridge was constructed as a pontoon bridge. As a technical pioneer, it was awarded a gold medal in 1867 at the Paris International Exposition. The new bridge replaced the structure of 1840. Until the Germersheim Rhine Bridge took over the freight traffic in 1877, considerable quantities of the Saar coal crossed the Rhine here to reach southern Germany.

This bridge had a total length of 363 m, of which 234 m was on the actual bridge and 129 m was on the two access ramps. It consisted of 34 pontoons, on which 12 balks supporting the railway were mounted. Six of the railway balks could be withdrawn for the passage of ships. The road was divided into two lanes by the central railway track.

Depending on the water level of the Rhine, the height of the bridge varied at the crossing of the bank, which also changed the slope of the bridge: in low water, the bridge was lower than the shores, so that the trains on the bridge had a maximum incline of 3.5% to climb; on the other hand, the bridge was higher than the shores at high water, so that a climb of a maximum of 3.3% had to be overcome. The low load-bearing capacity of 101 t required the use of special, particularly light locomotives, Brückenlokomotiven (bridge locomotives) with a 22 t service weight. Trains with a maximum of five wagons were hauled over the bank and across the Rhine by a bridge locomotive and returned to a normal locomotive on the other bank. Since the bridge locomotives only had limited power, problems could arise at times of low water if the bridge locomotive was unable to pull the train off the bridge over the steep incline to the bank. During the operation of trains over the bridge, it was closed for road traffic for about two hours. There were five continuous pairs of trains each day in the 1925 timetable.

When there was ice on the Rhine, the pontoon bridge had to be dismantled for safety reasons and towed into the harbour.

=== Rhine bridge of 1938 ===
The technical and operational inadequacies of the pontoon bridge – disruption of shipping, low carrying capacity and costly operation – led to the construction of the first fixed bridge at Maxau in the 1930s. The inauguration of the new bridge was celebrated on 17 January 1938 (road bridge) and on 3 April 1938 (rail bridge). The bridge had a central pillar, the structure was divided into two spans that were 175 m and 117 m long. It had two superstructures in steel truss construction: one superstructure, which accommodated the two-track railway line, and one superstructure for the road. The new Rhine bridge was damaged in 1945 at the end of the Second World War during an air raid. On 21 March 1945, an American artillery grenade hit a detonator and thereby triggered the demolition of the bridge prepared by German troops (see Operation Undertone).

=== Rhine bridge of 1947 ===
After the destruction of the bridge of 1938, several short-term temporary structures were built in Maxau, initially in the form of a pontoon bridge built by the French armed forces for road traffic. This was replaced after a short time by another pontoon bridge, which was laid somewhat further upstream. In 1946, a low wooden bridge was added for the railway, which linked the two shores at the location of the old pontoon bridge of 1865. However, it could not be passed by shipping on the Rhine. These provisional bridges remained in operation until the 1947 bridge was put into operation.

As a long-term replacement for the bridge destroyed in 1945, a new bridge was built south of the 1938 site at the end of the war. It was built on four electric pylons, which were supported by a large number of steel pipes which had been driven into the ground. Steel superstructures built on trusses carried a railway track and the roadway. After the construction of the new road bridge of 1966, the deck of the roadway was dismantled and only the deck of the railway remained until 1991.

There were five spans between the four pylons of the bridge, each with a passage for river traffic to pass up and down. The very narrow width of the spans soon became an obstacle to navigation. So on 9 June 1987, there was a major shipwreck in which the pier of one of the bridges was rammed; a vessel sank. In order for the vessel to be recovered and the bridge to be tested for stability, the railway traffic on the bridge and navigation on the Rhine had to be interrupted for several weeks.

== New plans ==
There had been plans for the construction of a second road bridge across the Rhine near Maxau for several years. The increasing traffic is one reason, but there is also the expected need to rehabilitate the cable-stayed bridge built in 1966, which requires the closure of the bridge in the longer-term. Therefore, the refurbishment is expected to require the prior construction of a second Rhine bridge.

In the spatial planning procedure, which was completed in June 2006, option I, which is a few kilometres north of the existing bridge site, was considered as well as option II in the immediate vicinity of the existing bridge. The decision of the Struktur- und Genehmigungsdirektion Süd ("Structure and authorisation directorate south", a regional body of Rhineland Palatinate) in Neustadt an der Weinstraße favoured a modified option I: the link to B 9 in the west would partly run over the route of today's district route 25 (Wörther Hafenstraße). A small forest area would be crossed on low pillars, in order to maintain existing animal migrations paths and biotopes.

The approach on the Palatine side is problematic in both options because of the dense settlement next to the Rhine: The approach to option II would be a viaduct through the residential area of Maximiliansau. There were two proposals from the Landesbetrieb Mobilität Rheinland-Pfalz (Rhineland-Palatinate state authority for mobility) for the connection from option I to the west and one produced by a citizens initiative. There was also controversy in relation to the planned Karlsruhe north tangent road as well as the connection to the existing south tangent road.

On 26 April 2011, the plans were submitted for the planning approval process. The Karlsruhe town council decided by majority to issue a negative opinion on the planning on 24 May 2011. An alliance of around 30 nature conservation associations and citizens' associations from Karlsruhe and the South Palatinate rejected the planning and identified more than 100 serious shortcomings and demanded improvements. An action plan called Per Ersatzbrücke Maxau ("by replacement bridge Maxau"), on the other hand, called for replacing the old bridge with a new bridge. In order to clarify open questions and to resolve information deficits, the two new state governments agreed to carry out a fact check on 18 and 22 November 2011 in Karlsruhe and to the subsequent establishment of a working group called Leistungsfähige Rheinquerung ("Efficient Rhine crossing"), which ended in November 2012. Results of both exercises were published on the Internet.

The discussions were held in the Rhineland-Palatinate planning approval process on 3 and 4 July 2013 in Wörth and for the Baden-Württemberg planning approval process in Karlsruhe on 9, 10 and 11 July 2013. The city of Karlsruhe and the nature conservation associations criticised the numerous deficiencies in nature conservation, problems of capacity and traffic safety on the Baden side, problems for bicycle traffic, inadequate variation of weightings in the assessment system and the division into two procedures with inadequate overall consideration of the traffic and nature conservation issues. This advocacy led to the separation of, on the one hand, the study of traffic issues on the Palatinate side and increased capacity and improved road safety from, on the other hand, security against the failure of the Rhine crossing in the case of road or shipping accidents. One day before the discussion, Federal Minister of Transport Peter Ramsauer visited the bridge and described it as "the worst bottleneck in Germany".

The states of Baden-Württemberg and Rhineland-Palatinate have approved the construction of a second Rhine bridge designated as B 293. Baden-Württemberg has also designated a replacement bridge on the route of the B 10 for the Bundesverkehrswegeplan (federal transport plan). An investigation carried out by the Landesbetrieb Mobilität Speyer at the request of the government of Baden-Württemberg showed that a new bridge between the old road bridge and the railway bridge was not possible. Moreover, this option was subject to natural environmental conditions on the Baden-Württemberg side.

The Federal Court of Audit has found the project to be neither necessary nor economic, because the traffic problem it seeks to resolve is the result of a bottleneck in Karlsruhe not at the Rhine bridge.

== See also ==
- List of bridges over the Rhine
