= Manitonquat =

American author (1929–2018)

Medicine Story
- Born: Francis Story Talbot; July 17, 1929; Massachusetts, United States
- Died: July 21, 2018 (aged 89)
- Writing career
- Pen name: Manitonquat

Manitonquat (AKA Medicine Story; born Francis Story Talbot, July 17, 1929, died July 21, 2018) was an American author of two books, and several more self-published booklets on New Age philosophy, spirituality, and community sociology. He has led workshops and rituals at the Rainbow Gatherings held by the Rainbow Family. Since the 1970s, he has toured the United States and Europe teaching and lecturing on the adaptation of the application of philosophy to modern problems of society, community, and relationships.

Manitonquat was a member of the Assonet Band, a nonprofit corporation created in 1990 and based in New Bedford, Massachusetts. The group asserts a connection with the Wampanoag Nation but is not recognized by the state or Federal Government as a tribe, and has been criticized for not requiring proof of Wampanoag heritage as a condition of membership. Manitonquat states in his biographical notes and publicity materials that he is a spiritual elder of the band. He was associated with the prominent German intentional community ZEGG and the "peace research village" Tamera in Portugal.

== Teachings ==
Manitonquat taught that individualistic society is a source of unhappiness, and that cities are dehumanizing for their residents. He argued that it is better to live in small groups, with each group able to define its own rules and practices. He advocated for self-sufficient and environmentally-friendly communities.

He said "We're creating another world... The basic thing is: We're all equal. The basic thing is: We love this world we're on. We are the next spiritual transformation of humankind."

== Rainbow Gatherings ==
Manitonquat had described his involvement in early Rainbow Gatherings as being important to the development of his beliefs. Describing an early gathering, he said "People stayed together all day on that mountain. We fasted and remained in silence until, sometime after noon, someone started singing an Arapaho chant. All of us took up that chant to honor the traditional caretakers of that land. When we left that gathering everyone had the feeling that something very important had happened, and was happening all over the world".

== Works ==
- Return to Creation: a survival manual for native and natural people, Bear Tribe Publishing, Spokane, Washington (First Edition, July 1991). 188 pages, 22 cm. ISBN 9780943404202
- The Children of the Morning Light: Wampanoag tales with Mary F. Arquette, Simon & Schuster Children's Publishing (April 1994). 72 pages, color illustrations, 27 cm. ISBN 9780027659054
- Ending violent crime: a report of a prison program that is working and a vision of a society free of violence, Story Stone Publishing (1996). 75 pages, 22 cm. (also eBook) ISBN 9781456584825
- The Circle Way, Story Stone Publishing / self-published (1997) 90 pages.
- The original instructions: reflections of an elder on the teachings of the elders, adapting ancient wisdom to the twenty-first century, Story Stone Publishing. AuthorHouse (2009). 165 pages, 23 cm. ISBN 978-1438980799
- Have you lost your tribe? The paradise on Earth now under construction - Welcome home. Story Stone Publishing. (2011) 378 pages, 22 cm, ISBN 9781461115120
- Thanksgiving Day : let's meet the Wampanoags and the Pilgrims. with Barbara DeRubertis, Thomas Sperling, Adolfo Troncoso and Carol Cucumber. New York, Kane Press. 1992 and 1996 editions. Audio tape + book (32 pages color, 24 cm.). ISBN 0791519139.
