= ZEGG =

ZEGG may refer to:

- ZEGG (band), a Raleigh, North Carolina–based band formed in 2004
- ZEGG (community), an experimental ecovillage near Berlin, Germany
