= Francis Talbot =

Francis Talbot may refer to:

- Francis Talbot, 5th Earl of Shrewsbury (1500–1560), son of George Talbot, 4th Earl of Shrewsbury and Anne Hastings
- Francis Talbot, 11th Earl of Shrewsbury (1623–1668), English peer, second son of the 10th Earl of Shrewsbury
- Francis X. Talbot (1889–1953), American Jesuit publisher and academic administrator
- Manitonquat (1929–2018), Francis Talbot a.k.a. "Manitonquat" a.k.a. "Medicine Story", American New Age author and lecturer

== See also ==
- Frances Talbot (disambiguation)
