= Biotopes of national importance in Switzerland =

Protected habitats in Switzerland

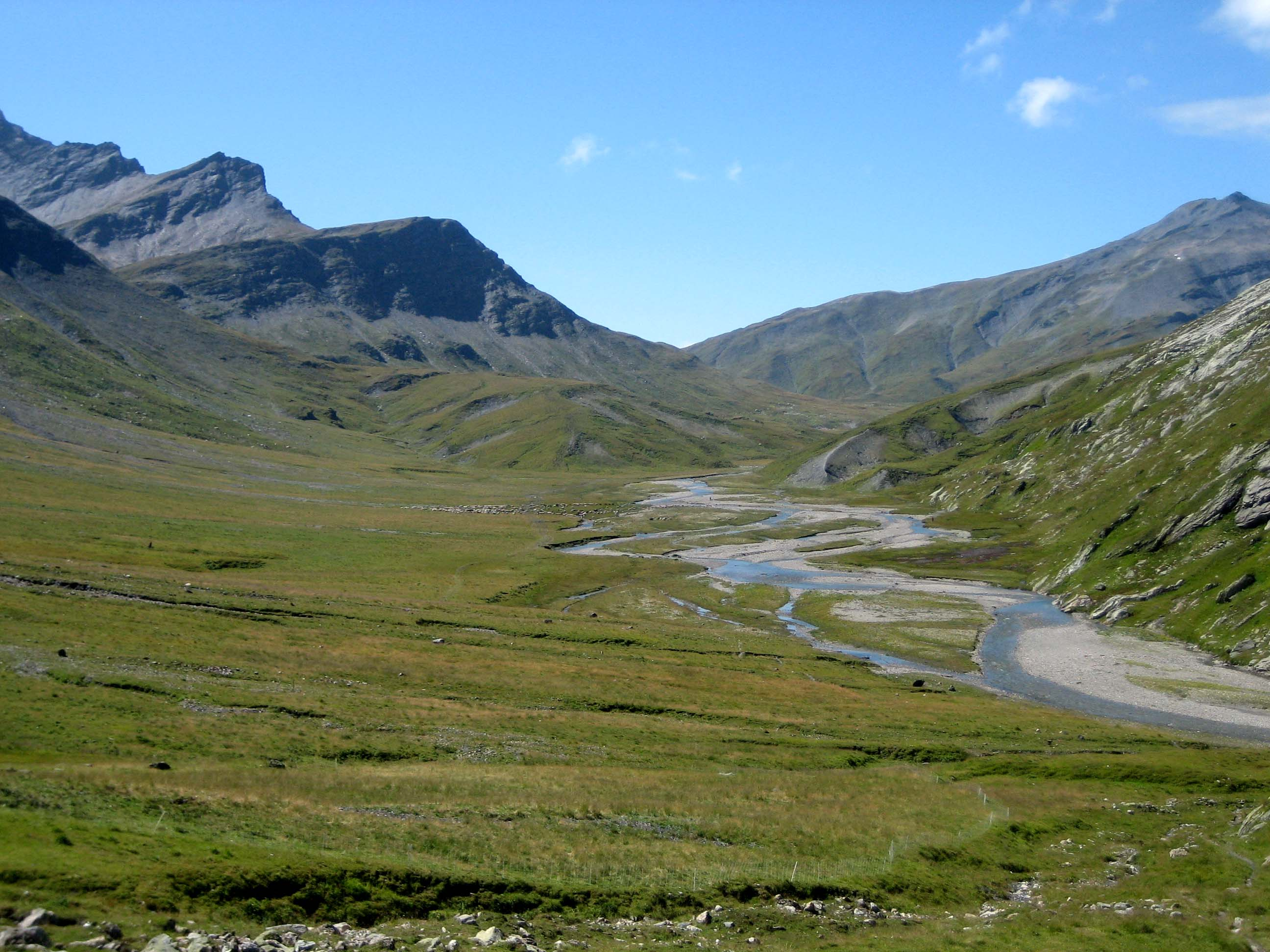
Floodplain and low moors of national importance in the Greina (GR, Switzerland)

The biotopes of national importance in Switzerland are particularly valuable biotopes. They are often ecosystems under threat and require specific protection. In addition to their value, the biotopes must be “sufficiently extensive habitats”, according to the Swiss Federal Act on the Protection of Nature and Cultural Heritage. The actual size varies with the needs and the mobility of the species present.

There are five categories of biotopes of national importance: peat bog and transitional moors, low-level moors, floodplain areas, amphibian spawning areas, dry meadows and pastures.

== Legal basis of biotope protection ==
In Swiss law, biotopes are regulated by articles 18-18d of the Federal Act of 1 July 1966 on the Protection of Nature and Cultural Heritage (NCHA). More specifically, biotopes of national importance are regulated by article 18a NCHA. This article is part of the section on protecting fauna and flora (Art. 18 - 23, NCHA). This part aims to protect species by preserving their habitats, and considers biotopes to be objects worthy of conservation. It protects high-value biotopes that are often biodiversity hotspots and hosts endangered species. Article 18a NCHA defines the responsibilities and tasks of the Federal Council and the cantons. The Federal Council designates biotopes of national importance after consulting the cantons, determines their locations, and specifies the protection targets (art. 18a para 1 NCHA). Cantons regulate the protection and upkeep of biotopes of national importance. They are responsible for taking appropriate measures and implementing them (art. 18a para 2 NCHA). Art. 18a NCHA does not make substantive statements, but rather serves as a delegation provision and is the legal basis for ordinancies issued by the Federal government and cantons. Since 1987, it is the basis of inventory of biotopes of national importance.

=== History of the legal basis ===
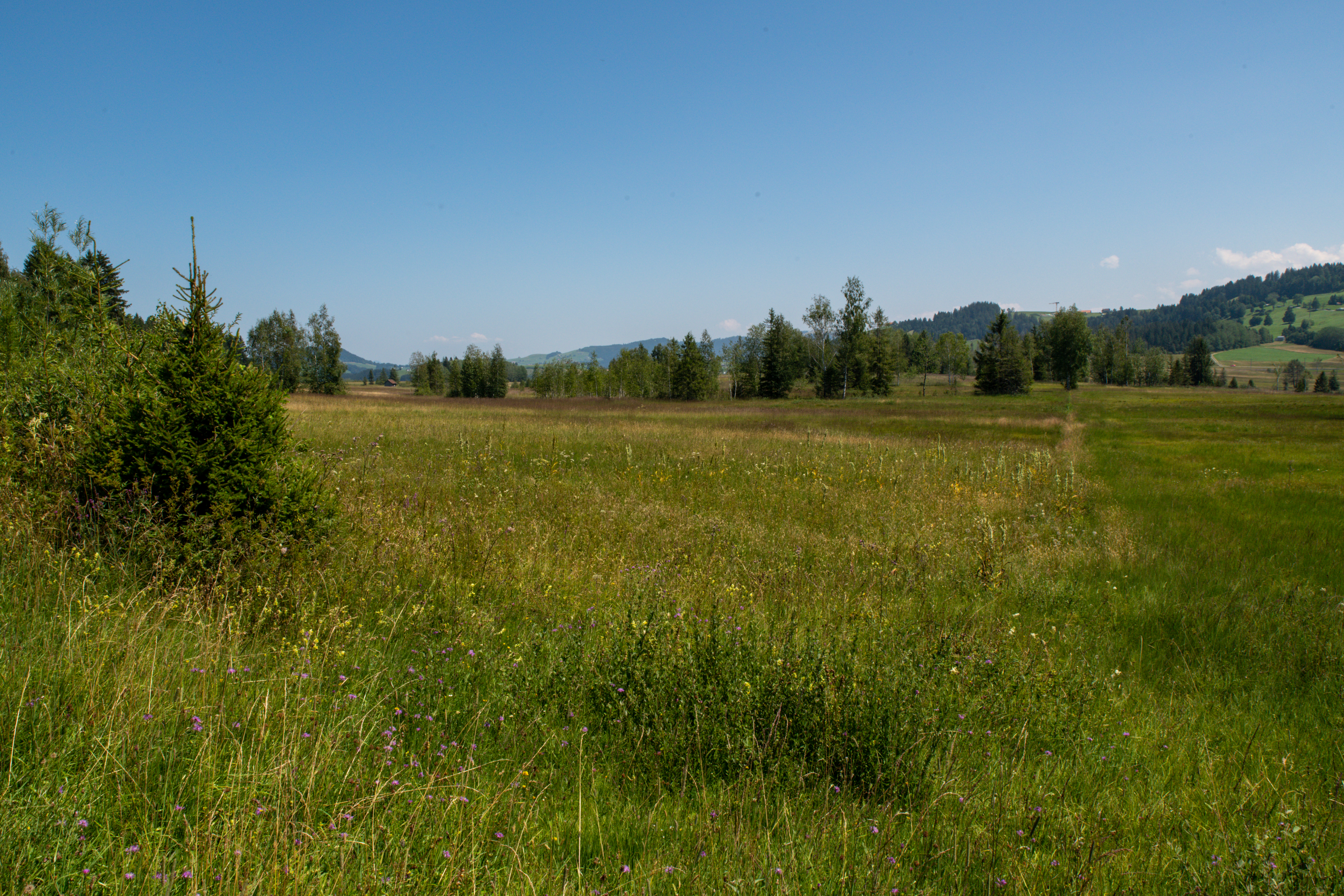
Moors of Rothenturm

Biotopes have been regulated since 1967 through Art. 18 NCHA. It was the first article recognizing the value of biotopes in addition to the need for protection of flora and fauna. Four new articles on biotopes were added in 1987: art. 18a NCHA on Biotopes of national importance; art. 18b NCHA on Biotopes of regional and local importance and ecological compensation, art. 18c NCHA on Position of land owners and operators regarding biotopes and art. 18d NCHA Financing the protection of biotopes. The inclusion of these various articles resulted from the amendment of the NCHA following the acceptance of "Rothenthurm Initiative",[1] which was submitted to and approved in a vote by the population and the Swiss cantons to protect the moors of Rothenthurm and other moors in Switzerland. A specific article on moors and wetlands has been added to the Federal Constitution of the Swiss Confederation under article 78 para 5.

=== Inventory of biotopes of national importance ===
The protection of biotopes of national importance is based on a list of biotopes of great worth. The reasons of an inscription on that inventory can be various, but are all linked to high ecological values. Here are several reasons for including a biotope in the inventory:

- High value for biodiversity (ex. hosting threaten species)
- Fallback area
- Role of connector
- Rare or threatened habitat
- Role in the environmental equilibrium

The inventory is organised using the classification of habitats of Switzerland, based on the “Guide des milieux naturels de Suisse”. This book defines nine major habitats in Switzerland with different threats, interests and therefore, different legal status have been established. Five of these categories are habitats of national importance and fall under the scope of Art. 18a NCHA. Each of these types of biotopes is regulated through a specific ordinance:

- Peat bog and transitional moors
- Low-level moor
- Floodplain areas
- Amphibian spawning areas
- Dry meadows and pastures

=== Responsibilities ===
The responsibility of the cantons and the confederation regarding the conservation of biotopes of national importance is legislated by Art. 18a NCHA. According to article 18a para 2 NCHA, cantons are responsible for organising the protection and maintenance of biotopes of national importance which are guided by the provisions of the habitat protection inventory ordinances. Those inventories specify the legal requirements for habitat protection and have the goal to efficiently protect endangered species. They must be often revised and updated with the help of federal offices, cantonal authorities, parties, commissions and NGOs. The Federal Council, after consultation with the cantons and other stakeholders, determines the objects of protection, sets the conservation goals and a timetable with the help and guidance of the Federal Office for the Environment (FOEN). Since the early 1990s, Switzerland has designated around 7’000 objects of national importance among the five categories. While fundamental determinations are set by the Federal government, the formal authority for issuing the necessary enforcement orders for biotopes of national importance lies with the cantons, which are responsible for nature protection within their territories.

==== Disagreements ====
According to article 18a para 1 NCHA, the Federal Council is obligated to consult with the cantons prior to designation. Nevertheless, the Federal Council can designate biotopes as objects of national importance against the will of the canton or attribute “no national importance" to an object, even if the canton desired otherwise.

=== Conservation objectives ===
The conservation objectives are determined by the Federal Council (Art. 18a Paragraph 1, NCHA). Deviations from the conservation objectives are only conceivable under the balancing of interests of the protection concept for riparian, amphibian spawning, and dry grassland biotopes. They could be, for example, if the project protects humans from harmful effects of natural hazards, but not, for example, for the construction of transport infrastructure. An intervention in the protected object, as previously stated, could only be conceivable if there are no alternatives to the proposed route and the project is of "national importance".

== See also ==
- List of raised and transitional bogs of Switzerland
- Federal Inventory of Amphibian Spawning Areas
- Federal Inventory of Landscapes and Natural Monuments
