= Tamera =

Peace research village in Portugal

Coordinates: 37°42′55″N 08°30′55″W

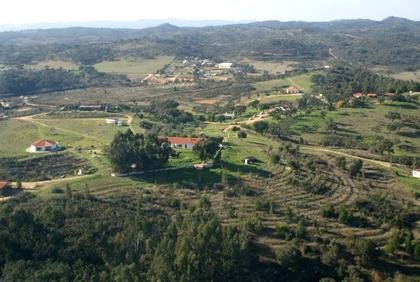
Aerial shot of the village

Tamera is a self proclaimed peace research village with the goal of becoming "a self-sufficient, sustainable and duplicable communitarian model for nonviolent cooperation and cohabitation between humans, animals, nature, and Creation for a future of peace for all." It is also often called a "healing biotope". Literally translated, "biotope" simply means a place where life lives. In Tamera, however, "healing biotope" is also described as a "greenhouse of trust, an acupuncture point of peace, and a self-sufficient future community." It is located on 335 acres (1.36 km^{2}) in the Alentejo region of southwestern Portugal.

== History ==

Tamera was founded in 1995 Dieter Duhm, Sabine Lichtenfels(de), and Rainer Ehrenpreis, of German origin. However, its history goes back to 1978 when these three left their professions and tried to create an interdisciplinary research center to find solutions to the ecological and technological problems the world was facing at that time. They acknowledged that for their project's survival they first had to research what they consider the core human relationship questions hidden under all issues, preventing "real solutions" – such as competition, greed, and jealousy. In 1983 they began a three-year "social experiment" with fifty participants in the Black Forest of (Germany), and then further developed the results of this research into creating a functioning community in other projects throughout Europe, until they finally established Tamera in 1995.

== Experimental research ==
Currently, approximately 250 coworkers and students (including children) live and study in Tamera which operates as an experimental research center dedicated to discovering how human beings can live peacefully among themselves and with nature, and create a successful, working, and sustainable community. Tamera is also a "free lab" and an international meeting place where peace workers and specialists in various fields from many parts of the world share their expertise.

== Theory ==
The research in Tamera is based on a complex world view explained in detail in The Sacred Matrix by Dieter Duhm. One essential part of this theory is the "implicate order" of David Bohm. Another is the "morphic field" theory developed by Rupert Sheldrake, where only a few peace research villages worldwide of a large enough size and complexity in which peace is established in all its aspects are enough to create cultural healing on a global level.

“What will determine the success of such peace projects is not how big and strong they are (compared to the existing apparatus of violence), but how comprehensive and complex they are, and how many elements of life they combine and unite in a positive way. When establishing new fields in evolution, it is not the law of the strongest, but the success of the more comprehensive that is the determining factor. Otherwise, no new developments could be made, for when they begin they are all small and inconspicuous."

The political goal of Tamera and its cooperation partners worldwide is to create several such centers on earth, which they call “the plan of the healing biotopes.”

== Projects ==
Tamera serves as the headquarters for a number of different and independent projects that, when brought together properly, they believe can establish a new social model and a new culture of peace. They include the Global Campus, Monte Cerro Peace Education, the GRACE Foundation, the Institute for Global Peacework, Verlag Meiga Publishing Company, the Children's Center, the Love School, the SolarVillage, the Permaculture Project, the Horse Project, the Seminar and Guest Center and the Terra Nova movement.

=== The Global Campus ===
The Global Campus is a worldwide educational initiative designed to offer knowledge in community development as well as the basic principles of decentralized energy supply, architecture, and ecology required to establish autonomous peace villages. Tamera is the home of the first phase of the Global Campus – the Monte Cerro Peace Education – and is cooperating with the San José de Apartadó Peace Village in Colombia and the Holy Land Trust in Palestine to establish similar educational centers around the world.

=== Monte Cerro Peace education ===
“Monte Cerro Peace Education" is a three-year course of studies for a comprehensive understanding for the development of globally effective peace villages. More than one hundred students have enrolled since "Monte Cerro" opened on 1 May 2006, and in April 2009 the first class will graduate.

=== GRACE Foundation ===
The GRACE Foundation was established in 2007, founded by Sabine Lichtenfels, to direct and attract money towards peace projects in an attempt to offset the large amounts of money now being directed into war and war industries. With the motto, "A peace village instead of a tank," the Foundation mainly finances peace actions and peace education which are connected to the power of grace.

“GRACE follows the realization that we can only create as much peace outside ourselves as we have created inside ourselves. GRACE reminds us that the healing of our planet can only succeed if humanity succeeds in connecting itself with the true basis of life and love, trust and truth; and humanity will only succeed if we personally succeed. GRACE embraces the commitment not to aggravate personal and political conflicts, but to create new possibilities for solutions."

=== The Institute for Global Peacework (IGP) ===
The Institute for Global Peacework is a network of peaceworkers and peace initiatives around the world who want to cooperate to create a nonviolent future. It coordinates all the different projects in Tamera and serves as the “base camp” for all external activities. It also hosts an annual “Summer University” that brings these different people and projects together in a “think tank.”

=== Verlag Meiga Publishing Company ===
Verlag Meiga publishes books, literature, and essential thoughts to disseminate the knowledge and experience of over thirty years of research into the development of the “plan of the healing biotopes.” Its main headquarters is in (Germany), with a branch in Tamera.

=== The Children’s Center ===
The basic principle of the work with children in Tamera is the “education of perception.” In addition to languages, math, biology, and geography, the main emphasis in learning is placed on studies in community development, art, cosmology, international networking, and how to be a spiritual being in the world.

=== The Love School ===
One core tenet of the Tamera theory is that a nonviolent culture will essentially depend on whether we succeed in ending the war between the genders. Love without jealousy, sexuality without fear, faithfulness that is not broken when one loves and desires others, truth and longevity in love, and new pathways in partnerships are the focus of the “Love School.”

“There cannot be peace between nations as long as there is war between man and woman.”

=== The SolarVillage ===
The “SolarVillage” is a test site in Tamera for a model village intended to be self-sufficient in energy and food production for fifty people. It is designed to be built without using large energy companies. Ecology, technology, architecture, and community are combined in a pilot project designed and monitored by physicist and inventor Jürgen Kleinwächter. With the energy produced by a system of lenses within a greenhouse and stored in a hot oil system, cooking is available. Power and electricity can also be produced by means of sun-powered pulses of the low-temperature Stirling engine. Vegetables and other plants grow under light filtered by these lenses.

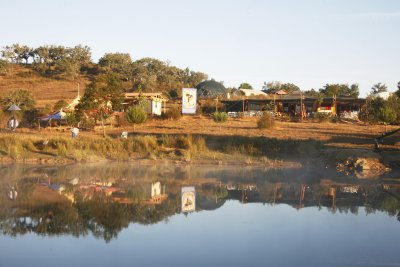
The lake in front of the Monte Cerro campus

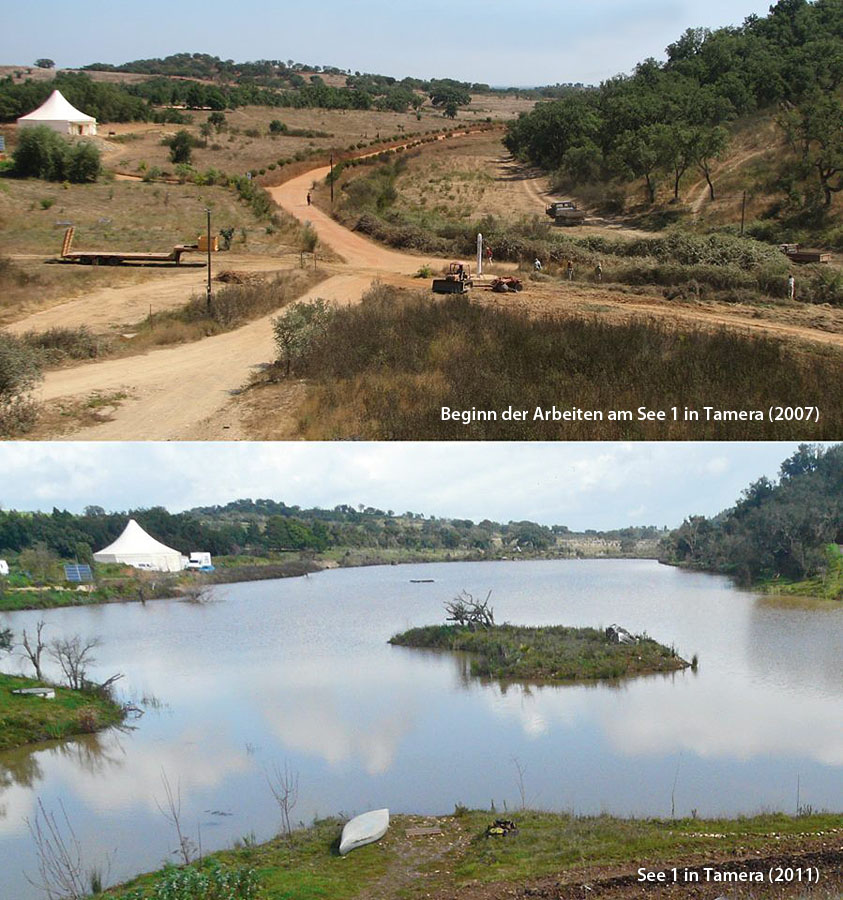
Lake 1 of the Rainwater harvesting landscape in Tamera, Portugal

=== The Permaculture Project ===
Since Tamera was founded, an ecological team has made ponds and oases, and planted about 20,000 trees. Sepp Holzer, Austrian mountain farmer known throughout Europe as the "Agro-Rebel," is cooperating with Tamera to build a sustainable "lakescape" in the dry Alentejo region of Portugal, surrounded by a self-sufficient edible landscape with trees, gardens, and wetlands.

=== The Horse Project ===
The basis of working with horses in Tamera is to develop a new way of cooperation between human and horse, to promote inner growth, and to increase the ability to be in intimate contact with animals. The horses are ridden without bits or saddles, which requires trust and sensitive communication. The Horse Project is now expanding to offer first-aid treatment for sick, injured, or abused animals, and developing an Animal Sanctuary.

=== Seminar and Guest Center ===
The Seminar and Guest Center offers visitors the possibility to get to know Tamera, its grounds, and its research activities. The Center includes the Tamera Guesthouse, visitor cabins and community tents, as well as the International Youth Cultural Center; and its activities include courses and seminars, Information Weeks, the Summer University, and Open Sundays.

=== Terra Nova movement ===
Terra Nova is the global platform that has arisen from the ideas of Dieter Duhm and Sabine Lichtenfels and from the real experience of Tamera. Terra Nova aims to create the conditions for a global system change for a nonviolent Earth, through activism, education and networking and by spreading perspectives for profoundly nonviolent culture based on trust and cooperation.

In 2015, Dieter Duhm wrote the book Terra Nova: Global Revolution and the Healing of Love to expound upon and clarify the basic ideas of the movement.

== Art and Music ==
In many intensive courses and community encounters throughout the history of the Tamera project, art was discovered to be a creative principle of Creation and became an essential element for the inner development of community. In addition to painting, "art" in Tamera now includes music, theater, dance, landscape art, and artistic expression in language. For example, there is a Tamera Chorus as well as a small a cappella jazz group called the "MoonRiders."

The straw bale and clay Great Hall

== Architecture ==
Tamera has created experimental buildings as models for the construction of peace villages, designed by various architects such as Gernot Minke, professor of Clay Architecture at the University of Kassel, Germany. Designer Martin Pietsch of Tamera has developed "Shade Creations" which have been used not only in Tamera but in quite a number of light-roof pavilions in other locations.

The Great Hall in Tamera is a meeting place for up to 300 people. It is a wood-frame, straw bale, clay, and green roof construction. With its harmonic interior structure, it is the largest straw bale and clay building on the Iberian Peninsula.

== Spirituality ==
In Tamera, spirituality and religion are not questions of some profession of faith or creed, but of a clear perception, openness, and connection with universal forces in daily life. The core community gathers together every morning and every afternoon in the "Political Ashram" to focus on attunement and connection through spiritual lectures. There is also a stone circle in Tamera made up of more than sixty monoliths, created and arranged by Sabine Lichtenfels in cooperation with Marko Pogacnik and Peter Frank, that serves as a place of meditation and power.

== See also ==
- Biotope
- Boom Festival
- Findhorn Foundation
- ZEGG (community)
