= Frances Talbot =

Frances Talbot may refer to:

- Frances Talbot, Countess of Tyrconnell (c. 1649–1731), a maid of honour to the Duchess of York
- Frances Talbot, Countess of Morley (1782–1857), English author and artist

== See also ==
- Francis Talbot (disambiguation)
