= ZEGG (community) =

Eco-community in Germany

Coordinates: 52°09′26″N 12°35′27″E

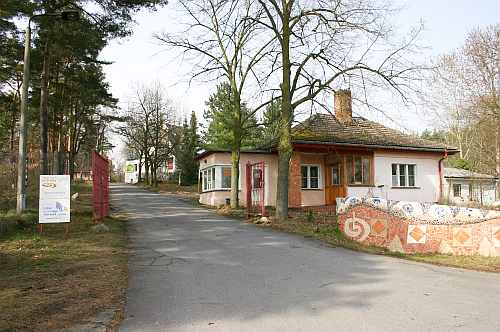
ZEGG-Belzig

ZEGG (Zentrum für experimentelle Gesellschaftsgestaltung or Center for Experimental Cultural Design) is an ecovillage located on the outskirts of Bad Belzig, Germany, about 80 km (50 mi) south-west of Berlin.

It is an intentional community and an international seminar centre aiming to develop and implement practical models for a socially and ecologically sustainable way of living. To do this, it integrates personal growth work, the establishment of a cooperative and environment-friendly way of living and participation in political issues. In particular, ZEGG focuses on exploring innovative approaches to love and sexuality and it has developed and practices the use of tools for personal expression and trust building in large groups, including the ZEGG Forum.

ZEGG was founded in 1991 on a 37-acre site (15 hectares), where approx. 100 people now live, including 15 children and youth (as of 2011). The facilities on site include: an ecological sewage plant, a CO_{2}-neutral heating system, organic vegetable garden, some clay buildings, a meditation room, artists' studios, workshops, a guesthouse, the "Children’s Building" and a range of other rooms and facilities for events and seminars. Since 2015 ZEGG is recognized as a non-profit organization.

== Workshops and festivals ==
ZEGG Community offers several large festivals and many workshops throughout the year. They cover topics such as community knowledge, communication, love and sexuality, non-violent communication, arts and singing. The official host for all these events is the non-profit limited company ZEGG gGmbH.

== Community life ==
ZEGG's social aim is the long-term promotion of a community-based way of life and it has created its own social structure to achieve this. Community members participate in social processes designed to promote communication, resolve conflicts and support personal development processes. There are also regular discos, seasonal celebrations, internal lectures and discussion rounds and other cultural events.

Many of the community members work within the seminar business, which encompasses catering, accommodation, organisation of events and running seminars. Other areas where members work directly for the community include the garden and the site maintenance team. Community-members also are self-employed, some have day jobs in the region or earn their living further afield. Members are also expected to carry out some voluntary work within the community.

Most community members live in shared accommodation of various sizes; some live alone or as couples. Most children live together with their parents and go to nurseries or schools in the region. In the afternoons, a parents' initiative organises childcare in the Children's Building. The whole community shares the costs of maintaining this building and providing accommodation, food and care for the children.

== Decisions and organisation ==
ZEGG has adopted a sociocratic model for its internal organisation. It is built on self-organizing teams that represent the whole organisation, with more comprehensive ones at the top and more specialised ones under them. The teams represent a clear area of activity within ZEGG, such as the garden or catering. The Management team takes financial decisions and implements the organisation's goals whilst keeping the higher-level interests of the community in mind. These are the responsibility of the Visionsrat or Board. All decisions can be revised if they turn out to be unworkable in practice. Important social and financial decisions are made by the community as a whole using consensus decision-making.

== Focusing on love, partnership and sexuality ==
One of the ZEGG community's founding aims was to research the issues of love and sexuality. In the early years the prevailing idea was that of free love. Inspired by Dieter Duhm's ideas, the community set off on a search for a way to be together that would help to overcome the fears and possessiveness we often experience that hinder our ability to love. After the initial radical approach, more and more emphasis then began to be placed on partnerships. Today, some ZEGG members live in various forms of open relationships and others live as monogamous couples. The aim of ZEGG is still to take an open approach to love and sexuality, building trust among each other whatever form relationships may take.

== Controversies ==
There was public controversy about ZEGG, particularly in the early days. In his 1970 book Angst im Kapitalismus [Fear in Capitalism], Dieter Duhm argued, among other things, that women harboured lifelong rape fantasies as a result of the unconscious desire to be raped by their own father and that they could experience their first orgasm as a result of a real rape. Women enjoyed the violent satisfaction of their urges; those among them who were committed against rape were actually fighting their own desire for masochistic satisfaction. This trivialising attitude towards rape was heavily criticised, particularly by feminists.

With reference to Duhm's statements, ZEGG was criticised for its sexual orientation and an image of women that was considered sexist. The community was also accused of having an authoritarian structure, characteristics of a psycho-sect, sexism and paedophile tendencies.

Particularly harsh attacks came from Jutta Ditfurth. In 1996, she described ZEGG as an "authoritarian sex cult", criticised its proximity to Otto Muehl, Rudolf Bahro and the Findhorn Foundation and accused the centre of being close to Nazism and of trivialising child abuse, as it had been conveyed at seminars at ZEGG that a "collaboration between organised feminism, the press and the church" and "the hatred of radical feminists gone mad," was behind the trials for sexual violence. ZEGG rejected these accusations in a detailed statement in 2013, but the statement can no longer be found on their website.

== ZEGG-Forum ==
"ZEGG-Forum" is a ritualized form of transparent communication between individuals and groups. It was invented by the original community of the "Bauhütte" in 1978 and proved essential for the continuation of ZEGG. It is a social process for groups of 12 to 50 participants and has been adopted by groups in the US and abroad including the Network for a New Culture. It is used to create transparency in relationships, to reduce social tensions and to create bonding. Its playful and ritualized form makes it easier to share thoughts and feelings that usually are hidden, thus strengthening social contacts. The idea is that social systems and individuals profit from supportive feedback.

== Ecology and energy ==
ZEGG is an eco-village and is a member of the Global Ecovillage Network (GEN).

The community aims to take as much of its energy supply as possible from CO_{2}-neutral, renewable and regional energy sources. ZEGG generates all of its heating needs on-site. The lignite-fired power plant on the site was modernised in 2010. It runs on woodchips that are sourced from forests in the surrounding region. Around 85% of the electricity supply comes from photovoltaic plants and gas-powered combined heat and power plants (cogeneration plants). Additional electricity is purchased from Green Planet Energy that ensures the supply comes from renewable sources.

A constructed wetland sewage treatment system was built in 1992, which purifies all the wastewater from the site in a specially planted marshy area, which also provides a new habitat for animals. The drinking water comes directly from groundwater through three wells.

Permaculture is a guiding principle for ZEGG when it comes to developing and using its site. Mulch and green fertilisers ensure the sandy soil benefits from long-term improvements in fertility. As the soil became healthier, higher-order creatures followed, such as birds, hedgehogs, martens, toads and squirrels. The site has an edible landscape with indigenous fruit and leaves, as well as apricots, peaches, grapes, kiwi fruit, mulberries and figs growing in sheltered areas. Since 2013 ZEGG is experimenting with the use of Biochar and Terra Preta in building soil and fertility. For this purpose Urine is collected in waterless Urinals.

The ZEGG garden (1 ha) follows organic gardening guidelines. Vegetables, salads and flowers are all thriving there, including pumpkins, carrots, leeks and kale. There are various sorts of fruit as well.

Food provided for residents and guests at ZEGG is vegetarian and partly vegan. In the summer, the food comes from daily harvests in the garden, prepared in the large kitchens and served fresh to the guests. Additional food required is purchased from organic wholesalers, regional producers and/or fair trade sources.

In 2004 ZEGG was awarded the second prize in the Agenda 21 competition in the local government district where it is located, Potsdam-Mittelmark, because of its woodchip-fired heating system and constructed wetland sewage treatment. In 2011, the community once again won the second prize in the district's Agenda 21 competition, this time for its new, innovative energy concept.

== Site history ==
The site on which ZEGG Community lives today had historical links to both German dictatorships. Its first settlement can be traced back to 1919, when it was used agriculturally with a market garden and small farm animals. Ownership of the site was then transferred to the SS at the beginning of the 1930s and before the Olympics in 1936, German military cavalry riders used it for their equestrian training. After that, it became a training camp for the Hitler Youth and League of German Maidens (National Socialist youth movements) and the Sportlerheim Belzig (Athletes' Home) was built as a destination for holidays organised by the Kraft durch Freude movement. Having been used by the East German trade union federation in the 1950s as a training school for officials, at the beginning of the 1960s the site was taken over by the foreign intelligence service of the GDR (HVA) and became a training centre for reconnaissance abroad. The school was under the direct command of the Head of Foreign Intelligence, Markus Wolf. After top agent Werner Stiller fled to the West and revealed the existence of the espionage school in 1988, it was decided to move the school and turn the site into a sanatorium. The renovation work was still being carried out when the Berlin Wall came down and the GDR ceased to exist. ZEGG Community purchased the site in 1991 for 2.1 million German marks. There is an exhibition about the history of the site in one of the seminar buildings.

== History of the ideas ==
ZEGG as a project arose out of the ideas developed by Dieter Duhm and Sabine Lichtenfels. His book "Fear in Capitalism" had made Dieter Duhm one of the leading thinkers in the "1968" movement. In 1978, Dieter Duhm founded the "Bauhütte" community project in southern Germany. They wanted to create a pioneering non-violent cultural model. One of the keys to this was considered by the community to be the "healing of love between man and woman". So they experimented with, among other things, intensive group processes and liberated sexuality. The community saw its way of living as a political statement and actively sought publicity for this, which led to some controversial reporting in the press. There were also accusations, made primarily by the church, that the community was a sect and, coming primarily from left-wing groups, that the project was sexist. The debate continued as a group from the Bauhütte founded ZEGG in 1991. Dieter Duhm and Sabine Lichtenfels moved to Portugal and in 1994 set up their own project, called Tamera. ZEGG developed from a community with strong leadership figures and a relatively uniform worldview into a democratic and pluralist project. Today the relevant government and church authorities no longer accuse ZEGG of being a sect.

== See also ==
- Ecovillage
- Intentional community
- Sociocracy
- Tamera
- Vegetarianism

== Literature ==
- "Beyond you and me – Inspirations and Wisdom for Building Community S.128 (Forum – A way of group communication; Richter)" Free download: Beyond you and me e-book at Gaia Education website
- Bang, Martin: Ecovillages. A practical guide to sustainable living. Edinburgh 2005.
