= Biotope =

Habitat for communities made up of populations of multiple species

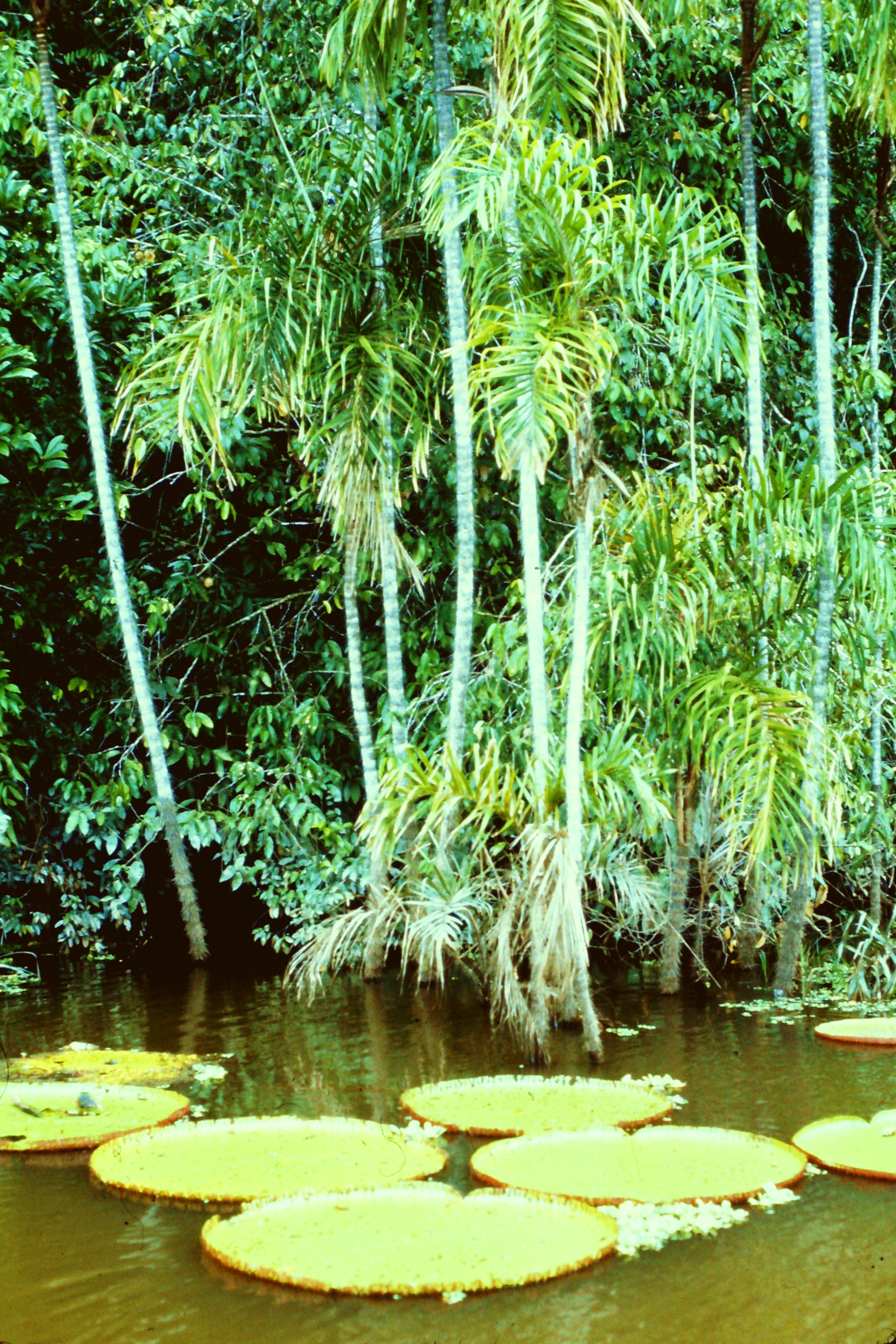
Amazon rainforest biotope

A biotope is an area of uniform environmental conditions providing a living place for a specific assemblage of plants and animals. Biotope is almost synonymous with the term habitat, which is more commonly used in English-speaking countries. However, in some countries these two terms are distinguished: the subject of a habitat is a population, the subject of a biotope is a biocoenosis, or "biological community".

It is an English loanword derived from the German Biotop, which in turn came from the Greek bios, meaning 'life', and topos, meaning 'place'. (The related word geotope has made its way into the English language by the same route, from the German Geotop.)

== Ecology ==
The concept of a biotope was first advocated by Ernst Haeckel (1834–1919), a German zoologist famous for the recapitulation theory. In his book General Morphology (1866), which defines the term "ecology", he stresses the importance of the concept of habitat as a prerequisite for an organism's existence. Haeckel also explains that with one ecosystem, its biota is shaped by environmental factors (such as water, soil, and geographical features) and interaction among living things; the original idea of a biotope was closely related to evolutional theory. Following this, F. Dahl, a professor at the Berlin Zoological Museum, referred to this ecological system as a "biotope" (biotop) (1908).

== Biotope restoration ==
Although the term "biotope" is considered to be a technical word with respect to ecology, in recent years the term is more generally used in administrative and civic activities. Since the 1970s the term "biotope" has received great attention as a keyword throughout Europe (mainly Germany) for the preservation, regeneration, and creation of natural environmental settings. Used in this context, the term "biotope" often refers to a smaller and more specific ecology and is very familiar to human life. In Germany especially, activities related to regenerating biotopes are enthusiastically received. These activities include:

- making roof gardens
- reconstructing rivers to restore their natural qualities
- leaving bushes or trees on farms
- building nature parks along motorways
- making school gardens or ponds by considering the ecosystem
- bearing in mind ecological considerations in private gardens

Various sectors play a part in these activities, including architecture, civil engineering, urban planning, traffic, agriculture, river engineering, limnology, biology, education, landscape gardening, and domestic gardening. In all fields, all sorts of people are seeking a viable way for humans to respect other living things. The term "biotope" would include a complete environmental approach.

== Characteristics ==
The following four points are the chief characteristics of biotopes.

=== Microscale ===
A biotope is generally not considered to be a large-scale phenomenon. For example, a biotope might be a neighbouring park, a back garden, potted plant, a terrarium or a fish tank on a porch. In other words, the biotope is not a macroscopic but a microscopic approach to preserving the ecosystem and biological diversity. So biotopes fit into ordinary people's daily activities and lives, with more people being able to take part in biotope creation and continuing management.

=== Biotope networks ===
It is commonly emphasised that biotopes should not be isolated (although there are exceptions, such as manmade closed ecological systems which are specifically designed for no exchange of materials with the outside world). Instead biotopes need to be connected to each other and other surrounding life for without these connections to life-forms such as animals and plants, biotopes would not effectively work as a place in which diverse organisms live. So one of the most effective strategies for regenerating biotopes is to plan a stretch of biotopes, not just a point where animals and plants come and go. (Such an organic traffic course is called a corridor.) In the stretch method, the centre of the network would be large green tracts of land: a forest, natural park, or cemetery. By connecting parcels of land with smaller biotope areas such as a green belt along the river, small town parks, gardens, or even roadside trees, biotopes can exist in a network. In other words, a biotope is an open, not a closed, system and is a practicable strategy.

=== Human daily life ===
The term "biotope" does not apply to biosphere reserves, which are completely separate from humans and become the object of human admiration. Instead, it is an active part of human daily life. For example, an ornamental flower bed may be considered a biotope (though a rather small one) since it enhances the experience of daily life. An area that has many functions, such as human living space, and is home to other living things, whether plant or animal, can be considered a biosphere reserve.

=== Artificial ===
When artificial items are introduced to a biotope setting, their design and arrangement is of great importance for biotope regeneration. Tree-planting areas where the surface is uneven results in plants that sprout and the nesting of small insects. A mat or net made from natural fibres will gradually biodegrade as it is exposed to the weather. So there is no binomial opposition between the natural and the artificial in a biotope. Rather, such artificial materials are widely used.

== Germany ==
It is especially characteristic in Germany, which is the birthplace of the term biotope, that the authorities take the initiative in conserving biotopes, maintaining consistency with urban or rural planning and considering the regions' history and landscape.

=== Legal basis ===
Since 1976, the federal nature protection law, Bundesnaturschutzgesetz (BNUM), requires that wild animals and plants and their community should be protected as part of the ecosystem in the specific diversity that has grown naturally and historically, and their biotope and other living conditions should be protected, preserved, developed, and restored. (Number 9, Clause 1, Article 2). The law also requires that some kinds of biotope that are full of a specific variety should not be harmed by development. So there is a law that mandates the protection of biotopes. There is also a provincial law corresponding to the federal one. Such developments were uncommon in those times.

=== Landscape plan ===
Many German states are obliged by law to produce a landscape plan (Landschaftsplan) as part of their urban planning, though these plans vary somewhat from place to place. The purpose of the Landschaftsplan is to protect the region's environment and landscape. These plans use text and figures to describe the present environmental state and proposed remedies. They consider, for example, the regional lie of the land, climate, wind direction, soil, ground water, type of biotope, distribution of animals and plants, inhabitants' welfare and competition with development projects.

=== Citizen welfare ===
Biotope preservation in cities also emphasises recreation and relaxation for citizens and improving the urban environment. For example, in the reserve of Karlsruhe in Baden-Württemberg people can cycle on the bike path or walk the dog, although it is forbidden to gather plants and animals there or walk in the exclusion zone. At the core of biotope preservation is the idea that if civic life is surrounded by a rich profusion of nature whose background is in local history and culture, it is improved by protecting nature and preserving the landscape.

== Aquaria ==
The term "biotope" is also often used by aquarium hobbyists to describe an aquarium setup that tries to simulate the natural habitat of a specific assemblage of fish. The idea is to replicate conditions such as water parameters, natural plants, substrate, water type (fresh, saline or brackish), lighting, and to include other native fish which usually live together in nature and as such, represent a particular real-world biotope. An example of one South American biotope type might be "Forest creek tributary of Rio Negro near Barcelos, Brazil" with many branches, twigs, roots, dead leaves, light sandy substrate, tannin-stained water and subdued lighting with floating plants, along with Nannostomus eques, Paracheirodon axelrodi, Hemigrammus bleheri, and Dicrossus filamentosus. "South American" is not itself a biotope, as South America contains thousands of distinct biotopes in different regions.

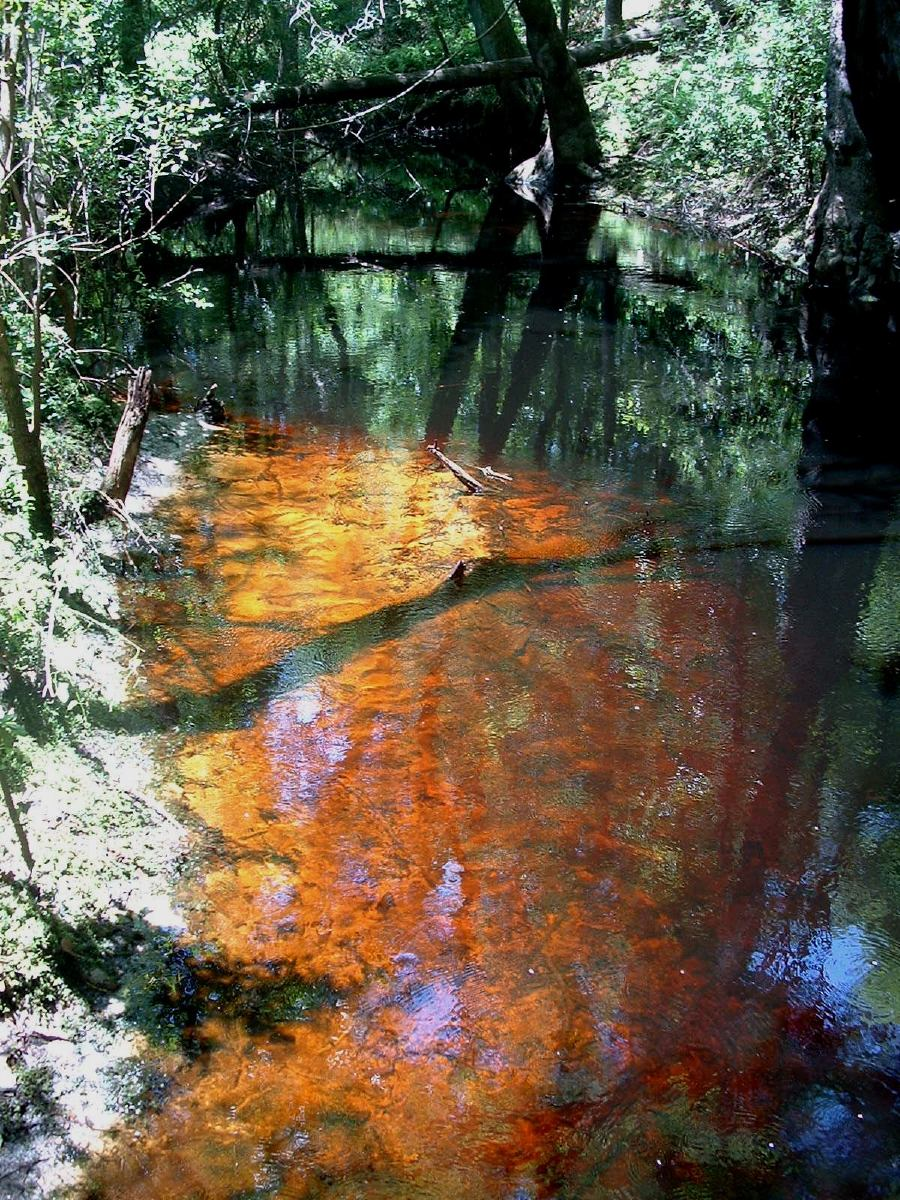
A blackwater stream

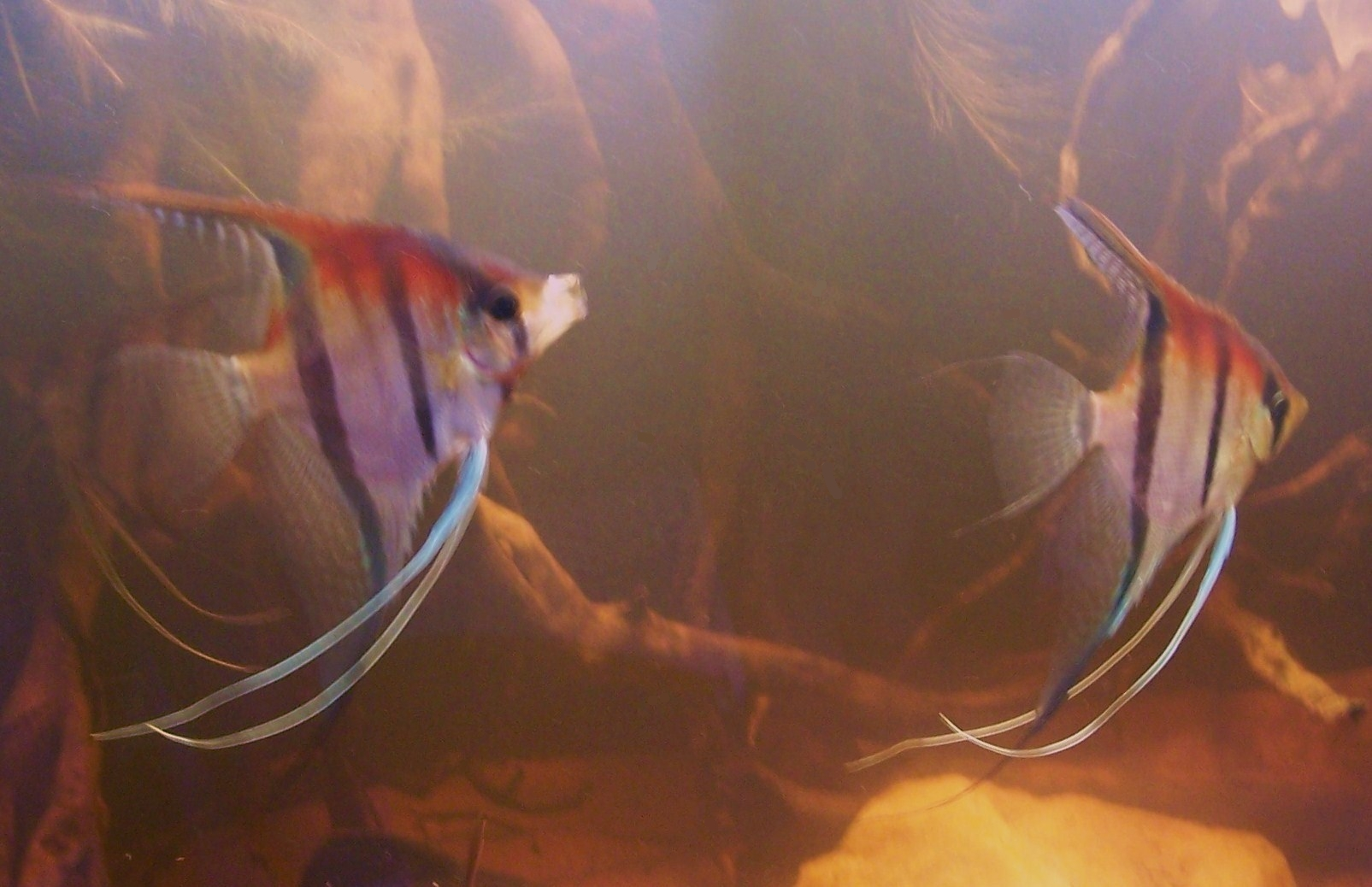
A blackwater aquarium

== Artificial closed ecological systems ==
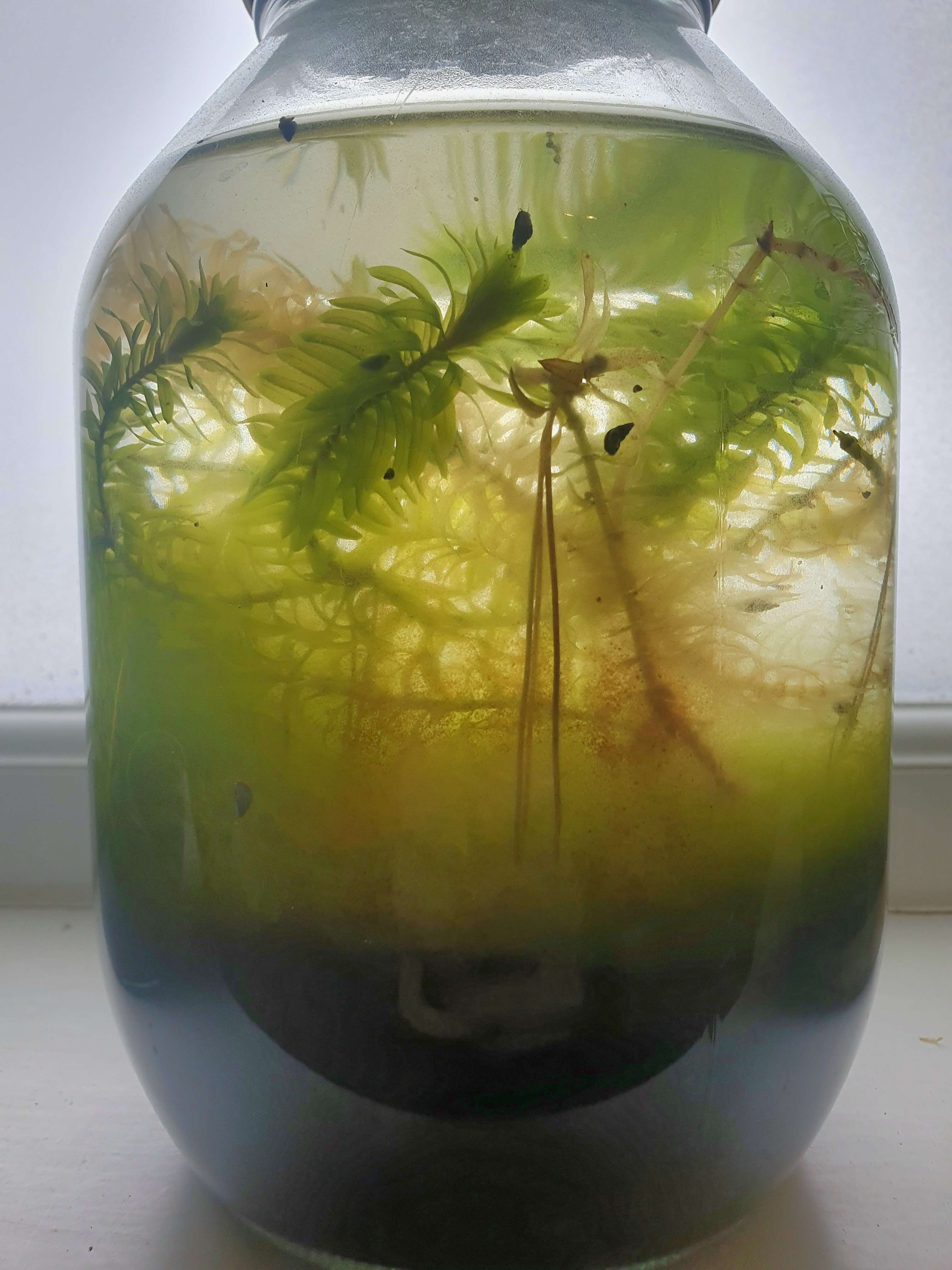
An aquatic closed biotope containing egeria densa and thick algal mats, a number of unidentified aquatic snails can be seen living on the glass.

The term "biotope" can be also used to describe manmade closed ecological systems, occasionally also referred to as CES systems. Examples of these include the Biosphere 2 project and to a lesser degree the Eden Project, which contain areas of uniform environmental conditions and house numerous species of plants, animals and fungi. Therefore these can be considered biotopes. Homemade ecological systems, often incorrectly referred to as ecospheres (due to the product, known as the EcoSphere) or jarrariums also fall under the definition of biotope. These homemade ecosystems (which also include closed terrariums) are often made by hobbyists in what are often jars (hence the name jarrarium) or sealed glass tanks with the intention of mimicking a larger ecosystem. They are often made by going out and collecting material (including soil, plants, small insects and water if an aquatic ecosystem) from said ecosystem and sealing it in an airtight container. These closed ecosystems are often made by hobbyists who enjoy the idea of having an entire ecosystem on their windowsill, or by those interested in studying the viability of small scale, closed loop ecological systems for the purpose potentially creating life support systems.

== See also ==
- Dieter Duhm
- Ecological land classification
- Ecotope
- Geotope
- Microclimate
- Biotopes of national importance in Switzerland
