= Karlsruhe freight bypass railway =

Railway line in Germany

Overview
- Native name: Güterumgehungsbahn Karlsruhe
- Line number: 4210 (Karlsruhe–Karlsruhe-Hagsfeld); 4211 (Karlsruhe–Karlsruhe-Durlach); 4213 (Karlsruhe–Karlsruhe-Brunnenstück); 4214 (Karlsruhe–Karlsruhe-Dammerstock); 4215 (Karlsruhe–Karlsruhe West); 4217 (Karlsruhe–Karlsruhe-Durlach)
- Locale: Baden-Württemberg, Germany

Service
- Route number: (only freight)

Technical
- Track gauge: 1,435 mm (4 ft 8 1/2 in) standard gauge
- Electrification: 15 kV/16.7 Hz AC overhead catenary

The Karlsruhe freight bypass railway German: Güterumgehungsbahn Karlsruhe is railway line reserved for freight only in the southeast of the city of Karlsruhe in the German state of Baden-Württemberg. The freight rail bypass allows freight trains to avoid the busy Karlsruhe Central Station (Hauptbahnhof) on a separate direct line.

The freight rail bypass is classified as a main line and has two tracks throughout and is electrified. It has the highest German track class of D4, which means that the line is built for axle loads of 22.5 tonnes and loads of 8.0 tonnes per metre of train.

The PZB 90 intermittent cab signalling system is used on the freight rail bypass. This contrasts with the parallel access line to the central station, which is protected by the LZB train protection system.

== History ==
The line was opened in 1895 with the marshalling yard it served in the southeast of the city. In the northeast it was connected via a branch line from the Rhine Valley Railway running between the old Karlsruhe Hauptbahnhof and the old Durlach station. Another connection was opened in 1895, passing under the Hauptbahnhof–Durlach line to the Rhine Railway to Graben. In the southwest, there were also connections to the existing line from the old Hauptbahnhof to Ettlingen-West, and—after crossing under them—the lines to Wörth and to Durmersheim (also opened in 1895).

In 1913, the new Karlsruhe Hauptbahnhof was built near the marshalling yard. The freight lines were engineered so that they largely avoided crossing the passenger lines to the Hauptbahnhof. The old Karlsruhe freight yard had been connected directly to the old Rhine Valley Railway on the line to the old Hauptbahnhof near the city centre, so the dead-end yard was now only accessible via the bypass from the direction of Hagsfeld, or via a track construction plant from the old Durlach–Karlsruhe line from the north side or via another track from this line from the south side. The same was true of access to the old Durlach freight yard. Even the former Karlsruhe locomotive workshop near the former Karlsruhe freight yard was now only accessible via the bypass.

Passenger services were introduced in 1913 on the bypass because the lines from the new central station ran to the Palatinate via Karlsruhe West and the new Mühlburg station via this line.

== Current situation ==
A container terminal was formerly located between the marshalling yard and the passenger line between Karlsruhe Hauptbahnhof and Durlach and on the other side of Wolfartsweierer Straße there was a loading facility with two tracks. A large scale freight yard originally planned there as a replacement for the abandoned Karlsruhe Durlach freight yard has not been realised. The area of the former Karlsruhe locomotive workshop and the closed parts of the freight yard have been used to extend the Südstadt district and for a new neighbourhood park, the Ostauepark.

The marshalling yard’s hump yard is closed. Its former tracks are now used for the parking of old wagons. Other tracks are used for parking freight trains and locomotives.

Line VzG 4210 connects the freight bypass to the line to Graben in both directions at Hagsfeld via a flying junction. In contrast, the links to the freight bypass from the lines from Bruchsal (VzG 4217) and Pforzheim (VzG 4211) only directly connect with the tracks running from Pforzheim and Bruchsal, requiring trains running in the opposite direction to cross tracks at-grade. The track that formerly connected the yard towards Pforzheim without requiring an at-grade crossing has been closed. Line VzG 4214 connects the bypass to the line to Durmersheim and line VzG 4213 connects to the line to Ettlingen; both are grade-separated in both directions. Line VzG 4215, which connects towards Wörth, is a single track line and initially passes under the Palatine Maximilian Railway and later connects with it at Karlsruhe West at an at-grade junction.
