= Dieter Duhm =

German academic

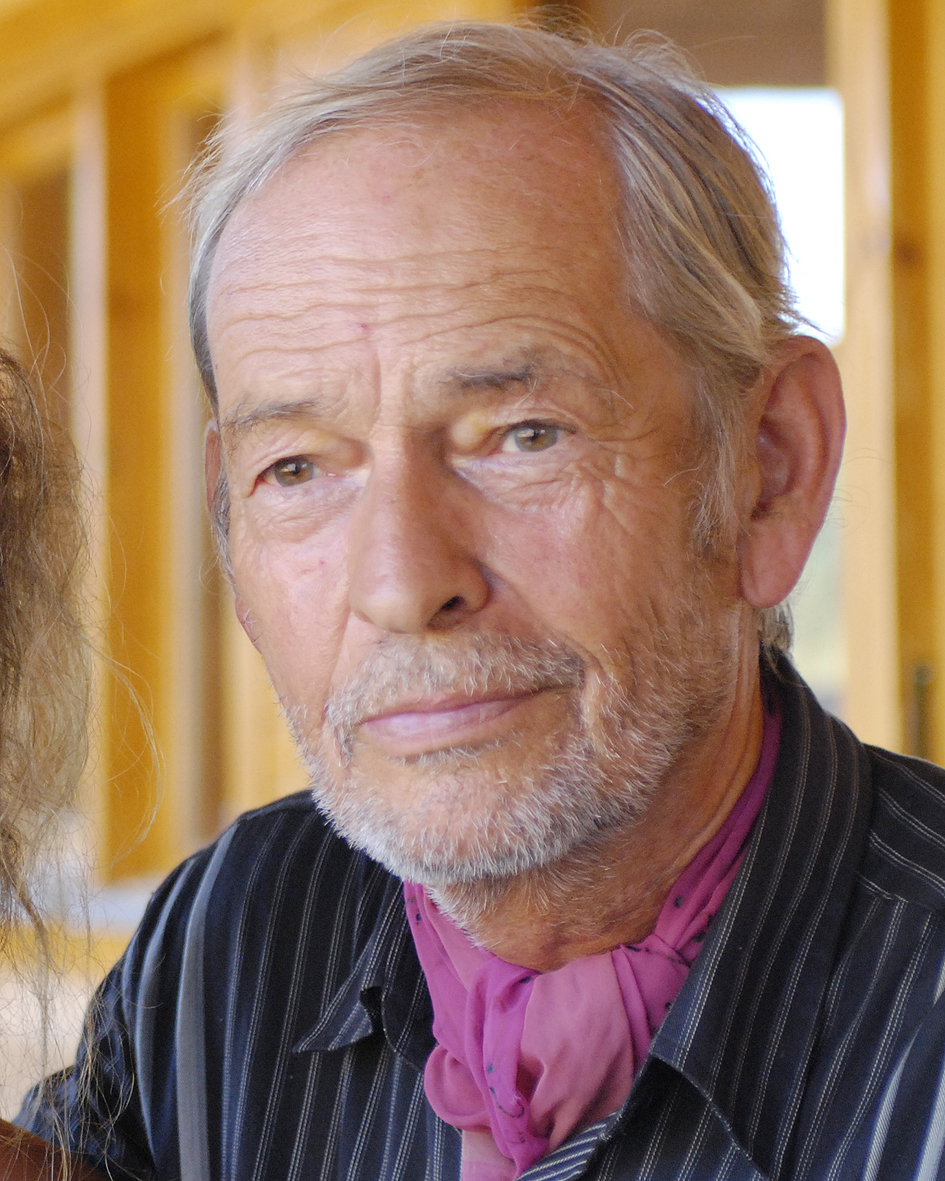
Dr. Dieter Duhm

Dieter Duhm (born 19 September 1942, in Berlin), sociologist, psychoanalyst, art historian and author, is one of the co-founders of Tamera, a peace research center in southwestern Portugal.

== Influences ==
During this period, Duhm says that he found inspiration in the works of Nietzsche, Hegel, van Gogh, Rudolf Steiner, Jesus, Laozi, Prentice Mulford, and Teilhard de Chardin; and he spent time in the Aktionsanalytische Organisation (AAO) with Otto Muehl at the Friedrichshof community in Austria, and with Bhagwan Shree Rajneesh in India.

Focusing on the question how war and violence can be overcome on a global scale, Duhm became intensively interested in the theories of the Marxist psychoanalyst Wilhelm Reich. His contention with and eventual renunciation of Reich led him into a deeper study of Asiatic traditions, such as different meditation practises, yoga, tai chi, and others.

== Early theory ==
As indicated by the titles of his published work, Duhm was never a purely Marxist economist, but had always been interested in the individual, psychological issues underlying the world’s problems. For example, Duhm has said that “before we can solve the ecological and technological problems of the Earth, we must first solve the more basic human issues, like competition, jealousy, and fear that prevent human beings from living and working together in community.”

Duhm wanted to realize his vision of a thoroughly peaceful society and create a model – a prototype of a post-capitalistic, peaceful civilisation. This would include the peaceful cohabitation and cooperation with all creatures of nature (including bugs and vermin) and provide alternative types of energy supplies using inexhaustible energy sources rather than exploiting the earth, alternative types of architecture, of nourishment and of medicine, right up to a new understanding of the human world imbedded in a cosmic order.

Included in his basic theory was the concept of “free love.” (Duhm has used the term "free love" to describe "love free of fear.”) He thus attempted to “overtake the communist idea on the left” by expanding it into the erotic area, and soon became one of the main figures in the so-called “emancipation debate” concerning the connection between political work and personal liberation.

== Practical application ==
In 1978 Duhm began to put this theory into practise. First he created an interdisciplinary research center with a dozen experts from various fields, called the “Bauhuette,” located in southern Germany. Their goal was to find workable answers to the ecological and technological problems facing the human species at that time. However, within a few years they discovered that if their project had any chance of surviving, they first had to research more deeply into the core human relationship questions that lay hidden under all issues – such as competition, greed, and jealousy. So Duhm traveled around Germany, Austria, and Switzerland for a year, finding fifty willing participants who began a social community experiment in 1983 to research the possibilities of dissolving internal group conflicts concerning power, money, sexuality and love; and they spent three years in a remote area of the Black Forest under Duhm’s guidance.

But in 1984 a slanderous campaign in the media began against Duhm and his projects, both in Germany and Switzerland. This increasingly impeded the research work in the Black Forest, and finally disrupted it totally. The group’s attempt to have the information about them corrected remained unsuccessful, and the community finally had to disband.

== Tamera ==
So in 1989 Dieter Duhm moved to Lanzarote, together with his life partner, Sabine Lichtenfels, and several friends. For the next six years he dedicated his time to painting and writing, and found the peace and quiet he needed to research and prepare his next project.

In 1995, Duhm co-founded the Tamera Peace Research Center in southwestern Portugal together with Sabine Lichtenfels and Rainer Ehrenpreis. It was finally his chance to create a working model that put all his research into action, which he called “The Political Theory,” based in part on such concepts as holography, chaos theory, systems theory, and morphogenetic fields.

== Political theory ==
Duhm’s political theory contends that the basic building blocks of matter are not atoms, but instead are energy, frequency, and information. Earth with its atmosphere and magnetic field, with its waters and landscapes, with its creatures, biotopes and human societies, is an integral, oscillating and living body that can be healed, just as a human body can be healed if the appropriate “medicine,” i.e. the appropriate information, is administered, Duhm believes.

This healing information, Duhm says, is wanted most at the points where new wars are created daily: in the cohabitation of human beings. In this area far reaching change is necessary. Duhm feels that the peace information needed will emerge from social structures whose ethical basic values of compassion, trust, mutual support and solidarity are no longer being destroyed, but rather are generated and maintained; and Tamera is just one of several places necessary where the conditions for peaceful co-habitation are researched and put into practice.

Duhm explains his political theory in two books available in English: Future without War: Theory of Global Healing, and The Sacred Matrix: From the Matrix of Violence to the Matrix of Life; Foundations of a New Civilisation.

Decisive for the success of such peace projects is not how big and strong they are in comparison to the existing apparatuses but how comprehensive and complex they are, how many elements of life they are able to combine and to unite in a positive way. In the field buildings of evolution it is not the law of the strongest, but the success of the more comprehensive that counts. No new developments would otherwise have been able to assert themselves had they not all begun small and inconspicuous.

== Controversy ==
Duhm's stance on sexuality in his book Angst im Kapitalismus was heavily criticised, and he was accused of trivialising rape. He advocated that women harboured lifelong rape fantasies due to the unconscious desire to be raped by their own father and, in the event of a real rape, sometimes experienced their first orgasm as a result. Duhm wrote that women enjoy the violent satisfaction of their urges; those among them who were campaigning against rape were actually fighting their own desire for masochistic satisfaction. In his remarks on rape, he referred to the work of Freud student Helene Deutsch, on the phenomenon of female masochism.

== Healing biotopes ==
Duhm calls these places “Healing Biotopes” or "Peace Research Villages,” which act somewhat like acupuncture points to foster a new future in the body of Earth. His theory postulates that only a few such centers will be sufficient worldwide to tip over the “information field” of violence, for together these few centers will create the microscopically small change needed to have a large effect on the “Whole.”

== TerraNova ==
As these ideas became more and more concrete, they and the movement in the world that they represent came to be called "Terra Nova," which aims to create the conditions for a global system change for a nonviolent Earth, through activism, education and networking and by spreading perspectives for profoundly nonviolent culture based on trust and cooperation.

In 2015, Duhm wrote the book Terra Nova: Global Revolution and the Healing of Love to expound upon and clarify the basic ideas of the movement.

== Publications ==
- The Sacred Matrix: From the Matrix of Violence to the Matrix of Life; Foundations of a New Civilization. ISBN 978-3-927266-16-2, 464 pages, 2005. Republished as e-book ISBN 978-3-927266-51-3
- Man's Holy Grail is Woman: Paintings, drawings and texts by Dieter Duhm. ISBN 978-3-927266-21-6, 237 pages, April 2006
- Future without War: Theory of Global Healing. ISBN 978-3-927266-24-7, 120 pages, 2007
- Terra Nova: Global Revolution and the Healing of Love. ISBN 978-3-927266-54-4, 244 pages, 2015
