= Rhine Bridge, Germersheim (railway) =

Germersheim Rhine Bridge Rheinbrücke Germersheim
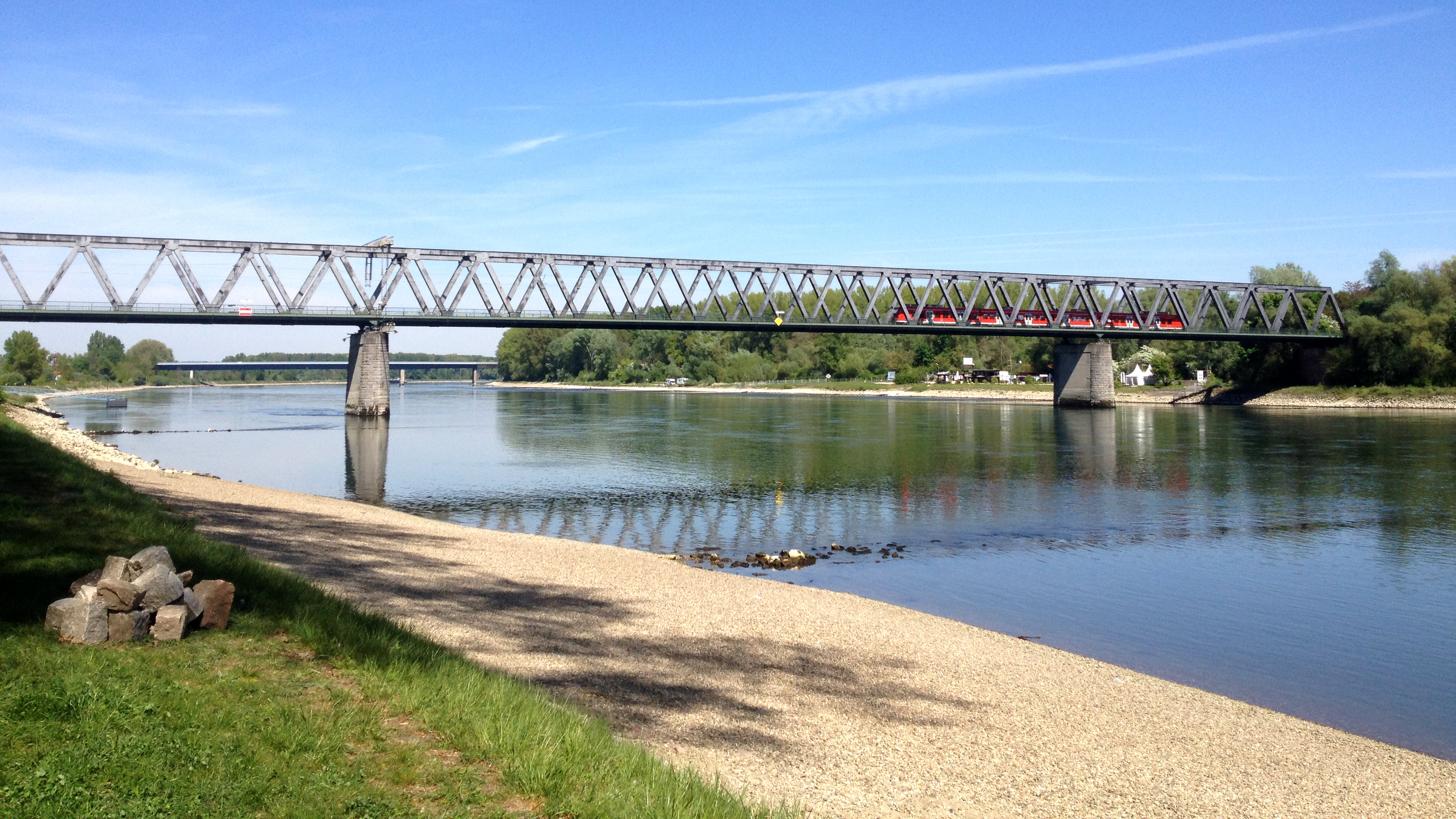
- Coordinates: 49°13′8″N 8°23′6″E
- Carries: Bruhrain Railway
- Crosses: Rhine
- Locale: Germersheim, Rhineland-Palatinate

Characteristics
- Design: Truss bridge
- Total length: 268 m (879 ft)
- Width: 9.5 m (31 ft)
- Longest span: 136 m (446 ft)

History
- Opened: 23 October 1967

The Germersheim Rhine Bridge (Rheinbrücke Germersheim) is a two-track railway bridge that crosses the Rhine near Germersheim in the German state of Rhineland-Palatinate. It forms part of the Germersheim–Bruchsal railway.

== Bridge of 1877 ==
In 1871, the Grand Duchy of Baden, which was located on the right (eastern) bank of the Rhine, and the Kingdom of Bavaria, which governed the Palatinate on the left (western) bank, agreed to build a railway line from Bruchsal to Germersheim, including a bridge over the Rhine. After lengthy discussions in 1874, it was decided to build the Rhine crossing north of the Germersheim fortress. Construction began in 1875 and the bridge was formally opened on 15 May 1877.

The bridge was 302 m long and consisted of three steel arch spans with the rail tracks lying below. The superstructures had a width of 7.6 m, each span had a length of 87.6 m and they carried two tracks. The bridge was strengthened from 1927 to 1930 in response to increased traffic loads. German troops destroyed the bridge by blowing up of a pier and an abutment on 24 March 1945 at 10.20 am.

== Bridge of 1967 ==
Since Deutsche Bundesbahn did not consider the Rhine Bridge necessary for operational reasons, it was not rebuilt immediately after the Second World War. It was not until 1965 that Deutsche Bundesbahn began the construction of a new Rhine crossing and it was opened on 23 October 1967. Funding was provided by the Federal Defence Ministry in response to the strategic interests of NATO. A three-span, pillar-free steel truss bridge with a through beam in the longitudinal direction was built by a joint venture of MAN Werk Gustavsburg and the Aug. Klönne company. The 268 m-long construction has 66 m-long outer spans and a central span of 136 m. The truss structure with parallel beams and an underlying deck has a distance between girders of 11 m in the side spans and 10.46 m in the main span across the ship channel. The height of the truss system is 10.0 m, the total height is 11.5 m and the distance between the main girders is 9.5 m. The diagonals and upper struts of the truss holders have 0.7 m wide box cross sections, with heights between 0.6 m and 0.76 m. The wooden sleepers are mounted directly on two continuous longitudinal beams. On the western bank, the truss bridge is attached to a 22 m-long approach bridge of prestressed concrete on a separating pillar.

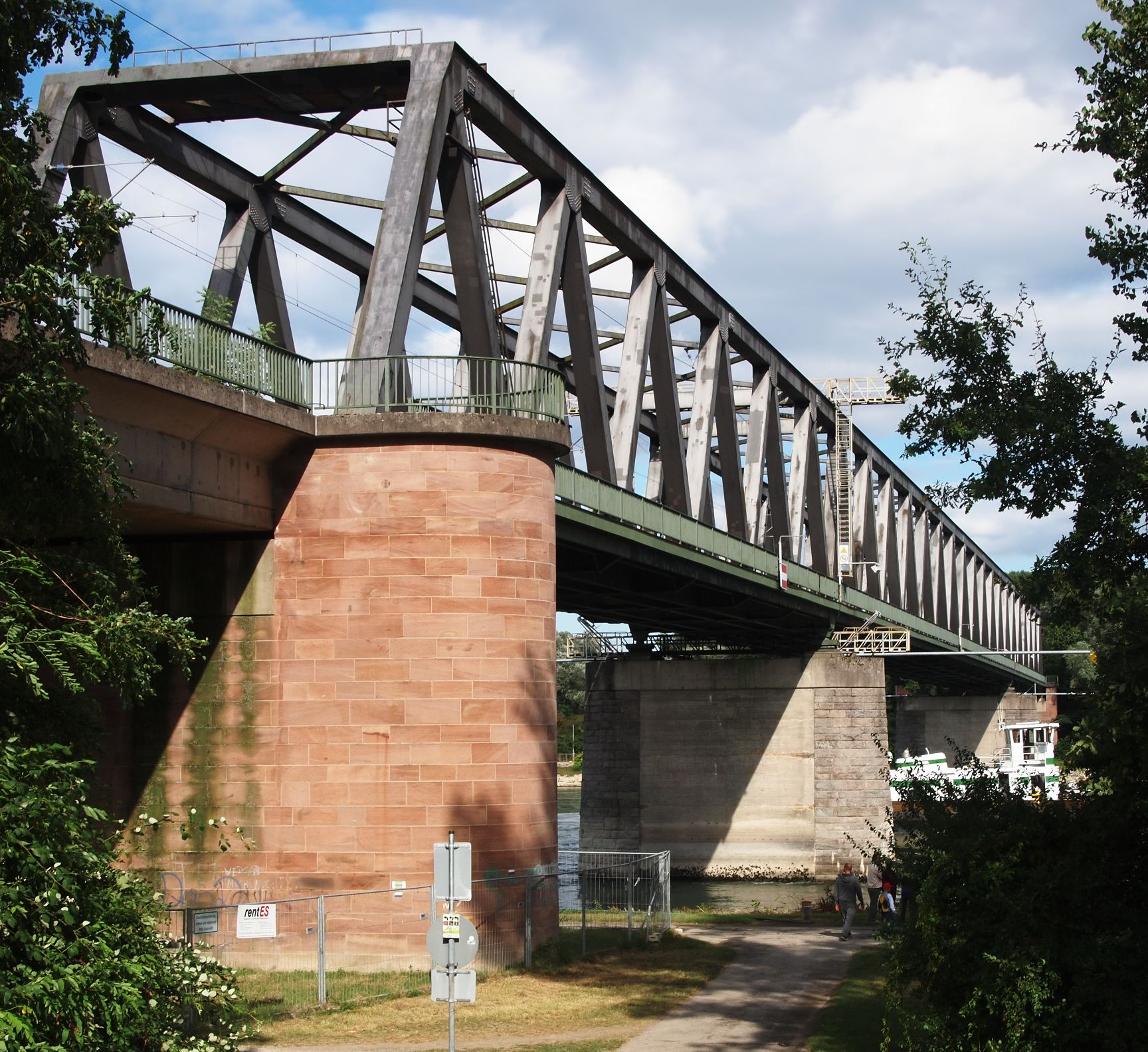
2016

Due to the curved tracks that follow the bridge, the tracks on the bridge are 15 cm off-centre.

With the lessening of military tensions the strategic interest in the bridge declined after 1989 and the southern track was closed in 1994.

it was electrified together with the Graben-Neudorf–Germersheim section of the Bruhrain Railway as part of the extension of the Rhine-Neckar S-Bahn at the end of 2011.

== See also ==
- List of bridges over the Rhine
- List of bridges in Germany

== Sources ==
=== References ===
- H.-J. Schröter: Die Eisenbahnbrücke über den Rhein bei Germersheim. In:Der Stahlbau 38, Jahrgang 1969, p. 22–24.
