= Florian Bellaire =

German politician (born 1985)

Member of the Landtag of Rhineland-Palatinate
- Incumbent
- Assumed office 4 December 2024
- Preceded by: Martin Brandl
- Constituency: Wörth am Rhein

Personal details
- Born: 22 October 1985 (age 40)
- Party: Christian Democratic Union

Florian Bellaire (born 22 October 1985) is a German politician serving as a member of the Landtag of Rhineland-Palatinate since 2024. He is a city councillor of Neupotz and a district councillor of Germersheim. He previously served as chief of staff to Thomas Gebhart.
