= Dampfnudel =

German dumpling

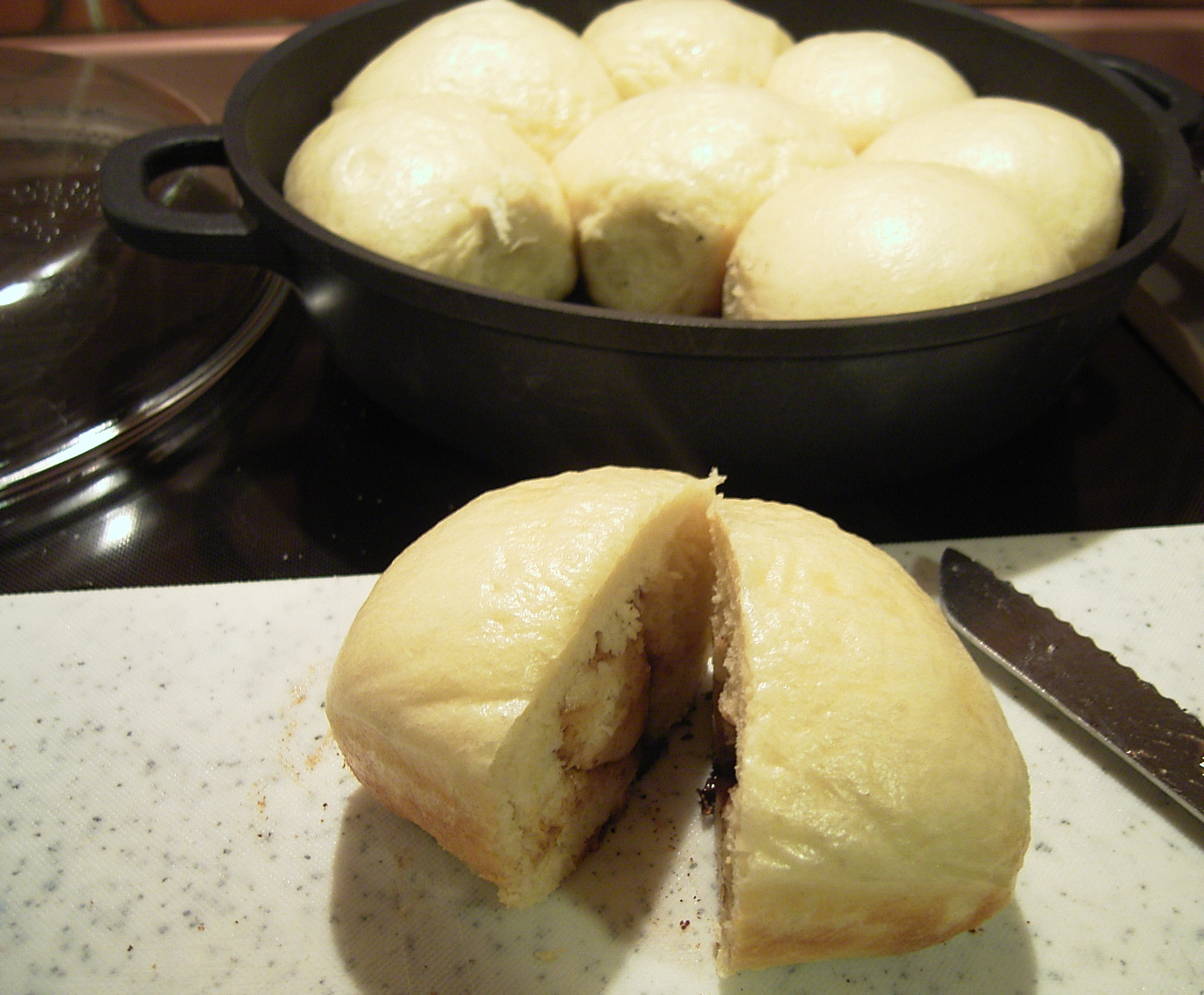
- Type: Dumpling
- Place of origin: Germany and Alsace
- Main ingredients: Flour, water, yeast, butter or margarine; sometimes eggs or sugar

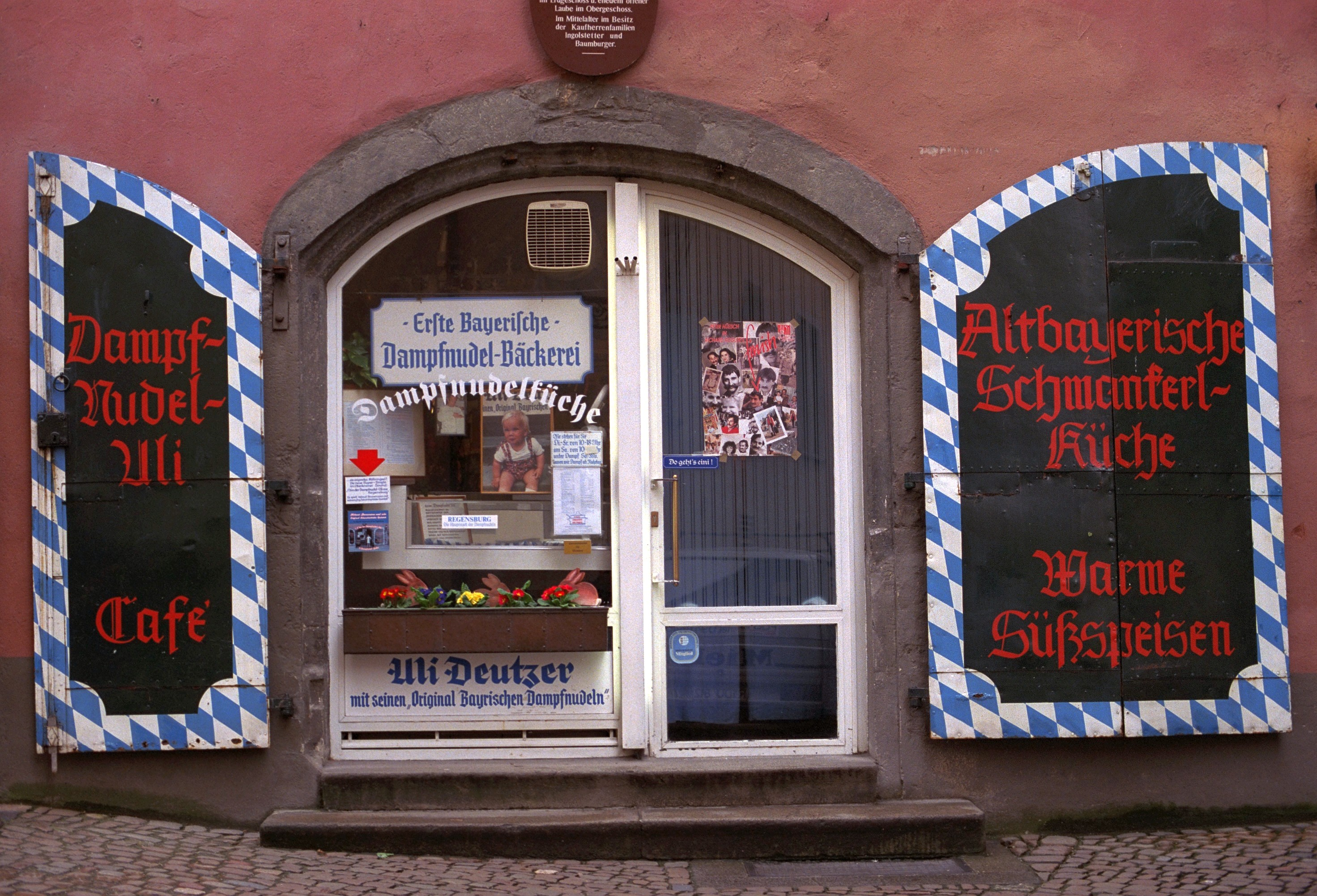
Dampfnudel bakery in Regensburg

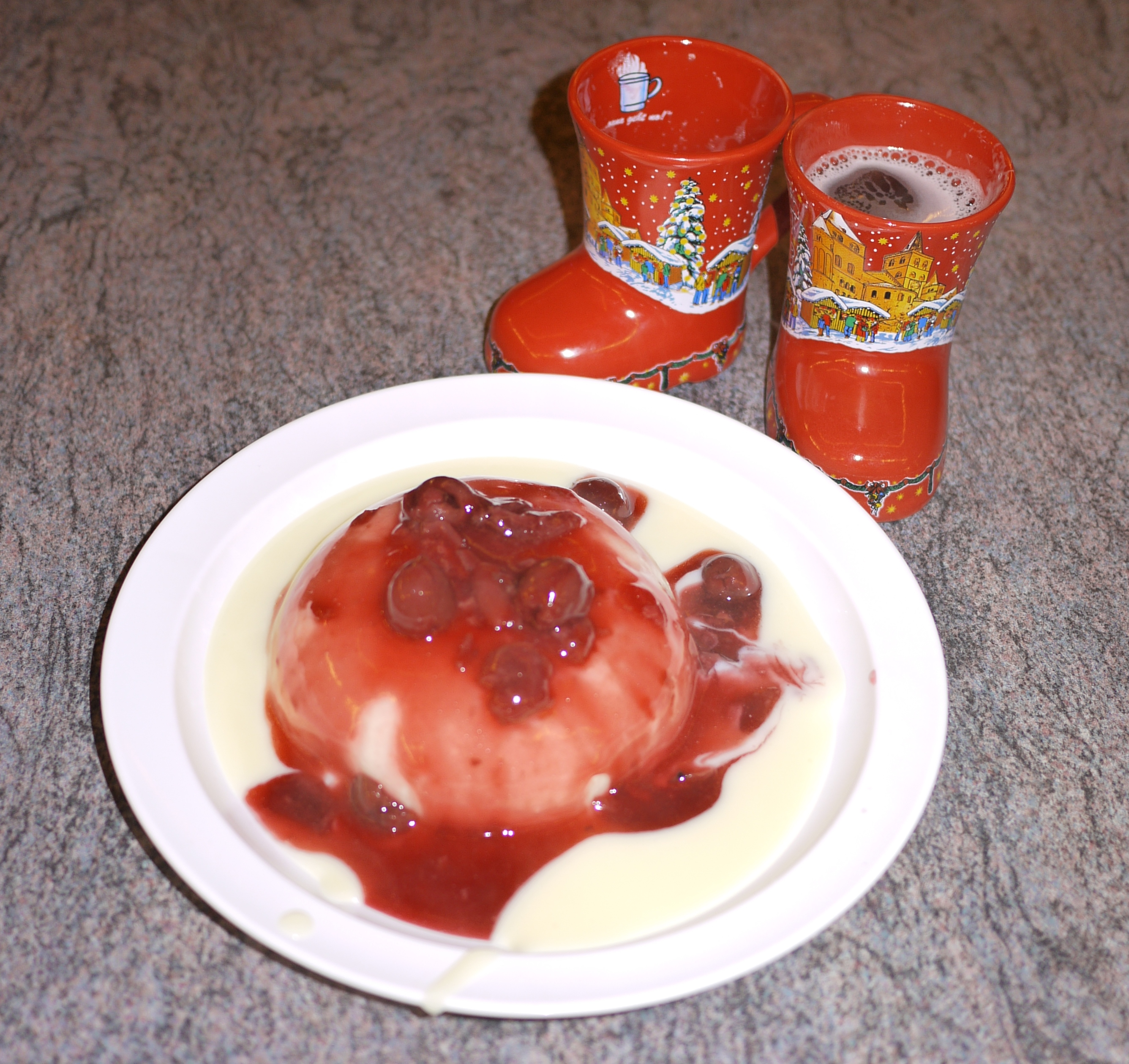
Christmas Dampfnudel

A Dampfnudel (German pronunciation: [ˈdamp͡fˌnuːdl̩]; lit. 'steam noodle'; plural Dampfnudeln, Alsatian: Dampfnüdel) is a dumpling eaten as a meal or as a dessert in Southern Germany, Austria, Switzerland, and in France (Alsace-Moselle). It is a typical dish in southern Germany.

== History ==
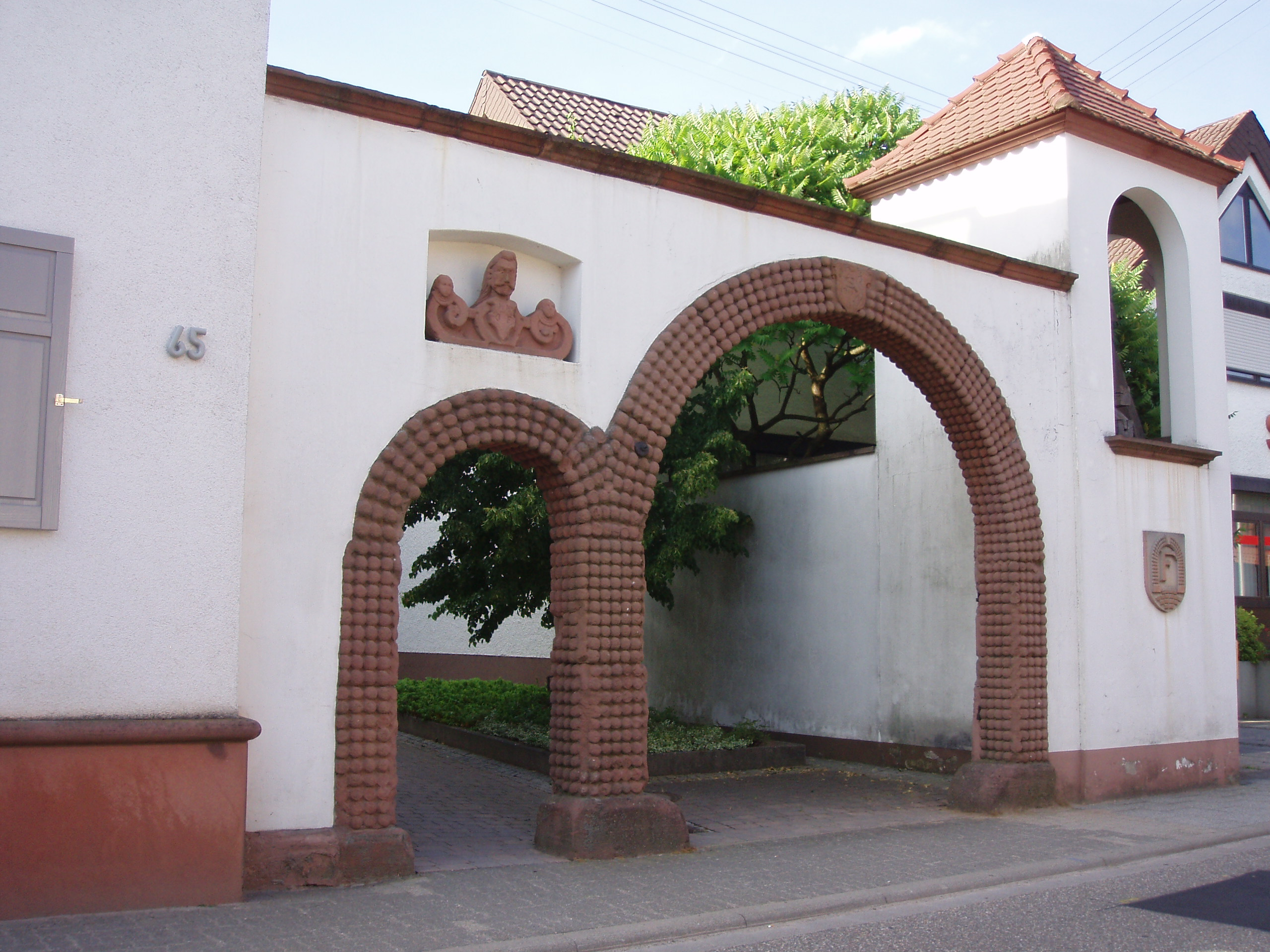
Dampfnudeltor at Freckenfeld, Rhineland-Palatinate

The origin of the Dampfnudel is unclear. Friederike Luise Löffler, housekeeper at the ducal court of Württemberg in Stuttgart, listed various Dampfnudel recipes in her 1791 book Neues Kochbuch oder geprüfte Anweisung zur schmackhaften Zubereitung (New Cookbook or Proven Instructions for Tasty Preparation), Stuttgart cook Friederike Luise Löffler listed various Dampfnudel recipes, one of which was explicitly referred to as Bavarian Dampfnudel. There are Dampfnudel city gates in Freckenfeld and Kandel, two towns in the Rhineland-Palatinate, in western Germany, near the border with French Alsace. It is reputed that, during the Thirty Years' War, Swedish troops arrived at Freckenfeld and demanded ransom. Master baker Johannes Muck, with his wife and apprentice, made 1,286 Dampfnudeln to feed the soldiers, who then spared the village from further extortion and pillage. The Dampfnudeltor (Dampfnudel gate) even features on the coat of arms of the municipality of Freckenfeld.

== Ingredients and preparation ==
Dampfnudeln are made from a dough composed of white flour, water, yeast, salt, butter or margarine, and sometimes also eggs and a little sugar. The dough is formed into balls about the size of an egg, left to rise and then cooked in a covered pot, preferably a high-rimmed iron pan with a lid, either in a mixture of milk and butter (the Bavarian style) or salt water and fat (the Rhineland-Palatinate style) until a golden-brown crust forms at the bottom after the liquid has evaporated. The tops remain white.

== Serving ==
Dampfnudeln are typically served as a main course with savoury accompaniment such as cabbage, salad, gherkins, potato soup, lentil soup, or mushrooms in a béchamel sauce. They can also be served as a dessert with vanilla custard, jam, or boiled fruit. In Bavaria, however, Dampfnudeln are traditionally served as the main dish even though they are normally served sweet. In the Palatinate they are served as a main dish and with a salty crust.

== See also ==
- Buchteln
- Germknödel
- List of buns
- List of desserts
- List of steamed foods
- List of sweet breads
- Mantou
- Siopao
