= Otto Herzog =

German paramilitary leader and politician

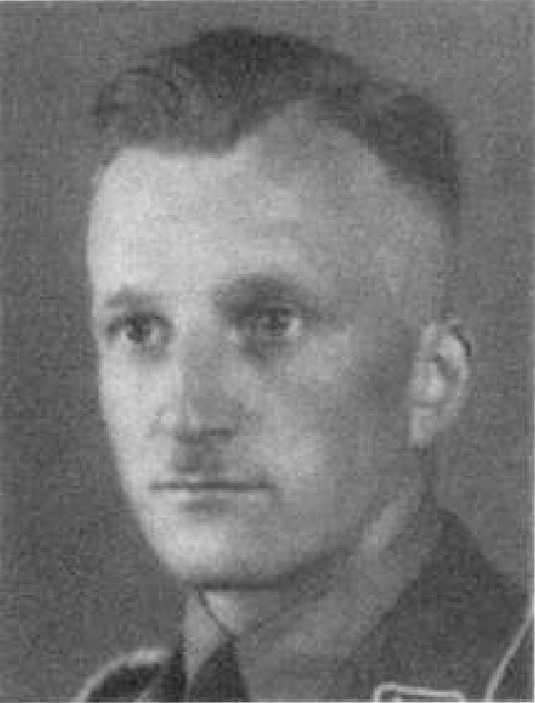
- Herzog c. 1938

Volkssturm Führer, Breslau
- In office February 1945 – 6 May 1945

Inspector of Gebirgsjäger, Supreme SA Command
- In office 1 February 1942 – 6 May 1945

Führer, SA-Gruppe "Schlesien"
- In office 15 June 1939 – 1 February 1942
- Preceded by: Heinrich Georg Wilhelm Graf Finck von Finckenstein
- Succeeded by: Richard Aster

Stabsführer, Supreme SA Command
- In office 1 May 1936 – 14 June 1939
- Succeeded by: Max Jüttner

Führer, SA-Gruppe "Schlesien"
- In office 10 July 1934 – 31 July 1936
- Preceded by: Edmund Heines
- Succeeded by: Heinrich Georg Wilhelm Graf Finck von Finckenstein

Personal details
- Born: 30 October 1900 Zeiskam, Rhenish Palatinate, Kingdom of Bavaria, German Empire
- Died: 6 May 1945 (aged 44) Breslau, Nazi Germany
- Cause of death: Possible suicide or killed in action
- Party: Nazi Party
- Occupation: Soldier; Sales assistant
- Civilian awards: Golden Party Badge; Blood Order

Military service
- Allegiance: German Empire; Weimar Republic; Nazi Germany
- Branch/service: Imperial German Army; Reichswehr; German Army
- Years of service: 1917–1918; 1919–1923; 1939–1945
- Rank: Unteroffizier; Oberleutnant
- Battles/wars: World War I; World War II
- Military awards: Knight's Cross of the Iron Cross; War Merit Cross, 1st class with Swords

Otto Friedrich Herzog (30 October 1900 – 6 May 1945) was a German Nazi Party politician and SA-Obergruppenführer. During the closing months of the Second World War, he commanded the Volkssturm forces during the siege of Breslau and died there when the city fell to the Red Army in May 1945.

== Early life ==
Herzog was born the son of an innkeeper in Zeiskam, in the Rhenish Palatinate. After attending elementary school from 1907 to 1914, and two years of vocational school, he began an apprenticeship in trade in Landau in December 1916 but enlisted as a cadet in the Bavarian Non-commissioned Officer Training School in Fürstenfeldbruck on 1 June 1917. Sworn in on 13 October, he was discharged at the end of the First World War in November 1918 without having seen combat. From 1 May to 30 September 1919, Herzog was part of the Freikorps led by Franz Ritter von Epp, and was involved in the suppression of the Bavarian Soviet Republic. During this action in early May, he was seriously wounded when he was shot in the lung, abdomen and upper left arm. Beginning in October 1919, Herzog served in the Reichswehr with the 41st Rifle Regiment in Munich. He was also a member of the military association Bund Reichskriegsflagge ('imperial war flag league') that was headed by Ernst Röhm, and participated with it in Adolf Hitler's Beer Hall Putsch in November 1923, for which he would later be awarded the Blood Order. As a participant in the failed coup, he was dismissed from the Reichswehr at the end of December. From 1924 to May 1929, he worked as a sales assistant.

== Nazi Party political career ==
Herzog formally joined the Nazi Party on 21 June 1926 (membership number 38,960). As an early Party adherent, he would later be awarded the Golden Party Badge. From 1926, he was the Ortsgruppenleiter of the Party's local branch in Varel in the Free State of Oldenburg. In 1927 he advanced to Bezirksleiter of the Varel district and from 1928 to 1929 he was the Gaugeschäftsführer ('business manager') in the Gau leadership office in Oldenburg. From 1929 to 1933 he was the Gau Organization Leader in Gau Weser-Ems, and he worked full-time for the Party from 1930 onward.

Herzog was elected to the Oldenburg City Council on 1 November 1930, and led the Nazi Party faction there. In May 1931, he was elected to the Oldenburg Landtag and was the chairman of the Nazi Party parliamentary group in that body, serving until its dissolution in October 1933. He was the publisher and editor of the Nazi Party daily newspaper Der Freiheitskampfer ('the freedom fighter') in Oldenburg, from 1 August 1932. In 1933 and 1934, he published the Oldenburgische Staatszeitung ('Oldenburg state newspaper'). In the July 1932 German federal election, he was elected as a deputy to the Reichstag for electoral constituency 14, Weser-Ems, but was defeated in the November 1932 German federal election when the Nazis lost electoral support. He was again elected in March 1933, remaining a deputy until the end of the Nazi regime in May 1945, switching to constituency 7, Breslau, at the 1936 election. In August 1944, he was assigned as a lay judge to the People's Court.

== Service in the Sturmabteilung (SA) ==
On 21 June 1926, Herzog joined the SA, the Party's paramilitary organization, and was assigned to SA-Sturm 55, which he helped to organize, becoming its leader the next year. He then commanded the SA-Standarte 91 from October 1928 through September 1929, and then the SA-Brigade Weser-Ems until 9 August 1933, serving as the SA-Gausturmführer for the Weser-Ems Gau throughout this time. On 10 July 1934, Herzog was assigned the leadership of the SA-Gruppe Schlesien (Silesia), headquartered in Breslau, as the successor to Edmund Heines, who was murdered in the Night of the Long Knives. On 1 May 1936, he advanced to the SA central leadership in Munich, as the Stabsführer in the SA Supreme Leadership. Herzog was promoted steadily through the ranks of the SA, culminating in his appointment as an SA-Obergruppenführer on 9 November 1936. On 15 June 1939, he returned to his former regional command in Silesia. On 1 February 1942, he was again returned to the central leadership, as Inspector of the SA Gebirgsjäger ('mountain troops').

== War service and death ==
On the outbreak of the Second World War, Herzog volunteered for service with the German army and was assigned to Infanterie Regiment 49 as an Unteroffizier of reserves. He was commissioned as a Leutnant of reserves on 1 February 1940 and served as a company commander. He was wounded in action on the western front on 15 May 1940, earning the Iron Cross, 1st and 2nd class. He was promoted to Oberleutnant on 1 November 1942 and assigned to the military district in Breslau on 1 July 1943.

In the closing months of the war, Breslau was surrounded and besieged for 82 days by the Red Army, beginning in February 1945. Herzog remained in the city, which was declared a Festung ('fortress city'), was given command of its Volkssturm, or Nazi Party militia unit, and was awarded the Knight's Cross of the Iron Cross on 15 April for his efforts leading a Kampfgruppe ('battle group') in defending the city. When the commandant of the city, General der Infanterie Hermann Niehoff on 5 May informed his senior commanders of his decision to surrender the city, only Herzog dissented. Herzog died the following day, when Breslau surrendered. Richard Hargreaves writes that "Herzog's fate is unclear. Some reports say that he shot himself, others that he tried to escape the fortress and was killed when his car struck a mine [per Andreas Schulz, on the Schießwerderbrücke, together with SA-Gruppenführer Aster]."

The historian Werner Vahlenkamp characterizes Herzog as a former Freikorps fighter who belonged to "the group of particularly brutal and fanatical National Socialists" and was "throughout his life, uncritically affiliated with the party".

SA Ranks
| Date | Rank |
|---|---|
| 1927 | SA-Sturmführer |
| 1 April 1930 | SA-Standartenführer |
| 1 July 1932 | SA-Oberführer |
| 1 April 1933 | SA-Gruppenführer |
| 11 November 1936 | SA-Obergruppenführer |

== Sources ==
- Hargreaves, Richard (2011). Hitler's Final Fortress: Breslau 1945. Pen and Sword Military. ISBN 978-1-848-84515-2.
- Information about Otto Herzog in the Reichstag database
- Miller, Michael D.; Schulz, Andreas (2015). Leaders of the Storm Troops. Vol. 1. Solihull, England: Helion & Company. ISBN 978-1-909-98287-1.
- Scherzer, Veit [in German] (2007). Ritterkreuzträger 1939–1945 [The Knight's Cross Bearers 1939–1945] (in German) (2nd ed.). Ranis: Verlag Veit Scherzer. ISBN 978-3-938845-17-2. OCLC 891773959. Wikidata Q131160320.
- Vahlenkamp, Werner (1992). "Herzog, Otto". In Hans Friedl (ed.). Biographisches Handbuch zur Geschichte des Landes Oldenburg (in German). Oldenburg: Isensee Verlag. pp. 308–309. ISBN 978-3-894-42135-9.
