= Nevfel Cumart =

German author

Nevfel Cumart (born May 31, 1964, in Lingenfeld) is a German author, lecturer, literary translator and journalist of Turkish descent.

== Life ==
He grew up in Stade and attended the local grammar school Vincent-Lübeck-Gymnasium. After completing his Abitur, the general qualification for university entrance, he embarked upon an apprenticeship as a carpenter. In the winter of 1986, he started studying Turkology, Arabic studies, Persian and Islamic studies in Bamberg. He has been living as a freelance writer, speaker, translator and journalist in Stegaurach, near Bamberg, Germany, since 1993.

In 1983, he published his first of sixteen (as of 2015) poetry books, placing Cumart among Germany's most productive contemporary German poets. Having been awarded several prizes, Cumart has not only focused on poetry but has also published a collection of short stories, prose, essays and literary essays in a variety of anthologies and specialist publications. Some of his poems have been translated into Polish, Russian and Greek, with two of his poetry books appearing in a bilingual German/English edition. He has translated into German various works by Turkish authors, including Yaşar Kemal and Aziz Nesin.

Cumart has been head of the literature section of Bamberg-based magazine "Fränkische Nacht" since 1992 and is a freelance journalist working for the culture sections of German daily newspapers Fränkischer Tag and Nürnberger Nachrichten. He holds talks and runs seminars on a variety of topics such as Turkey, migration in Germany, and Islam. His readings and papers have often taken him abroad (e.g. England, Ireland, Turkey, Switzerland, Poland).

Cumart is chair of the literary society "Neue Gesellschaft für Literatur Erlangen e.V." (NGL), as well as being a member of P.E.N.-Zentrum Deutschland and the Rotary club Bamberg-Domreiter. He has a seat on the board of the German writers’ society Verband Deutscher Schriftsteller(VS), Regional Group Upper Franconia and also sits on the Academic Advisory Board of the Georges – Anawati Grant, a foundation promoting interreligious and intercultural dialogue.

== Achievements ==
- Autorenförderung der Stadt Stade 1989
- Literatur-Förderpreis des Landes Rheinland-Pfalz 1992
- Autorenstipendium der Stadt Bamberg 1993
- Staatlicher Förderungspreis für Literatur des Landes Bayern 1995
- Aufenthaltsstipendium im Literarischen Colloquium Berlin (LCB) 1995 und 1996
- Übersetzerstipendium der Yamantürk Stiftung Istanbul 1998
- Kulturpreis der E.ON Bayern AG 2008
- Kulturpreis der Oberfrankenstiftung 2009
- Pax-Bank-Preis 2011 auf Vorschlag der Georges-Anawati-Stiftung
- Poetik-Professur der Leopold-Franzens-Universität Innsbruck 2012
- Bundesverdienstkreuz am Bande 2014
- „Künstler des Monats" der Metropolregion Nürnberg 2016
- "Writer in Residence", Deutsches Kulturzentrum Tampere und Goethe Institut Finnland

== Works ==
=== Poetry ===
- Im Spiegel. Stade: Järnecke Verlag, 1983
- Herz in der Schlinge. Stade: Törtel Verlag, 1985
- Ein Schmelztiegel im Flammenmeer. Frankfurt: Dagyeli Verlag, 1988
- Das ewige Wasser. Düsseldorf: Grupello Verlag, 1990.
- Das Lachen bewahren. Düsseldorf: Grupello Verlag, 1993
- Ebedi Su. Eskisehir: Eskisehir Universitätsverlag, 1995
- Verwandlungen. Düsseldorf: Grupello Verlag, 1995.
- Zwei Welten. Düsseldorf: Grupello Verlag, 1996.
- Schlaftrunken die Sterne. Düsseldorf: Grupello Verlag, 1997
- Waves of time / Wellen der Zeit. Düsseldorf: Grupello Verlag, 1998
- Auf den Märchendächern. Düsseldorf: Grupello Verlag, 1999
- Ich pflanze Saatgut in Träume. Düsseldorf: Grupello Verlag, 2000
- Seelenbilder. Düsseldorf: Grupello Verlag, 2001
- Unterwegs zu Hause. Düsseldorf: Grupello Verlag, 2003
- Beyond Words – Jenseits der Worte. Düsseldorf: Grupello Verlag, 2006
- Dem Leben entgegen. Düsseldorf. Gruppelo Verlag, 2009
- Unter den Flügeln der Nacht. Grupello Verlag, Düsseldorf 2012
- Feuerzunge. Grupello Verlag, Düsseldorf 2015
- Wüstenakazie. Grupello Verlag, Düsseldorf 2015

=== Stories ===
- Hochzeit mit Hindernissen. Düsseldorf: Grupello Verlag, 1998

=== Editorships ===
- Generation 3000. DTV Verlag München 1998;
- Steintaube – Tas Güvercin. Unionsverlag Zürich 1998;
- Ein Haus aus Sternsteinen bauen. Spätlese Verlag Nürnberg 2008;
- Die Farben der Fremde. Genniges Verlag Bamberg 2009;
- Die Entdeckung der Worte. Genniges Verlag Bamberg 2010;
- Strandgut. Genniges Verlag Bamberg 2011.

=== Contributions in anthologies (selection) ===
- Selbstporträt – Literatur in Franken. ars vivendi Verlag, Cadolzburg 1999;
- Fund im Sand. Delp Verlag, Bad Windsheim 2000;
- Sei amoll still und horch zu. Verlag Walter E. Keller, 2001
- Lyrik lesen! Eine Bamberger Anthologie. Grupello Verlag, Düsseldorf 2000;
- Uns reichts! Ein Lesebuch gegen Rechts. Geest-Verlag, Ahlhorn 2001;
- Aller Menschen Würde. Verlag Sauerländer, Aarau 2001.
- Frei von Furcht und Not. Patmos Verlag 2004.
- 30. Anthologie. Vetter-Verlag Geldersheim, 2007
- Vom Zauber der Buchstaben. Omnibus Verlag 2007
- Ein Haus aus Sternsteinen bauen. Spätlese Verlag 2008
- Zeichen & Wunder. Perpetuum publishing Verlag Bamberg 2011
- Mitten in Deutschland. Herder Verlag 2011
- Rock Lyrik. DTV Verlag München, 2011

=== Translations from Turkish ===
- Yasar Kemal. Der Baum des Narren. Roman. Unionsverlag Zürich, 1997.
- Fazil Hüsnü Daglarca: Steintaube – Tas Güvercin. Gedichte. Unionsverlag Zürich, 1998.
- Yasar Nuri Öztürk: 400 Fragen zum Islam – 400 Antworten. Grupello Verlag Düsseldorf, 2000.
- Yasar Kemal. Gut geflunkert, Zilo! Roman. Baobab Verlag Zürich, 2002.
- Yasar Nuri Öztürk: Rumi und die islamische Mystik: Über das Menschenbild im IslamGrupello Verlag Düsseldorf, 2002.
- Celil Oker: Letzter Akt am Bosporus. Roman. Unionsverlag Zürich, 2004.
- Yasar Nuri Öztürk: Der verfälschte Islam. Grupello Verlag Düsseldorf, 2007.
- Celil Oker: Dunkle Geschäfte am Bosporus. Roman. Unionsverlag Zürich, 2008.
- M. Rami Ayas: Henna Gefärbte Felsen – Kinali Kayalar. Gedichte. Genniges Verlag, Bamberg. 2011.

== See also ==
- German–Turkish Literature (In German)
- List of German–Turkish Authors (In German)
