= Lingenfeld =

- Municipality
- Coat of arms

- Location of Lingenfeld within Germersheim district
- Interactive map of Lingenfeld
- Location within Germany Location within Rhineland-Palatinate
- Coordinates: 49°14′43″N 8°20′40″E
- Country: Germany
- State: Rhineland-Palatinate
- District: Germersheim
- Municipal assoc.: Lingenfeld

Government
  - Mayor (2019–24): Markus Kropfreiter (SPD)

Area
  - Total: 15.33 km^{2} (5.92 sq mi)
- Elevation: 104 m (341 ft)

Population (2025-12-31)
  - Total: 5,890
  - Density: 384/km^{2} (995/sq mi)
- Time zone: UTC+01:00 (CET)
  - Summer (DST): UTC+02:00 (CEST)
- Postal codes: 67360
- Dialling codes: 06344
- Vehicle registration: GER
- Website: www.lingenfeld.de

Lingenfeld (Palatine German: Lingefeld) is a municipality in the district of Germersheim, in Rhineland-Palatinate, Germany. It is situated approximately 5 km north-west of Germersheim, and 10 km south-west of Speyer.

Lingenfeld has about 5,800 citizens (2020) and is continuously growing because of its good connections to nearby cities such as Speyer, Mannheim, Ludwigshafen and Karlsruhe via the S-Bahn ("suburban railway").

Lingenfeld is the seat of the Verbandsgemeinde ("collective municipality") Lingenfeld.

== Geography ==
Lingenfeld is located in the Upper Rhine valley in the south of the German wine-growing region Palatinate ("Pfalz") in Rhineland-Palatinate. Close by are the river Rhine in the East of the village and the German Wine Route to the West. Neighbouring places are Römerberg (Pfalz) to the north, Schwegenheim and Westheim (Pfalz) to the west, Germersheim to the south and the frontier to Baden-Württemberg realised through the cut-off meander of the Rhine to the east.

In past centuries the old current of the Rhine caused the loss of about 250 hectares of land due to undermining of the banks.

Lingenfeld lies 104 meters higher than the other communities close to the Rhine, so danger of flooding can be almost entirely excluded.

== History ==
The name Lingenfeld probably comes from settlement "at the long field". It was first mentioned in a document from 1163 as "Lengenveld".

== Religions ==
In 2007 53,3 percent of the inhabitants were Roman Catholic and 22 percent Protestant. The rest belonged to a different religion or was undenominational.

== Development of inhabitants ==
Year	Population
1480	c. 180
1530	c. 180
1705	c. 257
1742	c. 500
1771	c. 585

Year	Population
1806	871
1833	1229
1890	1556
1925	2270
1953	3000

Year	Population
1967	3740
1977	4172
1984	4055
2001	5473
2004	5870
