= Vollmersweiler =

- Municipality
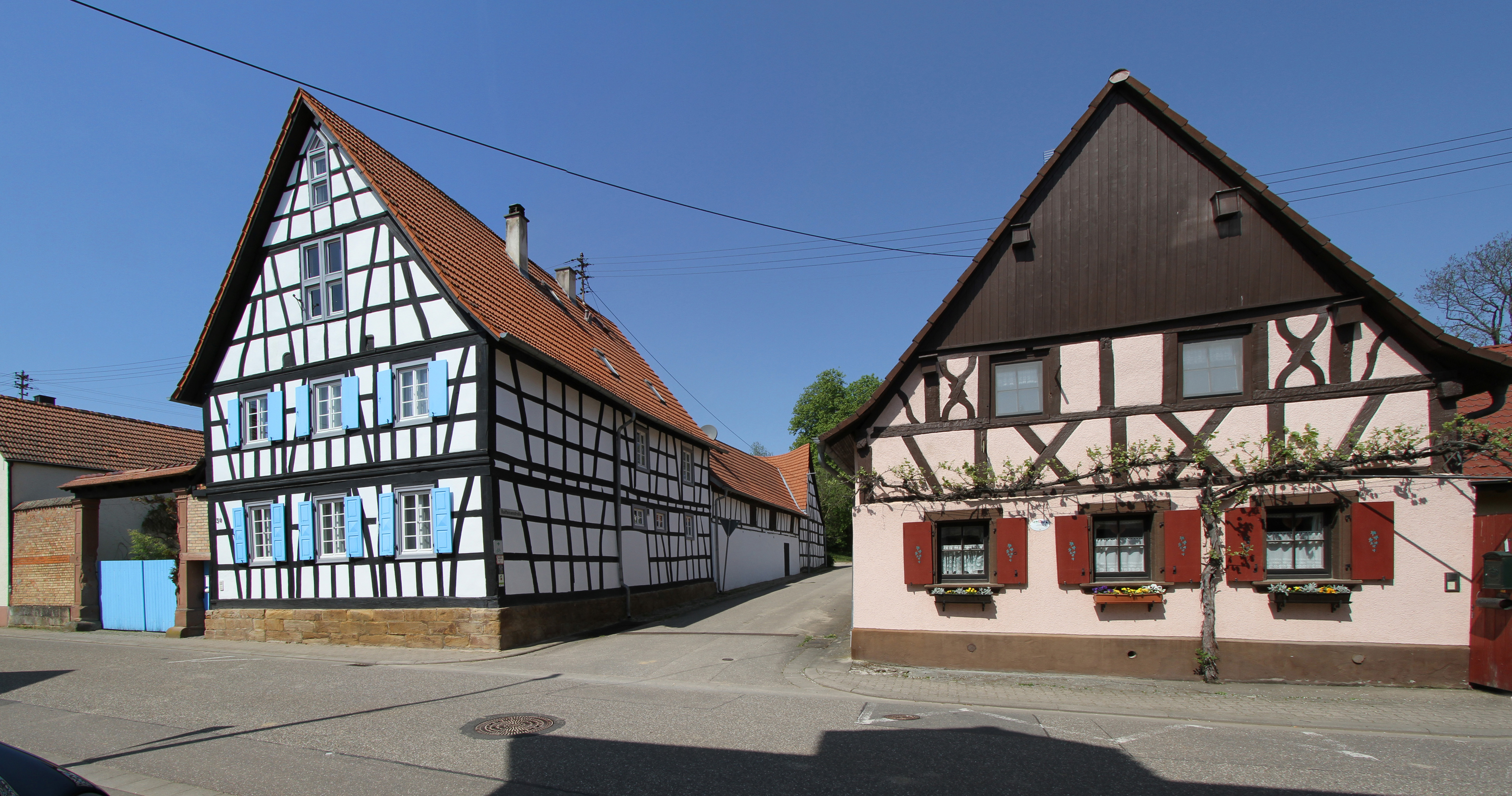

- Coat of arms

- Location of Vollmersweiler within Germersheim district
- Interactive map of Vollmersweiler
- Location within Germany Location within Rhineland-Palatinate
- Coordinates: 49°03′53″N 08°04′37″E
- Country: Germany
- State: Rhineland-Palatinate
- District: Germersheim
- Municipal assoc.: Kandel

Government
  - Mayor (2019–24): Roland Kelemen

Area
  - Total: 2.18 km^{2} (0.84 sq mi)
- Elevation: 142 m (466 ft)

Population (2025-12-31)
  - Total: 207
  - Density: 95.0/km^{2} (246/sq mi)
- Time zone: UTC+01:00 (CET)
  - Summer (DST): UTC+02:00 (CEST)
- Postal codes: 76744
- Dialling codes: 06340
- Vehicle registration: GER
- Website: www.vg-kandel.de

Vollmersweiler is a municipality in the district of Germersheim, in Rhineland-Palatinate, Germany.

== Location ==
The village is located in the southern Palatinate between Karlsruhe and Landau. Since 1972 the community has belonged to the Kandel municipal association, whose administrative headquarters is in the town of Kandel.

== History ==
Vollmersweiler once belonged to the lords of Guttenberg castle. For a time in the 18th century it shared a Schultheiß with the town of Niederotterbach on the west.

== Religion ==
In 2007, 50% of the population was Protestant and 24.8% Catholic. The remainder belonged to a different religion or none.

== Government ==
The council consists of seven council members, including the mayor. The mayor, Roland Kelemen, was elected in 9 June 2024.

== Coat of arms ==
The blazon of the arms is: In red a slanting silver plowblade.

It was approved in 1931 by the Bavarian State Ministry of the Interior and goes back to a common judicial seal of and Niederotterbach from the year 1581.
