= Ottersheim bei Landau =

- Municipality
- Flag Coat of arms

- Location of Ottersheim bei Landau within Germersheim district
- Interactive map of Ottersheim bei Landau
- Location within Germany Location within Rhineland-Palatinate
- Coordinates: 49°11′26″N 08°13′49″E
- Country: Germany
- State: Rhineland-Palatinate
- District: Germersheim
- Municipal assoc.: Bellheim

Government
  - Mayor (2019–24): Gerald Job

Area
  - Total: 7.90 km^{2} (3.05 sq mi)
- Elevation: 124 m (407 ft)

Population (2025-12-31)
  - Total: 1,851
  - Density: 234/km^{2} (607/sq mi)
- Time zone: UTC+01:00 (CET)
  - Summer (DST): UTC+02:00 (CEST)
- Postal codes: 76879
- Dialling codes: 06348
- Vehicle registration: GER
- Website: www.ottersheim-pfalz.de

Ottersheim bei Landau is a municipality in the district of Germersheim, in Rhineland-Palatinate, Germany.

Town coat of arms

Town flag

Town "Banner" (vertical flag for hoisting from a horizontal pole)

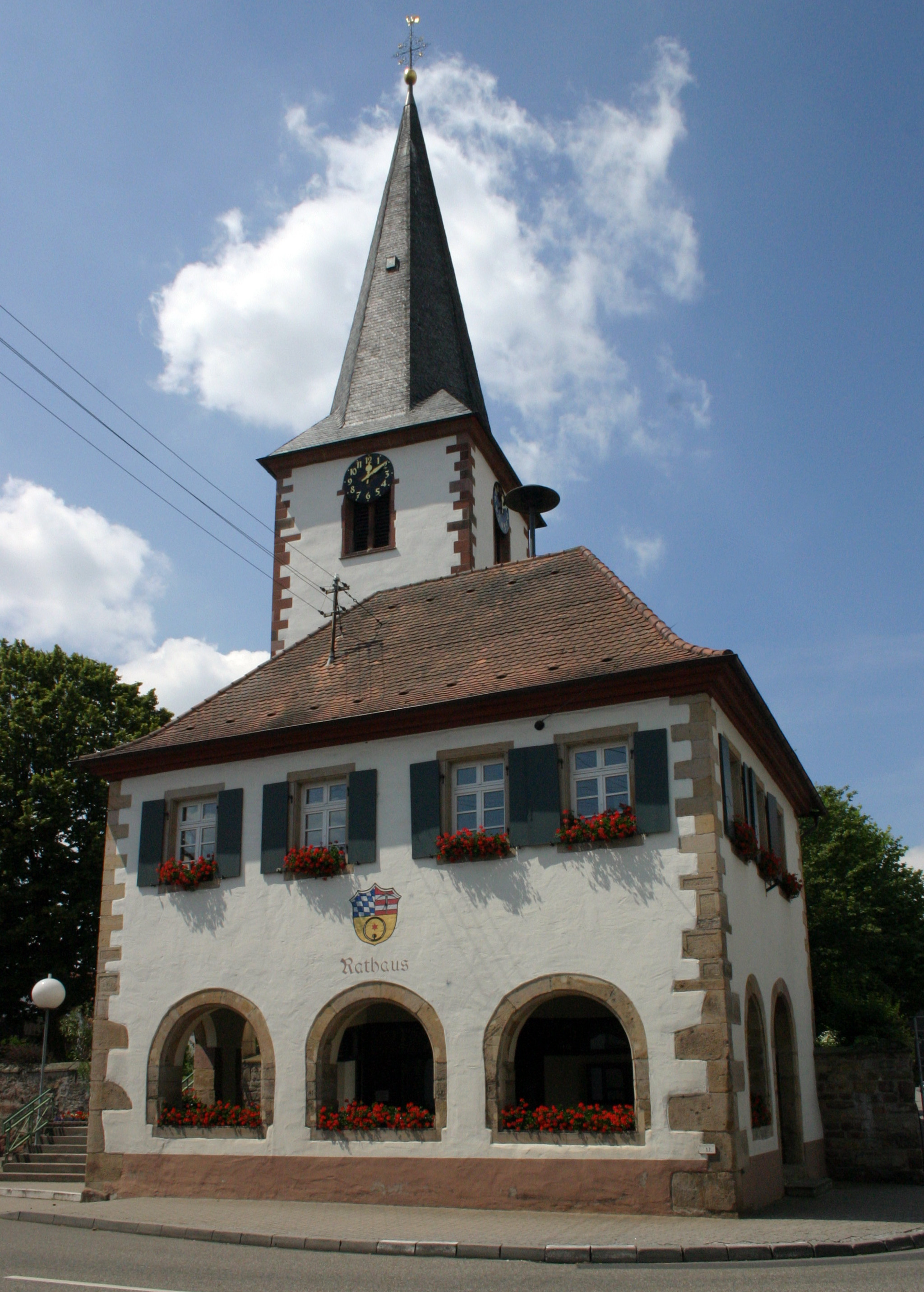
Town hall and catholic church
