= Steinweiler =

- Municipality
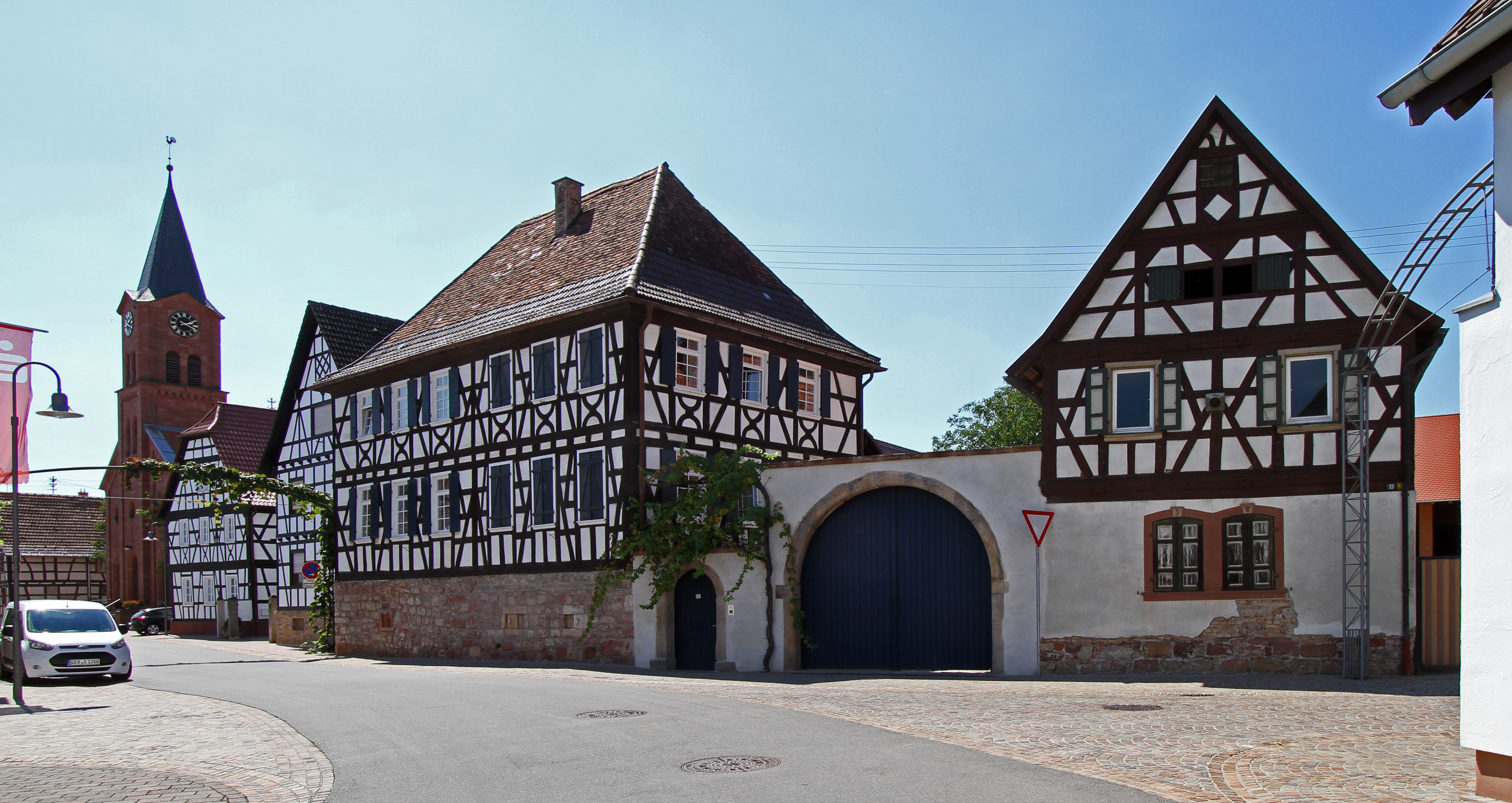

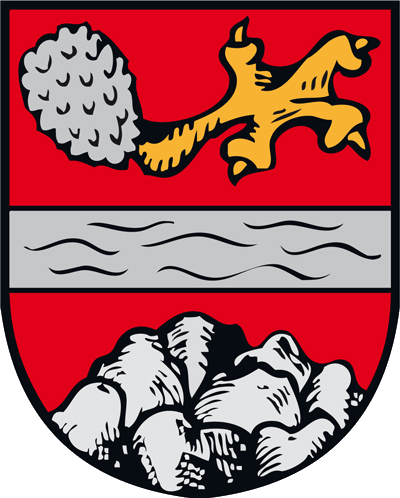
- Coat of arms

- Location of Steinweiler within Germersheim district
- Interactive map of Steinweiler
- Location within Germany Location within Rhineland-Palatinate
- Coordinates: 49°07′15″N 08°08′29″E
- Country: Germany
- State: Rhineland-Palatinate
- District: Germersheim
- Municipal assoc.: Kandel

Government
  - Mayor (2019–24): Michael Detzel (CDU)

Area
  - Total: 11.88 km^{2} (4.59 sq mi)
- Elevation: 129 m (423 ft)

Population (2025-12-31)
  - Total: 2,016
  - Density: 169.7/km^{2} (439.5/sq mi)
- Time zone: UTC+01:00 (CET)
  - Summer (DST): UTC+02:00 (CEST)
- Postal codes: 76872
- Dialling codes: 06349
- Vehicle registration: GER
- Website: www.steinweiler.eu

Steinweiler is a municipality in the district of Germersheim, in Rhineland-Palatinate, Germany.

== History ==
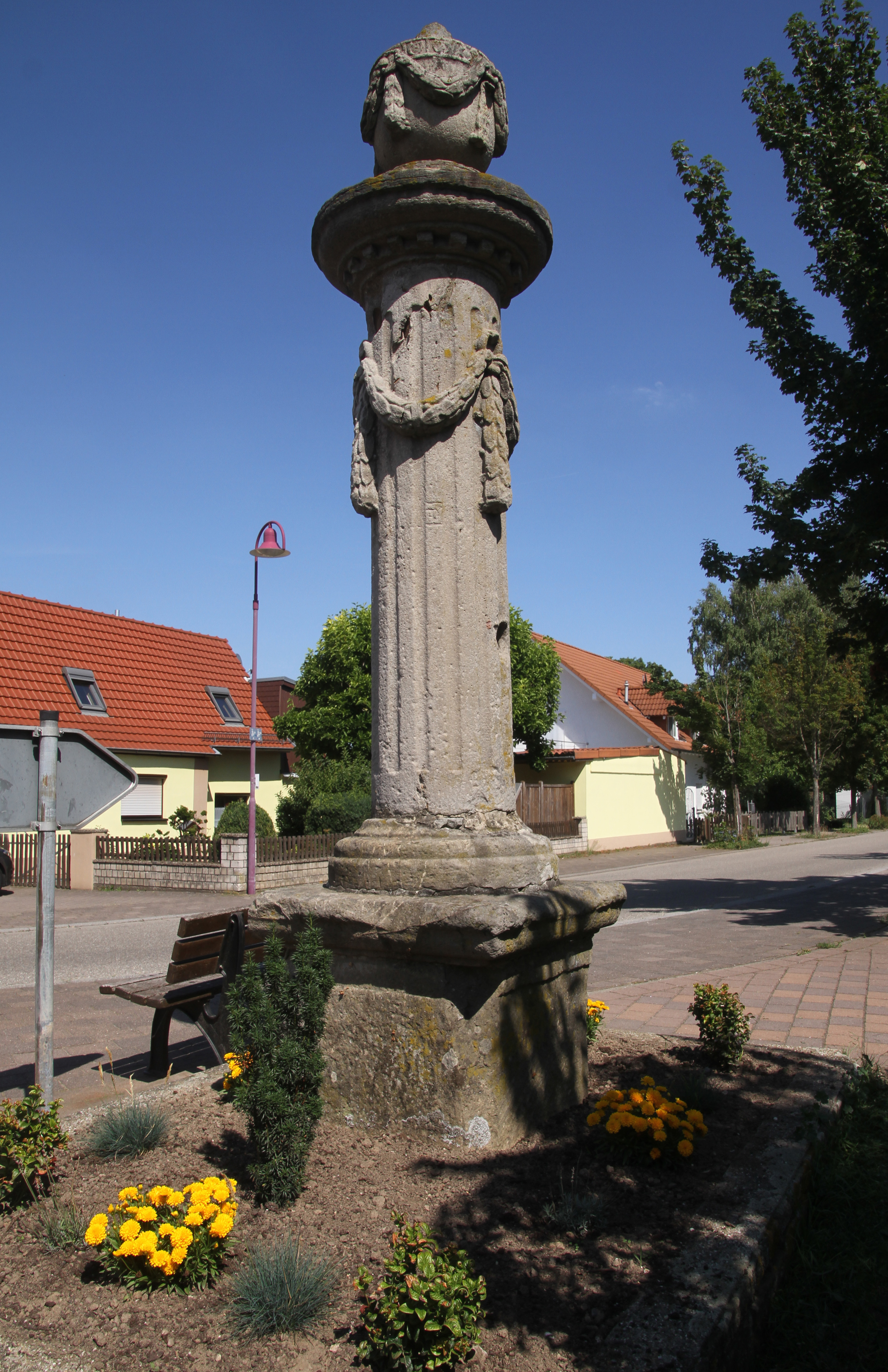
Napoleon's Column

Steinweiler was first created in 968 and was officially given the name "Steinweiler" in 1585. The oldest house in the village dates back to 1724; some others were built in the 1780s and 1790s. There is a column called the "Napoleon's Column" which was erected because Napoleon is said to have walked through this area.

== Economy ==
Steinweiler is surrounded by farms that grow mainly wheat, barley, and corn. It is close to the wine growing region of Germany and hosts a wine festival every year. There is a pig farm in the area. There are just over 1900 people living in Steinweiler.
