= Winden, Germersheim =

Winden
- Municipality
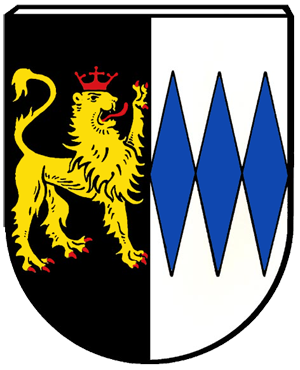
- Coat of arms

- Location of Winden within Germersheim district
- Interactive map of Winden
- Location within Germany Location within Rhineland-Palatinate
- Coordinates: 49°05′58″N 08°06′50″E
- Country: Germany
- State: Rhineland-Palatinate
- District: Germersheim
- Municipal assoc.: Kandel

Government
  - Mayor (2019–24): Peter Beutel

Area
  - Total: 3.21 km^{2} (1.24 sq mi)
- Elevation: 143 m (469 ft)

Population (2025-12-31)
  - Total: 1,032
  - Density: 321/km^{2} (833/sq mi)
- Time zone: UTC+01:00 (CET)
  - Summer (DST): UTC+02:00 (CEST)
- Postal codes: 76872
- Dialling codes: 06349
- Vehicle registration: GER
- Website: vg-kandel.de

Winden (German pronunciation: [ˈvɪndn̩]) is a municipality in the district of Germersheim, in Rhineland-Palatinate, Germany.
