= Erlenbach bei Kandel =

- Municipality
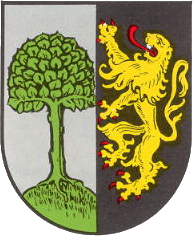
- Coat of arms

- Location of Erlenbach bei Kandel within Germersheim district
- Interactive map of Erlenbach bei Kandel
- Location within Germany Location within Rhineland-Palatinate
- Coordinates: 49°06′38″N 08°11′09″E
- Country: Germany
- State: Rhineland-Palatinate
- District: Germersheim
- Municipal assoc.: Kandel

Government
  - Mayor (2019–24): Maik Wünstel

Area
  - Total: 5.47 km^{2} (2.11 sq mi)
- Elevation: 120 m (390 ft)

Population (2025-12-31)
  - Total: 735
  - Density: 134/km^{2} (348/sq mi)
- Time zone: UTC+01:00 (CET)
  - Summer (DST): UTC+02:00 (CEST)
- Postal codes: 76872
- Dialling codes: 07275
- Vehicle registration: GER
- Website: www.erlenbach-pfalz.de

Erlenbach bei Kandel is a municipality in the district of Germersheim, in Rhineland-Palatinate, Germany.
