= Knittelsheim =

- Municipality
- Flag Coat of arms

- Location of Knittelsheim within Germersheim district
- Interactive map of Knittelsheim
- Location within Germany Location within Rhineland-Palatinate
- Coordinates: 49°11′30″N 08°15′05″E
- Country: Germany
- State: Rhineland-Palatinate
- District: Germersheim
- Municipal assoc.: Bellheim

Government
  - Mayor (2019–24): Ulrich Christmann (CDU)

Area
  - Total: 6.37 km^{2} (2.46 sq mi)
- Elevation: 121 m (397 ft)

Population (2025-12-31)
  - Total: 1,009
  - Density: 158/km^{2} (410/sq mi)
- Time zone: UTC+01:00 (CET)
  - Summer (DST): UTC+02:00 (CEST)
- Postal codes: 76879
- Dialling codes: 06348
- Vehicle registration: GER
- Website: www.knittelsheim.de

Knittelsheim is a municipality in the district of Germersheim, in Rhineland-Palatinate, Germany.
