= Max Jüttner =

German Nazi SA general (1888–1963)

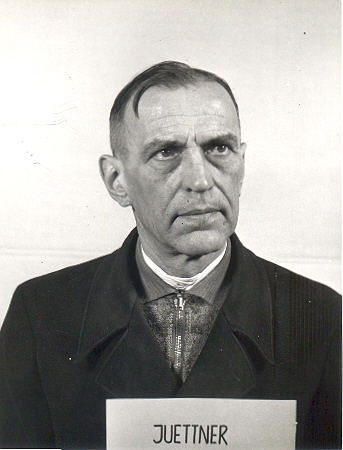
- Jüttner as a witness at the Nuremberg Trials

Stabsführer Sturmabteilung (SA)
- In office 15 June 1939 – 8 May 1945
- Preceded by: Otto Herzog
- Succeeded by: Position abolished
- Stabschef: Viktor Lutze; Wilhelm Schepmann

Chief of the Leadership Office Supreme SA Leadership
- In office 27 July 1934 – 8 May 1945
- Succeeded by: Position abolished

Additional positions
- 1933–1945: Reichstag Deputy

Personal details
- Born: 11 January 1888 Saalfeld, Duchy of Saxe-Meiningen, German Empire
- Died: 14 August 1963 (aged 75) Munich, Bavaria, West Germany
- Party: Nazi Party
- Other political affiliations: German National People's Party; Der Stahlhelm
- Spouse: Erna Nies (m. 1913)
- Children: 3
- Education: University of Halle; University of Jena
- Profession: Military officer
- Civilian awards: Golden Party Badge

Military service
- Allegiance: German Empire; Nazi Germany
- Branch/service: Imperial German Army; Volkssturm
- Years of service: 1914–1919; 1944–1945
- Rank: Hauptmann
- Unit: 55th (2nd Thuringian) Field Artillery Regiment
- Commands: Kampfgruppe "Jüttner"
- Battles/wars: World War I Silesian Uprisings; World War II
- Military awards: Iron Cross, 1st and 2nd class Military Merit Order (Bavaria); Hanseatic Cross (Hamburg); Wound Badge

Max Paul Wilhelm Werner Jüttner (11 January 1888 – 14 August 1963) was a German military officer and an SA-Obergruppenführer in the Sturmabteilung (SA), the Nazi Party's paramilitary organization. He served from 1934 to 1945 as head of the leadership office at the SA Supreme Command, and as the SA-Stabsführer from 1939 to 1945. He also sat as a deputy in the Reichstag of Nazi Germany from 1933 to 1945. Captured after Germany's surrender in the Second World War, he testified at the Nuremberg Trials in defense of the SA.

== Early life and military career ==
Jüttner was born in Saalfeld in the Duchy of Saxe-Meiningen, the son of a printing company owner. He attended Volksschule and Realgymnasium there, and he obtained his Abitur in 1906. He decided to pursue a military career, joined Field Artillery Regiment 55 (2nd Thuringian) in Naumburg as a Fahnenjunker (officer cadet) and was commissioned a Leutnant on 18 August 1907. He served in the Imperial German Army throughout the First World War, from 1914 to 1918, both in front line service and in staff positions, including as an adjutant in his regiment. He was promoted to Oberleutnant in October 1914 and to Hauptmann in December 1915. Twice wounded in action, and was awarded the Iron Cross, first and second class, the Bavarian Military Merit Order and the Hanseatic Cross (Hamburg). At the end of the war, he was an officer on the German General Staff.

== Freikorps and Der Stahlhelm involvement ==
Following his war service, Jüttner was a leader of a Zeitfreiwilligerverband (temporary volunteer association) in the Landesjäger Freikorps under Generalmajor Georg Ludwig Rudolf Maercker that was active in anti-Bolshevik activities in the region of Halle and Merseburg. Subsequently, his application to remain in the newly-established Reichswehr was rejected. He was discharged from the military on 1 August 1919, and then studied law and economics for five semesters at the University of Halle and the University of Jena between 1919 and 1921. He briefly led a volunteer student group from Jena that fought against Polish insurgents in the third Silesian uprising in May and June 1921. Returning to civilian employment, Jüttner worked in the mining industry, first as a coal miner, and later as a clerk and then a department head at the German Lignite Industry Association and the Anhalt Coalworks in Halle (Saale) until November 1933.

Jüttner joined the German veteran's association, Der Stahlhelm, in September 1919. In 1920, he joined the conservative, nationalist German National People's Party (DNVP) but, in January 1923, he joined the Nazi Party until it was banned as a result of the Beer Hall Putsch that November. On 30 January 1923, he became the local group leader of Der Stahlhelm in Halle (Saale). As a candidate of Der Stahlhelm, he was elected to the provincial parliament of the Province of Saxony from 1926 to 1929.

== Nazi political and SA career ==
After the Nazi seizure of power in early 1933, Jüttner was appointed regional leader of Der Stahlhelm for central Germany on 12 April, and also became the deputy to Theodor Duesterberg, the organization's Deputy Federal Leader. On 1 July 1933, Jüttner was readmitted to the Nazi Party with an effective date retroactive to 1 May (membership number 2,039,331). Due to his early Party membership, he would later be awarded the Golden Party Badge. In the November 1933 parliamentary election, he was elected as a deputy to the Reichstag for electoral constituency 11 (Merseburg) and retained this seat until the fall of the Nazi regime in 1945.

On 1 November 1933, Jüttner formally joined the Sturmabteilung (SA), with the rank of SA-Brigadeführer. He was named a Wehrstahlhelmführer and temporarily was placed in charge of coordinating the incorporation of Der Stahlhelm members into the SA at SA-Obergruppe IV that had jurisdiction over SA units in Saxony and Thuringia. He was then transferred to the Obersten SA-Führung (Supreme SA Leadership, OSAF) in Munich, as a full-time SA leader in December 1933. He took over the leadership of the Training and Organization department, where his management tasks included organizing the massive SA marches at the Nuremberg rallies. Jüttner survived the Night of the Long Knives on 30 June – 1 July 1934, in which many in the SA leadership were murdered, and was appointed head of the SA-Führungsamt (SA Leadership Office) on 27 July 1934.

Jüttner was promoted to SA-Gruppenführer on 20 April 1935 and SA-Obergruppenführer on 9 November 1937. In March 1938, he was made leader of the Deutscher Schützenverband, the umbrella organization for German sport shooting clubs. Under his leadership, it sought to transform civil society into one armed and trained to engage in military conflicts. In October of the same year, Jüttner was made the SA liaison officer to the Sudetendeutsches Freikorps following the Munich Conference. On 15 June 1939, he succeeded Otto Herzog as the SA-Stabsführer and the permanent deputy to SA-Stabschef Viktor Lutze. Following the launch of the Second World War and the conquest of Poland, Jüttner was involved in setting up SA organizations in the territories annexed from the former Polish state. New SA-Gruppe Weichsel was set up in Danzig and SA-Gruppe Warthe in Posen by January 1940. Recruitment took place primarily among the Volksdeutsche, ethnic Germans who had lived in the territories. Growth was rapid, with SA-Gruppe Warthe expanding from 10,000 in March 1940 to over 25,000 by mid-1941.

After Lutze's death in an automobile accident on 2 May 1943, Jüttner temporarily took command of the entire SA as acting SA-Stabschef until SA-Obergruppenführer Wilhelm Schepmann was named as the permanent replacement on 18 August 1943. Jüttner then remained in place as Schepmann's permanent deputy. From November 1944 and continuing for the last six months of the European phase of the war, Jüttner was involved in the development and organization of the Volkssturm, the Nazi Party national militia. In April 1945, he formed and took command of the eponymous Volkssturm Kampfgruppe (combat group) "Jüttner" in Munich.

== Post-war life ==
Munich fell to the American forces on 30 April 1945 and, after Germany's surrender, Jüttner was captured by the Americans on 11 May 1945 near Lake Schliersee in the Bavarian Alps. In the following years, he was held as a prisoner of war at numerous camps in Germany. As the highest-ranking SA officer in the hands of the Allies in 1946 – SA-Stabschef Schepmann had gone into hiding and was still missing – Jüttner took part in the Nuremberg trials. Between 13 August and 16 August 1946, he testified as a defense witness on behalf of the SA. It had been indicted as a criminal organization, along with the SS, the High Command of the Wehrmacht, the Nazi Party leadership and the Reich Government. Jüttner alleged in his testimony that the SA had not engaged in criminal activities, did not exert any influence on politics, did not engage in violence against Jews and was not in favor of the war. The court's verdict found the SA not to be a criminal organization within the meaning of the court's charter.

After his release from internment, Jüttner returned to work as an employee in the mining industry. In 1957, he worked as a sales representative and lived in Munich-Solln. In May 1957, he testified as a witness in the trial of former SS-Oberst-Gruppenführer Sepp Dietrich, who was charged in connection with the 1934 Night of the Long Knives murders. Jüttner died in Munich in August 1963.

== Family ==
Jüttner was married in 1913 and had one son and two daughters. His son, Klaus, was killed at the Battle of Stalingrad, and both of his sons-in-law also were killed during the war.

== Sources ==
- Campbell, Bruce (1998). The SA Generals and the Rise of Nazism. Lexington: University Press of Kentucky. ISBN 978-0-813-12047-8.
- Klee, Ernst: Das Personenlexikon zum Dritten Reich. Wer war was vor und nach 1945, Fischer-Taschenbuch-Verlag, Frankfurt-am-Main, 2007, p. 291. ISBN 978-3-596-16048-8.
- Longerich, Peter: The Brown Battalions. History of the SA. C. H. Beck, Munich 1989. ISBN 3-406-33624-8.
- Miller, Michael D.; Schulz, Andreas (2015). Leaders of the Storm Troops. Vol. 1. Solihull, England: Helion & Company. ISBN 978-1-909-98287-1.
- Siemens, Daniel (2017). Stormtroopers: A New History of Hitler's Brownshirts. New Haven: Yale University Press. ISBN 978-0-300-19681-8.
- Stockhorst, Erich: 5000 Köpfe: Wer War Was im 3. Reich, Arndt, 1985. p. 221. ISBN 978-3-887-41116-9.
