= Weingarten, Rhineland-Palatinate =

Weingarten
- Municipality
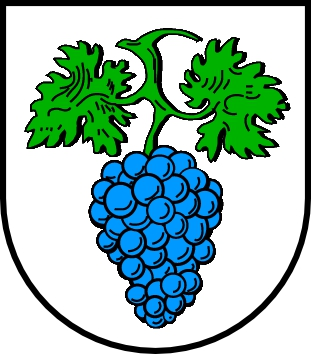
- Coat of arms

- Location of Weingarten within Germersheim district
- Interactive map of Weingarten
- Location within Germany Location within Rhineland-Palatinate
- Coordinates: 49°15′34″N 08°17′12″E
- Country: Germany
- State: Rhineland-Palatinate
- District: Germersheim
- Municipal assoc.: Lingenfeld

Government
  - Mayor (2019–24): Stefan Becker (CDU)

Area
  - Total: 6.67 km^{2} (2.58 sq mi)
- Elevation: 123 m (404 ft)

Population (2025-12-31)
  - Total: 1,859
  - Density: 279/km^{2} (722/sq mi)
- Time zone: UTC+01:00 (CET)
  - Summer (DST): UTC+02:00 (CEST)
- Postal codes: 67366
- Dialling codes: 06344
- Vehicle registration: GER
- Website: weingarten-pfalz.de

Weingarten (German pronunciation: [ˈvaɪnɡaʁtn̩]) is a municipality in the district of Germersheim, in Rhineland-Palatinate, Germany.

== Geography ==
Weingarten lies 12 km west of Germersheim, about 16 km northeast of Landau, and about 13 km southwest of Speyer.

== History ==
Weingarten is one of the oldest settlements in Vorderpfalz (the eastern part of Pfalz that lies in the Rhine valley). It is mentioned in the records of Lorsch in 771. The nobles of Weingarten lived in the Schloßberg starting in 1226. It was destroyed in 1525. In 1536, Weingarten became Protestant, and the present Lutheran church dates from the first half of the 16th century. The west tower is somewhat older.

Archaeological findings date occupation of the site to the Bronze Age, with Roman remnants, as well.

== Economy ==
As its name implies, this is a wine-making area with extensive vineyards. Weingarten lies near the Deutsche Weinstraße, a well-known tourist route through the Pfalz vineyards and the Pfalzer Wald.

== Twin towns ==
- Vieillevigne, France
