= Freisbach =

- Municipality
- Coat of arms

- Location of Freisbach within Germersheim district
- Interactive map of Freisbach
- Location within Germany Location within Rhineland-Palatinate
- Coordinates: 49°16′18″N 08°16′18″E
- Country: Germany
- State: Rhineland-Palatinate
- District: Germersheim
- Municipal assoc.: Lingenfeld

Government
  - Mayor (2019–24): Peter Gauweiler

Area
  - Total: 4.98 km^{2} (1.92 sq mi)
- Elevation: 115 m (377 ft)

Population (2025-12-31)
  - Total: 1,190
  - Density: 239/km^{2} (619/sq mi)
- Time zone: UTC+01:00 (CET)
  - Summer (DST): UTC+02:00 (CEST)
- Postal codes: 67361
- Dialling codes: 06344
- Vehicle registration: GER
- Website: www.freisbach.de

Freisbach is a municipality in the district of Germersheim, in Rhineland-Palatinate, Germany.
