= Jockgrim (Verbandsgemeinde) =

- Verbandsgemeinde
- Location of Jockgrim within Germersheim district
- Interactive map of Jockgrim
- Location within Germany Location within Rhineland-Palatinate
- Coordinates: 49°06′N 8°17′E
- Country: Germany
- State: Rhineland-Palatinate
- District: Germersheim
- Seat: Jockgrim
- Subdivisions: 4 municipalities

Area
  - Total: 40.94 km^{2} (15.81 sq mi)

Population (2025-12-31)
  - Total: 17,225
  - Density: 420.7/km^{2} (1,090/sq mi)
- Time zone: UTC+01:00 (CET)
  - Summer (DST): UTC+02:00 (CEST)
- Website: www.vg-jockgrim.de

Jockgrim is a Verbandsgemeinde ("collective municipality") in the district of Germersheim, Rhineland-Palatinate, Germany. The seat of the Verbandsgemeinde is in Jockgrim.

The Verbandsgemeinde Jockgrim consists of the following Ortsgemeinden ("local municipalities"):

1. Hatzenbühl
2. Jockgrim
3. Neupotz
4. Rheinzabern
