= Jockgrim =

- Municipality
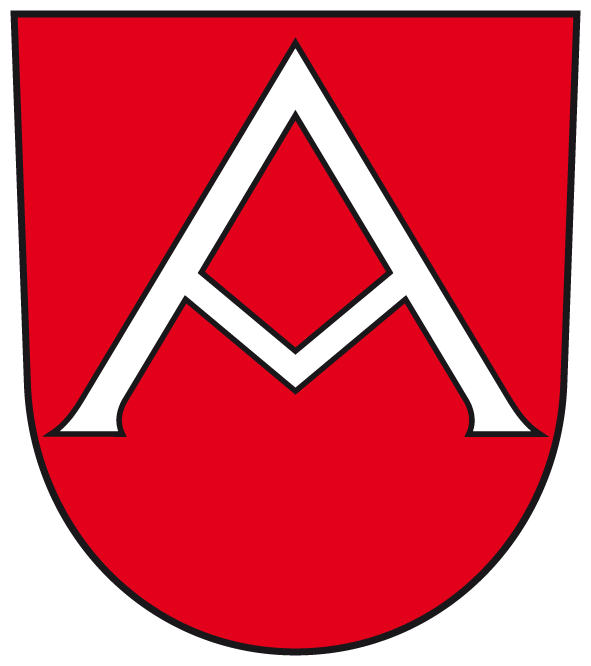
- Coat of arms

- Location of Jockgrim within Germersheim district
- Interactive map of Jockgrim
- Location within Germany Location within Rhineland-Palatinate
- Coordinates: 49°5′42″N 08°16′42″E
- Country: Germany
- State: Rhineland-Palatinate
- District: Germersheim
- Municipal assoc.: Jockgrim

Government
  - Mayor (2019–24): Sabine Baumann (CDU)

Area
  - Total: 12.61 km^{2} (4.87 sq mi)
- Elevation: 114 m (374 ft)

Population (2025-12-31)
  - Total: 7,484
  - Density: 593.5/km^{2} (1,537/sq mi)
- Time zone: UTC+01:00 (CET)
  - Summer (DST): UTC+02:00 (CEST)
- Postal codes: 76751
- Dialling codes: 07271
- Vehicle registration: GER
- Website: www.jockgrim.de

Jockgrim (German pronunciation: [ˈjɔkˌɡʁɪm]) is a municipality in the district of Germersheim, in Rhineland-Palatinate, Germany. It is situated on the left bank of the Rhine, approximately 15 km north-west of Karlsruhe.

Jockgrim is the seat of the Verbandsgemeinde ("collective municipality") Jockgrim. Jockgrim station is on Schifferstadt–Wörth railway and is served by the Karlsruhe Stadtbahn.

In 1965, Jockgrim celebrated the 700th anniversary of the old part of town: Hinterstadtl. This picturesque area has a bi-annual festival called Hinterstadtl Fest which takes place on the first weekend of September. In 2015 they were celebrating the 750th anniversary.

== Facts ==
Jockgrim had a little scene in the movie "Buffalo Soldiers". The scene when a tank runs over a gas station was filmed in Jockgrim, in the background is the Hinterstädel.

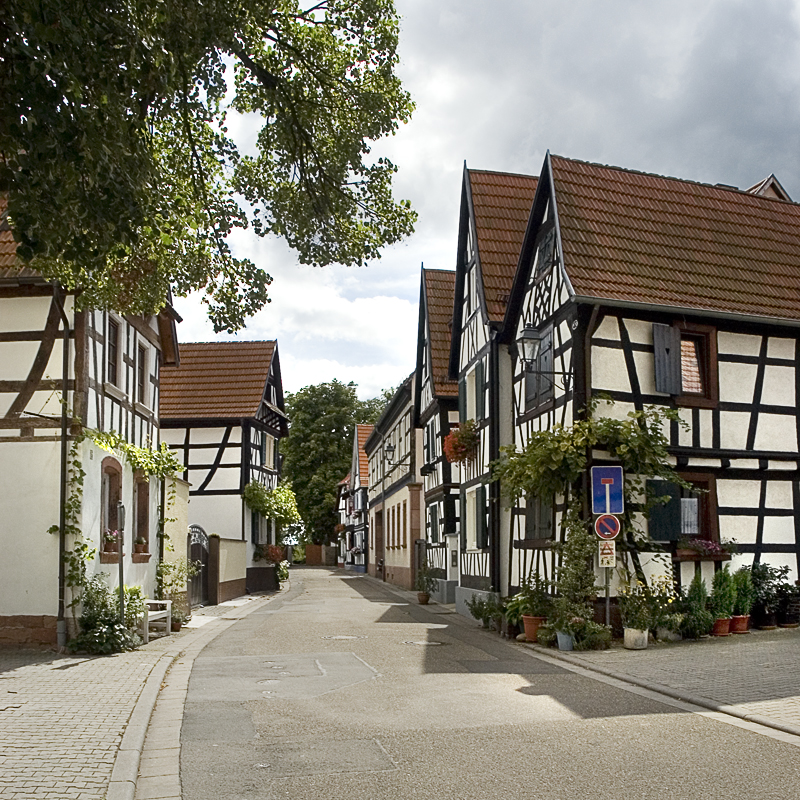
„Hinnerstädel“, Ludwig street

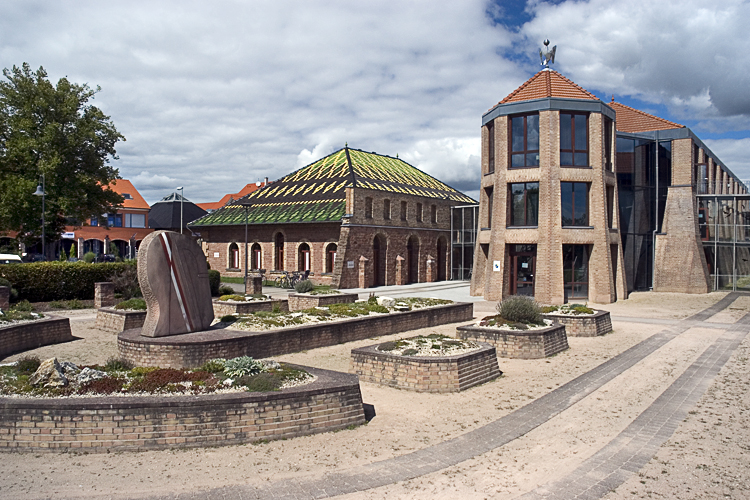
Ziegeleimuseum (Brickyard museum)

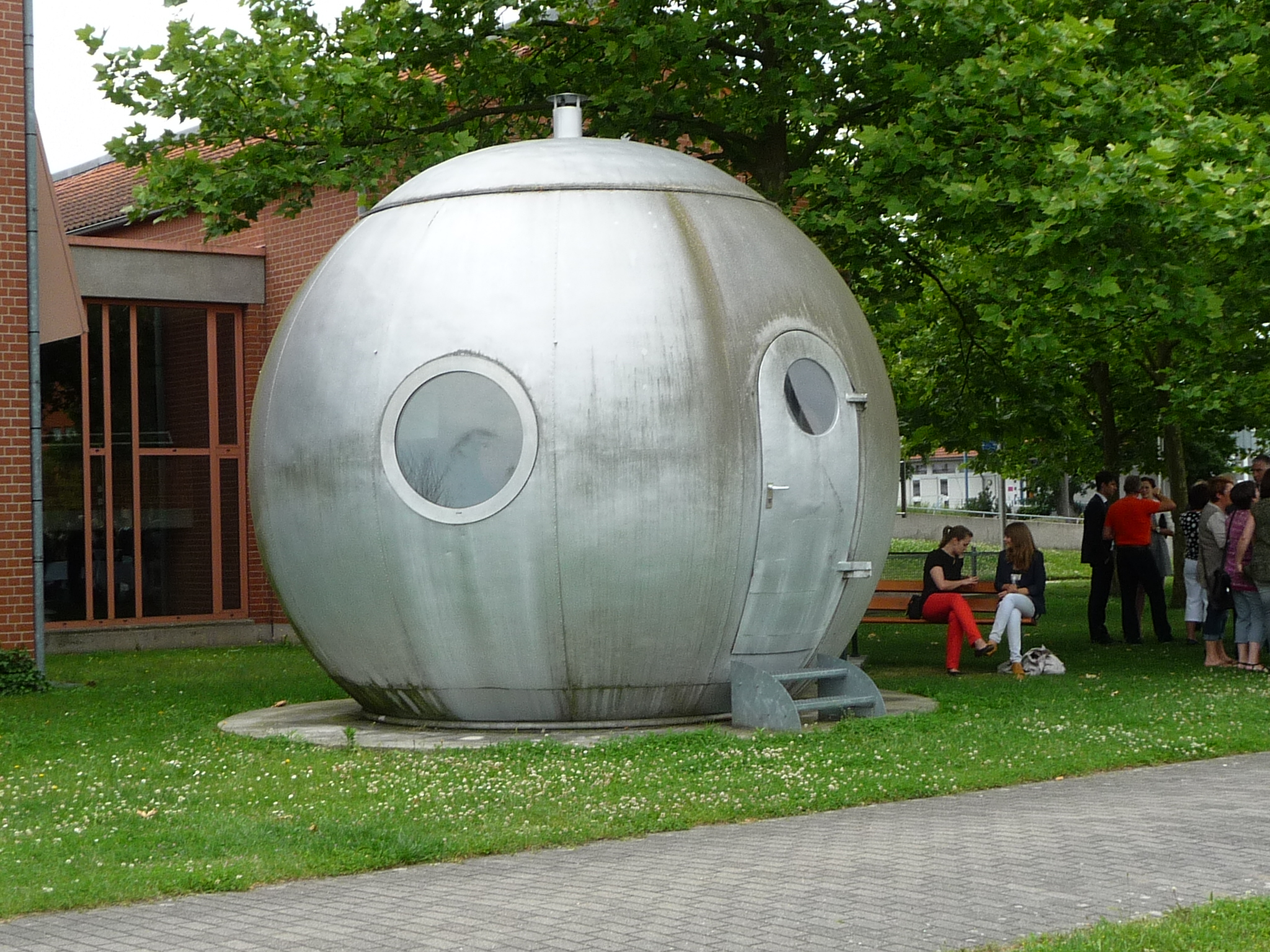
Kugelhaus (Globe house)

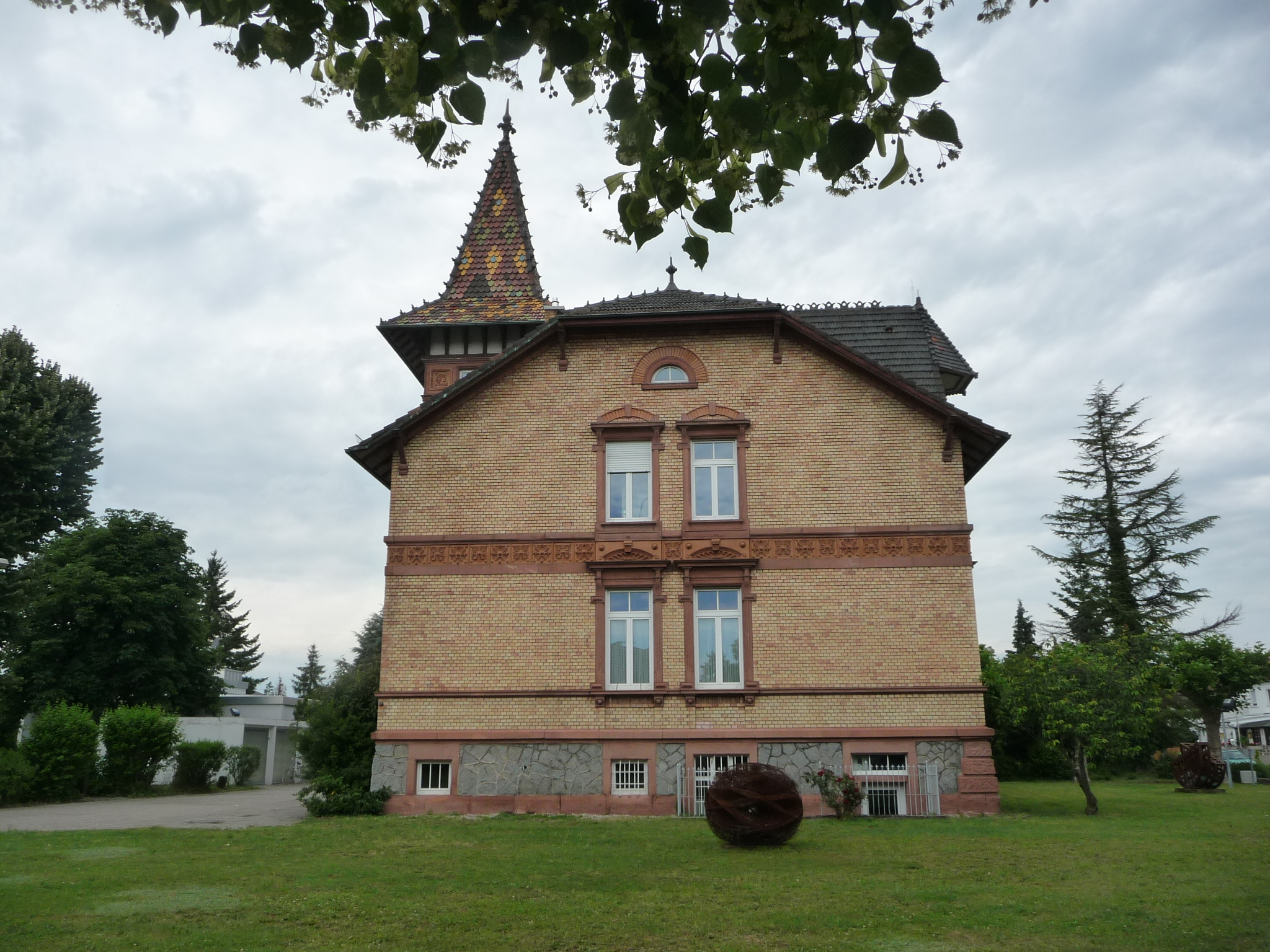
Jockgrim Town hall

== People who have worked on the ground ==
- Franz Bernhard (1934–2013), sculptor, lived in Jockgrim
- Albert Haueisen (1872–1954), painter
- Helmut Rußwurm (1911–1995), painter
