= Hatzenbühl =

- Municipality
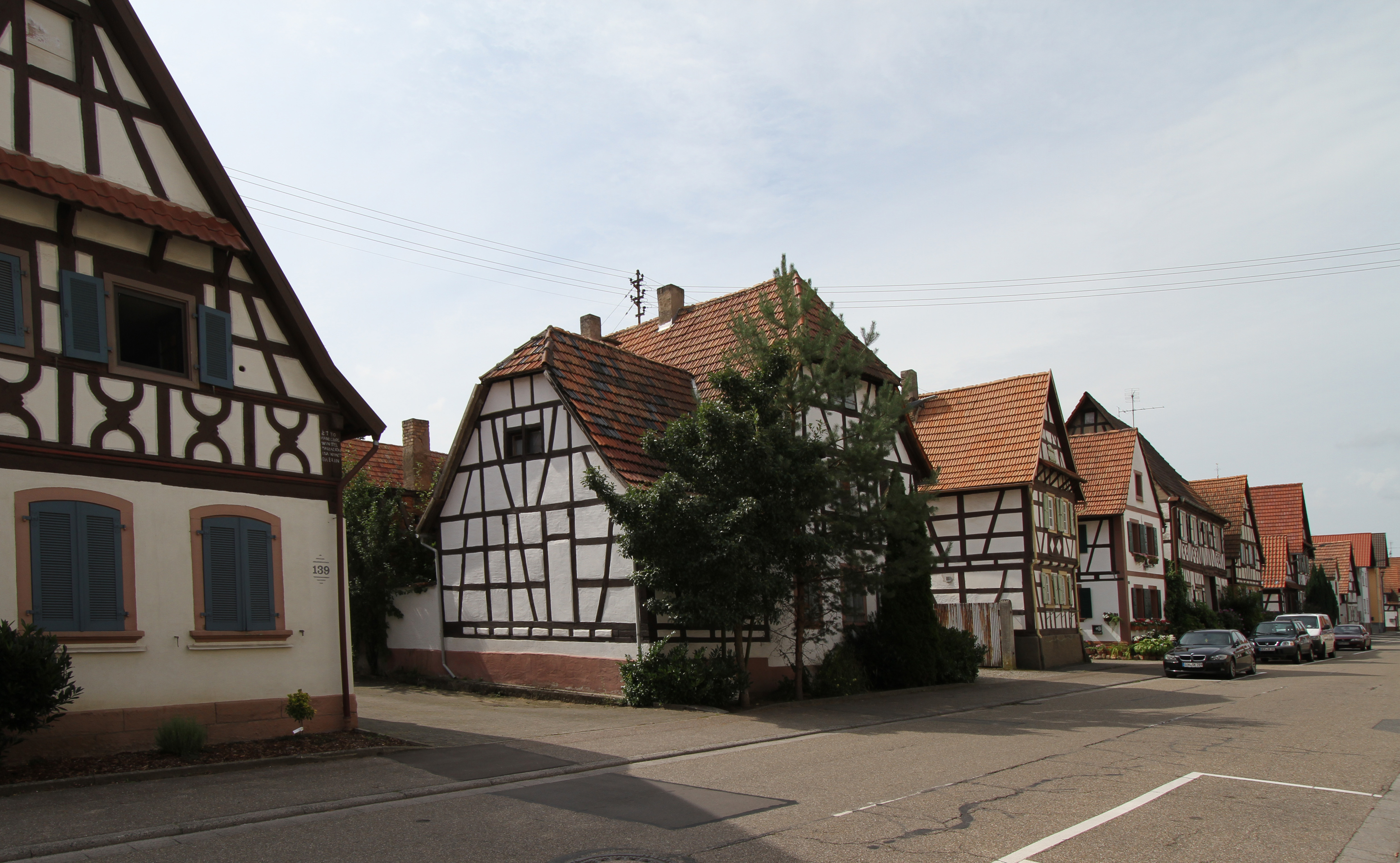

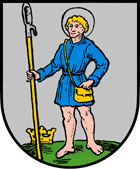
- Coat of arms

- Location of Hatzenbühl within Germersheim district
- Interactive map of Hatzenbühl
- Location within Germany Location within Rhineland-Palatinate
- Coordinates: 49°06′37″N 08°14′37″E
- Country: Germany
- State: Rhineland-Palatinate
- District: Germersheim
- Municipal assoc.: Jockgrim

Government
  - Mayor (2019–24): Karlheinz Henigin (CDU)

Area
  - Total: 7.76 km^{2} (3.00 sq mi)
- Elevation: 114 m (374 ft)

Population (2025-12-31)
  - Total: 2,847
  - Density: 367/km^{2} (950/sq mi)
- Time zone: UTC+01:00 (CET)
  - Summer (DST): UTC+02:00 (CEST)
- Postal codes: 76770
- Dialling codes: 07275
- Vehicle registration: GER
- Website: www.hatzenbuehl.de

Hatzenbühl is a municipality in the district of Germersheim, in Rhineland-Palatinate, Germany.

== Timbered houses in Hatzenbühl ==
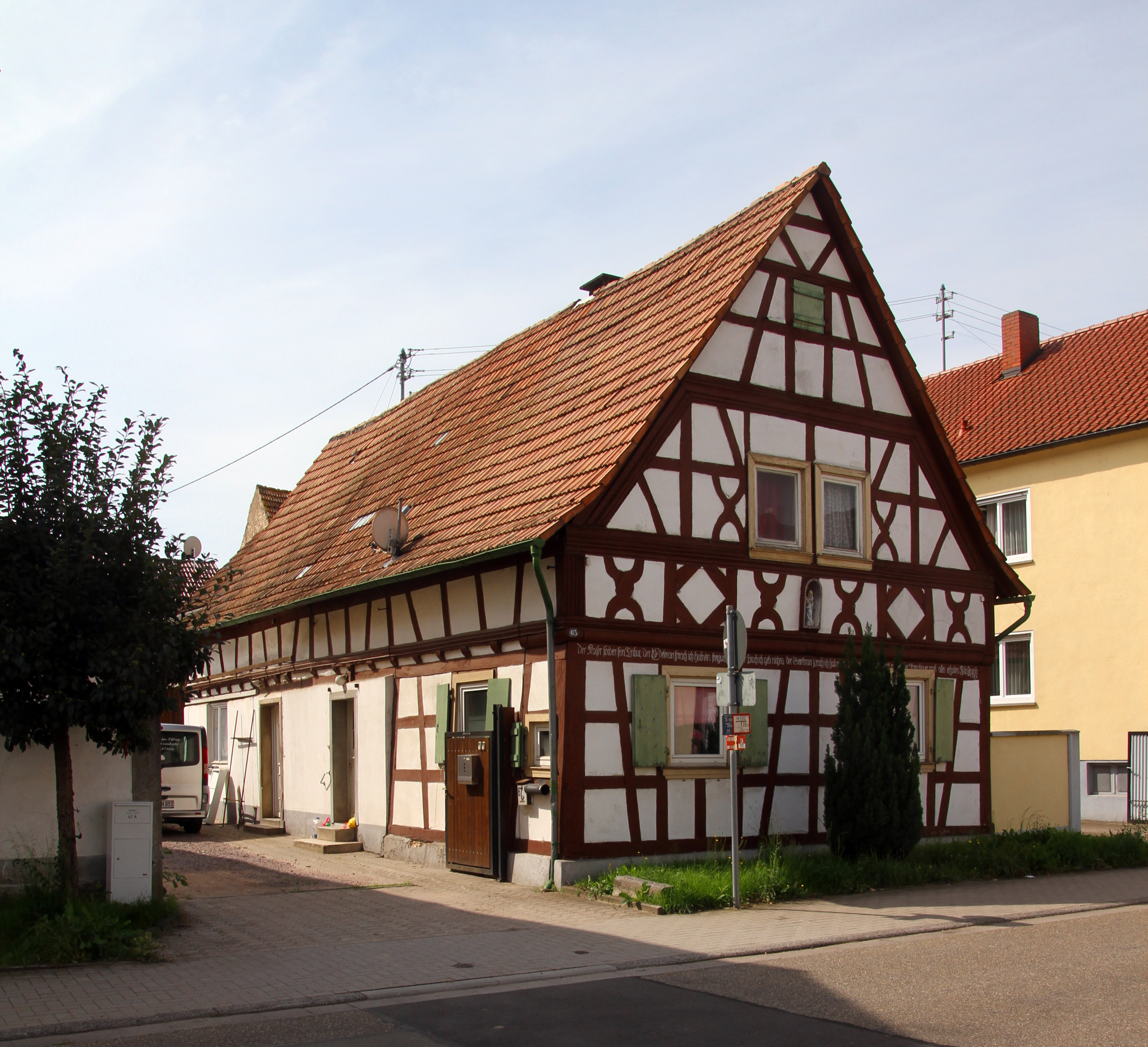
65, Luitpoldstr

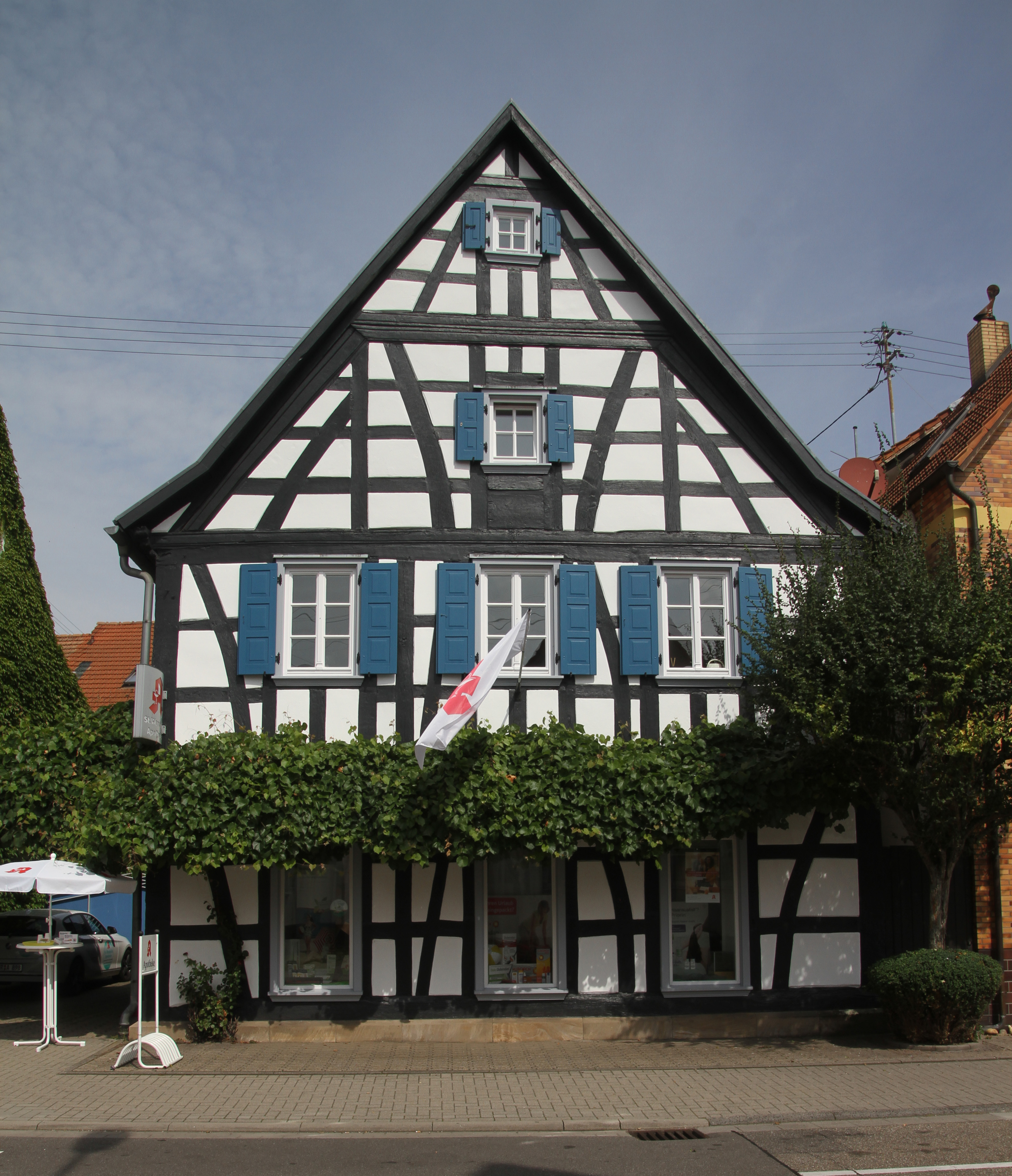
98, Luitpoldstr

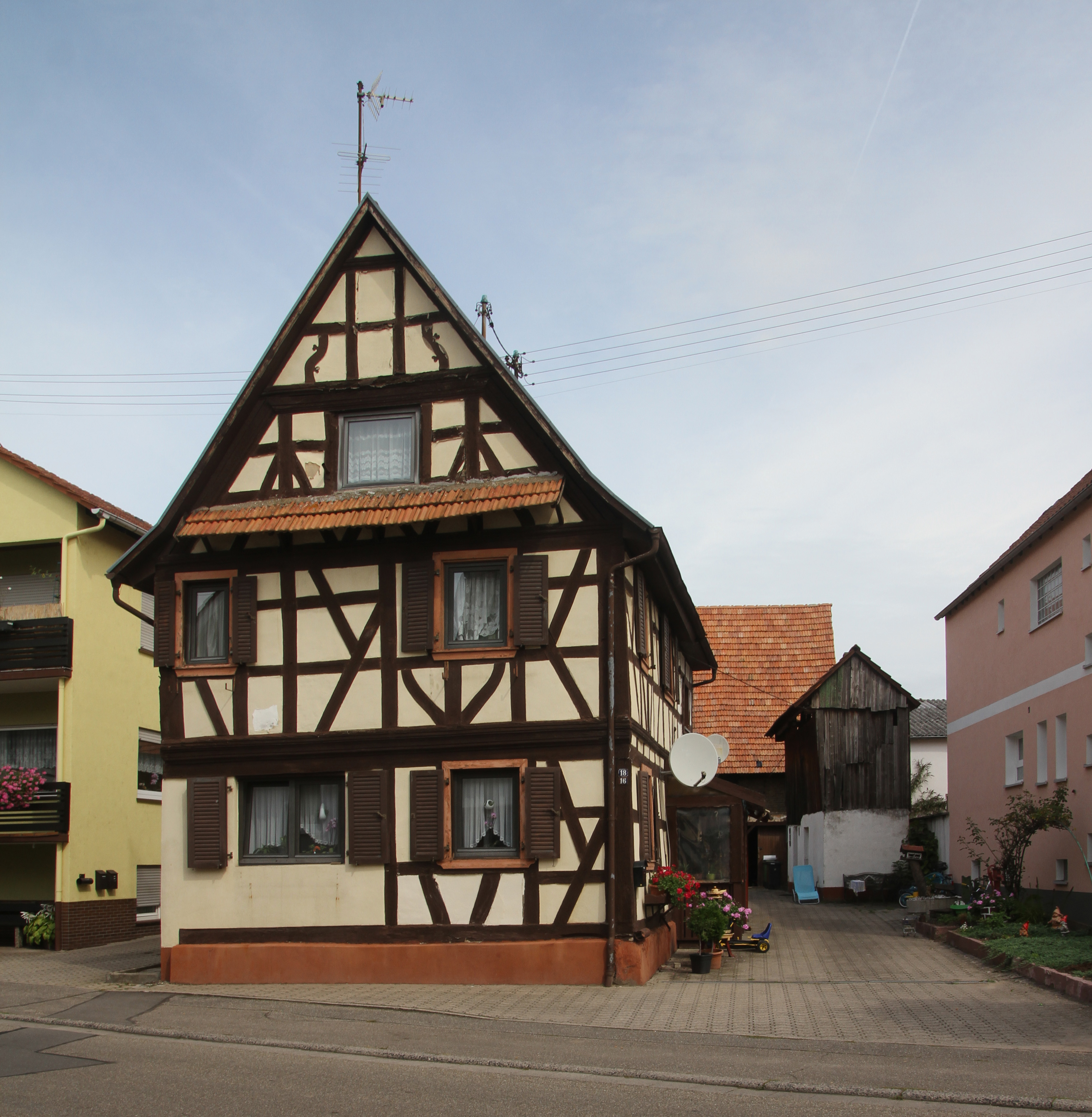
18, Luitpoldstr

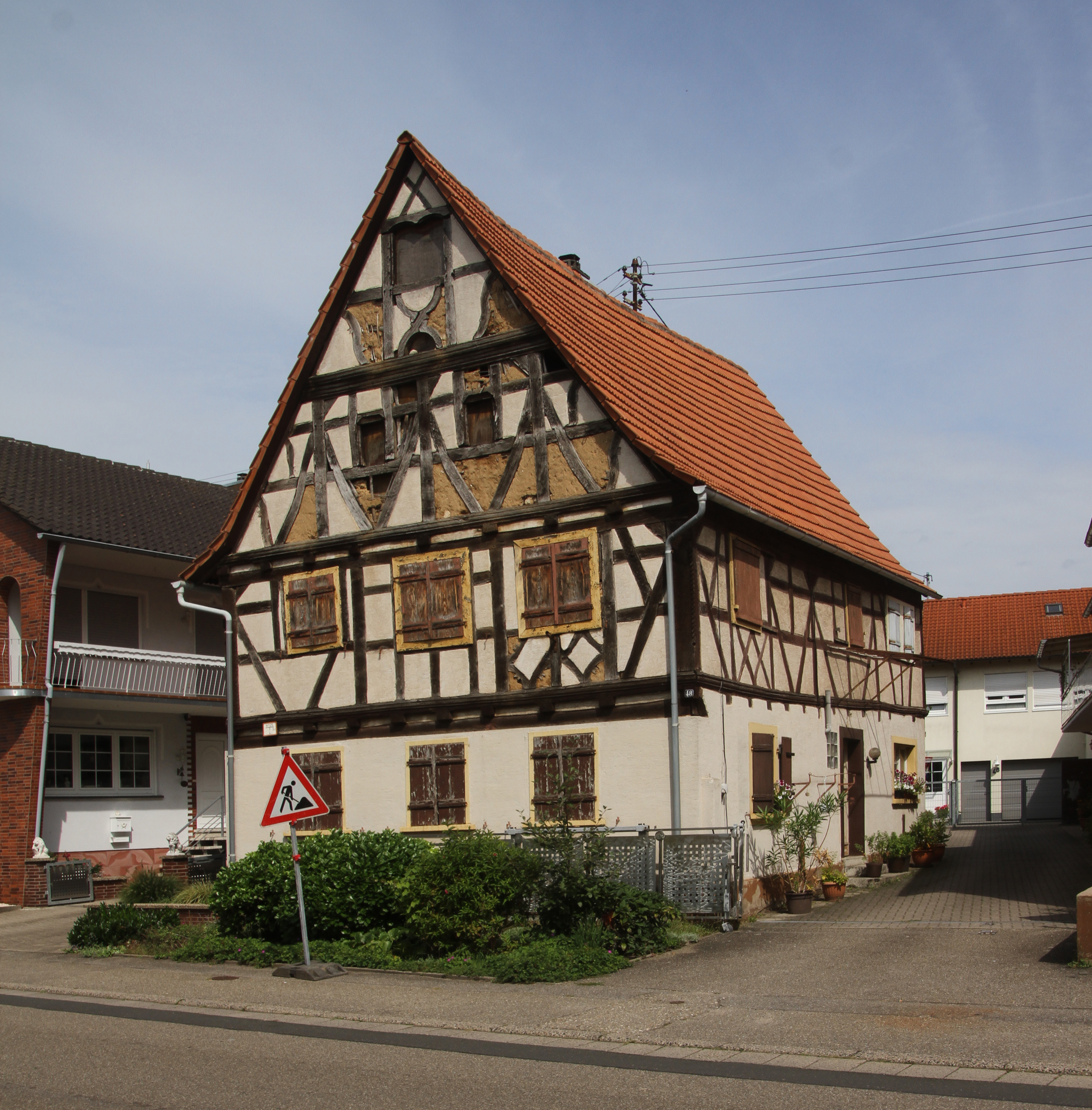
48, Luitpoldstr
