= Lingenfeld (Verbandsgemeinde) =

- Verbandsgemeinde
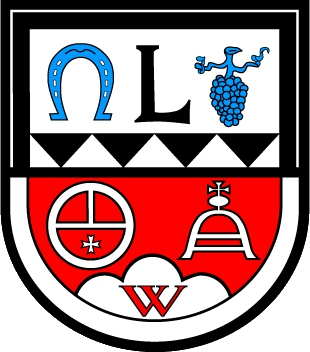
- Coat of arms

- Location of Lingenfeld within Landkreis Germersheim district
- Interactive map of Lingenfeld
- Location within Germany Location within Rhineland-Palatinate
- Coordinates: 49.245°N 8.344°E
- Country: Germany
- State: Rhineland-Palatinate
- District: Landkreis Germersheim
- Seat: Lingenfeld

Area
  - Total: 69.81 km^{2} (26.95 sq mi)

Population (2025-12-31)
  - Total: 17,270
  - Density: 247.4/km^{2} (640.7/sq mi)
- Time zone: UTC+01:00 (CET)
  - Summer (DST): UTC+02:00 (CEST)
- Vehicle registration: GER
- Website: www.vg-lingenfeld.de

Lingenfeld is a Verbandsgemeinde ("collective municipality") in the district of Germersheim, Rhineland-Palatinate, Germany. The seat of the Verbandsgemeinde is in Lingenfeld.

The Verbandsgemeinde Lingenfeld consists of the following Ortsgemeinden ("local municipalities"):

Verbandsgemeinde; Lingenfeld		16 762 inhabitants	69.81 km²
	Freisbach	1 139 inhabitants	4.98 km²
	Lingenfeld *	5 841 inhabitants	15.26 km²
	Lustadt	3 305 inhabitants	23.51 km²
	Schwegenheim	2 968 inhabitants	12.27 km²
	Weingarten	1 767 inhabitants	6.67 km²
	Westheim	1 742 inhabitants	7.12 km²

^{*}seat of the Verbandsgemeinde
