= Kandel (Verbandsgemeinde) =

Verbandsgemeinde in Germersheim, Germany

- Verbandsgemeinde
- Location of Kandel within Germersheim district
- Interactive map of Kandel
- Location within Germany Location within Rhineland-Palatinate
- Coordinates: 49°05′30″N 8°09′30″E
- Country: Germany
- State: Rhineland-Palatinate
- District: Germersheim
- Seat: Kandel
- Subdivisions: 7 municipalities

Area
  - Total: 68.98 km^{2} (26.63 sq mi)

Population (2025-12-31)
  - Total: 16,543
  - Density: 239.8/km^{2} (621.1/sq mi)
- Time zone: UTC+01:00 (CET)
  - Summer (DST): UTC+02:00 (CEST)
- Website: www.vg-kandel.de

Kandel is a Verbandsgemeinde ("collective municipality") in the district of Germersheim, Rhineland-Palatinate, Germany. The seat of the Verbandsgemeinde is in the town of Kandel.

The Verbandsgemeinde consists of the following Ortsgemeinden ("local municipalities"):

1. Erlenbach bei Kandel
2. Freckenfeld
3. Kandel
4. Minfeld
5. Steinweiler
6. Vollmersweiler
7. Winden
