= Manuel Hornig =

German footballer

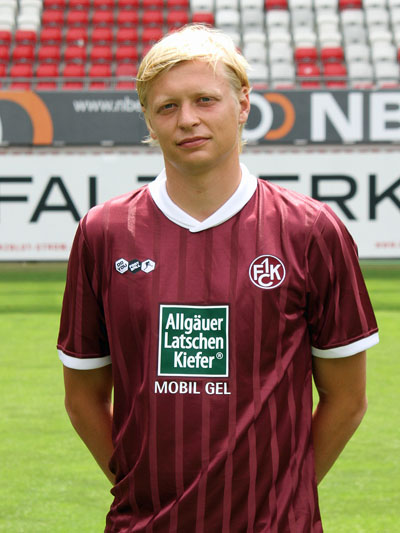
- Hornig in 2010

Personal information
- Date of birth: 18 December 1982 (age 43)
- Place of birth: Kandel, West Germany
- Height: 1.90 m (6 ft 3 in)
- Position: Defender

Youth career
- SV Olympia Rheinzabern
- –2000: Karlsruher SC II

Senior career*
Years	Team	Apps	(Gls)
2000–2005	SC Hauenstein		
2005–2006	1. FC Saarbrücken II	9	(3)
2006–2007	1. FC Saarbrücken	23	(1)
2007–2008	Kickers Offenbach	6	(1)
2008–2010	1. FC Kaiserslautern	20	(2)
2010–2011	TuS Koblenz	21	(3)
2011–2017	Arminia Bielefeld	97	(7)
- * Club domestic league appearances and goals

Manuel Hornig (born 18 December 1982 in Kandel) is a German former professional footballer who played as a defender.
