= Bellheim (Verbandsgemeinde) =

- Verbandsgemeinde
- Location of Bellheim within Germersheim district
- Interactive map of Bellheim
- Location within Germany Location within Rhineland-Palatinate
- Coordinates: 49°12′N 8°17′E
- Country: Germany
- State: Rhineland-Palatinate
- District: Germersheim
- Seat: Bellheim
- Subdivisions: 4 municipalities

Area
  - Total: 43.54 km^{2} (16.81 sq mi)

Population (2025-12-31)
  - Total: 13,772
  - Density: 316.3/km^{2} (819.2/sq mi)
- Time zone: UTC+01:00 (CET)
  - Summer (DST): UTC+02:00 (CEST)
- Website: www.bellheim.de

Bellheim is a Verbandsgemeinde ("collective municipality") in the district of Germersheim, Rhineland-Palatinate, Germany. The seat of the Verbandsgemeinde is in Bellheim.

The Verbandsgemeinde Bellheim consists of the following Ortsgemeinden ("local municipalities"):

1. Bellheim
2. Knittelsheim
3. Ottersheim bei Landau
4. Zeiskam
