= Bellheim =

- Municipality
- Flag Coat of arms

- Location of Bellheim within Germersheim district
- Interactive map of Bellheim
- Location within Germany Location within Rhineland-Palatinate
- Coordinates: 49°11′53″N 08°16′45″E
- Country: Germany
- State: Rhineland-Palatinate
- District: Germersheim
- Municipal assoc.: Bellheim

Government
  - Mayor (2019–24): Paul Gärtner

Area
  - Total: 20.44 km^{2} (7.89 sq mi)
- Elevation: 113 m (371 ft)

Population (2025-12-31)
  - Total: 8,715
  - Density: 426.4/km^{2} (1,104/sq mi)
- Time zone: UTC+01:00 (CET)
  - Summer (DST): UTC+02:00 (CEST)
- Postal codes: 76756
- Dialling codes: 07272
- Vehicle registration: GER
- Website: www.bellheim.de

Bellheim is a municipality in the district of Germersheim in the German state of Rhineland-Palatinate. It is situated west of the Rhine, approximately 13 kilometres (8 mi) east of Landau and 15 km (9 mi) northwest of the city of Karlsruhe. It is home to the Bellheimer Brauerei (part of Park & Bellheimer AG), a brewery that produces the Bellheimer Lord, Bellheimer Silberpils, and Bellheimer Naturtrüb beers and Bellaris mineral waters. Bellheim is the seat of the Verbandsgemeinde ("collective municipality") Bellheim. Bellheim station is on Schifferstadt–Wörth railway and is served by the Karlsruhe Stadtbahn.

== Current and former residents ==
- Anton Spiehler (1795-1867), Catholic bishop secretary, spiritual council and cathedral capitular of the Diocese of Speyer
- Michael Bayersdörfer (1867-1940), politician and Reichstag deputy (BVP) 1924-1933
- Manfred Kramer (born 1939), politician (CDU), member of the Landtag of Rhineland-Palatinate 1981-2003
- Richard Bolz (born 1947), former General of the German Army Aviation Corps
- Georg Gawliczek, (1919-1999), 1955/56 football trainer of Phönix Bellheim
- Andy Becht (born 1974), jurist and politician (FDP), lives in Bellheim
- Yemisi Ogunleye (born 1998), Olympic champion shot putter
