= Neupotz =

- Municipality
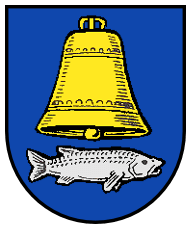
- Coat of arms

- Location of Neupotz within Germersheim district
- Interactive map of Neupotz
- Location within Germany Location within Rhineland-Palatinate
- Coordinates: 49°07′04″N 08°19′09″E
- Country: Germany
- State: Rhineland-Palatinate
- District: Germersheim
- Municipal assoc.: Jockgrim

Government
  - Mayor (2019–24): Roland Bellaire (CDU)

Area
  - Total: 7.78 km^{2} (3.00 sq mi)
- Elevation: 99 m (325 ft)

Population (2025-12-31)
  - Total: 1,936
  - Density: 249/km^{2} (645/sq mi)
- Time zone: UTC+01:00 (CET)
  - Summer (DST): UTC+02:00 (CEST)
- Postal codes: 76777
- Dialling codes: 07272
- Vehicle registration: GER
- Website: www.neupotz.de

Neupotz is a municipality in the district of Germersheim, in Rhineland-Palatinate, Germany.
