= Freckenfeld =

- Municipality
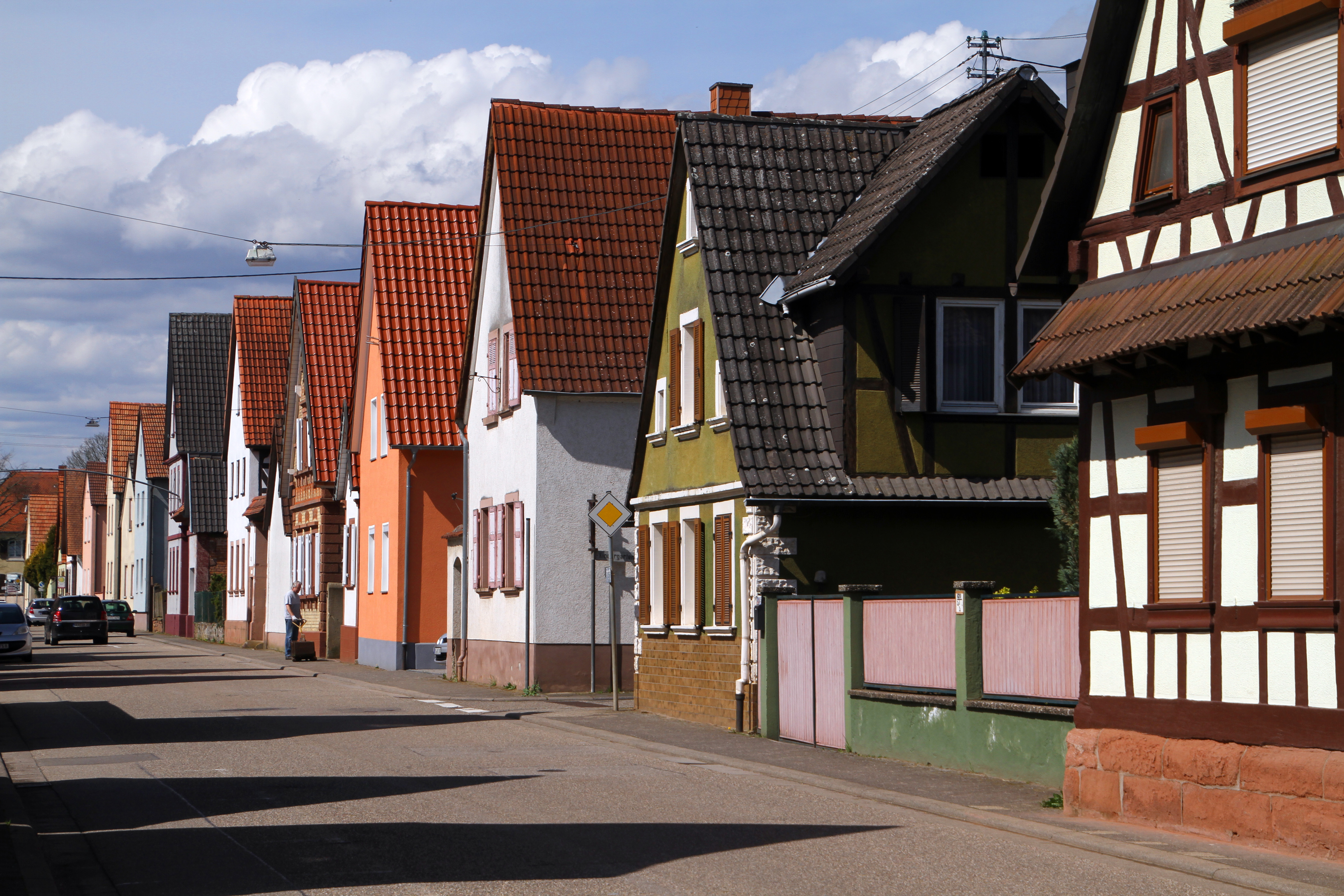

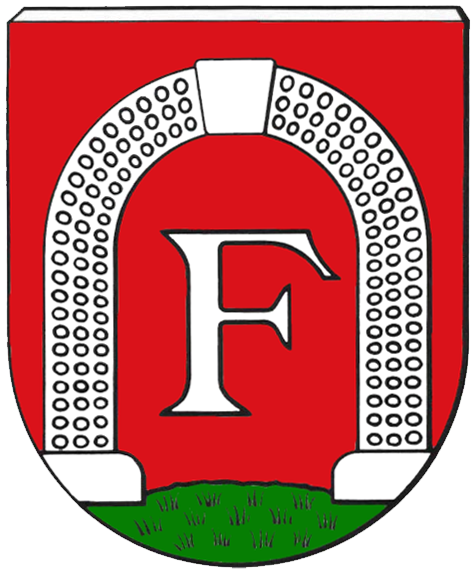
- Coat of arms

- Location of Freckenfeld within Germersheim district
- Interactive map of Freckenfeld
- Location within Germany Location within Rhineland-Palatinate
- Coordinates: 49°03′53″N 08°06′50″E
- Country: Germany
- State: Rhineland-Palatinate
- District: Germersheim
- Municipal assoc.: Kandel

Government
  - Mayor (2019–24): Martin Thürwächter (CDU)

Area
  - Total: 11.13 km^{2} (4.30 sq mi)
- Elevation: 127 m (417 ft)

Population (2025-12-31)
  - Total: 1,516
  - Density: 136.2/km^{2} (352.8/sq mi)
- Time zone: UTC+01:00 (CET)
  - Summer (DST): UTC+02:00 (CEST)
- Postal codes: 76872
- Dialling codes: 06340
- Vehicle registration: GER
- Website: www.freckenfeld.de

Freckenfeld is a municipality in the district of Germersheim, in Rhineland-Palatinate, Germany.
