= Germersheim (district) =

Coordinates: 49°05′N 8°15′E

- District
- Flag Coat of arms
- Country: Germany
- State: Rhineland-Palatinate
- Capital: Germersheim

Government
  - District admin.: Martin Brandl (CDU)

Area
  - Total: 463.26 km^{2} (178.87 sq mi)

Population (31 December 2023)
  - Total: 131,492
  - Density: 283.84/km^{2} (735.14/sq mi)
- Time zone: UTC+01:00 (CET)
  - Summer (DST): UTC+02:00 (CEST)
- Vehicle registration: GER
- Website: kreis-germersheim.de

Germersheim (German: [ˈɡɛʁmɐsˌhaɪm]) is a district in the south-east of Rhineland-Palatinate, Germany. Neighboring districts are (from west clockwise) Südliche Weinstraße, Rhein-Pfalz-Kreis, the district Karlsruhe as well as the district-free city of Karlsruhe, and the French département Bas-Rhin.

== History ==
Most of the region was part of the Palatinate from the 11th century on. The bishops of Speyer owned some lands, too. The Palatinate was destroyed in the Napoleonic Wars, and the clerical states of Germany were dissolved in 1803. After a period of French occupation the Congress of Vienna decided to hand the territories over to Bavaria. The region remained a part of Bavaria until World War II; afterwards it was incorporated into the newly established state of Rhineland-Palatinate.

== Geography ==
The Rhine river marks (with a few exceptions) the eastern boundary of the district, the river Lauter most of the southern boundary. The landscape of the district consists of the Rhine valley, in the north and east meeting the jungle-like areas of old Rhine arms, in the south covering the Bienwald, a forest stretching into the north of Alsace.

== Coat of arms ==
The coat of arms shows the Palatine Lion in the top part, and the cross of Speyer in the bottom part. The wavy line in the middle symbolizes the Rhine river, and the escutcheon in the middle is from the coat of arms of the city of Germersheim.

== Towns and municipalities ==
Clickable map of towns and municipalities in the district

Towns	Verbandsgemeinden
1. Germersheim; 2. Wörth am Rhein	1. Bellheim; 1. Bellheim^{1}; 2. Knittelsheim; 3. Ottersheim bei Landau; 4. Zeiskam; 2. Hagenbach; 1. Berg; 2. Hagenbach^{1, 2}; 3. Neuburg am Rhein; 4. Scheibenhardt; 3. Jockgrim; 1. Hatzenbühl; 2. Jockgrim^{1}; 3. Neupotz; 4. Rheinzabern	4. Kandel; 1. Erlenbach bei Kandel; 2. Freckenfeld; 3. Kandel^{1, 2}; 4. Minfeld; 5. Steinweiler; 6. Vollmersweiler; 7. Winden; 5. Lingenfeld; 1. Freisbach; 2. Lingenfeld^{1}; 3. Lustadt; 4. Schwegenheim; 5. Weingarten; 6. Westheim; 6. Rülzheim; 1. Hördt; 2. Kuhardt; 3. Leimersheim; 4. Rülzheim^{1}
	^{1}seat of the Verbandsgemeinde; ^{2}town
