= Westheim, Rhineland-Palatinate =

Westheim
- Municipality
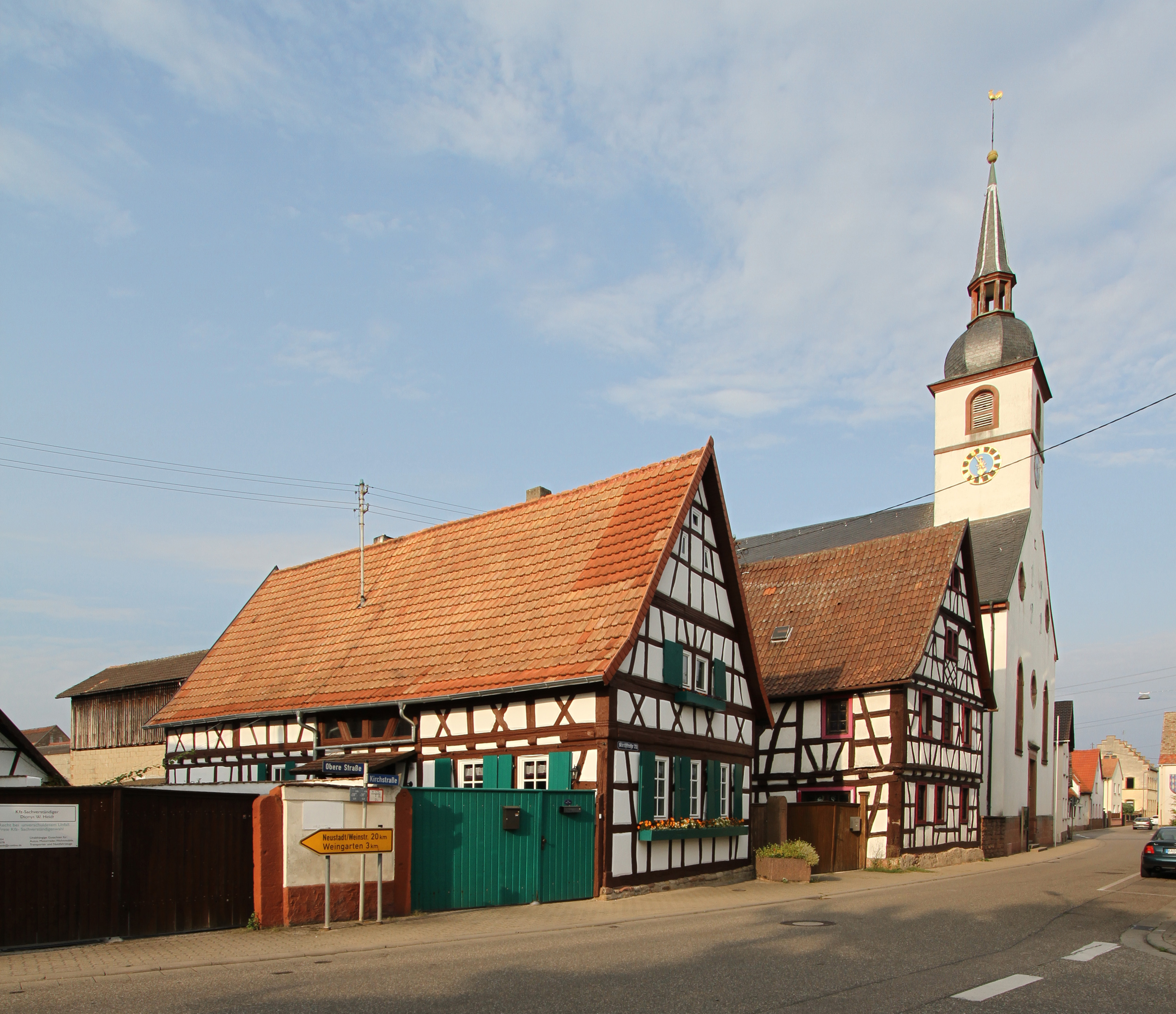

- Coat of arms

- Location of Westheim within Germersheim district
- Interactive map of Westheim
- Location within Germany Location within Rhineland-Palatinate
- Coordinates: 49°14′57″N 08°19′27″E
- Country: Germany
- State: Rhineland-Palatinate
- District: Germersheim
- Municipal assoc.: Lingenfeld

Government
  - Mayor (2019–24): Susanne Grabau (FW)

Area
  - Total: 7.13 km^{2} (2.75 sq mi)
- Elevation: 112 m (367 ft)

Population (2025-12-31)
  - Total: 1,710
  - Density: 240/km^{2} (621/sq mi)
- Time zone: UTC+01:00 (CET)
  - Summer (DST): UTC+02:00 (CEST)
- Postal codes: 67368
- Dialling codes: 06344
- Vehicle registration: GER
- Website: www.westheim-pfalz.de

Westheim (German pronunciation: [ˈvɛsthaɪm]) is a municipality in the district of Germersheim, in Rhineland-Palatinate, Germany.
