= Zeiskam =

- Municipality
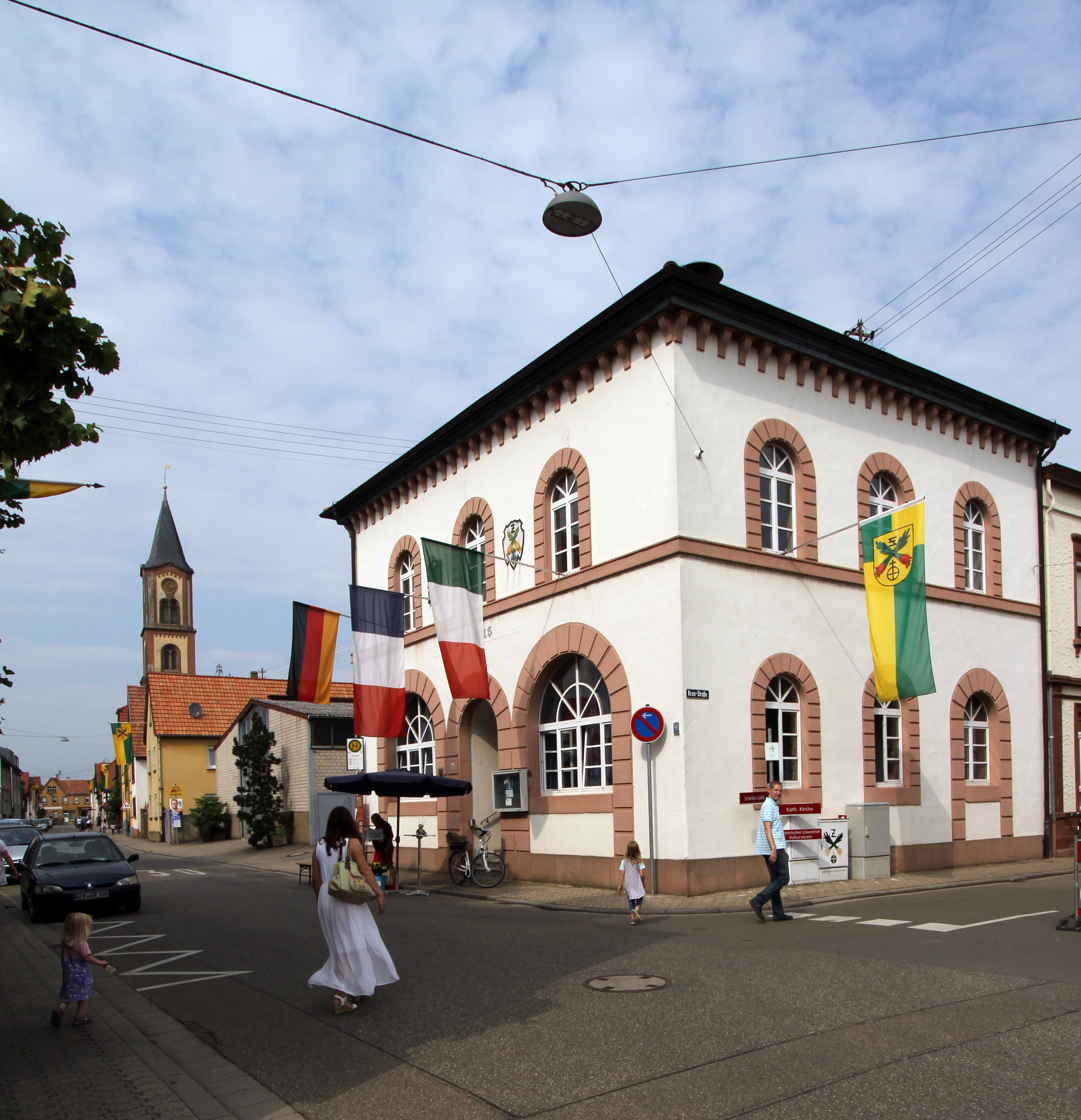
- Protestant church and city hall

- Flag Coat of arms

- Location of Zeiskam within Germersheim district
- Interactive map of Zeiskam
- Location within Germany Location within Rhineland-Palatinate
- Coordinates: 49°13′58″N 08°14′49″E
- Country: Germany
- State: Rhineland-Palatinate
- District: Germersheim
- Municipal assoc.: Bellheim

Government
  - Mayor (2019–25): Susanne Lechner (FW)

Area
  - Total: 8.85 km^{2} (3.42 sq mi)
- Elevation: 117 m (384 ft)

Population (2025-12-31)
  - Total: 2,197
  - Density: 248/km^{2} (643/sq mi)
- Time zone: UTC+01:00 (CET)
  - Summer (DST): UTC+02:00 (CEST)
- Postal codes: 67378
- Dialling codes: 06347
- Vehicle registration: GER
- Website: www.zeiskam.de

Zeiskam is a municipality in the district of Germersheim, in Rhineland-Palatinate, Germany.
