= Schwegenheim =

- Municipality
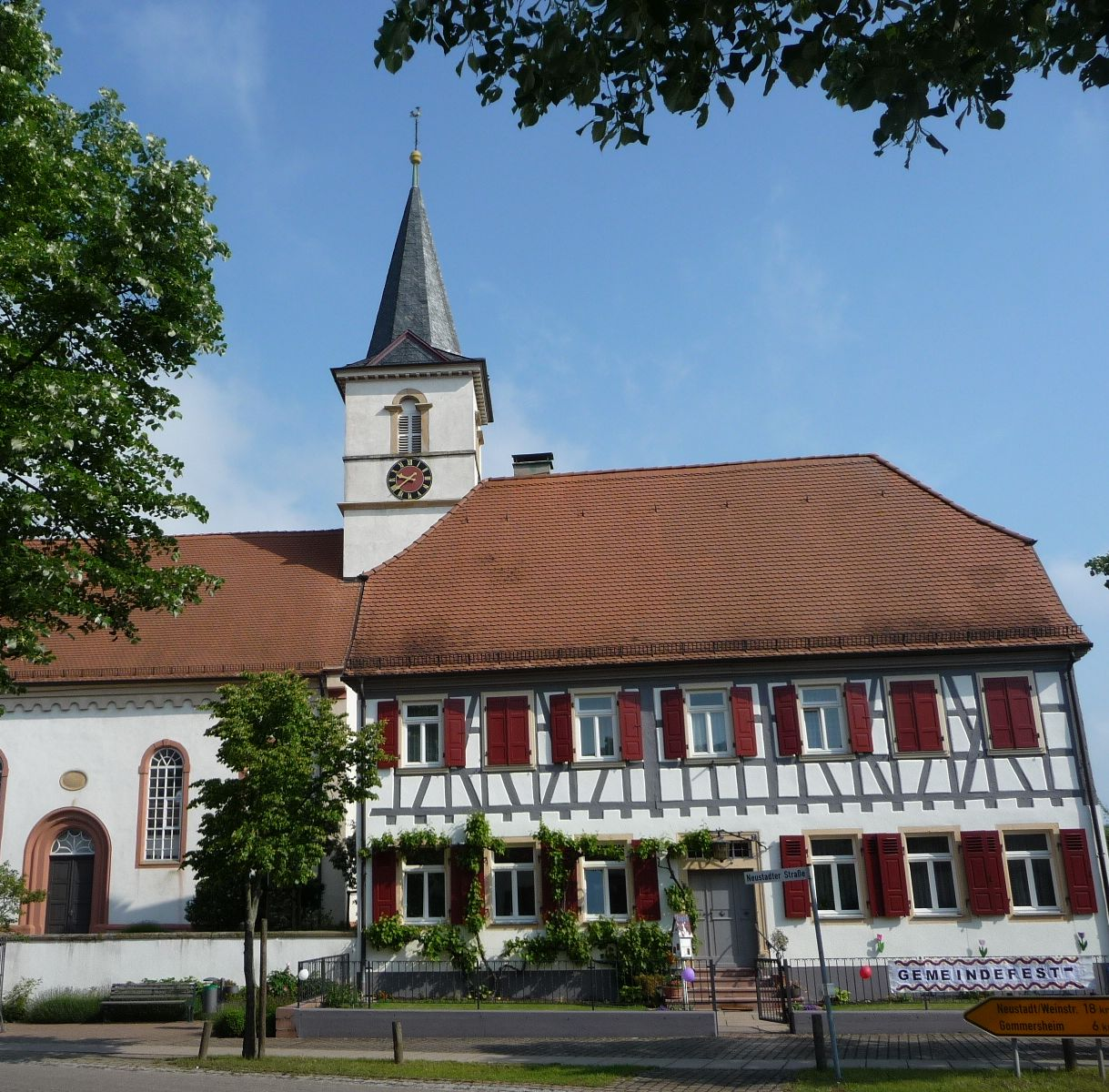
- Church and clergy house

- Coat of arms

- Location of Schwegenheim within Germersheim district
- Interactive map of Schwegenheim
- Location within Germany Location within Rhineland-Palatinate
- Coordinates: 49°16′12″N 08°19′42″E
- Country: Germany
- State: Rhineland-Palatinate
- District: Germersheim
- Municipal assoc.: Lingenfeld

Government
  - Mayor (2019–24): Bodo Lutzke (FW)

Area
  - Total: 12.27 km^{2} (4.74 sq mi)
- Elevation: 123 m (404 ft)

Population (2025-12-31)
  - Total: 3,242
  - Density: 264.2/km^{2} (684.3/sq mi)
- Time zone: UTC+01:00 (CET)
  - Summer (DST): UTC+02:00 (CEST)
- Postal codes: 67365
- Dialling codes: 06344
- Vehicle registration: GER
- Website: www.schwegenheim.de

Schwegenheim is a municipality in the district of Germersheim, in Rhineland-Palatinate, Germany.

== Notable people ==
- Julius von Kennel
