= Martin Brandl =

German politician (born 1981)

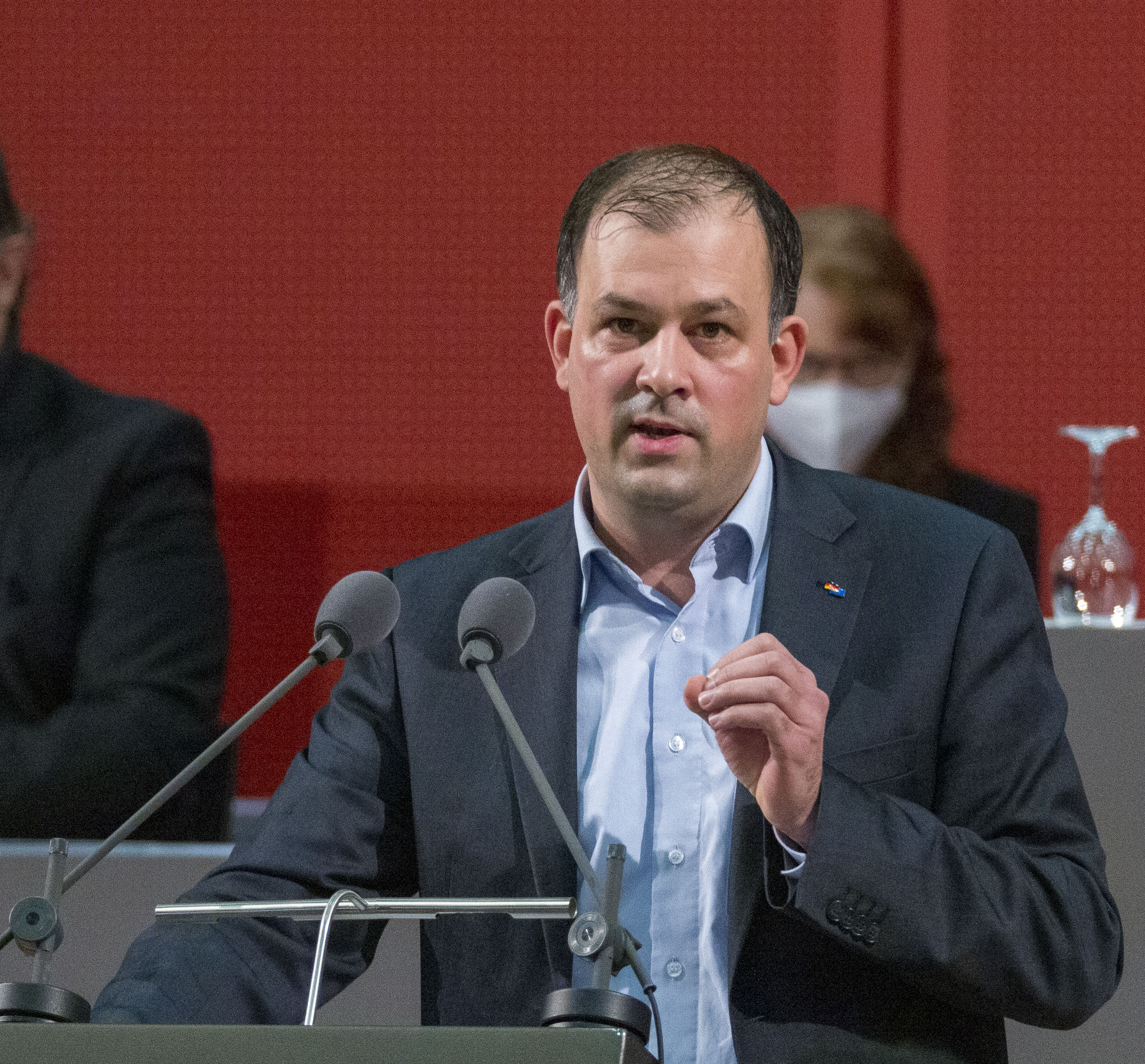
- Brandl in 2021

Landrat of Germersheim
- Incumbent
- Assumed office 1 December 2024
- Preceded by: Fritz Brechtel

Personal details
- Born: 27 April 1981 (age 44) Kandel
- Party: Christian Democratic Union (since 1996)

Martin Brandl (born 27 April 1981 in Kandel) is a German politician serving as Landrat of Germersheim since 2024. From 2009 to 2024, he was a member of the Landtag of Rhineland-Palatinate.
