= Kandel =

- Town
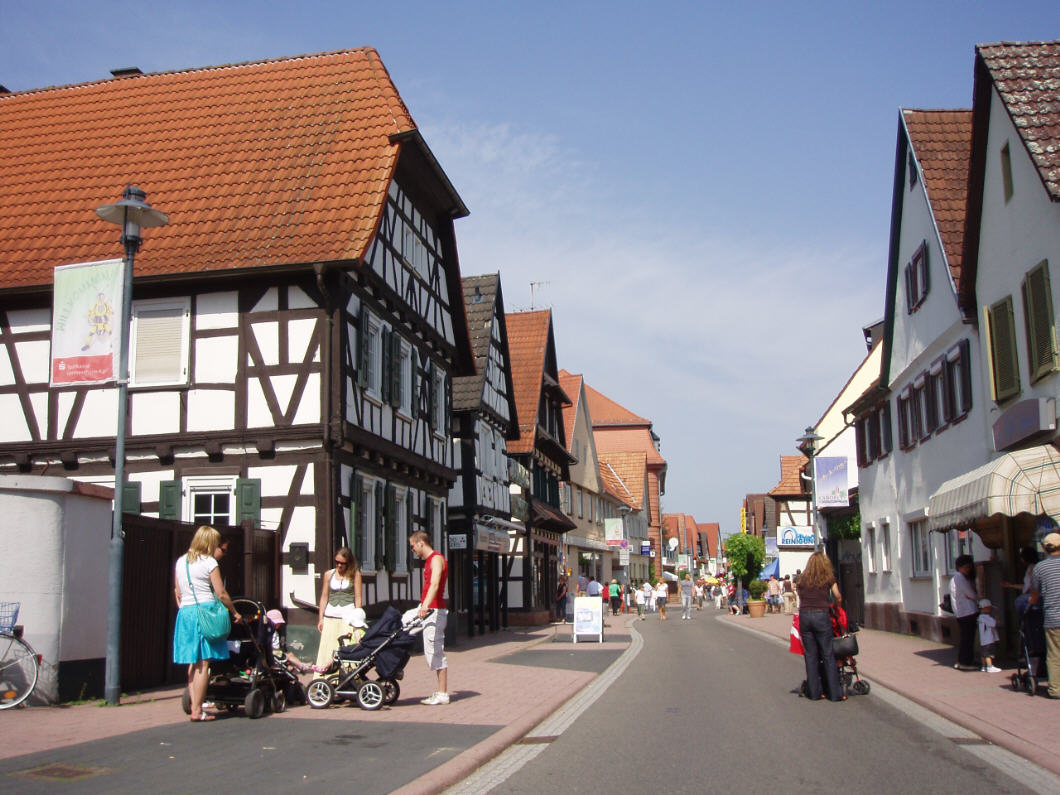
- Town centre

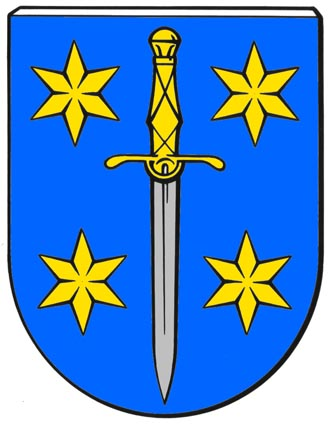
- Coat of arms

- Location of Kandel within Germersheim district
- Interactive map of Kandel
- Location within Germany Location within Rhineland-Palatinate
- Coordinates: 49°5′N 8°12′E
- Country: Germany
- State: Rhineland-Palatinate
- District: Germersheim
- Municipal assoc.: Kandel
- Subdivisions: 3

Government
  - Mayor (2024–28): Michael Karl Gaudier (CDU)

Area
  - Total: 26.69 km^{2} (10.31 sq mi)
- Elevation: 123 m (404 ft)

Population (2025-12-31)
  - Total: 9,285
  - Density: 347.9/km^{2} (901.0/sq mi)
- Time zone: UTC+01:00 (CET)
  - Summer (DST): UTC+02:00 (CEST)
- Postal codes: 76870
- Dialling codes: 07275
- Vehicle registration: GER
- Website: www.kandel.de

Kandel (German pronunciation: [ˈkandl̩]) is a town in the Germersheim district of Rhineland-Palatinate, Germany, near the border with France and approximately 18 km north-west of Karlsruhe, and 15 km south-east of Landau.

Kandel is twinned with the small Lancashire town of Whitworth.

Kandel is the seat of the Verbandsgemeinde ("collective municipality") Kandel.

== Coat of arms meaning ==
Star: Celestial goodness, noble person, leadership, excellence.

Sword: Justice and military honour.

Sky-Blue (Azure): Truth and loyalty.

== Notable inhabitants ==
The following overview contains notable people associated with Kandel. The list does not claim to be complete.

=== Honorary citizens ===
- 1980: Maria Wiesheu (Sister Himeria), a member of the Order of the Sisters of the Divine Redeemer, a province of Palatinate, Esthal, a long time active as a nurse in Kandel
- 1991: Oskar Böhm († 2001), 1955-1989 Mayor of the city of Kandel, 1972-1981 Mayor of the Association of Kandel

=== Sons and daughters of the city ===
- Franz Michael Leuchsenring (1746-1827), author
- Horst Schütz (born 1951), cyclist
- Ingrid Persohn (born 1952), cyclist and three-time German champion
- Martin Brandl (born 1981), politician
- Nadine Härdter (born 1981), handball player
- Manuel Hornig (born 1982), soccer player
- Pascal Ackermann (born 1994), cyclist
- Petrissa Solja (born 1994), table tennis player

=== People who have worked in Kandel ===
- Albert Hilger, (1839-1905), completed on the spot starting from 1854 a pharmacist teaching
