= Dataminr =

Artificial intelligence platform for event and risk detection

- Company type: Private company
- Industry: Real-time information
- Founded: 2009; 17 years ago
- Founders: Ted Bailey
- Headquarters: Manhattan, New York, U.S.
- Key people: Ted Bailey, CEO
- Products: Software as a Service
- Number of employees: 1050+ (2022)
- Website: dataminr.com

Dataminr is an artificial intelligence company. The company's private sector product, Dataminr Pulse, is used by corporations to monitor real-time events, and to aid with crisis response by providing playbooks, messaging tools and post-event documentation. Dataminr's First Alert technology is used by first responders, such as those helping to provide aid during natural disasters and other emergency events. Similar applications can be achieved by social surveillance vendors such as Feedly, Geofeedia, Raven Pack, Semantic Visions, ShadowDragon, and Signal AI.

Dataminr employs around 800 people and is headquartered in New York. The company has offices in New York City, Washington, D.C., Bozeman, and Seattle, as well as London, England, Dublin, Ireland, Melbourne, Australia, and Copenhagen, Denmark.

== History ==
Dataminr was founded in 2009 by Yale University graduates Ted Bailey, Sam Hendel and Jeff Kinsey. Dataminr came to wider notice when it issued an alert that Osama bin Laden had been killed 23 minutes faster than major news organizations.

In 2014, Dataminr entered into a partnership with CNN and Twitter, resulting in Dataminr for News, a tool to "alert journalists to information that’s emerging on Twitter in real time."

The company went on to detect clusters indicating future spikes in 14 different US states. Seven days later, all 14 states were hit hard by the coronavirus. Dataminr partnered with the UN in May 2019 to equip thousands of UN personnel with Dataminr's First Alert product for the public sector.

Dataminr's social media intelligence contract for the FBI was taken over by Zerofox at the end of 2020.

On the morning of January 5, 2021, Dataminr allegedly warned Capitol security officials of troubling online public chatter that would soon become the January 6 riot.

In July 2021, Dataminr conducted its first M&A transaction when it acquired WatchKeeper, a UK-based geovisualization platform. In the acquisition, Dataminr combined WatchKeeper's geovisualized data layers with its Pulse platform to provide context around events. A few months later, in October 2021, Dataminr acquired Krizo, a real-time crisis response platform based in Copenhagen, Denmark.

In 2025, Dataminr announced three separate funding rounds. In March 2025, it raised $85 million from NightDragon and HSBC. In April 2025, a further $100 million was obtained from Fortress Investment Group and NightDragon in the form of convertible debt. And then in September 2025, Dataminr completed an additional $300 million convertible debt financing round, again led by Fortress and NightDragon.

In October 2025, Dataminr announced plans to acquire cyber threat intelligence (CTI) firm ThreatConnect for $290 million in cash and equity.

== Controversies ==
=== Surveillance of law-abiding abortion rights protests ===
According to reports from The Intercept, Dataminr has provided social media surveillance on lawful, constitutionally-protected pro-abortion rights protests to the US Marshals.

=== Surveillance of racial justice protests ===
In 2020, The Intercept released a report that police departments used Dataminr services for surveillance during the George Floyd protests, including accessing social media posts about protest locations and actions. As written in the article, "The monitoring seems at odds with claims from both Twitter and Dataminr that neither company would engage in or facilitate domestic surveillance following a string of 2016 controversies." Twitter claimed that the company was just "news alerting." In response to the article, Dataminr clarified that "First Alert identifies breaking news events without any regard to the racial or ethnic composition of an area where a breaking news event occurs. … Race, ethnicity, or any other demographic characteristic of the people posting public social media posts about events is never part of determining whether a breaking news alert is sent to First Alert clients." It also said that "First Alert does not enable any type of geospatial analysis. First Alert provides no feature or function that allows a user to analyze the locations of specific social media posts, social media users or plot social media posts on a map."

=== Surveillance of pro-Palestinian protests and collaboration with LAPD ===
In 2025, The Intercept reported that Dataminr had surveilled pro-Palestinian protests in Los Angeles and had tipped off the LAPD to pro-Palestinian demonstrations. From October 2023 to April 2024, Dataminr had alerted the LAPD to more than 50 pro-Palestinian demonstrations, including a dozen before they had occurred. The University of Houston used Dataminr to surveil pro-Palestinian protests on its campus.
