= Shadow Dragon =

Shadow Dragon(s) may refer to:

- ShadowDragon, a set of Internet surveillance tools
- Fire Emblem: Shadow Dragon, a remake of the original Fire Emblem game for the Nintendo DS
- The Shadow Dragons by James A. Owen, the fourth novel of The Chronicles of the Imaginarium Geographica
- Shadow dragon, a dragon in the Dungeons & Dragons series
- Shadow Dragon (aircraft), a project to develop a hypersonic spaceplane for China.
- The Shadow Dragons, a group of antagonists in Dragon Ball GT

== See also ==
- Dragon (disambiguation)
