= Leo Tilman =

American businessman

Leo M. Tilman
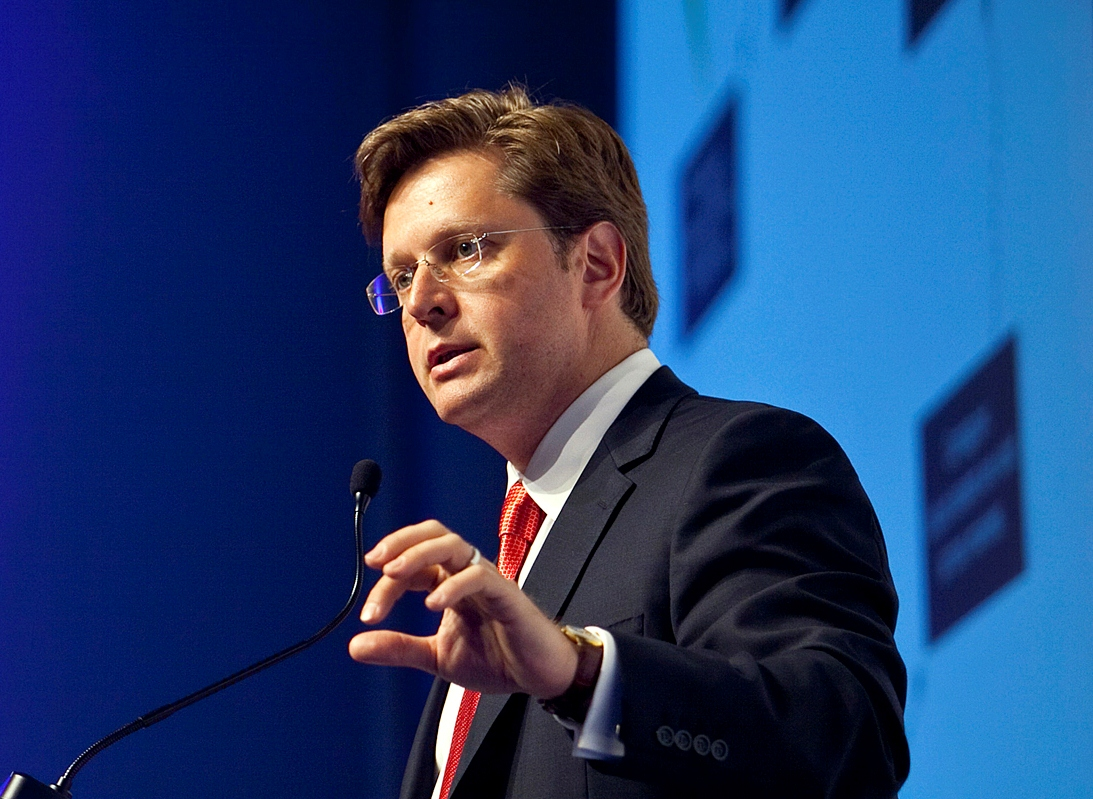
- Born: 1971 (age 54–55)
- Education: Columbia University; Harvard University
- Occupation: CEO of Agilion Systems
- Website: agilion.com

Leo M. Tilman (born 1971) is an American financier, author, and entrepreneur. He is a leading advisor to companies, investors, and governments who currently serves as Chairman & CEO of Agilion Systems, an advanced technology and strategic advisory firm. Before founding Agilion (formerly Tilman & Company), he was an executive at BlackRock and Bear Stearns and adjunct professor of finance at Columbia University.

Tilman is credited with predicting the 2008 financial crisis by revealing unsustainable global imbalances in his book Financial Darwinism. His equally-prophetic 2019 book Agility: How to Navigate the Unknown and Seize Opportunity in a World of Disruption, co-authored with former NORAD Commander General Charles H. Jacoby Jr., introduced a theory of organizational agility. The book's call for action—that leaders must learn how to navigate disruption and uncertainty—foreshadowed the global crises, the COVID pandemic, corporate blowups, military conflicts, and social strife.

Tilman is the author of other consequential works. His textbook Risk Management (2000), co-authored with BlackRock co-founder Dr. Bennett Golub, served as the intellectual underpinning of BlackRock's approach to risk management and the Aladdin risk platform. In collaboration with Nobel-Prize economist Edmund Phelps, he co-authored a 2010 Harvard Business Review proposal to reignite U.S. economic dynamism by creating the First National Bank of Innovation. In a 2012 European Financial Review article, he redefined the concept of risk intelligence as an essential new competence for companies and investors.

Tilman was the main architect of a 2014 public/private partnership involving the White House, U.S. Department of Treasury, U.S. Department of Agriculture, and the Farm Credit System that brought billions of private capital to innovative companies and projects.

He was profiled as Business Visionary by Forbes among "influential authors, decision makers, and thought leaders in the field of business" and honored as Young Global Leader of the World Economic Forum for "professional accomplishments, commitment to society and potential to contribute to shaping the future of the world."

== Education and early career ==
Tilman earned B.A. and M.A. in mathematics from Columbia University and executive education at the Kennedy School of Government at Harvard University and the Jackson Institute for Global Affairs at Yale University. Before founding Agilion and Tilman & Company, he was Chief Institutional Strategist and Senior Managing Director at Bear Stearns. He started his career at BlackRock.

== Current appointments ==
- Chairman & CEO, Agilion Systems, Inc.
- Trustee, Denver Museum of Nature and Science
- Co-Founder and Board Member, Institute for Science and Policy
- Board Member, Center on Capitalism and Society, Columbia University

== Former appointments ==
- Founder and CEO, Tilman & Company (now Agilion Systems)
- Adjunct Professor, Columbia University
- Executive Chairman, Capitol Peak
- Board Member, Atlantic Partnership
- Member, Colorado Forum
- International Advisory Board Member, British American Business
- Contributing Editor, The Journal of Risk Finance

== Selected bibliography ==
=== Articles ===
- The most agile day - strategy+business
- Wanted: A First National Bank of Innovation - Harvard Business Review
- Risk Intelligence: A Bedrock of Dynamism and Lasting Value Creation - European Financial Review
- Taming Risk In a Volatile World - Directorship
- The New Risk Paradigm for Corporate Governance - Chief Executive

Tilman is the creator of the Corporate Risk Scorecard, a holistic view of a company's business model and risk profile similar to a food Nutrition Label (Barrons) and co-author of the pioneering "Brain as a Business Model" framework (European Financial Review, 2014).

=== Books ===
- Risk Management (2000)
- Asset Liability Management (2003)
- Financial Darwinism (2008)
- Agility (2019)

=== Agility ===
"Agility is the most decisive factor in successfully navigating the Fourth Industrial Revolution and fulfilling its promise to humankind. In this important and compelling book, Tilman and Jacoby provide a comprehensive theory of agility and a practical guide to developing and leading agile organizations." – Klaus Schwab, Founder & Executive Chairman, World Economic Forum

Agility is a choice followed by action and hard work. It requires specific experience, understanding, and commitment. It demands engagement across the organization as well as a concerted investment in people and processes. Adopting the agility mindset allows organizations to thrive since it provides a new way of studying environments, making decisions, evaluating threats and opportunities, building cultures and relationships, defining True North (strategic and moral), and decisively executing. First, leaders must fully understand and embrace what agility means. Then they and their subordinates must be trained. It is through that shared understanding, training, and practice that the agility mindset is created.

Agility presents a call to action for leaders across public and private sectors that agility is needed and that it is achievable for any organization. When organizations make the choice to become agile, adopt the agility mindset, and acquire the requisite knowledge and capabilities—all while remaining vigilant—agility becomes their state of being. Agility is more effective than mere speed and adaptability. Organizations that adopt this mindset thrive amidst uncertainty and disruption, and are able to turn today's environment into an advantage—one that supports their vision.

=== Financial Darwinism ===
"Financial Darwinism explains the tectonic shifts now underway in the investment world far better than any book I have seen to date," writes David M. Rubenstein, co-Founder of The Carlyle Group. "Those who are interested in really understanding how financial markets have dramatically changed in the past few years – and how they are likely to change again in the next few years – would do well to read and absorb this important work by Leo Tilman."

Tilman's Financial Darwinism is based on the premise that today's complex economic and financial landscape requires executives, financial professionals, regulators, policy makers, and investors to adopt a radically new way of thinking and making decisions. Global systemic financial crises, periodic astonishing losses, and ruin of once-venerable institutions serve as convincing evidence on what happens otherwise, necessitating a road map to the new financial order and an essential guide to adapting and succeeding in it.

Financial Darwinism analyzes the dominant global forces behind the tectonic financial shift that has taken place in finance of the past quarter century and then comprehensively explores the challenges facing financial institutions as well as the universe of their potential responses. Conceptually, it consists of two highly interrelated parts. The first one is the evolutionary thesis called Dynamic Finance. This thesis explains the origins and drivers of the profound changes in the global financial system. Tilman proposes that the basic key to understanding the behavior of modern financial institutions and capital markets lies in the recognition of the fact that the process of economic value creation in finance has undergone a fundamental transformation. More specifically, due to significant margin pressures on basic financial businesses, active risk taking has begun to play an increasingly dominant role how financial institutions create (and destroy) shareholder value. In order to demonstrate this, the book introduces the concept of risk-based economic performance that helps depart from the outdated accounting-earnings-inspired mental paradigm. Throughout, the dynamism of risk-taking and business decisions is emphasized as a distinguishing characteristic of the dynamic new world vis-à-vis the old financial regime.

Managing modern financial institutions is a task of enormous uncertainty, scope and complexity. Thus, the second part of this book uses this evolutionary perspective to introduce an actionable decision-making framework designed to help financial executives respond the ongoing challenges. Together, the decision-making framework, the evolutionary thesis, and the risk-based economic performance equation filter out the complexity of the financial world and give financial executives a set of tools and choices on how to create or enhance economic value. They help define financial institutions' strategic vision that properly integrates customer-related and risk-taking decisions, thus unifying business strategy, corporate finance, investment analysis, and risk management. Lastly, they help determine an "optimal" way to implement the strategic vision using the entire arsenal of advanced financial tools. In the process, risk management naturally becomes the very language of strategic decisions.

Financial Darwinism, which is a prelude to risk intelligence, helps financial institutions and investors deliver sustainable economic performance amidst complex, uncertain, and constantly evolving business and market environments.
