= Silvestre S. Herrera =

WWII US Army Pfc Medal of Honor France 1945 Mexican-American

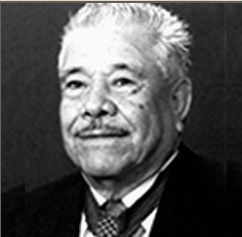
- PFC Silvestre S. Herrera, Medal of Honor recipient
- Born: July 17, 1917; Camargo, Chihuahua, Mexico
- Died: November 26, 2007 (aged 90); Glendale, Arizona, US
- Burial place: West Resthaven Park Cemetery, Glendale, Arizona
- Military career
- Allegiance: United States
- Branch: United States Army
- Service years: 1944–1946
- Rank: Sergeant
- Units: 2nd Battalion, 142d Infantry, 36th Infantry Division
- Conflicts: World War II
- Awards: Medal of Honor; Purple Heart; Order of Military Merit (Mexico)

Silvestre Santana Herrera (July 17, 1917 – November 26, 2007) was a private first class of the United States Army who received the Medal of Honor for his heroic actions in Mertzwiller, France, during World War II.

He mounted a one-man charge on an enemy stronghold, resulting in the single-handed capture of eight enemy soldiers. Shortly afterward, his unit came under fire from a machine-gun emplacement across another minefield. Herrera again that day single-handedly took on the enemy. While crossing the second minefield, he lost one of his legs to a land mine explosion then the other leg to a second explosion. Unable to continue his 1-man advance and despite a severe loss of blood, he single-handedly held the forward position to provide covering fire pinning down the enemy with his M1 Garand. His accurate rifle fire allowed his comrades to overrun the enemy position in a flanking action clear of the minefield.

Born in Mexico of Hispanic heritage, Herrera was the only living person authorized to wear both the Medal of Honor and Mexico's Order of Military Merit (First Class) at the time of his death. A legend in the state of Arizona, he was honored by the city of Phoenix officially renaming the portion of 3rd Street that runs from Indian School Road North into the park, "S. Herrera Way".

== Early years ==
I am a Mexican-American and we have a tradition. We're supposed to be men, not sissies.

— Silvestre S. Herrera

Herrera was born in the Mexican city of Camargo, Chihuahua, and not, as he believed until he was twenty-seven, in El Paso, Texas. His parents died in an influenza epidemic when he was only a year old, and the man he had thought was his father was really an uncle who had brought the 18-month-old Herrera there to provide him with a better life in the United States. Herrera worked as a farm hand, marrying and raising a family in El Paso before moving to Phoenix, Arizona with his American wife Ramona and three children, Mary, Elva, Silvestre, Jr. and his uncle. When the United States entered World War II Herrera was drafted into the Texas National Guard, 36th Division. Expecting yet another child, Herrera felt it would be important for his parents to be there for him while he was gone and so went to break the news.

That is when the man Herrera had believed to be his father gave him the stunning news of his Mexican birth, and said, "Son, you don't have to go, they can't draft you...you aren't an American citizen." Even in the face of these multiple shocks, and what might have seemed like a perfect opportunity to dodge the war, Herrera was unswayed. As he later related, "I thought, I'm going anyway. I didn't want anybody to die in my place... I felt that I had my adopted country that had been so nice to me. I thought, I have an American wife and the kids and one on the way." It was only the first of several life-changing acts of heroism Herrera would take. (Despite these recollections, noncitizen Mexican nationals living in the United States were and are subject to US draft laws).

== World War II ==
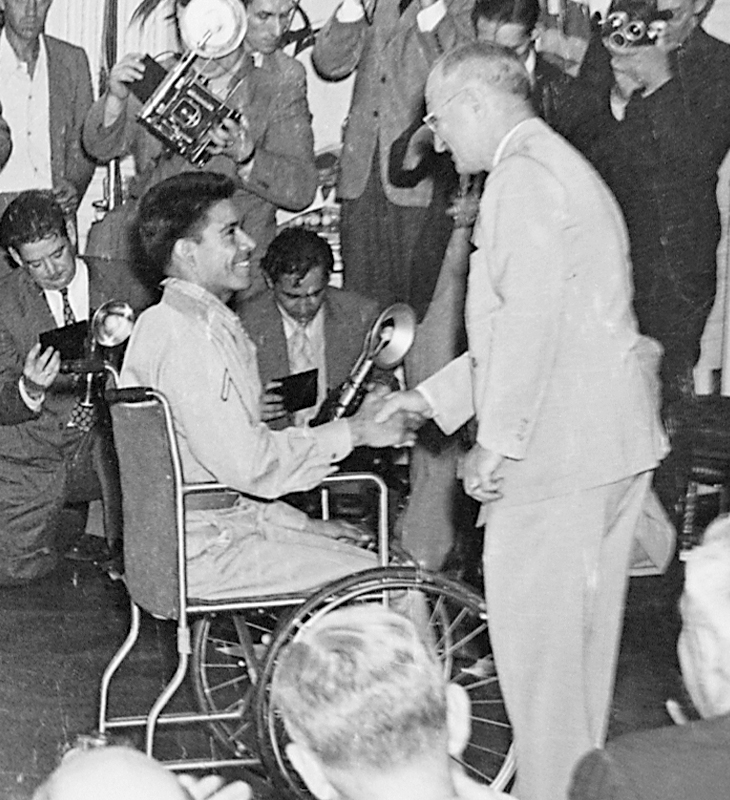
Herrera and President Harry S. Truman shake hands at the Medal of Honor presentation ceremony in the East Room of the White House (August 23, 1945)

The 142d Infantry landed in Italy in the autumn of 1944 to stage for its deployment in France. Upon the completion of Operation Dragoon in mid-September Mediterranean French ports were liberated. The 142nd landed in Marseilles in the Fall, then deployed near the front in the Alsace region in early March 1945.

On March 15, kick-off day of Operation Undertone, an attack on German positions along a 75 km line from Saarbrücken to Haguenau, 1945 Herrera's unit found itself engaged in combat in a forest in the vicinity of the Bas-Rhin town of Mertzwiller, 5 miles northwest of Haguenau. His platoon came under heavy enemy machine gun fire from the woods, forcing most of the men to seek cover. Herrera charged the enemy stronghold single-handedly, firing his M1 rifle from his hip and ending the threat with a pair of grenades. Eight enemy soldiers threw down their weapons and surrendered.

Later that same day, his platoon was attacked and pinned down by a second enemy stronghold, protected by an extensive mine field. Ignoring the danger Herrera again single-handedly charged, seeking to draw fire away from his comrades. A mine exploded and shattered one leg below the knee. Staggering up on his good leg he stepped on a second, severing that leg below the knee. Still Herrera laid machine gun fire while kneeling, allowing members of his platoon to skirt the mine field and capture the enemy position.

As Herrera lay in the Army hospital recovering from his wounds, President Truman was not sure the young man would be well enough for a formal presentation of the Medal of Honor. However, on August 23, 1945, Silvestre rolled his wheelchair across the White House lawn so that the President could present him with his award.

"He told me he would rather be awarded the Medal of Honor than be president of the United States," Herrera recalled in a 2005 interview. "That made me even more proud."

== Later years ==
Valle Del Sol, Inc. recognized Herrera with a Special Recognition Award in 1994, and with a Hall of Fame award in 1999. On March 13, 1996, Herrera was honored by the United States House of Representatives upon recommendation of Congressman Ed Pastor. An elementary school in Phoenix, Arizona – the Silvestre S Herrera School – bears his name.

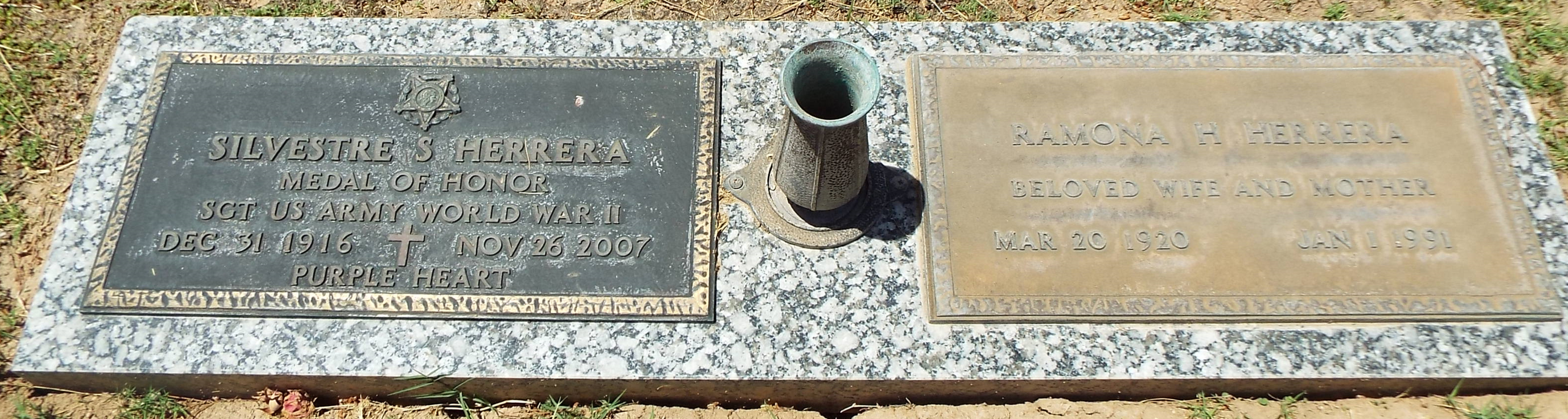
Grave-site of Silvestre S. Herrera and his wife Ramona

On October 24, 1998, the United States Army Reserve Center in Mesa, which houses the 164th Corps Support Group and later, the 6253rd United States Army Hospital, was dedicated in honor of Silvestre S. Herrera. This dedication was thanks in large part to the efforts of neighbor and long time admirer of Herrera, Sergeant Major Douglas Mattson (retired).

On November 26, 2007, Herrera died at his home in Glendale, Arizona. He was buried with full military honors in the West Resthaven Park Cemetery in Glendale. He was buried alongside his wife Ramona, who died in 1991.

== Medal of Honor citation ==
Silvestre S. Herrera
Rank and organization: Private First Class, U.S. Army, Company E, 142d Infantry, 36th Infantry Division.
Place and date: Near Mertzwiller, France, March 15, 1945.
Entered service at: Phoenix, Arizona
G.O. No.: 75, September 5, 1945.
Citation:

He advanced with a platoon along a wooded road until stopped by heavy enemy machinegun fire. As the rest of the unit took cover, he made a 1-man frontal assault on a strongpoint and captured 8 enemy soldiers. When the platoon resumed its advance and was subjected to fire from a second emplacement beyond an extensive minefield, Pvt. Herrera again moved forward, disregarding the danger of exploding mines, to attack the position. He stepped on a mine and had both feet severed but, despite intense pain and unchecked loss of blood, he pinned down the enemy with accurate rifle fire while a friendly squad captured the enemy gun by skirting the minefield and rushing in from the flank. The magnificent courage, extraordinary heroism, and willing self-sacrifice displayed by Pvt. Herrera resulted in the capture of 2 enemy strongpoints and the taking of 8 prisoners.

=== Portrait of Valor ===
From the book Medal of Honor: Portraits of Valor Beyond the Call of Duty:

Silvestre Herrera was twenty-seven years old, married with three children, and working in his hometown of Phoenix, Arizona, when he was drafted into the Army in January 1944. Men with families were no longer exempt from the service – in basic training, he met another draftee who said he was the father of eight.

Private First Class Herrera's company landed in Italy, by this time largely under Allied control, as part of the 142nd Infantry in the summer of 1944. That fall they landed in France at Marseille and took a troop train to the front. By the end of the year, as his unit reached France, it began to encounter resistance from the retreating Germans. When the fighting became heavy by the spring of 1945, Herrera had to concede a grudging respect for the enemy, regarding them as "muy machos."

On March 15, Herrera's platoon was advancing along a wooded road near the French town of Mertzwiller when it ran into two German machine-gun emplace-ments. Caught in a deadly crossfire between the two guns, the GIs dived for cover. Fearing that his comrades would be cut to pieces, Herrera stood up and ran toward the closest enemy position, firing his rifle from the hip. He tossed two grenades at the machine-gun nest; the concussion knocked the Germans down. Then he was on them, and all eight soldiers threw down their weapons and surrendered to him.

Herrera turned his prisoners over to men in his squad, then started crawling toward the other machine gun, firing as he went. ("My M-1 was talking, and the Germans understood what it was saying," he commented later.) The position was protected by a minefield; GIs were throwing rocks into the area in an effort to explode the mines. Herrera got up and charged the Germans anyway, but as he neared the machine-gun nest, he stepped on a mine. He was thrown to the ground, both of his feet blown off at the ankle. Though bleeding heavily, he lay on his stomach and fired at the Germans, forcing them to stay down and thus enabling his squad to skirt the minefield, flank the enemy, and move in for the kill.

Herrera remained conscious for the next few hours. At the aid station, he said to the examining doctor, "Just try to save my knees, Doc." After two months in an Army field hospital, he was sent to the Army Amputation Center in Utah.

During a ninety-day furlough to Phoenix, he was notified that he was to receive the Medal of Honor and traveled to Washington with an uncle who was given time off from his job to help him make the trip. In time, Silvestre Herrera would be fitted with new prosthetic feet, but on August 23, 1945, at the White House, President Harry Truman bent over his wheelchair to present him with the Medal of Honor.

=== More honors ===
A year after Herrera received his White House presentation of the Medal of Honor from President Truman, the Government of Mexico presented him with its Order of Military Merit (First Class).

Herrera became the first resident from Arizona to receive the Medal of Honor during World War II. Arizona Governor Sidney P. Osborn declared August 14, 1945 to be "Herrera Day" and welcomed home Pfc. Silvestre S. Herrera with a hero's parade. A drive to bestow upon him citizenship of the only country he knew was started and as a result he was granted United States Citizenship. The citizens of Arizona raised $14,000 to provide him and his growing family with a new home.

== Awards and decorations ==

Badge	Combat Infantryman Badge		
1st row	Medal of Honor		
2nd row	Bronze Star Medal	Purple Heart	Army Good Conduct Medal
3rd row	American Campaign Medal	European–African–Middle Eastern Campaign Medal with 1 campaign star	World War II Victory Medal

Mexican Order of Military Merit

(First Class)

== See also ==
- List of Medal of Honor recipients
- List of Medal of Honor recipients for World War II
- List of Hispanic Medal of Honor recipients
- Hispanic Americans in World War II
