= Camille Stewart =

American attorney, public speaker, and entrepreneur

Camille Stewart Gloster
- Education: Bachelor of Science degree in business International Affairs Cybersecurity
- Alma mater: Miami University (BS); American University Washington College of Law (JD); Harvard Kennedy School Belfer Center
- Occupation: Global Head of Product Security Strategy at Google.
- Website: www.camillestewart.com

Camille Stewart Gloster is an American technology and cybersecurity attorney, public speaker, and entrepreneur. She is the founder and CEO of CAS Strategies and the author of The Insider You Built: How Organizations Stay In Control of Autonomous AI Agents. She served as the senior policy advisor for the U.S. Department of Homeland Security under the Obama administration from 2015 to 2017. She also served as the Head of Product Security Strategy for Google after serving as the lead for Security Policy & Election Integrity, Google Play & Android.

Camille sits on the Board of The Cyber Guild. She is co-founder of the Foundation Layer Institute and advises leading industry convenings, including the Black Hat CISO Summit and the AI Security Forum.

== Early life and education ==
With her father being a computer scientist, she became interested and pulled towards the knowledge of technology. She also had a strong passion for law as a child and knew she would become a lawyer. In fact, Camille began her career early by having her parents sign contracts when they would make promises. She graduated from Miami University with a Bachelor of Science degree in business, and later attended American University Washington College of Law to earn her Juris Doctor degree. In 2020 she was selected to be a part of the Harvard Kennedy School Belfer Center for Science and International Affairs Cybersecurity Fellowship.

She holds a CISSP, a PMP, and a Chief Information Security Officer certificate from Carnegie Mellon University.

== Career and professional life ==
While in law school, she studied intellectual property protection, theft, and abuse online. Upon graduating, she worked for Cyveillance, a cyber threat intelligence company. Camille also spent time on Capitol Hill as a Legal Fellow for Representative. Marcia Fudge and Rep. Emanuel Cleaver II Congressional Black Caucus.

In 2015 she was appointed by the Obama administration as the Senior Policy advisor for the U.S. Department of Homeland Security. Her experience in that role empowered her to work towards advancing former president Barack Obama's cybersecurity vision, especially with respect to methods used by Chinese companies to acquire American assets without review by Committee on Foreign Investment in the United States.

In 2021, Stewart was the lead for security policy for Google Play & Android. She co-founded #ShareTheMicInCyber which aims to focus on the role of Black people in cybersecurity. A 2020 op-ed piece on CNN by Stewart and Michèle Flournoy was cited by the New York Times in an article citing the need for a more diverse set of views in venues ranging from board rooms to national security. According to Politico, Stewart joined New America as a fellow in 2022. Stewart also works with the public to increase awareness about cybersecurity and the need for increased diversity in the field, and tools people can use to avoid computer scams.

Stewart is the founder of the legal consultancy and startup incubator, MarqueLaw, PLLC, and TheDigitalCounselor.com blog which develops and promotes forward-thinking solutions and leaders in cybersecurity. She currently serves on the board of directors for the International Foundation for Electoral Systems.

== Honors and awards ==
In 2016, she received the Leadership Awards Rising Star award from Women in Technology. In 2019 she was named woman of the year in the 'barrier breaker' category of the Cyber Security Women awards, and was honored by New America and The Diversity in National Security Network for her contributions to national security and foreign policy. In 2021, The Root magazine named her one of the 100 most influential African Americans of 2021.
