= Operation Undertone =

US military operation in World War 2

- Part of the Western Allied invasion of Germany in the Western Front of the European theatre of World War II
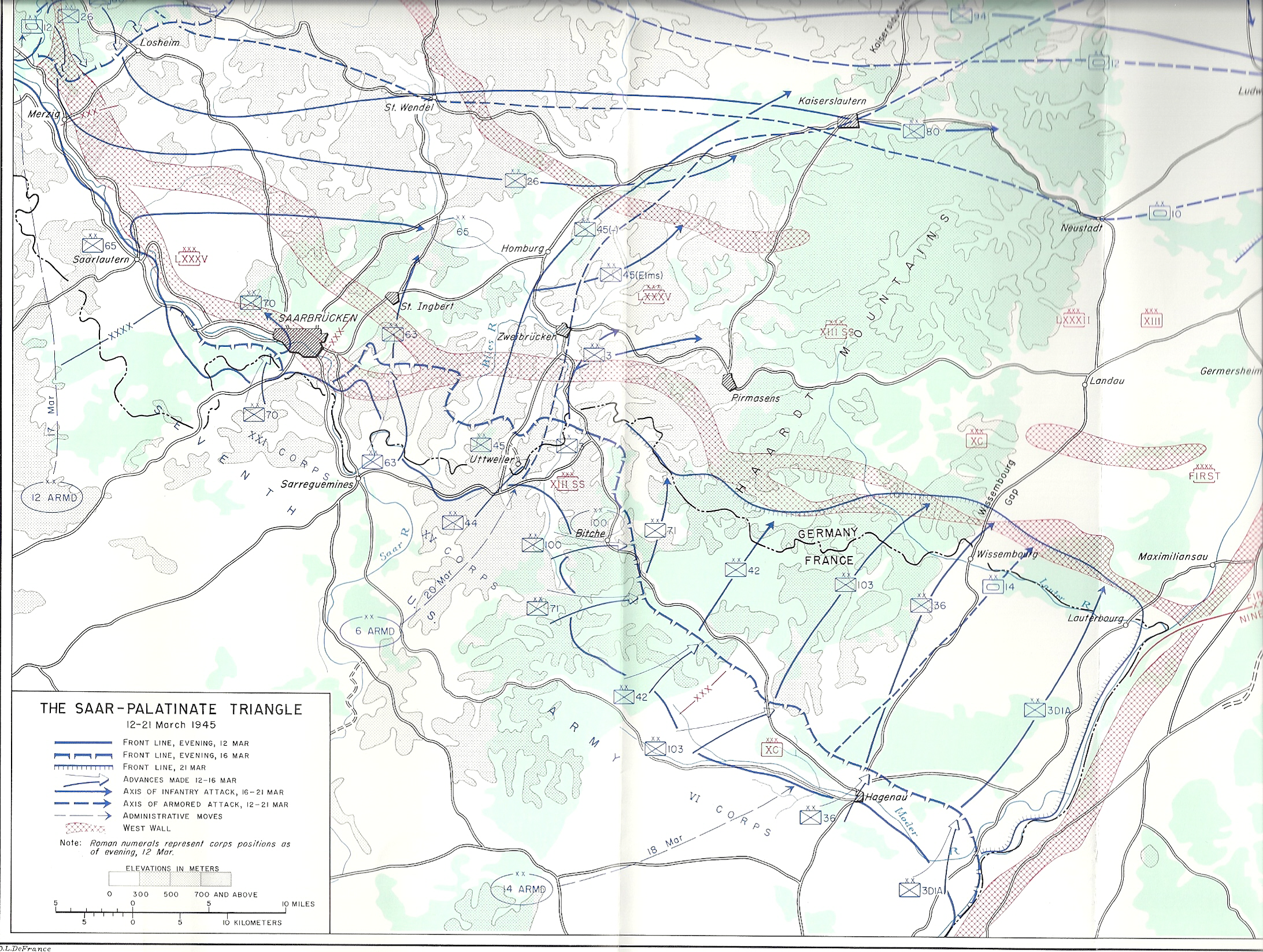
Date	8–24 March 1945
Location	sector from Luxembourg to Alsace
Result	Allied victory

Belligerents
United States; France	Germany

Commanders and leaders
(United States) Jacob L. Devers (United States) Omar Bradley; Jean de Lattre de Tassigny	(Nazi Germany) Paul Hausser

Casualties and losses
17,220: 3,540 killed	c. 22,000
- German casualties do not include KIA, WIA, or those inflicted by U.S. Third Army. Allied casualties are for the U.S. Seventh Army (12,000) and French TF de Monsabert (887).

Operation Undertone, also known as the Saar-Palatinate Offensive, was a large assault by the U.S. Seventh, Third, and French First Armies of the Sixth and Twelfth Army Groups as part of the Allied invasion of Germany in March 1945 during World War II.

A force of three corps was to attack abreast from Saarbrücken, Germany, along a 75-kilometre (47 mi) sector to a point southeast of Hagenau, France. A narrow strip along the Rhine leading to the extreme northeastern corner of Alsace at Lauterbourg was to be cleared by a division of the French First Army under operational control of the Seventh Army. The Seventh Army's main effort was to be made in the center up the Kaiserslautern corridor.

In approving the plan, Supreme Allied Commander General Dwight D. Eisenhower asserted that the objective was not only to clear the Saar-Palatinate but to establish bridgeheads with forces of the Sixth Army Group over the Rhine between Mainz and Mannheim. The U.S. Third Army of the Twelfth Army Group was to be limited to diversionary attacks across the Moselle to protect the Sixth Army Group's left flank.

Opposing commanders were U.S. General Jacob L. Devers, commanding U.S. Sixth Army Group, and German SS General Paul Hausser, commanding German Army Group G.

Significantly assisted by operations of the Third Army that overran German lines of communication, Operation Undertone cleared Wehrmacht defenses and pushed to the Rhine in the area of Karlsruhe within 10 days. General Devers' victory—along with a rapid advance by the U.S. Third Army—completed the advance of Allied armies to the west bank of the Rhine along its entire length within Germany.

The bulk of the text in this article is taken directly from The Last Offensive, a work of the U.S. Army that is in the public domain. The material was extracted from Chapter XII, "The Saar-Palatinate", pp. 236–265.

== Plan ==
Anticipating early completion of operations to clear the west bank of the Rhine north of the Moselle, Supreme Allied Commander General Dwight D. Eisenhower on 13 February 1945 had told his two American army group commanders—Generals Omar Bradley and Jacob L. Devers—to begin planning for a joint drive to sweep the Saar-Palatinate. Assigned a target date of 15 March, the offensive was to begin only after the 21st Army Group had reached the Rhine. It was to be designed both to draw enemy units from the north and to provide an alternate line of attack across the Rhine should the principal Allied drive in the north fail. The main effort, SHAEF planners contemplated, was to be made by the Sixth Army Group's Seventh Army, which was to be augmented by transferring one armored and three infantry divisions from the U.S. Third Army.

During the first week of March, Devers at Sixth Army Group approved a plan (Operation UNDERTONE) prepared by General Alexander Patch′s Seventh Army. A force of three corps was to attack abreast from Saarbrücken along a 75-kilometre (47 mi) sector to a point southeast of Hagenau. A narrow strip along the Rhine leading to the extreme northeastern corner of Alsace at Lauterbourg was to be cleared by a division of the French First Army under operational control of the Seventh Army. The Seventh Army's main effort was to be made in the center up the Kaiserslautern corridor.

In approving the plan, Eisenhower asserted that the objective was not only to clear the Saar-Palatinate but to establish bridgeheads with forces of the Sixth Army Group over the Rhine between Mainz and Mannheim. The U.S. Third Army of the 12th Army Group was to be limited to diversionary attacks across the Moselle to protect the Sixth Army Group's left flank.

Eisenhower approved on 8 March, the same day that General George S. Patton obtained approval from General Bradley for the plan prepared by the Third Army staff for a major attack across the Moselle.

The 12th Army Group commander in turn promoted the plan with Eisenhower. Noting that the Germans had given no indication of withdrawing from the Siegfried Line in front of the Seventh Army and that Patch thus might be in for a long, costly campaign, Bradley suggested that the Third Army jump the Moselle near Koblenz, sweep south along the west bank of the Rhine to cut the enemy's supply lines, and at the same time press from its previously established Saar-Moselle bridgehead near Trier to come at the Siegfried Line fortifications from the rear. Eisenhower approved the plan without qualification.

Although Devers was briefly reluctant to endorse Third Army operations south of the Moselle lest the two forces become entangled with their converging thrusts, he too in the end approved the plan. He and Bradley agreed on a new boundary that afforded the Third Army a good road leading northeast from Saarlautern to headwaters of the Nahe River, some 56 km (35 mi) northeast of Saarlautern, thence along the valley of the Nahe to the Rhine at Bingen. This boundary gave the Third Army responsibility for clearing the northwestern third of the Saar-Palatinate. Bradley and Devers also authorized the commanders of the two armies—Third and Seventh—to deal directly with each other rather than through their respective army group headquarters.

Facing the undented fortifications of the Siegfried Line, the Seventh Army commander planned a set-piece attack, preceded by an extensive program of aerial bombardment. Before the attack could begin, supplies had to be accumulated, division and corps boundaries adjusted, some units shuffled, and new divisions joining the army fed into jump-off positions. This meant to Patch that the Seventh Army could not attack before the target date, 15 March.

== Assault ==
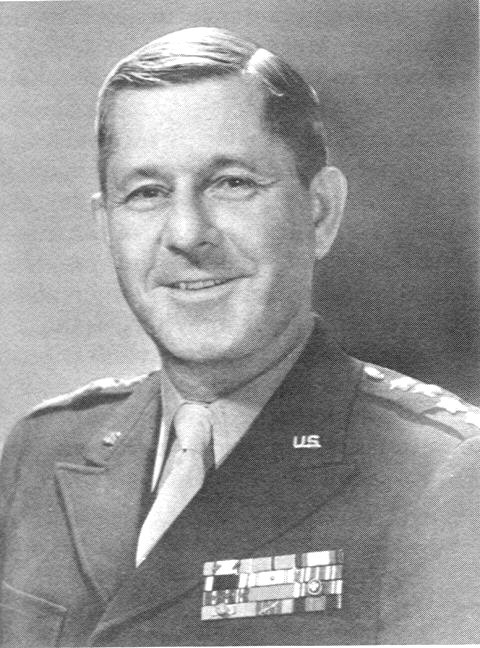
General Jacob Devers

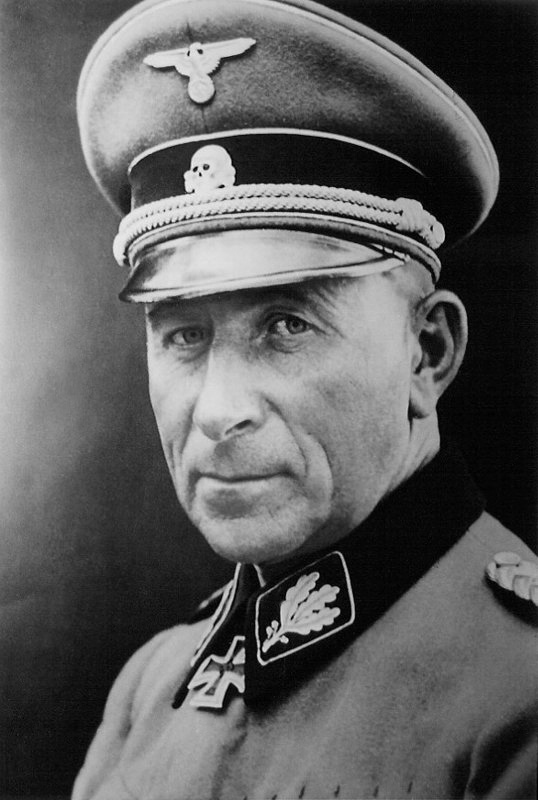
SS General Paul Hausser

All along the Moselle, from Koblenz to Trier, the German 7. Armee on 17 March was in peril, if not from direct attack, then from the flanking thrust against the right wing of the 1. Armee by General Walton Walker′s XX Corps. Collapse of the 7. Armee clearly was but a question of time. Soon the German 1. Armee, too, would be in dire straits, for the U.S. Seventh Army two days earlier, on 15 March, had launched a drive against General Hermann Foertsch′s army along a 110 km (68 mi) front from the vicinity of Saarlautern southeastward to the Rhine. Even if that offensive failed to penetrate the Siegfried Line, it might tie the 1. Armee troops to the fortifications while Patton's forces took them from the rear.

The Seventh Army numbered among its ranks several relatively inexperienced units but retained a flavoring of long-term veterans. The VI Corps (Maj. Gen. Edward H. Brooks), for example, and three divisions—the 3rd, 36th, and 45th—had fought at length in the Mediterranean theater, including the Anzio beachhead. The XV Corps (Maj. Gen. Wade H. Haislip) had joined the Seventh Army after fighting across France with the Third Army. A third corps, the XXI (Maj. Gen. Frank W. Milburn), was relatively new, having joined the army in January.

As the Seventh Army offensive began, the basic question was how stubbornly the Germans would defend before falling back on the Siegfried Line. Only Milburn's XXI Corps—on the Seventh Army's left wing, near Saarbrücken—was fairly close to the Siegfried Line, while other units were as much as 32 km (20 mi) away. Making the army's main effort in the center, Haislip's XV Corps faced what looked like a particularly troublesome obstacle in the town of Bitche. Surrounded by fortresses of the French Maginot Line, Bitche had been taken from the Germans in December after a hard struggle, only to be relinquished in the withdrawal forced by the German counteroffensive. On the army's right wing, Brooks's VI Corps—farthest of all from the Siegfried Line—first had to get across the Moder River, and one of Brooks's divisions faced the added difficulty of attacking astride the rugged Lower Vosges Mountains.

Two German corps and part of a third were in the path of the impending American drive. At Saarbrücken, the left wing of General Knieß′ LXXXV Korps would receive a glancing blow from Milburn's XXI Corps. Having recently given up the 559. Volksgrenadierdivision to the 7. Armee, Knieß had only two divisions, one of which was tied down holding Siegfried Line positions northwest of Saarbrücken. Southeast of the town, with boundaries roughly coterminous with those of Haislip's XV Corps, stood the XIII SS Korps (SS-Gruppenführer und Generalleutnant der Waffen-SS Max Simon) with three divisions. Extending the line to the Rhine was the XC Korps (General der Infanterie Erich Petersen) with two volksgrenadier divisions and remnants of an infantry training division.

Although the Germans worried most about a breakthrough in the sector of Petersen's XC Korps into the Wissembourg Gap rather than through Simon's XIII SS Korps into the Kaiserslautern corridor, the shifts and countershifts made in preceding weeks to salvage reinforcements for the 7. Armee actually had left the XIII SS Korps the stronger. In addition to two Volksgrenadier divisions, Simon's corps had the 17th SS Panzergrenadierdivision, at this point not much more than a proud name, but a unit possessing considerably more tanks and other armored vehicles than were to be found in the entire adjacent corps. The American main effort thus aimed at the stronger German units, though at this stage of the war strength in regard to German divisions was but a relative term.

As Patch's Seventh Army attacked before daylight on 15 March, the apparent answer on German intentions was quick to come. Only in two places could the resistance be called determined. One was on the left wing, where the 63rd Infantry Division (Maj. Gen. Louis E. Hibbs) sought to bypass Saarbrücken on the east and cut German escape routes from the city. The fact that the 63rd Division early hit the Siegfried Line provided ready explanation for the stanch opposition there. The other was on the extreme right wing where an attached 3rd Algerian Infantry Division (3e Division d'Infanterie d'Algerie) was to clear the expanse of flatland between Hagenau and the Rhine. There an urban area closely backing the Moder River defensive line and flat ground affording superb fields of fire for dug-in automatic weapons accounted in large measure for the more difficult fighting.

Elsewhere, local engagements sometimes were vicious and costly but usually were short-lived. Anti-personnel and anti-tank mines abounded. German artillery fire seldom was more than moderate and in most cases could better be classified as light or sporadic. That was attributable in part to a campaign of interdiction for several days preceding the attack by planes of the XII Tactical Air Command (Brig. Gen. Glenn O. Barcus) and by D-day strikes by both the fighter-bombers and the mediums and heavies of the 8th Air Force. The latter hit Siegfried Line fortifications and industrial targets in cities such as Zweibrücken and Kaiserslautern. The weather was clear, enabling the aircraft to strike at a variety of targets, limited only by range and bomb-carrying capacity. Among the German casualties were the operations officers of two of the three XC Korps divisions.

Of the units of the outsized (six divisions) XV Corps, only a regiment of the 45th Infantry Division (Maj. Gen. Robert T. Frederick) faced a water obstacle at the start. That regiment had to cross the Blies River at a site upstream from where the Blies turns northeast to meander up the Kaiserslautern corridor. Yet even before dawn men of the regiment had penetrated the enemy's main line of defense beyond the river. Aided by searchlights, they bypassed strongpoints, leaving them for reserves to take out later. As night came, the 45th Division had driven almost 5 km (3.1 mi) beyond the Blies to match a rate of advance that was general everywhere except in the pillbox belt near Saarbrücken and on the flatlands near the Rhine.

On the right wing of the XV Corps, men of the 100th Infantry Division (Maj. Gen. Withers A. Burress) drove quickly to the outskirts of the fortress town of Bitche. Perhaps aided by the fact that they had done the same job before in December, they gained dominating positions on the fortified hills around the town, leaving no doubt that they would clear the entire objective in short order the next day, 16 March.

The only counterattack to cause appreciable concern hit a battalion of the 3rd Division′s 7th Infantry. Veterans of combat from the North African campaign onward, the regiments of the 3rd Division (Maj. Gen. John W. O'Daniel) were making the main effort in the center of the XV Corps in the direction of Zweibrücken and the Kaiserslautern corridor. Although a company of supporting tanks ran into a dense minefield, disabling four tanks and stopping the others, a battalion of the 7th Infantry fought its way into the village of Uttweiler, just across the German frontier. Then an infantry battalion from the 17. SS Panzergrenadierdivision, supported by nine assault guns, struck back. The Germans quickly isolated the American infantrymen but could not force them from the village. Supported by a platoon of tank destroyers and the regimental antitank company organized as a bazooka brigade, another of the 7th Infantry's battalions counterattacked. The men knocked out four multiple-barrel 20 mm (0.79 in) FlaKwagens and seven assault guns and freed the besieged battalion.

On the Seventh Army's right wing, pointed toward the Wissembourg Gap, divisions of Brooks's VI Corps experienced, with the exception of the 3rd Algerian Division, much the same type of opposition. Although all four attacking divisions had to overcome the initial obstacle of a river, either the Moder or a tributary, they accomplished the job quickly with predawn assaults. The Germans were too thinly stretched to do more than man a series of strongpoints. On the corps left wing, the 42nd Infantry Division (Maj. Gen. Harry J. Collins) overcame the added obstacle of attacking along the spine of the Lower Vosges by avoiding the roads and villages in the valleys and following the crests of the high ground. Pack mules—already proved in earlier fighting in the High Vosges—provided the means of supply.

As with the 3rd Division, a battalion of the 103rd Infantry Division (Maj. Gen. Anthony C. McAuliffe) ran into a counterattack, but the reaction it prompted was more precautionary than forced. Having entered Uttenhoffen, northwest of Hagenau, the battalion encountered such intense small arms fire and shelling from self-propelled guns that the regimental commander authorized withdrawal. When German infantry soon after nightfall counterattacked with support from four self-propelled pieces, the battalion pulled back another few hundred yards to better positions on the edge of a copse.

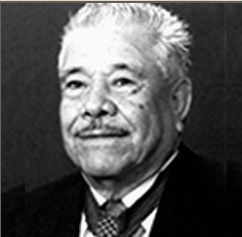
142d Infantry rifleman Pfc. Silvestre S. Herrera, Medal of Honor recipient

In the sector of the 36th Infantry Division (Maj. Gen. John E. Dahlquist), the day's fighting produced a heroic performance by a rifleman of the 142d Infantry, Pfc. Silvestre S. Herrera. After making a one-man charge that carried a German strongpoint and took eight prisoners, Herrera and his platoon were pinned down by fire from a second position protected by a minefield. Disregarding the mines, Herrera also charged this position but stepped on a mine and lost both feet. Even that failed to check him. He brought the enemy under such accurate rifle fire that others of his platoon were able to bypass the minefield and take the Germans in flank.

The 3d Algerian Division meanwhile got across the Moder with little enough trouble but then encountered intense house-to-house fighting. Despite good artillery support made possible by the unlimited visibility of a clear day, grazing fire from automatic weapons prevented the Algerians from crossing a stretch of open ground facing the buildings of a former French Army frontier post. A welter of mines and two counterattacks, the latter repulsed in both cases by artillery fire, added to the problems. As night fell, no Algerian unit had advanced more than 1.6 kilometres.

On the second day, 16 March, indications that the Germans were fighting no more than a delaying action increased everywhere except, again, on the two flanks. It seemed particularly apparent in the zone of the XV Corps, where all three attacking divisions improved on their first day's gains. Mines, demolitions, and strongpoints usually protected by a tank or an assault gun were the main obstacles. By nightfall, both the 3rd and 45th Divisions were well across the German frontier, scarcely more than a stone's throw from the outposts of the Siegfried Line, and the 100th Division, relieved at Bitche by a follow-up infantry division, had begun to come abreast. Fighter-bombers of the XII Tactical Air Command again were out in force.

Even though the Germans appeared to be falling back by design, in reality they intended a deliberate defense. Although corps commanders had begged to be allowed to withdraw into the Siegfried Line even before the American offensive began, General Foertsch at 1. Armee and General Hausser at Army Group G had been impelled to deny the entreaties. The new Commander-in-Chief West—Generalfeldmarschall Albert Kesselring—remained as faithful as his predecessor to the Hitler-imposed maxim of no withdrawal anywhere unless forced.

As events developed, no formal order to pull back into the fortifications ever emerged above corps level. Beginning the night of 16 March, commanders facing the U.S. XV Corps simply did the obvious, ordering their units to seek refuge in the Siegfried Line whenever American pressure grew so great that withdrawal or annihilation became the only alternatives. The next day, commanders facing the U.S. VI Corps adopted the same procedure.

It became at that point as much a matter of logistics as of actual fighting before all divisions of the Seventh Army would be battling to break the concrete barrier into the Saar-Palatinate; but as more than one German commander noted with genuine concern, whether any real fight would develop for the Siegfried Line was not necessarily his to determine. That responsibility fell to those units, decimated and increasingly demoralized, which were opposing the onrush of U.S. Third Army troops from west and northwest into the German rear.

== Breakthrough ==
As the breakthrough of Walker's XX Corps developed in the direction of Kaiserslautern, concern had mounted in the 1. Armee lest those units in the Siegfried Line around Saarbrücken and Zweibrücken be trapped. Once Kaiserslautern fell, the only routes of withdrawal left to those troops led through the Haardt Mountains south of Kaiserslautern. Covered by a dense wood, the Pfaelzer Forest, the region was crossed literally by only one main highway, by a secondary highway close behind the Siegfried Line, and by a few minor roads and trails. The natural difficulties posed by these twisting, poorly surfaced routes already had been heightened by a mass of wrecked vehicles as American fighter pilots relentlessly preyed on hapless targets.

Using the authority granted by Kesselring on 17 March to pull back units threatened with encirclement, the 1. Armee′s Foertsch authorized withdrawal by stages of his westernmost troops, those of Knieß′ LXXXV Korps. Over a period of three days, units of the corps were to peel back from west to east, redeploying to block the main highway leading northeast through the Kaiserslautern Gap.

Unfortunately for Foertsch's plan, the principal threat to the Kaiserslautern Gap came not from west or southwest but from northwest where Walker's XX Corps was pouring unchecked through General Walther Hahm's LXXXII Korps. The 10th Armored Division′s arrival at Kaiserslautern itself on 20 March meant not only that the gap was compromised by a force well in the rear of Knieß′' formations but also that the only way out for both Knieß′ troops and those of the adjacent XIII SS Korps was through the Pfaelzer Forest.

As Knieß′ withdrawal progressed, it had the effect of opening a path through the Siegfried Line for the left wing of the U.S. Seventh Army. Despite a stubborn rear guard, the 63rd Division of Milburn's XXI Corps broke through the main belt of fortifications near St. Ingbert late on 19 March. Had events moved according to plan, Milburn then would have sent an armored column northward to link with Walker's XX Corps near St. Wendel; but so swift had been the advance of Walker's troops that all worthwhile objectives in Milburn's sector beyond the Siegfried Line already had fallen. Milburn and his XXI Corps had achieved a penetration but had no place to go.

Patch seized on the situation to provide a boost for his army's main effort, the attack of the XV Corps through Zweibrücken toward the Kaiserslautern Gap. In two days of hammering at XIII SS Korps, the divisions of the XV Corps still had opened no hole through the Siegfried Line for armored exploitation. Send a combat command, Patch directed the XV Corps commander, Haislip, to move through the 63rd Division's gap and come in on the rear of the Siegfried Line defenders facing the XV Corps.

That the Americans would exploit the withdrawal was too obvious to escape the 1. Armee commander, Foertsch. During the night of the 19th, he extended the authority to withdraw to the west wing of the XIII SS Korps. Thus, hardly had the American combat command begun to move early on 20 March to exploit the 63rd Division's penetration when the 45th Division of the XV Corps also advanced past the last pillboxes of the Siegfried Line near Zweibrücken. During the night of the 20th, the rest of the SS korps also began to pull back, and the momentum of the 3rd Division's advance picked up accordingly.

The German problem was to get the survivors of both the LXXXV Korps and the XIII SS Korps through the Pfaelzer Forest despite three dire threats: one from the closely following troops of the U.S. Seventh Army; another from the 10th Armored Division of Walker's XX Corps, which at Kaiserslautern was in a position to swing south and southeast through the Pfaelzer Forest and cut the escape routes; and a third from the fighter bombers of the XII Tactical Air Command.

It was the last that was most apparent to the rank and file of the retreating Germans. Since speed was imperative, the men had to move by day as well as by night, virtually inviting attack from the air. Since almost everybody, including the troops of the motorized 17. SS Panzergrenadierdivision, had to use either the main east–west highway through the forest or the secondary road close behind the Siegfried Line, American fighter pilots had only to aim their bombs, their cannon, and their machine guns in the general direction of those roads to be assured of hitting some target. An acute gasoline shortage added to the German difficulties. Almost every foot of the two roads soon became clogged with abandoned, damaged, or wrecked vehicles, guns, and equipment.

The destruction in the Pfaelzer Forest was in keeping with the pattern almost everywhere. So long a target of both artillery and aircraft, the drab towns and cities in and close to the Siegfried Line were a shambles. "It is difficult to describe the destruction," wrote the 45th Division commander, General Frederick. "Scarcely a man-made thing exists in our wake; it is even difficult to find buildings suitable for CP's: this is the scorched earth." In Zweibrücken, with the entire business district razed, only about 5,000 people of a normal population of 37,000 remained, and they were hiding in cellars and caves. Fires burned uncontrolled, neither water nor fire-fighting equipment available to quench them. No local government existed. Thousands of released slave laborers and German soldiers who had changed into civilian clothes complicated the issue for military government officials. In more than one city, particularly Homburg, looting and pillage were rampant.

Running the gantlet of American fighter aircraft through the Pfaelzer Forest, the amorphous mass of retreating Germans faced still a fourth American threat—Brooks's VI Corps, which had followed closely the German withdrawal from northeastern Alsace and on 19 March had begun to assault the Siegfried Line on either side of Wissembourg. There, Petersen's XC Korps was charged with holding the fortifications and denying access to the flatlands along the Rhine.

In the Seventh Army's original plan, the attached 3rd Algerian Division on the right wing of the VI Corps along the Rhine was to have been pinched out after it reached the Lauter River at the German frontier. The planners had not reckoned with the aspirations of the French and their First Army commander, General Jean de Lattre. Assured of support from the provisional head of the French state, General Charles de Gaulle, de Lattre was determined to acquire a zone along the Rhine north of the Lauter in order to assure a Rhine crossing site for the final drive into Germany.

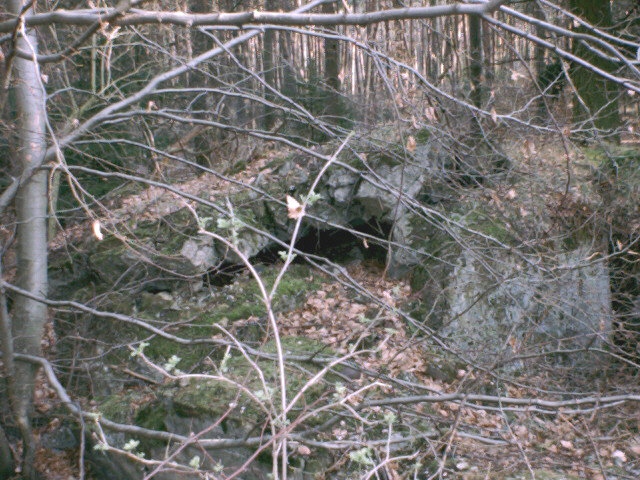
Ruins of a bunker in the Bienwald

As the Algerians matched and sometimes exceeded the strides of the American units of the VI Corps and reached the Lauter along a 10 mi (16 km) front, de Lattre had no difficulty pressing his ambition on the Sixth Army Group commander, Devers. Using the 3rd Algerian Division and a combat group from the 5th French Armored Division, again to be attached to the VI Corps, the French (organized as Task Force (Groupement) de Monsabert) were to continue northward some 19 km (12 mi) beyond the Lauter River, thereby gaining limited Rhine River frontage inside Germany. The subsequent French advance pushed through the Bienwald, a large forested expanse just north of the Lauter through which bunkers, trenches, and other obstacles of the Siegfried Line were emplaced. In the ensuing clash, elements of the German 257th Volksgrenadier and 905th Infantry Training Divisions were forced to retreat northward in fighting dominated by the forested terrain.

The adjustment meant that the Siegfried Line assault by the four American divisions of the VI Corps was to be concentrated in a zone less than 32 km (20 mi) wide. Since the German XC Korps had only the remnants of two volksgrenadier divisions and an infantry training division to defend against both Americans and French, a breakthrough of the fortifications was but a matter of time. Yet just as had been the case in the zones of the XXI Corps and the XV Corps, it was less the hard fighting of the VI Corps that would determine when the Siegfried Line would be pierced than it was the rampaging thrusts of the Third Army's XX Corps in the German rear.

The divisions of the VI Corps had been probing the pillbox belt less than 24 hours when Walker, leaving the task of gaining the Rhine to the 12th Armored Division and of actually capturing Kaiserslautern to an infantry unit, turned the 10th Armored Division south and southeast into the Pfaelzer Forest. By nightfall of 20 March, two of the 10th Armored's columns stood only a few hundred yards from the main highway through the forest, one almost at the city of Pirmasens on the western edge, the other not far from the eastern edge. A third was nearing Neustadt, farther north beyond the fringe of the forest. The 12th Armored meanwhile was approaching the Rhine near Ludwigshafen. Not only were the withdrawal routes through the Pfaelzer Forest about to be compromised but a swift strike down the Rhine plain from Neustadt and Ludwigshafen against the last escape sites for crossing the Rhine appeared in the offing.

In desperation, on 20 March the Luftwaffe sent approximately 300 planes of various types—including jet-propelled Messerschmitt Me 262—to attack the Third Army's columns, but to little avail. Casualties on the American side were minor. Anti-aircraft units—getting a rare opportunity to do the job for which they were trained—shot down 25 German planes. Pilots of the XIX Tactical Air Command claimed another eight.

In the face of the 10th Armored Division's drive, the word to the westernmost units of the XC Korps to begin falling back went out late on the 20th, and when the 42nd Division—in the mountains on the left wing of the VI Corps—launched a full-scale assault against the Siegfried Line late the next day, the attack struck a vacuum. Soon after dawn the next morning, 22 March, a regiment of the 42nd cut the secondary highway through the Pfaelzer Forest. A column of the 10th Armored had moved astride the main highway through the woods and emerged on the Rhine flatlands at Landau. Any Germans who got out of the forest would have to do so by threading a way off the roads individually or in small groups.

By nightfall of 22 March, the Germans west of the Rhine could measure the time left to them in hours. In the Siegfried Line on either side of Wissembourg, Petersen's XC Korps continued to fight in the pillboxes in a manner that belied the futility of their mission. The 14th Armored Division (Maj. Gen. Albert C. Smith) attacked into the Wissembourg Gap on 20 March and then fought Germans of the XC Corps over the possession of Steinfeld for the next two days. Both at Neustadt and at Landau, remnants of two divisions of the XIII SS Korps, including the 17. SS Panzergrenadierdivision, had held through the day, but early in the evening the defense collapsed. General Franz Beyer's LXXX Korps, transferred from the 7. Armee to plug the hole from the north alongside the Rhine, had hardly anything left to prevent the 12th Armored Division from driving southward from Ludwigshafen toward Speyer. By nightfall of the 22nd, a column of the 12th Armored stood only 10 km (6.2 mi) from Speyer, and on the 23rd, the 14th Armored broke through the Siegfried Line at Steinfeld and began its advance on Germersheim.

To forestall a second Remagen, by 19 March the Germans had blown all Rhine bridges from Ludwigshafen northward. Of three that remained upstream, the southernmost, the Maxau Rhine Bridge at Maximiliansau, was destroyed on 21 March when a round of American artillery fire struck a detonator, setting off prepared demolitions. A second, at Speyer, was too immediately threatened and too far removed from the main body of German troops to be of much use to any but the defenders of Speyer itself. It would be blown late on the 23rd.

Over the remaining bridge, at Germersheim, roughly east of Landau, as many vehicles and field pieces as could be salvaged began to pass during the night of the 22nd. Still no orders for final withdrawal beyond the Rhine came from the Commander-in-Chief West. Headquarters of both the 1. Armee and Army Group G still were west of the river.

Some German officers were beginning to wonder if every last increment of the 1. Armee was to be sacrificed when at last, on 23 March, authorization came to cross the Rhine. While the bridge at Germersheim continued to serve artillery and vehicles, foot troops began to evacuate the west bank at three ferry sites south of the town. A smattering of infantrymen, an occasional tank or assault gun, and a regiment of antiaircraft guns operating against ground targets formed rear guard perimeters west of the ferry sites.

== Conclusion ==
Although all divisions of the U.S. VI Corps achieved clear breakthroughs during 23 March, they came in contact only with rear guards and failed to affect the German evacuation materially. Because a German force in Speyer fought doggedly, contact between the 12th and 14th Armored Divisions was delayed. Both armored divisions early on 24 March sent task forces in quest of the lone remaining Rhine bridge, at Germersheim, but neither had reached the fringes of the town when at 10:20 the Germans blew up the crossing. Formal German evacuation of the west bank ended during the night of the 24th, while American units continued to mop up rear guards and stragglers through 25 March.

It is impossible to ascertain how many Germans escaped from the Saar-Palatinate to fight again on the Rhine's east bank, or how much equipment and matériel they managed to take with them. Yet German losses clearly were severe. "Tremendous losses in both men and matériel," noted the chief of staff of the 1. Armee. The staff of the U.S. Seventh Army estimated that the two German armies had lost 75–80% of their infantry in the Saar-Palatinate fight. The Seventh Army and its attached French units captured 22,000 Germans during the campaign, and the Third Army imprisoned more than 68,000. The Third Army estimated that the German units opposing its advance lost approximately 113,000 men, including prisoners, while the Third Army's casualties totaled 5,220, including 681 killed. The Seventh Army, much of its fighting centered in the Siegfried Line, probably incurred about 12,000 casualties, including almost 1,000 killed.

In view of the success of the campaign, criticism of it would be difficult to sustain. Yet it was a fact nonetheless that the German 1. Armee—and to some extent the 7. Armee—for all the losses, conducted a skillful delaying action to the end in the face of overwhelming strength on the ground and in the air and never succumbed to wholesale encirclement, despite a higher command reluctant to sanction any withdrawal. In the process, the Germans had withstood the clear threat of a rapid drive by some unit of the Third Army or the Seventh Army along the west bank of the Rhine to trap the 1. Armee. In preserving their forces, however, the Germans had to surrender the important industrial area around Saarbrücken as well as the readily defensible terrain of the Pfaelzer Forest.

== Order of battle (northwest to southeast) ==
=== United States ===
- U.S. Third Army (General George S. Patton)
  - VIII Corps (Lt. Gen. Troy H. Middleton)
  - XII Corps (Maj. Gen. Manton S. Eddy)
  - XX Corps (Maj. Gen. Walton Walker)
- U.S. Seventh Army (Lt. General Alexander Patch)
  - XXI Corps (Maj. Gen. Frank W. Milburn)
  - XV Corps (Maj. Gen. Wade H. Haislip)
  - VI Corps (Maj. Gen. Edward H. Brooks)
  - 3rd Algerian Infantry Division (Général Augustin Guillaume)

=== Germany ===
- 7. Armee (General der Infanterie Hans Felber)
  - LXXXIX Korps (General der Infanterie Gustav Höhne)
  - XIII Korps (Generalleutnant Ralph Graf von Oriola)
  - LXXX Korps (General der Infanterie Franz Beyer)
- 1. Armee (General der Infanterie Hermann Foertsch)
  - LXXXII Korps (General der Infanterie Walther Hahm)
  - LXXXV Korps (General der Infanterie Baptist Knieß)
  - XIII SS Korps (SS-Gruppenführer und Generalleutnant der Waffen-SS Max Simon)
  - XC Korps (General der Flieger Erich Petersen).
