= Semantic Visions =

Czech open-source intelligence and data-analytics company

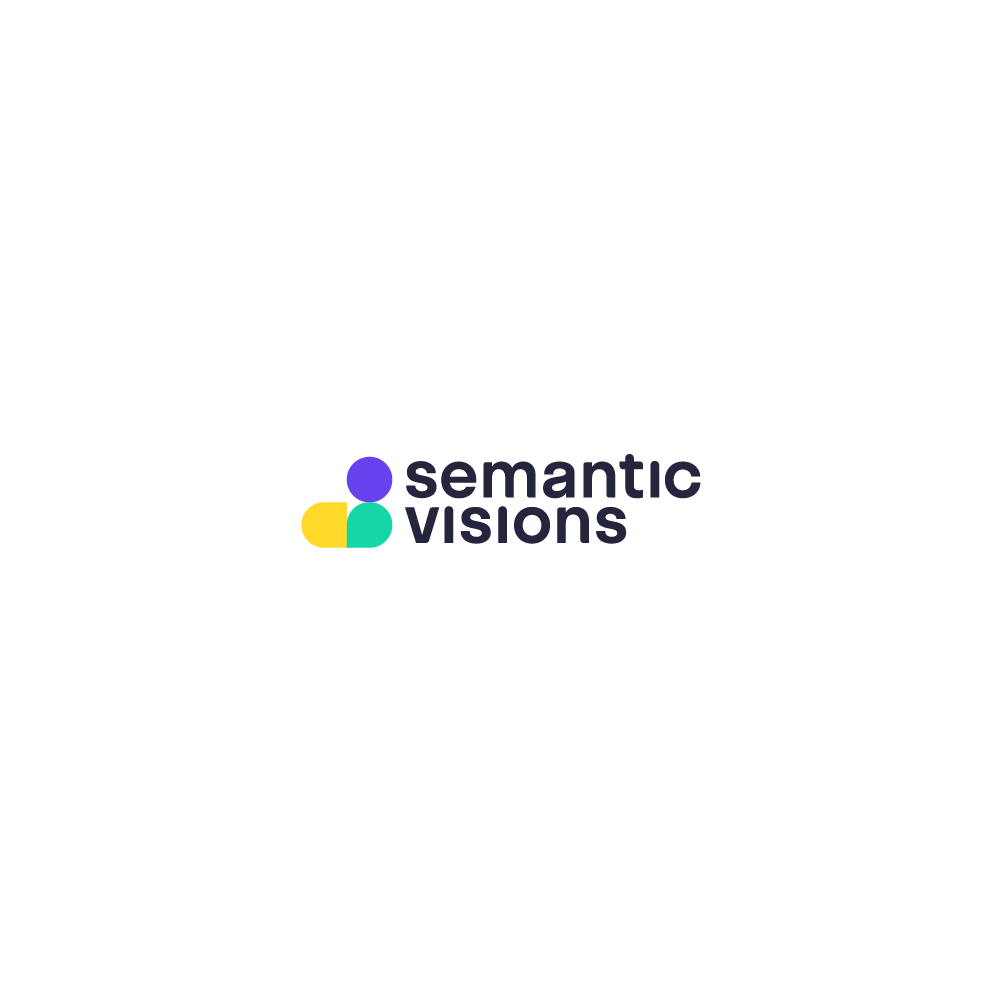
- Type: Private (limited liability company)
- Industry: Data analytics; OSINT; Risk detection
- Founded: 2011
- Founder: František Vrábel
- Headquarters: Prague, Czech Republic
- Key people: Jan Balatka (Managing Director); Diana Rádl Rogerová (Executive/Partner)
- Products: svEye platform
- Services: Media and risk analytics; supply-chain risk monitoring; adverse media & brand monitoring; compliance & governance monitoring
- Owner: Behind Investments (100%)
- Website: www.semantic-visions.com

Semantic Visions is a Prague-based Czech open-source intelligence (OSINT) and data-analytics company that analyzes online media to surface early-warning signals about risk and emerging trends for corporate and public-sector clients.

The company's system applies automated language technologies alongside multilingual analysis to structure news and other open data into entities, events and relationships, with typical uses including supply-chain risk monitoring, ESG and compliance-oriented media monitoring, and the tracking of online disinformation narratives.

The platform converts unstructured, multilingual reporting into structured indicators for real-time monitoring and historical context, supporting applications such as operational resilience, third-party due diligence and the study of information operations.

== History ==
Semantic Visions was founded in 2011 by data analyst František Vrábel, building on prior work in semantic analysis and multilingual media monitoring. In March 2019 the company was named a winner of the joint US–UK Tech Challenge to Combat Disinformation, securing $250,000 to advance tools for detecting online propaganda.

During the COVID-19 period and around Russia’s 2022 invasion of Ukraine, the firm’s analysis of emerging narratives and misinformation was cited by Czech and international outlets, including reporting on disinformation resonance in Eastern Europe.

In the 2020s the company’s leadership broadened beyond the founder; Jan Balatka became managing director, with investment support directed toward ESG-oriented analytics. In 2025 the investor group Behind Inventions (via its subsidiary Behind Investments) announced the acquisition of 100% of Semantic Visions, with Pale Fire Capital exiting as a prior shareholder.

== Technology ==
Semantic Visions’ platform is a large-scale OSINT pipeline that continuously ingests online media across languages and domains, then structures it into entities, events and relationships using natural-language processing with human-in-the-loop linguistics to refine multilingual accuracy. The system processes over one million articles per day from roughly 220,000 sources in 12 languages.

Event-type taxonomies are applied to the stream to surface “weak signals” tied to companies, commodities and locations—enabling early indications of operational, ESG and supply-chain–relevant developments. Output is delivered as structured data suitable for real-time monitoring as well as historical analysis, with emphasis on linking extracted events to affected entities for downstream analytics.

== Products ==
The company’s core risk-intelligence platform, marketed as svEye, aggregates open-source media and analytics to deliver alerts, dashboards and historical context for monitoring. The platform links events to entities using NLP/knowledge-graph methods and can be integrated via API for real-time use in client workflows.

In 2024 the company introduced a media-based ESG Index, which applies its underlying multilingual pipeline and event taxonomies to global news in order to track ESG-relevant event types at the company level for sustainability assessment and benchmarking. The Index extends the platform’s OSINT processing to surface ESG-related developments relevant for corporate and supply-chain evaluation.

== Applications ==
Industry and public-sector coverage attributes the following reported uses to Semantic Visions’ platform:

- Supply-chain and logistics risk monitoring. Used for tracking incidents that can disrupt maritime and overland flows, with outputs framed around alerts and dashboards used by operators and shippers. Reported capabilities include mapping from local incidents to affected facilities/companies for operational awareness.
- Multi-tier supplier visibility (forwarding & logistics). Applied to identify risks beyond the first tier—e.g., events affecting upstream suppliers or critical nodes that matter to freight forwarders and their customers—supporting earlier detection and mitigation.
- ESG/sustainability event tracking for corporates and forwarders. Used to surface ESG-relevant developments at the company level (e.g., incidents, controversies) pulled from global media, informing sustainability assessment and benchmarking in transport and logistics.
- Monitoring online disinformation and propaganda. Involves detecting and analyzing narratives tied to geopolitical events and malign influence campaigns, including recognition via the US–UK Tech Challenge to Combat Disinformation.

== Ownership and leadership ==
Pale Fire Capital was a long-term shareholder in Semantic Visions prior to exit. In 2025, Behind Inventions (via its subsidiary Behind Investments) announced the acquisition of 100% of Semantic Visions; Pale Fire Capital described this as its exit from the company. Leadership figures include founder František Vrábel and managing director Jan Balatka.

== Recognition ==
In 2019, Semantic Visions was selected as a winner of the US–UK Tech Challenge to Combat Disinformation, an initiative highlighted by the UK government. The company’s risk-analytics work in supply chain and logistics has been profiled in specialist trade outlets, including its media-based ESG Index for sustainability assessment and broader applications of AI-driven analysis in maritime and logistics contexts.

== See also ==
- Open-source intelligence
- Supply chain risk management
