= Risk intelligence =

Risk intelligence is a concept that generally means "beyond risk management", though it has been used in different ways by different writers. The term is being used more frequently by business strategists when discussing integrative business processes related to governance, risk, and compliance.

== Definitions ==
The first non-definitive usage of the phrase "risk intelligence" appears in the 1980s and aligns to the definition of intelligence as being information from an enemy (for example, regarding credit risk.) The topic of balancing risk and innovation using information and the cognitive processes involved also appears at this time. Recent usage is more aligned to intelligence as understanding and problem solving.

The US business writer David Apgar defines it as the capacity to learn about risk from experience.

Deloitte Risk Advisory partner (since retired) Stephen Wagner, along with former Deloitte partner and current management consultant and risk advisor Rick Funston, defined risk intelligence as a dynamic approach to protect and create value amid uncertainty. It is an enterprise wide process integrating people, processes (systems), and tools to increase information available to decision makers for improved decision making.

The UK philosopher and psychologist Dylan Evans defines it as "a special kind of intelligence for thinking about risk and uncertainty", at the core of which is the ability to estimate probabilities accurately. Evans includes a risk intelligence test (RQ) in his book and on his website (below) analogous to IQ or EQ.

Computer scientist and risk researcher Jochen L. Leidner distinguishes three types of risk (risk type, likelihood and impact; the latter has also been called loss if expressed in negative financial terms); risk intelligence then is the process of obtaining these three pieces of information for any risk type an entity has non-trivial exposure. Risk intelligence can be obtained manually or with computer support.

American financial executive, author, and Columbia University professor Leo Tilman defined risk intelligence as "The organizational ability to think holistically about risk and uncertainty, speak a common risk language, and effectively use forward-looking risk concepts and tools in making better decisions, alleviating threats, capitalizing on opportunities, and creating lasting value." He has argued that risk intelligence is essential to survival, success, and relevance of companies and investors in the post-crisis world. In this latest book Agility: How to Navigate the Unknown and Seize Opportunity in a World of Disruption (2019, co-authored with General Charles H. Jacoby Jr.), Tilman describes risk intelligence as a cornerstone of organizational agility.

== Comparison with business intelligence ==
As an emerging concept, risk intelligence shares characteristics with other topics such as business intelligence and competitive intelligence. As such, there are some in those camps who believe that risk intelligence is the set of processes for the transformation of risk data into meaningful and useful information for risk analysis, treatment and planning purposes.

== See also ==
- Risk management
- Business intelligence
