= Wissembourg Gap =

Coordinates: 49°02′24″N 07°58′12″E

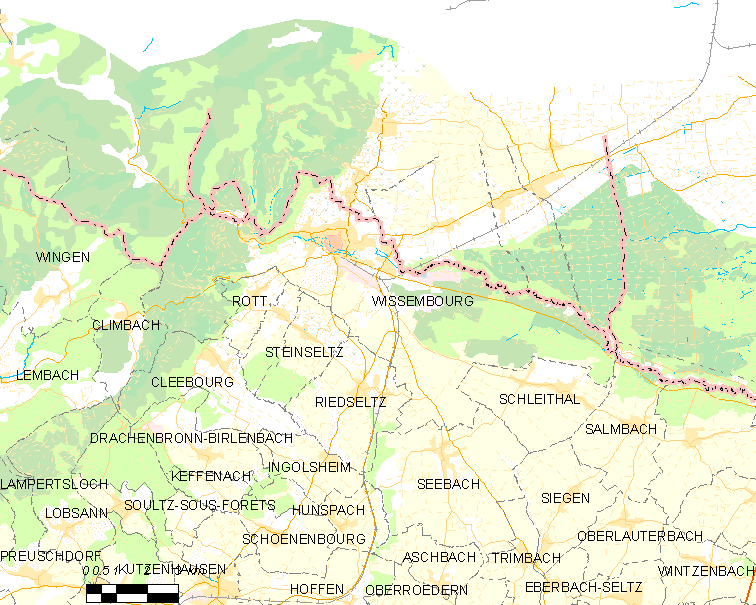
The Wissembourg Gap, with the Pfälzerwald and Bienwald marked in green

The Wissembourg Gap (French: trouée de Wissembourg, German: Weißenburger Senke) is a corridor of open terrain, approximately six kilometres (3.7 miles) wide, between the hills of the Palatinate Forest to the west and the Bienwald forest (and beyond that the Upper Rhine) to the east. It marks the border between the Palatinate to the north and Alsace to the south, and by extension between Germany and France. The Gap is dominated by the French town of Wissembourg, from which it takes its name. The average altitude of the land in the corridor rises from 150 metres by the Bienwald to 250 metres by the Palatinate Forest.

Because of the Wissembourg Gap's position on the Franco-German border, it has frequently been a favoured route for military invasions, notably during the War of the Austrian Succession, the French Revolutionary Wars, the Franco-Prussian War, and the Second World War.

== History ==
In the mediaeval period the Wissembourg Gap was an internal border within the Holy Roman Empire, marking the boundary between the County Palatine of the Rhine to the north and the Alsatian Décapole (German: Zehnstädtebund), a federation of ten cities including Wissembourg, to the south. Under the 1679 Treaties of Nijmegen the Décapole was annexed by Louis XIV of France, and the Wissembourg Gap therefore became an international border between the Holy Roman Empire and the Kingdom of France.

During the War of the Spanish Succession, it was feared that the Grand Alliance (principally England, the Dutch Republic and the Habsburg monarchy) might attempt to invade France through the Wissembourg Gap, and so in 1706 Marshal Villars established a series of fortifications, the “Lines of Wissembourg” (French: Lignes de Wissembourg, German: Weißenburger Linien) across the Gap. These fortifications were later extended to the Rhine at Lauterbourg, nine miles to the southeast.

Despite the presence of the Lines, an Austrian army under Prince Charles Alexander of Lorraine succeeded in forcing its way through the Wissembourg Gap and into Alsace in 1744, during the War of the Austrian Succession.

The Austrians made another attempt to invade France through the Wissembourg Gap in 1793, during the French Revolutionary Wars. In October of that year the Count of Wurmser defeated the French army guarding the border at the First Battle of Wissembourg and marched his forces south into Alsace, but in December he was defeated by General Pichegru at the Second Battle of Wissembourg and forced to retreat into the Palatinate.

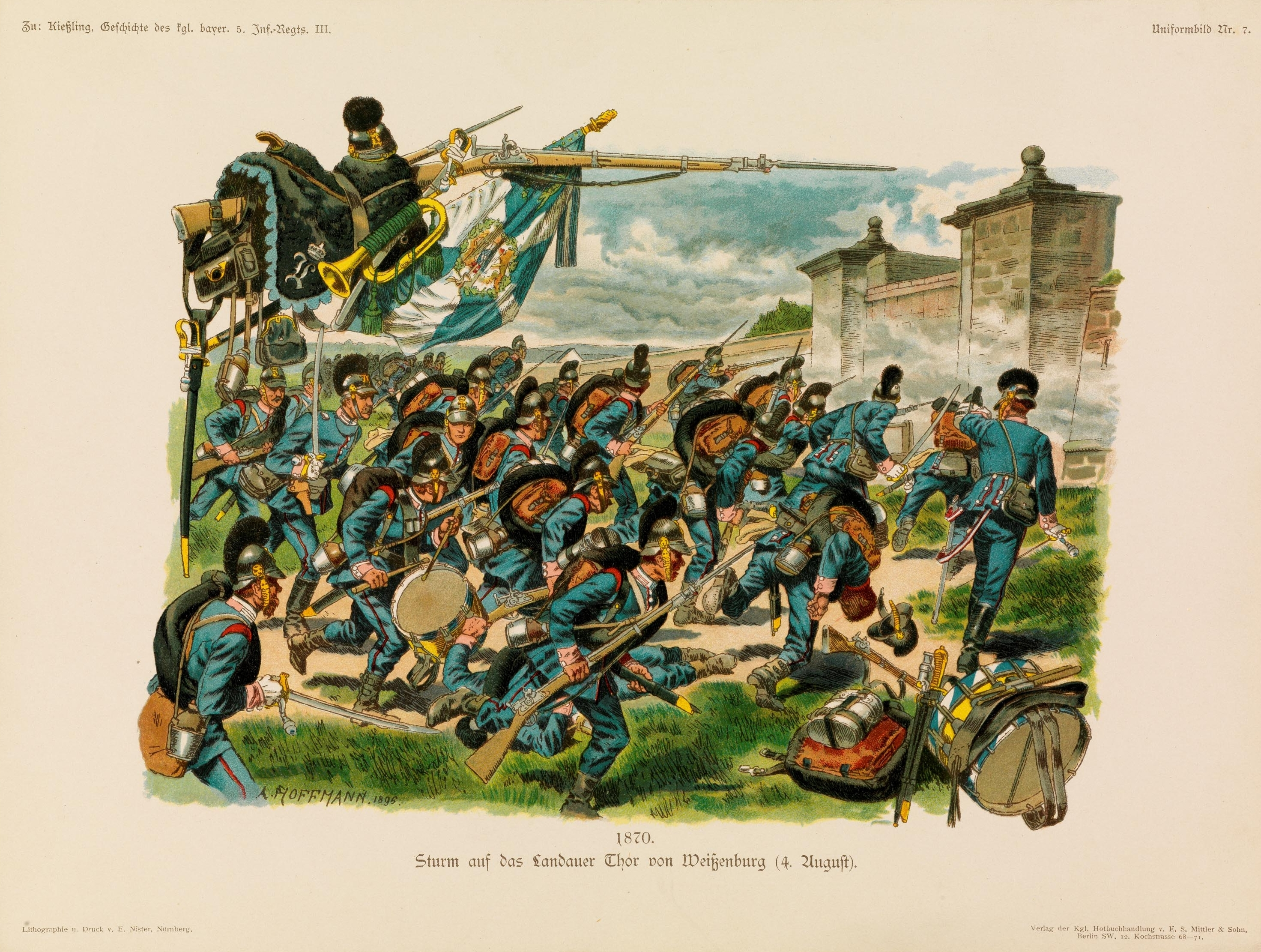
Troops of the 4th Royal Bavarian Division at the 1870 Battle of Wissembourg.

The Wissembourg Gap was the route selected for the Prussian invasion of France in the Franco-Prussian War. Indeed, the resulting third Battle of Wissembourg (1870), which took place on 4 August 1870, was the first major engagement of the war. The Prussians and their Bavarian and Swabian allies were nominally commanded by Crown Prince Frederick, but their movements were in practice directed by his chief of staff, General Leonhard Graf von Blumenthal. The battle was a victory for the Prussians, enabling their forces to pour into France through the Wissembourg Gap, and the invasion of France culminated a month later with the decisive Battle of Sedan and the collapse of the Second French Empire. The Geisberg monument commemorates the Battle of Wissembourg, and the town cemetery in Wissembourg holds large numbers of soldiers, including the stately tomb of French general Abel Douay who was killed in combat.

As a result of the Franco-Prussian War, France was obliged to cede Alsace and Lorraine to the new German Empire, and the Wissembourg Gap therefore ceased to be an international border and became an internal boundary within Germany. As such it did not see any military action during the First World War.

The Treaty of Versailles returned Alsace to France, and restored the Wissembourg Gap's status as an international border. In the Second World War, the Gap became the scene of significant operations in spring 1945, when Allied forces advanced through it into Germany as part of the Operation Undertone offensive. The formation which led the push through the Gap was the American VI Corps, commanded by General Edward H. Brooks.
