= Bienwald =

Forest in southwestern Germany

Coordinates: 49°01′44″N 08°08′38″E

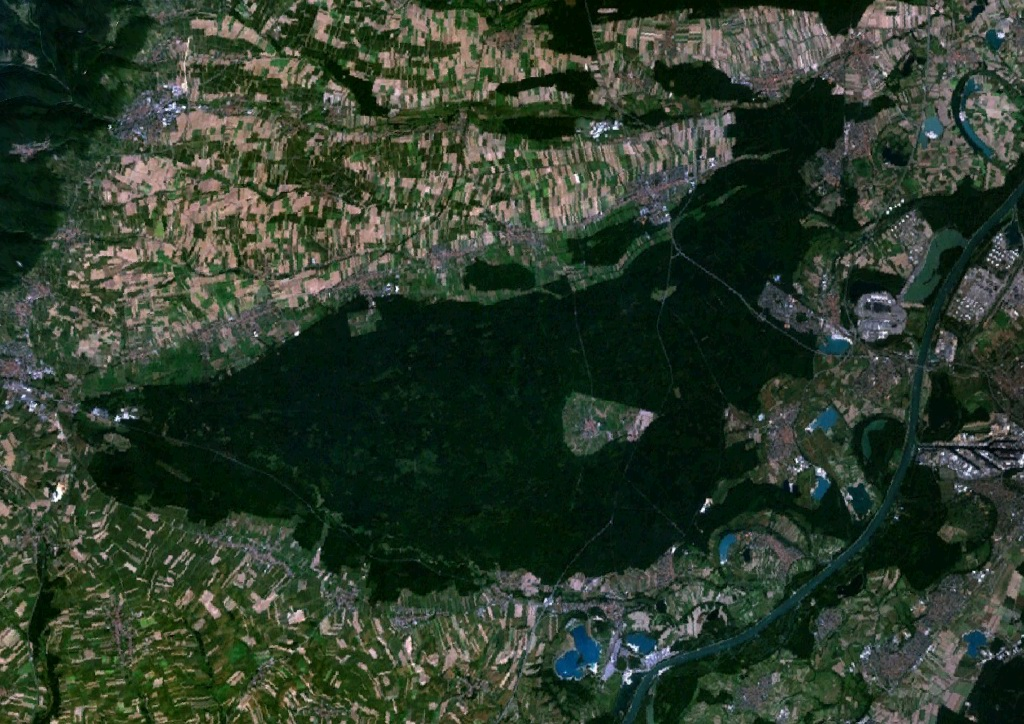
The Bienwald as seen from space.

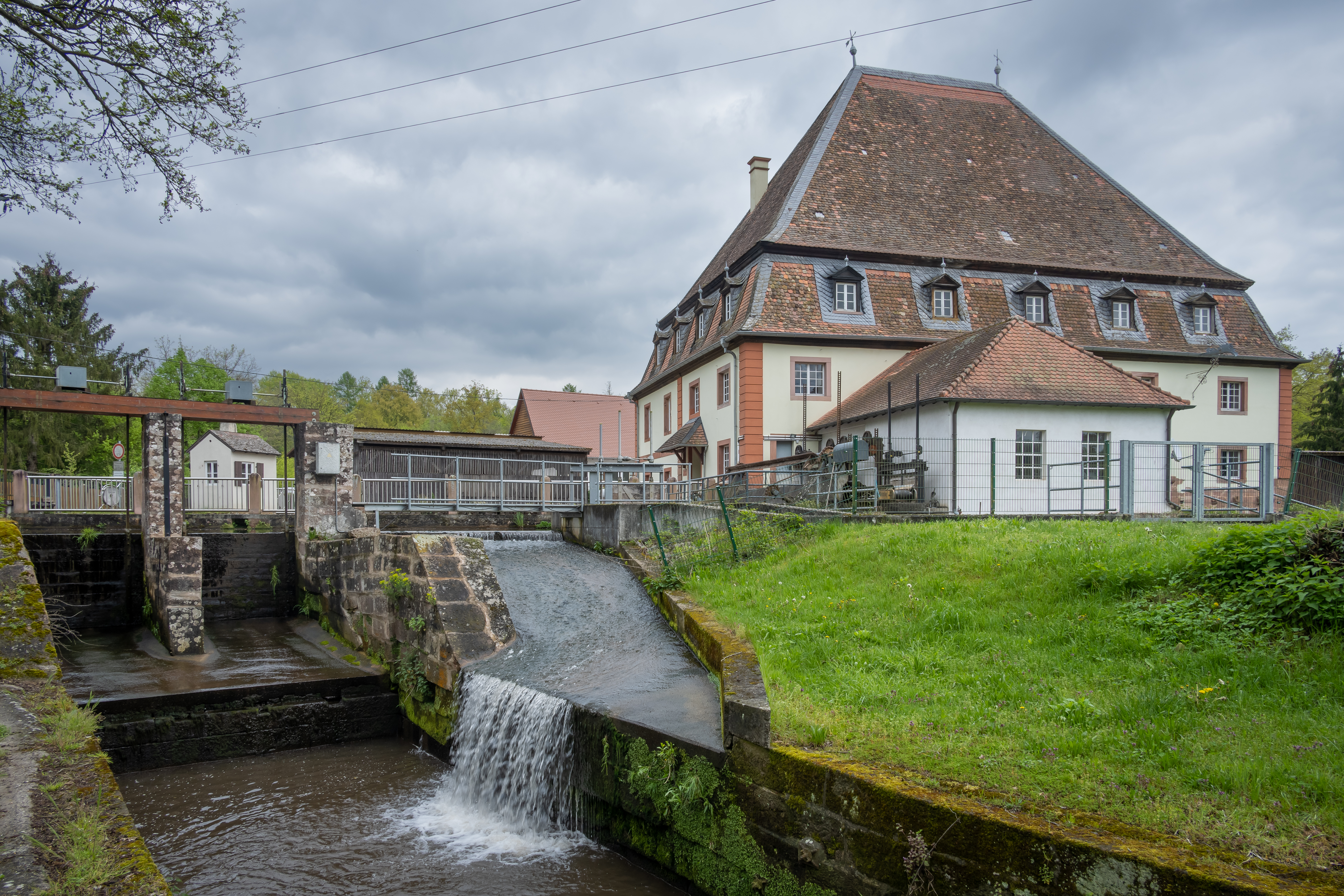
Bienwald mill

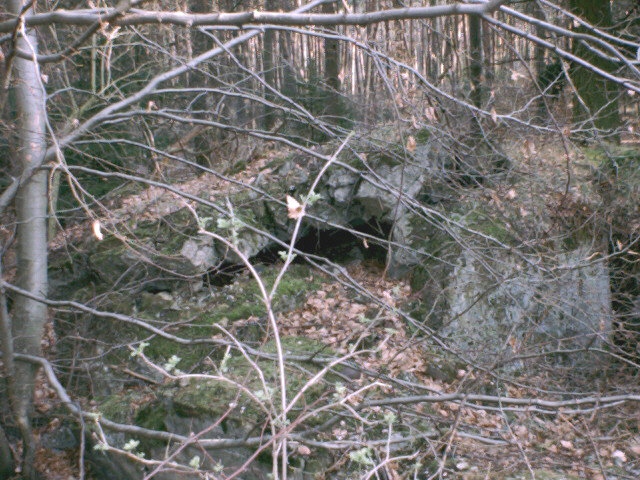
Ruins of a German bunker in the Bienwald. A Beech tree stands to the left.

The Bienwald is a large forested area in the southern Pfalz region of Germany near the towns of Kandel and Wörth am Rhein. The western edge defines the eastern extent of the Wissembourg Gap, a corridor of open terrain between the Bienwald and the hills of the Palatine Forest. In the northwest, the forest is bounded by the so-called "Cattle Line" (German: Viehstrich), running from Schweighofen to Kandel. In the north, the forest reaches as far as Hatzenbühl and Rheinzabern. The eastern boundary largely runs along the bank of the Rhine from Jockgrim to Hagenbach and Berg (Pfalz). The southern boundary follows the valley of the Lauter along the border of France and Germany. The bulk of the forest belongs to the municipality of Wörth am Rhein. At its greatest extent, the Bienwald is approximately 17 kilometres (11 mi) wide along its east–west axis and 11 km (6.8 mi) from north to south. The forest has an area of some 163 km^{2} (63 sq mi). Approximately one-third of the forest is deciduous woodland with the remainder coniferous. The forest has an elevation of 100 metres (330 ft) above sea level by the Rhine, and rises to 150 m (490 ft) above sea level in its western extremities.

The only settlement in the Bienwald is Büchelberg (940 inhabitants as of 2015), which lies inside a clearing in the forest and is administratively part of the town of Wörth am Rhein.

On 13 August 1793, a battle of the War of the First Coalition took place in the Bienwald. Austrian troops under Marshal Dagobert Sigmund von Wurmser pushed the French Army back and frustrated the relief of Mainz. In March 1945, during World War II, the U.S. VI Corps and the French First Army assaulted German Siegfried Line fortifications in the Bienwald and penetrated German defenses in the forest during a week of heavy combat. The forest is still marked by trenches and bunker ruins from World War II. There are also older French earthworks (redoutes) in the southwestern parts of the forest where it borders the Lauter river and Mundat Forest (French: Forêt du Mundat).

The proposed construction of a multi-lane controlled access highway through the forest is disputed. The proposed road would connect the French A35 autoroute and the German A65 autobahn.

European wildcats have taken up residence in the Bienwald in the last few years, often using the ruins of destroyed bunkers for shelter.
