= Shadow Dragon (aircraft) =

Chinese hypersonic aircraft project

Shadow Dragon is a project to develop a hypersonic spaceplane for China.

== See also ==
- Supersonic transport
