= ZeroFox =

External cybersecurity company based in Baltimore, Maryland, United States

ZeroFox Holdings, Inc.
- Type: Private company
- Traded as: Nasdaq: ZFOX
- ISIN: US98955G1031
- Industry: External Cybersecurity; Brand Protection
- Founded: 2013; 13 years ago
- Founders: James C. Foster; Evan L. Blair
- Headquarters: Baltimore, Maryland
- Number of locations: 3
- Owner: Haveli Investments; (2024–present)
- Website: www.zerofox.com

ZeroFox Holdings, Inc. is an American external cybersecurity company based in Baltimore, Maryland. It provides cloud-based software as a service (SaaS) for organizations to expose and disrupt phishing and fraud campaigns, botnet exposures, credential theft, impersonations, data breaches, and physical threats that target brands, domains, people, and assets.

== History ==
ZeroFox was created in 2013 under the name Riskive, but changed to its current name months later. The company began as a startup inside Betamore, a startup incubator in Baltimore's Federal Hill neighborhood.

In 2015, ZeroFox raised $27 million in Series B funding. By 2016, the company moved to s former Pabst Brewing facility in South Baltimore. In 2017, ZeroFox raised $40 million in funding led by Redline Capital Management, a European venture firm, and Silver Lake Waterman, a fund that focuses on pre-IPO companies. Prior investors New Enterprise Associates, Highland Capital Partners and Core Capital also contributed. The investment helped bring ZeroFox's total funding to $88 million.

The company faced criticism over its handling of the 2015 protests over the death of Freddie Gray when it singled out nonviolent organizers. ZeroFox labeled DeRay Mckesson and Johnetta Elzie as high physical threats to law enforcement despite not being suspected of any criminal activity. ZeroFox was unsuccessful at differentiating between impersonating troll accounts and Elzie's actual social media presence.

In 2020, ZeroFox closed a new $74 million round of financing led by Intel Capital.

ZeroFox signed a $14 million social media intelligence contract with the FBI on Dec 30, 2020, taking over from Dataminr, which held the contract until Dec. 31, 2020. This transition period led to decreased visibility leading up to the 2021 United States Capitol attack, and drew derision from agents.

The company went public on August 4, 2022, through a $1.4B SPAC deal. In the deal, ZeroFox also acquired ID Experts Holdings, Inc. (“IDX”). The combined company was then called ZeroFox Holdings, Inc. and traded on the Nasdaq Stock Market under the ticker symbol "ZFOX" for its common stock and "ZFOXW" for its publicly traded warrants. In 2024, ZeroFox was acquired by private equity firm Haveli Investments for approximately $350 million.

In 2023, ZeroFox announced a partnership with Google Cloud to warn users against phishing domains.

In July 2026, United States Immigration and Customs Enforcement contracted with ZeroFox for software to support ICE operations and to detect online information online that could identify ICE employees.

=== Acquisitions ===
- In October 2020, ZeroFox acquired Cyveillance from LookingGlass in a move designed to merge Cyveillance's threat intelligence data cache and dark web intelligence capabilities with the ZeroFox Digital Risk Protection Platform.
- In July 2021, the company acquired Vigilante, a dark web threat intelligence company.
- In August 2022, the company acquired IDX, a breach response company.
- In April 2023, the company acquired LookingGlass Cyber Solutions, an external attack surface management and threat intelligence company.
- In November 2024, ZeroFox divested its IDX subsidiary to Kingswood Capital Management.
