= Geofeedia =

Geofeedia is a social media intelligence platform that associates social media posts with geographic locations. It has offices in Chicago, Illinois; Naples, Florida; and Indianapolis, Indiana.

== History ==
Geofeedia has received an undisclosed amount of money from In-Q-Tel, an investment operation of the U.S. Central Intelligence Agency. The company raised $3.5 million in their second round of venture capital in October 2014. At the time, major clients included the Los Angeles County Sheriff's Department and Dell. Clients could visualize posts in an area in realtime and analyze the contents. Services mined by Geofeedia include Instagram, Twitter, Periscope, Vine, YouTube, and Sina Weibo. The company raised $17 million in Series B funding in early 2016 from Silversmith Capital Partners and reported 250% revenue growth in 2015 with clients including Mall of America and the NCAA. In 2016, 60 people worked for the company.

== Controversy ==
In October 2016, the American Civil Liberties Union published a report that the company's technologies were used to identify and arrest protestors in events such as the 2015 Baltimore protests that followed the death of Freddie Gray. Facebook, Instagram, and Twitter, who were named in the report, restricted Geofeedia's access to user data as a result. Facebook had used the service itself to detect an intruder uploading photos taken inside the office of its CEO, Mark Zuckerberg. After the cutoffs, the company laid off half of its staff.
