= Charles H. Jacoby Jr. =

United States Army general (1954–2025)

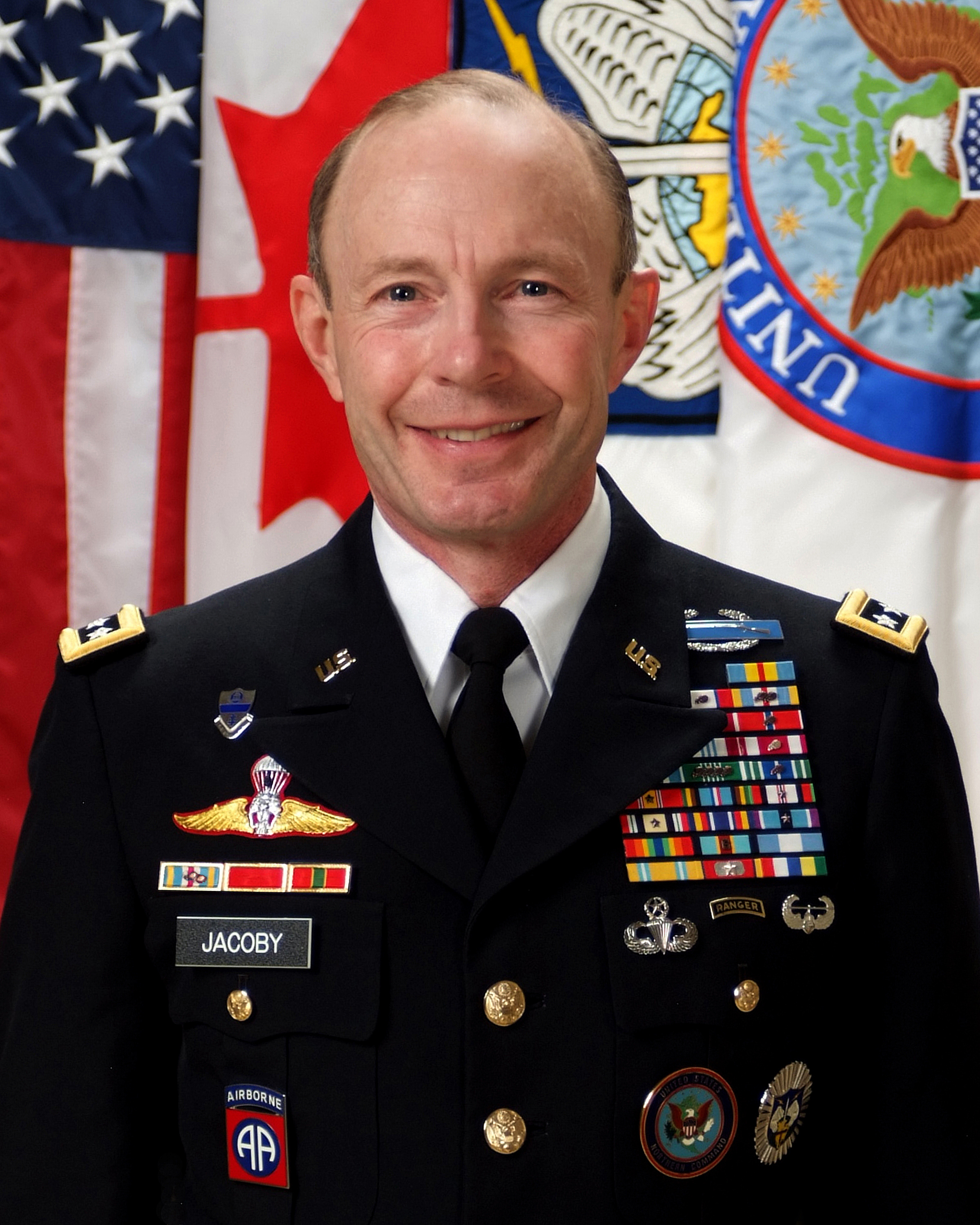
- Official portrait of GEN Jacoby, 2013
- Born: Charles Hemming Jacoby Jr. June 19, 1954; Detroit, Michigan, U.S.
- Died: April 1, 2025 (aged 70); Waxhaw, North Carolina, U.S.
- Education: United States Military Academy; University of Michigan
- Military career
- Allegiance: United States
- Branch: United States Army
- Service years: 1978–2014
- Rank: General
- Commands: United States Northern Command; North American Aerospace Defense Command; United States Army Alaska; I Corps; Multi-National Corps – Iraq
- Conflicts: Operation Urgent Fury; War in Afghanistan; Iraq War
- Awards: Defense Distinguished Service Medal (3); Army Distinguished Service Medal (2); Defense Superior Service Medal (3); Legion of Merit; Bronze Star Medal (2)

Charles Hemming Jacoby Jr. (June 19, 1954 – April 1, 2025) was a United States Army general who served as the fifth commander of United States Northern Command (USNORTHCOM) and the 22nd commander of North American Aerospace Defense Command (NORAD). General Jacoby served as vice chairman and board member of Agilion Systems, an advanced technology and strategic advisory firm. Previously he was vice chairman and board member at Tilman & Company, a predecessor to Agilion.

General Jacoby was a leading expert on modern warfare, strategic planning, and international security, as well as an accomplished writer and historian. He is a co-author of Agility: How to Navigate the Unknown and Seize Opportunity in a World of Disruption (Missionday, 2019), having also published studies on air campaigns, brigade combat teams, ballistic missile defense, and strategic deterrence. He is past distinguished chair of the Modern War Institute at the United States Military Academy at West Point and a member of the Council on Foreign Relations. He has served on the boards of the El Pomar Foundation, the Institute for Defense Analysis, Cornerstone Defense, and the US Army Infantry Museum.

Jacoby's 37 years of service include commanding at every level in joint and Army assignments, from company to geographic combatant command. He has led in combat operations in Grenada with the 82nd Airborne Division, Operation Enduring Freedom in Afghanistan, and Multinational CORP Iraq during the Operation Iraqi Freedom (2009–2011). Previously, he served as director of strategy, plans, and policy for the Joint Staff, contributed to the Middle East peace process, and represented the [.S. military at the United Nations. As a U.S. Northern Command commander, he led the military response to Hurricane Sandy. As the first Army officer to lead NORAD, he reorganized its 1,800-person bi-national and joint headquarters and integrated 35 federal, state, and non-governmental organizations for the defense and security of North America. He assumed command of USNORTHCOM and NORAD on 3 August 2011. Jacoby is notable as the first non-command pilot to serve as commander of either NORAD/USNORTHCOM, as both commands have traditionally been dominated by Air Force officers and NORAD carries a heavy air interdiction mission.

== Education ==
A 1978 graduate of the United States Military Academy, Jacoby attended the Infantry Officer Basic and Advanced courses, the Army Command and General Staff College, the School of Advanced Military Studies, and the National War College.

Jacoby earned a master's degree in history from the University of Michigan.

== Awards and decorations ==
General Jacoby's contributions have been recognized with military decorations from the governments of Canada, Mexico, Honduras, Guatemala, and Colombia.

Individual awards

Defense Distinguished Service Medal (with two bronze oak leaf clusters)
Distinguished Service Medal (with one bronze oak leaf cluster)
Defense Superior Service Medal (with two bronze oak leaf clusters)
Legion of Merit
Bronze Star Medal (with one bronze oak leaf cluster)
Defense Meritorious Service Medal
Meritorious Service Medal (with one silver oak leaf cluster)
Joint Service Commendation Medal
Army Commendation Medal (with four bronze oak leaf clusters)
Army Achievement Medal (with one bronze oak leaf cluster)
National Defense Service Medal (with one bronze service star)
Armed Forces Expeditionary Medal
Afghanistan Campaign Medal (with one bronze service star)
Iraq Campaign Medal (with one bronze service star)
Global War on Terrorism Service Medal
Humanitarian Service Medal (with one bronze service star)
Army Service Ribbon
Overseas Service Ribbon (with award numeral 6)

Unit awards

Joint Meritorious Unit Award (with two bronze oak leaf clusters)
Meritorious Unit Commendation
Superior Unit Award

International military award

Inter-American Defense Board Medal

Foreign awards

Unidentified Medal
Medal "Monja Blanca", 2nd class (Guatemala)
Commander of The Order of Military Merit José María Córdova (Colombia)
Condecoración al Mérito Militar, Primera Clase (Mexico)
Condecoración al Mérito Naval, Segunda Clase (Mexico)
Canada Meritorious Service Cross (Military Division)

Badges

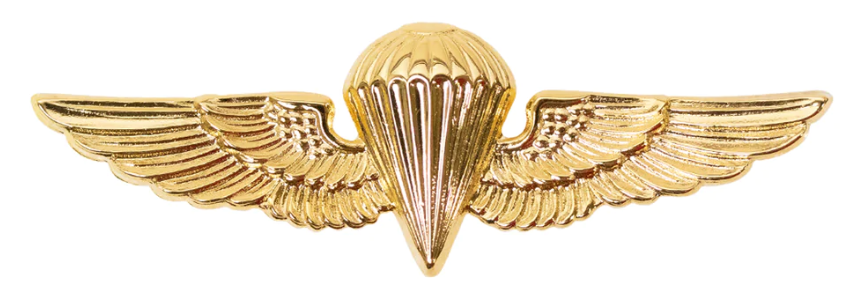
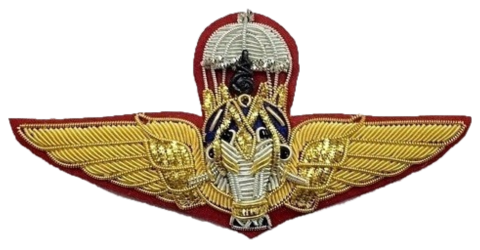
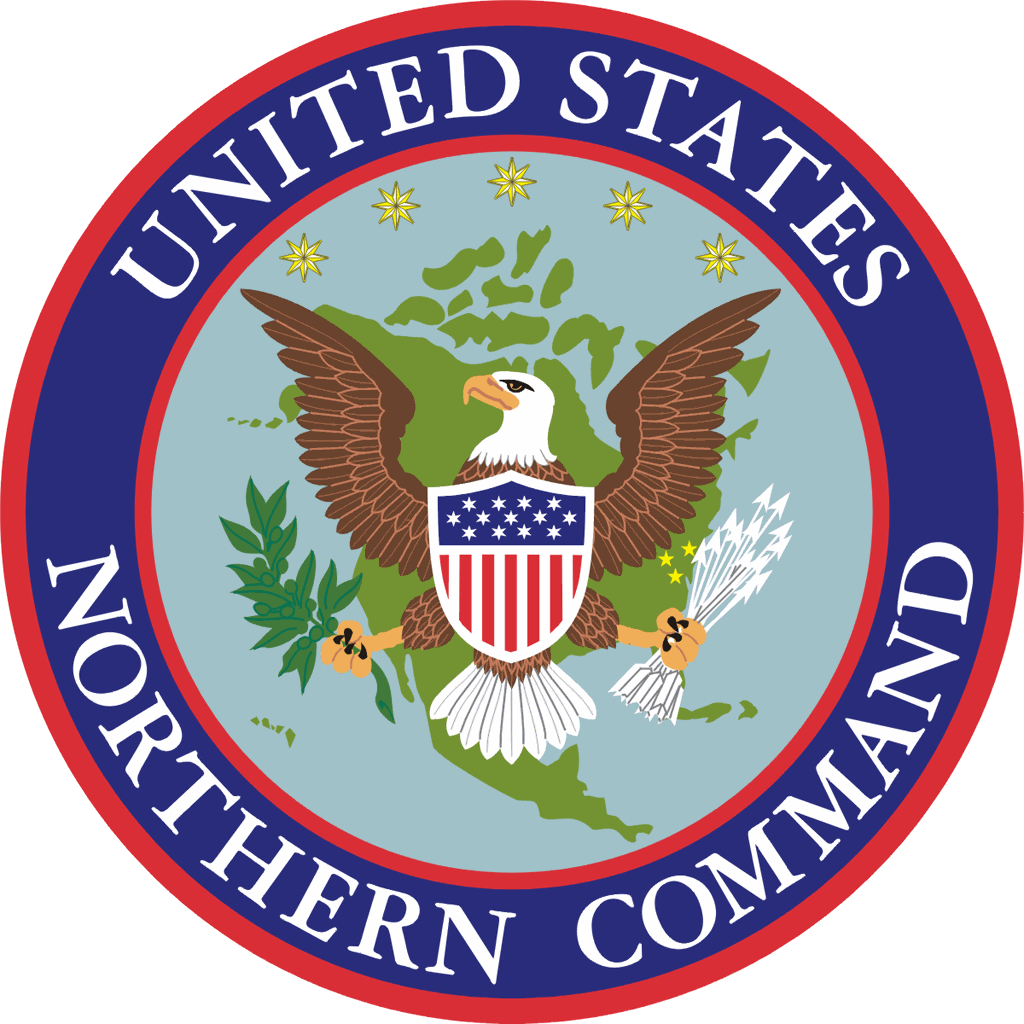
Combat Infantryman Badge
Expert Infantryman Badge
Master Parachutist Badge
Air Assault Badge
Honduran Parachutist Badge
RTA Basic Parachutist Badge
Ranger Tab
United States Northern Command Badge
North American Aerospace Defense Command Badge

Other accoutrements

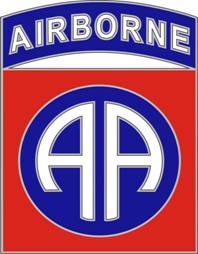
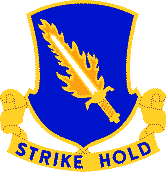
82nd Airborne Division Combat Service Identification Badge
504th Infantry Regiment Distinctive Unit Insignia
5 Overseas Service Bars

== Personal ==
Jacoby was married to Grace A. Dorta, a retired Army Lt Col, and had three sons who all served in the realm of U.S. national security.

Military offices
Preceded by James A. Winnefeld Jr.	Commander of the North American Aerospace Defense Command; Commander of the United States Northern Command; 3 August 2011 – 5 December 2014	Succeeded by William E. Gortney
