= Military decorations of Mexico =

This is a list of military decorations awarded by the United Mexican States (Estados Unidos Mexicanos) as part of the Mexican Honours System.

== Decoration for Heroic Valor ==
The Condecoración al Valor Heroico is awarded to military personnel for exceptional acts of heroism at risk of their own life; it may be awarded in both war and peace.

Description: Gilt-edged red-enameled "Lancer Cross" (equilateral cross whose arms resemble lance heads) resting on a gilt "star" of multiple rays (resembles a square with points at the cardinal points). Oval red central medallion has 1, 2, or 3 according to class, surrounded by a white band inscribed, Valor Heroico in gold. Suspended from a red and white ribbon according to class, with a gilt bar at top inscribed, Mexico.

- 1st class - solid red ribbon
- 2nd class - five equal stripes, three red and two white
- 3rd class - white ribbon with medium width red edges

== War Cross ==
The Cruz de Guerra is awarded to military personnel in time of war or armed conflict for actions that do not merit an award of the Medal of Valor.

Description: Red enameled gilt Maltese cross with "stepped" concave terminations; very large central medallion bears gilt head of Cuauhtémoc in war helmet on red background, surrounded by gilt band inscribed, Cruz de Guerra above and class of medal below. Suspended from a red ribbon with a gilt bar at the top inscribed Mexico. Comes in three classes.

== Medal of Military Merit ==
The Condecoración al Mérito Militar is presented to members of the Army and Air Force for acts of exceptional merit that greatly benefits the Mexican Armed Forces.

Description: Takes the form of an 8-pointed gilt or silver star of multiple rays, resting on a blue-enameled cross pattée with slightly concave ends; central medallion has the Mexican eagle on a blue background, surrounded by a red band inscribed, Mérito Militar above 1a or 2a and Clase. Suspended from a blue and red ribbon according to class, with a gilt or silver bar at top inscribed, Mexico.

- 1st class, Order grade - gilt star, worn directly on breast with sash
- 1st class - gilt star worn as a necklet from a golden cord
- 2nd class - silver star, blue ribbon with medium-wide red center stripe
- 3rd class - silver star, blue ribbon with 2 medium-wide red center stripes

== Medal of Naval Merit ==
The Condecoración al Mérito Naval is the Naval equivalent of the Medal of Military Merit, conferred for exceptionally meritorious acts which benefit the Mexican Navy.

Description: Gilt or silver 8-pointed star of multiple rays, with an anchor in the center in opposing metal color surrounded by a wreath of laurel and oak; inside the wreath is a blue ring inscribed, Mérito Naval in gold. Suspended from a white ribbon with blue stripes according to class.

- 1st class - gilt star with silver anchor and wreath, blue ribbon with medium-wide white center stripe
- 2nd class - silver star with gilt anchor and wreath, blue ribbon with three equally spaced narrow white stripes

== Medal of Naval Aviation Merit ==
The Condecoración al Mérito Aeronáutico Naval is the equivalent to the Medal of Naval Merit, given for exceptionally meritorious acts that benefit Mexican Naval Aviation.

Description: Consists of a gilt or silver 5-pointed star with a red central medallion bearing a silver anchor with a gilt propeller along its shaft. The band surrounding center reads, Mérito Aeronáutico. Suspended by a small gilt or silver replica of the Mexican eagle from an olive green ribbon with white stripes according to class.

- 1st class - gilt star, solid olive green ribbon
- 2nd class - silver star, olive green ribbon with equal-width white center stripe

== Medal of Technical Merit ==
The Condecoración al Mérito Técnico is presented to Army or Air Force personnel who invent or develop useful materials, methods, or reforms that contribute greatly to national defense or the benefit of the armed forces.

Description: Gilt or silver 8-pointed star of multiple rays, bearing large red central medallion with a faceted gilt 5-pointed star, surrounded by a white band inscribed, Mérito Técnico Militar. Surrounding this band is a silver wreath of laurel and oak. Suspended by a small replica of the Mexican eagle from a green and white ribbon according to class, with a gilt or silver bar at top inscribed, Mexico.

- 1st Class - gilt medal; light green ribbon with medium-wide white edges
- 2nd Class - silver medal; ribbon has five equal stripes, three white and two light green

== Medal of Naval Technical Merit ==
The Condecoración al Mérito Técnico Naval is equivalent to the Medal of Technical Merit, awarded to Naval personnel for the development of materials, methods, or reforms that contribute to national defense or the professional expertise of the Navy.

Description: Consists of a gold or silver cross with pointed terminations and slightly curved arms, resting on pointed rays. Blue central medallion bears a silver anchor, surrounded by a red band inscribed, Mérito Técnico Naval in black. Suspended by a small replica of the Mexican eagle from a blue and white ribbon according to class.

- 1st class - gold cross, blue ribbon
- 2nd class - silver cross, blue ribbon with equal-width white center stripe

== Medal for Academic Merit ==
The Condecoración al Mérito Facultativo is bestowed on students who achieve exceptional marks during their studies at the Military Academies. First class medals are given to those who achieve first-tier grades during all their years of study, and second class medals to those who post first and second tier marks. There is also the Medal for Naval Academic Merit.

Description: Round medal with raised rim, bearing figure of the statute of the Virgin Mary of Guadalupe, with the Higher Military Academy in the background. Suspended from a green and white ribbon according to class, with a gilt or silver bar at top inscribed, Mexico.

- 1st class - gilt medal, moss green ribbon with medium width white center stripe
- 2nd class - silver medal, ribbon has five equal stripes, three moss green and two white

== Medal for Educational Merit ==
The Condecoración al Mérito Docente recognizes instructors at Higher Military Schools who discharge their duties in an exemplary manner for at least three years.

Description: Gilt 8-pointed star of multiple rays, with blue central medallion bearing head of Aztec chieftain Cuauhtémoc behind the head of the goddess Athena, enclosed within a white band inscribed, Recompensa al Saber y Asidua Aplicacion. A green wreath of laurel surrounds the white band. Suspended from a ribbon with three equal stripes of red-green-red, with a gilt bar at top inscribed, Mexico.

== Long Service Medal - Army and Air Force ==
The Condecoración a la Perseverancia is granted to military personnel of the Army and Air Force for faithful, uninterrupted periods of military service to the country.

Description: Basic form is a Maltese cross with two or three inner raised rims, resting on one or two circular wreaths of laurel, with a large round gilt central medallion bearing the number of years service surrounded by a white band inscribed Perseverancia above and the class of medal below. Suspended by a small replica of the Mexican eagle or a 5-pointed star from a ribbon colored according to class, with a gilt bar at top inscribed Mexico.

- Service for the Fatherland (50 years service and beyond) - yellow enameled gilt cross, two laurel wreaths, diagonal red-white-green ribbon with the Mexican eagle as suspender
- Institutional Service (45 years service) - red enameled gilt cross, two laurel wreaths, diagonal red-white-green ribbon with the Mexican eagle as suspender
- Extraordinary Service (40 years service) - white enameled gilt cross, two laurel wreaths, red ribbon with medium-narrow green-white center stripe, Mexican eagle as suspender
- Special Service (35 years service) - white enameled gilt cross, gilt laurel wreath, diagonal yellow above gray ribbon divided by narrow green-white-red stripes, Mexican eagle as suspender
- 1st Class (30 years service) - gilt cross with blue rims, laurel wreath, white ribbon with diagonal green-white-red center stripes, Mexican eagle as suspender
- 2nd Class (25 years service) - red enameled cross, laurel wreath, ribbon of three equal green-white-red stripes with the Mexican eagle as suspender
- 3rd Class (20 years service) - green enameled cross, laurel wreath, ribbon with five equal green-white-red-white-green stripes, 5-pointed star as a suspender
- 4th Class (15 years service) - white enameled cross, laurel wreath, white ribbon with medium width green (left) and red edges, 5-pointed star as suspender
- 5th Class (10 years service) - red enameled cross, silver laurel wreath, halved green (left) and red (right) ribbon with 5-pointed star as suspender

== Long Service Medal - Navy ==
The Condecoración a la Perseverancia is granted to military personnel of the Navy for faithful, uninterrupted periods of military service to the country.

Description: Basic form is a Maltese cross with two or three inner raised rims, resting on one or two circular wreaths of laurel, with a large round gilt central medallion bearing the number of years service surrounded by a white band inscribed Perseverancia above and the class of medal below. Suspended by a small replica of the Mexican eagle or a 5-pointed star from a ribbon colored according to class, with a gilt bar at top inscribed Mexico.

- Exceptional Service 1st Class (50 years service and beyond) - yellow enameled gilt cross, two laurel wreaths, diagonal red-white-green ribbon with the Mexican eagle as suspender
- Exceptional Service 2nd Class (45 years service) - red enameled gilt cross, two laurel wreaths, diagonal red-white-green ribbon with the Mexican eagle as suspender
- Exceptional Service 3rd Class (40 years service) - white enameled gilt cross, two laurel wreaths, red ribbon with medium-narrow green-white center stripe, Mexican eagle as suspender
- 1st Class (35 years service) - white enameled gilt cross, gilt laurel wreath, diagonal yellow above gray ribbon divided by narrow green-white-red stripes, Mexican eagle as suspender
- 2nd Class (30 years service) - gilt cross with blue rims, laurel wreath, white ribbon with diagonal green-white-red center stripes, Mexican eagle as suspender
- 3rd Class (25 years service) - red enameled cross, laurel wreath, ribbon of three equal green-white-red stripes with the Mexican eagle as suspender
- 4th Class (20 years service) - green enameled cross, laurel wreath, ribbon with five equal green-white-red-white-green stripes, 5-pointed star as a suspender
- 5th Class (15 years service) - white enameled cross, laurel wreath, white ribbon with medium width green (left) and red edges, 5-pointed star as suspender
- 6th Class (10 years service) - red enameled cross, silver laurel wreath, halved green (left) and red (right) ribbon with 5-pointed star as suspender

== Military Sports Medal ==
The Condecoración al Merito Deportivo Militar is given to military personnel who distinguish themselves while representing Mexico in either individual or team sports competitions.

Description: Rectangular yellow alloy medal with circular emblem in center representing various sports, with inscription Merito above and Deportivo below. Suspended by a Mexican eagle resting in the flames of a torch from an orange and white ribbon according to class, with a gilt bar at top inscribed, Mexico.

- 1st Class - orange ribbon with medium width white edges
- 2nd Class - white ribbon with five equal width stripes, three white and two orange
- 3rd Class - white ribbon with seven equal width stripes, four white and three orange
- 4th Class - white ribbon with nine equal width stripes, five white and four orange

== Distinguished Service Medal ==
Gafete of the Condecoración a Servicios Distinguidos.

The Condecoración a Servicios Distinguidos is presented to Army and Air Force personnel who demonstrate initiative and dedication throughout the course of their military career.

Description: Round gilt medal with outer rim formed by a wreath of laurel enclosing inner beaded, raised rim; center bears 10-rayed Aztec style "sun wheel" with Toltec pyramid inside, above inscription Servicios Distinguidos. Suspended by a small Mexican eagle from a ribbon of three equal light blue-white-light blue stripes with a gilt bar at top inscribed, Mexico.

== Pacific Service Medal ==
The Condecoración por Servicio en el Lejano Oriente recognizes military personnel, primarily members of the Mexican Expeditionary Air Force, who fought against the Japanese in the Pacific during 1944–45.

Description: Round medal with silver rim inscribed Servicio en el Lejano Oriente enclosing yellow enamel ring surrounding gilt central medallion bearing Aztec "sun god" emitting rays with three 5-pointed stars below and to sides. Gilt FAEM pilot's wing with pointed, enameled shield is mounted just above the center medallion, partially obscuring the top of the medallion and with wings breaking the edge of the medal. Suspended from a unique ribbon, half green (left) and half red with triangular white field inset at top; gilt attachment bar at top reads Mexico.

== Legion of Honor ==
The Condecoración de la Legión de Honor Mexicano is awarded to officers inducted into the Mexican Legion of Honor as a result of their efforts and achievements.

Description: Red enameled gilt Maltese cross with single blue inward pointing arrowhead inserted between the points of the terminations, with single sharp ray between each arm; the whole rests on a light blue oval with serrated edges. Hollow central oval bears gilt figure of warrior king Cuauhtémoc in feathered headdress surrounded by red band inscribed, Legión de Honor above a half-wreath of laurel. Suspended by a small gilt Mexican eagle from a light blue ribbon with medium-width yellow edges, with a gilt bar at top inscribed, Mexico.

== Retirees Medal ==
The Condecoración de Retiro is presented to officers who retire after more than 45 years active service.

Description: Vaguely cross shaped medal, each arm formed by three pointed rays (center ray longer than other two) with single, wide faceted ray between the arms (looks like pointed cross resting on an octagon). Central oval portrays hand above volcano within half-wreath of laurel, all on field of inscribed rays. Suspended from a sky-blue ribbon with equal width golden-yellow center stripe, with a gilt bar at top inscribed, Mexico.

- Banda - badge on sash for General Officers
- Collar - badge on neck ribbon for Senior Officers
- Medalla - badge on chest ribbon for Officers

== Anti-Narcotics Campaign Medal of Merit ==
The Condecoración por Mérito en Campaña contra el Narcotráfico recognizes military personnel and civilians for active participation in countering narcotics traffic.

Description: Red-enameled gilt cross pattee with slightly widened terminations, with an 8-pointed star of multiple blunt rays in the center; the three major rays of each point are square-ended and extend more than the other rays. Green central medallion bears gilt map of Mexico, surrounded by white band inscribed, Merito en Campana above and Narcotrafico below. Suspended by a small replica of a Mexican eagle from a green and black ribbon according to class, with a gilt bar at top inscribed Mexico.

- Orden - slightly larger cross, green ribbon with wide black center stripe and overlaid diagonal green-white-red central stripe
- 1st Class - cross suspended from green ribbon with wide black center stripe
- 2nd Class - cross suspended from ribbon with five equal green-black-green-black-green stripes
- 3rd Class - cross suspended from ribbon with three equal green-black-green stripes

== See also ==
- Mexican Imperial Orders
