= Strasbourg–Wörth railway =

French-German railway

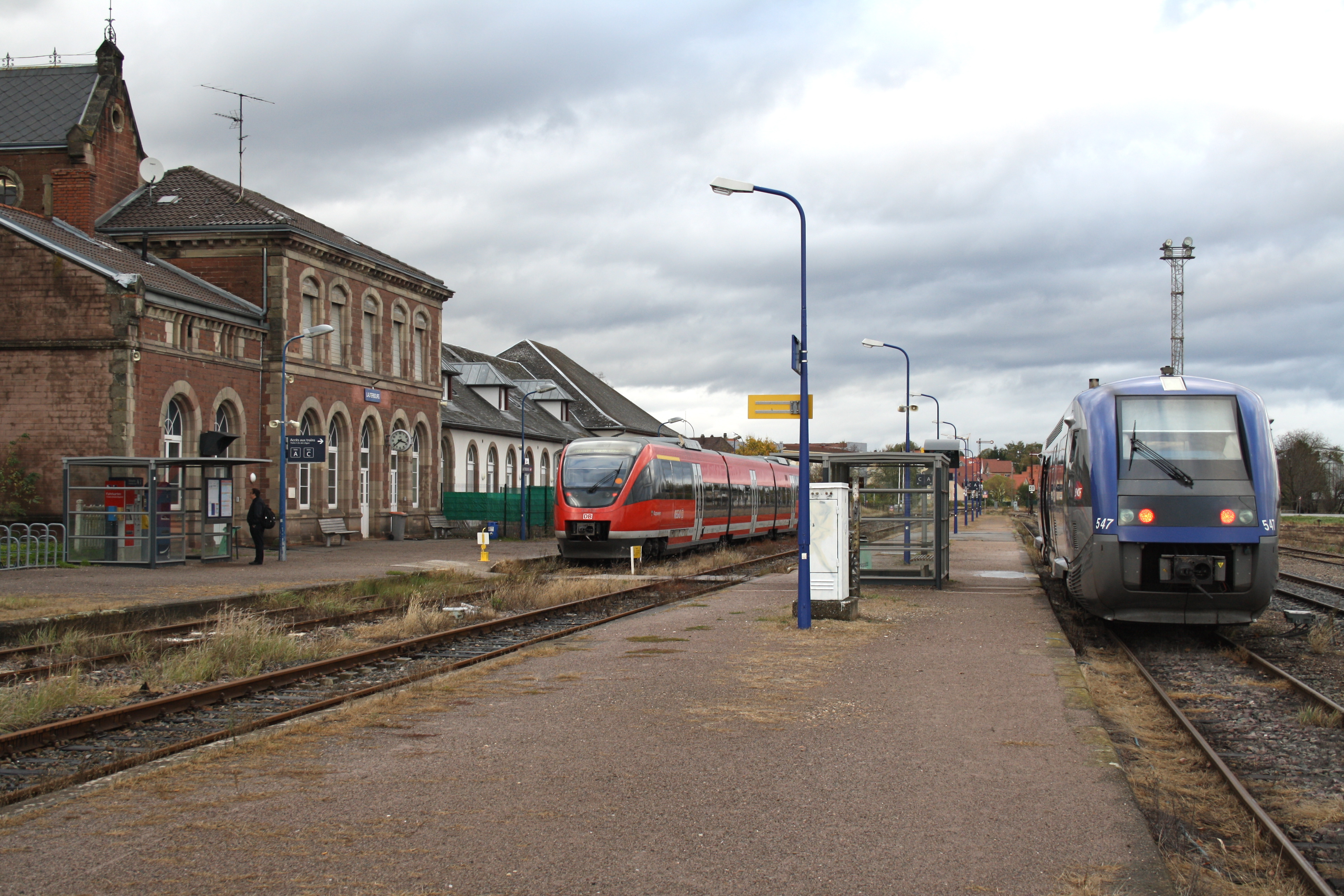
- French and German trains in Lauterbourg

Overview
- Line number: 105 (France); 677.1 (Germany)
- Locale: Grand Est, France and Rhineland-Palatinate, Germany

Service
- Route number: 145 (France); 3400 (Germany)

Technical
- Line length: 70.8 km (44.0 mi)
- Track gauge: 1,435 mm (4 ft 8 1/2 in) standard gauge
Route map
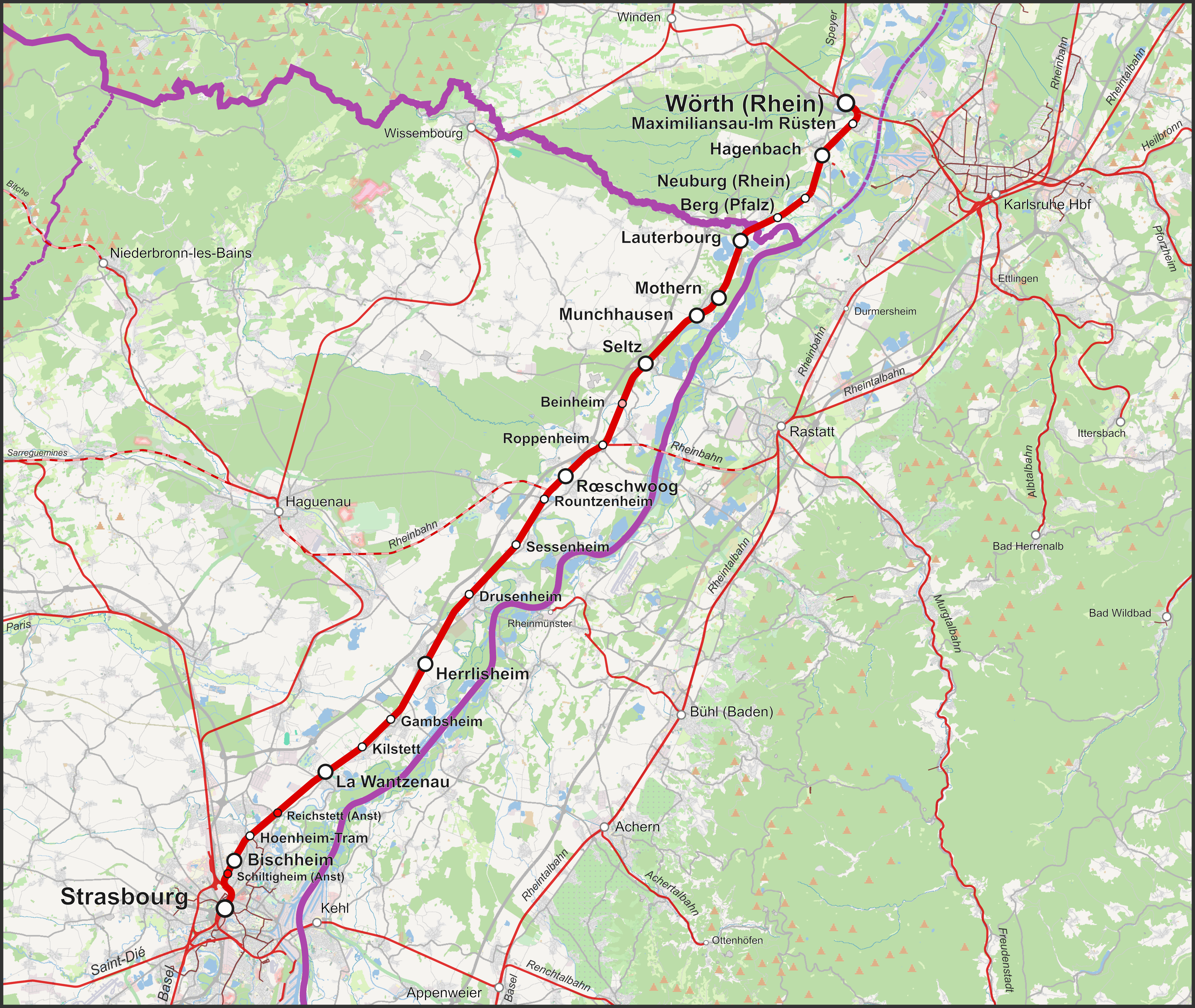
- Source: French Railway Atlas (north), German Railway Atlas

The Strasbourg–Wörth railway is a French-German railway, which runs in the French region of Grand Est and the German state of Rhineland-Palatinate.

The route was opened on 15 May 1876 and was at that time completely within the German Empire. From 1906 to 1914 it was part of the European long-distance transport network. Long-distance services ended as a result of the First World War and the resulting return of Alsace to France. As a result, the remaining part of the line in Germany also lost importance. This resulted in the closure of passenger services between Wörth and Berg in 1984.

In 2002, passenger traffic between Wörth and Lauterbourg was reactivated, although no through services currently run through to Strasbourg. Since its reactivation, the German section of the route has also been designated for marketing purposes as the Bienwaldbahn (Bienwald Railway), since it runs along the eastern edge of the Bienwald.

Meanwhile, it still plays an important role in the transport of freight, notably in recent decades for the transport of nuclear waste (dry cask storage) from Cap de la Hague to Gorleben.

== History ==
=== First aspirations (1840–1870) ===
Originally, it was planned to build a railway line in the north–south direction to Lauterbourg within the then Bavarian Circle of the Rhine (Rheinkreis), which failed, however, due to problems with the then border, as Lauterbourg was part of France at the time. Instead, the Palatine Ludwig Railway (Pfälzische Ludwigsbahn) was built between 1847 and 1849 from Rheinschanze (Ludwigshafen from 1853) to Bexbach; this mainly served the transport of coal. A branch line from Schifferstadt to Speyer was also built at the same time.

Plans for a north–south connection were subsequently developed. There were two options for discussion: one would run from Neustadt via Landau to Wissembourg in Alsace and continue from there to Strasbourg. The other would extend the branch to Speyer via Germersheim and Lauterbourg to Strasbourg. The first option prevailed, because France hesitated and because the former option passed through territory that was more densely settled than a route along the Rhine valley.

After the Schifferstadt–Speyer branch line, which was opened by the Palatine Ludwig Railway Company (Pfälzische Ludwigsbahn-Gesellschaft) in 1848, was extended to Germersheim in 1864, plans were developed to continue it through to Wörth and along the Rhine to Lauterbourg. Already in 1863, a local committee met in Maximiliansau (until 1938: Pfortz) not far from the Wörth floating bridge, with representatives of Germersheim, Bellheim, Rülzheim, Rheinzabern, Wörth am Rhein and Pfortz. Also present was the mayor of the Alsatian city of Lauterbourg. The latter was open-minded to the plan and reported on French plans to build a trunk line on the Lille – Thionville – Sarreguemines – Lauterbourg – Maxau – Karlsruhe route, as part of a link from London to Vienna and the east. In addition, the French railway company Chemins de fer de l'Est was interested in contesting competition in Strasbourg.

=== Planning, construction, opening and subsequent period (1870–1876) ===
In the meantime, the political environment had changed. As a result of the Franco-Prussian War, France had to cede Alsace-Lorraine to the newly founded German Empire. The Palatine Maximilian Railway Company (Pfälzische Maximiliansbahn-Gesellschaft), which owned most of the south Palatinate railway network, and the newly founded Imperial Railways in Alsace-Lorraine (Kaiserliche Generaldirektion der Eisenbahnen in Elsaß-Lothringen) agreed to build a railway from Ludwigshafen via Schifferstadt, Germersheim, Wörth and Lauterburg to Strasbourg. At first, the Reichstag had resolved that the Alsace section had to be built and operated by a private company, but it was taken over directly by the imperial government for strategic reasons.

Various railway engineers produced a general draft for the route from Wörth to Lauterbourg in 1872 and 1873 and then presented it to the Bavarian government. The latter gave the go-ahead for the project on 7 February 1874 in the form of a law giving an interest rate guarantee and it granted a concession on 18 August of the same year in the name of the Maximilian Railway Company for the Palatinate Railway.

The railway line was opened on 24 and 25 July 1876 together with the line from Germersheim to Wörth as part of the Schifferstadt–Speyer–Germersheim–Wörth–Lauterburg–Strasbourg trunk line. The Maximilian Railway Company was responsible for the Palatinate segment and the Alsace-Lorraine Railways for the Alsace section.

=== Further development (1876–1930) ===
In the first decades the line was mainly used for freight transport. Double tracking was completed on the section between Wörth and Lauterburg and the line from Schifferstadt in 1906. The express trains from Berlin to Strasbourg, which had previously run via the Neustadt–Wissembourg railway, now ran via Speyer and Germersheim, as this journey was shorter and there was now sufficient capacity on the line. From then on, the line including its northern continuation to Schifferstadt together with the Maximilian Railway was in close competition with the Baden main line between Mannheim and Basel.

The Palatine section, along with the other railways within the Palatinate, was absorbed into the Royal Bavarian State Railways (Königlich Bayerische Staatseisenbahnen) on 1 January 1909. The outbreak of the First World War brought the long-distance traffic to a standstill.

After Alsace was ceded to France as a result of the First World War, the French section of the line became the property of the newly founded Réseau ferroviaire d’Alsace-Lorraine, while the Palatine section became part of Deutsche Reichsbahn (DR). The latter allocated its section to the newly created Reichsbahndirektion (railway division) of Ludwigshafen in 1922.

In addition, DR ordered that the long-distance services run from now on through Baden to keep them within their own territory as long as possible, thus making the Strasbourg–Wörth line less important. The so-called Regiebetrieb (military operation) commenced in 1923 on the German part of the line as a consequence of the French occupation, which meant that the railway was operated by the French military until the beginning of 1924. Later, as the relations between Germany and France relaxed, cross-border freight operations again took place.

=== The Second World War and loss of significance (1930–1990) ===
On 1 February 1937, the German section came under the management of the Karlsruhe railway division, since the one in Ludwigshafen was dissolved two months later. On 1 January of the following year, the French section of the line came to the newly established SNCF. Passenger traffic came to a standstill with the outbreak of the Second World War, while freight trains operated almost throughout the war.

It was only in the middle of 1945, after the end of the war, that the operation were restored. The Betriebsvereinigung der Südwestdeutschen Eisenbahnen (Union of south-west German railways, SWDE) took over operations on the German section in 1947; it was absorbed into the newly founded Deutsche Bundesbahn (DB) in 1949. The line was part of the area of responsibility of the railway division of Mainz until its dissolution on 1 August 1971, when the railway division of Karlsruhe was again responsible. After the Second World War, the line was downgraded to a secondary line. At the same time, cross-border traffic has been severely limited; Berg (Pfalz), the last station on the German side, was the terminus for rail services. It was not until the 1950s that any trains crossed the border to Lauterbourg. Operations of the Ludwigshafen–Strasbourg express, which had mainly served the French armed forces, was terminated on 11 June 1980, ending cross-border passenger services on the line. The remaining passenger services between Wörth and Berg were also discontinued on 1 June 1984.

However, extensive freight traffic continued along the line. For example, up to five pairs of freight train were operated daily, often using French locomotives. During this period the transport of dry casks over the line to and from the nuclear reprocessing facilities at La Hague and Sellafield occasionally took place, which led regularly to protests by nuclear power opponents and resulted in a corresponding media presence.

=== Reactivation of passenger traffic on the German side (since 1999) ===
In the course of the rail reform, the section of line in Germany became the property of Deutsche Bahn. From 1999 until the end of 2002, excursion trains ran on the line from Wörth to Lauterbourg without intervening stops on Sundays and holidays from April to October. The excursion trains were called the Bienwaldexpress and consisted of a total of four train pairs.

The reactivation of daily passenger services took place at the 2002/2003 timetable change on 15 December 2002. Modern platforms were built at the disused stations of Hagenbach, Neuburg and Berg. The halt of Maximiliansau Im Rüsten was re-established in 2002, as the development of Maximiliansau was increasingly oriented towards the Bienwald Railway in the west.

The line is regularly used for the transport of nuclear waste. Since the prohibition of so-called nuclear reprocessing in 2005, transports of spent fuel no longer take place. However, highly radioactive waste packaged in glass chips (in particular from the French La Hague reprocessing plant to the Gorleben storage unit) continue to be carried along this line. On 8 September 2008, the line was blocked by three demonstrators near Berg, who had chained themselves to a concrete block under the tracks, prior to the running of such a transport. Using heavy equipment, the police managed to remove the activists after about twelve hours. The train with the nuclear waste containers had to wait for this time in Lauterbourg. In 2010, a train scheduled for this route with nuclear waste from La Hague had to be diverted at short notice via Strasbourg and Kehl, because the track near the station was blocked by a sit-in involving several hundred opponents of nuclear power.

=== Planning ===
It is planned to abolish the need to change trains at Lauterbourg, which currently still exists, by using the modern SNCF diesel multiple units of the Lauterbourg–Strasbourg on the route to Wörth. Four upgraded connections have been scheduled in Lauterbourg since December 2016. Starting from 2017, between the end of May and the end of October, there will be four regular trips between Wörth and Strasbourg on weekends. This is only possible with the use of SNCF diesel multiple units that are approved ro run on both the German and the French rail network. In addition, there was the idea of establishing a Stadtbahn line from Strasbourg to the inner city of Karlsruhe. This idea, however, has not been pursued so far, since it is feared in France that it would encourage Strasbourg residents to shop in Karlsruhe.

== Route ==
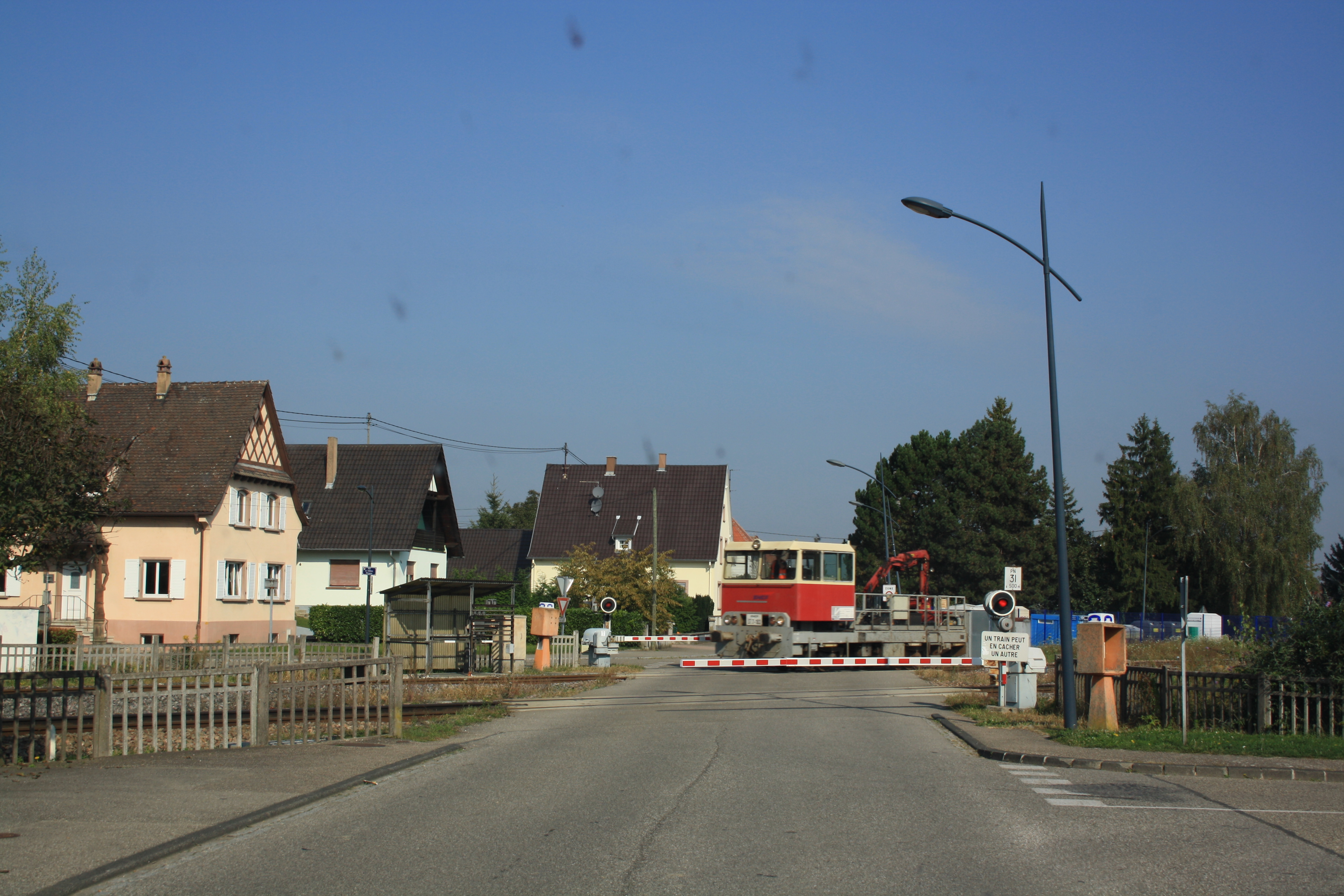
SNCF class DU 84 Draisine in Herrlisheim

The line leaves Wörth in a southeastern direction and runs along the Bienwald. It crosses two old courses of the Rhine and crosses the Franco-German border between Berg and Lauterbourg. It always remains in the Upper Rhine Valley. In the south, it meets among other lines, the Strasbourg–Basel railway.

== Operating points ==
=== Wörth (Rhein) ===
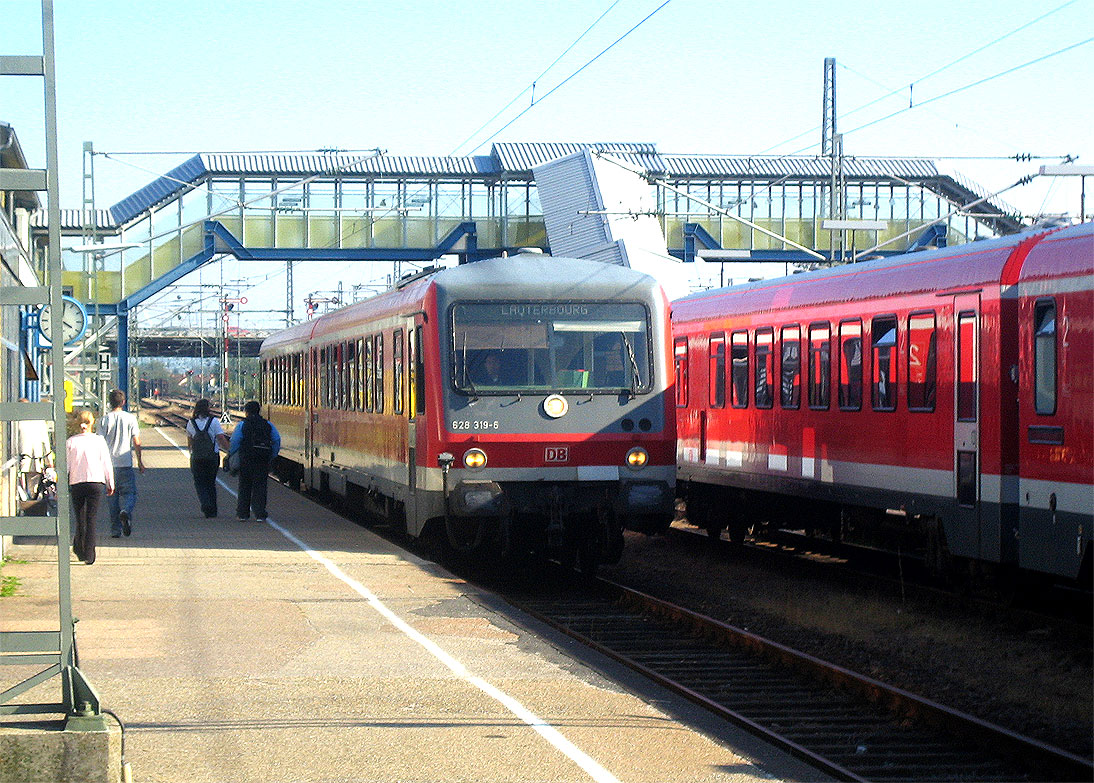
Train to Lauterbourg in Wörth station

Wörth (Rhein) station is located to the southeast of the centre of Wörth. The Schifferstadt-Wörth railway runs from it to the north and the Winden–Karlsruhe railway line runs in the west–east direction. Since 1997, a Stadtbahn line has also branched off from the station to run into the inner town of Wörth. Its entrance building is under monument protection.

=== Maximiliansau Im Rüsten ===
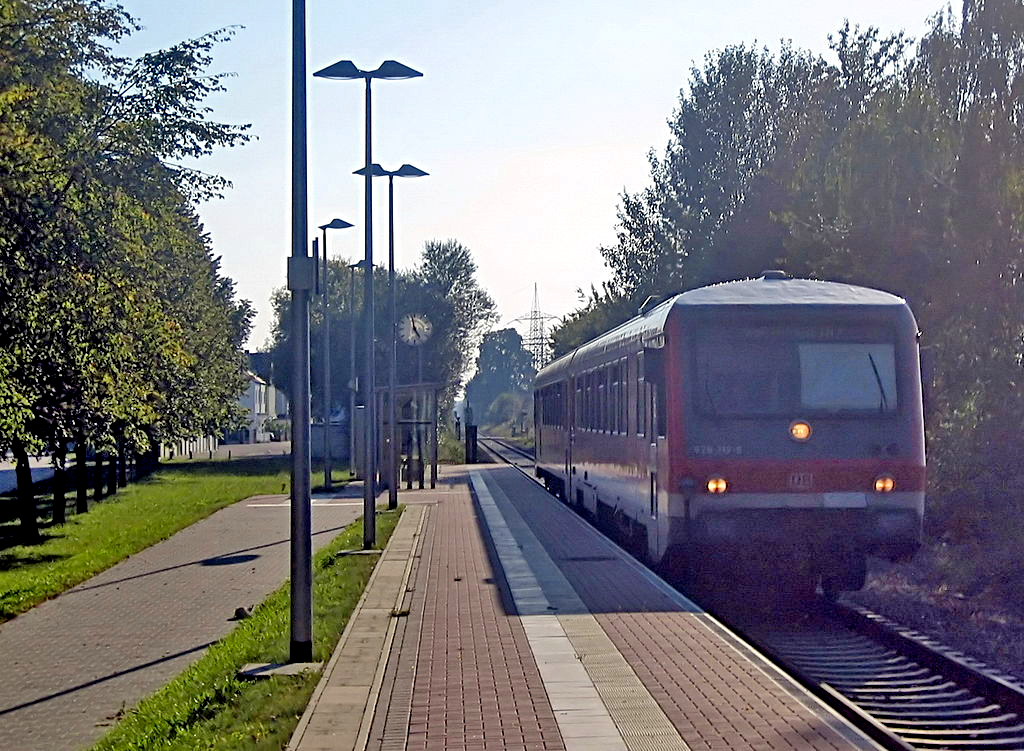
Haltepunkt Maximiliansau Im Rüsten

The halt of Maximiliansau Im Rüsten was put into operation during the revival of passenger services in the German section of the line in 2002 and opens up the western part of Maximiliansau.

=== Hagenbach ===
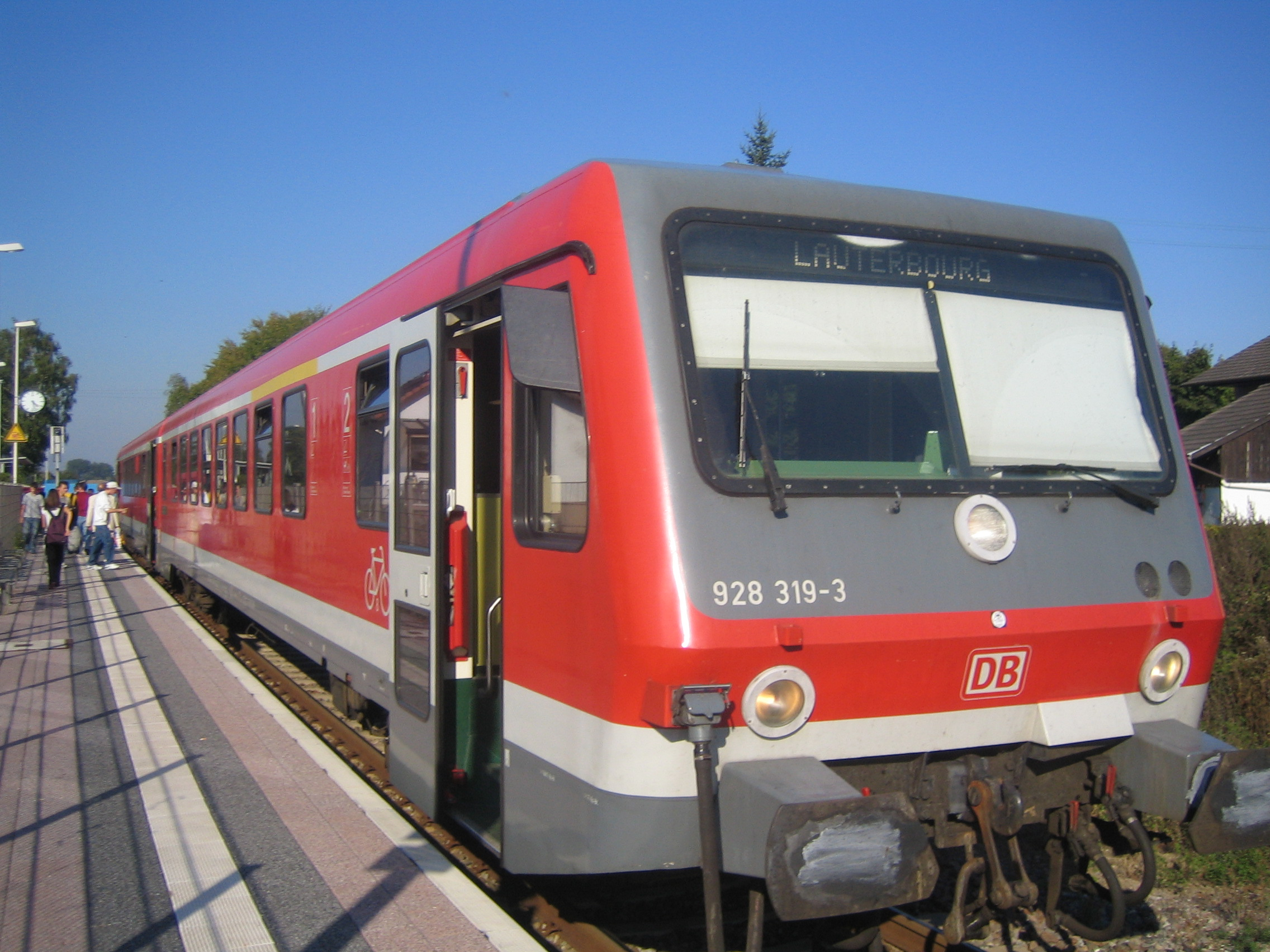
Train in Hagenbach station

The former station and current halt of Hagenbach is located on the south-eastern outskirts of Hagenbach. Around 1990, it lost its crossing loop. Its entrance building was demolished in 2009.

=== Neuburg (Rhein) ===
The former station and current halt of Neuburg (Rhein) is located in the northwest of Neuburg am Rhein. Its entrance building, which no longer plays a role in railway operations, is also a protected monument.

=== Berg (Pfalz) ===
The former station and current halt of Berg (Pfalz) is located on the southeastern outskirts of Berg (Pfalz). It has a bus connection. Its entrance building no longer plays a role in railway operations. From 1945 to 1984, it was also the terminus for trains from the direction of Wörth.

=== Lauterbourg ===
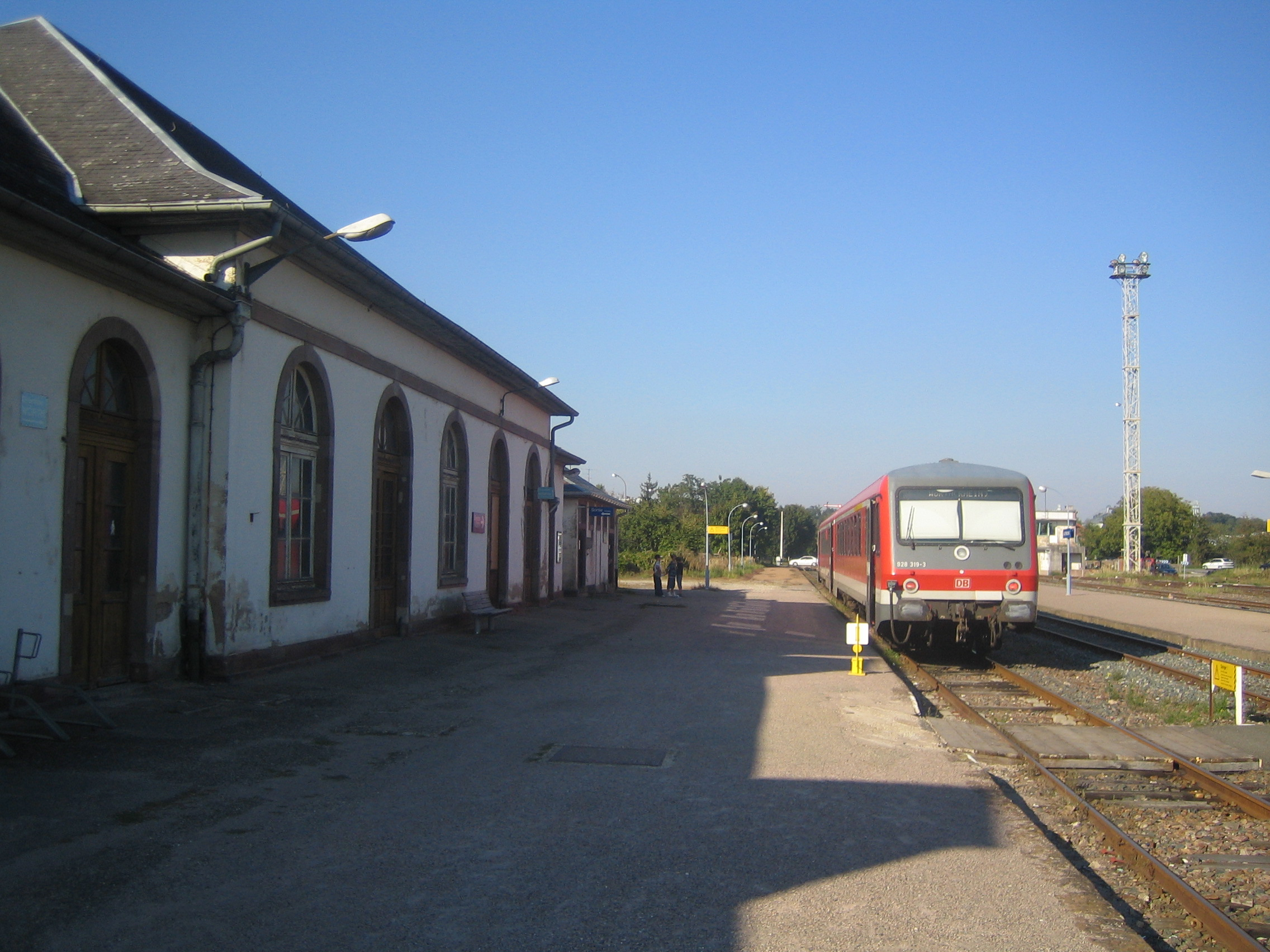
DB Class 628 diesel multiple unit in Lauterbourg station

Lauterbourg station is located on the southeastern outskirts of Lauterbourg. At the time of the opening of the line in 1876, the station was called Lauterburg. After the cession of the town back to France, it received its current name. From 1900, it was also the eastern terminus of the Lauterbourg–Wissembourg railway, the eastern section of which had already been closed as early as 1947 and has now been completely dismantled. Its entrance building is decorated in the Prussian style of the Imperial Railways in Alsace-Lorraine.

=== Mothern ===
The halt of Mothern is located on the northeastern outskirts of Mothern.

=== Munchhausen ===
The halt of Munchhausen is located on the northwestern outskirts of Munchhausen. Originally, it was called Münchhausen. It received its present name when the community was returned to France with the rest of Alsace.

=== Seltz ===
Seltz station is located in the southwest of the community of Seltz. Originally, it was called Selz. It received its present name when the community was returned to France with the rest of Alsace. In addition, it was once the eastern terminus of the now dismantled Mertzwiller–Seltz railway.

=== Beinheim ===
Beinheim station is located about halfway between Beinheim and Kesseldorf, not far from the Sauer river.

=== Beinheim-Embranchement ===
Beinheim-Embranchement station is located northwest of the built-up area of Beinheim and has now been abandoned due to its peripheral location for passenger traffic. However, it still exists as a freight yard.

=== Roppenheim ===
The former station and current halt of Roppenheim is located on the northeastern outskirts of Roppenheim. From 1895 it was also part of a strategic railway, which ran from Rastatt to Haguenau. Today this line only runs to the industrial area of Beinheim.

=== Rœschwoog ===
Rœschwoog station is located on the northwestern outskirts of Rœschwoog. Originally, it was called Röschwoog. It was not until the community was returned to France with the rest of Alsace, that it was given its present name. From 1895, it was also part of the strategic railway, which came from Rastatt and ran parallel to the line to Strasbourg from Roppenheim and continued to Haguenau.

=== Rountzenheim ===
The halt of Rountzenheim is located near the centre of Rountzenheim. Originally, it was called Runzenheim. It was not until the community was returned to France with the rest of Alsace, that it was given its present name.

=== Sessenheim ===
The halt of Sessenheim is located near the centre of Sessenheim.

=== Drusenheim ===
Drusenheim station is located in the west of Drusenheim.

=== Herrlisheim ===
Herrlisheim station is located in the southeast of Herrlisheim.

=== Gambsheim ===
The halt of Gambsheim is located on the northwestern outskirts of Gambsheim.

=== Kilstett ===
The halt of Kilstett is located on the northwestern outskirts of Kilstett, in the immediate vicinity of the departmental route D468 (Route Nationale).

=== La Wantzenau ===
La Wantzenau station is located on the northwest of La Wantzenau.

=== Hœnheim Tram ===
Hœnheim Tram station (also Hoenheim Tram) is located in the industrial area of Hœnheim. Since September 2002, it has been possible to change to line B of the Strasbourg tramway, which ends at the station forecourt and offers a direct connection to the city centre of Strasbourg.

A railway workshop opened on an area of 30 hectares in 1875, mostly in the neighbouring village of Bischheim, but 10 hectares of it was situated in the district of Hœnheim. Originally, the station was called Hönheim. When the community was returned to France with the rest of Alsace, it received the name of Hœnheim. During the opening of tram line B in September 2002, it was given the name of Hœnheim Tram. However, the station is called Hœnheim Gare by the Strasbourg tramway.

=== Bischheim ===
Bischheim station is located near the centre of Bischheim. In 1875, a railway workshop was opened on an area of 30 hectares, of which 10 hectares are situated on the territory of the neighbouring community Hœnheim.

=== Schiltigheim ===
The halt of Schiltigheim is located near the centre of Schiltigheim.

=== Strasbourg ===
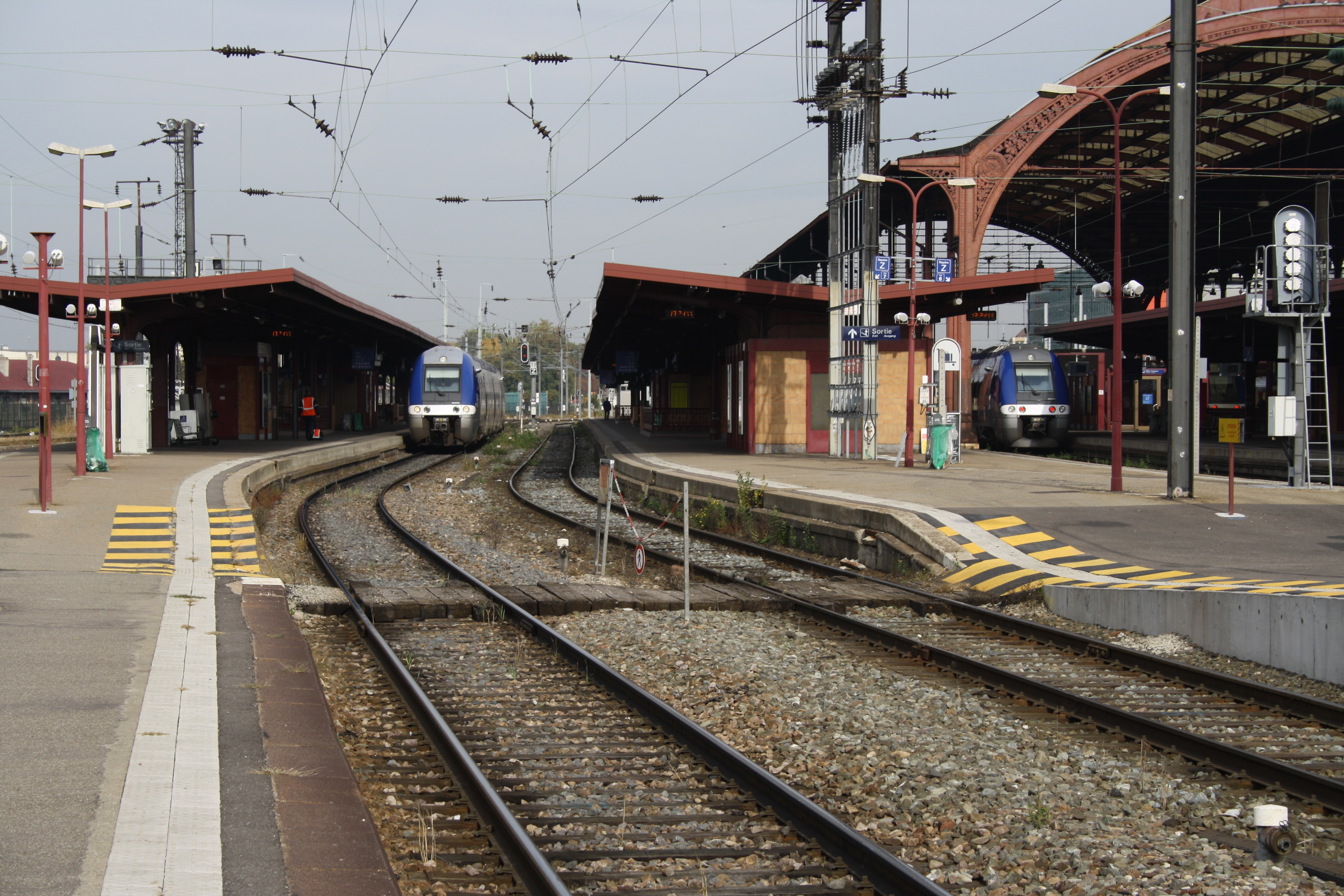
View of the western railway tracks from Strasbourg station

Strasbourg station has existed since 1883 and replaced its predecessor, which was located at the Place des halles and was a terminal station. As the terminus of the line from Paris and as the starting point of the lines to Appenweier, Basel and Saint-Dié, it is an important railway junction in Alsace. Its two-storey entrance building made of Buntsandstein is designated as a Monument historique. It was upgraded during its integration into the French TGV network in 2006 and 2007.

== Operations ==
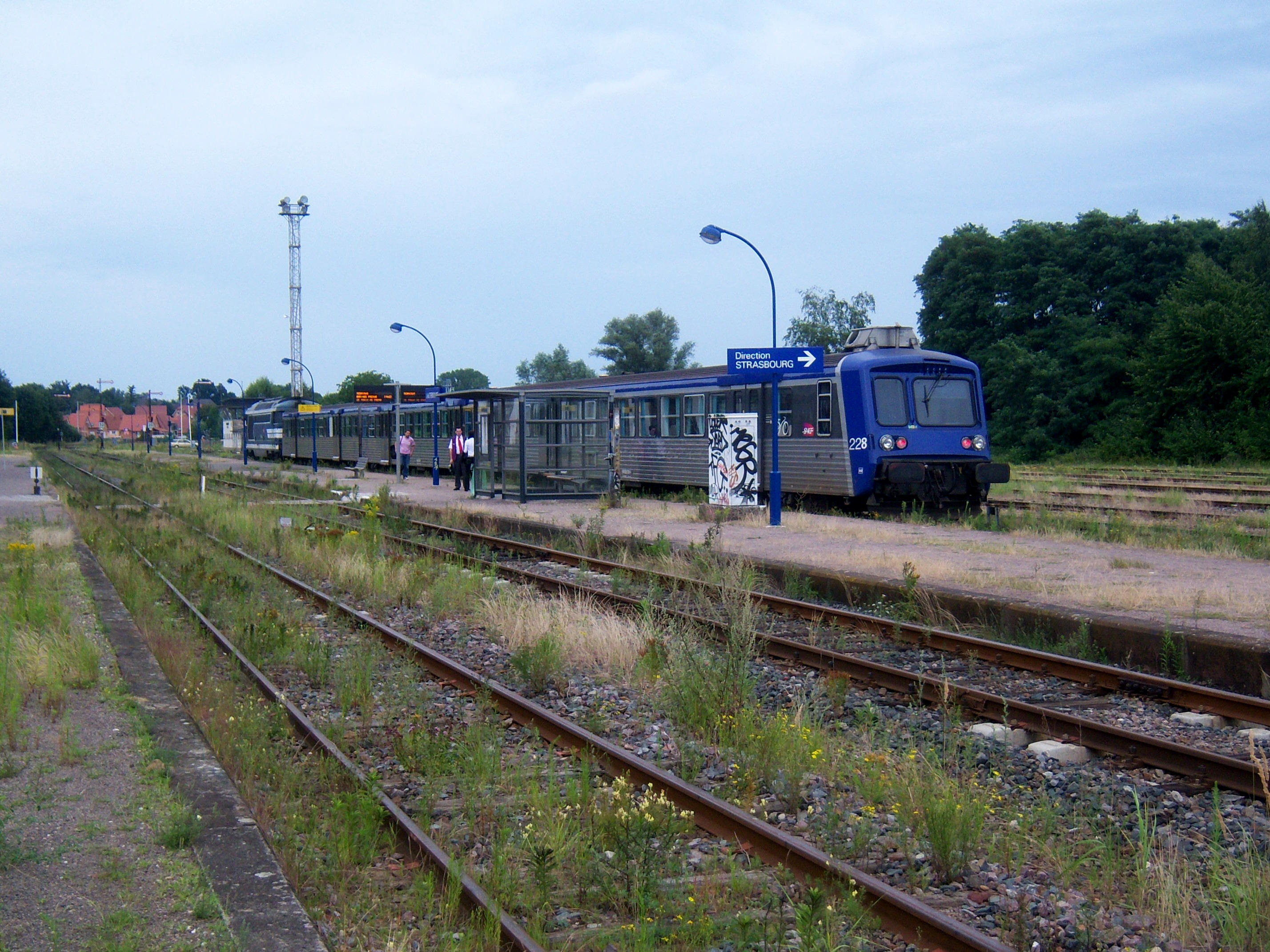
SNCF set from Strasbourg in Lauterbourg

=== Passenger services ===
Today the route is mainly used by local services.

In the 1950s, railcars of class 33.2 based in Landau were used on services between Wörth and Lauterbourg. In the Deutsche Bahn timetable, the section reactivated in 2002 is designated as the Bienwaldbahn and listed under table 677.1. In the timetable of the Karlsruher Verkehrsverbund (Karlsruhe transport association, KVV) and the Verkehrsverbund Rhein-Neckar (Rhine-Neckar transport association, VRN) it is designated with the number R52. The tickets of the KVV and VRN are recognised on the route between Wörth and Lauterbourg. Furthermore, a Rheinland-Pfalz-Ticket can be used the state border to Lauterbourg, but not a Baden-Württemberg-Ticket, a Quer-durchs-Land-Ticket or a Schönes-Wochenende-Ticket. Bombardier Talent (class 643) diesel multiple units are used on the line. On weekdays there are 18 train pairs between 5am and 10pm.

=== Freight operations ===
Freight traffic has always been more important than passenger traffic on the route between Wörth and Lauterbourg.

A freight siding branches off at Hagenbach, mainly for the transport of gravel. The freight traffic is operated by the Albtal-Verkehrs-Gesellschaft (AVG).

At Roppenheim there is a branch to the starch factory of Roquette Frères.
