= Palatine Maximilian Railway Company =

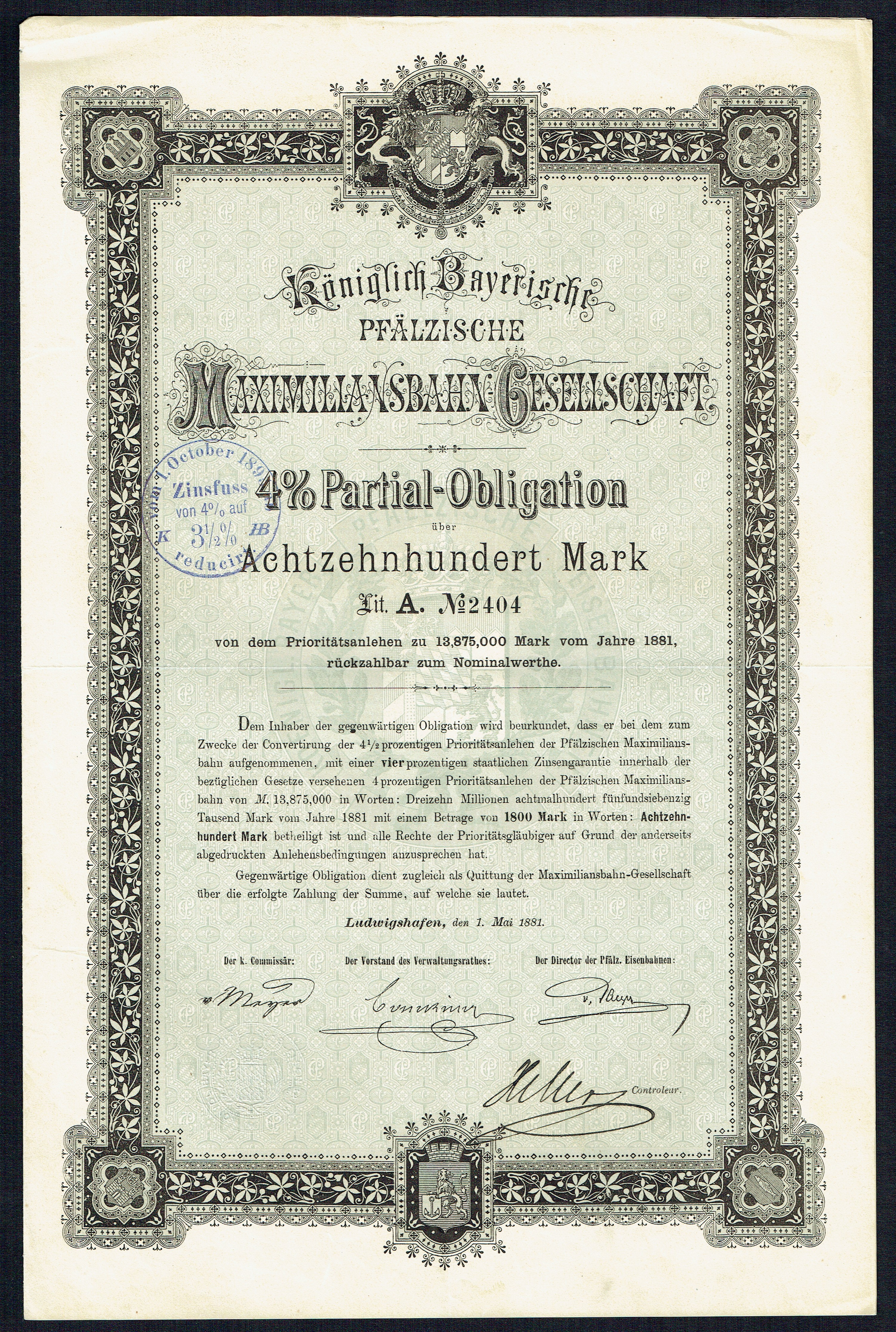
Bond of the Pfälzischen Maximiliansbahn-Gesellschaft, issued 1881

The Palatine Maximilian Railway Company (Pfälzische Maximiliansbahn-Gesellschaft) was a German railway enterprise that acted as the railway operator when the Palatine Maximilian Railway was built.

It managed and ran operations jointly from the outset with the Palatine Ludwig Railway Company. On 1 January 1870 both companies were placed under the combined management of the United Palatine Railways (Vereinigten Pfälzischen Eisenbahnen).

Legally the Palatine Maximilian Railway Company remained in existence. Over the next few years it opened the following new routes:

- Winden – (Bad) Bergzabern, Winden–Bad Bergzabern railway (Kurbadlinie), 10 km, on 10 April 1870
- Landau – Germersheim, Lower Queich Valley Railway (Untere Queichtalbahn), 21 km, on 16 May 1872
- Germersheim – Wörth – Berg – Lauterbourg (now parts of the Schifferstadt–Wörth railway and the Wörth–Strasbourg railway), 40 km, on 25 July 1876
- Rohrbach-Steinweiler–Klingenmünster, Klingbach Valley Railway (Klingbachtalbahn), 10 km, on 1 December 1892
- Landau Hauptbahnhof–Herxheim, 11 km, on 1 December 1898

On 1 January 1909 the organisation was transferred, together with the other two Palatine railway companies, into the Royal Bavarian State Railways.

== See also ==
- Royal Bavarian State Railways
- Palatinate Railway
