= Berg, Germersheim =

Berg
- Municipality
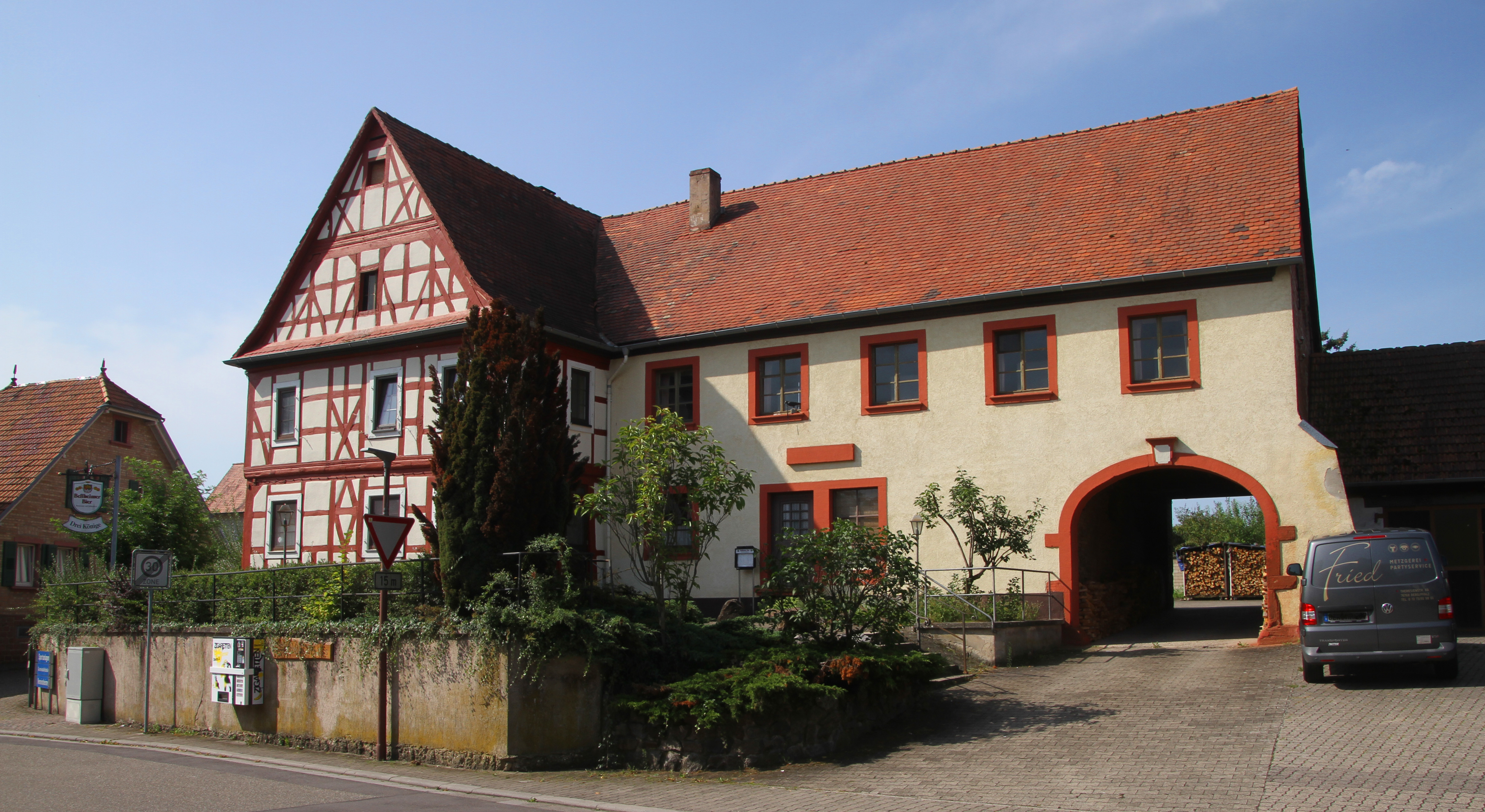

- Coat of arms

- Location of Berg within Germersheim district
- Interactive map of Berg
- Location within Germany Location within Rhineland-Palatinate
- Coordinates: 48°59′N 08°12′E
- Country: Germany
- State: Rhineland-Palatinate
- District: Germersheim
- Municipal assoc.: Hagenbach

Government
  - Mayor (2019–24): Sabine Gerhart

Area
  - Total: 6.76 km^{2} (2.61 sq mi)
- Elevation: 108 m (354 ft)

Population (2025-12-31)
  - Total: 1,935
  - Density: 286/km^{2} (741/sq mi)
- Time zone: UTC+01:00 (CET)
  - Summer (DST): UTC+02:00 (CEST)
- Postal codes: 76768
- Dialling codes: 07273
- Vehicle registration: GER
- Website: www.berg-pfalz.de

Berg (German pronunciation: [bɛʁk]) is a municipality in the district of Germersheim, in Rhineland-Palatinate, Germany. It is situated on the border with France. The Ortsteil Neulauterburg, 2 km west of the centre of Berg, is contiguous with the French town Lauterbourg, across the small river Lauter. Berg has a railway station on the regional line from Wörth am Rhein to Lauterbourg.
