= Scheibenhard =

- Commune
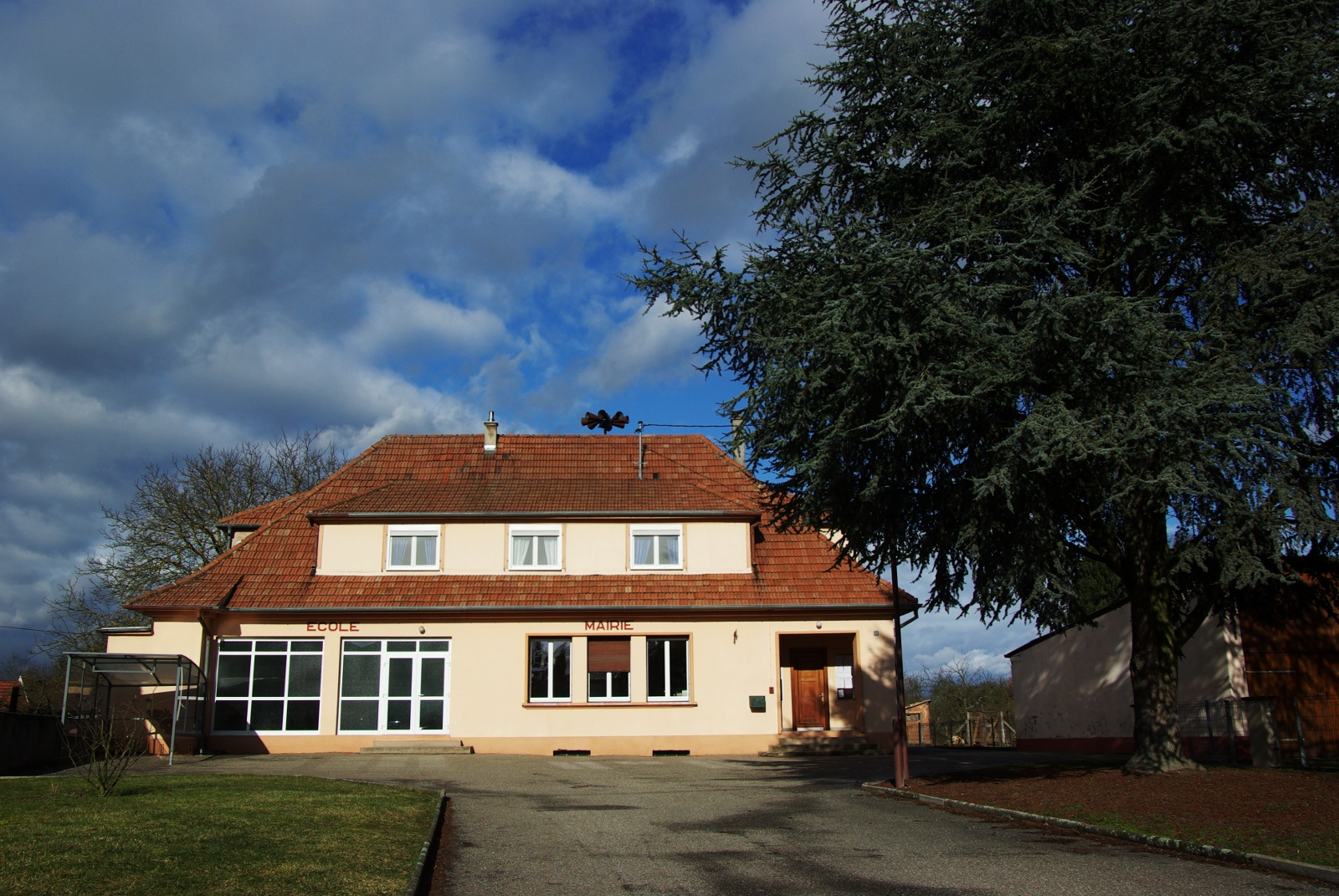
- The town hall in Scheibenhard

- Coat of arms
- Location of Scheibenhard
- Location within France Location within Grand Est
- Coordinates: 48°58′47″N 8°08′16″E
- Country: France
- Region: Grand Est
- Department: Bas-Rhin
- Arrondissement: Haguenau-Wissembourg
- Canton: Wissembourg

Government
  - Mayor (2020–2026): Gérard Helffrich
- Area^{1}: 4.62 km^{2} (1.78 sq mi)
- Highest elevation: 178 m (584 ft)
- Lowest elevation: 115 m (377 ft)
- Population (2023): 871
  - Density: 189/km^{2} (488/sq mi)
- Time zone: UTC+01:00 (CET)
  - Summer (DST): UTC+02:00 (CEST)
- INSEE/Postal code: 67443 /67630
- Website: www.scheibenhard.com
- ^{1} French Land Register data, which excludes lakes, ponds, glaciers > 1 km^{2} (0.386 sq mi or 247 acres) and river estuaries.

Scheibenhard (French pronunciation: [ʃaibənaʁt]) is a commune in the Bas-Rhin department in Grand Est in northeastern France.

It lies on the German border, continuous with the German village of Scheibenhardt, separated only by a small creek, the Lauter.

This creek became the border due to the Vienna Congress of 1815, but from 1870 to 1918 and 1940 till 1945 both sides were annexed by the German Empire/Nazi Germany.

The village is situated near the northeastern corner of France.

== See also ==
- Communes of the Bas-Rhin department
