= Hagenbach (Verbandsgemeinde) =

Verbandsgemeinde in Rhineland-Palatinate

- Verbandsgemeinde
- Location of Hagenbach within Germersheim district
- Interactive map of Hagenbach
- Location within Germany Location within Rhineland-Palatinate
- Coordinates: 49°01′N 8°15′E
- Country: Germany
- State: Rhineland-Palatinate
- District: Germersheim
- Seat: Hagenbach
- Subdivisions: 4 municipalities

Area
  - Total: 33.81 km^{2} (13.05 sq mi)

Population (2025-12-31)
  - Total: 10,361
  - Density: 306.4/km^{2} (793.7/sq mi)
- Time zone: UTC+01:00 (CET)
  - Summer (DST): UTC+02:00 (CEST)
- Website: www.vg-hagenbach.de

Hagenbach is a Verbandsgemeinde ("collective municipality") in the district of Germersheim, Rhineland-Palatinate, Germany. The seat of the Verbandsgemeinde is in Hagenbach.

The Verbandsgemeinde Hagenbach consists of the following Ortsgemeinden ("local municipalities"):

1. Berg
2. Hagenbach
3. Neuburg am Rhein
4. Scheibenhardt
