= Lauterbourg =

Lauterbourg Lüterburi
- Commune
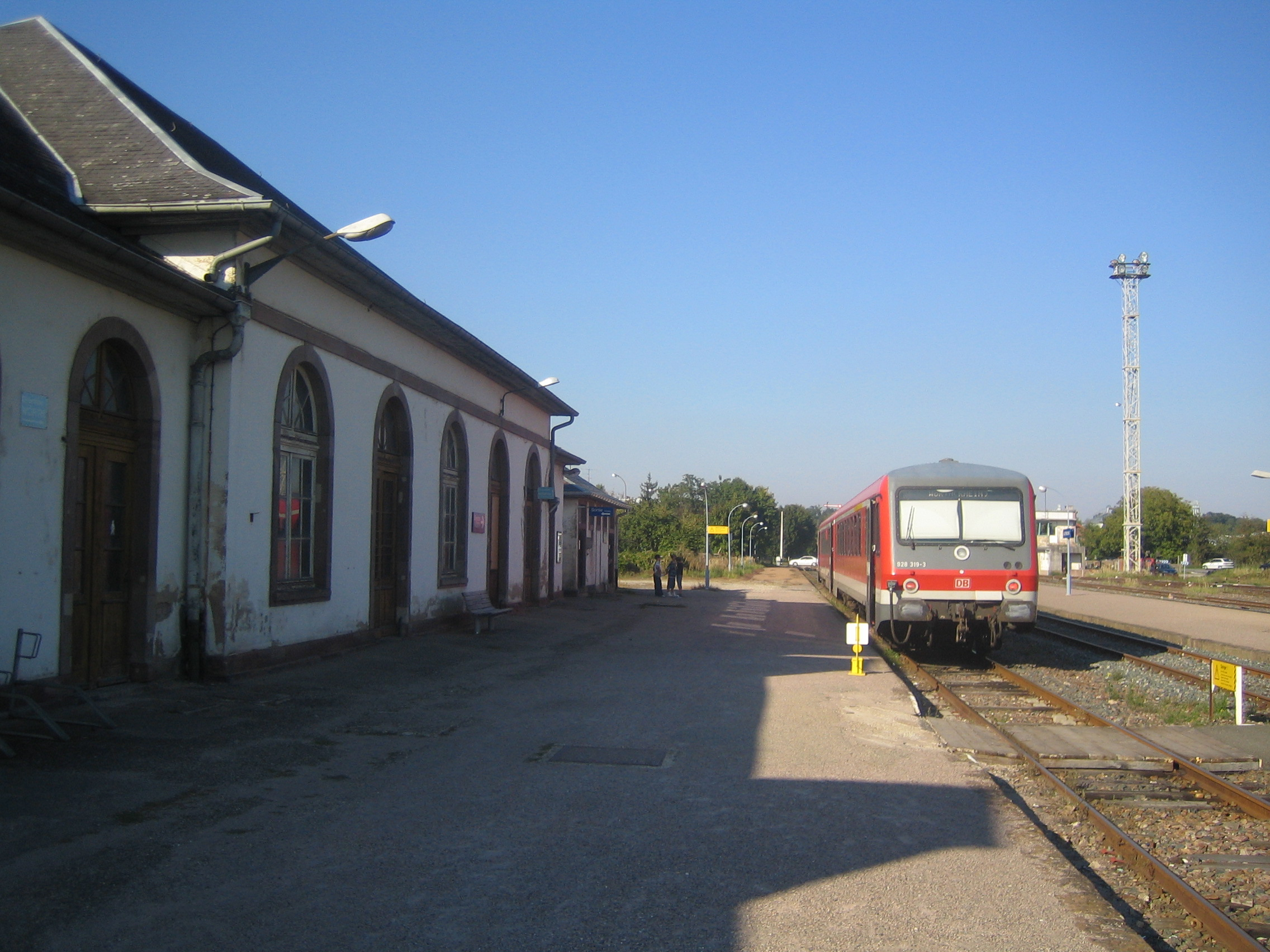
- Railway station with German train

- Coat of arms
- Location of Lauterbourg
- Location within France Location within Grand Est
- Coordinates: 48°58′34″N 8°10′28″E
- Country: France
- Region: Grand Est
- Department: Bas-Rhin
- Arrondissement: Haguenau-Wissembourg
- Canton: Wissembourg

Government
  - Mayor (2022–2026): Joseph Saum
- Area^{1}: 11.25 km^{2} (4.34 sq mi)
- Elevation: 115 m (377 ft)
- Highest elevation: 129 m (423 ft)
- Lowest elevation: 104 m (341 ft)
- Population (2023): 2,324
  - Density: 206.6/km^{2} (535.0/sq mi)
- Time zone: UTC+01:00 (CET)
  - Summer (DST): UTC+02:00 (CEST)
- INSEE/Postal code: 67261 /67630
- ^{1} French Land Register data, which excludes lakes, ponds, glaciers > 1 km^{2} (0.386 sq mi or 247 acres) and river estuaries.

Lauterbourg (French pronunciation: [lotɛʁbuʁ] or [lautəʁbuʁ]; German: Lauterburg; historically in English: Lauterburgh) is a commune and Bas-Rhin department in the Grand Est administrative region in north-eastern France. Situated on the German border and not far from the German city of Karlsruhe, it is the easternmost commune in mainland France. The German town across the border is Neulauterburg.

== Geography ==
Lauterbourg lies near the rivers Lauter and Rhine.

The commune contains several small lakes in the flat land directly on the west of the Rhine, with which they connect.

The commune is the confluence of more than one ecotone: an ecotone between river and agrisystem and one between agrisystem and the forest (Forêt du Bienwald), whose northern edge coincides with the German frontier. The commune is entirely set on the alluvial land fronting the Rhine, but the foothills of the north Vosges Mountains, where the Lauter has its source, are not far away. In anthropological and cultural terms, Lauterbourg is at the meeting point between the two German territories (formerly separate states) of Baden-Württemberg and Rheinland-Pfalz. On the other hand, it is also adjacent to a major river and land route which for centuries has been a focus of commercial and cultural currents, but also of major military currents in times of war.

Lauterbourg is connected by a railway line with Strasbourg to the south and Wörth am Rhein to the north. The town has had its own railway station since 1876, and since the reversion of Alsace to French control it has been connected to both the French and German rail networks. The lines have never been electrified, however, and in recent decades the trains have been diesel powered.

Close by, to the west, is the northern end of the A35 Autoroute, the principal north-south highway in Alsace which links to Strasbourg and, beyond that, Mulhouse and Basel (St Louis). A linking autobahn to the north has not been constructed, but there is a narrow road running north through Germany towards the Autobahn network, linking to nearby cities such as Ludwigshafen and Karlsruhe.

Spring and Autumn are pleasant in Lauterbourg. Summers are warm with the occasional afternoon thunderstorm. Winter can be very cold. Lauterbourg is one of the coldest low lying places in France and can experience cold east winds most Winters.

== History ==
Lauterbourg is the site of a Roman era fortification named Tribuni, abandoned in AD 405. The area was settled by the Franks in the 6th century. Lauterbourg fell to Lotharingia in 843, and was incorporated into the Holy Roman Empire in 962. Adelheid, the wife of Otto I, founded a monastery in Seltz, a short distance to the south of Lauterbourg. Lauterbourg was given to the bishopric of Speyer by Henry IV. Lauterbourg developed into a town, and the seat of a bailiwick incorporating 20 villages, in the 13th century.

In the early 18th century, Lauter, as developed into a French fortification of the Lauter-line, defined as the border of France in the Congress of Vienna of 1815. On 13 August 13, 1793, a battle of the War of the First Coalition took place in the Bienwald.

After the Franco-Prussian War of 1871, Lauterbourg passed to the German Empire. Lauterbourg was now developed industrially and attached to a railway line. After World War I, the town passed to the French Third Republic. In the 1930s, Lauterbourg was in an uncomfortable position between the Maginot and Siegfried-lines. Its population was evacuated immediately upon the outbreak of World War II. In May 1940, the lower town was destroyed completely. Part of its population returned to Lauterbourg in 1942. There was an attempt at taking Lauterbourg on 15 December 1944 by the US 79th Infantry Division, who were forced to hold out against Operation Nordwind until the German offensive was stopped on 25 January 1945. Lauterbourg was taken by the French 1st Army and U.S. VI Corps on 19 March 1945 after assaulting the Siegfried Line fortifications in the Bienwald during a week of heavy combat.

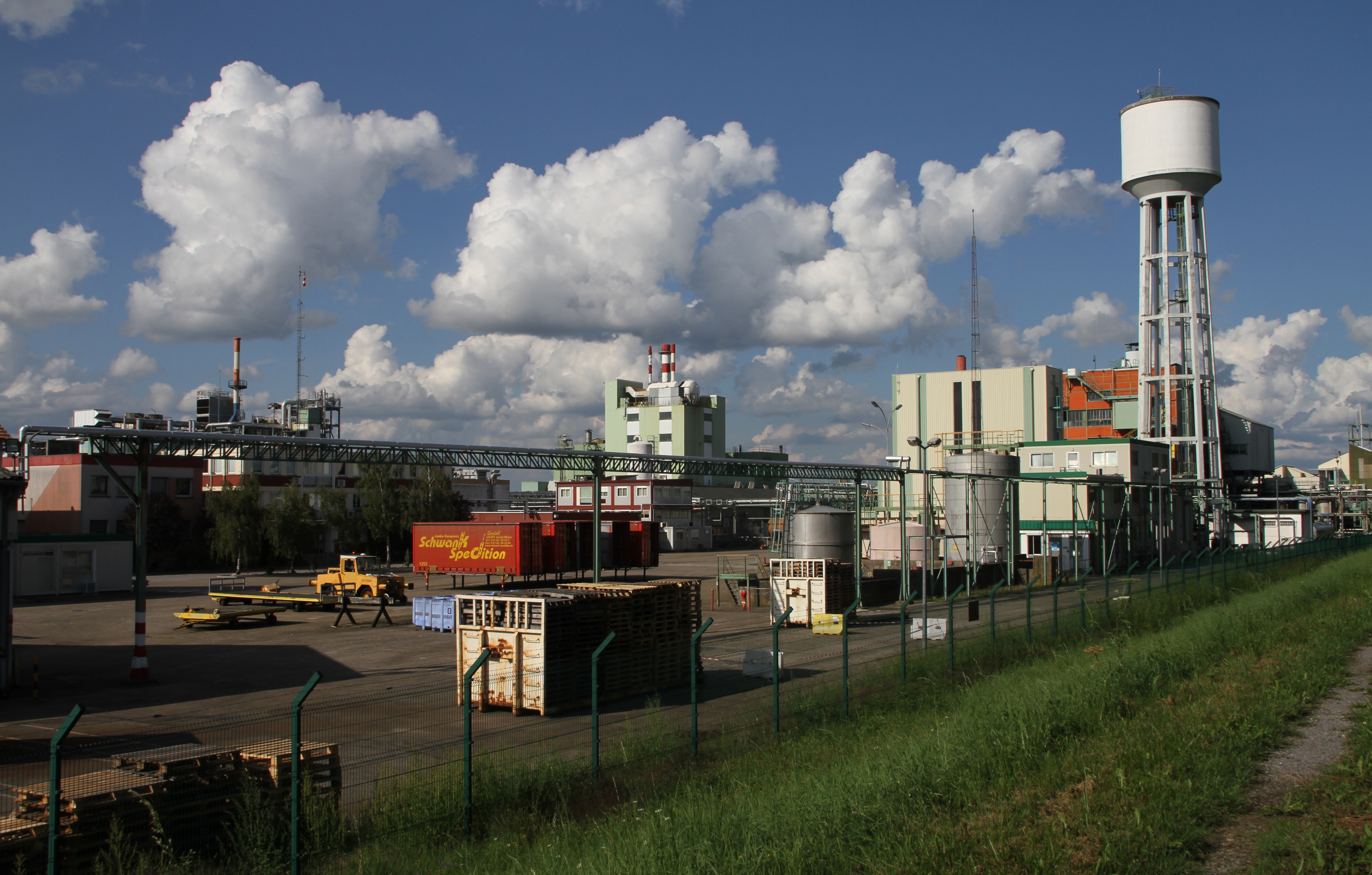
Harbour

The town was rebuilt after the war. Lauterbourg now has a metal works, a chemical factory and a fertilizer factory. Other significant businesses include a car delivery firm, whose activities include transferring cars between the railway depot and the harbour, and a large gravel works. The harbour on the Rhine also provides employment. The harbour is almost exclusively devoted to goods transport, including the delivery of raw materials by river tanker for the chemical and fertilizer factories and the transportation of bridge sections and other smaller sub-assemblies for the metal business.

In the 2006/2007 season, ASL Lauterbourg, the local rugby football team, won the Alsace championship league.

== Population ==
Historical population
Year	Pop.	±% p.a.
1968	2,261	—
1975	2,442	+1.11%
1982	2,467	+0.15%
1990	2,372	−0.49%
1999	2,269	−0.49%
2007	2,216	−0.30%
2012	2,234	+0.16%
2017	2,304	+0.62%
2023	2,324	+0.14%
Source: INSEE

== Monuments ==
- Château épiscopal de Lauterbourg

== Notable people ==
- Leopold Caspari, businessman from Natchitoches and a member of both houses of the Louisiana State Legislature between 1884 and 1914, was born in Lauterbourg in 1830.
- Pierre Joseph Étienne Finck (1797–1870), French mathematician.

== See also ==
- Communes of the Bas-Rhin department
