= Pierre Joseph Étienne Finck =

French mathematician (1797–1870)

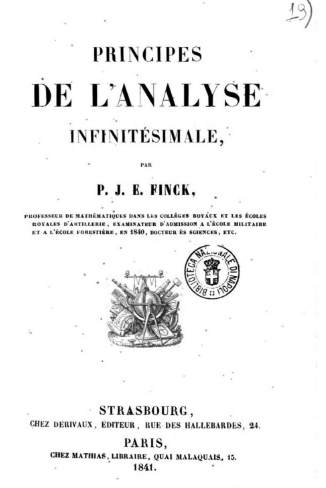
- Front page of Principes de l'analyse infinitésimale (1841)
- Born: 15 October 1797; Lauterbourg, France
- Died: 27 July 1870 (aged 72); Strasbourg, France
- Education: École Polytechnique
- Known for: Euclidean algorithm
- Scientific career
- Fields: Mathematics
- Workplaces: University of Strasbourg

Pierre Joseph Étienne Finck (1797–1870) was a French mathematician.

== Life and work ==
Finck, who became orphan at twelve years, was educated by a merchant of Landau (Pfalz). In 1815, he entered in the École Polytechnique, where he graduated in 1817. After some time studying in the Artillery School, he left París for Strasbourg before 1821.

From 1825 he was professor in the Artillery School of Strasburg and, simultaneously, professor of special mathematics in the Collége de Strasbourg. In 1842 he was appointed adjunct professor of applied mathematics in the University of Strasbourg where he was appointed full professor in 1847.

From 1862 he began to suffer from ill health. He was intellectually diminished, and he was forced to take sick leave in 1866. He retired in 1868.

Finck wrote seven text books on algebra, geometry, mechanics and calculus, and more than twenty articles published in the Journal de Mathematiques Pures et Appliquees, in the Annales de Gergone and in the Comptes rendus of the French Academy of Sciences.

== Bibliography ==
- Heck, André (2012). "Historical Examples of Lobbying: The Case of Strasbourg Astronomical Observatories". In André Hech (ed.). Organizations, People and Strategies in Astronomy - Volume 1. Venngeist. pp. 295–318. ISBN 978-2-9542677-0-8.
- Shallit, Jeffrey (1994). "Origins of the analysis of the Euclidean algorithm". Historia Mathematica. 21 (4): 401–419. doi:10.1006/hmat.1994.1031. ISSN 0315-0860.
