= Scheibenhardt =

- Municipality
- Coat of arms

- Location of Scheibenhardt within Germersheim district
- Interactive map of Scheibenhardt
- Location within Germany Location within Rhineland-Palatinate
- Coordinates: 48°59′N 8°8′E
- Country: Germany
- State: Rhineland-Palatinate
- District: Germersheim
- Municipal assoc.: Hagenbach

Government
  - Mayor (2019–24): Edwin Diesel (CDU)

Area
  - Total: 2.88 km^{2} (1.11 sq mi)
- Elevation: 123 m (404 ft)

Population (2025-12-31)
  - Total: 611
  - Density: 212/km^{2} (549/sq mi)
- Time zone: UTC+01:00 (CET)
  - Summer (DST): UTC+02:00 (CEST)
- Postal codes: 76779
- Dialling codes: 07277
- Vehicle registration: GER
- Website: www.scheibenhardt.de

Scheibenhardt (German pronunciation: [ˈʃaɪbn̩ˌhaʁt]) is a German municipality located in the state of Rhineland-Palatinate. In 2004 it had 714 inhabitants. Situated on the border with Alsace, it is continuous with the French village of Scheibenhard, separated only by a small creek called the Lauter.
