= Château épiscopal de Lauterbourg =

Coordinates: 48.9749°N 8.1768°E

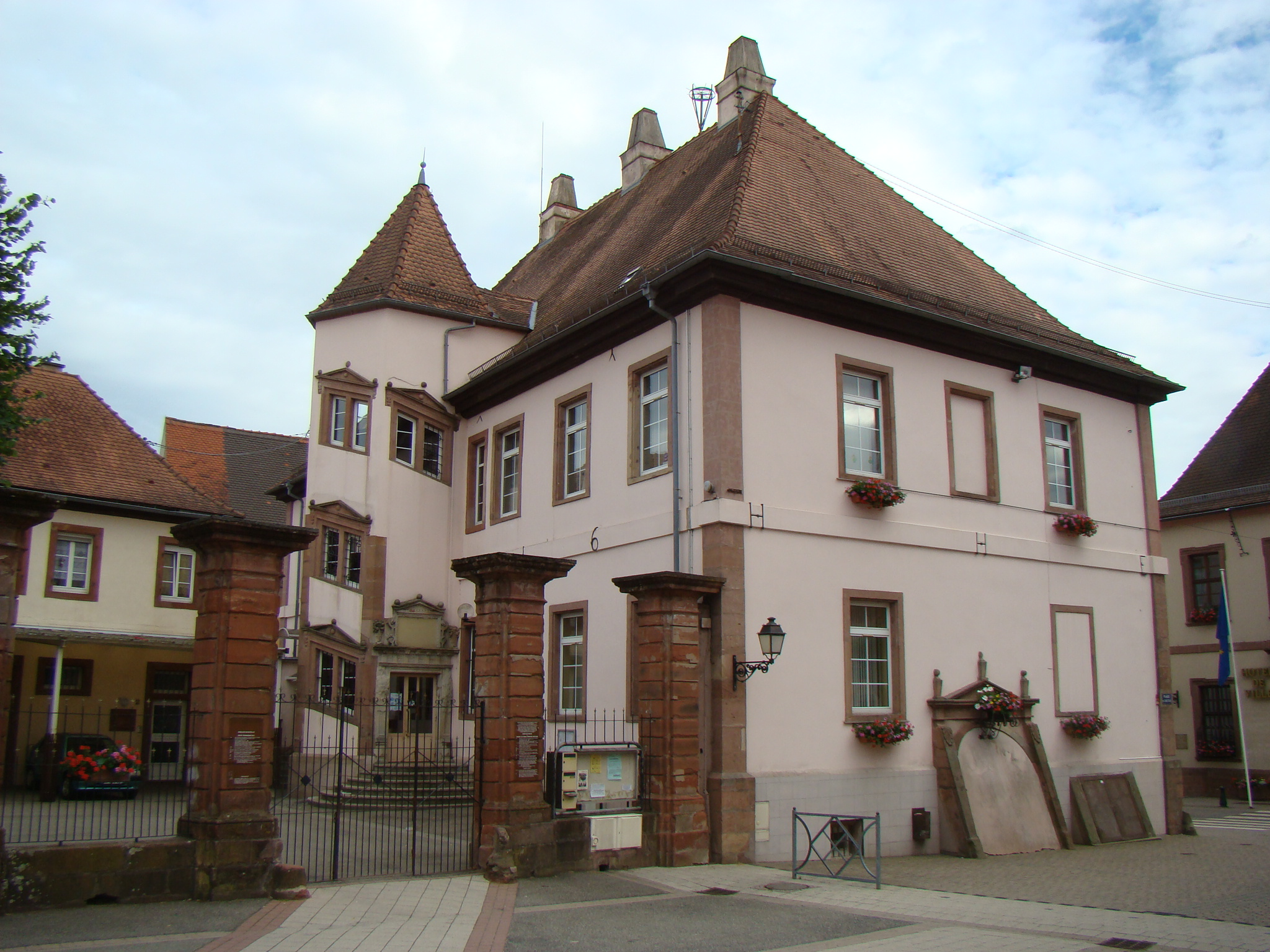
The Bishop's Residence, Lauterbourg

Château épiscopal de Lauterbourg is a monumental building in the town of Lauterbourg, in the department of Bas-Rhin, Alsace, France. It was built at the end of the 16th century, and served as a residence of the bishop of Speyer. It is a listed historical monument since 1932.
