= Lauter (Rhine) =

River in Germany and France

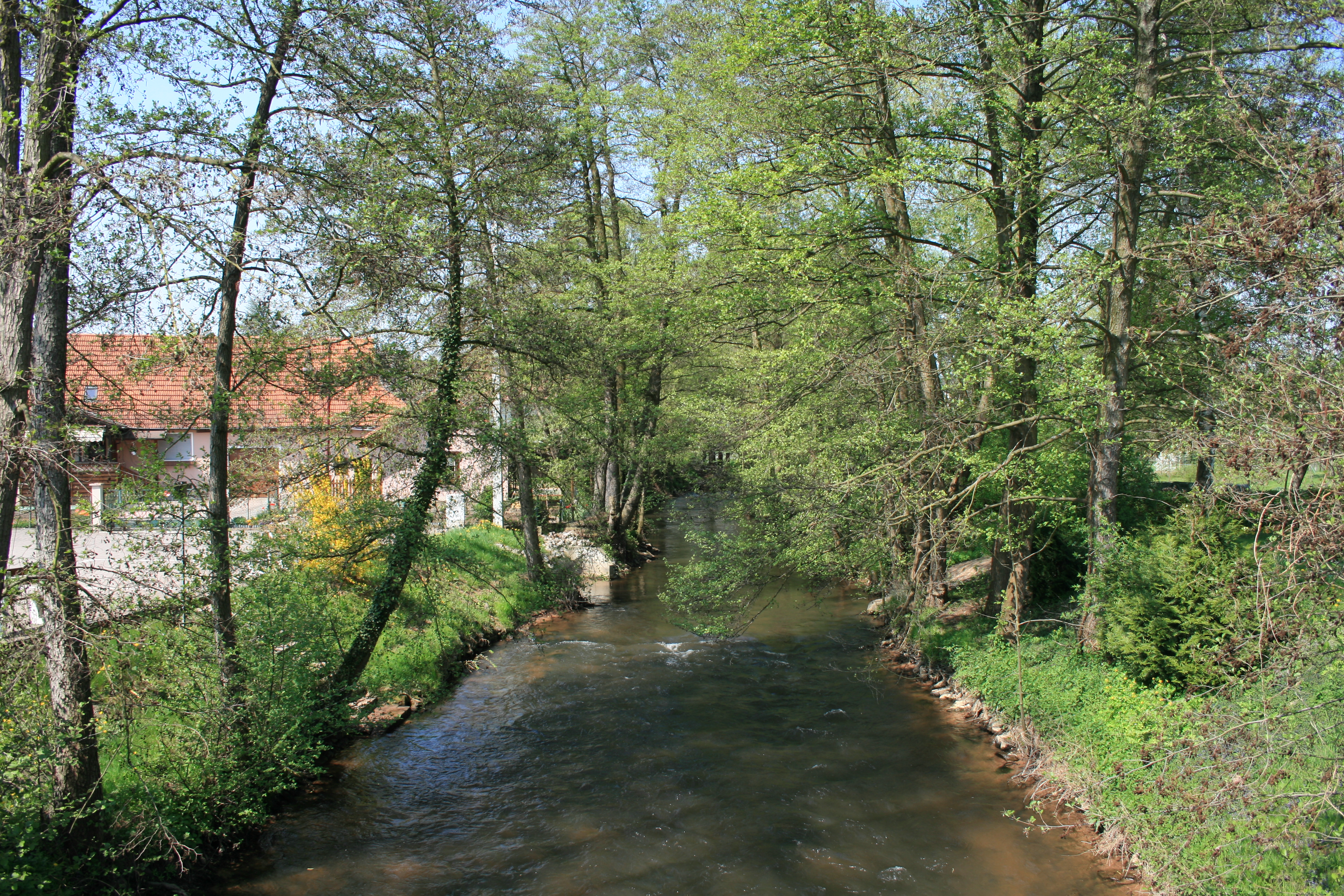
- The Lauter between Scheibenhard and Scheibenhardt

- Location within France Location within Grand Est

Location
- Countries: Germany and France

Physical characteristics
- Source
  - location: Palatine Forest
- Mouth
  - location: Rhine
  - coordinates: 48°59′6″N 8°16′4″E
- Length: 55 km (34 mi)

Basin features
- Progression: Rhine→ North Sea

The Lauter (German pronunciation: [ˈlaʊtɐ]; in its upper course also: Wieslauter) is a river in Germany and France.

The Lauter is a left tributary of the Rhine. Its length is 55 kilometres (34 mi), of which 39 km is in France and on the France–Germany border. It is formed by the confluence of two headstreams (Scheidbach and Wartenbach) north of Hinterweidenthal in the Palatine Forest in the German state of Rhineland-Palatinate. It flows through Dahn, crosses the border with France, flows through Wissembourg, and then forms the French-German international boundary until its confluence with the Rhine near Lauterbourg and Neuburg am Rhein.

== See also ==
- Lines of Wissembourg
- List of rivers of France
- List of rivers of Rhineland-Palatinate
