= Hagenbach =

- Town
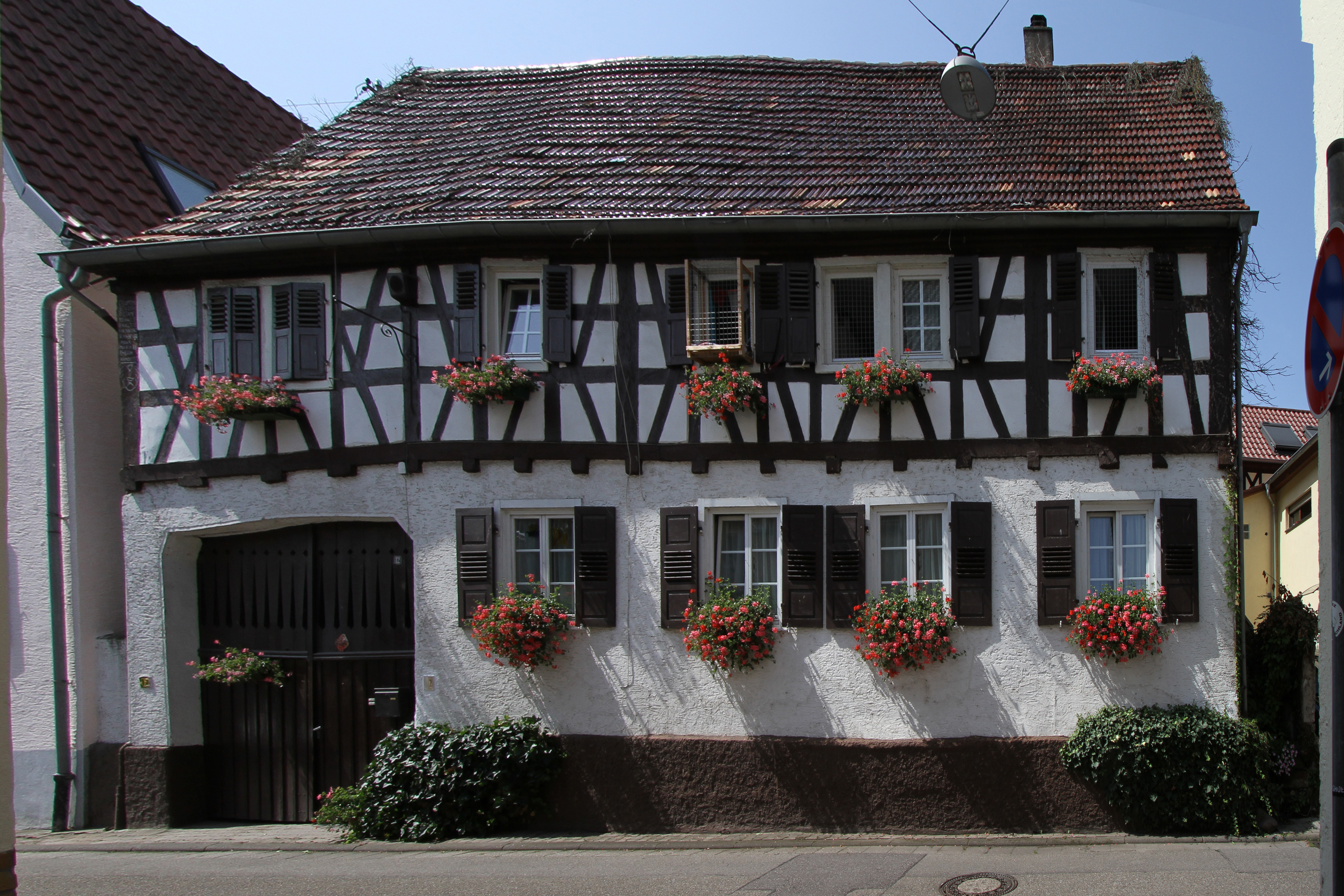

- Coat of arms

- Location of Hagenbach within Germersheim district
- Interactive map of Hagenbach
- Location within Germany Location within Rhineland-Palatinate
- Coordinates: 49°01′14″N 8°14′54″E
- Country: Germany
- State: Rhineland-Palatinate
- District: Germersheim
- Municipal assoc.: Hagenbach

Government
  - Mayor (2019–24): Christian Hutter (CDU)

Area
  - Total: 15.86 km^{2} (6.12 sq mi)
- Elevation: 104 m (341 ft)

Population (2025-12-31)
  - Total: 5,295
  - Density: 333.9/km^{2} (864.7/sq mi)
- Time zone: UTC+01:00 (CET)
  - Summer (DST): UTC+02:00 (CEST)
- Postal codes: 76767
- Dialling codes: 07273
- Vehicle registration: GER
- Website: www.hagenbach.de

Hagenbach (German pronunciation: [ˈhaːɡn̩ˌbax]) is a town in the district of Germersheim, in Rhineland-Palatinate, Germany. It is situated near the border with France, on the left bank of the Rhine, approx. 10 km west of Karlsruhe.

Hagenbach is the seat of the Verbandsgemeinde ("collective municipality") Hagenbach.
