= Lauterbourg station =

Railway station in France

Lauterbourg
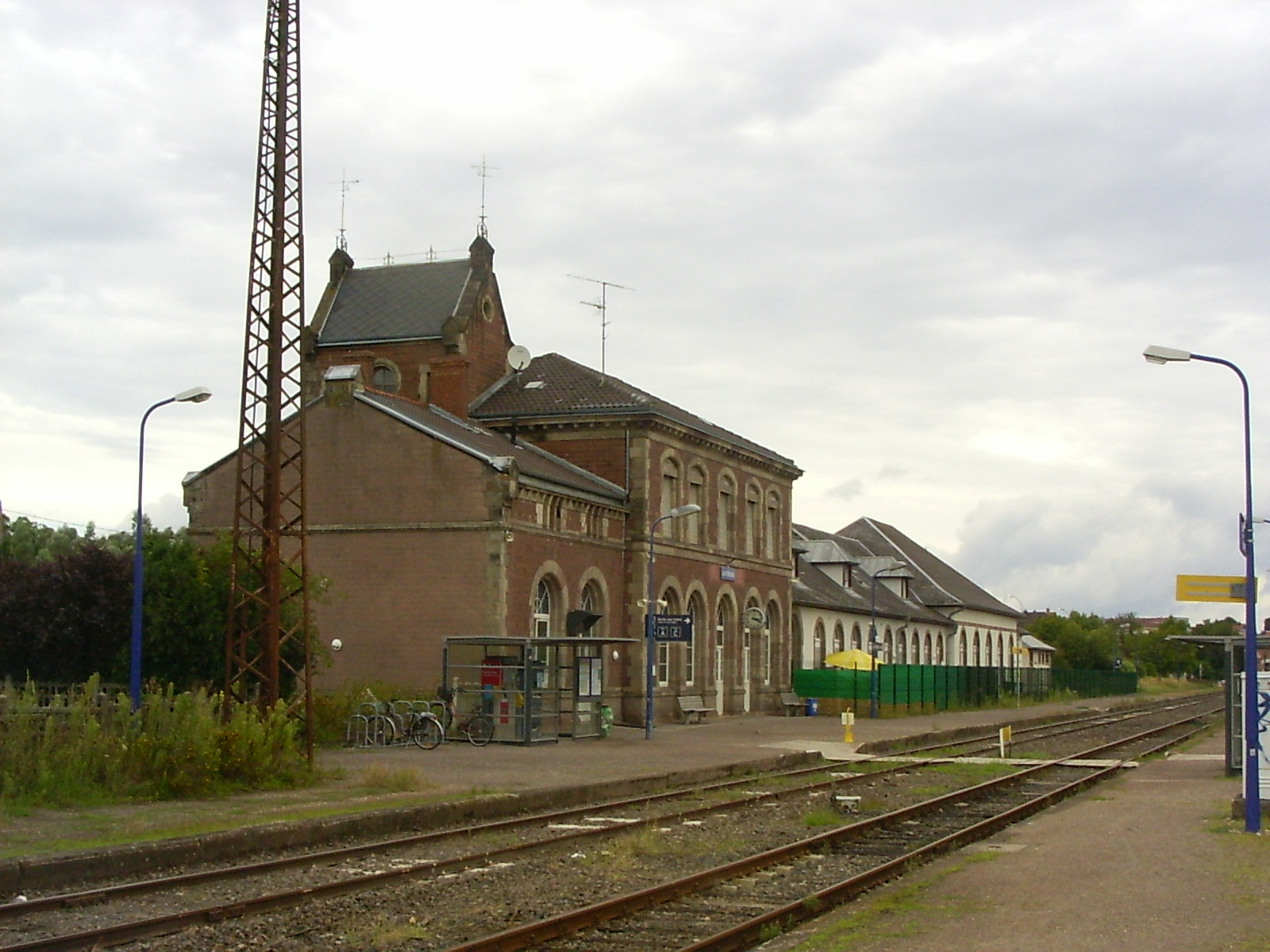
- Station building, platforms and tracks of Lauterbourg station.

General information
- Location: Place de la Gare, Lauterbourg, Bas-Rhin, Grand Est, France
- Coordinates: 48°58′03″N 8°10′59″E
- Line: Strasbourg–Wörth railway
- Platforms: 1 island platform; 1 side platform
- Tracks: 3

Other information
- Station code: 87212464

History
- Opened: 25 June 1876

Services
Preceding station	DB Regio Mitte	Following station
Berg (Pfalz) towards Wörth (Rhein)	RB 52	Terminus
Preceding station	TER Grand Est	Following station
Mothern towards Strasbourg	A09	Terminus
Location
- Location within France Location within Europe

Lauterbourg station (French: Gare de Lauterbourg) is a railway station in the town of Lauterbourg in the département of Bas-Rhin in the French region of Grand Est.

It is on the SNCF and the TER Grand Est networks and is served by regional express trains. As a border station, it is also served by Deutsche Bahn trains.

== Location ==
Lauterbourg station is 111 metres above sea level and located at kilometric point 55.493 on the line from Strasbourg to Lauterbourg, between Mothern and the Franco-German border. It is connected to the German railway network by the Bienwaldbahn (Bienwaldbahn).

It is at the junction to the short Lauterbourg Port railway and was the terminus of the former Lauterbourg–Wissembourg railway.

== History ==
Construction of the Lauterbourg railway station began in 1874 after the German Empire annexed Alsace-Lorraine in 1871. The line from Strasbourg to Lauterbourg was opened on 25 July 1876 by the Imperial Railways in Alsace-Lorraine (Kaiserliche Generaldirektion der Eisenbahnen in Elsaß-Lothringen).

In 1900, the station was enlarged for the opening of the new Lauterbourg–Wissembourg railway, which was put in service on 1 July of the same year.

The Riviera-Express of the Compagnie des wagons-lits, connecting Berlin to Nice via Frankfurt, served the station from 3 December 1900. It was abandoned when the First World War broke out

On 19 June 1919, the station became part of the network of the Administration des chemins de fer d'Alsace et de Lorraine (AL), as a result of the Allied victory in the First World War.

The station was extended in 1920; the work included the building of a customs office.

On 1 January 1938, the SNCF took control of the railway installations of Lauterbourg. However, after the annexation of Alsace-Lorraine by Germany on 1 July 1940 during the Second World War, Deutsche Reichsbahn controlled the station and held it until the liberation of France (in 1944 –1945).

Passenger services towards Wissembourg ended on 1 October 1947.

Lauterbourg also had a minor locomotive depot.

In 2014, the SNCF estimated the number of passengers using the station at 22,502 passengers.

== Passenger services ==
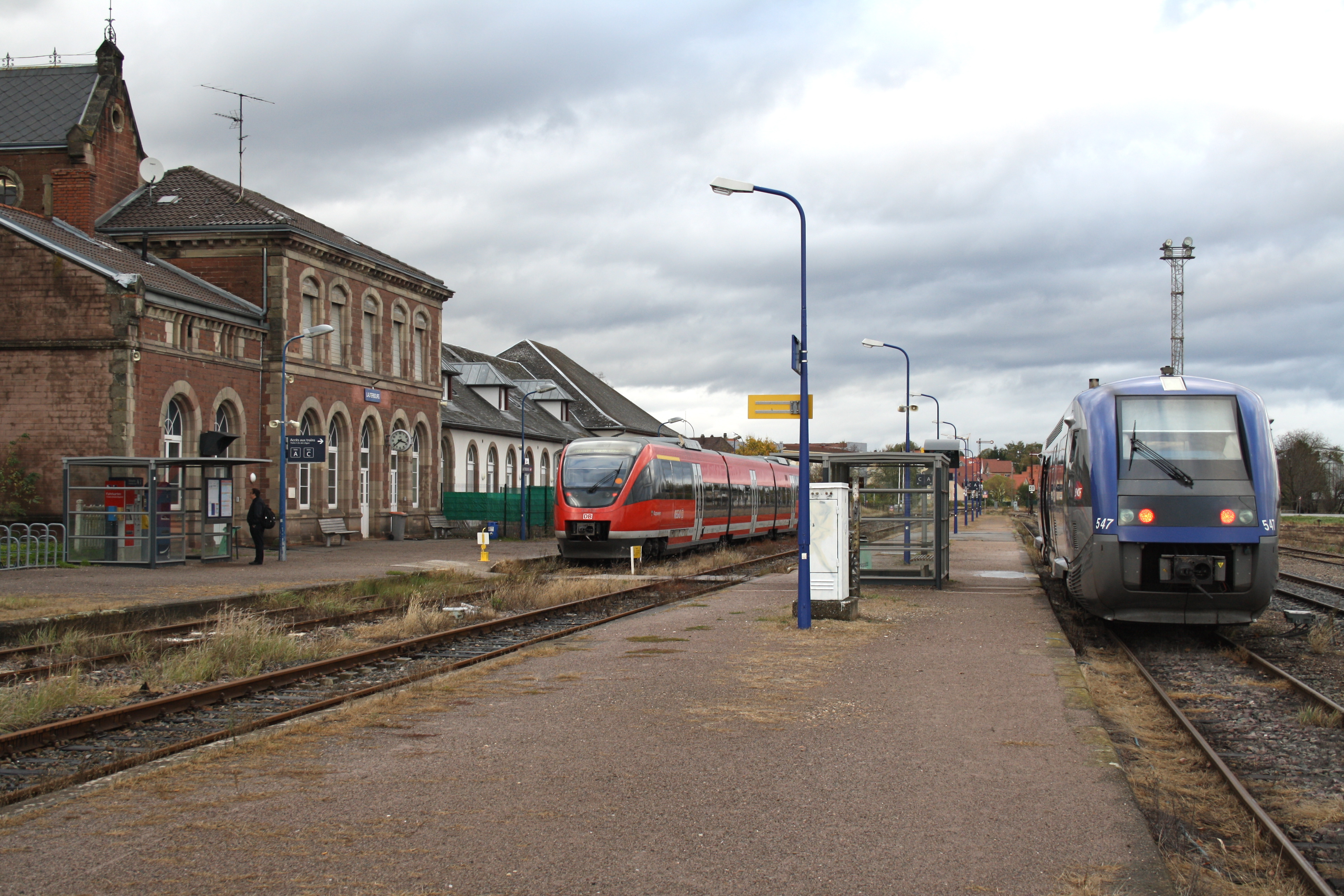
French and German trains in Lauterbourg station.

=== Facilities ===
The station is unstaffed and has open access to the platforms. It is equipped with a ticket machine for the purchase of regional tickets. There is an island platform and a side platform serving three tracks.

=== Services ===
Lauterbourg is a stop on the TER Alsace network, served by regional express trains on the Strasbourg-Ville–Lauterbourg route.

It is also served by German regional trains (Regionalbahn) of the Wörth (Rhein)–Lauterbourg route.

=== Other modes ===
There is parking for bikes and vehicles at the station.

It is served by the buses of autocars TER on the Rœschwoog (station)–Seltz (station)–Lauterbourg (station) route and the interurban buses of Réseau 67 on the Lauterbourg–Wissembourg route (line 314).

== Gallery ==
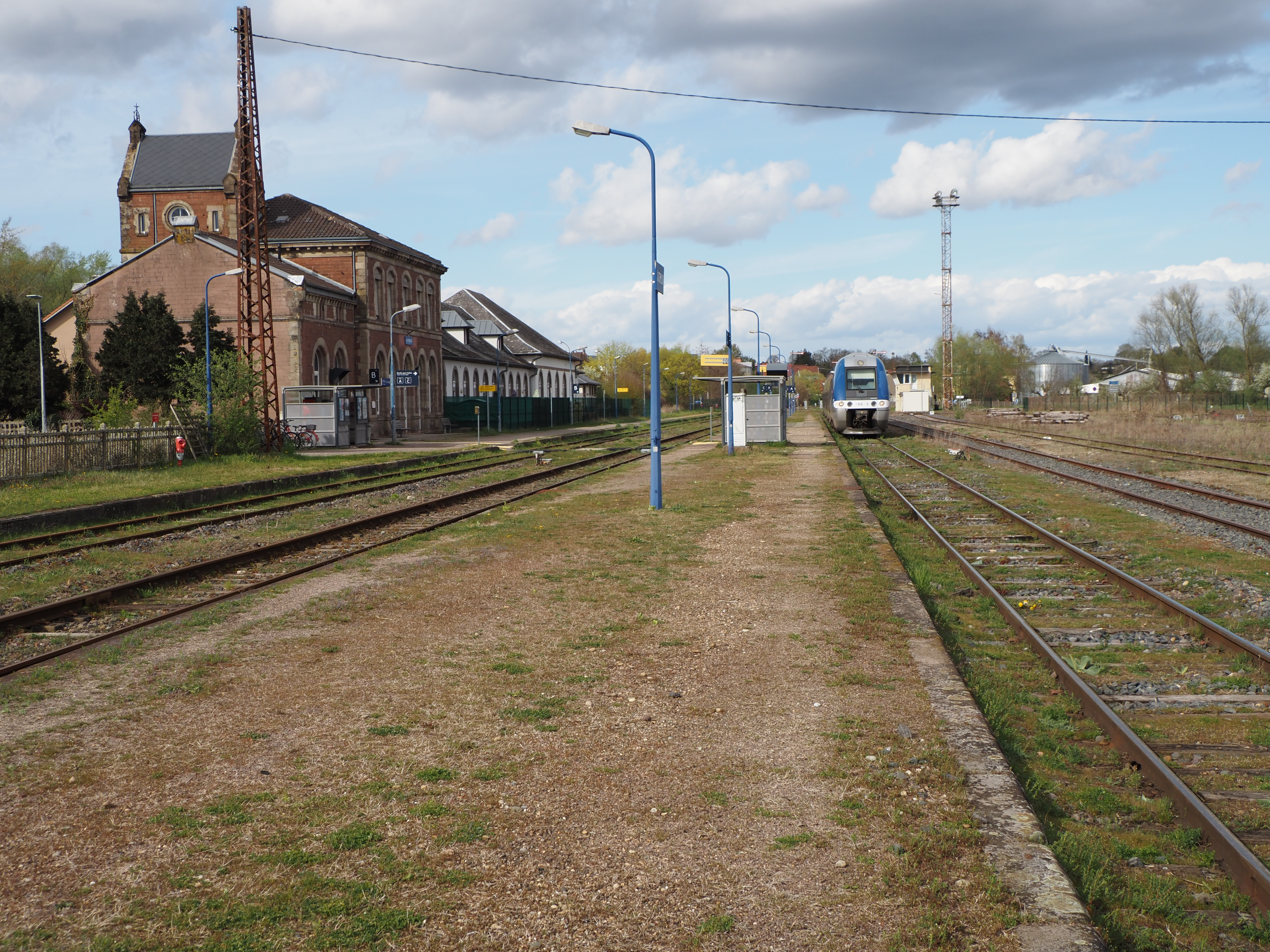
Gare de Lauterbourg, plattform

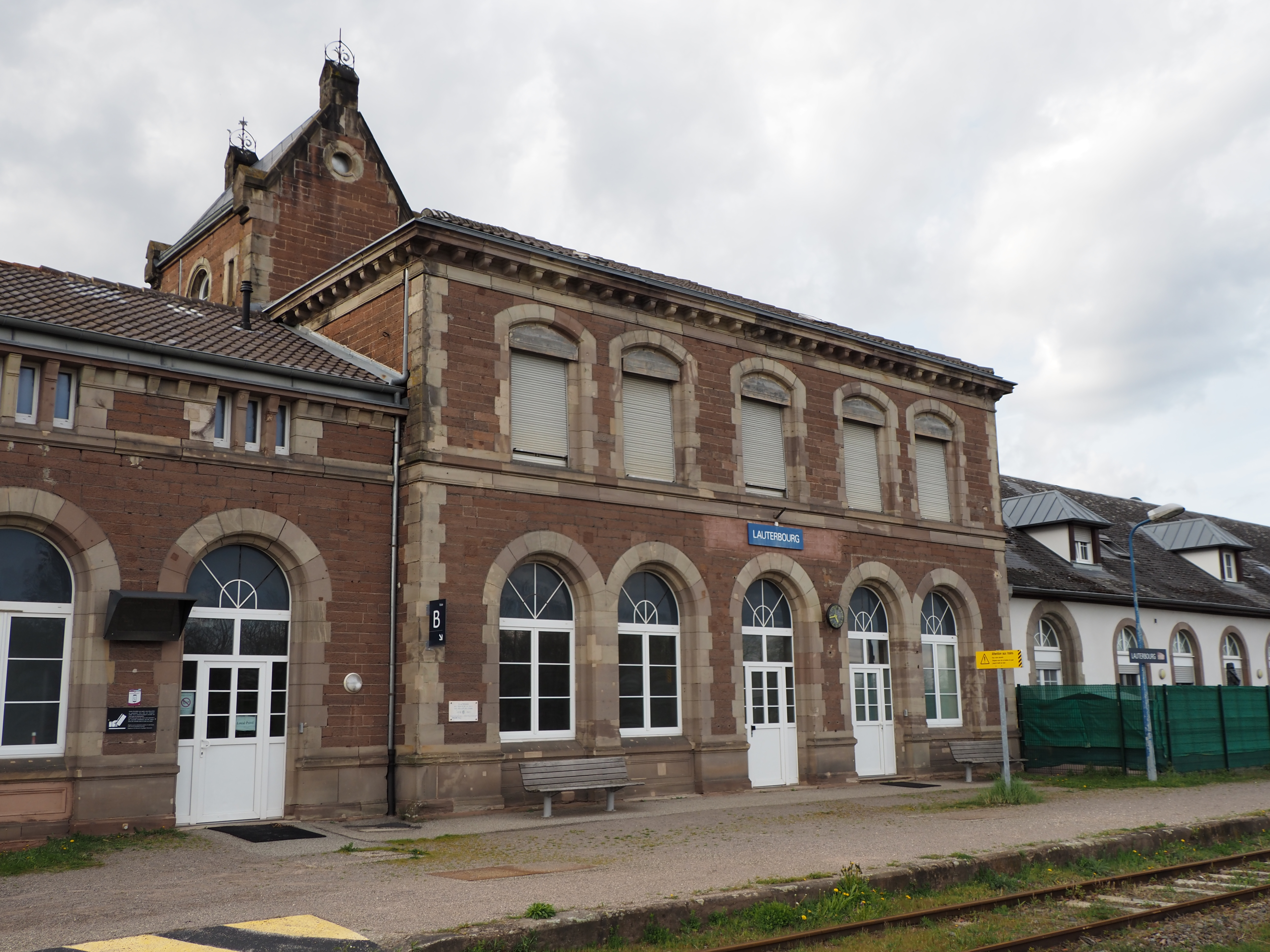
Gare de Lauterbourg, station building

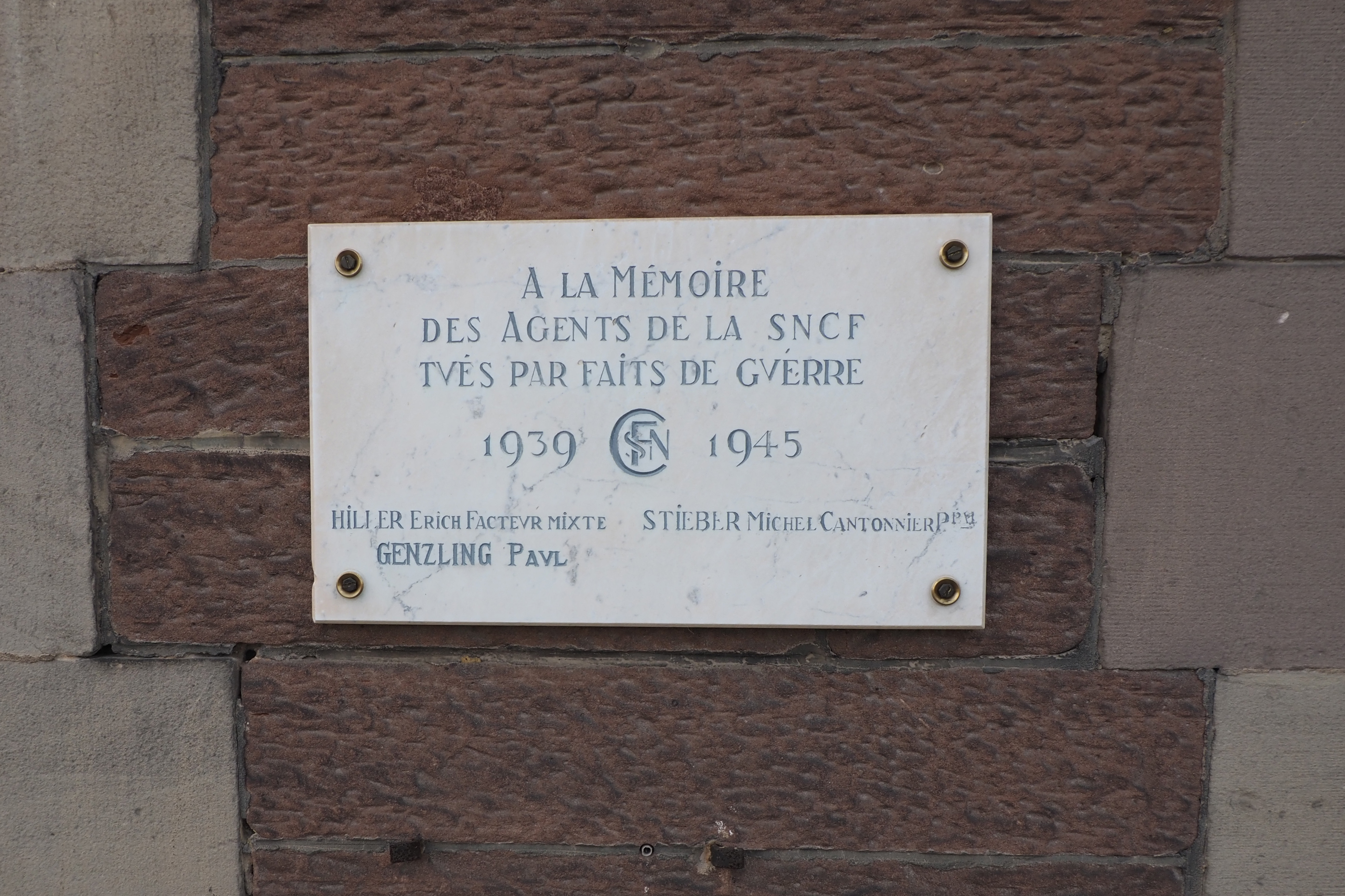
In memory of...

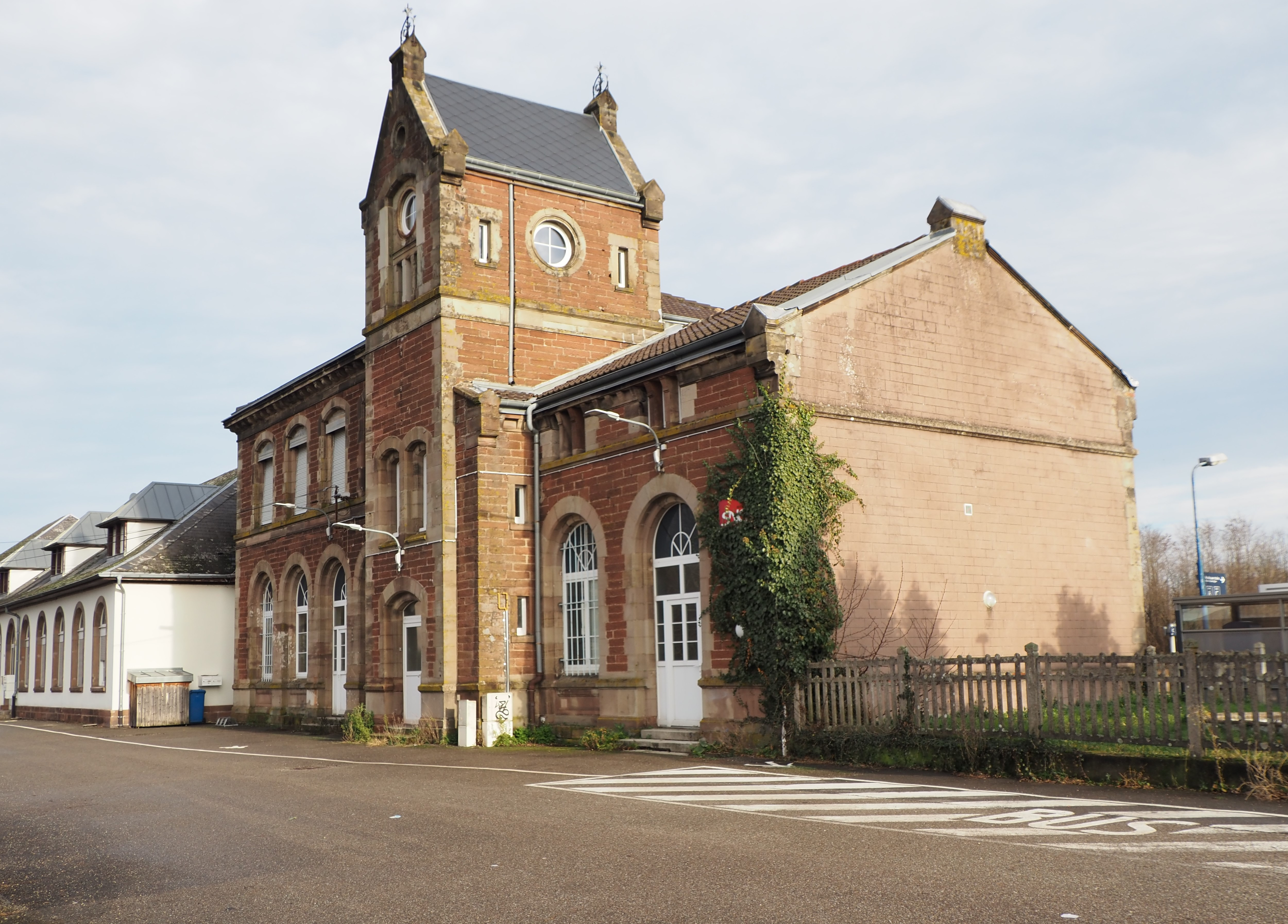
Gare de Lauterbourg, streetside

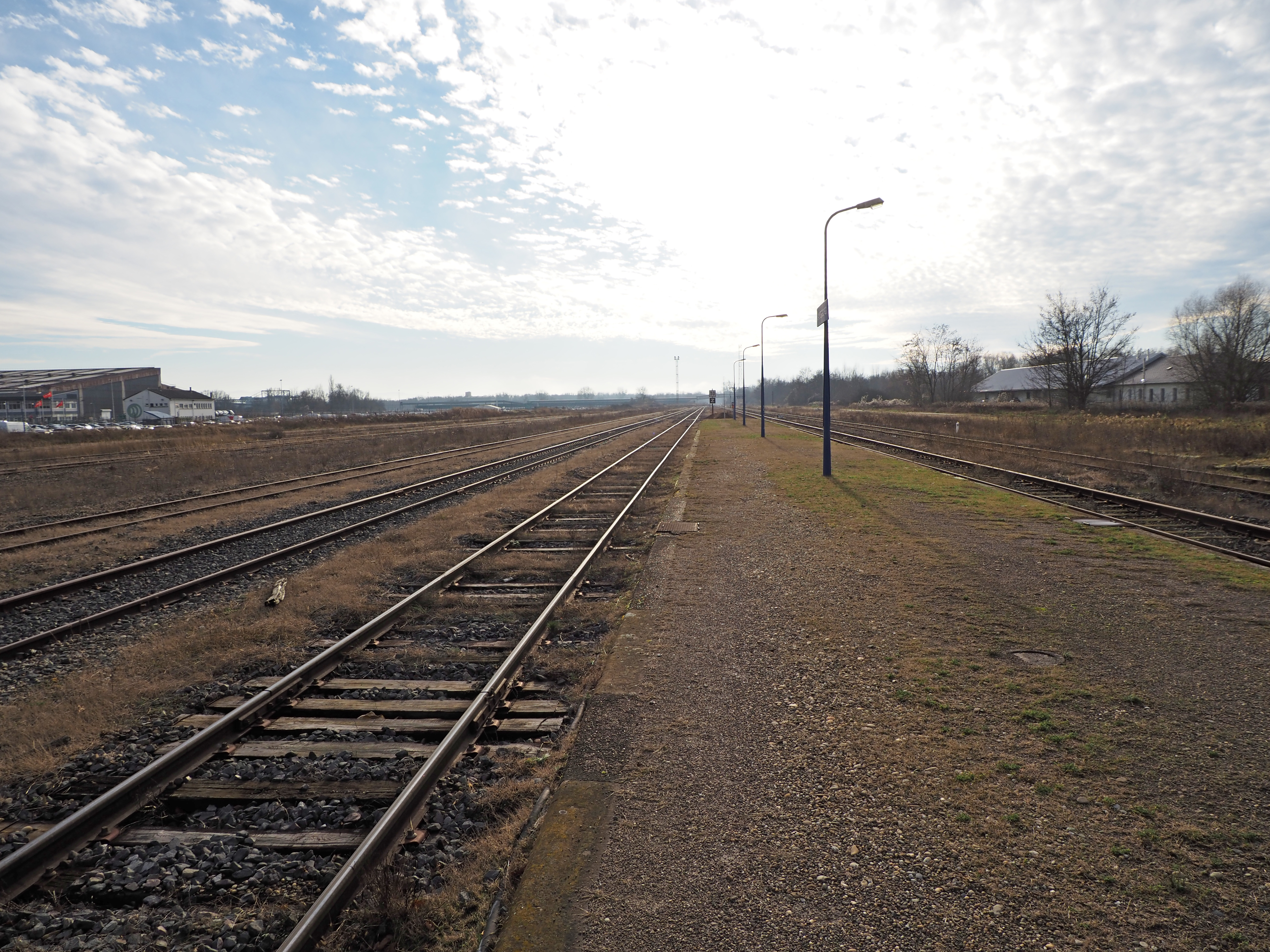
Lauterbourg, trackarea

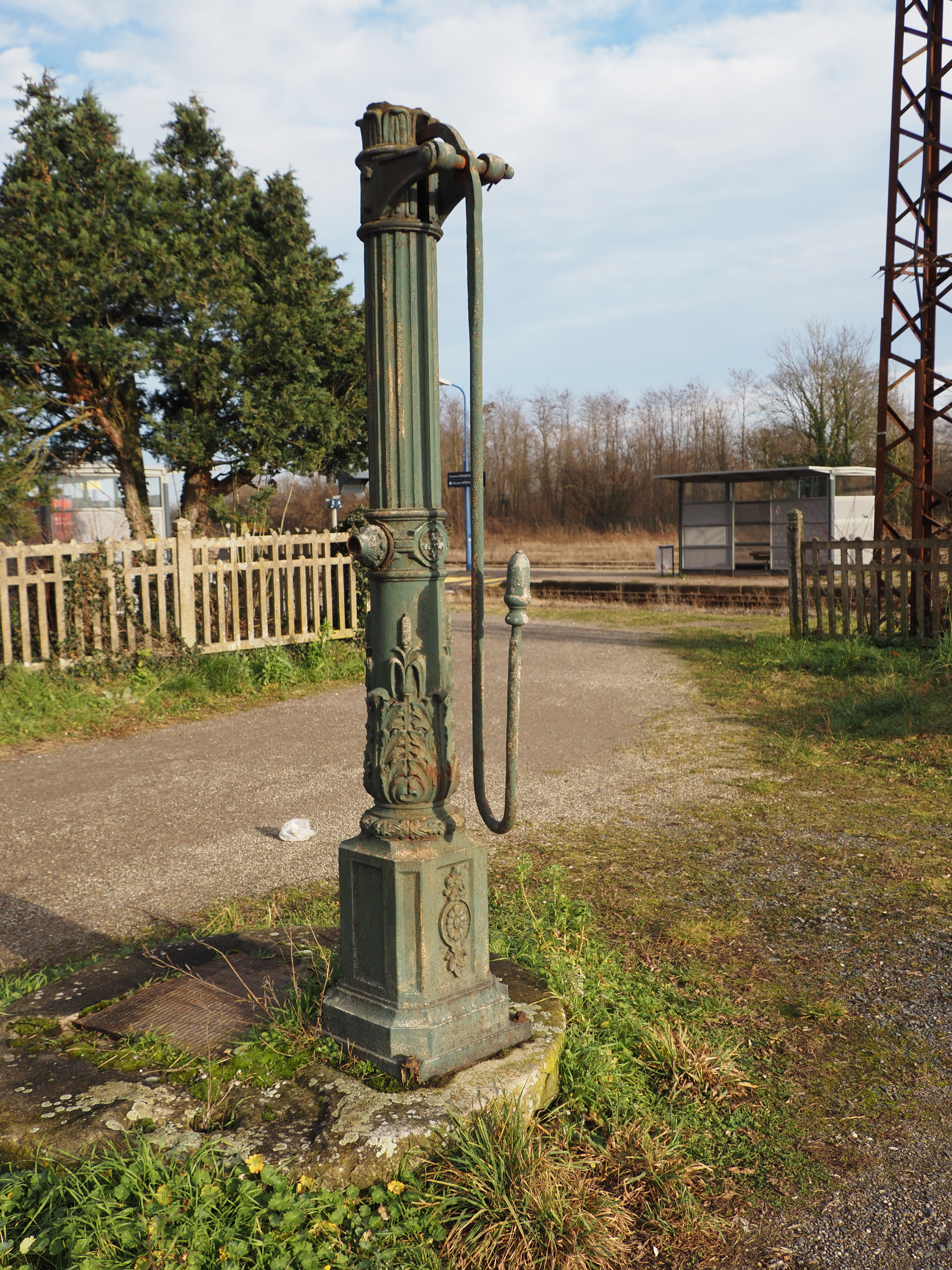
Waterpost, Gare de Lauterbourg
