= Eichhoffen station =

Railway station in Bas-Rhin, France

Coordinates: 48°22′57″N 7°26′58″E

Eichhoffen

General information
- Location: Rue de la Gare; 67140 Eichhoffen; Bas-Rhin, France
- Elevation: 203 m (666 ft)
- Owner: SNCF
- Operator: SNCF
- Line: Sélestat-Saverne railway
- Platforms: 1
- Tracks: 1

Other information
- Station code: 87214239

Passengers
- 2018: 10,526

Services
Preceding station	TER Grand Est	Following station
Barr towards Strasbourg	A07	Epfig towards Sélestat
Location

Eichhoffen station (French: Gare d'Eichhoffen) is a railway station serving the commune of Eichhoffen, Bas-Rhin, France. The station is owned and operated by SNCF, in the TER Grand Est regional rail network and is served by TER trains.

It is located at kilometric point (KP) 14,892 on the Sélestat-Saverne railway between the stations of Epfig and Barr.

== Services ==
The station is frequented by TER Grand Est train services between Strasbourg and Sélestat via Molsheim.
