= Epfig station =

French railway station

Epfig

General information
- Location: 67680 Epfig; Bas-Rhin, France
- Coordinates: 48°21′49″N 7°27′02″E
- Elevation: 221 m (725 ft)
- Owner: SNCF
- Operator: SNCF
- Line: Sélestat–Saverne railway
- Distance: 12.51 km
- Platforms: 1
- Tracks: 1

Other information
- Station code: 87214221

Passengers
- 2018: 22 409

Services
Preceding station	TER Grand Est	Following station
Eichhoffen towards Strasbourg	A07	Dambach-la-Ville towards Sélestat
Location

Epfig station (French: Gare d'Epfig) is a railway station serving the commune of Epfig, Bas-Rhin department, France. The station is owned and operated by SNCF, in the TER Grand Est regional rail network and is served by TER trains.

It is located at kilometric point (KP) 12.51 on the Sélestat-Saverne railway between the stations of Dambach-la-Ville and Eichhoffen.

== History ==
According to the SNCF, the station saw 22 409 passengers in 2018.

== Services ==
The station is frequented by TER Grand Est train services between Strasbourg and Sélestat.
