= Barr station =

French railway station

Barr
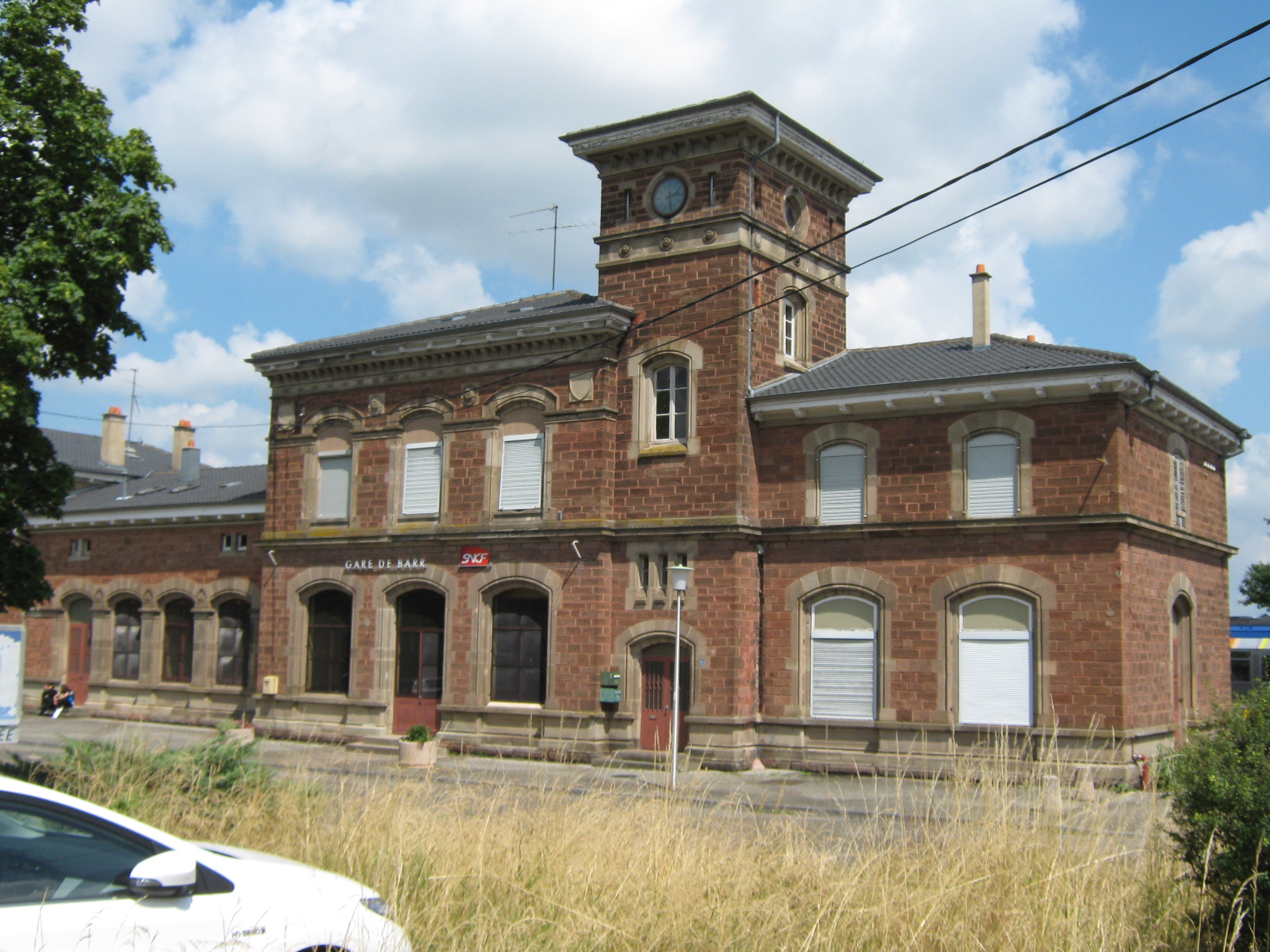

General information
- Location: Rue de la Gare; 67140 Barr; Bas-Rhin, France
- Coordinates: 48°24′12″N 7°27′24″E
- Owner: SNCF
- Operator: SNCF
- Platforms: 2
- Tracks: 2

Other information
- Station code: 87214247

History
- Opened: 28 September 1864

Passengers
- 2016: 291 049

Services
Preceding station	TER Grand Est	Following station
Gertwiller towards Strasbourg	A07	Eichhoffen towards Sélestat
Location

Barr station (French: Gare de Barr) is a railway station serving the commune of Barr, Bas-Rhin department, France. It is located on the Sélestat to Saverne railway. The station is owned and operated by SNCF, in the TER Grand Est regional rail network and is served by TER trains.

== History ==
The train station was opened by the Compagnie des chemins de fer de l'Est on 28 September 1864.

The old passenger building, which was built in 1877, is currently used by a billiards club.

== Services ==
Barr is a SNCF passenger stop on the TER Grand Est network. It is served by TER trains operating along the Strasbourg - Molsheim - Barr - Sélestat route (A07).

== See also ==
- List of SNCF stations in Grand Est
