= Dachstein station =

French railway station

Dachstein
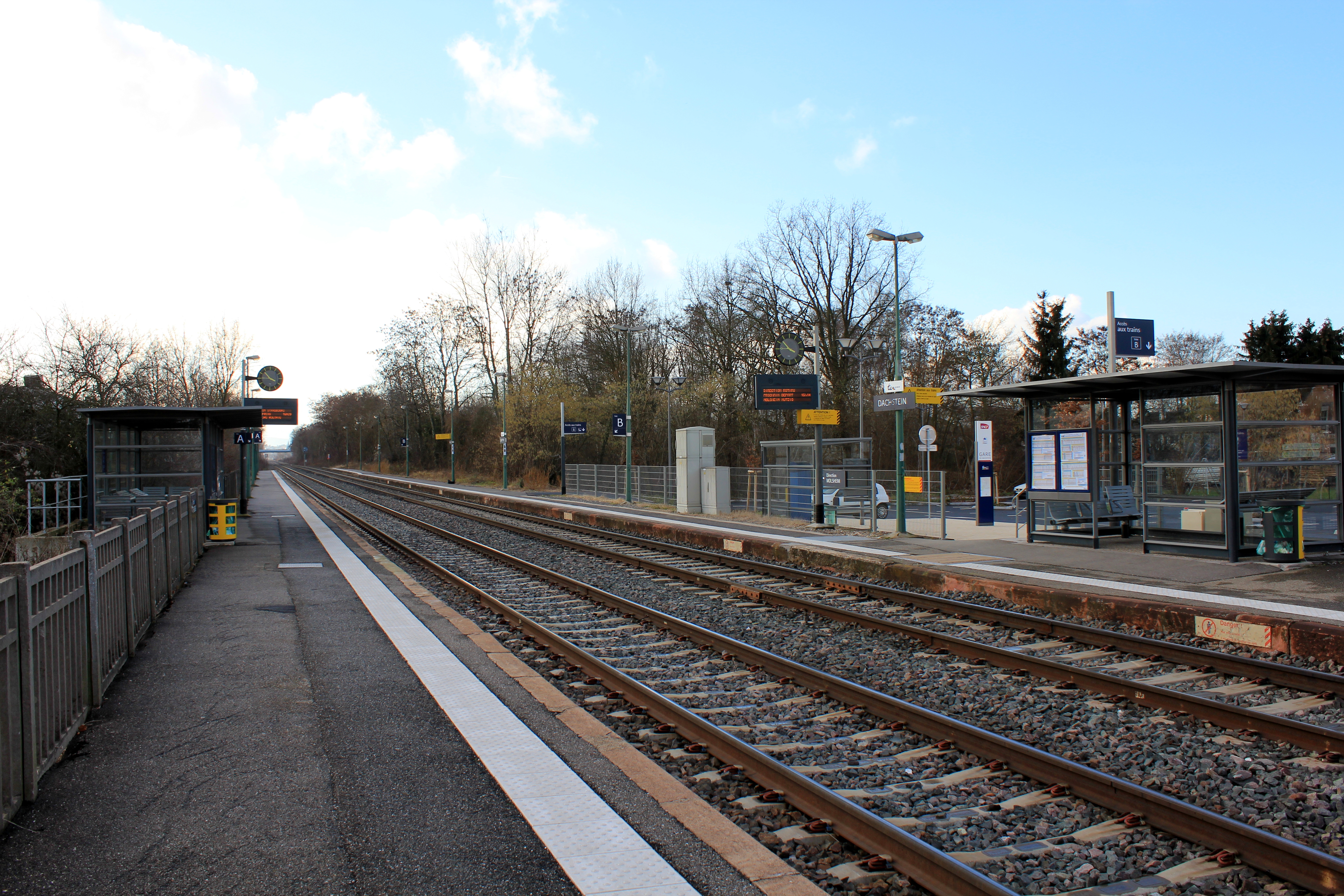
- Tracks and platforms at the station.

General information
- Location: Rue de la Gare; 67120 Dachstein; Bas-Rhin, France
- Coordinates: 48°32′34″N 7°32′00″E
- Owner: SNCF
- Operator: SNCF
- Line: Strasbourg–Saint-Dié railway
- Tracks: 2

Construction
- Parking: yes
- Cycle facilities: yes

Other information
- Station code: 87214551
- Website: Halte de Dachstein

History
- Opened: 28 September 1864

Services
Preceding station	TER Grand Est	Following station
Molsheim Terminus	A18	Duttlenheim towards Strasbourg
Location

Dachstein station (French: Gare de Dachstein) is a French railway station located on the Strasbourg–Saint-Dié railway. It is located in the communes of Dachstein and Molsheim, in departement Bas-Rhin, in northeastern France.

It was put in operation in 1864 by the Compagnie des chemins de fer de l'Est (Eastern railway company).

It is a travellers stopping station of the SNCF of the TER Grand Est network, and is only served by regional express trains.

== Geography ==
Established at an altitude of 169 meters, the Dachstein station is located at the kilometric point 16.335 of the Strasbourg–Saint-Dié railway, between the stations of Duttlenheim and of Molsheim.

== History ==
The "Dachstein–Altorf" station is put in operation on September 28, 1864 by the Compagnie des chemins de fer de l'Est, when the latter began the operation of the vicinal railway n°1 bis between Strasbourg and Barr.

As of 2014, it is a travellers station of local interest (category C: less than 100 000 travellers/year from 2010 to 2011).

== Travellers service ==
=== Reception ===
Being a SNCF stopping station, it is a staffless station with free access. It is equipped with automatic machines allowing the travellers to purchase tickets and includes two platforms and two shelters.

The crossing of the tracks is performed through the road level crossing.

=== Servicing ===
The Dachstein station belongs to the TER Grand Est network and is only served by regional express trains of the Gare de Strasbourg – Entzheim Aéroport – Molsheim liaison (line n° A18).

=== Other means of transport ===
A parking for bicycles and cars is fitted out at the station.

== See also ==
- List of SNCF stations in Grand Est
