= Graffenstaden station =

Railway station in France

Coordinates: 48°31′56″N 7°41′23″E

Graffenstaden
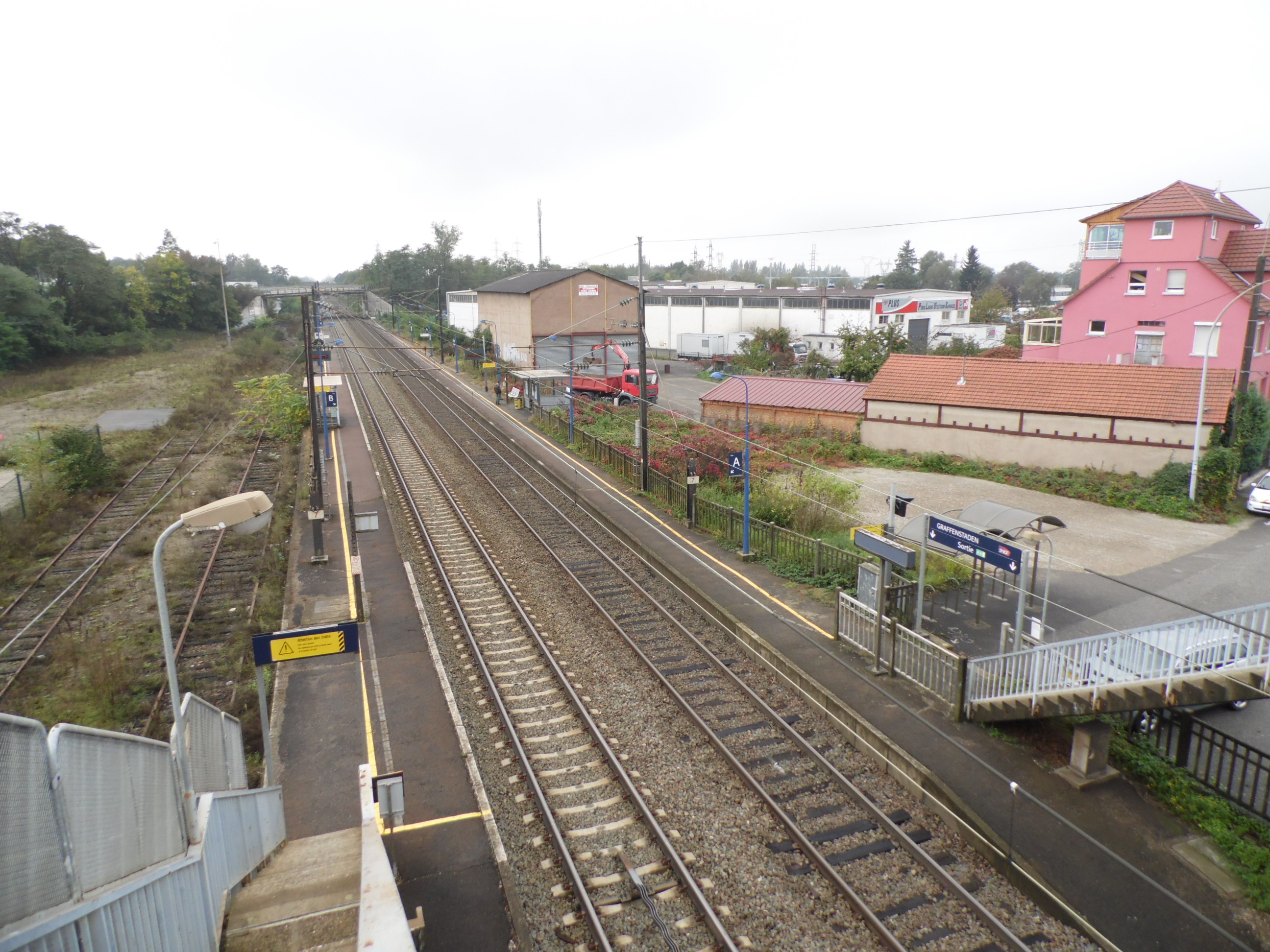

General information
- Location: Rue de l'industrie 67118 Geispolsheim; Bas-Rhin, France
- Elevation: 144 m (472 ft)
- Owner: SNCF
- Operator: SNCF
- Platforms: 2
- Tracks: 2

Other information
- Station code: 87212241

Passengers
- 2018: 27 446

Services
Preceding station	TER Grand Est	Following station
Strasbourg Terminus	A02a	Geispolsheim towards Colmar
Location

Graffenstaden station (French: Gare de Graffenstaden) is a railway station serving the industrial zone of Geispolsheim, close to the commune of Illkirch-Graffenstaden, Bas-Rhin department, France. The station is owned and operated by SNCF, in the TER Grand Est regional rail network and is served by TER trains.
