= Route Romane d'Alsace =

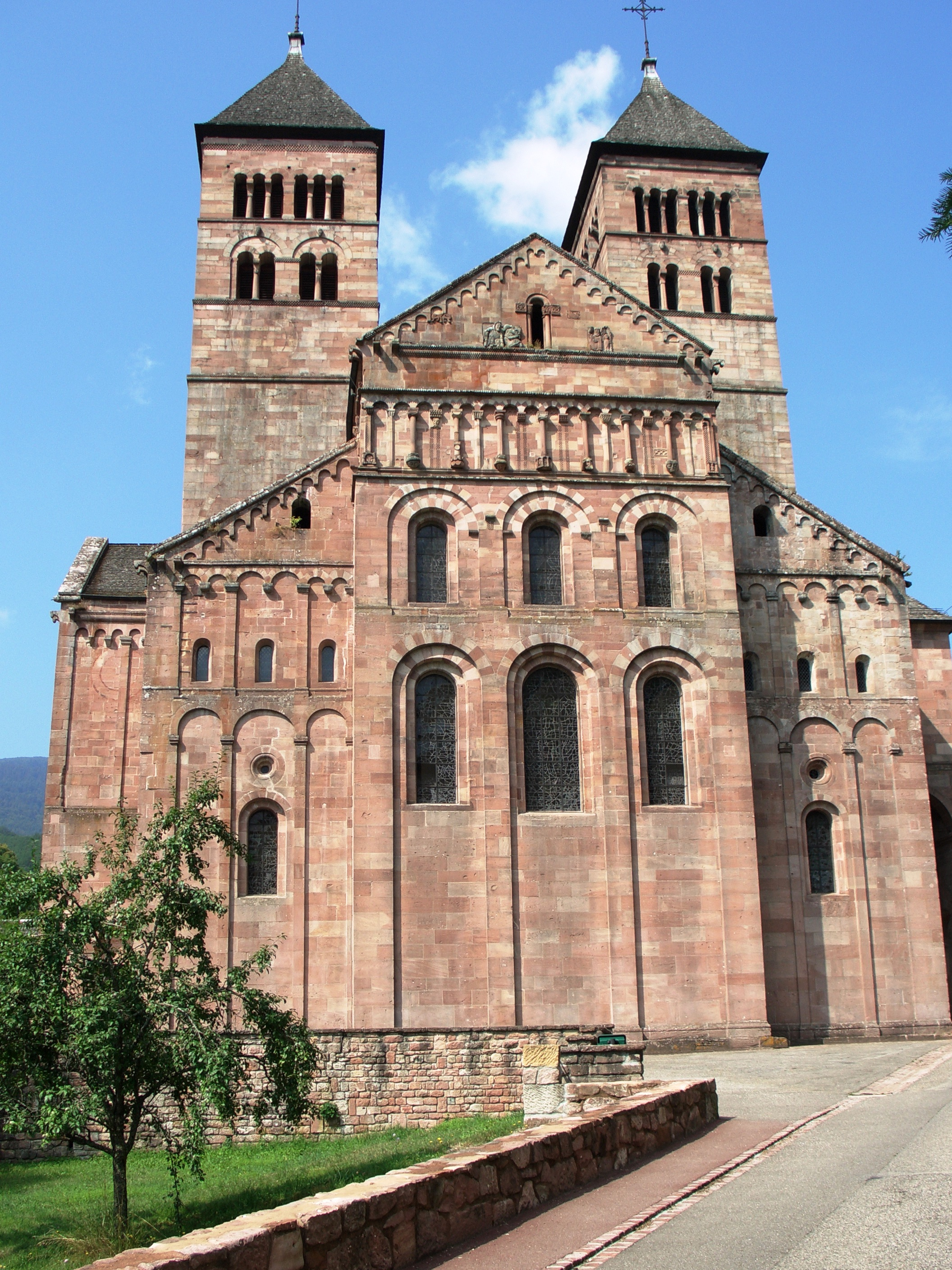
Murbach

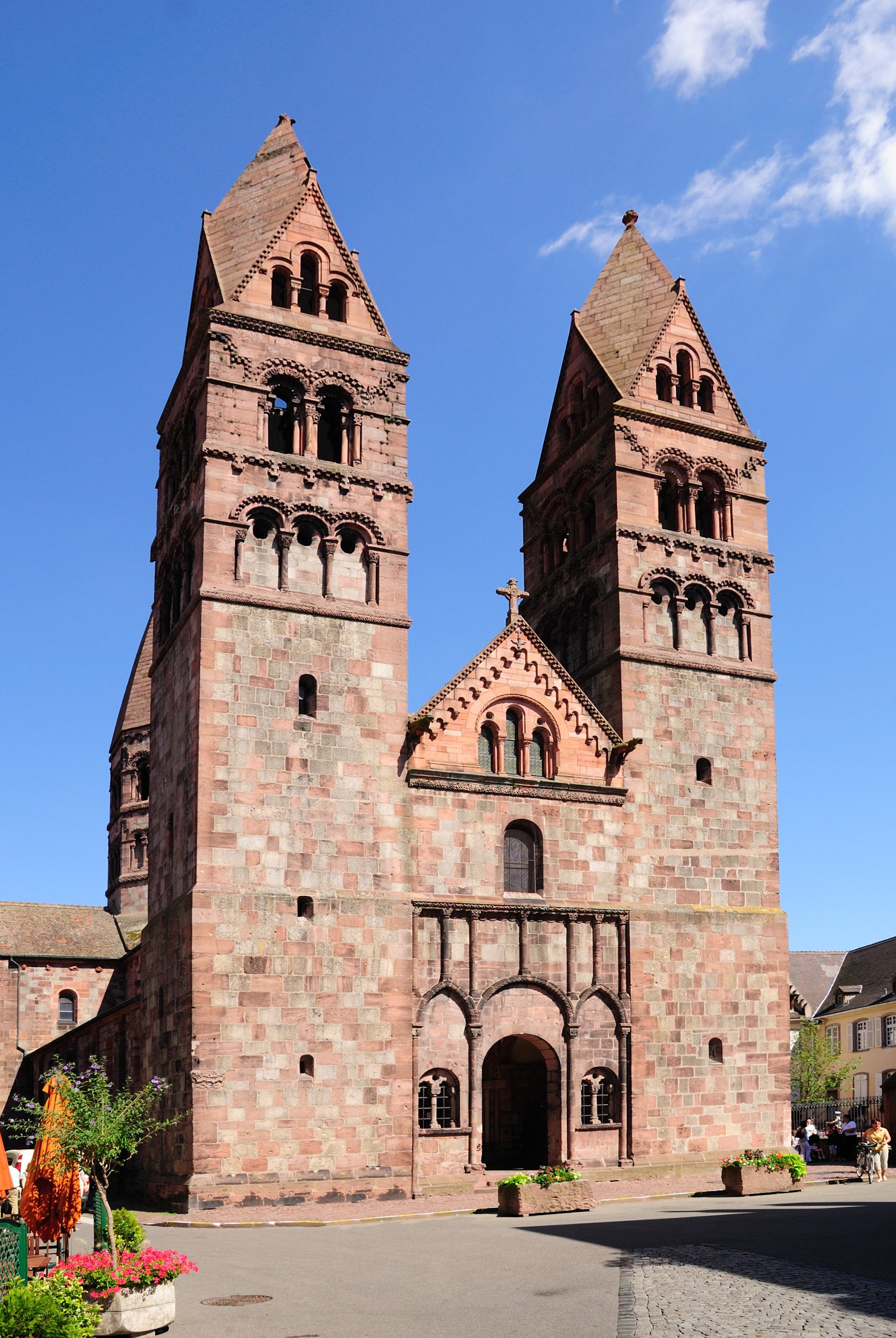
Sélestat

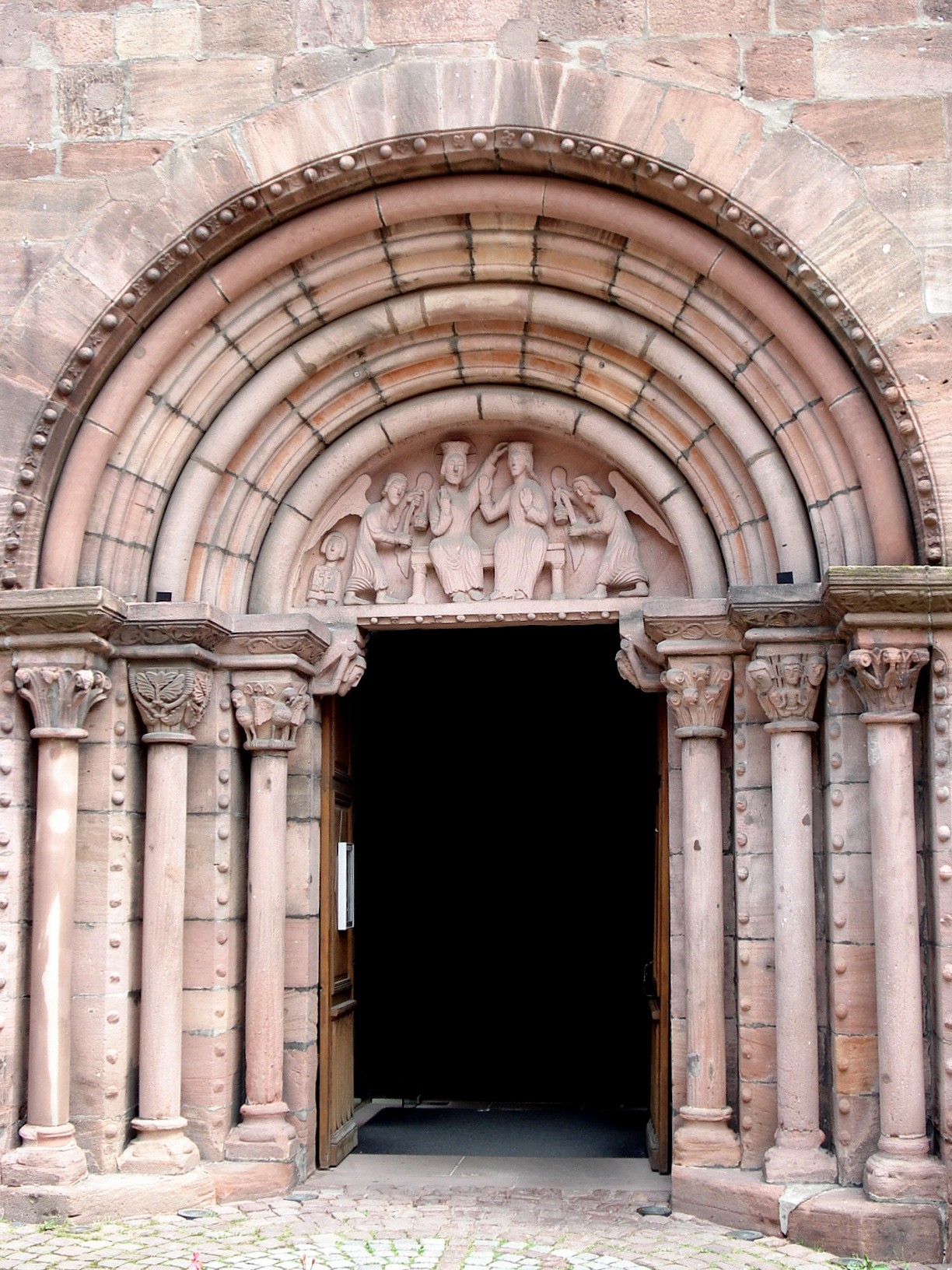
Kaysersberg

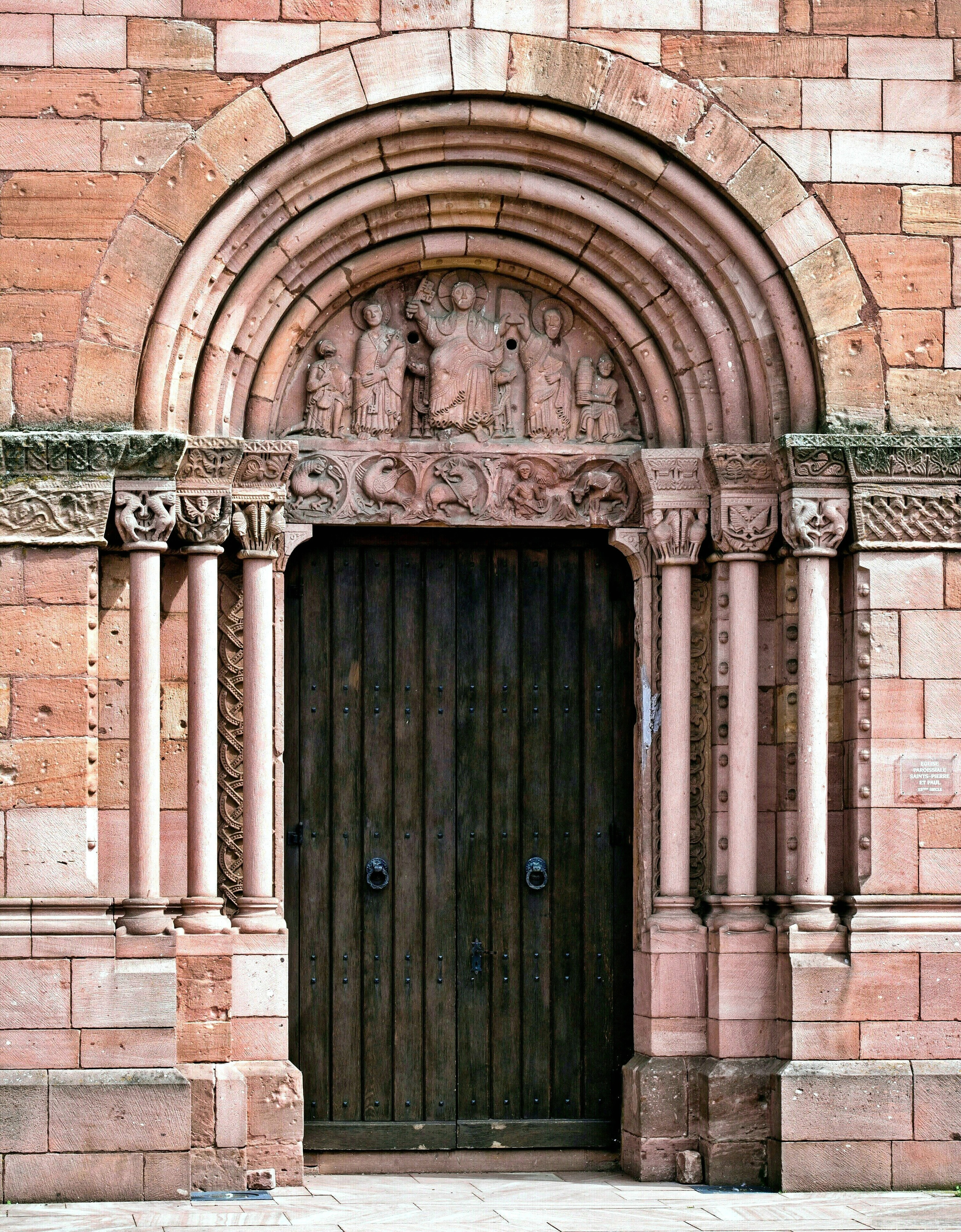
Sigolsheim

The Route Romane d'Alsace (Romanesque Road of Alsace) is a tourist itinerary designed by the Association Voix et Route Romane to link both the well-known and the more secret examples of Romanesque architecture of Alsace, in an itinerary of 19 stages, linking churches, abbeys and fortresses, that range from the first Romanesque structures of Alsace at the abbey church of Saint Trophime, Eschau, into the 13th century, and the beginning of Gothic architecture in Alsace. From north to south, the Route Romane d'Alsace traverses the Bas-Rhin and the Haut-Rhin, passing through:

- Wissembourg: Église Saints-Pierre-et-Paul, Gothic church with remains of a previous Romanesque building (Wissembourg Abbey)
- Altenstadt: Church of Saint Ulrich, 12th century.
- Surbourg: Church of Saint Arbogast, 11th century.
- Neuwiller-lès-Saverne: Église Saint-Pierre-et-Saint-Paul, 8th to 19th-century (visible Romanesque parts from 11th-13th centuries); Église Saint-Adelphe, 1190–1225
- Saint-Jean-Saverne: Church of Saint Jean Baptiste, 10th century.
- Marmoutier: Church of Saint Martin, the former abbey church of Marmoutier, 12th century.
- Obersteigen: Chapel of the Assumption of the Virgin, 13th century.
- Strasbourg: Vaulted crypt beneath Notre-Dame de Strasbourg; Church of Saint Etienne, 12th century; St. Thomas, cloister of Saint-Pierre-le-Jeune Protestant Church.
- Eschau: Abbey Church of Saint Trophime
- Rosheim: Church of Saint Pierre et Saint Paul, 12th century.
- Andlau: Church of Saint Pierre et Saint Paul, the former church of Andlau Abbey, 10th to 12th centuries.
- Epfig: Romanesque Chapel of Sainte Marguerite, 11th century.
- Sélestat: Church of Sainte Foy, 12th century.
- Sigolsheim: Church of Saint Pierre et Saint Paul, 12th century.
- Kaysersberg: Holy Cross Church.
- Gueberschwihr: Church of Saint Pantaléon, 12th century.
- Rouffach: Église Notre-Dame de l'Assomption, Rouffach
- Lautenbach: Collégiale de Lautenbach
- Murbach: Church of Saint Léger.
- Guebwiller: Church of Saint Léger, early 13th century.
- Ottmarsheim: Church of Saint Pierre et Saint Paul, 11th century.
- Feldbach: Church of Saint Jacques.

== See also ==
- Romanesque Road
- Romanesque architecture
- List of regional characteristics of Romanesque churches
