= Saint Margaret's Chapel, Epfig =

Chapel in Epfig, France

Saint Margaret's Chapel, Epfig is an 11th-century Romanesque church in the hamlet of Saint Margaret, near Epfig in the Lower Rhine Department of Alsace, France. It is part of the Route Romane d'Alsace.

The chapel, dedicated to Saint Margaret of Antioch, is of special historic and architectural interest. The church tower dates from the 11th century. The unique porch gallery was added in the 12th century. A square chapel was added in 1516. The interior contains some fine wall paintings. In the porch is a 19th-century ossuary, containing the bones and 277 skulls of local people who died in the 1525 peasant's war. The medieval-style gardens in front of the chapel, which include a cross-shaped herbal garden and fountain, were added in 2002. The Church was classed a historic monument in 1876, following substantial restoration work in 1875. The statue of Saint Margaret which used to stand in the chapel was stolen in 1973.

== Gallery ==
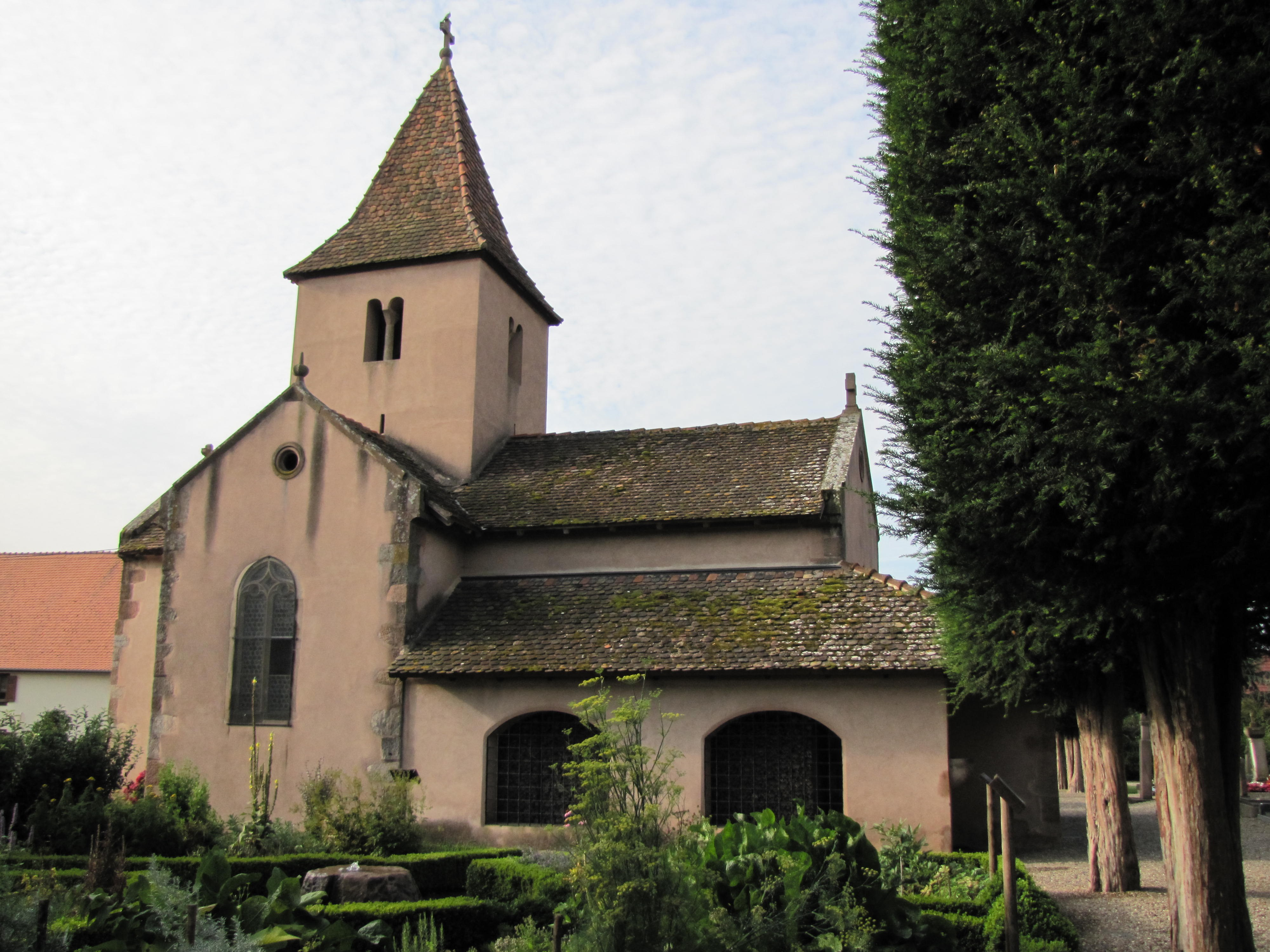
The Chapel

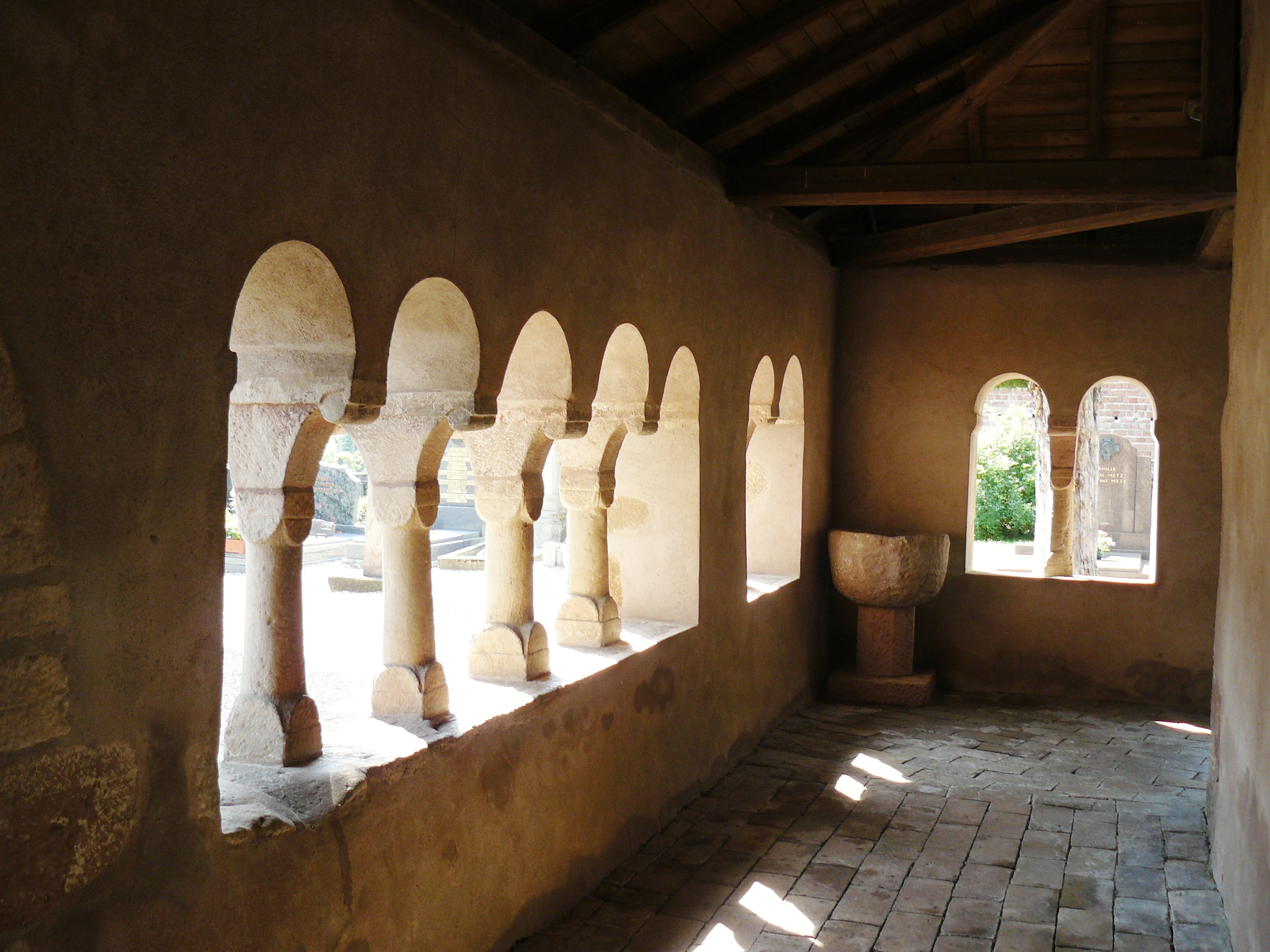
Part of the porch gallery

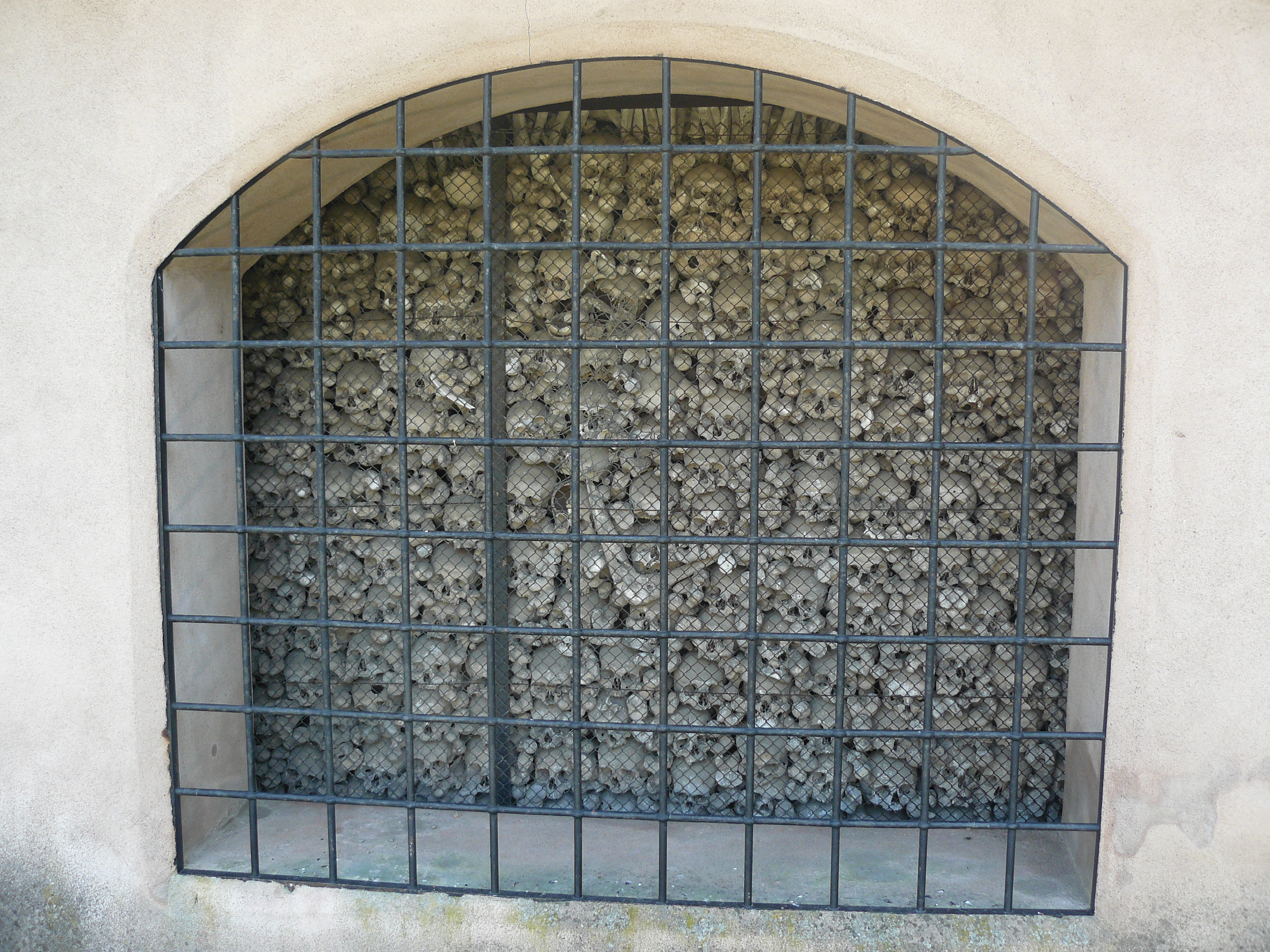
The ossuary
