= Saverne station =

French railway station

Saverne
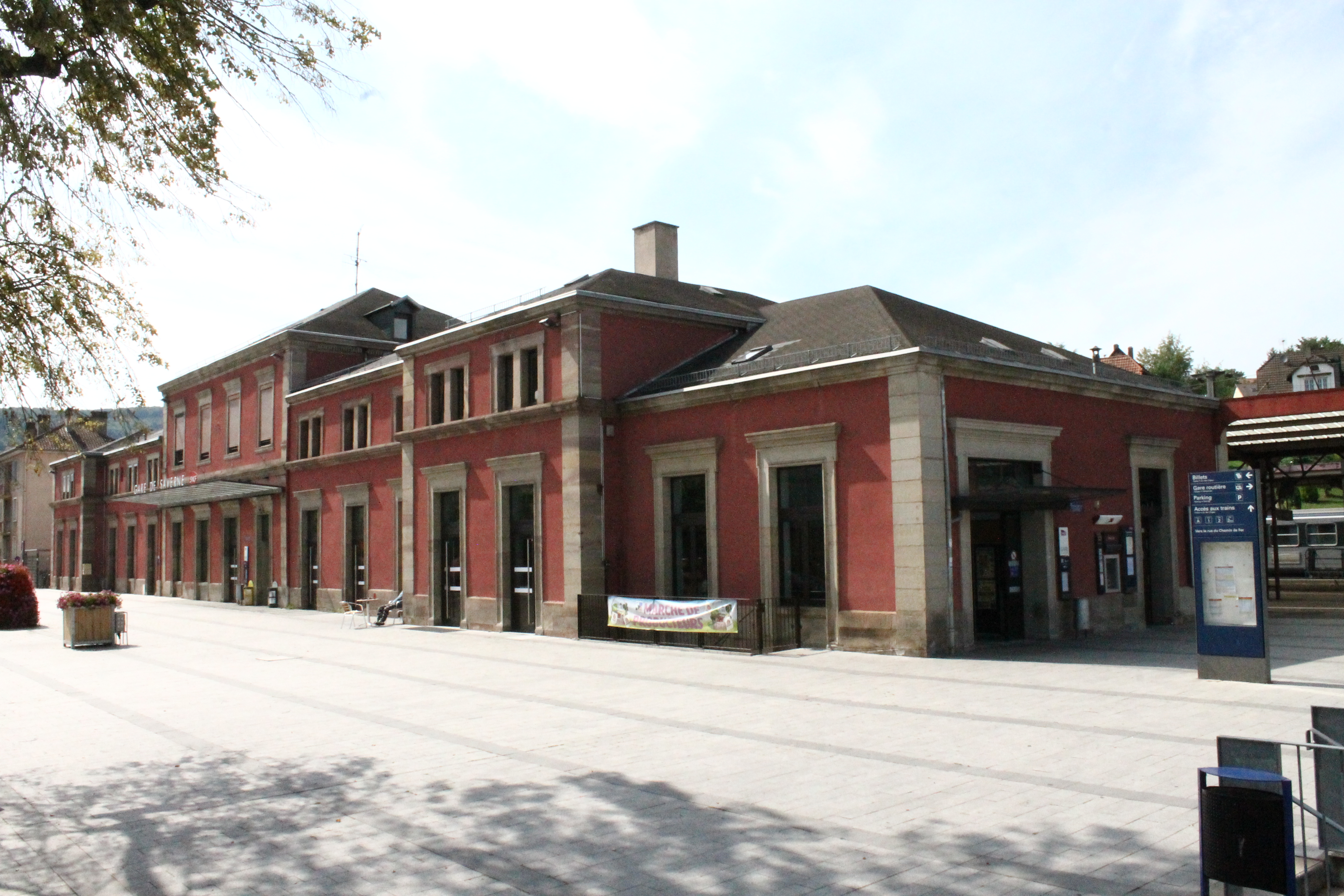
- Travellers building and entrance of the station

General information
- Location: Place de la gare, 67700 Saverne
- Coordinates: 48°44′41″N 7°21′43″E
- Owner: SNCF
- Lines: Paris-Strasbourg railway, Sélestat–Saverne railway
- Tracks: 4 + service tracks

Construction
- Parking: yes
- Cycle facilities: yes

Other information
- Station code: 87212225
- Website: Gare de Saverne

History
- Opened: 29 mai 1851

Passengers
- 2024: 1,499,240
Location

Saverne station (French: Gare de Saverne) is a French railway station located on the Noisy-le-Sec–Strasbourg railway. It is located within the commune of Saverne, in departement Bas-Rhin, in northeastern France.

The station was put in operation in 1851 by the Strasbourg–Basel railway company, which operates the section between the cities of Strasbourg and Sarrebourg on request by the Paris–Strasbourg railway company.

As of 2022, it is a travellers station of the SNCF, belonging to the regional railway network TER Grand Est. It is served by TGV (high speed) trains and by regional express transport trains.

== Geography ==
Established at 187 meters above the sea level, the Saverne station is located at the kilometric point 458.011 of the Noisy-le-Sec–Strasbourg railway, between the former stations of Stambach and Zornhoff-Monswiller. The nearest open travellers stations are located in Lutzelbourg and Steinbourg.

Being a former bifurcation station, it was the terminus of the Sélestat–Saverne railway, located at the kilometric point 64.840. This line was later downgraded and left between the stations of Molsheim and Saverne.

The Kuhn company's factory has its own siding at the Saverne station.

== History ==
The Saverne station was put in operation on May 29, 1851 by the Stasbourg–Basel railway company, when the latter officially opened, with staff and equipment, the operating of the railway section between Strasbourg and Sarrebourg located on the future Strasbourg–Paris railway. The inauguration of this section took place on May 18; however, the Paris–Strasbourg railway company, which suffered from a lack of well-trained railway workers, entrusted the operation to Stasbourg–Basel railway company, which had more experience.

The line between Saverne and Molsheim was opened in 1877. It was successively operated by the Compagnie des chemins de fer de l'Est (Eastern railway company), the Direction générale impériale des chemins de fer d'Alsace-Lorraine (General Imperial Direction of railways in Alsace-Lorraine), and then by the Administration des chemins de fer d'Alsace et de Lorraine (Management of railways in Alsace and Lorraine).

On January 1, 1938, the Saverne station became a property of the new French railway company (SNCF). Then, because of the annexation of Alsace and Lorraine in 1940, it was operated by the Deutsche Reichsbahn, as well as the whole railway network in Alsace and Lorraine.

In March 1969, the railway travellers service between Saverne and Molsheim was closed.

The Saverne station is served by TGV (high-speed train) since 2007, after the opening of the first phase of the European LGV Est line.

== Travellers service ==
=== Reception ===
Serverne station belongs to the SNCF, and includes a travellers building with a counter opened every day. It is stuffed with automatic machines allowing travellers to purchase tickets. Particular layout, equipment and services are available for disabled people. The station also includes a buffet.

=== Servicing ===
- TGV Est :
  - Paris – Saverne – Strasbourg line,
  - Paris – Nancy-Ville – Lunéville – Sarrebourg – Saverne – Strasbourg line
- TER Grand Est :
  - Metz – Sarrebourg – Saverne – Strasbourg line,
  - Nancy – Sarrebourg – Saverne – Strasbourg – (Basel) line,
  - Strasbourg – Saverne line.

=== Other means of transport ===
Bus stations : TER Alsace coaches and busses of Réseau 67.

A parking for bicycles and cars are fitted out at the station.

Preceding station	SNCF	Following station
Paris-Est Terminus	TGV inOui	Strasbourg Terminus
Sarrebourg towards Paris-Est	TGV inOui	Strasbourg Terminus
Preceding station	TER Grand Est	Following station
Steinbourg towards Strasbourg	A03	Lutzelbourg towards Sarrebourg
Lutzelbourg towards Nancy	A13	Brumath towards Strasbourg
Lutzelbourg towards Metz	A14	Brumath towards Strasbourg
Sarrebourg towards Paris-Est	C02	Strasbourg Terminus
