= Eichhoffen =

Eichhoffen Äschhoffe
- Commune
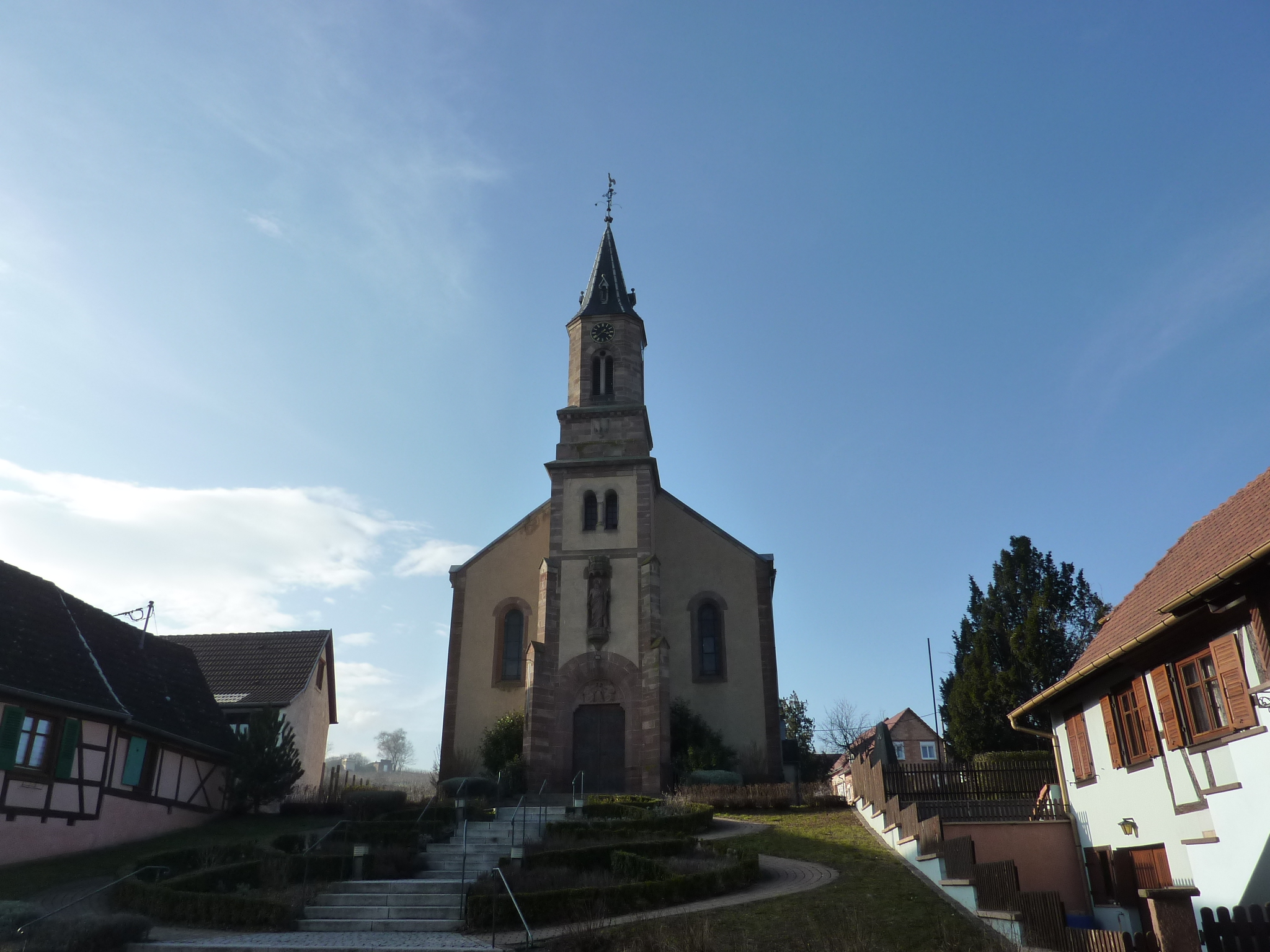
- The church in Eichhoffen

- Coat of arms
- Location of Eichhoffen
- Location within France Location within Grand Est
- Coordinates: 48°23′04″N 7°26′33″E
- Country: France
- Region: Grand Est
- Department: Bas-Rhin
- Arrondissement: Sélestat-Erstein
- Canton: Obernai
- Intercommunality: Pays de Barr

Government
  - Mayor (2020–2026): Evelyne Lavigne
- Area^{1}: 2.3 km^{2} (0.89 sq mi)
- Highest elevation: 278 m (912 ft)
- Lowest elevation: 192 m (630 ft)
- Population (2023): 489
  - Density: 210/km^{2} (550/sq mi)
- Time zone: UTC+01:00 (CET)
  - Summer (DST): UTC+02:00 (CEST)
- INSEE/Postal code: 67120 /67140
- ^{1} French Land Register data, which excludes lakes, ponds, glaciers > 1 km^{2} (0.386 sq mi or 247 acres) and river estuaries.

Eichhoffen (French pronunciation: [aiʃofən]; German: Eichhofen im Elsaß) is a commune, in the Bas-Rhin department in Alsace in north-eastern France. Eichhoffen station has rail connections to Strasbourg and Sélestat.

== Politics and government ==
Elected in 2014 and re-elected in 2020, the current mayor of Eichhoffen is Évelyne Lavigne.

== Notable residents ==
- Mathias Ringmann (1482–1511) — Scholar, cosmographer and poet

== See also ==
- Communes of the Bas-Rhin department
