= Molsheim station =

French railway station

Molsheim
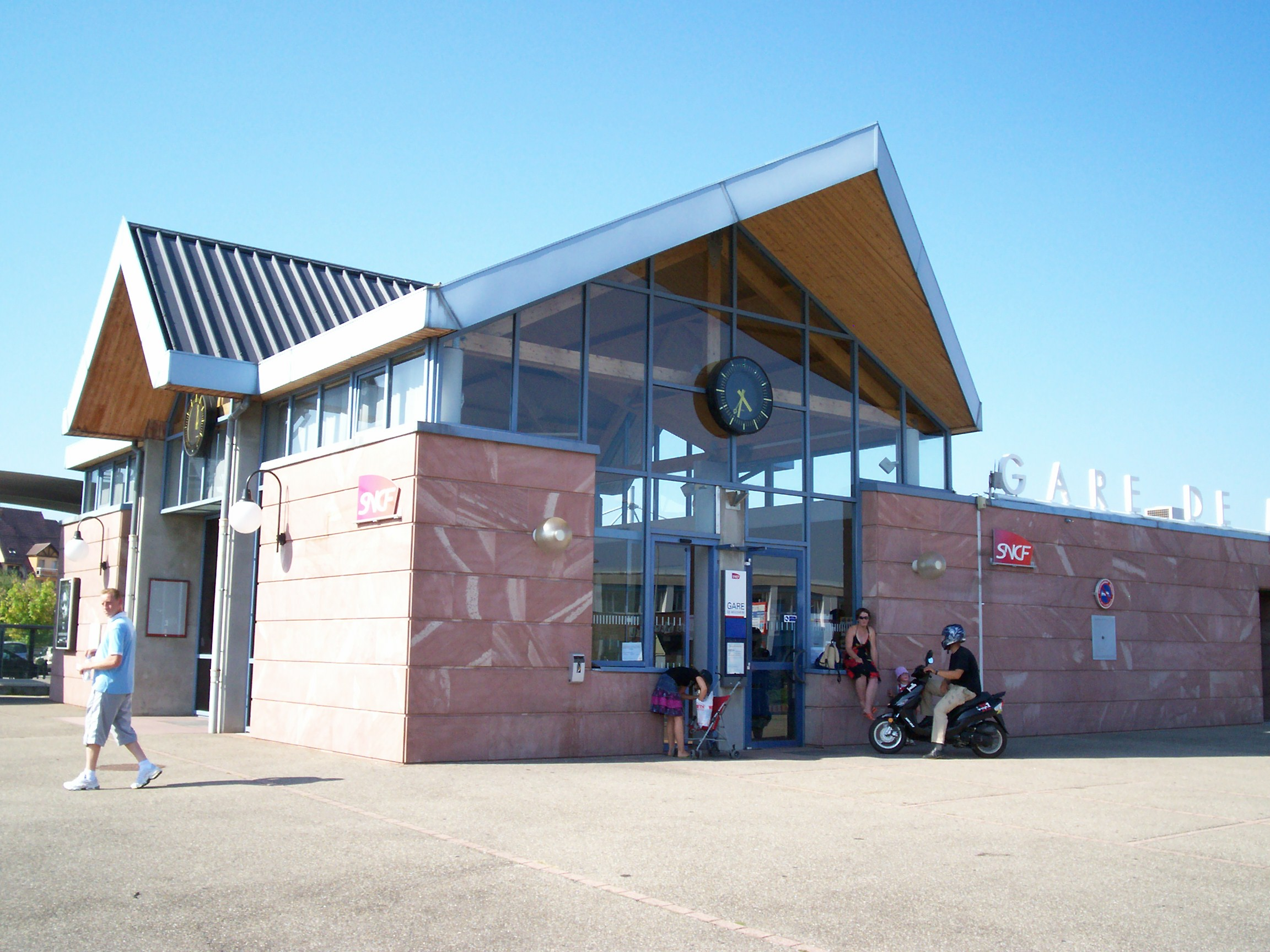
- The travellers building and the entrance of the station

General information
- Location: 25 avenue de la Gare, 67120 Molsheim
- Coordinates: 48°32′14″N 7°30′00″E
- Owner: SNCF
- Lines: Strasbourg–Saint-Dié railway, Sélestat–Saverne railway
- Tracks: 3 + service tracks

Construction
- Parking: yes
- Cycle facilities: yes

Other information
- Station code: 87214577
- Website: Gare de Molsheim

History
- Opened: 28 September 1864

Passengers
- 2024: 1,826,333

Services
Preceding station	TER Grand Est	Following station
Entzheim-Aéroport towards Strasbourg	A07	Dorlisheim towards Sélestat
Entzheim-Aéroport towards Strasbourg	A08	Mutzig towards Épinal
Terminus	A34	Dachstein towards Strasbourg
Location

Gare de Molsheim is a French railway station located on the Strasbourg—Saint-Dié and Sélestat–Saverne railways. It is located within the commune of Molsheim, in the Bas-Rhin department, in northeastern France.

It is put in operation by the Compagnie des chemins de fer de l'Est (Eastern Railways Company). It is a travellers station of the SNCF. Belonging to the TER Grand Est network, it is only served by regional express trains.

== Location ==
Established at an altitude of 177 meters, the former bifurcation station of Molsheim is located at the kilometric point 18.920 of the Strasbourg—Saint-Dié railway, between the stations of Dachstein and of Mutzig. It is also located at the kilometric point 33.461 of the Sélestat—Saverne railway, between the stations of Dorlisheim (still opened) and of Avolsheim (closed). The railway has been downgraded and left between the stations of Molsheim and Saverne.

== History ==
Molsheim station began operations on 28 September 1864 by the Compagnie des chemins de fer de l'Est (Eastern Railways Company), when the latter began the operation of the vicinal line n°1 bis from Strasbourg to Barr.

The former station was destroyed in 1993.

As of 2014, the Molsheim station is a travellers station of regional interest belonging the category B, its usage being greater or equal to 100 000 travellers per year from 2010 to 2011). It includes three platforms (one on each side of the tracks and one in the middle), two shelters and an underpass.

== Travellers service ==
=== Reception ===
Being a SNCF station, it comprises a travellers buildings, which includes counters opened every day. The station is stuffed with automatic machines allowing travellers to purchase tickets. Special layouts, equipments and services are available for disabled people. An underpass allows the crossing of the tracks and the passing from one platform to another.

=== Servicing ===
Being a travellers station of the TER Grand Est network, the Molsheim station is served by regional express trains of the following liaisons:

- Strasbourg – Molsheim – Barr – Sélestat (line A 07)
- Strasbourg – Saales – Saint-Dié-des-Vosges – Épinal (line A 08)
- Strasbourg – Entzheim-Aéroport – Molsheim (line A 18)

=== Other means of transport ===
A parking for bicycles and several parkings for cars are fitted out around the station.

=== Merchandise ===
The Molsheim station is opened to freight services.

== Pictures ==
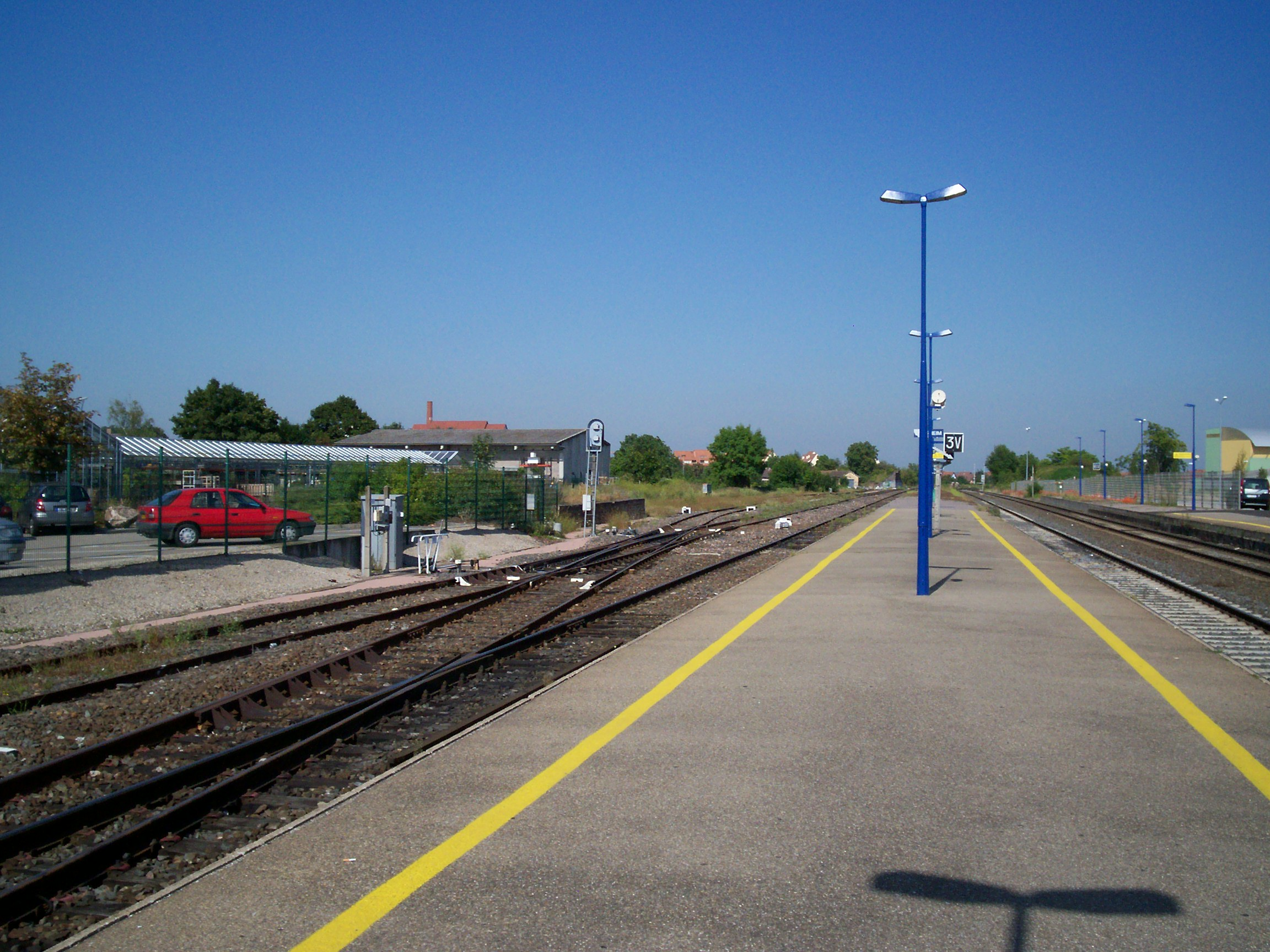
The tracks and the platforms at the station.

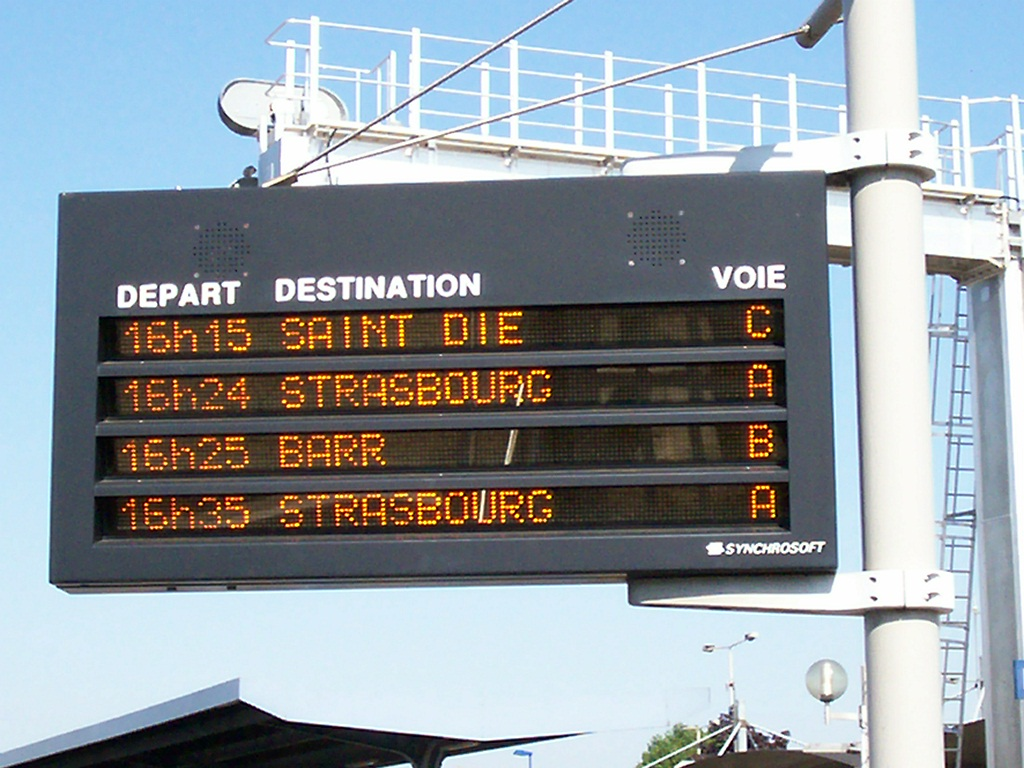
Information sign at the station.

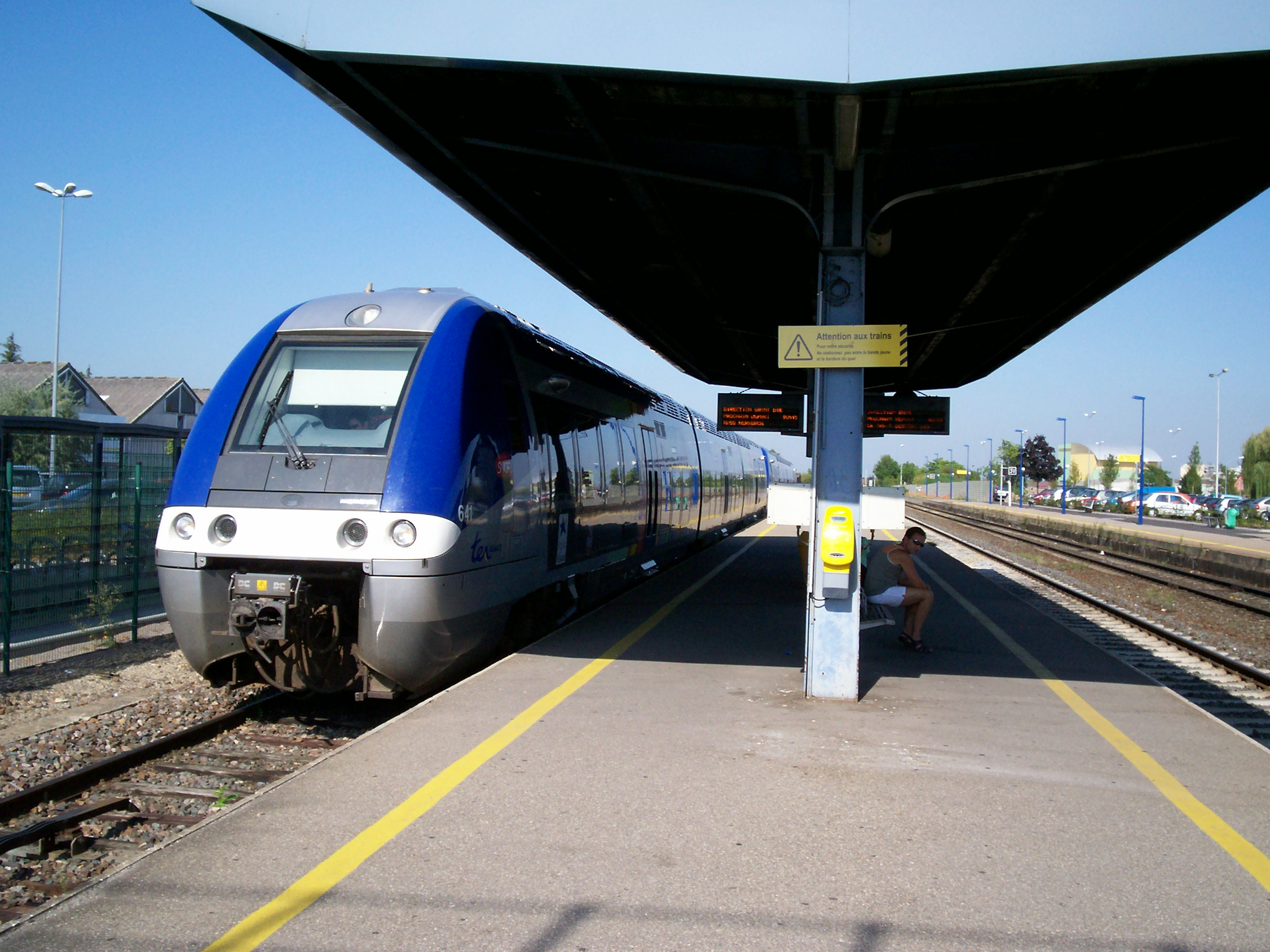
A TER at the station.

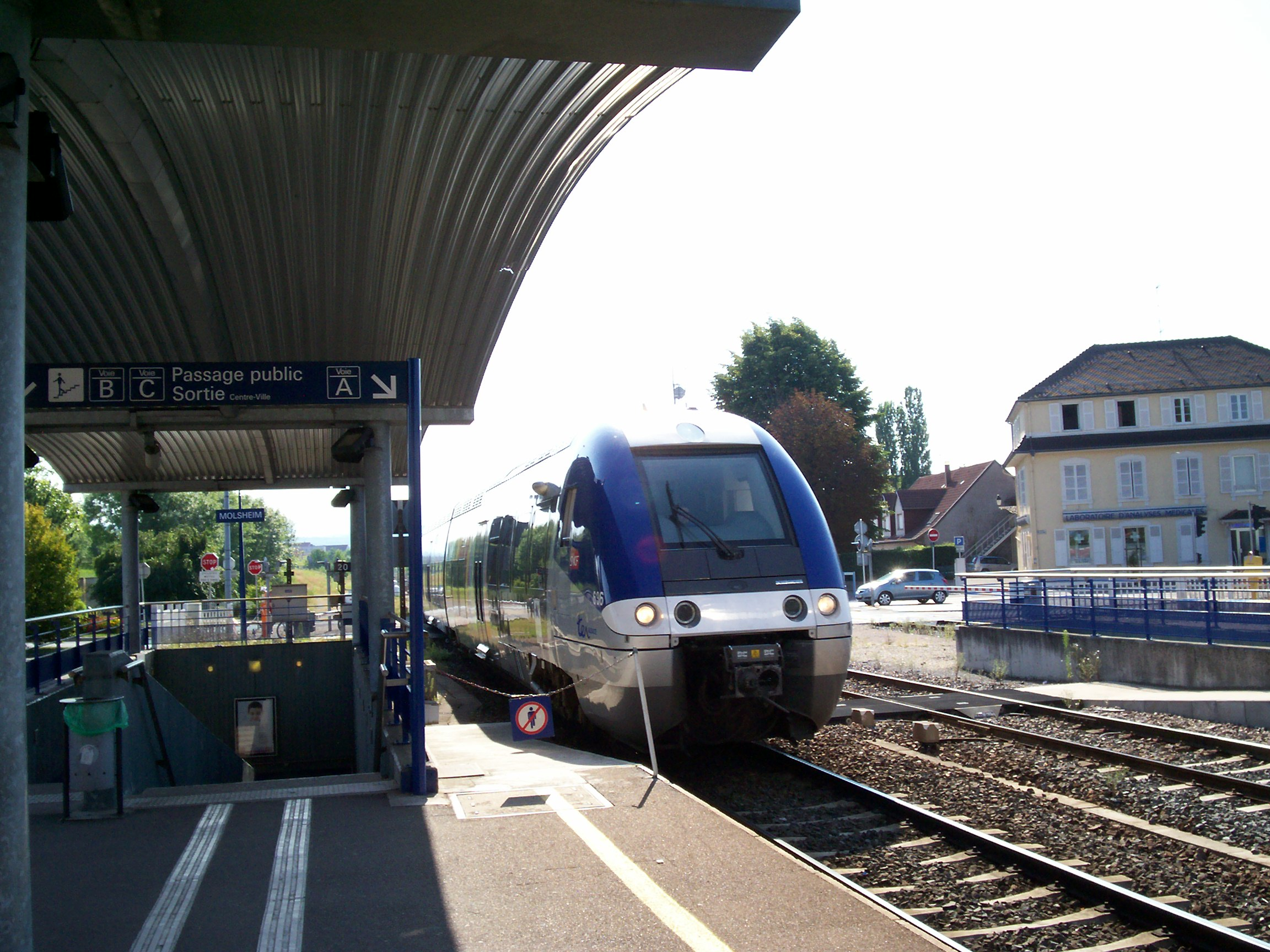
A platform and the underpass.
