= Colmar station (Haut-Rhin) =

Railway station in Alsace, France

Colmar
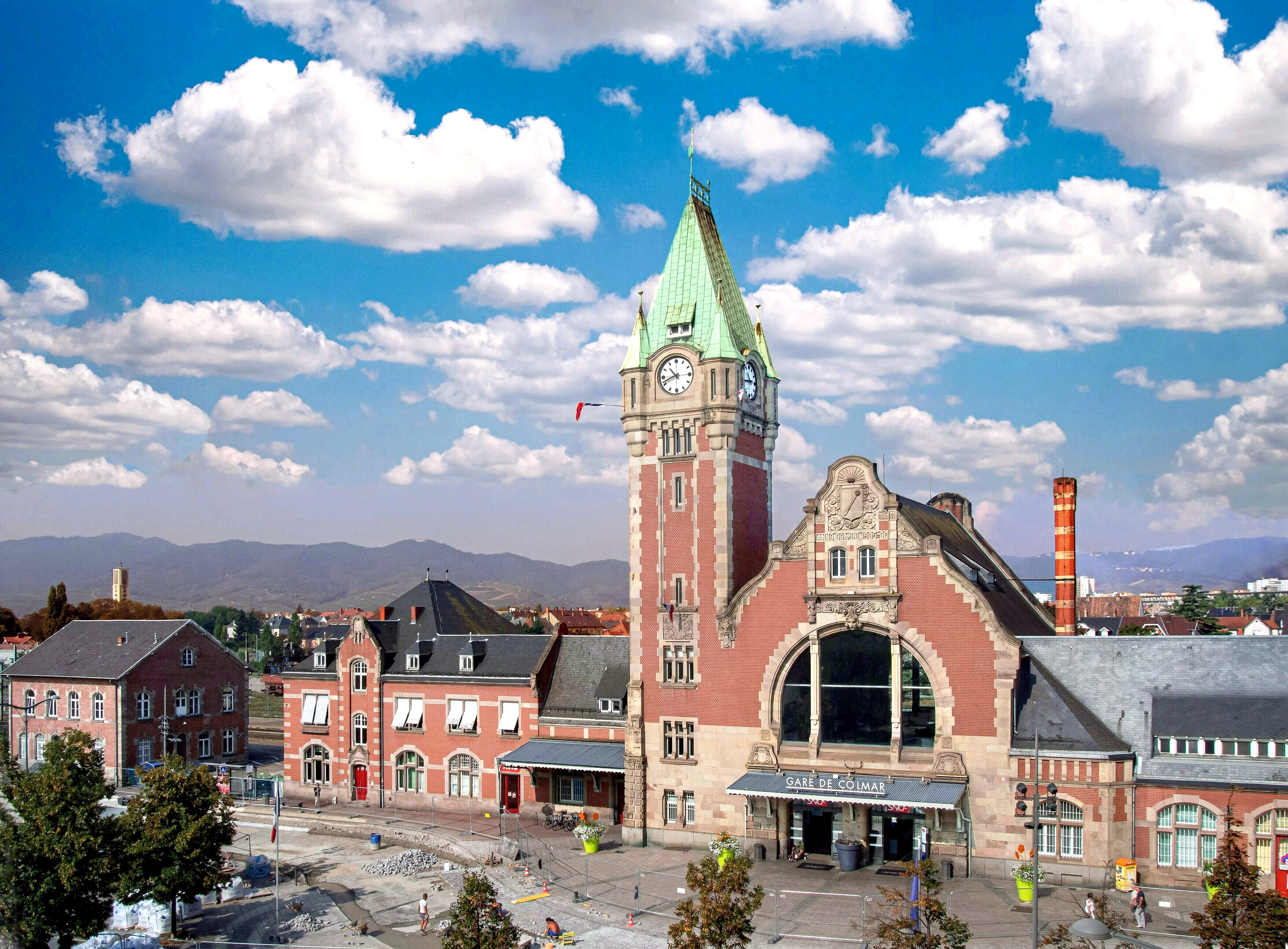

General information
- Location: 9, place de la gare, Colmar
- Coordinates: 48°04′21″N 7°20′49″E
- Owner: SNCF
- Lines: Strasbourg–Basel railway, Colmar-Metzeral railway, Colmar-Neuf-Brisach railway

Other information
- Station code: 87182014

Passengers
- 2024: 4,974,388

Services
Preceding station	SNCF	Following station
Strasbourg towards Paris-Est	TGV inOui	Terminus
Strasbourg towards Luxembourg	TGV inOui	Mulhouse-Ville towards Southeastern France
Preceding station	TER Grand Est	Following station
Sélestat towards Strasbourg	A01	Mulhouse towards Basel SNCF
Sélestat towards Strasbourg	A02a	Terminus
Terminus	A02b	Herrlisheim-près-Colmar towards Mulhouse
Terminus	A19	Colmar-Saint-Joseph towards Metzeral
Location
- Location within France Location within Europe

Colmar station (French: Gare de Colmar) is a railway station located in Colmar, in the Haut-Rhin département of Alsace, France. The same design was used in the construction of Gdansk's principal railway station in Poland. Thus the buildings are 'twins' of one another.

== Services ==
The following train services serve the station as of 2022:

- TGV
  - Line Paris-Est - Strasbourg - Colmar
  - Line Luxembourg - Strasbourg - Besançon - Lyon - Marseille/Montpellier
- TER Grand Est
  - Line Strasbourg - Mulhouse - Basel
  - Line Colmar - Turckheim - Munster - Metzeral

== Traffic ==
In 2023, over 4.7 million passengers travelled through Colmar station.

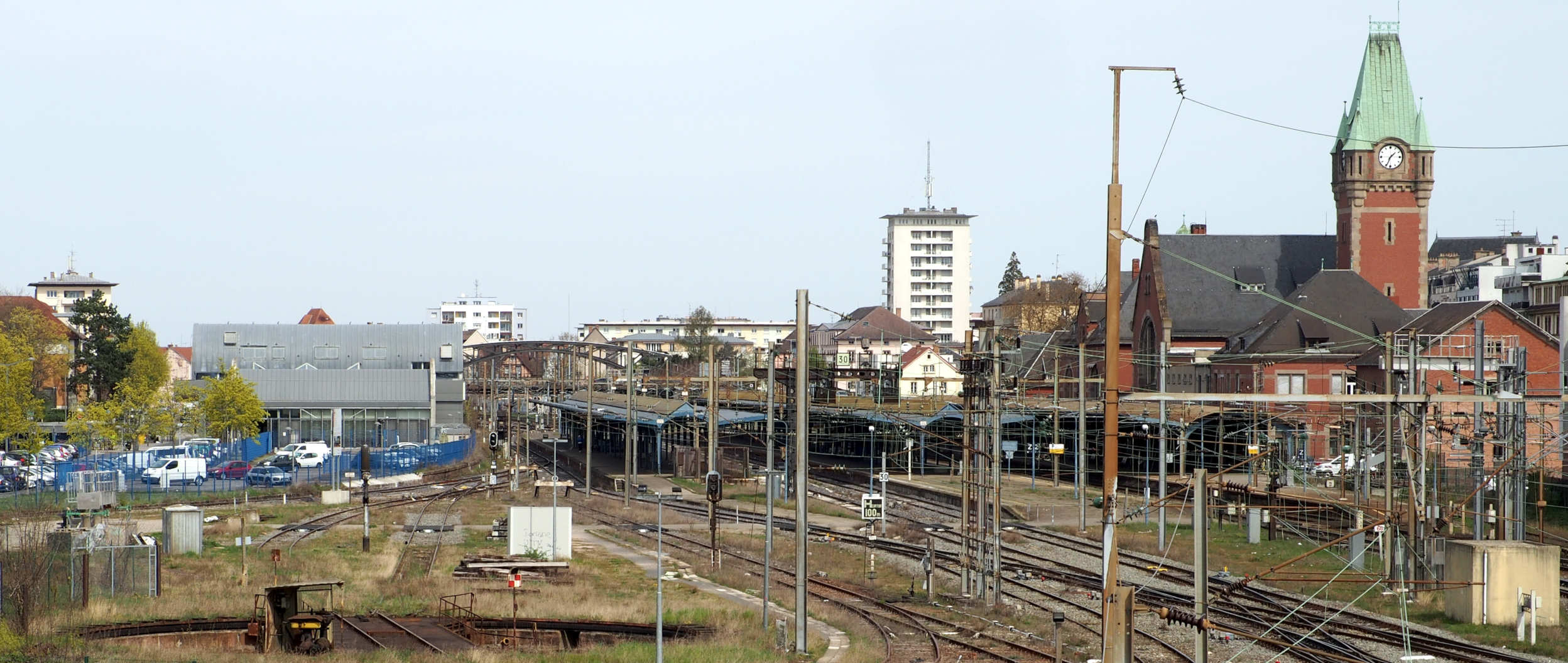
Platform side.

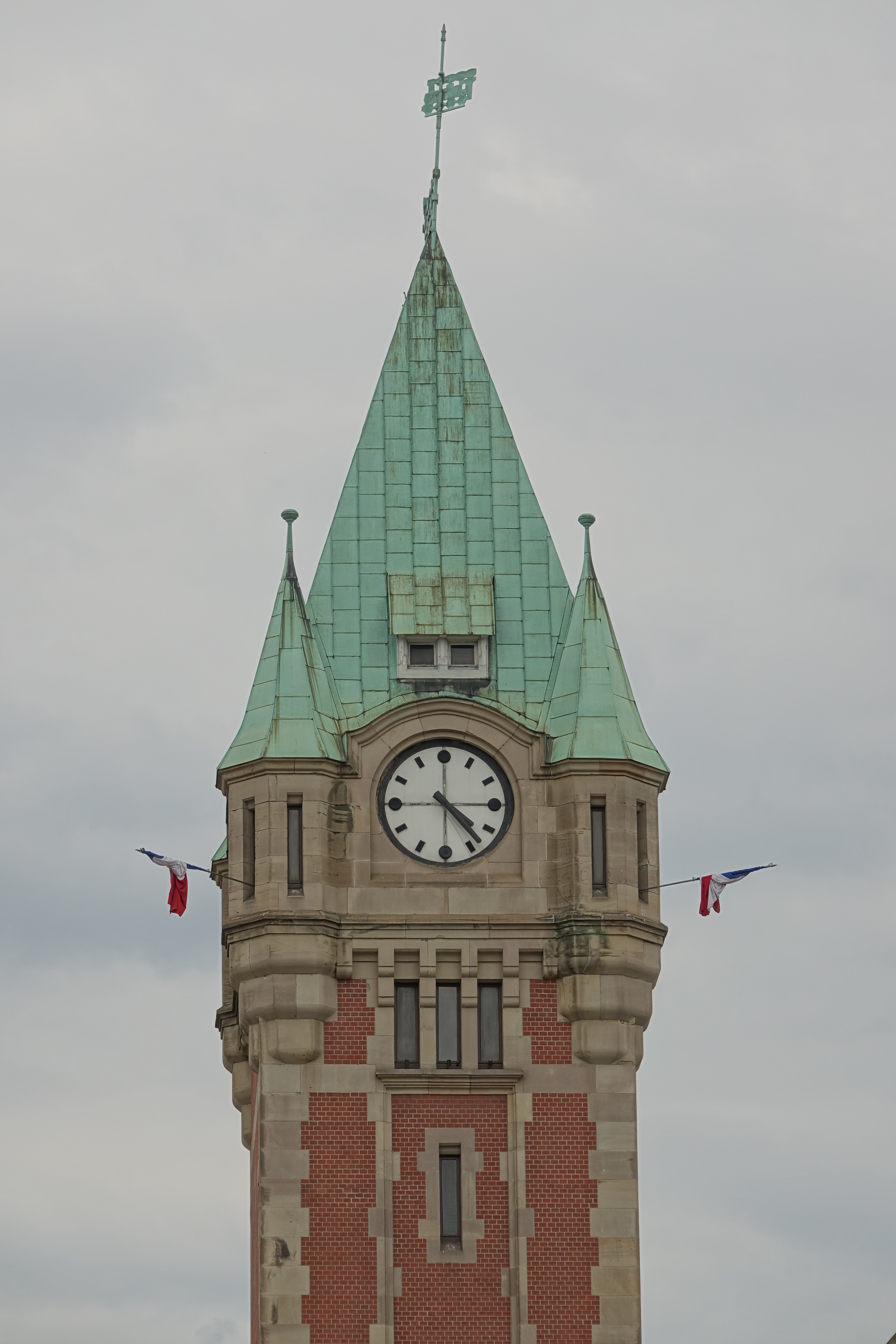
Clocktower.

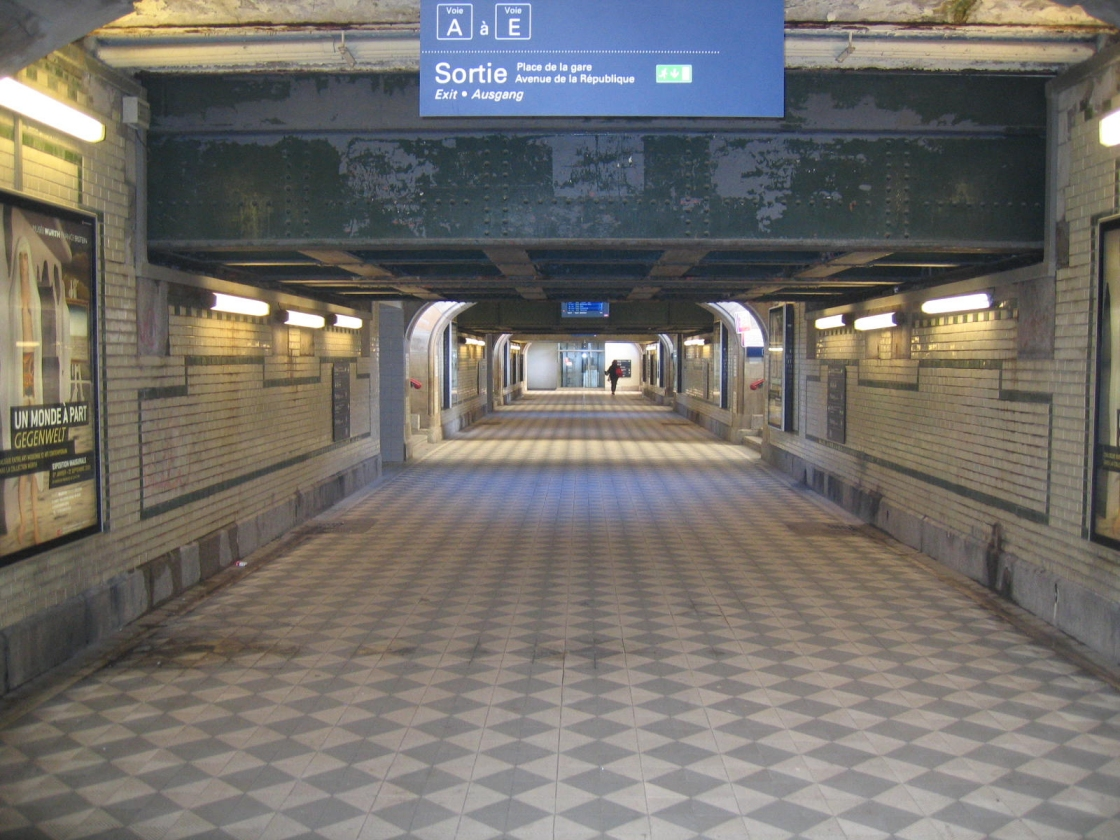
The subterranean passageway allowing access to the platforms.

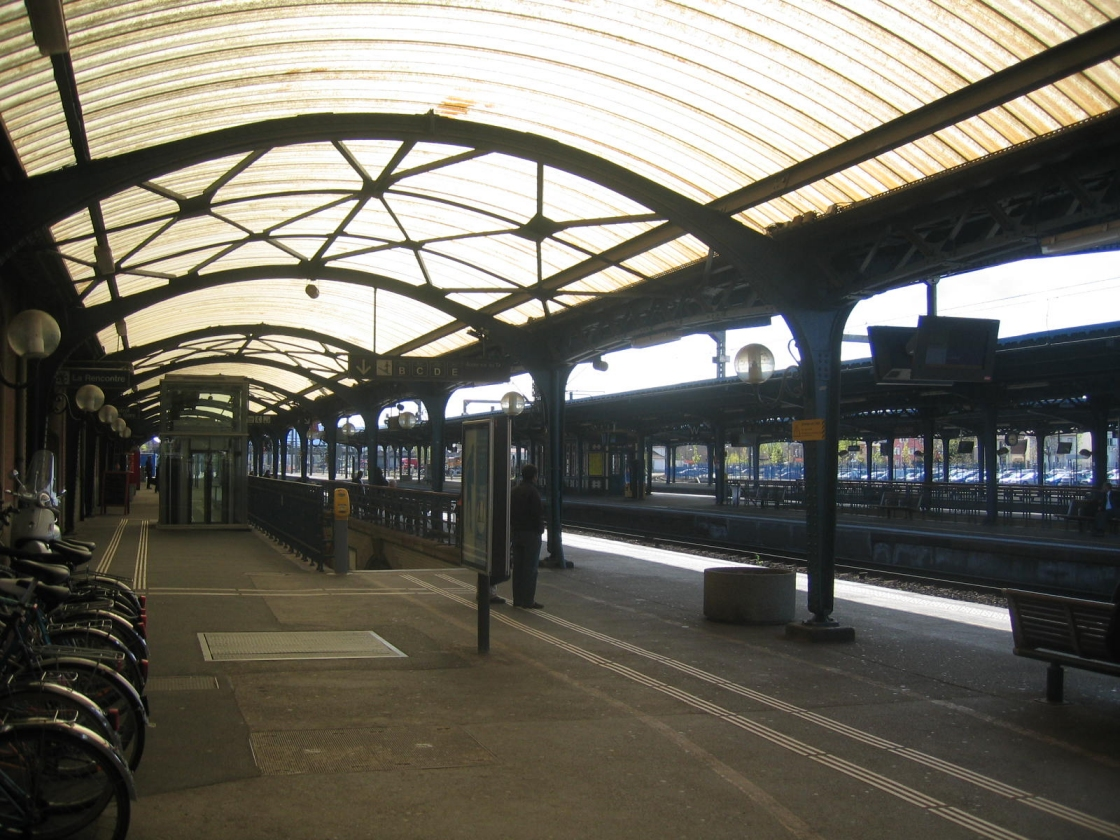
One of the platforms of the station.

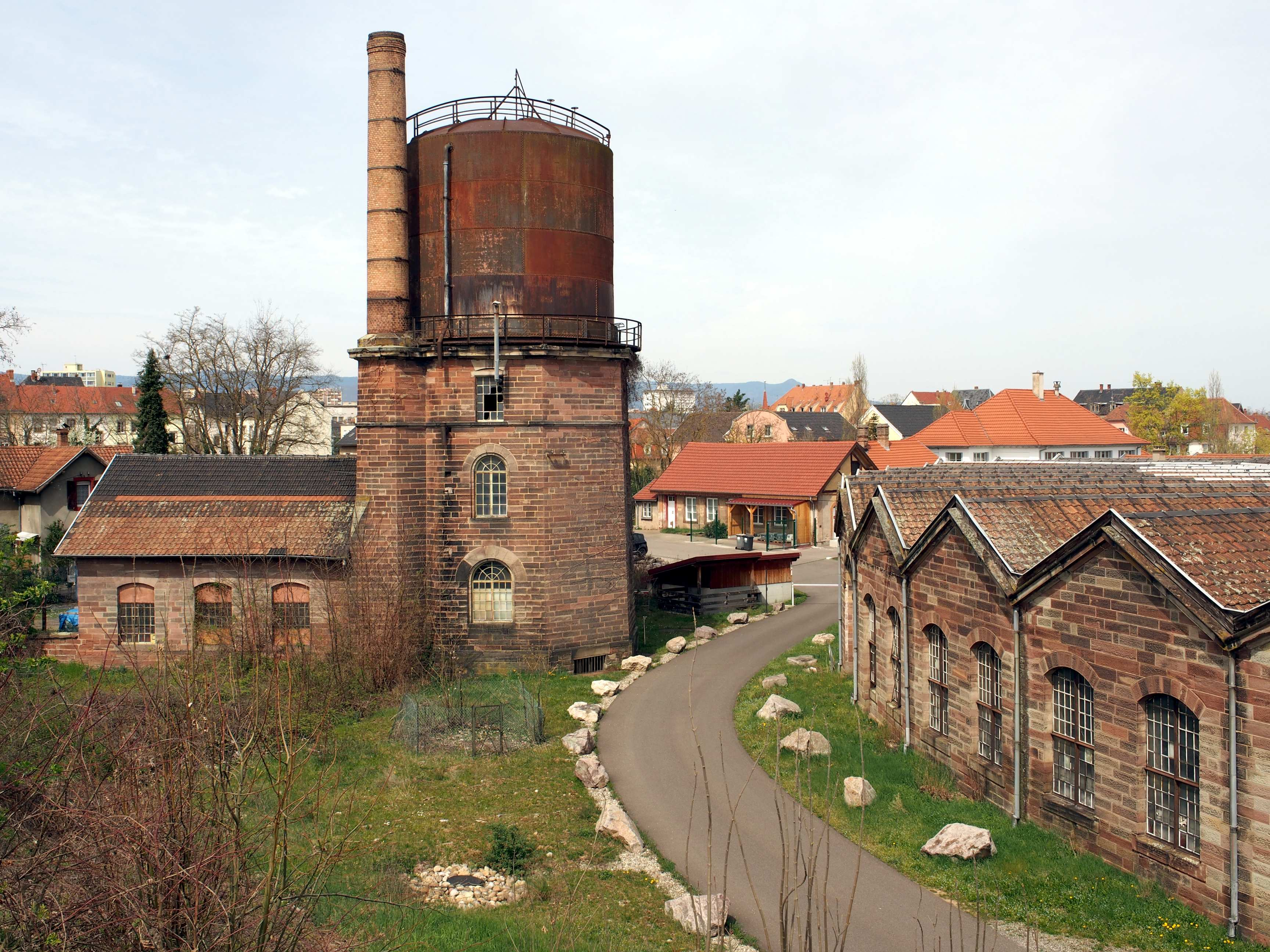
Former railway workshop

== Other stations ==
- Gare aux marchandises de Colmar: goods station
- Gare de Colmar-Mésanges: halt
- Gare de Colmar-Saint-Joseph: halt
- Gare de Colmar-Sud: closed
