= Strasbourg–Basel railway =

French and Swiss railway line

- Map of the line

Overview
- Status: Operational
- Owner: SNCF
- Locale: France (Alsace), Switzerland (Basel-Stadt)
- Termini: Strasbourg; Basel SNCF

Service
- System: SNCF
- Operator(s): SNCF

History
- Opened: 1840 - 1844

Technical
- Line length: 141.3 km (87.8 mi)
- Number of tracks: Double track
- Track gauge: 1,435 mm (4 ft 8 1/2 in) standard gauge
- Electrification: 25 kV 50 Hz
- Operating speed: 220 km/h (140 mph)

The railway from Strasbourg to Basel is a French and Swiss 141.3-kilometre long railway line. It is used for passenger (express, regional and suburban) and freight traffic. The railway was opened in 1840–1844. It was the first railway line to serve Switzerland.

== Main stations ==
- Gare de Strasbourg
- Gare de Colmar
- Gare de Mulhouse
- Basel SNCF and Basel SBB railway station

== Line history ==
The concession for the railway Strasbourg–Basel was granted to the Compagnie du chemin de fer de Strasbourg à Bâle, founded by the Koechlin brothers, in 1838. The first sections that were opened in 1840 led from Benfeld to Colmar, and from Mulhouse to Saint-Louis near the Swiss border. In 1841 Koenigshoffen (near Strasbourg) and Benfeld were connected, and Colmar was connected to Mulhouse. Finally in 1844 the sections between Strasbourg and Koenigshoffen, and between Saint-Louis and the France–Switzerland border were opened. With its southern terminus at Basel St. Johann, it was the first railway line to serve Switzerland, before the Spanisch-Brötli-Bahn. The assets of the Compagnie du chemin de fer de Strasbourg à Bâle were bought by the Chemins de fer de l'Est in 1854. On June 15, 1860, the line was extended south to Basel Centralbahnhof (now Basel SBB), its present terminus.

== Keeping right ==
The line was, from the start, planned and opened as a double track route, with trains travelling on the right. It had been intended to switch to running the trains on the left side of the double track once the line had been extended and connected with the main Paris-Strasburg line, but this was not done. After the transfer of Alsace into Germany in 1870, the region's railways were integrated into the German rail network, where travelling on the right-hand track of any double track was already standard procedure, so there was no longer any pressure for railways to switch to the French convention of running trains on the lefthand track. In 1919 and again in 1945 the region reverted to French control, but on the Strasburg-Basel line, as in the rest of Alsace where twin tracks are involved, trains continue to travel on the right.
