= Epfig =

Epfig Apfig
- Commune
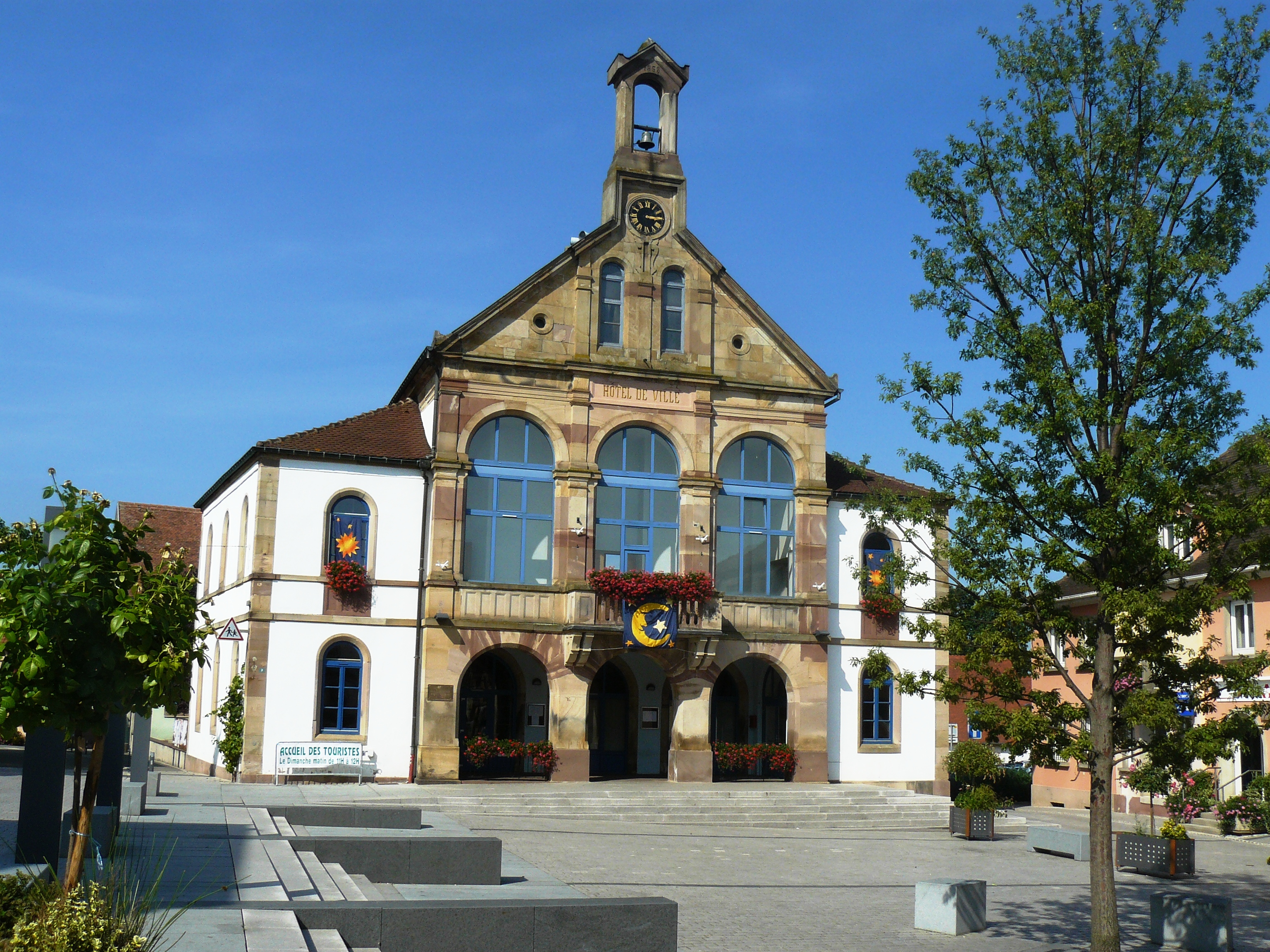
- The town hall in Epfig

- Coat of arms
- Location of Epfig
- Location within France Location within Grand Est
- Coordinates: 48°21′35″N 7°27′50″E
- Country: France
- Region: Grand Est
- Department: Bas-Rhin
- Arrondissement: Sélestat-Erstein
- Canton: Obernai

Government
  - Mayor (2020–2026): Jean-Claude Mandry
- Area^{1}: 21.9 km^{2} (8.5 sq mi)
- Highest elevation: 311 m (1,020 ft)
- Lowest elevation: 160 m (520 ft)
- Population (2023): 2,263
  - Density: 103/km^{2} (268/sq mi)
- Time zone: UTC+01:00 (CET)
  - Summer (DST): UTC+02:00 (CEST)
- INSEE/Postal code: 67125 /67680
- ^{1} French Land Register data, which excludes lakes, ponds, glaciers > 1 km^{2} (0.386 sq mi or 247 acres) and river estuaries.

Epfig (French pronunciation: [ɛpfiɡ]) is a commune in the Bas-Rhin department in Alsace in north-eastern France.

On the outskirts of the village is the 11th century Chapel of Saint Margaret. Epfig station has rail connections to Strasbourg and Sélestat.

== Population ==
Historical population
| Year | Pop. | ±% p.a. |
|---|---|---|
| 1968 | 1,666 | — |
| 1975 | 1,691 | +0.21% |
| 1982 | 1,704 | +0.11% |
| 1990 | 1,753 | +0.36% |
| 1999 | 1,947 | +1.17% |
| 2007 | 2,130 | +1.13% |
| 2012 | 2,217 | +0.80% |
| 2017 | 2,267 | +0.45% |
| 2023 | 2,263 | −0.03% |
Source: INSEE

== See also ==
- Communes of the Bas-Rhin department
