= Sélestat station =

French railway station

Coordinates: 48°15′36″N 7°26′35″E

Sélestat
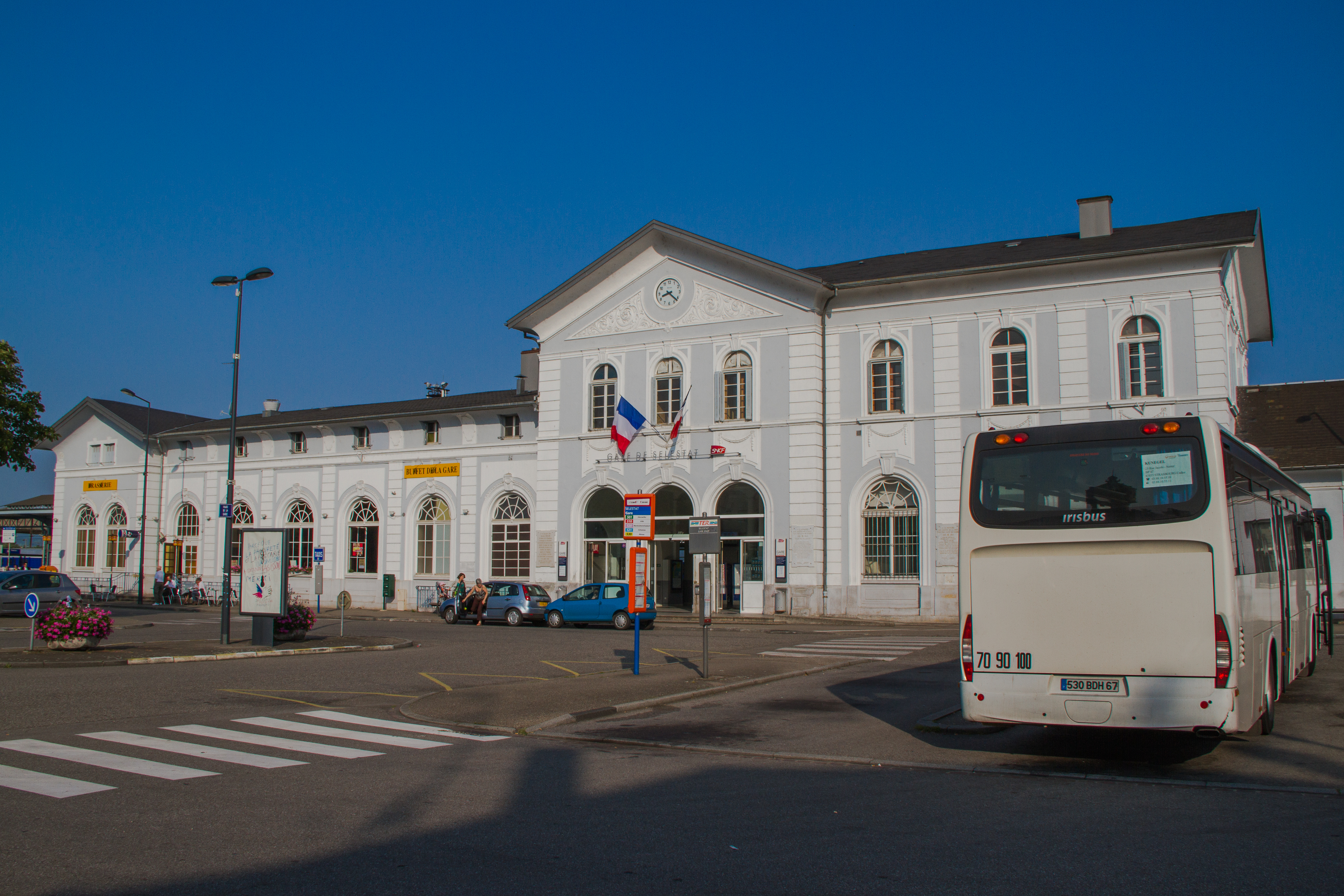

General information
- Location: 1 place de la Gare; 67600 Sélestat; Bas-Rhin, France
- Elevation: 176 m (577 ft)
- Owner: SNCF
- Operator: SNCF
- Lines: Strasbourg–Basel railway Sélestat–Lesseux railway (partially abandoned); Sélestat–Saverne railway (partially abandoned); Sélestat–Sundhouse railway (abandoned)
- Platforms: 5
- Tracks: 8

Other information
- Station code: 87214056

History
- Opened: 19 October 1840

Passengers
- 2024: 2,807,837

Services
Preceding station	SNCF	Following station
Strasbourg towards Paris-Est	TGV inOui	Colmar (Haut-Rhin) Terminus
Preceding station	TER Grand Est	Following station
Strasbourg Terminus	A01	Colmar towards Basel SNCF
Ebersheim towards Strasbourg	A02a	Colmar Terminus
Scherwiller towards Strasbourg	A07	Terminus
Location

Sélestat station (French: Gare de Sélestat) is a railway station serving the commune of Sélestat, Bas-Rhin department, France. It is located at the junction of the Strasbourg–Basel railway with the branch lines towards Molsheim and Lièpvre. The station is owned and operated by SNCF, in the TER Grand Est regional rail network and is served by TER trains.
