= Strasbourg-Ville station =

Railway station

Strasbourg
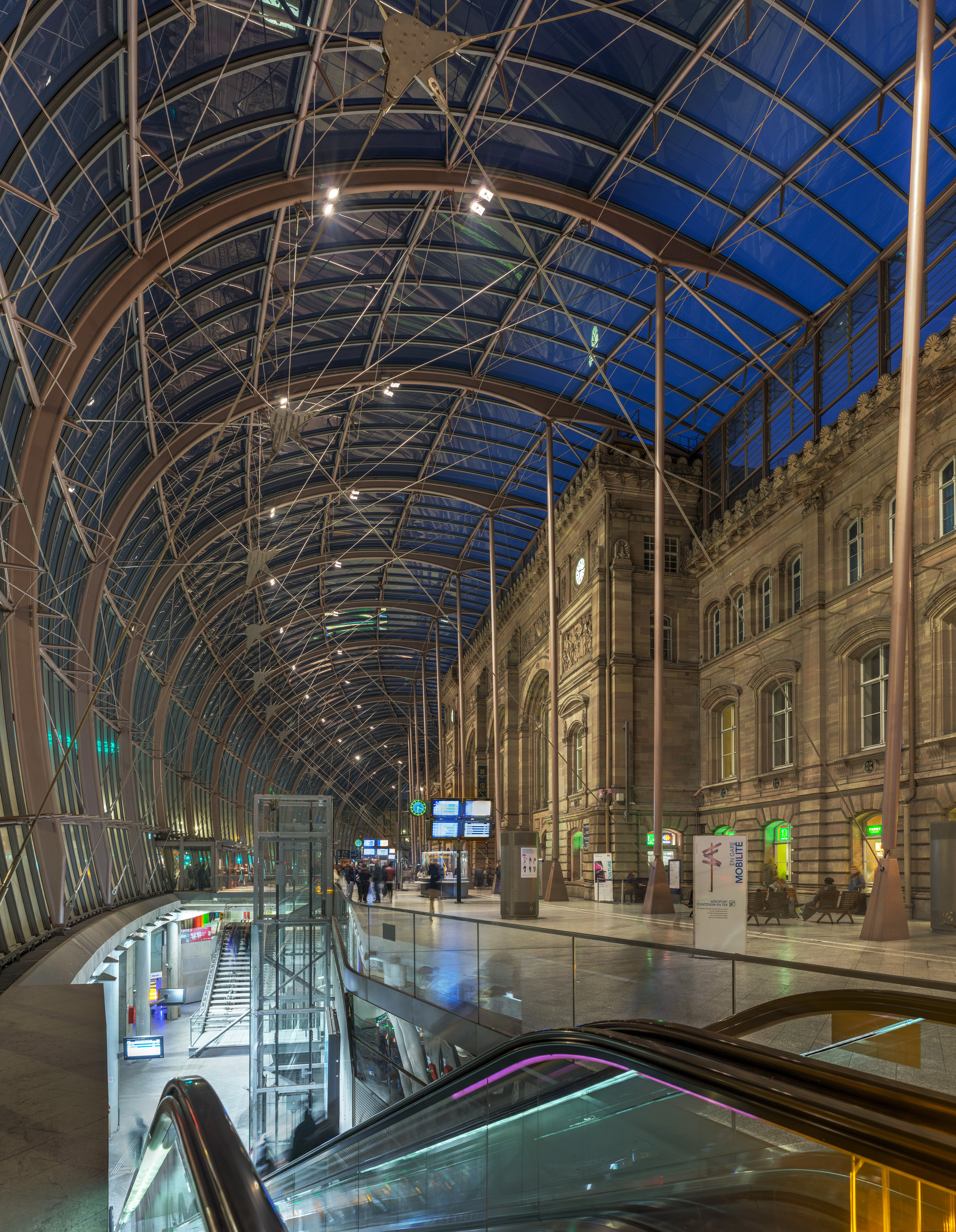
- Original facade under the modern canopy built in 2007

General information
- Location: 20 Place de la gare, 67000 Strasbourg
- Coordinates: 48°35′06″N 7°44′04″E
- Owner: SNCF
- Lines: Paris-Est–Strasbourg-Ville railway Strasbourg–Basel railway Appenweier–Strasbourg railway Strasbourg–Lauterbourg railway Strasbourg–Saint-Dié railway
- Tracks: 13

Construction
- Architect: Johann Eduard Jacobsthal

Other information
- Station code: 87212027
- Website: gare-strasbourg.fr

History
- Opened: 1841
- Rebuilt: 1883

Passengers
- 2024: 24,568,668
Services
Preceding station	SNCF	Following station
Saverne towards Paris-Est	TGV inOui	Terminus
Lorraine TGV towards Bordeaux, Nantes, Rennes, Brussels-South or Lille-Europe	TGV inOui	Terminus
Metz towards Luxembourg	TGV inOui	Colmar (Haut-Rhin) towards Montpellier-Saint-Roch, Montpellier Sud de France or Marseille-Saint-Charles
Nancy-Ville Terminus	TGV inOui	Colmar (Haut-Rhin) towards Nice-Ville
Paris-Est Terminus	TGV inOui	Offenburg towards Freiburg Hbf
Preceding station	DB Fernverkehr	Following station
Paris-Est towards Paris Est	ICE/TGV 83	Karlsruhe Hbf towards München Hbf
Mulhouse-Ville towards Marseille	ICE/TGV 84	Baden-Baden towards Frankfurt (Main) Hbf
Preceding station	Ouigo	Following station
Metz towards Paris-Est	Grande Vitesse	Terminus
Preceding station	TER Grand Est	Following station
Terminus	A01	Sélestat towards Basel SNCF
Terminus	A02a	Graffenstaden towards Colmar
Terminus	A03	Vendenheim towards Sarrebourg
Terminus	A04	Mundolsheim towards Haguenau
Terminus	A05	Bischwiller towards Niederbronn
Mommenheim towards Saarbrücken Hbf	A06	Terminus
Terminus	A07	Entzheim-Aéroport towards Sélestat
Terminus	A08	Entzheim-Aéroport towards Épinal
Terminus	A09	Bischheim towards Lauterbourg
Brumath towards Nancy	A13	Terminus
Brumath towards Metz	A14	Terminus
Strasbourg-Roethig towards Molsheim	A18	Terminus
Bischwiller towards Wissembourg	A34	Terminus
Saverne towards Paris-Est	C02	Terminus
Preceding station	(Offenburg)	Following station
Terminus	RS 4	Krimmeri-Meinau towards Offenburg
Location
- Location within France Location within Europe

Strasbourg-Ville station (French: Gare de Strasbourg-Ville) is the main railway station in the city of Strasbourg, Bas-Rhin, France. It is the eastern terminus of the Paris-Est–Strasbourg-Ville railway. The current core building, an example of historicist architecture of the Wilhelminian period, replaced a previous station inaugurated in 1852, later turned into a covered market and ultimately demolished.
With 24.5 million passengers in 2024, Strasbourg-Ville is one of the busiest railway stations in France outside of the Île-de-France.

== Previous history ==
Strasbourg's first railway station was inaugurated on 19 September 1841 with the opening of the Strasbourg–Basel railway. It was situated far from the city center, in the district of Koenigshoffen. On 11 July 1846, it was moved to the city center; a new building was designed (as a terminus station) by the French architect Jean-André Weyer (1805–??) and inaugurated on 18 July 1852 by Président Bonaparte. After the German annexation of Alsace following the Franco-Prussian War and as part of the general rebuilding of the town after the Siege of Strasbourg, the construction of a larger station (not a terminus station) in the Neustadt was decided and began in 1878. Weyer's station became Strasbourg's central market hall in 1884. It was demolished in 1974.

== Building ==
The historical building of Strasbourg's current railway station was built between 1878 and 1883 by the German architect Johann Eduard Jacobsthal (1839–1902). In 1900, Hermann Eggert, architect of the imperial palace Palais du Rhin, added a special waiting section and staircase for the German emperor, Wilhelm II, now known as the Salon de l'empereur, with stained glass windows by the manufacturers Ott Frères. The historical building was classified as a Monument historique (type "inscrit") on 28 December 1984. Prior to the opening of the high speed train line LGV Est, the station was refurbished by architect Jean-Marie Duthilleul (born 1952) in 2006–2007 and its size and capacity largely increased by the addition of a huge glass roof entirely covering the historical façade. The modernization of the station was bestowed a Brunel Award in 2008.

The main hall is adorned by two larger than life statues of female allegorical figures representing Industry and Agriculture. They are the work of Otto Geyer. Geyer also sculpted the figured reliefs adorning the historical façade, both of which bear his signature.

Works by Otto Geyer (1882)

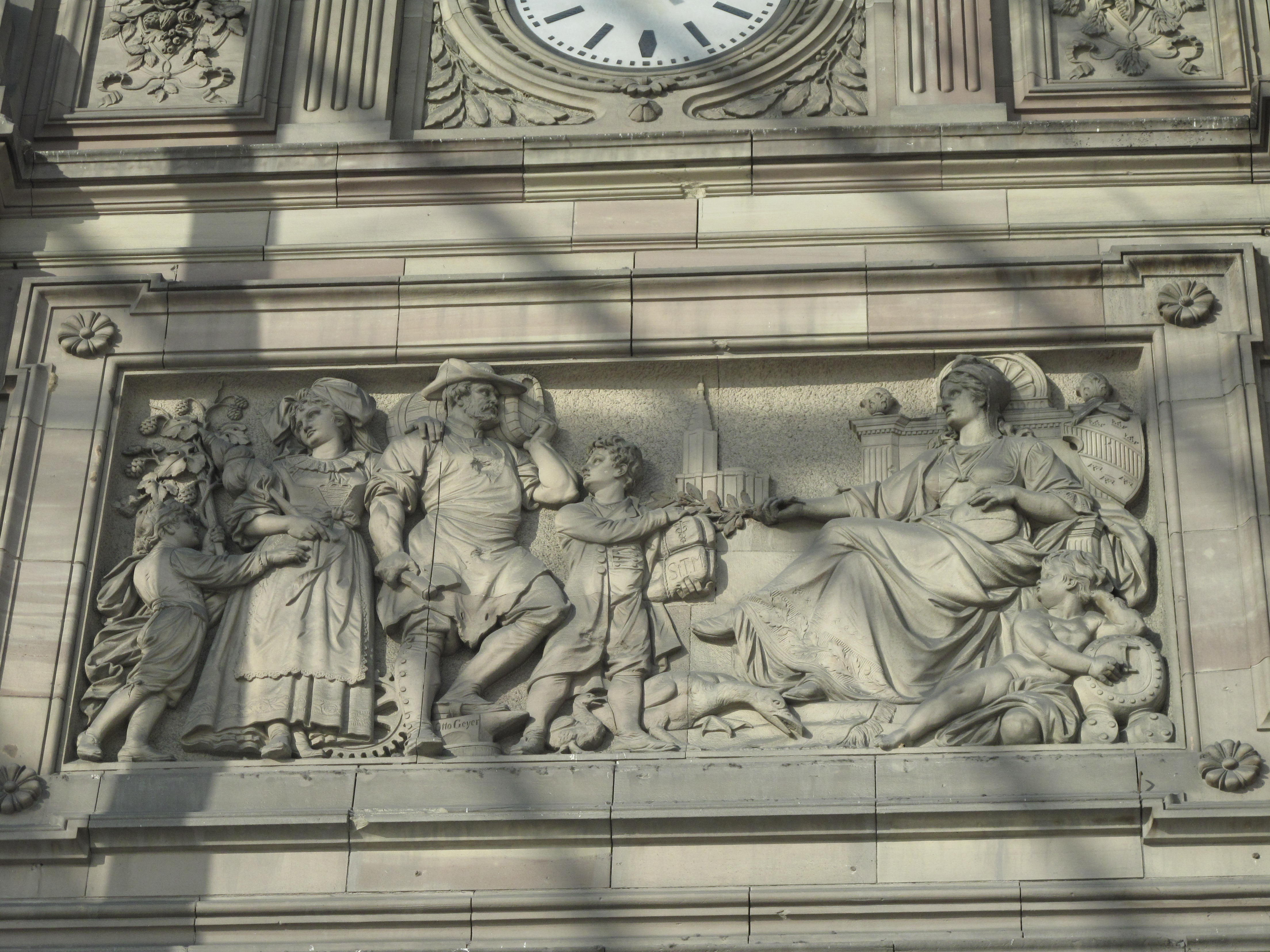
Relief on façade

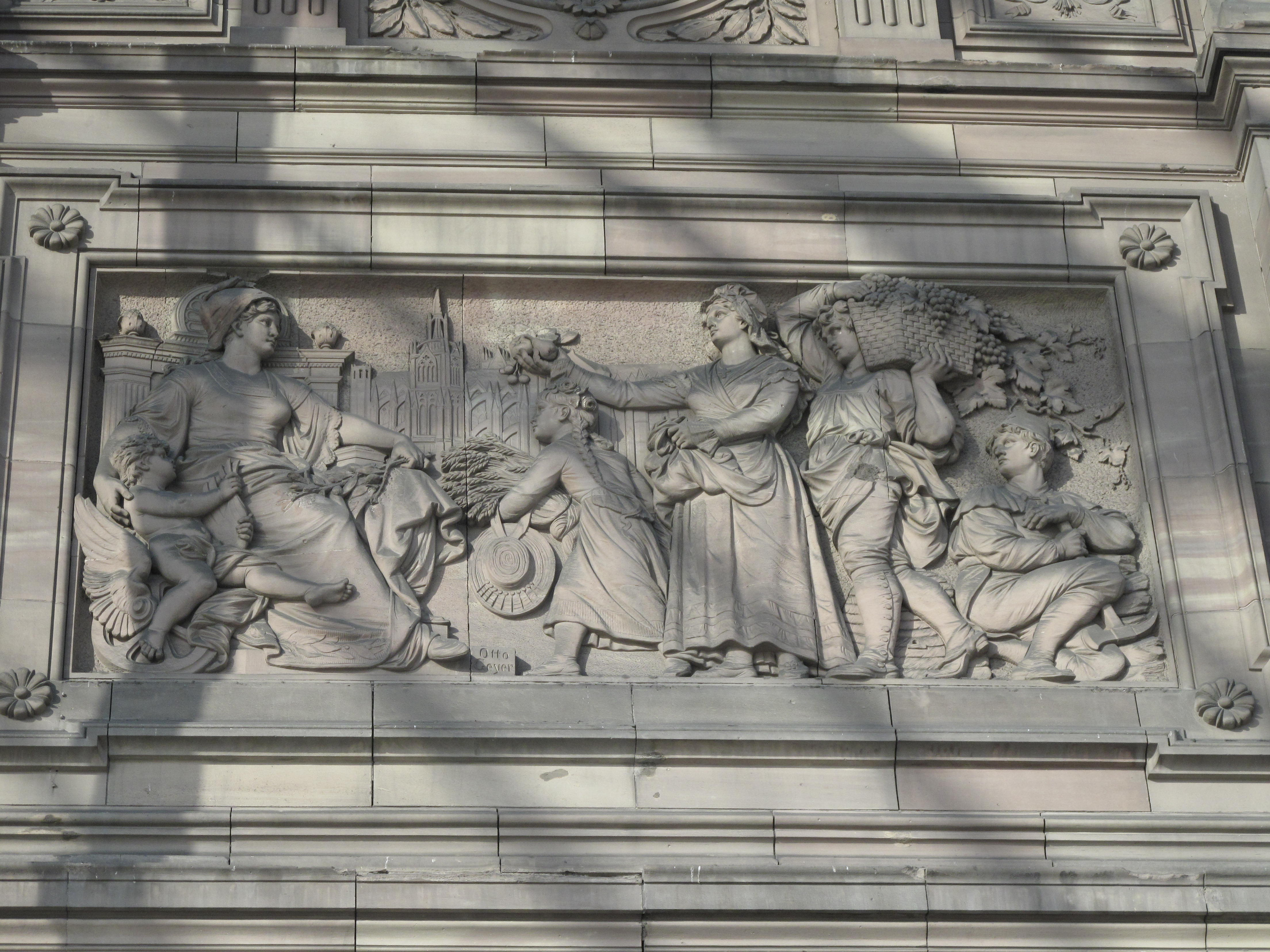
Relief on façade

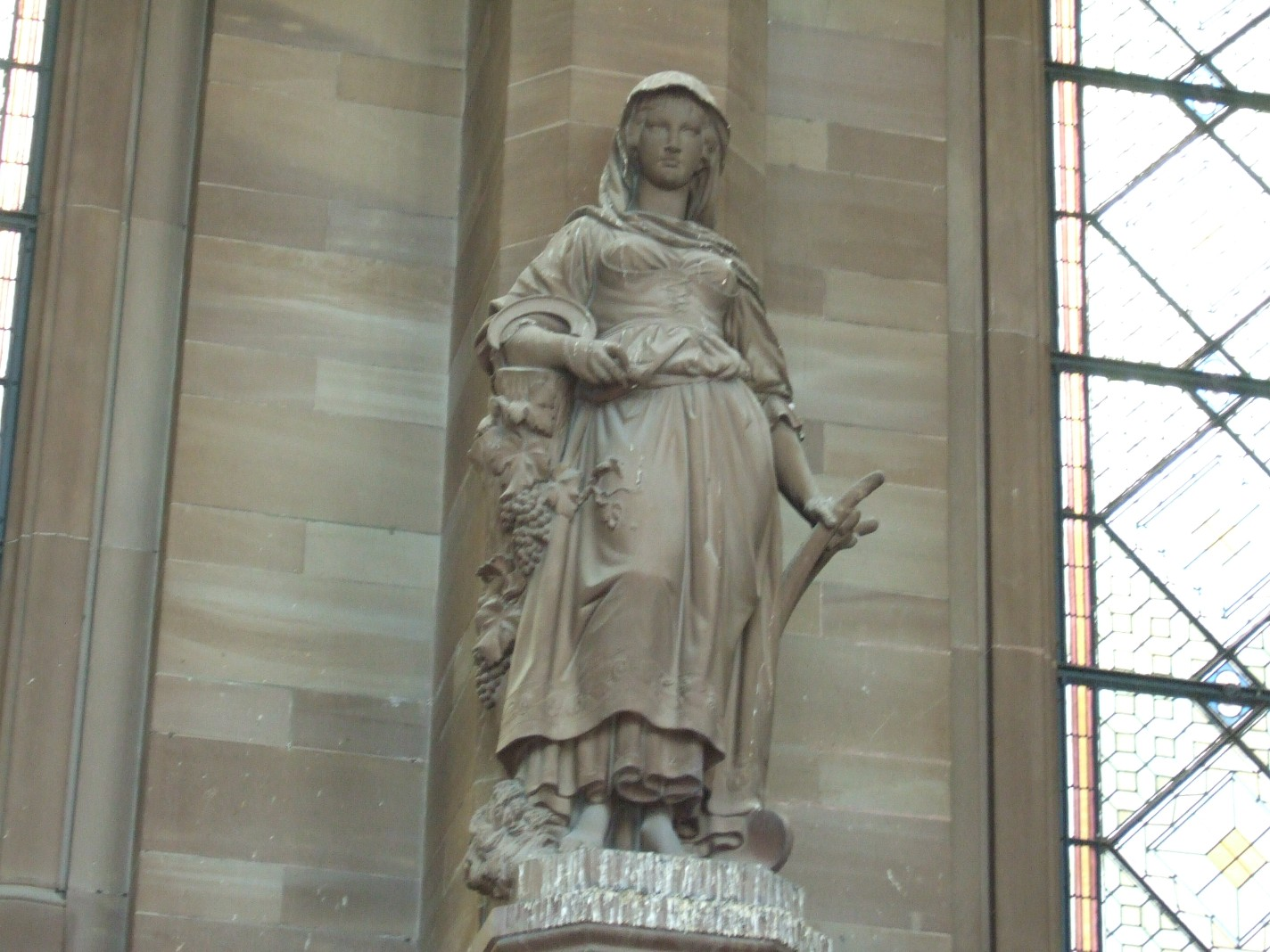
Statue "Agriculture"

The main hall also used to display two frescos by Hermann Knackfuss, painted in 1885, one depicting William I's visit of the fortress Fort Kronprinz in Hausbergen (now Fort Foch, Niederhausbergen), belonging to the fortified belt around Strasbourg, on 3 May 1877 and the other one, as a historical parallel, depicting in Frederick I's arrival in Haguenau in 1164. The two works of art, called Im alten Reich and Im neuen Reich ("In the old Empire" and "In the new Empire") were removed at some point in the 20th century and are lost.

Gare de Strasbourg as viewed from Place de la Gare at dusk, showing the new and old façades

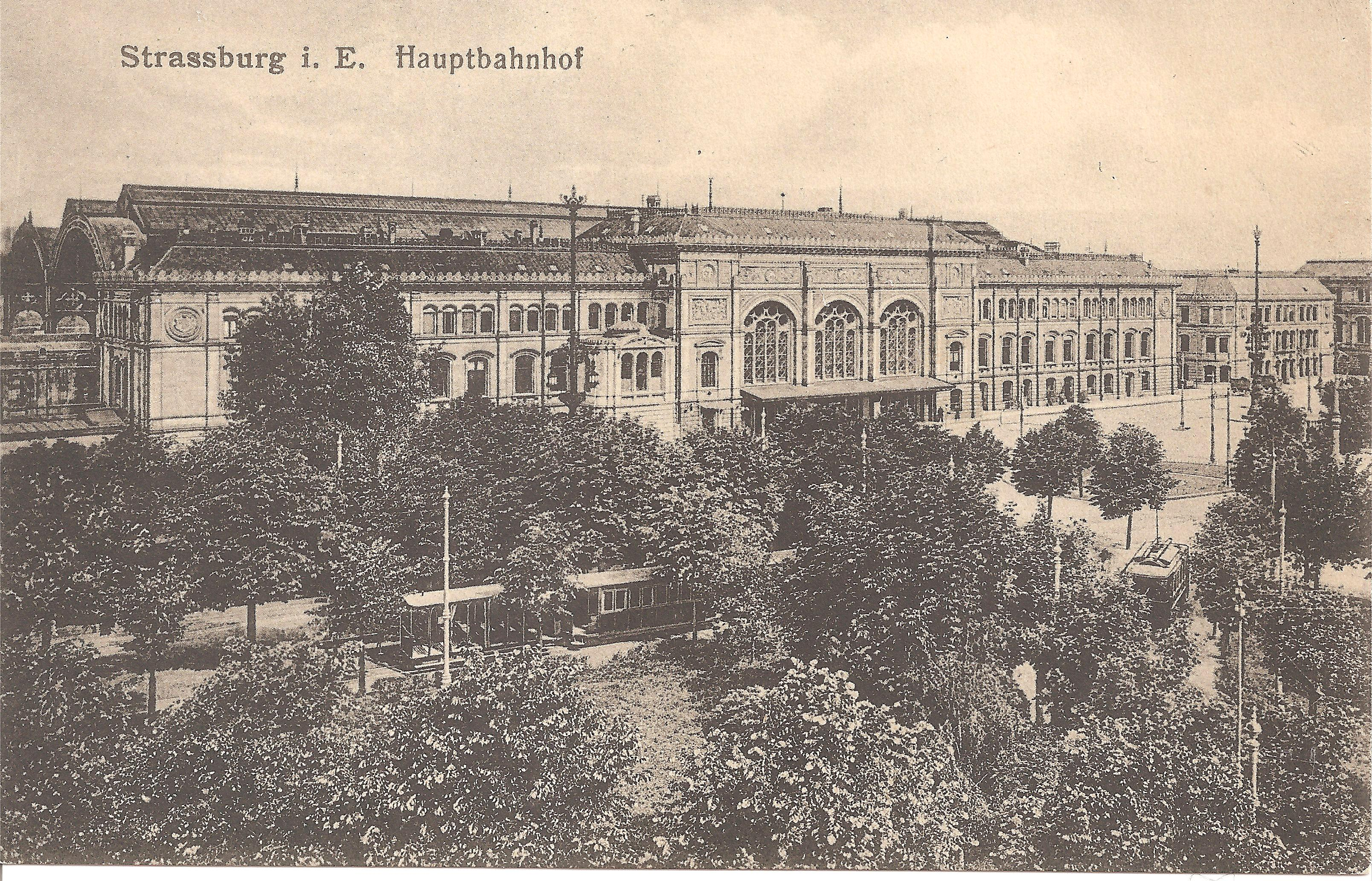
Gare de Strasbourg (then Straßbug Hbf) around 1910

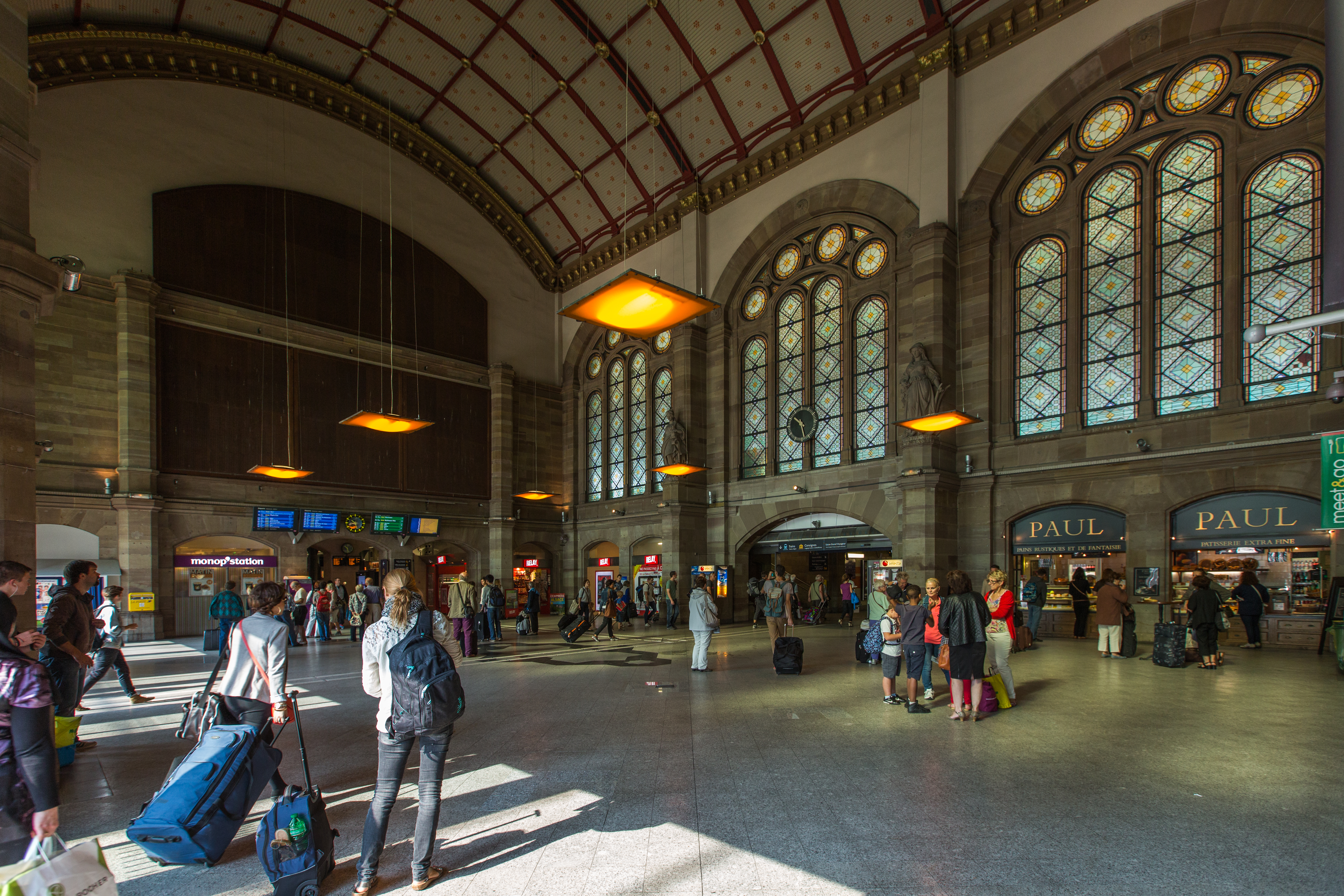
Historical main hall

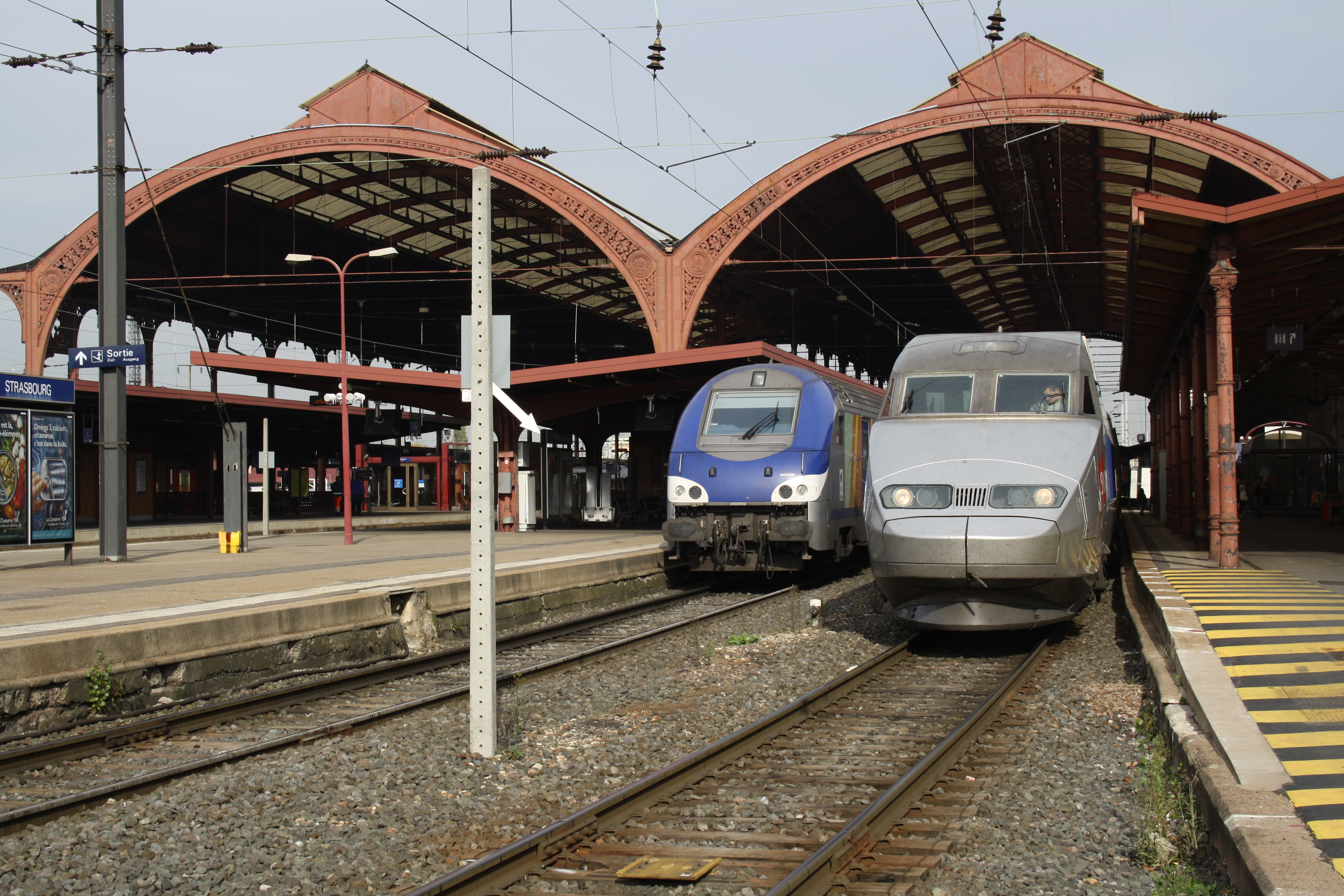
A TGV (right) and a TER (left) in Gare de Strasbourg in 2009

== Services ==
The station is the main station in Strasbourg and one of the main stations in France with over 23.9 million passengers in 2023. TGV service is being assured by the LGV Est, since 2007, and the LGV Rhin-Rhône, since 2011.

=== ICE ===
- (Berlin) - Frankfurt - Karlsruhe - Strasbourg - Paris-Est
- Stuttgart - Karlsruhe - Strasbourg - Paris-Est

=== TGV ===
- Strasbourg - Paris
- Frankfurt - Strasbourg - Marseille
- Munich - Stuttgart - Strasbourg - Paris-Est
- Colmar - Mulhouse - Strasbourg - Paris-Est
- Freiburg - Ringsheim/Europa-Park - Lahr - Offenburg - Strasbourg - Paris-Est
- Strasbourg - Paris CDG Airport - Brussels
- Strasbourg - Rennes
- Strasbourg - Nantes
- Strasbourg - Bordeaux
- Strasbourg - Lyon - Marseille
- Strasbourg - Lyon - Montpellier

=== TER ===
- Strasbourg - Sélestat - Colmar - Mulhouse - Saint Louis - Basel
- Strasbourg - Haguenau
- Strasbourg - Haguenau - Niederbronn-les-Bains
- Strasbourg - Haguenau - Wissembourg
- Strasbourg - Metz
- Strasbourg - Nancy
- Strasbourg - Saint-Dié-des-Vosges - Épinal
- Strasbourg - Sarreguemines - Saarbrücken(D)
- Strasbourg - Kehl - Offenburg (Métro-Rhin and Ortenau-S-Bahn)

=== Combined Air/Rail or Air/Bus travel ===
Some airlines offer combined Air/Rail or Air/Bus tickets to and from Strasbourg-Ville station via Paris CDG and Frankfurt FRA. The codes on the airlines' booking systems are either XWG (Strasbourg Rail Station - Railways) or XER (Strasbourg Rail Station - Buses).

=== Local transport connections ===
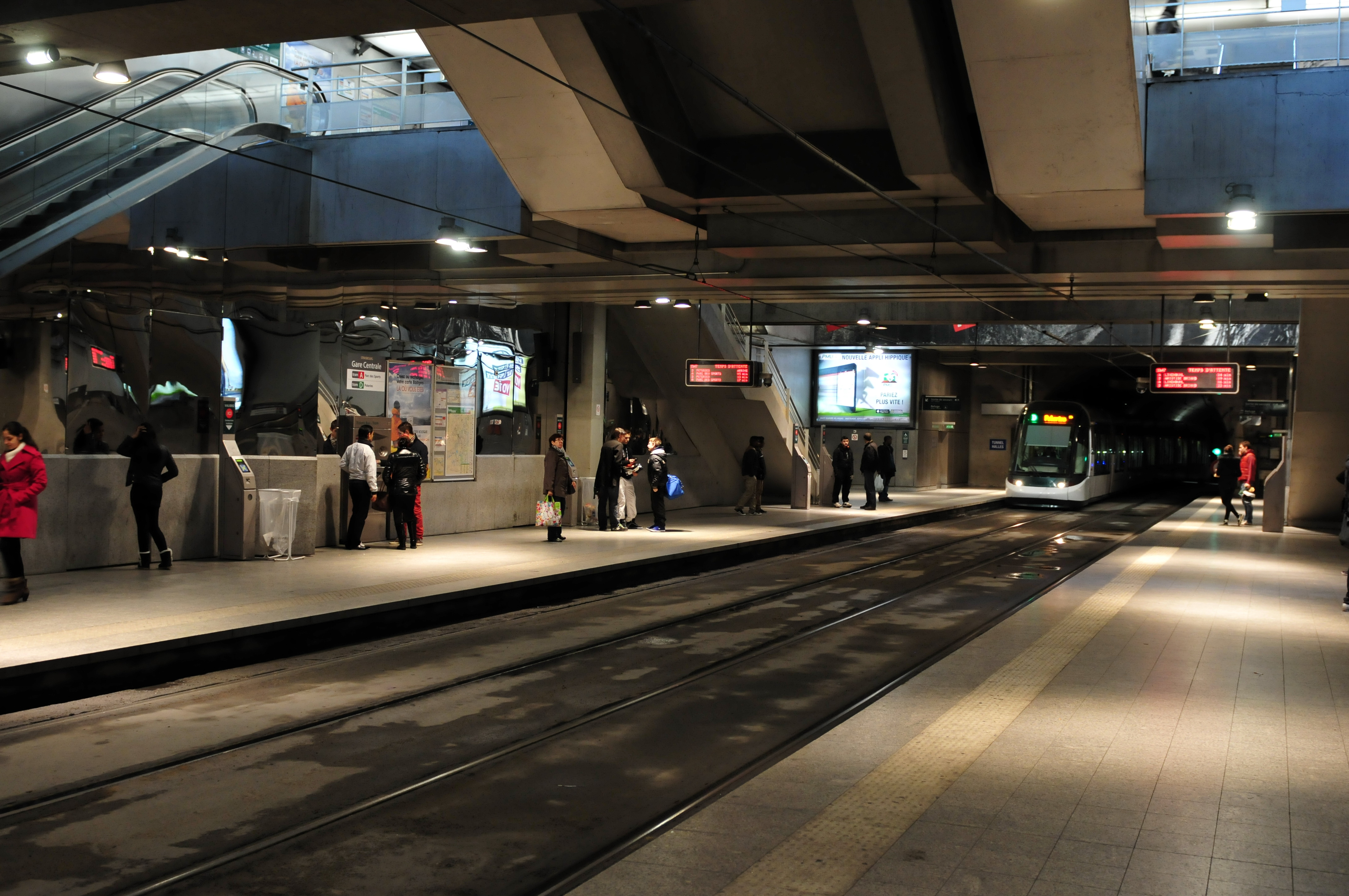
Underground tram station beneath the building

The station also serves lines A, C and D of the Strasbourg tramway. The lines A and D stop in the underground station beneath the actual building, that was inaugurated on 25 November 1994 together with the line A. Line C (opened in 2010) stops overground, on Place de la gare.

The following buses of the CTS stop at the railway station: standard bus lines 2 and 10; BRT lines G and H.

== See also ==
=== Other stations ===
- Gare de Strasbourg-Cronenbourg: goods station
- Gare de Hausbergen: Classification yard
- Gare de Krimmeri-Meinau: halt
- Gare de Strasbourg-Neudorf: goods station
- Gare de Strasbourg-Port-du-Rhin: goods station
- Gare de Strasbourg-Roethig: halt
