= Name days in Sweden =

The Swedish name day calendar is a cultural tradition originating from the Christian Calendar of Saints, where specific calendar dates are associated with given names. While the calendar originally featured only the names of saints and martyrs, following the Protestant Reformation, secular names were also introduced. Celebrating a name day is not uncommon in Sweden.

Several name day lists existed after 1972, when the old name day calendar lost its official status. The current calendar was adopted in 2001 by a work group led by the Swedish Academy. Although it has no official status, it is recognized by most publishers. The new calendar is scheduled for updates every 15 years to reflect evolving naming trends. Six days dedicated to traditional or religious feasts have no personal names attached.

== Current calendar (as of 2001) ==
=== January ===
1. Nyårsdagen (New Year's Day, no name)
2. Svea
3. Alfred, Alfrida
4. Rut
5. Hanna, Hannele
6. Kasper, Melker, Baltsar
7. August, Augusta
8. Erland
9. Gunnar, Gunder
10. Sigurd, Sigbritt
11. Jan, Jannike
12. Frideborg, Fridolf
13. Knut
14. Felix, Felicia
15. Laura, Lorentz
16. Hjalmar, Helmer
17. Anton, Tony
18. Hilda, Hildur
19. Henrik
20. Fabian, Sebastian
21. Agnes, Agneta
22. Vincent, Viktor
23. Frej, Freja
24. Erika
25. Paul, Pål
26. Bodil, Boel
27. Göte, Göta
28. Karl (*), Karla
29. Diana
30. Gunilla, Gunhild
31. Ivar, Joar

=== February ===
1. Max, Maximilian
2. Kyndelsmässodagen (Candlemas, no name)
3. Disa, Hjördis
4. Ansgar, Anselm
5. Agata, Agda
6. Dorotea, Doris
7. Rikard, Dick
8. Berta, Bert
9. Fanny, Franciska
10. Iris
11. Yngve, Inge
12. Evelina, Evy
13. Agne, Ove
14. Valentin
15. Sigfrid
16. Julia, Julius
17. Alexandra, Sandra
18. Frida, Fritiof
19. Gabriella, Ella
20. Vivianne
21. Hilding
22. Pia
23. Torsten, Torun
24. Mattias, Mats
25. Sigvard, Sivert
26. Torgny, Torkel
27. Lage
28. Maria
29. Leap Day (no name)

=== March ===
1. Albin, Elvira
2. Ernst, Erna
3. Gunborg, Gunvor
4. Adrian, Adriana
5. Tora, Tove
6. Ebba, Ebbe
7. Camilla
8. Siv, Saga ( 2018 )
9. Torbjörn, Torleif
10. Edla, Ada
11. Edvin, Egon
12. Viktoria, Victoria (*)
13. Greger
14. Matilda, Maud
15. Kristoffer, Christel
16. Herbert, Gilbert
17. Gertrud
18. Edvard, Edmund
19. Josef, Josefina
20. Joakim, Kim
21. Bengt
22. Kennet, Kent
23. Gerda, Gerd
24. Gabriel, Rafael
25. Marie bebådelsedag (Annunciation to Mary, no name)
26. Emanuel
27. Rudolf, Ralf
28. Malkolm, Morgan
29. Jonas, Jens
30. Holger, Holmfrid
31. Ester

=== April ===
1. Harald, Hervor
2. Gudmund, Ingemund
3. Ferdinand, Nanna
4. Marianne, Marlene
5. Irene, Irja
6. Vilhelm, William ( 2011 )
7. Irma, Irmelin
8. Nadja, Tanja
9. Otto, Ottilia
10. Ingvar, Ingvor
11. Ulf, Ylva
12. Liv
13. Artur, Douglas
14. Tiburtius
15. Olivia, Oliver
16. Patrik, Patricia
17. Elias, Elis
18. Valdemar, Volmar
19. Olaus, Ola
20. Amalia, Amelie
21. Anneli, Annika
22. Allan, Glenn
23. Georg, Göran
24. Vega
25. Markus
26. Teresia, Terese
27. Engelbrekt
28. Ture, Tyra
29. Tyko
30. Mariana

=== May ===
1. Valborg
2. Filip, Phillip (*) Filippa
3. John, Jane
4. Monika, Mona
5. Gotthard Erhard
6. Marit, Rita
7. Carina, Carita
8. Åke
9. Reidar, Reidun
10. Esbjörn, Styrbjörn
11. Märta, Märit
12. Charlotta, Lotta
13. Linnea, Linn
14. Halvard, Halvar
15. Sofia, Sonja
16. Ronald, Ronny
17. Rebecka, Ruben
18. Erik
19. Maj, Majken
20. Karolina, Carola
21. Konstantin, Conny
22. Hemming, Henning
23. Desideria, Desirée
24. Ivan, Vanja
25. Urban
26. Vilhelmina, Vilma
27. Beda, Blenda
28. Ingeborg, Borghild
29. Yvonne, Jeanette
30. Vera, Veronika
31. Petronella, Pernilla

=== June ===
1. Gun, Gunnel
2. Rutger, Roger
3. Ingemar, Gudmar
4. Solbritt, Solveig
5. Bo
6. Gustav, Gösta
7. Robert, Robin
8. Eivor, Majvor
9. Börje, Birger
10. Svante, Boris
11. Bertil, Berthold
12. Eskil
13. Aina, Aino
14. Håkan, Hakon
15. Margit, Margot
16. Axel, Axelina
17. Torborg, Torvald
18. Björn, Bjarne
19. Germund, Görel
20. Linda
21. Alf, Alvar
22. Paulina, Paula
23. Adolf, Alice
24. Johannes Döparens dag (John the Baptist's Day, no name)
25. David, Salomon
26. Rakel, Lea
27. Selma, Fingal
28. Leo
29. Peter, Petra
30. Elof, Leif

=== July ===
1. Aron, Mirjam
2. Rosa, Rosita
3. Aurora
4. Ulrika, Ulla
5. Laila, Ritva
6. Esaias, Jessika
7. Klas
8. Kjell
9. Jörgen, Örjan
10. André, Andrea
11. Eleonora, Ellinor, Leonore (*)
12. Herman, Hermine
13. Joel, Judit
14. Folke
15. Ragnhild, Ragnvald
16. Reinhold, Reine
17. Bruno
18. Fredrik, Fritz
19. Sara
20. Margareta, Greta
21. Johanna
22. Magdalena, Madeleine (*)
23. Emma, Emmy ( 2015 )
24. Kristina, Kerstin
25. Jakob
26. Jesper, Jasmin ( 2015 )
27. Marta
28. Botvid, Seved
29. Olof, Olle
30. Algot
31. Helena, Elin

=== August ===
1. Per
2. Karin, Kajsa
3. Tage
4. Arne, Arnold
5. Ulrik, Alrik
6. Alfons, Inez
7. Dennis, Denise
8. Silvia (*), Sylvia
9. Roland
10. Lars
11. Saint Tiburtius and Saint Susanna
12. Klara
13. Kaj
14. Uno
15. Stella, Estelle {*}
16. Brynolf
17. Verner, Valter
18. Ellen, Lena
19. Magnus, Måns
20. Bernhard, Bernt
21. Jon, Jonna
22. Henrietta, Henrika
23. Signe, Signhild
24. Bartolomeus
25. Lovisa, Louise
26. Östen
27. Rolf, Raoul
28. Fatima, Leila ( 2011 )
29. Hans, Hampus
30. Albert, Albertina
31. Arvid, Vidar

=== September ===
1. Samuel, Sam ( 2011 )
2. Justus, Justina
3. Alfhild, Alva
4. Gisela
5. Adela, Heidi
6. Lilian (*), Lilly
7. Kevin, Roy ( 2011 )
8. Alma, Hulda
9. Anita, Annette
10. Tord, Turid
11. Dagny, Helny
12. Åsa, Åslög
13. Sture
14. Ida, Ronja ( 2018 )
15. Sigrid, Siri
16. Dag, Daga
17. Hildegard, Magnhild
18. Orvar
19. Fredrika
20. Elise, Lisa, James
21. Matteus
22. Maurits, Moritz
23. Tekla, Tea
24. Gerhard, Gert
25. Tryggve
26. Enar, Einar
27. Dagmar, Rigmor
28. Lennart, Leonard
29. Mikael, Mikaela
30. Helge

=== October ===
1. Ragnar, Ragna
2. Ludvig, Love
3. Evald, Osvald
4. Frans, Frank
5. Bror
6. Jenny, Jennifer
7. Birgitta (*), Britta
8. Nils
9. Ingrid, Inger
10. Harry, Harriet
11. Erling, Jarl
12. Valfrid, Manfred
13. Berit, Birgit
14. Stellan
15. Hedvig, Hillevi
16. Finn
17. Antonia, Toini
18. Lukas
19. Tore, Tor
20. Sibylla
21. Ursula, Yrsa
22. Marika, Marita
23. Severin, Sören
24. Evert, Eilert
25. Inga, Ingalill
26. Amanda, Rasmus
27. Sabina
28. Simon, Simone
29. Viola
30. Elsa, Isabella
31. Edit, Edgar

=== November ===
1. Allhelgonadagen (All Saints' Day, no name)
2. Tobias
3. Hubert, Hugo
4. Sverker
5. Eugen, Eugenia
6. Gustav Adolf
7. Ingegerd, Ingela
8. Vendela
9. Teodor, Teodora
10. Martin, Martina
11. Mårten
12. Konrad, Kurt
13. Kristian, Krister
14. Emil, Emilia
15. Leopold
16. Vibeke, Viveka
17. Naemi, Naima
18. Lillemor, Moa
19. Elisabet, Lisbet
20. Pontus, Marina
21. Helga, Olga
22. Cecilia, Sissela
23. Klemens
24. Gudrun, Rune
25. Katarina, Katja
26. Linus
27. Astrid, Asta
28. Malte
29. Sune
30. Andreas, Anders

=== December ===
1. Oskar, Ossian
2. Beata, Beatrice
3. Lydia, Cornelia
4. Barbara, Barbro
5. Sven
6. Nikolaus, Niklas, Nicolas
7. Angela, Angelika
8. Virginia
9. Anna
10. Malin, Malena
11. Daniel, Daniela
12. Alexander, Alexis
13. Lucia
14. Sten, Sixten
15. Gottfrid
16. Assar
17. Stig
18. Abraham
19. Isak
20. Israel, Moses
21. Tomas
22. Natanael, Jonatan
23. Adam
24. Eva
25. Juldagen (Christmas Day, no name)
26. Stefan, Staffan
27. Johannes, Johan
28. Benjamin (also Värnlösa barns dag)
29. Natalia, Natalie
30. Abel, Set
31. Sylvester

== Old calendar (1901–1972) ==
This is the old Swedish name day calendar, sanctioned by the Swedish Academy in 1901, with official status until 1972.

=== January ===
1. Nyårsdagen (no name)
2. Svea
3. Alfred
4. Rut
5. Hanna
6. Trettondedag jul (no name)
7. August
8. Erland
9. Gunnar
10. Sigurd
11. Jan
12. Frideborg
13. Knut
14. Felix
15. Laura
16. Hjalmar
17. Anton
18. Hilda
19. Henrik
20. Fabian
21. Agnes
22. Vincent
23. Emelie
24. Erika
25. Paulus
26. Botilda
27. Göte
28. Karl (*)
29. Valter
30. Gunilla
31. Ivar

=== February ===
1. Max
2. Kyndelsmässodagen (no name)
3. Disa
4. Ansgar
5. Agata
6. Dorotea
7. Rikard
8. Berta
9. Fanny
10. Eugenia
11. Yngve
12. Evelina
13. Agne
14. Valentin
15. Sigfrid
16. Julia
17. Alexandra
18. Frida
19. Gabriella
20. Hulda
21. Hilding
22. Martina
23. Torsten
24. Mattias
25. Sigvard
26. Torgny
27. Lage
28. Maria, Maja
29. (only in Leap Years) (Note: In leap years February 24 was considered leap day with no name associated to it, thus moving the following February name days one day forward.)

=== March ===
1. Ernst
2. Gunborg
3. Adrian
4. Tora
5. Ebba
6. Camilla
7. Filippa
8. Torbjörn
9. Ethel
10. Edvin
11. Viktoria (*)
12. Regina
13. Greger
14. Matilda
15. Kristoffer
16. Herbert
17. Gertrud
18. Edvard
19. Josef
20. Joakim
21. Bengt
22. Viktor
23. Gerda
24. Gabriel
25. Marie bebådelsedag (no name)
26. Emanuel
27. Rudolf
28. Malkolm
29. Jonas
30. Holger
31. Ester, Noa

=== April ===
1. Harald
2. Gudmund
3. Ferdinand
4. Ambrosius
5. Nanna
6. Vilhelm
7. Ingemund
8. Hemming
9. Otto
10. Ingvar
11. Ulf
12. Julius
13. Artur
14. Tiburtius
15. Olivia
16. Patrik
17. Elias
18. Valdemar
19. Olaus Petri
20. Amalia
21. Anselm
22. Albertina
23. Georg
24. Vega
25. Markus
26. Teresia
27. Engelbrekt
28. Ture
29. Tove
30. Mariana

=== May ===
1. Valborg
2. Filip
3. Göta
4. Monika
5. Gotthard
6. Sigmund
7. Gustava
8. Åke
9. Johann
10. Esbjörn
11. Märta
12. Carlos
13. Linnea
14. Halvard
15. Sofia
16. Hilma
17. Rebecka
18. Erik
19. Alrik
20. Karolina
21. Konstantin
22. Henning
23. Desideria
24. Ragnvald
25. Urban
26. Vilhelmina
27. Blenda
28. Ingeborg
29. Baltsar
30. Fritjof
31. Isabella

=== June ===
1. Gun, Gunnel
2. Rutger
3. Ingemar
4. Holmfrid
5. Bo
6. Gustav
7. Robert
8. Salomon
9. Börje
10. Svante
11. Bertil
12. Eskil
13. Aina
14. Håkan
15. Justina
16. Axel
17. Torborg
18. Björn
19. Germund
20. Flora
21. Alf
22. Paulina
23. Adolf
24. Johannes Döparens dag
25. David
26. Rakel
27. Selma
28. Leo
29. Petrus
30. Elof

=== July ===
1. Aron
2. Rosa
3. Aurora
4. Ulrika
5. Melker
6. Esaias
7. Klas
8. Kjell
9. Götilda
10. Anund
11. Eleonora
12. Herman
13. Joel
14. Folke
15. Ragnhild
16. Reinhold
17. Alexis
18. Fredrik
19. Sara
20. Margareta
21. Johanna
22. Magdalena/Madeleine
23. Emma, Emmy
24. Kristina
25. Jakob
26. Jesper
27. Marta
28. Botvid
29. Olof, Olle
30. Algot
31. Helena, Elin

=== August ===
1. Per
2. Kajsa
3. Tage
4. Arne
5. Ulrik
6. Sixten
7. Dennis
8. Sylvia (*)
9. Roland
10. Lars
11. Susanna
12. Klara
13. Hillevi
14. Ebbe
15. Stella
16. Brynolf
17. Verner
18. Helena
19. Magnus
20. Bernhard
21. Josefina
22. Henrietta
23. Signe
24. Bartolomeus
25. Lovisa
26. Östen
27. Rolf
28. Fatima, Leila
29. Hans
30. Albert
31. Arvid

=== September ===
1. Samuel
2. Justus
3. Alfhild, Alva
4. Moses
5. Adela
6. Sakarias
7. Regina
8. Alma
9. Augusta
10. Tord
11. Dagny
12. Tyra
13. Ambjörn
14. Ida
15. Sigrid, Siri
16. Eufemia
17. Hildegard
18. Alvar
19. Fredrika
20. Lisa
21. Matteus
22. Maurits
23. Tekla
24. Gerhard
25. Signild
26. Einar
27. Dagmar
28. Lennart
29. Mikael
30. Helge

=== October ===
1. Ragnar
2. Love, Ludvig
3. Evald
4. Frans
5. Bror
6. Jenny, Jennifer
7. Birgitta
8. Nils
9. Ingrid
10. Helmer
11. Erling
12. Valfrid
13. Teofil
14. Manfred
15. Hedvig
16. Finn
17. Antoinetta
18. Lukas
19. Tore
20. Sibylla (changed from Kasper in 1934)
21. Birger
22. Seved
23. Sören
24. Evert
25. Inga
26. Amanda
27. Sabina
28. Simon
29. Viola
30. Elsa
31. Edit

=== November ===
1. Allhelgonadagen
2. Tobias, Tim
3. Hubert
4. Sverker (changed from Nore in 1905)
5. Eugen
6. Gustav Adolf
7. Ingegerd
8. Vendela
9. Teodor
10. Martin Luther
11. Mårten
12. Konrad
13. Christian
14. Emil
15. Leopold
16. Edmund
17. Napoleon
18. Magnhild
19. Elisabet
20. Pontus
21. Helga
22. Cecilia
23. Klemens
24. Gudrun
25. Katarina
26. Torkel
27. Astrid (changed from Estrid in 1907)
28. Malte
29. Sune
30. Anders

=== December ===
1. Oskar/Oscar
2. Beata
3. Lydia, Cornelia
4. Barbro
5. Sven
6. Nikolaus
7. Agaton
8. Virginia
9. Anna
10. Malin
11. Daniel
12. Alexander
13. Lucia
14. Sten
15. Gottfrid
16. Assar
17. Inge
18. Abraham
19. Isak
20. Israel
21. Tomas
22. Natalie
23. Adam
24. Eva
25. Juldagen (no name)
26. Stefan—Staffan
27. Johannes
28. Menlösa barns dag (no name)
29. Abel
30. Set
31. Sylvester
