= Saints Faith, Hope and Charity =

Group of 2nd century Christian female saints

Saints Faith, Hope, and Charity
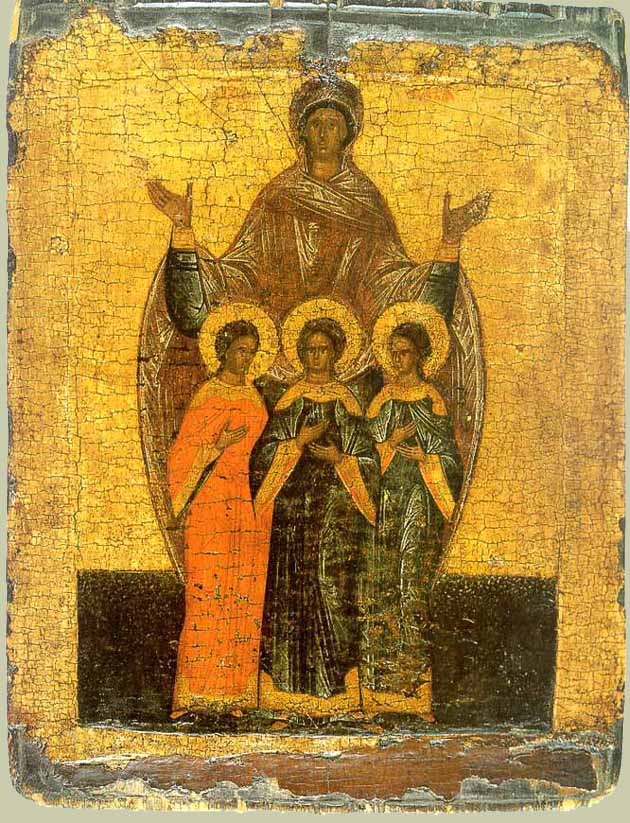
- Saints Faith, Hope, and Charity with their mother Sophia

Virgin Martyrs
- Born: 2nd Century AD
- Died: 2nd Century AD
- Venerated in: Eastern Orthodox Church; Roman Catholic Church; Armenian Apostolic Church
- Feast: 1 August (previous editions of Roman Martyrology); 17 September (Eastern Orthodox Church); Thursday after third Sunday of Transfiguration (Armenian Apostolic Church)

Saints Faith, Hope, and Charity (or Love) (Latin: Fides, Spes et Caritas) are a group of Christian martyred, virgin, saints who are venerated together with their mother, Sophia ("Wisdom").

Although earlier editions of the Roman Martyrology commemorated Saints Faith, Hope and Charity on 1 August and their mother Sophia on 30 September, the present text of this official but professedly incomplete catalogue of saints of the Roman Catholic Church has no feast dedicated to the three saints or their mother: the only Sophia included is an early Christian virgin martyr of Picenum in Italy, commemorated with her companion Vissia on 12 April; another early Christian martyr, Saint Faith (Fides), of Aquitania (southern France), is celebrated on 6 October, a Saint Hope (Spes), an abbot of Nursia who died in about 517, is commemorated on 23 May, and saint Charity (Caritas) is included, although saints with somewhat similar names, Carissa and Carissima, are given, respectively under 16 April and 7 September. Their feast day of August 1 was not entered in the General Roman Calendar, and they have since been removed from the Roman Martyrology.

References of the time of Gregory the Great suggest two groups of martyrs, mother and daughters, one buried on the Aurelian Way and the other on the Via Appia. According to the Passio, Sophia was a widow of Milan who gave away her possessions and moved to Rome with her daughters. Her daughters were martyred before her and she buried them at Via Appia. She died a natural death three days later while praying at the grave of her daughters. The oldest version of the Passio is BHL 2966. Caesar Baronius introduced the saints to the Roman Martyrology in the late 16th century.

Their tomb in a crypt beneath the church afterwards erected to Saint Pancratius was long a place of resort for pilgrims, as detailed in various documents of the seventh century, such as an Itinerarium (or guide to the holy places of Rome compiled for the use of pilgrims) still preserved at Salzburg, the list, preserved in the cathedral archives of Monza, of the oils gathered from the tombs of the martyrs and sent to Queen Theodelinda in the time of Gregory the Great, etc.

Saxer (2000) notes that early Christians from the 4th century indeed often took in baptism mystical names indicative of Christian virtues, and Sophia, Sapientia, and Fides are attested as names of Christian women in Catacomb inscriptions. The veneration of the three saints named for the three theological virtues probably arose in the 6th century based on such inscriptions. Critical scholarship is unanimous in assuming that the hagiographical tradition is spurious, likely inspired by Latin inscriptions referring to the theological either to concepts of Holy Wisdom, Faith, Hope and Charity. Her veneration is first recorded in the late 6th century, her being mentioned in the inventory of holy chrisms collected on behalf of Theodelinda, queen of the Lombards.

The veneration of Sophia of Milan became indistinguishable from that of Sophia of Rome in the medieval period. Relics either of her or of Sophia of Rome were transferred to the women's convent at Eschau in Alsace in 778 from where her cult spread to Germany. She is the patroness saint of widows. A 14th-century fresco of the saints is in St. Agnes chapel in Cologne Cathedral.

== See also ==
- St Trophimus' Church, Eschau, where their relics are venerated
- St Faith of Aquitaine
- Holy Wisdom
