= Hamrin (surname) =

Hamrin is a surname. Notable people with the surname include:

- Felix Hamrin (1875–1937), Swedish Liberal politician, briefly Prime Minister in 1932
- Jan Hamrin
- Kurt Hamrin (1934-2024), Swedish footballer
- Midde Hamrin (born 1957), Swedish long-distance runner
- Sven Hamrin (1941–2018), Swedish cyclist
- Ulf Hamrin (born 1946), Swedish writer
