= Ulf =

Ulf, or Ulv is a masculine given name. It derives from the Old Norse word for "wolf" (úlfr, see Wulf). The female form is Ylva. Notable people with the name include:

- Ulf the Earl, brother-in-law of Cnut the Great and regent of Denmark
- Ulf Adelsohn, Swedish politician, former leader of Moderata Samlingspartiet and county governor of Stockholm
- Ulf Andersson, Swedish chess player
- Ulf Björlin (1933–1993), Swedish conductor, composer, pianist, arranger, music producer
- Ulf Dahlén, Swedish ice hockey player
- Ulf Dextegen (born 1960), Swedish hypnotherapist and champion freediver
- Ulf Ekberg, Swedish pop musician
- Ulf Ekman, Swedish pastor, leader of Livets Ord
- Ulf Eriksson, Swedish footballer
- Ulf von Euler, Swedish physiologist
- Ulf Fase, Swedish jarl during the Middle Ages
- Ulf Fink (1942–2025), German politician
- Ulf Friberg (born 1962), Swedish actor and film director
- Ulf Georgsson (born 1962), Swedish songwriter
- Ulf Gustafsson (born 1937), Swedish rower
- Ulf Hamrin (born 1946), Swedish writer
- Ulf Hohmann, German ethology researcher
- Ulf Isaksson (1954–2003), Swedish ice hockey player
- Ulf Kristersson, Swedish politician, Prime Minister of Sweden since 2022
- Ulf Kirsten, German soccer player
- Ulf Kortesniemi (born 1966), Finnish former footballer
- Ulf Larsson, Swedish actor and TV host
- Ulf Linde, Swedish art critic, writer, museum director
- Ulf Lohmann, German electronic music producer
- Ulf Lönnqvist, Swedish politician
- Ulf Lundell, Swedish author and rock musician
- Ulf Lundkvist, Swedish comic creator, illustrator, and painter
- Ulf Merbold, German astronaut (retired) and glider pilot
- Ulf Nilsson, Swedish ice hockey player
- Ulf Olsson, Swedish murderer
- Ulf Ottosson, Swedish soccer player, Mål-Otto
- Ulf Palme, Swedish film actor
- Ulf Pilgaard, Danish actor
- Ulf the Quarrelsome, brother (or sometimes identified as stepson) to Brian Boru
- Ulf Samuelsson (born 1964), Swedish ice hockey player
- Ulf Schmidt, Swedish tennis player
- Ulf Stenberg (born 1979), Swedish actor and theater director
- Ulf Timmermann, East German shot putter

== See also ==
- ULF (disambiguation)
