= Remigius of Strasbourg =

Remigius or Remedius of Strasbourg (died 20 March 783 or 782) was a Bishop of Strasbourg. He was also wrongly known as Benignus.

== Life ==
Recent research has disproved previous assertions that he belonged to the Etichonids, was closely related to Odile of Alsace or originated in Provence.

He was probably already working in Strasbourg during the time of Bishop Heddo, who supported him. A later discredited legend states he was abbot in Munster, Haut-Rhin.

It is unclear when he became bishop and who he succeeded in that role. It may have been from 765 onwards. His will is definitively dated to 778, falling during his bishopric, co-signed by many other bishops and forming the main source for his work in Strasbourg - it survives only in a 12th-century copy but is one of the most important documents of its type from the Merovingian and Carolingian Frankish Empire.

After becoming bishop, he made a pilgrimage to Rome no earlier than 772. There he was given the relics of Saint Sophia by Pope Hadrian I to take to Eschau Monastery, which he founded. In his will he transferred that monastery and the distant monastery in Aaregau or Schönenwerd to Strasbourg Cathedral. Much of Eschau's possessions came from Odile's relatives - he transferred those possessions to the cathedral but reserved the usufruct of part of the interest for himself, his niece and her son. The will also stipulated that he would be buried in the crypt he had built, probably at Eschau rather than the cathedral.

During the period of conflict between the Merovingians and Carolingians, he strove to ensure the Diocese of Strasbourg was included in the Imperial Church. Like Chrodegang in Metz, he backed close links between the Pope and the Frankish Empire. He also strove for greater Christianisation in rural areas by supporting churches and monasteries, as well as seeking stronger personal and economic ties between the different parts of the Empire.
