= Eschau, Bas-Rhin =

Eschau Aschöi
- Commune
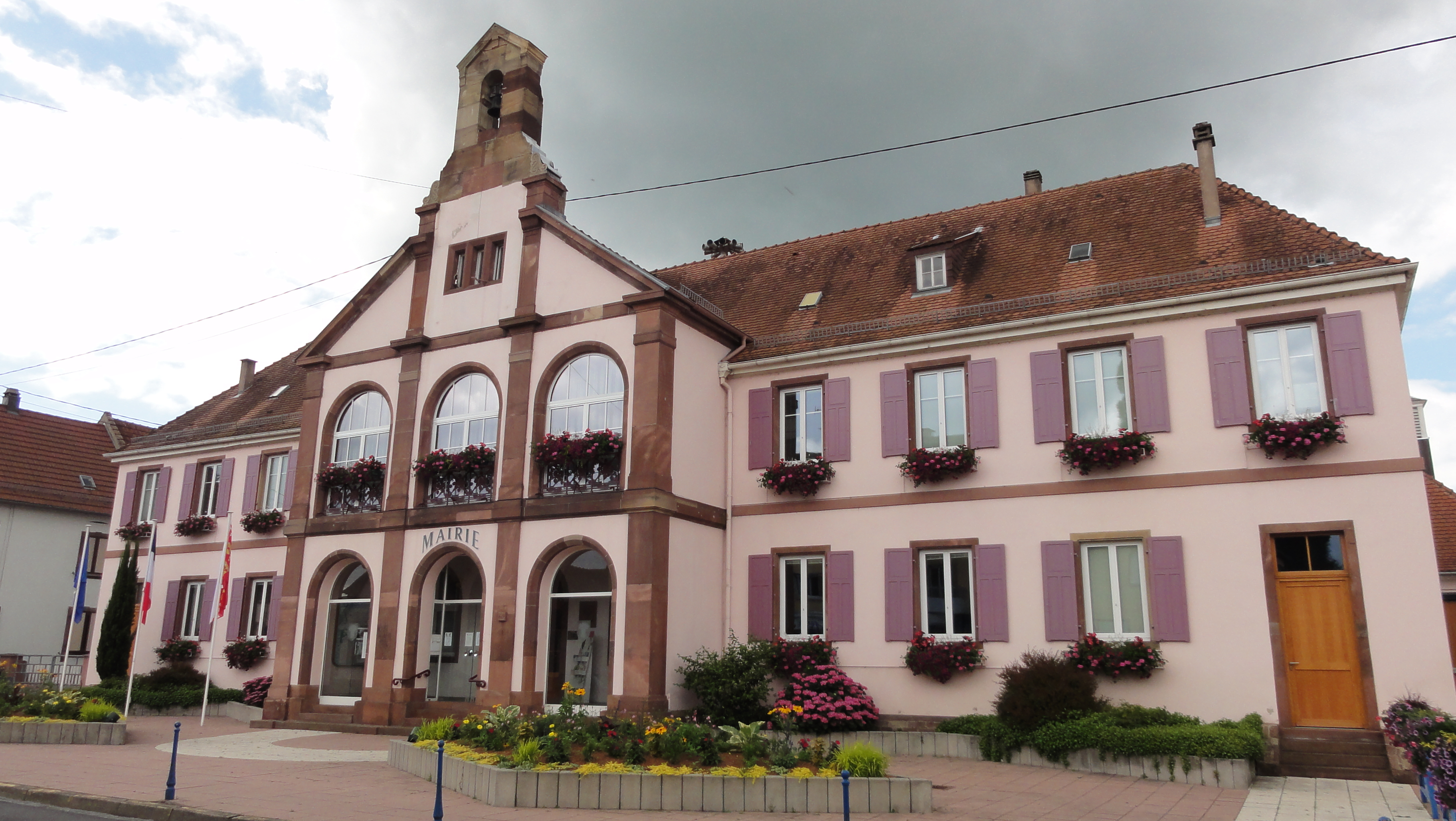
- The town hall in Eschau

- Coat of arms
- Location of Eschau
- Location within France Location within Grand Est
- Coordinates: 48°29′19″N 7°43′00″E
- Country: France
- Region: Grand Est
- Department: Bas-Rhin
- Arrondissement: Strasbourg
- Canton: Illkirch-Graffenstaden
- Intercommunality: Strasbourg Eurométropole

Government
  - Mayor (2020–2026): Yves Sublon
- Area^{1}: 11.83 km^{2} (4.57 sq mi)
- Highest elevation: 148 m (486 ft)
- Lowest elevation: 142 m (466 ft)
- Population (2023): 5,878
  - Density: 496.9/km^{2} (1,287/sq mi)
- Time zone: UTC+01:00 (CET)
  - Summer (DST): UTC+02:00 (CEST)
- INSEE/Postal code: 67131 /67114
- ^{1} French Land Register data, which excludes lakes, ponds, glaciers > 1 km^{2} (0.386 sq mi or 247 acres) and river estuaries.

Eschau (French pronunciation: [ɛʃo]; Alsatian: Àschoei) is a commune in the Bas-Rhin department in Grand Est in north-eastern France.

It is situated 8 km south of Strasbourg.

== Population ==
Historical population
Year	Pop.	±% p.a.
1968	2,490	—
1975	2,881	+2.11%
1982	3,109	+1.09%
1990	3,828	+2.63%
1999	4,410	+1.59%
2007	4,804	+1.08%
2012	4,738	−0.28%
2017	5,303	+2.28%
2023	5,878	+1.73%
Source: INSEE

== Sights ==
Eschau's main sight is the Église Saint-Trophime, a Romanesque church dedicated to Trophimus of Arles. The building dates back to the 8th century but has been rebuilt several times until the end of the 13th century. It contains relics of Sophia the Martyr in a Gothic chasse and several wooden polychrome 15th-century Gothic statues. The 12th-century cloister has been destroyed but several capitals and other pieces of Romanesque sculpture by the Master of Eschau have survived and are on display in the Musée de l'Œuvre Notre-Dame.

== See also ==
- Communes of the Bas-Rhin department
