= Master of Andlau =

Alsatian Romanesque sculptor

The Master of Andlau (French: Maître d'Andlau) is the notname given to an Alsatian Romanesque sculptor and his workshop, active in the middle of the 12th century.

The Master's name derives from the relief sculptures of the main portal and the frieze around Andlau Abbey church. Fragments of other works by the Master are housed in the Musée de l’Œuvre Notre-Dame in Strasbourg and in the Unterlinden Museum in Colmar.

== Gallery ==
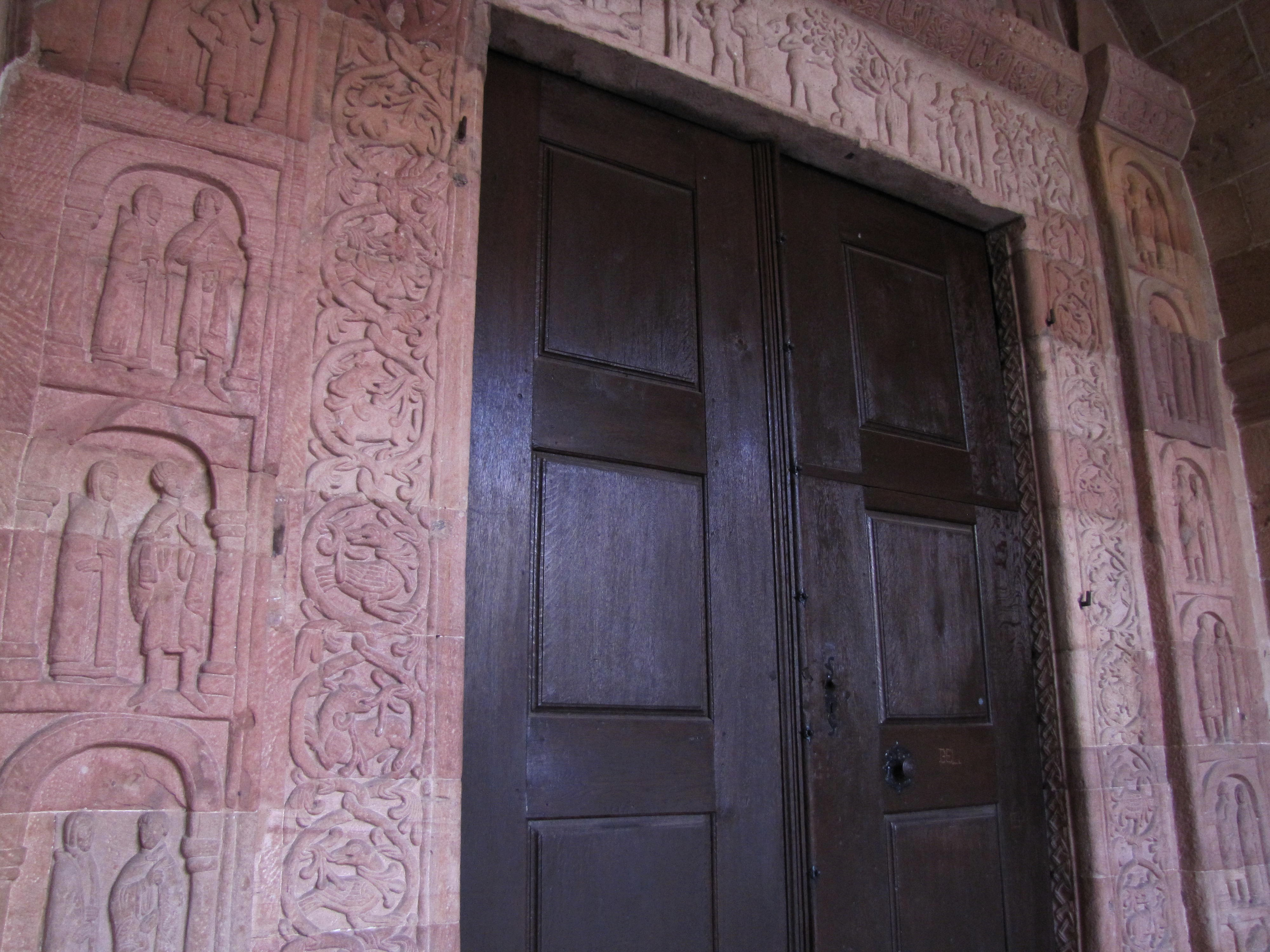
Detail of the Andlau portal

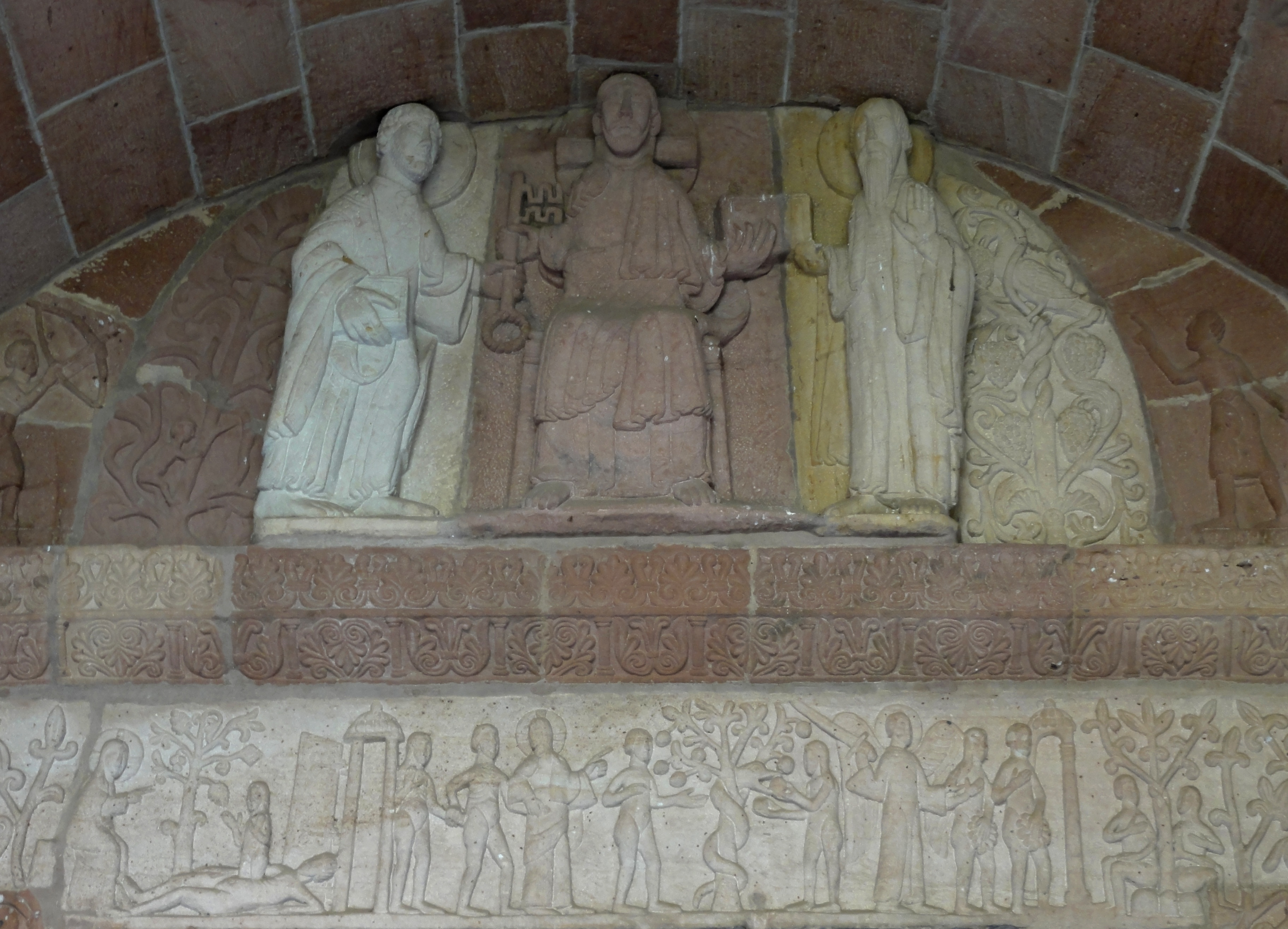
Detail of the Andlau portal

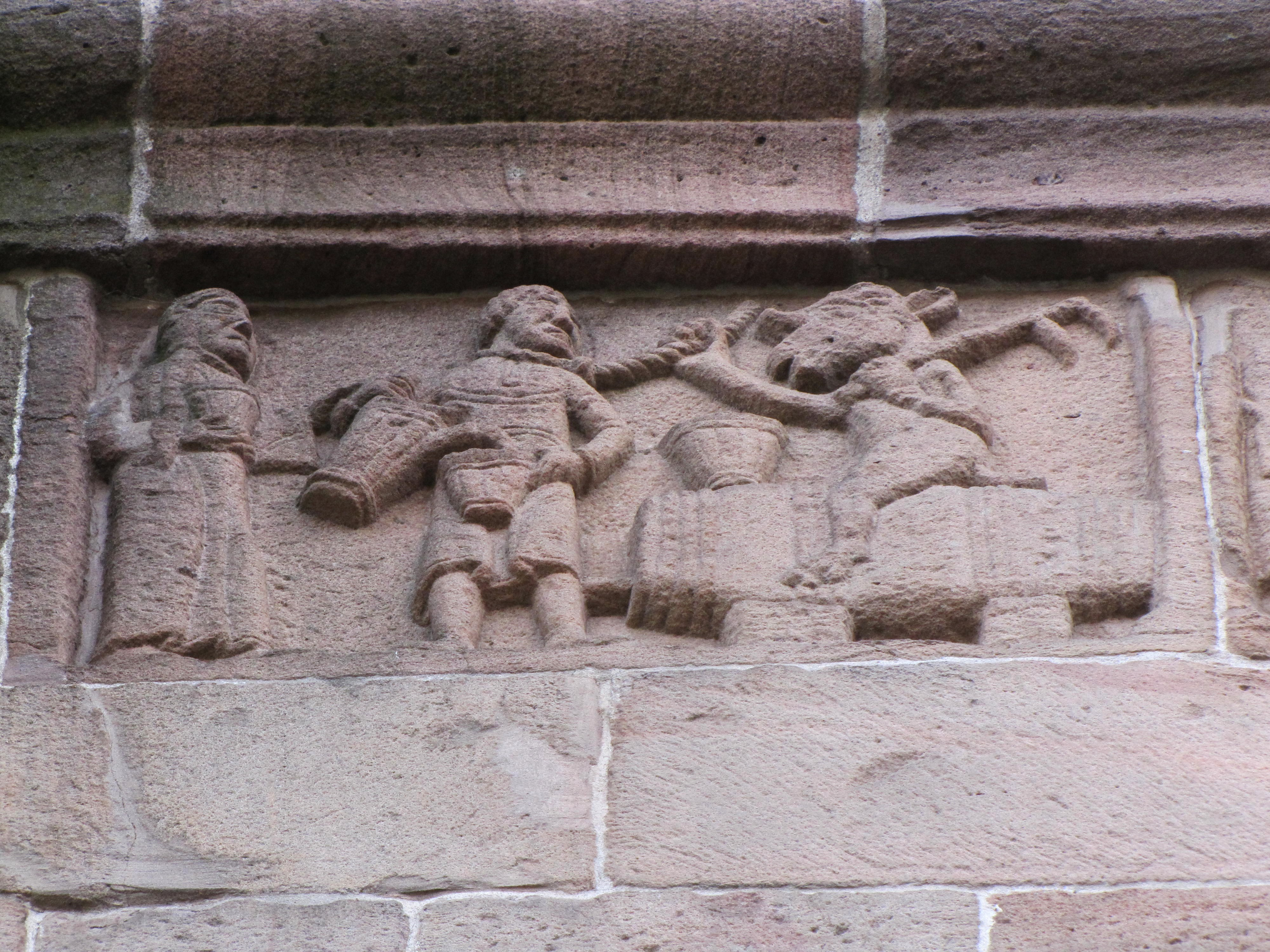
Detail of the Andlau frieze

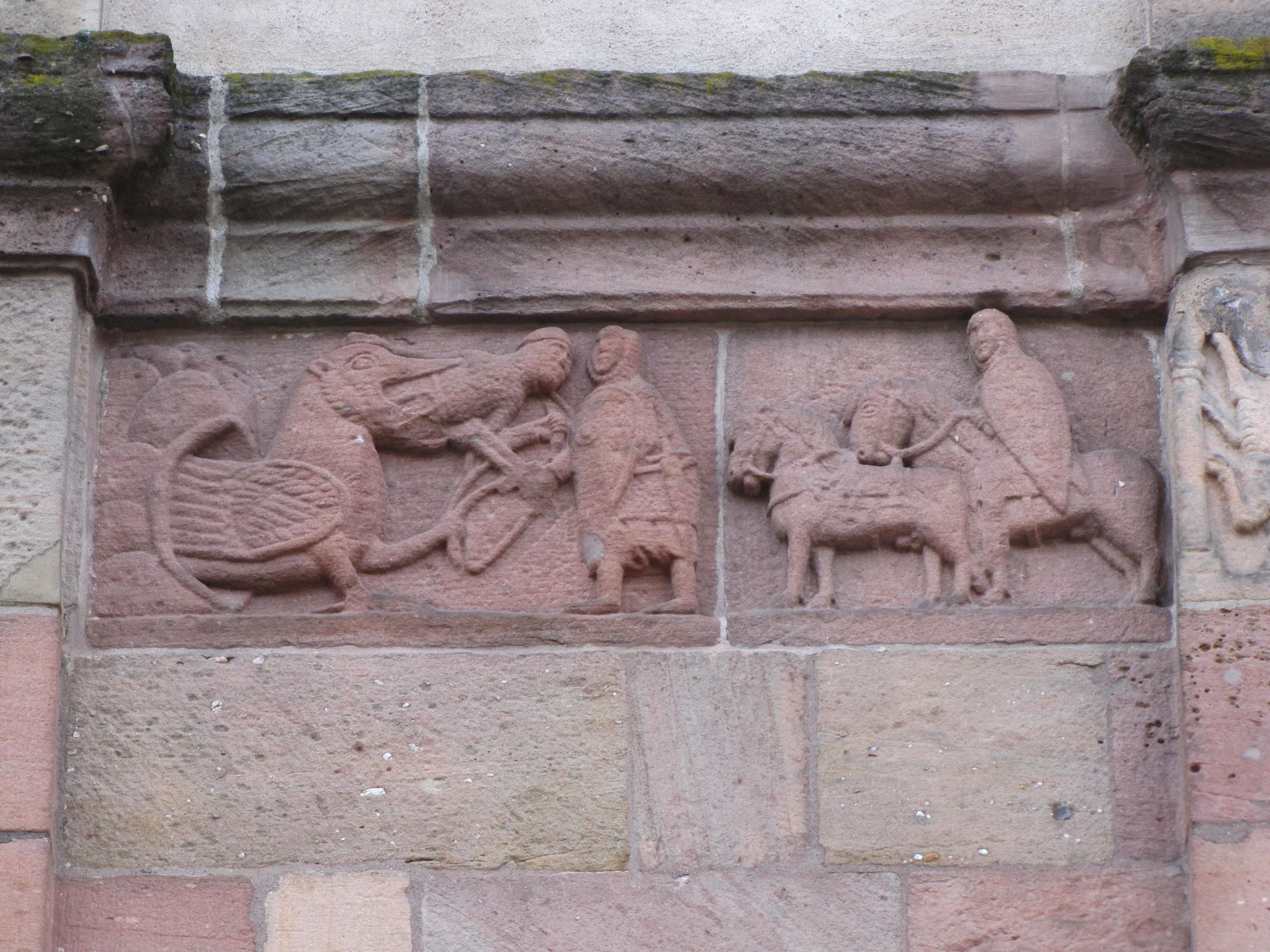
Detail of the Andlau frieze

== See also ==
- Master of Eschau
