= ULF =

Ulf is a common first name in Europe, especially in Scandinavia. ULF can refer to:

- Ultra Large Format, used for cameras producing negatives larger than 8" x 10"
- Ultra Low Floor, is a type of tram
- Ultra low frequency, the radio frequency band from 300 Hz to 3 kHz
- United Labour Front, a defunct political party in Trinidad and Tobago
- Upplands lantarbetareförbund (Farm Workers Union of Uppland), a Swedish farm workers union
