= Master of Eschau =

The Master of Eschau (French: Maître d'Eschau) is the notname given to an Alsatian Romanesque sculptor and his workshop, active in the first half of the 12th century.

The Master's name derives from the sculptures (capitals, baptismal font) from the cloister and the church of St Trophimus in Eschau, Bas-Rhin. Most of the remains of his sculpted work from that location are displayed in the Musée de l’Œuvre Notre-Dame in Strasbourg. The Master is also considered to be the author of the sarcophagus of bishop Adelochus of Strasbourg (died 823). That work, dated around 1130 or 1144, is displayed in the Église Saint-Thomas of Strasbourg.

== Gallery ==
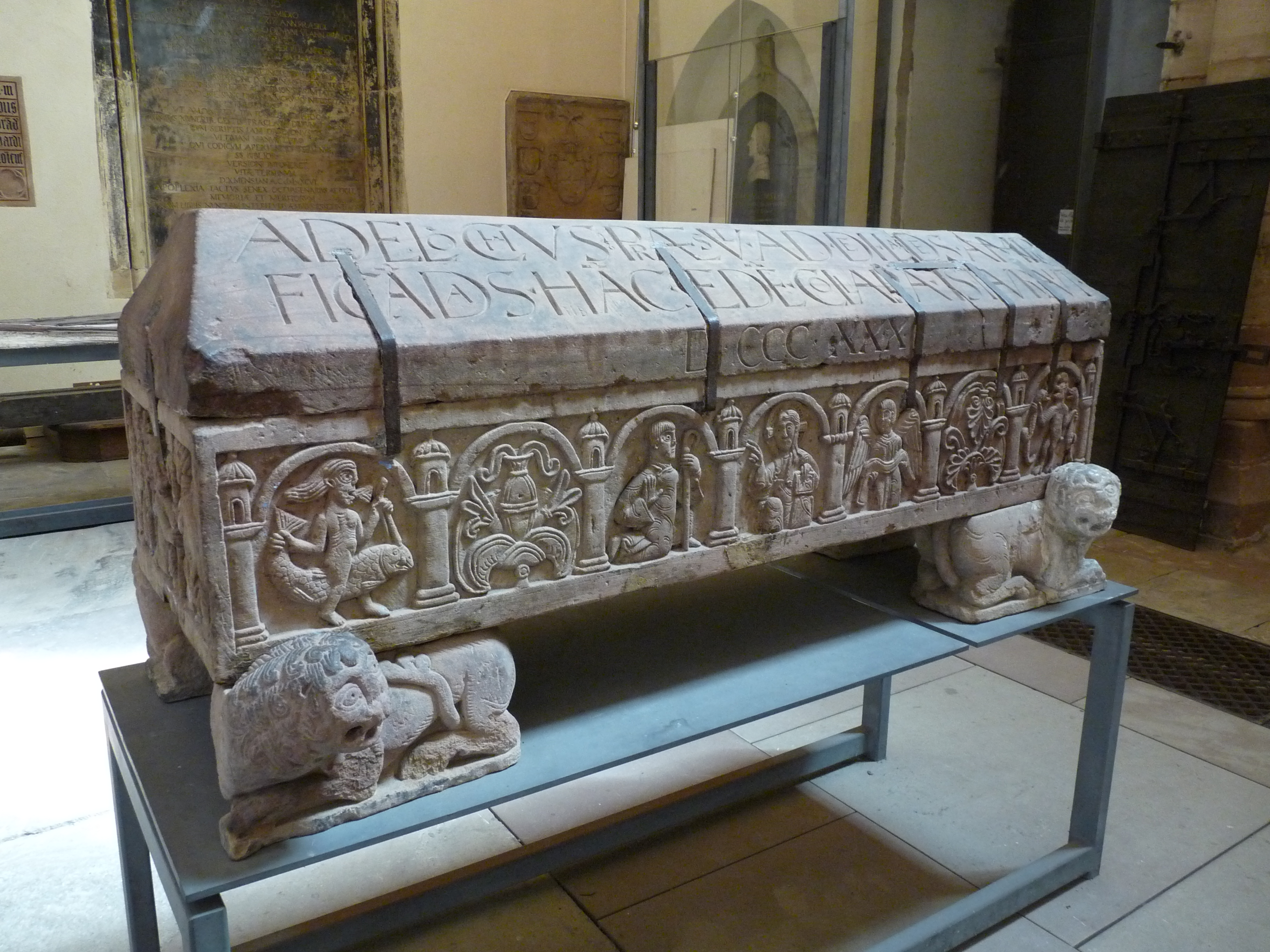
Sarcophagus of Adelochus

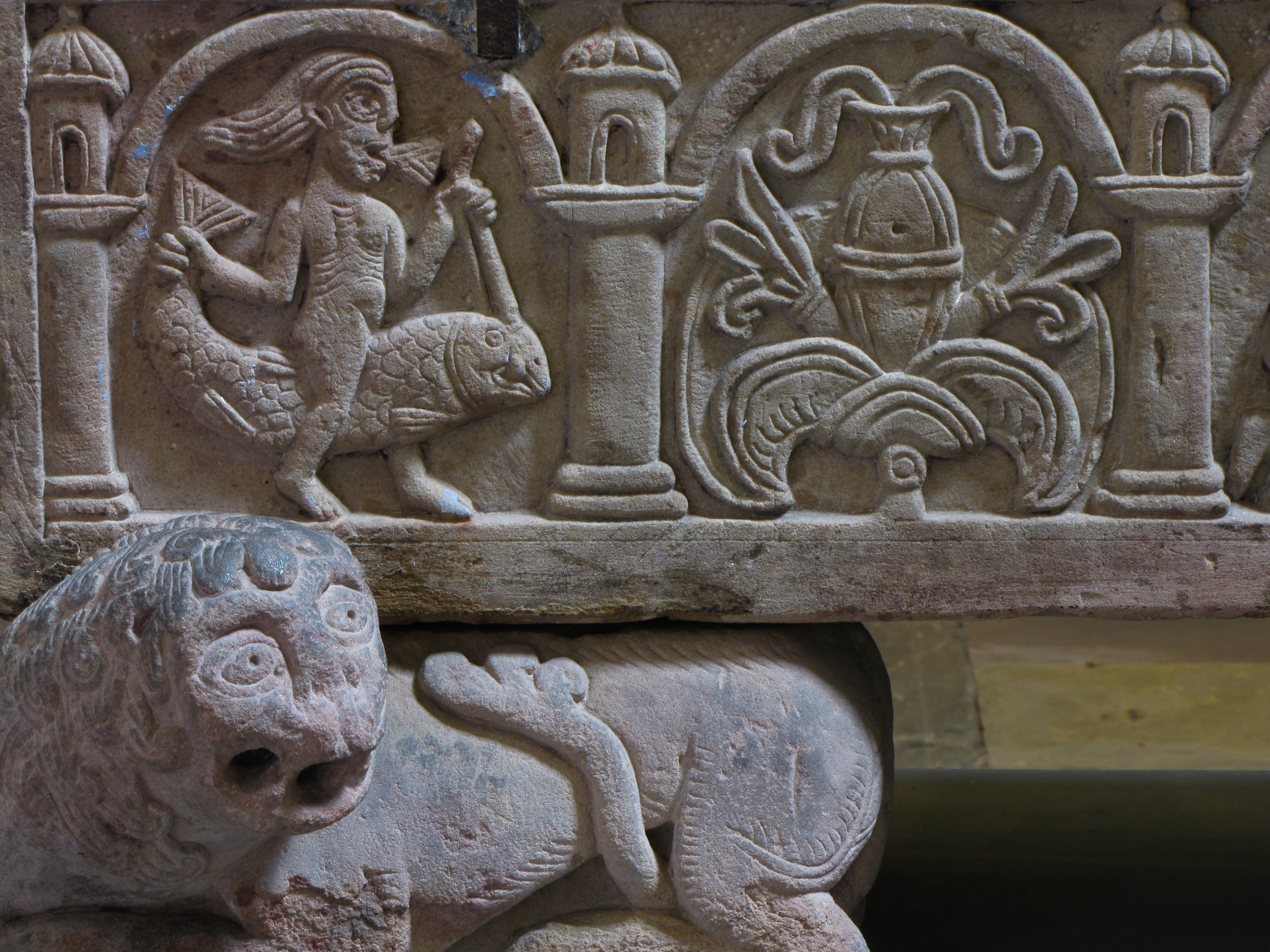
Detail of the sarcophagus

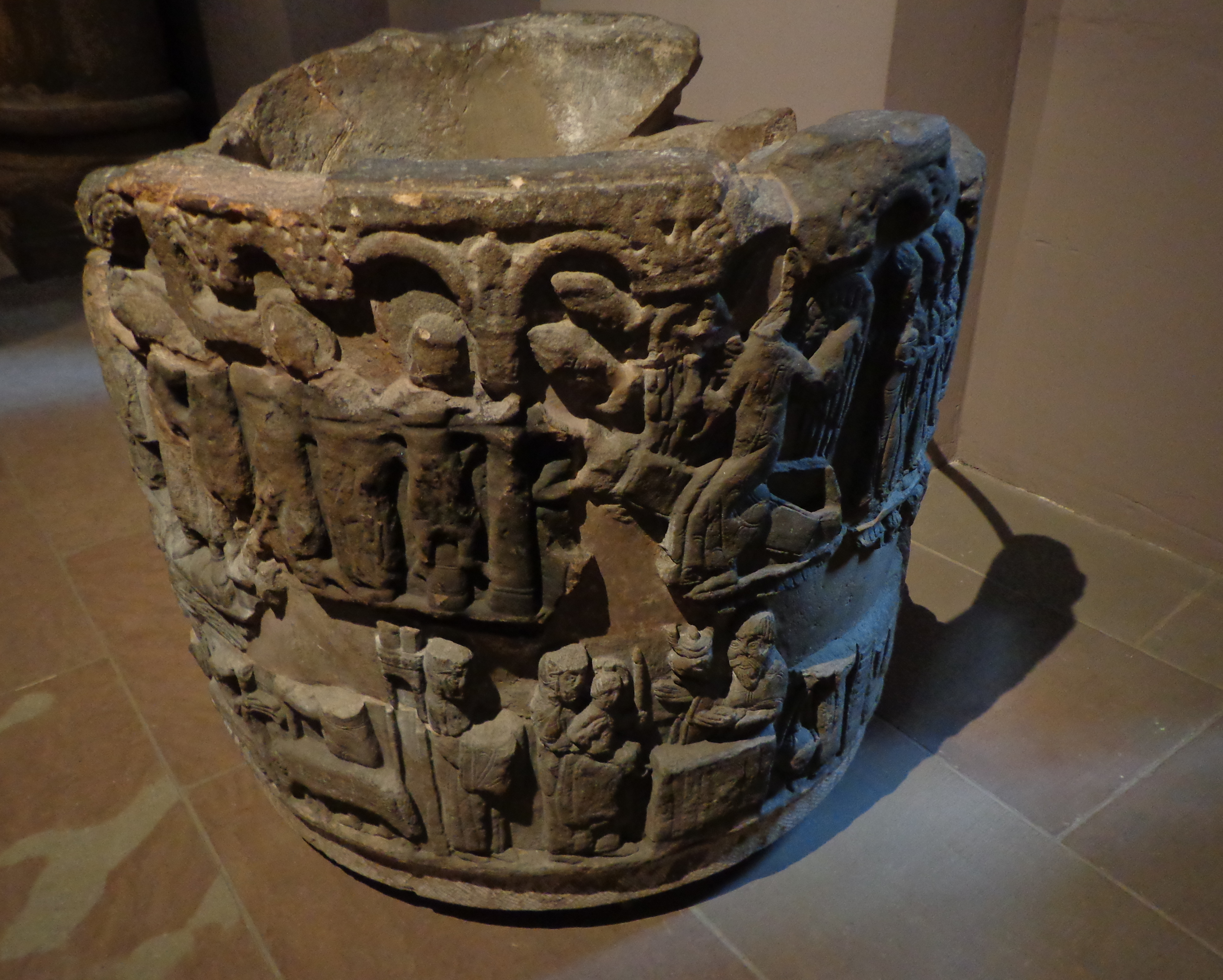
Baptismal font from Eschau

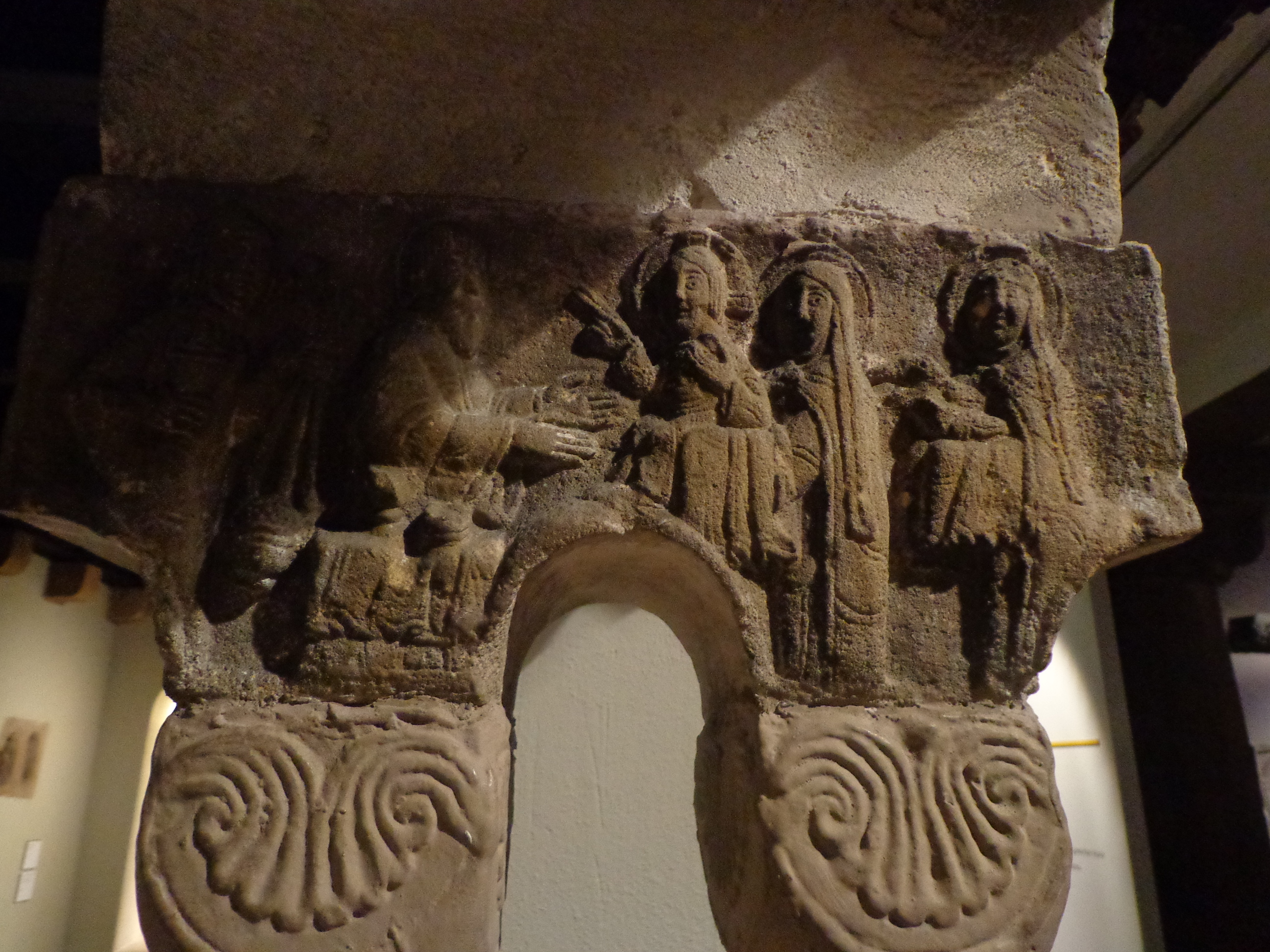
A capital from Eschau

== See also ==
- Master of Andlau
