= St Trophimus' Church, Eschau =

Coordinates: 48°29′25″N 7°42′57″E

Église Saint-Trophime St. Trophimus
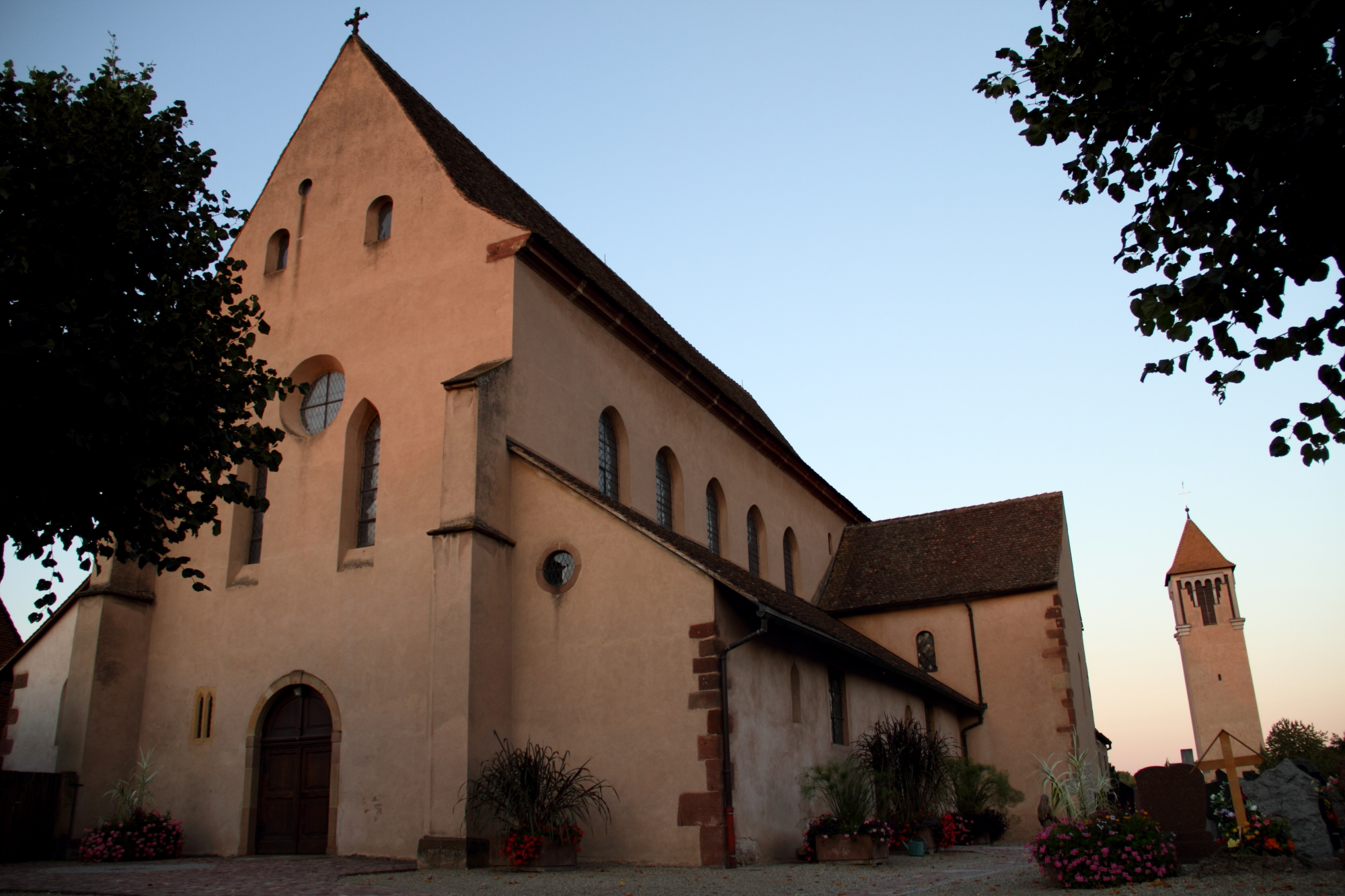
- Église Saint-Trophime; St. Trophimus
- Country: France
- Denomination: Catholic

History
- Founded: 770
- Dedication: Mary; Trophimus of Arles

Architecture
- Heritage designation: Monument historique
- Designated: 1898
- Style: Romanesque
- Completed: early 11th century

Specifications
- Length: 32 m (105 ft) (inside)
- Width: 18 m (59 ft) (inside)
- Height: 12 m (39 ft) (inside)

Administration
- Archdiocese: Strasbourg

Saint Trophimus' Church (French: Église Saint-Trophime) is a Romanesque church in Eschau, a small town in the suburbs of Strasbourg, the historical capital of Alsace. The church is dedicated to Trophimus of Arles.

It houses relics of Saint Sophia (French: Sainte Sophie) since 777 and is a place of Christian pilgrimage, especially for members of the Russian Orthodox Church. It is classified as a Monument historique by the French Ministry of Culture since 1898.

== History ==
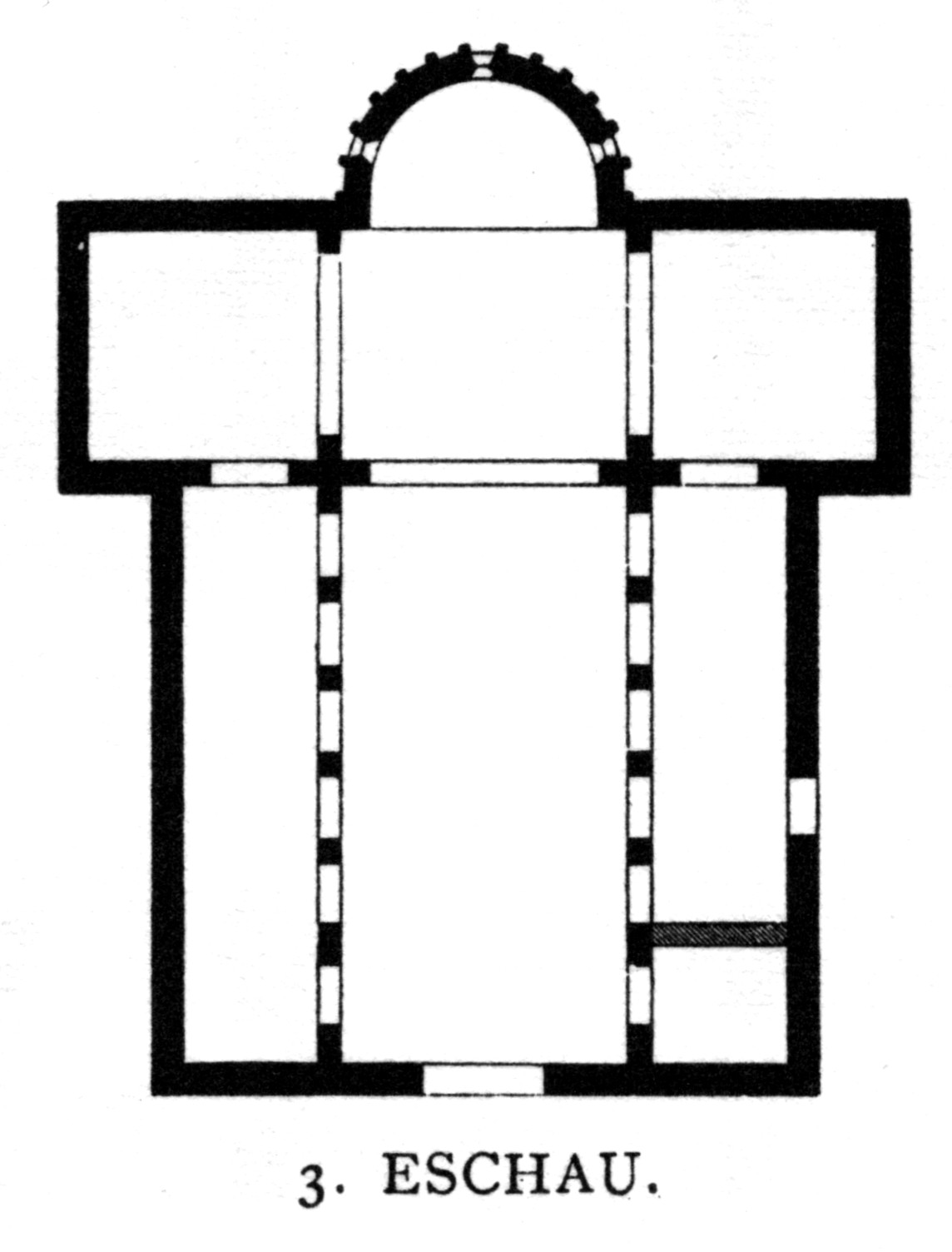
Floor plan of the church (drawn between 1887 and 1901)

The church was originally part of a Benedictine abbey founded by the bishop of Strasbourg, Remigius of Strasbourg in 770. On 10 May 777, Remigius brought relics of Sophia and her daughters from Rome, where they had been given to him by Pope Adrian I. He dedicated the abbey to St Sophia, and the church both to Mary and St Trophimus. Remigius died on 23 March 783 and was buried in the church.

The church was destroyed by the Hungarians in 926. It was rebuilt in 996 by bishop Wilderod. In 1143, the number of pilgrims to the relics was so considerable that abbess Chunegundis (Cunigunde) initiated the construction of a hospital on the ancient Roman road near the abbey. Around that time, an ornate cloister was added, with capitals and other sculptures from the workshop of the Master of Eschau. The church was again damaged in 1298, during a military campaign of Conrad of Lichtenberg against Adolf, King of the Romans, and the Romanesque cloister was destroyed. The façade of the church was rebuilt shortly after. In 1526, bishop Wilhelm von Hohnstein dismantled the abbey as a consequence of Protestant Reform and the German Peasants' War. The buildings remained the property of the Roman Catholic Diocese of Strasbourg, until Leopold V, Archduke of Austria sold them to the Grand Chapter of Strasbourg Cathedral for 20,942 guilder in 1615. The Grand Chapter used the residential buildings of the abbey as a winery.

During the Thirty Years' War, the church was pillaged in 1632 by the Swedish troops under General Horn. In 1792, the buildings were confiscated by French Revolutionaries and the church was turned into an inn. The relics of Sophia and her daughters were dispersed. In 1822, all the buildings except the church were demolished. The church became the parish church of Eschau. Remains of the 12th-century cloister were found thanks to archaeological excavations in 1866, 1917, 1919 and 1929, and are shown in the Musée de l’Œuvre Notre-Dame in Strasbourg; some more fragments were found in 1987 and are kept in the town hall of Eschau.

In the 1930s, a tradition of Russian Orthodox pilgrimage to the church was established, notably by the visit of archimandrite Andronik in 1937. The following year, 1938, bishop Charles Ruch brought "new" relics of St Sophia from Rome, which had been authenticated by Cardinal Francesco Marchetti Selvaggiani.

During World War II, the church was damaged again, in 1944−45. It was thoroughly restored from 1958 until 1969. A new bell tower was built in 1987, 80 m (260 ft) behind the church. The installation of underfloor heating in 1995 brought other lost fragments to light, among them two sarcophagi.

== Description ==
The church is of modest dimensions. Its present layout and volumes are reminiscent of the abbey church of Reichenau, and of St. Godehard, Hildesheim. Some of the features of the church have been much altered since its completion in the 11th century: the floor of the nave was originally some 1.25 m (4 ft 1 in) lower and the windows of the nave were much smaller. Conversely, other features, like the apse, have remained unchanged for 1,000 years. The inside displays several Gothic and Baroque statues of saints as well as Renaissance sculptures such as a head of John the Baptist on a platter, and ledger stones from the 16th, 17th and 18th centuries. The choir window reuses a Gothic stained glass panel originally from the former Dominican church of Strasbourg, destroyed in 1870.

== Gallery ==
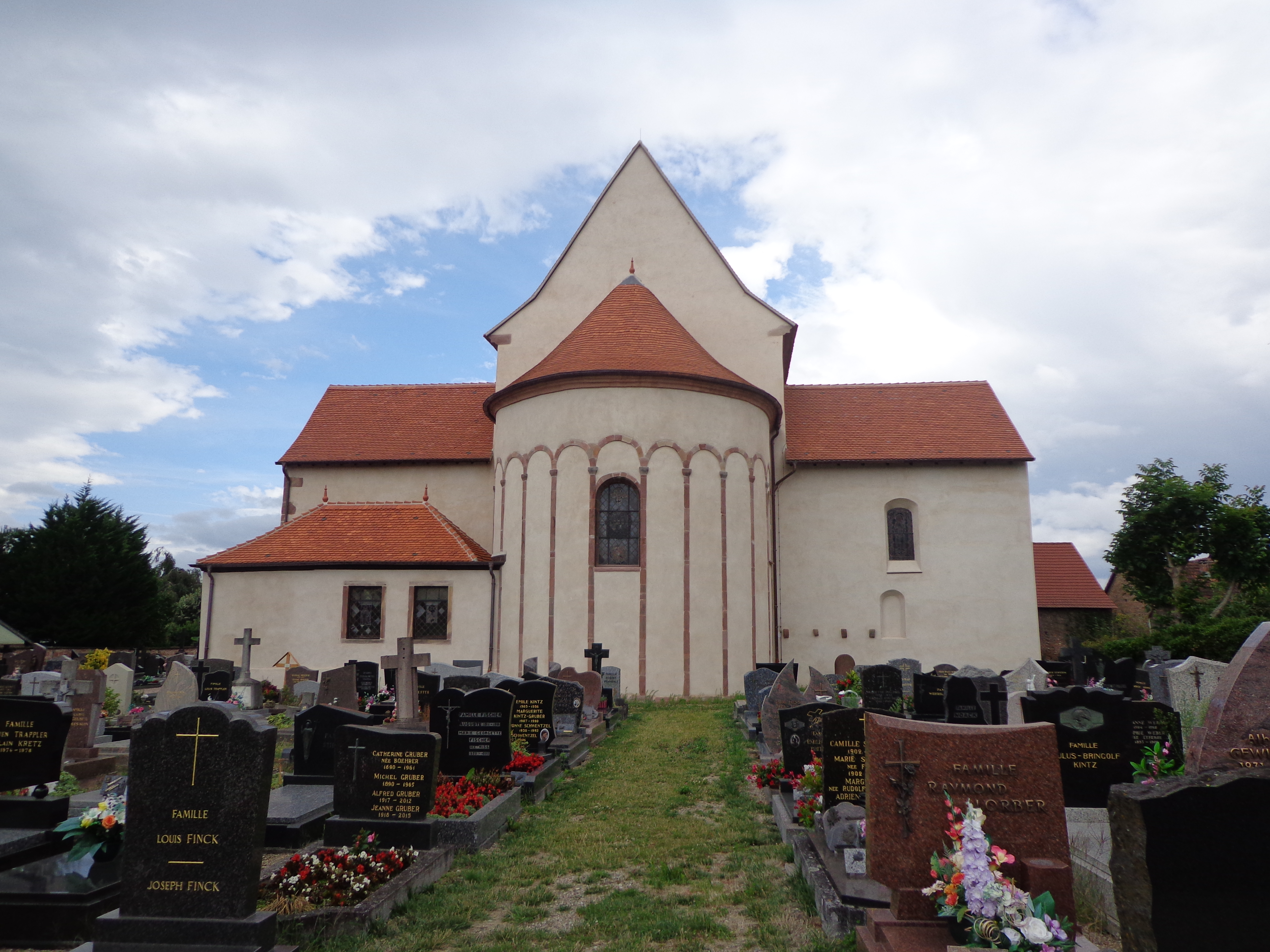
The apse

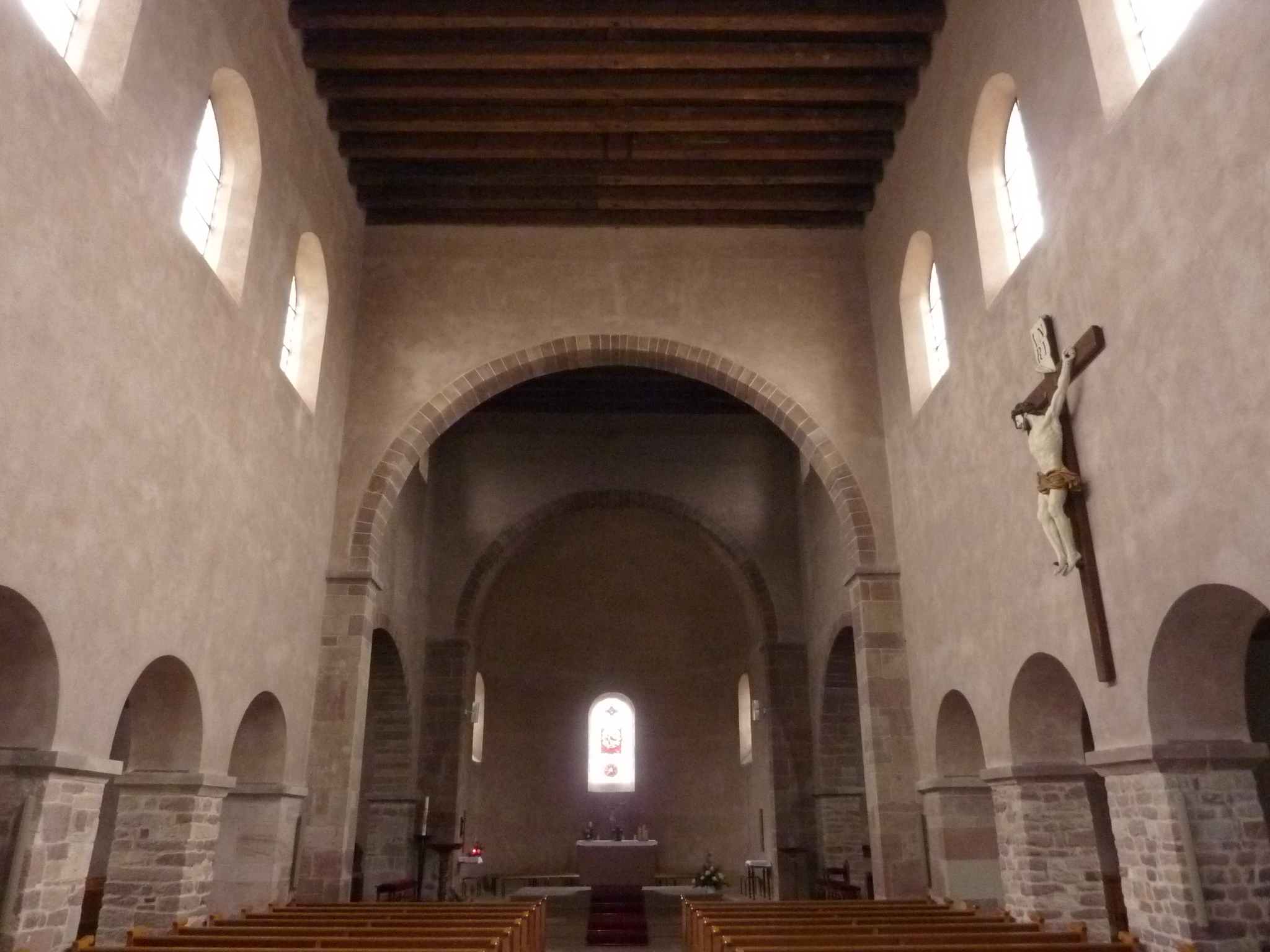
Central nave, looking to the choir

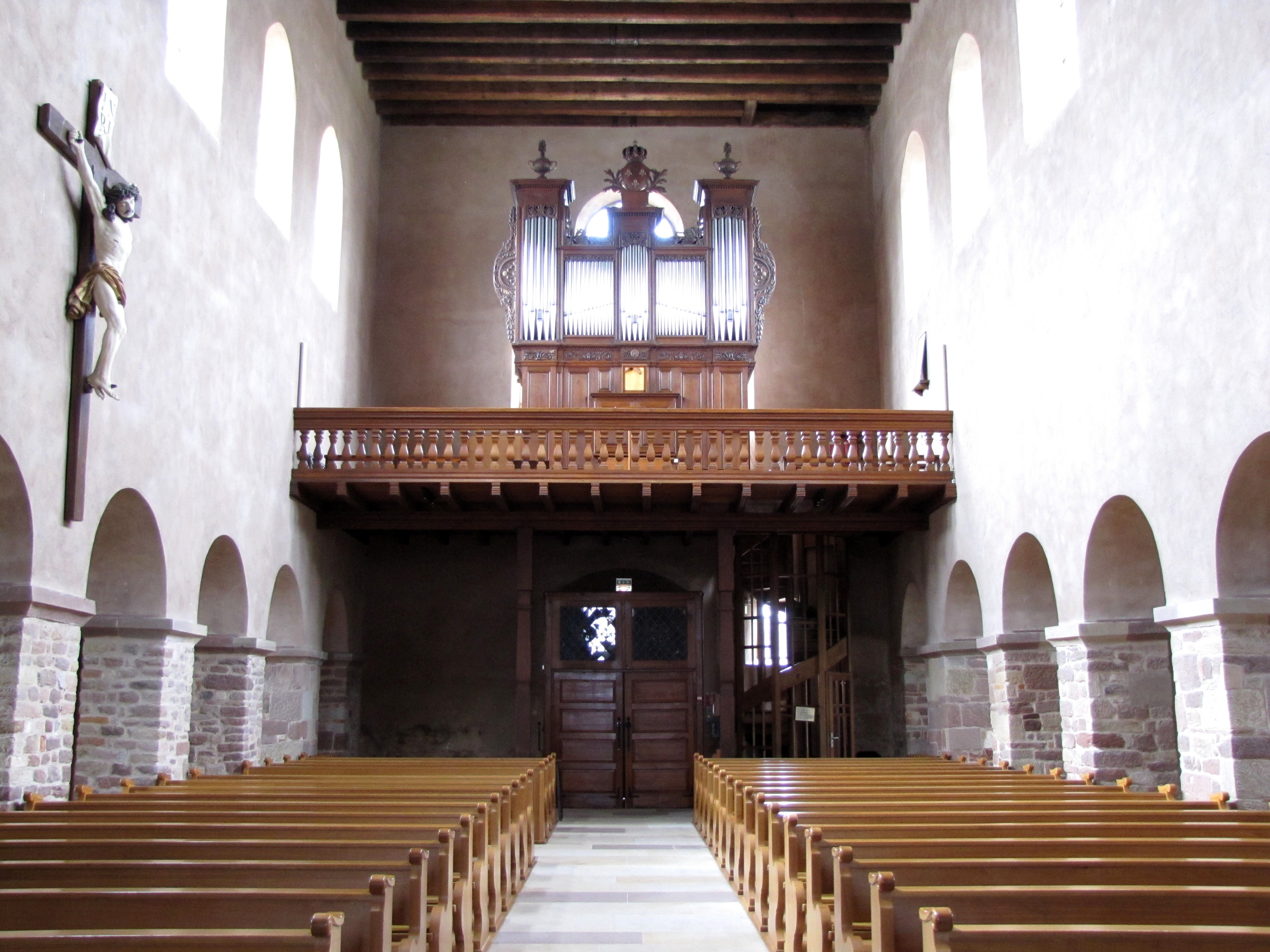
Central nave, looking to the entrance

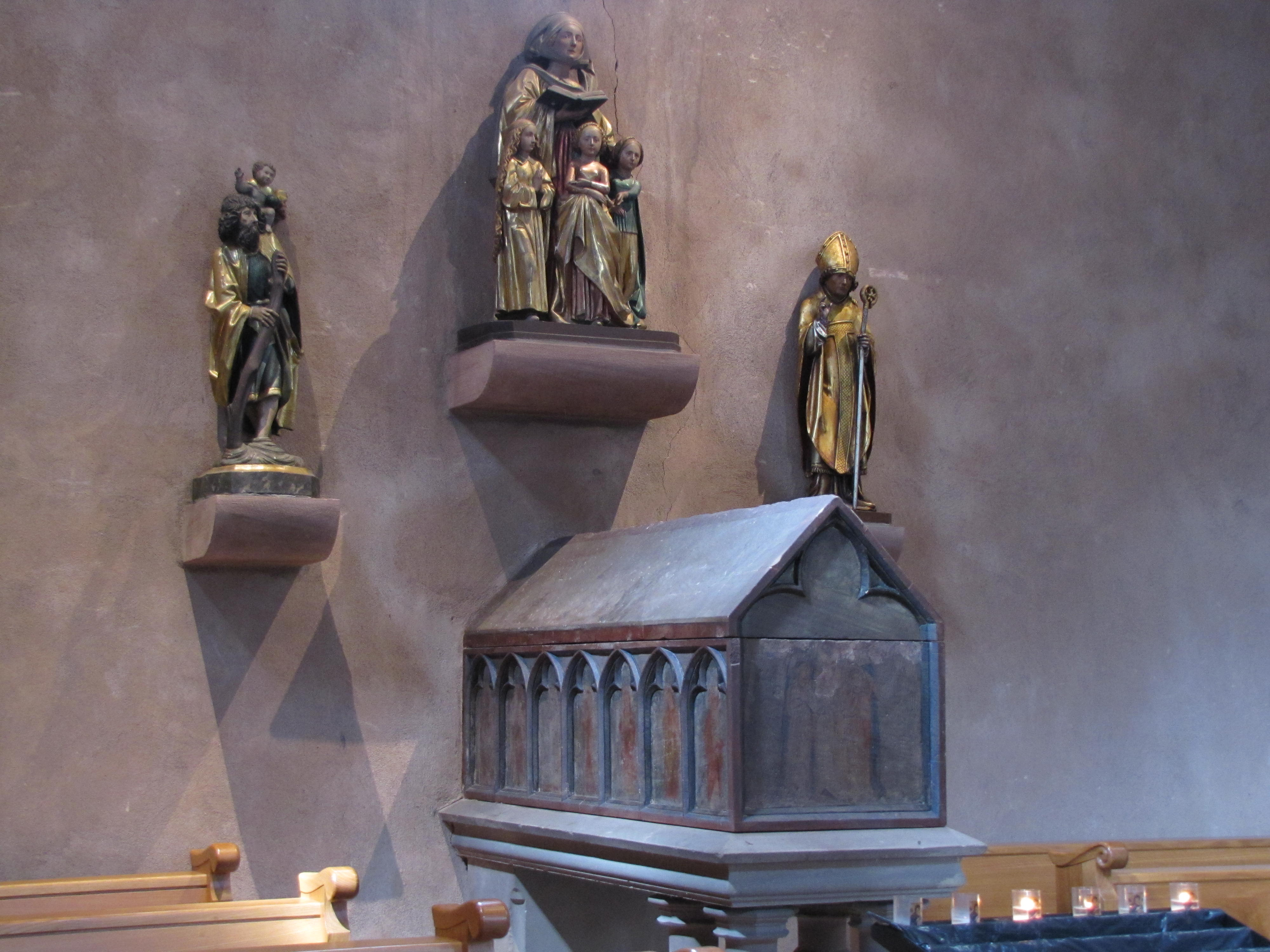
Chasse and statue of Saint Sophia and her daughters

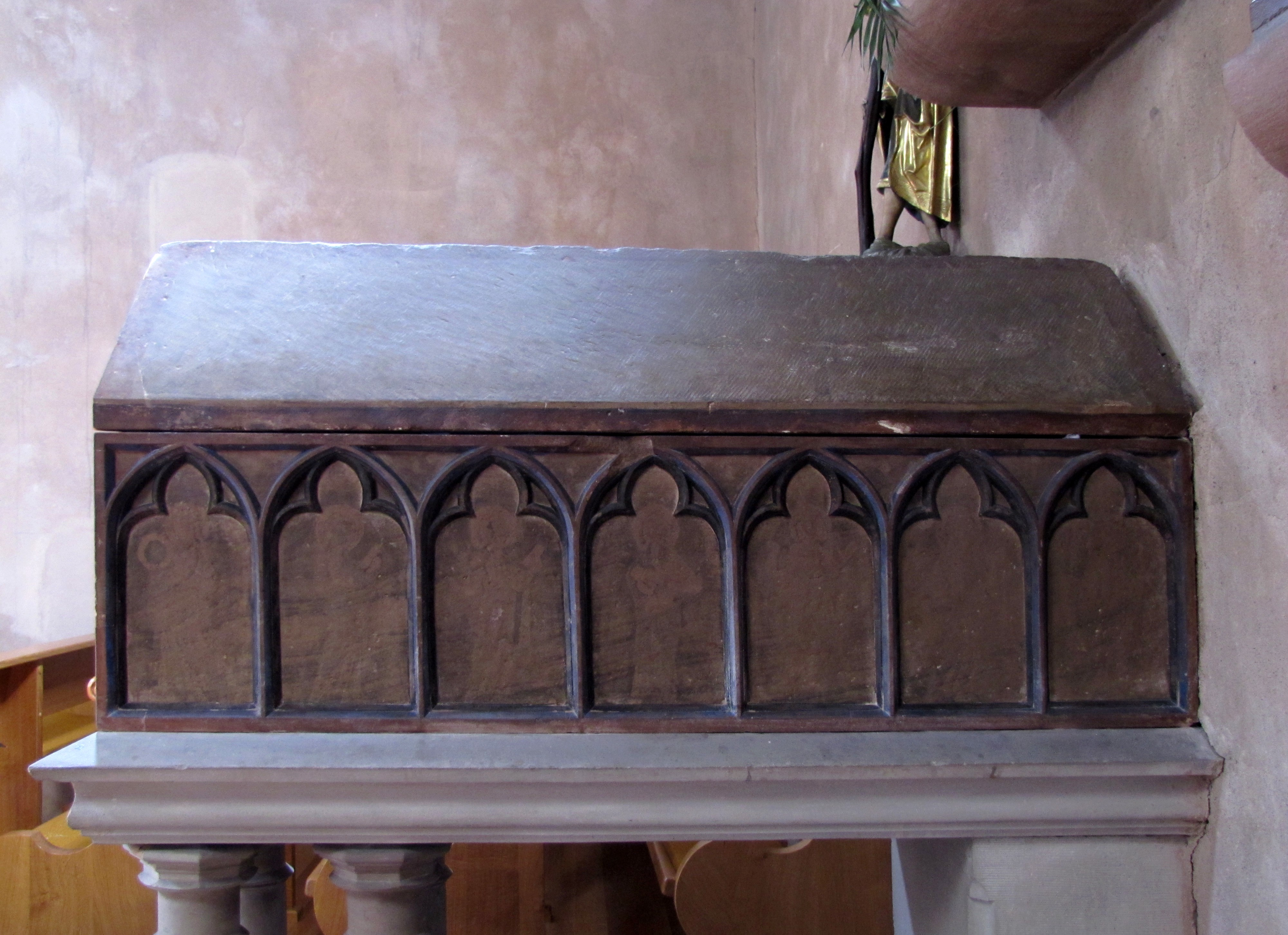
Chasse of Saint Sophia (14th century)

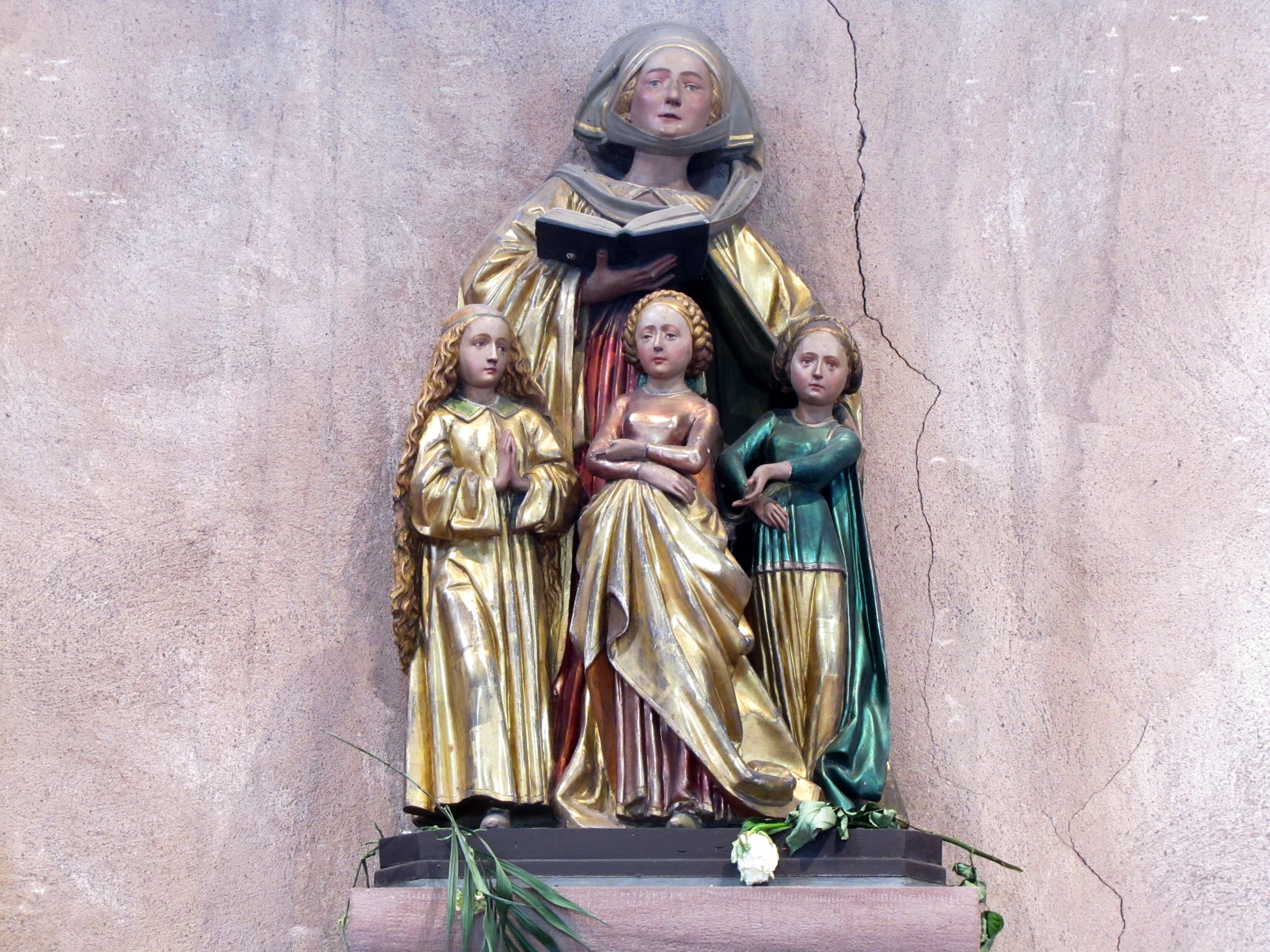
Statue of Saint Sophia and her daughters (ca. 1470)

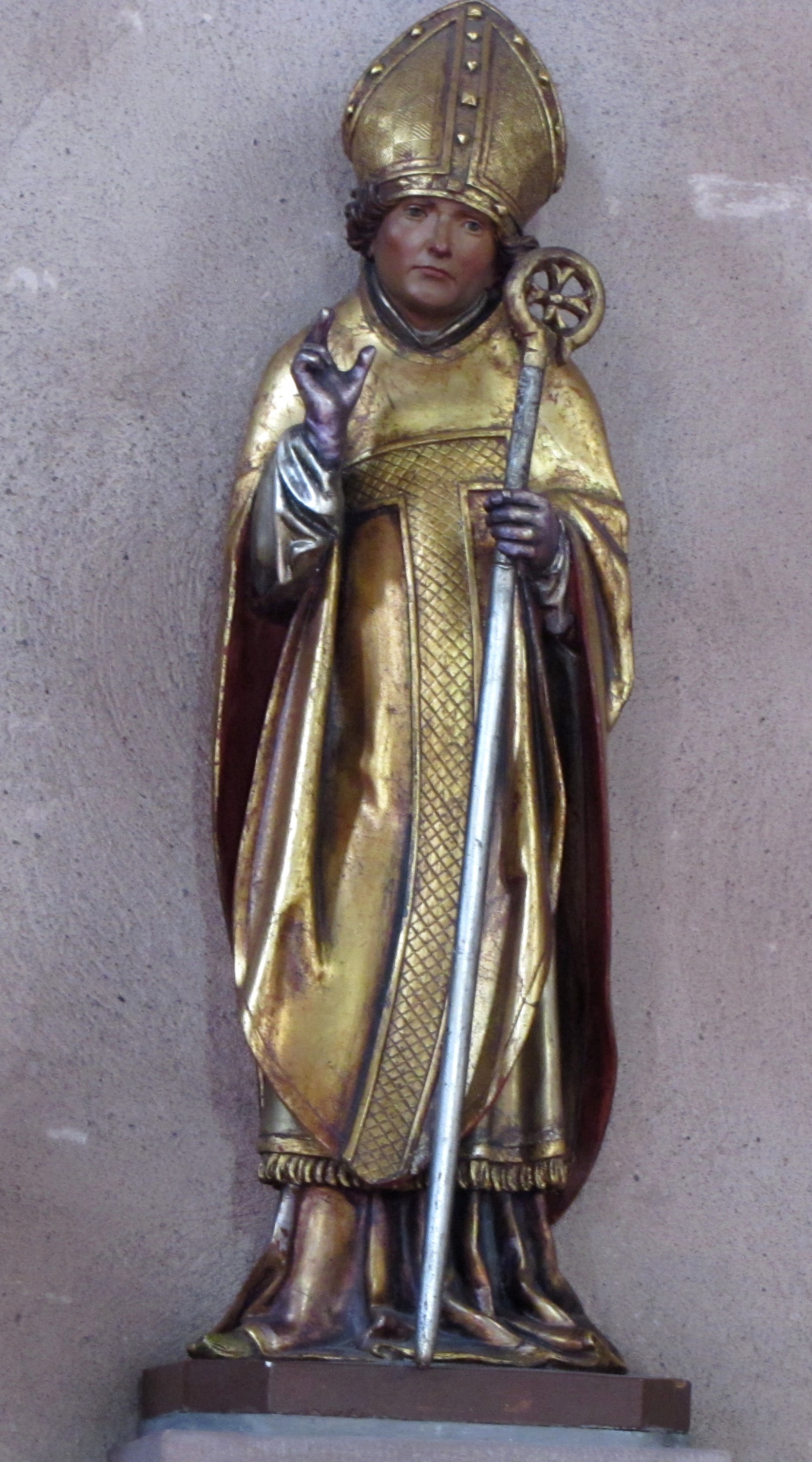
Statue of Saint Remigius (ca. 1480)

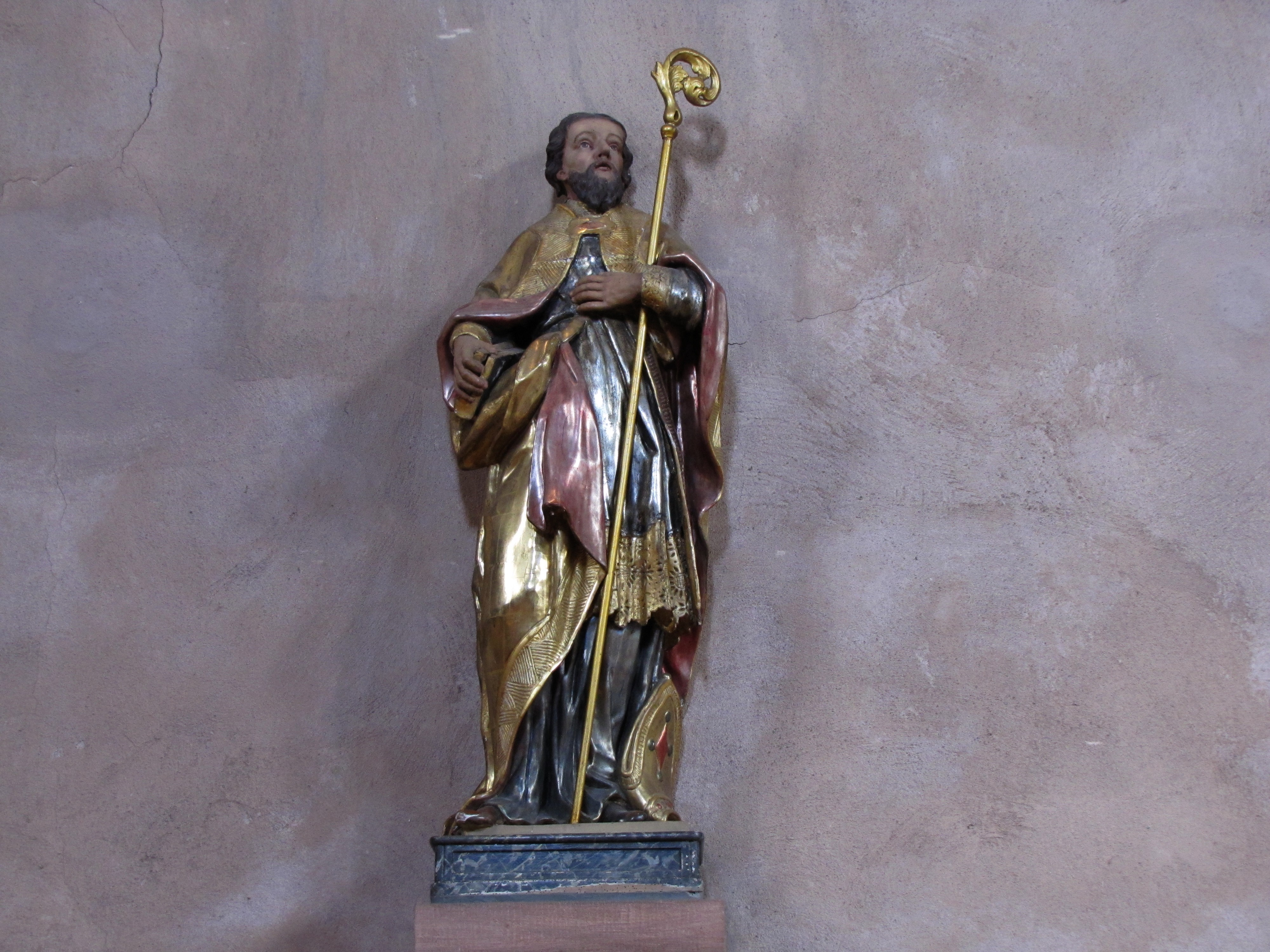
Statue of Saint Trophimus (18th century)

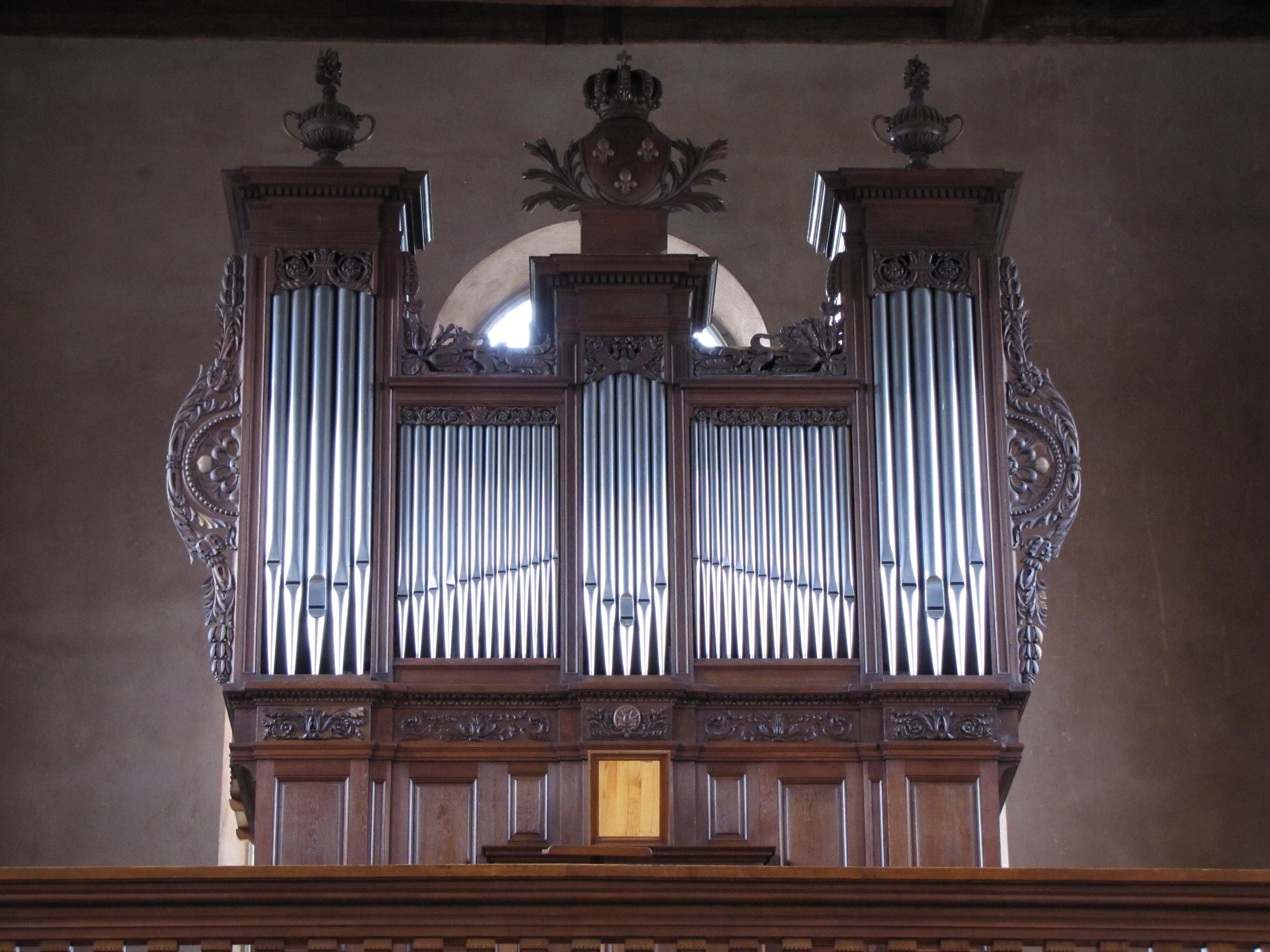
Pipe organ (1817)

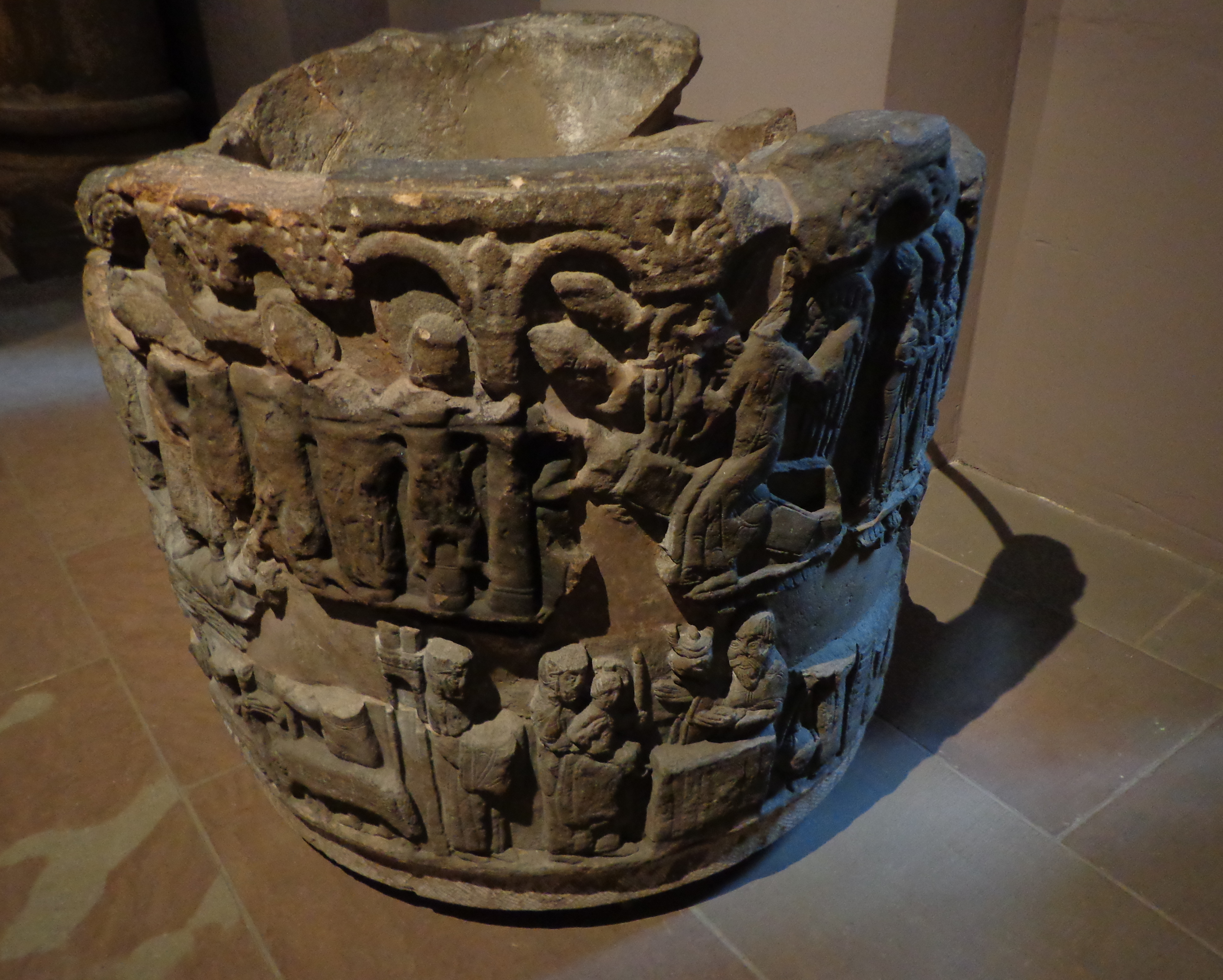
Baptismal font (11th-century) in the Musée de l’Œuvre Notre-Dame
