= Algot (name) =

- Gender: Male
- Language: Old Norse
- Name day: 30 July (Sweden)

Origin
- Region of origin: Scandinavia

Other names
- Variant forms: Algott; Allgott
- Cognate: Algautr

Algot is a masculine given name and has variants of Algott, Allgott and Algoth. It is a derivative of Old Norse word Algautr and is a compound word consisting of al "elf" or "all" and gautr "man from Götaland."

Notable people with the name include:

== Given name ==
- Algot Christoffersson, Swedish football player
- Algot Haglund (1905–1963), Swedish football player
- Algot Haquinius (1886–1966), Swedish pianist and composer
- Algot Lange (1884–?), Swedish explorer
- Algot Larsson (1889–1967), Swedish athlete
- Algot Lönn (1887–1953), Swedish road racing cyclist
- Algot Magnuson of Revsnes (c.1355–c.1426), Swedish magnate, and castellan of Styresholm
- Algot Malmberg (1903–1971), Swedish wrestler
- Algot Nilsson, Swedish bandy player
- Algoth Niska (1888–1954), Finnish bootlegger and adventurer
- Algot Tergel (1906–1996), Swedish priest, teacher and author
- Algot Törneman (1909–1993), Swedish enamel artist and painter
- Algot Untola (1868–1918), Finnish writer and journalist

=== Middle name ===
- Erik Algot Fredriksson (1885–1930), Swedish tug of war competitor
