= Ulf Dextegen =

Swedish hypnotherapist and freediver

Personal information
- Born: 16 November 1960 (age 65)

Sport
- Sport: Diving

Ulf Dextegen (born 16 November 1960) is a Swedish hypnotherapist and champion freediver (national records in 2008, 2009, 2011, 2012, 2013 with 8 minutes 43 seconds in static apnea, and bronze medals in 2009 and 2011 world championships. Personal best in training: 9 minutes 11 seconds).

Dextegen is known for experimenting with altered states of consciousness through hypnosis and self-hypnosis. After an episode of being successfully treated from stress, he became interested in hypnosis in 2006. Completing initial training courses in hypnosis and freediving, Dextegen used static apnea to check the efficiency of the altered state of consciousness in education and sports. Despite being a 40+ years old office worker with an average lung capacity, he made the experience even more challenging by excluding any special diet or excessive lifestyle restrictions and exercises. In two years of practicing a combination of static apnea and self-hypnosis, Dextegen went from beginner to national champion and second in the world ranking in static apnea (years 2008–2009).

After retiring from competition in 2013, Ulf Dextegen naturally went on helping other athletes in many different sports, amateurs and professionals. He uses himself as example of how powerful mind-training could be: "though I wasn't sure to succeeded in sport, the self-experiment went out better than I could imagine".
