= Stellan =

Stellan is a masculine given name used in Sweden. It means “peaceful one” or “calm” and has a German origin. Although many think it is equivalent to Stelio used in Italy, Stelian used in Romania and Stelios in Greece, all serving as masculine versions of the feminine name Stela which means star in Latin language, it is not proven.

== People ==
- Stellan Bengtsson (born 1952), Swedish table tennis player
- Stellan Bojerud (1944–2015), Swedish politician
- Stellan Brynell (born 1962), Swedish chess player
- Stellan Claësson (1886–1970), Swedish film producer
- Stellan Fagrell (1943–2022), Swedish officer
- Stellan Hjerpset-Østlie (born 2001), Norwegian politician
- Stellan Nilsson (1922–2003), Swedish football player
- Stellan Olsson (1936–2022), Swedish film director
- Stellan Österberg (born 1965), Swedish badminton player
- Stellan Rye (1880–1914), Danish film director
- Stellan Skarsgård (born 1951), Swedish actor
- Stellan Vinthagen (born 1964), Swedish sociologist
- Stellan Westerdahl (1935–2018), Swedish sailor

== See also ==
- Stella (given name)
