= Algot Christoffersson =

Swedish footballer

Personal information
- Full name: Algot Christoffersson
- Position: Defender

Senior career*
Years	Team	Apps	(Gls)
1923–1933	Malmö FF	150	(5)
- * Club domestic league appearances and goals

Algot Christoffersson was a Swedish footballer who played as a defender. He played 150 matches and scored five goals for Malmö FF from 1923 to 1933.
