= Jan Hamrin =

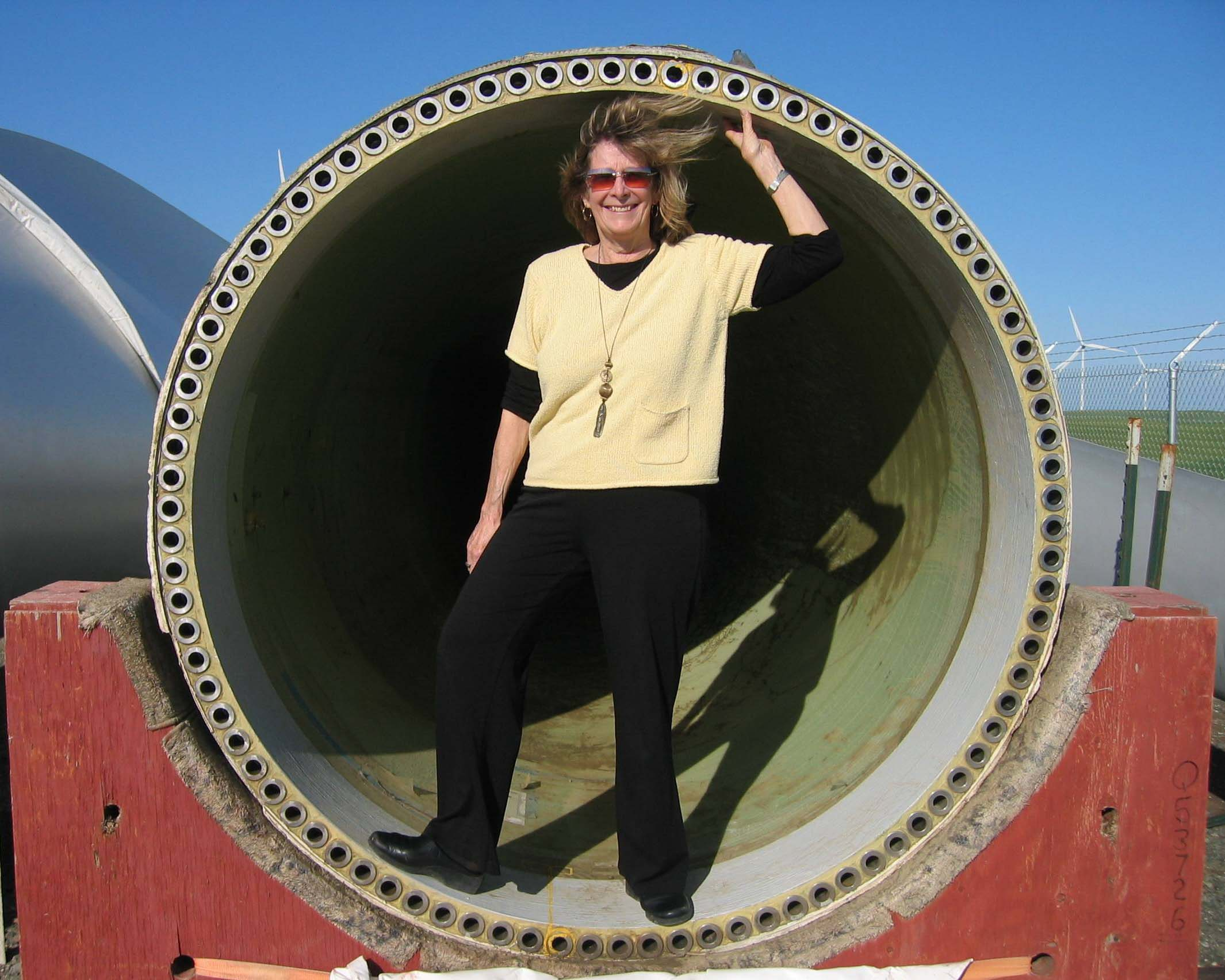
Jan Hamrin

Jan Hamrin has served as advisor to the G-8 and numerous legislatures and regulatory commissions as well as co-authoring two books: Affected with the Public Interest: Electric Industry Restructuring in an Era of Competition (1994) and Investing in the Future: A Regulator’s Guide to Renewables (1993). In 1981 Hamrin founded and served for nine years as Executive Director of the Independent Energy Producers’ Association (IEP) in California and played a key role in the implementation of the Public Utilities Regulatory Policies Act (PURPA) in California and elsewhere.

Jan Hamrin received her Ph.D. in Ecology, with emphasis on public policy evaluation of environmental and energy programs, from the University of California, Davis. She also holds master's degrees in Public Administration from U.C. Davis as well as a B.S. from the University of New Mexico.
