= Ylva =

- Gender: Female
- Language: Swedish, Norwegian
- Name day: April 11 (Sweden, Norway); September 13 (Finland (Swedish language))

Other gender
- Masculine: Ulf

Origin
- Language: Swedish
- Meaning: she-wolf

Ylva is a Swedish female given name meaning "she-wolf". It is the feminine form of the masculine given name Ulf. The name is also used in Norway.

== Notable bearers ==
- Ingrid Ylva (c. 1180s–1250s), Swedish noblewoman
- Ylva Eggehorn (born 1950), Swedish poet and writer
- Ylva Ivarsson (born 1964), Swedish archer
- Ylva Johansson (born 1964), Swedish politician
- Ylva Lindberg (born 1976), Swedish ice hockey player
- Ylva Lööf (born 1958), Swedish actress
- Ylva Nowén (born 1970), Swedish former alpine skier
- Ylva Stadell (born 1982), Swedish politician
- Ylva Thörn (born 1954), Swedish politician and former trade unionist

== In fiction ==
- Ylva, mother of Vicke Viking
- Ylva Haraldsdotter is a character in The Long Ships (original Swedish: Röde Orm) by Frans Gunnar Bengtsson
- A character in Vinland Saga by Makoto Yukimura
- In the American movie Alex and Emma, Alex (a novelist) and Emma (his paid stenographer) get into an argument about whether Ylva (a character in his story) is a real name or not (which sends some American viewers to the internet to see whether it really is a name).
