= Ulf Hamrin =

Swedish writer and copywriter

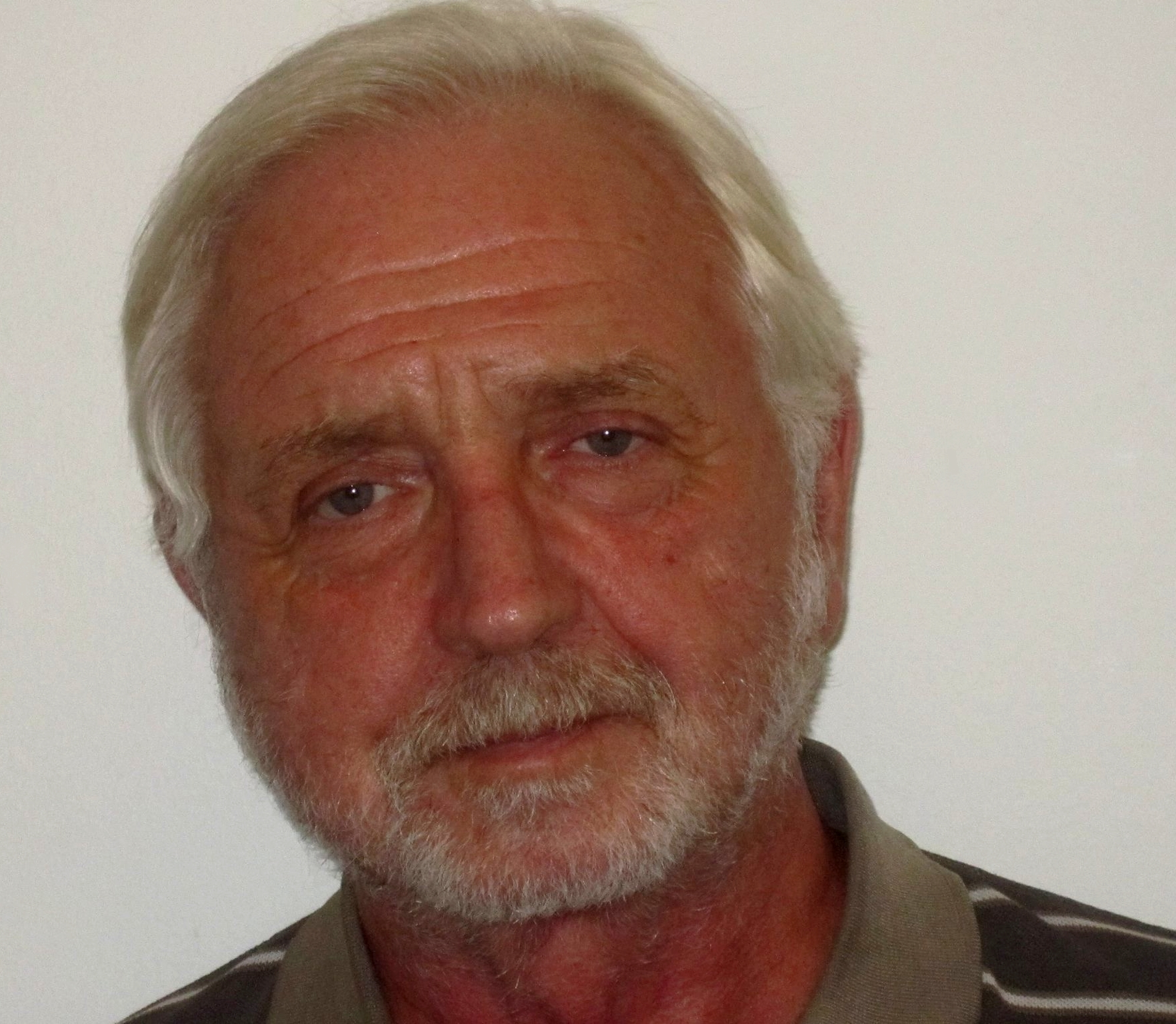
- Ulf Hamrin 2015.
- Born: Ulf Owe Christer Hamrin; 11 June 1946 (age 80); Östersund, Sweden
- Citizenship: Örnsköldsvik
- Occupations: Writer and copywriter
- Spouse(s): Karin Hamrin (born Ejner), 1975-
- Children: 2
- Writing career
- Language: Swedish
- Years active: 1965–
- Website: www.ulfhamrinab.com

Ulf Hamrin, born on 11 June 1946 in Östersund, Sweden is a Swedish writer and copywriter.

== Bibliography ==
- Energi är livet! co-writer Tommy Ericsson (1991)
- Nyfiken på energi co-writer Hans-Uno Bengtsson (2000)
- Nätchocken (2001)
- Smakbitar: mat och musik från Jämtland och Härjedalen (2002)
- Tankar om döden illustrated by Lars-Erik Håkansson – Lehån (2002)
- Tankar om livet illustrated by Lars-Erik Håkansson – Lehån (2003)
- Tankar om tiden illustrated by Lars-Erik Håkansson (2003)
- Drömfabriken (2006)
- Jämtland, Härjedalen: ett sätt att leva co-writer Claes Ahlström and Jenny Isaksson (2010)
- Bilden, first part of the trilogy ”Jag finns inte” Visto förlag (2015)
