= Sophia of Rome =

Roman martyr

Saint Sophia of Rome
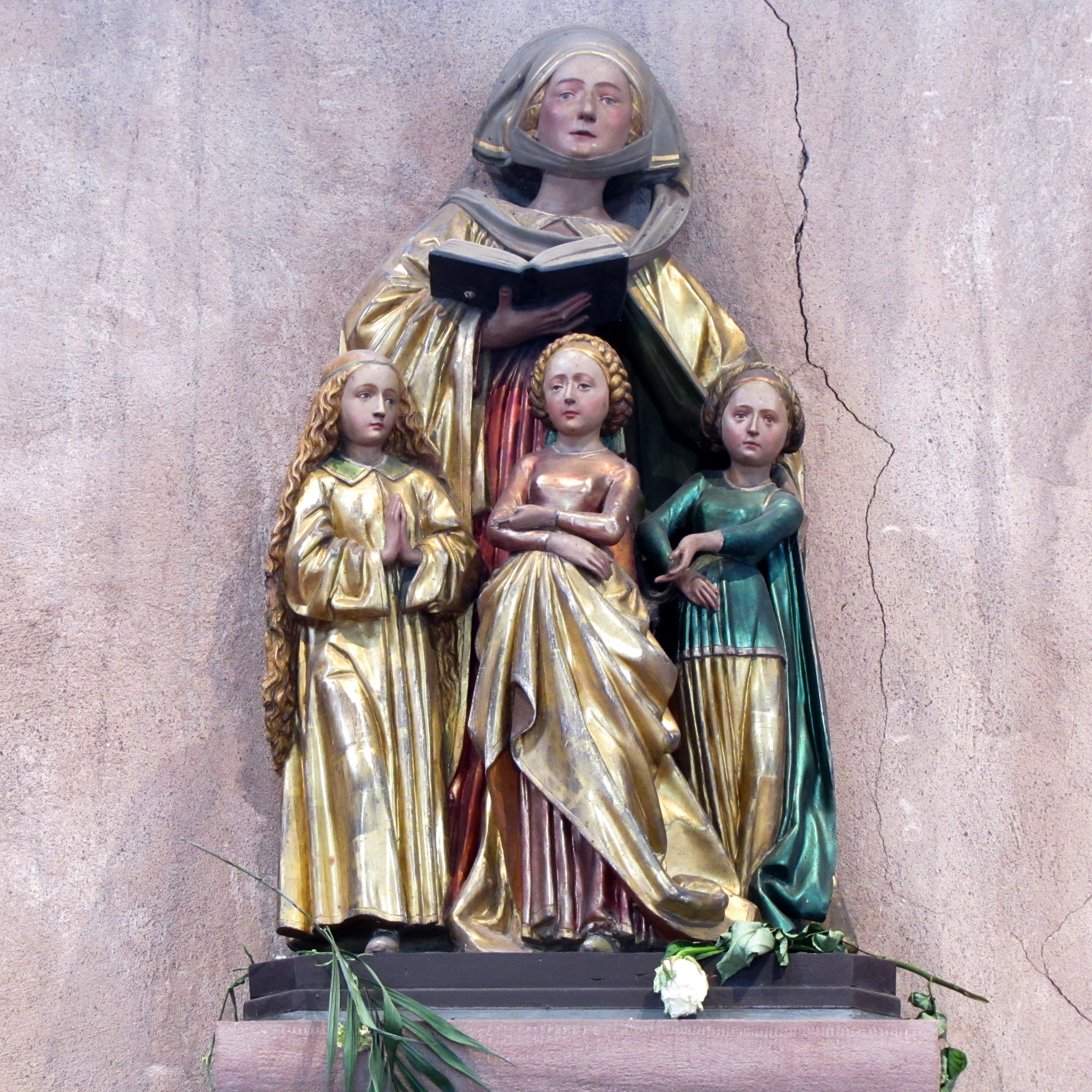
- Late gothic wooden sculpture of saints Sophia, Faith, Hope and Charity (Eschau, 1470)
- Born: Unknown
- Died: 304 AD; Rome
- Venerated in: Roman Catholic Church; Eastern Orthodox Church
- Feast: May 15 (Catholic; in Germany, celebrated as Sophientag) September 17 (Orthodox)
- Attributes: palm, book, trough, and sword
- Patronage: invoked against late frosts

Saint Sophia of Rome was an early Christian martyr venerated by many churches. She is identified in hagiographical tradition with the figure of Sophia of Milan, the mother of Saints Faith, Hope and Charity (Ancient Greek: Pistis, Elpis and Agape, Latin: Fides, Spes, and Caritas), whose veneration is attested for the sixth century.

The widespread hagiographical tradition (BHL 2966, also extant in Greek, Armenian and Georgian versions) places Sophia, the mother of Faith, Hope, and Charity, in the time of Hadrian (second century) and reports her dying by mourning for her martyred daughters. Furthermore, it is not only debated which hagiographical tradition is correct, but also whether this is based on a real story or on unreliable texts which created a myth that mirrored religious thought at the time. Her relics are said to have been translated to the convent at Eschau, Alsace in 778, and her cult spread to Germany from there. Acta Sanctorum reports that her feast day of 15 May is attested in German, Belgian, and English breviaries of the 16th century.

Roman Catholic hagiography of the early modern period attempted to identify Saint Sophia venerated in Germany with various records of martyrs named Sophia recorded in the early medieval period. Among them is a record from the time of Pope Sergius II (9th century) reporting an inscription mentioning a virgin martyr named Sophia at the high altar of the church of San Martino ai Monti. Saxer (2000) suggests that her veneration may indeed have originated in the later sixth century based on such inscriptions of the fourth to sixth centuries.

Based on her feast day on 15 May, Sophia became one of the "Ice Saints", the saints whose feast days are traditionally associated with the last possibility of frost in Central Europe. She is known as kalte Sophie "cold Sophia" in Germany, and in Slovenia as poscana Zofka "pissy Sophia" or mokra Zofija "wet Sophia".

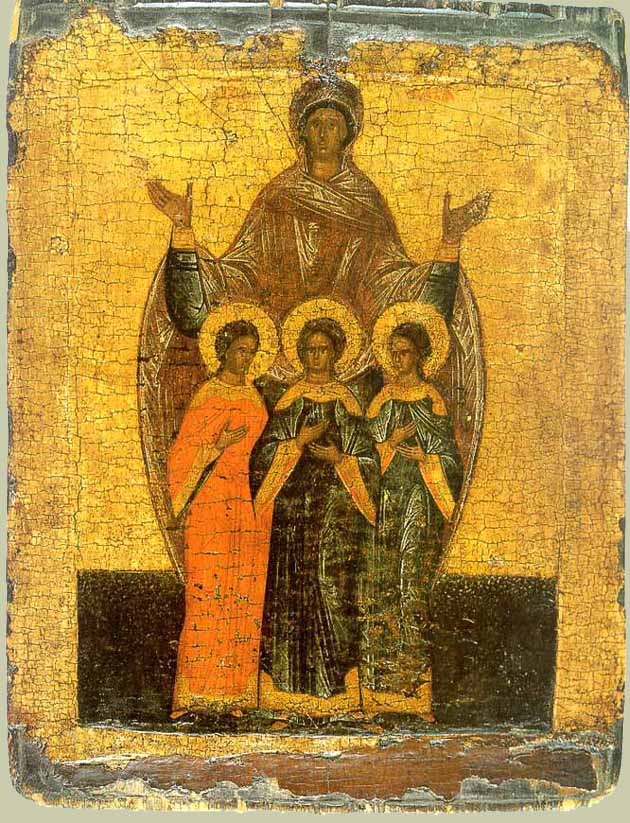
Russian iconography of Sophia the Martyr with three daughters: Faith, Hope, and Charity, which dates back to the 16th century.

Sophia is depicted on a column in the nave of St. Stephen's Cathedral, Vienna; it dates from the 15th century.

== Hagiographical traditions ==
The best-attested narrative is usually dated to between the 7th and 8th centuries but is set in the reign of the pagan Emperor Hadrian (117-138). In this version, Sophia is a pious widow in Rome who raises her three daughters, Pistis (Faith), Elpis (Hope) and Agape (Charity), in the Christian faith. Summoned before Hadrian due to their religious beliefs, the girls are interrogated and tortured. Faith, age twelve, is whipped, burned, and then beheaded. Hope, age ten, and Charity, age nine, are thrown into a furnace and then beheaded as well. Their mother is forced to watch their torture and deaths, yet encourages them to stay true to their Christian beliefs even in their suffering. Sophia herself is not tortured or executed; instead, she takes the bodies of her daughters, buries them, and remains praying at their tomb until she wishes to die three days later because of her grief. She is then buried in the same grave as her daughters, on the Aurelian Way. This tradition emphasizes Sophia’s role as a mother whose mourning creates a spiritual martyrdom, even though she does not die by judicial execution.

Another version of the story says that Sophia was also executed after her daughters and buried on the Appian Way. This story often uses their Latin names: Sapientia, Fides, Spes, and Caritas; according to Roman Martyrology. There are multiple tombs dedicated to Sophia and her three daughters. Though it is debated, their story is often referred to as a myth or a legend that came to be due to the Christian belief that "Faith, Hope, and Charity are the fruit or offspring of Wisdom."

== Modern scholarship ==
Modern scholarship has examined the role of motherhood in the story of Sophia and her daughters. Researcher Christodoulos Papavarnavas, who studies Byzantine literature, points out that the depiction of Sophia as the mother of three martyrs follows patterns commonly found in Byzantine hagiography, where maternal figures are often used to highlight themes of faith, endurance, and moral instruction.

Studies of motherhood in martyrdom narratives also note that elements such as childbirth and parental grief frequently appear in symbolic forms. Motherhood is presented as a prerequisite for holiness, as it is the very act of nurturing, enduring pain, and then ultimately being separated from one's children, which becomes part of the martyr's spiritual journey. These features are understood as part of the literary conventions of the genre rather than as reliable historical details.

In this context, scholars treat the maternal aspects of Sophia's story as one example within a broader tradition. Their focus is generally on how her role functions within the narrative framework of Byzantine martyr literature, rather than on determining whether the accounts reflect historical events.

== Holy Wisdom ==
There is a long-standing tendency to conflate Saint Sophia with Hagia Sophia (“Holy Wisdom”), the divine Wisdom of God. Liturgical tradition sometimes link the virtues of faith, hope and charity with Wisdom, and the daughters’ names themselves derive from Saint Paul's First Letter to the Corinthians (1 Cor. 13). Later writers and church dedications sometimes treat Sophia as an embodiment of divine Wisdom, while others distinguish the historical (or legendary) martyr from the abstract theological concept. They are not the same thing, and many churches thought to be named after Saint Sophia are actually named after the concept of the Hagia Sophia instead.

== Churches ==
- Saint Sophia Church, Sofia

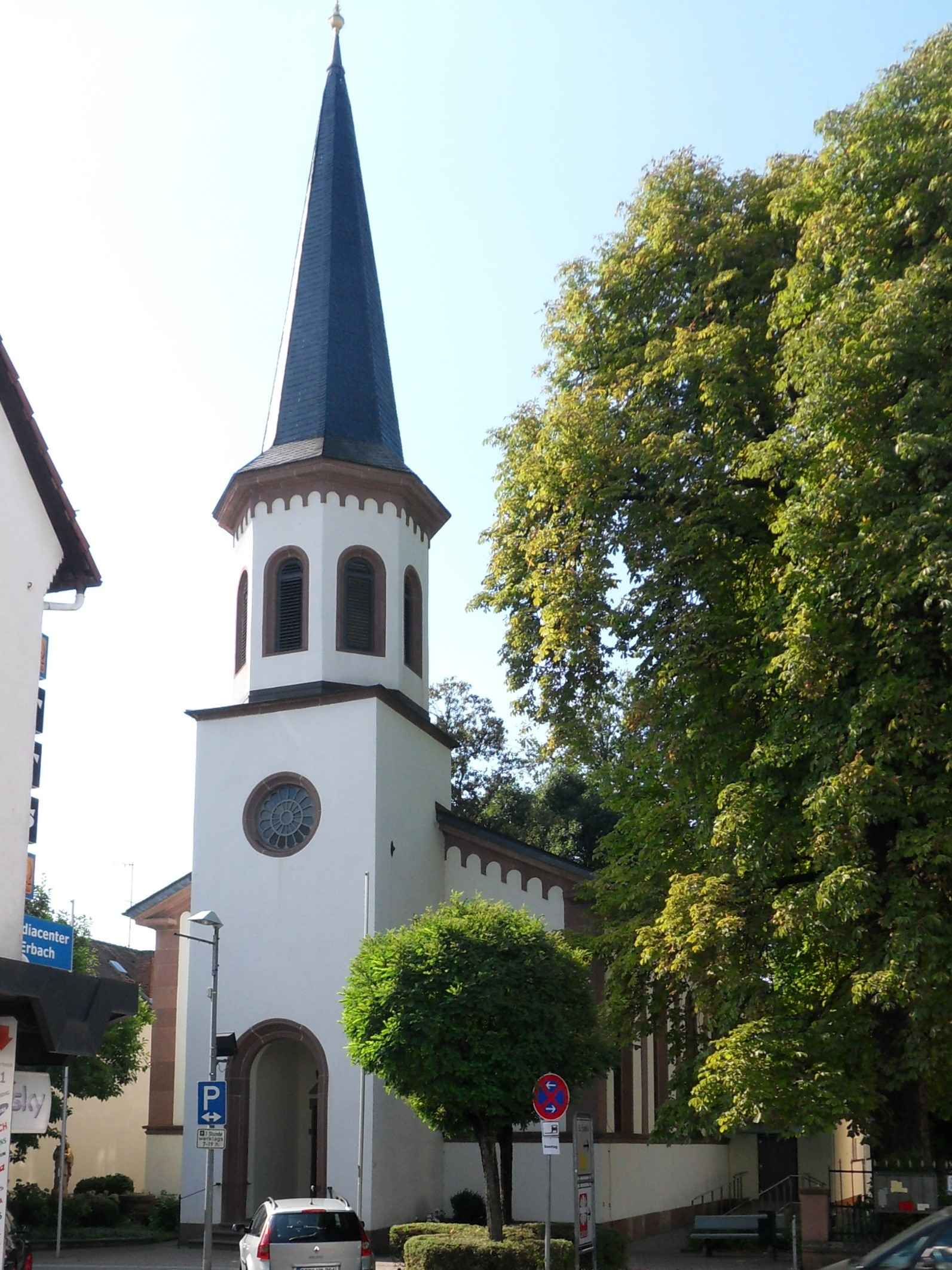
St. Sophia, Erbach

Churches dedicated to Sophia of Rome include:

- St. Sophia in Erbach im Odenwald, Germany
- St. Sophia in Brüssow, Germany
- St. Sophienkirche, Barmbek-Süd, Hamburg, Germany
- St. Sophie in Randau, Magdeburg, Germany
- Santa Sofia d'Epiro, Italy
- Chiesa di Santa Sofia, Capri, Italy
- Santa Sofia, Giugliano in Campania, Italy
- Church of Santa Sofia, Lendinara, Italy
- Santa Sofia, Naples, Italy
- Chapelle Sainte-Sophie, Ille-et-Vilaine, France
- Church of Vera, Nadejda, Lubov and their mother Sophia, Saint Petersburg, Russia
- Church of Saints Sofia and Tatiana of Rome at Filatov Pediatric Clinical Hospital, Moscow, Russia
- St Sophia Greek Orthodox Church, Surry Hills, Sydney, Australia
- Saint Sophia Cathedral (Miami)
- St. Sophia Greek Orthodox Church, Elgin, IL, USA
- St. Sophia Cathedral, Kyiv, Ukraine

== See also ==
- Saints Faith, Hope and Charity
- Holy Wisdom
- Chiesa di Santa Sofia, Capri
- Sophienkirche
