= List of École polytechnique alumni =

This is a list of notable people affiliated with the École polytechnique. Alumni of the École polytechnique are traditionally referred to as "X", or "Xnnnn", where nnnn stands for the year of admission into the school.

== Nobel laureates ==
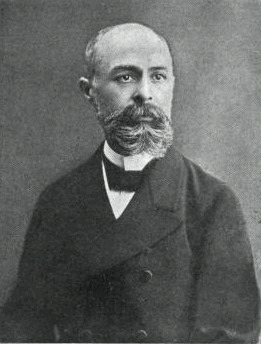
Henri Becquerel, X1872

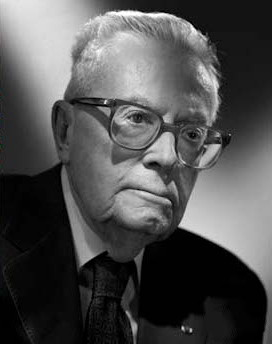
Maurice Allais, X1931

Name	Class year	Notability	Reference(s)
Jean Tirole (1953– )	X1973	Economist, Nobel prize in Economics winner (2014)	
Maurice Allais (1911–2010)	X1931	Economist, Nobel prize in Economics winner (1988)	
Henri Becquerel (1852–1908)	X1872	Physicist, Nobel Prize in Physics winner 1903, [for] his discovery of radioactivity	

== Science, technology, and mathematics ==
Name	Class year	Notability	Reference(s)
Yacine Ait-Sahalia	X1985	Economist, statistician at Princeton University noted for his works on the econometrics of continuous-time models.	
François Arago (1786–1853)	X1803	Mathematician, physicist, astronomer and politician.	
Roger Balian	X1952	Physicist, noted for his works on quantum thermodynamics and theory of measurement, including the Balian-Low theorem	
Gérard Berry	X1967	Computer scientist, member of French Academy of Sciences, professor at Collège de France	
Urbain Le Verrier	X1833	Astronomer, predicted the existence and position of Neptune using only mathematics, leading to its discovery.	
Paul Bert	X1853	Father of Aviation Medicine	
Roger Béteille	X1939	Notable aeronautical engineer, mainly for his work in Airbus A300	
Jean Bertin	X1938	Engineer, inventor of Aérotrain, a hovercraft train	
Louis-Emile Bertin	X1858	Naval engineer, reformed the Japanese military fleet, introduced the Jeune École philosophy	
Fulgence Bienvenüe	X1872	Father of Paris Métro	
Jean-Michel Bismut	X1967	Mathematician (Probability theory; differential geometry); recipient of Prix Ampère (1990); Member of French Academy of Sciences.	
Yves Bréchet	X1981	Physicist, materials scientist, recipient of Körber European Science Award, member of the French Academy of Sciences	
Claude Burdin	X1807	Engineer, recipient of Legion of Honour, member of the French Academy of Sciences, coined term "turbine"	
Albert Caquot	X1899	Engineer, considered the best living French engineer during half a century	
Henry Darcy	X1821	Work on hydraulics, notably the Darcy–Weisbach equation	
Auguste Bravais	X1829	Physicist, noted for his works on crystallography and Bravais lattices	
Irénée-Jules Bienaymé	X1815	Statistician	
Émile Dorand	X1886	Military engineer and aircraft designer, first director of the Service Technique de l'Aéronautique (STAé)	
Alexis Thérèse Petit	X1811	Physicist, noted for his works on Dulong-Petit Law	
Pierre Louis Dulong	X1801	Physicist, noted for his works on Dulong-Petit Law	
Felix Savary	X1815	Astronomer who worked on double stars	
Jacques Babinet	X1812	Notable work on optics and meteorology	
Henri-Alexandre Deslandres	X1872	Astronomer, studied the behavior of the atmosphere of the Sun. Director of the Meudon and Paris Observatories	
Joseph Louis François Bertrand (1822–1900)	X1839	French mathematician who worked in the fields of number theory, differential geometry, probability theory, economics and thermodynamics..	
Jean-Baptiste Biot (1774–1862)	X1794	Physicist, astronomer, and mathematician who established the reality of meteorites, and studied the polarization of light.	
Jean-Victor Poncelet	X1807	Mathematician and engineer	
Jean-Pierre Bourguignon	X1966	Mathematician	
Christophe Breuil	X1989	Proved the Taniyama–Shimura conjecture together with Fred Diamond, Richard Taylor and Brian Conrad in 1999	
Édouard Brézin	X1958	Theoretical physicist, winner of Dirac Prize	
François Hussenot	X1930	Aeronautical engineer, perhaps the first person who invented the flight data recorder	
Guy du Merle (1908–1993)	X1927	Aerospace engineer, test pilot and first director-general of the École nationale de l'aviation civile (French civil aviation university)	
Henri Brocard (1845–1922)	X1865	Mathematician, Brocard points are named after him.	
Emmanuel Candès	X1990	Statistician, Mathematician, winner of Pólya Prize, Fellow of the Society for Industrial and Applied Mathematics	
Rama Cont	X1991	Mathematician, winner of Louis Bachelier Prize (French Academy of Sciences) (2010), Fellow of the Society for Industrial and Applied Mathematics	
Jean-Marc Fontaine	X1965	Mathematician, member of the French Academy of Sciences	
Yves Lambert	X1956	Aerospace engineer, former Director General of Eurocontrol	
Nicolas Léonard Sadi Carnot (1796–1832)	X1812	French physicist, mathematician and engineer who gave the first successful theoretical account of heat engines, the Carnot cycle, and laid the foundations of the second law of thermodynamics.	
Augustin Louis Cauchy (1789–1857)	X1805	Mathematician, formulated the residue theorem	
André-Louis Cholesky	X1895	Mathematician, known for the Cholesky decomposition	
Georges Charpy (1865–1945)	X1887	Invented the Charpy impact test	
Michel Chasles (1793–1880)	X1812	Mathematician	
Henri-Louis le Chatelier (1850–1936)	X1869	Chemist, most famous for devising Le Chatelier's principle	
Émile Clapeyron (1799–1864)	X1816	Physicist, one of the founders of thermodynamics	
Jean-Michel Coron	X1975	Mathematician	
Pierre Henri Hugoniot (1851–1887)	X1872	Physicist, mechanical engineer and scientist. The Rankine–Hugoniot equation is named after him.	
Gustave Coriolis (1792–1843)	X1808	Mathematician, mechanical engineer and scientist. The Coriolis Effect is named after him.	
Charles Fabry (1867–1945)	X1885	Physicist, co-inventor of the Fabry–Pérot interferometer	
Philippe Flajolet (1948–2011)	X1968	Computer scientist	
Augustin Fresnel (1788–1827)	X1804	Physicist, major contributor to wave optics	
Eugène Freyssinet (1879–1962)	X1899	Developed the prestressed concrete	
Camille Jordan (1838–1922)	X1855	Mathematician, known both for his foundational work in group theory and for his Cours d'analyse	
Joseph-Louis Gay-Lussac (1778–1850)	X1797	Chemist and physicist. He is known mostly for the Gay-Lussac's laws related to gases.	
Émile Lemoine (1840–1912)	X1866	Mathematician, known for his proof of the existence of the Lemoine point (or the symmedian point) of a triangle	
Louis Leprince-Ringuet (1901–2000)	X1920	Physicist, telecommunications engineer, essayist and historian of science	
Albert Jacquard	X1945	Geneticist, strong advocate of uneconomic growth	
Gabriel Lamé	X1815	Mathematician, noted for his work on Curvilinear coordinates and Lamé function	
Paul Lévy	X1908	One of the forefathers of the modern theory of stochastic processes	
Alfred-Marie Liénard	X1887	physicist and geologist, noted for his works on Liénard–Wiechert potential	
Joseph Liouville (1809–1882)	X1825	Mathematician	
Stéphane Mallat	X1981	Mathematician	
Étienne-Louis Malus (1775–1812)	X1795	Physicist, mathematician, known for the Malus's law	
Benoît Mandelbrot (1924–2010)	X1944	Mathematician, father of fractal geometry	
Albert Messiah	X1940	Theoretical physicist, engineer of corps of mines	
Bertrand Meyer	X1969	Computer scientist, creator of the Eiffel language and the concept of Design by Contract	
Charles Joseph Minard	X1796	Civil engineer noted for inventions in the field of Information graphics	
Claude-Louis Navier (1785–1836)	X1802	Engineer and physicist who specialized in mechanics. The Navier–Stokes equations are named after him.	
Hélène Perrin	X1995	Physicist	
Henri Poincaré (1854–1912)	X1873	Mathematician, theoretical physicist, and a philosopher of science	
Siméon Denis Poisson (1781–1840)	X1798	Mathematician, geometer, and physicist	
Alfred Potier	X1840	Physicist	
Jean Léonard Marie Poiseuille	X1815	Physicist, noted for his works on fluid mechanics and the Hagen–Poiseuille equation	
Henri Victor Regnault	X1830	Physicist and chemist, mentor of William Kelvin, Copley Medal Recipient	
Raymond Stora	X1951	Theoretical physicist, winner of Dannie Heineman Prize for Mathematical Physics for the BRST quantization	
Adhémar Jean Claude Barré de Saint-Venant	X1813	Notable mechanician and mathematician	
Jean Tirole	X1973	Economist	
Léon Charles Thévenin	X1876	Extended the Ohm's law by Thévenin's theorem	
Louis Vicat	X1804	Engineer, inventor of the Vicat needle	
Michel Virlogeux	X1967	Engineer of the Millau Viaduct.	
Jean Zinn-Justin	X1964	Theoretical physicist, member of Académie des Sciences	
Rose Dieng-Kuntz	enrolled 1976	Artificial intelligence, first African woman to enroll in the École	
Patrick Ky	X1986	CEO of the European Aviation Safety Agency	
Alexis Bonnet	X1985	Mathematician (1996 EMS Prize), investor, founder of the management company Methodology Asset Management	
Yves Poilane	X1979	Director General of IONIS Education Group	
Louis Pouzin	X1950	Inventor of the datagram and designer of an early packet communications network, CYCLADES	
Anne-Marie Lagrange	X1982	Astrophysicist, French Academy of Sciences, discovered the exoplanet Beta Pictoris b	
Bassam Fayad	X2000	Mathematician, Michael and Eugenia Brin Endowed Chair Professor at the University of Maryland, College Park	
Hong Wang	X2010	Mathematician (2026 Fields Medal)	

== Humanities, arts, and social sciences ==
Name	Class year	Notability	Reference(s)
Auguste Comte	X1814	Philosopher, founder of the discipline of sociology and of the doctrine of positivism.	
Roger Guesnerie	X1962	Economist	
Charles Koechlin	X1887	Composer	
Edmond Malinvaud	X1942	Economist, first president of the Pontifical Academy of Social Sciences.	
Bernard Salanié	X1984	Columbia University economist, former director of the Center for Research in Economics and Statistics and ENSAE ParisTech	
Pierre Schaeffer	X1929	Noted for innovative work in communications and acoustics	
Jean Tirole	X1973	Economist	
Marc Chervel	X1952	Economist	

== Business ==
Name	Class year	Notability	Reference(s)
Bernard Arnault	X1969	CEO of LVMH	
Claude Bébéar	X1955	Former CEO and Chairman of the Supervisory Board of Axa, widely considered the Godfather of French business	
Jean-Paul Béchat	X1962	former CEO of Safran	
Jean-Louis Beffa	X1960	CEO of Saint-Gobain	
Driss Benhima	X1974	Chairman of the Board and CEO of Royal Air Maroc	
Georges Besse		CEO of Renault when assassinated by Action directe	
Fulgence Bienvenüe	X1870	Founder of the Paris Métro	
André Citroën	X1898	Founder of Citroën Corporation	
Jean-Marc Daniel	X1974	Economist	
Serge Dassault	X1946	CEO of the Dassault Group	
Thierry Desmarest	X1964	CEO of Total	
Guy Dollé	X1963	CEO of Arcelor	
Patrick Drahi	X1983	Founder and CEO of Altice.	
Marc Fleury	X1989	Founder of JBoss Inc.	
Jean-Martin Folz	X1966	Former CEO of PSA Peugeot Citroën	
Jean-René Fourtou	X1960	CEO of Vivendi	
Pierre Gadonneix	X1962	CEO of Électricité de France	
Carlos Ghosn	X1974	CEO of Nissan and Renault	
Paul Hermelin	X1972	CEO of Capgemini	
Jean-Paul Herteman	X1970	CEO of Safran	
Alexandre de Juniac	X1981	CEO of Air France–KLM	
Patrick Kron	X1973	CEO of Alstom	
Didier Lombard	X1962	CEO of France Telecom	
Jean-Marie Messier	X1976	Former head of Vivendi Universal	
Gérard Mestrallet	X1968	CEO of Suez	
Frédéric Oudéa	X1980	CEO of Société Générale	
Michel Pébereau	X1961	head of BNP Paribas	
Pierre Pringuet	X1969	CEO of Pernod Ricard	
Denis Ranque	X1970	CEO of Thales Group	
Ambroise Roux		CEO, Compagnie générale d'électricité	
Conrad Schlumberger	X1898	One of the Schlumberger brothers who founded the Société de Prospection Électrique, that became later Schlumberger Limited	
Serge Tchuruk	X1958	Former CEO of Total, CEO of Alcatel	
Tidjane Thiam	X1982	Former CEO of Credit Suisse	

== Politics and public service ==
Name	Class year	Notability	Reference(s)
Jacques Attali	X1963	writer and President Mitterrand's advisor	
Christian Beullac	X1943	Industrialist, Minister	
Philippe Crébassa	X	CEO of Toulouse–Blagnac Airport	
Marie François Sadi Carnot	X1857	former President of the French Republic	
Valéry Giscard d'Estaing	X1944	former President of the French Republic	
Fabienne Keller	X1979	former mayor of Strasbourg	
Nathalie Kosciusko-Morizet	X1992	Secretary of state of ecology	
Albert Lebrun	X1890	former President of the French Republic	
Bruno Mégret	X1969	French far-right politician	
Francis Mer	X1959	former Minister of Finances	
Nguyen Ngoc Bich	X1933	Francophile anticolonialist, resistance hero against the French colonialists in Vietnam's First Indochina War, medical doctor, politician	
Louis Pailhas	X1946	civil servant, former head of the École nationale de l'aviation civile	
Jean Peyrelevade	X1958	civil servant, politician and business leader.	
Gérard Rozenknop	X1969	former head of the École nationale de l'aviation civile	
Jacques Rueff	X1919	former Deputy Governor of the Bank of France	
Jean-Paul Troadec	X1967	President of the French Bureau d'Enquêtes et d'Analyses pour la Sécurité de l'Aviation Civile	
Farid Zizi	X1982	CEO of the Direction des Services de la navigation aérienne	
Abdourahmane Cissé	X2001	Minister to the Prime Minister in charge of the Budget of Côte d'Ivoire	
Élisabeth Borne	X1981	Prime Minister of France	

== Military ==
Name	Class year	Notability	Reference(s)
Caroline Aigle	X1994	First woman to be fighter pilot in the French Air Force.	
Jules Brunet	X1857	inspired the motion picture The Last Samurai	
Pierre Philippe Denfert-Rochereau	X1842	French colonel who successfully defended Belfort during the Franco-Prussian war	
Émile Dorand	X1886	Military engineer and aircraft designer	
Alfred Dreyfus	X1878	Dreyfus affair	
Jean-Baptiste Eugène Estienne	X1879	"Father of the Tanks"	
Honoré d'Estienne d'Orves	X1921	"First martyr of Free France"	
Émile Fayolle	X1873	Marshal of France promoter of artillery during World War I	
Ferdinand Foch	X1871	Supreme Allied Commander in World War I	
Joseph Joffre	X1869	Commander-in-chief of French forces of the Western Front in World War I from 1914 to 1916	
Emile-René Lemonnier	X1912	French general beheaded by Japanese forces in French Indochina at the beginning of World War II for refusing to sign surrender documents.	
Agénor Azéma de Montgravier	X1828	Chef d'escadron of Artillery from 1850, deputy director of the Ecole d'Artillerie de Montpellier from 1859, pioneer archaeologist in North Africa.	
Robert Nivelle		Commander-in-chief of French Forces of the Western Front in World War I from 1916 to 1917	

== Aviators and astronauts ==
Name	Class year	Notability	Reference(s)
Jean Boulet	X1940	World record for helicopter altitude still standing	
Jean-François Clervoy	X1978	Three space missions	
Philippe Perrin	X1982	One space mission with three EVAs	

== Religious leaders ==
Name	Class year	Notability	Reference(s)
