= Abdourahmane =

Abdourahmane is a surname. Notable people with the surname include:

- Abdourahmane Barry (born 2000), French footballer
- Abdourahmane Cissé (born 1981), Ivorian politician
- Abdourahmane Mamane (born 1997), Nigerien footballer
- Abdourahmane N'Diaye (basketball) (born 1953), Senegalese basketball player
- Abdourahmane Ndiaye (footballer) (born 1996), Senegalese footballer
- Abdourahmane Ndour (born 1986), Senegalese sprinter
- Abdourahmane Sarr (born 1968), Senegalese economist
- Abdourahmane Sow (1942–2023), Senegalese politician
- Thierno Abdourahmane Bah (1916–2013), Guinean writer
