= Flight 129 =

Flight 129 may refer to:

- Airbus Industrie Flight 129, which crashed on 30 June 1994
- Air China Flight 129, which crashed on 15 April 2002
