= Driss Benhima =

Moroccan businessman

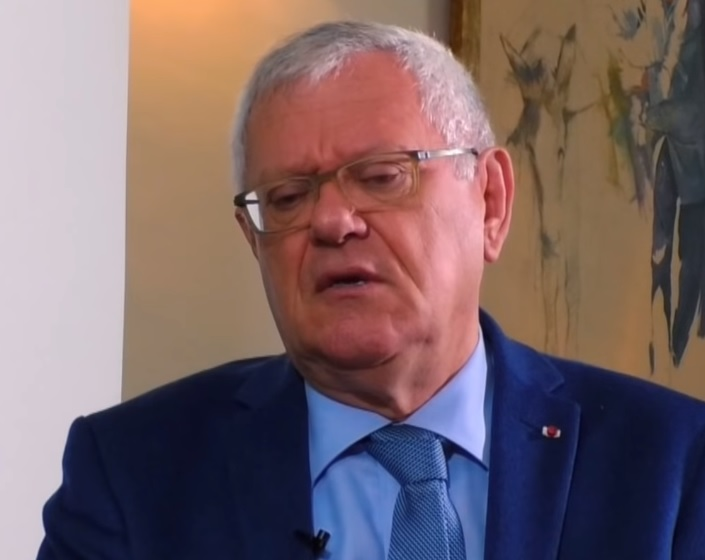

Royal Air Maroc, chairman CEO
- In office 15 February 2006 – 2 February 2016
- Preceded by: Mohamed Berrada

Personal details
- Born: 28 May 1954 (age 72)

Driss Benhima (Arabic: إدريس بنهيمة; born 28 May 1954) is a Moroccan businessman. He is a former chairman of the board and CEO of Royal Air Maroc, the national airline of Morocco.

== Career ==
Benhima joined Office Cherifien des Phosphates (OCP), Moroccan state-owned phosphate world leader, as a junior field engineer in Khouribga. After the first 6 years he spent there, he became Mining Facilities Manager. He was appointed in 1990 CEO of Casablanca-based Société Marocaine d'Oxygène et d'Acétylène, Moroccan subsidiary of Air Liquide group, world leader in industrial gases. On 19 March 1994, he was appointed CEO of Office National de l'Electricité (ONE), Morocco's national power authority. He has notably tackled the issue of insufficient access to electricity in rural communities. The global rural electrification program's objective was to generalize access before 2010. His successor Ahmed Nakkouch pushed further the initiative: the program is due to reach its target in 2007. During his CEO mandate, he has been a member of the transition government led by Dr. Abdellatif Filali (between August 1997 and March 1998) in preparation of the Alternance, the Socialist Union of Popular Forces and socialist Abderrahmane Youssoufi coming to power. Benhima was then Minister of Transport, Energy, Tourism, Mining and Merchant Navy. From July 2001 to 26 March 2003, Mr Benhima assumed the office of Governor of the Wilaya of Great Casablanca. He was appointed Director of the Agency for the Promotion and the Economic and Social Development of the Northern Prefectures and Provinces of the Moroccan Kingdom (APDN) in March 2004.

== RAM Appointment ==
He was appointed to the position of Royal Air Maroc's CEO by King Mohammed VI on 15 February 2006. In 2016 and after a decision of King Mohammed VI in the Council of Ministers, Benhima was replaced by Hmido Adou, who served as president of the Moroccan National Office of Tourism until 2013.

== Education ==
After secondary studies at Lycée Descartes (French-system college) in Rabat, he obtained a scientific baccalauréat in 1971. He then joined Lycée Sainte-Geneviève in Versailles where he successfully prepared for engineering schools entry exams.

He graduated with engineering degrees from the École Polytechnique in 1978 (X1974, Major among foreign applicants) with last year's specialisation at the École des Mines de Paris.

== Miscellaneous ==
Benhima was born on 28 May 1954.

He was honoured with the Moroccan Order of the Throne (Commander).

He has represented Morocco during the 1994 General Agreement on Tariffs and Trade (GATT) meetings in Marrakesh (the Marrakesh Agreement transformed the GATT into the World Trade Organization).

Between 1995 and 1999, he was member of the G14, a think tank established by King Hassan II.

In 1999, Hassan II assigned to Benhima the promotion of the Moroccan bid to host the 2006 FIFA World Cup, and was also assigned the same role in the 2010 FIFA World Cup.

Mr Benhima has launched a cinema club during his time in Khouribga and wrote film interpretation essays. He is currently a member of the board of directors of the Marrakech International Film Festival Foundation.

He is the president of Hawd Asfi, Safi-based non-profit organization (حوض ٱسفي).
