= Philippe Crébassa =

French public servant

- Education: École Polytechnique; École nationale de l'aviation civile Toulouse School of Economics
- Occupation: President of Toulouse-Blagnac Airport
- Employer: Toulouse-Blagnac Airport
- Known for: President of Toulouse-Blagnac Airport
- Predecessor: Jean-Michel Vernhes

Philippe Crébassa is a French public servant who is the current president of the Toulouse-Blagnac Airport. He succeeded Jean-Michel Vernhes in that position.

== Biography ==
Crébassa graduated from École Polytechnique, the École nationale de l'aviation civile, and the Toulouse School of Economics.

He started his career as an economist for the Directorate General for Civil Aviation in 1992. Within the Directorate, he became head of infrastructure, communication, and navigation in 1997; head of development, air traffic control training in 2002; and head of innovation, en route air traffic control in 2005.

He joined Egis avia in 2007 as business development manager for Europe, India, and southeast Asia. In 2009, he was made chief strategy officer, and in 2011, he became the chief operating officer. From 2013 to 2018, he was vice-president of the École nationale de l'aviation civile. In June 2018, he became the CEO of the Toulouse-Blagnac Airport.
