= Philippe Jamet =

French engineer and professor (born 1961)

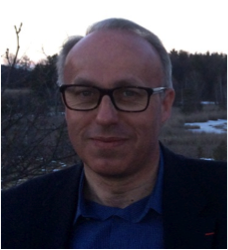
- Born: 12 May 1962 (age 64); Rennes, France
- Education: Doctor of Philosophy; Master's degree
- Alma mater: Mines Paris – PSL; Pierre and Marie Curie University
- Occupation: Director General
- Years active: 1981–present
- Employer: IONIS Education Group
- Known for: Director General of IONIS Education Group
- Predecessor: Yves Poilane

Philippe Jamet (born 12 May 1961) is a French engineer and academic. He is a member of the Academy of Technologies. He served as Director General of the Institut Mines-Télécom from July 15, 2014 to the 1st of September 2019 and is an honorary president of the Conférence des Grandes écoles.

== Biography ==
Jamet was born in Rennes on May 12, 1961. He graduated as a Civil Mining Engineer in 1981 from the École nationale supérieure des mines de Paris (now Mines Paris - PSL). He later earned a doctorate in quantitative hydrology and hydrogeology in 1991. In 1999, he obtained an habilitation in environmental sciences from Pierre and Marie Curie University.

From September 2008 to July 2014, Jamet served as director of the École nationale supérieure des mines de Saint-Étienne. He was President of the Conférence des Grandes écoles from June 2013 to June 2015.

He was appointed Director General of the Institut Mines-Télécom. From July 2014 to January 2024, he served as Dean of the Paris School of Business. On 15 February 2024, he was appointed Director General of the IONIS Education Group, succeeding Yves Poilane.

== Awards ==
- 2003: Knight of the Academic Palms
- 2010: Medal of the National Assembly
- 2011: Knight of the Legion of Honor
