= Duppigheim station =

French railway station

Duppigheim
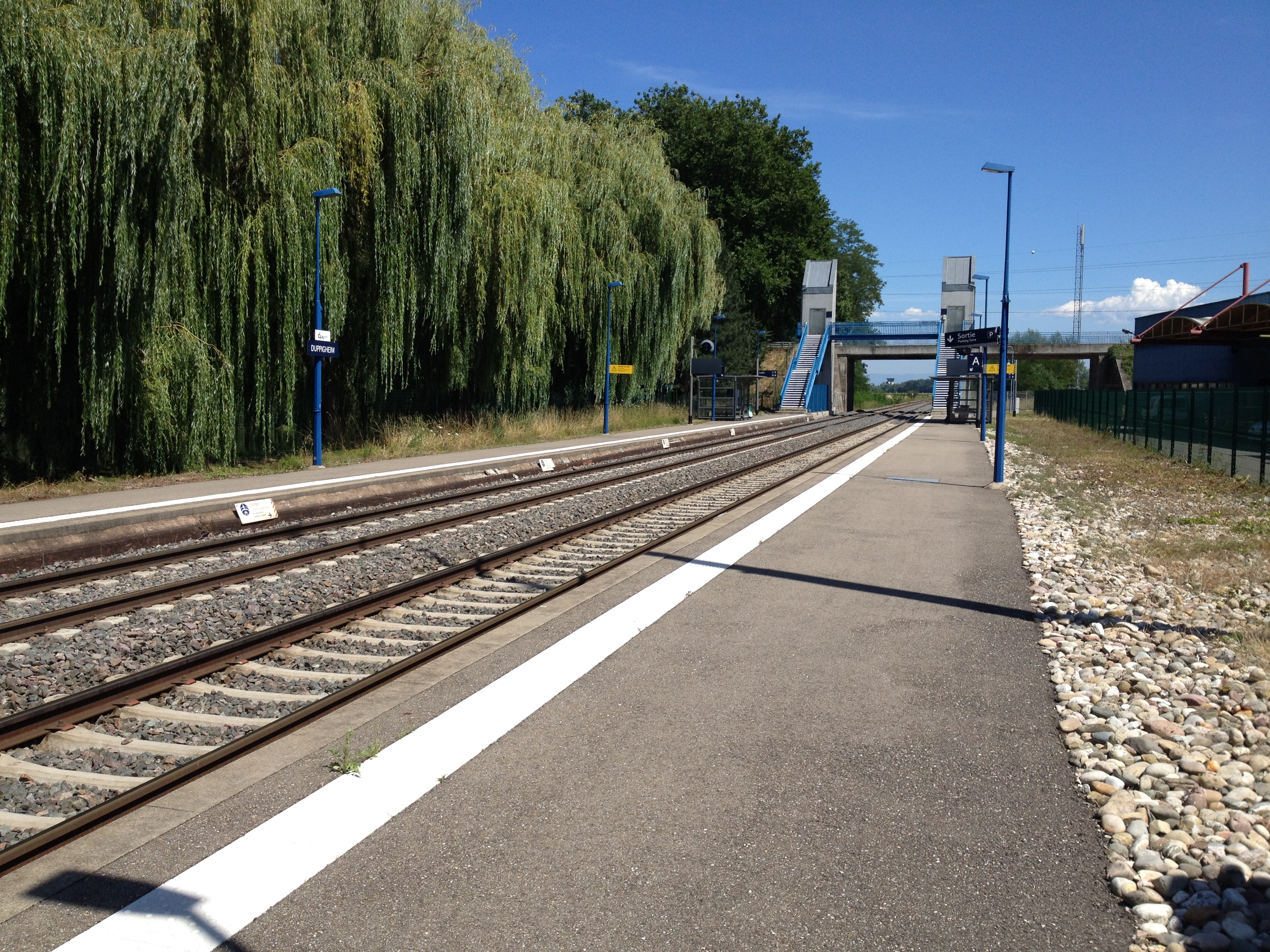
- The tracks, the platforms and the footbridge at the station

General information
- Location: Place de la Gare or D111, 67120 Duppigheim
- Coordinates: 48°32′39″N 7°35′14″E
- Owner: SNCF
- Line: Strasbourg–Saint-Dié railway
- Tracks: 2

Construction
- Parking: yes
- Cycle facilities: yes

Other information
- Station code: 87214536
- Website: Halte de Duppigheim

History
- Opened: 28 September 1864

Services
Preceding station	TER Grand Est	Following station
Duttlenheim towards Molsheim	A18	Entzheim-Aéroport towards Strasbourg
Location

Gare de Duppigheim is a French railway station located on the Strasbourg–Saint-Dié railway. It is located within the commune of Duppigheim, close to the village of Kolbsheim, in departement Bas-Rhin, in northeastern France. It serves the economic zone of the Bruche plains.

The station was put in operation in 1864 by the Compagnie des chemins de fer de l'Est (Eastern Railways Company). It is a travellers stop station of the SNCF. Belonging to the TER Grand Est network, the station is only served by regional express trains.

== Location ==
Established at an altitude of 157 meters, the Duppigheim station is located at the kilometric point 12.305 of the Strasbourg–Saint-Dié railway, between the stations of Entzheim-Aéroport and of Duttlenheim.

== History ==
The "Duppigheim–Kolbsheim" station was put into operation on 28 September 1864, by the Compagnie des chemins de fer de l'Est (Eastern Railway Company), when the latter began the operation of the vicinal railway n°1 from Strasbourg to Barr.

As of 2014, it is a travellers station of local interest (category C: less than 100 000 travellers/year from 2010 to 2011).

== Travellers service ==
=== Reception ===
Being a SNCF stopping station, it is a staffless station with free access. It is equipped with automatic machines allowing travellers to purchase tickets, and includes two platforms and two shelters. Special layouts and equipments allow disabled people to access the station. The station is accessible from the Place de la Gare or from the new access created from the D111 road.

The crossing of the tracks and the passing from one platform to the other is performed by a footbridge, which is accessible from the platforms by taking the stairs or the lifts.

=== Serving ===
The Duppigheim station belongs to the TER Grand Est network and is only served by regional express trains of the Strasbourg – Entzheim-Aéroport – Molsheim liaison (line n°18).

=== Parking ===
A bicycle parking and two car parkings (one on the Place de la Gare and another near the D111 road) are fitted out at the station.
