= Duppigheim =

Duppigheim Díppje
- Commune
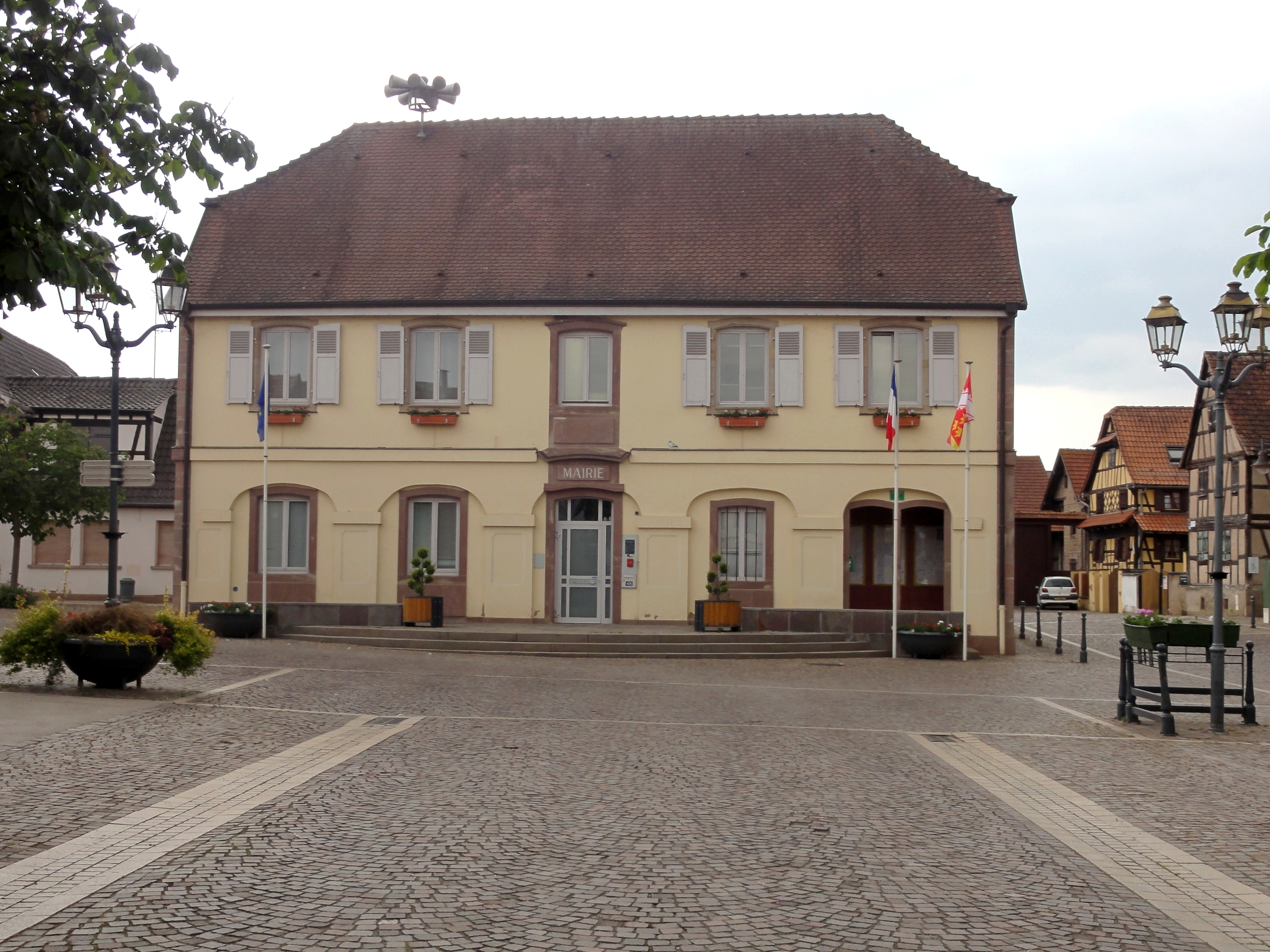
- The town hall in Duppigheim

- Coat of arms
- Location of Duppigheim
- Location within France Location within Grand Est
- Coordinates: 48°31′46″N 7°35′39″E
- Country: France
- Region: Grand Est
- Department: Bas-Rhin
- Arrondissement: Molsheim
- Canton: Molsheim

Government
  - Mayor (2020–2026): Julien Haegy
- Area^{1}: 7.38 km^{2} (2.85 sq mi)
- Highest elevation: 176 m (577 ft)
- Lowest elevation: 151 m (495 ft)
- Population (2023): 1,906
  - Density: 258/km^{2} (669/sq mi)
- Time zone: UTC+01:00 (CET)
  - Summer (DST): UTC+02:00 (CEST)
- INSEE/Postal code: 67108 /67120
- ^{1} French Land Register data, which excludes lakes, ponds, glaciers > 1 km^{2} (0.386 sq mi or 247 acres) and river estuaries.

Duppigheim (French pronunciation: [dypiɡaim]; German: Düppigheim; Alsatian: Dìppje) is a commune in the Bas-Rhin department in Grand Est in north-eastern France. Duppigheim station has rail connections to Strasbourg and Molsheim.

== Notable people ==
- Jean Bugatti died in a car accident in Duppigheim
- Arsène Wenger gave his name to the Stadium of Duppigheim

== See also ==
- Communes of the Bas-Rhin department
