= Jean-Michel Vernhes =

French public servant (born 1950)

- Born: 1950 (age 75–76); Mazamet, France
- Education: Aerospace engineer
- Alma mater: École nationale de l'aviation civile
- Occupations: President of the French Airports (Union des aéroports français) and of Toulouse-Blagnac Airport
- Employer: Toulouse-Blagnac Airport
- Known for: President of the French Airports (Union des aéroports français) and of Toulouse-Blagnac Airport
- Predecessor: Claude Terrazzoni

Jean-Michel Vernhes (born 1950 at Mazamet) is a French public servant. He is the current President of French Airports (Union des aéroports français) and of Toulouse-Blagnac Airport.

== Biography ==
Graduate from classes préparatoires aux grandes écoles at Lycée Pierre-de-Fermat (Toulouse) and from the École nationale de l'aviation civile (French civil aviation university, promotion 1971), Jean-Michel Vernhes starts his career in 1975 at the air traffic control center of Bordeaux. In 1980, he moves to Paris where he is responsible for the certification of radio navigation equipment. In 1986, he became President of the Nouvelle-Calédonie air navigation center. He comes back to Paris in 1989 to work until 1993 at the aircraft certification department. In 1993, he became responsible for human resources at the French air navigation service before being nominated President of Toulouse-Blagnac Airport in 1999.

The 18 May 2011, in addition, he became President of the French Airports (Union des aéroports français).

== Award ==
- Officier of the Légion d'honneur

== Bibliography ==
- Académie nationale de l'air et de l'espace and Lucien Robineau, Les français du ciel, dictionnaire historique, Le Cherche midi, June 2005, 782 p. (ISBN 2-7491-0415-7)
