= Entzheim =

Entzheim Anze
- Commune
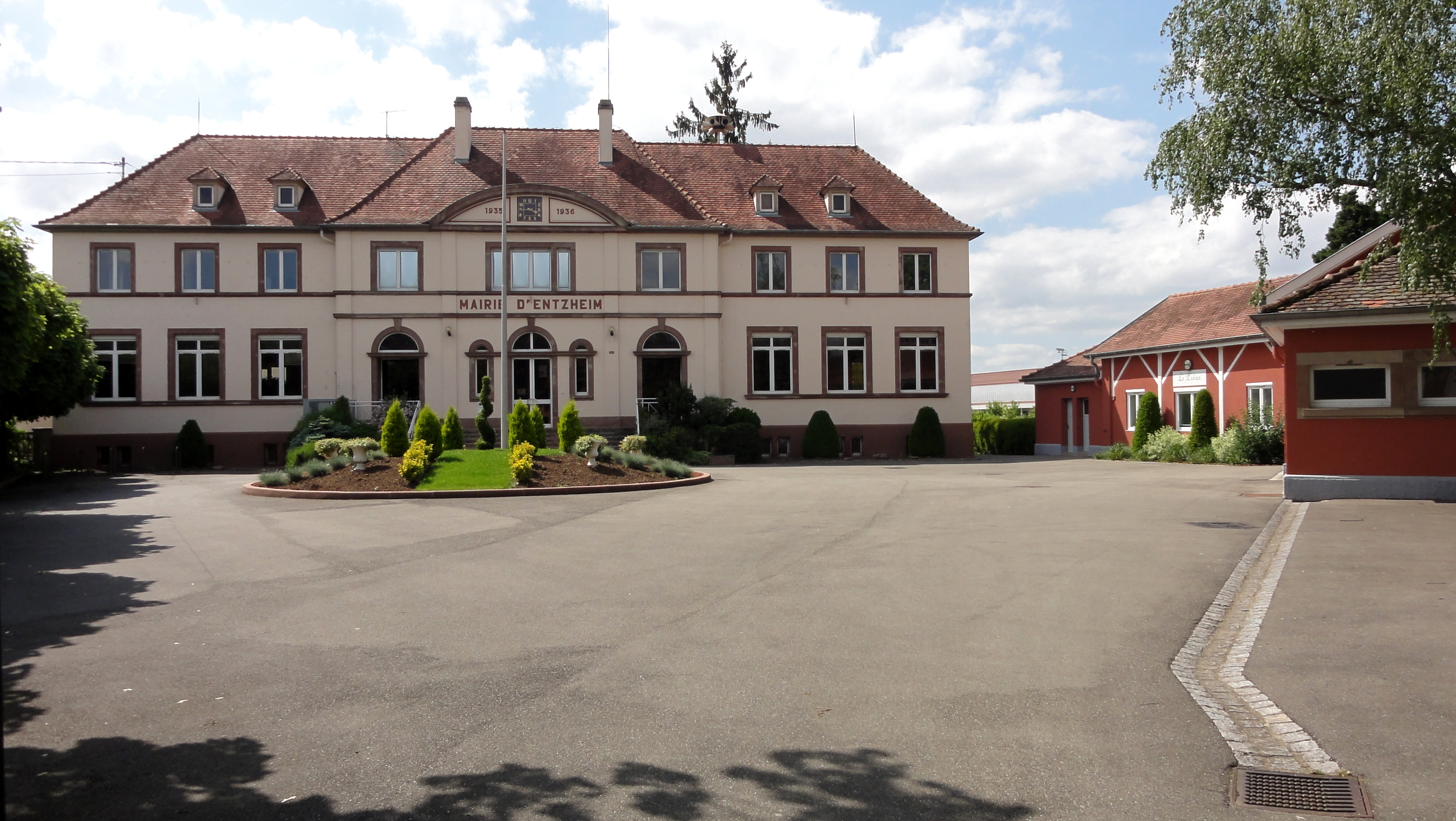
- The town hall in Entzheim

- Coat of arms
- Location of Entzheim
- Location within France Location within Grand Est
- Coordinates: 48°32′07″N 7°38′17″E
- Country: France
- Region: Grand Est
- Department: Bas-Rhin
- Arrondissement: Strasbourg
- Canton: Lingolsheim
- Intercommunality: Strasbourg Eurométropole

Government
  - Mayor (2020–2026): Jean Humann
- Area^{1}: 8.17 km^{2} (3.15 sq mi)
- Highest elevation: 159 m (522 ft)
- Lowest elevation: 144 m (472 ft)
- Population (2023): 2,544
  - Density: 311/km^{2} (806/sq mi)
- Time zone: UTC+01:00 (CET)
  - Summer (DST): UTC+02:00 (CEST)
- INSEE/Postal code: 67124 /67960
- ^{1} French Land Register data, which excludes lakes, ponds, glaciers > 1 km^{2} (0.386 sq mi or 247 acres) and river estuaries.

Entzheim (French pronunciation: [ɛns(h)ajm]; German: Enzheim [ˈɛntshaɪm]) is a commune, in the Bas-Rhin department in Grand Est in north-eastern France.

The Strasbourg Airport is located in the commune.

== Climate ==
The climate is oceanic (Köppen: Cfb), more extreme than most other French cities.

Climate data for Strasbourg-Entzheim (Strasbourg Airport), elevation: 154 m or 505 ft, 1981-2010 normals and extremes
Month	Jan	Feb	Mar	Apr	May	Jun	Jul	Aug	Sep	Oct	Nov	Dec	Year
Record high °C (°F)	17.5 (63.5)	21.1 (70.0)	25.7 (78.3)	30.0 (86.0)	33.4 (92.1)	37.0 (98.6)	38.3 (100.9)	38.7 (101.7)	33.4 (92.1)	29.1 (84.4)	22.1 (71.8)	18.3 (64.9)	38.7 (101.7)
Mean daily maximum °C (°F)	4.5 (40.1)	6.4 (43.5)	11.4 (52.5)	15.7 (60.3)	20.2 (68.4)	23.4 (74.1)	25.7 (78.3)	25.4 (77.7)	21.0 (69.8)	15.3 (59.5)	8.8 (47.8)	5.2 (41.4)	15.3 (59.5)
Daily mean °C (°F)	1.8 (35.2)	2.9 (37.2)	7 (45)	10.5 (50.9)	15 (59)	18.1 (64.6)	20.1 (68.2)	19.8 (67.6)	15.8 (60.4)	11.2 (52.2)	5.8 (42.4)	2.8 (37.0)	11 (52)
Mean daily minimum °C (°F)	−0.8 (30.6)	−0.6 (30.9)	2.5 (36.5)	5.2 (41.4)	9.8 (49.6)	12.8 (55.0)	14.5 (58.1)	14.1 (57.4)	10.6 (51.1)	7.1 (44.8)	2.8 (37.0)	0.3 (32.5)	6.6 (43.9)
Record low °C (°F)	−23.6 (−10.5)	−22.3 (−8.1)	−16.7 (1.9)	−5.6 (21.9)	−2.4 (27.7)	1.1 (34.0)	4.9 (40.8)	4.8 (40.6)	−1.3 (29.7)	−7.6 (18.3)	−10.8 (12.6)	−23.4 (−10.1)	−23.6 (−10.5)
Average precipitation mm (inches)	32.2 (1.27)	34.5 (1.36)	42.8 (1.69)	45.9 (1.81)	81.9 (3.22)	71.6 (2.82)	72.7 (2.86)	61.4 (2.42)	63.5 (2.50)	61.5 (2.42)	47.0 (1.85)	50.0 (1.97)	665.0 (26.18)
Average precipitation days	8.4	8.1	9.1	9.2	11.5	10.7	10.8	9.9	8.6	9.5	9.3	9.8	114.9
Mean monthly sunshine hours	58.1	83.8	134.8	180.0	202.5	223.8	228.6	219.6	164.5	98.7	55.3	43.1	1,692.7
Source: Meteo France

Climate data for Strasbourg-Entzheim (Strasbourg Airport), elevation: 154 m or 505 ft, 1961-1990 normals and extremes
Month	Jan	Feb	Mar	Apr	May	Jun	Jul	Aug	Sep	Oct	Nov	Dec	Year
Record high °C (°F)	15.8 (60.4)	21.1 (70.0)	25.7 (78.3)	29.5 (85.1)	30.9 (87.6)	33.8 (92.8)	36.0 (96.8)	37.0 (98.6)	33.1 (91.6)	29.1 (84.4)	21.0 (69.8)	18.3 (64.9)	37.0 (98.6)
Mean maximum °C (°F)	8.2 (46.8)	13.0 (55.4)	14.6 (58.3)	18.3 (64.9)	22.8 (73.0)	26.7 (80.1)	29.6 (85.3)	26.8 (80.2)	24.8 (76.6)	18.1 (64.6)	12.0 (53.6)	8.9 (48.0)	29.6 (85.3)
Mean daily maximum °C (°F)	4.1 (39.4)	5.8 (42.4)	10.2 (50.4)	14.6 (58.3)	18.9 (66.0)	22.1 (71.8)	24.3 (75.7)	24.2 (75.6)	20.9 (69.6)	14.8 (58.6)	8.1 (46.6)	4.4 (39.9)	14.4 (57.9)
Daily mean °C (°F)	1.4 (34.5)	2.7 (36.9)	5.7 (42.3)	9.5 (49.1)	13.4 (56.1)	16.9 (62.4)	18.8 (65.8)	18.6 (65.5)	15.5 (59.9)	10.8 (51.4)	5.3 (41.5)	1.7 (35.1)	10.0 (50.0)
Mean daily minimum °C (°F)	−1.2 (29.8)	−0.5 (31.1)	1.5 (34.7)	4.5 (40.1)	8.5 (47.3)	12.0 (53.6)	13.2 (55.8)	13.1 (55.6)	10.4 (50.7)	6.6 (43.9)	2.2 (36.0)	−0.7 (30.7)	5.8 (42.4)
Mean minimum °C (°F)	−8.0 (17.6)	−8.9 (16.0)	−1.7 (28.9)	2.6 (36.7)	6.7 (44.1)	10.0 (50.0)	11.9 (53.4)	11.1 (52.0)	6.7 (44.1)	2.4 (36.3)	−1.0 (30.2)	−5.9 (21.4)	−8.9 (16.0)
Record low °C (°F)	−23.2 (−9.8)	−20.8 (−5.4)	−16.7 (1.9)	−4.6 (23.7)	−2.1 (28.2)	3.4 (38.1)	4.9 (40.8)	5.0 (41.0)	−0.6 (30.9)	−5.9 (21.4)	−10.8 (12.6)	−17.3 (0.9)	−23.2 (−9.8)
Average precipitation mm (inches)	31.6 (1.24)	29.4 (1.16)	32.2 (1.27)	37.7 (1.48)	68.6 (2.70)	69.2 (2.72)	61.0 (2.40)	68.3 (2.69)	44.6 (1.76)	40.7 (1.60)	42.6 (1.68)	39.8 (1.57)	565.7 (22.27)
Average precipitation days (≥ 1.0 mm)	9.5	7.0	8.5	10.0	12.0	10.5	9.5	10.0	8.0	7.5	9.0	9.5	111
Average snowy days	8.0	5.5	3.0	1.0	0	0	0	0	0	trace	2.0	5.0	24.5
Average relative humidity (%)	86	82	76	72	73	74	72	76	80	85	86	86	79
Mean monthly sunshine hours	42.4	78.5	122.5	161.0	197.4	212.0	239.5	214.5	167.5	101.3	57.8	42.6	1,637
Percentage possible sunshine	16.0	28.0	34.0	40.0	42.0	45.0	50.0	49.0	45.0	31.0	21.0	17.0	34.8
Source 1: NOAA
Source 2: Infoclimat.fr View climate chart for this period

== Population ==
Historical population
Year	Pop.	±% p.a.
1968	1,153	—
1975	1,092	−0.77%
1982	1,173	+1.03%
1990	1,796	+5.47%
1999	1,855	+0.36%
2007	1,796	−0.40%
2012	2,007	+2.25%
2017	2,390	+3.55%
2023	2,544	+1.05%
Source: INSEE

== Education ==
A preschool (école maternelle) and an elementary school are located in the commune.

== Economy ==
Entzheim serves as the headquarters of sportswear and equipment company Le Coq Sportif.

== Archeological sites ==
Excavations at the Entzheim-Geispolsheim archaeological site allowed the discovery of approximately fifty Neolithic burials.

== History ==
The village of Entzheim was first mentioned in 736, under the reign of Pepin the Short.

It belonged to the Murbach abbey, part of the great abbey of Saint-Denis. The village was granted in fief to the Duke of Lorraine.

The village endured the Thirty Years' War, then the Franco-Dutch War, with the Battle of Entzheim on 4 October 1674, between Turenne's army and that of the Imperials, which ended in an indecisive but deadly battle on the site of today's airport.

== Gallery ==
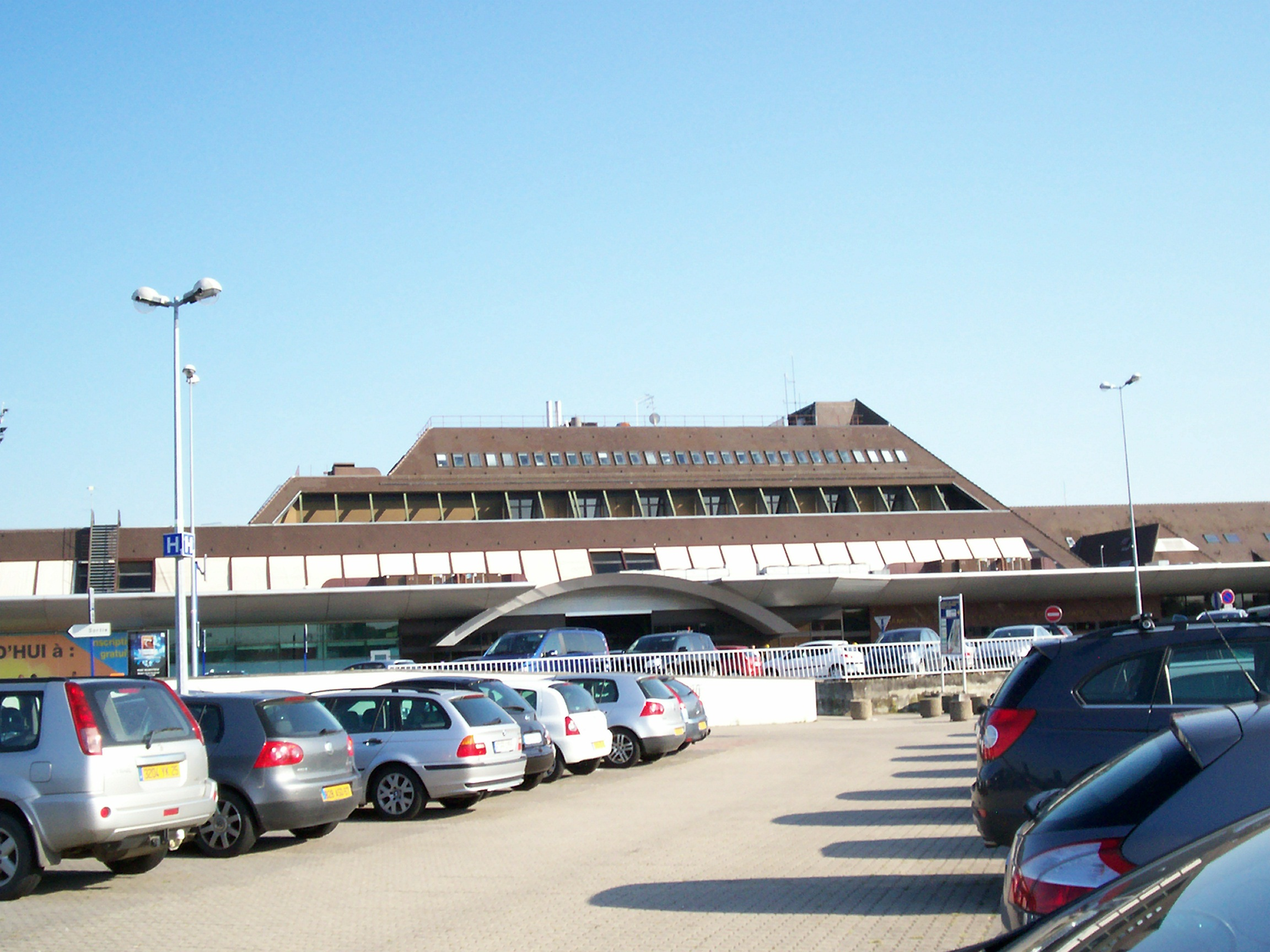
Strasbourg Entzheim Airport

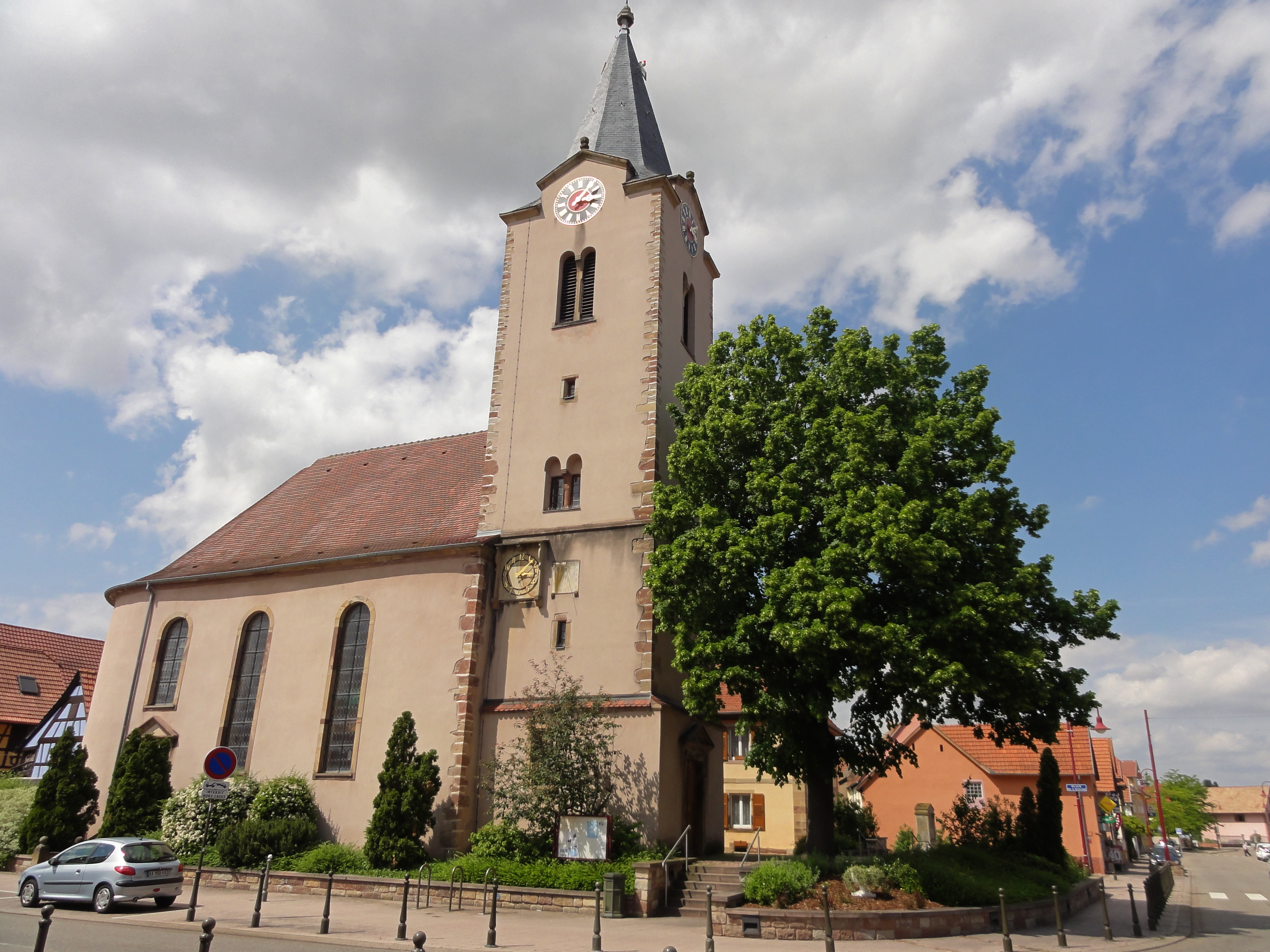

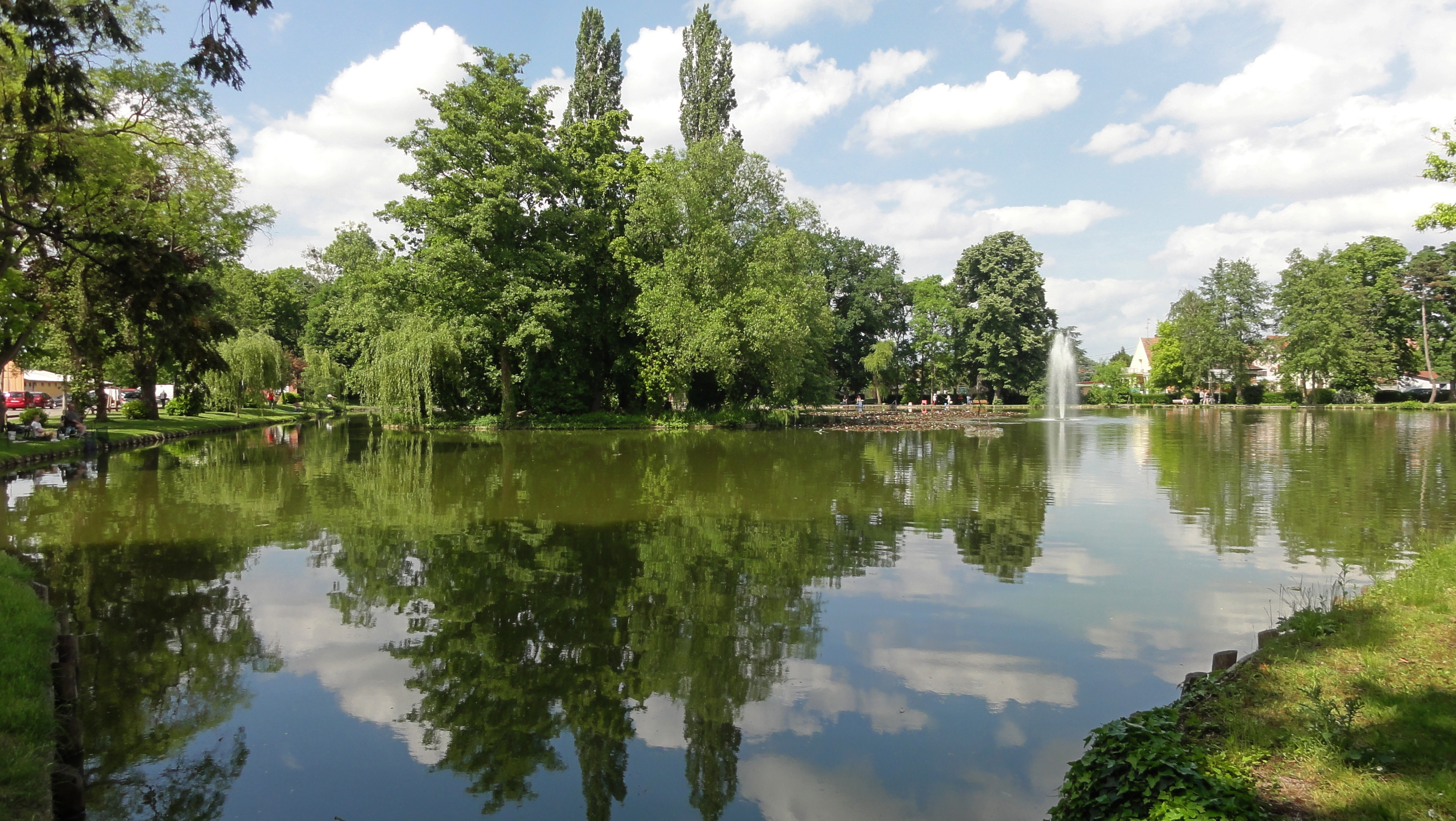

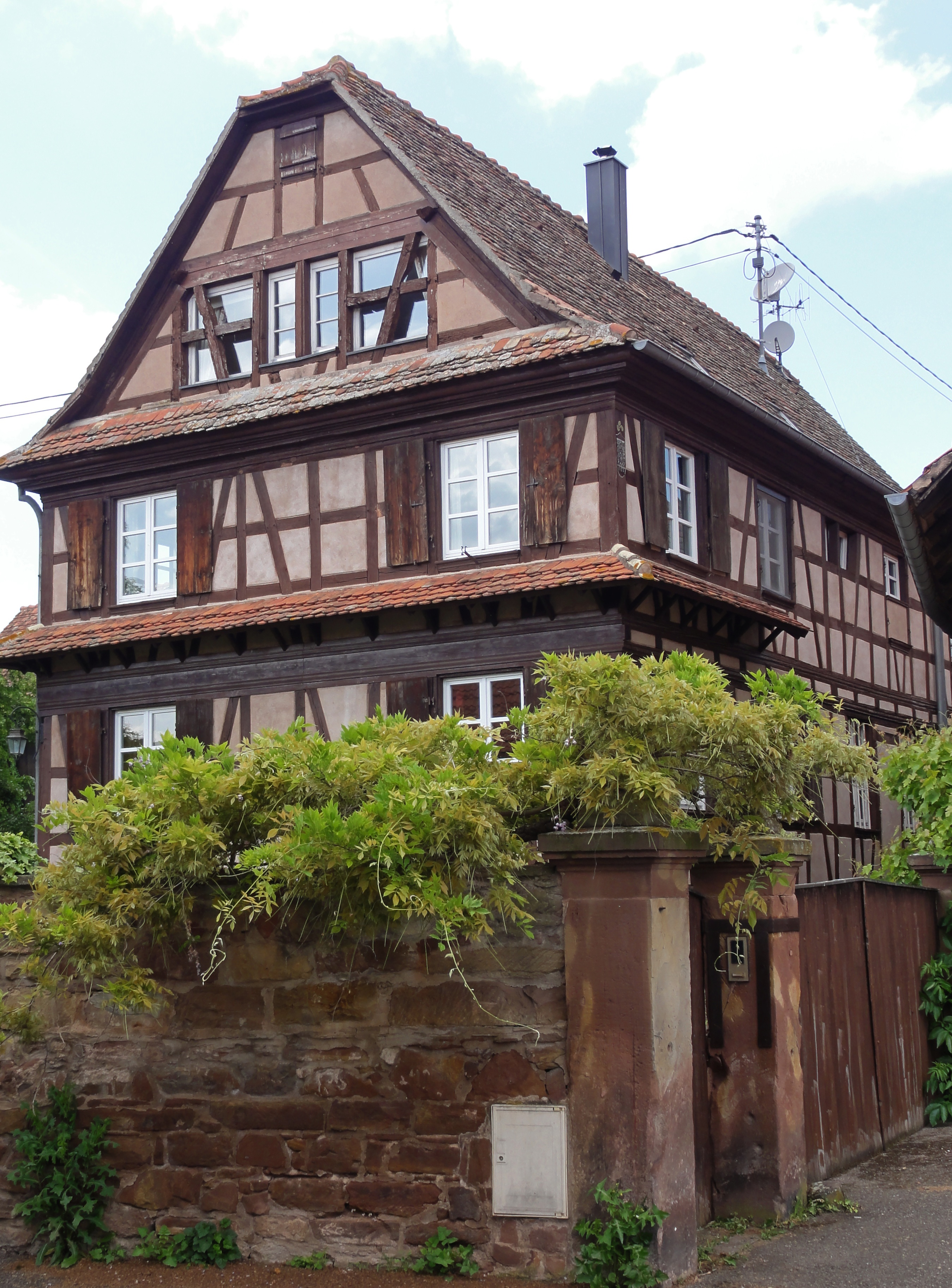

== See also ==
- Communes of the Bas-Rhin department
