= Strasbourg Airport =

International airport serving Strasbourg, France

Strasbourg Airport Aéroport de Strasbourg
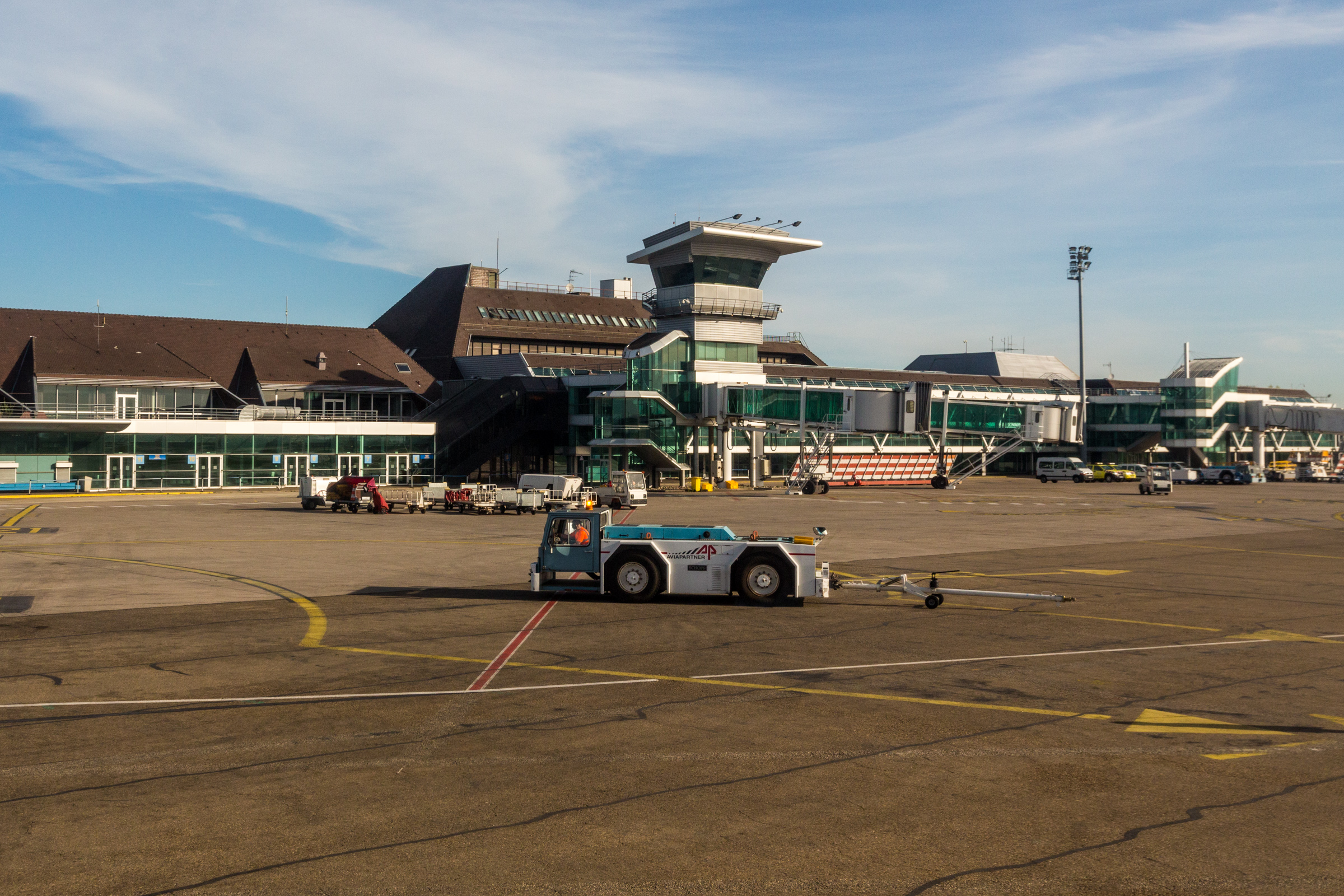
- IATA: SXB; ICAO: LFST

Summary
- Airport type: Public
- Serves: Strasbourg, France
- Location: Entzheim
- Opened: February 1923; 103 years ago
- Elevation AMSL: 505 ft (154 m)
- Coordinates: 48°32′31″N 07°38′04″E
- Website: strasbourg.aeroport.fr

Map
- Location of airport in Alsace LFST (France)

Runways
Direction	Length		Surface
Direction	m	ft	Surface
05/23	2,400	7,874	Asphalt

Statistics (2018)
- Passengers: 1,297,177
- Passenger traffic change: ▲7.4%
- Source: French AIP, Aeroport.fr

Strasbourg Airport (French: Aéroport de Strasbourg; German: Flughafen Straßburg; Alsatian: D'r Strossburi(g) Flughàfa) (IATA: SXB, ICAO: LFST) is a minor international airport located in Entzheim, 10 km (6.2 miles) west-southwest of Strasbourg, both communes of the Bas-Rhin département in the Alsace région of France. In 2025, the airport served 1,308,984 passengers.

== History ==
There was a decline in traffic after Ryanair suspended service in 2004 after a court declared that the airline had received illegal subsidies from the airport.

After the opening of the first phase of the new LGV Est high-speed rail line from Paris to Strasbourg, there was a significant reduction in plane usage, but since 2011, traffic at the airport has grown. However, Air France ceased to operate the route between Strasbourg and Paris-Charles de Gaulle on 2 April 2013, transferring passengers onto rail services operated as tgvair. The opening of the second phase of the LGV Est in July 2016 further reduced travel time to Paris to 1:48 by train.

== Facilities ==
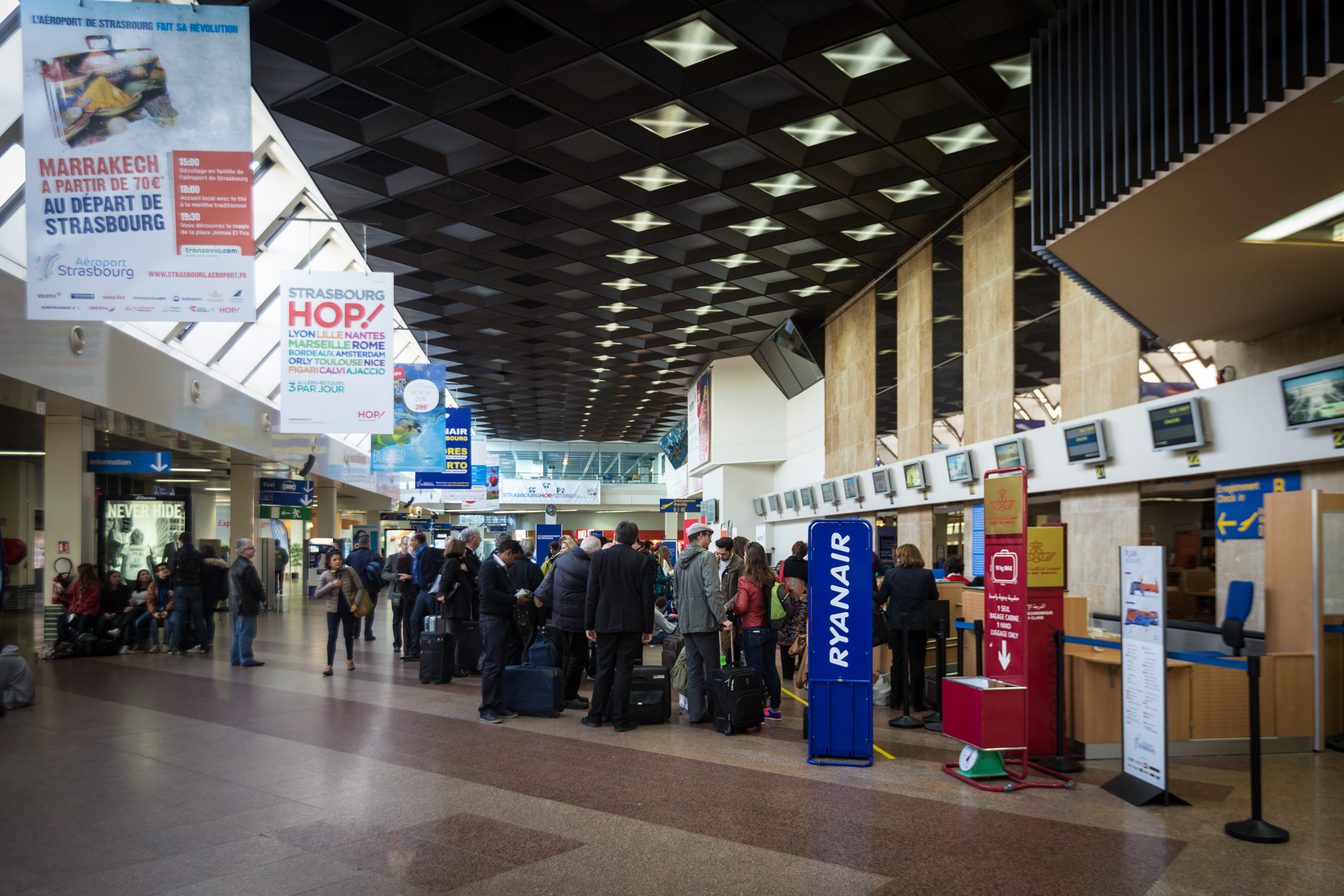
Check-in hall

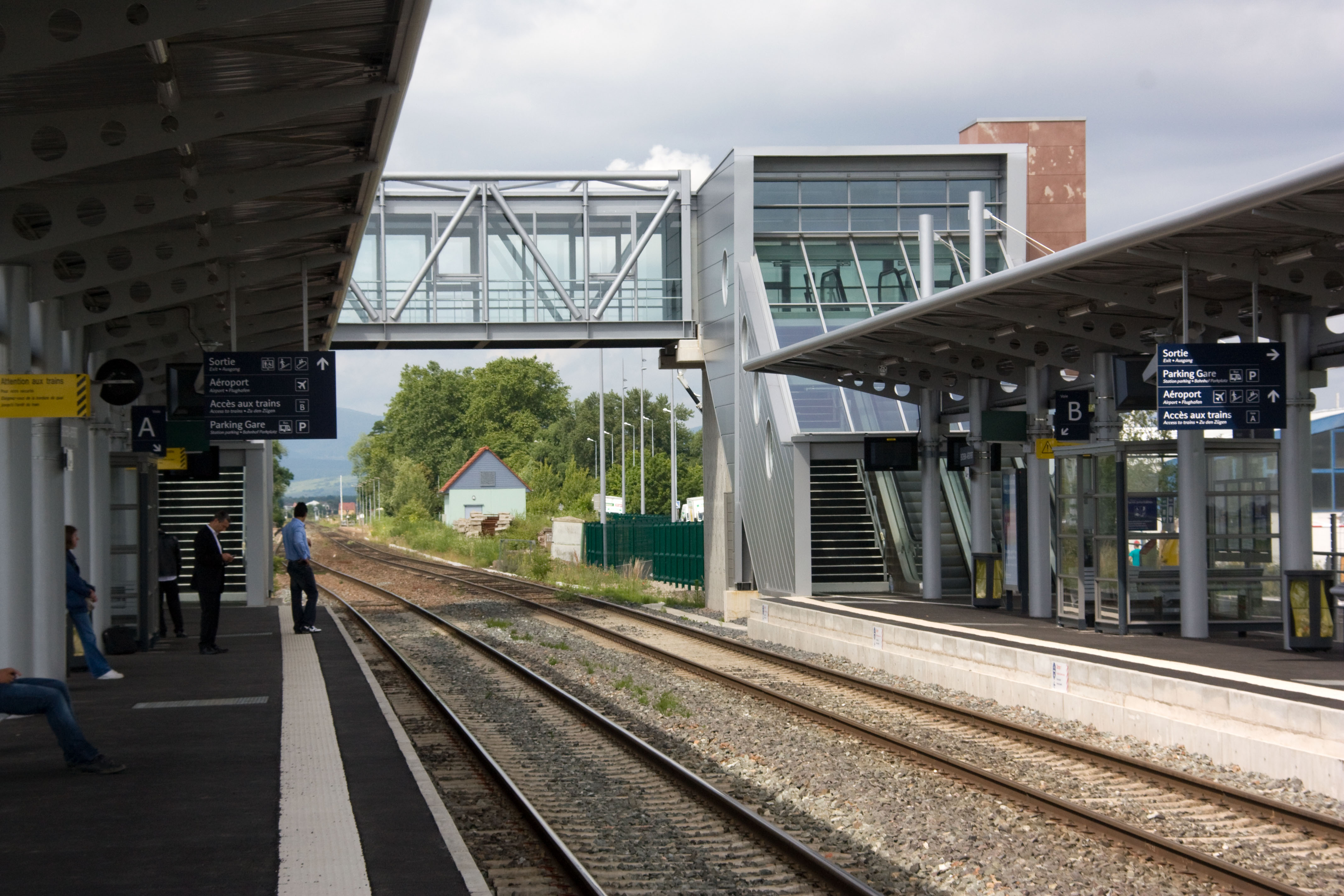
The Entzheim-Aéroport train station

The airport consists of a single two-storey passenger terminal building. The ground floor features the check-in areas as well as the arrivals facilities with three baggage claim belts. The upper floor contains the international and domestic departure lounges and gates. The terminal is equipped with four gates that have jet-bridges as well as some walk-boarding stands.

== Airlines and destinations ==
The following airlines operate regular scheduled and charter flights at Strasbourg Airport:

Airlines	Destinations
Aegean Airlines	Athens
Air Algérie	Algiers
AnimaWings	Bucharest
ASL Airlines France	Seasonal: Oujda
easyJet	Barcelona, London–Gatwick, Marrakesh, Milan–Malpensa, Naples, Nice, Seasonal: London-Luton (begins 29 November 2026), Manchester, Palma de Mallorca, Rome–Fiumicino
Iberia	Madrid; Seasonal: Barcelona, Bilbao (begins 1 December 2026)
Jet2.com	Seasonal: Edinburgh (begins 27 November 2026), London–Stansted (begins 26 November 2026), Manchester (begins 26 November 2026)
LOT Polish Airlines	Seasonal: Warsaw–Chopin
Lufthansa	Frankfurt
Nouvelair	Tunis; Seasonal: Djerba
Royal Air Maroc	Casablanca
TAROM	Bucharest
Transavia	Algiers; Seasonal: Constantine
Tunisair	Tunis
Twin Jet	Lyon
Volotea	Barcelona, Bordeaux, Copenhagen, Marseille, Montpellier, Munich, Nantes, Nice, Rome–Fiumicino, Toulouse; Seasonal: Agadir, Ajaccio, Athens, Bastia, Brest, Calvi, Faro, Figari, Florence (begins 23 September 2026), Gran Canaria, Heraklion, Lanzarote, Málaga, Marrakesh, Olbia, Palermo, Palma de Mallorca, Porto, Rodez
Vueling	Barcelona

The nearest larger international airports are EuroAirport Basel Mulhouse Freiburg, located 154 km (96 mi) south and Stuttgart Airport, located 168 km (104 mi) north east of Strasbourg Airport.

== Entzheim-Aéroport station ==
Entzheim-Aéroport
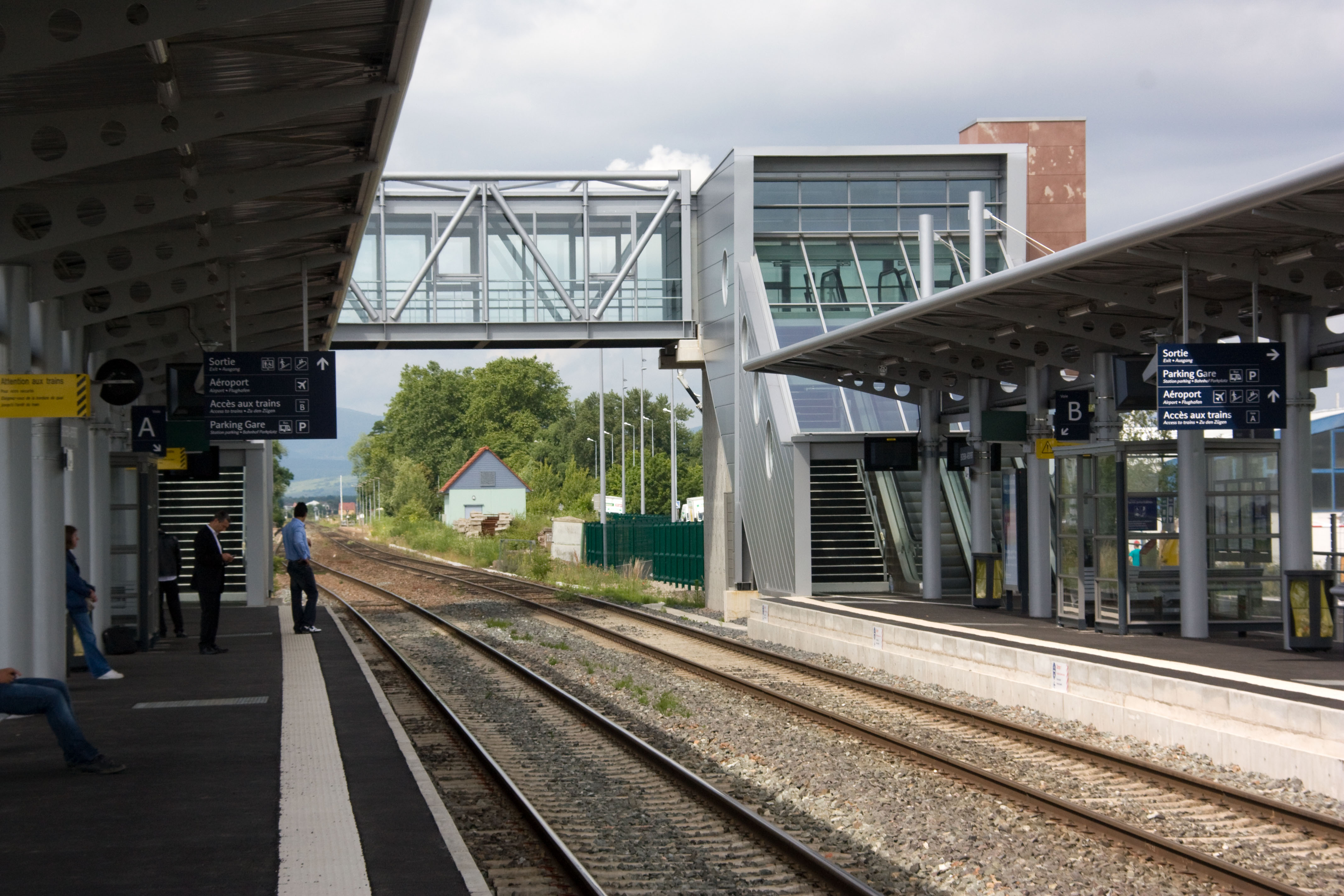
- Entzheim-Aéroport train station

General information
- Location: 12 Allée de l'Europe 67960 Entzheim; France
Lines
Preceding station	TER Grand Est	Following station
Lingolsheim towards Strasbourg	A07	Duppigheim towards Sélestat
Duppigheim towards Molsheim	A18	Lingolsheim towards Strasbourg
Location

The airport and community of Entzheim is served by the Entzheim-Aéroport station, on the line from Strasbourg to Molsheim. It is serviced by TER Grand Est trains towards Strasbourg's central station, as well as the communes of Barr, Molsheim, Rothau, and Sélestat. The trip to Strasbourg-Ville station takes 7 to 12 minutes.

The station is served by the CTS buses 42, 43, and 44, connecting to other areas in Entzheim. There are no direct connections to Strasbourg via bus, or to the Strasbourg tramway.

== Accidents and incidents ==
- Air Inter Flight 148, a flight inbound from Lyon, France, struck a mountain side near Mont Sainte-Odile on 20 January 1992 on descent during the final leg of the approach for Strasbourg's runway 05, killing 87 people.
