= Airbus Industrie Flight 129 =

1994 aviation accident

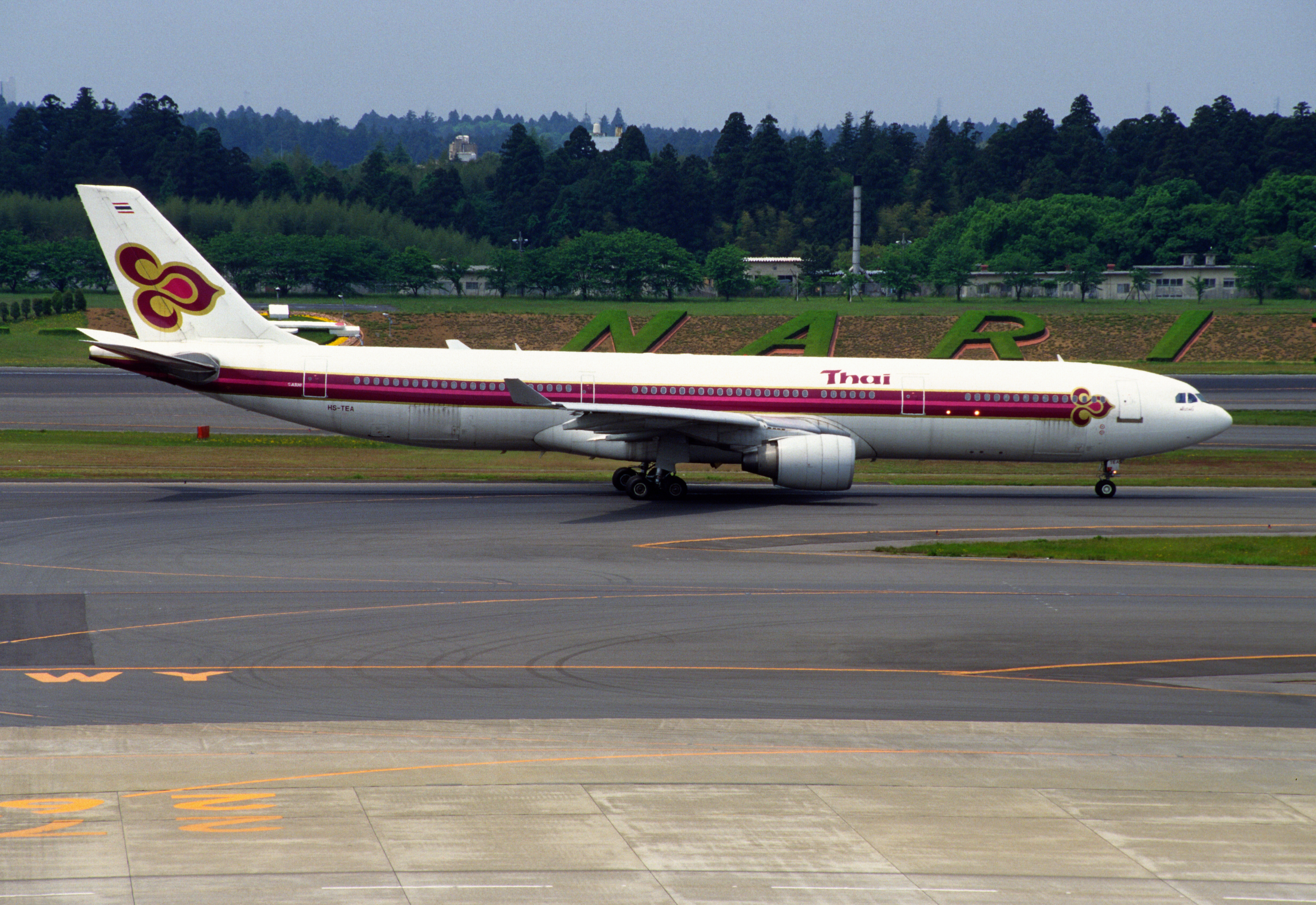
- A Thai Airways International Airbus A330-300, similar to the one involved in the accident

Accident
- Date: 30 June 1994
- Summary: Pilot error leading to loss of control
- Site: Toulouse–Blagnac Airport, Blagnac, France; 43°38′6″N 1°21′30″E

Aircraft
- Aircraft type: Airbus A330-321
- Operator: Airbus Industrie due for delivery to Thai Airways International
- Call sign: WHISKEY WHISKEY KILO HOTEL
- Registration: F-WWKH
- Flight origin: Toulouse–Blagnac Airport
- Destination: Toulouse–Blagnac Airport
- Occupants: 7
- Passengers: 4
- Crew: 3
- Fatalities: 7
- Survivors: 0

Airbus Industrie Flight 129 was a test flight of an Airbus Industrie Airbus A330 that ended in a crash on 30 June 1994 at Toulouse–Blagnac Airport, killing all seven people aboard. The last test flown was to certify the plane's takeoff capability with a single engine failure. It was the first fatal accident involving an Airbus A330 as well as the first hull loss of the type.

== Aircraft ==
The aircraft involved in the accident was an Airbus A330-321, registration F-WWKH, c/n 42. Equipped with twin Pratt & Whitney PW4164 powerplants, it first flew on 14 October 1993. The aircraft was 259 days old at the time of the accident. The aircraft belonged to Thai Airways International and was being flight-tested under agreement with the owner. Airbus Industrie already owed Thai Airways compensation for the hull loss of another plane it had damaged during testing in December 1993.

== Test objectives ==
The objective of the flight was to test the performance of the aircraft in simulated engine failures after takeoff, which meant throttling down one of the aircraft's engines to idle and switching off a hydraulic circuit. During most of the tests, the aircraft's autopilot would be set to fly the plane to an altitude of 2,000 feet (610 m). The particular test that led to the crash flew in a configuration with the plane's center of gravity near its aft limit, achieved by carrying tons of water in bladders in the rear of the aircraft's cabin.

The captain was the Airbus chief test pilot, American Nick Warner. The co-pilot was Michel Cais, an Air Inter training captain who had been working with the Airbus training organization Aeroformation. A flight test engineer, Jean-Pierre Petit, was on board as the third member of the crew.

Airbus management was interested in promoting the plane to potential customers, and did not perceive the test to be hazardous, so they invited four passengers on the plane: two Airbus executives (Philippe Tournoux and Keith Hulse), and two Alitalia pilots, Alberto Nassetti and Pier Paolo Racchetti, who were in Toulouse for a commercial training programme at the Airbus headquarters.

== Crash ==
The aircraft had just successfully completed a landing, after the captain had performed two simulated engine loss go-arounds, taking a total of 55 minutes. The second takeoff would be made with the aircraft's center of gravity located in an extreme aft position. This time the aircraft was flown by the co-pilot, while the actions to shut off the engine and hydraulic circuit, and engage the autopilot, were carried out by the captain. The takeoff was completed successfully and the captain shut off the engine and hydraulic circuit. Three attempts were needed to engage the autopilot and the aircraft started to ascend to 2,000 feet (610 m). The aircraft climbed too steeply, decreasing airspeed to 100 knots (120 mph; 190 km/h), below the minimum 118 knots (219 km/h; 136 mph) required to maintain control. The aircraft started to roll, so the crew reduced power on the operating engine to counter the thrust asymmetry. This exacerbated the problem and the aircraft pitched down 15 degrees and soon after crashed into the ground. All seven people on board were killed, and the aircraft was written off.

== Investigation ==
The crash was investigated by a commission of enquiry within the Direction Générale de l'Armement (DGA), the French Government Defense procurement and technology agency responsible for investigating flight test accidents. The commission found the crash was due to "a combination of several factors, no one of which, in isolation, would have caused the crash." These included:

- Captain Warner's fatigue after a "punishingly busy day" which had included an A321 demonstration flight, supervision of a simulator session, and two meetings, including a press briefing;
- Lack of a complete pre-flight briefing, caused by Warner's schedule, and possible complacency caused by success of the testing through the previous takeoff;
- Choice of maximum takeoff/go-around (TOGA) thrust rather than the slightly lower "Flex 49" setting, which caused higher than planned thrust asymmetry during the simulated left engine failure;
- Choice of trim setting at 2.2° nose-up; although within acceptable limits, this was inappropriate for the extreme aft CG configuration flown.
- Autopilot inadvertently left set at 2,000 feet (610 m) altitude capture from the previous test;
- Absence of attitude protection in the autopilot's altitude capture mode;
- Uncertainty in allocation of tasks between the captain and co-pilot; the co-pilot rotated the aircraft "firmly and very fast" to a takeoff attitude of more than 25°, compared with the usual 14.5° used for the first, successful takeoff;
- The captain simulated an engine failure immediately after takeoff: autopilot engage, throttling back the left engine, and tripping the hydraulic circuit breaker; this took him temporarily "out of the piloting loop."
- Lack of visual indication of autopilot mode, obscured by the extreme pitch attitude;
- Crew overconfidence in expected aircraft response;
- Delayed reaction of the test engineer to changes in flight parameters, particularly airspeed;
- Captain's slowness in reacting to the development of an abnormal situation.

== See also ==
- List of accidents and incidents involving commercial aircraft
