= Marc Chervel =

French economist (1932–2004)

Marc Chervel, born 1 November 1932 in Lille (North), died 25 December 2004 in Beaumont-les-Nonains (Oise), was a development economist.

== Biography ==
Marc Chervel spent his childhood in Aix-en-Provence. He integrated École Polytechnique in 1952 (Class X 1952).

Volunteered to be part of an SAS (specialized administrative section) during the Algerian War, and was appointed Captain (land), he denounces the use of Torture during the Algerian War before being questioned by military security and returned after the Algiers putsch, 13 May 1958.

In 1960, he has led the team that works for the Ministry of Cooperation on project evaluation and development of national development program (method effects). This method provides an approach to economic calculation and programming development alternative to the World Bank.

He worked for over thirty years of development economics: national planning and research projects in developing countries.

He has taught many lessons on methods of evaluating projects in universities and colleges in France and in over thirty five countries. He is the author of numerous books on these issues and particularly on the effects method.

His son is the journalist and co-founder of Perlentaucher, Thierry Chervel.
