= Yves Poilane =

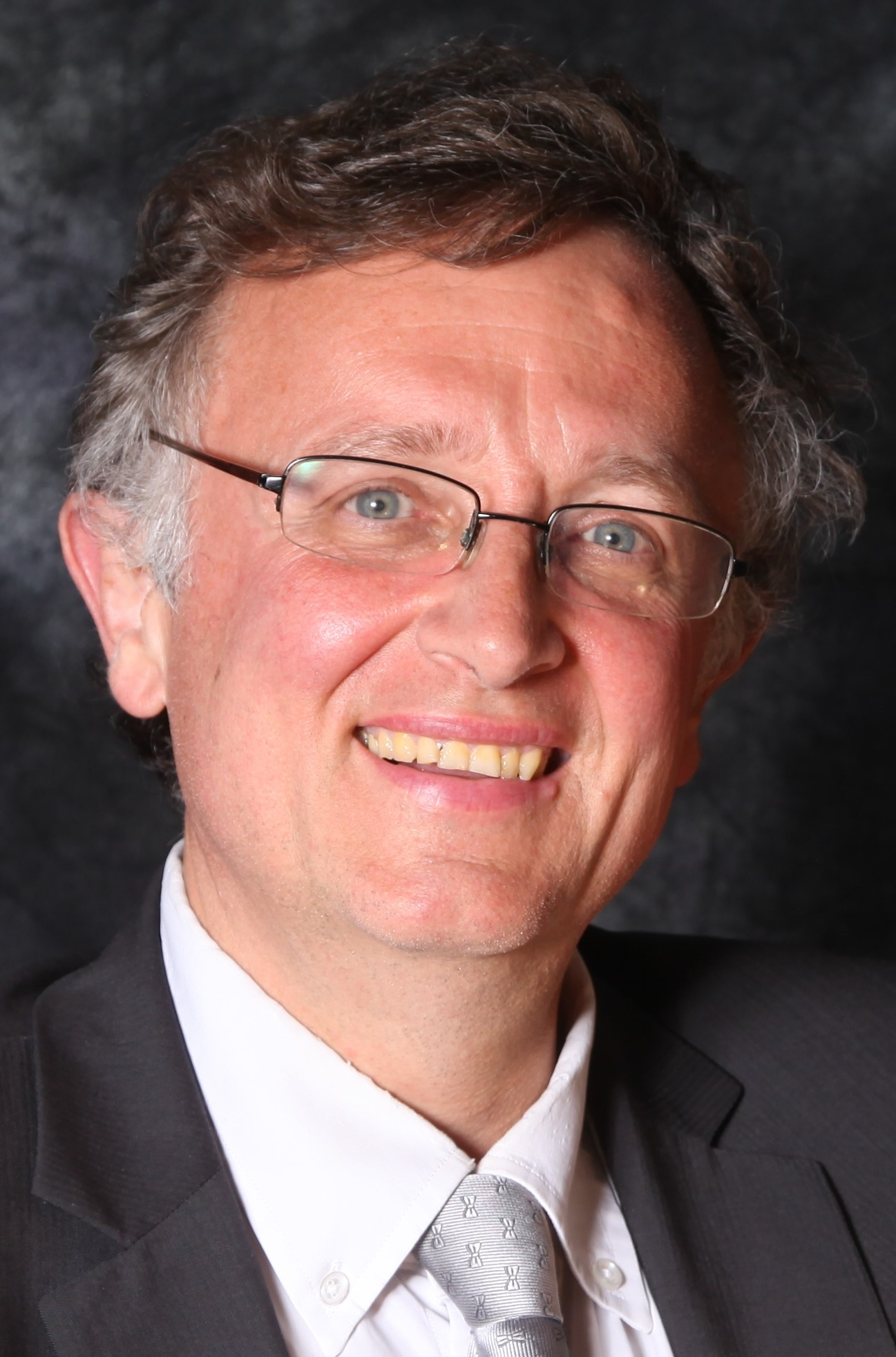
- Born: 11th of December 1959; Lyon
- Citizenship: French
- Education: Master's degree
- Alma mater: École Polytechnique; Télécom Paris
- Years active: 1979-2023
- Known for: Director General of IONIS Education Group
- Successor: Philippe Jamet

Yves Poilane, born 11 December 1959 in Lyon (France), is a former director of Télécom Paris and former director of the technological department of the IONIS Education Group.

== Biography ==
Graduate of the Ecole Polytechnique (1979), he also graduated from the Télécom Paris and joined the Corps des télécommunications, where he was appointed chief engineer in 1993 and general engineer on 1 January 2003, barely 43 years old.

He will first hold positions of technical responsibility in the general direction of telecommunications (which will become in 1996 the company France Télécom). From 1984 to 1989, he managed telephone equipment in Franche-Comté, then operations in Provence-Alpes-Côte d'Azur.

In 1989, he was appointed deputy director of the École nationale supérieure des télécommunications de Bretagne (ENSTB).

In 1994, he was appointed national manager of the master plan for the development of telephone lines in General Management services. He took care of the evolution of the lines (from 1994 to 1996) then the orientations of the local loop (1996 to 1997).

In 1997, he was appointed director of the Professional Agency of Boulogne-Billancourt. He then became regional director of distribution in Picardy in 2001. Because of his specialty concerning the distribution of television on ADSL, he was called to Paris in 2004 to take over the management of the business unit MaLigne TV (which will become Orange TV).

In 2007, he received responsibility for the territorial management of operations in Ile de France, which he only kept briefly, since the same year he was appointed director of the Télécom Paris in Paris.

In December 2019, Yves Poilane left the management of Télécom Paris to take over the management of the technological department of the IONIS Education Group. He retired in December 2023, replaced by Philippe Jamet.
