= Bassam Fayad =

French mathematician

- Fayad in 2025
- Education: École polytechnique
- Occupation: Mathematician

Bassam Fayad is a French mathematician. A recipient of the National Order of the Cedar, he is the Michael and Eugenia Brin Endowed Chair Professor in the department of mathematics at the University of Maryland, College Park.
