= Abdourahmane Cissé =

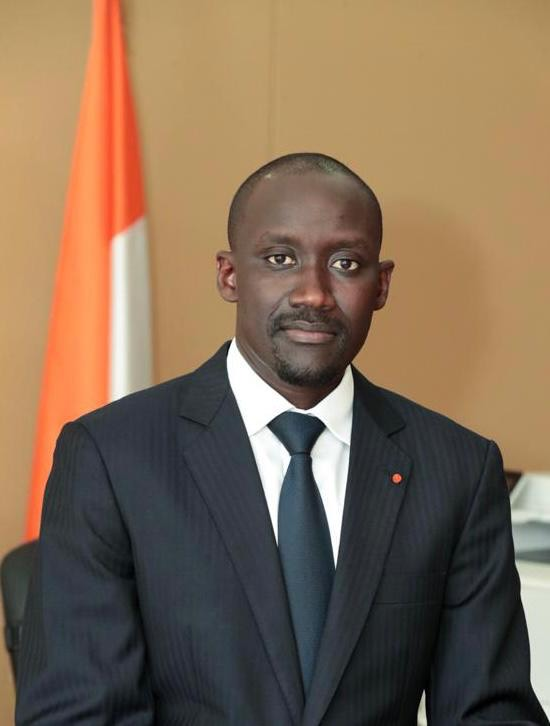
- Abdourahmane Cissé former General Secretary of the Ivorian Presidency in 2022

Budget Minister of Ivory Coast

Personal details
- Born: August 6, 1981 (age 44) Abidjan, Ivory Coast
- Education: École polytechnique; French Institute of Petroleum
- Occupation: Minister, Engineer, Trader

Abdourahmane Cissé (born August 6, 1981, in Abidjan, Ivory Coast) is an Ivorian politician, engineer and economist. He was previously Secretary General of the Presidency, Petroleum, Energy and Renewable Energies Minister of Ivory Coast under Prime Minister Hamed Bakayoko and Budget Minister of Ivory Coast under Prime Minister Daniel Kablan Duncan.

A graduate engineer from the Ecole Polytechnique de Paris (France, X 2001) and the Institut Français du Petrole, his appointment on November 19, 2013, at 32 years old, made him the youngest Minister in Prime Minister Daniel Kablan Duncan's government.

As an awardee of the Young Global Leaders Class of 2017, he's part of 100, under the age of 40, who seek solutions to unsolved problems.

== Biography ==
=== Early life and studies ===
Abdourahmane Cissé was born in Abidjan, in the working-class neighborhood of Treichville. His father was a construction worker and his mother was a housewife. He is the youngest of four children, all of whom work in finance.

He did all his studies until his baccalaureate in Ivory Coast. He attended elementary school in Vridi Collectif, then middle school in Port-Boüet and finally the Lycée Moderne de Grand-Bassam (Ivory Coast). In 1999, he obtained the baccalaureate "C" series with honors. At the age of 18, he moved to Paris and passed the entrance exam to the Ecole Polytechnique de Paris (X 2001). As a foreign student, he joined the 2001 class of this school from which he graduated in 2004 with an engineering degree for Applied Mathematics.

In 2005, he joined the Institut Français du Petrole (IFP School) where he joined the joint program with the University of Oklahoma (United States). This resulted in his earning a master's degree in Economic Science and Petroleum Resources Management.

=== Career ===
His 2005 recruitment by Goldman Sachs International business bank in London gave Cissé exposure to international finance. He performed as a structuration-origination analyst within the Raw Materials department; an associate-trader for structured products; and a VP/Executive Director in charge of volatility trading and dividends pertaining to Eurozone indices. In London, he met Téné Birahima Ouattara, younger brother of Alassane Ouattara. He left Goldman Sachs International in 2011 and went back to Ivory Coast, thereby answering President Alassane Ouattara's call for the return of the Ivorian diaspora.

In July 2012, Abdourahmane Cissé became Advisor to the Ivory Coast President, in charge of to Public Finances.

Six months later, in January 2013, he became Deputy Minister to the Minister in charge of the Economy and Public Finances.

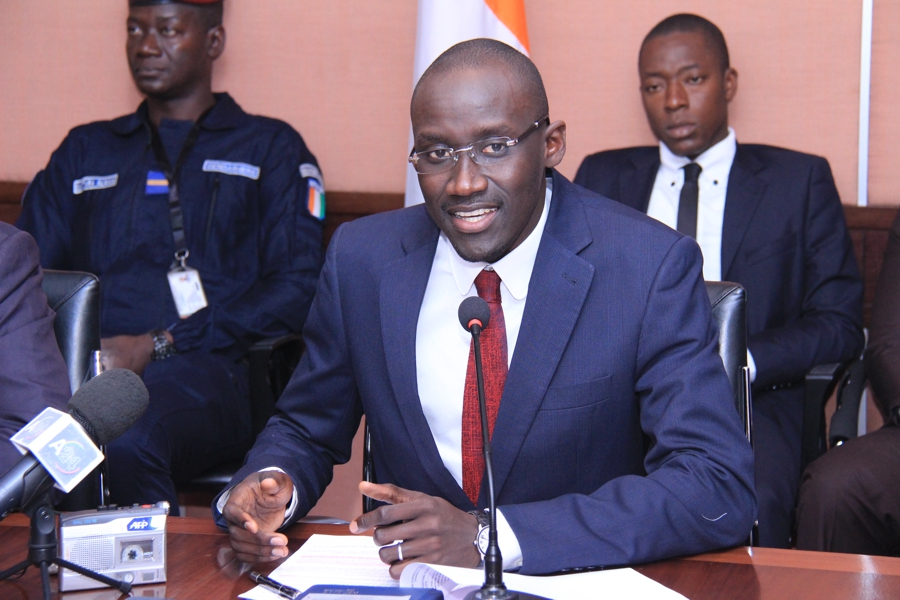
Conférence 16 July 2015 in Abidjan

On November 19, 2013, he was appointed Minister in charge of the Budget and the State Portfolio, becoming the youngest minister in Daniel Kablan Duncan's government. In this capacity, he oversees the drafting and execution of the State Budget; directs the implementation of the Government's budget, customs and fiscal policy; and manages State participations and Public Enterprises. He also contributes to the identification and management of the country's economic policy and debt guiding priorities. As such, and under the guidance of Prime Minister Daniel Kablan Duncan, he drives a vast program of reforms aimed at improving the management of public finances. This includes such initiatives as the electronic land register (LIFE), the new decree governing procurement timelines, the creation of two test centers dedicated to the management of medium-sized businesses (CME), the launching of mixed fiscal and customs controls; as well as the linking of the Tax Office and Customs Department that allowed for the reclassification of certain taxpayers and put an end to the manual registration of taxpayer identification numbers at the Customs Department.

On January 11, 2017, he became the Minister for the Budget and the State Portfolio. He then joined the Ivorian Public Administration as Minister of Budget and State Portfolio from 2013 to 2017 then Special Advisor to the President of the Republic in charge of Economic and Financial Affairs.

He was appointed on December 10, 2018, Minister of Petroleum, Energy and Renewable Energies.

In March 2021, Abdourahmane Cissé was appointed Secretary General of the Presidency. He replaces Patrick Achi, appointed Prime Minister shortly before.

=== International development ===
Since June 2015, Mr Abdourahmane Cisse is a member of the Board of Directors of the Islamic Corporation for the Development of the Private Sector (ICD) representing Africa.

In March 2017, the World Economic Forum ranked him among the 100 Young Global Leaders ("Young Global Leader 2017") under the age of 40, working in the public or private sector.

== Key biographical dates ==
- Since March 2021: Secretary General of the Presidency;
- 2018 - 2021: Minister of Petroleum, Energy and Renewable Energies;
- 2013 - 2017: Ivory Coast Budget Minister;
- January 2013 - November 2013: Cabinet director to the Minister in charge of the Economy and Public Finances;
- July 2012 - December 2012: Advisor to the President with regard to Public Finances;
- 2009 - November 2011: VP/Executive Director in charge of volatility trading and dividends pertaining to Euro zone indices;
- 2007 - 2009: Associate-Trader for structured products;
- 2005: joins Goldman Sachs International (London);
- 2004 - 2005: Master's degree in Economic Science and Petroleum Resources Management. from the Institut Français du Petrole (IFP School);
- 2001 - 2004: Graduate engineer from the Ecole Polytechnique de Paris (France);
- 1999: Baccalaureate with high marks from the Lycee Moderne de Grand-Bassam (Ivory Coast).

== Sources ==
- "Côte d'Ivoire : Abdourahmane Cissé nommé ministre du Budget" [Ivory Coast: Abdourahmane Cissé named Budget Minister]. Jeune Afrique. 19 November 2013.
- Abdourahmane Cissé's busy new Africa-wide role at Lazard bank, Africa Intelligence, 13 March 2025 (requires free registration)
