= Toulouse–Blagnac Airport =

International airport in the Occitanie Region, France

Toulouse Blagnac Airport Aéroport de Toulouse – Blagnac

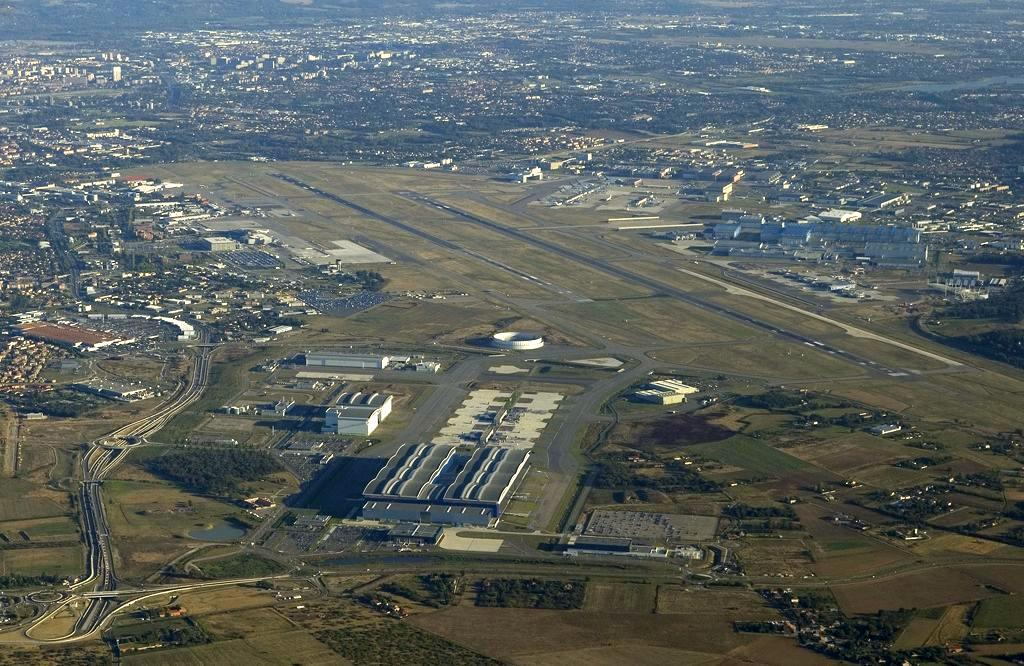
- IATA: TLS; ICAO: LFBO

Summary
- Airport type: Public
- Owner: Eiffage, City of Toulouse
- Operator: Chamber of Commerce and Industry of Toulouse
- Serves: Toulouse Métropole
- Location: Blagnac, Haute-Garonne, France
- Opened: 1 September 1939; 87 years ago
- Hub for: Airbus Industrie
- Focus city for: Air France; easyJet; Ryanair; Volotea
- Elevation AMSL: 497 ft (151 m)
- Coordinates: 43°38′06″N 001°22′04″E
- Website: toulouse.aeroport.fr

Map
- Location of airport in Occitanie region LFBO (France)

Runways
Direction	Length		Surface
Direction	m	ft	Surface
14R/32L	3,503	11,493	Asphalt concrete
14L/32R	3,025	9,925	Asphalt concrete

Statistics (2025)
- Passengers: 7,621,409
- Passenger traffic change: ▼2.8%
- Aircraft movements: 63,388
- Aircraft movements change: ▼4.8%
- Source: French AIP; French AIP at EUROCONTROL<

Toulouse–Blagnac Airport (French: Aéroport de Toulouse–Blagnac; Occitan: Aeroport de Tolosa–Blanhac; IATA: TLS, ICAO: LFBO) is an international airport located 3.6 nautical miles (6.7 km; 4.1 mi) west northwest of Toulouse, partially in Blagnac, both communes of the Haute-Garonne department in the Occitanie region of France. In 2017, the airport served 9,264,611 passengers and in 2024 7.8 million passengers. As of March 2024, the airport featured flights to 84 destinations, mostly in Europe and Northern Africa with a few additional seasonal long-haul connections.

== Facilities ==
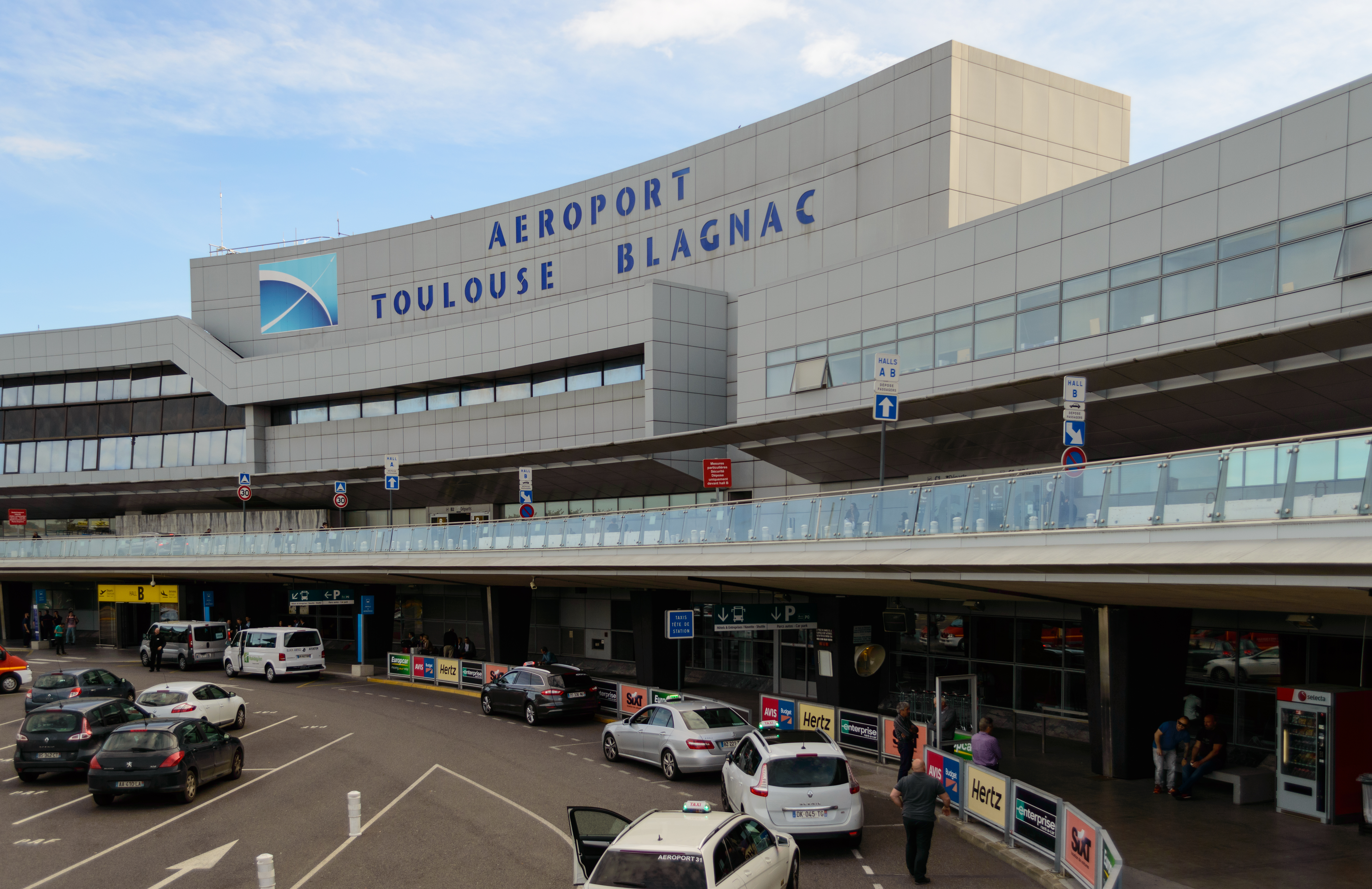
Terminal exterior

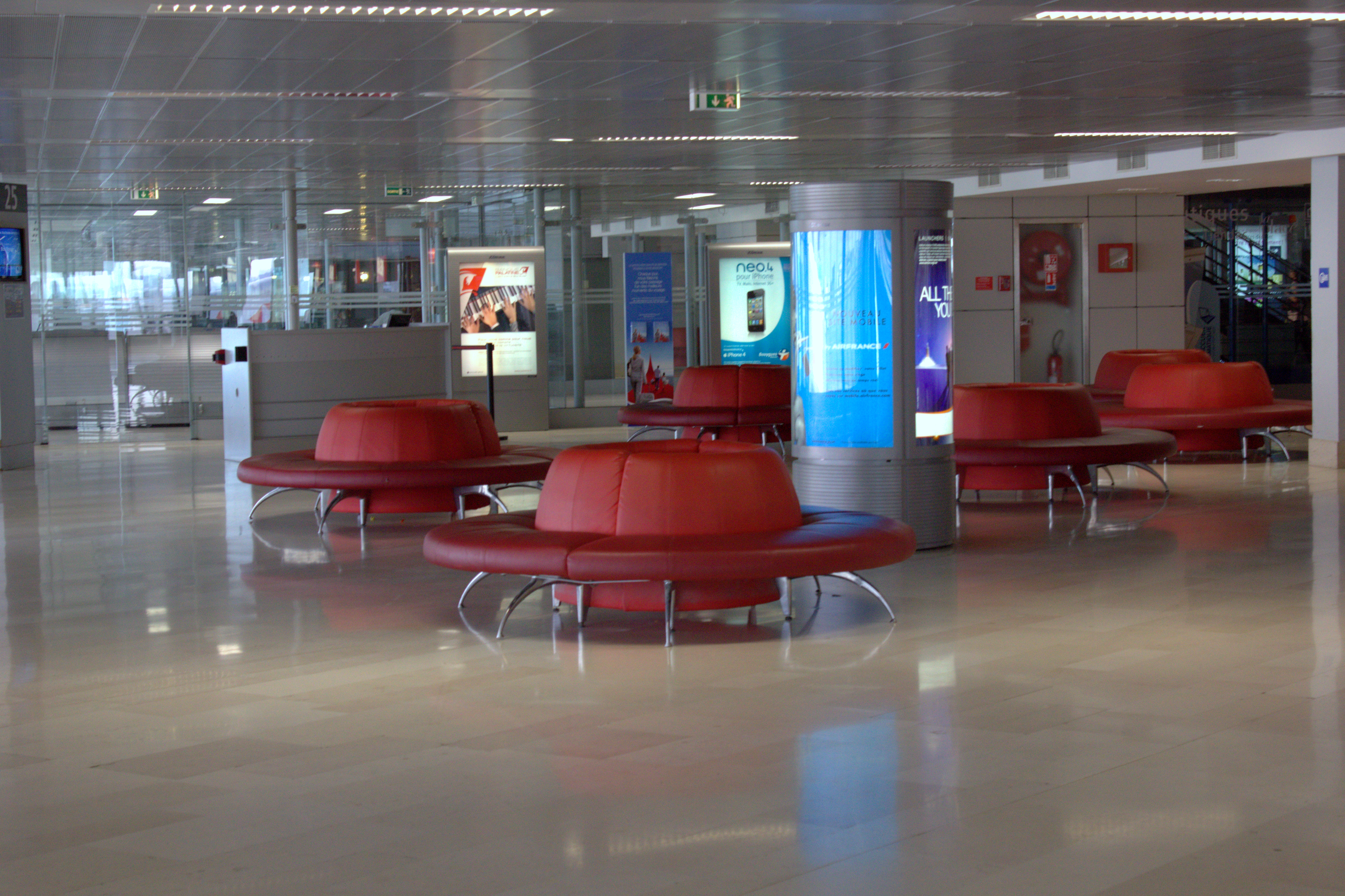
Terminal interior

The airport covers 780 hectares (1,927 acres) of land.

=== Terminal ===
The airport consists of one passenger terminal divided into four halls which provide 68 counters and 34 gates on 100,000-square-metre (1,100,000 sq ft) floor space:

- Hall A features 14 check-in counters and eight aircraft stands for regional aircraft on domestic services.
- Hall B is the oldest area, opened in 1978, and contains 16 check-in counters and 10 gates.
- Hall C is equipped with 24 counters and 6 boarding gates for European destinations.
- Hall D is the newest addition to the airport, opened in 2010, and is used for international and long-haul services with 14 check-in counters and 10 boarding gates.

=== Runways ===
The airport is at an elevation of 499 feet (152 m) above mean sea level. It has two asphalt-paved runways: 14R/32L is 3,503 by 45 metres (11,493 ft × 148 ft) and 14L/32R is 3,025 by 45 metres (9,925 ft × 148 ft).

=== Airbus and ATR facilities ===
Airbus and ATR manufacture aircraft at nearby facilities and test them from the airport. Both utilize runway 32L/14R for flight testing and delivery flights, while runway 32R/14L is used by commercial flights coming in to Toulouse. Airbus also uses this runway for formation flights. Also, the Airbus Delivery Center is on the runway 32L/14R side.

== Ownership ==
Toulouse–Blagnac Airport SA is a limited liability company; the share capital is €148,000 and it has authority to operate the airport until 2046 under a franchise agreement awarded by the French government. The current CEO is Philippe Crébassa.

== Airlines and destinations ==
=== Passenger ===
The following airlines operate regular scheduled and charter flights to and from Toulouse:

Airlines	Destinations
Aegean Airlines	Seasonal: Athens, Heraklion
Aer Lingus	Dublin
Air Algérie	Algiers, Constantine, Oran
Air Arabia	Fès
Air Canada	Montréal–Trudeau
Air Corsica	Ajaccio, Bastia, Calvi, Figari, Nantes
Air France	Amsterdam, Lyon, Paris–Charles de Gaulle
Air Transat	Seasonal: Montréal–Trudeau
APG Airlines	Lorient
British Airways	London–Heathrow
Brussels Airlines	Brussels
Corsair International	Saint-Denis de la Réunion
easyJet	Basel/Mulhouse, Bristol, Geneva, London–Gatwick, Lyon, Marrakesh, Milan–Malpensa, Nantes, Nice, Paris–Orly; Seasonal: Palma de Mallorca
Iberia	Madrid
KLM	Amsterdam
Lufthansa	Munich
Norwegian Air Shuttle	Seasonal: Copenhagen, Oslo
Nouvelair	Djerba, Tunis
Royal Air Maroc	Casablanca, Marrakesh
Ryanair	Agadir, Alicante, Bristol, Budapest, Brussels-Charleroi, Dublin, Fès, Kraków, Lisbon, London–Stansted, Malta, Manchester, Marrakesh, Milan-Bergamo, Oujda, Paphos, Porto, Rabat, Rome–Fiumicino, Seville, Tangier, Tenerife–South, Valencia, Venice-Treviso; Seasonal: Bari, Birmingham, Corfu, Edinburgh, Faro, Ibiza, Menorca, Nador, Naples, Palma de Mallorca
Smartwings	Prague
Swiss International Air Lines	Seasonal: Zurich (resumes 25 June 2027)
TAP Air Portugal	Lisbon
Transavia	Agadir, Algiers, Boa Vista, Brest, Dakar, Jeddah, Marrakesh, Medina, Oran, Paris–Orly, Sal, Tel Aviv
Tunisair	Tunis
Turkish Airlines	Istanbul
Twin Jet	Nantes, Marseille, Nice, Rennes
United Airlines	Washington–Dulles (begins 26 April 2027)
Volotea	Caen, Lille, Nantes, Pisa (resumes 6 November 2026), Rennes, Strasbourg, Tenerife–South, Venice; Seasonal: Faro, Florence, Fuertentura (begins 7 November 2026), Gran Canaria (begins 7 November 2026), Luxembourg, Madrid, Olbia, Palermo, Split

=== Cargo ===
Airlines	Destinations
DHL Aviation	Lyon
FedEx Feeder	Paris–Charles de Gaulle
Maersk Air Cargo	Lyon
Swiftair	Bucharest–Otopeni, Paris–Charles de Gaulle
UPS Airlines	Cologne/Bonn

== Access ==
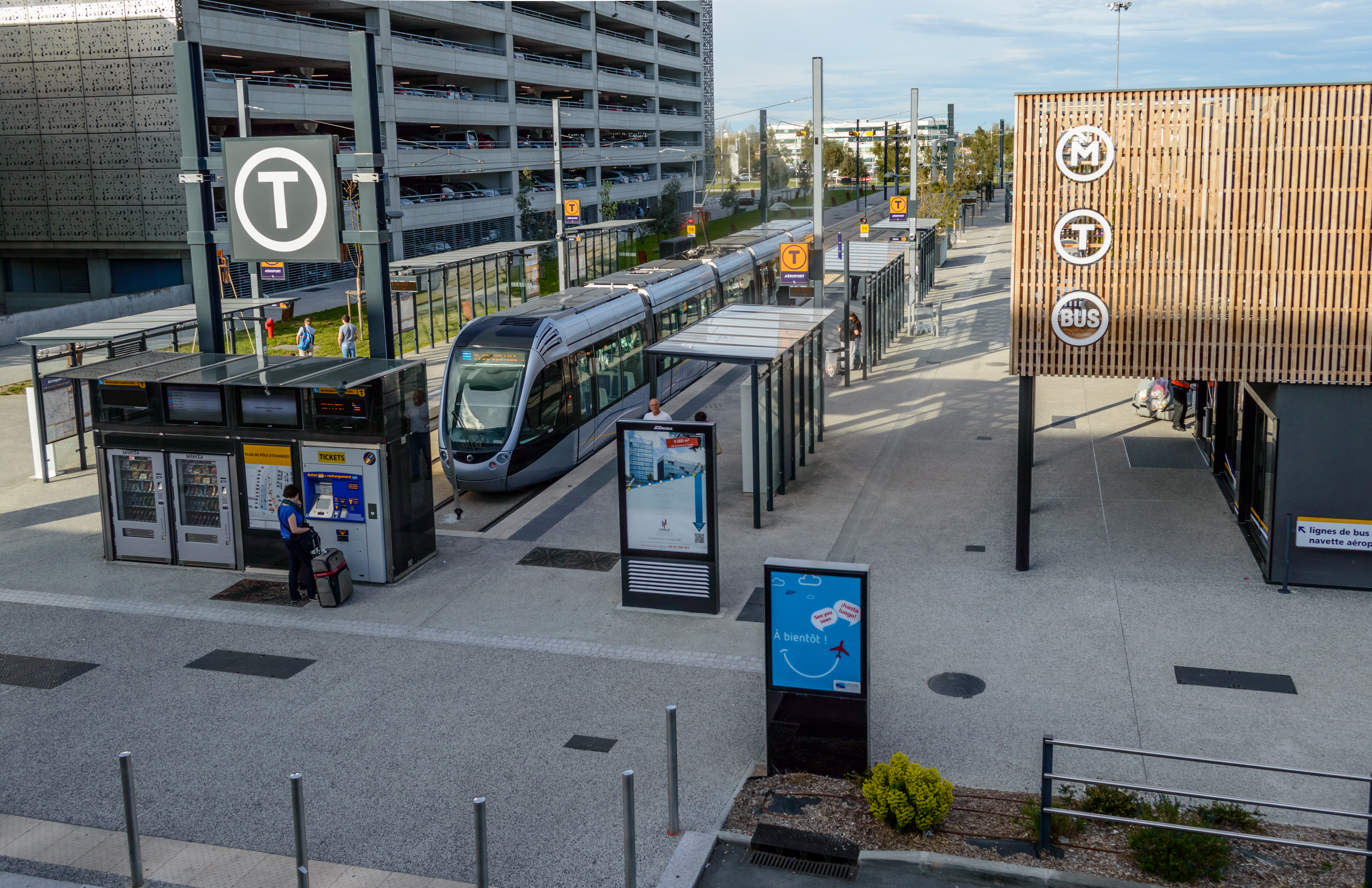
Tram connection to the airport

=== Tram ===
The T2 tram line previously connected Toulouse with the airport every 15 minutes. However it closed in 2023 and will reopen in 2026 as the new Aeroport Express line, using existing infrastructure to provide a shuttle service from the future Blagnac line C metro station to the station of Toulouse Blagnac airport.

=== Bus and coach ===
Shuttle buses to Toulouse city centre stop outside Hall B every 15 minutes. Faster than the tram, they take approximately 20 minutes to reach the city centre, stopping at Compans-Caffarelli and Jeanne d'Arc (both on Metro Line B), Jean Jaurès (Metro Line A and B) and at Toulouse-Matabiau railway station. Three daily coach services connect Toulouse–Blagnac Airport to Andorra, which does not have its own commercial airport.

== Accidents and incidents ==
- On 29 January 1988, Inter Cargo Service Flight 1004, operated by Vickers Vanguard F-GEJF, crashed when takeoff was attempted with only three fully operable engines.
- On 17 June 1988, the prototype ATR 42-200, registered as F-WEGA, crashed shortly after lift off while performing an engine failure test. All three crew members survived.
- On 30 June 1994, an Airbus A330-300 performing a test flight crashed shortly after takeoff, due to a series of mistakes while conducting a flight test simulating an engine failure. All seven people on board died in the accident.
- On 15 November 2007, a brand-new Airbus A340-600 due to be delivered to Etihad Airways ran up and over the top of a concrete sloped blast-deflection wall during an engine test at the Airbus factory at the airport. This was due to the crew not following proper test procedures, raising all four engines to maximum thrust while the wheels were un-chocked. The attempt to steer away from the wall resulted in decreased braking power. Five people were injured and the aircraft was written off.

== See also ==
- List of the busiest airports in France
