= Château d'Andlau =

Medieval ruined castle in Andlau, France

Coordinates: 48°24′05″N 7°24′45″E

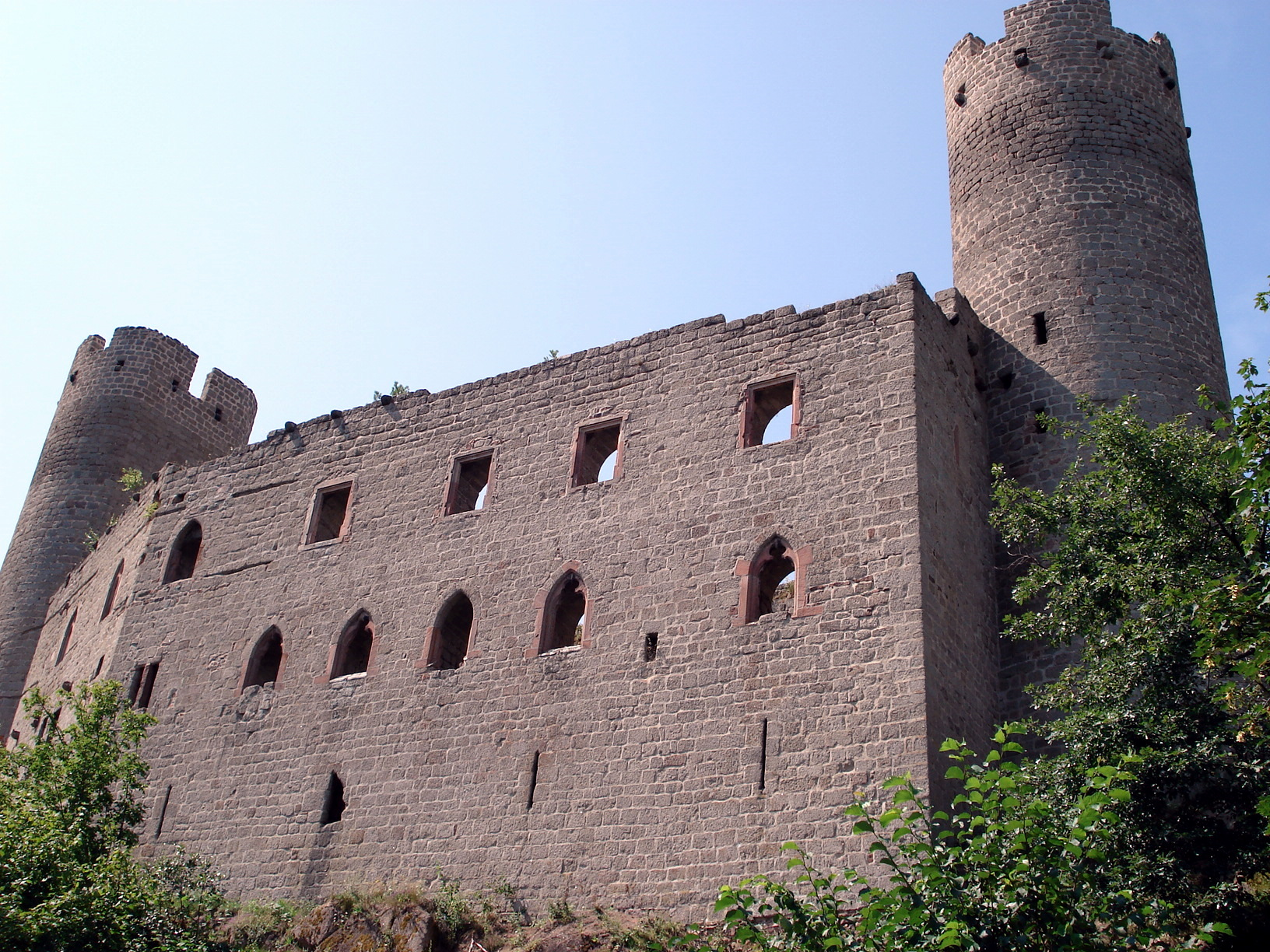
Haut-Andlau

The Château d'Andlau (German: Burg Hoh-Andlau) is a medieval ruined castle in the commune of Andlau, in the Bas-Rhin département of France. It is a recognized historical monument since 1926.

== History ==
Constructed on a narrow granite outcrop at an altitude of 451 m (~1466 ft), the Haut-Andlau dominates the valleys of Andlau and Kirneck. The castle was built from granite blocks, certainly by Eberhard d'Andlau between 1246 and 1264. In 1678, after the annexation of Alsace by France, it was pillaged by the troops of maréchal de Créquy. The castle stayed in the hands of the Counts of Andlau until the French Revolution and served afterwards as a residence for a gamekeeper in the service of the family.

Confiscated as a national asset, it was sold in 1796 to a merchant who, from 1806 and, with no apparent public opposition, began to sell the castle piece by piece. In 1818, Antoine-Henri d'Andlau bought the ruin and saved it from destruction. Repair work was carried out in 1856. The castle was classified as a monument historique (historic monument) in 1926 and was reinforced in 1927-1928 with a restoration campaign launched on the initiative of the Vosges Club (Club Vosgien). It still belongs to the Andlau family.

== The building ==
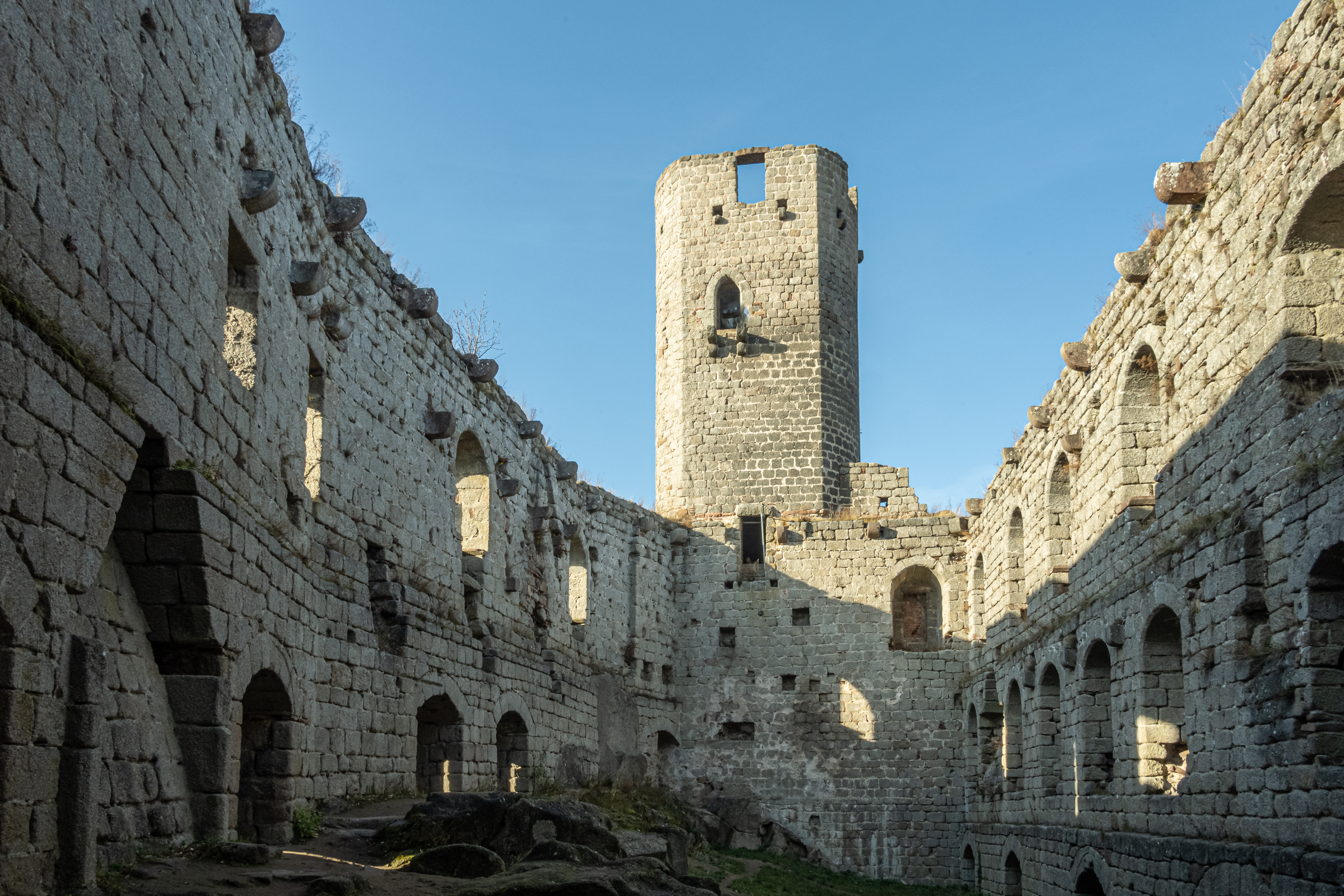
Inner courtyard

The castle is on two levels. The higher part is built on a narrow ridge approximately 25 m wide and 80 m long (~81 by 260 ft), orientated south-south-west to north-north-east. It consists of a long residential building flanked at each end by circular towers about 10 m (~33 ft) in diameter. The castle was built in one piece; only the lower court has been altered (in the 16th century). Like the neighbouring Château du Spesbourg, the building material was granite excavated on site. To the east, a steep mountainside provides a natural defence while on the other sides, a wide, deep moat cut into the rock isolates and protects the site.

== See also ==
- List of castles in France
- Château du Spesbourg
