= Château de Spesbourg =

Ruined castle in Bas-Rhin, France

Coordinates: 48°24′7″N 7°23′50″E

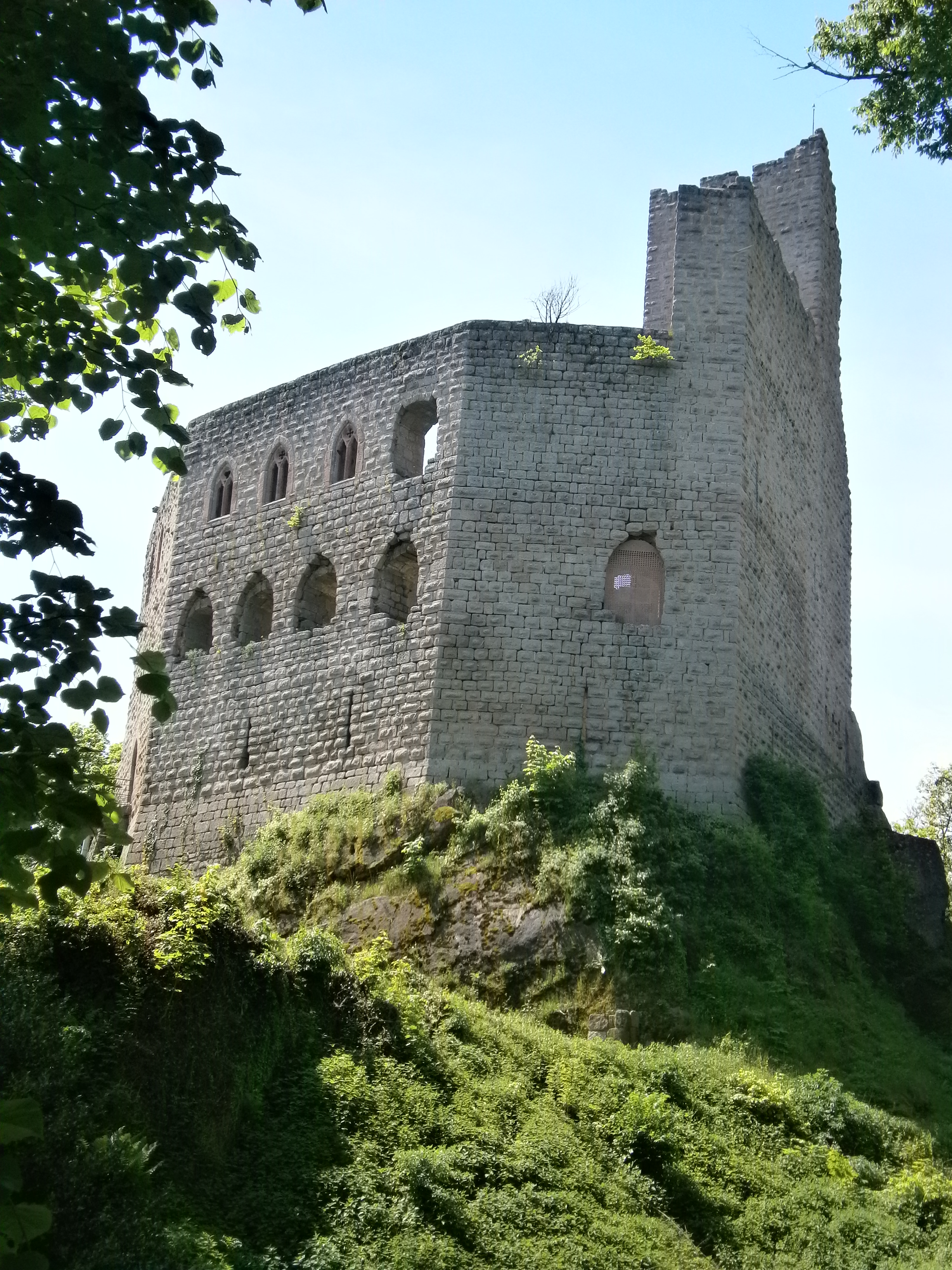
The Château de Spesbourg

The Château de Spesbourg (German: Spesburg) is a ruined castle that dominates the valley above the village of Andlau, in the Bas-Rhin department of France.

The castle was constructed between 1246 and 1250 by Alexander of Stahleck-Dicka, Vogt to Andlau Abbey. In 1386 it became the property of the family von Andlau. In the 16th century angry locals set fire to the castle after one of the lords seduced a village girl.

The castle fell into ruin after the Thirty Years' War.

In 1967 it was registered with the national Inventory of Historic Buildings by the French Ministry of Culture.

== See also ==
- Château d'Andlau
- List of castles in France
