= Ungersberg =

Peak in the Vosges Mountains

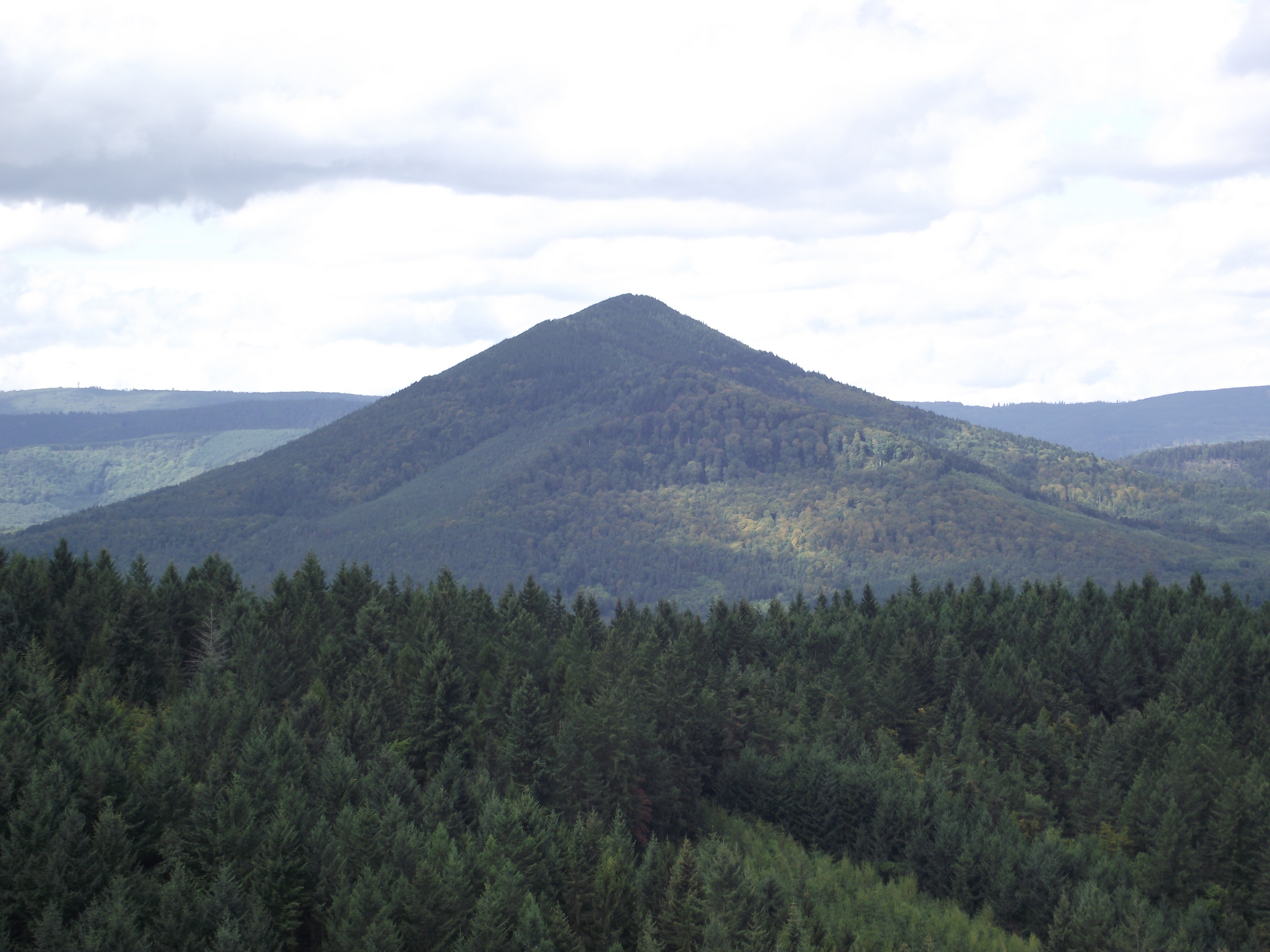
- The Ungersberg seen from Bernstein Castle.

Highest point
- Elevation: 901 m (2,956 ft)
- Coordinates: 48°21′46″N 7°21′31″E

Geography
- Location within France
- Location: Alsace, France
- Parent range: Vosges Mountains

The Ungersberg is a Vosges peak that rises to an altitude of 901 meters, located west of the village of Reichsfeld in the Bas-Rhin department. The Vosges Club has built the Hering Tower at its summit, offering a wide view over the Alsace plain and the surrounding peaks.

== Geography ==
The Ungersberg lies between the Andlau Valley and the Villé valley (Vallée de Villé). From the summit, one can observe a large part of the Alsace plain all the way to the Black Forest, as well as many of the Vosges peaks.

== History ==
The Bundschuh (the 'laced shoe') is the generic name for a series of coordinated peasant uprisings centered around the Upper Rhine region. The first documented meeting of the movement’s leaders took place at the summit of the Ungersberg on March 23, 1493.

The summit of the Ungersberg was likely chosen as a meeting point due to its position at the convergence of numerous jurisdictions in a fragmented Alsace.

This reform movement, which played a role in the emergence of an Alsatian consciousness, came to a bloody end in Lower Alsace, not far from there, in Scherwiller, on May 20, 1525.

== See also ==
- Vosges Mountains
