= Wasenkoepfel =

- Location within France

Highest point
- Elevation: 526 m (1,726 ft)
- Coordinates: 48°58′29″N 7°35′56″E

Geography
- Location: Lower Alsace, Alsace, France
- Parent range: Vosges

The Wasenkoepfel (526 m) is a hill northwest of Oberbronn in the Lower Alsace in the French Vosges. It is the highest point of the southern Wasgau, a Franco-German, cross-border region that comprises the southern part of the Palatinate Forest and the northern part of the Vosges.

== Tourism ==
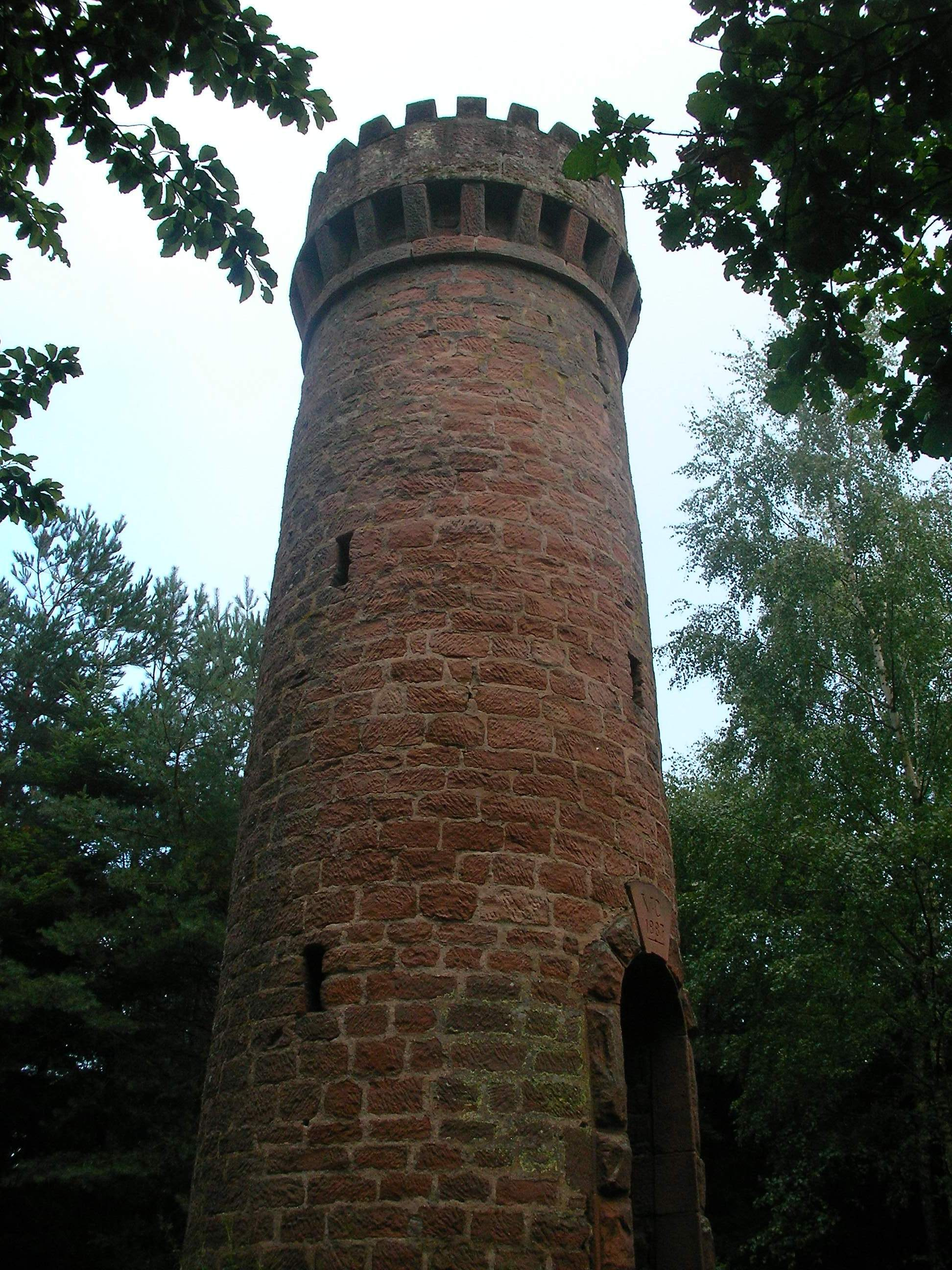
Observation tower

The Wasenkoepfel lies on the French long-distance path, the GR 53. It is also accessible on foot from Oberbronn on the path to the ruins of Château du Grand-Arnsberg (German: Burg Groß Arnsburg) taking about three quarters of an hour. There is an observation tower at the top erected in 1887 by the Vosges Club (Club Vosgien); however its view is now restricted by trees.
