= Andlau =

Andlau Àndlöi
- Commune
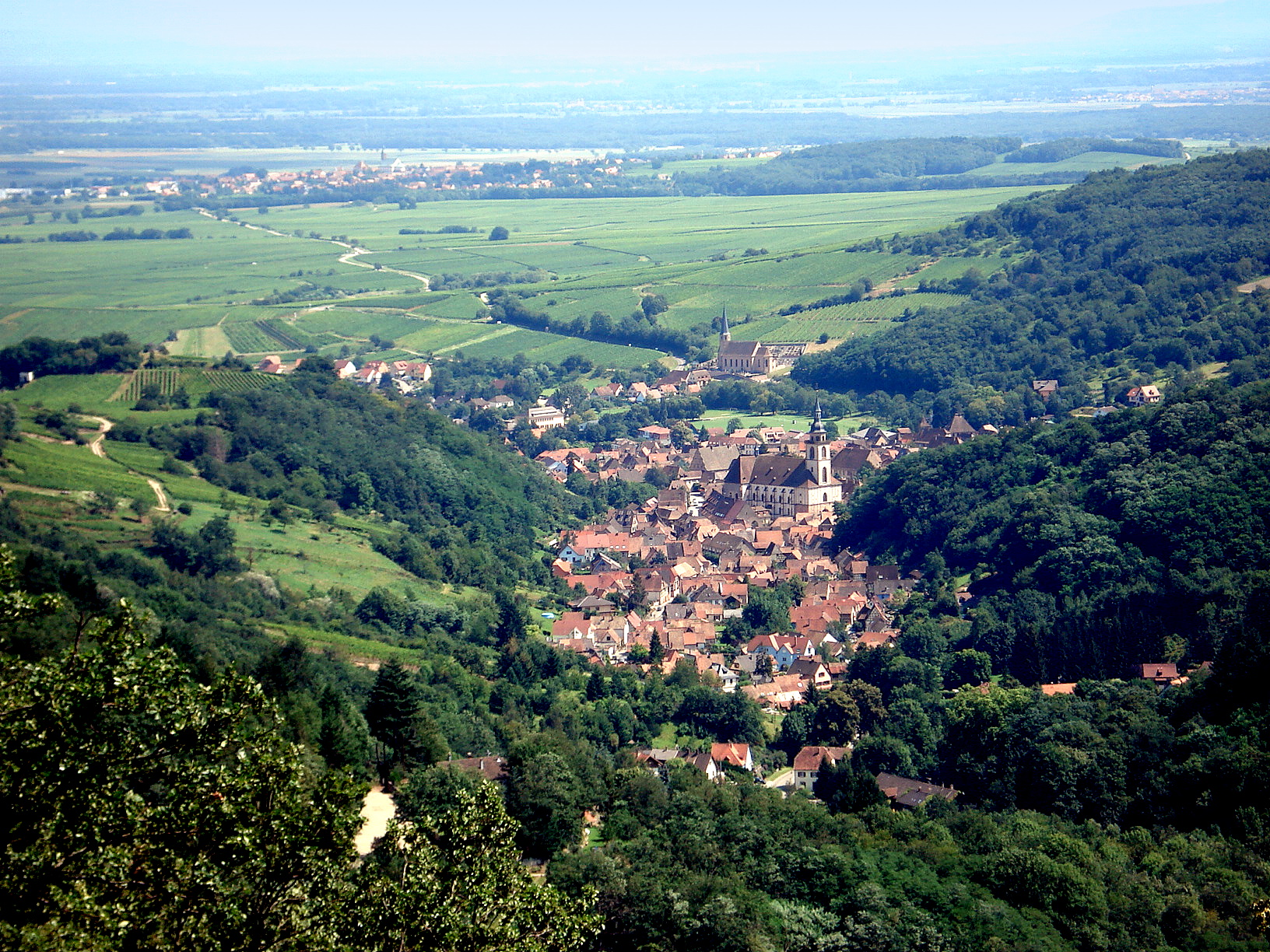
- A general view of Andlau

- Coat of arms
- Location of Andlau
- Location within France Location within Grand Est
- Coordinates: 48°23′14″N 7°25′07″E
- Country: France
- Region: Grand Est
- Department: Bas-Rhin
- Arrondissement: Sélestat-Erstein
- Canton: Obernai
- Intercommunality: Pays de Barr

Government
  - Mayor (2020–2026): Thierry Frantz
- Area^{1}: 23.69 km^{2} (9.15 sq mi)
- Highest elevation: 795 m (2,608 ft)
- Lowest elevation: 205 m (673 ft)
- Population (2023): 1,757
  - Density: 74.17/km^{2} (192.1/sq mi)
- Time zone: UTC+01:00 (CET)
  - Summer (DST): UTC+02:00 (CEST)
- INSEE/Postal code: 67010 /67140
- ^{1} French Land Register data, which excludes lakes, ponds, glaciers > 1 km^{2} (0.386 sq mi or 247 acres) and river estuaries.

Andlau (French pronunciation: [ɑ̃dlo] or [andlau]; Alsatian: Àndlöi) is a commune in the Bas-Rhin department in Alsace, Grand Est region of northeastern France.

The village owes its origin to Andlau Abbey which was founded in 880 by Richardis, the empress of Charles the Fat. Andlau has been a wine-growing centre and traveler destination since its earliest days.

The commune has been awarded two flowers by the National Council of Towns and Villages in Bloom in the Competition of cities and villages in Bloom.

== Geography ==
Andlau is located some 40 km south by south-west of Strasbourg and 20 km north of Selestat. It is a small town in the Canton of Barr located in the valley of the Andlau river in the foothills of the Vosges Mountains. The surroundings of Andlau town are entirely the Vosges, including a summit, the Stosskopf, which attains a height of 700 metres. The surrounding communes include Mittelbergheim to the north-east, Eichhoffen to the east, Bernardvillé to the south, Le Hohwald to the north-west and Barr. The commune has an area of 23.69 km^{2} and its highest point is towards the northern tip of Niederberg and rises to 807 metres.

Access to the commune is by the D62 road from Exit 13 on the A35 autoroute which goes west to the town. There is also the D425 from just north of Eichhoffen going west to the village then continuing west to Le Hohwald.

West of the town the commune is entirely forested with an extensive network of forest roads. East of the town there is a small area of farmland.

== Watercourses ==
The Andlau River: a small river which rises in the Vosges Mountains near the Champ du Feu which is a mountain situated at the eastern end of the Ban-de-la-Roche. It flows from west to east through Andlau, Eichhoffen, Saint-Pierre, Stotzheim, Zellwiller, Hindisheim, Lipsheim, and Fegersheim then empties into the Ill downstream of Ill commune. Further upstream the waters of the Valff and the Kirneck used to power 60 mills and other factories until the 19th century. Its course is about 45 km.

=== Toponymy ===
- Andelaha
- Andelelaha
- Andeloïa
- Andeloha (999 AD)
- Andelow
- Andeloa
- Andelow
- Andelach (1126)

=== Origins of the name ===
Andlau is a distortion of the word Andelaha from Andelaw or Andlaw. Andelaha could come from the original name of the river of which there are traces in old maps drawn in the 15th and 16th centuries. The Andlau River is 42.8 km long and flows from the Champ du Feu to the Ill and is the origin of the name of the town. On 30 July 1857 Andlau was called Andlau-au-Val to distinguish it from that of Andelot in Haute-Marne. At the beginning of the 20th century the name became Andlau.

== History ==
=== An area occupied since Gallo-Roman times ===
The village undoubtedly already existed in Gallo-Roman times. The village developed around the abbey of nuns founded in 880 AD by Richarde de Souabe, daughter of the Count of Alsace who was known as Erchangar. Sainte Richarde later the wife of Emperor Charles the Fat who was grandson of Louis the Pious.

=== The foundation of the abbey ===
The abbey was initially placed in Saint-Sauveur following the rule of Saint Benedict and received the protection of the Pope. It was allowed to raise money until 1004. It was endowed with substantial assets and subsequently received many privileges . The Emperor Charles IV, in confirming it in 1347, declared the abbey free of all charges and contributions and granted to the abbess Adelaide de Geroldseck, and her successors, the title of Princess of the Empire. The exact date of its secularization is not known but it is believed that it took place between the 12th and 14th centuries. In addition to the charter from Emperor Charles IV many other anterior and posterior diplomas were granted to the abbey to confirm the privileges it had already obtained or to give it new ones. The recipients were required to demonstrate sixteen Quarters of nobility without misalliance and the most illustrious families of Alsace and Germany vied for the honour of admitting their girls. They were not subject to a vow and could, when they wished, return to their families and even marry.

This abbey received almost from its inception an illustration that greatly contributed to its prosperity and its status. It is known that the Emperor Charles the Fat was too weak to govern the vast empire that had been reunited under him by the death of his two brothers left in the care of the Empress Richarde, his wife. She had to advise Liutward, Bishop of Vercelli. Courtiers, jealous of the authority of the bishop and the confidence that was accorded him by the Empress, long meditated his ruin and found a way to turn the heart of the weak monarch to jealousy which piety, talents, the eminent qualities of his wife, and twenty-five years of constantly happy marriage were powerless to stop. Liutward was expelled from the court and the repudiated Empress retired to the monastery of Andlau. The legend of Saint Richarde was that she suffered the ordeal of fire and, dressed in a shirt coated with wax, was set fire in four places, she was not burned by the flames which were miraculously extinguished. In any case it was in this monastery that the wife of Charles the Fat ended her days in prayer and good works. She also found a source of consolation in letters in which she wrote with great distinction several beautiful poems which have been preserved until now where she writes of her resignation and the purity of her soul. She died before the end of the 9th century and was buried in a side chapel of the Andlau church. A century and a half later she was canonized by Pope Leo IX who was in Alsace, his homeland, and came to bless Andlau's new church built by the Abbess Mathilde, sister of Emperor Henry III.

=== Andlau family ===
The first references to the house of Andlau are in the 12th century which makes this family one of the oldest lines in France. The Andlau line forms 0.5% of the French nobility and their origins date back to the late Middle Ages so are considered old nobility – distinguished nobility or ancient nobility. The nobles of Andlau may have given their name to the town. According to some sources, the Andlau family arrived in Alsace in Roman times with another family: the Dandolo of Venice. This family had founded the castle of Bas-d'Andlau.

Another version attributes the creation of the town to a man named Balthasard d'Andolo, a native of Bologna. He would have followed Charlemagne who was heading north in the 8th century. It would then be located in the valley of Eleon and could be the origin of the foundation of the noble lineage of the Andlau family who gave their name to Andlau. Balthasard and his son founded a small monastery in the valley near the Andlau river. This theory would therefore go against the version that it was Sainte Richarde who founded the abbey.

Another proposal speaks of a knight of Andlau who helped Richarde to find a location where the bear was scratching the ground. The Andlau family acceded to the status of knights from the 9th century. They gave their name to the town and thus made bequests to the abbey. But one can also argue that the family took the name of the town which later gave them their coat-of-arms. The first character, Gunther d'Andalau, was cited in 1141 and became abbot of Saint-Blaise. The lords of Andlau won renown during the Battle of Sempach on 9 July 1386, during which the Earl of Andlau lost four of his sons. It was particularly affected by the Thirty Years' War.

The Andlau family are related to many characters in the history of France, such as Claude-Adrien Helvetius, Jacques Necker, Germaine de Staël, Jean Le Marois, Hardouin-Gustave Andlau, and Albert de Mun.

=== The village formed around the abbey ===
Gradually a small town formed around the abbey that the abbess gave in fief in 1364 to the Andlau noble family, one of the most illustrious of Alsace, whose history is mentioned for the first time in 1141 when Ganthier Andlau was abbot of Saint-Blaise. Nine years later Othon, Count of Andlau (Otto de Andelaha) appeared as a witness to a diploma from the Emperor Conrad III in favour of the Abbey of Saint-Blaise. This family has produced many distinguished men which proves the high esteem which it enjoyed under an ancient privilege which was renewed by Charles V in 1550: the eldest son bore the title of hereditary knight of the Holy Roman Empire.

=== Andlau as a pilgrimage town ===
A pilgrimage was dedicated early in its history to the Virgin Mary in the crypt of the church where the canons met every day to pray. The 14th-century tower, which is often confused Spesbourg Castle, is attested to belong to the nobles of Dicka. Between the 13th and 14th centuries four castles were built in Andlau. One of these was the castle of Wibelsberg-Crax, of which there are a few remnants. Built between 1232 and 1249, it was first demolished by Eberhard d'Andlau then rebuilt from 1293. It was called Crax Castle but was finally demolished in 1298 by order of the Bishop of Strasbourg. The lords of Andlau fortified the town in the 15th century. In 1695 the Forest Ranger of Andlau, Frantz Ettighoffen, killed one of the last bears in the Vosges Mountains. In the middle of the 19th century, Andlau had more than eighteen mills. The town is surrounded by forests and vineyards.

=== Heraldry ===
Arms of Andlau	Blazon: Gules, a cross of Or.

== Administration ==
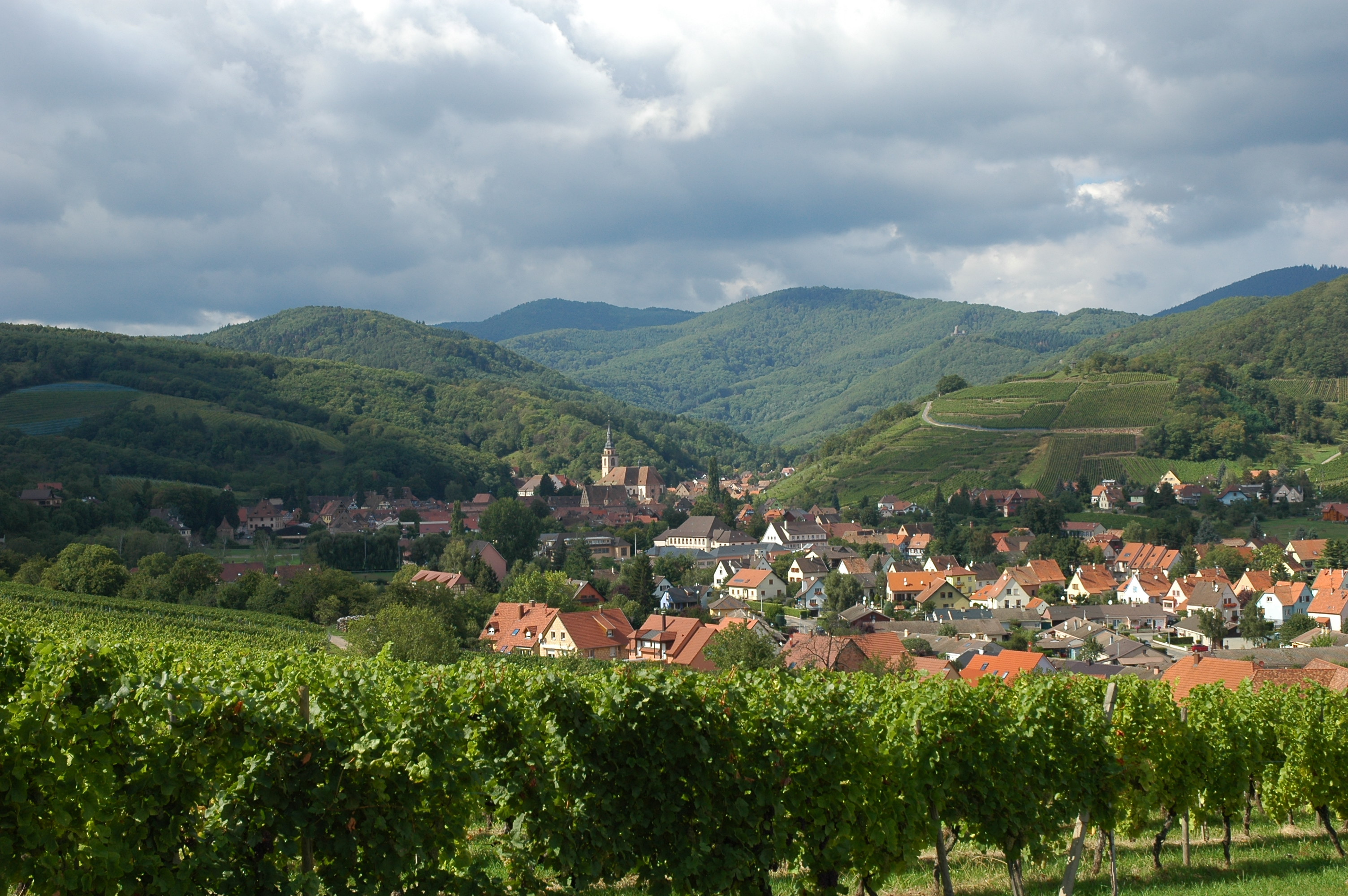
Andlau and its Vineyards

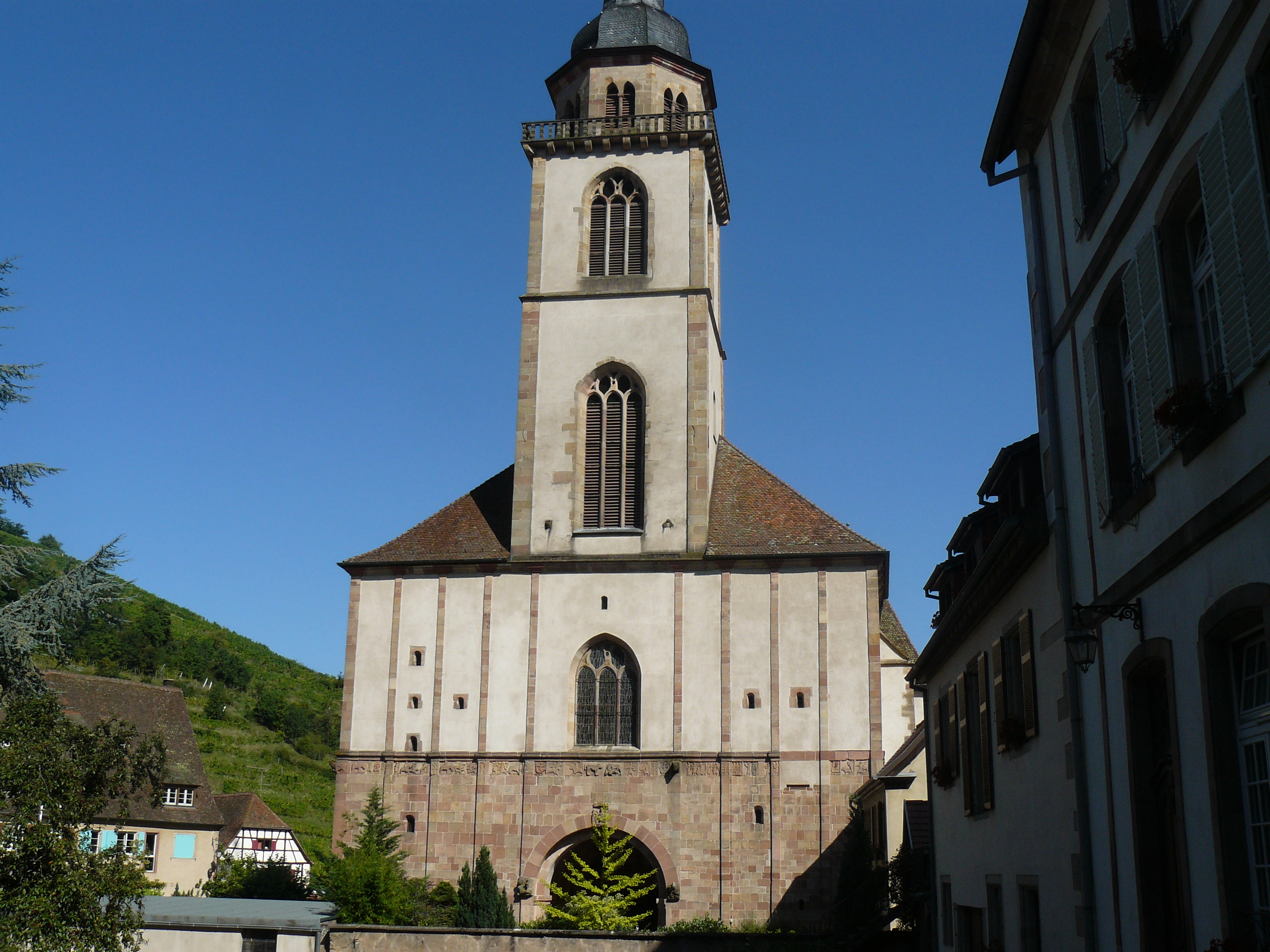
Church of Saint-Peter-and-Saint-Paul (11th-18th centuries)

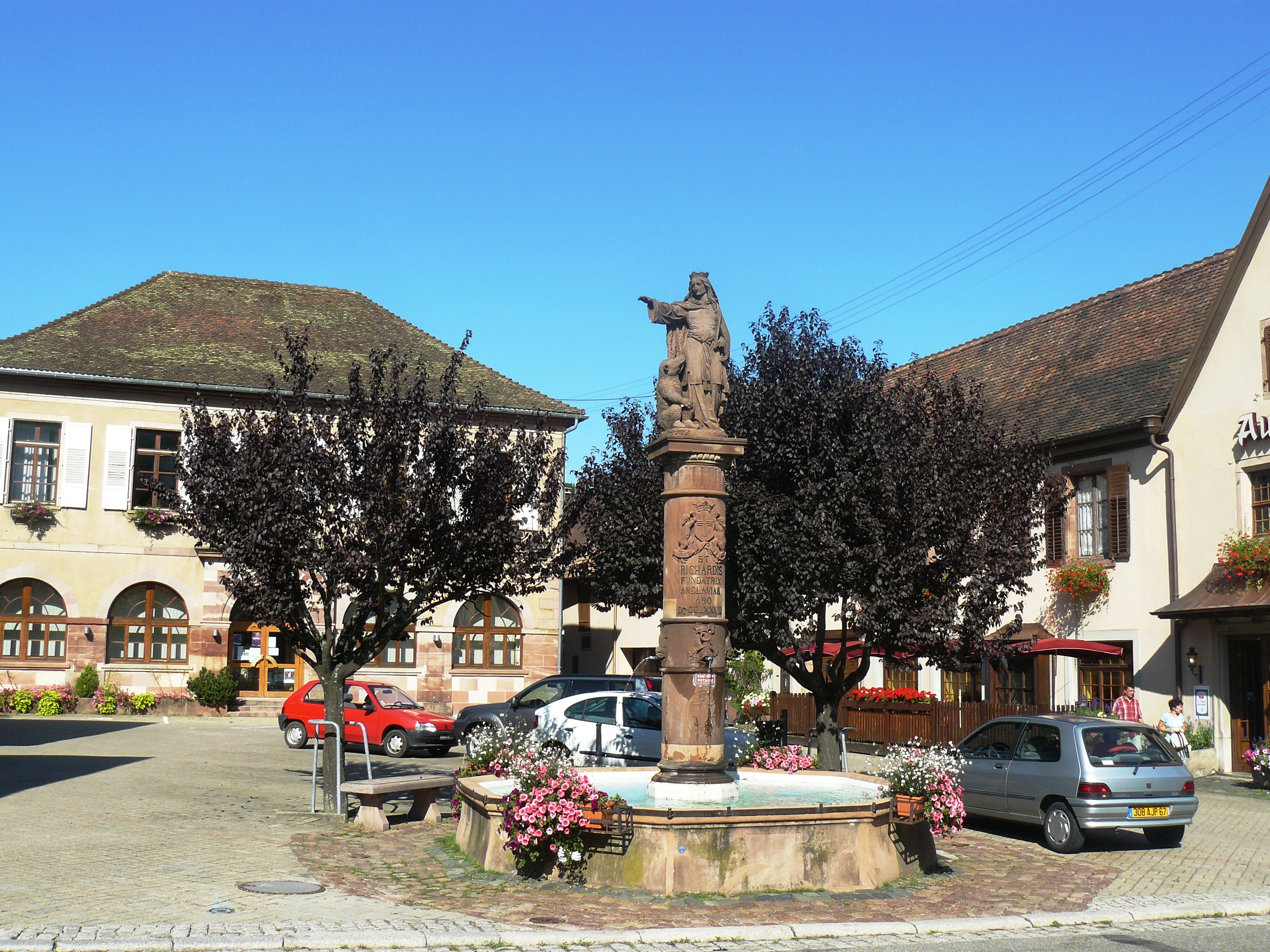
Sainte-Richarde fountain (1876)

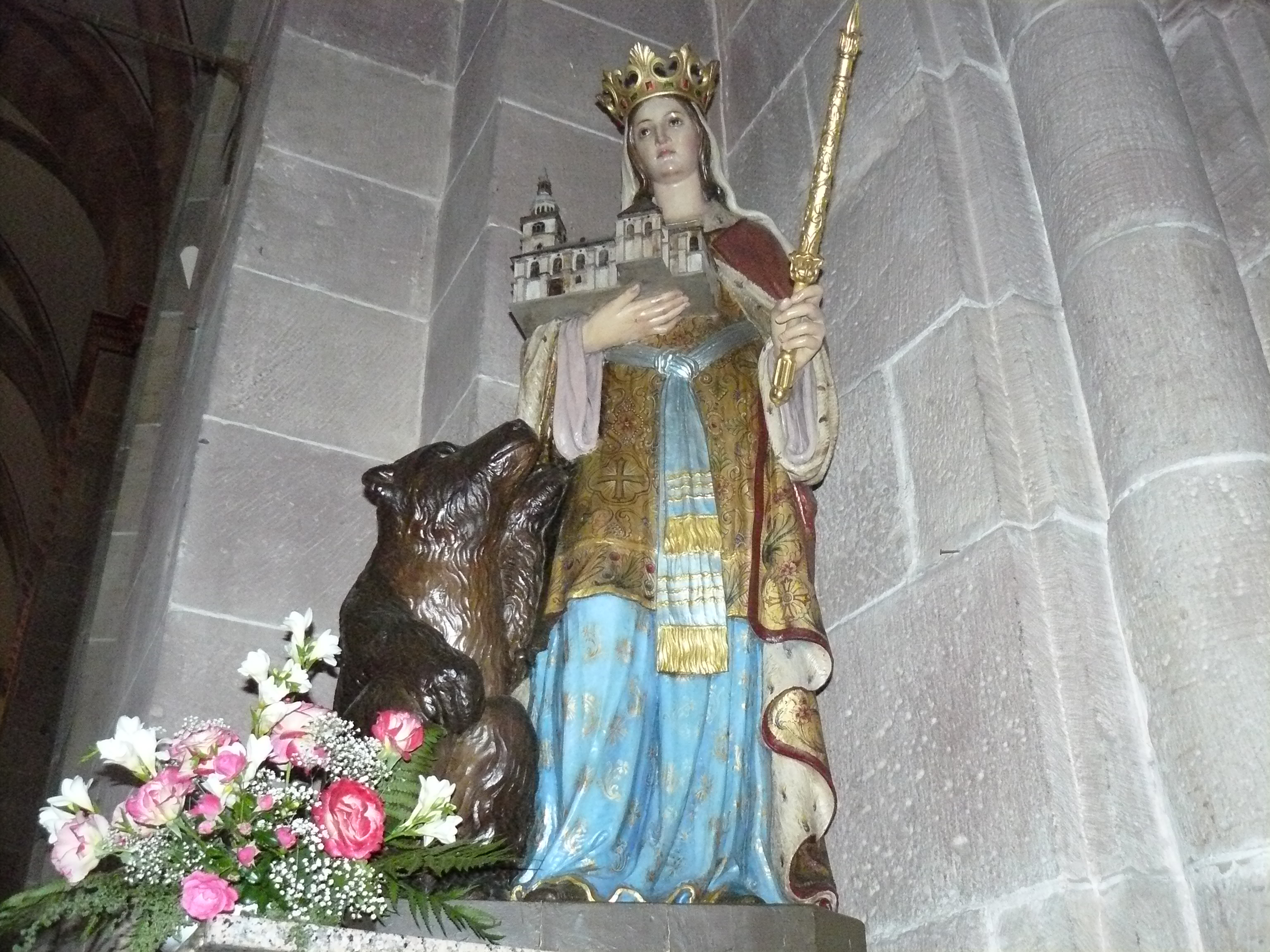
Statue of Sainte Richarde made by an artist from Tyrol

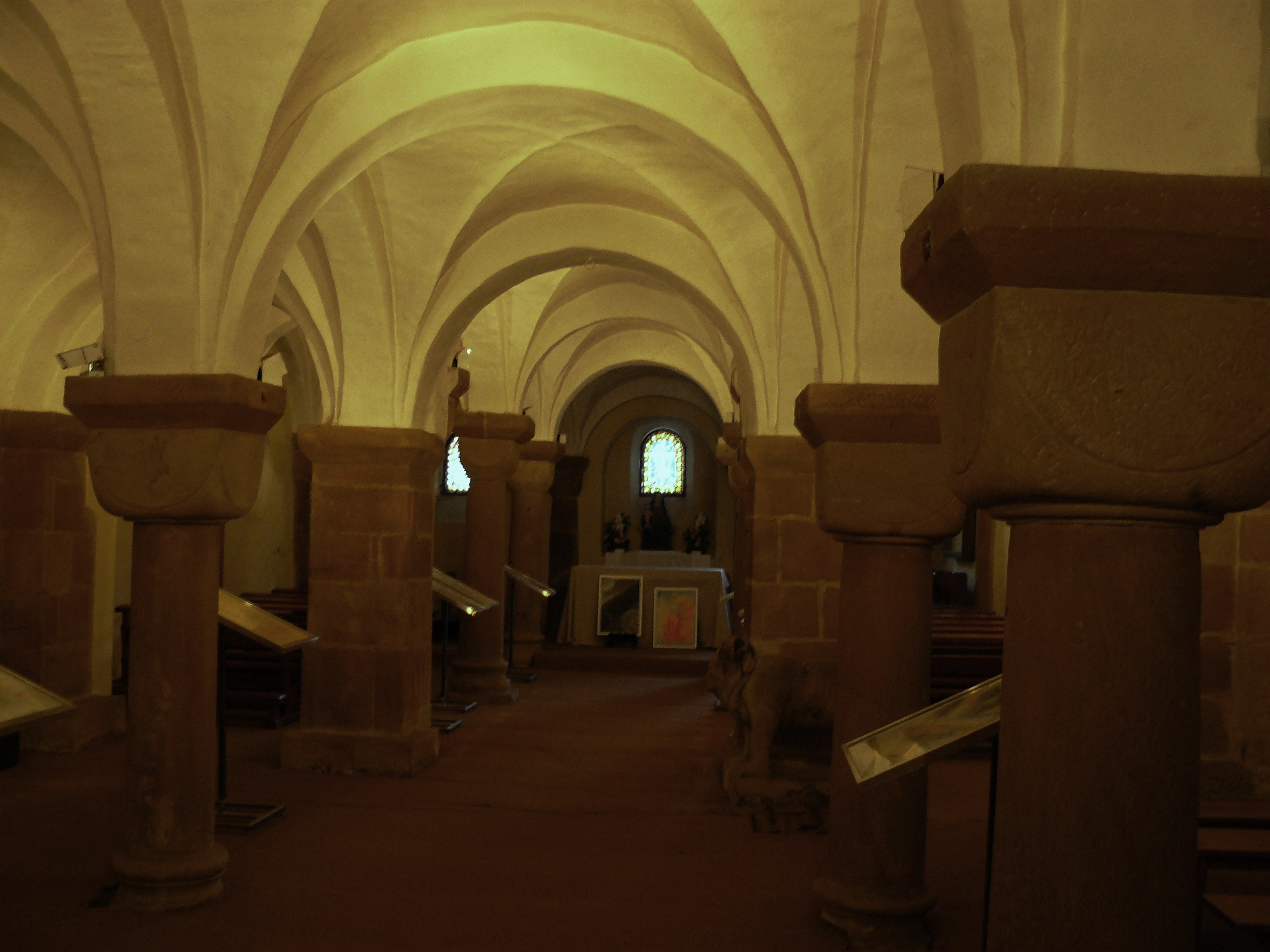
The Abbey crypt of Saint-Pierre-et-Saint-Paul(11th century)

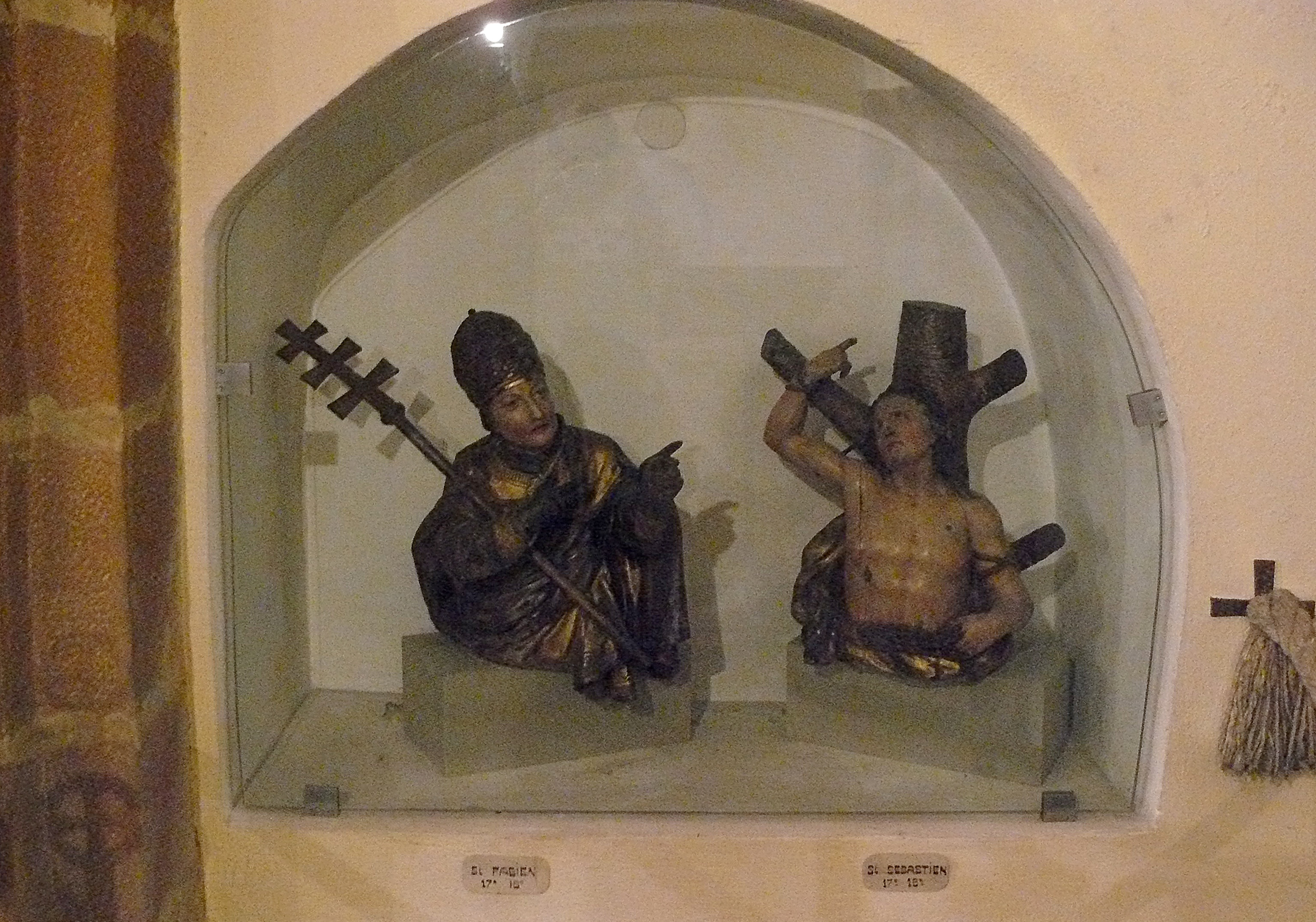
Statues of Saint Fabien and Saint Sébastien (17th-18th centuries) in the crypt of the Church of Saint-Peter-and-Saint-Paul

List of Successive Mayors

From	To	Name
1882	1902	Emile Wach
1902	1914	A. Bohn
1914	1918	Victor Alfred Kientz
1918	1919	Alex Bohn
1919	1921	Jules Wach
1921	1940	Jérôme Meyer
1941	1942	Paul Bass
1943	1944	Charles Enaux
1945	1946	Charles Roth (interim after Liberation)
1946	1947	Jules Traeger
1947	1950	Alphonse Moritz
1950	1971	Auguste Gresser
1971	1989	Pierre Allenbach
1989	1994	Emile Caffiau
1994	1995	Lucien Vogt
1995	2008	Maurice Laugner
2008	2020	Fabien Bonnet
2020	2026	Thierry Frantz

=== Twinning ===
Andlau has twinning associations with:

- Sexau (Germany) since 1981.

== Demography ==
The inhabitants of the commune are known as Andlaviens or Andlaviennes in French.

Historical population

Year	Pop.	±% p.a.
1793	2,012	—
1800	2,184	+1.18%
1806	1,990	−1.54%
1821	1,956	−0.11%
1831	2,179	+1.09%
1836	2,257	+0.71%
1841	2,193	−0.57%
1846	2,107	−0.80%
1851	2,110	+0.03%
1856	2,062	−0.46%
1861	2,018	−0.43%
1866	2,007	−0.11%
1872	2,008	+0.01%
1875	1,906	−1.72%
1880	1,892	−0.15%
1885	1,776	−1.26%
1890	1,704	−0.82%
1895	1,706	+0.02%
1900	1,731	+0.29%

Year	Pop.	±% p.a.
1905	1,735	+0.05%
1910	1,789	+0.61%
1921	1,510	−1.53%
1926	1,515	+0.07%
1931	1,559	+0.57%
1936	1,493	−0.86%
1946	1,453	−0.27%
1954	1,553	+0.84%
1962	1,529	−0.19%
1968	1,584	+0.59%
1975	1,919	+2.78%
1982	1,744	−1.36%
1990	1,632	−0.83%
1999	1,654	+0.15%
2007	1,843	+1.36%
2012	1,799	−0.48%
2017	1,739	−0.68%
2023	1,757	+0.17%

Source: EHESS and INSEE

== Culture and heritage ==
The commune has a very large number of buildings and structures that are registered as historical monuments. Below are listed some of the most prominent historical monuments.

=== Civil heritage ===
- The Tile Factory (16th century)
- The Agricultural Warehouse / Abbey Shop (15th century)
- The Commandery of Teutonic Knights (1741). The Commandery contains several items that are registered as historical objects:
  - Wood Panelling (1742)
  - An Altar, altar seating, Retable, and Painting (18th century)
  - A Tombstone of a Commander (17th century)
  - A Tombstone of Johann Von Rinderbach (17th century)
- The former Hotel d'Andlau (1582)
- The Sainte Richarde Well (16th century)
- The fortified Château d'Andlau (14th century)

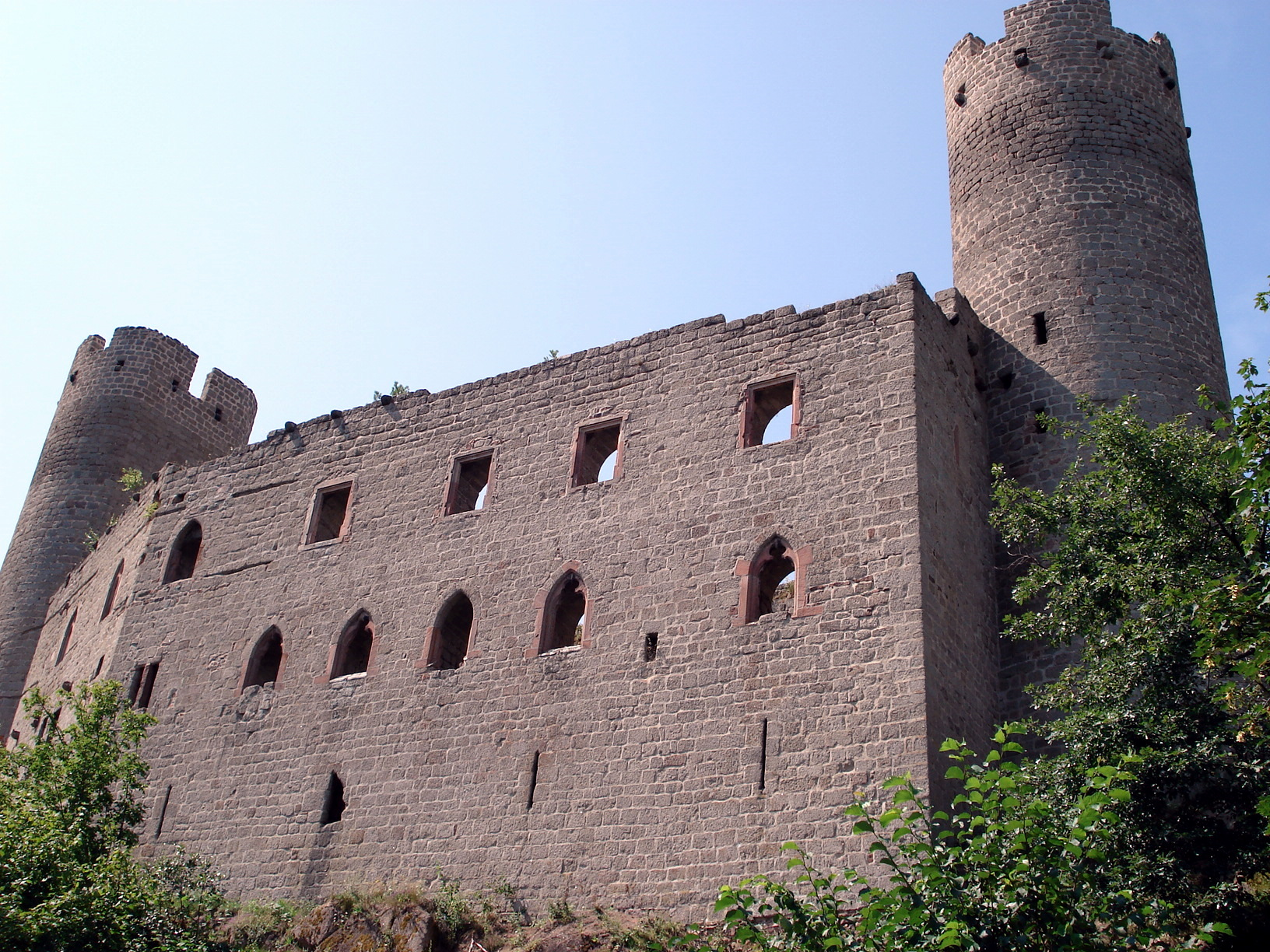
Castle ruin Haut-Andlau

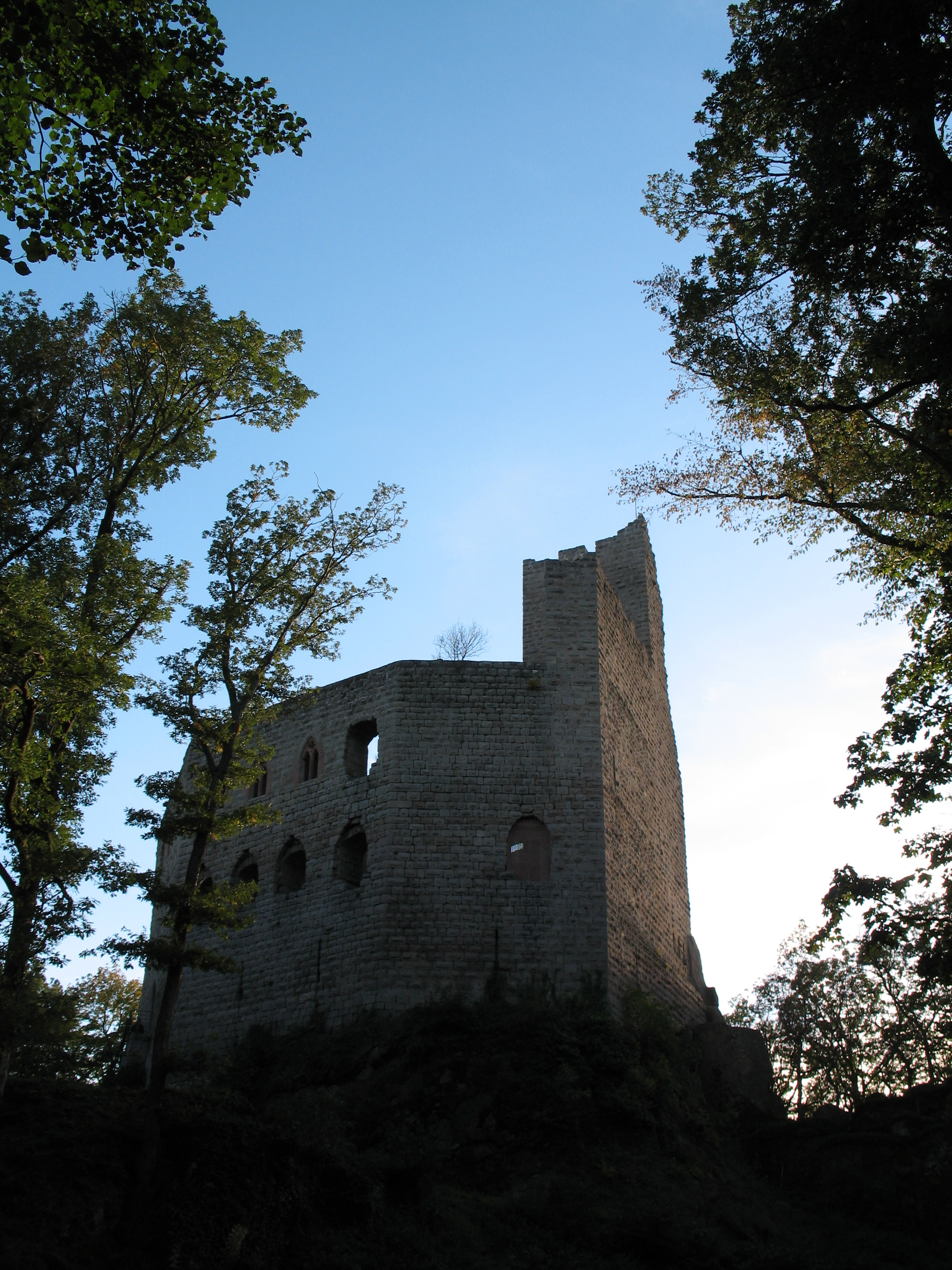
Castle ruin Spesbourg

- The Château de Spesbourg (13th century)
- The Château de Crax (1274)
- Andlau Town (9th century)
- The Town Hall contains four framed paintings which are registered as historical objects:
  - Bouquet in a Pewter Jug, Alexis Kreyder (19th century)
  - Roses in a blue and white Jug, Alexis Kreyder (19th century)
  - Bouquet in a Chinese Vase, Alexis Kreyder (1875)
  - Sunflowers, Alexis Kreyder (1875)

=== Religious heritage ===
- Church of Saint Pierre and Paul called Saint Richardis (15th century). Its Romanesque porch is a masterpiece of medieval Alsatian sculptural art. The crypt dates from the 11th century, the Virgin from the 15th and 16th centuries. The enormous 1715 pulpit. The tomb of Saint Richardis. Stalls from the 15th century. The present church was rebuilt in the 17th century. The massive sculpted frieze on the west wall is 30 m long and 0.60 m high and depicts animal motifs, characters (heroes of chivalry, history of Richardis, etc.). At the entrance are Christ and the Saints Peter and Paul with the first scenes of Genesis. The Abbey contains a very large number of items that are registered as historical objects.
- The Parish Church of Saint Fabien (14th century).
- The Parish Church of Saint André (13th century). Formerly the chapel of Saint Sauveur, the original building dates back to the Carolingian period. Romanesque foundations can still be seen through a ground level gate. This church is still called the cemetery chapel by some villagers. This church also served the people of Eichhoffen who did not have a church until 1865. Between 1777 and 1780 the chapel was built to meet the demand of communicants who regularly attended church. The dead from Eichoffen were buried in the cemetery next to the church. Many ancient graves in the cemetery are therefore not those of the inhabitants of Andlau but Eichhoffen. After several years of entanglements between Andlau and Eichhoffen, the Catholics of Eichhoffen decided to build their own church. The construction of the chapel is the result of several transformations. The steeple of the chapel is octagonal. In the medieval choir there are murals dating from the 15th century. In the cemetery, which is next to the chapel, Commander Marx Cromer (Kremmer) raised, at his cost, the wall that surrounds the chapel between 1495 and 1537. The Saint-André Chapel owes much to generous donors. In 1896 it was restored thanks to Dr. Stoltz. At the end of the 20th century shoring and drainage works were done to avoid the collapse of the wall that faces the road. During the renovation in 1974-1975 skylights were built in the belfry then removed. For a long time processions stopped in front of the chapel as well as at the shrines that were en route. A number of items in the church are registered as historical monuments:
  - The main Altar (1700)
  - 2 Altars, 2 Retables, 2 Paintings (1776)
  - A Mural Painting: Annunciation, Ascending to Calvary, Arrest of Christ (14th century)
  - 2 Altars, 2 banks of altar seating, 2 Retables, 2 Paintings (1776)
  - An Altar, altar seating, Tabernacle (18th century)
  - A Cross: Christ on the Cross (18th century)
  - A Painting: Saint André (18th century)
  - A Pulpit (18th century)
  - A Tomb for Charles Rouge (1916)
  - Cemetery Cross: Christ on the Cross (2) (1832)
  - Cemetery Cross: Christ on the Cross (1) (1832)
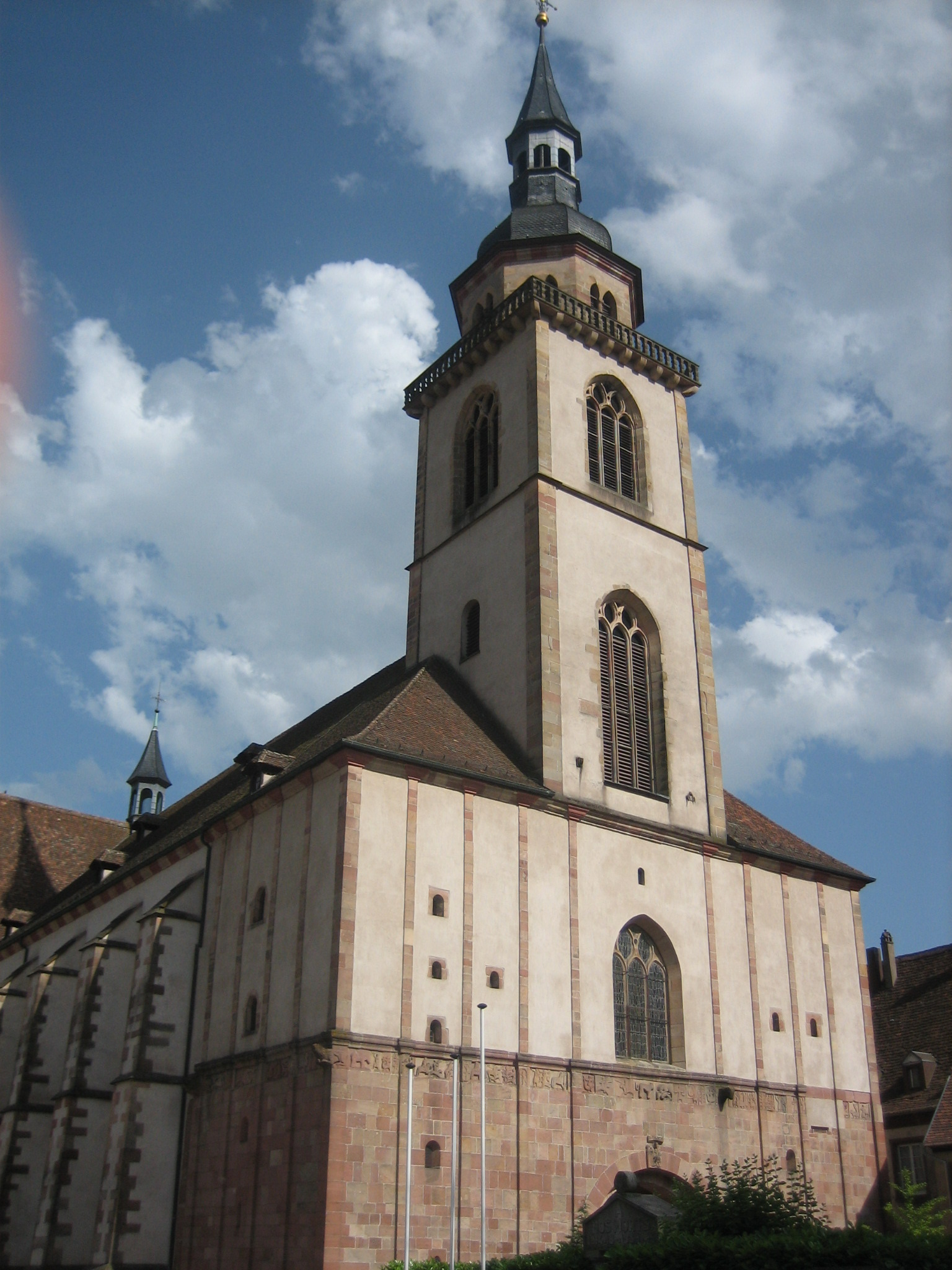
The Church of Saint Pierre and Paul

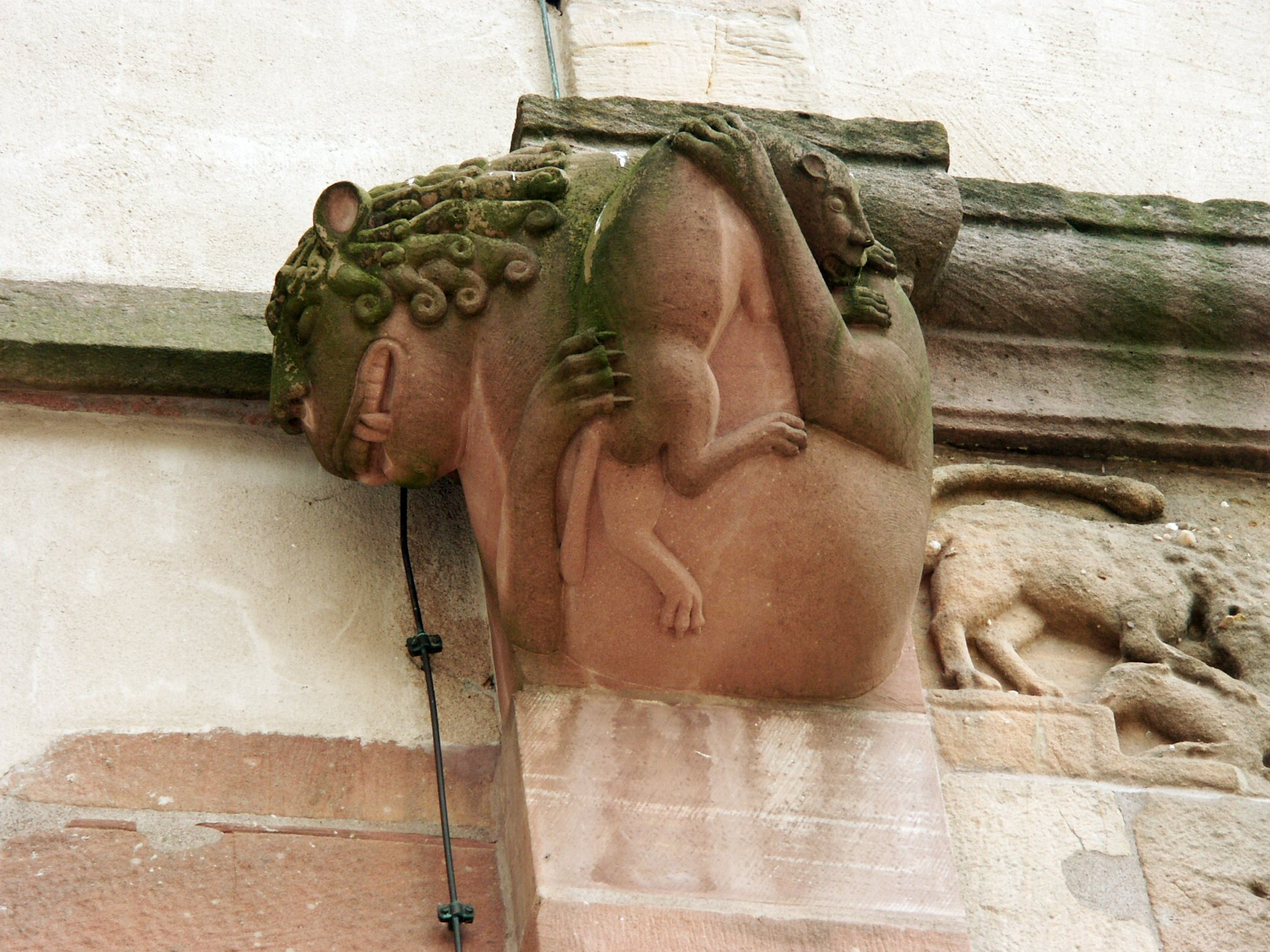
A figure on the north side

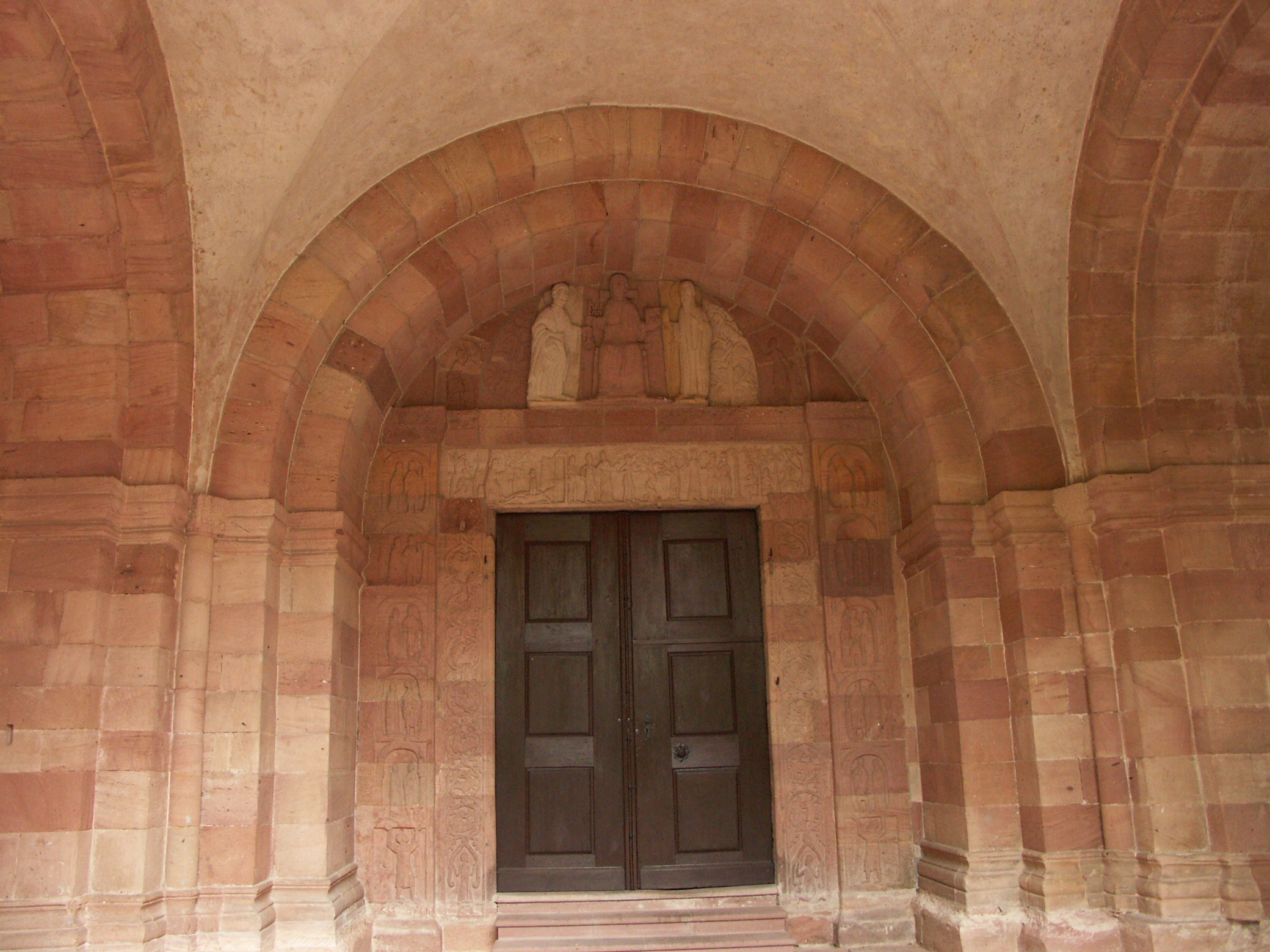
The West gate

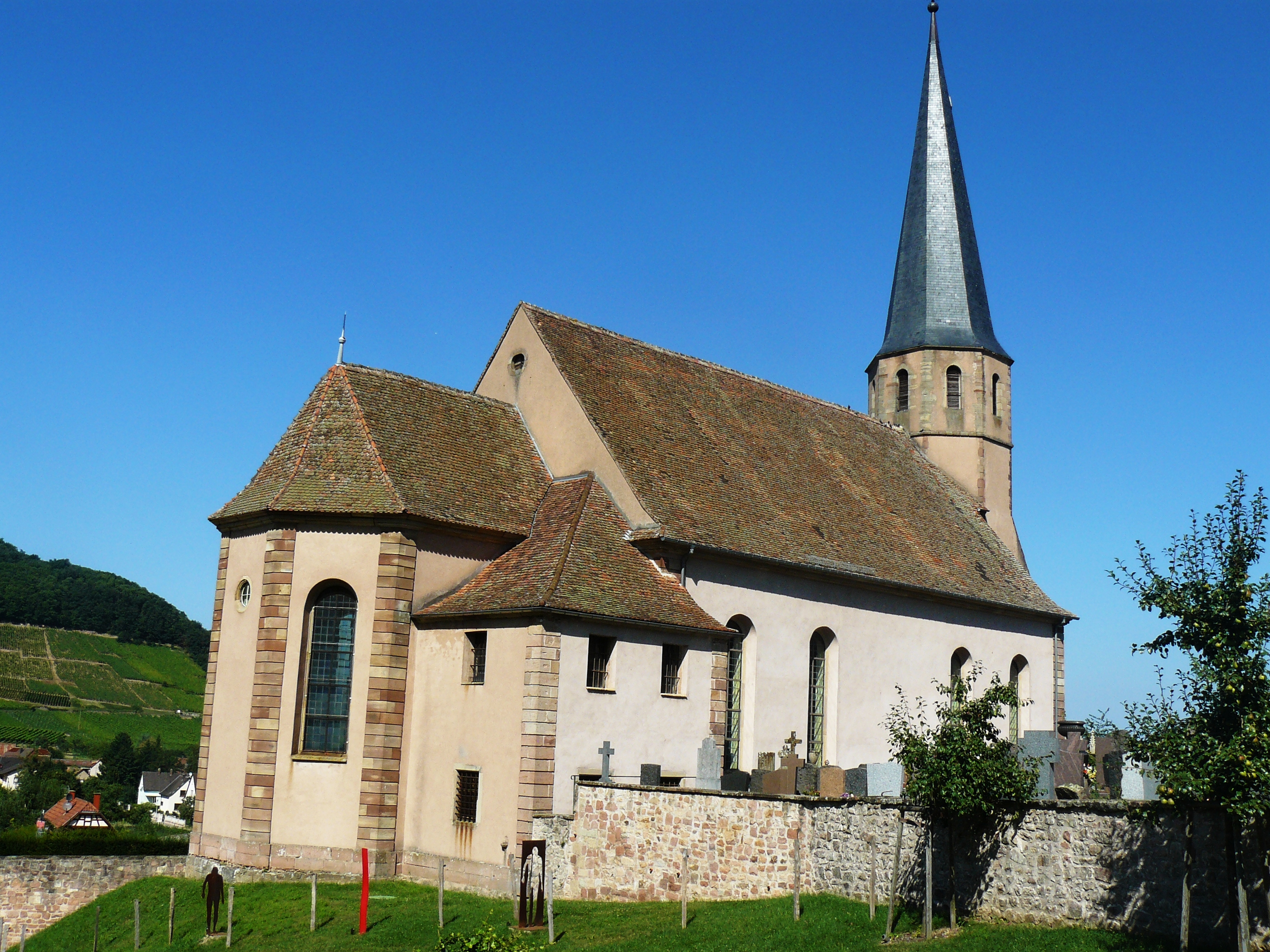
The Chapel of Saint-André

== Notable people linked to the commune ==
- Peter Hemmel of Andlau, painter in glass, German, born in Andlau around 1420/1425
- Francois-Thiebaud Rothfuchs, columnist, born 13 April 1645 at Andlau and died in 1690
- Jean-Louis Stoltz, (1777-1869), a military doctor in the time of Napoleon I and renowned ampelographist
- Philippe Christophe Hallez, born 30 April 1778 at Haguenau, died 18 November 1842 at Andlau, military man and French politician from the 19th century
- Alexis Stoltz, (1803-1896), Gynaecologist with an international reputation.
- Édouard Ignace Andlauer, (1830–1909), organist, born in Andlau
- Alexis Kreyder, (1839-1912), painter
- Joseph Sigrist, (1885-1976), former peasant-senator

== Sources ==
The article was drawn largely from Alsace ancient and modern: topographical, historical, and statistical dictionary of Haut-Rhin and Bas-Rhin, published in 1865. The text has been modified since.

=== Bibliography ===
- Baquol: Alsace ancient and modern: topographical, historical, and statistical dictionary of Haut-Rhin and Bas-Rhin, 1865. (in French)
- Eugène Bécourt: Andlau, its abbey - its hospital - its benefactors, Imprimerie alsacienne, 1914-1921 (in French)
- Miss M. Corbet: Sainte Richarde, her life, her abbey, her church, her shrine and the small town of Andlau, Imprimerie Alsatia, Sélestat, 1932 (in French)
- Jérôme Do bentzinger: Andlau, seen in the 20th century, 2000, ISBN 978-2-906238-98-5, ISBN 2-906238-98-8 (in French)
- Loïc Minor: Andlau, its old stones, their history, Éditions du Kappellenbaum, 2007, ISBN 978-2-9528866-0-4, OCLC 470955907 (in French)
- Hubert Bendert: Andlau the magnificent, Éditions Coprur, Strasbourg, 2007, ISBN 978-2-84208-171-3 (in French)
- Charles-Laurent Salch: Dictionary of castles and fortifications of France in the Middle Ages, éditions Publitotal, Strasbourg, 1978, reprint 1991, ISBN 978-2-86535-070-4, ISBN 2-86535-070-3 (A view of the set of castrale architecture. Pages 35 to 39 Andlau) (in French)
- René Dinkel: The Encyclopedia of Heritage (Historical Monuments, developed and natural heritage - Protection, restoration, regulation. Doctrines - Techniques - Practice), Edition 1, éditions Les Encyclopédies du patrimoine, Paris, September 1997, 1,512 pages, ISBN 978-2-911200-00-7, ISBN 2-911200-00-4 (Chapter I, The parts and choices for conservation of architectural heritage: 1. The promotion and validation of regional identity: History of restorations: contemporary choices for conservation?: The Church of Sainte-Richarde at Andlau, Bas-Rhin, pp. 16–17 (in French)

== See also ==
- Communes of the Bas-Rhin department
