= Andlau Abbey =

Abbey located in Bas-Rhin, France

Coordinates: 48°23′16″N 7°24′54″E

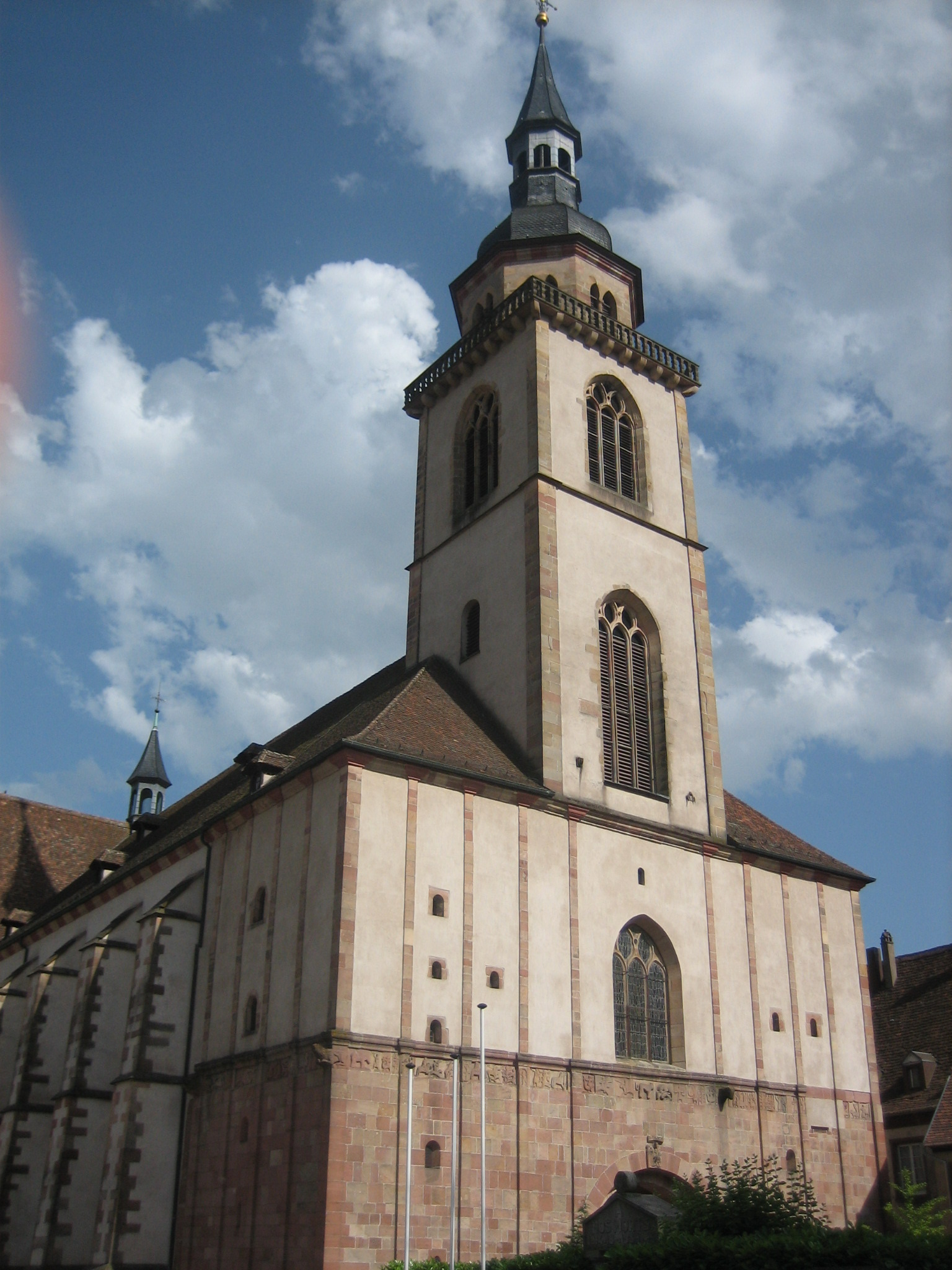
Façade and steeple of the former abbey church. The lower red part is from the 12th century Romanesque building, the upper white parts, in Gothic style, from the 17th century

Andlau Abbey (Abbaye d'Andlau) was a women's collegiate foundation for secular canonesses located at Andlau in Alsace, eastern France.

== History ==
Andlau Abbey was founded in or about 880 by Richardis, later Saint Richardis, empress of Charles the Fat, on her ancestral lands. The foundation legend states that the abbey was sited where Richardis saw a she-bear scratching at the soil; a bear is one of her emblems in reference to this. In 887 Richardis was put to the ordeal by fire by her husband on the pretext of adultery with the chancellor Liutward. She survived the ordeal successfully and withdrew to Andlau, where at the time her niece Rotrod was abbess. She died here in about 895 and was buried in the abbey church.

The abbey survived the Reformation, thanks to the efforts of the Abbess Rebstock, who is commemorated in the present church, but not the French Revolution.

== Buildings ==
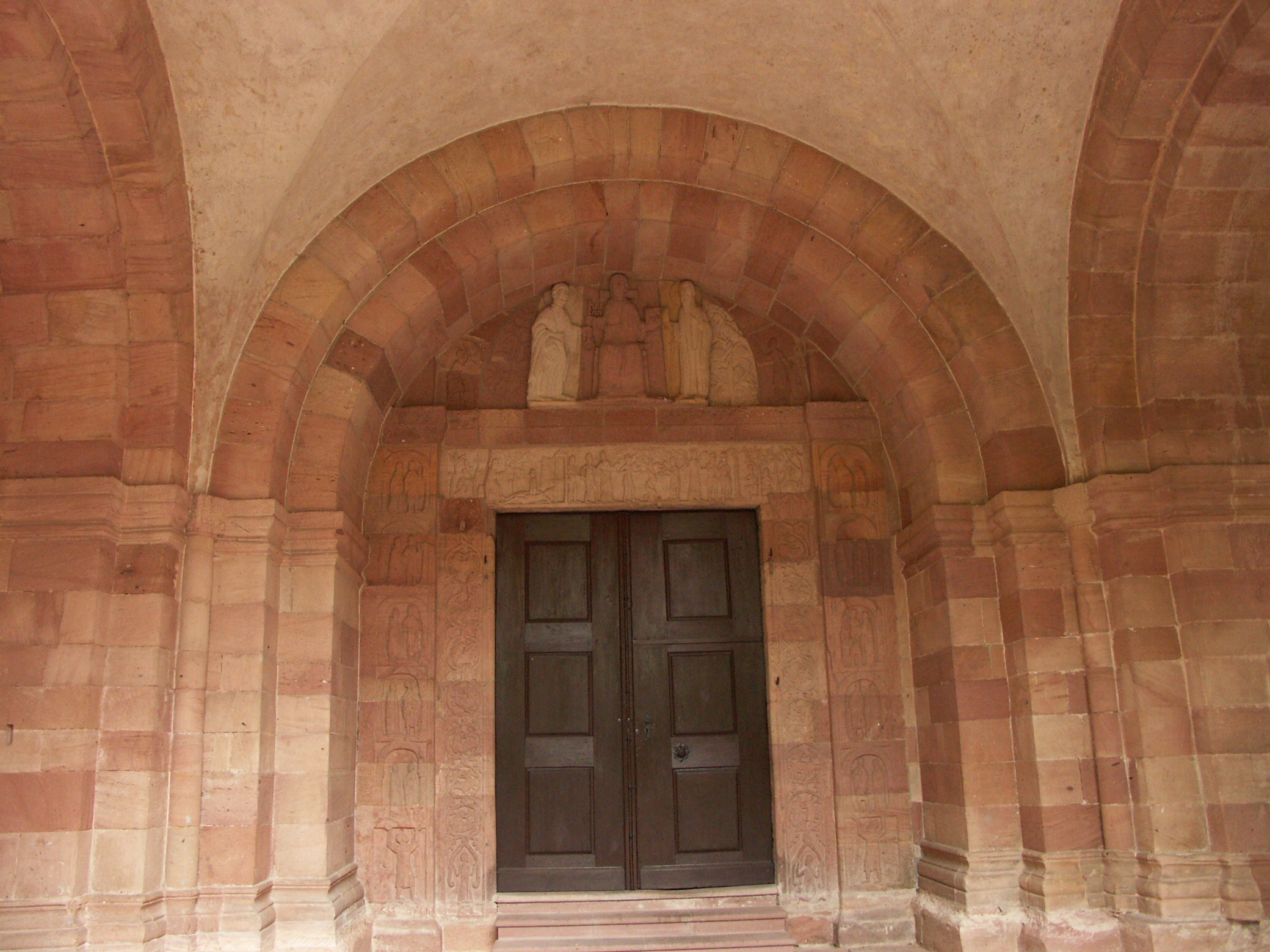
Romanesque portal of the church.

A number of the monastic buildings are still extant. In particular, the former abbey church survives as the parish church of Saints Peter and Paul. The original buildings were from around 880. The abbey was entirely rebuilt in the first half of the 11th century. When Pope Saint Leo IX passed through Andlau in November of that year he was able to translate the remains of the canonised Richardis from the old church to the new Romanesque one. Nothing remains of the first buildings (except for a hole in the floor of the crypt said to have been made by the she-bear). The crypt itself dates from the 11th century. Another major re-construction took place in the 12th century after a serious fire, and another in the 15th century. The nave was completely rebuilt in the late 17th century. The present tomb of Saint Richardis dates from 1350, and is sited in a Baroque chapel of 1707.

The church is however most notable for its rich sculptural decoration, by the Master of Andlau, which is among the finest in Alsace. It is located on the Route Romane d'Alsace.

== Burials ==
- Saint Richardis

== Sources ==
- Andlau website: the Abbey
