= Richardis =

Empress of the Carolingian empire from 881 to 888, Catholic saint

Saint Richardis
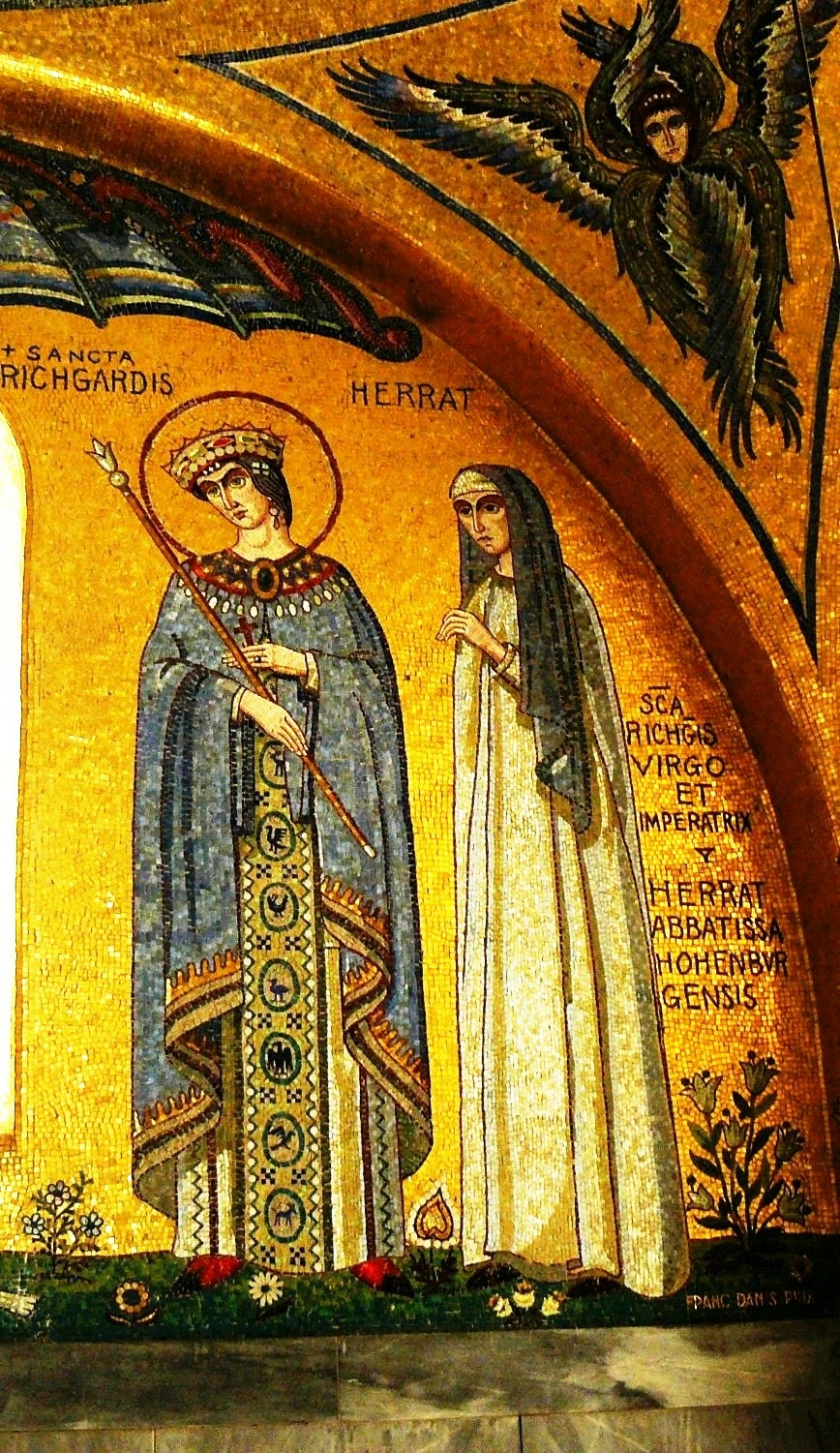
- A depiction of St. Richardis and Herrad of Landsberg in Hohenburg Abbey, Alsace, France.

Carolingian Empress
- Born: c. 840
- Died: 18 September c. 895 (aged c. 55); Andlau, Alsace
- Venerated in: Eastern Orthodox Church; Roman Catholic Church
- Canonized: 10 November 1049 by Pope Leo IX
- Major shrine: Andlau Abbey
- Feast: 18 September
- Attributes: dressed in Imperial robes with crown and palm, and surrounded by flames; dressed as a nun, with crown laid aside, and burning pieces of wood, as well as a bear and a ploughshare
- Patronage: Andlau; protection against fire

Saint Richardis (Latin: Richgardis, Richardis), also known as Richgard, Richardis of Swabia and Richarde de Souabe in French (c. 840 – 18 September, between 894 and 896 AD), was empress of the Carolingian Empire as the wife of Charles the Fat. She was renowned for her piety and was the first abbess of Andlau. Repudiated by her husband, Richardis later became a Christian model of devotion and just rule. She was canonised in 1049.

== Life ==
She was born in Alsace, the daughter of Erchanger, count of the Nordgau, of the family of the Ahalolfinger. She married Charles in 862 and was crowned with him in Rome by Pope John VIII in 881. The marriage was childless.

Charles' reign was marked by internal and external strife, caused primarily by the constant plundering of Norman raiders on the northern French coast. These attacks had intensified as the aggressors, no longer content to pillage the coastline, had moved their attentions to cities and towns along the rivers. Powerless to resist the invasion of the Normans, Charles III paid for their departure with money, despite having military superiority.

By 887, Charles appears to have succumbed to fits of madness. During this crisis, Richardis attempted to rule in her husband's stead but was unsuccessful. In an effort to bring down the over-powerful and hated bishop Liutward, Charles' archchancellor - or, simply, as a means to replace Charles' childless wife, Richardis, with a new queen who might provide children - he and Richardis were accused by Charles and his courtiers of adultery. Charles asserted that their marriage was unconsummated and demanded a divorce. According to legend and her hagiography, she was put to the ordeal by fire, which she passed successfully; in practice, the commission founded by the Pope to handle the requested annulment and charges reported that she was in fact a virgin.

Protected by her family, she then withdrew to Andlau Abbey, which she had founded on her ancestral lands in 880, and where her niece Rotrod was abbess. (Richardis herself was previously lay abbess of religious houses at Säckingen and Zurich). She died at Andlau on 18 September and was buried there.

== The Legend of Richardis ==
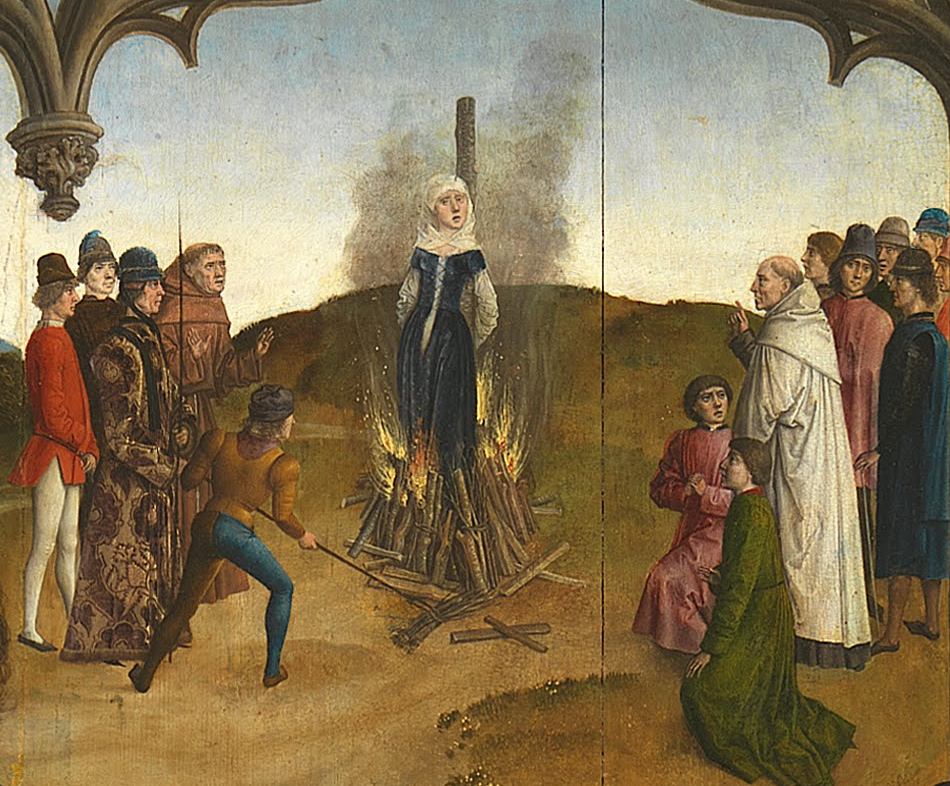
Richardis undergoing ordeal by fire. Painting by Dierec Bouts.

After her lifetime, a legend grew up around the life of Richardis. The legend relates that, despite being a virtuous wife, her husband continued to accuse her of misconduct. This he did for over ten years. In a bid to assure him of her innocence, she finally assented to an ordeal by fire. Though she was barefoot and wearing a shirt covered in wax, the flames nevertheless refused to touch her. Disheartened by her husband's continued mistrust, Richardis left the imperial palace and wandered into the forest. There she was visited by an angel, who ordered her to found a convent in a certain spot, which a bear would indicate to her.

An alternative legend recounts that Richardis found the mother bear grieving over her dead cub in the forest. When Richardis held the cub, it returned to life. After the working of this miracle, both mother and cub remained devoted to the saint for the rest of their lives.

However, the abbey had already been founded seven years before her divorce from Charles the Fat, and the area had long been associated with the bear. Incorporating the mythos of the bear, the nuns at Andlau long maintained a live bear and allowed free board and passage to passing bear-keepers. To this day images of the saint are still often accompanied by that of a bear.

== Veneration ==
Richardis was later canonised and remains translated in November 1049 by Pope Leo IX to a more impressive tomb in the newly rebuilt abbey church. The present tomb dates from 1350.

Richardis is patron of Andlau, and of protection against fires. Her iconography refers to her status as an empress and nun and to her ordeal by fire. The bear and ploughshare refer to the foundation legend of Andlau Abbey.

== See also ==
- List of Catholic saints

== Sources ==
- Ekkart Sauser (2000). "Richardis (Richarde, Richgarda, Richkart): hl. Kaiserin". In Bautz, Traugott (ed.). Biographisch-Bibliographisches Kirchenlexikon (BBKL) (in German). Vol. 17. Herzberg: Bautz. cols. 1141–1142. ISBN 3-88309-080-8.
- Wilhelm Wiegand (1889). "Richgard" . Allgemeine Deutsche Biographie (in German). Vol. 28. Leipzig: Duncker & Humblot. pp. 420–421.

Preceded by Richilde of Metz	Empress of the Holy Roman Empire; 881– 888	Succeeded by Ageltrude
Preceded by Adelaide of Paris	Queen of Western Francia; 884–888	Succeeded by Théodrate of Troyes
Preceded by Liutgard	Queen of Eastern Francia; 882–887	Succeeded by Ota
