= Oberbronn =

Oberbronn Owerbrunn
- Commune
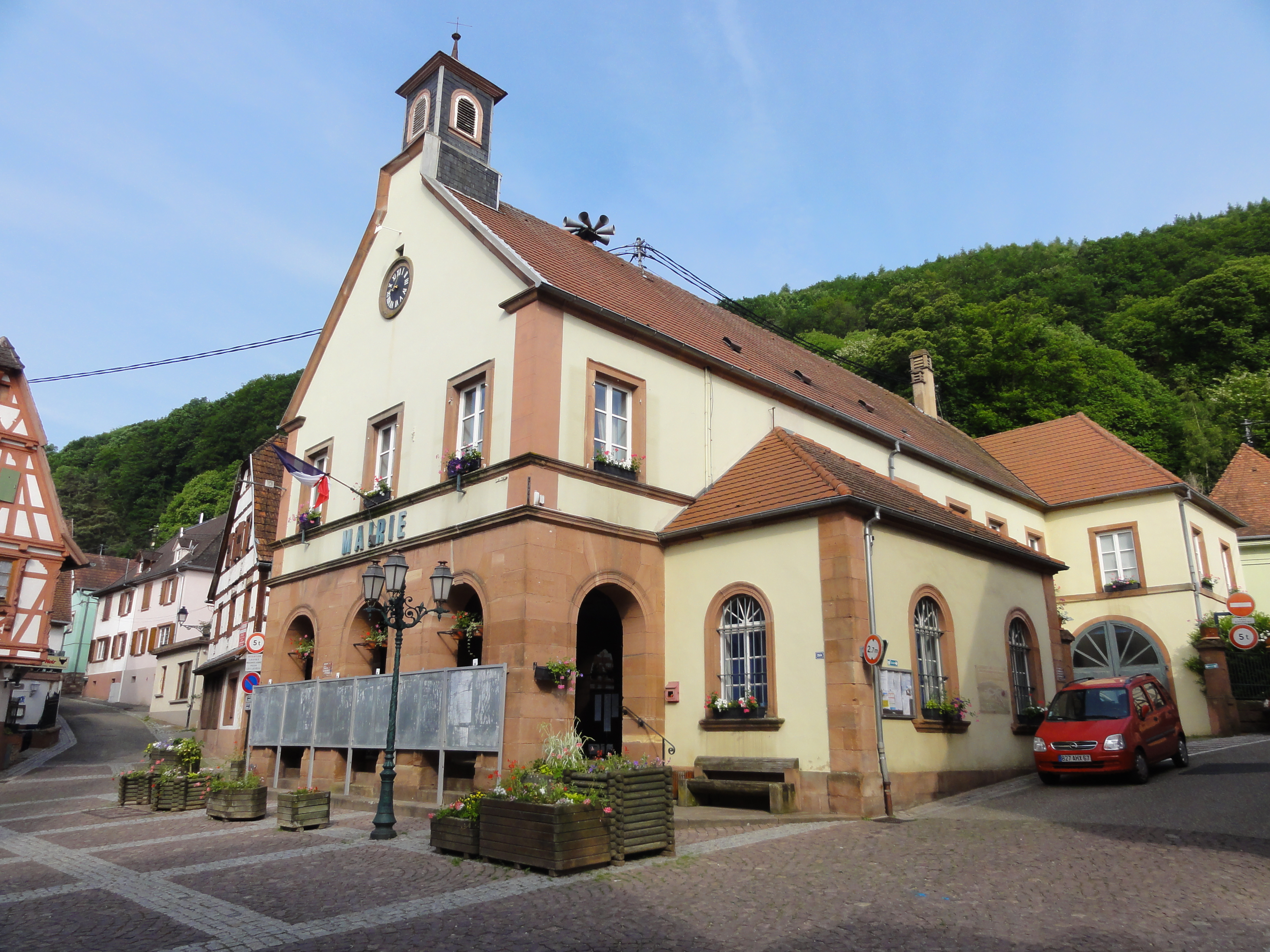
- The town hall in Oberbronn

- Coat of arms
- Location of Oberbronn
- Location within France Location within Grand Est
- Coordinates: 48°56′31″N 7°36′28″E
- Country: France
- Region: Grand Est
- Department: Bas-Rhin
- Arrondissement: Haguenau-Wissembourg
- Canton: Reichshoffen
- Intercommunality: Pays de Niederbronn-les-Bains

Government
  - Mayor (2020–2026): Patrick Bettinger
- Area^{1}: 21.15 km^{2} (8.17 sq mi)
- Highest elevation: 537 m (1,762 ft)
- Lowest elevation: 177 m (581 ft)
- Population (2023): 1,404
  - Density: 66.38/km^{2} (171.9/sq mi)
- Time zone: UTC+01:00 (CET)
  - Summer (DST): UTC+02:00 (CEST)
- INSEE/Postal code: 67340 /67110
- ^{1} French Land Register data, which excludes lakes, ponds, glaciers > 1 km^{2} (0.386 sq mi or 247 acres) and river estuaries.

Oberbronn (French pronunciation: [obəʁbʁɔn]) is a commune in the Bas-Rhin department in Grand Est in north-eastern France.

There is a signposted, historic, circular walk through the village. From an observation tower on the nearby Wasenkoepfel (526m) there are views of the Upper Rhine Plain.

== Population ==
Historical population
Year	Pop.	±% p.a.
1968	1,355	—
1975	1,159	−2.21%
1982	1,184	+0.31%
1990	1,125	−0.64%
1999	1,424	+2.65%
2007	1,526	+0.87%
2012	1,507	−0.25%
2017	1,570	+0.82%
2023	1,404	−1.85%
Source: INSEE

== See also ==
- Communes of the Bas-Rhin department
