= Vosges Club =

French rambling organization

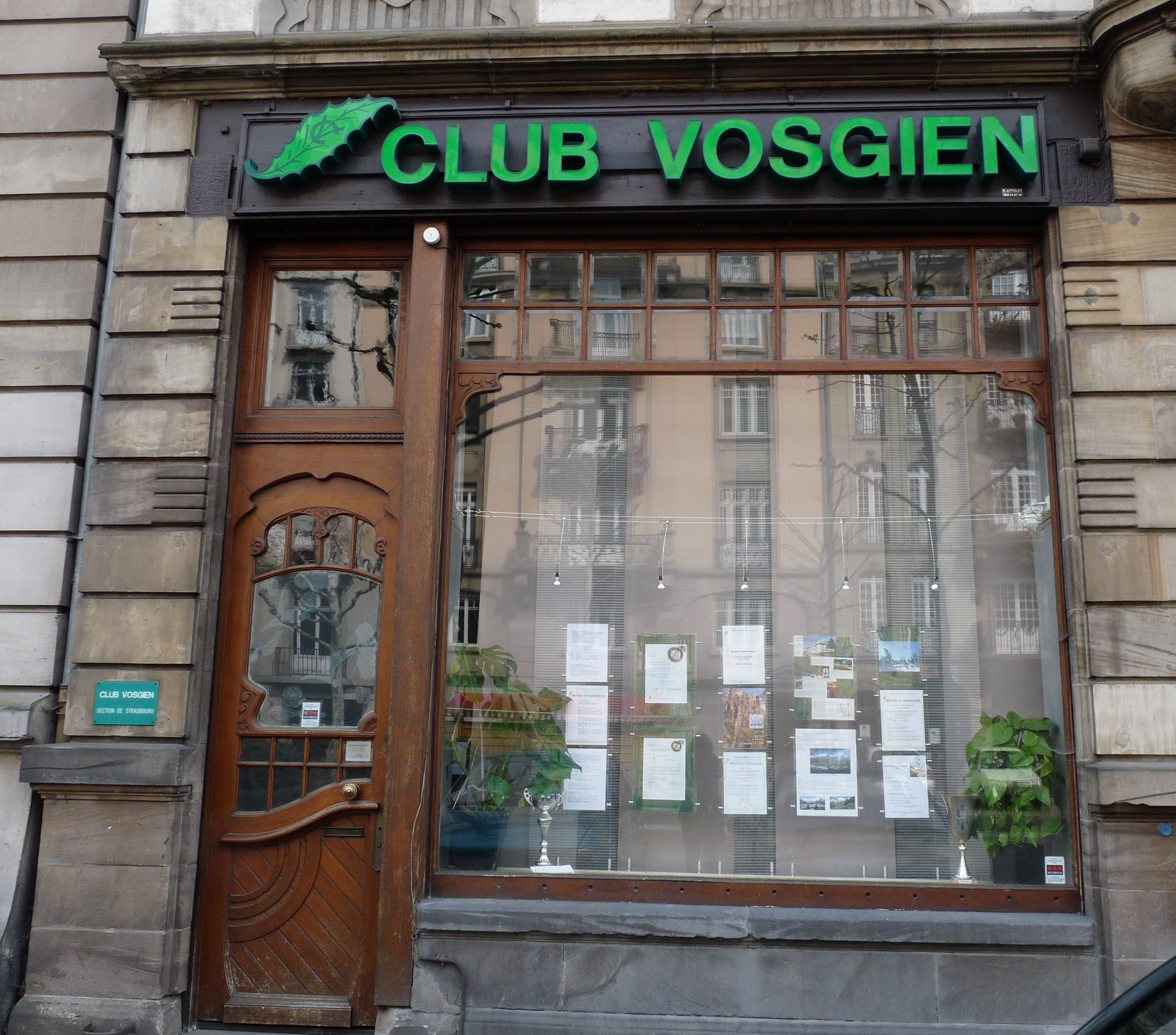
- Waymarking by the Vosges Club
- Formation: 1872; 154 years ago
- Founder: Curt Münde
- Headquarters: Strasbourg, Alsace, France
- Members: 34,000
- Website: www.club-vosgien.eu

The Vosges Club (French: Club Vosgien [klœb voʒjɛ̃], officially the Fédération du Club Vosgien, German: Vogesenclub) is a French rambling organization that covers the Vosges Mountains in the regions of Alsace, eastern Lorraine and the northeastern part of Franche-Comté.

== History ==
The club was founded on 31 October 1872 in Saverne and recognized as a charitable organisation in 1879. Its first chairman was Curt Mündel, known for his much-printed guide Die Vogesen – Reisehandbuch für Elsaß-Lothringen und angrenzende Gebirge. In the period around 1890–1910 the Vosges Club erected viewing towers on the summits of the Scherhol, Grand Wintersberg, Wasenkoepfel, Brotschberg, Climont, Champ du Feu, Heidenkopf, Ungersberg and Faudé.

== Aims and organisation ==
The Vosges Club has 126 local branches as of 2020, and about 34,000 members. The head office is in Strasbourg. Its chief executive currently is Alain Ferstler.

The aims of the club include the maintenance and waymarking of just over 20,000 kilometres (12,427 mi) of footpaths and trails. The waymarks are put up by just over 760 volunteers (which averages out at approximately 26 kilometres (16 mi) per volunteer).

The club manages its own hostels and maintains refuge huts. In addition to promoting hiker tourism the Vosges Club is also dedicated to other outdoor activities like climbing and skiing, as well as nature conservation. The club publishes walking guides and maps, as well as its own magazine, Les Vosges, which comes out 3 times a year.

The Vosges Club is a founding member of the French Ramblers' Association (Fédération française de la randonnée pédestre) and the European Ramblers' Association.
