= Liutward =

Liutward was the archchancellor of the Carolingian Empire from 878 and the bishop of Vercelli from 880 by appointment of Charles the Fat. Never liked by the nobility, he was trusted by Charles as a confidant and go-between with the papacy.

In 887, he was accused by Charles of having an affair with the Empress Richardis and though the empress successfully underwent the ordeal of fire, he was banished from court. Liutward's men abducted the daughter of Unroch III of Friuli from a convent in Brescia and forced her to marry one of his relatives. This provoked enmity between Liutward, the chief Carolingian prelate in Lombardy, and Berengar of Friuli, the chief secular magnate.

The famed poet of the age, Notker of St Gall, dedicated a series of verses to him between the years 881 and 887.

== Sources ==
- MacLean, Simon. Kingship and Politics in the Late Ninth Century: Charles the Fat and the end of the Carolingian Empire. Cambridge University Press: 2003.
- Leyser, Karl. Communications and Power in Medieval Europe: The Carolingian and Ottonian Centuries. London, 1994.
- Reuter, Timothy. Germany in the Early Middle Ages, c. 800-1056. Longman, 1991.
- Duckett, Eleanor. Death and Life in the Tenth Century. University of Michigan Press, 1968.
- Annales Fuldenses translated by Timothy Reuter, with commentary (subscription needed).
