= TER Alsace =

Train network of the former Alsace region (France)

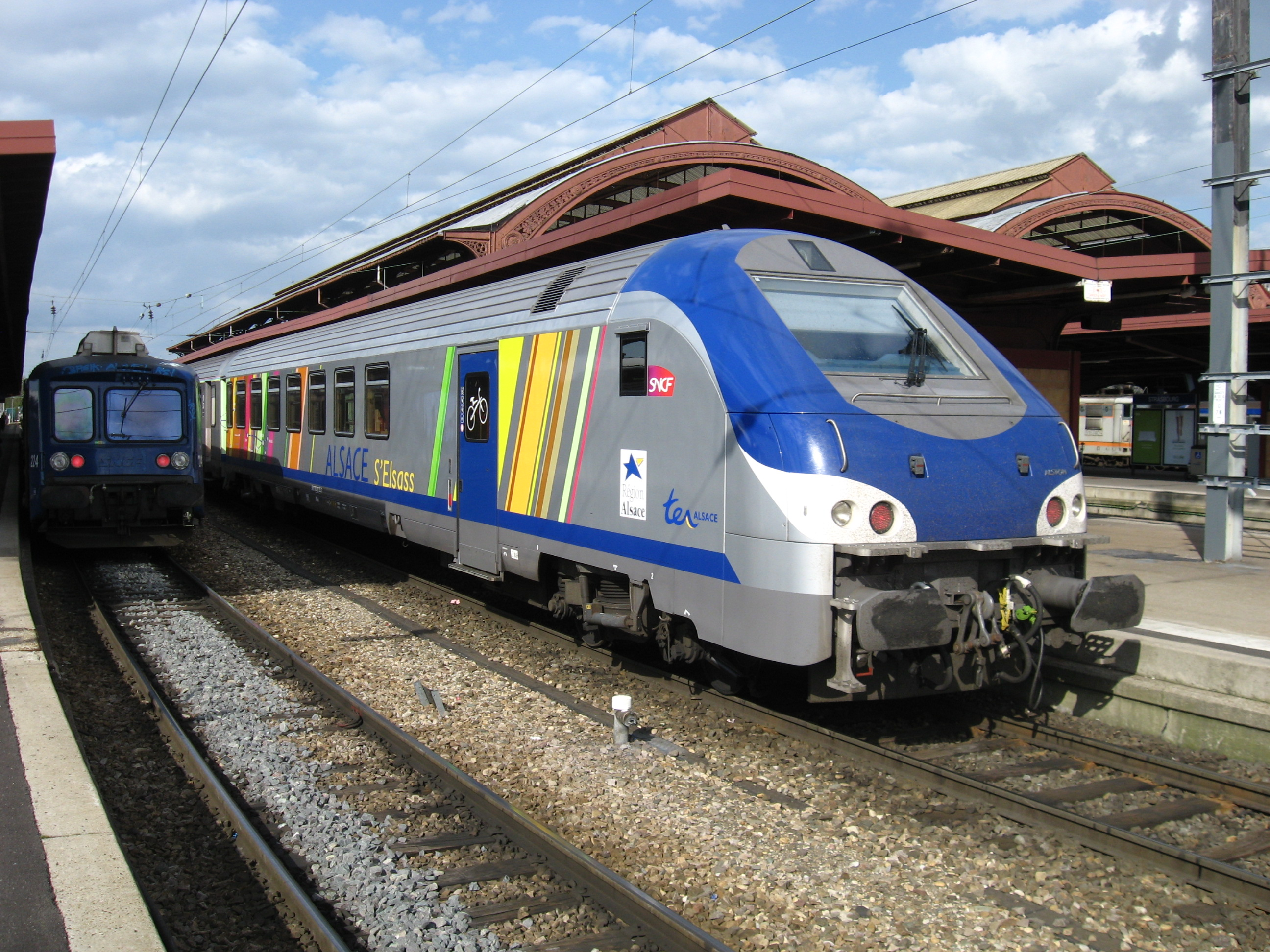
- TER 200 driving trailer at Strasbourg-Ville station

Overview
- Owner: SNCF
- Area served: Alsace, France
- Transit type: TER
- Line number: 26
- Number of stations: 164
- Daily ridership: 77 000
- Website: http://www.sncf.com/en/trains/ter

Operation
- Began operation: 1986
- Ended operation: 11 December 2016
- Operator: SNCF

Technical
- System length: 628 km
- Track gauge: 1,435 mm (4 ft 8 1/2 in) standard gauge

TER Alsace was the regional rail network serving the région of Alsace, eastern France. In 2016 it was merged into the new TER Grand Est.

== Network ==
=== Rail ===
| Line | Route | Frequency | Notes |
|---|---|---|---|
| 1 | Strasbourg – Sélestat – Colmar – Mulhouse – Saint-Louis – Basel SBB/SNCF (Switzerland) | | TER 200 high speed service |
| 2 | Strasbourg ... Sélestat ... Colmar ... Mulhouse | | |
| 3 | Strasbourg ... Mommenheim ... Saverne ... Sarrebourg | | |
| 4 | Strasbourg ... Haguenau ... Wissembourg | | |
| 5 | Strasbourg ... Haguenau ... Niederbronn | | |
| 6 (23) | Strasbourg ... Obermodern ... Sarreguemines ... Saarbrücken (Germany) | | |
| 7 | Strasbourg ... Molsheim ... Barr ... Sélestat | | |
| 8 (18) | Strasbourg ... Molsheim ... Saales ... Saint-Dié-des-Vosges | | |
| 9 | Strasbourg ... Herrlisheim ... Lauterbourg | | |
| 10 | Lauterbourg ... Wörth am Rhein (Germany) | | |
| 11 | Strasbourg – Krimmeri-Meinau – Kehl (Germany) – Appenweier – Offenburg | | |
| 12 (13, 14) | Strasbourg – Saverne – Sarrebourg – Nancy/Metz (see TER Lorraine lines 21 and 23 for details) | | |
| 15 | Mulhouse ... Saint-Louis ... Basel SBB/SNCF (Switzerland) | | |
| 16 | Mulhouse ... Altkirch ... Belfort | | |
| 17 | Mulhouse ... Cernay ... Thann ... Kruth | | |
| 19 | Colmar ... Turckheim ... Munster ... Metzeral | | |
| 22 | Sarreguemines ... Sarralbe ... Sarre-Union | | |
† Not all trains call at this station

=== Road ===
- Cernay – Sewen
- Colmar – Turckheim – Munster – Metzeral
- Colmar – Volgelsheim
- Haguenau – Niederbronn – Bitche
- Haguenau – Obermodern-Zutzendorf – Saverne
- Ingwiller – Wimmenau – Lichtenberg
- Mommenheim – Obermodern-Zutzendorf
- Sarrebourg – Réding
- Sarre-Union – Sarrebourg
- Frohmuhl – Obermodern-Zutzendorf – Saverne
- Sélestat – Sainte-Marie-aux-Mines – Saint-Dié
- Obermodern-Zutzendorf – Bouxwiller

== Rolling stock ==
Map of TER Alsace

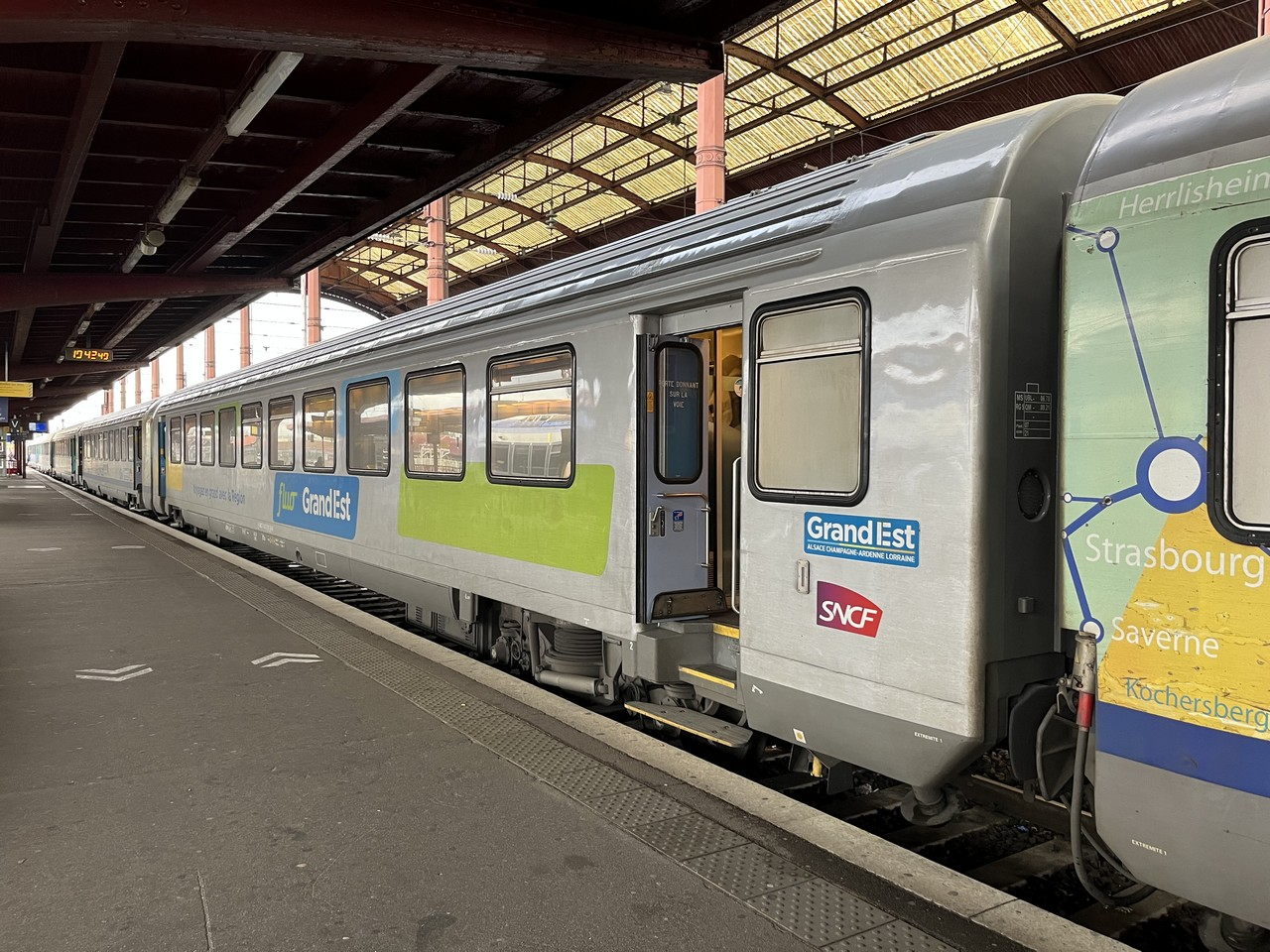
a Corail carriage wearing the new Fluo Grand Est livery.

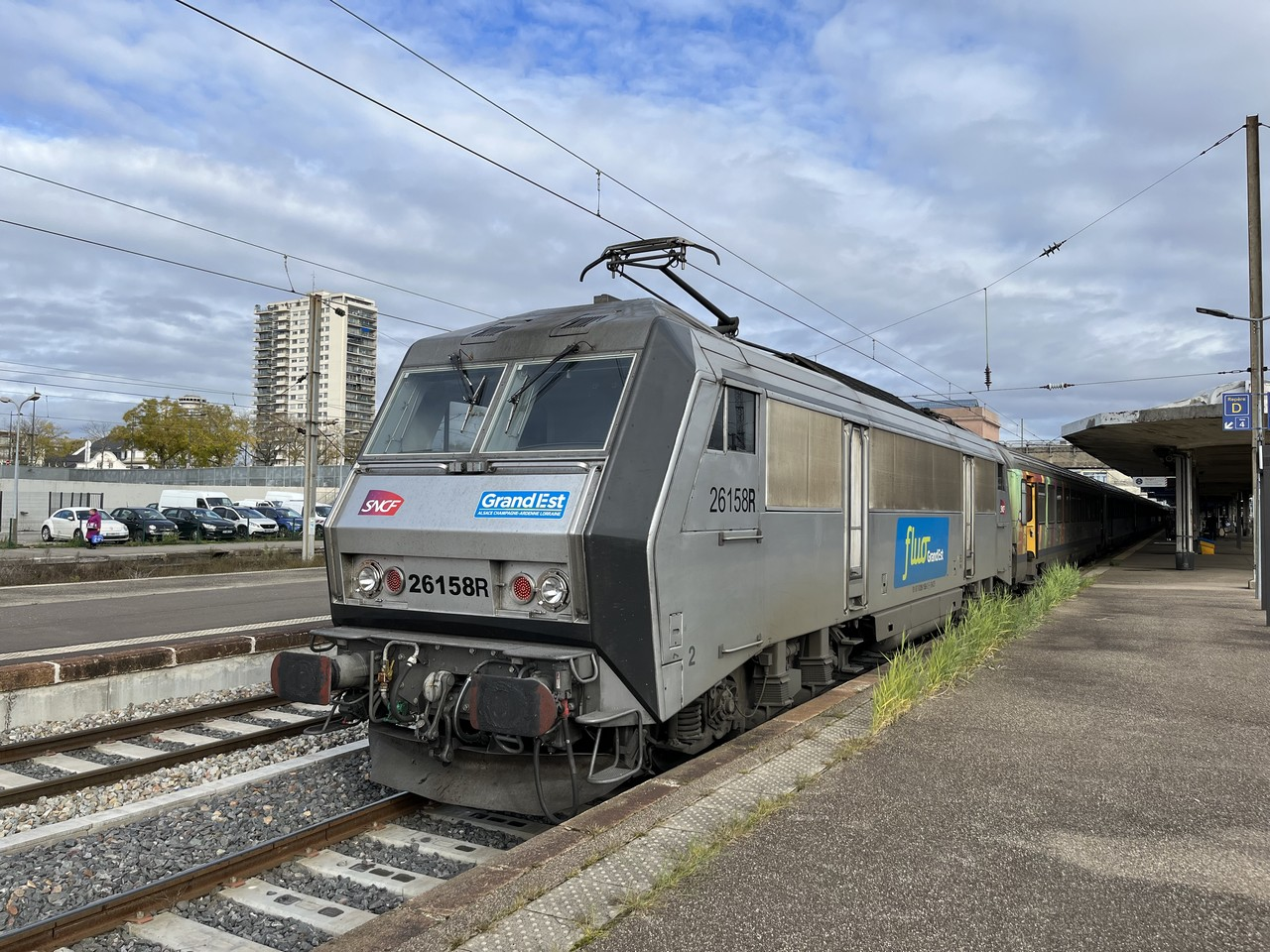
26158 drive engine wearing the new black TER livery with the Fluo Grand Est logo.

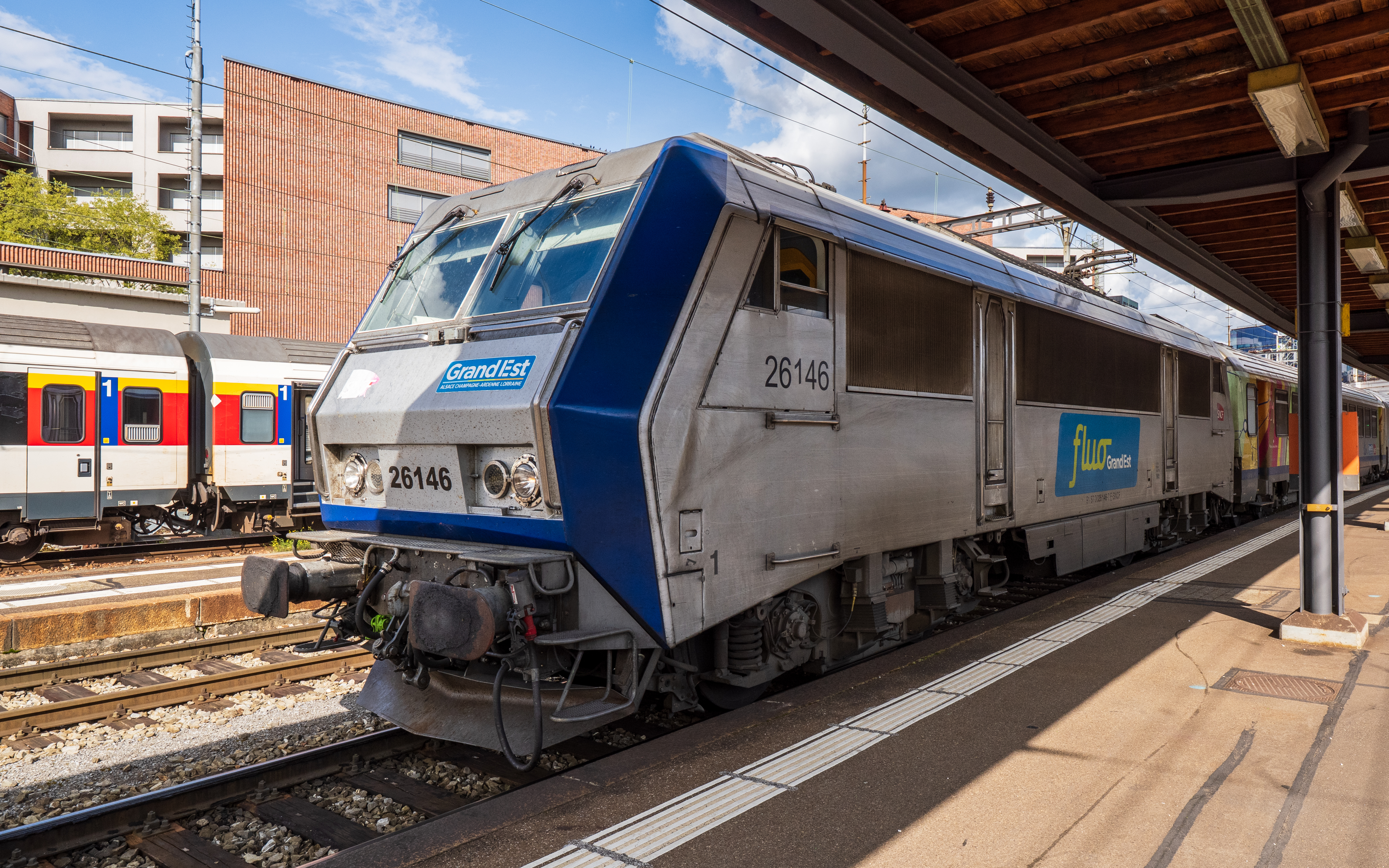
a Fluo Grand Est locomotiv at Basel SNCF station

=== Multiple units ===
- SNCF Class Z 11500
- SNCF Class Z 27500
- SNCF Class X 73500
- SNCF Class X 73900 (generally used on lines to Germany)
- SNCF Class X 76500
- SNCF Class B 82500

=== Locomotives ===
- SNCF Class BB 25500
- SNCF Class BB 26000
- SNCF Class BB 67400

== Future ==
The TER Alsace continues its development. Some old lines will be opened again, and new trains have been ordered (Alstom Régiolis) and will be delivered in 2013–2014.

At the same time, the region is currently putting in place Alséo, a magnetic card allowing access not only to the urban transport networks of Strasbourg, Colmar and Mulhouse, but also the TER network.

== Tram-train ==
The Thur valley tram-train, between Mulhouse and Thann, began operation in December 2010 with Siemens Avanto rolling stock.

A tram-train between Strasbourg, Molsheim and Barr has also been proposed but won't be realized before 2018

== See also ==
- SNCF
- Transport express régional
- Réseau Ferré de France
- List of SNCF stations in Alsace
- Alsace
