= Moder (river) =

River in France

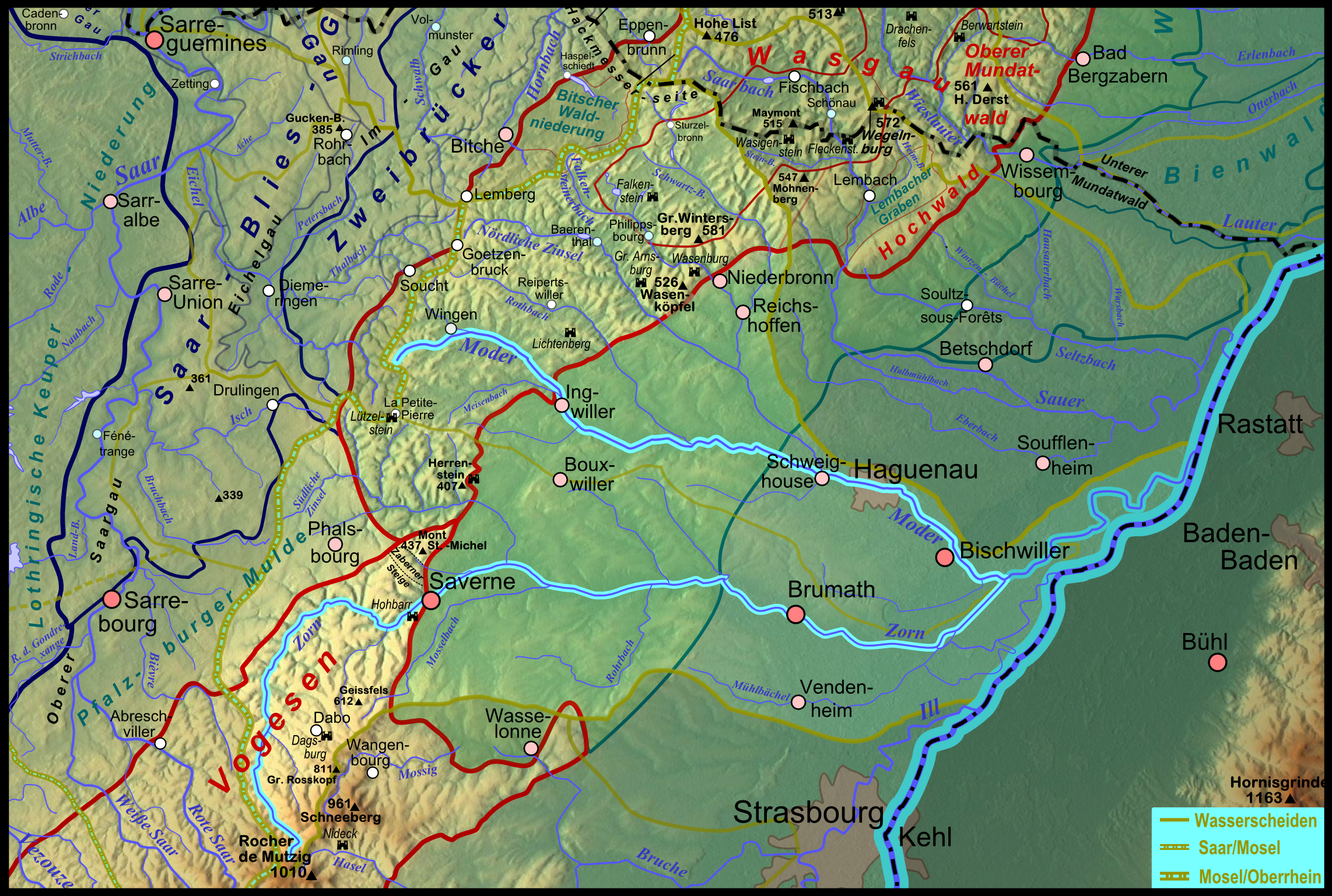
- Map of the Moder's drainage basin

Location
- Country: France

Physical characteristics
- Source
  - location: Moderfeld
  - coordinates: 48°53′44″N 07°18′58″E
  - elevation: 330 m (1,080 ft)
- Mouth
  - location: Rhine
  - coordinates: 48°50′13″N 08°06′12″E
  - elevation: 115 m (377 ft)
- Length: 82.1 km (51.0 mi)
- Basin size: 1,720 km^{2} (660 sq mi)
- Discharge
  - average: 16.6 m^{3}/s (590 cu ft/s)

Basin features
- Progression: Rhine→ North Sea
- Tributaries
  - right: Zorn

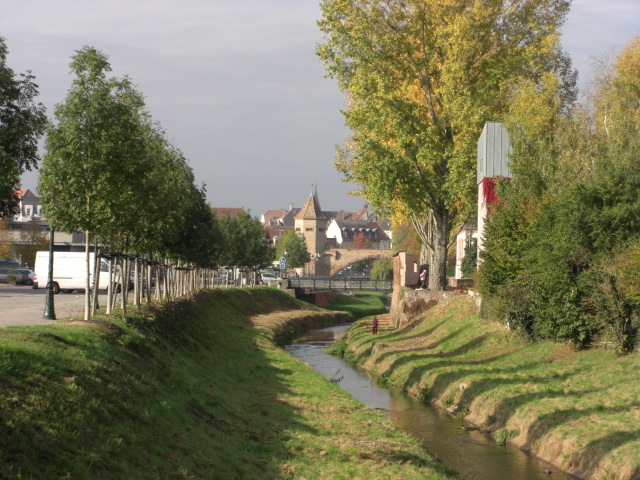
The Moder at Haguenau

The Moder (French: la Moder, [mɔdɛʁ]; German: die Moder) is a river in northeastern France; it begins in Zittersheim and ends at the river Rhine. It is 82.1 km (51.0 mi) long.

== Etymology ==
The name of the river comes from Matrae—the Gallic river goddess.

== Course ==
Its source of the Moder is near the hamlet Moderfeld, in the commune of Zittersheim. It joins the Rhine near the Iffezheim Lock, in Germany. The four primary tributaries of the Moder are the Zinsel du Nord, Zorn, Rothbach, and Soultzbach.

The river passes through the following communes:

- Zittersheim
- Wingen-sur-Moder
- Wimmenau
- Ingwiller
- Menchhoffen
- Schillersdorf
- Obermodern-Zutzendorf
- Schalkendorf
- La Walck
- Pfaffenhoffen
- Uberach
- Niedermodern
- Dauendorf
- Ohlungen
- Schweighouse-sur-Moder
- Haguenau
- Kaltenhouse
- Oberhoffen-sur-Moder
- Bischwiller
- Rohrwiller
- Drusenheim
- Sessenheim
- Dalhunden
- Stattmatten
- Auenheim
- Fort-Louis
- Rœschwoog
- Neuhaeusel
