= TER Lorraine =

Former regional rail network in Lorraine, France

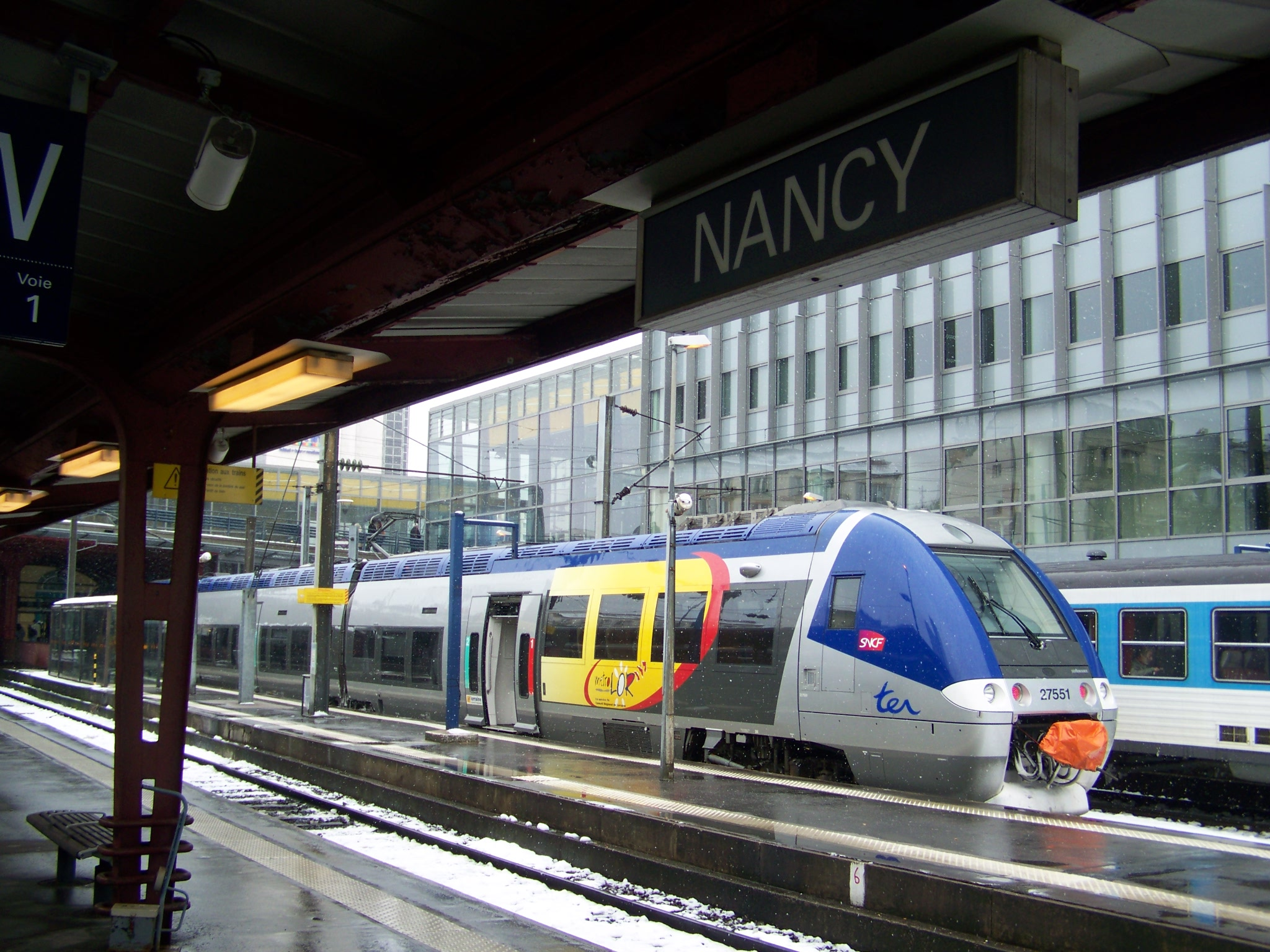
- Z 27500 in TER Lorraine branding, at Nancy-Ville station.

Overview
- Website: http://www.ter.sncf.com/lorraine

Technical
- Track gauge: 1,435 mm (4 ft 8 1/2 in) standard gauge

TER Lorraine was the regional rail network serving Lorraine region, France. In 2016 it was merged into the new TER Grand Est.

== Network ==
=== Rail ===
Line	Route	Frequency	Notes
1	Nancy ... Pont-à-Mousson ... Metz ... Thionville ... Luxembourg		
2	Thionville ... Apach		
3	Thionville ... Bouzonville		
4	Nancy ... Blainville-Damelevières ... Épinal ... Remiremont		
5	Nancy ... Épinal ... Lure ... Belfort		
6	Nancy ... Mirecourt ... Contrexéville ... Merrey – Culmont-Chalindrey		
7	Nancy ... Toul – Neufchâteau		
11 (12)	Nancy ... Blainville-Damelevières ... Lunéville ... Saint-Dié-des-Vosges		
13	Épinal ... Bruyères ... Saint-Dié-des-Vosges		
15	Metz ... Rémilly ... Forbach – Saarbrücken		
17	Béning ... Sarreguemines ... Bitche		
18	Sarreguemines ... Sarre-Union (see TER Alsace line 22 for details)		
20	Strasbourg ... Sarreguemines ... Saarbrücken (see TER Alsace line 6 for details)		
21 (22)	Metz ... Morhange ... Réding ... Saverne ... Strasbourg		
23	Nancy ... Lunéville ... Sarrebourg ... Saverne ... Strasbourg		
25	Nancy – Pont-à-Mousson ... Onville – Conflans-Jarny ... Longuyon – Longwy		
26	Charleville-Mézières ... Sedan ... Montmédy – Longuyon – Longwy		
27	Metz – Hagondange† – Hayange – Audun-le-Roman – Longuyon – Longwy		
28	Metz – Onville – Bar-le-Duc		
29	Nancy ... Toul ... Bar-le-Duc – Revigny ... Châlons-en-Champagne – Épernay – Reims		
30	Metz ... Hagondange ... Conflans-Jarny ... Verdun		
31	Thionville ... Esch-sur-Alzette ... Longwy		
† Not all trains call at this station

=== Road ===
- Thionville – Bouzonville – Creutzwald
- Remiremont – Bussang
- Remiremont – La Bresse – Gérardmer
- Épinal – Mirecourt – Vittel – Neufchâteau
- Lunéville – Rambervillers – Bruyères
- Béning – Sarreguemines – Bitche
- Sarre-Union – Sarrebourg
- Bitche – Haguenau

== Rolling stock ==
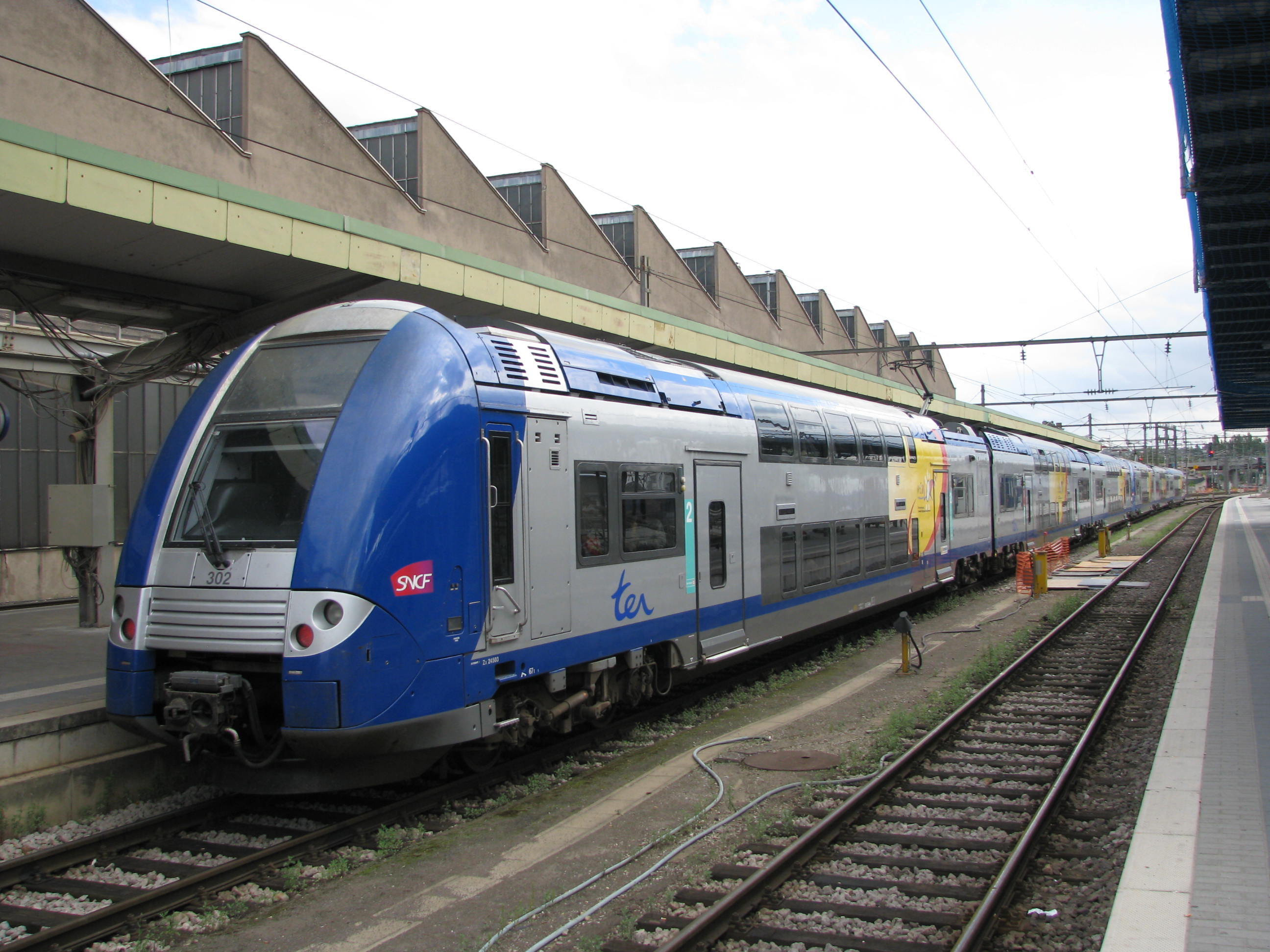
SNCF Class Z 24500 operated on TER Lorraine network at Luxembourg railway station

=== Multiple units ===
- SNCF Class Z 6300
- SNCF Class Z 11500
- SNCF Class Z 24500
- SNCF Class X 4300
- SNCF Class X 4750
- SNCF Class X 4790
- SNCF Class X 73900
- SNCF Class X 76500

=== Locomotives ===
- SNCF Class BB 15000
- SNCF Class BB 16500
- SNCF Class BB 66400
- SNCF Class Z 27500 on order

== See also ==
- SNCF
- Transport express régional
- Réseau Ferré de France
- List of SNCF stations in Lorraine
- Lorraine
