= Hinsbourg =

Hinsbourg Hínschburi
- Commune
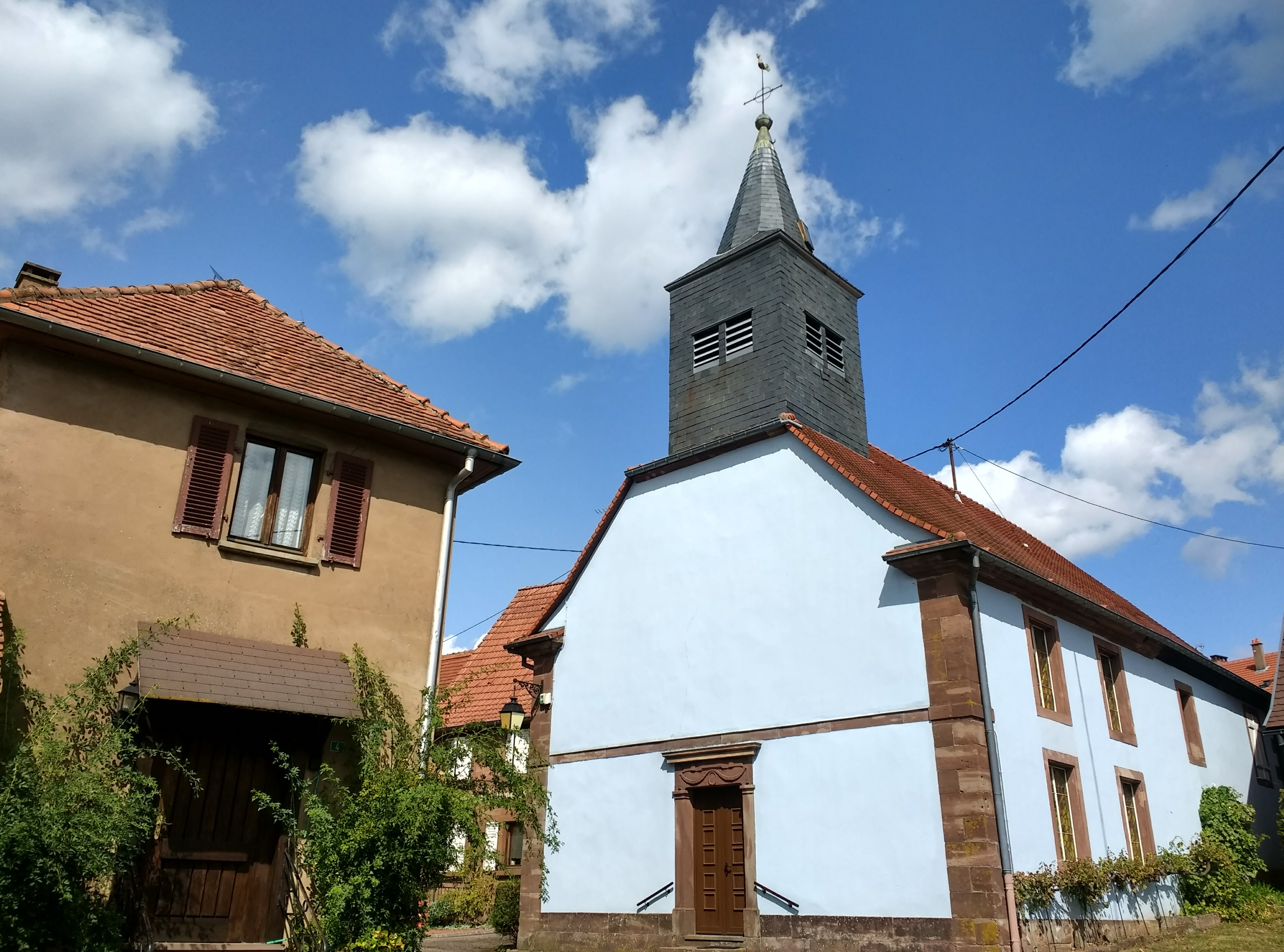
- The church in Hinsbourg

- Coat of arms
- Location of Hinsbourg
- Location within France Location within Grand Est
- Coordinates: 48°54′24″N 7°17′30″E
- Country: France
- Region: Grand Est
- Department: Bas-Rhin
- Arrondissement: Saverne
- Canton: Ingwiller

Government
  - Mayor (2020–2026): Gilbert Reutenauer
- Area^{1}: 3.28 km^{2} (1.27 sq mi)
- Highest elevation: 390 m (1,280 ft)
- Lowest elevation: 247 m (810 ft)
- Population (2023): 122
  - Density: 37.2/km^{2} (96.3/sq mi)
- Time zone: UTC+01:00 (CET)
  - Summer (DST): UTC+02:00 (CEST)
- INSEE/Postal code: 67198 /67290
- ^{1} French Land Register data, which excludes lakes, ponds, glaciers > 1 km^{2} (0.386 sq mi or 247 acres) and river estuaries.

Hinsbourg (French pronunciation: [insbuʁ]; German: Hinsburg) is a commune in the Bas-Rhin department in Grand Est in north-eastern France.

== Geography ==
Hinsbourg is positioned in the north of Alsace, some thirty kilometres (eighteen miles) through twisting mostly wooded roads to the north of Saverne, and within the Palatinate Forest-North Vosges Biosphere Reserve.

Surrounding communes are Puberg to the northeast, Zittersheim to the east, La Petite-Pierre to the southeast, Struth to the southwest and Frohmuhl to the west.

== See also ==
- Communes of the Bas-Rhin department
