= Johann Michael Bach (musician at Wuppertal) =

German composer, born 1745

- Born: 9 November 1745; Struth
- Died: 13 June 1820 (aged 74); Elberfeld
- Occupation(s): Composer; Lawyer; Music Theorist

Johann Michael Bach (9 November 1745 in Struth near Schmalkalden – 13 June 1820 in Elberfeld) was a German composer, lawyer and music theorist.

He was a son of Johann Elias Bach (1705–1755). He is not to be confused with his great-uncle Johann Michael Bach (1648–1694, brother of Johann Christoph Bach). He was active as a lawyer in Güstrow (Mecklenburg), then a music teacher at the high school in Elberfeld, Wuppertal.

His main theoretical work was his Kurze und systematische Anleitung zum General-Bass und der Tonkunst uberhaupt published at Kassel in 1780.

== Works ==
- Friedens-Cantata; Ingrid Schmithüsen, Howard Crook, Gotthold Schwarz, Klaus Mertens, Hermann Max; cpo 999 671-2, 2000
