= Val-de-Moder =

- Commune
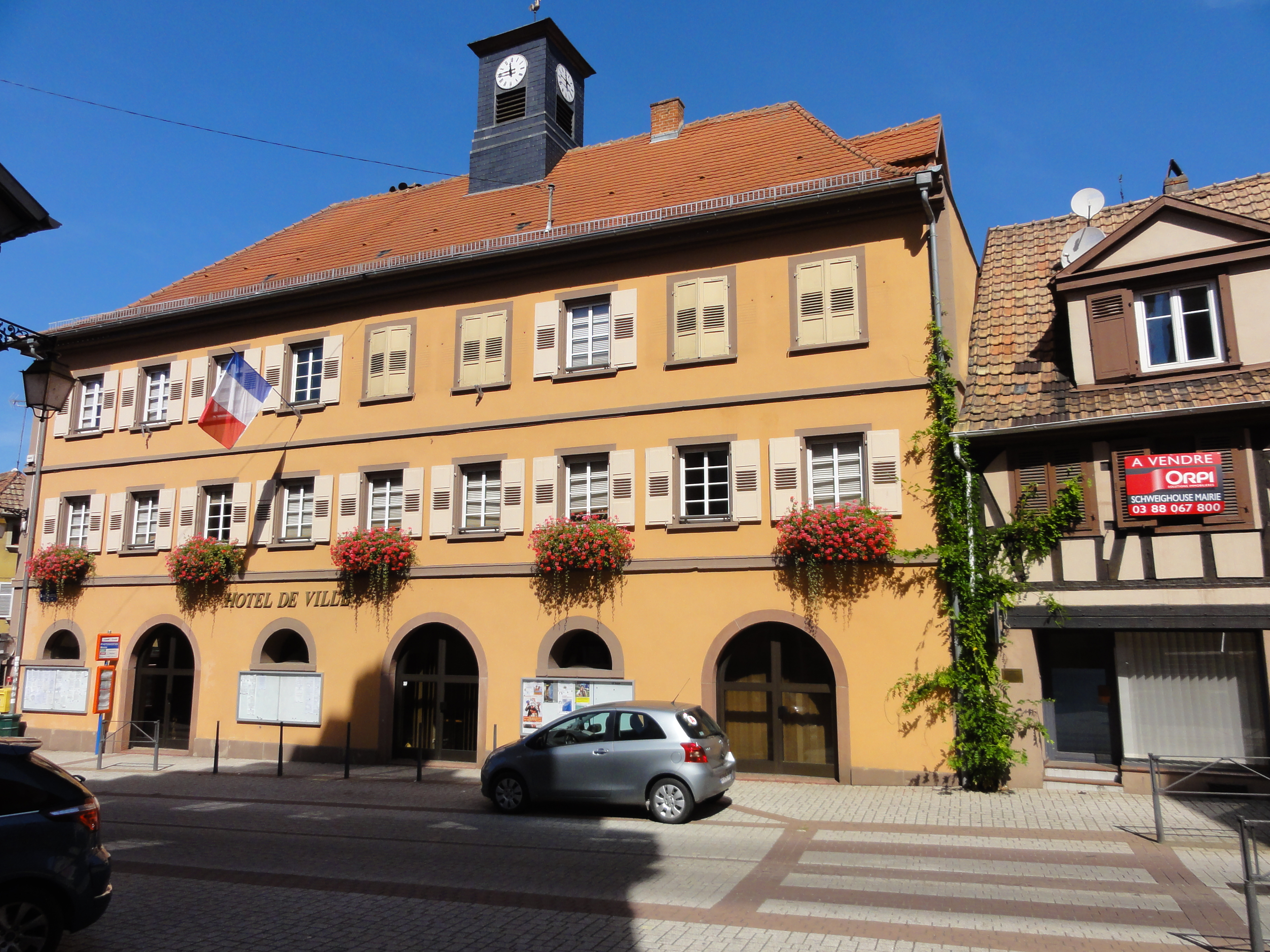
- The town hall in Pfaffenhoffen
- Location of Val-de-Moder
- Location within France Location within Grand Est
- Coordinates: 48°50′42″N 7°36′40″E
- Country: France
- Region: Grand Est
- Department: Bas-Rhin
- Arrondissement: Haguenau-Wissembourg
- Canton: Reichshoffen and Bouxwiller
- Intercommunality: CA Haguenau

Government
  - Mayor (2020–2026): Jean-Denis Enderlin
- Area^{1}: 9.01 km^{2} (3.48 sq mi)
- Highest elevation: 238 m (781 ft)
- Lowest elevation: 157 m (515 ft)
- Population (2023): 5,102
  - Density: 566/km^{2} (1,470/sq mi)
- Time zone: UTC+01:00 (CET)
  - Summer (DST): UTC+02:00 (CEST)
- INSEE/Postal code: 67372 /67350
- ^{1} French Land Register data, which excludes lakes, ponds, glaciers > 1 km^{2} (0.386 sq mi or 247 acres) and river estuaries.

Val-de-Moder (French pronunciation: [val də mɔdɛʁ], literally Vale of Moder) is a commune in the Bas-Rhin department of northeastern France. The municipality was established on 1 January 2016 by merger of the former communes of Pfaffenhoffen, Uberach and La Walck. On 1 January 2019, the former commune Ringeldorf was merged into Val-de-Moder.

== Population ==
The population data given in the table below refer to the commune in its geography as of January 2025.

Historical population
Year	Pop.	±% p.a.
1968	4,222	—
1975	4,507	+0.94%
1982	4,452	−0.18%
1990	4,415	−0.10%
1999	4,649	+0.58%
2007	5,180	+1.36%
2012	5,261	+0.31%
2017	5,096	−0.64%
2023	5,102	+0.02%
Source: INSEE

== See also ==
- Communes of the Bas-Rhin department
