= Joseph Heckel =

French footballer (1922–2011)

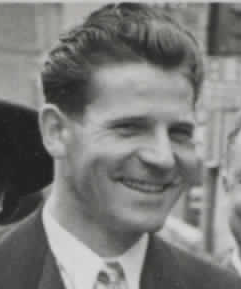
- Heckel in 1951

Personal information
- Date of birth: 7 July 1922
- Place of birth: La Walck, Bas-Rhin, France
- Date of death: 29 May 2011 (aged 88)
- Place of death: Strasbourg, Bas-Rhin, France

Senior career*
Years	Team	Apps	(Gls)
- FC La Walck
1945–1948	Strasbourg	31	(21)
1948–?	FC La Walck		

International career
1948	France	2	(0)

Managerial career
- 1960–1961: Strasbourg (sporting director)
- * Club domestic league appearances and goals

Joseph Heckel (7 July 1922 – 29 May 2011) was a French footballer. He competed in the men's tournament at the 1948 Summer Olympics.

== Club career ==
Heckel started his career at his hometown club FC La Walck and then played for Strasbourg from 1945 to 1948. He then went back to FC La Walck where he ended his career.

== International career ==
Heckel was selected in France Football squad for the 1948 Summer Olympics, and played France two Games against India and Great Britain, as France were eliminated in the Quarterfinals. He never had a cap with France senior team.

== Managerial career ==
From June 1960 to December 1961 Heckel was sporting director of Strasbourg.
