= Frédéric Adam =

French conductor, composer and administrator

- Born: January 4, 1904; Hinsbourg, Alsace, France
- Died: September 7, 1984 (aged 80); Illkirch-Graffenstaden, France
- Occupation(s): conductor, composer, opera administrator
- Years active: 1933–1972
- Known for: Director of the Opéra national du Rhin; French premieres of Wozzeck, Il prigioniero, A Midsummer Night's Dream, Die Frau ohne Schatten
- Notable work: Judith, Le Voyage vers l'étoile

Frédéric Adam (4 January 1904 – 7 September 1984) was a French conductor, composer and administrator.

== Career ==
Born in Hinsbourg, Alsace, Adam studied in Strasbourg and Paris. He became a répétiteur at the opera house in Strasbourg in 1933, remaining there until his retirement in 1972, including periods as co-director from 1955 to 1960 and director from 1960 to 1972. He conducted the final Théâtre Municipal production, Tristan und Isolde (where Wolfgang Windgassen sang his final Tristan in his own production on 27 April 1972) before the formation of the Opéra du Rhin.

Adam mounted the first productions in France of several notable operas including: Wozzeck (1959), Il prigioniero (1961), A Midsummer Night's Dream and Die Frau ohne Schatten (1965).

His compositions include ballets, symphonies and two operas, Judith (1948, Strasbourg) and Le Voyage vers l'étoile (1954, Strasbourg).

He died in Illkirch-Graffenstaden.
