= Bernard Vogler =

French historian and academic (1935–2020)

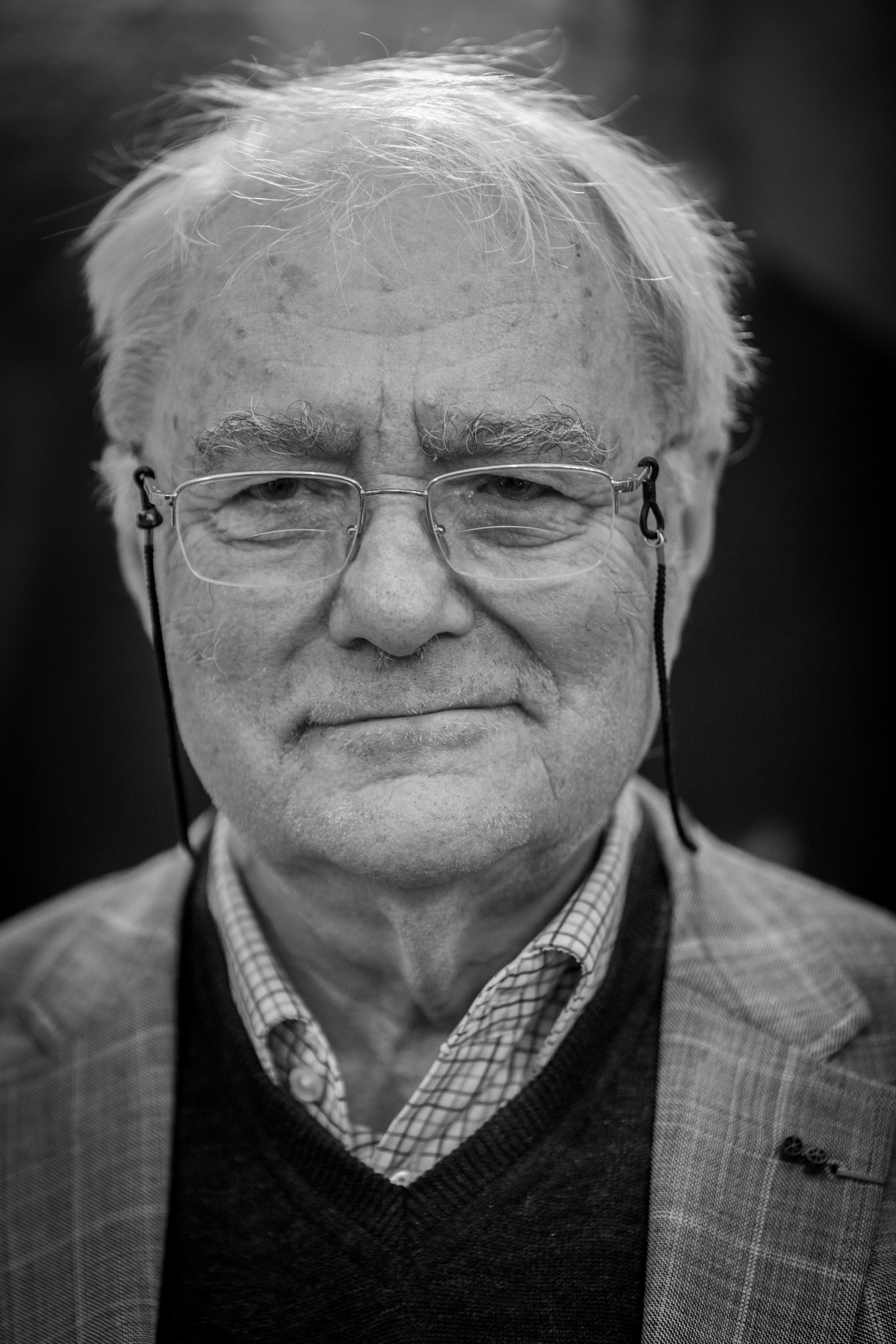
- Vogler in 2013
- Born: 30 April 1935; Obermodern-Zutzendorf, France
- Died: 2 December 2020 (aged 85); Strasbourg, France
- Occupations: Historian; Academic

Bernard Vogler (30 April 1935 – 2 December 2020) was a French academic and historian. A professor at the University of Strasbourg, he was a specialist in the history of Alsace from the 15th to the 20th centuries.

== Biography ==
Bernard was the son of carpenter Georges Vogler and Catherine Merckling. He married Chantal Fischer in 1960, an honorary lecturer in Roman history at the Lumière University Lyon 2. The couple would have six children.

Vogler completed his primary studies in German in Obermodern-Zutzendorf, and his secondary studies were in French at the Lycée Bouxwiller. He studied at the École normale d'instituteurs de Lyon from 1953 to 1955, and obtained his agrégation in 1960. He was a secondary school teacher in Colmar and Strasbourg, then was a researcher at the French National Centre for Scientific Research and became an assistant professor at Marc Bloch University from 1969 to 1976. He defended his doctoral thesis in 1976 at Paris-Sorbonne University in 1972, titled L’implantation des églises protestantes dans les pays palatins de 1556 à 1619. He worked as a researcher at the Institut d'histoire d'Alsace from 1976 to 2003 and directed the Centre de recherche régionale et rhénane from 1984 to 2003. He served as a guest professor in Neuchâtel and Stuttgart before becoming a professor emeritus in 2003.

Vogler was a member of the Comité des travaux historiques et scientifiques from 1989 to 2000 and was Vice-President of the International Commission for Comparative Ecclesiastical History from 1975 to 2001. He was President of the University of the Third Age from 2004 to 2008.

Bernard Vogler died in Strasbourg on 2 December 2020 at the age of 85.

== Distinctions ==
- Knight of the Legion of Honour
- Officer of the Ordre national du Mérite
- Officer of the Ordre des Palmes académiques
- Prix Strasbourg (1974)
- Prix-Marie-Eugène-Simon-Henri-Martin of the Académie Française (1977)
- Prix littéraire de l'Académie des Marches de l’Est (1994)
- Prix Georges-Goyau of the Académie Française (1994)
- Prix Flach of the Académie des Sciences Morales et Politiques (1995)
- Prix d’honneur des Amis du Vieux Strasbourg (2000)

== Publications ==
- Vie religieuse en pays rhénan dans la seconde moitié du 16e siècle (1555-1619) (1974)
- Le clergé protestant rhénan au siècle de la Réforme (1976)
- Le monde germanique et helvétique à l’époque des Réformes 1517-1618 (1981)
- Histoire de la Caisse d’Épargne de Strasbourg (1985)
- Histoire culturelle de l’Alsace (1993)
- Histoire des chrétiens d’Alsace des origines à nos jours (1994)
- Histoire politique de l’Alsace (1995)
- Histoire économique de l’Alsace (1997)
- L’Almanach de l’Alsace (2001)
- Strasbourg d’après-guerre (1945-1950) (2002)
- Nouvelle histoire de l’Alsace (2003)
- Journal de l’Alsace des origines à nos jours (2004)
- La Décapole. Dix villes libres alliées pour leurs libertés 1354-1679 (2009)
- Geschichte des Elsass (2012)
