= Frohmuhl =

Frohmuhl Frohmíl
- Commune
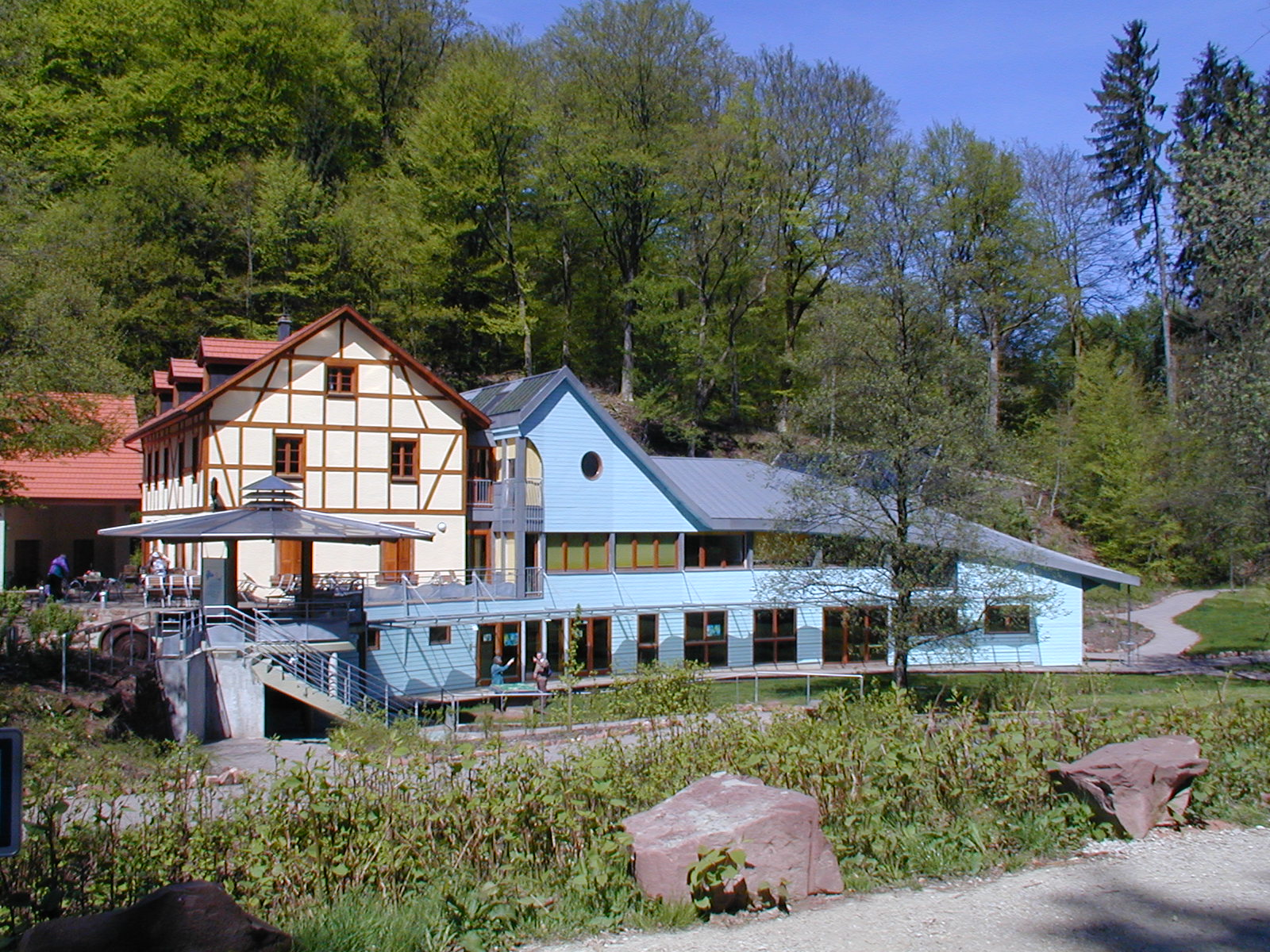
- The House of the Water and the River in Frohmuhl

- Coat of arms
- Location of Frohmuhl
- Location within France Location within Grand Est
- Coordinates: 48°54′36″N 7°16′57″E
- Country: France
- Region: Grand Est
- Department: Bas-Rhin
- Arrondissement: Saverne
- Canton: Ingwiller

Government
  - Mayor (2020–2026): Didier Follenius
- Area^{1}: 1.64 km^{2} (0.63 sq mi)
- Highest elevation: 359 m (1,178 ft)
- Lowest elevation: 247 m (810 ft)
- Population (2023): 156
  - Density: 95.1/km^{2} (246/sq mi)
- Time zone: UTC+01:00 (CET)
  - Summer (DST): UTC+02:00 (CEST)
- INSEE/Postal code: 67148 /67290
- ^{1} French Land Register data, which excludes lakes, ponds, glaciers > 1 km^{2} (0.386 sq mi or 247 acres) and river estuaries.

Frohmuhl (French pronunciation: [fʁomyl]; German: Frohmühl) is a commune in the Bas-Rhin department in Grand Est in north-eastern France.

The commune lies within the Northern Vosges Regional Nature Park.

== Geography ==
A typical valley village set in the pink Lorraine Plateau sandstone, Frohmuhl, like many villages in north-western Alsace, is cut in two by the railway line connecting Strasbourg and Sarreguemines and by the River Eichel. Road access is provided by the departmental road D919.

Agriculture was abandoned here during the second half of the twentieth and the surrounding hills are newly afforested. However, Highland Cattle are currently reared in residual open areas at the bottom of the valley.

Adjacent communes are Puberg and Hinsbourg to the east, Struth and Tieffenbach to the south-west and Weislingen to the north-west.

== See also ==
- Communes of the Bas-Rhin department
