= Wimmenau =

Wimmenau Wìmmenau
- Commune
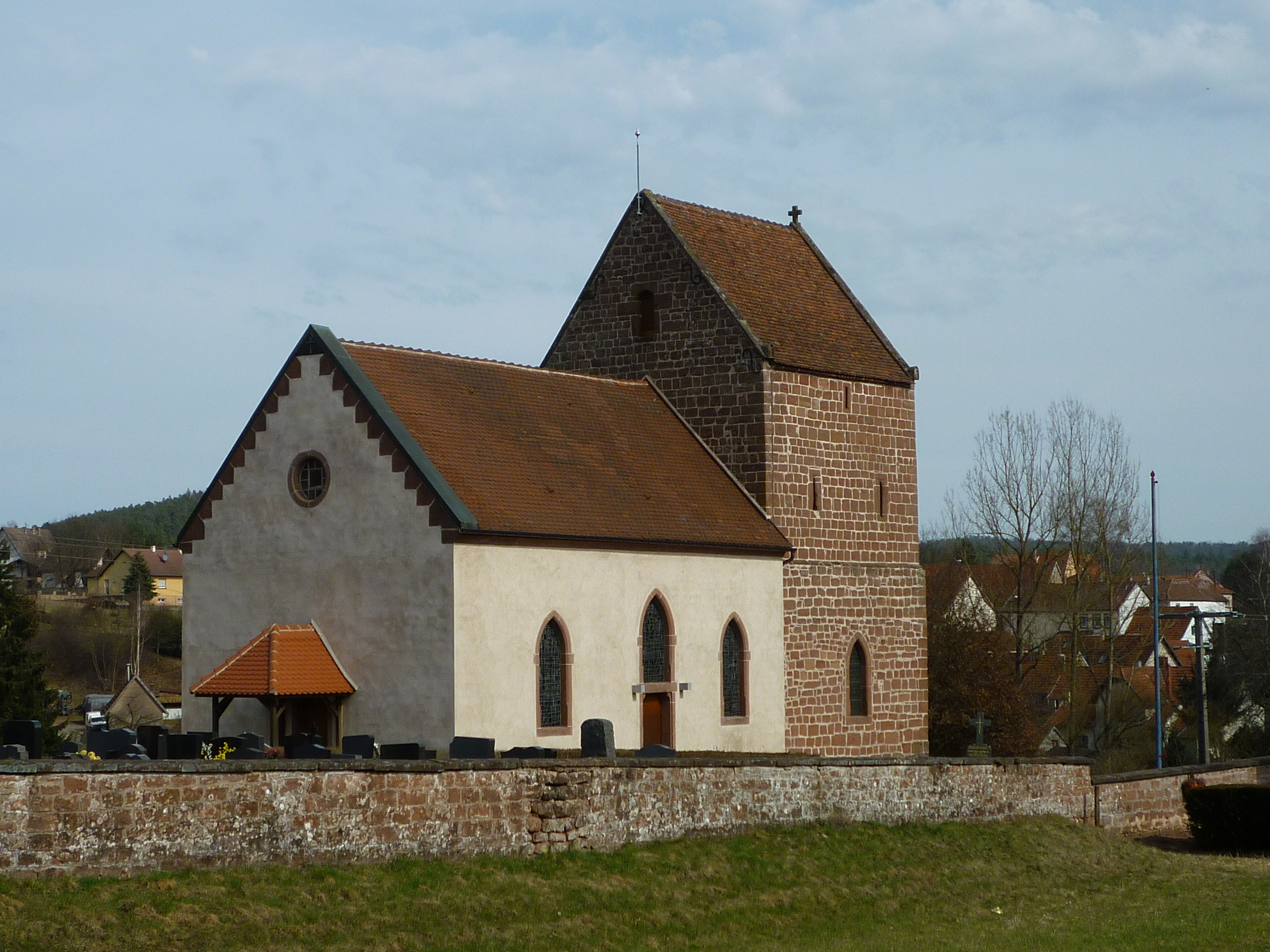
- Église Saint-André (Church of Saint Andrew), erected in 1681.

- Coat of arms
- Location of Wimmenau
- Location within France Location within Grand Est
- Coordinates: 48°54′47″N 7°25′26″E
- Country: France
- Region: Grand Est
- Department: Bas-Rhin
- Arrondissement: Saverne
- Canton: Ingwiller
- Intercommunality: Hanau-La Petite Pierre

Government
  - Mayor (2020–2026): Gilbert Sand
- Area^{1}: 20.76 km^{2} (8.02 sq mi)
- Elevation: 205 m (673 ft)
- Highest elevation: 413 m (1,355 ft)
- Lowest elevation: 197 m (646 ft)
- Population (2023): 1,070
  - Density: 51.5/km^{2} (133/sq mi)
- Time zone: UTC+01:00 (CET)
  - Summer (DST): UTC+02:00 (CEST)
- INSEE/Postal code: 67535 /67290
- Website: www.wimmenau.fr
- ^{1} French Land Register data, which excludes lakes, ponds, glaciers > 1 km^{2} (0.386 sq mi or 247 acres) and river estuaries.

Wimmenau (French pronunciation: [viməno] or [vimənau]) is a commune in the Bas-Rhin department in Grand Est in north-eastern France.

== History ==
Wimmenau is located at the crossroads of an ancient Celtic road from Haguenau to Sarre-Union and an ancient Roman road from Strasbourg to Saarbrücken. It was mentioned for the first time in 836 (as Wimmenawe). In 1365, during the Hundred Years War, a hill near the village was used by English soldiers to monitor the Sparsbach and Moder Valleys and named "Englishberg".

The village was levelled during the Thirty Years War (1618–1648), except for the bell-tower of the Church of Saint Andrew, and was resettled by Swiss immigrants from the Bern area in the mid-seventeenth century. From 1637-1655, there was not a single bourgeois (inhabitant paying the citizen tax) in the town, which had 30 bourgeois before the war. (Note: The commune's website says: "Before the Thirty Years War began in 1618, Wimmenau had 30 inhabitants...The last of the inhabitants sought refuge in Ingwiller and left the town uninhabited from 1637 to 1655." (French: "Lorsque la guerre de 30 Ans éclata en 1618, Wimmenau comptait 30 habitants...Les derniers habitants se réfugièrent à Ingwiller et laissèrent le village inoccupé de 1637 à 1655.")) As with most of the Alsace region, Wimmenau came under the rule of France in 1680. The lack of farmland led to the emigration of many of the commune's inhabitants to the United States and Argentina during the nineteenth century. Alsace became part of the German Empire through the Treaty of Frankfurt in 1871, but was returned to France by the Treaty of Versailles in 1919. The town came under German administration again during World War II until it was liberated by American troops on 5–6 December 1944.

The town contains two national heritage sites (monuments historique). The Church of Saint Andrew (Église Saint-André), also known as the Protestant Church (Église protestante), was designated as a monument historique in 1995. Its bell-tower and chancel dates to the 12th century and was equipped with a ribbed vault in the 15th century. The church's nave—main building—was rebuilt after 1681 and expanded in 1878. A house built in 1669 (with additions in 1718) by the Scherer (Note: Also spelled Sheer.) brothers—Swiss immigrants—with an adjacent oil mill dating to 1837 was added in 1984. The Scherer house, oil mill, and a few additional outbuildings form a complex which house historical artifacts related to rural life in the area.

== Geography ==
The commune lies along the Moder River; other waterways in the commune are the Rothbach and Rosteig Streams. It is entirely within the Northern Vosges Regional Nature Park. It lies between 197 and 413 m elevation; the average elevation is 205 m.

=== Climate ===
Wimmenau experiences an average of 1635 hours of sunshine a year (the average for France is 1900 hours).

== Population ==
Historical population
Year	Pop.	±% p.a.
1968	860	—
1975	864	+0.07%
1982	900	+0.58%
1990	1,012	+1.48%
1999	1,050	+0.41%
2007	1,130	+0.92%
2012	1,133	+0.05%
2017	1,081	−0.94%
2023	1,070	−0.17%
Source: INSEE

Inhabitants are known as Wimmenauviens (males) or Wimmenauviennes (females). The hamlet of Kohlhuette is divided between the communes of Wimmenau and Wingen-sur-Moder.

== Transport ==
Wimmenau lies along route D919—named Route Principale (Main Road) while passing through the town—connects the town of Wimmenau with Wingen-sur-Moder to the northwest and Ingwiller to the southeast. Route D12 connects the town of Wimmenau with the hamlet of Kohlhuette. Route D157 connects the town of Wimmenau with Reipertswiller.

The town of Wimmenau lies along the Mommenheim-Sarreguemines rail line, which connects the cities of Strasbourg, France to Saarbrücken, Germany. The rail line was built during German rule by the General Division of the Imperial Railways in Alsace-Lorraine; the section through Wimmenau opened 1 May 1895. TER Grand Est, a Train Express Régional operated by SNCF, operates on this line. There is no railway station in Wimmenau; TER Grand Est serves Wimmenau with bus service connecting to rail service at Wingen-sur-Moder and Ingwiller.

== Notable residents ==
Politician Philippe Richert grew up in Wimmenau. He has served as senator for Bas-Rhin (1992–2010) and is the current president of the Alsace Regional Council (2010–present).
