= Ringeldorf =

- Part of Val-de-Moder
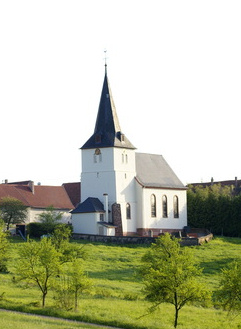

- Coat of arms
- Location of Ringeldorf
- Location within France Location within Grand Est
- Coordinates: 48°49′34″N 7°36′31″E
- Country: France
- Region: Grand Est
- Department: Bas-Rhin
- Arrondissement: Haguenau-Wissembourg
- Canton: Bouxwiller
- Commune: Val-de-Moder
- Area^{1}: 2.78 km^{2} (1.07 sq mi)
- Highest elevation: 298 m (978 ft)
- Lowest elevation: 205 m (673 ft)
- Population (2022): 133
  - Density: 47.8/km^{2} (124/sq mi)
- Time zone: UTC+01:00 (CET)
  - Summer (DST): UTC+02:00 (CEST)
- Postal code: 67350
- ^{1} French Land Register data, which excludes lakes, ponds, glaciers > 1 km^{2} (0.386 sq mi or 247 acres) and river estuaries.

Ringeldorf (French pronunciation: [ʁiŋ(ɡ)əldɔʁf]; Alsatian: Rìngeldorf) is a former commune in the Bas-Rhin department in Grand Est in north-eastern France. On 1 January 2019, it was merged into the commune Val-de-Moder.

== See also ==
- Communes of the Bas-Rhin department
