= Zorn (river) =

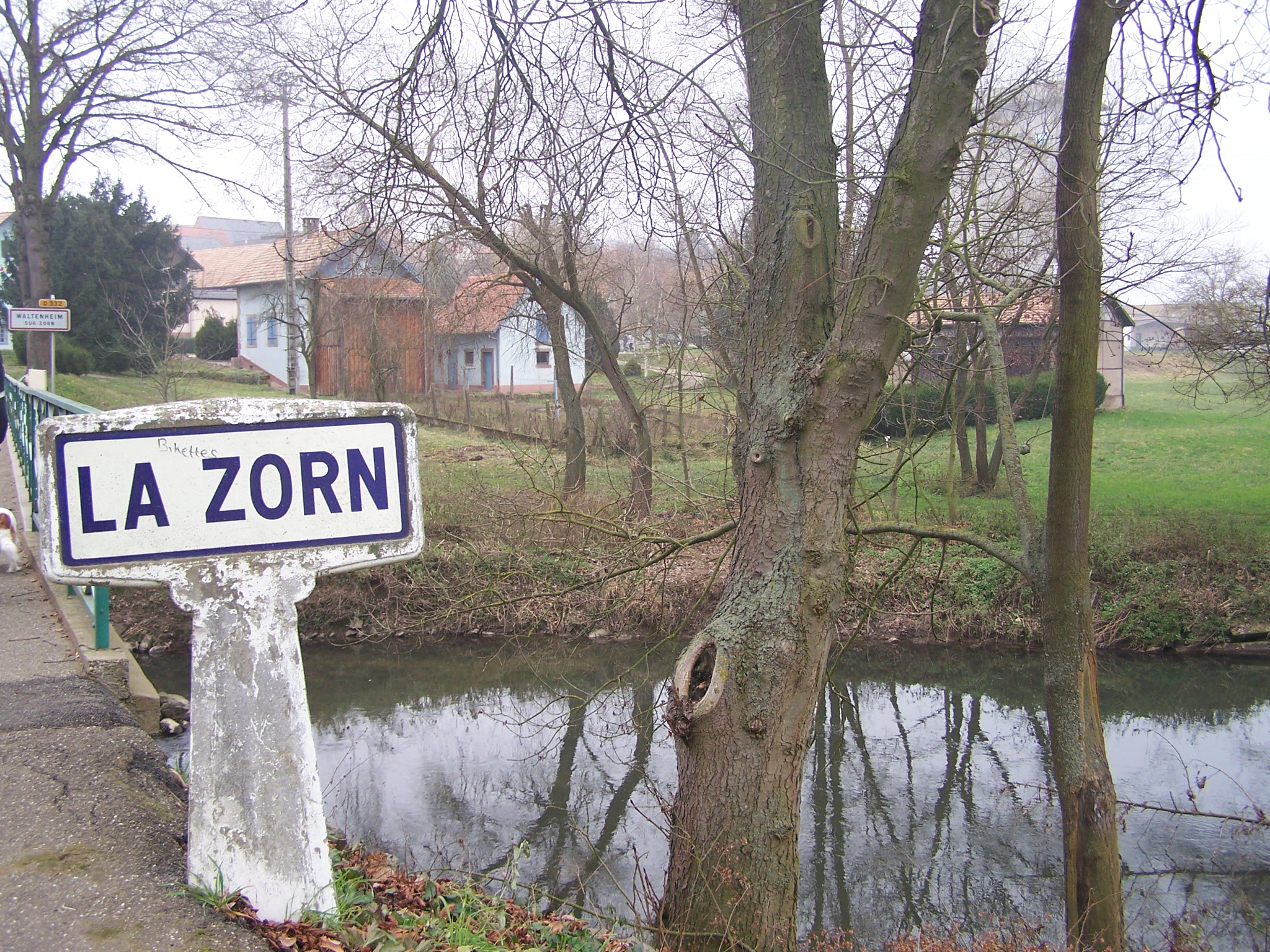
- The Zorn near Waltenheim-sur-Zorn

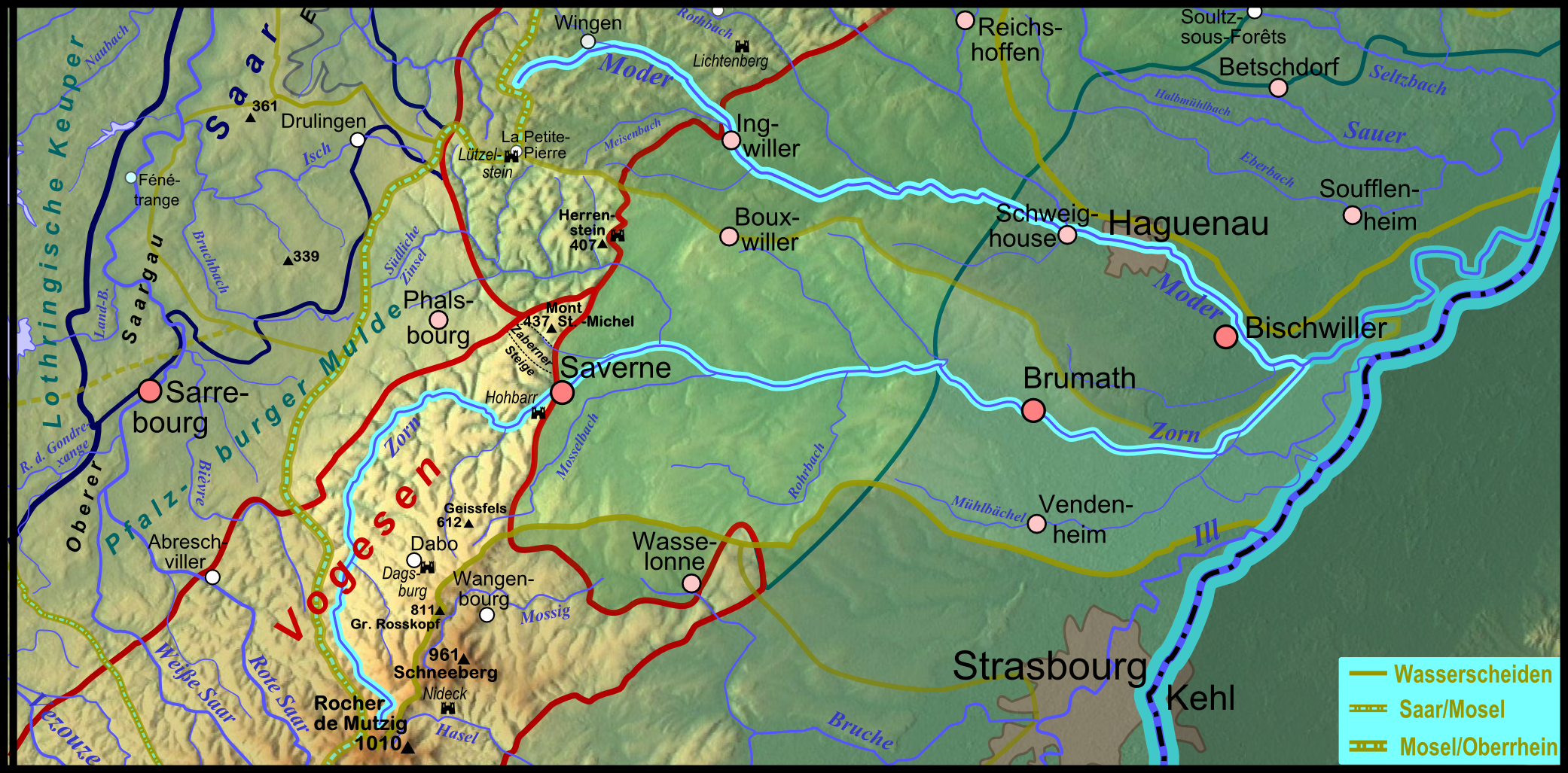
- Map of the catchment area

Location
- Country: France
- Region: Grand Est
- Reference no.: FR: "A34-0200" (in French). Sandre.

Physical characteristics
- Source
  - location: In the central Vosges, in the department of Moselle
  - coordinates: 48°33′54″N 7°13′21″E
  - elevation: ca. 830 m
- Mouth
  - location: Near Rohrwiller into the Moder
  - coordinates: 48°45′07″N 7°54′57″E
  - elevation: ca. 120 m
- Length: 97 km
- Basin size: 757.2 km^{2} (292.4 sq mi)
- Discharge
  - location: mouth
  - average: 5.91 m^{3}/s (209 cu ft/s)

Basin features
- Progression: Moder→ Rhine→ North Sea
- Landmarks: Small towns: Saverne, Brumath
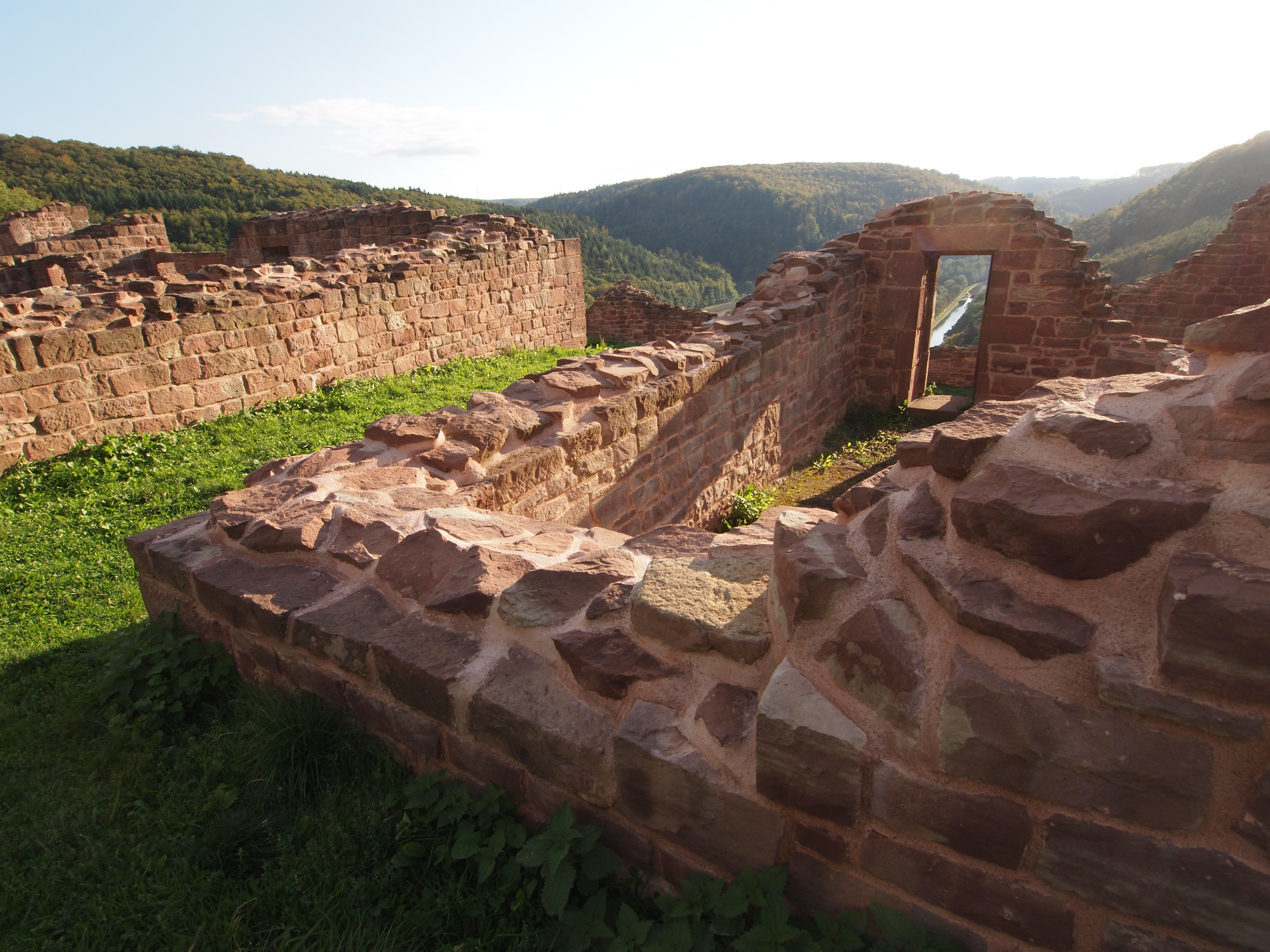
- Lützelburg castle above the upper reaches of the Zorn

The Zorn is a river that flows through the Lorraine and the Alsace as the largest and last of the tributaries of the river Moder, before the latter empties into the Rhine. It rises on the territory of Walscheid as the Yellow Zorn (German: Gelber Zorn, French: Zorn Jaune) and becomes the Zorn after its confluence with the right-hand tributary, the White Zorn (Ge: Weißer Zorn, Fr.: Zorn Blanche). It has a length of just under 97 kilometres and drains an area of 757 km². The French spelling Zorn first surfaced in the 18th century. Hitherto the river was called the Sorn, which stems from the pre-Celtic era and probably meant "the flowing one". The upper reaches of the river, as far as Saverne, are home to many fine examples of architecture.

== Tributaries ==
- White Zorn (right), 8.5 km
- Treubach (left)
- Mittbach (left)
- Ruisseau de Dabo (right)
- Fischbach (right)
- Ruisseau de Heyerst (left), 3.7 km
- Tiergartenbach (right), 3.7 km
- Hesselgraben (left)
- Stutzbach (left), 4.7 km
- Ruisseau le Mundel (right), 1.6 km
- Baerenbach (right), 11.3 km
- Ruisseau de la Fontaine Mélanie (left), 4.5 km
- Schlettenbach (left)
- Michelsbaechel (left), 5.1 km
- Liesgraben (left)
- Liesmattgraben (left), 3.4 km
- Southern Zinsel (rivière la zinsel du sud) (left), 30.9 km
- Mossel (rivière la mossel) (right), 21.2 km
- Horattgraben (right)
- Lienbach (left), 9.5 km
- Littenheimerbach (Morenthalgraben) (right), 3.1 km
- Rohrbach (right)
- Embsbaechel (Bachgraben) (left), 12.7 km
- Gebolsheimerbach (left) (via the Landgraben 11.2 km)
- Mattgraben (right), 1.2 km
- Rissbach (left), 8.0 km
- Seltenbach (left) (via the Hochstettergraben 9.6 km)
