= Wingen-sur-Moder =

- Commune
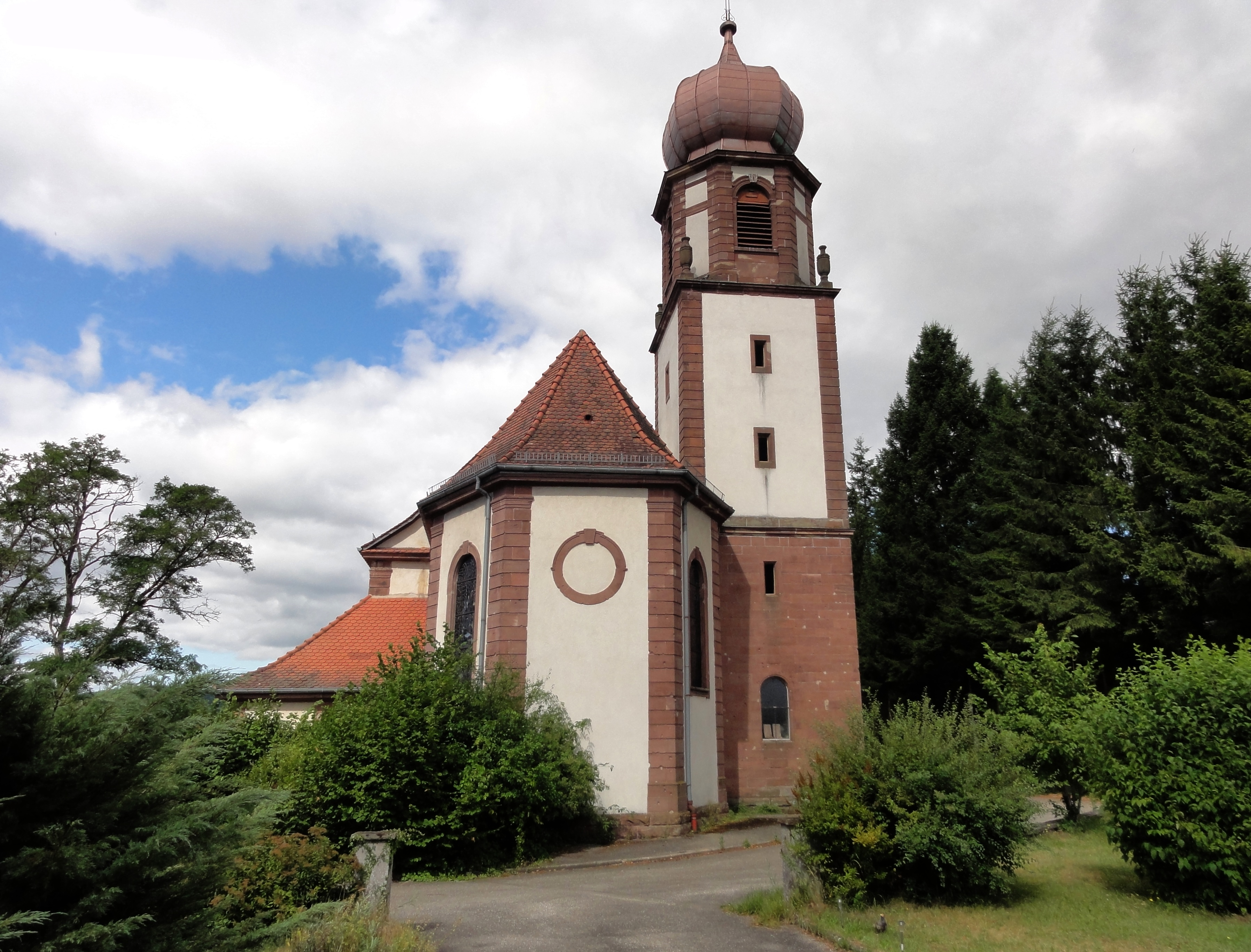
- The church in Wingen-sur-Moder

- Coat of arms
- Location of Wingen-sur-Moder
- Location within France Location within Grand Est
- Coordinates: 48°55′16″N 7°22′37″E
- Country: France
- Region: Grand Est
- Department: Bas-Rhin
- Arrondissement: Saverne
- Canton: Ingwiller
- Intercommunality: Hanau-La Petite Pierre

Government
  - Mayor (2020–2026): Christian Dorschner
- Area^{1}: 17.37 km^{2} (6.71 sq mi)
- Highest elevation: 406 m (1,332 ft)
- Lowest elevation: 207 m (679 ft)
- Population (2023): 1,530
  - Density: 88.1/km^{2} (228/sq mi)
- Time zone: UTC+01:00 (CET)
  - Summer (DST): UTC+02:00 (CEST)
- INSEE/Postal code: 67538 /67290
- ^{1} French Land Register data, which excludes lakes, ponds, glaciers > 1 km^{2} (0.386 sq mi or 247 acres) and river estuaries.

Wingen-sur-Moder (French pronunciation: [viŋ(g)ən syʁ mɔdɛʁ]; German: Wingen an der Moder; Rhine Franconian: Winge) is a commune in the Bas-Rhin department in Grand Est in north-eastern France. The name, literally translated as "Wingen on the Moder", is often shortened to Wingen, although this is the name of a small commune in the Haguenau-Wissembourg arrondissement.

== History ==
The location of Wingen-sur-Moder was the site of a village of the Triboci tribe. Part of the borders of the village are marked by menhirs, including three named menhirs which still exist: Spitzstein, Drei-Peterstein, and Breitenstein. The first known mention of Wingen is in 718, when Wingibergus is mentioned in documents donated to Weissenburg Abbey. The village is also mentioned in 742 as Wigone Monte and in the twelfth century as Winchenhoven.

The fourteenth century saw many conflicts affect the town. In 1314, soldiers of the Imperial City of Strasbourg burned Wingen and several nearby towns during their march towards La Petite-Pierre, a nearby village that was home to one of the lords aligned against Strasbourg. In 1382, the Count of Linange made Wingen a fiefdom and granted it to the Holy Roman Emperor. The town lies along an important travel route between the Moder and Eichel valleys during this period and the emperor began to toll travel through the town. The Thirty Years War and an outbreak of plague devastated Wingen and the surrounding region in the early seventeenth century, leaving the town uninhabited. In the wake of the war, the town was repopulated primarily by Swiss immigrants.

The eighteenth century brought the introduction of Wingen's most important industry: glassmaking. Master glassblowers from neighboring Rosteig built shops in the hamlets of Neuhütte in 1708 and Hochberg in 1715. However, it was not until 1922 that the largest and most famous glassmaker arrived in Wingen. In that year, famous French glass designer René Lalique opened the Verrerie d'Alsace (Alsace glassworks) glassworks in Wingen; it became the Cristallerie Lalique (Lalique Crystal Works) in 1962. It is the only glass production facility of the Lalique company, which he founded.

=== Battle of Wingen-sur-Moder ===
In early January 1945, Wingen was the location of a minor, but strategically important battle between German and American forces. On New Year's Eve, Germany launched a surprise offensive—Operation Nordwind—in northern Alsace. At the start of the offensive, Wingen was controlled by Allied forces and a modest number of soldiers from the Seventh United States Army were positioned near the town. At dawn on 4 January, two battalions of the German 6th SS Mountain Division Nord managed to quickly capture Wingen. Over 200 American soldiers positioned in the town were caught off guard, captured, and held captive in the Catholic church and a nearby house without food or water until they were liberated on 7 January. The two sides fought house-to-house for the ensuing three days until the Germans retreated in the early hours of 7 January. The fighting damaged nearly every building in Wingen.

=== Heritage sites ===
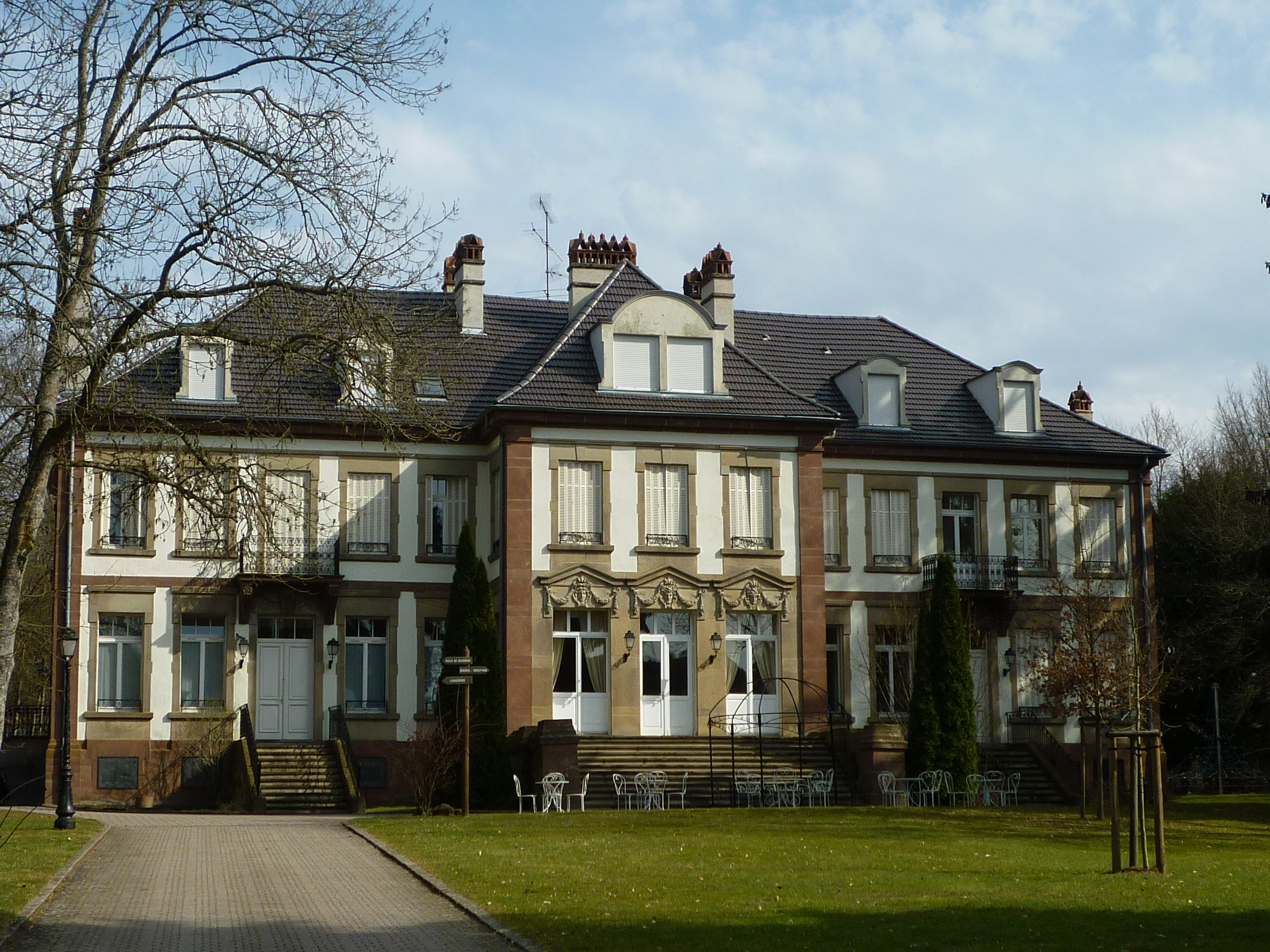
The Teutsch house

Two national heritage sites (monuments historiques or MH) are located in Wingen-sur-Moder.

The Teutsch house (French: Château Teutsch) was constructed by the Teutsch family between 1860 and 1866. Starting in 1816, the Teutsch family owned and operated the Hochberg glass factory, which was in decline at the time the house was built and closed in 1868. The house was restored in 1990 and its exterior facade and roof have been registered as a monument historique since 1996. The interior has been completely redesigned and now serves as a summer camp.

The former Hochberg glassworks (French: Verrerie du Hochberg; also known as Hanauer-Glashütte) was founded in 1715 by Jean-Adam Stenger. The site was registered as a monument historique in 1996 and consists of workshops, two large residences, and worker housing. The glassworks also include the Teutsch House, which is registered as a separate historic monument.

The Lalique Museum, opened in 2011, is located on the site of the former Hochberg glassworks.

== Geography ==
The town of Wingen-sur-Moder lies in the upper valley of the Moder at an elevation of 220 metres (720 ft). The commune covers 1,738 hectares (4,290 acres), of which more than 80% is covered by forest. It is one of many communes that are located within the Northern Vosges Regional Nature Park.

The commune includes the hamlets Huhnerscherr, Kohlhutte, and Stauffersberg.

== Population ==
Historical population
Year	Pop.	±% p.a.
1968	1,458	—
1975	1,539	+0.78%
1982	1,550	+0.10%
1990	1,551	+0.01%
1999	1,484	−0.49%
2007	1,609	+1.02%
2012	1,562	−0.59%
2017	1,626	+0.81%
2023	1,530	−1.01%
Source: INSEE

== Transport ==
Wingen-sur-Moder has a railway station, which is located along the Mommenheim-Sarreguemines railway line, which connects the cities of Strasbourg, France and Saarbrücken, Germany. The rail line was built during German rule by the General Division of the Imperial Railways in Alsace-Lorraine; the section through Wingen-sur-Moder opened 1 May 1895. TER Grand Est, a Train Express Régional operated by SNCF, serves the Wingen-sur-Moder station.

The town lies along Route D919, which runs from Haguenau to Sarreguemines and connects Wingen to other communities along the Moder Valley. Route D256 runs north from the town through the northern part of the commune to the Moselle border, where it continues north as D37 to Bitche. Route D135 travels south from the town to La Petite-Pierre.

== Twin city ==
The town is a twin town to Burgkirchen an der Alz, in southeastern Germany.

== See also ==
- Communes of the Bas-Rhin department
- Musée Lalique
