= Uberach =

- Part of Val-de-Moder
- Coat of arms
- Location of Uberach
- Location within France Location within Grand Est
- Coordinates: 48°51′01″N 7°37′46″E
- Country: France
- Region: Grand Est
- Department: Bas-Rhin
- Arrondissement: Haguenau-Wissembourg
- Canton: Reichshoffen
- Commune: Val-de-Moder
- Area^{1}: 2.01 km^{2} (0.78 sq mi)
- Highest elevation: 207 m (679 ft)
- Lowest elevation: 157 m (515 ft)
- Population (2022): 1,201
  - Density: 598/km^{2} (1,550/sq mi)
- Time zone: UTC+01:00 (CET)
  - Summer (DST): UTC+02:00 (CEST)
- Postal code: 67350
- ^{1} French Land Register data, which excludes lakes, ponds, glaciers > 1 km^{2} (0.386 sq mi or 247 acres) and river estuaries.

Uberach (French pronunciation: [ybəʁax]; German: Überach; Alsatian: Ìwerach) is a former commune in the Bas-Rhin department in Grand Est in north-eastern France. On 1 January 2016, it was merged into the new commune Val-de-Moder.

== Economy ==
The microbrewery Brasserie Uberach.

== Demographics ==
Historical population

Year	Pop.	±% p.a.
1793	508	—
1800	504	−0.11%
1806	622	+3.57%
1821	778	+1.50%
1831	771	−0.09%
1836	702	−1.86%
1841	668	−0.99%
1846	680	+0.36%
1851	687	+0.21%
1856	698	+0.32%
1861	702	+0.11%
1866	739	+1.03%
1871	716	−0.63%
1875	709	−0.25%
1880	740	+0.86%
1885	696	−1.22%
1890	702	+0.17%

Year	Pop.	±% p.a.
1895	694	−0.23%
1900	666	−0.82%
1905	724	+1.68%
1910	783	+1.58%
1921	788	+0.06%
1926	843	+1.36%
1931	845	+0.05%
1936	883	+0.88%
1946	881	−0.02%
1954	936	+0.76%
1962	1,028	+1.18%
1968	1,071	+0.69%
1975	1,127	+0.73%
1982	1,125	−0.03%
1990	1,089	−0.41%
1999	1,091	+0.02%
2022	1,201	+0.42%

Source: EHESS and INSEE

== See also ==
- Communes of the Bas-Rhin department
