= Onville =

- Commune
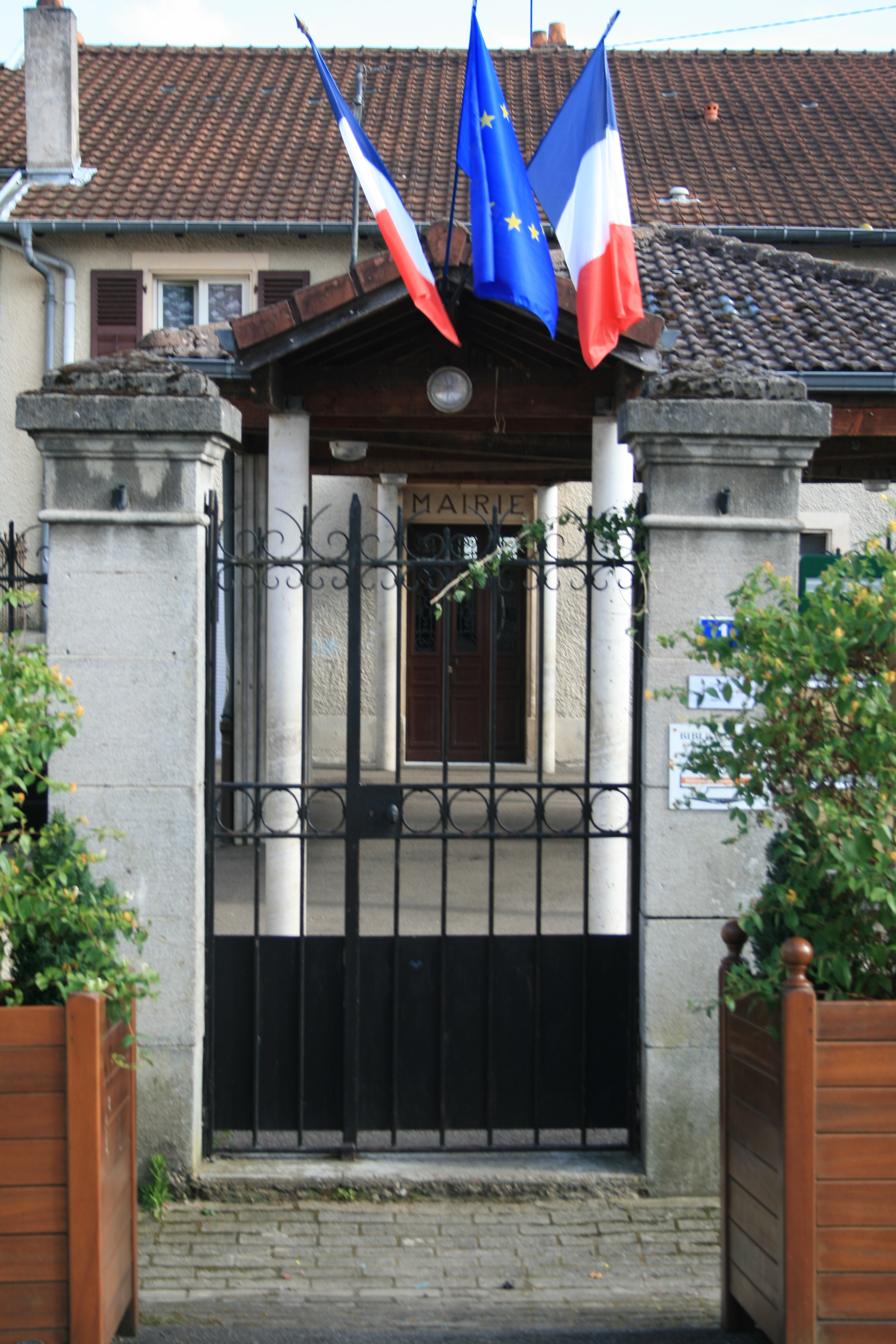
- The town hall in Onville

- Coat of arms
- Location of Onville
- Location within France Location within Grand Est
- Coordinates: 49°01′03″N 5°58′15″E
- Country: France
- Region: Grand Est
- Department: Meurthe-et-Moselle
- Arrondissement: Toul
- Canton: Pont-à-Mousson
- Intercommunality: Mad et Moselle

Government
  - Mayor (2020–2026): Thierry Tessier
- Area^{1}: 9.27 km^{2} (3.58 sq mi)
- Elevation: 196 m (643 ft)
- Highest elevation: 365 m (1,198 ft)
- Lowest elevation: 182 m (597 ft)
- Population (2023): 501
  - Density: 54.0/km^{2} (140/sq mi)
- Time zone: UTC+01:00 (CET)
  - Summer (DST): UTC+02:00 (CEST)
- INSEE/Postal code: 54410 /54890
- ^{1} French Land Register data, which excludes lakes, ponds, glaciers > 1 km^{2} (0.386 sq mi or 247 acres) and river estuaries.

Onville (French pronunciation: [ɔ̃vil]) is a commune in the Meurthe-et-Moselle department in north-eastern France.

== Geography ==
The village lies on the left bank of the Rupt de Mad, which flows eastward through the middle of the commune.

== See also ==
- Communes of the Meurthe-et-Moselle department
- Parc naturel régional de Lorraine
