= Blainville-sur-l'Eau =

- Commune
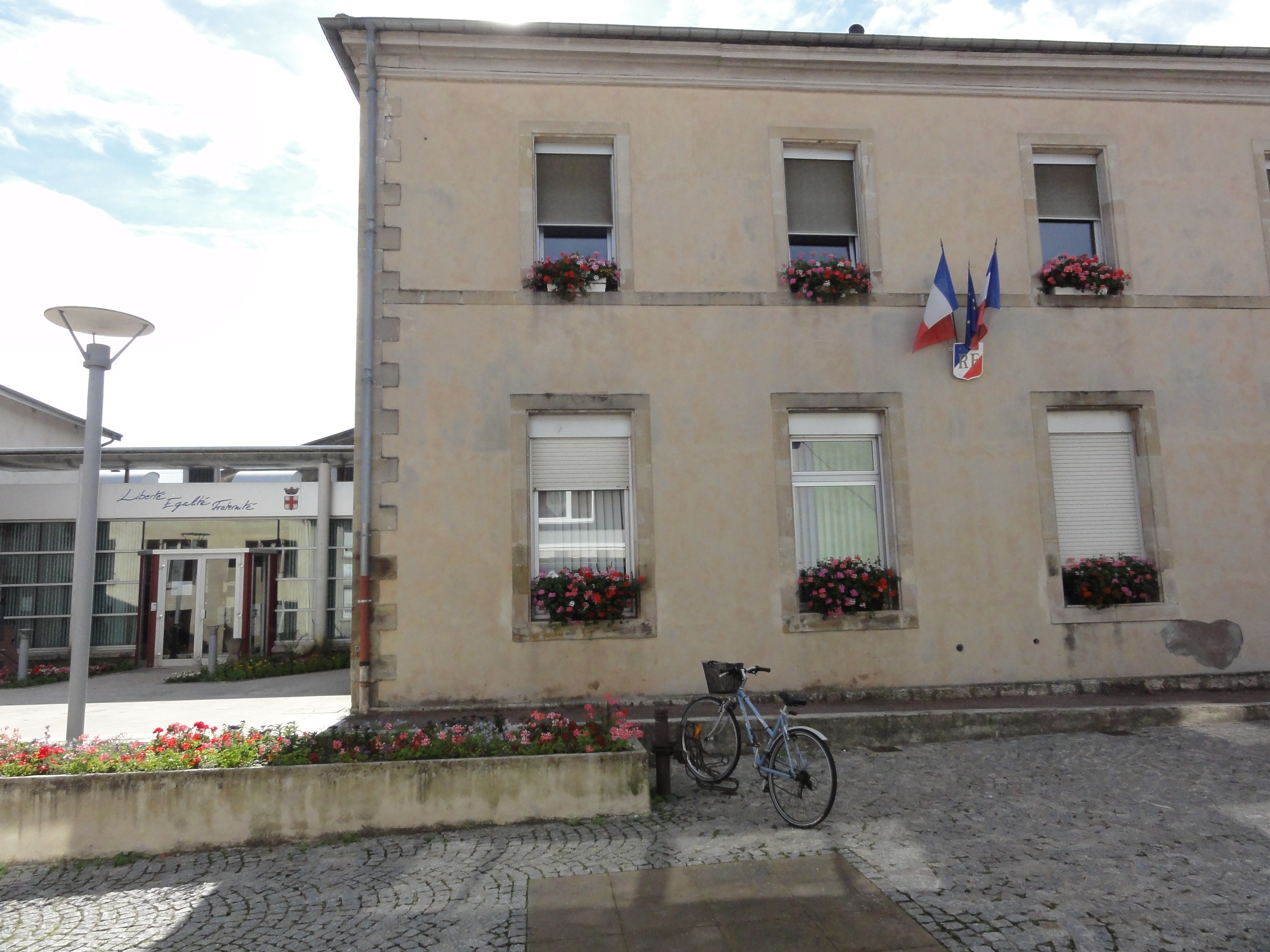
- The town hall in Blainville-sur-l'Eau

- Coat of arms
- Location of Blainville-sur-l'Eau
- Location within France Location within Grand Est
- Coordinates: 48°33′22″N 6°24′27″E
- Country: France
- Region: Grand Est
- Department: Meurthe-et-Moselle
- Arrondissement: Lunéville
- Canton: Lunéville-2
- Intercommunality: Meurthe, Mortagne, Moselle

Government
  - Mayor (2020–2026): Olivier Martet
- Area^{1}: 11.74 km^{2} (4.53 sq mi)
- Elevation: 250 m (820 ft)
- Highest elevation: 288 m (945 ft)
- Lowest elevation: 212 m (696 ft)
- Population (2023): 3,893
  - Density: 331.6/km^{2} (858.8/sq mi)
- Time zone: UTC+01:00 (CET)
  - Summer (DST): UTC+02:00 (CEST)
- INSEE/Postal code: 54076 /54360
- ^{1} French Land Register data, which excludes lakes, ponds, glaciers > 1 km^{2} (0.386 sq mi or 247 acres) and river estuaries.

Blainville-sur-l'Eau (French pronunciation: [blɛ̃vil syʁ lo], literally Blainville on the Water) is a commune in the Meurthe-et-Moselle department in northeastern France.

== Population ==
Historical population
Year	Pop.	±% p.a.
1968	4,836	—
1975	4,484	−1.07%
1982	3,895	−1.99%
1990	3,654	−0.80%
1999	3,790	+0.41%
2007	4,070	+0.89%
2012	4,012	−0.29%
2017	4,035	+0.11%
2023	3,893	−0.60%
Source: INSEE

== See also ==
- Communes of the Meurthe-et-Moselle department
