= Réding =

- Commune
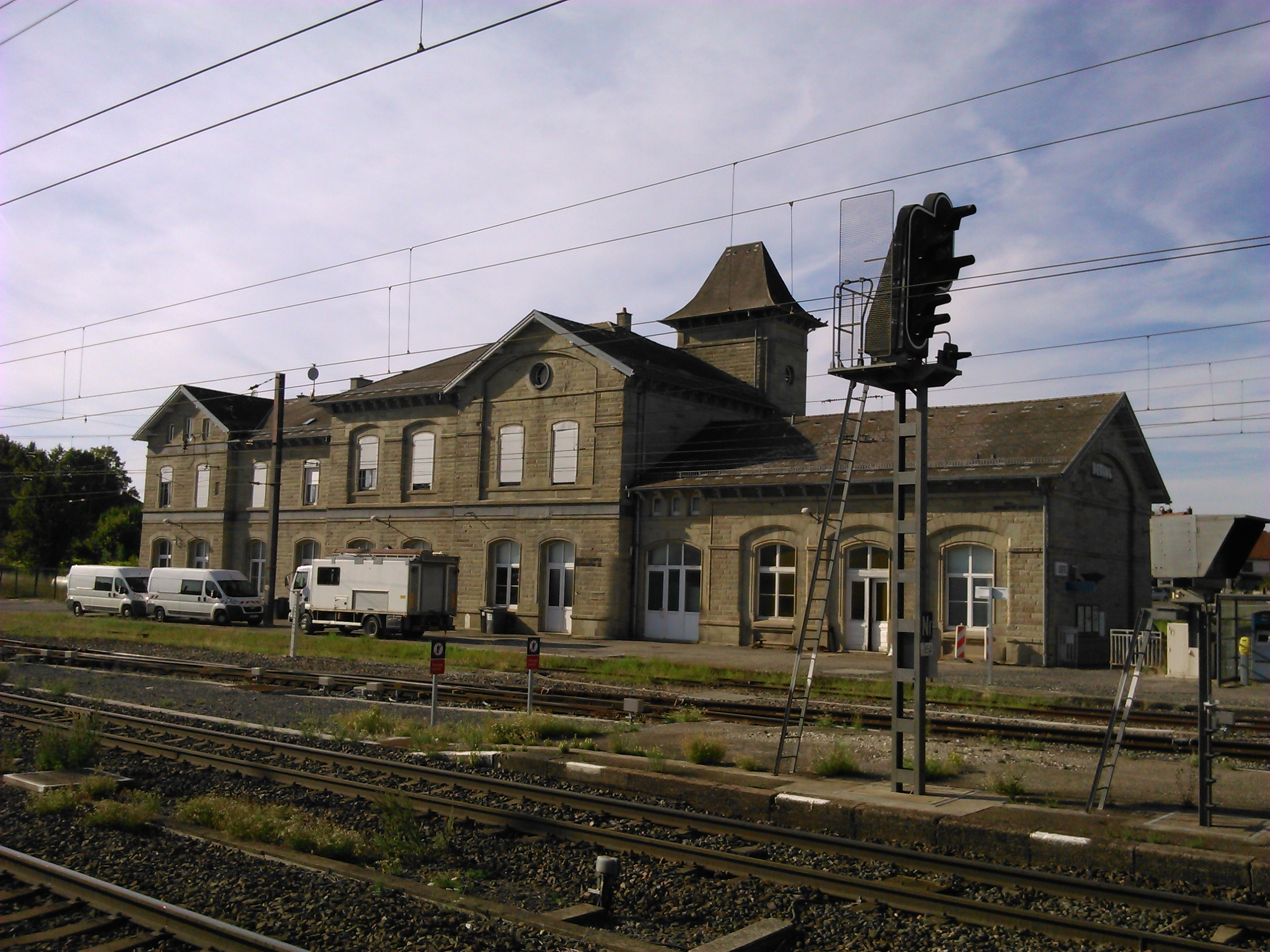
- Réding railway station

- Coat of arms
- Location of Réding
- Location within France Location within Grand Est
- Coordinates: 48°45′07″N 7°06′28″E
- Country: France
- Region: Grand Est
- Department: Moselle
- Arrondissement: Sarrebourg-Château-Salins
- Canton: Sarrebourg
- Intercommunality: CC Sarrebourg Moselle Sud

Government
  - Mayor (2020–2026): Denis Loutre
- Area^{1}: 11.61 km^{2} (4.48 sq mi)
- Elevation: 262 m (860 ft)
- Highest elevation: 315 m (1,033 ft)
- Lowest elevation: 245 m (804 ft)
- Population (2023): 2,280
  - Density: 196/km^{2} (509/sq mi)
- Time zone: UTC+01:00 (CET)
  - Summer (DST): UTC+02:00 (CEST)
- INSEE/Postal code: 57566 /57445
- ^{1} French Land Register data, which excludes lakes, ponds, glaciers > 1 km^{2} (0.386 sq mi or 247 acres) and river estuaries.

Réding (French pronunciation: [ʁedɛ̃]; German: Rieding) is a commune in the Moselle department in Grand Est in north-eastern France.

== Geography ==
Réding is located in the south of the Moselle department, near Sarrebourg.

The commune is crossed by the RN4 and close to the A4 highway.

The Réding station is an important junction station. Located on the line from Paris to Strasbourg, it is the starting point of the line from Réding to Metz-Ville and the line from Réding to Diemeringen which connects the LGV Est to the classic train lines.

Réding is served by the bus line n° 1 of the iSibus network.

=== Hydrography ===
The municipality is located in the Rhine watershed within the Rhine-Meuse basin. It is drained by the Bièvre, the Eichmatte stream, the Otterbach stream, the Bubenbach stream and the Steiglenbach.

The quality of the water of the commune river system, in particular the Bievre, can be consulted on a dedicated site managed by the agences de l'eau and the Office Français de la Biodiversité.

== History ==
The first appearance of the name Réding (Rodinga) dates from 789, in the description of the Wissembourg abbey.

On 16 June 1035 the chapel of Grand Eich was consecrated to St. Ulrich.

In 1361, there is mention in the archpriesthood of Sarrebourg of a main town called Réding and an annex called Eich.

Réding suffered the full force of the Thirty Years' War. In 1631, of the 76 families existing at that time, there will remain only 15 inhabitants.

In 1661, with the treaty of Vincennes between the duke of Lorraine and Louis XIV, Sarrebourg and Phalsbourg (with Réding) are taken away from Lorraine to be attached to the Three Bishoprics (Metz, Toul and Verdun). It is then at this time that the commune became French.

Between 1795 and 1800, Réding absorbed the communes of Eich and Petit Eich.

In accordance with the Treaty of Frankfurt of 1871, Réding was annexed to the German Empire like Alsace-Lorraine as a whole.

The town became French again, after the end of the First World War.

== Population ==
Historical population
Year	Pop.	±% p.a.
1968	1,704	—
1975	1,907	+1.62%
1982	2,283	+2.60%
1990	2,336	+0.29%
1999	2,337	+0.00%
2007	2,464	+0.66%
2012	2,437	−0.22%
2017	2,384	−0.44%
2023	2,280	−0.74%
Source: INSEE

== Sport ==
Réding has several sport clubs.

The town's football club is the A.S. Réding. It was founded in 1936. It has several teams of different levels, including the fanion team which plays at the Régional 3 level.

The tennis club of Réding, which was founded in 1977, was created by Jean Bourst.

The petanque club of the town was founded in 2002, on the initiative of Guy Pronnier. It is currently chaired by Jean-Paul Frank. From time to time, the association organises competitions and sporting events.

Réding also has a remote-controlled buggy club. It was founded by Jean-Marie Deschaseaux. The Auto Buggy Club de Réding hosts a number of competitions, even some international ones, such as the world remote-controlled motorbike championship in 2024.

== Cultural events and festivities ==
The traditional kirb festival has been celebrated in the municipality in October for many decades.

In 2016, this celebration was expanded with the addition of the "Reding en fête" event. Events of the Breast Cancer Awareness Month are sometimes associated with it.

== See also ==
- Communes of the Moselle department
