= Zittersheim =

- Commune
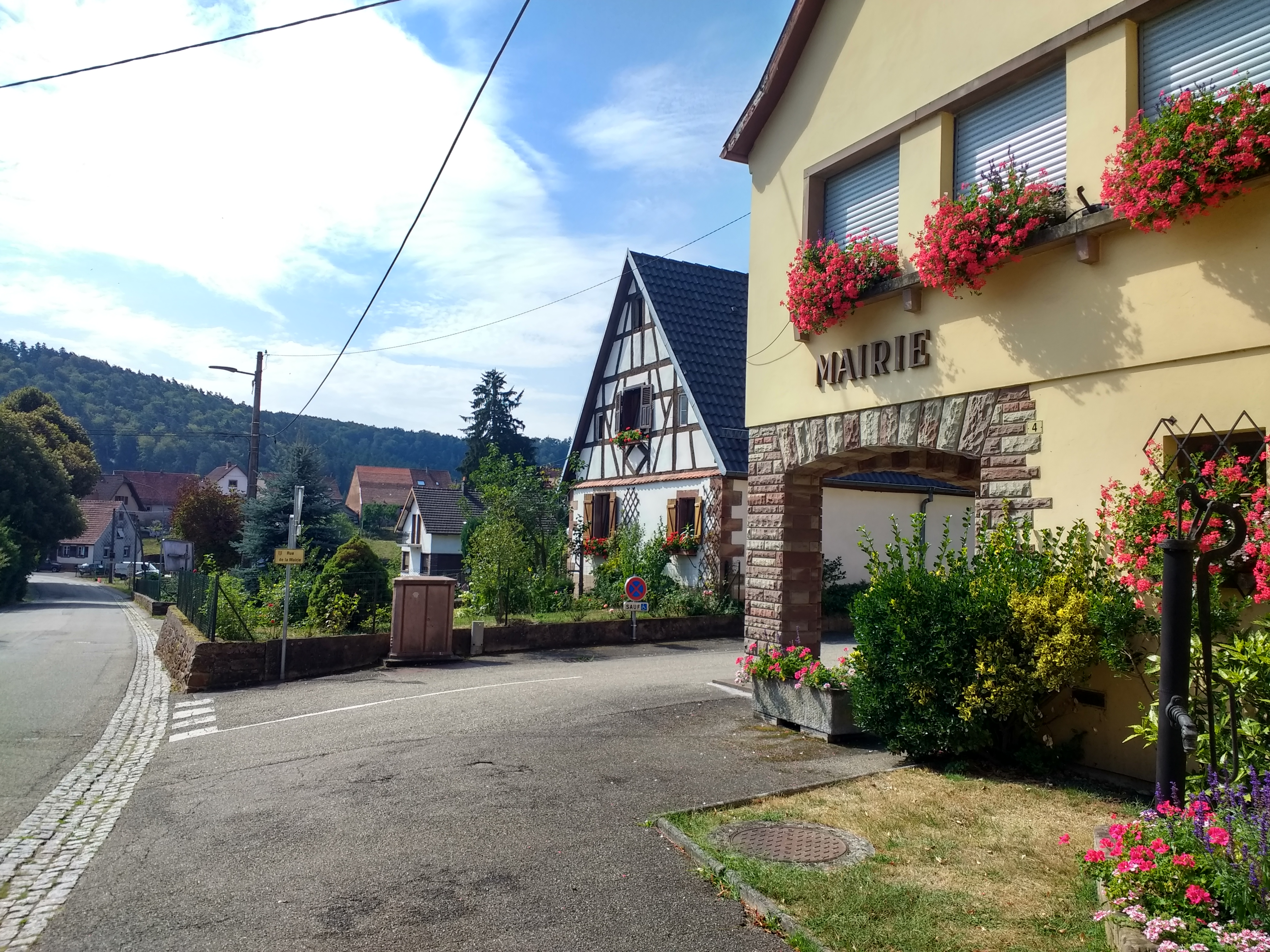
- The town hall and surroundings in Zittersheim

- Coat of arms
- Location of Zittersheim
- Location within France Location within Grand Est
- Coordinates: 48°54′01″N 7°20′55″E
- Country: France
- Region: Grand Est
- Department: Bas-Rhin
- Arrondissement: Saverne
- Canton: Ingwiller
- Intercommunality: Hanau-La Petite Pierre

Government
  - Mayor (2020–2026): Jean-Marc Reichhart
- Area^{1}: 7.92 km^{2} (3.06 sq mi)
- Elevation: 260 m (850 ft)
- Highest elevation: 390 m (1,280 ft)
- Lowest elevation: 220 m (720 ft)
- Population (2023): 232
  - Density: 29.3/km^{2} (75.9/sq mi)
- Demonym(s): Zittersheimois, Zittersheimoises
- Time zone: UTC+01:00 (CET)
  - Summer (DST): UTC+02:00 (CEST)
- INSEE/Postal code: 67559 /67290
- ^{1} French Land Register data, which excludes lakes, ponds, glaciers > 1 km^{2} (0.386 sq mi or 247 acres) and river estuaries.

Zittersheim (Rhine Franconian: Zíttersche) is a commune in the Bas-Rhin department in Grand Est in north-eastern France.

== Population ==
Historical population

Year	Pop.	±% p.a.
1800	278	—
1821	365	+1.30%
1846	420	+0.56%
1871	435	+0.14%
1900	412	−0.19%
1926	323	−0.93%
1946	288	−0.57%
1962	256	−0.73%
1968	231	−1.70%

Year	Pop.	±% p.a.
1975	228	−0.19%
1982	216	−0.77%
1990	217	+0.06%
1999	205	−0.63%
2007	255	+2.77%
2012	237	−1.45%
2017	250	+1.07%
2023	232	−1.24%

Source: EHESS and INSEE

== See also ==
- Communes of the Bas-Rhin department
