= Puberg =

- Commune
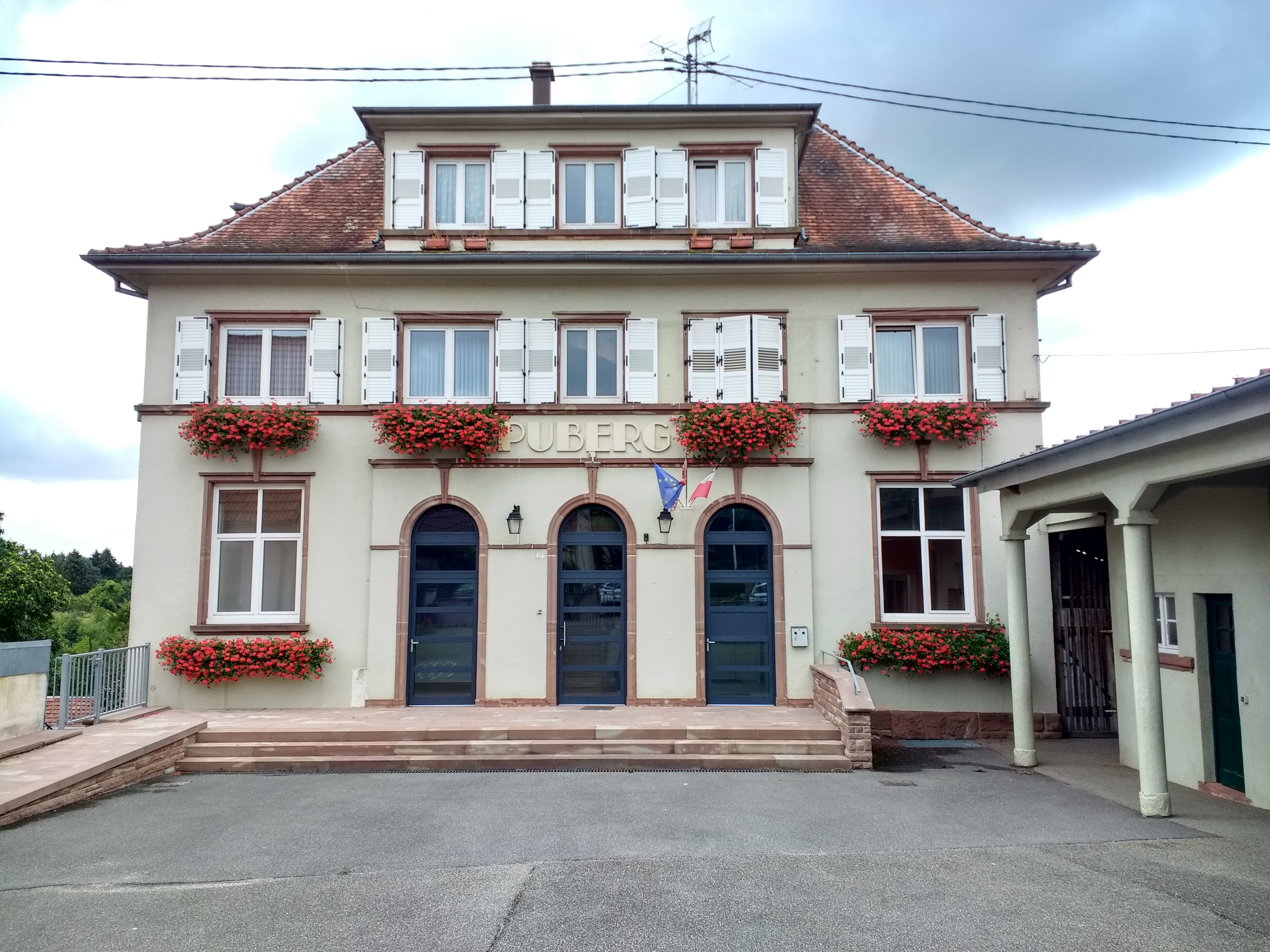
- The town hall in Puberg

- Coat of arms
- Location of Puberg
- Location within France Location within Grand Est
- Coordinates: 48°54′44″N 7°18′57″E
- Country: France
- Region: Grand Est
- Department: Bas-Rhin
- Arrondissement: Saverne
- Canton: Ingwiller

Government
  - Mayor (2020–2026): Francisco De Figueiredo
- Area^{1}: 4.91 km^{2} (1.90 sq mi)
- Highest elevation: 396 m (1,299 ft)
- Lowest elevation: 247 m (810 ft)
- Population (2023): 319
  - Density: 65.0/km^{2} (168/sq mi)
- Time zone: UTC+01:00 (CET)
  - Summer (DST): UTC+02:00 (CEST)
- INSEE/Postal code: 67381 /67290
- ^{1} French Land Register data, which excludes lakes, ponds, glaciers > 1 km^{2} (0.386 sq mi or 247 acres) and river estuaries.

Puberg is a commune in the Bas-Rhin department in Grand Est in north-eastern France.

== See also ==
- Communes of the Bas-Rhin department
