= La Walck =

- Part of Val-de-Moder
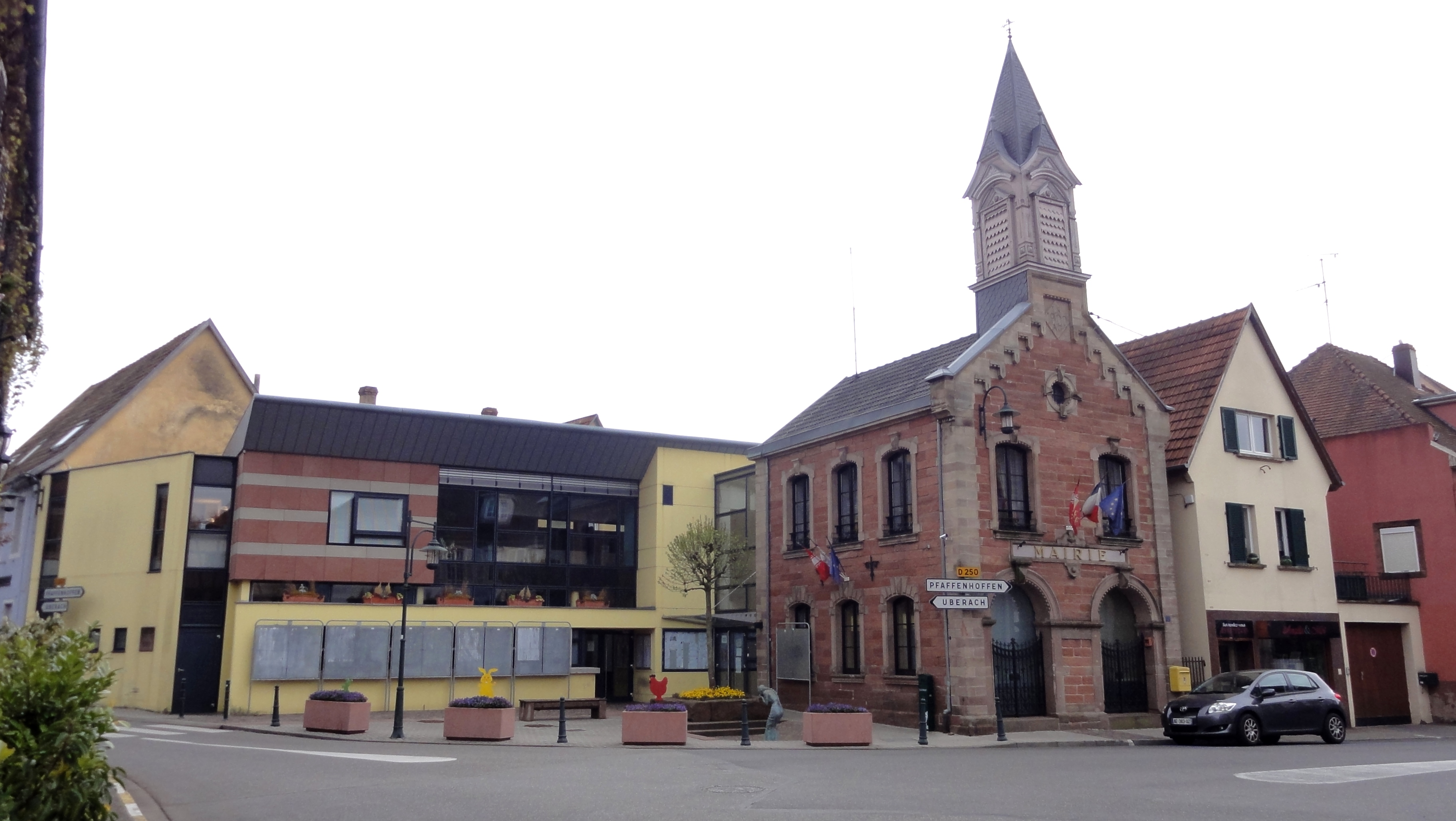
- Town hall

- Coat of arms
- Location of La Walck
- Location within France Location within Grand Est
- Coordinates: 48°51′02″N 7°36′42″E
- Country: France
- Region: Grand Est
- Department: Bas-Rhin
- Arrondissement: Haguenau-Wissembourg
- Canton: Reichshoffen
- Commune: Val-de-Moder
- Area^{1}: 0.6 km^{2} (0.23 sq mi)
- Elevation: 170 m (560 ft)
- Highest elevation: 208 m (682 ft)
- Lowest elevation: 163 m (535 ft)
- Population (2022): 1,038
  - Density: 1,700/km^{2} (4,500/sq mi)
- Time zone: UTC+01:00 (CET)
  - Summer (DST): UTC+02:00 (CEST)
- Postal code: 67350
- ^{1} French Land Register data, which excludes lakes, ponds, glaciers > 1 km^{2} (0.386 sq mi or 247 acres) and river estuaries.

La Walck (French pronunciation: [la valk]; German: Walk; Alsatian: D Wàlik) is a former commune in the Bas-Rhin department in north-eastern France. On 1 January 2016, it was merged into the new commune Val-de-Moder.

== See also ==
- Communes of the Bas-Rhin department
