= Obermodern-Zutzendorf =

- Commune
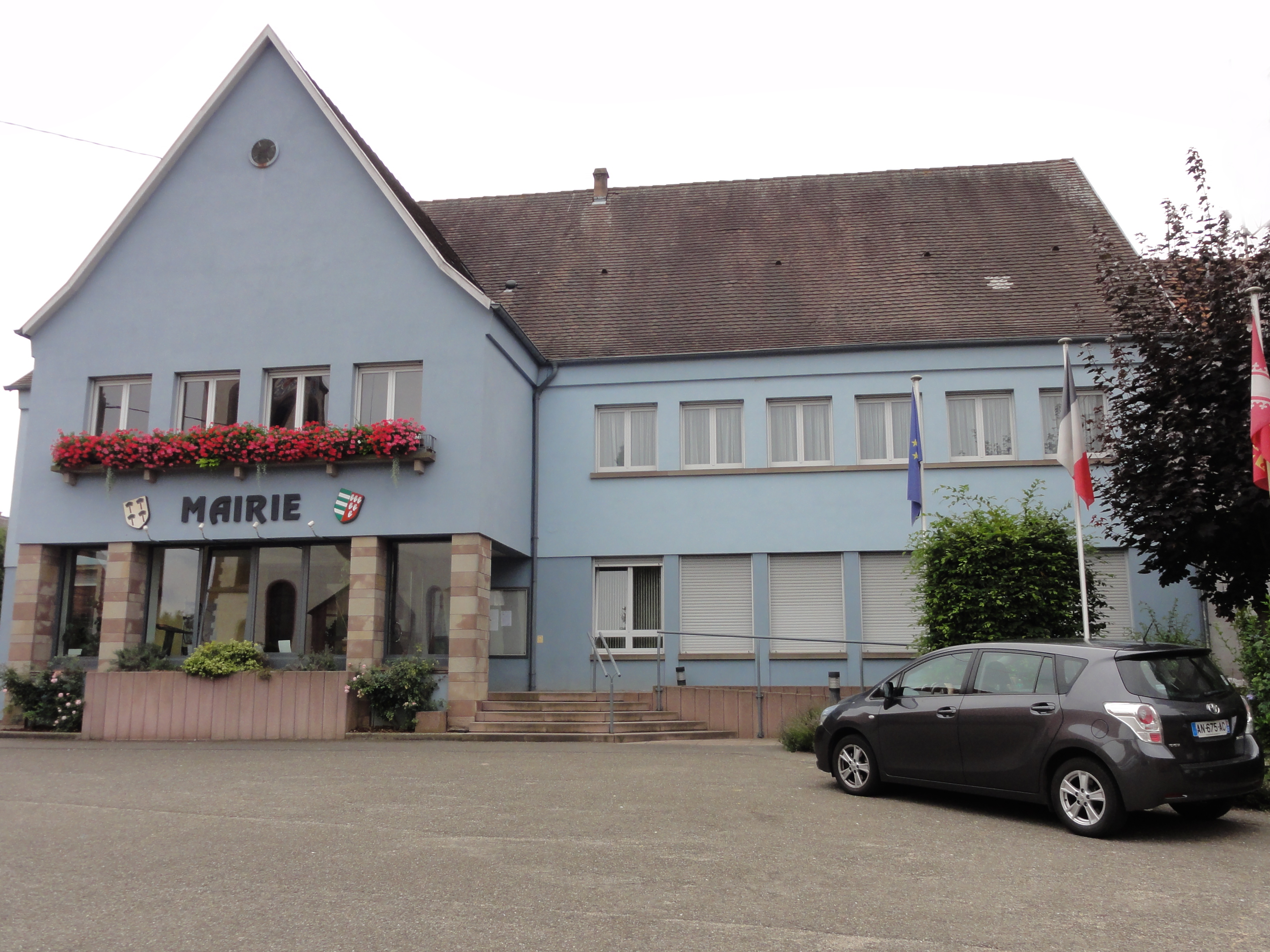
- The town hall in Obermodern

- Coat of arms
- Location of Obermodern-Zutzendorf
- Location within France Location within Grand Est
- Coordinates: 48°50′43″N 7°32′28″E
- Country: France
- Region: Grand Est
- Department: Bas-Rhin
- Arrondissement: Saverne
- Canton: Bouxwiller
- Intercommunality: Hanau-La Petite Pierre

Government
  - Mayor (2020–2026): Helmut Stegner
- Area^{1}: 14.46 km^{2} (5.58 sq mi)
- Highest elevation: 253 m (830 ft)
- Lowest elevation: 169 m (554 ft)
- Population (2023): 1,774
  - Density: 122.7/km^{2} (317.7/sq mi)
- Time zone: UTC+01:00 (CET)
  - Summer (DST): UTC+02:00 (CEST)
- INSEE/Postal code: 67347 /67330
- ^{1} French Land Register data, which excludes lakes, ponds, glaciers > 1 km^{2} (0.386 sq mi or 247 acres) and river estuaries.

Obermodern-Zutzendorf is a commune in the Bas-Rhin department in Grand Est in north-eastern France.

== Population ==
Historical population
Year	Pop.	±% p.a.
1968	1,459	—
1975	1,464	+0.05%
1982	1,481	+0.17%
1990	1,395	−0.75%
1999	1,436	+0.32%
2007	1,559	+1.03%
2012	1,703	+1.78%
2017	1,681	−0.26%
2023	1,774	+0.90%
Source: INSEE

== See also ==
- Communes of the Bas-Rhin department
