= Struth =

- Commune
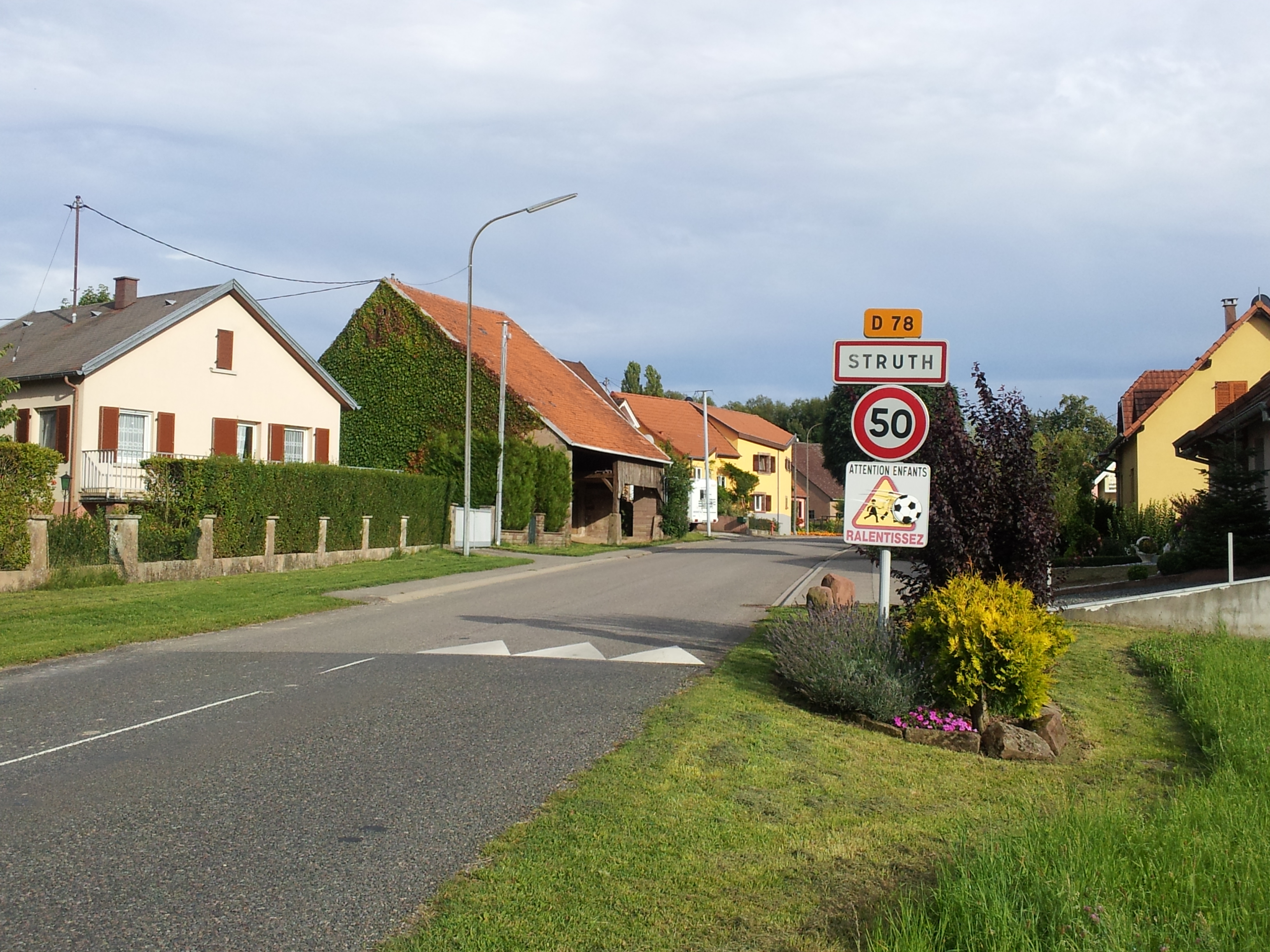
- The road into Struth

- Coat of arms
- Location of Struth
- Location within France Location within Grand Est
- Coordinates: 48°53′41″N 7°15′24″E
- Country: France
- Region: Grand Est
- Department: Bas-Rhin
- Arrondissement: Saverne
- Canton: Ingwiller

Government
  - Mayor (2020–2026): Jean-Claude Berron
- Area^{1}: 4.12 km^{2} (1.59 sq mi)
- Highest elevation: 367 m (1,204 ft)
- Lowest elevation: 248 m (814 ft)
- Population (2023): 213
  - Density: 51.7/km^{2} (134/sq mi)
- Time zone: UTC+01:00 (CET)
  - Summer (DST): UTC+02:00 (CEST)
- INSEE/Postal code: 67483 /67290
- ^{1} French Land Register data, which excludes lakes, ponds, glaciers > 1 km^{2} (0.386 sq mi or 247 acres) and river estuaries.

Struth is a commune in the Bas-Rhin department in Grand Est in north-eastern France.

== See also ==
- Communes of the Bas-Rhin department
