= Kork station =

Railway station in Kehl, Germany

Kork station Bahnhof Kork (Kehl)
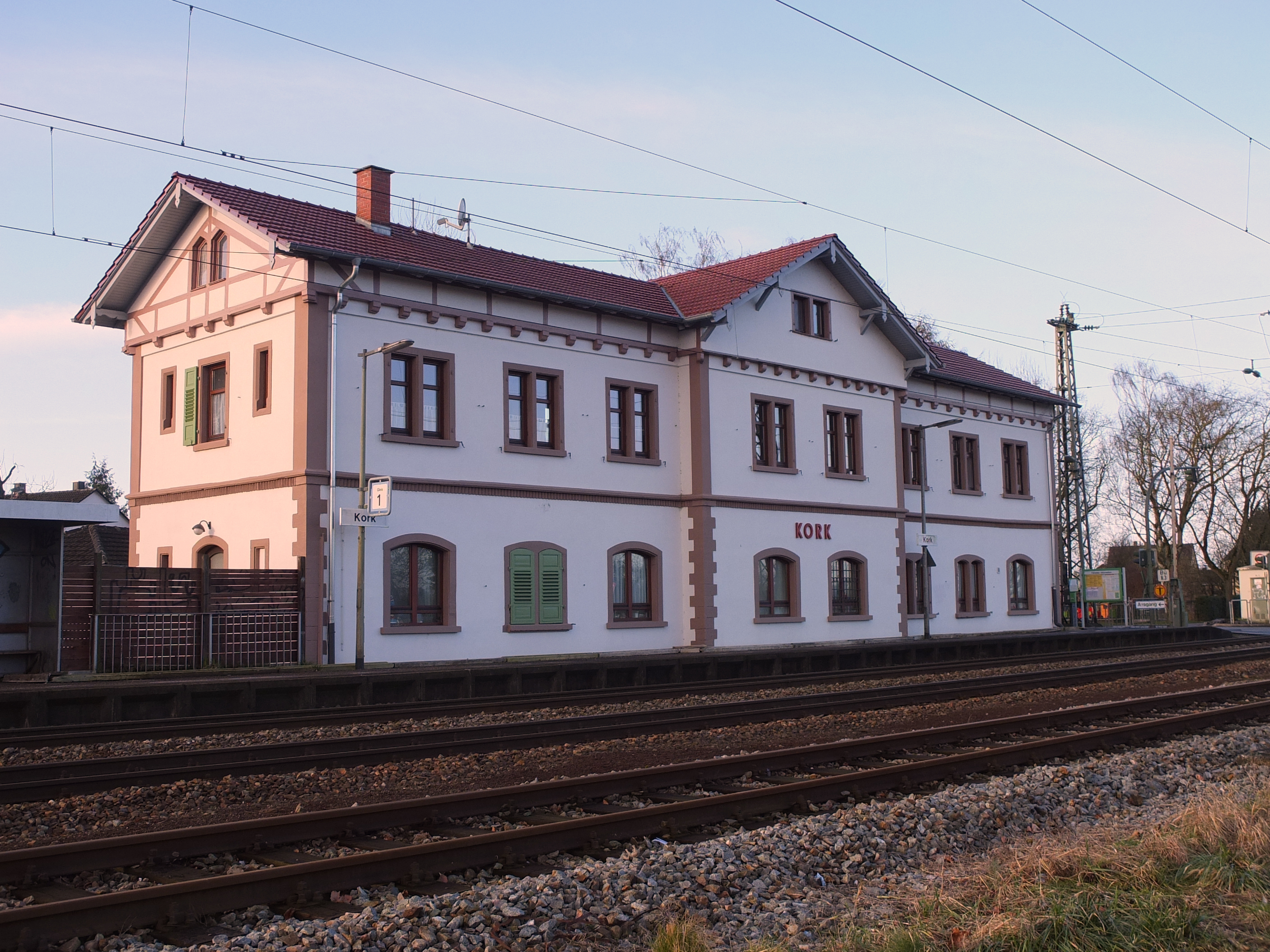

General information
- Location: Kork, Kehl, Baden-Württemberg; Germany
- Coordinates: 48°34′12″N 7°52′29″E
- Line: Appenweier–Strasbourg railway
- Platforms: 2
- Tracks: 2

Other information
- Fare zone: TGO: 2

History
- Opened: 1844
Location

Kork station (German: Bahnhof Kork (Kehl)) is a railway station in Kork, a suburb of Kehl, in southwestern Germany in the Ortenaukreis, Baden-Württemberg. It is on the Appenweier–Strasbourg railway, with trains crossing the Rhine into France to reach the latter destination. Both sides being within the Schengen Area, no passport or border controls apply.

The station opened in 1844. Its two platforms are staggered, rather than being opposite each other, with a level crossing separating them.

TGV services between Paris, Stuttgart and Munich have passed through the station since 2010, albeit at reduced speed. The line also forms part of the Magistrale for Europe initiative, for the creation of a high-speed railway line between Paris and Bratislava, with a branch-off to Budapest.

== Services ==
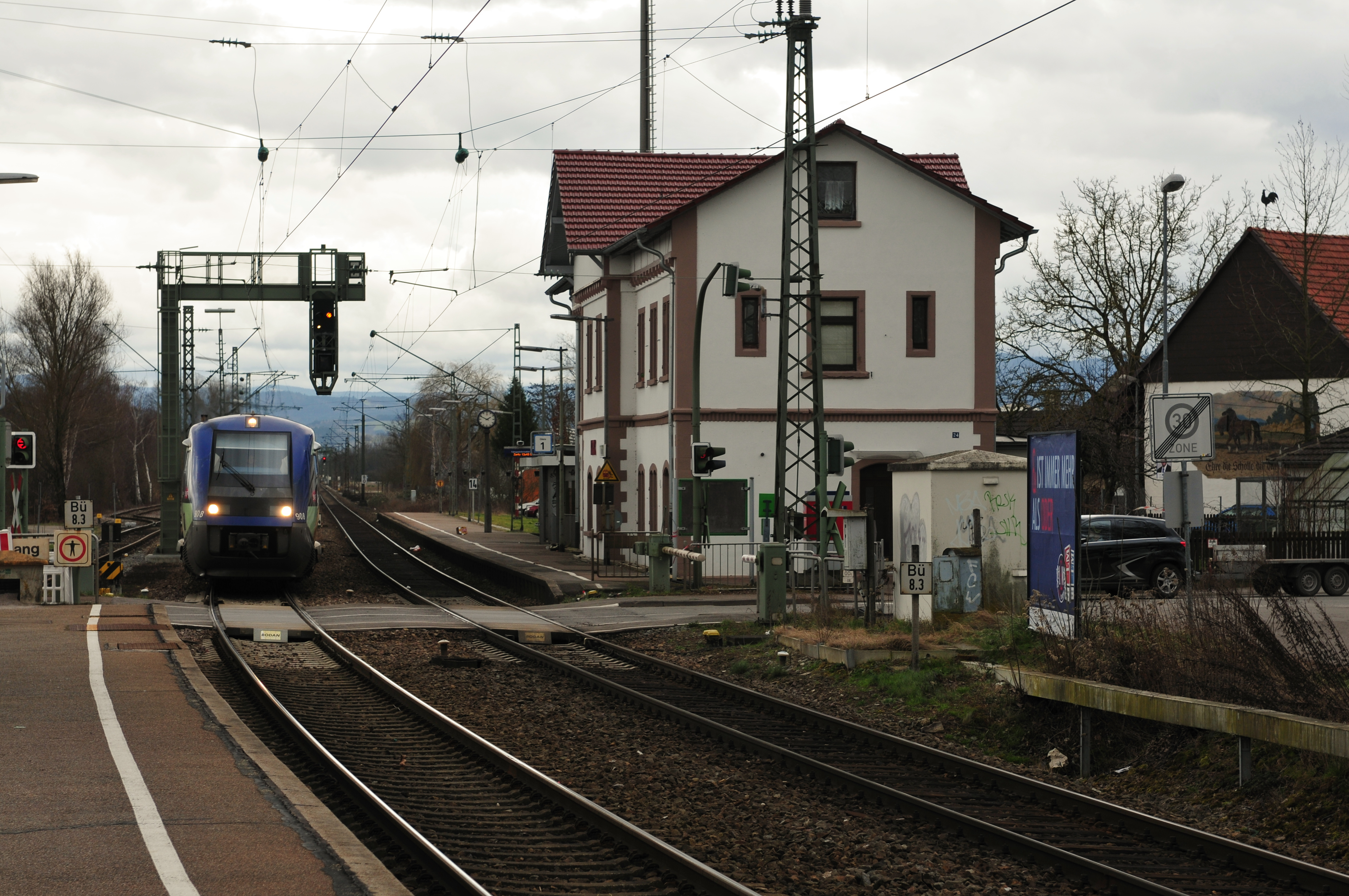
A Strasbourg-bound regional train approaches the station in February 2014, with the 1844 building and the platform for Offenburg-bound trains in the background. The train is an SNCF Class X 73900 unit, in the livery of TER Alsace, a forerunner of the current operator, TER Grand Est.

Kork is served by regional trains.

Preceding station	(Offenburg)	Following station
Kehl towards Strasbourg-Ville	RS 4	Legelshurst towards Offenburg
