= Neudorf, Strasbourg =

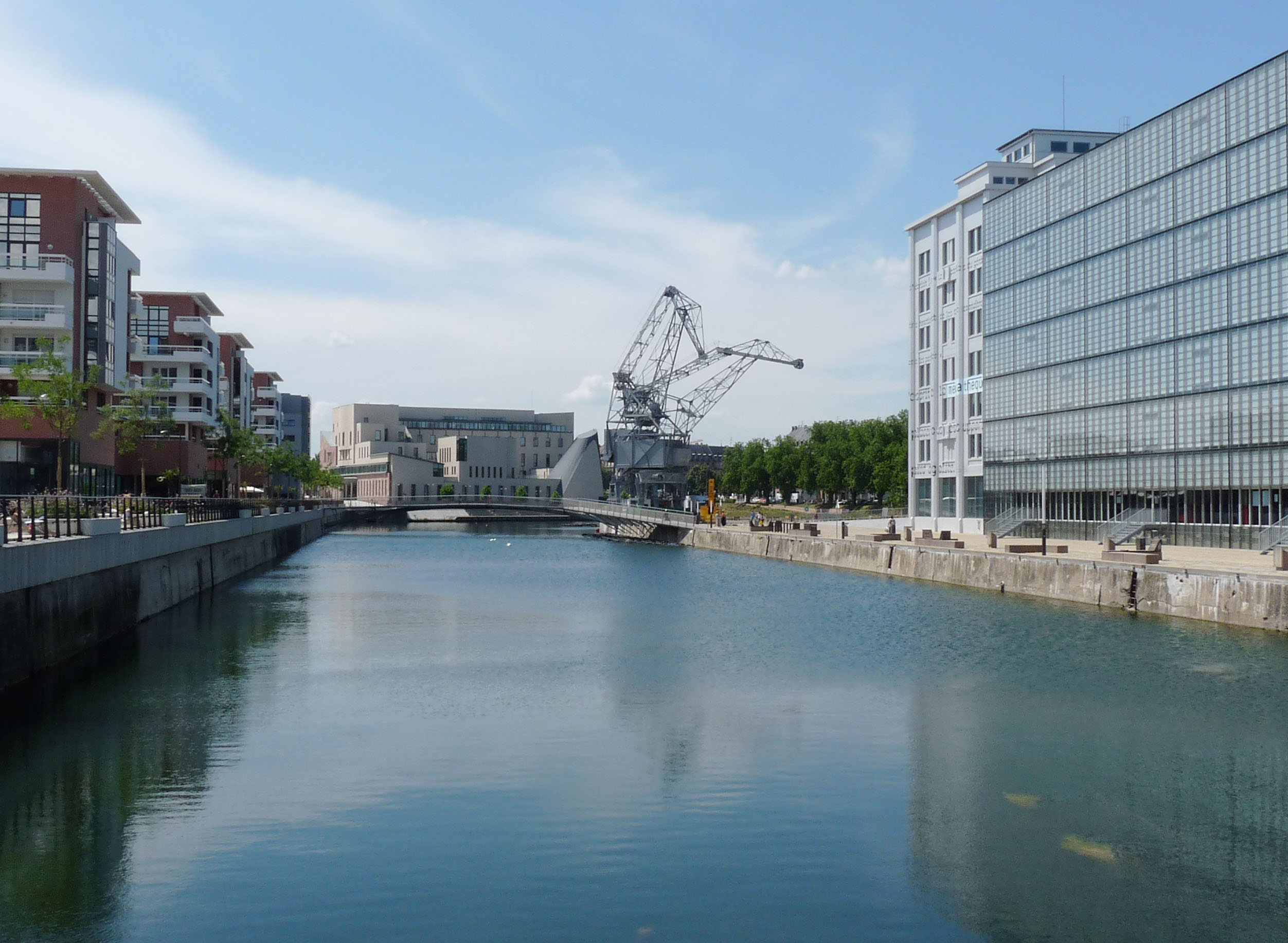
- Neudorf in June 2009

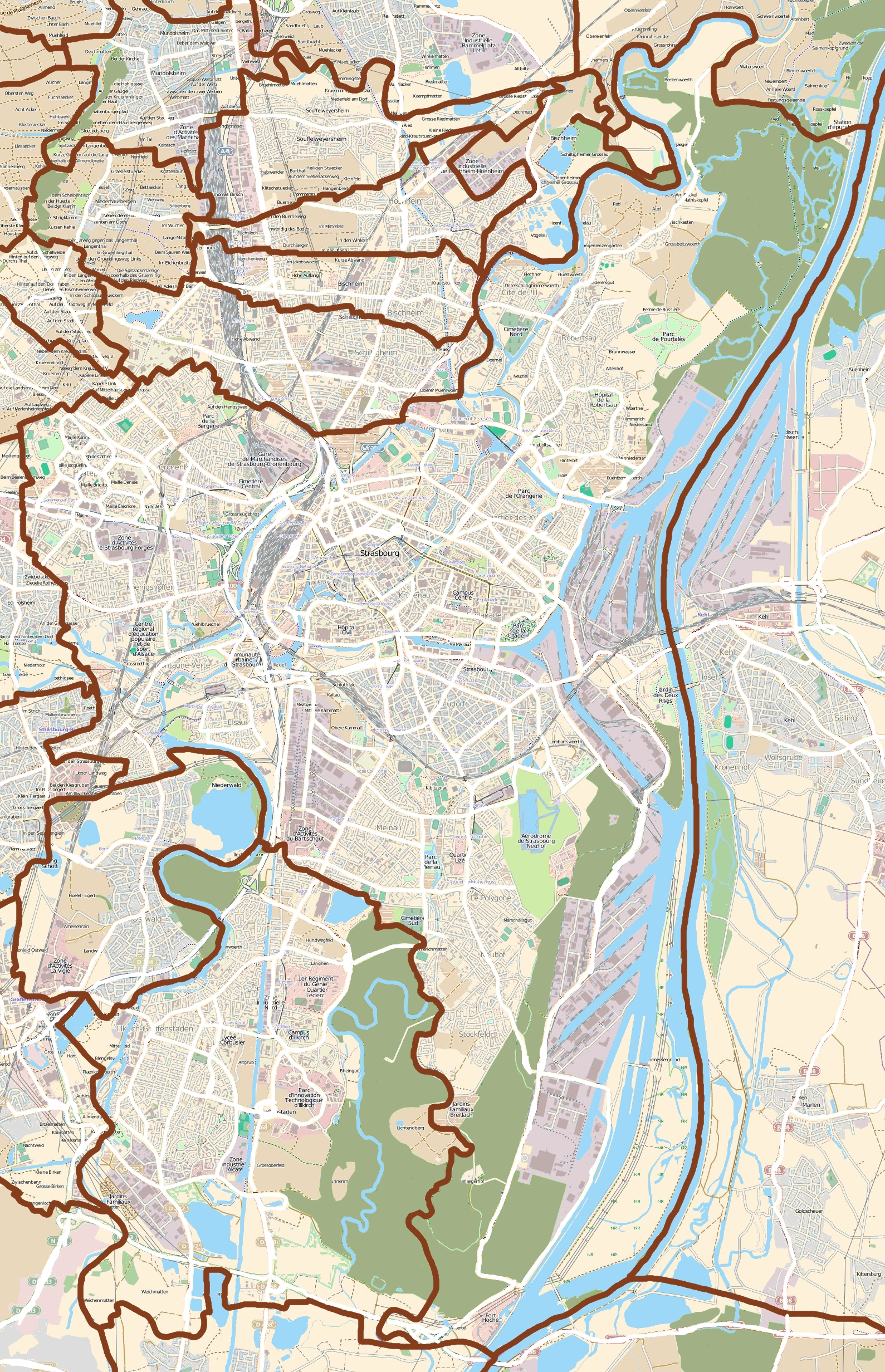
- Neudorf in relation to the city of Strasbourg
- Coordinates: 48.5148°N 7.7618°E
- Country: France
- Region: Grand Est
- Department: Bas-Rhin
- Commune: Strasbourg

Neudorf (German for "new village") is a former suburb of Strasbourg, France, and has since become a densely populated and central neighbourhood.

It is served by the Gare de Krimmeri-Meinau railway station, the last stop before the Appenweier–Strasbourg railway line enters Germany; and was previously served by the Gare de Strasbourg-Neudorf, which is now freight-only. It is administratively grouped with Musau, forming the Neudorf-Musau entity.

== History ==
=== Before 1870 ===
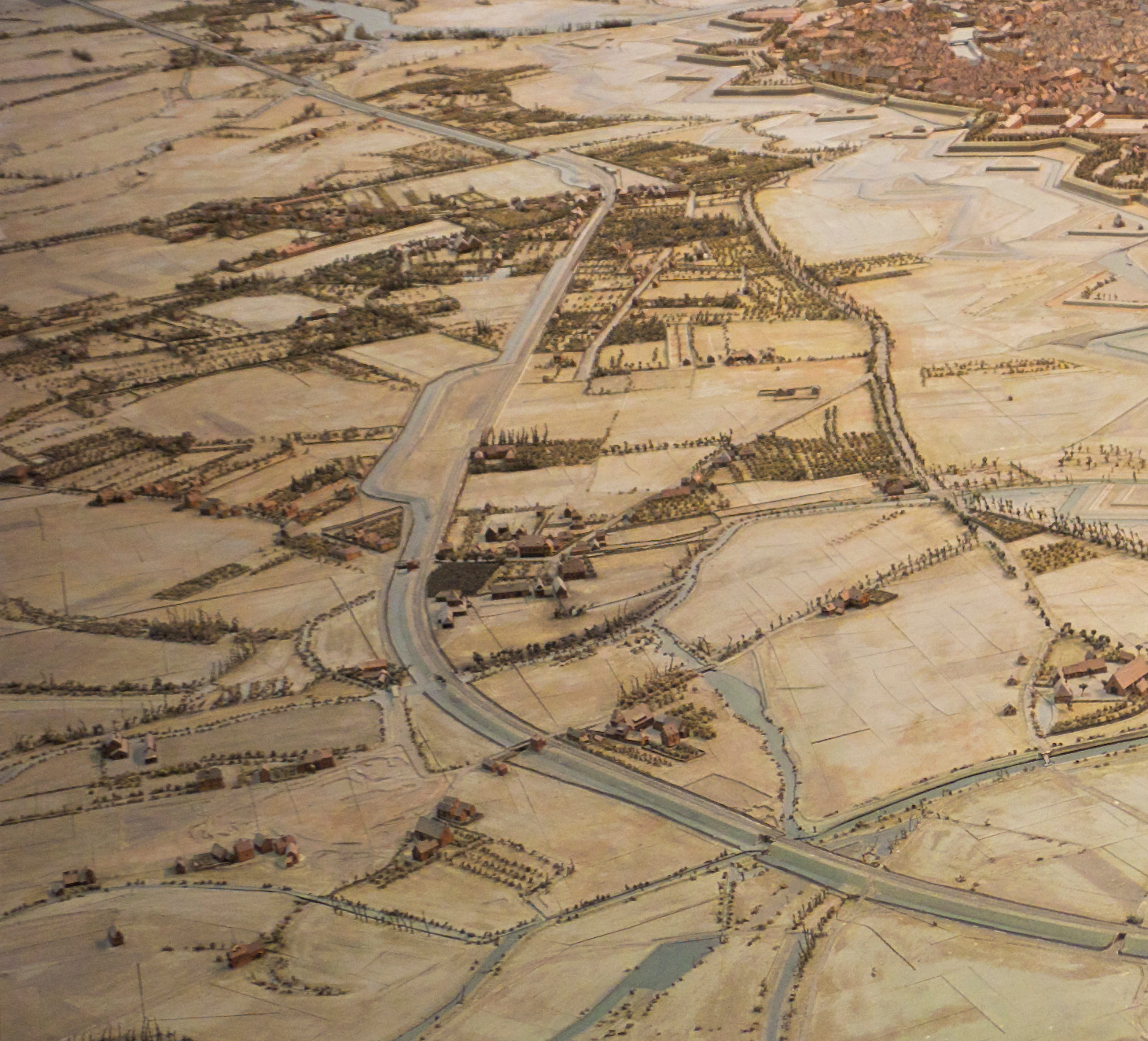
Relief plan dating from 1863

The current emplacement of Neudorf used to be a poor spot for urbanisation because of its humidity, although there used to be houses at the North, West and next of the rivers, along with mills. Development of Neudorf was also inhibited by its location at the South of Strasbourg, outside her fortifications, where there were only few gates allowing access to the city: the only crossing points were Hospital Gate (Spitaltor), Butchers' Gate (Metzgertor) and Saint Catherine Gate (Katharinentor), later completed with the gate of the citadelle. The digging of Riepberg ditch in the 16th century allowed building further North. The most ancient building still in existence are now located in Ratzendorf, next to the Rue de l'Ancienne École.

From the mid-19th century, Neudorf started developing thanks to improvement in water control, notably when the overflow canal for Ill river was built. Le quartier se peuple alors principalement de maraîchers. During the Siege of Strasbourg by the Prussians in 1870, the Northern part of the suburb was flooded when the barrages of Strasbourg were shut closed as to render the terrain difficult to cross and hinder Prussian manoeuvers. This yielded the destruction of several buildings and evacuation of the population.

=== 1871 – 1939 ===
Plan of Neudorf in 1895.

Under the German occupation of Alsace, the population of Neudorf increased by 38% between 1871 and 1875, making it the most populated neighbourhood in Strasbourg. Numerous buildings and infrastructure were built, notably Ziegelau School in 1878, Musau School in 1897, Schluthfeld in 1899, Neufeld School in 1907, Charles Frey Shelter, as well as a number of habitation buildings. Neudorf was also linked to Strasbourg by three electrified tramway lines.

In 1882, the junction canal (Umleitungskanal) was dug, allowing for building a harbour next to Hospital Gate. In 1892, a similar harbour was built at Butchers' Gte (Metzgertorhafen); this would be renamed to Port du Bassin d'Austerlitz in 1918 to annoy the Germans.

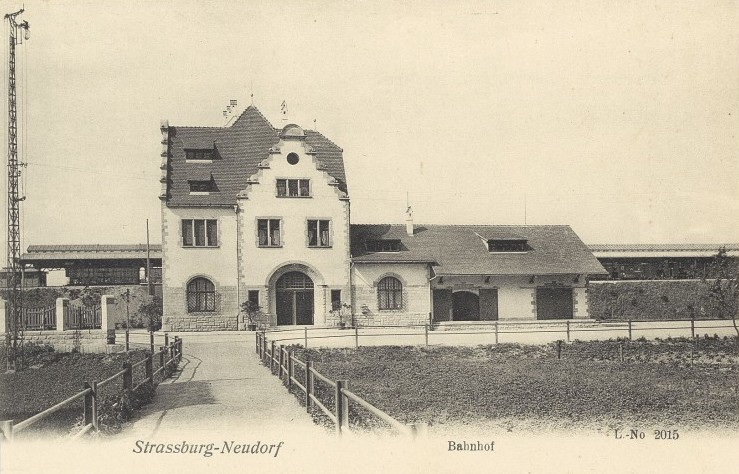
Strasbourg-Neudorf station in the early 20th century.

From the late 19th century, the railway that used to run next to Riepberg ditch, currently along Avenue Jean-Jaurès, was moved to the South of the neighbourhood, setting a Southern limit to Neudorf — the former limits have until then been the Krimmeri at the West, and the Ziegelwasser at the East. The new railway was built on an elevation of the fortifications of Strasbourg.

A shortage of housing after the First World War led to a number of building project such as cité Siegfried and cité Rissler by Paul Dopff.

=== Second World War ===
In 1939, the population of Neudorf was evacuated to Dordogne, along with that of the whole of Strasbourg. From the summer of 1940, they were allowed to return to their homes. In 1943, cinema Scala, built in 1938 on Route du Polygone, was turned into a memorial to the 214 killed and 673 wounded in the bombings of 6 September 1943, 17 November 1943 and 1 April 1944 (a plaque to be affixed in 2004 to commemorate the event). The bombing destroyed 300 buildings, notably a Protestant temple from 1885, and damaged Clinique Sainte-Odile.

=== Contemporary era ===
With the construction of numerous buildings, Neudorf has again taken an important function in the urban zone of Strasbourg. The most notable are Lycée Jean Monnet (1965), the administrative centre of Strasbourg Eurométropole in 1975, the Southern bypass (1992) and, more recently, urbanisation near Route du Rhin at the North of the neighbourhood, with a cinema and shopping centre.

By 1999, Neudorf was the most populated neighbourhood of Strasbourg, with 39,000 inhabitants.

== Urbanism ==
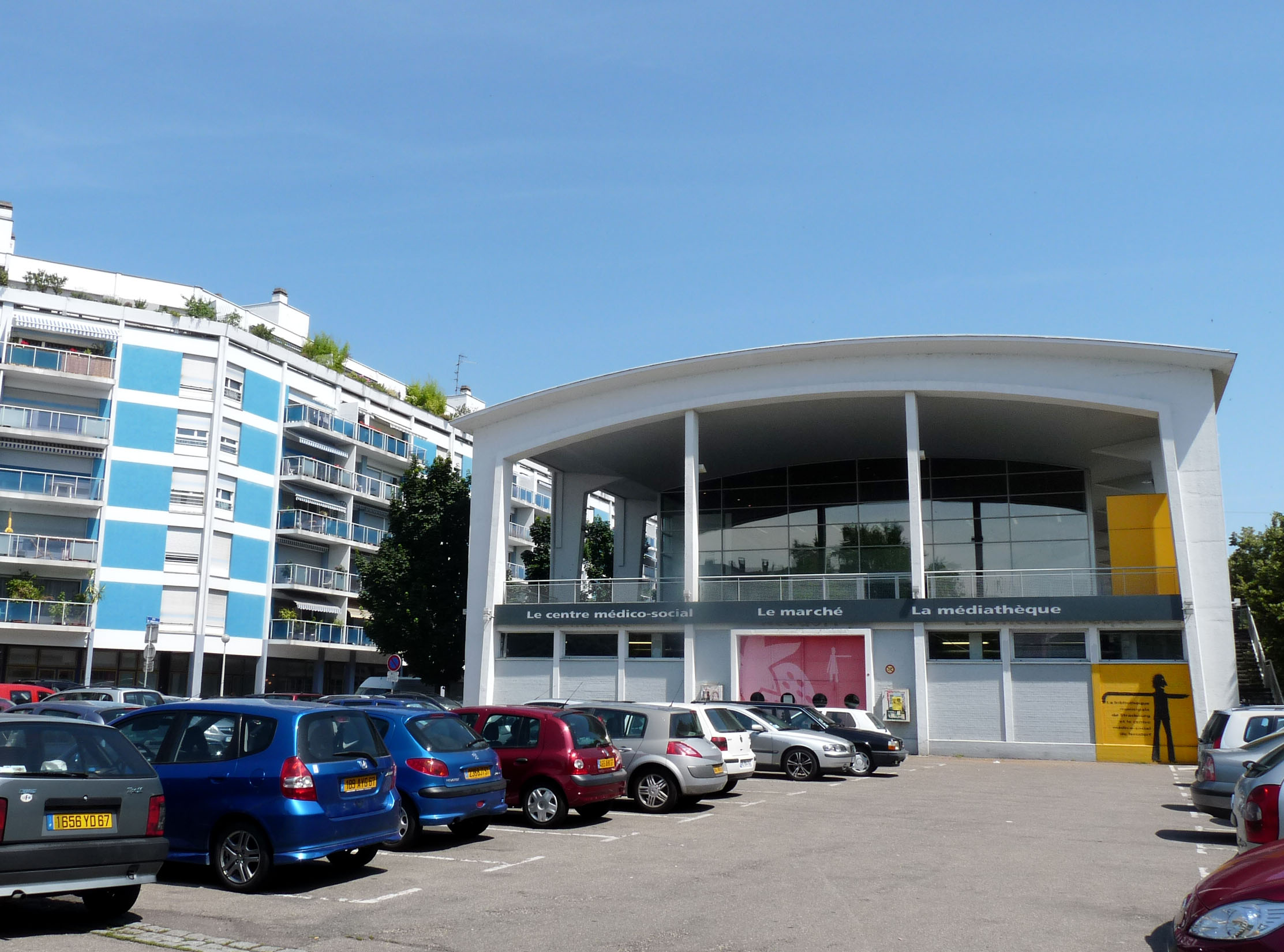
Market Hall, harbouring a market, a medico-social centre and a mediatheque.

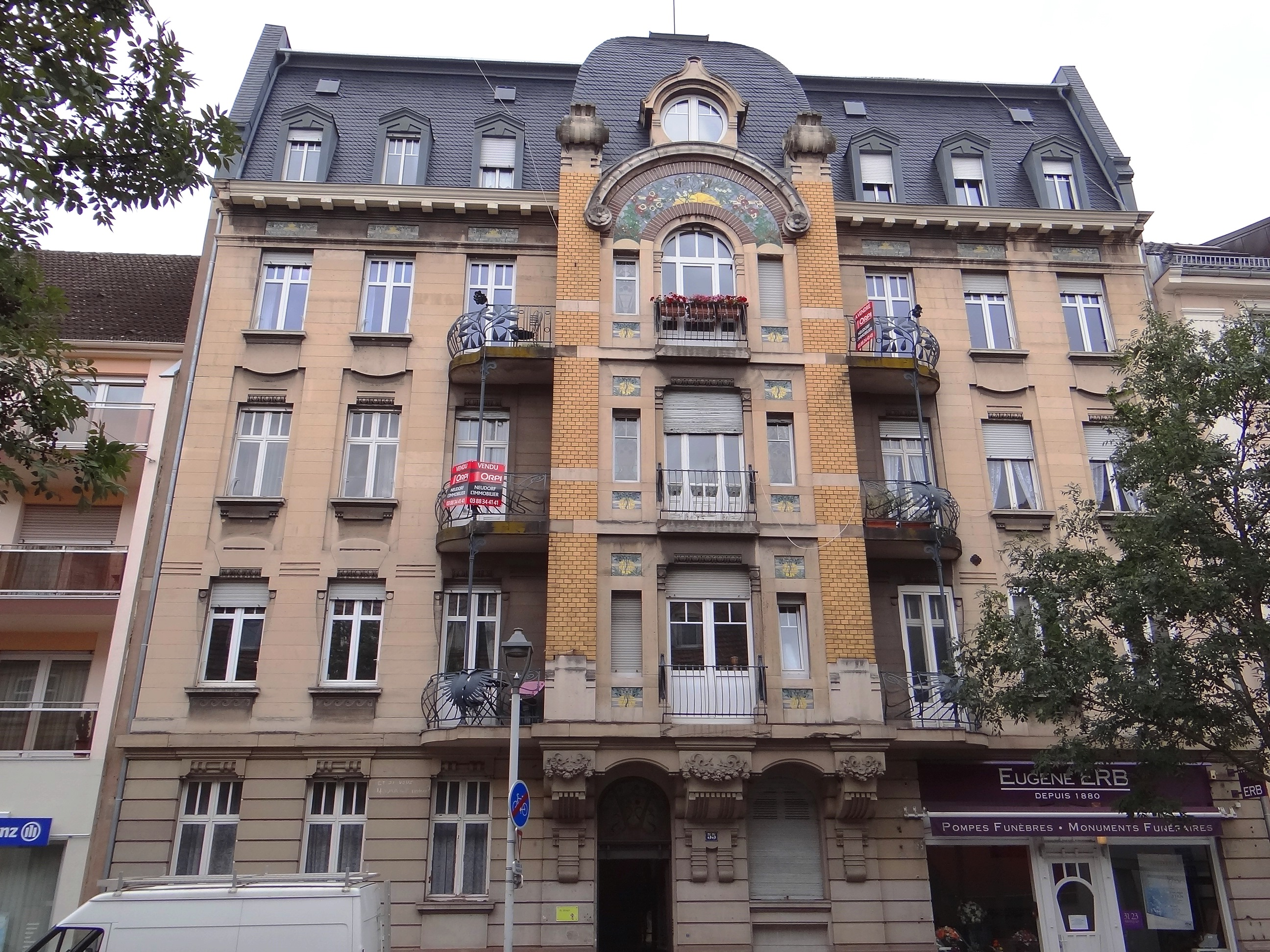
55 route du Polygone, a 1903 Art Nouveau house.

Lying South to the centre of Strasbourg, Neudorf is bordered by the Montagne Verte and the Elsau on the West, by the Meinau and Neuhof neighbourhoods on the South, by the Port du Rhin on the East, and by the quartier de la Bourse and Esplanade on the North. It is separated from the centre by a long strip of less urbanised land, inheritor of the firing field of the city walls, and of the harbour canal and its installations.

Neudorf is organised around Route du Polygone and Place du Marché, its main centre. The square is bordered by two installations: the Scala, a former cinema built in the 1930s and now rebuilt as a spectacle hall and brewery, and market hall, which harbours a market as well as a medico-social centre and a mediatheque.
