= Kehl station =

Railway station in Kehl, Germany

Coordinates: 48°34′37″N 7°48′31″E

Kehl
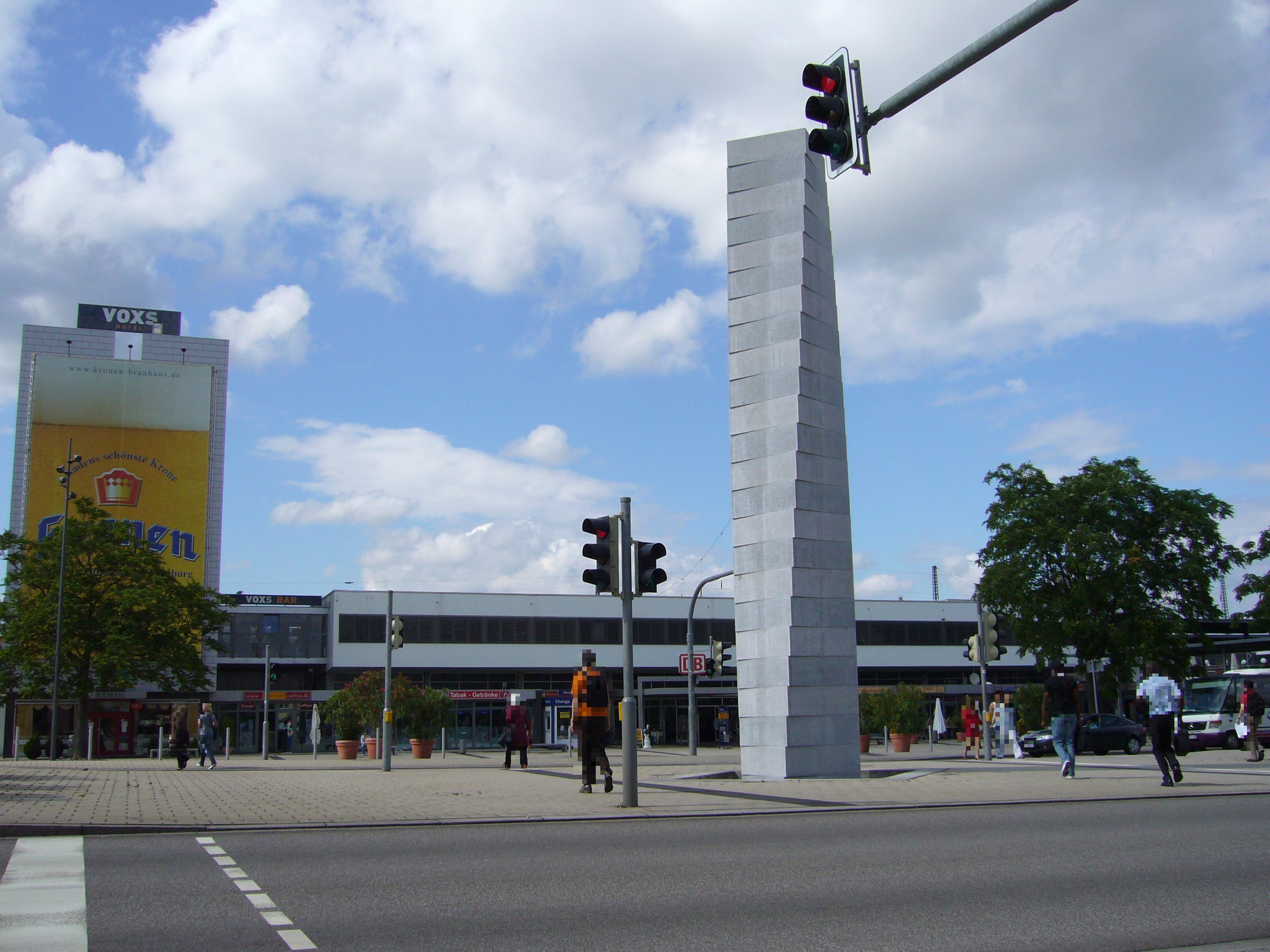
- Kehl station, 2007

General information
- Location: Kehl, Baden-Württemberg; Germany
- Line: Appenweier–Strasbourg railway
- Connections: Strasbourg Trams

Other information
- Station code: n/a
- Category: 3
- Fare zone: TGO: 2
Location

Kehl station is a railway station in Kehl, a town in southwestern Germany in the Ortenaukreis, Baden-Württemberg. It is situated on the Appenweier–Strasbourg railway, with trains crossing the Rhine into France to reach the latter destination. Both sides being within the Schengen Area, no passport or border controls apply.

== History ==
The line opened in 1844.

Since June 2007, TGV trains run from Paris Est to Strasbourg, Stuttgart and Munich. Therefore, since 10 June 2007 the Ortenau-S-Bahn has operated railcars every hour (and sometimes every half-hour) between Offenburg and Strasbourg. This change extended previous services to Strasbourg including services formerly ending in Kehl.

== Services ==
=== Regional ===
Preceding station	(Offenburg)	Following station
Krimmeri-Meinau towards Strasbourg-Ville	RS 4	Kork towards Offenburg

=== Trams ===
Since 29 April 2017, Strasbourg's tram line D has been running to Kehl and used to terminate at Kehl station. Since November 2018, the tram continues to and terminates at the "Kehl Rathaus" (town hall) in the town centre.
