= Krimmeri-Meinau station =

Railway station in Strasbourg, France

Coordinates: 48.5636°N 7.7527°E

Krimmeri-Meinau
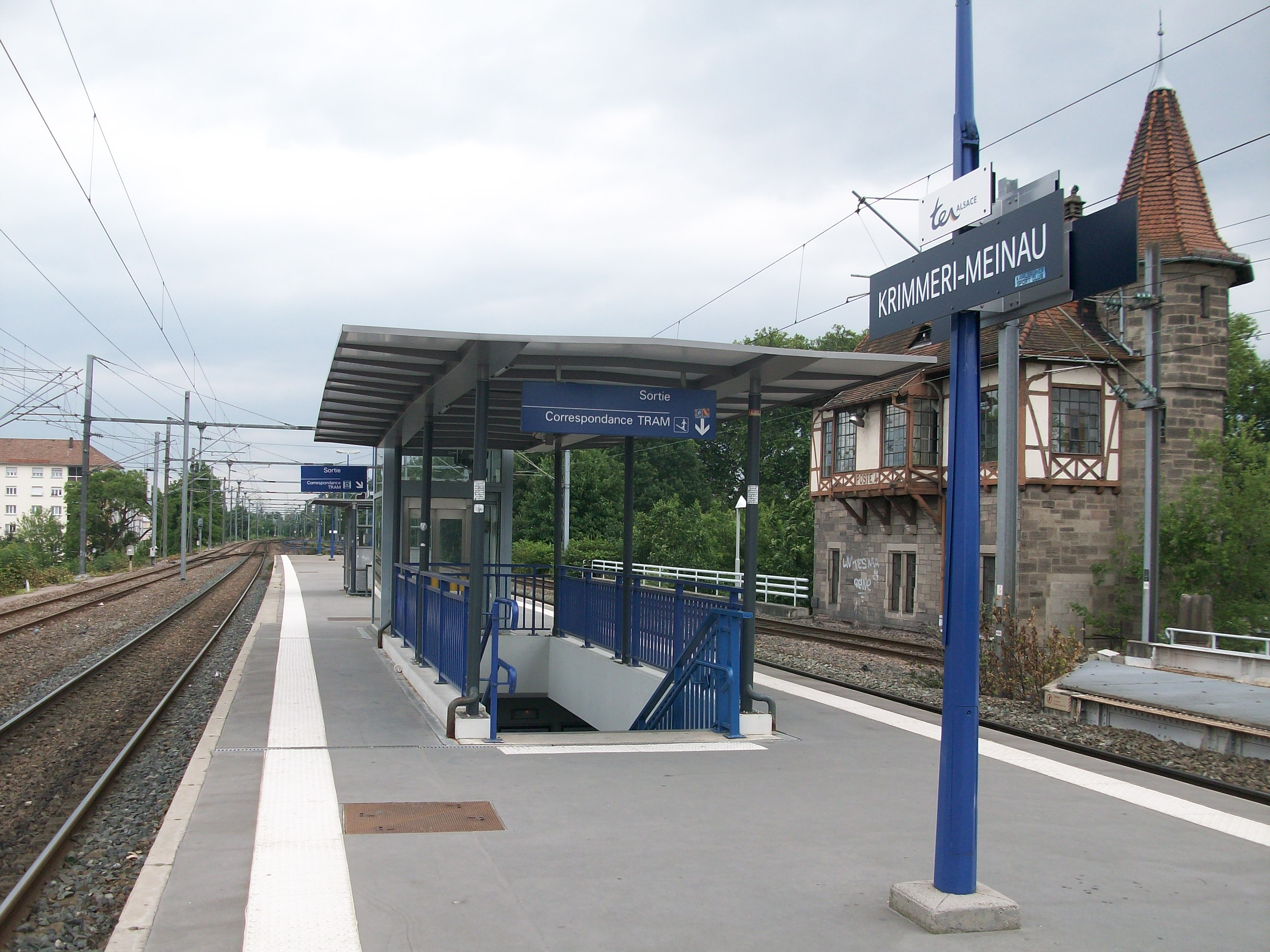

General information
- Location: Avenue de Colmar; 67100 Strasbourg; Bas-Rhin, France
- Owner: SNCF
- Operator: SNCF
- Line: Appenweier–Strasbourg railway
- Tracks: 2

Other information
- Station code: 87338525

History
- Opened: 2003

Services
Preceding station	(Offenburg)	Following station
Strasbourg-Ville Terminus	RS 4	Kehl towards Offenburg
Location

Krimmeri-Meinau station (French: Gare de Krimmeri-Meinau) is the last passenger station before the German border on the Appenweier–Strasbourg railway line. Both sides being within the Schengen Area, no passport or border controls apply.

The station is situated in the Neudorf quarter of Strasbourg. The station is served by regional trains (TER Grand Est) to Strasbourg and Offenburg.

== See also ==
- List of SNCF stations in Grand Est
