= Michele Deconet =

French musician

Michele Deconet (1713—1799) was a violinist and maker of string instruments. Born in Kehl, Margravate of Baden. he worked as a travelling violinist in France and Italy. He eventually settled in Venice where he resided until his death.

== Early life ==
Deconet was born in Kehl, near Strasbourg, in 1713 to Pietro Deconet. As an adolescent, Deconet joined military service thinking it would provide him an opportunity to travel and satisfy his curiosity of the world. It is thought that he learned how to play the violin during his time as a soldier. However, after only two years as a soldier, Deconet left Paris to make a long and trying journey to Venice. In 1732, at the age of 19, he worked his way from Paris to Venice as that of a traveling musician, stopping in villages throughout the French and Italian countryside. Even though he continued to eventually travel on, he chose Venice as his base of operations in later years.

== Marriages ==
After arriving in Venice, Deconet married the forty-year-old widow, Anna Chiaparota. She died later the same year on November 10. Ignoring the usual rules of mourning, Deconet remarried very soon after in 1744. His new wife was 20-year-old Paola Stecherle, a woman who made a living cooking in small restaurants around Venice. Before wedding Deconet, she lived with a butcher in San Marcuola in Venice. A witness to the marriage, Giuseppe Salbego (known as Mioli), was a tailor and good friend of Deconet. He stated at the wedding, “I have known him for four or five years because he lives in San Giovanni in Bragara where he has lived since his first wife’s death – seven or eight months. I have met frequently with him since his widowhood and I know he has not other marriage obligations or promises.”

Soon after the wedding, the couple moved to San Zeminian to an apartment. It is here that Deconet's first children were born; Matilda (9 February 1745) and Giovanna (3 April 1747). He had many more children after moving house to Bragora; Teresa in 1753, Francesco in 1756, GioBatta in 1757, GioBatta Andrea in 1762, and Antonio and Giuseppe (born outside Venice). Antonio and Giuseppe would also become violinist like their father.

== Violins ==
Deconet was often traveling outside of Venice, and therefore it is not plausible that he ever held an apprenticeship. Apprenticeships required regular attendance and would not have paid enough to support his family. All documents in reference to Deconet list him as a sonadore, which means "player".

Deconet most likely took previously bought violins with him on his travels and resold them at fairs and markets, where he would play and showcase his talent. This theory could explain the varying labels, some handwritten, that he or his buyers would place upon the instruments to remember its origins and garner publicity.

Analysis of instruments attributed to Deconet seem to confirm this theory. All of "his" instruments are obviously of Venetian making, but there are huge differences in style, form, and workmanship. Limited instruments with his label between 1750 and 1760 reveal a probable privileged source of violins from some Venetian maker who was interested in profit. The changes of style of the instruments can be explained by changes of sources for the instruments, as they are seemingly incoherent for the usual artisan development changes.

His instruments have features that are typical of Venetian violin makers of the time, such as Pietro Guarnieri and Giorgio Serafin. Violins made in workshops were rarely the work of the maestro (means master), but usually made by the many workers. Instruments made by the workers were generally of the same quality, but much cheaper. Cheaper instruments led to Deconet making a profit.

While Deconet lived in Bragara, he lived next to Domenico Garlato, "a violin maker with a workshop in his home and three sons," and Giacomo Codeghin, "a violin maker without a family living in Calle della Morte." It is extremely likely that Deconet bought instruments for resale from these violin makers.

== Bibliography ==
- Pio Stefano, "Liuteri and Sonadori, Venice 1750 -1870" Ed. Venice research 2002, ISBN 9788890725210
