= Strasbourg tramway =

Tramway network in Strasbourg

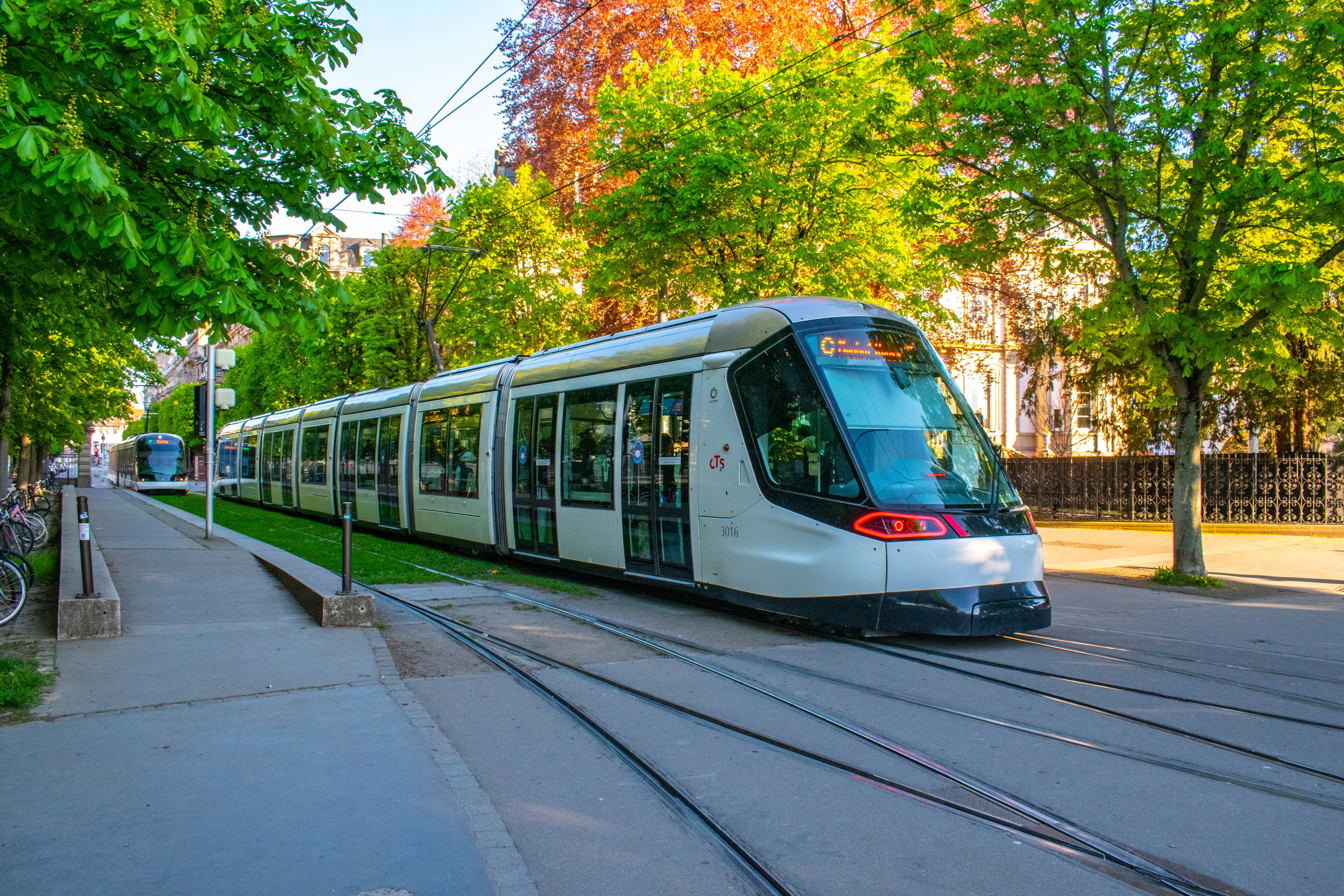
- A Citadis 2G tram passing through République station (2022)

Overview
- Native name: Tramway de Strasbourg; Straßenbahn Straßburg; D' Strossabàhn Strossburi(g)
- Owner: Strasbourg Eurométropole
- Locale: Strasbourg-Ortenau Eurodistrict
- Transit type: Tram
- Number of lines: 6
- Number of stations: 86
- Daily ridership: 457,000 (bus + tram, 2018)
- Annual ridership: 72.25 million (tram only, 2018)

Operation
- Began operation: 26 November 1994
- Operator: CTS
- Number of vehicles: 94

Technical
- System length: 49.1 km (30.5 mi)
- No. of tracks: 2
- Track gauge: 1,435 mm (4 ft 8 1/2 in) standard gauge
- Electrification: 750 V DC Overhead line
System map
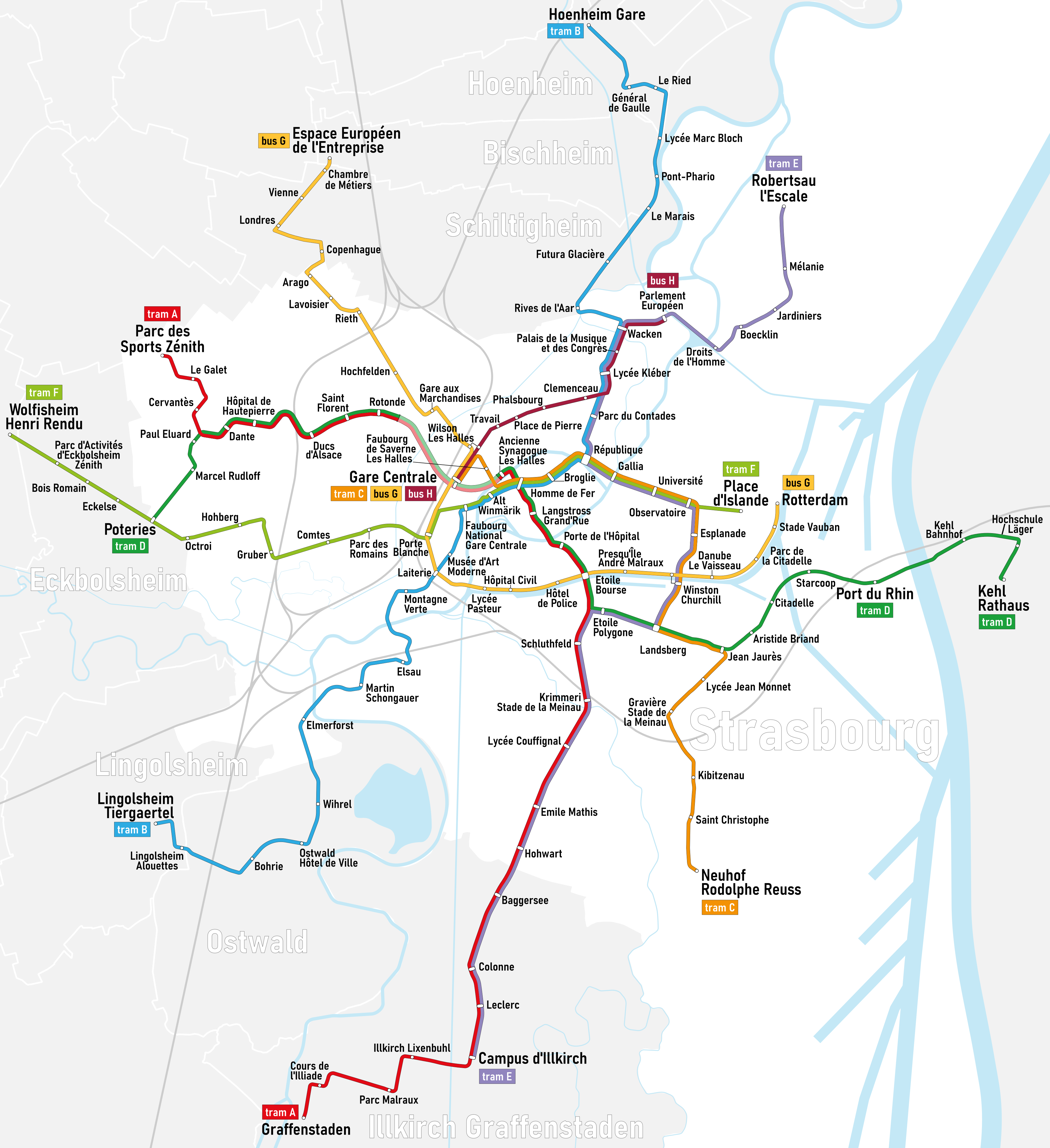
Map of Strasbourg tramway

The Strasbourg tramway (French: Tramway de Strasbourg, German: Straßenbahn Straßburg; Alsatian: D'Strossabàhn Strossburi(g)), run by the CTS, is a network of six tramlines, A, B, C, D, E and F that operate in the cities of Strasbourg in Alsace, France, and Kehl in Baden-Württemberg, Germany. It is one of the few tram networks to cross an international border, along with the trams of Basel, Geneva and Saarbrücken. The first tramline in Strasbourg, which was originally horse-drawn, opened in 1878. After 1894, when an electric-powered tram system was introduced, a widespread network of tramways was built, including several longer-distance lines on both sides of the Rhine.

Use of the system declined from the 1930s onwards, and the service closed in 1960 in parallel with many other tramways at the time. However, a strategic reconsideration of the city's public transport requirements led to the reconstruction of the system, a development whose success led to other large French cities reopening their tramways, such as Montpellier and Nice. Lines A and D were opened in 1994, lines B and C were opened in 2000, line E was opened in 2007 and line F was opened in 2010. It is regarded as a remarkable example of the tramway's rebirth in the 1990s. Together with the success seen in Nantes since 1985, the Strasbourg experiment resulted in the construction of tramways in multiple other French urban areas, and the expansion of tramway systems remains an ongoing project in Strasbourg and throughout France. Since 2017, the tram system also reaches Kehl on the right bank of the Rhine, in Germany. While the prior tram network also included such a Rhine-crossing line at times, this section of the Rhine did not form the border between France and Germany from 1871 to the end of World War I and during World War II when Alsace (including Strasbourg) was annexed to Germany.

== History ==
The first tram line in Strasbourg, which was originally horse-drawn, opened in 1878. After 1894, when an electric-powered tram system was introduced, a widespread network of tramways was built in the largest city of Alsace, including also several longer-distance lines on both sides of the Rhine. The decline of the tramways system began in the 1930s, and ended with the retirement of the service in 1960. After a long drawn out communal political decision process, the tram was reintroduced in 1994. As part of the redevelopment of the city, a track of a total 33 km distance was built, on which 5 tram line services have been developed.

=== Horse-drawn trams ===
On 5 April 1877 the Strasbourg Horse Railway Company ("Straßburger Pferde-Eisenbahngesellschaft") was founded, and the name changed on 25 April 1888 to the Strasbourg Tramway Company ("Straßburger Straßenbahngesellschaft"). Since May 1897, the AEG electrical manufacturing company was the main shareholder. In 1912 the company was transferred to the possession of the city of Strasbourg. When Alsace became part of France in November 1918, the name of the company was translated into French, "Compagnie des tramways strasbourgeois" (CTS). In this form it still exists today.

Public transport in Strasbourg had begun in 1848 with horse-drawn omnibuses and carriages. The first standard gauge tracks of the Horse/Railway Company were opened on 20 July 1878. These passed through the areas of "Hönheim" and "zur Kehler Brücke". In the inner city, horses were used. In the suburbs, small steam locomotives drew the carriages. By 1885 further lines to the suburbs of Königshofen, Robertsau, Neuhof and Wolfisheim were opened, and in 1886 the meter gauge was first used in extending the track to Grafenstaden.

=== Electric trams (1894–1960) ===
The electric company of AEG was engaged to install electric traction of that line in December 1894. Though the contract between town and company had included the maintaining of standard gauge, since 1897, the standard gauge tracks were converted to one-meter gauge. New lines were built and run to Kronenburg, Lingolsheim and Breuschwickersheim. In addition to the network in town, an overland network was built, mainly worked with steam traction, extending from Strasbourg to the Vosges Mountains, Colmar and across the Rhine into Baden.

After in 1918 Strasbourg had become French, the 1920 all lines east of the Rhine (almost 50% of the overland network or 35% of the total network) were taken over at first by the shortly founded general German railway company of Deutsche Reichseisenbahnen, then in 1922 by the regional Mittelbadische Eisenbahnen (Central Baden Railways).

In 1930, the network comprised 234 km of track, about 100 km in town and 130 km overland lines, all in France. There were 55 million passengers in 1930 and 71.5 million passengers in 1943.

=== The closing of the original tramway ===
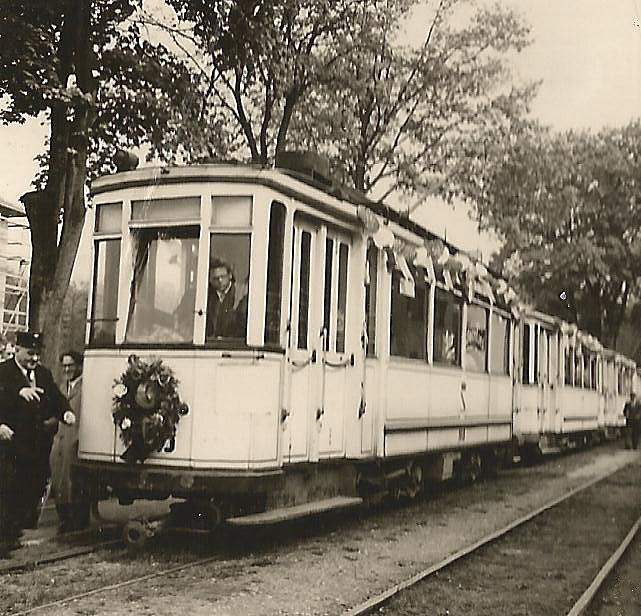
Last tram ride on 1 May 1960

In the 1950s, the tram, already weakened by World War II, faced competition from other modes of transport such as the bus, the bicycle and the private automobile. The tram system was abandoned in 1960 and replaced by buses; the last tram ran on 1 May 1960 and carried a black wreath to resemble a funeral procession. Much of the traffic was absorbed by the private automobile.

== Reintroduction (1994) ==
=== The debate: tram or light metro? ===
Owing to increasing traffic and pollution, the Urban Community of Strasbourg considered building a Véhicule Automatique Léger network with two lines. The choice of rapid transit system became a major point of debate at the 1989 municipal elections, with the incumbent right-wing majority favouring the VAL, while the opposition Socialists campaigned for a modern tramway.

Shopkeepers in the city centre were also in favour of the VAL, on the grounds that the construction of the tramway and subsequent loss of parking spaces would deter customers. Meanwhile, the opposition campaigning for the tramway emphasised its cost-efficiency relative to the VAL (1 kilometre of VAL track cost as much to build as 4 kilometres of tramway) and the revitalization and pedestrianization of the city centre that the construction of the tramway entailed.

=== Victory of the tramway ===
With Catherine Trautmann's election as mayor of Strasbourg, the VAL project was abandoned in favour of the tramway.

The first line, line A, opened on 25 November 1994. At 9.8 kilometres long, it signalled the return of the tramway to Strasbourg. It was the fourth modern tram system in France. The line ran from the western suburb of Hautepierre to Illkirch-Graffenstaden (Baggersee station). In order to cross the railway lines near the Strasbourg railway station, a 1 400 m long tunnel was dug with a tunnel boring machine. Situated 17 m under ground in this tunnel and between the Rotonde and Ancienne Synagogue/Les Halles stations, is the Gare Centrale station, serving Strasbourg's railway station.

Artists were commissioned to create artworks relating to the city. In particular, the Oulipo was responsible for writing short texts on the columns in the stations, but with the following four constraints:

- Homophonic variations: sentences formed from the syllables in the sentence ' Le tramway de Strasbourg ' (e.g. Les trois mouettes de Strauss: pour) form the basis of a short story ending with the aforementioned sentence.
- Toponymic inscriptions: written in the style of a dictionary entry, they present a fictional etymology for each station name.
- The récit au beau présent is a story written only with the letters present in the station name.
- Finally, there are proverbs which have been transformed by the addition of the word 'tram' or 'tramway'.

The construction of the network was accompanied by town-planning operations, with the intention of promoting city-centre access by tram. Park and ride facilities were also built near suburban stations in order to encourage motorists to use the tram. Indeed, the rationale behind the reintroduction of the tramway was the perceived negative effect of the automobile's omnipresence in the city (pollution, congestion, disorderly parking). With the construction of the tramway, the city centre was pedestrianised and parking in the city centre was reduced via out-of-town park and ride facilities. Access to the city centre was closed off to cars in 1992.

In 1995, Trautmann was re-elected which gave a signal to other mayors of French cities that opening a tram is beneficial for re-election.

== Extensions ==
=== First phase (1998) ===
On 4 July 1998, a first extension began: line A was extended 2.8 km further south into Illkirch-Graffenstaden. Just under two months later, on 31 August 1998, line D (Rotonde – Étoile – Polygone) entered service thanks to a short branch near the Place de l'Étoile. This new line uses the line A track for most of its journey, enabling higher tram frequencies in the city centre.

=== Second phase (2000) ===
The network was further extended on 1 September 2000 as line B and C (total length: 11.9 km) entered service. They both originate from the same terminus, situated in Elsau, a residential area. They share a trunk line which leads to the city centre, crossing it from the south-east to the north-west. At the Homme de Fer station, the lines cross the track of lines A and D. This junction became the centre of the network. The two lines diverge at the République station: line C leads to the terminus in the Esplanade district via the university area, while line B heads north, serving the Wacken exhibition centre. It then passes through the communes of Schiltigheim and Bischheim before reaching the Hoenheim terminus, in the commune of Hoenheim.

=== Link with regional rail (2002) ===
In September 2002, the Hoenheim terminus was linked to the Alsace regional train (TER) on the Strasbourg-Lauterbourg line. A year later, a new exchange was created at Krimmeri-Meinau: a railway station was built next to the eponymous tram stop, allowing transfers between line A (and line E in 2007) and regional trains running on the Strasbourg-Offenburg line.

=== Third phase (2007) ===
The tramway remained largely unchanged until 2007, when a new wave of extensions was completed. These extensions should have been finished in 2006, but were delayed by appeals lodged by several associations and three individuals (including two Green Party councillors)

On 25 August 2007 lines C and D were extended, and line E entered service. Line D was extended to a new terminus (Aristide Briand), while line C was lengthened by 4.2 km, taking it into the heart of Neuhof, which had previously been enclaved in southern Strasbourg. The two lines share a common track for 600m between Landsberg and Jean Jaures stations. The extensions also created a new north–south route serving the eastern part of the city. Meanwhile, line E brought about a major change in the network, since it was the first branch line. Sharing track with the other lines between Wacken and Baggersee, one of its objectives was to reduce transfer traffic at Homme de Fer, a station not served by the line.

Line E was extended by 2.5 km from Wacken to a new terminus, Robertsau Boecklin, on 23 November 2007, thus servicing buildings in the European district, such as the European Parliament.

=== Fourth phase (2008) ===
Line B was extended in two phases in 2008. The first extension, shifting the southern terminus from Elsau to Ostwald Hotel de Ville, was completed on 30 January 2008. The second phase was completed on 22 May 2008, further extending this part of the line to Lingolsheim Tiergaertel. The total length of these two extensions is 4.9 km, and the entire 2007–2008 extension project was completed at a cost of €397.5m.

These extensions transformed a cross-shaped network, centred on Homme de Fer, into a lattice shape, with two lines running in tandem along key routes in the city centre. This enabled more transfers and more direct links between stations, along with greater frequency in the city centre. This scheme is unique in France, but similar to systems in Switzerland and Germany.

On considerable sections of track, the current network retraces the old network: Porte de l'hopital – Campus d'Illkirch (line A); Etoile Polygone – Aristide Briand (line D); Graviere – Neuhof Rudolphe Reuss (line C); Montagne Verte – Homme de Fer – Gallia (line B); place de Bordeaux – Wacken and Droits de l'Homme – Robertsau Boecklin (line E); Gare centrale – Pont de Saverne (line C) and Pont de Saverne – Homme de Fer (line A) – around 14.4 km in total. The Homme de Fer station did not exist on the old network: there was a station nearby in the Rue de la Haute Montée, currently crossed by lines B, C and F, while the Place Kléber was the main hub. Place de la République and place du Polygone were important nodes in the old network. Trams crossed the city centre from north to south via the Rue des Grandes Arcades and the Rue du Vieux Marché aux Poissons: otherwise, the current line A is a reconstitution of the old line 6/16, taken out of service on 1 January 1960.

=== First tram-train phase (2010) ===
Two new sections were finished in 2010: Gare Centrale – Homme de Fer via Faubourg de Saverne, and Observatoire – Place d'Islande. The former was built in anticipation of the (now abandoned) tram-train line project and entered service on 27 November 2010. Line C abandoned the Homme de Fer-Elsau section, taking the Homme de Fer – Faubourg de Saverne – Gare Centrale route instead. The next day, a citizen's initiative prompted Line F's introduction, serving the Elsau-Place d'Islande route, which included the Homme de Fer – Elsau section that line C had abandoned.

=== Further extensions (2013 onwards) ===
In 2013, both line A and line D were extended in the northwest. New tracks were built for both lines on 1 kilometre (0.62 mi) for each. Line D saw the opening of three new stations (Paul Éluard, Marcel Rudloff and Poteries) and line A, of two new stations (Le Galet and Parc des Sports). The name of Hautepierre Maillon station on line A was changed to Cervantès.

In late 2013, work started on a further extension of line A, from Illkirch-Lixenbuhl to the town centre of Illkirch-Graffenstaden. The extension opened on 23 April 2016, providing 1.8 kilometres (1.1 mi) of extra route and three extra stops. It cost €37m, of which the Strasbourg Eurométropole provided €29m, the French government contributed €5·3m, and €1·5m came from the Bas-Rhin département.

On 15 November 2025 Line F extended four kilometres from Comtes to Wolfisheim.

=== Extension to Kehl ===
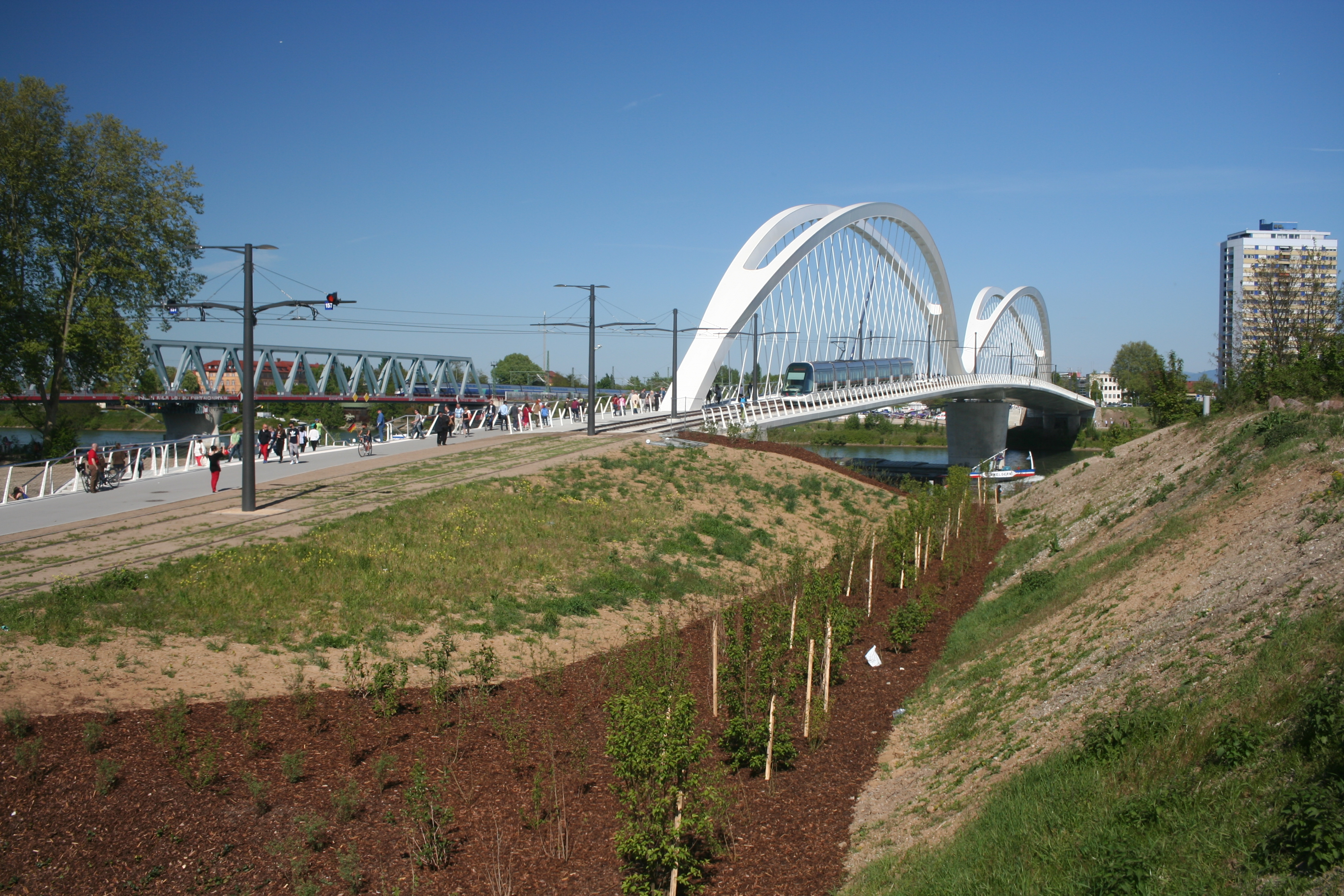
Beatus Rhenanus Bridge across the Rhine to Kehl

An extension of line D from the former terminus at Aristide Briand to Kehl in Germany is now in operation, since 28 April 2017. Construction on this extension involved the building of a new bridge across the Rhine, Beatus Rhenanus Bridge, starting in February 2014. This extension travels the distance from the former terminus through the rest of Strasbourg, to the bridge over the Rhine terminating at Kehl station. A further extension to Kehl Rathaus was planned to open by the end of 2017. The extension as of 2018 included three new stops in France and one in Germany; two more were added in Germany with the subsequent extension opening in 2018. According to early reports, within the first month of operation, the new extension to Kehl's main railway station saw around 10,000 daily users. The extension now serves Hochschule Kehl and Kehl City Hall, allowing easier access to the city center.

== Current network ==
As of 31 August 2020, the network has 6 lines and a total line length of 65 kilometres (40 mi). However, due to the fact that many lines overlap with each other, the route length is only 49.8 km (30.9 mi). The system's hub is Homme de Fer, a station in the city centre where 5 of the 6 lines intersect. In the pedestrianized city centre, the tram shares space with pedestrians and bicycles. In the suburbs, the tram shares the road with automobiles, but trams are not subjected to the rules of the road, in common with other French tramways. Instead, the tram uses its own dedicated signalling system, benefitting from priority over other traffic at all junctions.

The six lines are:

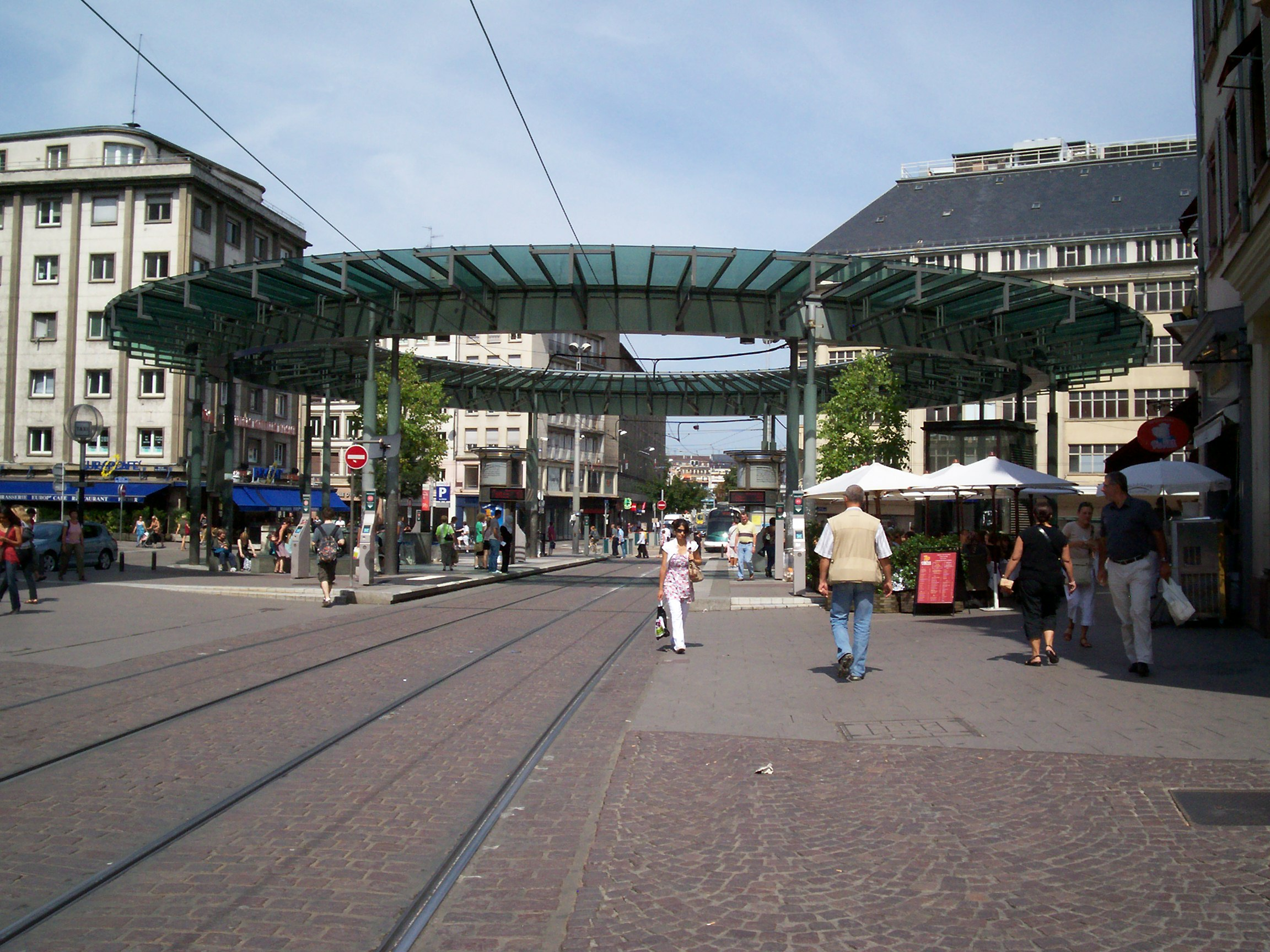
Homme de Fer

A	Parc des Sports – Le Galet – Cervantès – Dante – Hôpital de Hautepierre – Ducs d'Alsace – Saint-Florent – Rotonde – Gare Centrale (underground) – Ancienne Synagogue Les Halles – Homme de Fer – Langstross Grand Rue – Porte de l'Hôpital – Etoile Bourse – Etoile Polygone – Schluthfeld – Krimmeri Stade de la Meinau – Émile Mathis – Hohwart – Baggersee – Colonne – Leclerc – Campus d'Illkirch – Illkirch Lixenbuhl – Illkirch Graffenstaden	15.3 km
B	Lingolsheim Tiergaertel – Lingolsheim Alouettes – Borie – Ostwald Hôtel de Ville – Wihrel – Elmerforst – Martin Schongauer – Elsau – Montagne Verte – Laiterie – Musée d'Art Moderne – Faubourg National – Alt Winmärik (Vieux Marché aux Vins) – Homme de Fer – Place Broglie – République – Parc du Contades – Lycée Kléber – Wacken – Rives de l'Aar – Futura Glacière – Le Marais – Pont Phario – Lycée Marc Bloch – Le Ried – Général de Gaulle – Hoenheim Gare	14.7 km
C	Gare Centrale – Faubourg de Saverne – Homme de Fer – Place Broglie – République – Gallia – Université – Observatoire – Esplanade – Winston Churchill – Landsberg – Jean Jaurès – Lycée Jean Monnet – Gravière – Kibitzenau – Saint Christophe – Neuhof Rodolphe Reuss	8.1 km
D	Poteries – Marcel Rudloff – Paul Eluard – Dante – Hôpital de Hautepierre – Ducs d'Alsace – Saint-Florent – Rotonde – Gare Centrale (underground) – Ancienne Synagogue Les Halles – Homme de Fer – Langstross Grand Rue – Porte de l'Hôpital – Étoile Bourse – Étoile Polygone – Landsberg – Jean Jaurès – Aristide Briand – Citadelle – Starcoop – Port du Rhin – Kehl Bahnhof – Hochschule / Läger – Kehl Rathaus	8.7 km
E	Campus d'Illkirch – Hohwart – Lycée Couffignal – Krimmeri Meinau – Schluthfeld – Etoile Polygone – Landsberg – Winston Churchill – Esplanade – Observatoire – Université – Gallia – République – Parc du Contades – Lycée Kléber – Wacken – Parlement Européen – Droits de L'Homme – Robertsau Boecklin – Jardiniers – Mélanie – Robertsau L′Escale	13.6 km
F	Comtes – Parc des Romains – Porte Blanche –Faubourg National – Alt Winmärik (Vieux Marché aux Vins) – Homme de Fer – Place Broglie – République – Gallia – Université – Observatoire – Place d'Islande	7.32 km

Some stations connect to the bus network, run by the CTS.

During the COVID-19 pandemic, the tram only lost 30% of the ridership, less significant than many other transportation networks in France.

== Schedules ==
Service generally starts at the termini closest to the depot, between 0404 and 0434, picking up at the other end of the line between 0436 and 0457. In this way, stations closest to the depots (Rotonde for lines A and D, Elsau for lines B and F, Martin Schongauer for line B headed to Ostwald, Kibitzenau for line C and Landsberg for line E). On Sundays and public holidays, service starts an hour later than usual. Service ends at the same time every day; the last departures from termini take place between 0002 and 0015 (except for line C, where the last tram leaves Gare Centrale at 0035). After this, trams are stored in the depots; there is no reduced night-time service.

The service is equally frequent across all lines except line F, which has much lower frequency. All lines have an enhanced service period, from around 0600 to 2000. During this period, tram frequencies on lines A, B, C, D and E are one every 6 minutes on Mondays – Fridays, one every 7 minutes on Saturdays and every 12–15 minutes on Sundays. On line F, tram frequency is one every 10 minutes Monday – Friday, one every 13.5 minutes on Saturdays and one every 20 minutes on Sundays and public holidays.

Outside the enhanced service period, trams follow published timetables on all lines except line A. Depending on the time of day, tram frequency is one every 10–15 minutes on lines B, C, D and E. On line A, it is possible that trams run only every 20 minutes in the early mornings and late evenings, while the frequency on line F is only one every 20–30 minutes at these times. This is not problematic for users, since its purpose is to reinforce service on other lines (aside the final 600m, Observatoire – Place d'Islande).

Stations served by two different lines will have a tram stop every 3 minutes on weekdays, according to the schedules described above. On Saturdays, this gap grows to 3.5 minutes, while frequency averages one tram every 6 – 7.5 minutes on Sundays and public holidays. There are some exceptions: Elsau – Homme de Fer is served less often, since only lines B and F travel this route. On the other hand, the two sections served by three lines (Homme de Fer – République and République-Observatoire) are travelled by 26 trams every hour in each direction, Monday to Friday. The network as a whole boasts one of the highest transit frequencies of all French urban areas with over 250 000 inhabitants.

What is unique about the Strasbourg service is the fact that service at morning and evening rush hours is not more frequent than other services throughout the day. This is particularly noticeable in the early mornings, where service is reduced in most large cities; this is not the case in Strasbourg. The trams have no separate evening timetable, while bus schedules are modified only slightly. Both modes of transport have their timetables co-ordinated as to ensure transfers are always possible, even in the late evenings.

From the beginning of July to the end of August, the CTS uses a summer timetable, with slightly lower tram frequencies. Details of this are however not published, only arrival and departure times at major stations. Journey times are not identical across all services, varying by up to 3–4 minutes on line A, regardless of the time of day. Overall, the trams recorded an average service speed of 19 km/h in 2010.

== Passenger Information Systems ==
Every station has displays providing real-time passenger information: the destination of the next tram due at the station and its estimated time of arrival. Each station is linked to a central command post, and there is a PA system in the case of major disruptions.

The trams themselves are also equipped with passenger information systems. Displays show a map of the line the tram is serving, indicating the final destination and the next station. Between stations, a public address system announces the next stop, accompanied by a musical jingle unique to each station, composed by the singer-songwriter Rodolphe Burger.

== Park and Ride ==
Park and Ride stations are located near tramway stations, to encourage motorists to use the tramway and thus relieve congestion in the city centre. To facilitate this, a discounted tram ticket applicable to all occupants of a vehicle is offered at park and ride stations. The largest park and ride station, Elsau, has a capacity of 800 spaces. According to 2007 usage statistics, 562832 vehicles used the Park and Ride stations in one year (note that at this time a further Park and Ride was in use, at Aristide Briand, which has since been demolished).

Park and Ride stations of the Strasbourg tramway network
Name	Lat/Long	Number of parking spaces	Lines served	Status
Baggersee	48°32′40.8″N 7°44′08.8″E	460	A, E	Open
Ducs d'Alsace	48°35′21.2″N 7°42′57.6″E	600	A, D	Open
Elsau	48°34′06.2″N 7°43′48.1″E	800	B, F	Open (+ access to coaches and camping cars)
Hœnheim Gare	48°37′38.6″N 7°45′29.0″E	680	B	Open
Krimmeri	48°33′40.0″N 7°45′02.4″E	250	A, E	Open
Poteries	48°35′0″N 7°41′28″E	102	D	Open
Rives de l'Aar	48°35′59.0″N 7°45′14.0″E	570	B	Open
Robertsau Boecklin	48°35′53.0″N 7°46′35.6″E	150	E	Open
Rotonde	48°35′28.5″N 7°43′33.0″E	450	A, D	Open (higher parking charges)
Gare de Kehl			D	Planned (to open 2018/2019?)

== Rolling stock ==
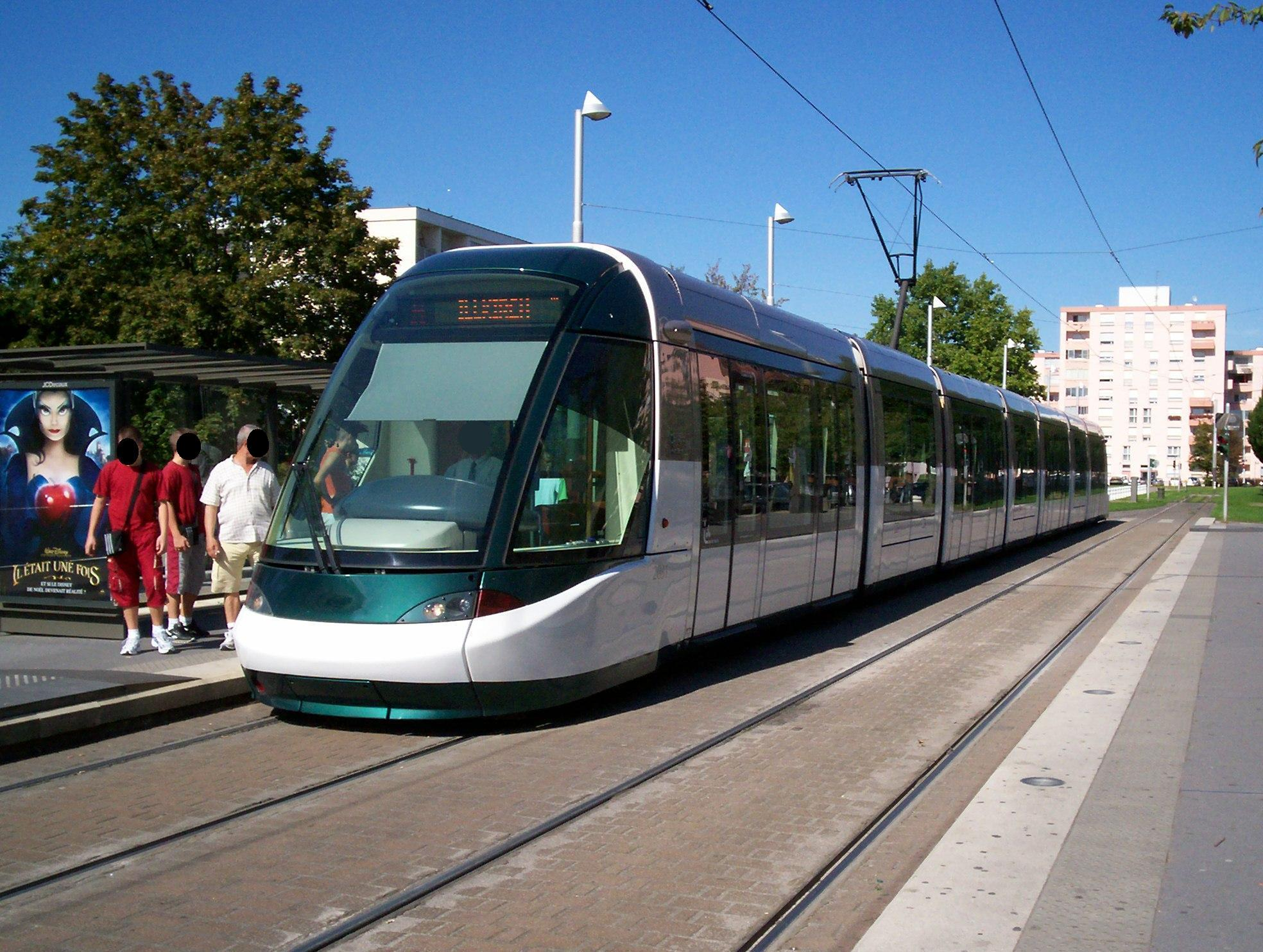
Alstom Citadis 403

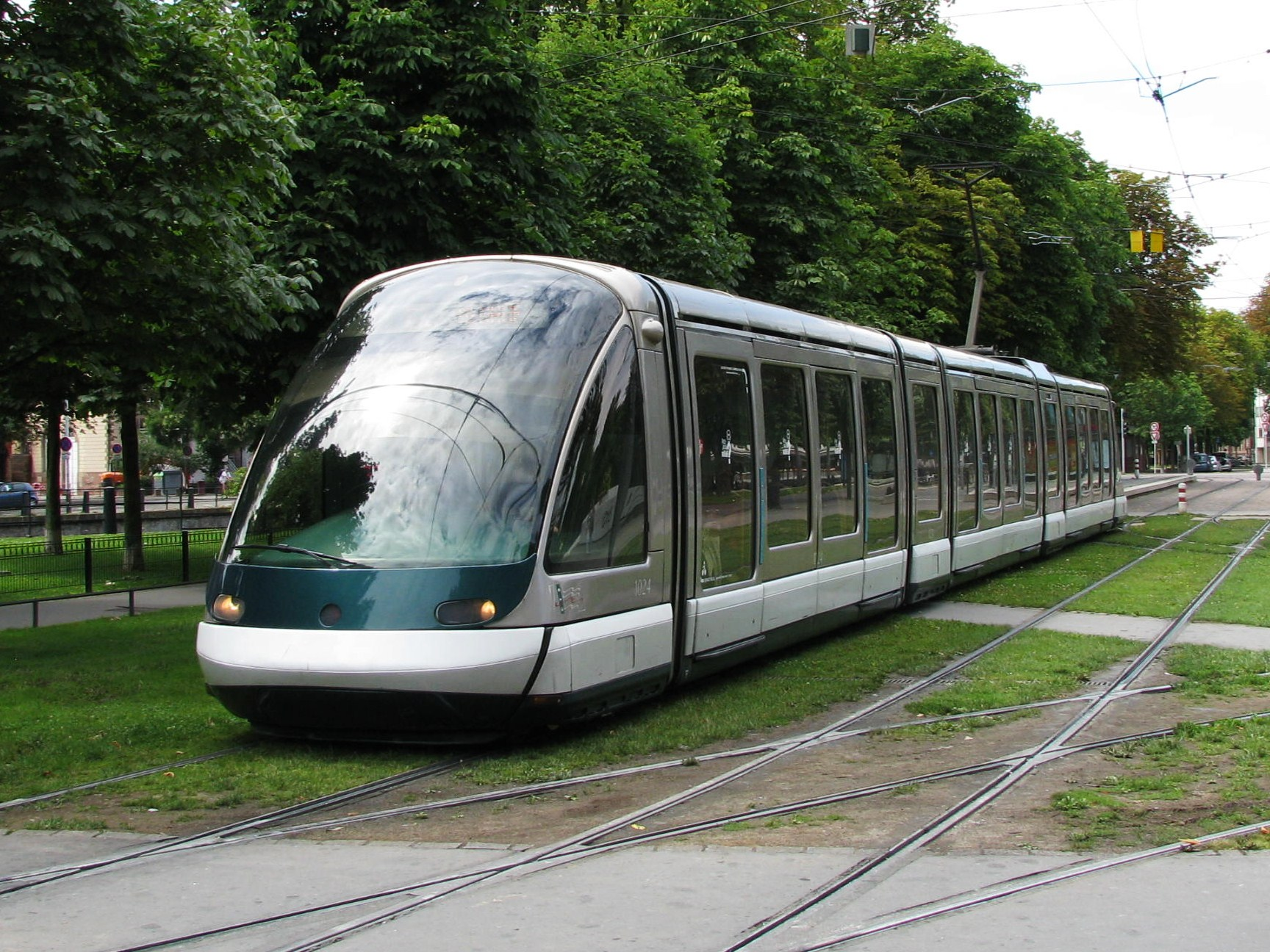
Eurotram

=== Eurotram ===
When the new network was first built in 1994, new rolling stock was designed. The city wanted fully low-floor trams with a novel design. A partnership called Eurotram was formed between CTS and Socimi, an Italian company. Stringent standards were set on ergonomics and aesthetics: the city insisted on a fully low-floor design, with wide doors and electric wheelchair ramps in order to facilitate access and cater for the elderly and the disabled. Air conditioning was installed, despite advice from the manufacturers that it was unnecessary. The curved front windscreen covers the entire front of the tram, giving it a futuristic appearance. Similarly, large windows were included on the sides of the tram, with the aim of giving passengers the impression of travelling on a 'moving pavement'. Eurotram also had a modular construction, with the head units being connected to passenger units, linked to each other by power units resting on their own axles. Another notable feature is that there is no separation between passenger cars; the inside of the tram is one continuous space.

Twenty-six Eurotrams, built by Socimi, were delivered for service on line A between 1994 and 1995. These trams are 33.1m long, have 8 axles and a maximum capacity of 210 passengers. Each tram consists of 3 passenger cars and twelve motors, developing a total of 336 kW. The CTS placed a second order, this time for twenty-seven units, which were delivered between 1998 and 2000. The order included ten 8-axle trams and seventeen 10-axle trams. These ten-axle trams, nicknamed 'jumbos', are 43.05 m long, weigh 51 t and can carry up to 270 passengers in their 4 passenger cars. Total power is 424 kW, produced by sixteen motors.

Although the Eurotram's design has generally been applauded for its user-friendliness, it has also received some criticism. For instance, the doors have been criticised for being too slow to open/close (they are single doors), lengthening the time spent in stations. Additionally, the large window over and around the driver's cabin can result in the cabin becoming too hot, a problem that was remedied with sun blinds.

=== Alstom Citadis ===
New rolling stock was required to operate on the 2005 extensions, so the city launched a call for bids in 2003 for new tram units. On 15 July 2003, Alstom was announced as the winner with its Citadis tram. Forty-one Citadis 403 trams were delivered from 2005 onwards. These units are 43.05 m long, carry 288 passengers and have ten axles. They weigh 53.2 t and are powered by three motor units, delivering a total of 720 kW.

At CTS's request, the trams were restyled to look like the Eurotrams. The axle distribution is different on the Citadis, and the Citadis has an additional bogie under the driver's cab. One of the Citadis' advantages over the Eurotram is the inclusion of double doors which allow faster opening and closure, minimising time spent in stations.

In 2014, CTS signed a framework agreement with Alstom for the supply of a further 50 Citadis trams. An initial 12 trams, worth €41 000 000, entered service by the end of 2016. The trams met BOStrab standards for operation into Germany, and are used on the cross-border line D extension to Kehl, as well as line A.

== Maintenance ==
Given the network's size and daily usage, maintenance is practically constant. Two 'Aspirail' trucks run the route daily, sucking up any debris that may be clogging the tracks. In case of an accident, the CTS has a fleet of road-rail vehicles available, including tractors, a Unimog and cherry pickers.

In periods where ridership is lower (mainly summer), more major works are regularly carried out. CTS teams and contractors renew the tracks, points, signals and stations. The most major works bring about temporary suspension of the relevant tram service and buses are made available as replacements. This happened in April 2011, when the points at Rotonde were replaced.

== Future extensions ==
A few extensions are planned:

- A single-tracked extension of line A towards the Zenith concert hall, to be used only when large concerts are held has been planned, without a fixed completion date.
- An extension of line C to Meinau was scrapped in favour of a bus rapid transit system. This will link Baggersee with Neuhof Rudolphe Reuss, with a total length of 5.2 kilometres (3.2 mi).

A new tram-train system for Strasbourg was also proposed in 2013. This would run over railway tracks from Gresswiller and Barr to the Gare Centrale, where it would connect to the CTS system using new tunnel connections under the station, continuing to destinations in central and eastern Strasbourg. However Jacques Bigot, president of the Urban Community of Strasbourg, has been quoted as saying that the proposed tram-train passing under the station "will never happen", because of the high level of expenditure needed to build the connecting tunnels. However, the project was revived at the end of 2015, with priority given to connecting the Koenigshoffen district. This will involve a new branch at the level of Faubourg National, reaching Allée des Comtes via three new stations, via line B or F. Costs for this project have been estimated at 38 million euros with a planned entry into service in 2019/2020.

A third phase of expansions involves extending line C towards Neuhof Stockfeld over 2.4 kilometres (1.5 mi). There are also plans to reduce the growing congestion at the central hubs (especially Homme de Fer) by creating new connections in the network's periphery, allowing passengers to bypass these hubs. Some of these new connections will be bus rapid transit lines, others will be tramways.

As a continuation of the planned bus rapid transit route between Meinau and Neuhof, a further route will allow the bus rapid transit network to form a ring around the city centre, connecting major sites. These two lines will involve around 12 kilometres (7.5 mi) of new routes.

After the 2026 municipal elections, the newly elected mayor Catherine Trautmann (who also was a mayor of Strasbourg at the time of the reintroduction of the tramway in the 1990s) confirmed multiple extension plans for her third term - which include: the extension of tram C towards Neuhof Stockfeld, a new version of the northern extension to Schiltigheim, and a conversion of BRT line H to the tram.

== Fares ==
The CTS has several different tickets available to satisfy different needs. There is no division of the network into pricing zones; instead, a single fare is offered, costing €2,10, allowing the holder to travel from any station to another, including transfers, regardless of distance. Tickets are not valid after the journey; they are validated at the station just before entering the tram (on bus services, tickets are stamped inside the bus). They are loaded onto a rechargeable card (badgéo), at a discount of 15% and 19% respectively. A ticket is sold for €3.90 (or €30.90 for the pack of ten) which works like regular system, but also allows travel on the TER train to Strasbourg Airport. The '24h individuel Alsa' ticket allows one person to make an unlimited number of journeys in a period of 24 hours at a cost of €4 while the '24h Trio' ticket provides the same service to three people, at a price of €5.70. These last two tickets are also valid on TER trains travelling in the Urban Community of Strasbourg and include the nearby town of Kehl. Tram tickets are sold at numerous points in the city, such as newsagents, post offices, tobacconists etc.

Monthly and yearly passes also exist, with the yearly pass costing the same as ten monthly ones. As of December 2019, the price of an annual pass for an adult (age 26–64 years) is €518; persons aged under 25 pay a price of €276, and pensioners (65 years old and over) pay €248.40. Since 2010 the CTS has offered so-called Tarification Solidaire, i.e. reduced-price monthly and yearly passes to those in low income brackets. This reduction is calculated based on the quotient familial of the subscriber. The quotient familial (page in French) is a measure used by the French administration and is roughly equal to 1/12 of a household's annual income divided by the number of fiscal members in the household for tax purposes. For subscribers with a quotient familial of less than €750 reductions are calculated on a scale from 50% reduction to 90% reduction in price of the monthly pass.

The Badgéo smart card, costing €4, allows the user to purchase any ticket or subscription from tram stations, Crédit Mutuel branches and some other approved vendors. The card is then used like a ticket, allowing the user to travel according to the ticket or subscription that has been purchased. Monthly and yearly passes can only be bought in Badgéo form, as the paper forms of these passes have been discontinued.

Strasbourg tram tickets, when bought in a pack of ten, are more expensive than the average of other French cities whose population exceeds 450,000 (excluding Paris), although they are not the most expensive. On the other hand, the price of a monthly subscription is in line with the average for large French cities.

== Financing ==
Up to the year 2000, 477 million euro had been spent building the network, and 304 million euro were earmarked in 2002 for the construction of the third phase of extensions; around 23.5 million per kilometre of track. This value is relatively high when compared to the cost of similar tracks in Germany, where 15 million euro are spent per kilometre of track in the city centre, and 10 million in suburban areas. The difference is due to the significant urban renewal projects undertaken in Strasbourg as part of the tramway's construction.

The rolling stock cost 216.3 million euro: 118 million for the Eurotram units and 98.3 million for the Citadis trams. Investment in the Strasbourg tramway is mainly financed with the versement transport (VT), a tax levied in Strasbourg at 2% of payrolls, the highest rate allowed.

In the nine French urban areas with more than 450 000 inhabitants (excluding Paris), income from ticket sales covers on average 24% of costs, while the VT contributes 44%. Local authorities cover a further 31% of costs, while the remaining 1% is a direct state subsidy. In smaller cities, ticket sales make up an even smaller proportion of total funding.

The mean cost per passenger transported in these nine urban areas is €1.3, but varies between 0.8 euro and 2 euro. This value of 1.3 euro corresponds to the price of a pack of ten tickets (€12.7). For comparison, the CTS reported mean profits of €0.5 per journey in 2009.

The overall financing of the CTS, and thus the current operation of the tramway is heavily subsidized by local authorities. In 2009, the CTS reported income of €194,194,702 and costs of €192,014,173, generating a profit of €2,180,528. The total amount of subsidies paid in 2009 by the Urban Community of Strasbourg and the Bas-Rhin Département was €120,720,000.

== See also ==
- Trams in France
- List of town tramway systems in France
