= Kehl =

- City
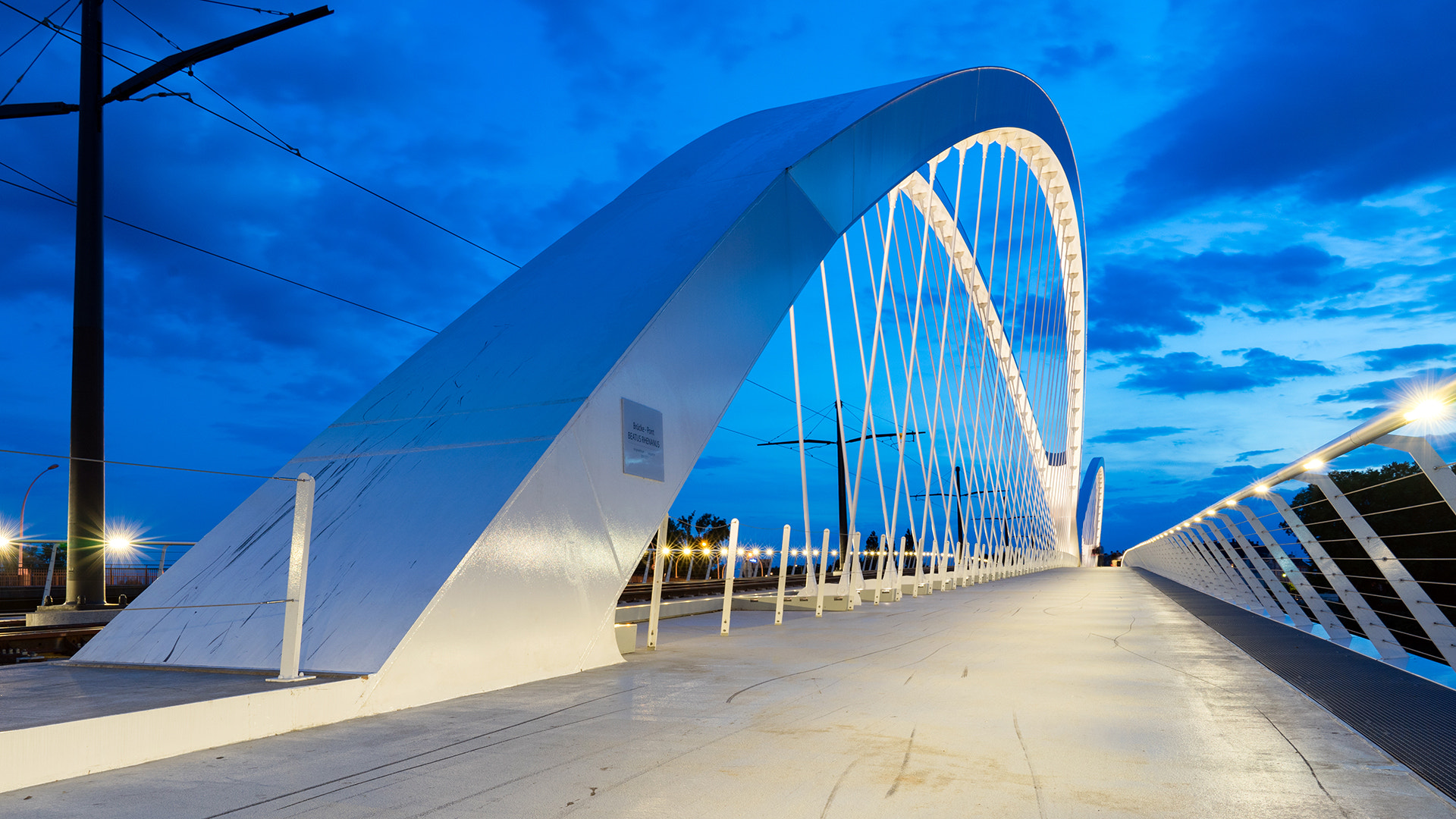
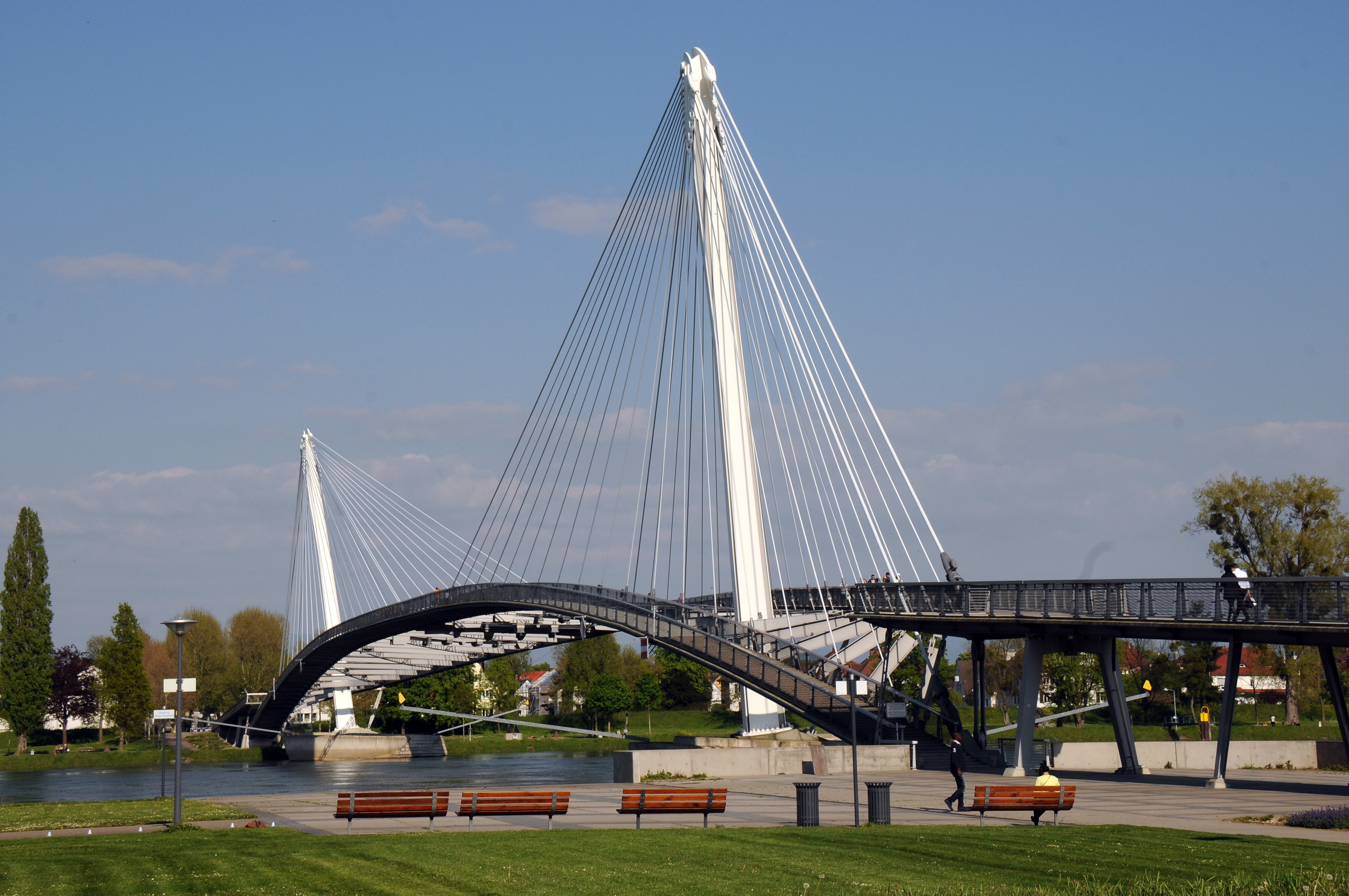
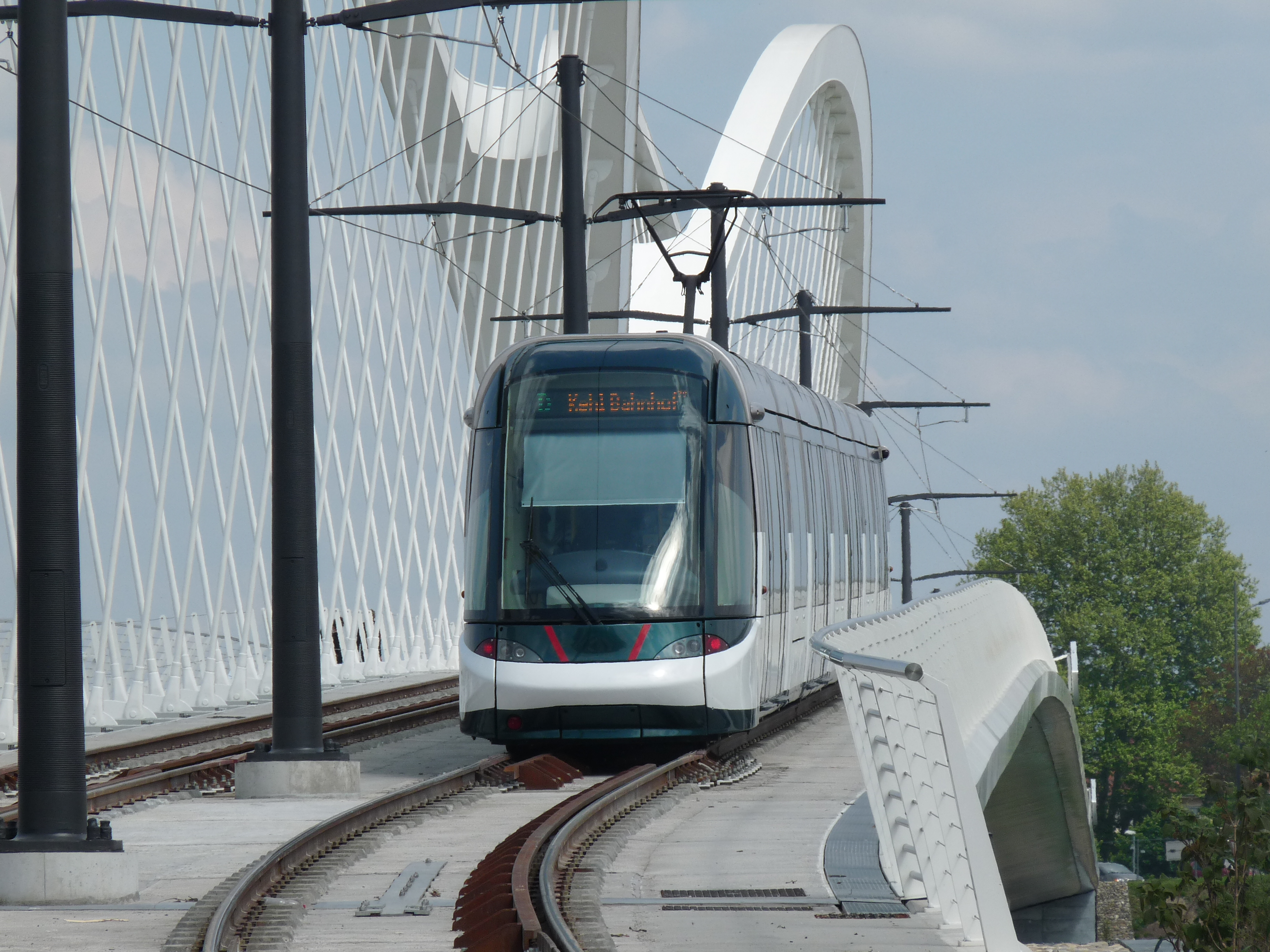
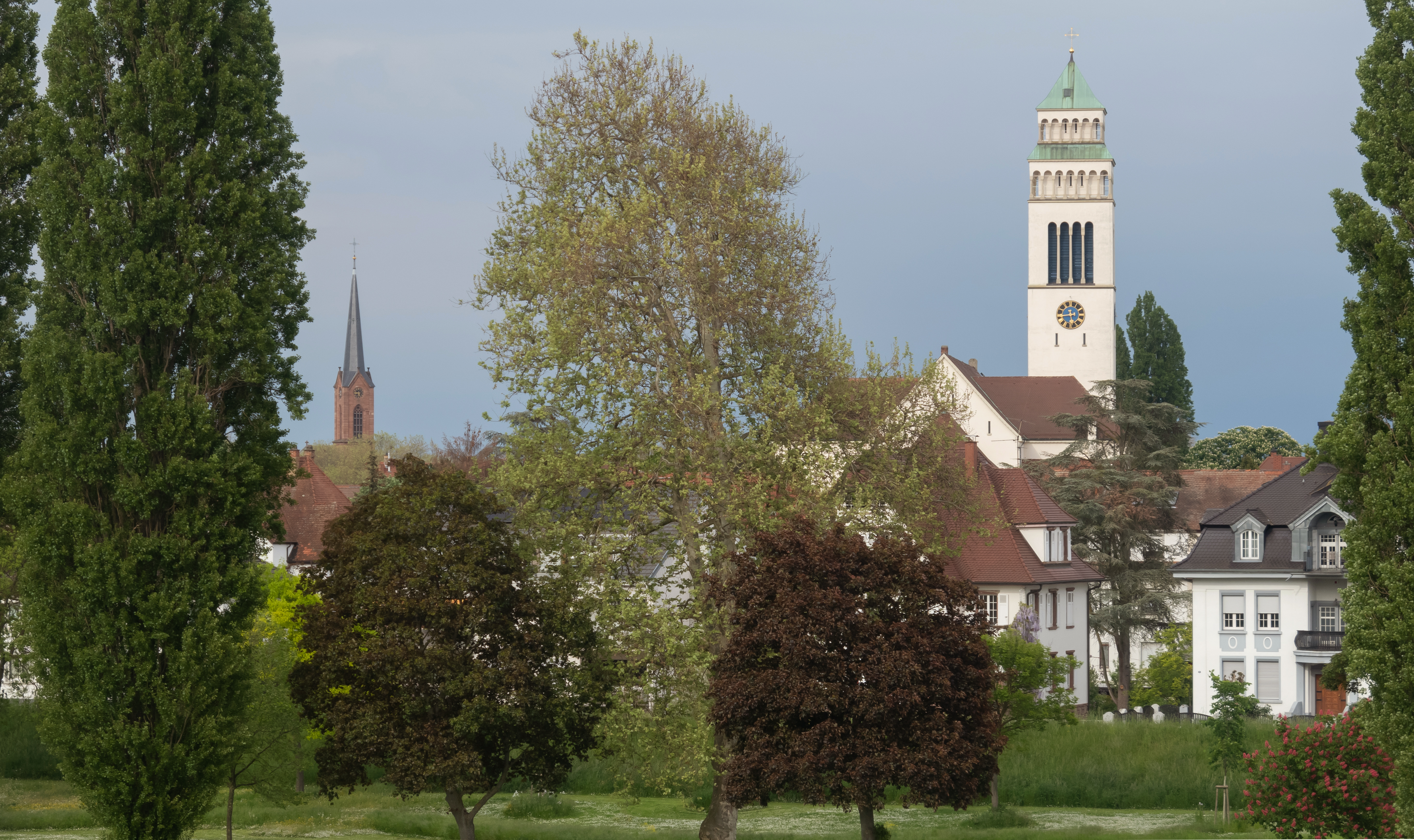
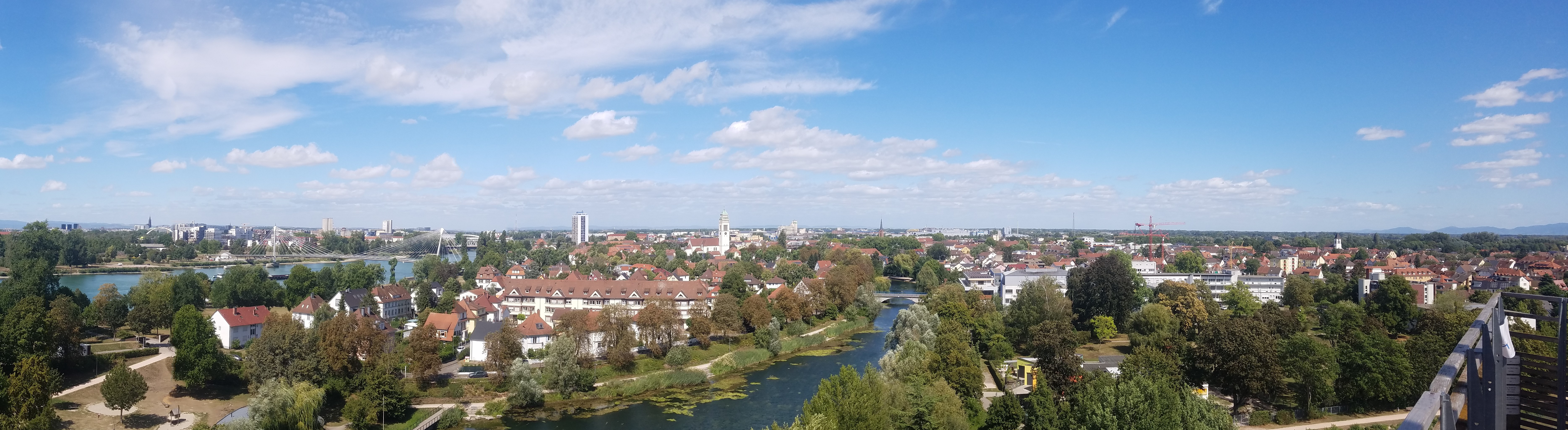
- Beatus Rhenanus Bridge Passerelle des Deux Rives Strasbourg tramway Sankt-Nepomukkirche and Friedenskirche Panorama of Kehl

- Coat of arms

- Location of Kehl within Ortenaukreis district
- Interactive map of Kehl
- Location within Germany Location within Baden-Württemberg
- Coordinates: 48°34′N 7°49′E
- Country: Germany
- State: Baden-Württemberg
- Admin. region: Freiburg
- District: Ortenaukreis

Government
  - Mayor (2022–30): Wolfram Britz (Ind.)

Area
  - Total: 75.07 km^{2} (28.98 sq mi)
- Elevation: 139 m (456 ft)

Population (2025-12-31)
  - Total: 39,708
  - Density: 528.9/km^{2} (1,370/sq mi)
- Time zone: UTC+01:00 (CET)
  - Summer (DST): UTC+02:00 (CEST)
- Postal codes: 77671-77694
- Dialling codes: 07851
- Vehicle registration: OG, BH, KEL, LR, WOL
- Website: www.kehl.de

Kehl (German pronunciation: [keːl]; Low Alemannic: Kaal) is a city with around 38,000 inhabitants in the southwestern German state of Baden-Württemberg. It lies in the region of Baden on the Rhine River, at the confluence with the smaller Kinzig River, directly opposite the French and Alsatian city of Strasbourg. It is the third-largest city of the Ortenaukreis (Ortenau District) after Offenburg and Lahr/Schwarzwald.

Kehl is mostly known because of its proximity to Strasbourg and as a border city. Strasbourg and Kehl are connected by four Rhine bridges which are from south to north: the Passerelle des Deux Rives (pedestrians and cyclists), the Bridge of Europe (motorists, pedestrians and cyclists), the Beatus-Rhenanus Bridge (tramway, pedestrians and cyclists), and the Rhine Bridge (railway).

Line D of the Strasbourg tramway was extended in 2017 to reach Kehl station, and since 2018 there are another two stations within Kehl. It is therefore possible to directly reach the city centre of Strasbourg (stations Homme de Fer and Langstross Grand'Rue) as well as Strasbourg Main Station (station Gare Centrale) by tramway without having to change.

The Jardin des Deux Rives/Garten der zwei Ufer extends on both sides of the Rhine, connected by the Passerelle des Deux Rives. Strasbourg and Kehl further share some municipal services. Kehl has a large port on the Rhine, the Häfen Kehl (Kehl Ports), south of the mouth of the Kinzig, and is the seat of the Kehl University of Applied Sciences (Hochschule Kehl).

== History ==
The village of Kehl was first mentioned in 1038. In 1338, the first permanent bridge between Kehl and Strasbourg was completed. In 1678, the city was taken over by France, as it was considered to be part of the defense system of Strasbourg. Hence the village was transformed into a fortress in 1683 by the French architect Vauban.

In 1681, the Imperial City of Strasbourg, a territory of the Holy Roman Empire that included Kehl, was annexed by Louis XIV, King of France. This annexation was recognized by the Treaty of Ryswick in 1697, but all right-bank territories were restored to the Empire, leading to Kehl's cession to the Margraviate of Baden the following year.

On 7 May 1770, Marie Antoinette was officially handed over by Austria to France on an island on the Rhine near Kehl. This island, which was uninhabited at the time but turned into a middle class settlement until the First World War, became known as Kommissionsinsel after the commission that received Marie Antoinette.

In 1774, Kehl received town rights by the Charles Frederick, Margrave of Baden. The village was badly damaged during the French Revolutionary Wars, especially during the Rhine Campaign of 1796, during the first and second battles of Kehl, and it was besieged by the Austrians in late 1796 until its surrender on 9 January 1797. During the First French Empire, Kehl was reunited with Strasbourg under the French First Republic, before being restored to Baden (now raised to an Electorate) in 1803. After briefly being subject to Austria, the city was returned to Baden (now a Grand Duchy) in 1815 and the fortress was dismantled.

Between 1842 and 1847, the first port facility was created by the Baden State Railway Administration. In 1861, the first railway bridge was built and the first direct connection from Paris to Vienna was established, with locomotives being changed over in Kehl.

After the First World War, under article 65 of the Treaty of Versailles the harbor of Kehl was placed under French administration for seven years to prevent possible German attacks on the opposite newly French town of Strasbourg.

During World War II Kehl was located in the so-called "Red Zone" on the western wall, which was cleared when the war broke out: in the night from 3 to 4 September 1939, the population was evacuated to the Black Forest by special trains and was only allowed to return after German troops occupied France.

On 10 November 1938, the Jewish synagogue of Kehl was broken into by Kehl supporters of the SS and members of the Gestapo and all ritual objects were destroyed. All Jewish men from Kehl and the surrounding area were taken to the city hall, abused and then deported to the Dachau. After this night, the Jewish community had to sell the synagogue to the city, after which it was demolished in 1939.

Kehl then became a suburb of Strasbourg. This status was retained even after the war. Kehl was released in accordance with the Washington Agreement on the Clearance of the City of Kehl by France from 8 April 1949, in 42 partial releases from 29 July 1949 to 8 April 1953. At that time (1945 to 1953) Sondheim was an independent municipality, which was then reunited with the city of Kehl. The city and the entire district of Kehl then belonged to the administrative district of South Baden within Baden-Württemberg.

== Religion ==
Until 1519, Kehl was part of the diocese of Strasbourg. Then, the village had to change religion at the order of the margraves and the first Lutheran minister took office. During the French occupation of the 1690s, Kehl became Roman Catholic again, only to revert to Lutheranism after being ceded back to the margrave of Baden.

From the early 19th century up to 1914, Lutherans and Catholics shared one church building; then, as the first building on the Kommissionsinsel the Catholic Church of St. Johann Nepomuk was erected.

Several free churches are situated in Kehl, including Mennonites and the New Apostolic Church.

== Demographics ==
Population development:

Year	Inhabitants
2012	33,991
2013	34,077
2014	34,513
2015	35,032
2016	35,391
2017	36,089
2018	36,089
2019	36,664
2020	36,947
2021	37,378
2022	38,154

== Gateway to Strasbourg ==
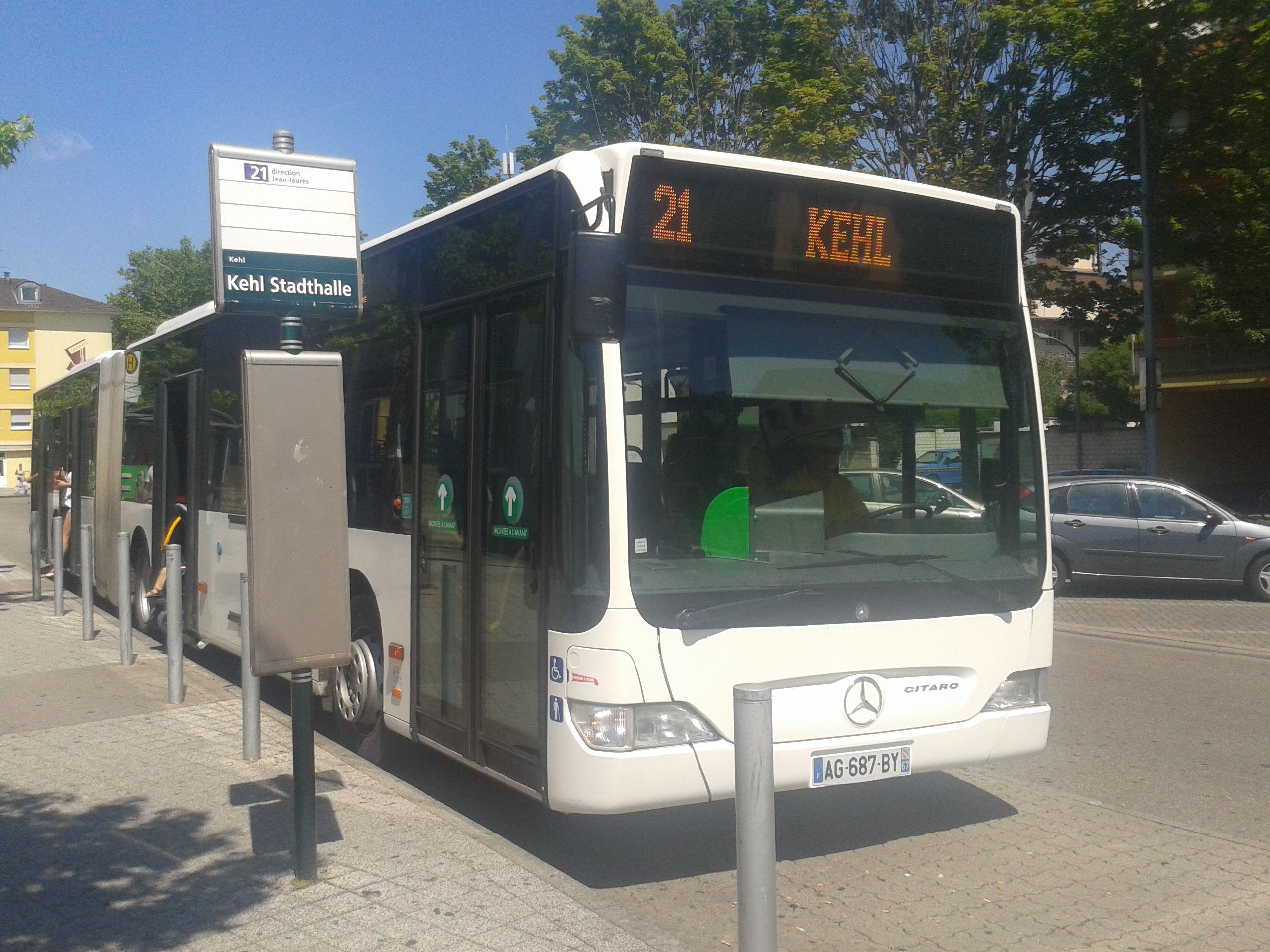
French bus awaits departure at Kehl's Stadthalle

The city of Strasbourg lies opposite Kehl over the river Rhine and the two share some municipal services. Kehl station is located near the Europabrücke (Europe Bridge), which can be crossed on foot to enter Strasbourg. Bus line 21 used to connect Kehl with the nearest tram stations across the Rhine in Strasbourg, but Strasbourg tramway line D has since been extended to Kehl. It opened on 28 April 2017 to Kehl station, and to Kehl town centre in November 2018.

== Twin towns – sister cities ==
Kehl is twinned with:

- Montmorency, France

== Notable people ==
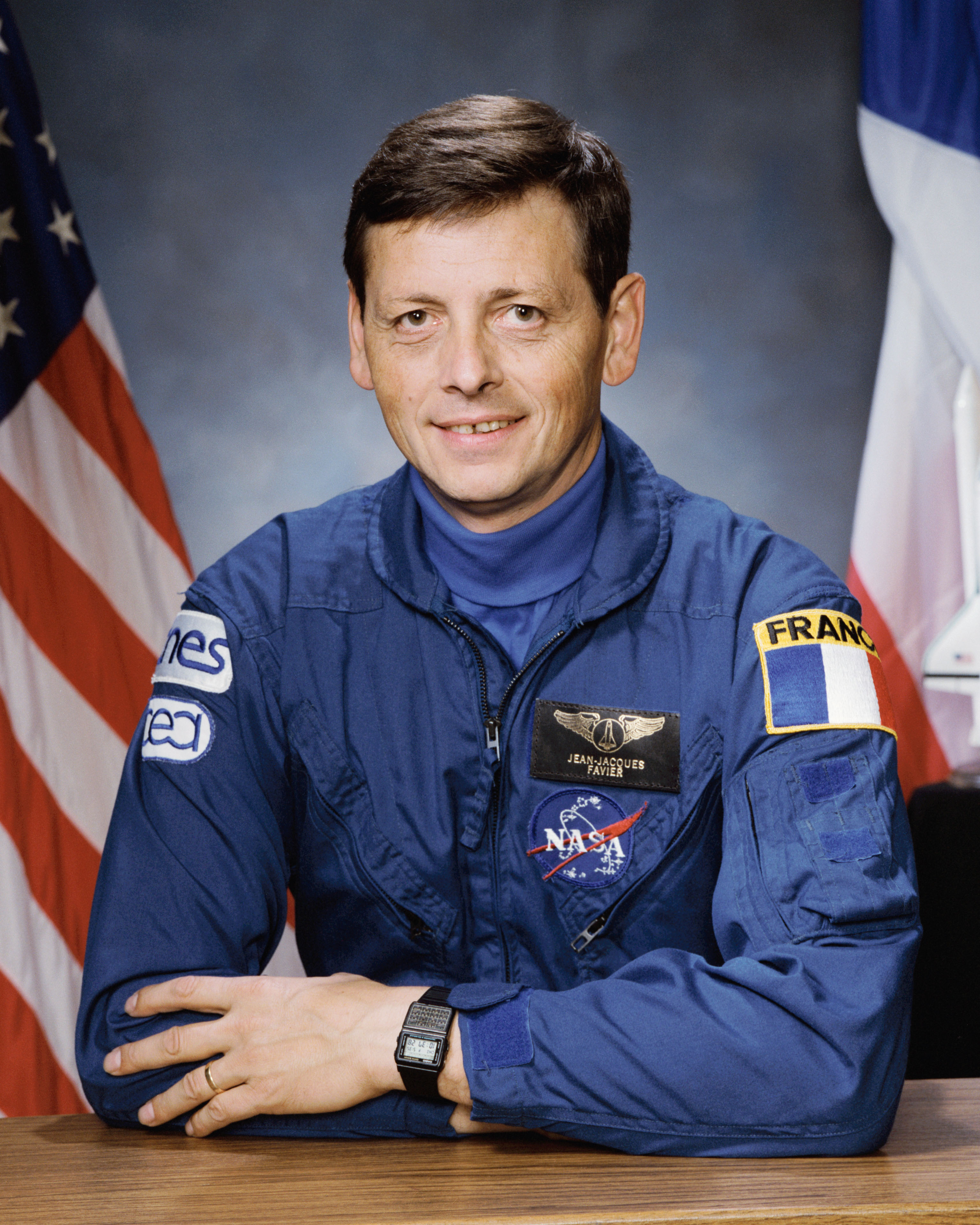
Jean-Jacques Favier, 1993

- Michele Deconet (1713–1799), violinist and string instrument maker.
- Georg Ludwig Kobelt (1804–1857), a German anatomist, he studied sexual anatomy
- Julius Bloch (1888–1966), emigrated to Philadelphia in 1893, social realist painter
- Jean-Jacques Favier (1949–2023), astronaut, flew on the NASA Space Shuttle mission in 1996.

=== Sport ===
- Georg Nückles (born 1948), retired athlete, 400m. sprinter
- Dieter Eckstein (born 1964), former footballer, played over 380 games
- Rainer Schütterle (born 1966), retired footballer, played 420 games
