= Appenweier–Strasbourg railway =

Franco-German railway line

Appenweier–Strasbourg
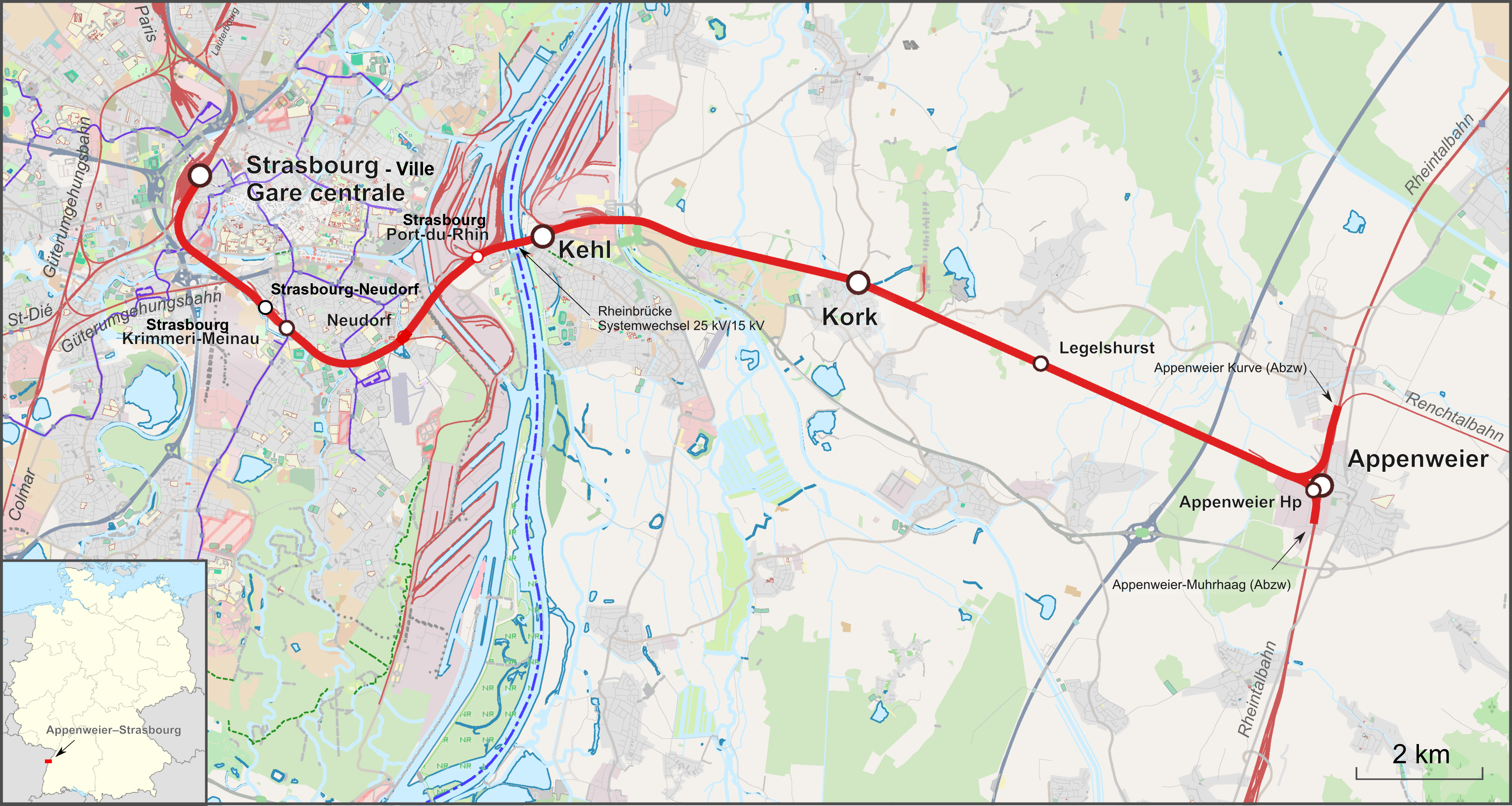

Overview
- Line number: 4260 (Appenweier-Murhaag–Kehl border)
- Locale: Baden-Württemberg, Germany; Alsace, France

Service
- Route number: 719

Technical
- Line length: 22 km (13.7 mi)
- Track gauge: 1,435 mm (4 ft 8 1/2 in)
- Electrification: (D) 15 kV, 16 2/3 Hz ~ (F) 25 kV 50 Hz AC
- Operating speed: 140 km/h (87 mph) max.

The Appenweier–Strasbourg railway is a major railway line linking the French TGV station at Strasbourg with the German Rhine Valley Railway (Rheintalbahn) and the Karlsruhe–Basel high-speed railway (between Offenburg and Baden-Baden stations). It is almost entirely double-tracked and fully electrified. The section between Kehl and Appenweier is undergoing modernisation with the goal of a maximum speed of 200 km/h. The French section is owned by SNCF; the German section is owned by Deutsche Bahn.

There are plans to equip the line with the European Train Control System (ETCS).
