= Socimi Eurotram =

Electric light rail vehicles

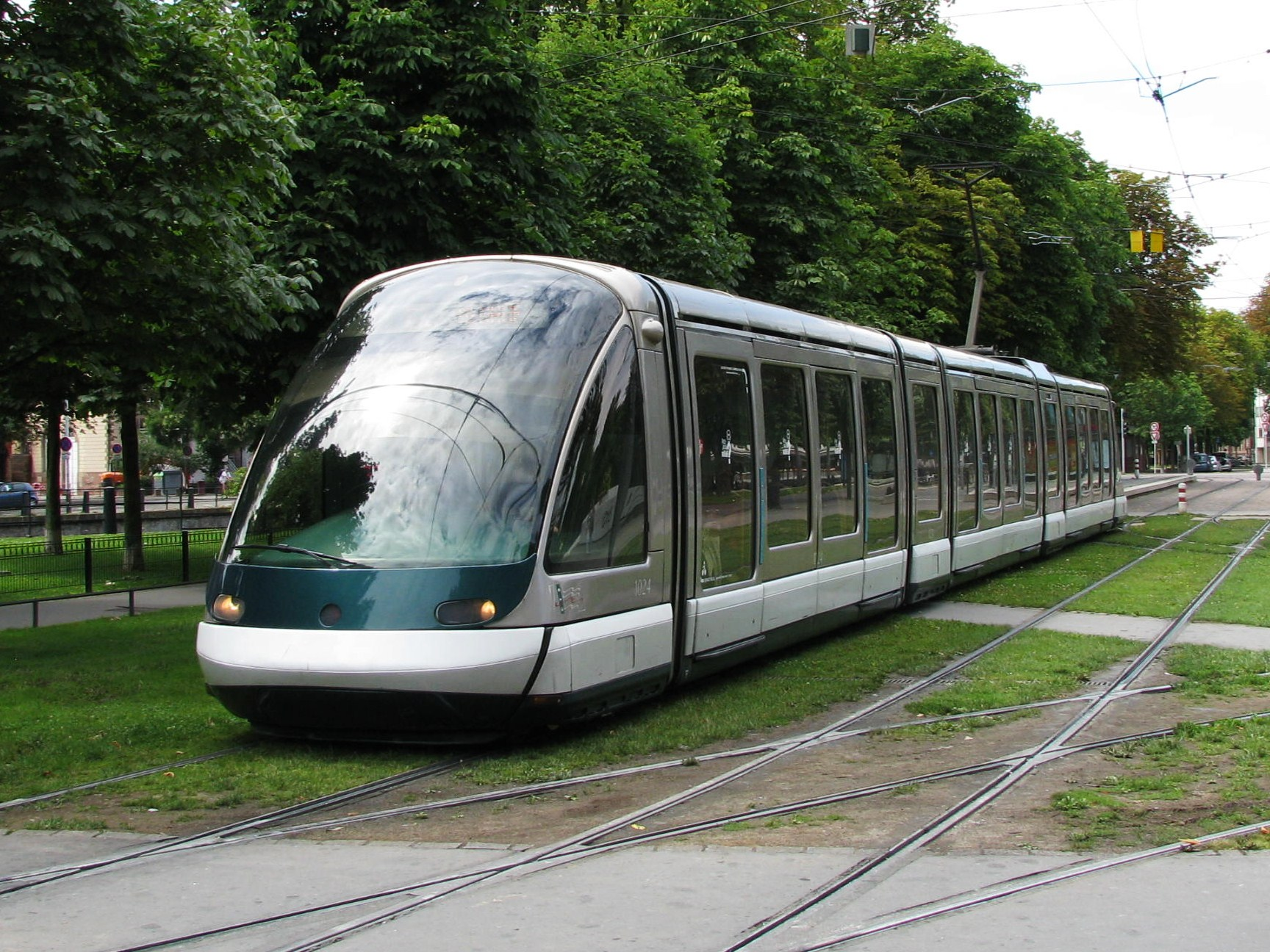
- Eurotram in Strasbourg
Type and origin
- Builder: Socimi/ABB/ADtranz/Bombardier
- Build date: 1994-
- Total produced: 36 / 17 / 26 / 72
Specifications
- Configuration
  - UIC: Bo+Bo+Bo+2 / Bo+Bo+Bo+2+Bo
- Length: 33.100 / 43.050 / 34,100 / 34,100 m
- Width: 2.4 m
- Height: 3.0 m
- Empty weight: 40.000 / 50.800 kg
Performance figures
- Maximum speed: 70 km/h

The Socimi Eurotram (later sold as the Bombardier Flexity Outlook (E)) is an electric tramcar originally designed for the tram system of Compagnie de Transports Strasbourgeois (CTS). Initially produced by Socimi, after the company became bankrupt Eurotrams were manufactured first by ABB Group's transportation division, then by Adtranz and finally by Bombardier Transportation, who marketed the tram as part of their Flexity Outlook range.

Eurotrams have been used on the Strasbourg tramway (France), the Azienda Trasporti Milanesi (Italy), and on the Porto Metro (Portugal).

== History and design ==
The Eurotram light rail vehicles was originally designed for the Compagnie des Transports Strasbourgeois (CTS) specifically for use on the Strasbourg tramway; design requirements included a 100% low floor design, airconditioning, and a higher than usual power to weight ratio for the 8% gradients in the tunnel under Strasbourg's main station. The appearance was stylised by Belgian designer Philippe Neerman.

Tenders for manufacture of the tram led to contracts with ABB Group and Socimi (Milan, Italy); Socimi subsequently went bankrupt and ABB completed production alone, on the basis of Socimi's prototypes; the trams were manufactured at ABB's York Carriage Works and Derby Litchurch Lane Works in England, with some parts from ABB Trazione (Italy).

The tram design was modular, consisting 2.575-metre (8 ft 5 3/8 in) cabs, 7.550-metre (24 ft 9 1/4 in) passenger units, and 2.350-metre (7 ft 8 1/2 in) articulation sections. The initial Strasbourg vehicles used seven modules: two cabs, three passenger units and two articulation sections, for a train length of 33.1 metres (108 ft 7 1/8 in) Each train has a mixture of powered and unpowered bogies; the bogie design used independently rotating wheels, each on a stub axle, the primary suspension was of the radial arm type, and the secondary suspension air spring type. Each wheel of a powered bogie was separately powered by bogie mounted three phase asynchronous motors, connected via a gearbox, with the wheel and motor axes of rotation parallel.

The maximum capacity of the Strasbourg seven module trams was 285 with 66 seated, the nine-module trams had an increased capacity of 370 passengers, with 92 seated. Total installed traction power was 324 and 416 kilowatts (434 and 558 hp) for the seven and nine module trams.

After the acquisition of Adtranz (ABB transportation group's successor) by Bombardier the design was marketed as part of the Flexity Outlook family.

The Eurotram design was planned to be used on the Nottingham Express Transit system which was under development in 1998. However safety regulations relating to door closing, coupled with the relatively slow motion of the Eurotram's single leaf door meant that the tram would be delayed at stops; an alternative design was chosen, the double leaf doored Incentro tram.

In December 2002, Porto tram number 018 was taken to Australia, five sections being placed on static display outside Customs House, Sydney for two weeks before being taken to Melbourne where it operated on the local tram network until March 2003 as a seven section tram.

== Orders ==
Twenty-six 33.1m (7 module) Eurotrams were delivered to (Strasbourg tramway) CTS for service on Strasbourg's line A between 1994 and 1995. CTS placed a second order in 1996 for twenty-seven units, nine of which were 7 module trains, and eighteen were 9 module trains.

The Milan tram system (Azienda Trasporti Milanesi) acquired 20 units from Adtranz.

72 units were built for the Porto tram network (Porto Metro) were constructed from 2001 at Bombardier's factory in Amadora Portugal. (see Sorefame.)

Over 150 units were built between 1994 and 2004.

City	Network	Number	Unit-Numbers	Built by	UnitType	Year built	Other
Strasbourg, France	Tramway de Strasbourg	26; 10; 17	1001–1026; 1031–1040; 1051–1067	ABB; Adtranz; Adtranz	8-axled 8-axled 10-axled	1994–1995; 1998–1999; 1999–2000	
Milano, Italy	Milano Tram	26	7001–7026	Adtranz	8-axled	1999–2000	Unidirectional
Porto, Portugal	Metro do Porto	72	MP-001–MP-072	Bombardier	8-axled	2001–2006	Units can be coupled

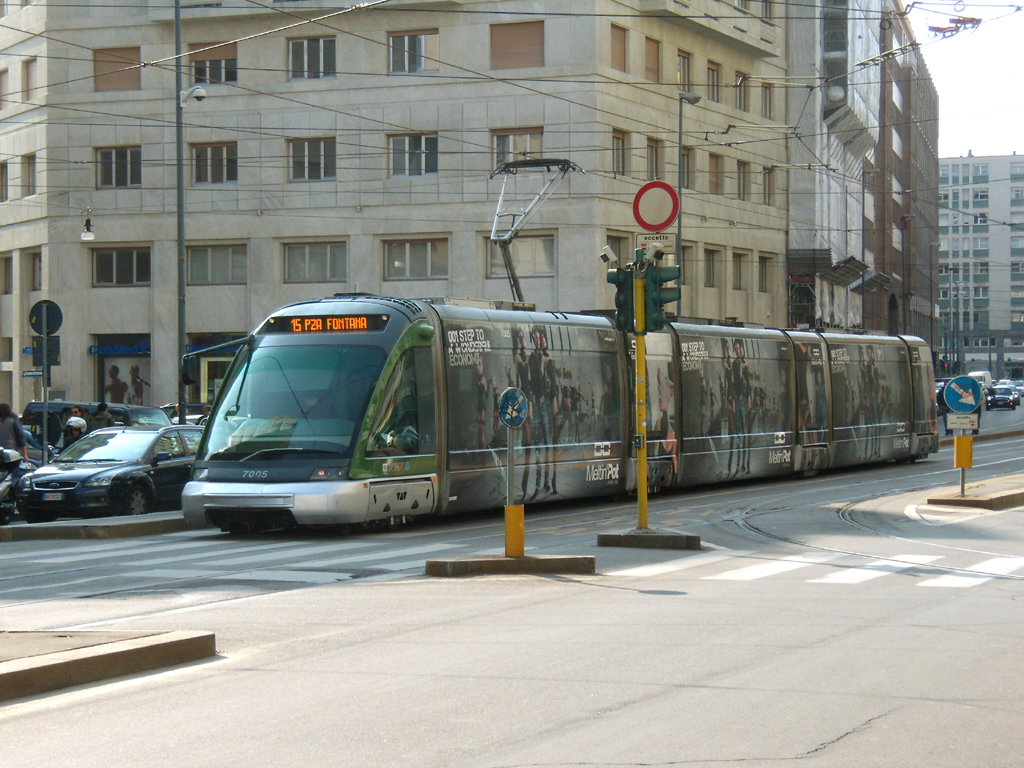
ATM 7005, Milan (2009)

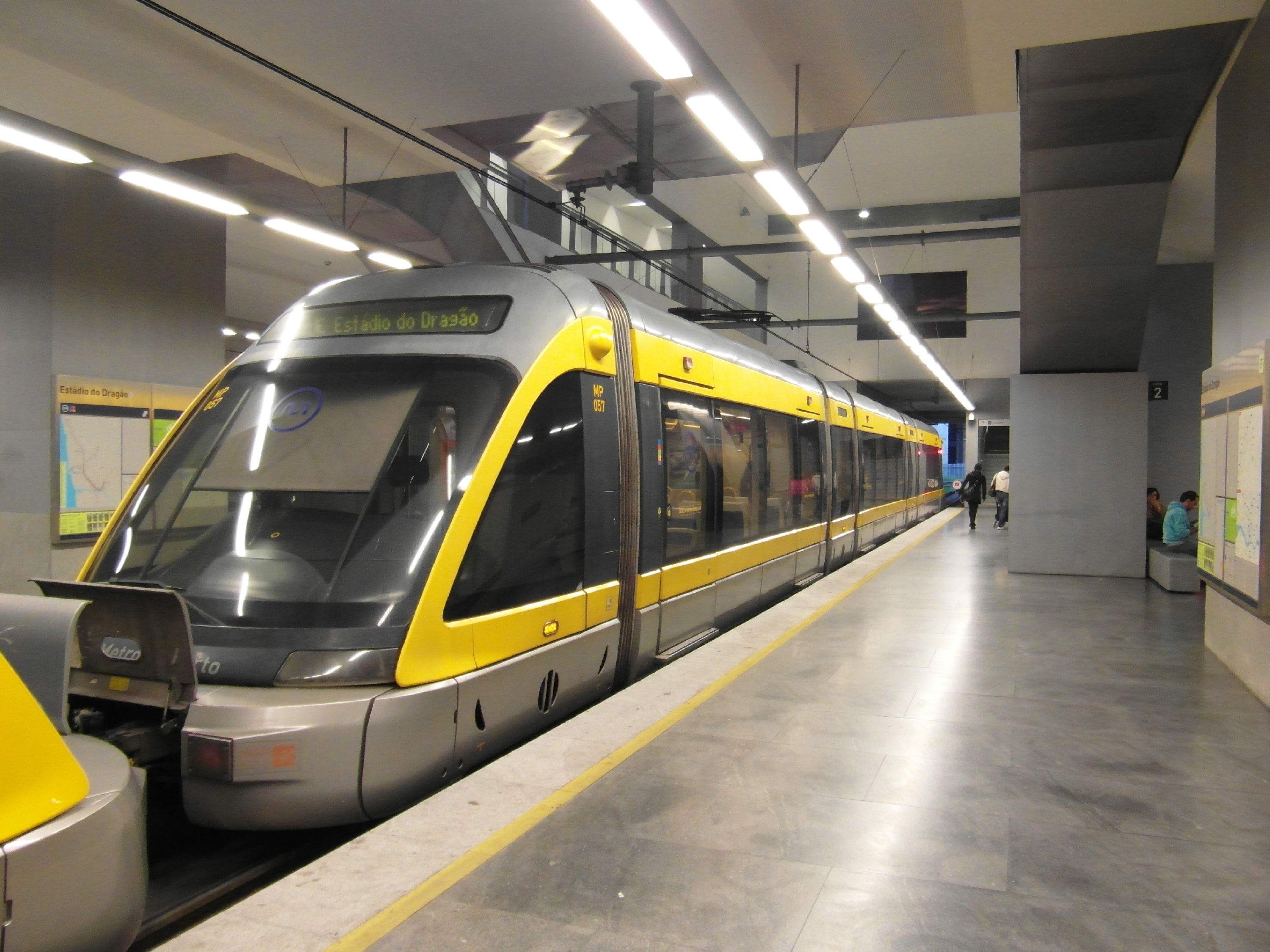
Porto Eurotram (2012)

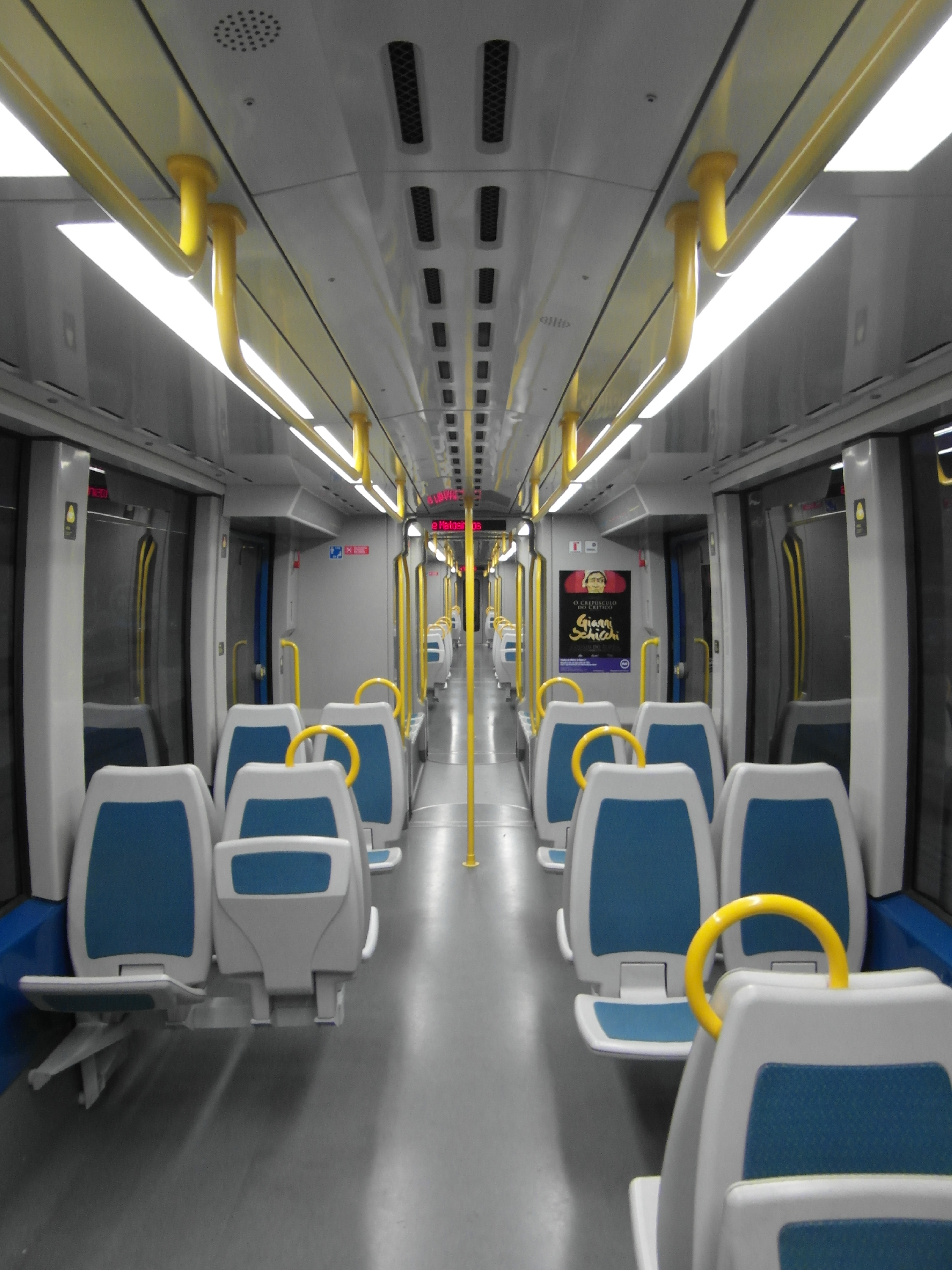
Porto Eurotram interior (2012)

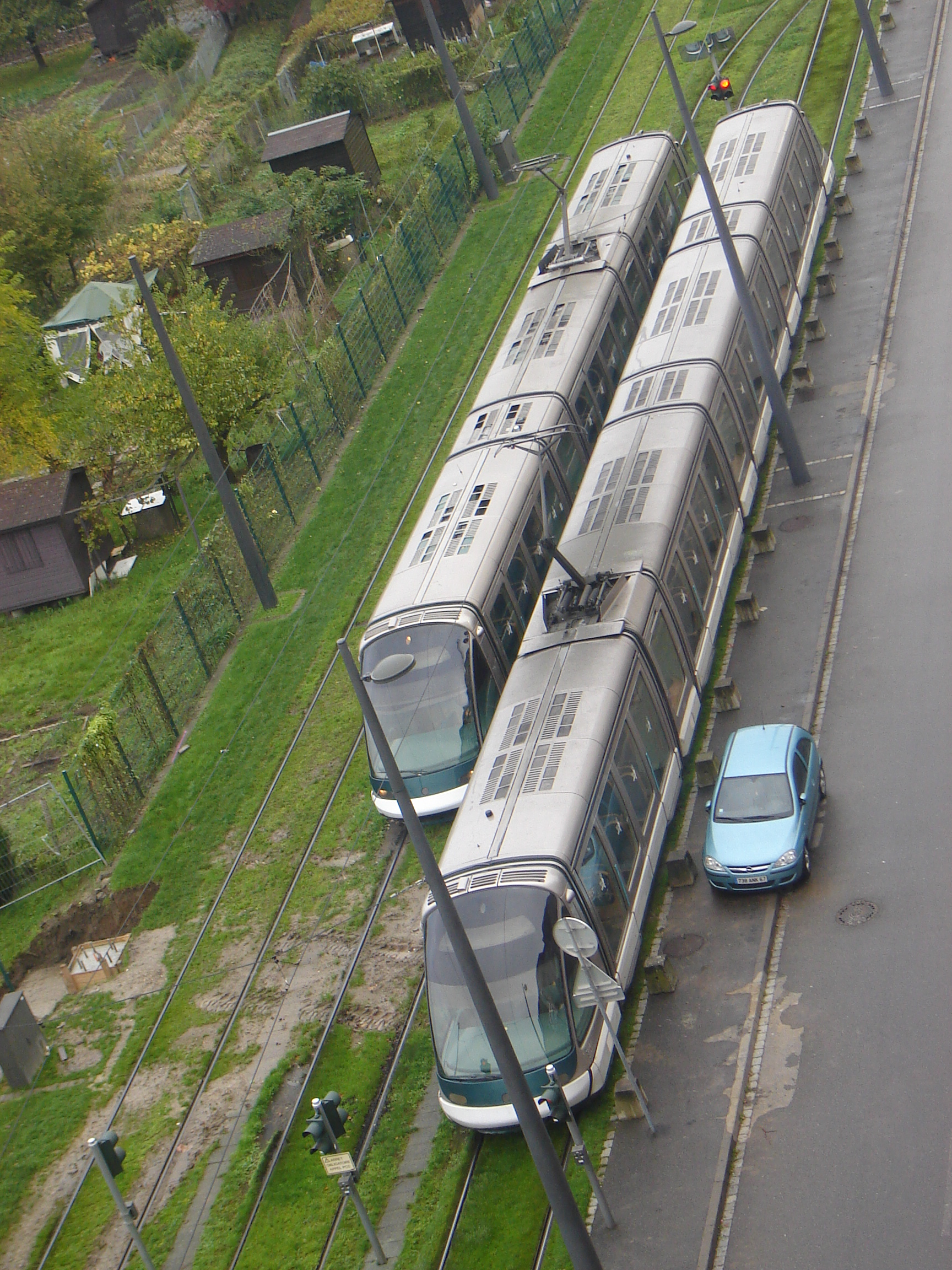
33m and 43m Strasbourg Eurotrams (2006)

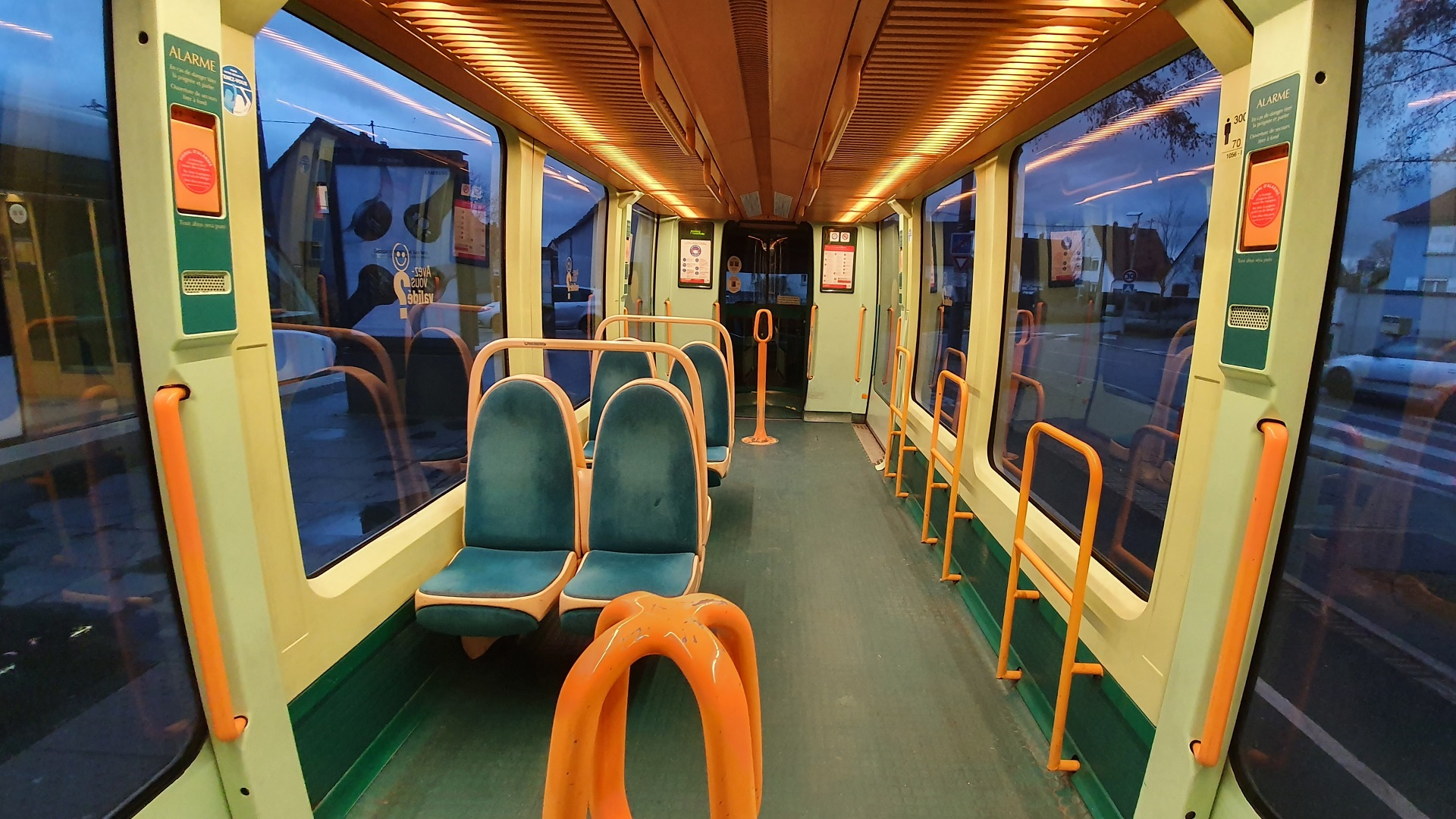
Interior of a Eurotram in Strasbourg, in a non-refurbished version

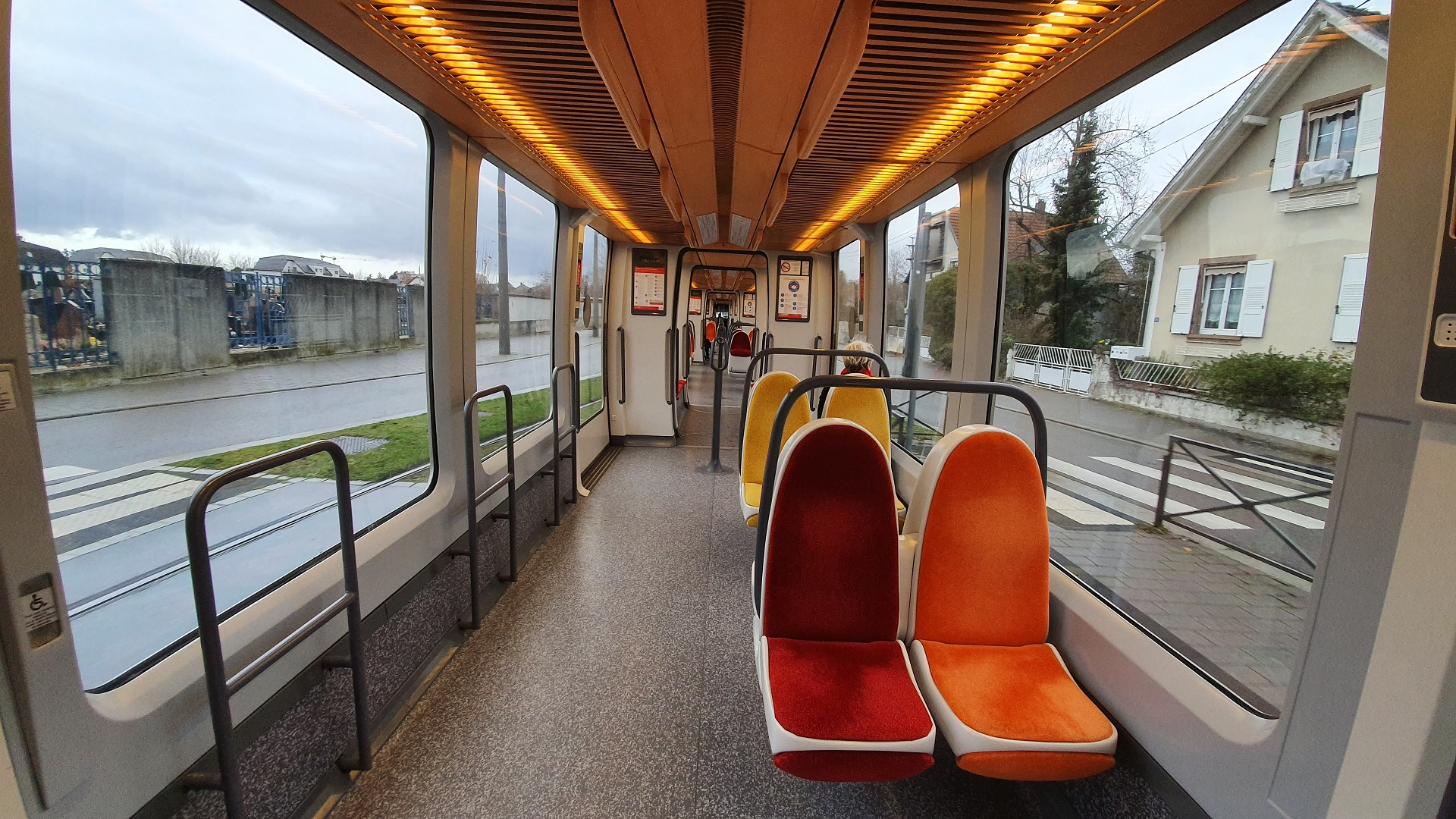
Interior of a Eurotram in Strasbourg, after their refurbishment in 2019
