= Compagnie des Transports Strasbourgeois =

Public transit authority in France

- Type: Private
- Industry: Public transport
- Founded: 1877
- Headquarters: Strasbourg, Grand Est
- Key people: Emmanuel Auneau; Managing Director
- Number of employees: 1,450 (2011)
- Website: www.cts-strasbourg.fr

The Compagnie des Transports Strasbourgeois (CTS, English: Strasbourg Transport Company) is the company responsible for the comprehensive public transport network of the Eurométropole de Strasbourg, the urban community of the French city of Strasbourg.

The CTS currently operates all six lines of the Tramway de Strasbourg and the bus network with the eight associated Park and Ride facilities, on behalf of the Eurométropole de Strasbourg. It also runs other services through its subsidiary Compagnie des Transports du Bas-Rhin (CTBR) and on behalf of the Conseil départemental du Bas-Rhin. These comprise 27 coach lines, of which 9 serve Strasbourg and participate in the Vélhop cycle network.

== History ==
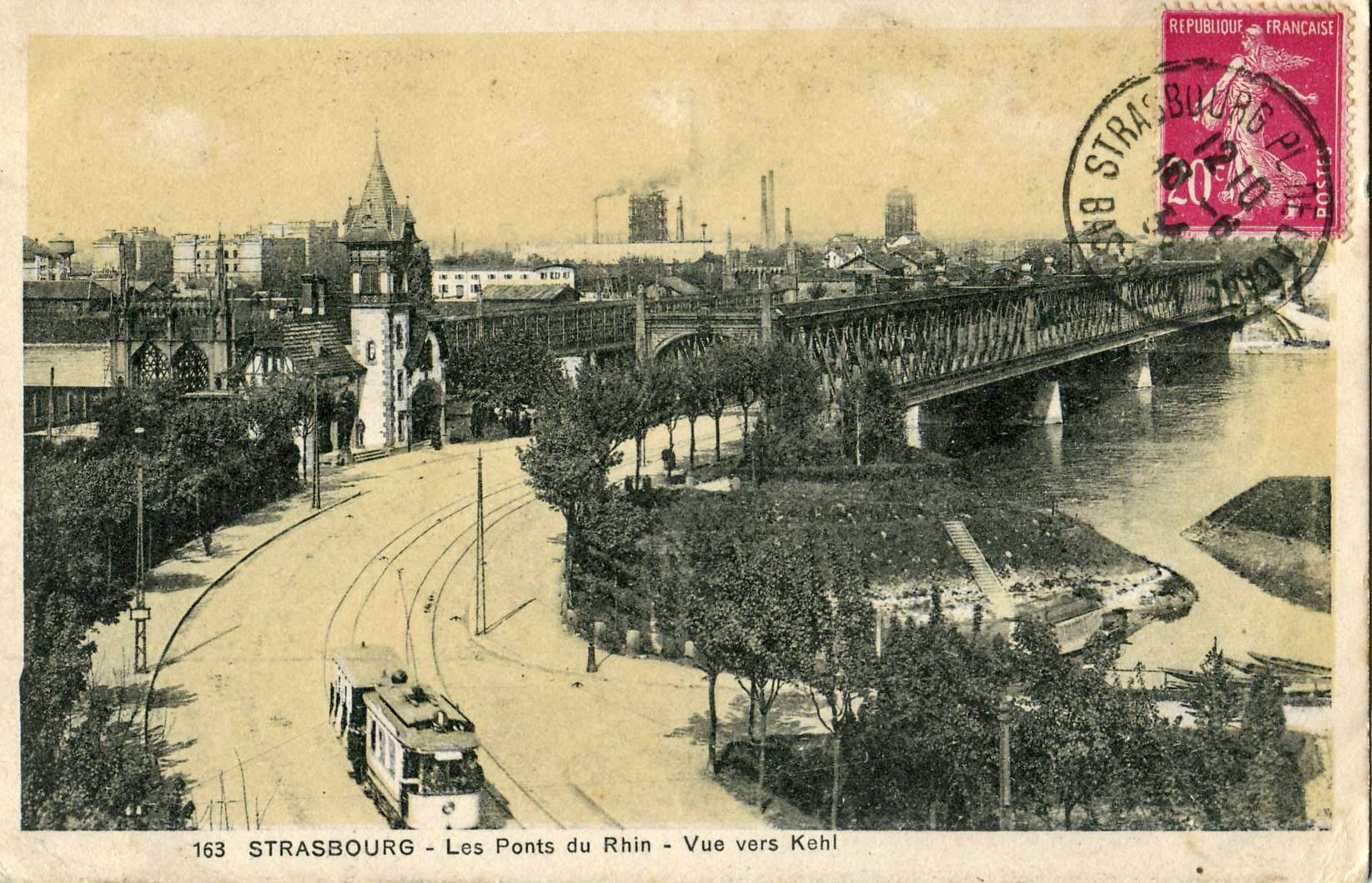
CTS tram on Line 1 crosses the Rhine, early 1920s

=== Establishment ===
In 1877, the Strassburger Pferde-Eisenbahn Gesellschaft ("Strasbourg Horse Railway Company") was established. The business did not take a French name until 1884, as the Companie des Tramways Strasbourgeois (Strasbourg Tramway Company, CTS).

On 22 July 1878 the company opened its first carriage line. It continued to expand its network, with financial support from banks such as the Straehling-Valentin bank, and also the development of a local interest in the activity of the railway.

Electrification of the tram network did not start until 1894, in partnership with the town and AEG. The first lines were electrified the following year at the 1895 Exposition Industrielle.

In 1900, the network ran almost fifteen lines over 50 km (31 mi) of route. In 1912 the city of Strasbourg became the major shareholder of the company with 51% ownership. It was the start of its status as a public-private partnership. The city also granted an exclusive contract to run the network and construct any future lines., which gave the city power to control Strasbourg's development.

=== World War I ===
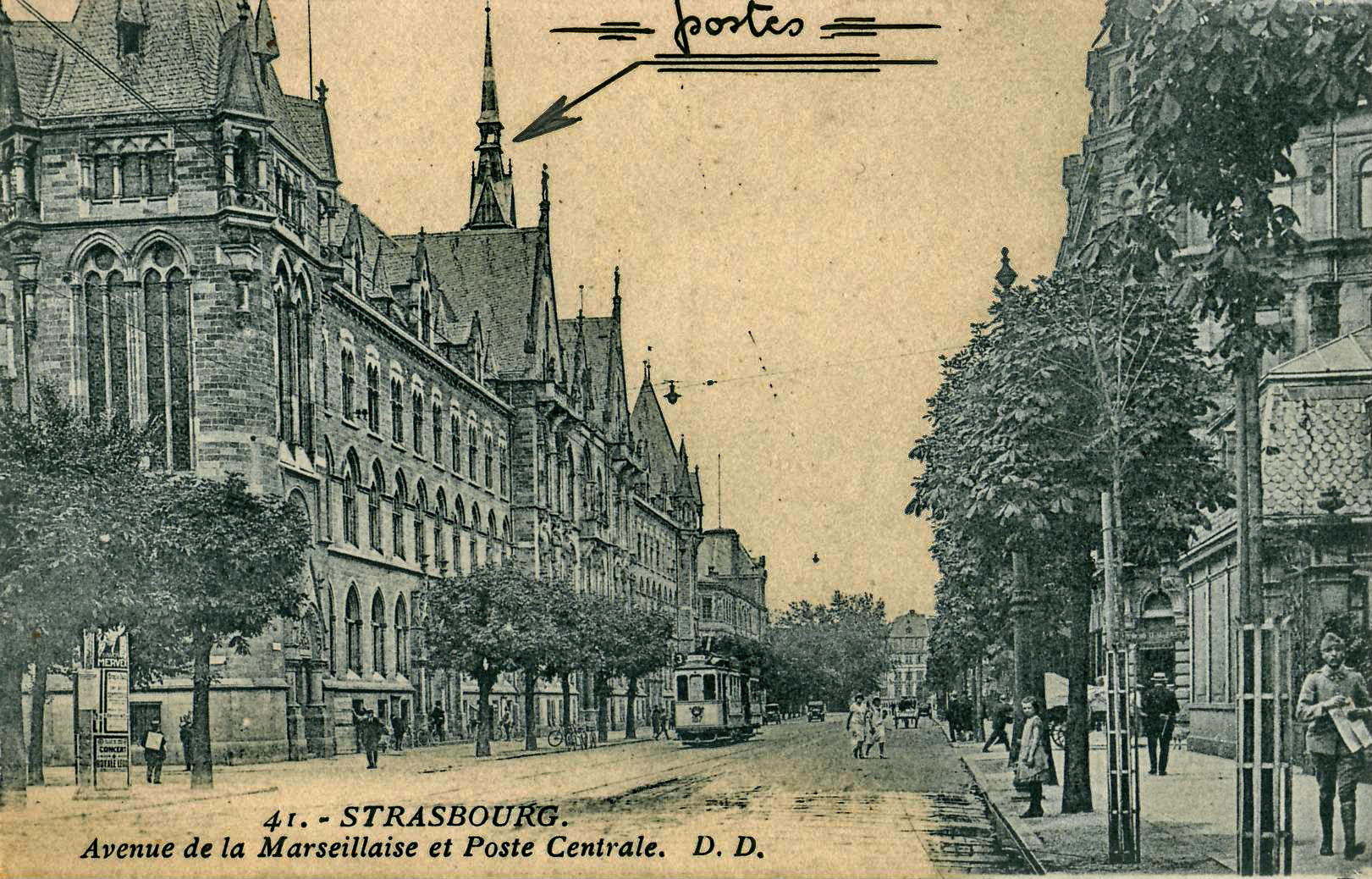
CTS tram on Line 3, Avenue de la Marseillaise, in the early 1920s

The declaration of war in 1914 took most of the company's staff (over 500 men from a labour force of 540). The business resorted to hiring over 260 women to keep the network running.

=== Between the wars ===
At the end of the war, the network was heavily damaged and split in two: the outer-Rhine lines were transferred to the Republic of Baden in 1922. It was during this period that the Bas-Rhin invested in the society, which was facing financial difficulties.

Although the first bus only appeared in 1928, the tramway transported over 50 million passengers during 1930. Despite that, traffic declined. The CTS turned towards tourism in 1932 with the creation of the ASTRA company, with luxury touring coaches.

=== World War II ===
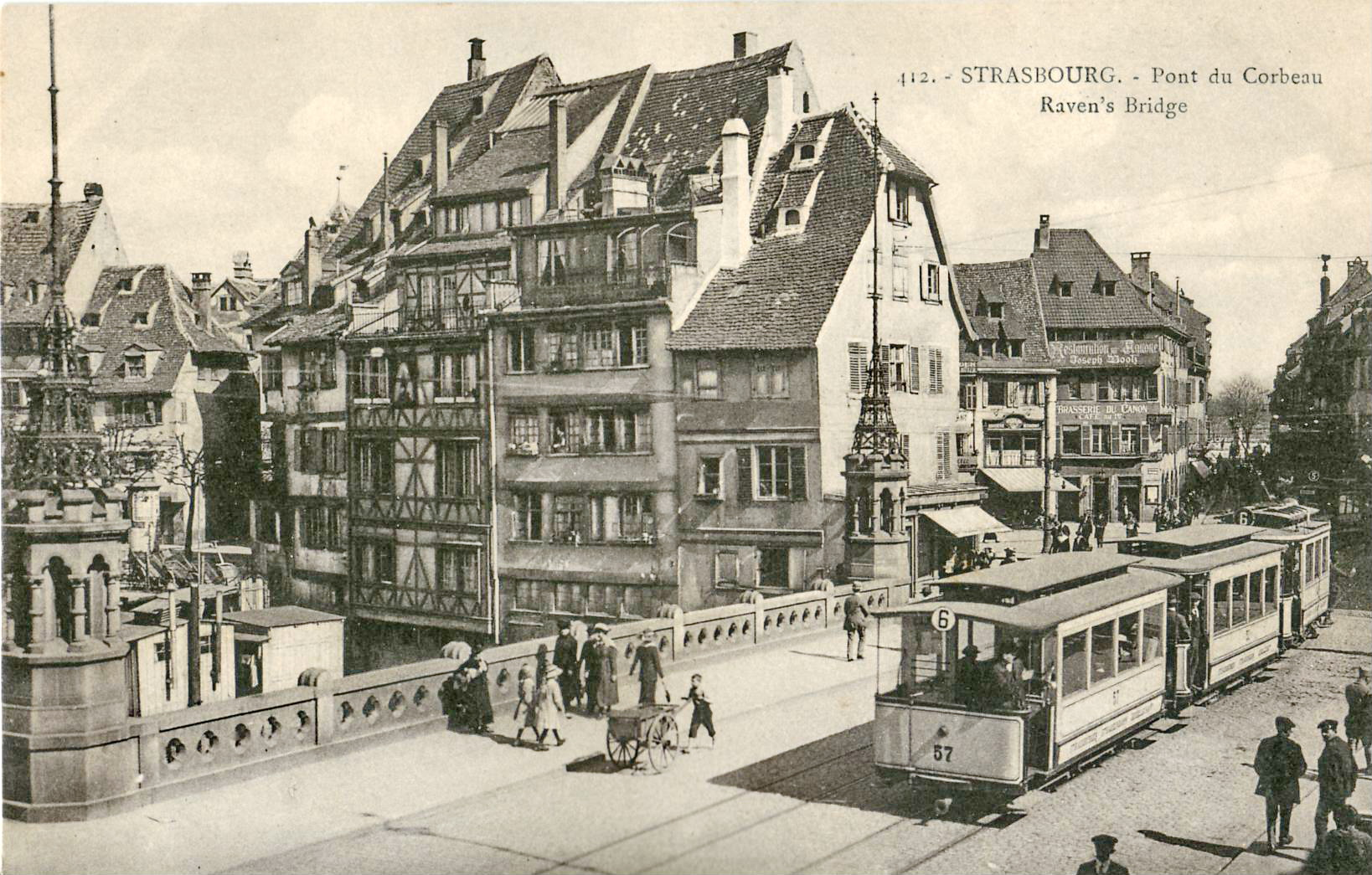
Old Line 6 tram on the Pont du Corbeau

To address the shortage of fuel, the Trolleybus made its appearance in 1939 on the Roethig – Ostwald line. The tram network served to evacuate Strasbourg so normal service stopped. Only the suburban network continued to run, to allow adequate provisioning of the French army. But the German authorities restarted the services when they took control of the city in June 1940. During the war, the tram network was one of the only methods on transport with a peak in usage, with nearly 73 million journeys in 1943. When Strasbourg became French again, the CTS faced a crisis, with a loss of human and material resources.

=== After World War II ===
After the war, the authorities considered the reconstruction of the network. Between 1940 and 1950 it replaced two tramways with trolleybuses, and turned decisively to buses thereafter. Buses would be easier for the armed forces to commandeer if war broke out again, and the company could not afford new locomotives for the network.

In 1953, the company began to replace the urban tramways with bus lines. On 1 May 1960 the tramway made its last journey on the 12 km (7.5 mi) line 4/14 (Neuhof Forest Wacken), and finished dismantling the network, work which had progressed gradually since the end of the war. Freight had not travelled by tramway since April 1958, except for manure which was transported until 1960.

In 1954, the CTS handed over the Rosheim – Saint-Nabor line (via Ottrott) to Carières de Saint-Nabor, which led to the discontinuation of passenger traffic on that line. Tourist steam locomotives continued to use the line until 1988. An 030T Borsig T3 and a postal van, both classed as Monuments Historiques, are preserved by the CTS at their Kibitzenau depot.

=== Network renewal ===
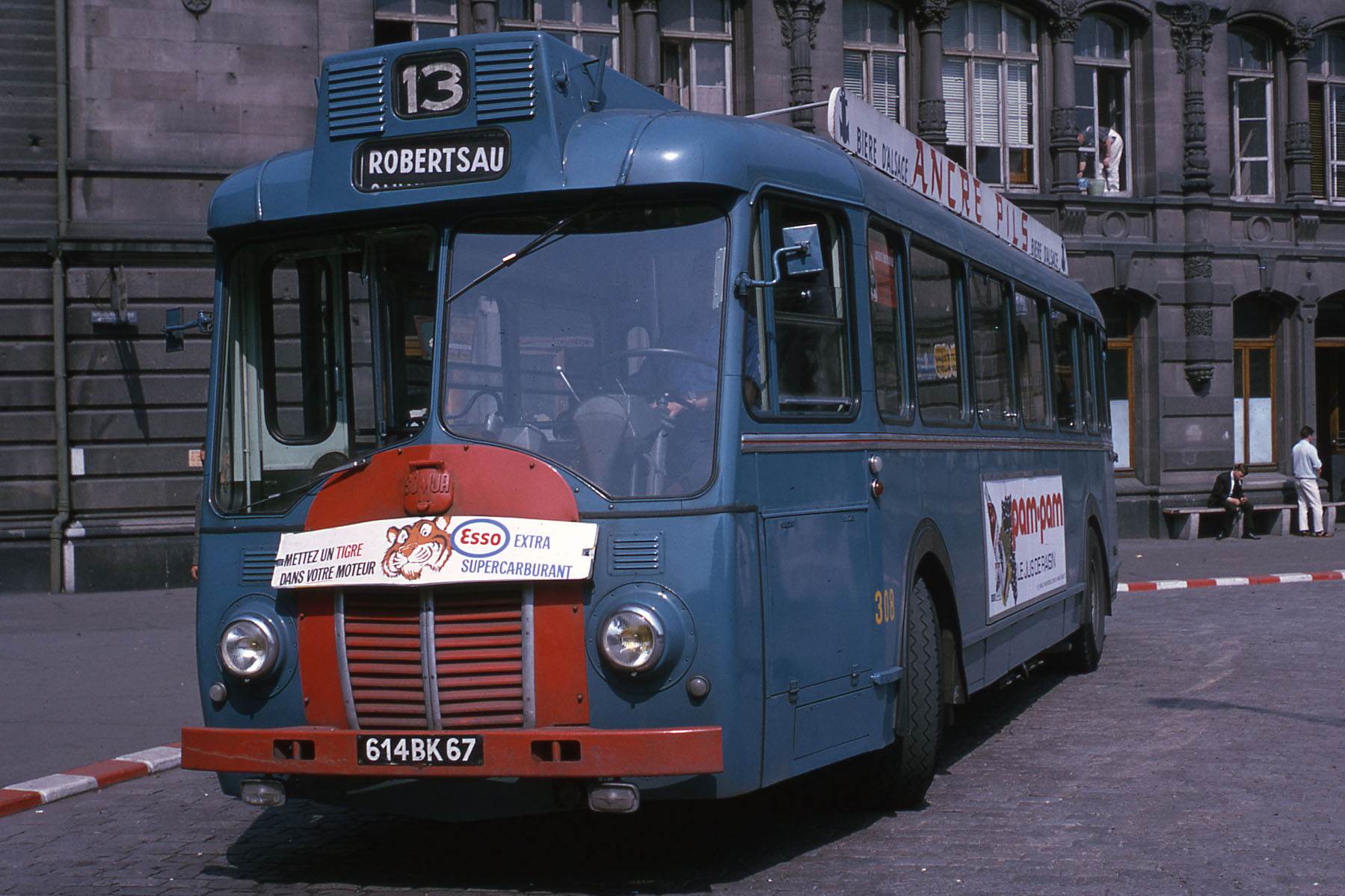
CTS bus in 1965 in the Place de la Gare

In spring 1962, the last trolleys were scrapped after circling the three lines 28 (Roethig - Ostwald), 5/15 (Place Broglie - Quartier de Quinze), and the 10 (the belt line). Dismantling the tramway caused a 20% drop in usage during the 1960s. The network was revolutionised in 1967 with the abolition of conductors. Their role was combined with that of the driver, so the drivers also collected the fares from the passengers. Reconquering the market continued with the creation of 4 km (2.5 mi) of separate bus lanes, and the introduction of articulated buses. In 1976 the single fare began, and the urban lines were extended to the whole of the Urban Community of Strasbourg.

The CTS refocused on public transport and resold ASTRA and its dedicated freight vehicles. It was one of the first transport companies to introduce an Intelligent transportation system allowing the exchange of data between the vehicles and a central command centre.

=== Return of the tramway ===
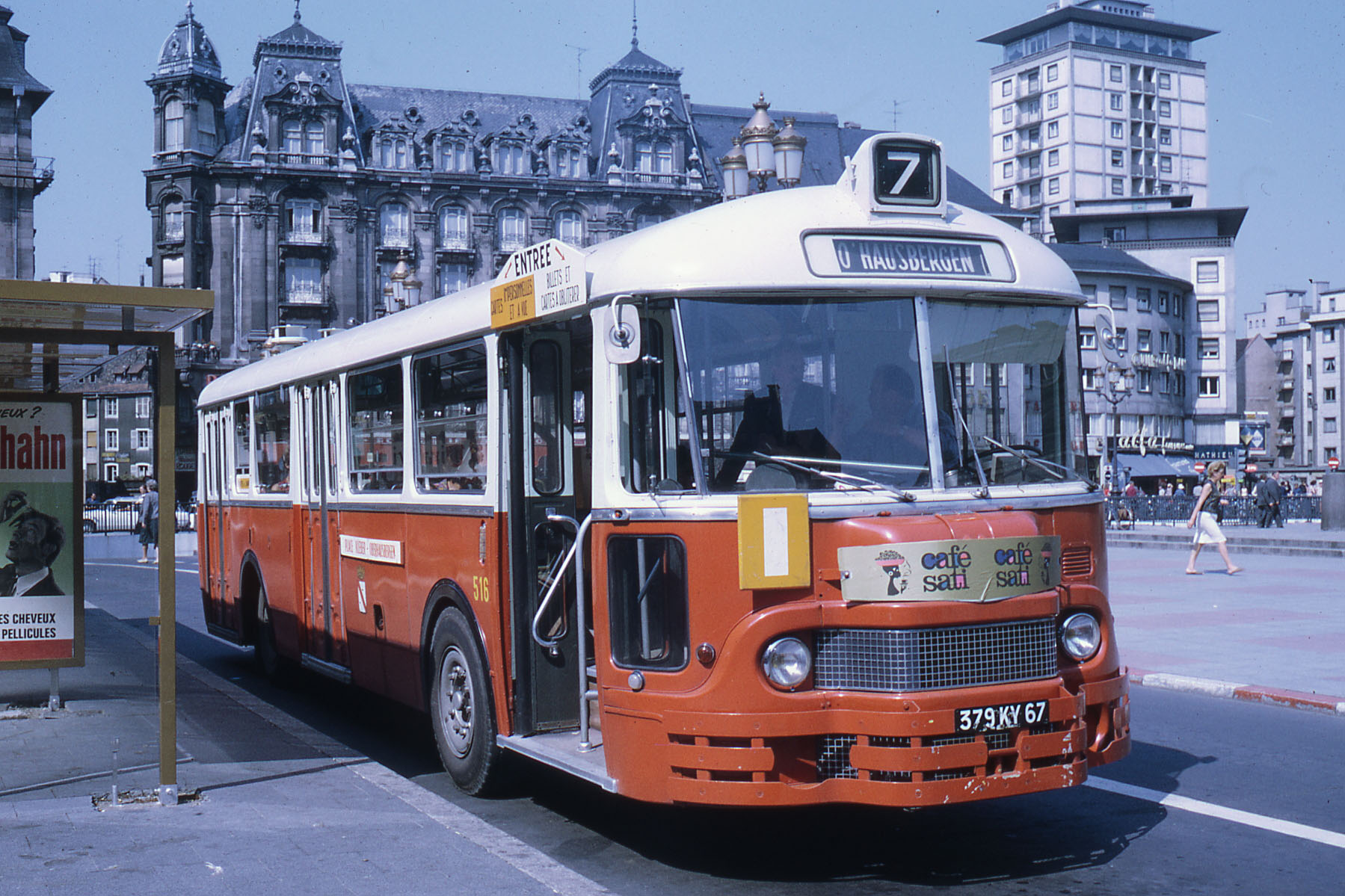
Bus in the Place Kléber in 1969, pedestrianised when the tramway arrived in 1994

At the end of the 1980s, the municipality launched a project to add a new type of public transport. A metro system was the first choice, with the prominence of Véhicule Automatique Léger, but after the municipal elections of 1989, the new municipality decided to turn back to the tramway. The CTS were assigned to manage the project, to begin in January 1991. The Line A went into service on 26 November 1994. With an initial length of 9.8 km (6.1 mi), it connected Hautepierre Maillon and Illkirch Baggersee'.

The CTS attempted to associate a multitude of services with the tramway. Since 1997, an airport shuttle bus has linked the airport with the tramway at Baggersee', cycle parks have been installed at certain stations etc. In 1998, the Line A was extended from Baggersee as far as Illkirch-Lixenbuhl, and creating the embryonic Line D, doubling the length of Line A by adding the segment Rotonde - Étoile Polygone.

Lines B and C first saw daylight in September 2000. Line B runs from Elsau and Hoenheim Station, and Line C is from Elsau to the Esplanade quarter.

A new type of ticketing was put in place in September 2004: the Badgeo card replaced the standard paper tickets on the urban routes. It was joined by an intercity network in 2006.

=== Grid network and new energy sources ===
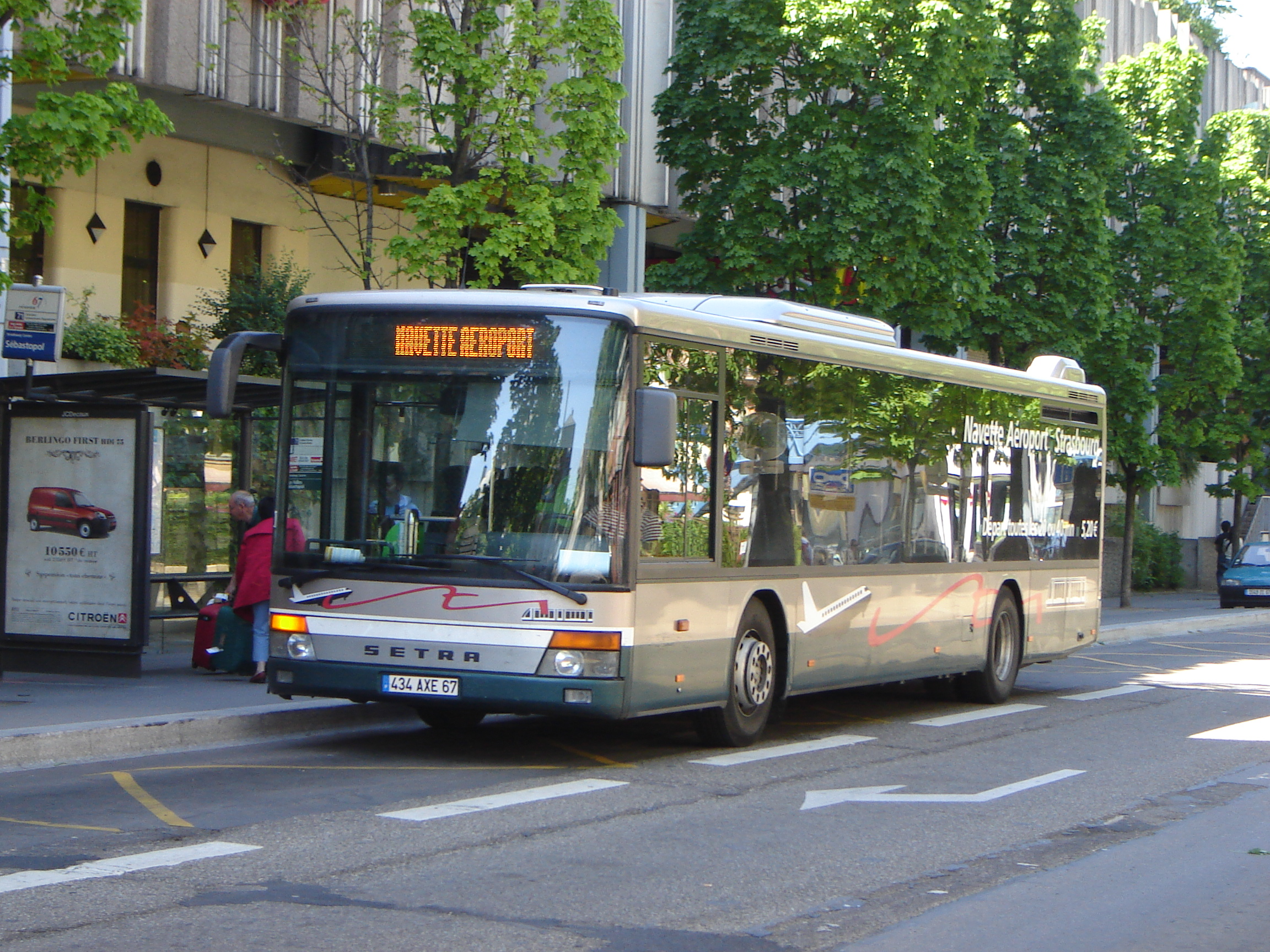
The Navette aéroport, suspended since 2008

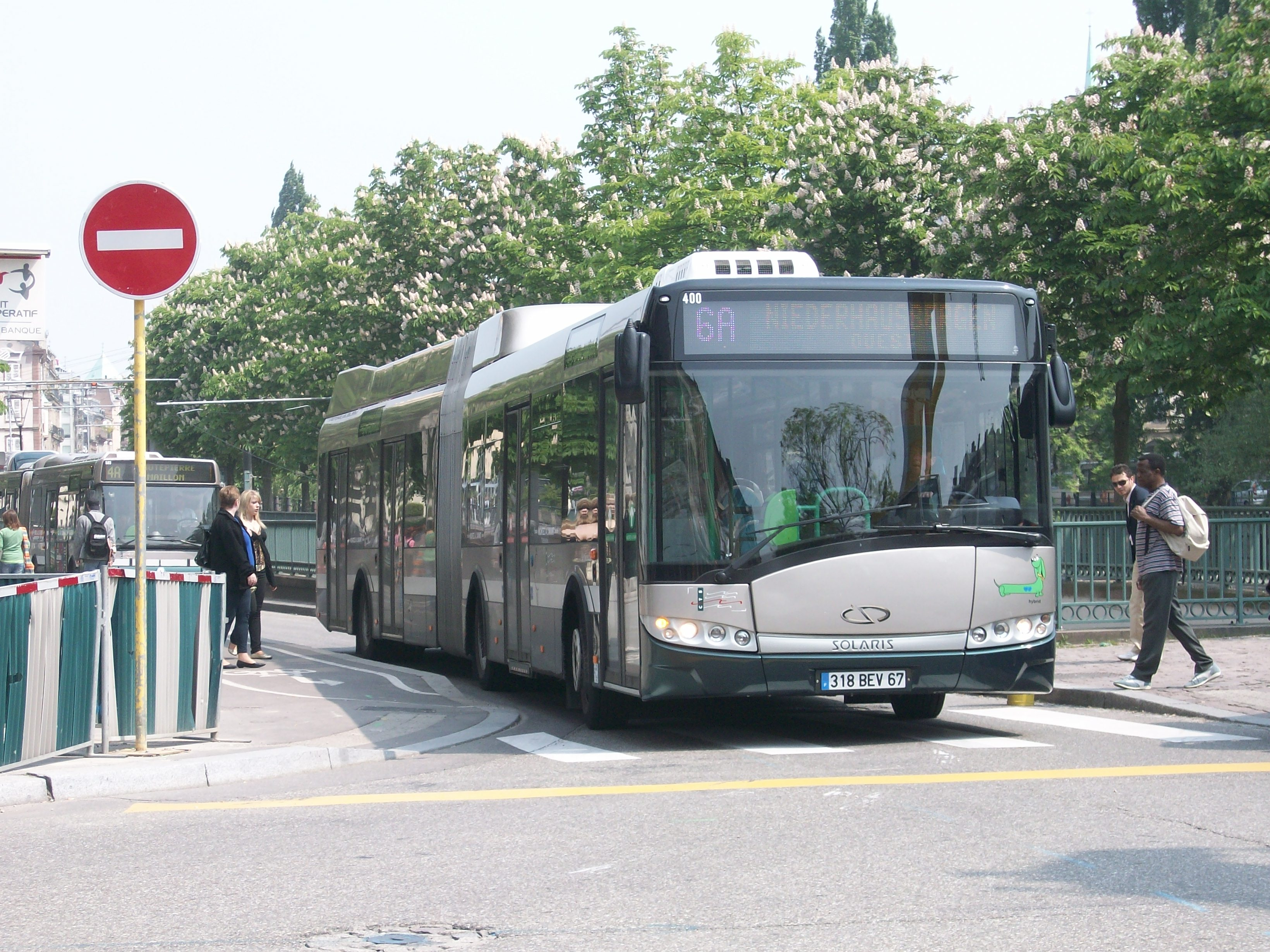
The CTS-tested hybrid-engined bus

Following the 2001 municipal elections, a new phase of network upgrades was approved. It was scheduled between 2006 and 2008, but several organisations and three individuals (including two elected Green councillors) appealed, and the work was delayed. That set of extensions did not begin until 25 August 2007 and completed in May 2008, allowing the creation of 13.5 km (8.4 mi) of track and 18 km (11 mi) of commercial lines.

In December 2008, the first phase of the tram-train went into service, and the CTS stopped the airport shuttle, which was replaced by the TER Alsace's new service.

At the end of 2008, the CTS launched an experiment with a hybrid articulated bus: a Solaris Urbino 18. This circled on Line 6 along with the diesel buses, allowing performance comparisons between the two engine types. After a year of circulation, the company judged the tests inconclusive and announced that it would not be acquiring further hybrid vehicles.

On 27 November 2010, the tramway network was upgraded with the creation of Line F between Elsau and the Place d'Islande and foreshadowing the tram-train, and Line C added a new segment from the station Gare Centrale to Neuhof Rudolphe Reuss. At the end of 2010, the city and the CTS filed a project to create a pneumatic tramway on the Wolfisheim – Vendenheim route via Strasbourg in the 2nd call for busway projects for Grenelle II This plan was widely criticised by local associations, residents, and the municipality opposition.

In parallel with the announcement of abandoning hybrid fuel, the company decided to continue buying vehicles running on natural gas. So, in November 2011, the Cronenbourg depot, which did not have facilities to accommodate natural gas buses, simultaneously equipped and put into circulation 30 gas Irisbus Citelis buses.

== Corporate structure ==
=== Share capital ===
The company capital (€5m) is shared:

- 52.4% by the Communauté urbaine de Strasbourg (CUS)
- 23.3% by the Conseil général du Bas-Rhin
- 12.5% by the private company Transdev

Other minor shareholders include the Caisse des dépôts et consignations (parent company of Transdev) and Électricité de Strasbourg.

The board is more than 80% controlled by local collectives. Major board members select the chairman of the board: currently Roland Ries (Senator-Mayor of Strasbourg), the vice-president of the CUS since May 2008.

=== Workforce ===
On 31 December 2010, the workforce numbered 1,457 including 971 drivers, compared to 1,539 employees (of which 935 were urban driver-conductors and 116 suburban) at 31 December 2003.

=== Financial structure ===
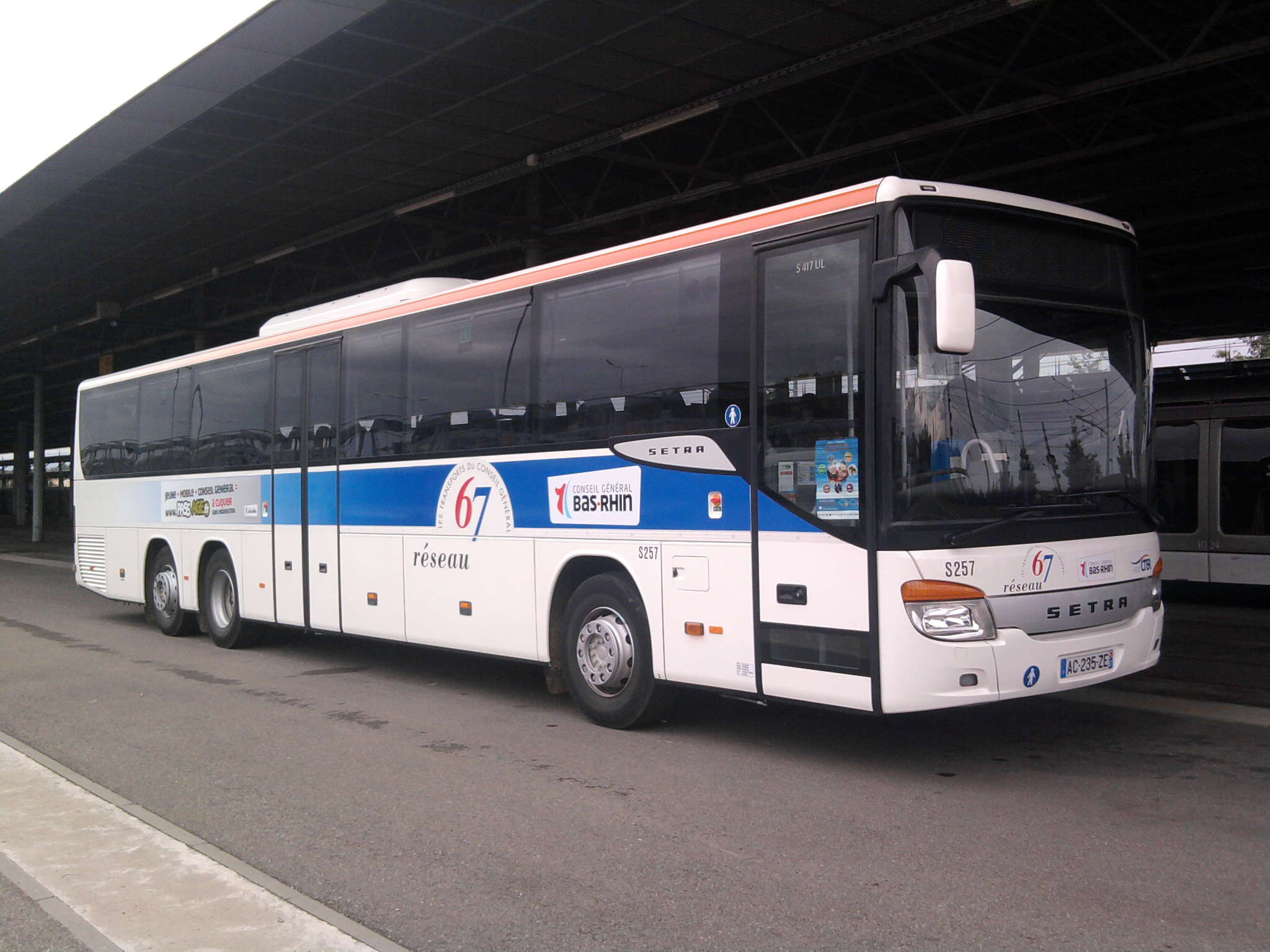
CTBR coach

A new range of fares was introduced in July 2010. Called the tarification solidaire, it recognises income splitting, but applies only to season tickets paid by subscription. The versement transport (VT) in the CUS has been fixed at 2% since 1 January 2011 (being 1.75% before).

In 2009, total expenses came to €192,014,173 and income €194,194,702, allowing a profit at fiscal year end of €2,180,528 (€276,817 in 2008). Of the whole provision, revenue represented only €63,269,204, or 31.6%, and this included the receipts from the territorial collectivities. The lump sum contribution of local (direct subsidiary) collectives brought in €47,955,557, or 24.6%, and transfer charges €40,766,350, or 21.0% of income.

All in all, the income from the CUS and the Department of Bas-Rhin came to around €120,720,000, including income from the VT reversed back into the CTS. But in 2009, assets included the suburban network, which today is run by a sister company, the CTBR. On the urban network, directly received commercial receipts from passengers amounted to no more than €0.5 per trip.

== Network ==
=== Tramway lines ===
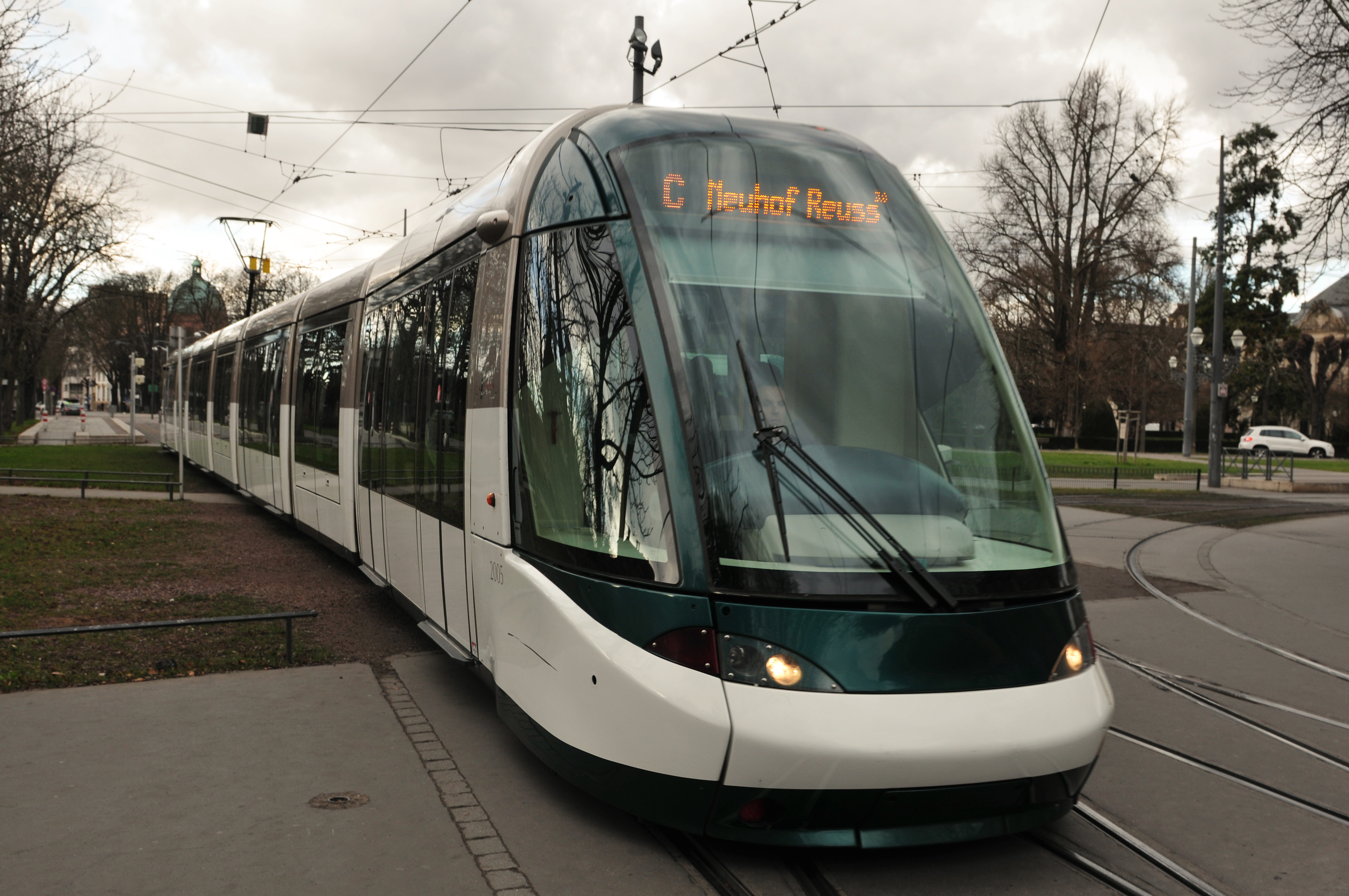

The current Strasbourg tramway network opened on 25 November 1994, serving the Urban Community of Strasbourg. It has six lines, totalling more than 40 km (25 mi) of track, and 55 km (34 mi) of route (some routes sharing track in the city centre). It is the second longest tramway network in France, after the Lyon tramway.

It was the first tramway network in France to have low-floor trams. Rolling stock consists of 53 Eurotrams (manufactured by Bombardier Transportation), later augmented by 41 Alstom Citadis cars of a similar general design to the Eurotram. Strasbourg's tramway network, unlike those of some other towns and cities in France, is more of a grid (rather than being hub and spoke). In the city centre, all tracks are shared by at least two lines, and three lines share the tracks between the stations of Homme de Fer and Observatoire, which makes for easy interchange and increases service frequency in the city centre.

Line		Route	Provider
tramA	Disabled access	Parc des Sports - Graffenstaden	CTS
tramB	Disabled access	Lingolsheim Tiergaertel - Hoenheim Gare	CTS
tramC	Disabled access	Gare Centrale - Neuhof Rodolphe Reuss	CTS
tramD	Disabled access	Poteries - Kehl Rathaus	CTS
tramE	Disabled access	Roberstau L'Escale - Campus d'Illkirch	CTS
tramF	Disabled access	Wolfisheim Henri Rendu - Place d'Islande	CTS

=== Bus and shuttle routes ===
The Urban Community of Strasbourg bus network covers the entire area, and also serves the town of Kehl in Germany, opposite the Rhine from Strasbourg, via the Europe Bridge. There are more than twenty bus and shuttle routes. Most are operated by the CTS, but some are subcontracted to local companies. The network is integrated into the tramway lines, and does not go into the most central part of the city, which is reserved for pedestrians and trams.

The last major review of the system happened with the extensions to the tramway network in August 2007. A study looking at the entire bus system is scheduled for 2013.

=== Compagnie des transports du Bas-Rhin ===
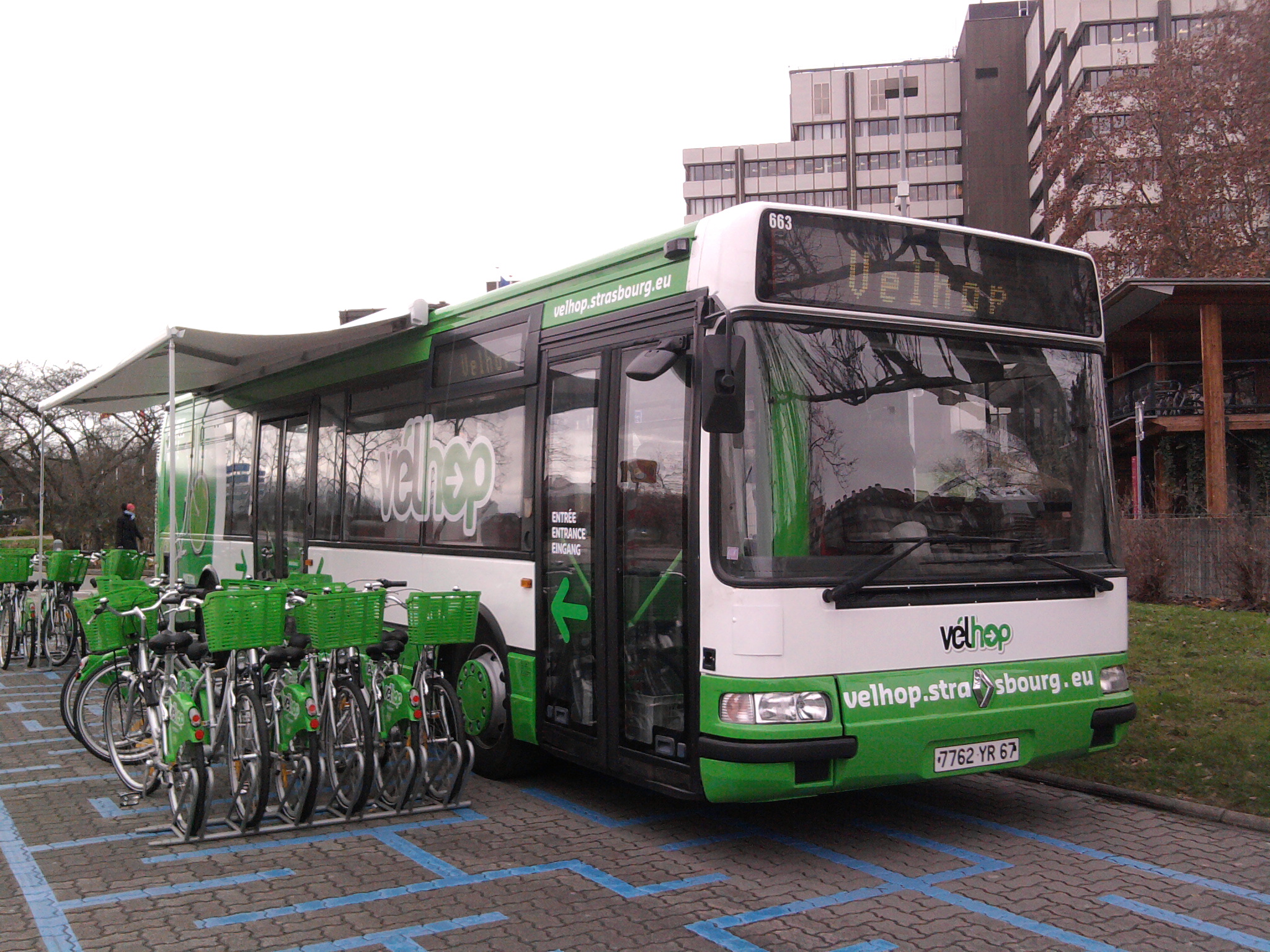
Vélhop bus (previously a CTS bus)

In 2008, the CTS established a joint venture with Transdev, Mugler and Striebig to operate Réseau 67 ("Network 67"). The Compagnie des transports du Bas-Rhin (CBTR) took over more than twenty routes under the auspices of the Conseil général du Bas-Rhin. Ownership of coaches was transferred from the CTS to the conseil général, and the CTBR redistributed them between the four carriers. Other vehicles remained the property of the companies that had bought them.

=== Vélhop ===
Since 2010, Vélhop has been the bicycle hire service for the CUS, provided by the CTS.

Plans were that by the end of 2011, over 4,400 Vélhops could be hired from automatic stations, either inside shops or on specially-equipped buses.

== Vehicles ==
=== Tramway ===
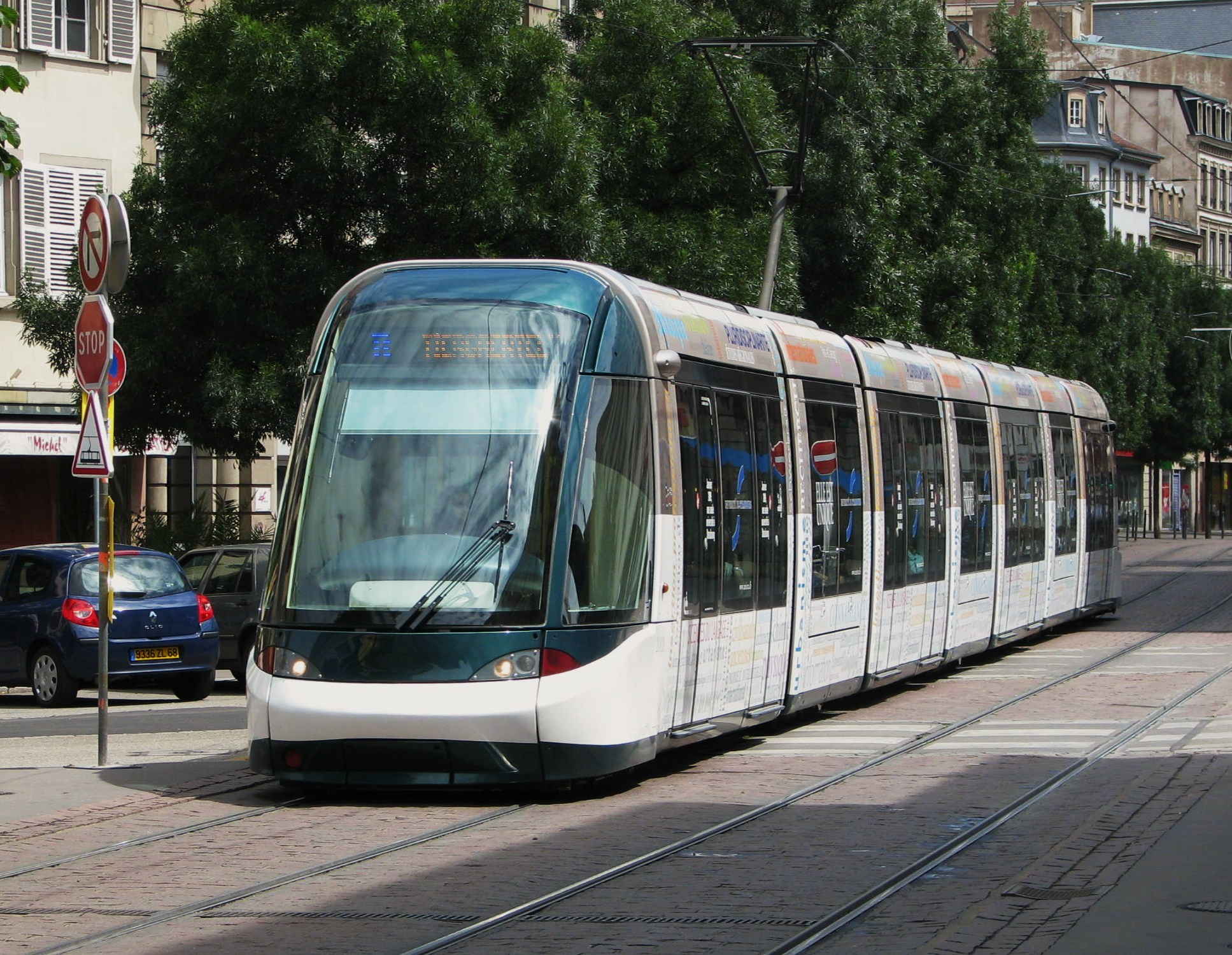
Citadis 403

In 2011, the CTS had 94 tramcars of three different types, all of which could run over all routes.

Constructor	Model	Quantity	Fleet numbers	Years in service	Length
ABB	Eurotram	14	1001–1003, 1005–1008, 1010, 1013, 1018, 1021–1024	1994–1995	33 m (108 ft)
Adtranz	Eurotram	10	1031–1040	1998–2000	33 m (108 ft)
Adtranz	Eurotram	17	1051–1067	1998–2000	43 m (141 ft)
Alstom	Citadis 403	41	2001–2041	2005–2006	45 m (148 ft)
Alstom	Citadis 403	22 (+ 17 ordered)	3001–3022	2016–2018	45 m (148 ft)

The trams move all over the network, although lines E and F are usually served by three-car trams because they are the least loaded

An update and upgrade of the Citadis 403 has been ordered in 2013, these 22 trams are fitted to be used on the German part of the network. More trams were ordered in early 2020 to get rid of the first batch of Eurotram from ABB.

=== Bus ===
==== Standard ====
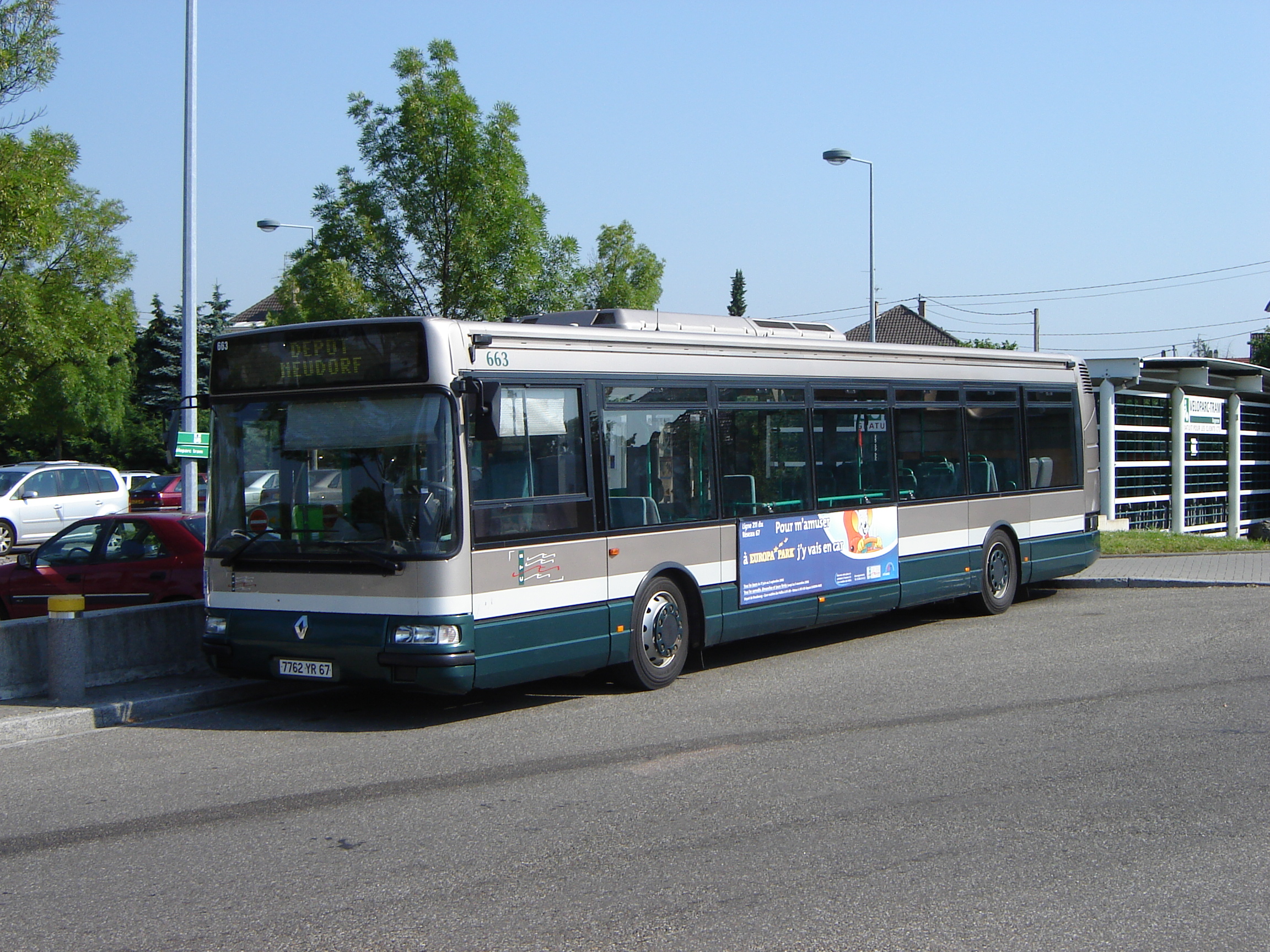
Renault Agora S, the network's most widespread standard bus until 2005–2007.

Constructor	Model	Fuel	Quantity	Fleet numbers	Years in service
Irisbus	Irisbus Agora S	Diesel	39	851 – 900 (slowly retired from 2019 until 2021)	2003 – 2005
Heuliez Bus	Heuliez GX 327	CNG	41	755 – 795	2005 – 2007
Solaris	Solaris Urbino 12	Diesel	8	616 – 623	2010
Irisbus	Irisbus Citelis 12	CNG	32	401 – 432	2011 - 2014
Iveco Bus	Iveco Bus Urbanway 12	CNG	8	433 – 440	2015
Alstom	Alstom Aptis	Electric	12	813 – 824	2019 - 2020

==== Articulated ====
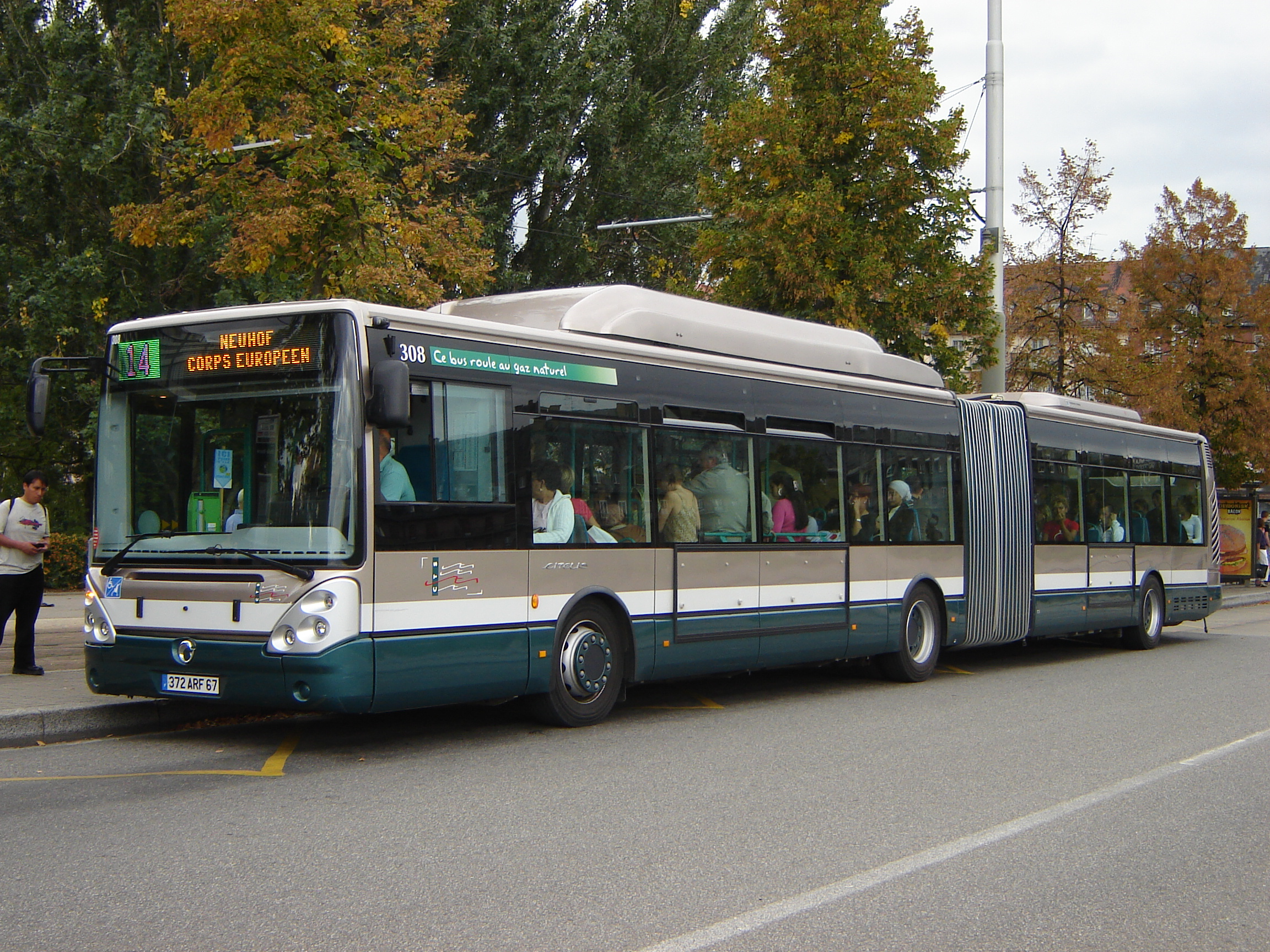
CNG-fuelled Irisbus Citelis 18

Constructor	Model	Fuel	Quantity	Fleet numbers	Years in service
Irisbus	Irisbus Citelis 18	CNG	23	301 – 313, 339 – 352	2005 – 2007, 2011
Irisbus	Irisbus Citelis 18	Diesel	24	314 – 338	2003 – 2005
Solaris	Solaris Urbino 18	Hybrid	1	400	2010
Mercedes-Benz	Mercedes-Benz Citaro G	CNG	11	801 – 811	2013 + 2016
Solaris	Solaris Urbino 18	CNG	20	361 – 373, 388 – 394 & 701 – 707	2015–2016, 2018
Irisbus	Iveco Bus Urbanway 18	CNG	7	354 – 360	2015

=== Charter buses ===
The CTS subcontracts some routes to other operating companies: 21, 27 and 31, the three shuttles and school buses. The CTS does not own the vehicles used on these routes.

==== Standard ====
GTS is using three Mercedes-Benz Citaro & Citaro Low-Entry, for the lines 27, 31 and school services.

Since 2018, LK Kunegel is using 17 S 415 LE from Setra for the lines 64, 71, 72, 73, 75 & 77.

==== Articulated ====
In 2011, articulated buses were chartered by Kunegel, with five Van Hool AG300s used on school services, and by Transdev Alsace, which operated three Van Hool AG300s, four Mercedes-Benz Citaro Gs and a single Renault Agora L. These services were used on route 31 and school services.

Since the opening of the Kehl tram branch in 2017, there are no more articulated buses used by any charter.

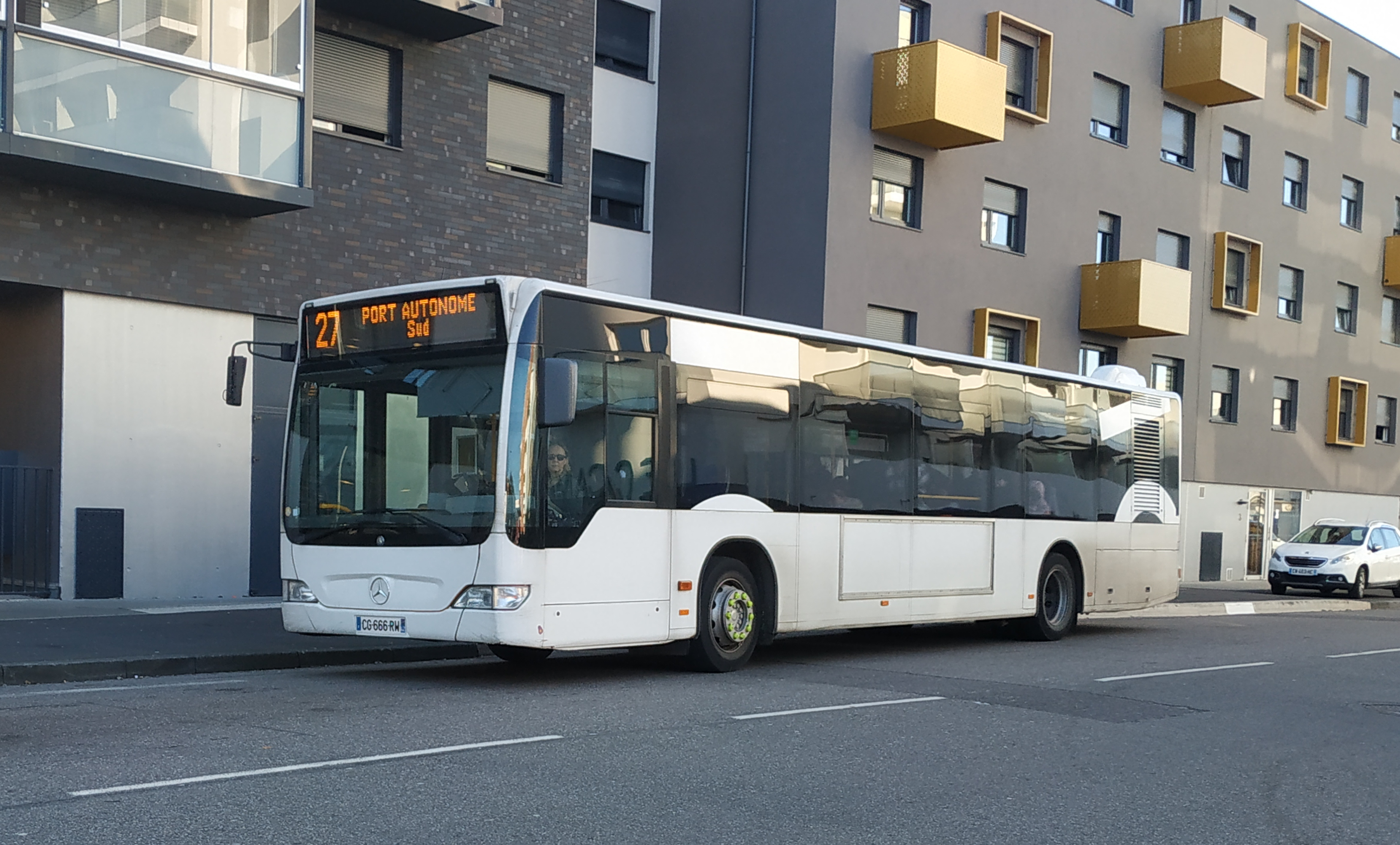
Mercedes-Benz Citaro on line 27.

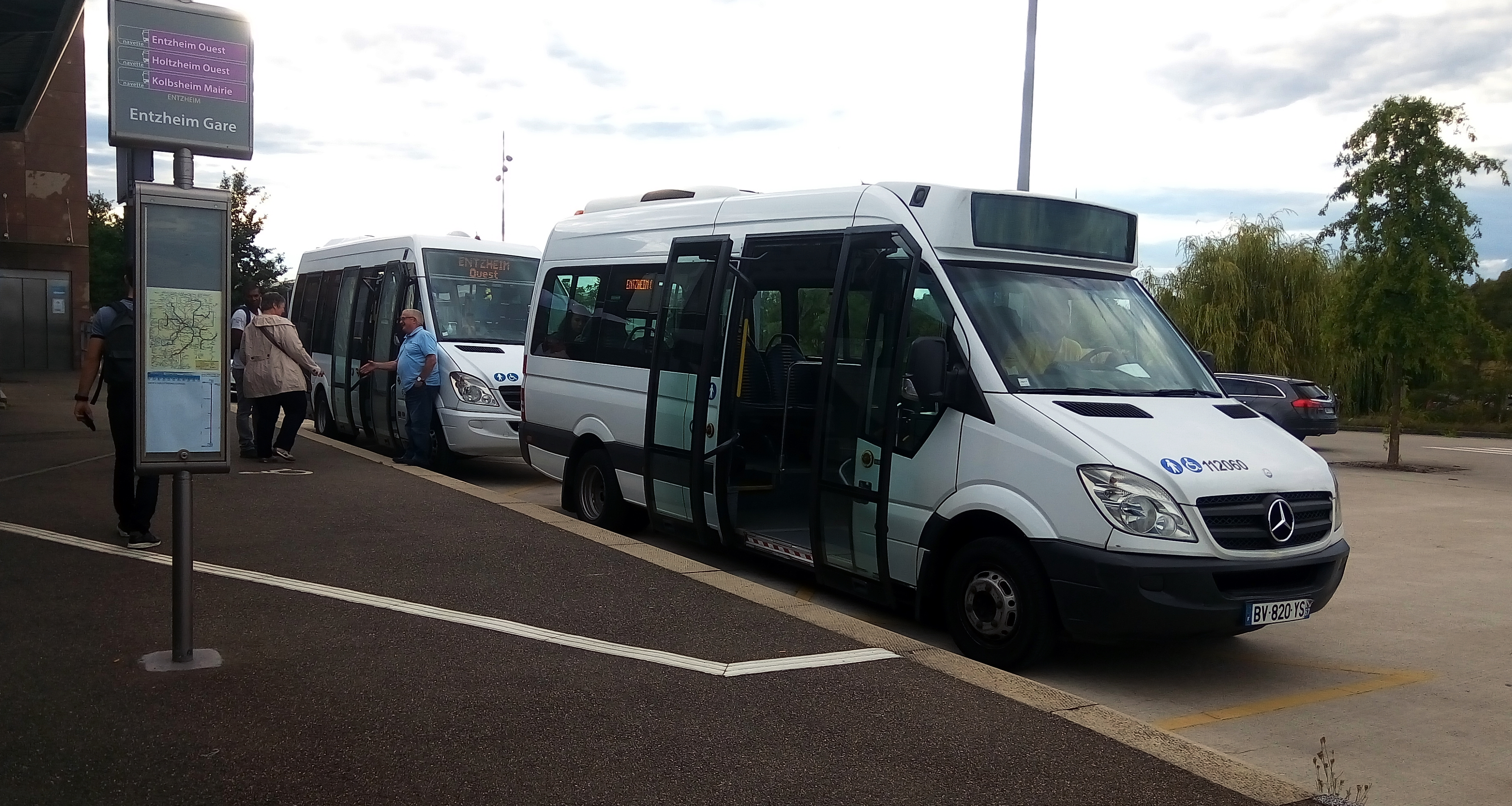
Mercedes-Benz Sprinter City on shuttles getting to the Airport.

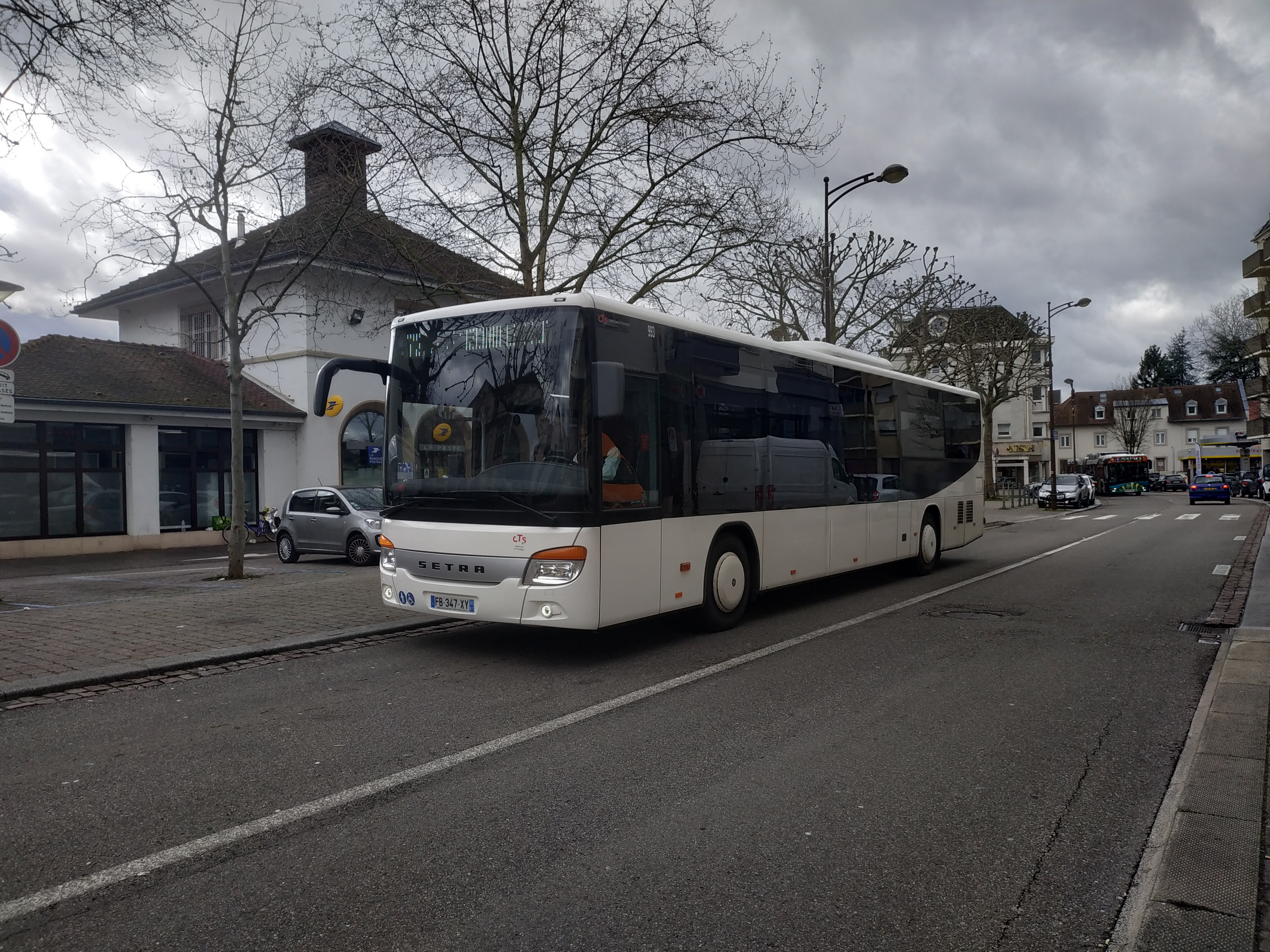
S 415 LE the lines operated by Kunegel.

=== Low-height buses and minibuses ===
The CTS has no midibuses (reduced-capacity buses). Minibuses are used on shuttles run by GTS with some Mercedes-Benz Sprinter City.

== Livery ==
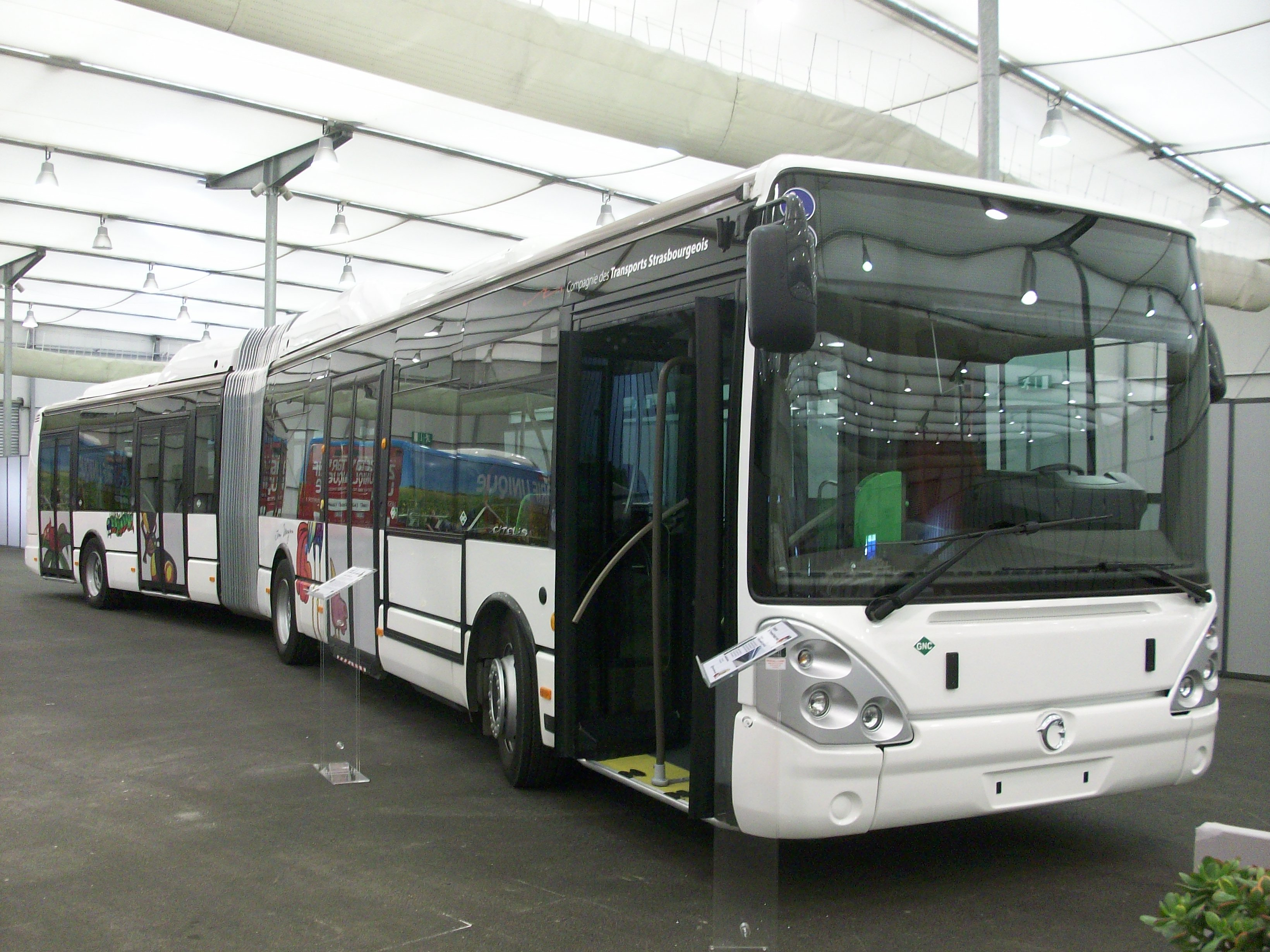
The new CTS livery (since 2011), white with detail by a different artist each year (in 2011, Tomi Ungerer)

When the tramways start in 1877, first horse-drawn and since 1984 electrically powered, the livery was entirely green. But in 1907, a decision was taken to repaint the entire fleet and other infrastructure in ivory. The ivory livery lasted until the tramways were dismantled in 1960.

In the 1960s, the livery was predominantly blue, except for the grille and bumpers, which were red. But the company started to put new colours on their vehicles: white for the vehicle top and red-orange for the bottom, echoing the town's colours and those of the region of Alsace.

In the 1980s, the network consisted only of bus routes operated by a single model, the Renault SC10, and the livery was the same on every vehicle: cream on the top with red on the bottom. The suburban network was operated by some Saviem S53s in a livery of grey with a light gree-blue band. As new bus models appeared, at the start of the 1990s, the company slightly changed the livery; the white background stayed, but several red-orange bands reappeared on the vehicles.

When the tramway was reintroduced, the company completely rethought its visual identity. The whole of the urban network (bus and tram) was put in the same livery. So, on buses, the bottom was in dark green and the rest of the vehicle in dark grey. Between the two colours, there was a 30 cm (12 in) band. On the trams, the theme stayed the same but underwent several minor changes: the green stayed at the bottom but to a lesser extent. In 2005, the delivery of the new Alstom Citadis 403 cars reduced the amount of green once again (with more prominence on each end of the car set), and white was by far the most prominent colour (only on the Citadis).

In 2011, when more new vehicles were delivered, the company again presented a new livery. It is entirely white, but vehicles are decorated by a different artist chosen annually. The 29 new natural gas-powered vehicles (14 articulated and 15 standard Irisbus Citelis units) delivered in 2011 were decorated by the artist Tomi Ungerer.

== Depots ==
The CTS has three depots, all in Strasbourg. Each of the depots is designated as a mixed "unit of production" (UP), which is taken from the first letter of the depot: UPC (Cronenbourg), UPE (Elsau) and UPK (Kibitzenau). They are all "mixed", and can handle both buses and trams (repair and maintenance shops and cleaning stations).

=== Cronenbourg ===
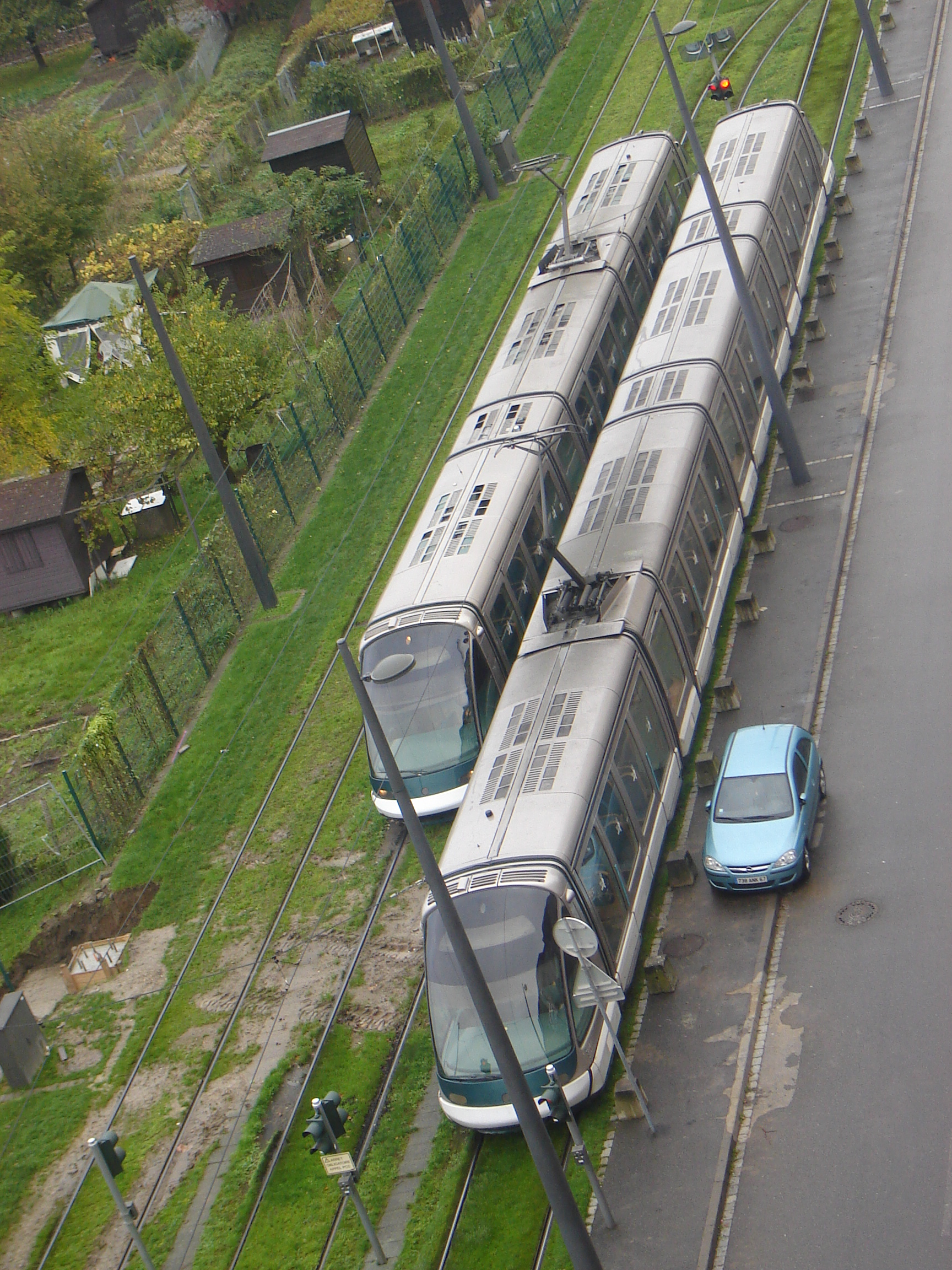
Elsau station, next to the Elsau depot

The corporate headquarters is located in Strasbourg, in the Cronenbourg quarter. The depot was built in 1931 and was renovated and enlarged between 1992 and 1994, to service the new tramway. Its official designation is UPC. In 2011, il was equipped to handle CNG-powered buses.

The depot also houses the company administration, and the central supervision (French: Poste de commandes centralisées (PCC, "Central Command Post") which co-ordinates the movements of the entire bus and tramway network. A single track connects the Rotonde station with the depot, and so allows trams to access the rest of the network.

Lines and routes connected to UPC
Tramway	A, D
Bus	4, 6, 17, 19, 70, 71, 72

=== Elsau ===
The Elsau depot was created for the tramway network extension, to serve lines B and C. It was inaugurated in 2000. With the 2010 network restructuring, the depot took over the new line F but lost line C, which moved to Kibitzenau. It opened for business in September 1999. It has a compression station for natural gas. Its official denomination is GPE. The depot can rapidly recharge gas-powered vehicles; the Strasbourg authorities want to increase the fleet of gas-powered rolling stock.

Lines and routes connected to UPE
Tramway	B, F
Bus	2, 10, 12, 13, 15, 15a, 22, 50

=== Kibitzenau ===
The Kibitzenau depot is the newest, inaugurated in January 2006 as part of the 2007–08 tramway extensions. It replaced the previous depot at Neudorf. The station is "mixed", handling both buses and trams, and also has a natural gas compression station.

Its official designation is UPK.

Lines and routes connected to UPK
Tramway	C, E
Bus	7, 14, 24, 40, 62, 63, 65, 66

=== Neudorf ===
The Neudorf depot, designated UPN, was located at Aristide Briand. It was demolished in 2005–06, to be replaced by the Kibitzenau depot, since it was not able to handle trams.

== Maintenance equipment ==
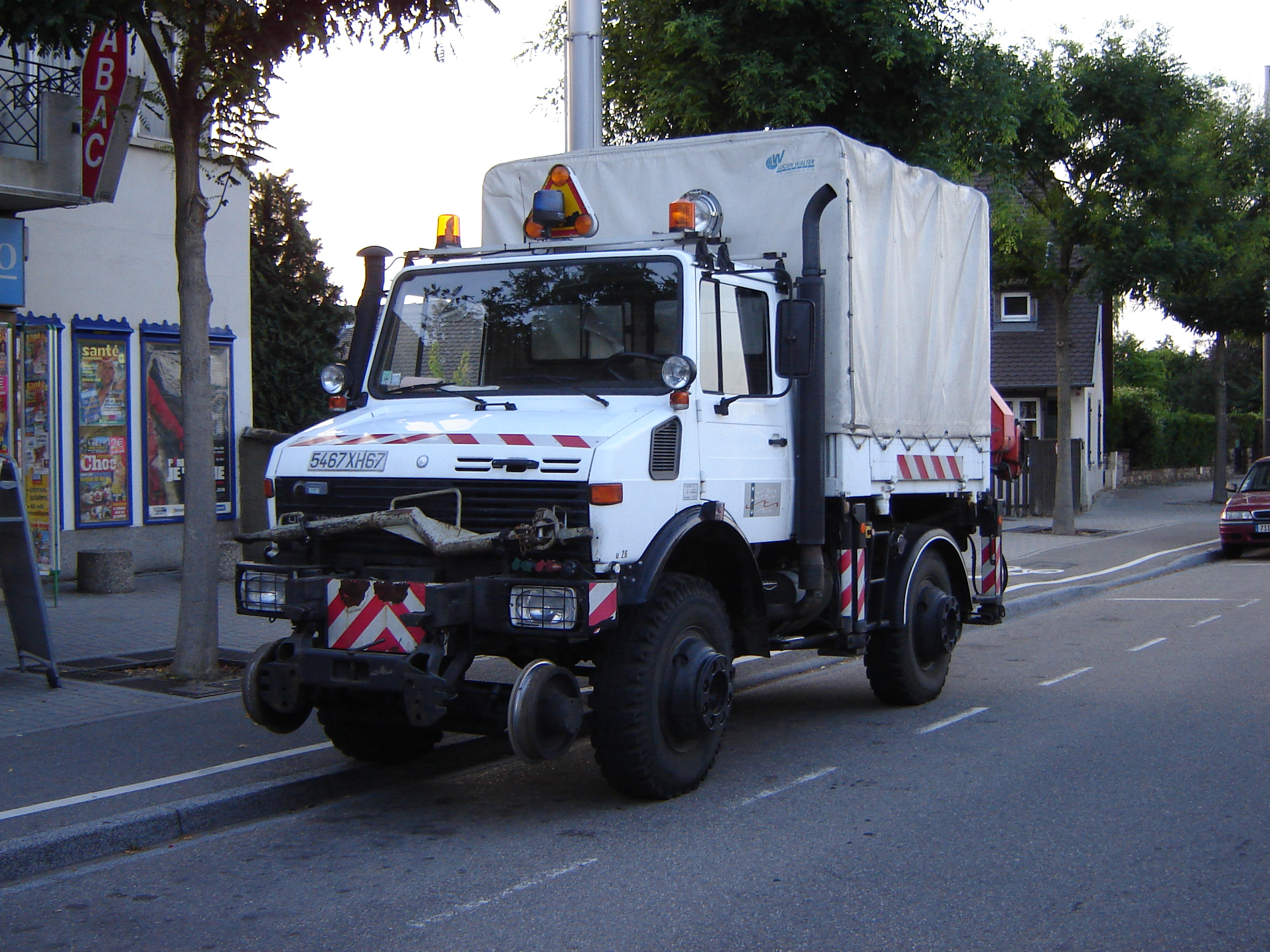
The CTS's Unimog

The extent and frequency of the network means it needs continuous maintenance. The CTS keeps a fleet of maintenance vehicles for both the bus and tram networks.

Two lorries called Aspirails travel the tramway network each day, to get rid of foreign objects in the rail grooves. If there is a fault on the rolling stock or the fixed infrastructure, the CTS has a fleet of road-rail vehicles, such as tractors, a Unimog and several bulldozers.

For the bus network, the company uses tractors as tow trucks. In parallel, a fleet of minibuses (Renault Master, Renault Kangoo, and so on) are available to transport the mechanics and service staff around the entire network.

Maintenance equipment is not painted in the CTS livery: vehicles are white, with the company logo affixed. Vehicle storage is distributed between the three depots.

== Sources ==
- La Compagnie des Transports Strasbourgeois: 125 ans d'histoire illustrée [The Strasbourg Transport Company: A 125-year illustrated history] (in French). Strasbourg: Compagnie des Transports Strasbourgeois. August 2003. ISBN 2-9520527-0-0.
- Muller, Georges (2000). Génération Tram (in French). Strasbourg: Oberlin. ISBN 2-85369-209-4.
- Muller, Georges (1994). L'année du Tram (in French). Strasbourg: Ronald Hirlé. ISBN 2-910048-15-2.
- Perry, Laurence (2005). Répertoire numérique détaillé des archives de la compagnie des transports strasbourgeois (C.T.S) : des origines à la fin du premier tramway [Detailed numerical list of the archives of the CTS: From its origin to the demise of the original tramway] (in French). Strasbourg: Archive service.
