= Les-bains =

Les-bains or Les bains (French pronunciation: [le bɛ̃]; French: 'the baths'), usually indicating the presence of a spa, may refer to:

== Populated places ==
- Aix-les-Bains, commune in the Savoie department in southeastern France
- Alet-les-Bains, commune in the Aude department in southern France
- Amélie-les-Bains-Palalda, commune in the Pyrénées-Orientales department in southern France
- Andernos-les-Bains, commune in the Gironde department in southwestern France
- Arromanches-les-Bains, commune in the Calvados department in northwestern France
- Aulus-les-Bains, commune in the Ariège department in southwestern France
- Bains-les-Bains, commune in the Vosges department in northeastern France
- Canton of Bains-les-Bains, administrative and electoral grouping of communes in the Vosges department in eastern France
- Balaruc-les-Bains, commune in the Hérault department in southern France
- Bourbonne-les-Bains, commune in the Haute-Marne department in northeastern France
- Brides-les-Bains, commune in the Savoie department in southeastern France
- Cambo-les-Bains, commune in the Pyrénées-Atlantiques department in southwestern France
- Charbonnières-les-Bains, commune in the Rhône department in southeastern France
- Digne-les-Bains, commune in and capital of the Alpes-de-Haute-Provence department in southeastern France
- Arrondissement of Digne-les-Bains, arrondissement in the Alpes-de-Haute-Provence department in southeastern France
- Divonne-les-Bains, commune in the Ain department in eastern France
- Donville-les-Bains, commune in the Manche department in northwestern France
- Enghien-les-Bains, commune in the northern suburbs of Paris, France
- Eugénie-les-Bains, commune in the Landes department in southwestern France
- Évaux-les-Bains, commune in the Creuse department in central France
- Canton of Évaux-les-Bains, administrative and electoral grouping of communes in the Creuse department in central France
- Évian-les-Bains, commune in the Haute-Savoie department in eastern France
- Gréoux-les-Bains, commune in the Alpes-de-Haute-Provence department in southeastern France
- Lamalou-les-Bains, commune in the Hérault department in southern France
- Luxeuil-les-Bains, commune in the Haute-Saône department in eastern France
- Manapany-les-Bains, village on the island of Réunion
- Mers-les-Bains, commune in the Somme department in northern France
- Mondorf-les-Bains, commune and town in southeastern Luxembourg
- Le Monêtier-les-Bains, commune in the Hautes-Alpes department in southeastern France
- Canton of Le Monêtier-les-Bains, administrative and electoral grouping of communes in the Hautes-Alpes department in southeastern France
- Montrond-les-Bains, commune in the Loire department in central France
- Néris-les-Bains, commune in the Allier department in central France
- Niederbronn-les-Bains, commune in the Bas-Rhin department in northeastern France
- Morsbronn-les-Bains, commune in the Bas-Rhin department in northeastern France
- Ogeu-les-Bains, commune in the Pyrénées-Atlantiques department in southwestern France
- Plombières-les-Bains, commune in the Vosges department in northeastern France
- Canton of Plombières-les-Bains, administrative and electoral grouping of communes in the Vosges department in eastern France
- Rennes-les-Bains, commune in the Aude department in southern France
- Saint-Gervais-les-Bains, commune in the Haute-Savoie department in southeastern France
- Saint-Honoré-les-Bains, commune in the Nièvre department in central-east France
- Saint-Laurent-les-Bains, commune in the Ardèche department in southern France
- Salins-les-Bains, commune in the Jura department in eastern France
- Sierck-les-Bains, commune in the Moselle department in northeastern France
- Thonon-les-Bains, commune in the Haute-Savoie department in southeastern France
- Arrondissement of Thonon-les-Bains, arrondissement in the Haute-Savoie department in southeastern France
- Vals-les-Bains, commune in the Ardèche department in southern France
- Vernet-les-Bains, commune in the Pyrénées-Orientales department in southern France
- Yverdon-les-Bains, municipality in the district of Jura-Nord vaudois in the canton of Vaud in Switzerland

== Buildings and infrastructure ==
=== Transport infrastructure ===
- Gare d'Alet-les-Bains, railway station in Alet-les-Bains
- Gare de Cambo-les-Bains, railway station in Cambo-les-Bains
- Chambéry Aix-les-Bains Airport, alternative name for Chambéry Airport
- Gare d'Ogeu-les-Bains, railway station in Ogeu-les-Bains
- Gare de Saint-Gervais-les-Bains-Le Fayet, railway station in Saint-Gervais-les-Bains
- Funiculaire de Thonon-les-Bains, funicular railway in the spa town of Thonon-les-Bains
- Youks-les-Bains Airfield, abandoned military airfield in Algeria

=== Other buildings and infrastructure ===
- Aix-les-Bains Circuit du Lac, motor-racing track in operation at Aix-les-Bains from 1949 to 1960
- Les Bains Des Docks, aquatic Center in the city of Le Havre, France
- Arboretum de Bains-les-Bains, arboretum in Bains-les-Bains
- Village arboretum de Vernet-les-Bains, arboretum in Vernet-les-Bains
- Yverdon-les-Bains, castle in the municipality of Yverdon-les-Bains in the canton of Vaud in Switzerland

== Other uses ==
- Les Bains Douches 18 December 1979, 1979 live album by the British band Joy Division

== See also ==
- Bain (disambiguation)
- Bains (disambiguation)
