= Bane =

Bane may refer to:

== Fictional characters ==
- Bane (DC Comics), an adversary of Batman
- Bane (Harry Potter), a centaur in the Harry Potter series
- Bane (The Matrix), a character in the Matrix film trilogy
- Bane the Druid, a Guardian in the Legacy of Kain franchise
- Darth Bane, a Sith Lord from the Star Wars franchise
- Cad Bane, famous bounty hunter from the Star Wars franchise
- The Bane, a character in The Underland Chronicles novel series
- Bane, a character in Ten Gentlemen from West Point (1942)

== Music ==
- Bane (band), a hardcore punk band formed in 1995
- Bane, a Joey Arkenstat album produced in 2004 by Mike Gordon
- "Bane", a song by D12 from Shady XV, 2014
- "Bane", a song by alt-J from The Dream, 2022

== Places ==
=== Africa ===
- Bane, Nigeria, a village in Nigeria
- Bané Department, one of the 13 departments of the Boulgou Province of Burkina Faso
  - Bané, a town in the Bané Department

=== Asia ===
- Bane, Iran, a city in Kurdistan Province
- Bane, Lebanon, a village in Bsharri District

=== Elsewhere ===
- Bane, West Virginia, an unincorporated community in the United States
- Bane, Velike Lašče, a village in the Municipality of Velike Lašče, southern Slovenia

== Other uses ==
- Bane (plant), an element in the common names of several species of plants, referring to their poisonous nature, whether actual or imagined
- "Bane" (Batman: The Animated Series), an episode of the television series Batman: The Animated Series
- "Bane" (Stargate SG-1), an episode of the television series Stargate SG-1
- Bane people, a Central African ethnicity

== People with the name ==
=== Given name or nickname ===
- Bane (Serbo-Croatian: [bǎːne]), a nickname for the Slavic given names Branislav and less commonly Branimir
- Bane Jelic (born 1967), Serbian musician, painter, and writer
- Branislav Kerac (born 1952), Serbian comic book creator
- Branislav Prelević (born 1966), Serbian basketball player
- Branislav Sekulić (1906 – 1968), Serbian football player
- Branislav Trifunović (born 1978), Serbian actor and film producer
- Bane Vasic, American engineer

=== Surname ===
- Charles A. Bane (1913 – 1998), American lawyer and civil rights activist
- Charles Bane Jr. (born 1951), American poet
- Cormac Bane, Irish football player
- Desmond Bane (born 1998), American basketball player
- Eddie Bane (born 1952), American baseball player
- Honey Bane (born 1964), English singer and actress
- Howard Bane (1927-2007), American intelligence officer
- James Bane (died 1332), Bishop of St. Andrews
- Jonas Bane (born 1987), Swedish actor
- Jonathan Bane (born 1991), American football player
- Margaret Bane (1542 – 1597), Scottish midwife and alleged witch
- Mary Jo Bane, American political scientist
- Sidi Bane (born 2004), Senegalese footballer
- Tom Bane (1913 – 1999), American politician
- William Patterson Bane (1843 – 1912), American soldier, claimed to be the tallest one to have fought in the American Civil War

== See also ==
- Baneh, Iran
- Bain (disambiguation)
- Baine (disambiguation)
