= Bains =

Bains may refer to:

== Places ==
- Bains, Haute-Loire, a commune in France
- Bains, Louisiana, US, an unincorporated area in West Feliciana parish

== People ==
- Arshdeep Bains (born 2001), Indian-Canadian ice hockey player
- Harcharan Bains, Indian politician
- Hardial Bains (1939-1997), Indian-Canadian communist activist
- Harjot Singh Bains (born 1990), Indian politician, minister in Punjab Government
- Harmilan Bains (born 1998), Indian athlete
- Harry Bains, Indian-Canadian politician, Minister of Labour of British Columbia
- Jasmeet Bains, Indian-American politician
- Naiktha Bains (born 1997), Australian-British tennis player
- Navdeep Bains (born 1977), Indian-Canadian politician, Minister of Innovation, Science and Industry and Registrar General of Canada
- Parm Bains, Indian-Canadian politician, MP for Richmond East–Steveston
- Peter Bance, British Sikh historian
- Rikki Bains (born 1988), British-Indian footballer
- Sat Bains (born 1971), British-Indian chef and restaurateur
- Simarjit Singh Bains, Indian politician, former MLA and founder of Lok Insaaf Party

== See also ==
- Les-bains (disambiguation)
- Bain (disambiguation)
- Baine (disambiguation)
- Baines, a surname
- Banes (disambiguation)
- Bain's Cape Mountain Whisky, a South African brand of whisky
- Bains Rajput, an Indian Rajput clan
