= Baines =

Baines is a surname of English, Scottish or Welsh origin. It shares many of the same roots with the British surname Bains. It shares some roots with the British surname Bain.

== Derivation and variants ==
Baines has a number of different sources, several of them nicknames and another based on an occupation. In Scotland and the north of England the Old English word bān ('bone') became Middle English bān and bain. It may have become a nickname in the plural, meaning 'bones' or '[long-]legs' (cf. modern German Bein, also meaning both "bone" and "leg"). The Middle English bayn, beyn and the Old Norse beinn meant 'straight' or 'direct', which may have become a nickname. The Middle English bayne (and French bain) meant 'bath'. This may have become an occupational surname for an attendant at a public bath.

Baines may also have Welsh roots, from the patronymic ab Einws ('son of Einws'). Einws is a shortened version of the Welsh name Ennion, meaning 'Anvil'.

Variants of the surname Baines include Bains, Banes, Baynes and Bayns.

== Frequency of occurrence ==
At the time of the British Census of 1881, its relative frequency was highest in Rutland (31.2 times the British average), followed by Westmorland, Lincolnshire, Yorkshire, Leicestershire, Lancashire, Nottinghamshire, Montgomeryshire and Bedfordshire.

Hanks and Hodges suggest in their "A Dictionary of Surnames" that many present day Baines descend from Robert Baines of Ipswich, Suffolk, England (born c. 1587). John Baines, Liverpool, England, Doctor of Physics.

== Notable people with the surname Baines ==
(In alphabetical order)

- Ajay Baines (born 1978), Canadian ice hockey player
- Andrew Baines (born 1963), Australian artist
- Anthony Baines (1912–1997), English musicologist
- Charlie Baines (1896–1954), English footballer
- Chris Baines (born 1947), English gardener, naturalist, television presenter and author
- Edward Baines (1774–1848), English newspaper-proprietor and politician
- Edward Baines (1800–1890), English newspaper editor and politician, son of the above
- Frank Baines (1877–1933), English architect
- James Baines (draper) (1648–1717), English draper
- James Baines (merchant) (1822–1889), English merchant
- Lewis Baines (born 1998), English footballer
- Francis Baines (1648–1710), English Jesuit
- Sir George Grenfell-Baines (1908–2003), English architect
- George Washington Baines (1809–1882), American politician, journalist
- Harold Baines (born 1959), baseball player
- Jervoise Athelstane Baines (1847–1925), census commissioner in British India
- John Baines (born 1946), British Egyptologist
- Joseph Wilson Baines (1846–1906), American politician from Texas
- Kate Baines (born 1978), English actress
- Leighton Baines (born 1984) English footballer
- Matthew Talbot Baines (1799–1860), British lawyer and politician
- Michael Baines (1898–1990), English cricketer and British Army officer
- Nicholas M. Baines (born 1978), English keyboard player, Kaiser Chiefs
- Nick Baines (bishop) (born 1957), Bishop of Croydon
- Paul Baines (academic) (born 1973), British marketing academic
- Paul Baines (footballer) (born 1972), former English footballer
- Peter Augustine Baines (1787–1843), English Benedictine
- Richard Baines, English historical figure, informant against Christopher Marlowe
- Robert A. Baines (1946–2026), American politician from New Hampshire
- Steve Baines (born 1954), English footballer
- Thomas Baines (1820–1875), English artist and explorer
- Thomas Baines (Ontario) (1799–1867), Canadian crown land agent
- William Baines (1899–1922), English pianist and composer

== Distribution ==
As a surname, Baines is the 1,732nd most common surname in Great Britain, with 6,209 bearers. It is most common in Lancashire, where it is the 626th most common surname, with 1,784 bearers. Other concentrations include, Swansea, (88th,1,704), City of Leeds, (167th,1,722), and West Yorkshire, (380th, 1,702).

== See also ==
- Lyndon Baines Johnson
- Bain (disambiguation)
- Baine (disambiguation)
- Bains (disambiguation)
- Banes (disambiguation)
- Baynes, a surname
