= Bain =

Bain may refer to:

== People ==
- Bain (surname), origin and list of people with the surname
- Bain (singer), Korean K-pop singer, first openly gay member of a K-pop idol group
- Bain of Tulloch, Scottish family
- Bain Stewart, Australian film producer, husband of Leah Purcell
- Saint Bain (died c. 711 AD), Bishop of Thérouanne, Abbot of Saint Wandrille

== Fictional characters ==
- Bain (The Wheel of Time), character from the novels by Robert Jordan
- Sunset Bain, a Marvel Comics character
- Sheriff Joe Bain, a character in the work of Jack Vance
- Marlon Bain, in the 1996 novel Infinite Jest by David Foster Wallace
- Miguel Bain, a character in the film Assassins
- Noah Bain, a character in the TV Series It Takes a Thief
- Bain, a character from the video game Payday 2
- Campbell Bain, a character in the TV drama Takin' Over the Asylum

== Companies ==
- Bain & Company, a global management consulting firm
- Bain Capital, a private equity group co-founded by Mitt Romney

== Places ==
- Bain, Alberta, Canada
- Bain, Iran
- River Bain, Lincolnshire, England
- River Bain, North Yorkshire, England

== Other uses ==
- Le Bain, a painting by Édouard Manet
- Pegas Bain, a Czech paraglider design

== See also ==
- Bane (disambiguation)
- Baine (disambiguation)
- Bains (disambiguation)
- Baines
- Bein
