= Charles Bane =

Charles Bane may refer to:

- Charles A. Bane (1913–1998), American lawyer and civil rights activist
- Charles Bane Jr. (born 1951), American poet
