= Baynes =

Baynes is a surname. Notable people with the surname include:

- Adam Baynes, English politician
- Aron Baynes (born 1986), New Zealand-born Australian basketball player
- Ernest Harold Baynes (1868-1925), American naturalist and writer
- Louise Birt Baynes (1876-1958), American naturalist and photographer
- Helton Godwin Baynes, (1882–1943), analytical psychologist, author, translator of Carl Jung
- James Baynes (1766–1837), English painter
- Norman Hepburn Baynes (1877–1961), British historian of the Byzantine Empire
- Pauline Baynes (1922–2008), English illustrator
- Robert Lambert Baynes (1796–1869), British naval officer
- Simon Baynes, British politician
- Stephen Baynes (born 1956), Australian dancer
- Sydney Baynes (1879–1938), British conductor and composer
- Thomas Mann Baynes (1794–1876), English artist, son of James Baynes
- Thomas Spencer Baynes (1823–1887), English philosopher

Fictional characters:

- Inspector Baynes, from the Sherlock Holmes story The Adventure of Wisteria Lodge

== See also ==
- Baynes Island, Tasmania, Australia
- Baynes Sound, British Columbia, Canada
- Bayne's, Scottish bakery company
- Baines
