= Olgica =

Olgica is a feminine given name. Notable people with the name include:

== People ==
- Olgica Bakajin, American scientist
- Olgica Batić (born 1981), Serbian lawyer and politician
- Olgica Milenkovic, Serbian engineer

== Fictional characters ==
- Olgica, one of the main characters in the 2012 Croatian movie Night Boats
