= Baine =

Baine may refer to:

- Baine Harbour (2006 population: 134), Canadian community in the province of Newfoundland and Labrador
- The baïne, a geographical phenomenon unique to the Aquitaine coast of France
- Baine Kerr (1919–2008), American lawyer
- James Baine (1710–1790), a minister of the second great secession from the Church of Scotland
- Baine Building, in Hollywood, California

== See also ==
- Bain (disambiguation)
- Bane (disambiguation)
- Baines
- Baynes
- Bains (disambiguation)
