= Olgica Milenkovic =

Olgica Milenkovic is a coding theorist from the former Yugoslavia, known for her work in compressed sensing, low-density parity-check codes, and DNA digital data storage. She is a professor of electrical and computer engineering at the University of Illinois at Urbana–Champaign.

== Education and career ==
Milenkovic graduated from the University of Niš in 1996, with a bachelor's degree in electrical engineering. She wrote a bachelor's thesis on Channel Capacity of a New Class of Modulation Codes, supervised by Bane Vasic. She moved to the University of Michigan for her graduate studies, continuing to work with Vasic there on a 2001 master's thesis, Multidimensional Modulation Codes for Magnetic and Optical Recording. She completed her Ph.D. at Michigan in 2002, with a dissertation Combinatorial Problems in Analysis of Algorithms and Coding Theory supervised by Kevin Compton.

After her completing her doctorate, Milenkovic joined the department of electrical and computer engineering at the University of Colorado Boulder. She moved to the University of Illinois at Urbana–Champaign in 2007, and was promoted to full professor there in 2015.

In 2019, she served as Guest Editor in chief of a special project dedicated to interdisplinary work of V.I Levenshtein.

== Contributions ==
Milenkovic's research includes using DNA to store and retrieve content such as Wikipedia articles and the Gettysburg Address.

== Awards ==
- NSF Faculty Early Career Development (CAREER) Award
- The DARPA Young Faculty Award
- The Dean's Excellence in Research Award

== Recognition ==
Milenkovic was a distinguished lecturer for the IEEE Information Theory Society in 2015. In 2018 she was elected as a Fellow of the IEEE "for contributions to genomic data compression".
