= Hôtel de Ville, Thonon-les-Bains =

Town hall in Thonon-les-Bains, France

Hôtel de Ville
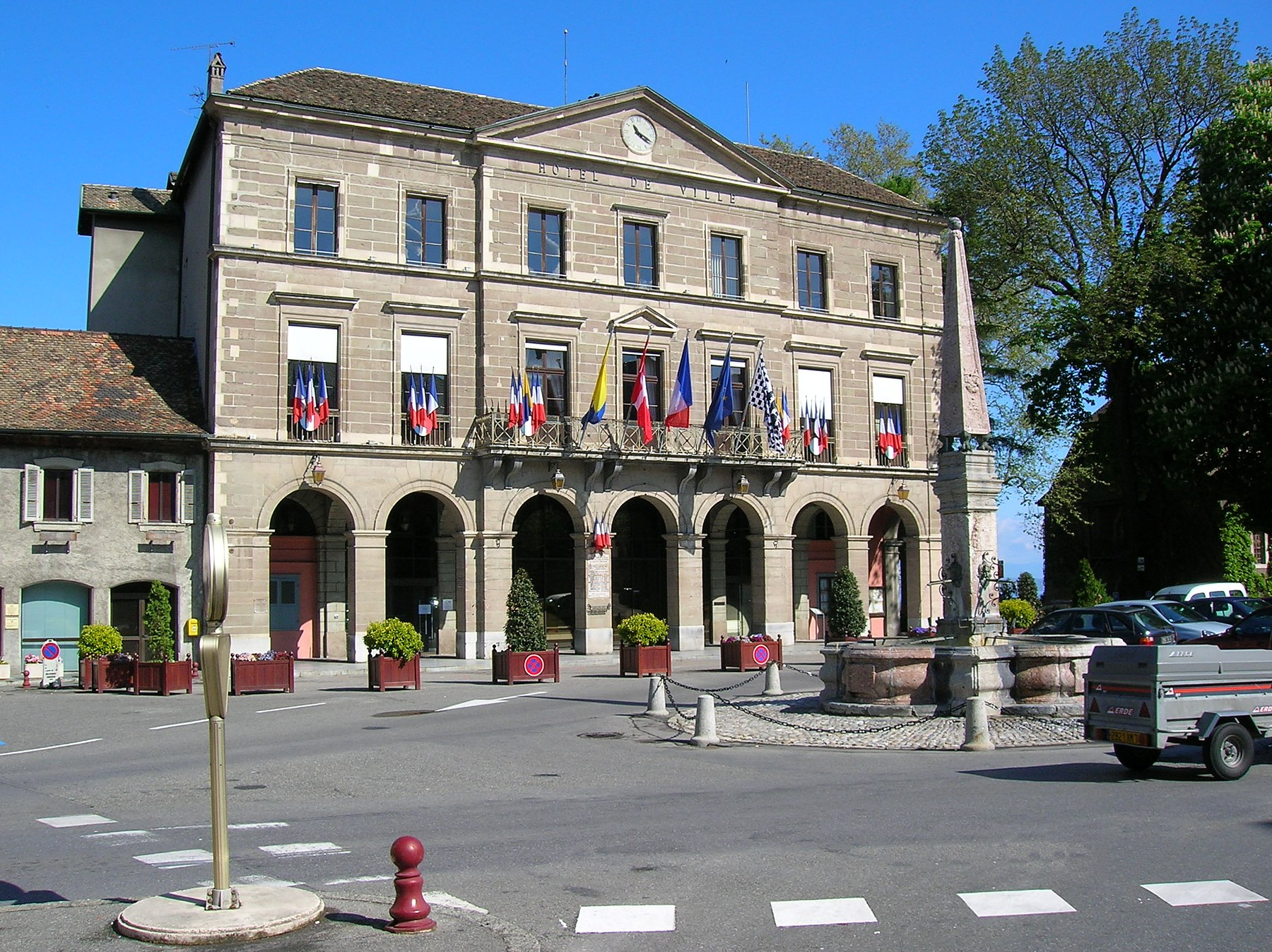
- The main frontage of the Hôtel de Ville in May 2005

General information
- Type: City hall
- Architectural style: Neoclassical style
- Location: Thonon-les-Bains, France
- Coordinates: 46.3733°N 6.4778°E
- Completed: 1831

Design and construction
- Architects: Joseph Mazzone and Louis Perregaud

Monument historique
- Official name: Hôtel de ville
- Type: Inscrit
- Designated: 1972
- Reference no.: PA00118461

The Hôtel de Ville (French pronunciation: [otɛl də vil], City Hall) is a municipal building in Thonon-les-Bains, Haute-Savoie, in eastern France, standing on Place de l'Hôtel de Ville. It was designated a monument historique by the French government in 1972.

== History ==
The first town hall was commissioned by the Bernese authorities who administered the area in the mid-16th century. The ground floor was used as a warehouse and the first floor was used as an assembly room. After the town was returned to the Duchy of Savoy in 1567, the new civic leaders met in the assembly room on the first floor. A marble fountain, sculpted in the form of an obelisk at the centre of a quatrefoil-shaped basin, was installed in front of the building in 1737.

Savoy was annexed by the French First Republic in 1792, but much of it was then restored to the Kingdom of Sardinia during the First Restoration of 1814. By that time, the building had become dilapidated and was being used as accommodation for Sardinian troops. The building was badly damaged in a major fire, probably caused by the Sardinian troops billeted there, in 1815. Work began on rebuilding the town hall in 1821. It was designed Joseph Mazzone, with detailing by Louis Perregaud, in the neoclassical style, built in ashlar stone and was completed around 1831.

The design involved a symmetrical main frontage of seven bays facing onto the street. The ground floor was arcaded with seven round headed openings formed by square columns, imposts and voussoirs. The first and second floors were fenestrated by casement windows. The central section of three bays, which was slightly projected forward, was fronted by an iron balcony on the first floor. On the first floor, the central window was surmounted by a pediment while the others were surmounted by cornices. On the second floor, the central window was surmounted by a cornice. At roof level, there was a pediment across the central section with a clock in the tympanum. Internally, the principal room was the Salle du Conseil (council chamber).

The town hall remained an important administrative centre after Savoy was annexed by France, under the Treaty of Turin in 1860. During the First World War, the town stood firm with France, notwithstanding its historical connections with Switzerland and Italy. In October 1921, after the town was awarded the Silver Medal of French Gratitude for its patriotism during the war, a plaque was installed in one of the openings on the ground floor to commemorate the honour.

After the liberation of the town by the French Resistance on 17 August 1944, another plaque was installed in one of the openings to recognise the gratitude of the people who had been evacuated from the French regions of Alsace and Lorraine and had found refuge in the town during the Second World War. In November 1948, after the town was awarded the Croix de Guerre with silver star in recognition of its role hosting various French Resistance organisations during the war, a third plaque commemorating the lives of French Resistance fighters who had died, was installed on the face of the town hall.

After court hearings were transferred to the Château de Bellegarde, the building was extensively renovated, under the management of Maurice Novarina, in the 1960s.
