= Just B =

South Korean boy band

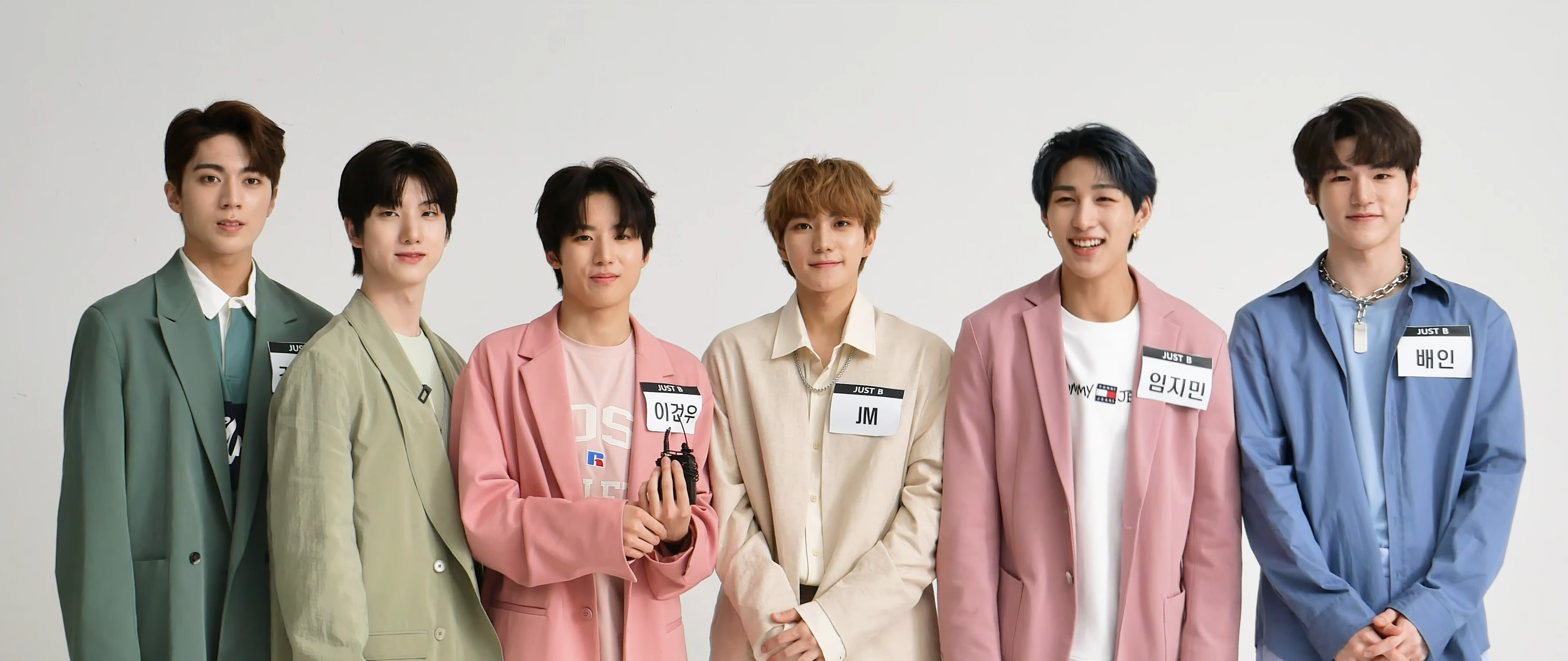
- Just B in November 2021; L–R: Sangwoo, DY, Geonu, Siwoo, Lim Ji-min, Bain

Background information
- Origin: Seoul, South Korea
- Genre: K-pop
- Years active: 2021–present
- Label: Bluedot
- Members: Geonu; Bain; Lim Ji-min; Siwoo; DY; Sangwoo

Just B (Korean: 저스트비) is a South Korean boy band formed by Bluedot Entertainment. The group consists of six members: Geonu, Bain, Lim Ji-min, Siwoo (formerly known as JM), DY, and Sangwoo.

== History ==
=== 2019–2020: Pre-debut activities ===
DY and Bain were former contestants on MBC's survival show Under Nineteen. DY won first place and made his debut as the center of 1the9 while Bain was eliminated in the final episode.

Lim Ji-min was a former contestant on SBS' The Fan, but was eliminated. He made his solo debut with his single album Mini.

Geonu and Siwoo were former contestants on Mnet's survival show I-Land. Siwoo was eliminated in the first part, while Geonu was eliminated in the second part of episode 8.

=== 2021–2022: Debut and early years ===
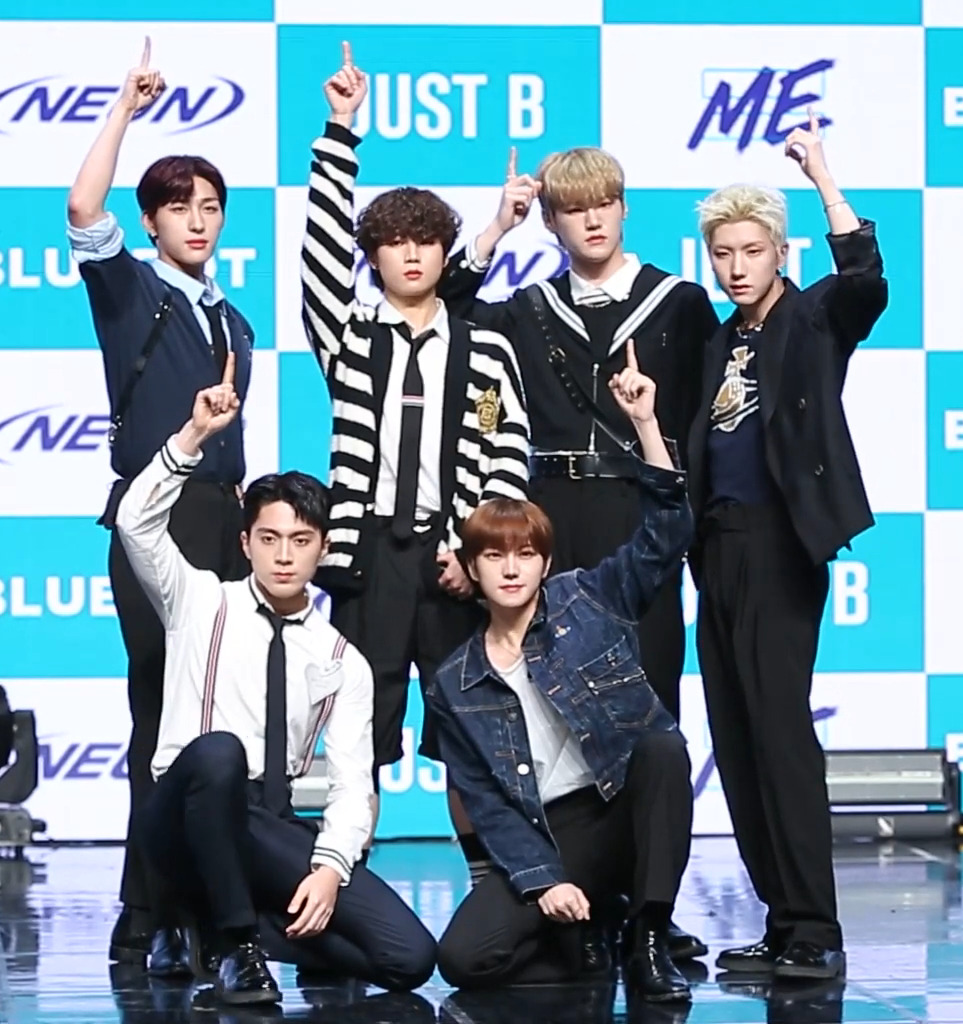
Just B in 2022

On June 30, Just B officially debuted with the release of their first extended play Just Burn and the lead single "Damage" was produced by Bang Yong-guk, a singer, rapper, songwriter and producer who was the leader of the boy group B.A.P.

On October 27, Just B returned with their first single album Just Beat and its lead single "Tick Tock".

On April 14, 2022, Just B released their second extended play Just Begun and its lead single "Re=load".

They released their third extended play = (Neun) and its lead single "Me=" on November 16, 2022.

=== 2023–2024: JUST Be with you , ÷ (Nanugi), formation of The CrewOne ===
On February 14, 2023, Just B released their first collaboration project with soloist AleXa titled "MBTI".

On April 12, 2023, Just B released their pre-release single "얼어있는 길거리에 잠시라도 따듯한 햇빛이 내리길" (Camelia) with lyrics penned by members DY and Sangwoo and composed by DY. Their fourth EP, ÷ (Nanugi), was released on October 9. The EP contains six tracks with the lead single "Medusa".

On June 27, 2024, the group collaborated with ATBO to form the project boy group The CrewOne. The project group then joined Mnet's competition program Road to Kingdom: Ace of Ace, which premiered on September 19, 2024. On November 29, IST Entertainment announced that The CrewOne's collaborative promotions would come to an end and the group disbanded.

=== 2024–2025: Daddy's Girl, Still I Luv You, " , JUST ODD, Too Late, Snow Angel ===
In 2024 and 2025, Just B released a series of singles, starting with "Daddy's Girl", released on May 22, 2024, following the group's Just Be With You Tour, during which the song was performed for the first time.

On January 5, 2025, Just B released the single "Still I Luv You" and the following month, they released a two-song EP titled ", which featured the songs "한걸음만" and "Hoodie."

On March 28, 2025, Just B released an EP titled JUST ODD, featuring the lead single, "CHEST." This release was followed by the JUST ODD Tour, which came to parts of Asia and North America.

On August 24, 2025, Just B released a single titled "Too Late."

On October 18 and 25, 2025, Just B made an appearance on episode 3 & 4 of Show It All Vietnam, acting as a performer to battle against the group of shortlisted contestants.

Just B released their 5th mini album Snow Angel on November 7, 2025. The first single, "Going South", was pre-released on October 24, 2025. The album was funded in collaboration with the group's fans as part of a crowdfunding campaign. Just B will embark on a Listening Tour across America in support of the album.

== Members ==
Adapted from their Naver profile and official website.

- Geonu (건우)
- Bain (배인)
- Lim Ji-min (임지민)
- Siwoo (추시우)
- DY (전도염)
- Sangwoo (상우)

=== Personal lives of members ===
Bain came out in April 2025, saying, “I’m proud to be a part of the LGBTQ+ community — as a gay person.” This made him one of the first active male K-pop idols to publicly come out as gay after Holland.

== Discography ==
=== Extended plays ===
Title	EP details	Peak chart positions	Sales
Title	EP details	KOR	Sales
Just Burn	Released: June 30, 2021; Label: Bluedot Entertainment; Formats: CD, digital download, streaming audio; Track listing: 1. "Get Away"; 2. "Damage"; 3. "On My Way"; 4. "Double Dare"; 5. "Deja Vu"	17	KOR: 21,605
Just Begun	Released: April 14, 2022; Label: Bluedot Entertainment; Formats: CD, digital download, streaming audio; Track listing: 1. "Dash!"; 2. "Reload"; 3. "Make It New"; 4. "Don't Go Back"; 5. "Lights On"	11	KOR: 53,030
= (Neun)	Released: November 16, 2022; Label: Bluedot Entertainment; Formats: CD, digital download, streaming audio; Track listing: 1. "Domino"; 2. "Ready or Not"; 3. "Me" (나는); 4. "Cherry on Top"; 5. "Night Air" (밤공기)	7	KOR: 53,767
÷ (Nanugi)	Released: October 9, 2023; Label: Bluedot Entertainment; Formats: CD, digital download, streaming audio; Track listing: 1. "Drama"; 2. "Medusa"; 3. "Paper Plane"; 4. "Youth"; 5. "Coming Home"; 6. "Camellia"; 7. "Coming Home" (Acoustic English version, Digital Only)	21	KOR: 20,912
Snow Angel	Released: November 7, 2025; Label: Bluedot Entertainment; Formats: Digital download, streaming audio; Track listing: 1. "Sweater"; 2. "Snow Angel"; 3. "True Heart"; 4. "Freedom"; 5. "Going South"; 6. "BHYT (Baby Hold You Tight)	32	KOR: 4,606

=== Single albums ===
Title	Album details	Peak chart positions	Sales
Title	Album details	KOR	Sales
Just Beat	Released: October 27, 2021; Label: Bluedot Entertainment; Formats: CD, digital download, streaming audio; Track listing: 1. "Tick Tock"; 2. "Vindicated"; 3. "Try"	9	KOR: 28,221
JUST Be with you Pt. 1	Released: February 14, 2023; Label: Bluedot Entertainment; Formats: digital download, streaming audio; Track listing: 1. "MBTI"; 2. "MBTI - Instrumental"	—N/a	

=== Singles ===
List of singles
Title	Year	Album
"Damage"	2021	Just Burn
"Tick Tock"	2021	Just Beat
"Re=load"	2022	Just Begun
"Me=" (나는)	2022	= (Neun)
"MBTI" (feat. AleXa)	2023	Just B with You Pt. 1
"Camellia"	2023	Camellia
"Medusa"	2023	÷ (Nanugi)
"Daddy's Girl"	2024	Non-album singles
"Chest"	2025	Just Odd
"Going South"	2025	Snow Angel
"True Heart"	2025	Snow Angel

== Videography ==
=== Music videos ===
List of music videos, showing year released and directors
Title	Year	Director(s)	Ref.
"Damage"	2021	Jimmy (VIA)	
"Tick Tock"	2021	Jimmy (VIA)	
"Try"	2021	Jimmy (VIA)	
"Re=load"	2022	Jimmy (VIA)	
"Me="	2022	Jimmy (VIA)	
"MBTI"	2023	Zanybros	
"Camelia"	2023		

== Awards and nominations ==
Name of the award ceremony, year presented, award category, nominee(s) of the award, and the result of the nomination
Award ceremony	Year	Category	Nominee(s)/ Work(s)	Result	Ref.
Asia Artist Awards	2021	Male Idol Group Popularity Award	Just B	Nominated	
Hanteo Music Awards	2021	Rookie Award – Male Group	Just B	Nominated	
Hanteo Music Awards	2023	Blooming Star Award	Just B	Won	
Hanteo Music Awards	2024	Blooming Star Award	Just B	Won	
Korea Model Awards	2022	Rising Star Award	Just B	Won	
