= Bein =

Bein (German for leg) is a German and Yiddish surname and may refer to:

== People ==
- Alex Bein (1903–1988), Jewish scholar
- Kazimierz Bein (1872–1959), Polish ophthalmologist, the founder and sometime director of the Warsaw Ophthalmic Institute
- Uwe Bein (born 1960), German footballer

== Others ==
- beIN Media Group
- beIN Network, a Pay TV Network
- beIN Sports, a satellite TV channels

== See also ==
- Bain
