= Les Bains Des Docks =

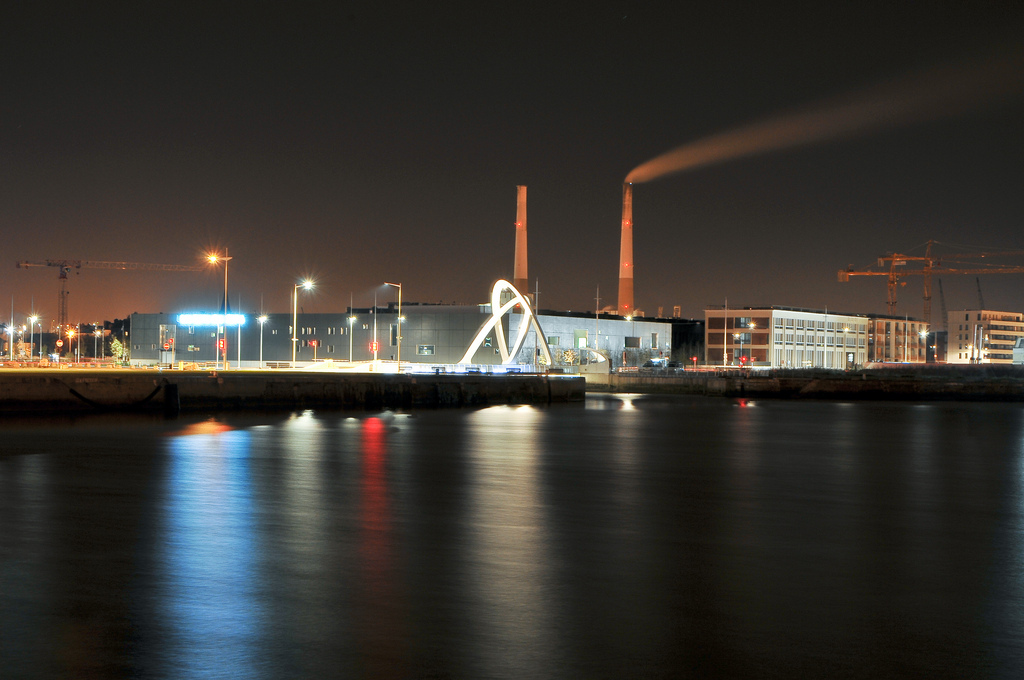
- View of the building at night from across the water.
- Interactive map of the Les Bains Des Docks area

General information
- Type: Aquatic Complex
- Location: Le Havre, France, Quai de la réunion 76600 Le Havre
- Coordinates: 49°29′13.50″N 0°7′37.50″E
- Completed: July 17, 2008
- Cost: 16 000 000 €
- Client: Mairie du Havre, CODAH

Technical details
- Floor area: 12000 m2

Design and construction
- Architects: Partner in charge Mirco Tardio; Project architect design Julie Fernandez; Project architect construction Felix Medina
- Architecture firm: Ateliers Jean Nouvel
- Structural engineer: Sero Le Havre
- Other designers: Lighting; AIK Yann Kersalé; Acoustics; Avel

Les Bains Des Docks (The Bath by the docks) is an Aquatic Center in the city of Le Havre, France. It was designed by award winning architectural firm Ateliers Jean Nouvel as part of an effort by Le Havre to revitalize its docks and warehouse district.

== About ==
The overall design was inspired by the Roman thermal baths as people can go to congregate in most of the various pools year round. The simple exterior of the building is a precast concrete painted black with a grey base and random windows of varying sizes. Inside there are of over 6 indoor and outdoor pools in different areas including an Olympic sized lap pool and children's play area. Most of the interior consists of straight, boxy designs painted in white with the exception of a children's play area which is multicolored. Several of the indoor pools are at varying levels and waterfalls give a natural division to the different spaces. Large skylights and exterior windows bring in natural light throughout.

The building was featured in the August 2009 issue of Architectural Record.
