= Bain, Alberta =

Coordinates: 49.28333°N 110.40157°W

Bain is a locality in Alberta, Canada.

Bain has the name of James Bain, a railroad official.
