= Francis Baines (Jesuit) =

Francis Baines (1648–1710) was an English Jesuit.

== Biography ==
Baines was born in Worcestershire in 1648, pursued his humanity studies in the college at St. Omer, and went through his higher course in the English College, Rome, which he entered as a convictor or boarder on 6 November 1667. He took the college oath on 27 January 1668, and was ordained as a secular priest on 16 April 1672. He was admitted into the Society of Jesus at Rome, by the father-general, Oliva, on 4 January 1673–1674, and left for Watten to make his noviceship on 5 April or 4 June 1674. He was professed of the four vows on 15 August 1684. A catalogue of the members of the society, drawn up in 1693, states that he took the degree of D.D. at Cologne, and had been prefect of studies and vice-rector of the college at Liège, and of the "College of St. Ignatius, London." He was appointed confessor to the exiled king, James II, at Saint-Germain, and attended that monarch during his last illness. He died at Saint-Germain on 19 February 1709–1710.

The jesuit father, François Bretonneau, published ‘"Abrégé de la Vie de Jacques II, Roy de la Grande Bretagne, &c. Tiré d'un écrit Anglois du R. P. François Sanders, de la Compagnie de Jesus, Confesseur de Sa Majesté," Paris, 1703, 12mo. This appeared in English, under the title of: "An Abridgment of the Life of James II … extracted from an English Manuscript of the Reverend Father Francis Sanders … done out of French from the Paris edition," London, 1704. An Italian translation was published at Milan in 1703, and at Ferrara in 1704; and a Spanish translation, by Francesco de Medyana y Vargas, appeared at Cádiz in 1707, 4to.

Sanders translated from the French version "The Practice of Christian Perfection," by Father Alphonsus Rodriguez. This translation has been several times reprinted in England, Ireland, and the United States.
