= Harcharan Bains =

Indian politician

Harcharan Singh Bains
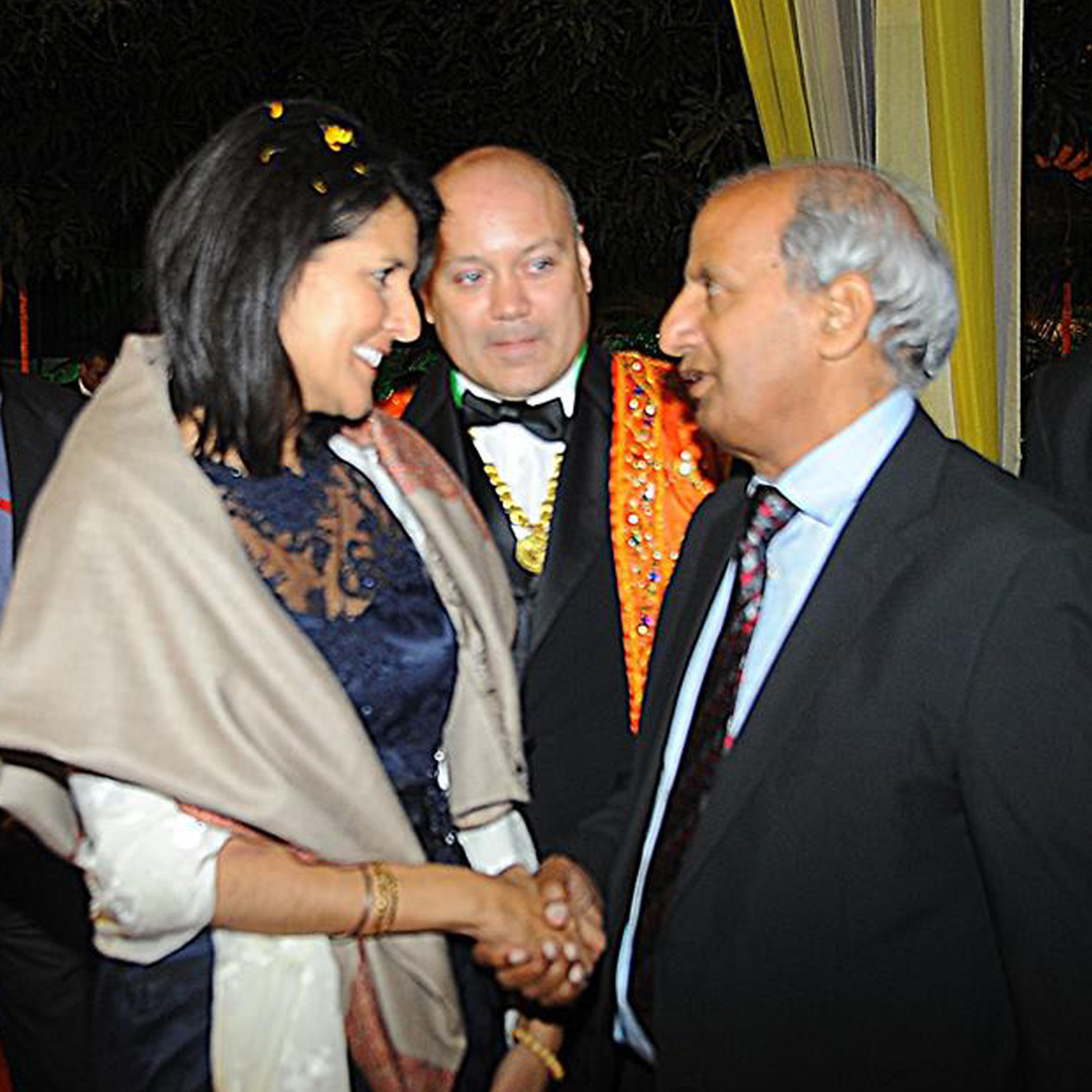
- Harcharan Bains with Nikki Haley in Chandigarh

Advisor (National Affairs & Media) to the Chief Minister of Punjab.

Personal details
- Born: Feb-15,1951 Mahilpur, Hoshiarpur, Punjab
- Party: SAD
- Children: 1 son

Harcharan Bains is a freelance journalist, political ideologue, writer and former TV sports commentator. Bains is the General Secretary of India's oldest regional political party Shiromani Akali Dal (Badal). Bains was advisor to Chief Minister of Punjab Parkash Singh Badal on national affairs and media.

Bains has written on Punjab and Sikh politics, and has been adviser to two chief ministers - Surjit Singh Barnala (1985–1987) and Badal (since 1997). He was an assistant professor of English literature at Punjab Agricultural University, Ludhiana, when Barnala made him an advisor.
