= Thonon-les-Bains =

Subprefecture of Haute-Savoie, Auvergne-Rhône-Alpes, France

Thonon-les-Bains Tonon (Savoyard) Tonone (Italian)
- Subprefecture and commune
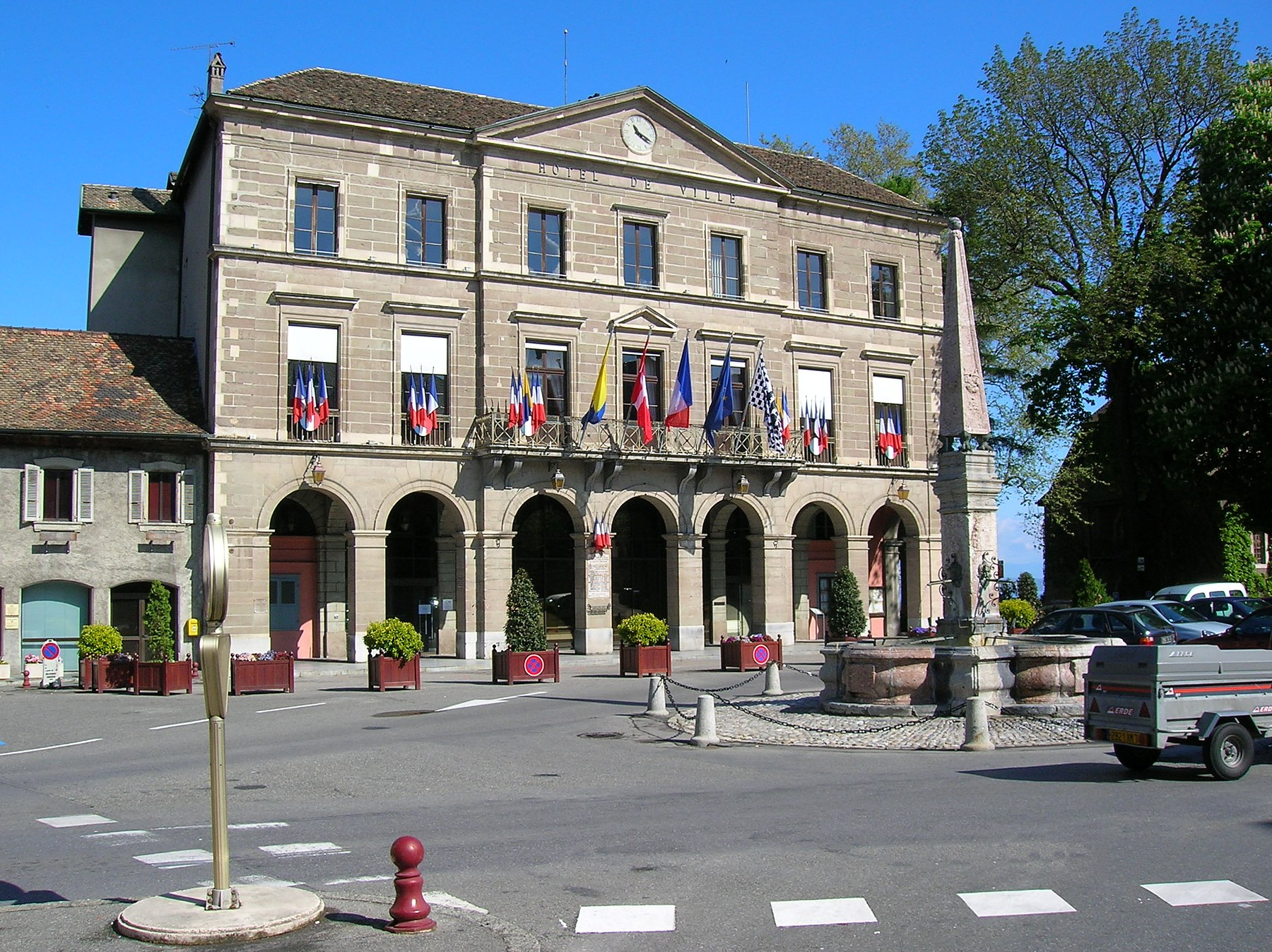
- The Hôtel de Ville

- Flag Coat of arms
- Location of Thonon-les-Bains
- Location within France Location within Auvergne-Rhône-Alpes
- Coordinates: 46°21′46″N 6°28′30″E
- Country: France
- Region: Auvergne-Rhône-Alpes
- Department: Haute-Savoie
- Arrondissement: Thonon-les-Bains
- Canton: Thonon-les-Bains
- Intercommunality: Thonon Agglomération

Government
  - Mayor (2020–2026): Christophe Arminjon
- Area^{1}: 16.21 km^{2} (6.26 sq mi)
- Elevation: 425 m (1,394 ft)
- Highest elevation: 569 m (1,867 ft)
- Lowest elevation: 371 m (1,217 ft)
- Population (2023): 37,928
  - Density: 2,340/km^{2} (6,060/sq mi)
- Demonym: Thononais
- Time zone: UTC+01:00 (CET)
  - Summer (DST): UTC+02:00 (CEST)
- INSEE/Postal code: 74281 /74200
- Website: www.ville-thonon.fr
- ^{1} French Land Register data, which excludes lakes, ponds, glaciers > 1 km^{2} (0.386 sq mi or 247 acres) and river estuaries.

Thonon-les-Bains (French pronunciation: [tɔnɔ̃ le bɛ̃]; Savoyard: Tonon; Italian: Tonone; lit. 'Thonon-the-Baths'), or simply Thonon, is a subprefecture of the Haute-Savoie department in the Auvergne-Rhône-Alpes region in Eastern France. Thonon-les-Bains is part of a transborder metropolitan area known as Grand Genève. It is situated on the shores of Lake Geneva (French: Lac Léman, or simply Le Léman).

== History ==
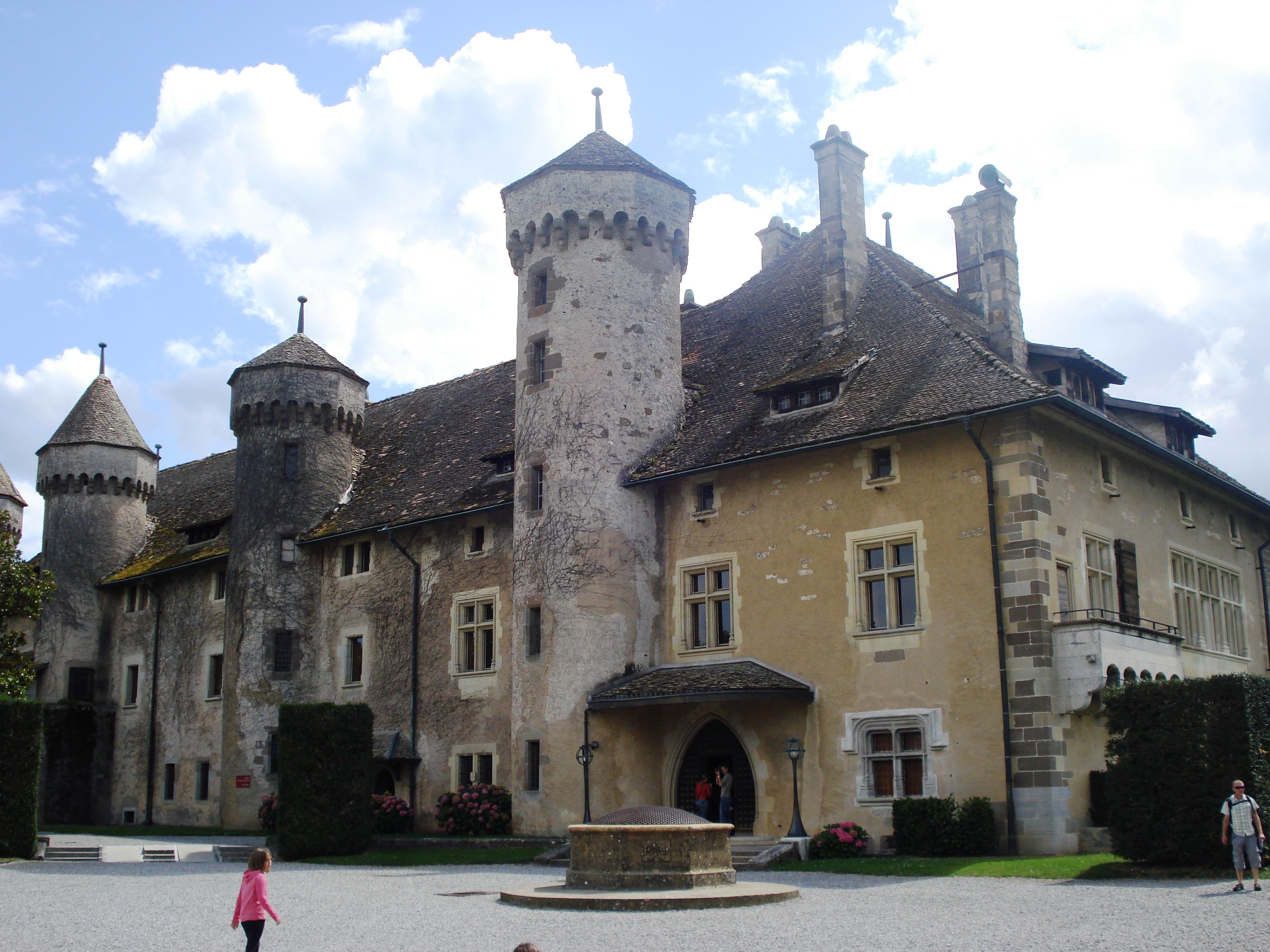
Château de Ripaille

Thonon-les-Bains was the historic capital of Chablais, a province of the old Duchy of Savoy. The Chablais Savoyard is the portion of Chablais in France. Chablais Valaisan and Chablais Vaudois are those portions of Chablais in the adjacent Switzerland cantons Valais and Vaud.(cite: Chablais Wikipedia) The town was the capital of the Dukedom of Chablais. The Hôtel de Ville was completed around 1831.

During the debates on the future of the Duchy of Savoy in 1860, the population was sensitive to the idea of a union of the northern part of the duchy with Switzerland. A petition circulated in this part of the country (Chablais, Faucigny, Northern Genevois), but it collected no more than 13,600 signatures. The duchy was reunited after a plebiscite organised on 22 and 23 April 1860 under Napoleon III, in which 99.8 percent of the Savoyards voting were reported to have answered "yes" to the question "Does Savoy want to be reunited to France?"

== Population ==
Historical population

Year	Pop.	±% p.a.
1793	3,010	—
1800	3,198	+0.87%
1806	3,251	+0.27%
1822	4,179	+1.58%
1838	4,428	+0.36%
1848	4,488	+0.13%
1858	4,825	+0.73%
1861	4,918	+0.64%
1866	5,530	+2.37%
1872	5,272	−0.79%
1876	5,501	+1.07%
1881	5,444	−0.21%
1886	5,447	+0.01%
1891	5,780	+1.19%
1896	5,666	−0.40%
1901	6,268	+2.04%
1906	7,043	+2.36%

Year	Pop.	±% p.a.
1911	7,232	+0.53%
1921	8,042	+1.07%
1926	10,270	+5.01%
1931	11,291	+1.91%
1936	12,183	+1.53%
1946	13,181	+0.79%
1954	14,016	+0.77%
1962	17,080	+2.50%
1968	20,700	+3.26%
1975	24,454	+2.41%
1982	24,844	+0.23%
1990	28,401	+1.69%
1999	28,927	+0.20%
2007	31,562	+1.10%
2012	34,661	+1.89%
2017	34,756	+0.05%
2023	37,928	+1.47%

Source: EHESS and INSEE (1968–2023)

== Transport ==
Thonon-les-Bains station has rail connections to Lyon, Évian-les-Bains, Annemasse and Geneva.

Local transport is assured by BUT (Bus urbains thononais). The lines are:

- Line A: Destination Grangette / Destination Multiplex
- Line B: Destination Z.I VONGY / Destination Place des arts
- Line C: Destination Collège Théodore Monod / Place des arts
- Line D: Destination Collège theodore Monod or Espace Leman / Place des arts
- Line L: Destination Amphion Village / Place des arts
- Line P: Destination Marin / Place des arts
- Line M: Destination La Chavanne / Place des arts
- Line N: Destination Parking des chateaux / Place des arts

Line H and J are used in Évian-Les-Bains, and not Thonon-Les-Bains.

The nearest airport is Geneva Airport which is located 40 km west of Thonon-les-Bains.

Thonon-les-Bains is also served by a short funicular.

== Main sights ==
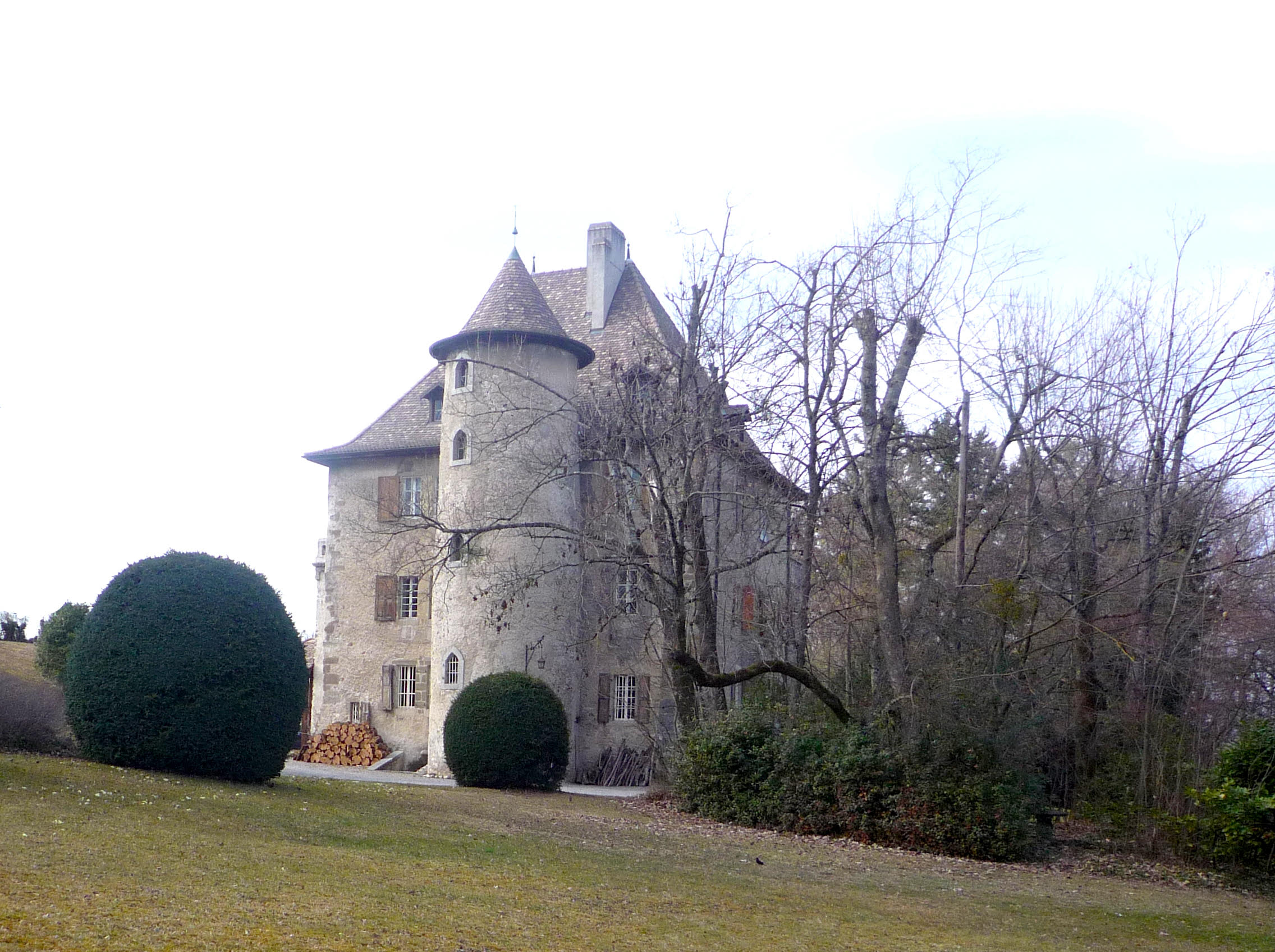
Château de Thuyset

- Arboretum de Ripaille
- Château des Guillet-Monthoux
- Château de Ripaille
- Château de Sonnaz
- Château de Thuyset
- Saint-Hippolyte church (12th century), rebuilt in Savoy Baroque-style during the 17th century
- Funiculaire de Thonon-les-Bains

== Twin towns – sister cities ==
Thonon-les-Bains is twinned with:

- Eberbach, Germany
- Mercer Island, United States
- Čačak, Serbia

== Climate ==
Climate data for Thonon-les-Bains (Évian-les-Bains), elevation 395 m (1,296 ft), (1991–2020 normals, extremes 1990–present)
Month	Jan	Feb	Mar	Apr	May	Jun	Jul	Aug	Sep	Oct	Nov	Dec	Year
Record high °C (°F)	18.0 (64.4)	20.8 (69.4)	22.0 (71.6)	25.5 (77.9)	31.4 (88.5)	34.5 (94.1)	36.0 (96.8)	36.9 (98.4)	30.0 (86.0)	26.3 (79.3)	19.5 (67.1)	17.5 (63.5)	36.9 (98.4)
Mean daily maximum °C (°F)	5.2 (41.4)	6.5 (43.7)	10.9 (51.6)	15.0 (59.0)	19.4 (66.9)	23.5 (74.3)	25.9 (78.6)	25.0 (77.0)	20.3 (68.5)	14.9 (58.8)	9.2 (48.6)	5.9 (42.6)	15.1 (59.2)
Daily mean °C (°F)	3.0 (37.4)	3.6 (38.5)	7.2 (45.0)	10.8 (51.4)	15.0 (59.0)	18.9 (66.0)	21.2 (70.2)	20.6 (69.1)	16.5 (61.7)	12.0 (53.6)	6.9 (44.4)	3.8 (38.8)	11.6 (52.9)
Mean daily minimum °C (°F)	0.8 (33.4)	0.8 (33.4)	3.6 (38.5)	6.5 (43.7)	10.6 (51.1)	14.4 (57.9)	16.6 (61.9)	16.3 (61.3)	12.7 (54.9)	9.1 (48.4)	4.6 (40.3)	1.7 (35.1)	8.1 (46.6)
Record low °C (°F)	−8.0 (17.6)	−10.9 (12.4)	−9.5 (14.9)	−3.5 (25.7)	1.0 (33.8)	6.1 (43.0)	9.4 (48.9)	9.0 (48.2)	5.0 (41.0)	−0.5 (31.1)	−4.5 (23.9)	−9.7 (14.5)	−10.9 (12.4)
Average precipitation mm (inches)	71.0 (2.80)	61.8 (2.43)	70.5 (2.78)	88.3 (3.48)	109.3 (4.30)	105.3 (4.15)	107.7 (4.24)	108.0 (4.25)	96.0 (3.78)	104.0 (4.09)	93.7 (3.69)	91.5 (3.60)	1,107.1 (43.59)
Average precipitation days (≥ 1.0 mm)	9.9	8.9	9.5	9.2	12.3	10.1	9.5	9.8	9.0	10.7	10.7	11.3	120.85
Source: Meteociel

== See also ==
- Communes of the Haute-Savoie department
