= Bain (singer) =

South Korean musician (born 2001)

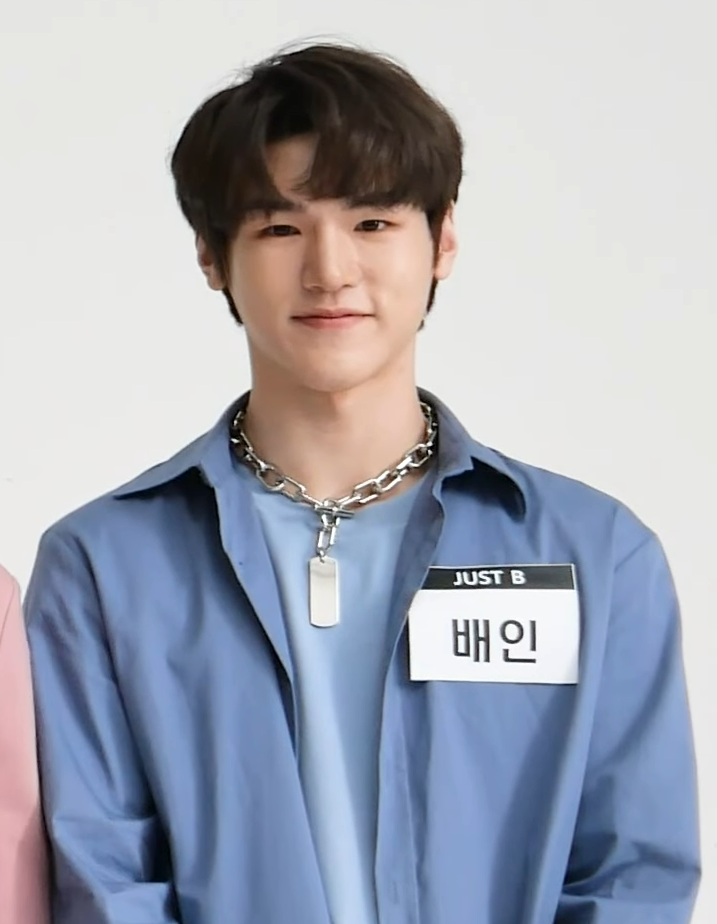
- Bain in 2021

Background information
- Born: Song Byeong-hee; 2001 (age 24–25)
- Genre: K-pop
- Occupation: Singer
- Label: Bluedot Entertainment

Song Byeong-hee (Korean: 송병희; born 2001), known professionally as Bain (배인), is a South Korean K-pop singer best known for being a member of idol group Just B, which he has been a part of since 2021. He made headlines when he came out as gay in 2025, becoming the first K-pop singer in an idol group to be openly gay.

== Biography ==
Byeong-hee was born in 2001. He realized he was gay at the age of 12, when he was in secondary school. He became a K-pop trainee shortly after finishing secondary school, which he has stated resulted in him having no choice but to hide being gay. He participated in Under Nineteen as a trainee, where he was eliminated in the final episode. He made his debut as part of Just B in 2021. He privately came out to his group and their label, Bluedot Entertainment, in 2023, after being asked by them whether he was gay. He appeared in Build Up: Vocal Boy Group Survival in 2024.

On 22 April 2025, Bain came out as gay during a performance of Just B in Los Angeles, saying: "I'm fucking proud to be a part of the LGBTQ community, as a gay person", singing a cover of Lady Gaga's "Born This Way", and waving a rainbow flag. During and after the concert, he received public support from his bandmates and his record label, as well as other notable LGBTQ+ figures in South Korea. He stated one of the reasons he had the courage to come out was Hong Seok-cheon.

This coming out was seen by many, including pop culture critic Jung Duk-hyun and LGBTQ+ rights activist Yi Ho-rim, as a sign that South Korean culture was possibly becoming more accepting of LGBTQ+ people. Byeong-hee has said that he was warned against coming out, but decided "society's changing" and that he "might gain more" than he would lose. Fans both within and outside of South Korea stated that this coming out encouraged them to keep going and inspired them. However, both he and his bandmates also received hate comments. He has remained an active member of Just B, and as of June 2026, is the first and only openly gay K-pop singer in an active K-pop group.
