= Charlie Baines =

English footballer (1896–1954)

Personal information
- Full name: Charles Edwin Baines
- Date of birth: 9 February 1896
- Place of birth: Ardsley, England
- Date of death: 1954 (aged 58–59)
- Position: Half-back

Senior career*
Years	Team	Apps	(Gls)
1919–1920	Ardsley Athletic		
1920–1931	Barnsley	322	(5)
Total		322	(5)
- * Club domestic league appearances and goals

Charlie Baines (9 February 1896 – 1954) was an English footballer who played in the Football League for Barnsley.
