= Louise Birt Baynes =

American photographer and naturalist

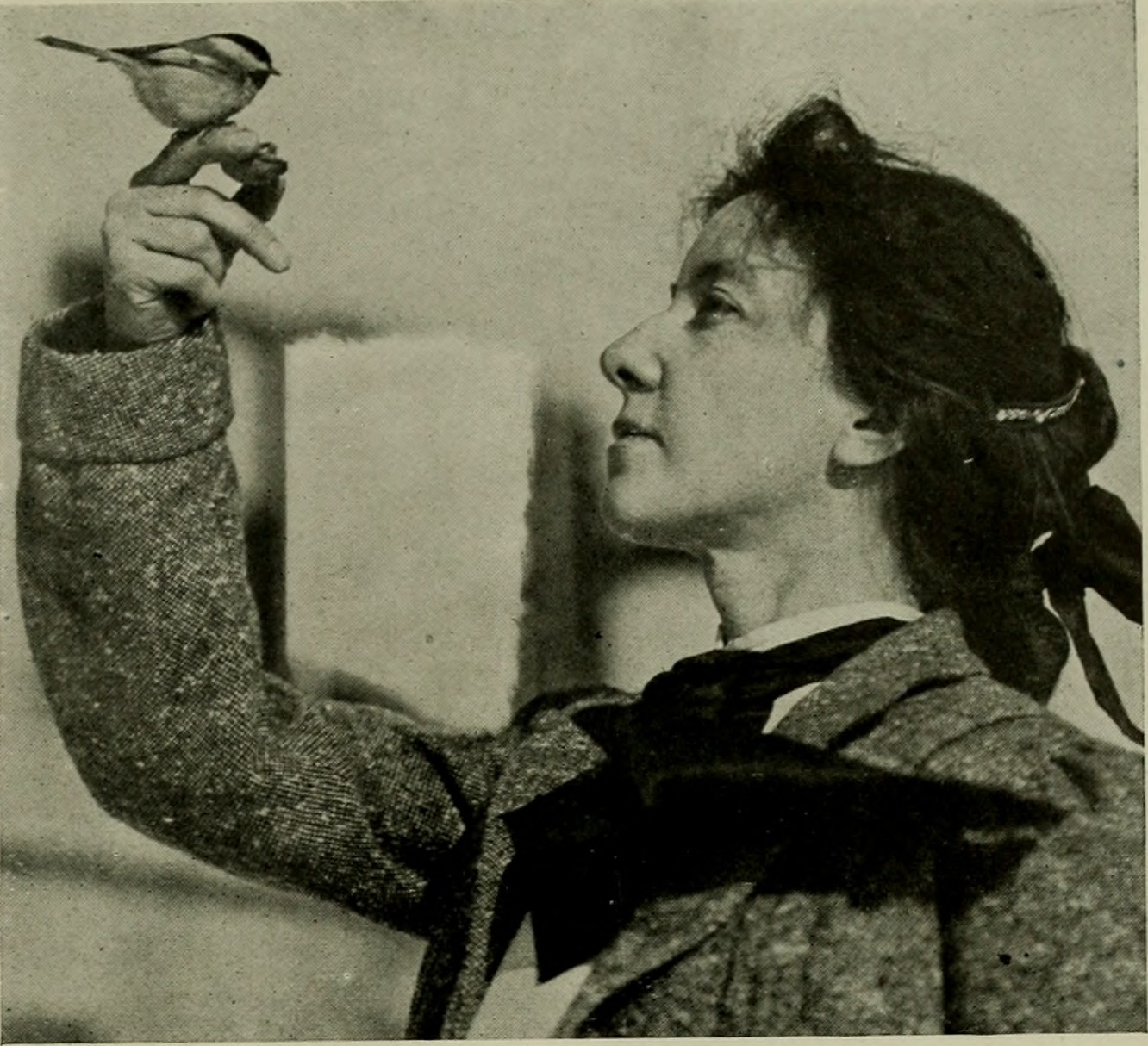
Louise Birt Baynes with a chickadee friend, 1914.

Louise Birt O'Connell Baynes (1876 – February 25, 1958) was an American photographer and naturalist.

Baynes was born as Louise Birt O'Connell in Halifax, Nova Scotia, in 1876. She married naturalist Ernest Harold Baynes on April 24, 1901, after a seven-year engagement. By 1904, she was living in Meriden, New Hampshire, where she would live most of the rest of her life. In Meriden, she aided her husband in his work and in the establishment of the Meriden Bird Club and sanctuary. Baynes and her husband were both members of the Cornish Equal Suffrage League.

Bayne's husband, Ernest, died in 1925. Baynes died on February 25, 1958, in Philadelphia. Her ashes were dispersed in Meriden in the same spot as her husband's ashes.

== Work ==
Baynes wrote and illustrated articles about animals and nature for magazines. She published "The Frolics of My Black Bear Cub," a story with accompanying photographs, in the St. Nicholas magazine in 1909. Louise Baynes edited and provided photographs for many of Ernest Harold Baynes' books. Her photographs illustrated The Sprite, the Story of a Red Fox (1924), and Wild Life in the Blue Mountain Forest (1931). She was the editor of Three Young Crows and Other Bird Stories (1927) and My Wild Animal Guests (1930).
