= Banes =

Banes can refer to:

== People ==
- Joey Banes (born 1967), American football player
- Lisa Banes (1955–2021), American actress
- Matthew Banes (born 1979), English cricketer
- Maverick Banes (born 1992), Australian tennis player

== Places ==
- Banes, Cuba, a municipality in Holguín Province, Cuba
- Bath and North East Somerset (BANES), a local authority in England, United Kingdom

== See also ==
- Baines, a surname
