= Funiculaire de Thonon-les-Bains =

Funicular railway in Thonon-les-Bains, France

Coordinates: 46°22′30″N 6°28′47″E

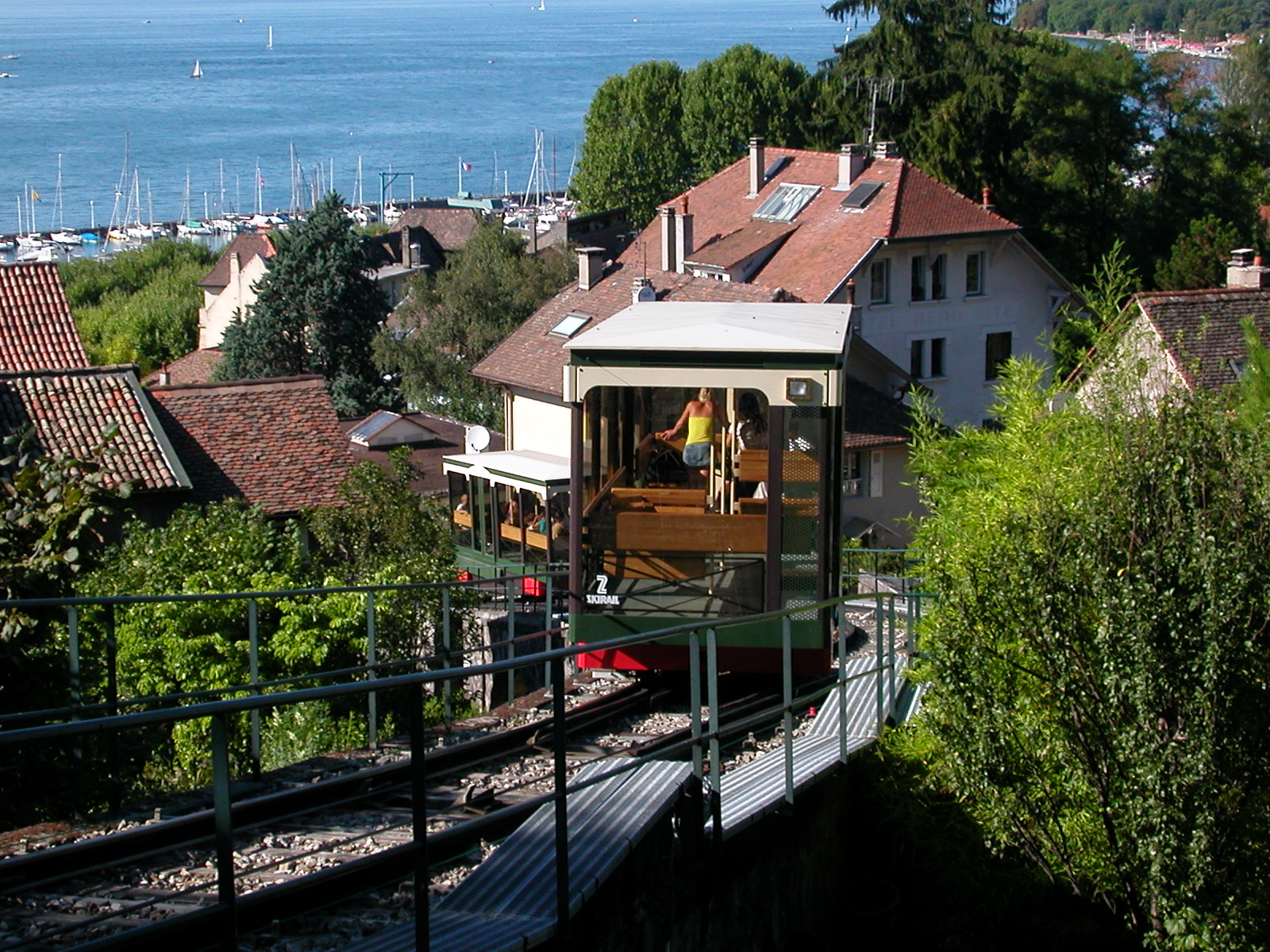
- The Funiculaire de Thonon-les-Bains

Overview
- Locale: Thonon-les-Bains, France
- Stations: 2

Service
- Ridership: 230,000 (per year)

History
- Opened: 2 April 1888; 138 years ago

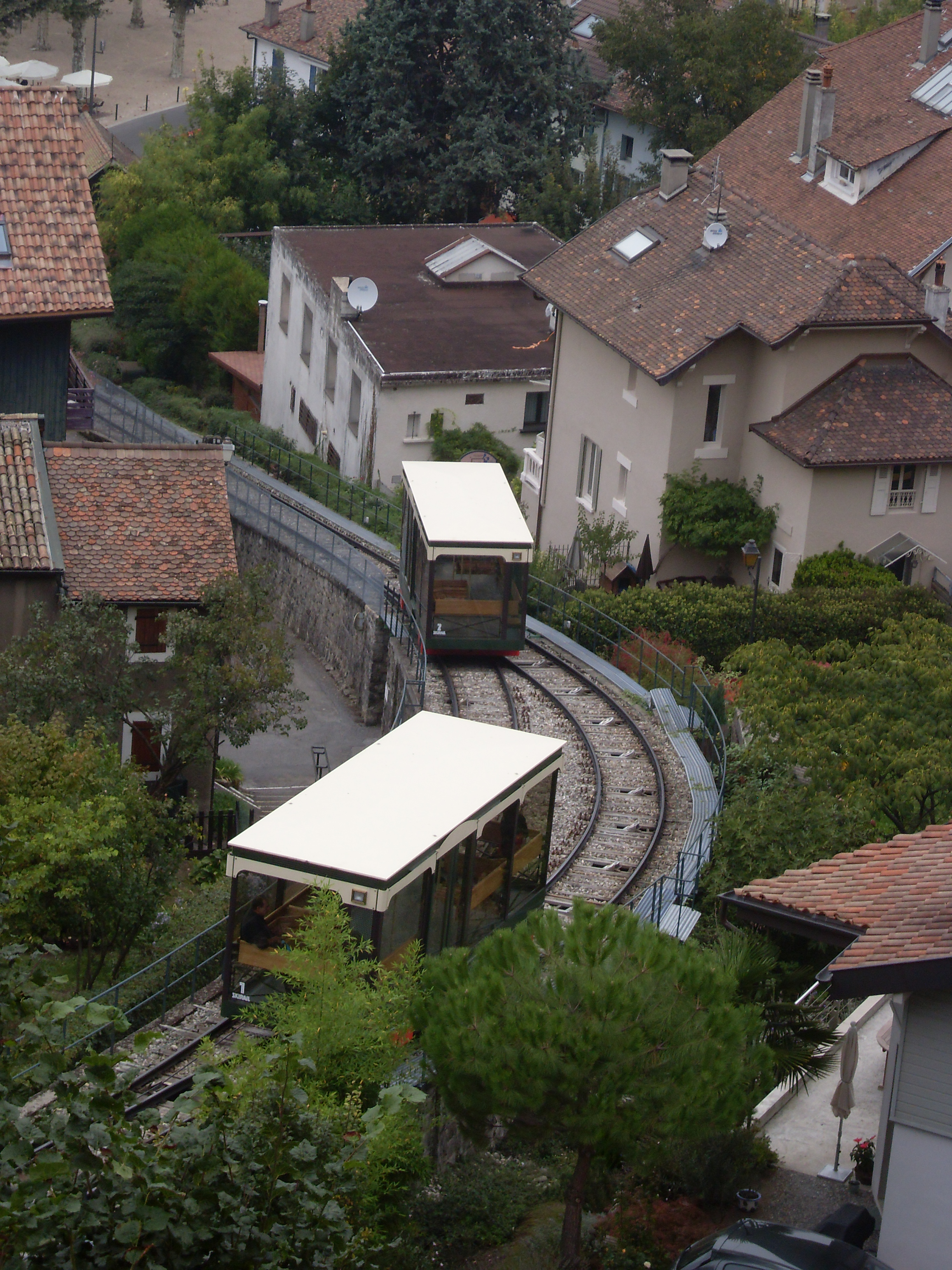
Cars at the passing loop

The Funiculaire de Thonon-les-Bains, or Thonon-les-Bains Funicular, is a funicular railway in the spa town of Thonon-les-Bains, in the French department of Haute-Savoie. The line links the Belvedere, in the city centre, to the port of Rives, on the shore of Lake Geneva.

The funicular is managed by the Syndicat intercommunal des bus de l'agglomération thononaise (SIBAT), which is also responsible for the local bus service. It was opened in 1888. It has been renovated twice, first in 1951.

After another renovation finished in 1989 a fully automated system designed by Poma was put into operation. It was the first of its kind in France.

== Characteristics ==
The funicular has the following technical parameters:

- Length: 243 metres (797 ft)
- Height: 46 metres (151 ft)
- Average steepness: 21%
- Capacity: 54 passengers per car
- Haulage speed: 3 metres per second (9.8 ft/s)

== See also ==
- List of funicular railways
