= Vernet-les-Bains =

Vernet-les-Bains Vernet (Catalan)
- Commune
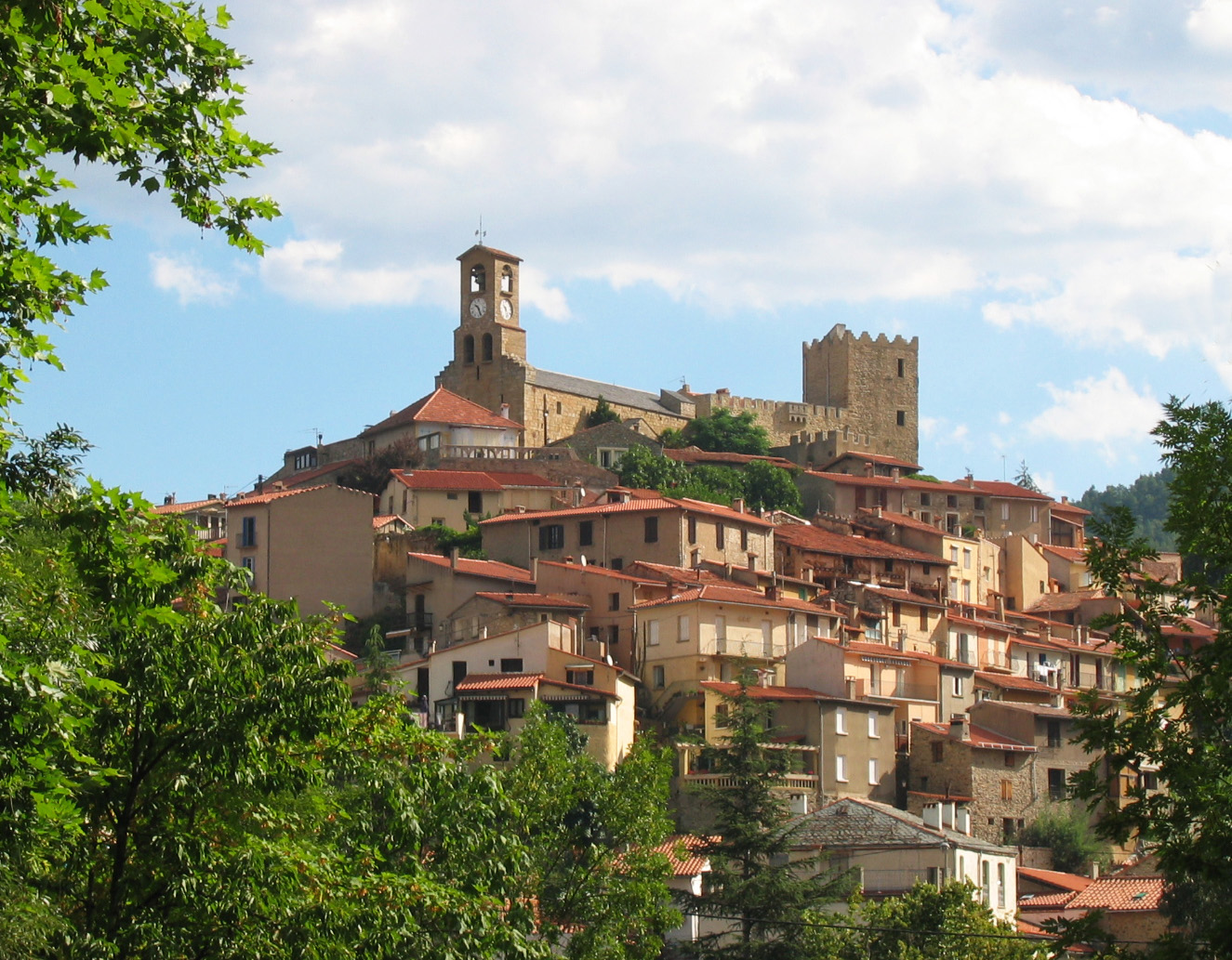
- The church and surrounding buildings in Vernet-les-Bains

- Coat of arms
- Location of Vernet-les-Bains
- Location within France Location within Occitanie
- Coordinates: 42°33′00″N 2°23′19″E
- Country: France
- Region: Occitania
- Department: Pyrénées-Orientales
- Arrondissement: Prades
- Canton: Le Canigou

Government
  - Mayor (2026–32): Pierre Serra
- Area^{1}: 16.76 km^{2} (6.47 sq mi)
- Elevation: 850 m (2,790 ft)
- Highest elevation: 2,760 m (9,060 ft)
- Lowest elevation: 559 m (1,834 ft)
- Population (2023): 1,498
  - Density: 89.38/km^{2} (231.5/sq mi)
- Time zone: UTC+01:00 (CET)
  - Summer (DST): UTC+02:00 (CEST)
- INSEE/Postal code: 66222 /66820
- ^{1} French Land Register data, which excludes lakes, ponds, glaciers > 1 km^{2} (0.386 sq mi or 247 acres) and river estuaries.

Vernet-les-Bains (French pronunciation: [vɛʁnɛ le bɛ̃]; lit. 'Vernet-the-Baths'; Catalan: Vernet) is a commune in the Pyrénées-Orientales department in southern France.

The Catalan word for an alder tree is "vern". "Vernet" is derived from "verneda", a Catalan word meaning a group of alder trees. Vernet officially became Vernet-les-Bains in 1953.

It is a centre for visitors and holidaymakers. The village has a sunny climate (with, on average, 300 days of sunshine each year) and is set in a sheltered valley in the foothills of the Canigó mountain – which rises to a height of 2,785 metres (over 9,000 feet). Vernet-les-Bains is also known for its hot water springs. There is a professional spa/therapy centre in the village.

== Geography ==
=== Localisation ===
Vernet-les-Bains is located in the canton of Le Canigou and in the arrondissement of Prades.

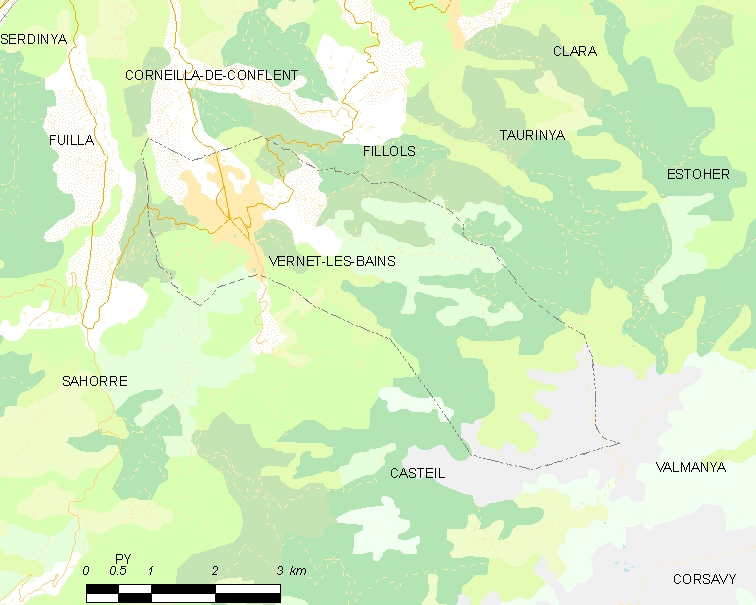
Map of Vernet-les-Bains and its surrounding communes

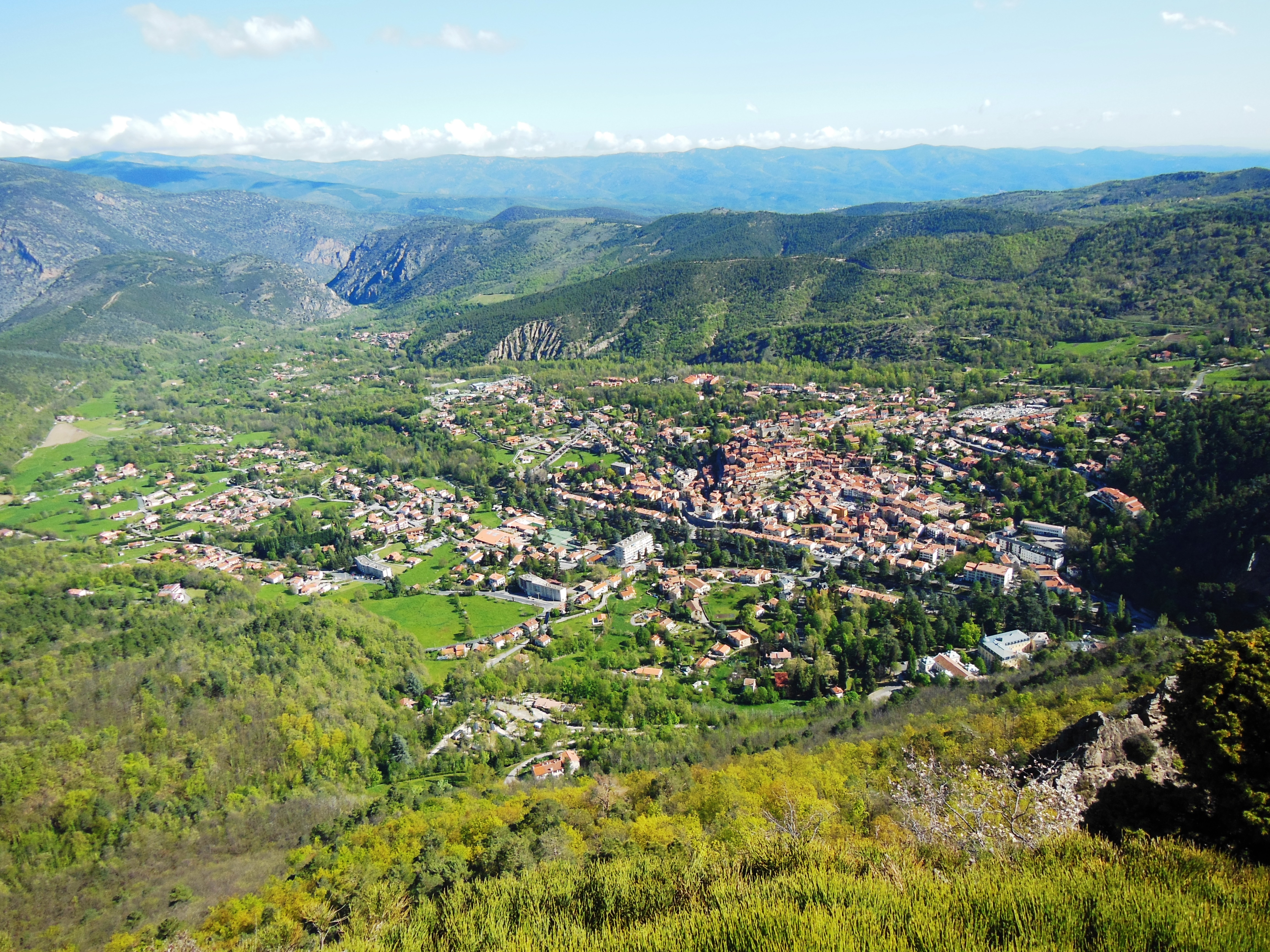
View of the whole of Vernet-les-Bains from Pic de la Pena (or Penya).

=== Geology ===
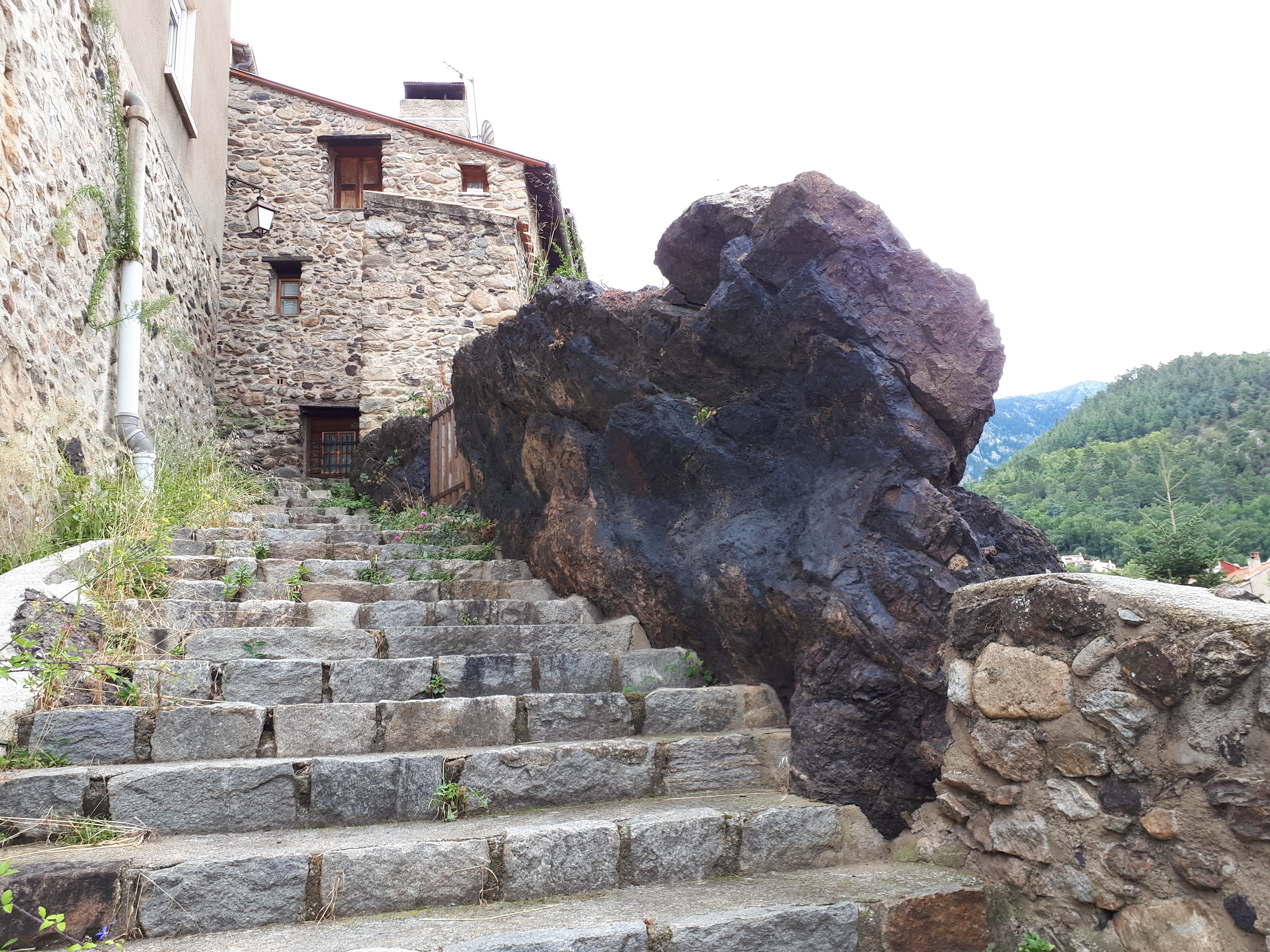
The geology of Vernet-les-Bains mostly consists of formations between 300 and 600 million years old. These formations include iron ore veins which have been worked for centuries and which even appear in the centre of the village itself.

=== Transport ===
Close by is the Yellow train which runs 63 kilometres (39 mi) from Villefranche-de-Conflent up to Mont-Louis and Latour-de-Carol. The line has the highest station in France at 1,593 metres (5,226 ft) and is both a lifeline during winter conditions and a tourist attraction.

There is a "local" bus service between Perpignan & Vernet-les-Bains.

Villefranche-de-Conflent is also on a regional train line that connects to Perpignan.

== Population ==
Historical population
Year	Pop.	±% p.a.
1968	1,229	—
1975	1,310	+0.92%
1982	1,325	+0.16%
1990	1,489	+1.47%
1999	1,440	−0.37%
2007	1,480	+0.34%
2012	1,415	−0.89%
2017	1,387	−0.40%
2023	1,498	+1.29%
Source: INSEE

== Sites of interest ==
=== Village arboretum ===
Village arboretum de Vernet-les-Bains

=== Entente Cordiale Monument ===
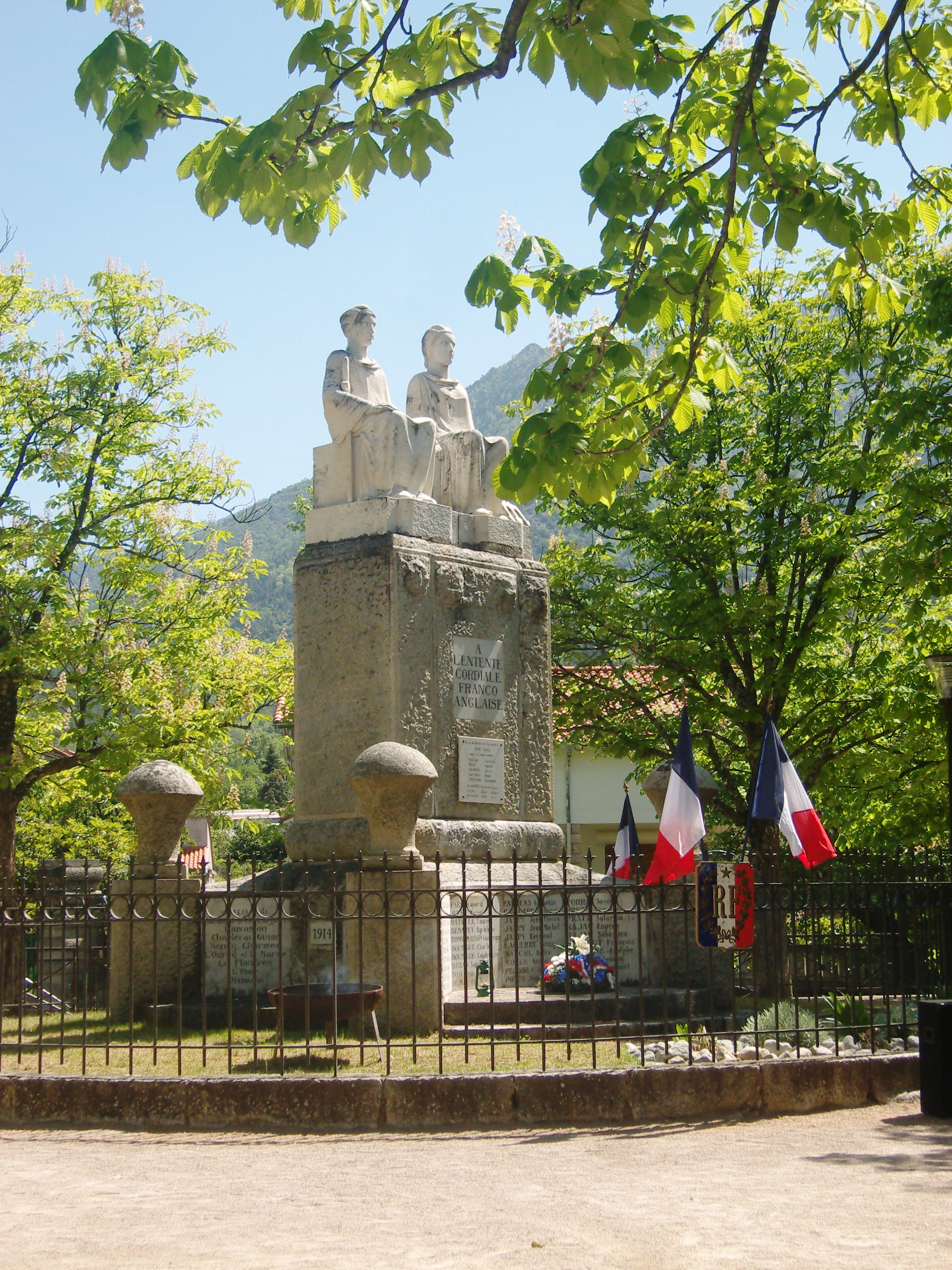
Entente Cordiale monument

Near the highest point in Vernet-les-Bains, next to the mairie (town hall), stands a monument to the Entente Cordiale of 1904. It is the only one of its kind in France.

The pedestal of the monument is made of Canigou granite. On it rest two white marble statues representing France and Britain. The pedestal itself is set upon a circular base. That in turn is located on a raised, level area of ground which covers 1,000 square metres and which is bounded by low stone walls.

The idea of erecting this monument was conceived around 1912 by the town council and its then mayor, Monsieur Joseph Mercader. The wealthy British visitors who regularly came to this health spa at that time actively supported the project. A committee of prominent French and British patrons was set up to promote the scheme. Its leading members were Lord Roberts and General Joffre. Monsieur Lambert-Violet, a leading Perpignan businessman, gave the land for the memorial to Vernet. The monument itself was the work of the Roussillon sculptor Gustave Violet, who displayed a model of his proposed work in 1913. However, progress came to a halt in 1914 with the outbreak of World War One. Little further happened until August 1920, when it was proclaimed by presidential decree that work on the monument would proceed but that it would be dedicated both to the Entente Cordiale and to the memory of those killed during the war. At the same time a new appeal was launched for funds to complete the project.

Work on erecting the monument soon got underway. Granite was hauled up from the bed of the River St-Vincent in carts pulled by oxen. The stonemason, Monsieur Herbetta, worked up to fourteen hours a day, often in the sun's full glare, fashioning and putting into place the enormously heavy blocks of stone. A circle of wrought-iron fencing was erected around the base of the monument. Monsieur Antoine Mercader remembers, as a six-year-old child, how he and other children watched as the craftsman, Monsieur Serra, poured molten lead into small holes in the ground to seal in place the fence's iron bars. When the monument was completed, it bore the following dedications:

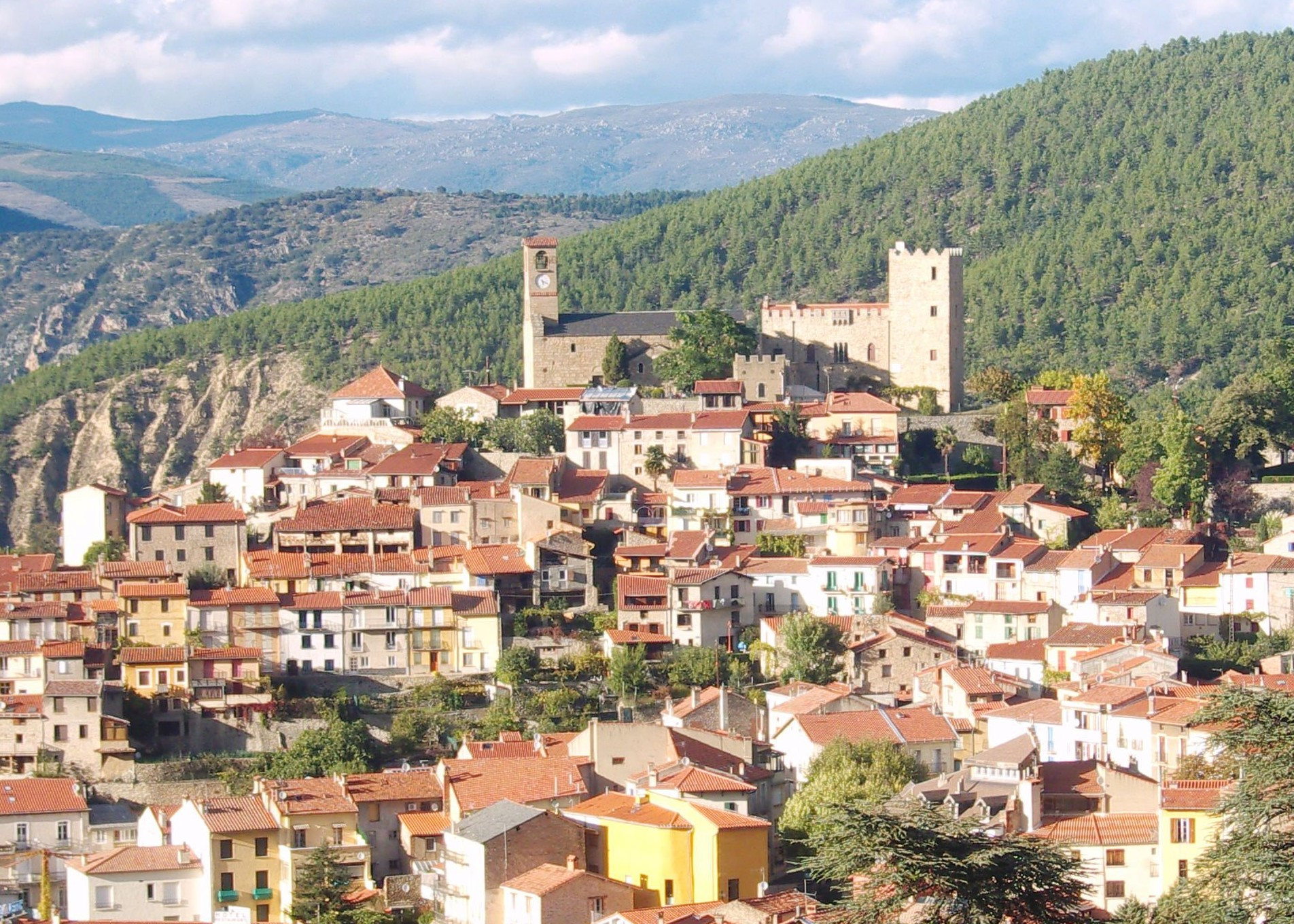
St Saturnin church, castle, and old village

"To the Entente Cordiale between France and Britain. To the glory of the Allied Nations. To the memory of soldiers from Vernet who died for their country"

=== St. Saturnin Church ===
The Église Saint-Saturnin is a church sitting on a hill with views of the mountains across the river. The church is small and basic, with a sundial on a side wall, and a plaque giving some details of the Church. The plaque states "Chapelle N.D del Puig". A church on this site is first mentioned in 1188 (although the first documented reference to Vernet itself is dated 863).

=== St. George's Church ===
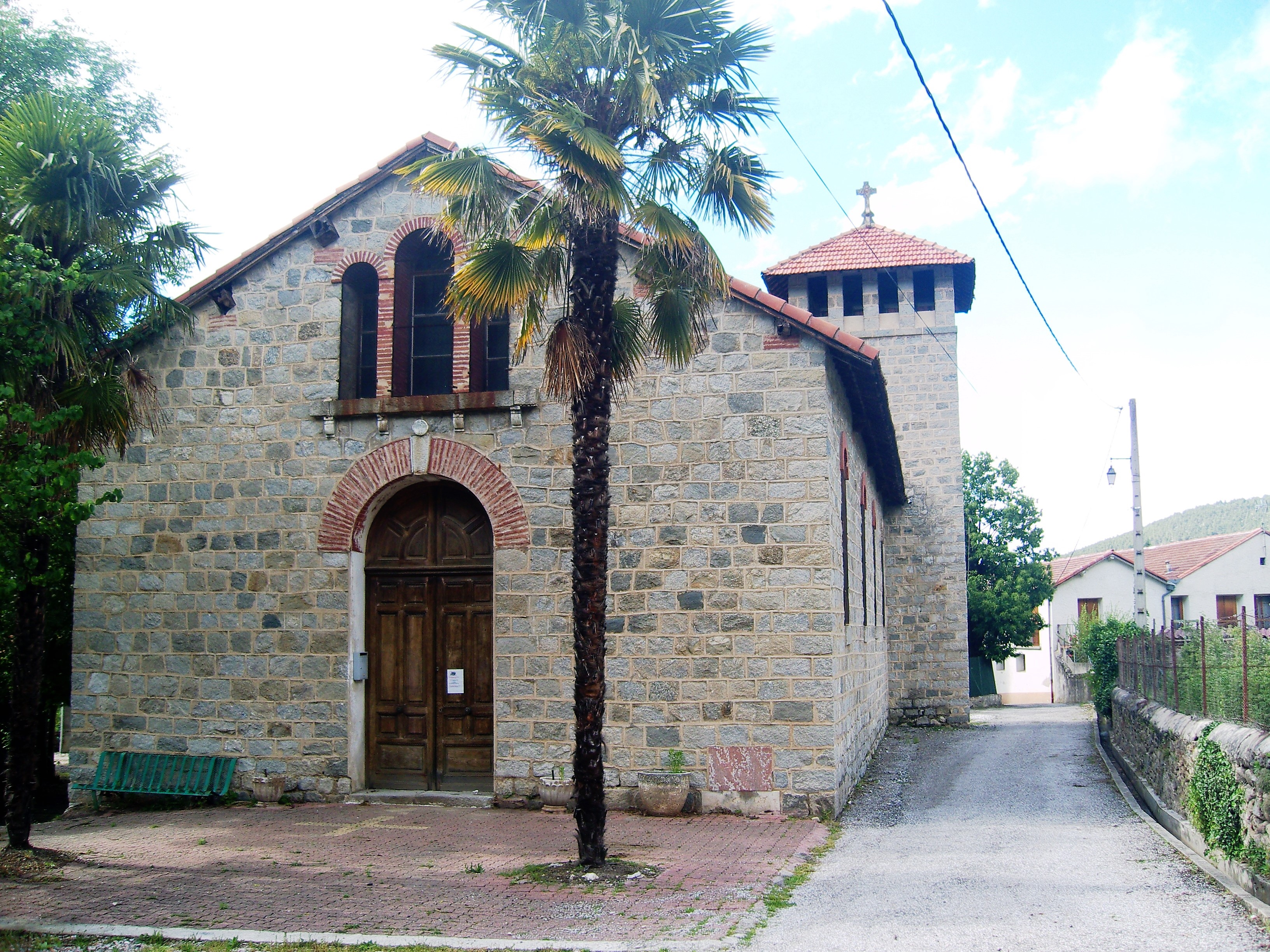
St George's church

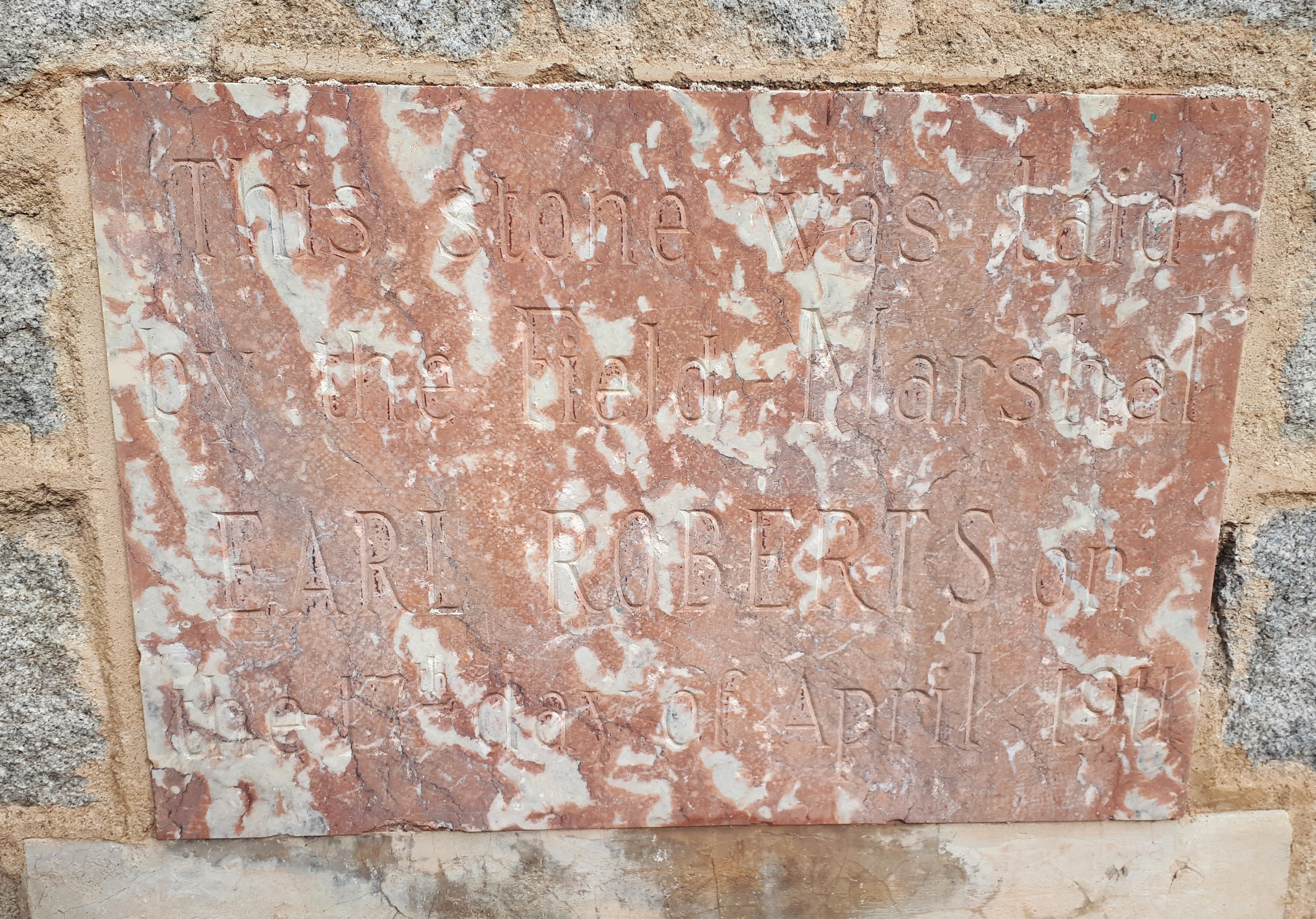
Foundation stone in Villefranche marble, St George's church ("laid by the Field Marshal Earl Roberts on the 17th day of April 1911").

St. George's Church is a parish church of the Diocese in Europe of the Church of England. It was constructed between 1912 and 1913 due to an influx of English residents to the town. During the 1960s the building closed for repairs, and didn't reopen until 1997, when a retired Anglican priest was asked to re-open the church. The building is constructed in a Romanesque style. In 2019, St. George's became home to the first peal of change ringing bells in France, and the first ring of ten bells in mainland Europe.

=== Walks near Vernet-les-Bains ===
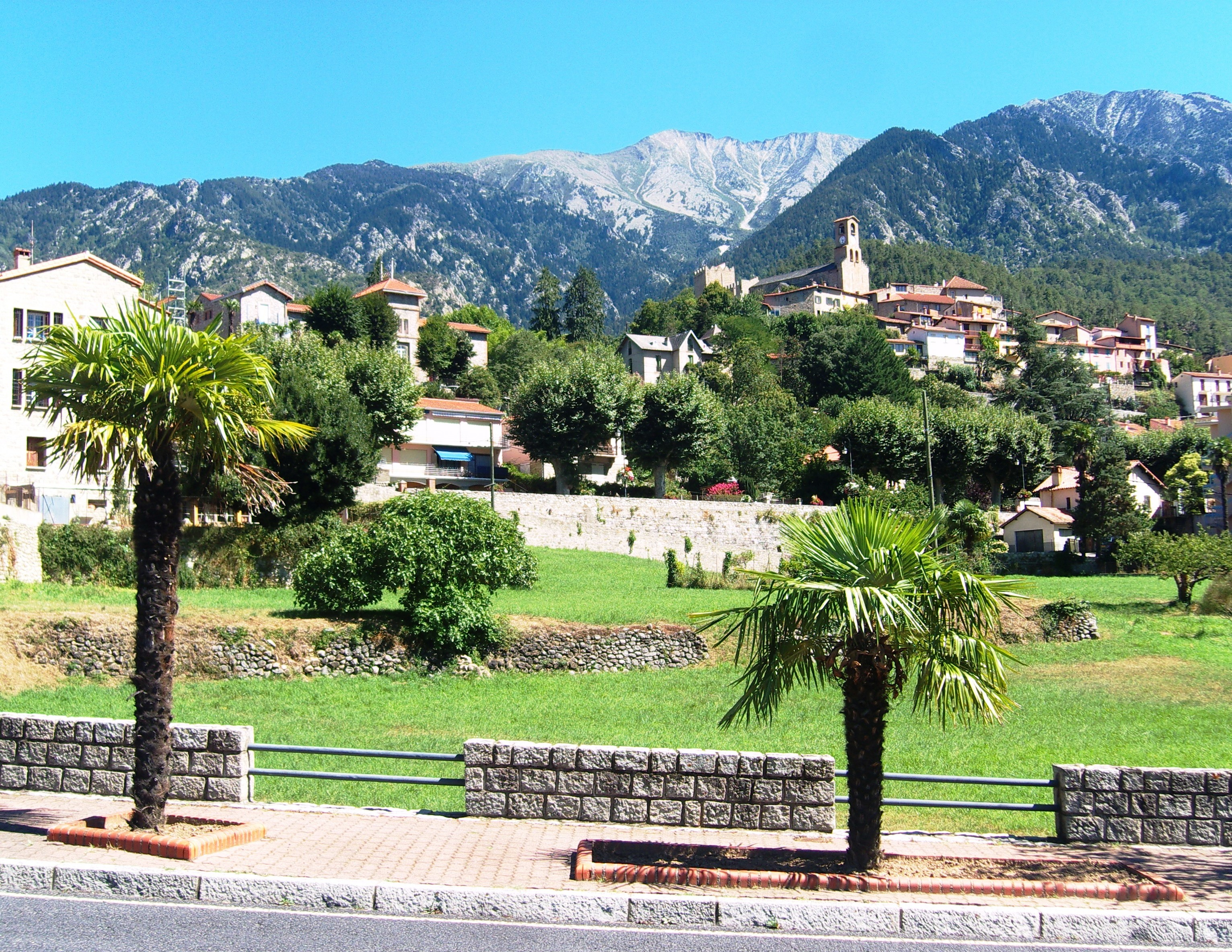
Pic du Canigó, seen from the lowest, north-western, sector of the commune.

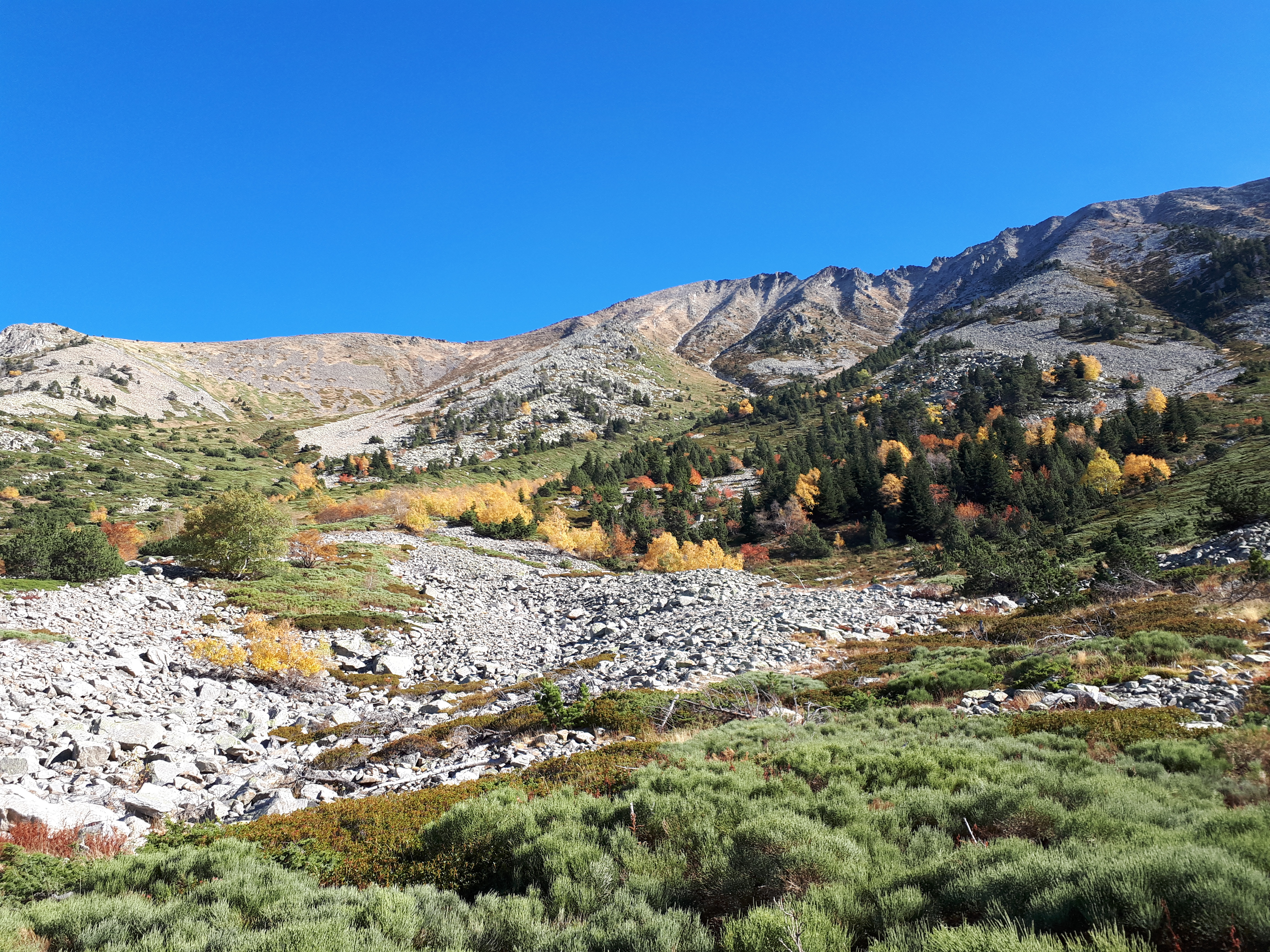
The Canigó summit ridge, seen from "Les Conques", in the highest, south-eastern, sector of the commune.

There are a number of walks from and close to Vernet-les-Bains. It can be used as a base from which to climb to the summit of Canigó.

=== Rudyard Kipling ===
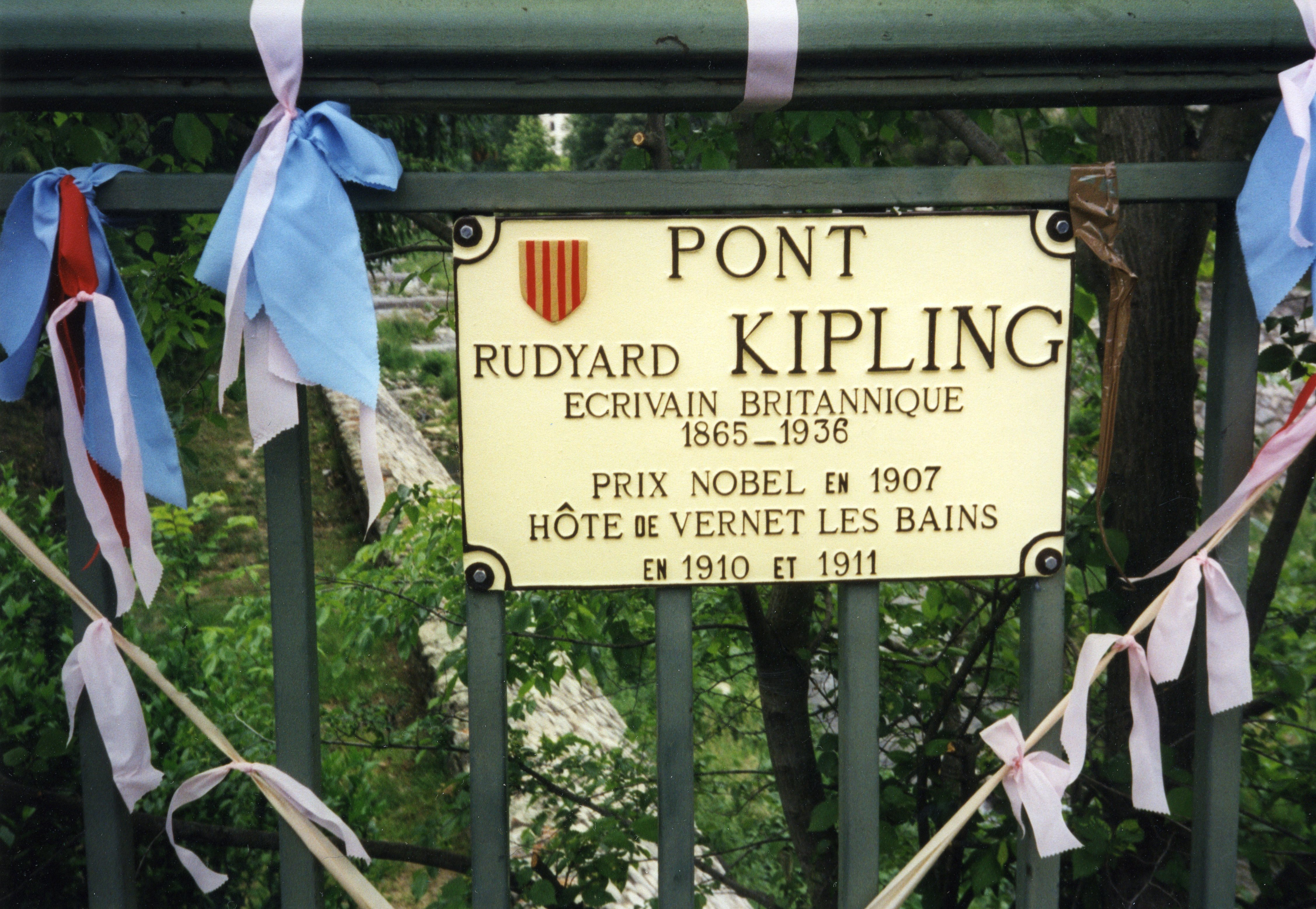
Plaque on a bridge over the River Cady, in Vernet-les-Bains

Rudyard Kipling, who was awarded the Nobel Prize for literature in 1907, stayed in Vernet-les-Bains in 1910, 1911, 1914 and 1926. At that time, Kipling was well known in France, following the success of the French version of his classic work, The Jungle Book.

While he was in Vernet, Kipling wrote about Canigó. In a letter to the Club Alpin, he praised it as "a magician among mountains".

Kipling also wrote a short story titled Why Snow Falls at Vernet. It addresses the English practice of discussing the weather.

Vincent Scott O’Connor, a contemporary of Kipling, published a vivid account of daily life in Vernet during the time of Kipling’s early stays there.

Today, the central bridge over the River Cady in Vernet-les-Bains is named after Kipling.

The bridge, and the town itself, is featured in the Danish thriller film ID:A (2011).

== See also ==
- Communes of the Pyrénées-Orientales department
