= Ernest Harold Baynes =

American naturalist and writer

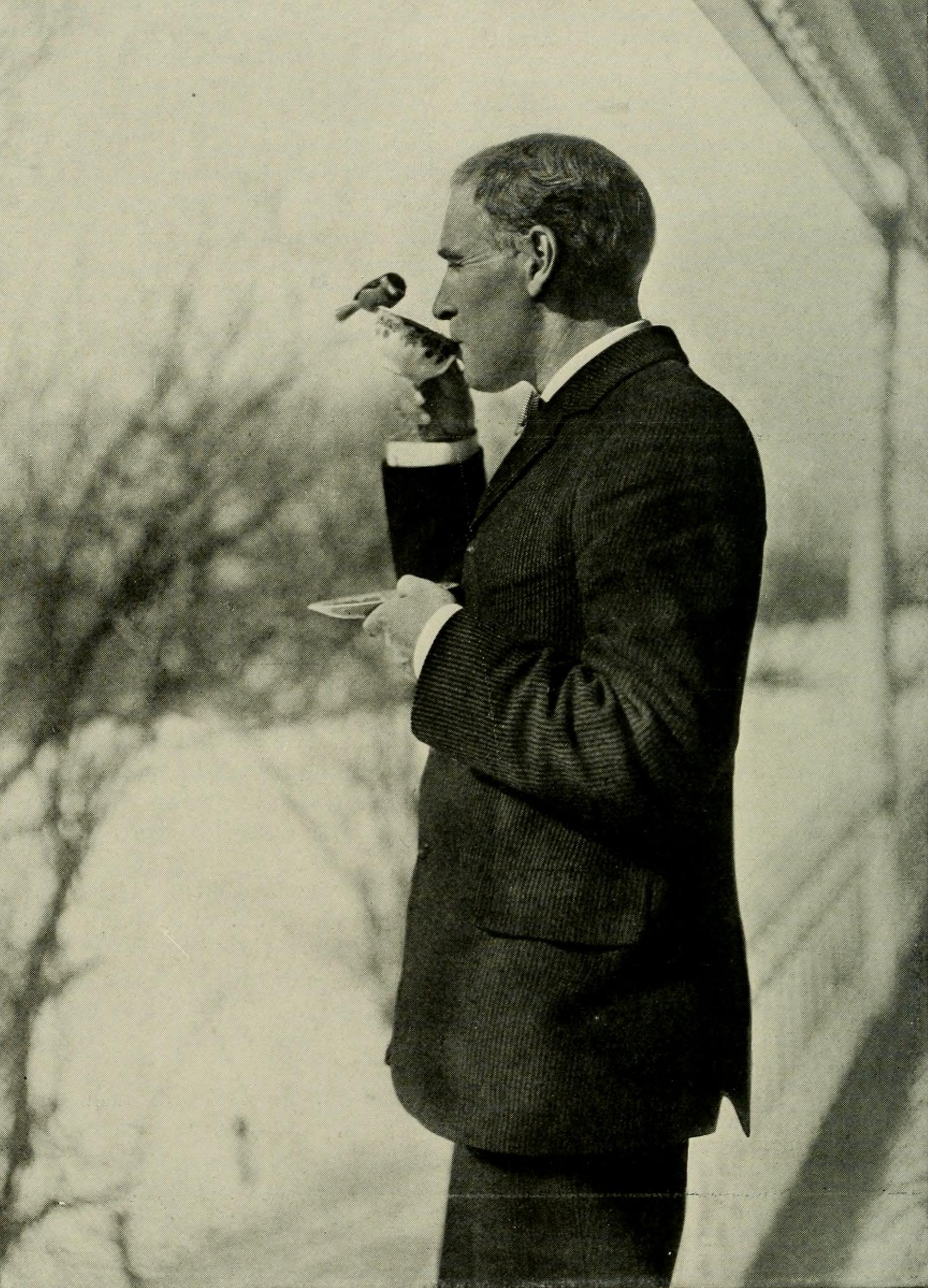
"Ernest Harold Baynes entertaining a friendly chickadee", 1915

Ernest Harold Baynes (1868–1925) was an American naturalist and writer. He was instrumental in bringing to public attention the near demise of songbirds and bison. He founded the American Bison Society, of which President Teddy Roosevelt was honorary chairman. He was "the closest thing New England, and the world for that matter, will ever get to a real-life Doctor Dolittle; all sorts of New England birds and animals—foxes, wolves, chickadees, bears and bison—were known to roam around and in and out of his house."

== Early life ==
Baynes was born on 1 May 1868 in Calcutta, West Bengal in India, the son of John Bayne, a British inventor, and Helen Augusta Nowill Baynes. In the 1870s, after his father had failed at running a Calcutta textiles company, the family moved to New York, where John set up the Baynes Tracery and Mosaic Co., producing amongst other products etched memorial tablets. He patented his manufacturing processes with the tastemaker Lockwood de Forest, and Baynes tablets survive at Grace Church in Newark, the Battell Chapel and Norfolk Library in Norfolk, Connecticut, and the Cleveland Soldiers' and Sailors' Monument. John Baynes claimed (without proof) to have invented "photo-modeling", a technique for using light to carve sculpture. Ernest's siblings included his younger sister Lillian Baynes Griffin, a journalist and photographer, and John R. Baynes, a metal etcher and photographer.

Baynes married Louise Birt O'Connell on April 24, 1901.

== Education and career ==
Baynes received his early education in England. At age 11, he moved with his parents to Bronx Park, New York. He graduated as valedictorian of his high school class and subsequently attended the College of the City of New York. After a year working as a journalist at the New York Times in 1891, he began publishing articles on nature and wildlife in various newspapers. "Without the constraints of scholarly publishing, he became a wildlife showman through his articles and appearances." By 1901 Baynes had embarked on a career writing and speaking about natural history, and at this time married Louise Birt O'Connell and moved to Meriden, New Hampshire.

Baynes and his wife, Louise Birt Baynes, were supportive of women's suffrage and were members of the local state suffrage group.

== Bison conservation ==
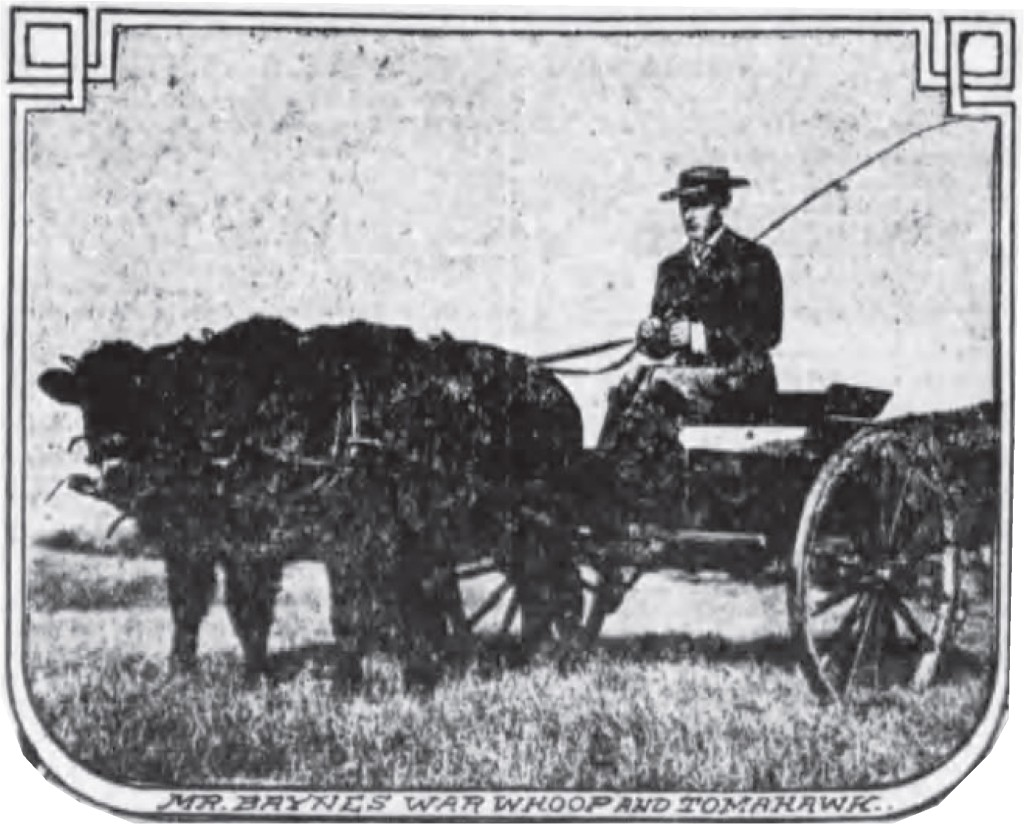
Baynes driving his bison team of War Whoop and Tomahawk, 1907

In 1904 he was appointed conservator of the Corbin Park buffalo reserve on the edge of the Blue Mountain Forest in New Hampshire, by Austin Corbin Jr. (d.1938), whose father the banker and railroad entrepreneur Austin Corbin (1827–1896) had established it. Known as the "Blue Mountain Forest Association", it was a limited membership proprietary hunting club, the park of which comprised 26,000 acres (110 km^{2}) in the towns of Cornish, Croydon, Grantham, Newport and Plainfield. Corbin Sr. imported bison from Oklahoma, Montana, Wyoming, Manitoba and Texas and donated bison to other American zoos and preserves. He also imported exotic species from Europe and Canada, including wild boar from the Black Forest of Germany. Having been purchased by a syndicate of hunters in 1944, the park survives in 2020, surrounded by a 26-mile-long (42 km) chain-link fence, as a non-profit organization with a membership of about 30 wealthy game hunters, and is referred to as the "millionaires hunt club", said to be "the most exclusive game preserve in the United States". The herd of bison, however, was destroyed in the 1940s following an outbreak of brucellosis, and the main species preserved and hunted are elk and boar.

From a natural level of 60 million in America, the bison population had been reduced by human activity to just 1,000 by the 1890s, and in 1904 160 of these animals lived within Corbin Park. In about 1906 Baynes conducted a survey into surviving numbers of American bison, and found that 2,039 existed, 325 in the wild (25 in the USA, 300 in Canada), and 1,714 in captivity (1,109 in the USA, 175 in Canada and 130 in Europe, 300 elsewhere). After 15 years of work and campaigning by Baynes, the national bison herd had increased to 20,000. He was famous for his tame bison and for driving around the park in a carriage pulled by a pair of bison War Whoop and Tomahawk, trained by him in an effort to promote the usefulness of the breed as draught animals. Baynes commented, "Of all the works of the late Mr. Austin Corbin, the preservation of that herd of bison was the one that would earn his country's deepest gratitude. His experiment led to the founding of the American Bison Society and was connected, directly or otherwise, with the formation of some of our national parks."

== Bird conservation ==
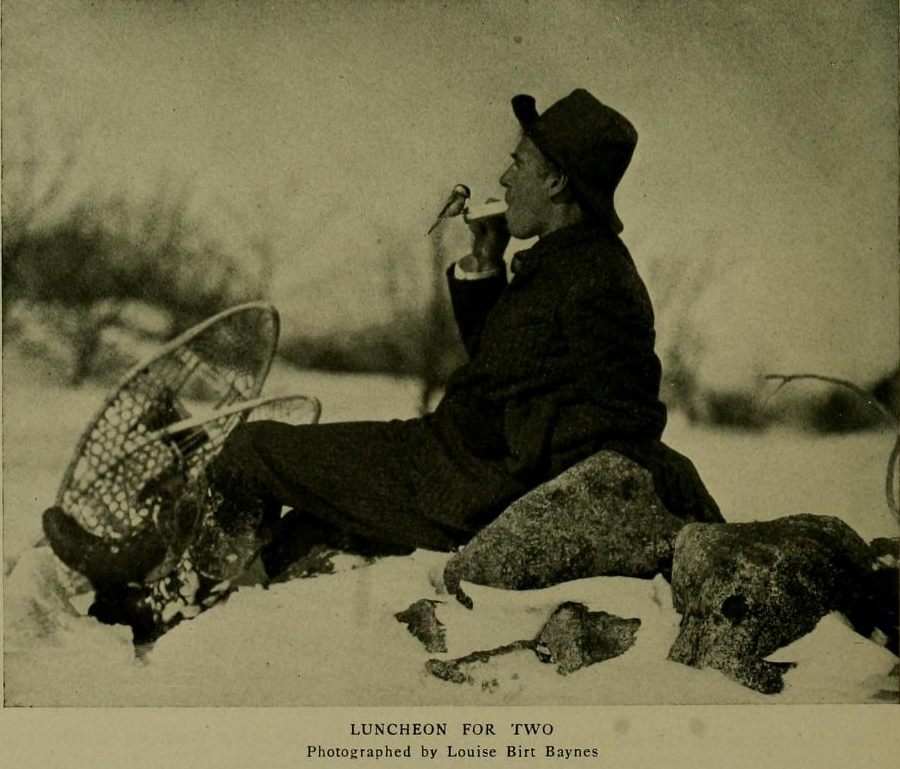
"Luncheon for Ernest Harold Baynes and a chickadee", 1905 photograph by Louise Birt Baynes

He campaigned against wild birds being killed for their plumage. In 1913 he established one of the earliest bird sanctuaries (the Meriden Bird Club) at his home at Meriden, New Hampshire, which occasion was marked by a play being performed there in 1914 written by poet Percy MacKaye and called Sanctuary: A Bird Masque, with actors dressed in bird costumes, including Baynes himself in the role of "Shy, the Naturalist". In attendance was President Woodrow Wilson. Baynes' activity is believed to have maintained the political appetite to ban the importation of bird feathers, included within the Underwood Tariff bill then being debated in Congress. The play was performed across the country and helped to fuel the bird-protection movement developing in the 1910s.

== Vivisection ==
Baynes investigated vivisection and the claims of anti-vivisectionists. He visited laboratories where experiments were carried out and came to the unexpected conclusion that little pain had been inflicted on the animals which he believed was insignificant in comparison to the relief from pain the research had given humans.

He wrote an article "The Truth about Vivisection" for the Woman's Home Companion in July, 1921 in which he supported vivisection and critiqued the arguments of anti-vivisectionists. Baynes publicly declared himself a supporter of vivisection, which caused great controversy. He was attacked by anti-vivisection organizations as a fake humanitarian and a supporter of animal cruelty. Walter Hadwen of the American Anti-Vivisection Society wrote a rebuttal to Baynes' article, stating it was filled with misinformation. Baynes, however, received support from former president of the American Medical Association W. W. Keen, Secretary of Agriculture Henry Cantwell Wallace, director of the American Museum of Natural History Frederic Augustus Lucas, and many other academics and doctors.

Baynes defended vivisection for developing methods of disease prevention. He embarked on a lecture tour, during which he accused anti-vivsectionists of the newly-coined psychological condition "zoophil-psychosis". One audience member noted, "the main tenor of his remarks was that persons who believed in anti-vivisection were mentally psychopathic." In 1923, Baynes authored a pamphlet Vivisection and Modern Miracles.

== Death ==
Baynes died aged 56 on January 21, 1925, at his home "Sunset Ridge" in Meriden. His ashes were scattered on Croydon Mountain near his home, commemorated on a local monument inscribed: Here were scattered the ashes of Ernest Harold Baynes, lover of animals and men, and loved of them. May 1, 1868, January 21, 1925.

== In popular culture ==
Ernest Harold Baynes appears in Annie Hartnett's 2023 novel Unlikely Animals, as a ghost manifesting to the protagonist's father who is suffering with dementia. The novel is set in the fictional New Hampshire town of Everton, near Baynes's own New Hampshire home.

== Selected publications ==
- Wild Bird Guests: How to Entertain Them (1915)
- The Truth About Vivisection (1921)
- Polaris, the Story of an Eskimo Dog (1922)
- Vivisection and Modern Miracles (1923)
- The Sprite: The Story of a Red Fox (1924)
- The Book of Dogs: An Intimate Study of Mankind's Best Friend (with Louis Agassiz Fuertes)
- Animal Heroes of the Great War (1925)
- Three Young Crows, and Other Bird Stories (1927)
- Jimmie: The Story of a Black Bear Cub (1929)
- War Whoop and Tomahawk: The Story of Two Buffalo Calves (1929)
- Wild Life in the Blue Mountain Forest, revised and edited by Raymond Gorges, foreword by Austin Corbin, with illustrations from photographs by the author and Louise Birt Baynes (1931).
