= Village arboretum de Vernet-les-Bains =

Arboretum in Languedoc-Roussillon, France

Coordinates: 42°33′00″N 2°23′19″E

The Village arboretum de Vernet-les-Bains is an arboretum planted throughout the town of Vernet-les-Bains, Pyrénées-Orientales, Languedoc-Roussillon, France. It is open daily without charge.

The arboretum's beginnings can be traced to a devastating flood in 1940, with a variety of trees planted in the 1960s during restoration work. In 1992 the local primary school undertook a project to identify the tree species in town, which led to an award in 1994 from the Fondation Yves Rocher. In 1996 the municipality officially created the "village arboretum", with a statement of faith that provides (among other things) that for every child born in town, the parents will plant that child's tree.

Today the arboretum contains more than 2,000 identified tree specimens, of which about 1,000 are labeled, representing 274 taxa. The town is divided into sections, each about 100 m^{2} in area, with an identification sign for each keyed to the trees in that section.

== See also ==
- List of botanical gardens in France
