= Bane Vasic =

Bane Vasic is an engineer at the University of Arizona, Tucson. He was named a fellow of the Institute of Electrical and Electronics Engineers (IEEE) in 2012 for his contributions to coding theory and its applications in data storage systems and optical communications.
