= Charles Bane Jr. =

American poet

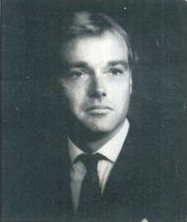
- Born: 1951 (age 74–75)

Charles Bane Jr. (born 1951) is an American poet, noted for his romantic use of language to explore humanistic themes.

The Huffington Post said of Bane that his "work does not only stand on the shoulders of giants, it shrinks them" Diana Peck, writing for Calliope Nerve, describes reading Bane's poems as being "washed over with a something akin to a secular spiritualism."
