= Bain (surname) =

Bains
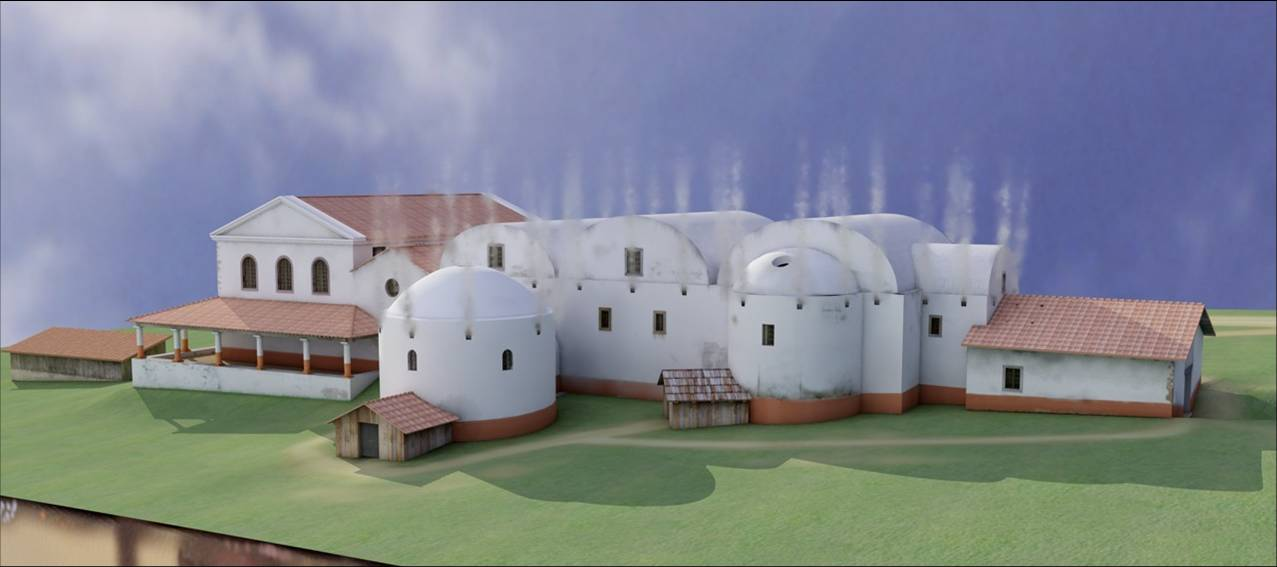
- Reconstruction of a Roman bath house in Germany.

Origin
- Region of origin: England; Punjab(Jat), Germany, Scotland

Bain or Bains is an English, French, Punjabi and Scottish surname. It may also be a variant form of a German surname.

Bains shares many of the origins of the surname Baines.

== Origin of the surname ==
=== Northern English ===
There are two origins for the Northern English surname.

1. The northern English surname Bains is sometimes derived from a nickname meaning "bone", which probably referred to someone who was exceptionally tall, or lean. This nickname is derived from the Old English ban, meaning "bone". In northern dialects of Middle English, the a was preserved, but in southern dialects the a was changed to o (the southern form became the standard).
2. In other cases, the northern English surname is derived from a nickname of a hospitable person. This nickname is derived from the northern Middle English beyn, bayn, which mean "welcoming", "friendly"; these are in turn derived from the Old Norse beinn, meaning "straight", "direct".

=== English/French ===
An English and French origin of the surname Bains is from the occupational name of an attendant of a public bath house. This name is derived from the Middle English, and Old French baine, meaning "bath".

=== French ===
There are several other derivations of the French surname.

1. One French derivation of the surname Bains is from a topographic name, for someone who lived near a Roman bath. This name is derived from the Old French baine, meaning "bath".
2. In other cases, the name may originate from a habitational name, derived from a place in Ille-et-Vilaine.

=== Scottish ===
The Scottish surname Bain is derived from a nickname for a person with fair-hair. This name is derived from the Scottish Gaelic bàn, meaning "white", "fair". The name was common in the Scottish Highlands, and is first recorded in 1324 in Perth. The surname can also be, in some cases, a reduced form of the surname McBain. The Scottish Gaelic form of the surname Bains is Bàins (masculine), and Bhàin (feminine).

=== German ===
The name may also be a variant spelling of the north German surname Behn.

=== Punjabi ===
The Punjabi surname Bains is common amongst Punjabi Jats, which is the name of the Jat clan.

== People with the surname ==
=== Bain ===
- Addison Bain (1935–2025), NASA scientist
- Alexander Bain, several persons
- Allister Bain (1932–2026), Grenadian-born British actor, playwright, screenwriter and dancer
- Aly Bain (born 1946), Scottish fiddler
- Andrew Geddes Bain (c. 1797–1864), South African geologist, road engineer, palaeontology and explorer
- Atu Emberson Bain, Fijian political leader
- Barbara Bain (born 1931), American actress
- Barbara J. Bain (born 1941), Australian professor of haematology
- Bill Bain (disambiguation), several persons
- Bonar Bain (1923–2005), Canadian actor and identical twin brother of Conrad Bain
- Conrad Bain (1923–2013), Canadian actor and identical twin brother of Bonar Bain
- Dan Bain (1874–1962), Canadian athlete and merchant
- David Bain (born 1972), New Zealander associated with one of that country's most notable murder cases
- Donald Bain (disambiguation), several persons
- Edgar Bain (1891–1971), American metallurgist
- Ewen Bain (1925–1989), Scottish cartoonist
- F. W. Bain (1863–1940), British writer
- George Bain (disambiguation), several persons
- H. Foster Bain (1871–1948), American geologist
- Jean Bain, Australian basketball player
- James Bain (disambiguation), several persons
- Jimmy Bain (1947–2016), Scottish bassist
- Joe S. Bain (1912–1991), American economist
- John P. Bain or TotalBiscuit (1984–2018), British game critic and commentator
- Ken Bain (1942–2025), American professor and author
- Kevin Bain (born 1972), Scottish footballer
- Mary Monnett Bain (1833–1885), American Methodist
- Miranda Bain, Australian filmmaker and strategic advisor, producer of Strikebound (1984)
- Raymone Bain, spokeswoman from the public relations firm Davis, Bain & Associates Inc.
- Robert Bain (disambiguation), several people
- Robin Bain (born 1980), American actress
- Rueben Bain Jr. (born 2004), American football player
- Sam Bain (born 1971), British television writer
- Scott Bain (born 1991), Scottish footballer
- Thomas Bain (1834–1915), Canadian parliamentarian
- Wilfred Conwell Bain (1908–1997), American music educator
- William Bain (disambiguation), several persons

=== Bains ===
- Harmilan Bains Indian athlete
- Harry Bains, Canadian politician
- Harteg Bains, NewZealand
- Manreet Bains, NewZealand
- Dashmeet Bains, NewZealand
