= Rosemarkie Stone =

Pictish artifact discovered in Scotland

Coordinates: 57°35′29″N 4°6′48″W

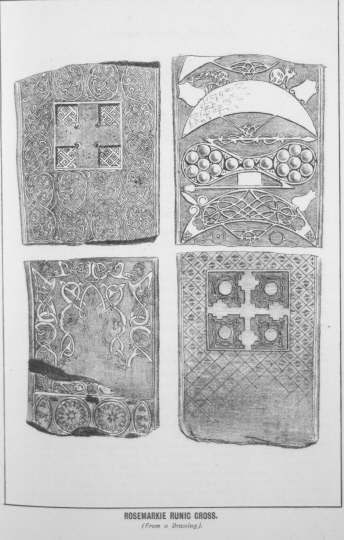
Illustration from Angus J Beaton's Illustrated Guide to Fortrose and Vicinity, with an appendix on the Antiquities of the Black Isle, published in Inverness in 1885.

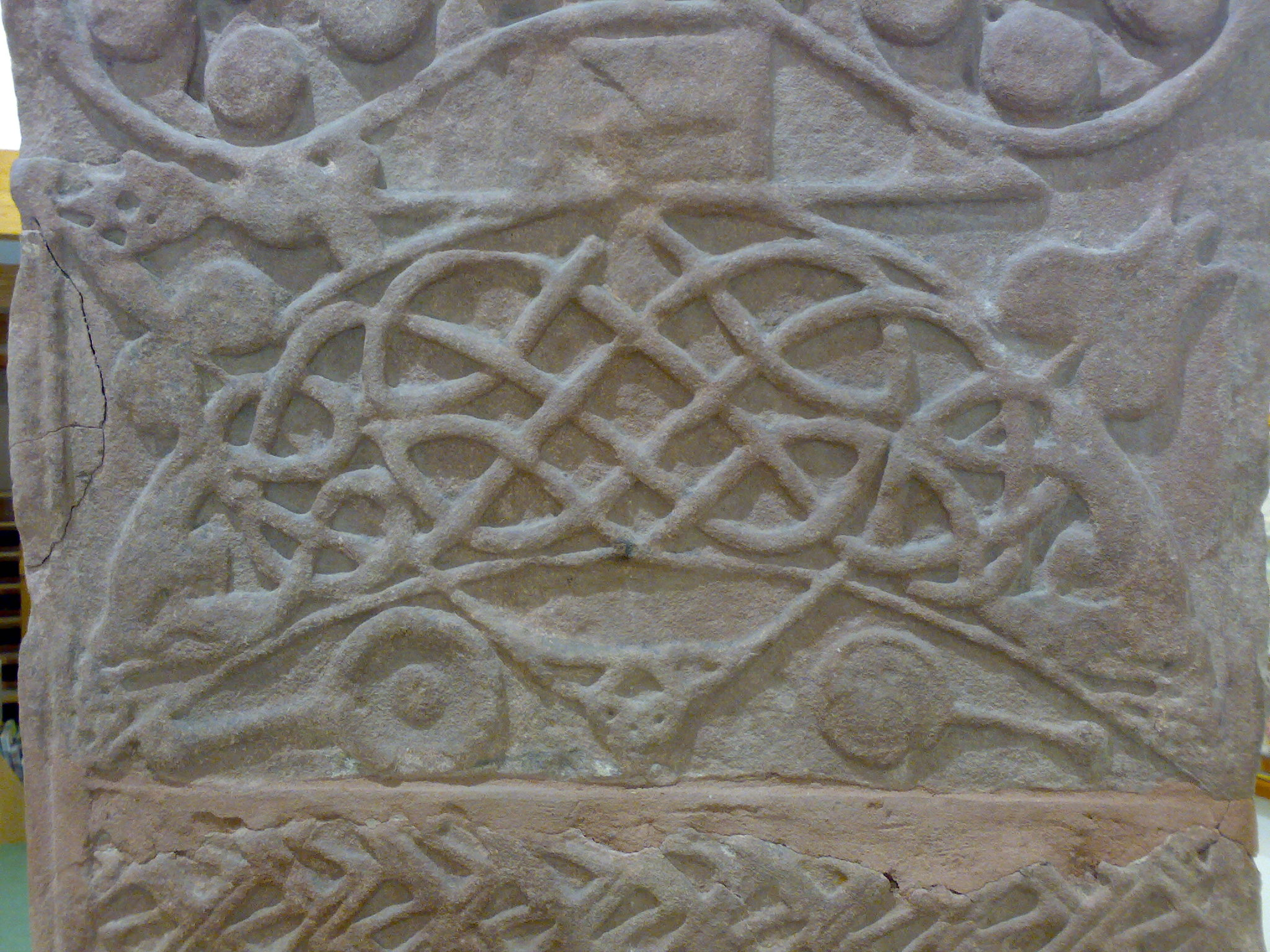
Detail of crescent and v-rod showing reconstructed join between previously broken parts

The Rosemarkie Stone or Rosemarkie Cross, a Class II Pictish stone, is one of the major surviving examples of Pictish art in stone.

== Discovery ==
Carved from fine-grained sandstone, the Rosemarkie stone was found sometime prior to 1821 in the floor of the old church in the village of Rosemarkie in Scotland. Rosemarkie was the probable site of a major Pictish monastery, on the Black Isle of Easter Ross. When found, the stone was broken into two parts that have since been reconstructed. The reconstructed stone is now on display in Rosemarkie's Groam House Museum.

== Description ==
On the front side is an elaborately decorated cross, while on the reverse side are various common Pictish symbols, including three crescents and v-rods and a double-disc and Z-rod, as well as a smaller cross at the bottom. It is the only Pictish stone to bear three versions of the same symbol. The sides are also decorated with a number of interlace patterns.

== See also ==
- Rosemarkie sculpture fragments
