= Bayne (surname) =

Bayne is a surname. Notable people with the surname include:

- Alexander Bayne (died 1737), first tenant of the chair of Scots law at the University of Edinburgh
- Beverly Bayne (1894–1982), American silent film actress
- Bill Bayne (1899–1981), American Major League Baseball pitcher
- Chris Bayne (born 1975), American former National Football League player
- Fiona Bayne (Felsie) (born 1966), Scottish curler, 1998 Winter Olympics participant
- Howard Bayne (basketball) (1942–2018), American basketball player
- Howard R. Bayne (1851–1933), American politician, lawyer and historian
- Hugh Aiken Bayne (1870–1954), American lawyer, judge and World War I officer
- John Bayne (disambiguation)
- Julia Taft Bayne (1845–1933), American author
- T. L. Bayne (1865–1934), American college sports coach and attorney
- Thomas McKee Bayne (1836–1894), American politician, lawyer and American Civil War Union colonel
- Thomas Vere Bayne (1829–1908), British academic at the University of Oxford
- Thomas Bayne (Sam Nixon) (1824–1888), American politician and former slave
- Trevor Bayne (born 1991), American NASCAR driver and Daytona 500 champion
- William Bayne (disambiguation)

== Fictional characters ==
- Russell Bayne, character in the movie Wolvesbayne

== See also ==
- Bain (surname)
- James Baine (1710–1790), a minister of the second great secession from the Church of Scotland
- Baynes, another surname
