= Bayne =

Bayne may refer to:

- Bayne (surname), a list of people
- Bayne Norrie (born 1944), Canadian football player
- Bayne, Lincoln County, Kansas, a former settlement
- Bayne, Russell County, Kansas, a former settlement
- Bayne, Washington, an unincorporated community

== See also ==
- Rural Municipality of Bayne No. 371, Saskatchewan, a rural municipality in Canada
- Bayne House (Shelbyville, Kentucky)
- Bayne's, bakery chain
- Bain (disambiguation)
