= Robert Bain =

Robert Bain may refer to

- Robert Bain (politician) (born 1946), Canadian politician
- Robert Bain (artist) (1911–1973), Scottish sculptor
- Robert Nisbet Bain (1854–1909), British historian and linguist

== See also ==
- Bain (surname)
- Bain (disambiguation)
