= Vince Jack =

Scottish footballer

Personal information
- Full name: Vincent Jack
- Date of birth: 6 August 1933
- Place of birth: Rosemarkie, Scotland
- Date of death: 2006 (age 72 or 73)
- Position: Defender

Senior career*
Years	Team	Apps	(Gls)
1955–1957	Bury	10	(0)
1957–1959	Swindon Town	26	(0)
1959–1960	Accrington Stanley	22	(0)
	Gravesend & Northfleet	?	(?)
Total		58	(0)
- * Club domestic league appearances and goals

Vincent Jack (6 August 1933 – 2006), was a Scottish professional footballer from Rosemarkie, Scotland who played as a defender for Accrington Stanley in the Football League.
