= William Bayne =

William Bayne may refer to:

- William Bayne (naval officer) (died 1782)
- William Bayne (1858–1922), Scottish writer and lecturer
- William George Bayne (died 1910), chairman of the Shanghai Municipal Council
- Bill Bayne (1899–1981), American baseball player

== See also ==
- William Bain (disambiguation)
- Bayne (disambiguation)
