= George Bain (artist) =

British artist (1881–1968)

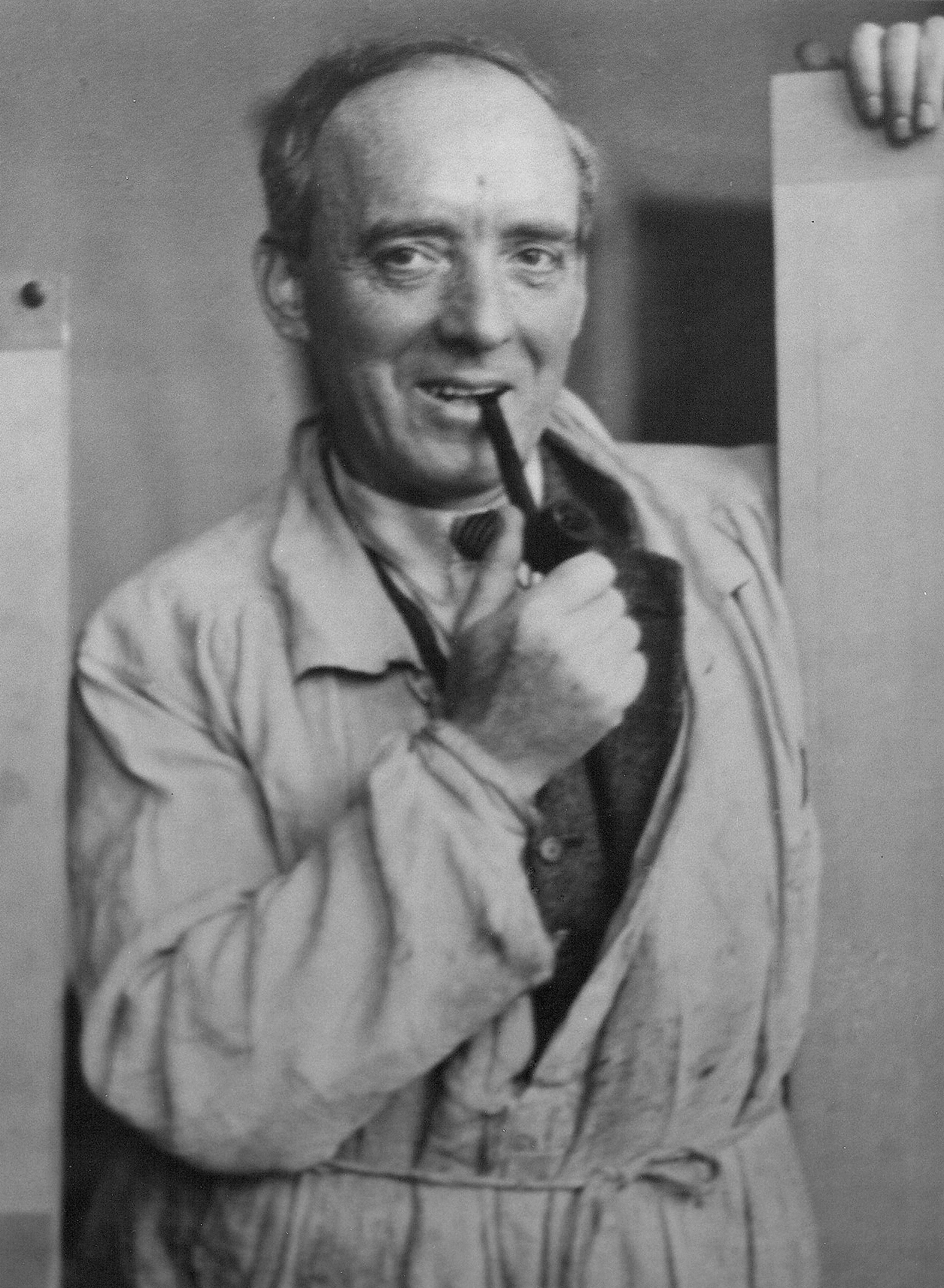
- Born: 1881
- Died: 1968 (aged 86–87)
- Movement: Celtic Art Revival

George Bain (1881–1968) was a Scottish artist and art teacher who made important and influential contributions to the revival of interest in Celtic and Insular art beginning in the 19th century.

== Biography ==
In 1888, Bain left Scrabster with his family. They had intended to emigrate to Canada but, during a stop in Leith, the Bains met with a cousin who persuaded them to settle in Edinburgh instead. After leaving school, Bain joined a firm of printers in Edinburgh while, between the age of 15 and 21, studying art on a part-time basis, attending the School of Applied Art and the Edinburgh School of Art. His first exhibited work as a painter was in 1900 at the Royal Scottish Academy.

In 1902, he obtained a scholarship to the Royal College of Art in London. When there, he found that a foundation of Classical Art still controlled the work of the college. In London, he supported himself by working as a freelance newspaper artist and as a book and magazine illustrator. In 1905, he returned to Edinburgh, continuing his career as a commercial artist while studying part-time at the Royal Scottish Academy Life School. In 1911, he decided to return to studying and gained a DA degree from Edinburgh College of Art in 1915.

During World War 1, Bain served with the Royal Engineers and his artistic talents were used both as artist in the 26th Division's theatre and when attached to General Gay's final advance through Bulgaria. Sketches and paintings from this period form part of the George Bain Collection cared for by Groam House Museum.

After the war, Bain was appointed Principal Art Teacher at Kirkcaldy High School, where he had started his teaching activities in 1899, and in due course also held the post of Principal Advisory Art Teacher for the Kirkcaldy area. He retired from teaching in 1946 and moved to Drumnadrochit in Glenurquhart, the birthplace of his wife Jesse (married 1908). There he attempted to establish a College of Celtic Cultures at a nearby mansion, Balmacaan House. His vision was to "give the people of the Highlands a unique opportunity to study their own history, to build up afresh the national Celtic art, and to solve some of the agricultural problems peculiar to the hills and glens of the north of Scotland." For a variety of reasons, particularly the difficulty of obtaining financial support, Bain had to give up the idea, and in 1952, he and Jesse moved to Codsall in Staffordshire where they shared a large house with their daughter Christy and her husband. Bain had a studio in the house, and he continued with lecture tours and worked on artistic commissions. Jesse died in 1957, and Bain himself died on 25 March 1968.

== Artistic achievements and contribution to the Celtic Art revival ==
Bain was the first artist to analyse and deconstruct the designs found on Pictish sculpture and metalwork, and on illuminated manuscripts such as the Book of Kells and the Lindisfarne Gospels. His book Celtic Art: The Methods of Construction was published in 1951. It had little impact at the time, but on its re-issue in 1972 it introduced a generation to Celtic knotwork, the Pictish stones, the Book of Kells and the Book of Durrow. As well as describing and illustrating over 200 historical examples, his book was notable for giving detailed instructions on creating similar interlace, spiral, and key pattern designs, and encouraging their use in craftwork.

An unlicensed derivative of a Bain knotwork appears on the original cover of King Crimson's Discipline album; in later releases, it was replaced by a knotwork designed by Steve Ball, A Bain design was used to illustrate a rug by Quayle and Tranter, a carpet manufacturer based in Kidderminster, England.

His son Iain Bain, an engineer, later wrote two books - "Celtic Knotwork" and "Celtic Key Patterns" that were intended to simplify the creation of knotwork and keypattern designs by using grid lines and diagonals rather than the mathematical formulae applied by his father.

The majority of Bain's surviving artworks are curated by the Groam House Museum in Rosemarkie, Scotland.

== A Recognised Collection of National Significance for Scotland ==
George Bain's archive of drawings, designs and artefacts is now cared for by Groam House Museum. The collection was awarded Recognised Collection of National Significance for Scotland status by Museums Galleries Scotland in 2013. The George Bain Collection website can be found here Digital archive and online community sharing the creativity of Celtic art.

== See also ==
- List of Hiberno-Saxon illustrated manuscripts
- Celtic Christianity
- Insular art
- Celtic knotwork
- Interlace (visual arts)
