= George Baines =

George Baines may refer to:

- George Washington Baines (1809–1882), American Baptist clergyman, professor and president of Baylor University
- George Baines (architect d.1934) (1851–1934), English architect
- George Grenfell Baines (1908–2003), English architect and town planner

== See also ==
- George Bain (disambiguation)
