= Interlace (art) =

Decorative crossing patterns in art

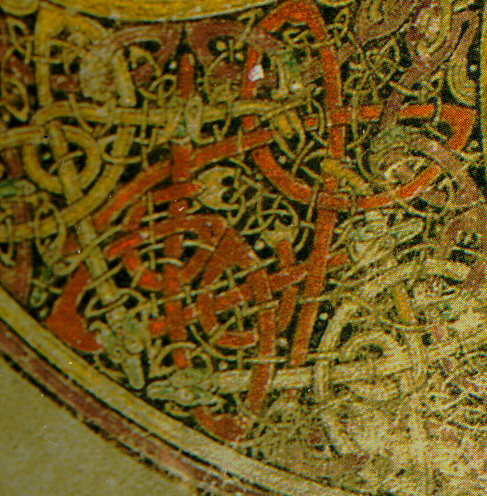
Detail of elaborate interlace from the Book of Kells.

In the visual arts, interlace is a decorative element found in medieval art. In interlace, bands or portions of other motifs are looped, braided, and knotted in complex geometric patterns, often to fill a space. Interlacing is common in the Migration period art of Northern Europe, in the early medieval Insular art of Britain and Ireland, and Norse art of the Early Middle Ages, and in Islamic art.

Intricate braided and interlaced patterns, called plaits in British usage, first appeared in late Roman art in various parts of Europe, in mosaic floors and other media. Coptic manuscripts and textiles of 5th- and 6th-century Christian Egypt are decorated with broad-strand ribbon interlace ornament bearing a "striking resemblance" to the earliest types of knotwork found in the Insular art manuscripts of Ireland and the British Isles.

== History and application ==
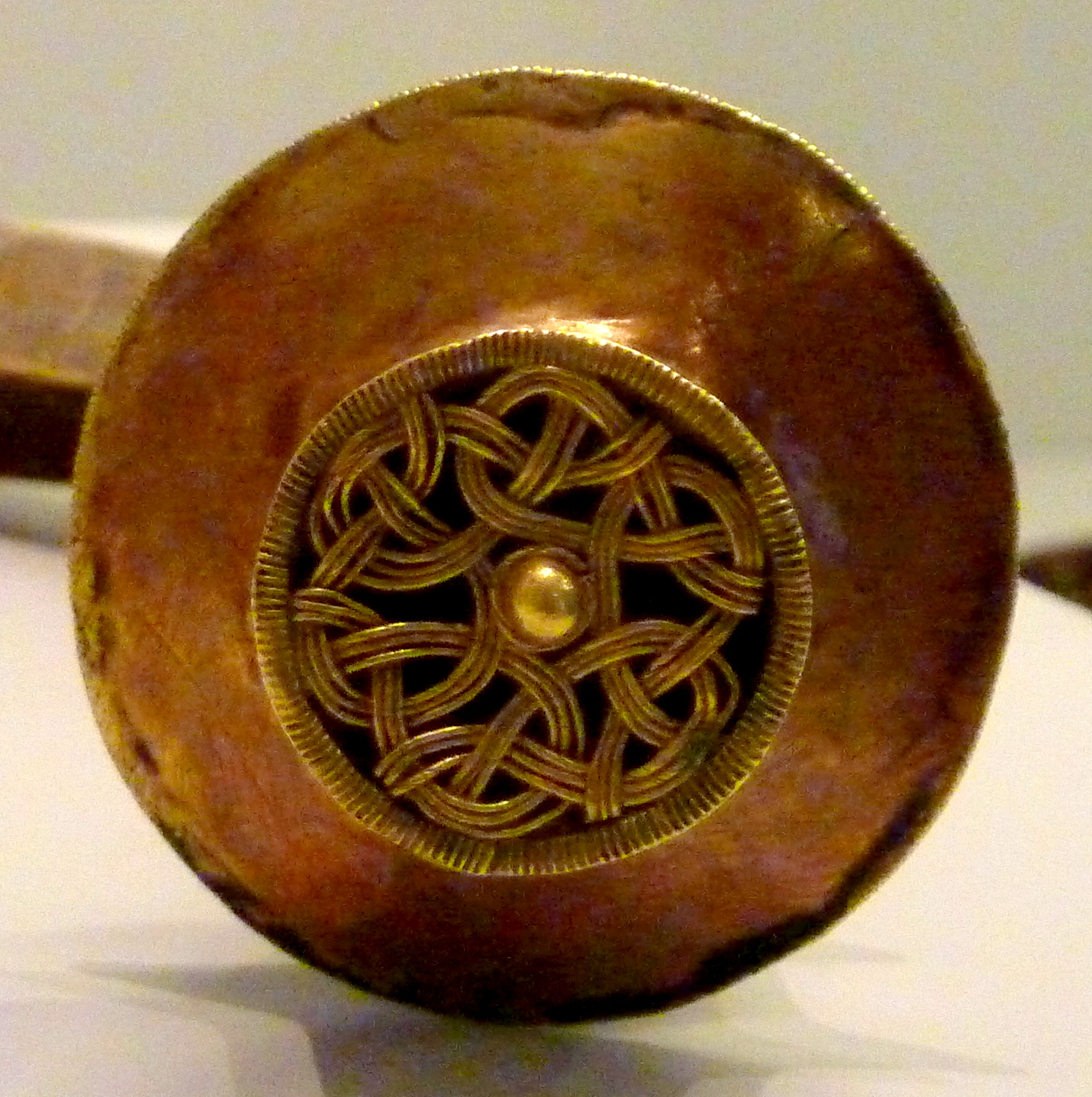
Interlace and rotational symmetry: Iron Age Torque de Foxados, Museo de Pontevedra, Galicia

=== Northern Europe ===
Interlace is a key feature of the "Style II" animal style decoration of Migration Period art, and is found widely across Northern Europe, and was carried by the Lombards into Northern Italy. Typically the long "ribbons" eventually terminate in an animal's head. By about 700 it becomes less common in most of Europe, but continues to develop in the British Isles and Scandinavia, where it is found on metalwork, woodcarving, runestones, high crosses, and illuminated manuscripts of the 7th to 12th centuries. Artist George Bain has characterised the early Insular knotwork found in the 7th-century Book of Durrow and the Durham Cathedral Gospel Book fragment as "broken and rejoined" braids. Whether Coptic braid patterns were transmitted directly to Hiberno-Scottish monasteries from the eastern Mediterranean or came via Lombardic Italy is uncertain. Art historian James Johnson Sweeney argued for direct communication between the scriptoria of Early Christian Ireland and the Coptic monasteries of Egypt.

This new style featured elongated beasts intertwined into symmetrical shapes, and can be dated to the mid-7th century based on the accepted dating of examples in the Sutton Hoo treasure. The most elaborate interlaced zoomorphics occur in Viking Age art of the Urnes style (arising before 1050), where tendrils of foliate designs intertwine with the stylized animals.

The full-flowering of Northern European interlace occurred in the Insular art of the British Isles, where the animal style ornament of Northern Europe blended with ribbon knotwork and Christian influences in such works as the Book of Kells and the Cross of Cong. Whole carpet pages were illuminated with abstract patterns, including much use of interlace, and stone high crosses combined interlace panels with figurative ones. Insular interlace was copied in continental Europe, closely in the Franco-Saxon school of the 8th to 11th centuries, and less so in other Carolingian schools of illumination, where the tendency was to foliate decorative forms. In Romanesque art these became typical, and the interlace generally much less complex. Some animal forms are also found.

=== Islamic art ===
Geometric interlacing patterns are common in Islamic ornament. They can be considered a particular type of arabesque. Umayyad architectural elements such as floor mosaics, window grilles, carvings and wall paintings, and decorative metal work of the 8th to 10th centuries are followed by the intricate interlacings common in later medieval Islamic art. Interlaced elaborations are also found in Kufic calligraphy.

=== Southern Europe ===
Interlace and knotwork are often found in Byzantine art, continuing Roman usage, but they are not given great prominence. One notable example of a widespread local usage of interlace is the three-ribbon interlace found in the early medieval Croatia on stone carvings from the 9th to 11th centuries.

Interlaces were widely used in times of the Serbian Morava architectural school from the 14th to 15th century, appearing on and within churches and monasteries as well as in religious literature; however, earlier examples of interlace motifs, such as the pre-Romanesque triple-strand plait found in St. Peter’s Church, demonstrate that this decorative tradition in Serbian art dates back at least to the early 9th century.

Interlaces are also an important ornament used in Brâncovenesc architecture, an architectural style that evolved in Romania during the administration of Prince Constantin Brâncoveanu in the late 17th and early 18th centuries. Later, in the late 19th century and the first half of the 20th, it will be reused in Romanian Revival architecture.

== Gallery ==
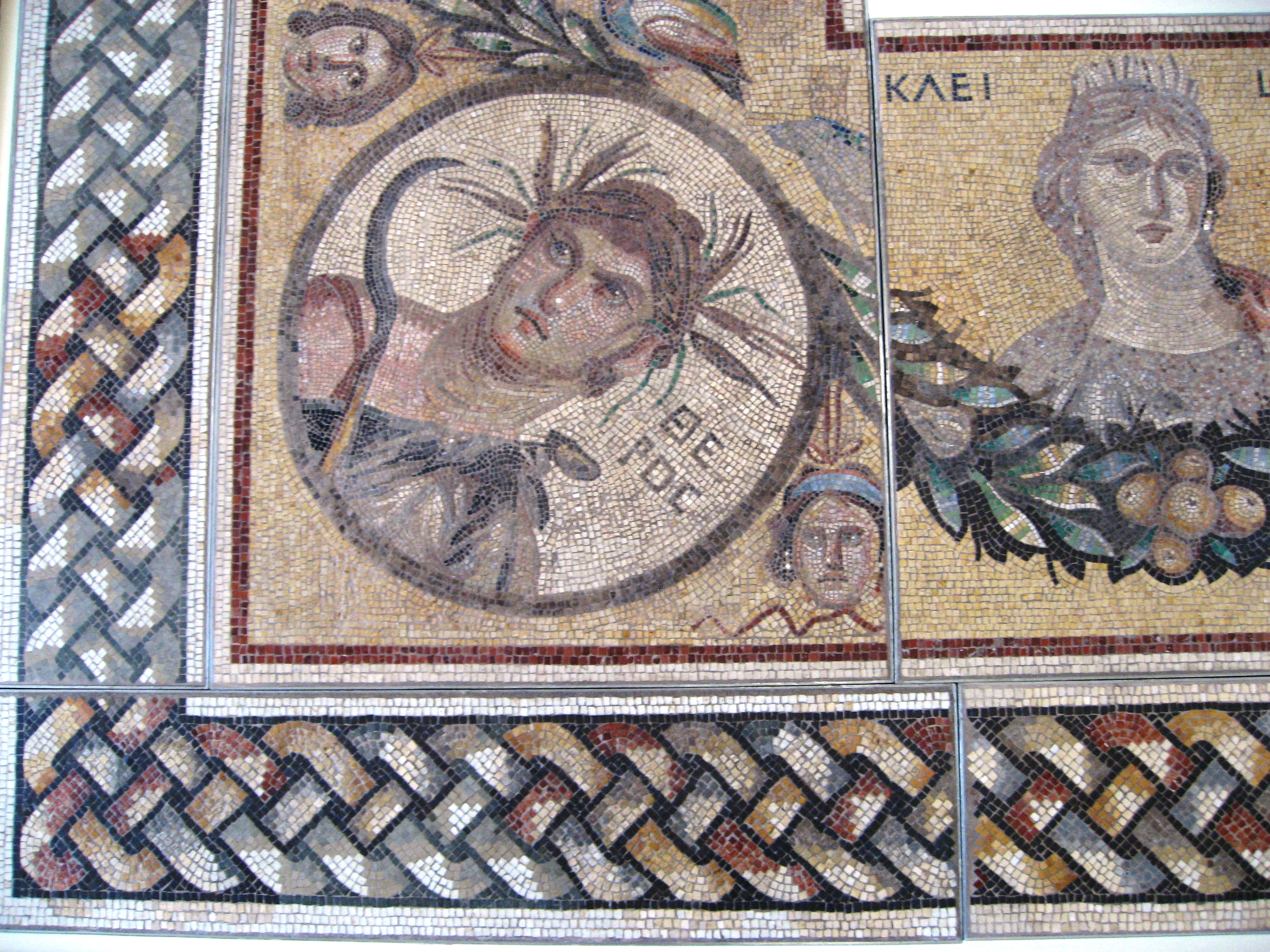
Roman interlace on a floor from a private house in Gerasa, Jordan, 2nd century, mosaic, Pergamon Museum, Berlin

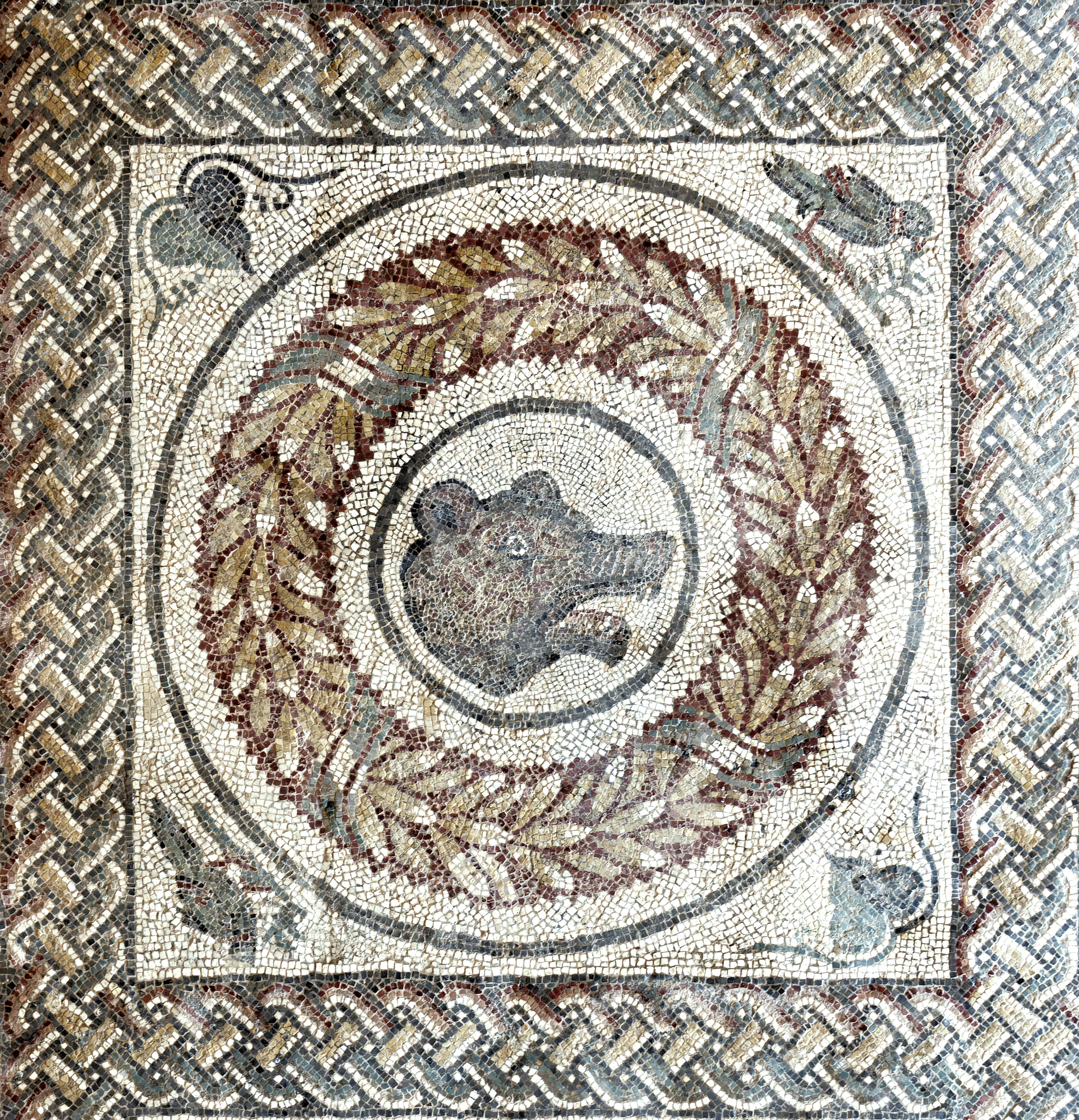
Roman interlaces on a mosaic floor, Villa Romana del Casale, near Piazza Armerina, Italy, unknown architect, early 4th century

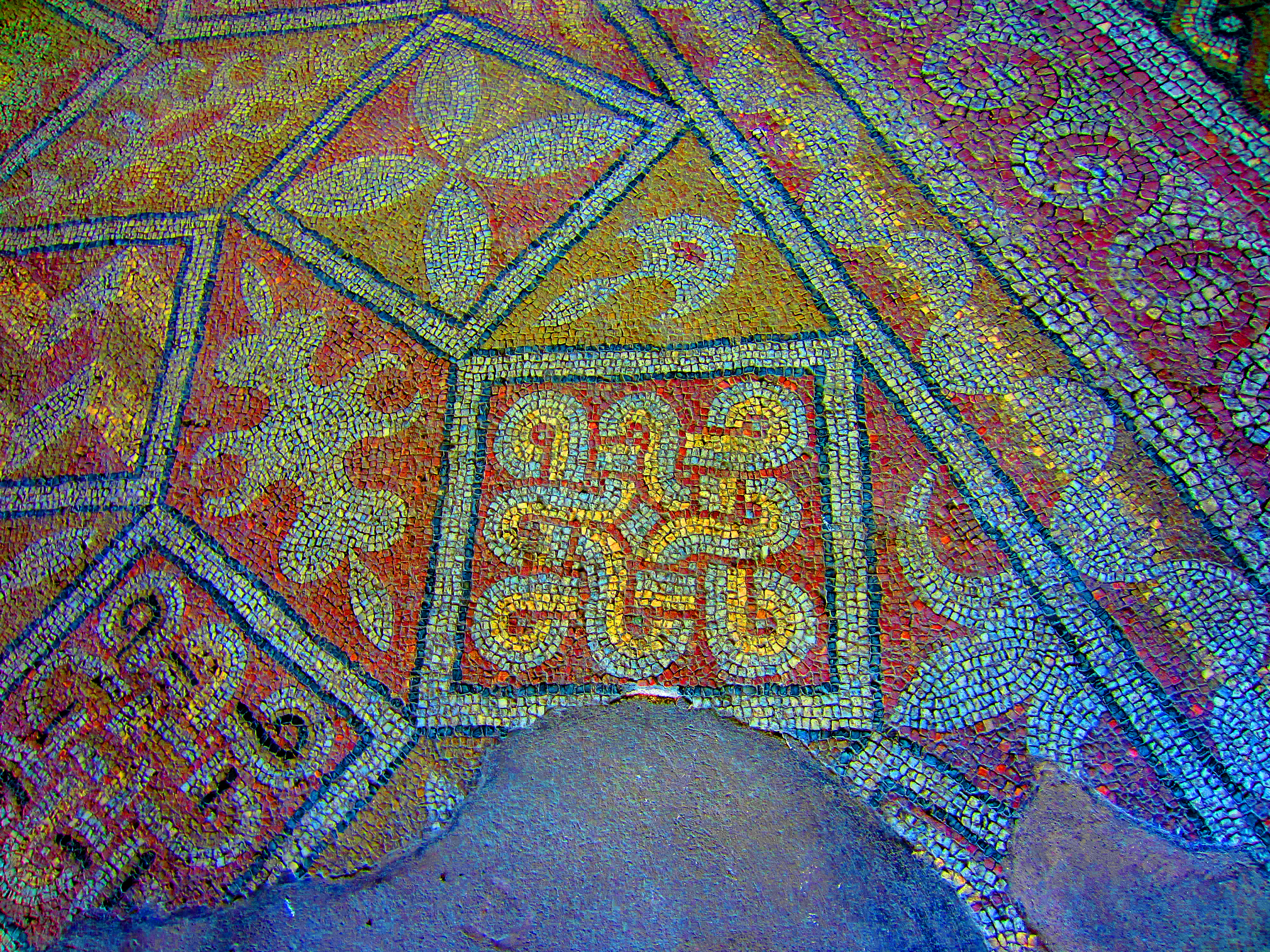
Roman interlaces on a floor, 4th-6th centuries, mosaic, Constanța History and Archaeology Museum, Constanța, Romania

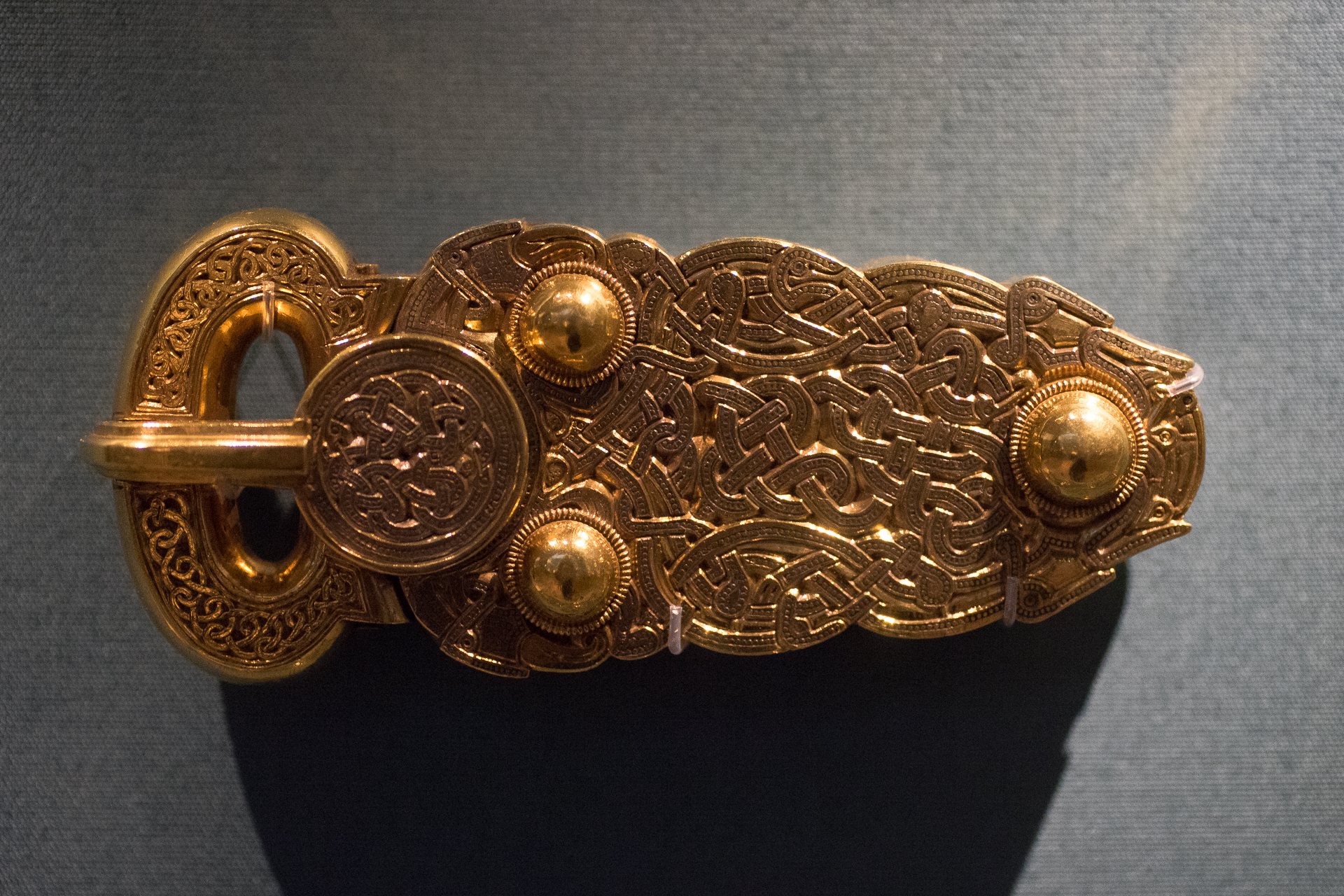
Insular belt buckle from Sutton Hoo, 580–620, gold and niello, British Museum, London

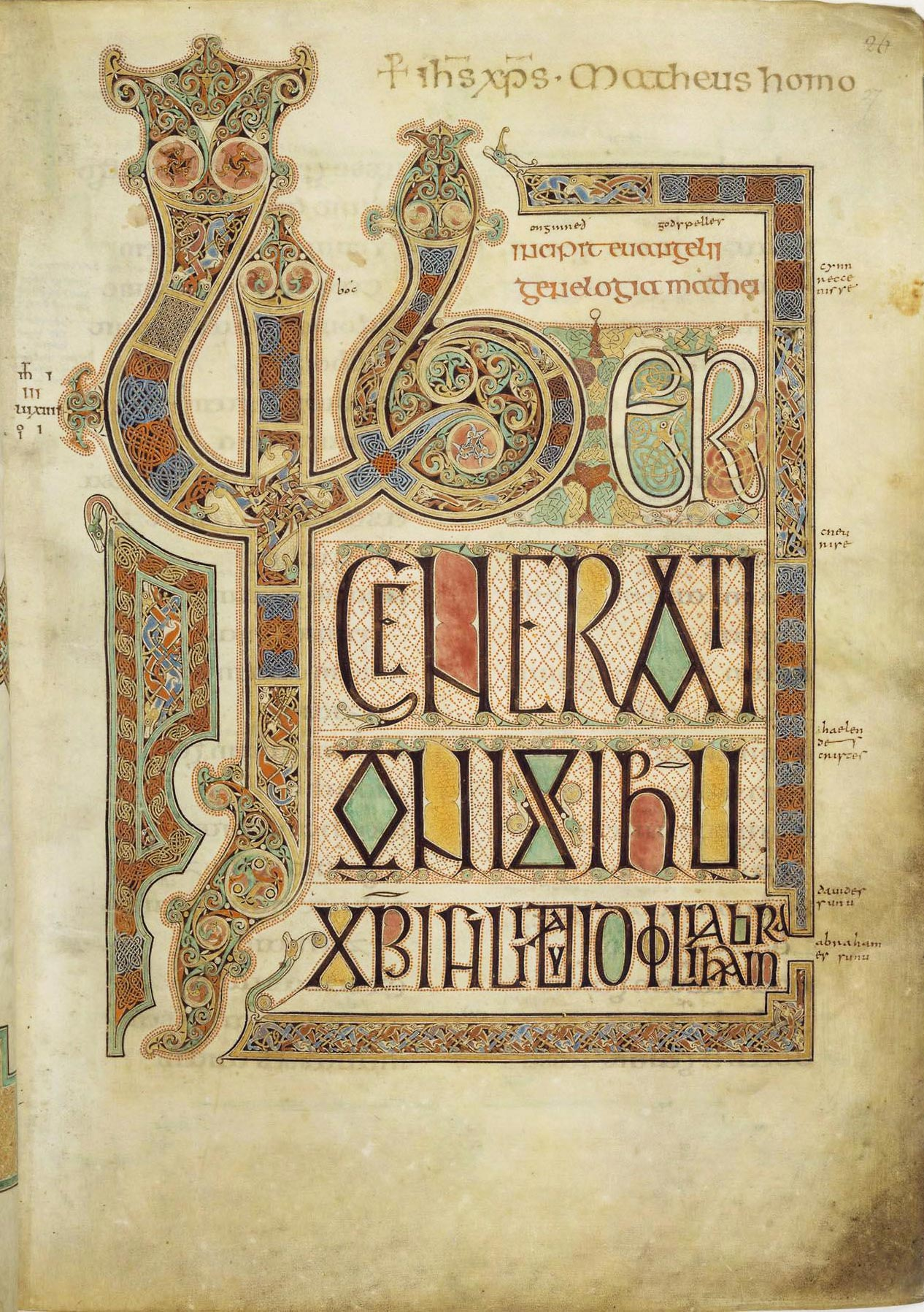
Insular animal and knot interlace in the Lindisfarne Gospels, early 8th century, ink and pigments on paper, British Library, London

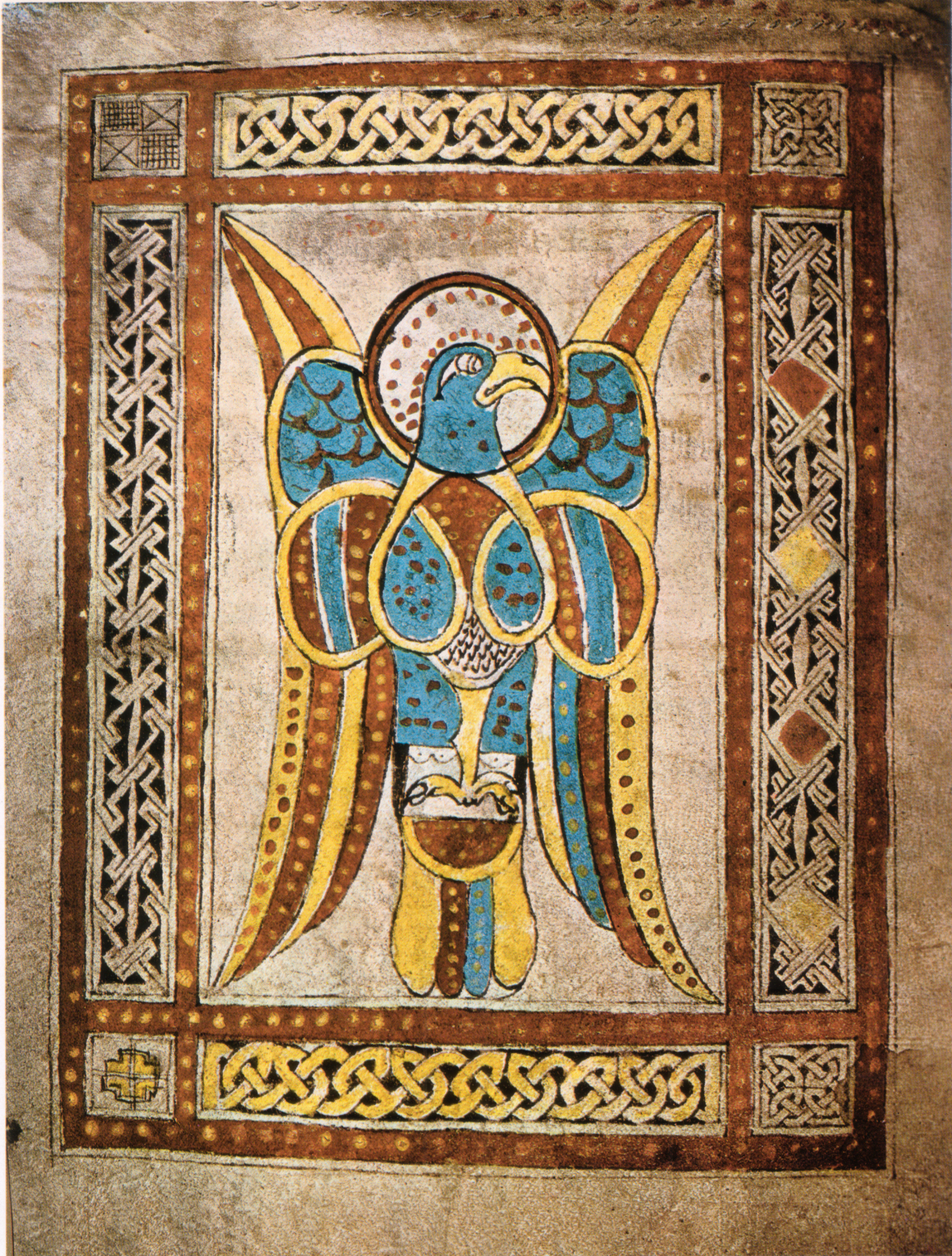
Page from the Book of Dimma with simple Insular interlace borders, 8th century, illuminated manuscript, Library of Trinity College Dublin, Dublin, Ireland

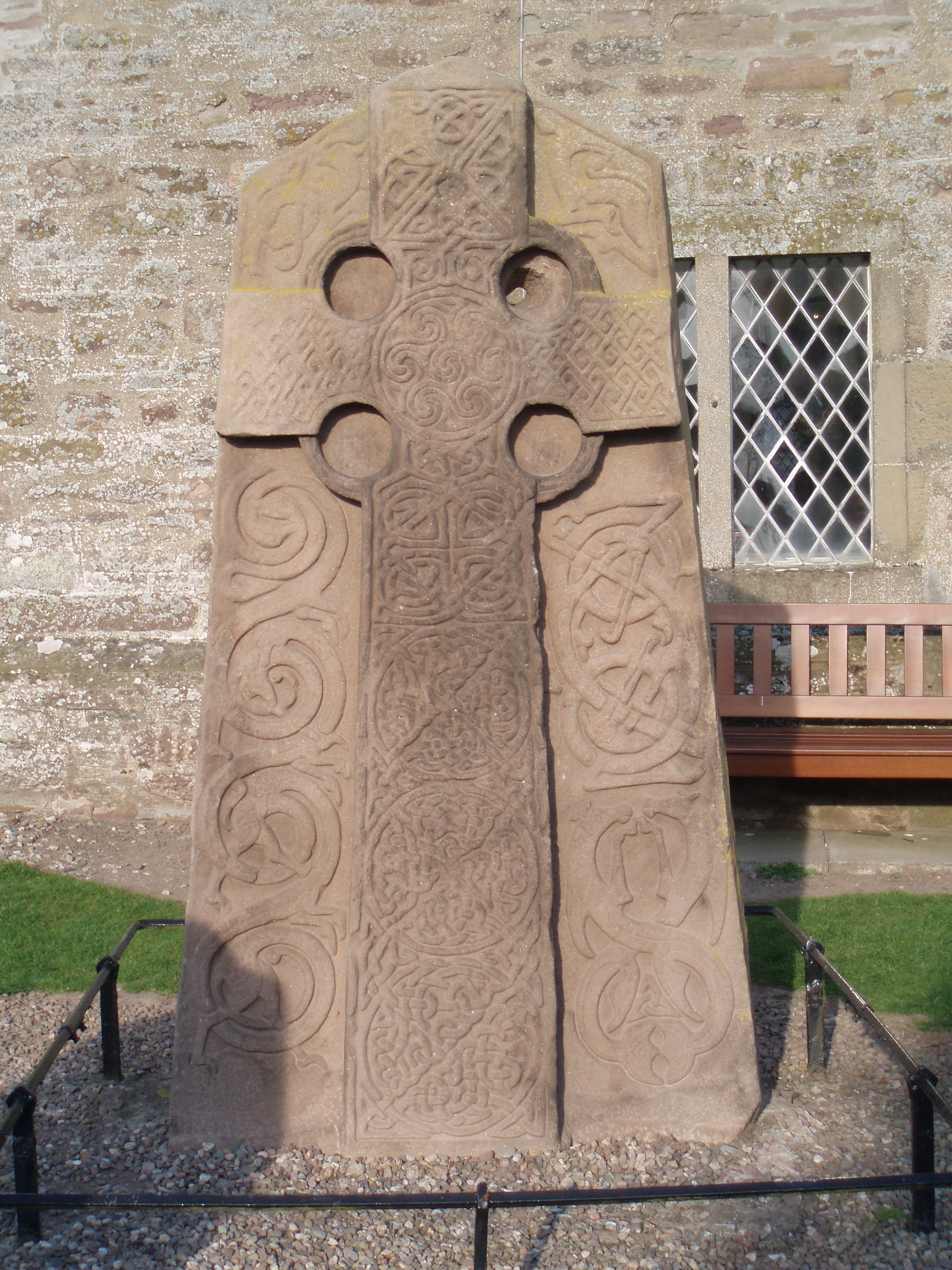
Cross decorated with Insular interlaces, part of the Aberlemno Sculptured Stones, unknown sculptor, c.800, sandstone, Aberlemo, Scotland, UK

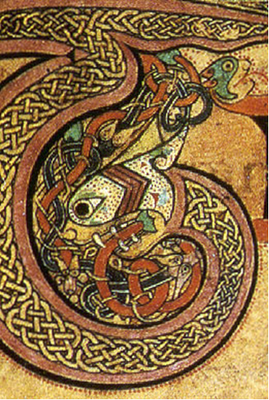
Detail of decorated Insular initial "T" with ribbon interlace filling and interlaced animal motif, Book of Kells, c.800, illuminated manuscript, Library of Trinity College Dublin

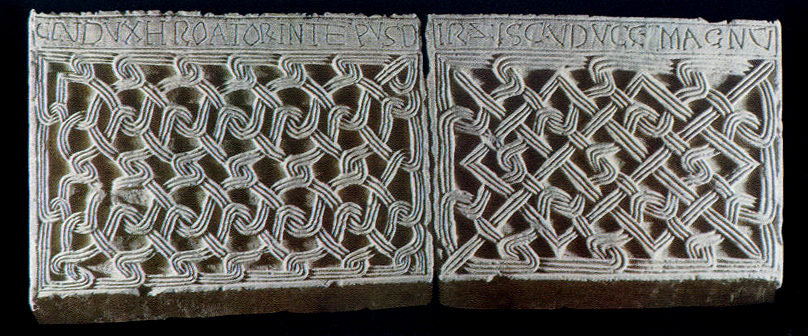
Inscription of Stephen Držislav of Croatia, an example of the three-strand Croatian interlace, 10th century, stone, Croatian Institute of History, Zagreb, Croatia

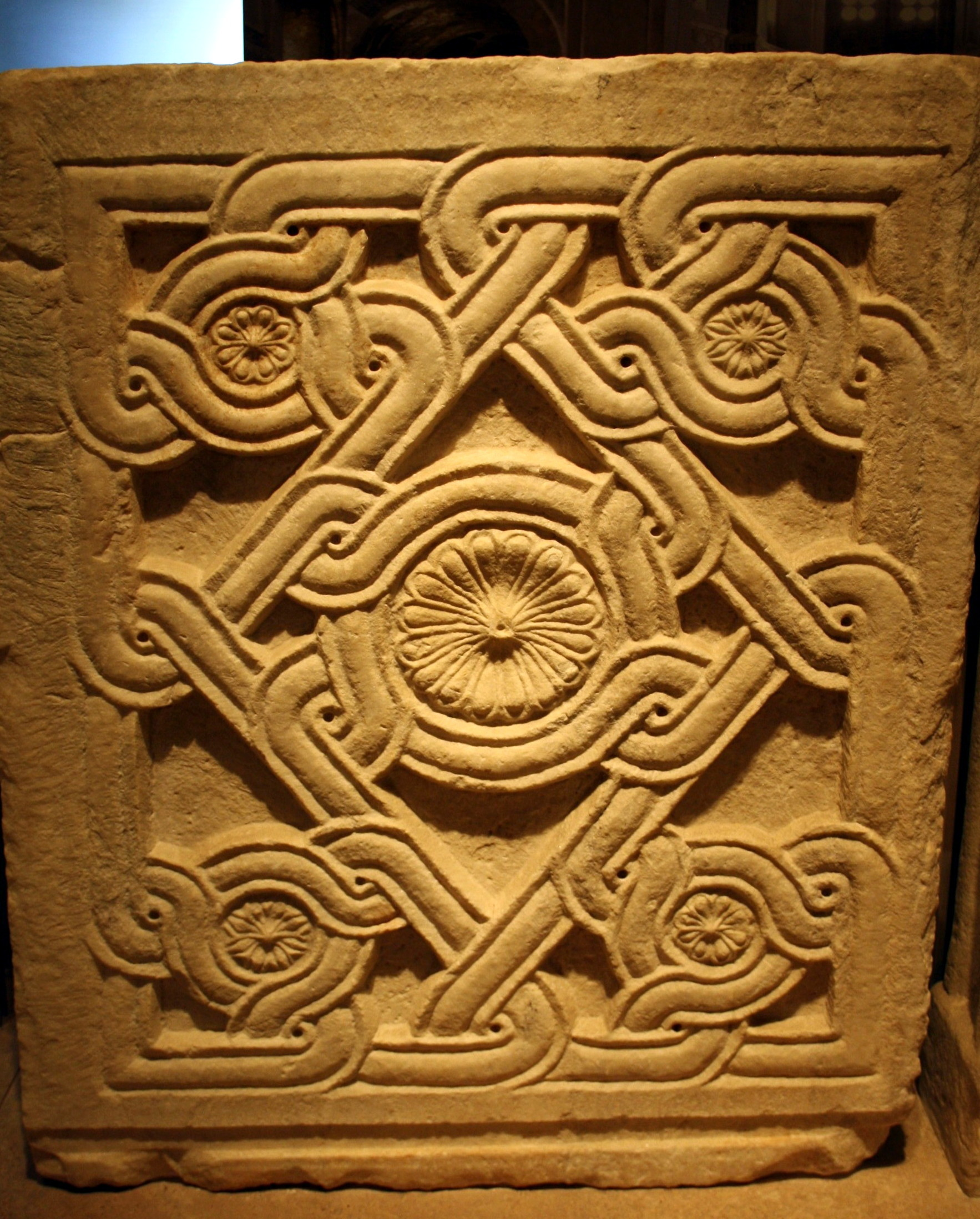
Byzantine interlaces on a slab, 11th century, marble, Byzantine and Christian Museum, Athens

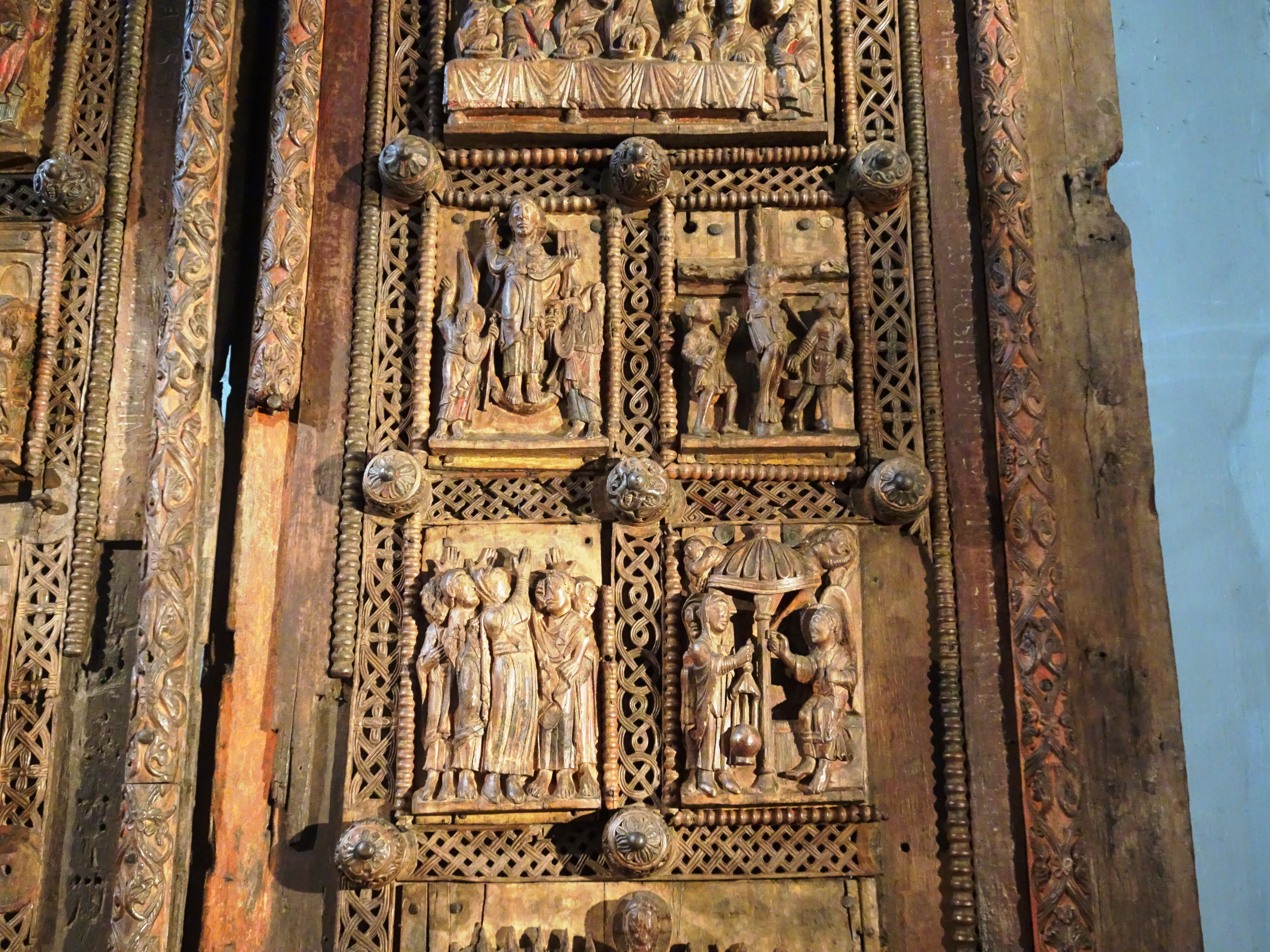
Romanesque interlaces on the only surviving original wooden door of St. Maria im Kapitol, Cologne, Germany, unknown architect or sculptor, c.1065

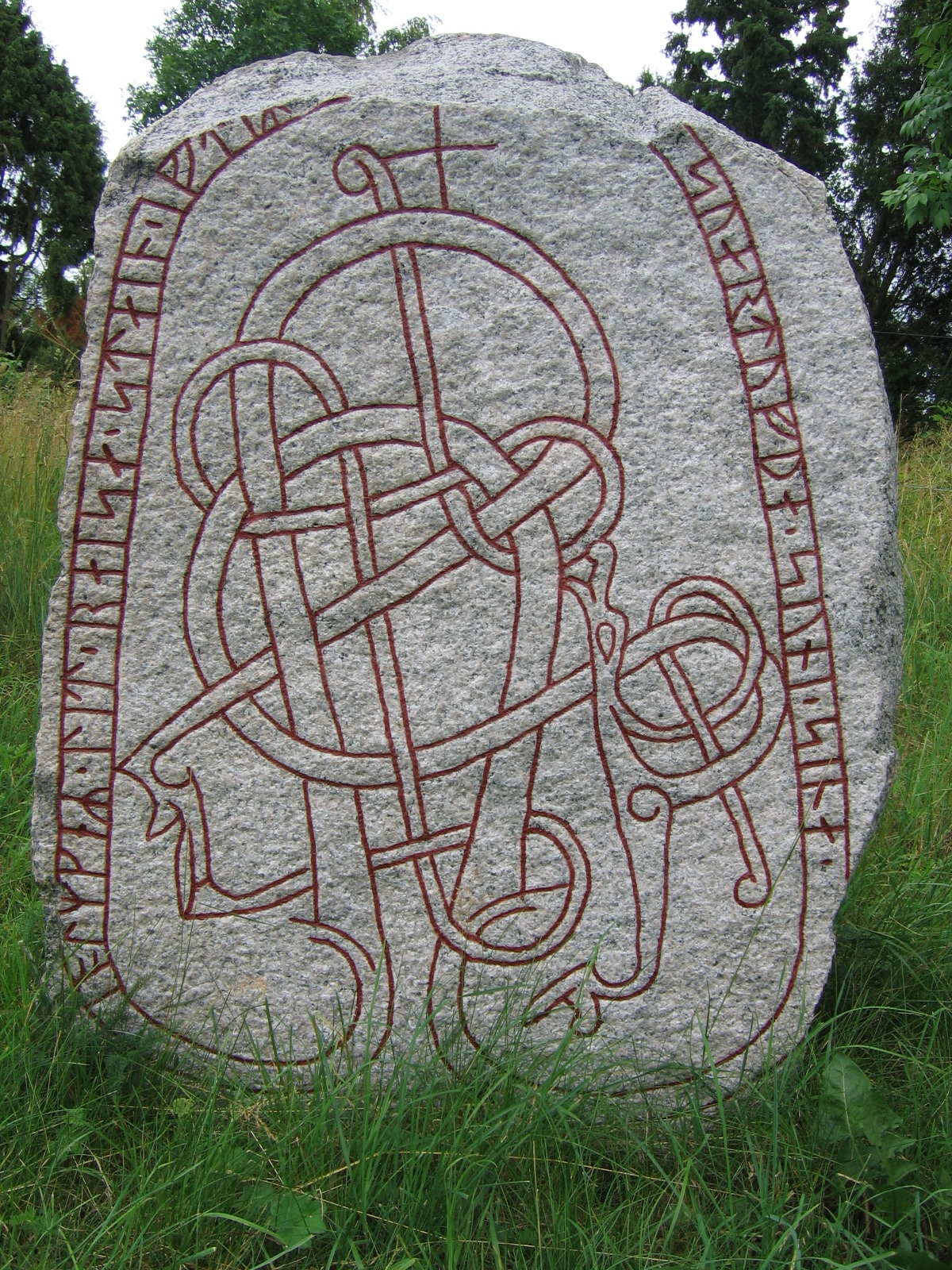
Uppland Runic Inscription 1014 with Viking interlaced animal, Uppland, Sweden, attributed to the runemaster Öpir, late 11th or early 12th century

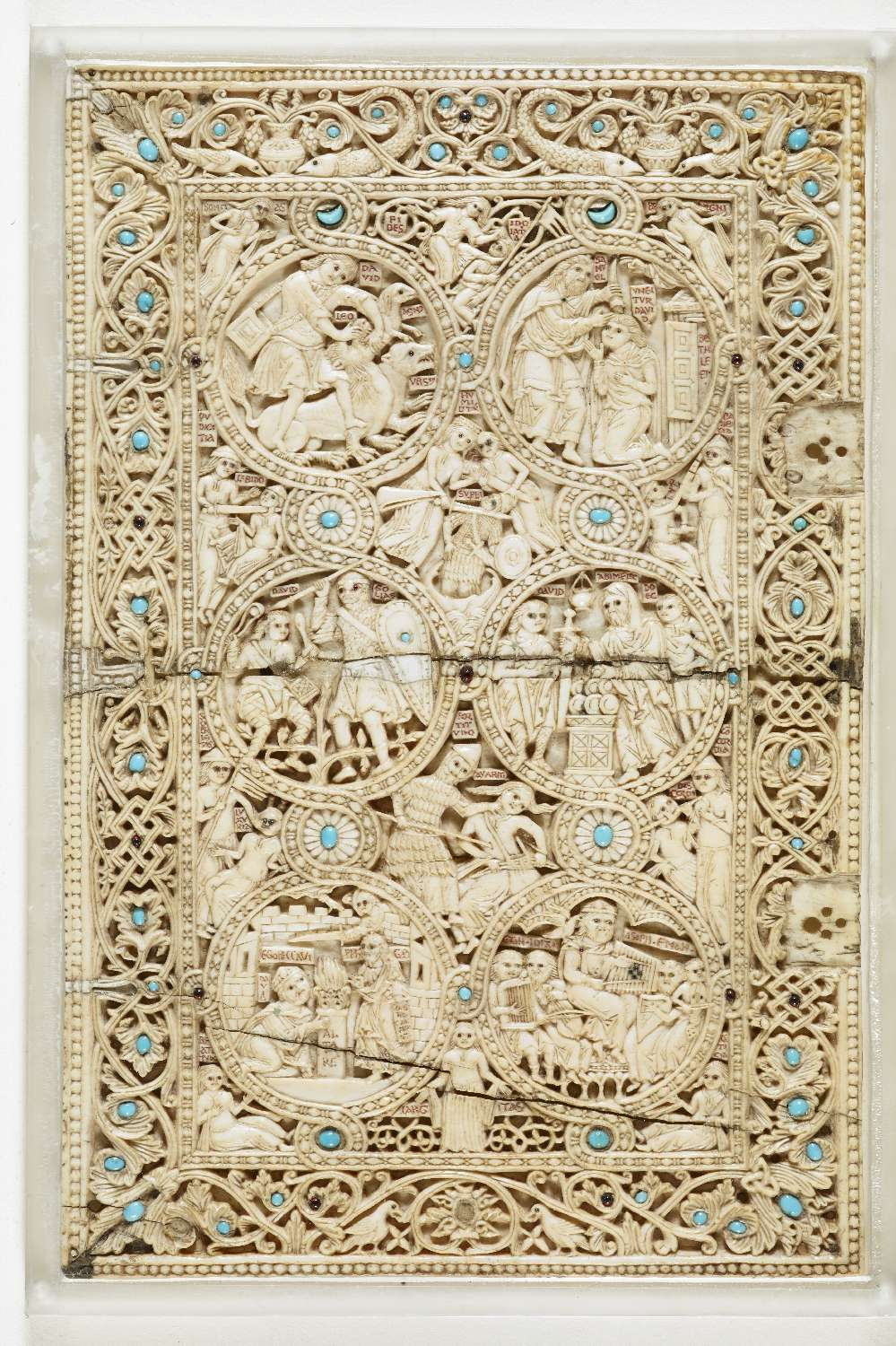
Byzantine interlaces on the cover of the Melisende Psalter, 1131-1143, ivory, British Library

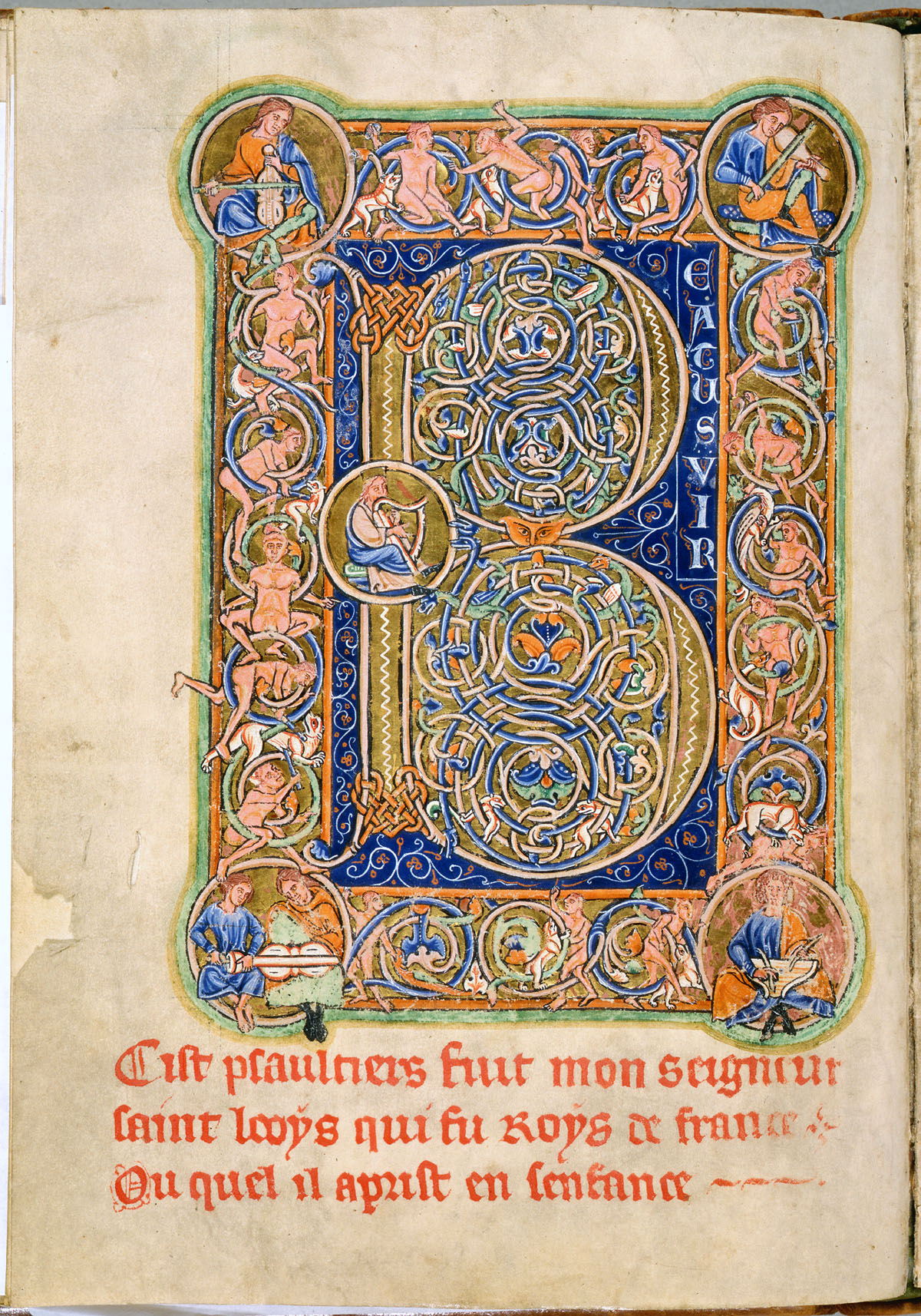
Romanesque interlace on an initial "inhabited" with figures on a page of the Leiden Saint Louis Psalter, 1190-1200, ink and painting on parchment, Leiden University Library, Leiden, Netherlands

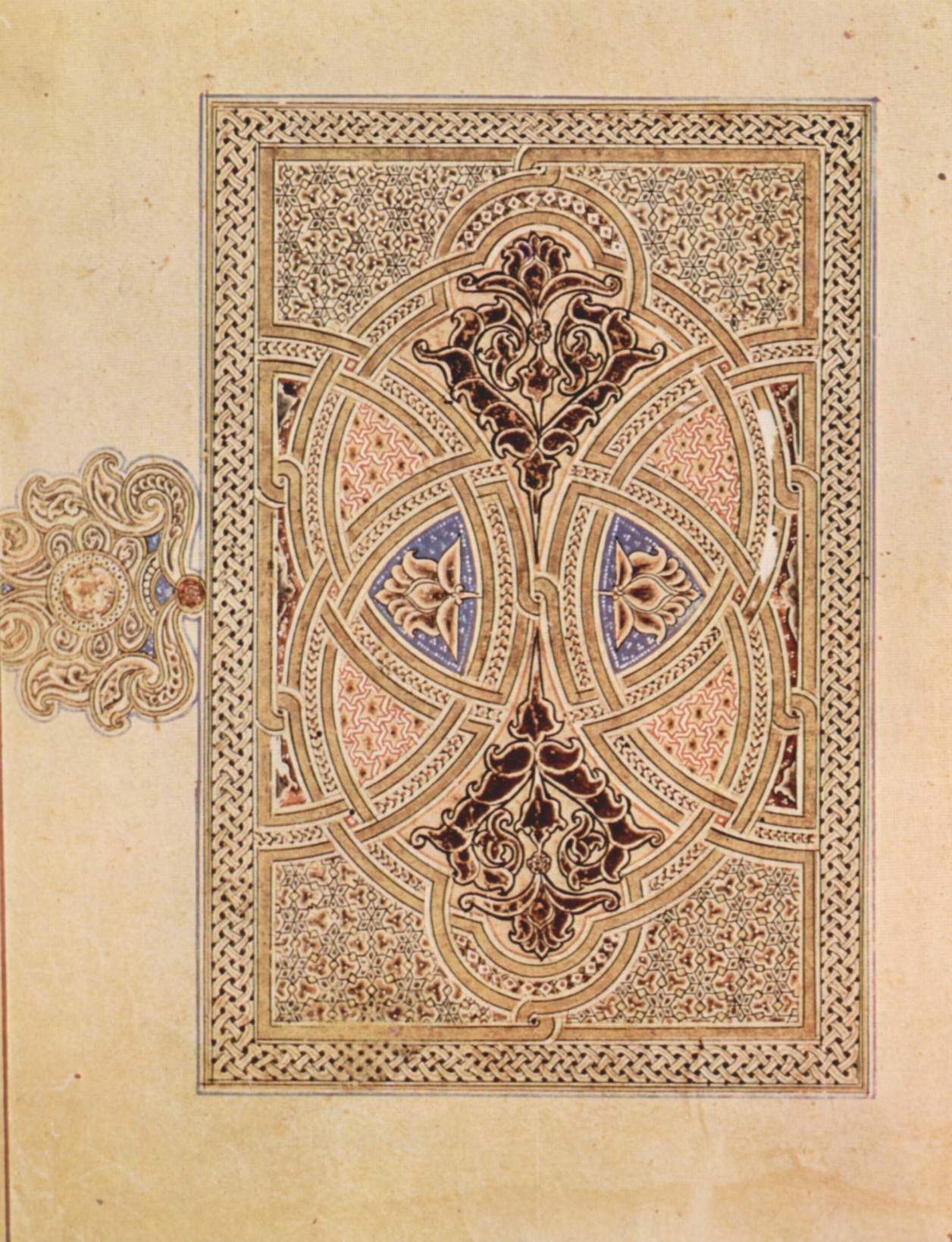
Islamic interlaces on a carpet page from the Ibn al-Bawwab Qur'an, by Ibn al-Bawwab, 11th century, ink and painting on paper, Chester Beatty Library, Dublin

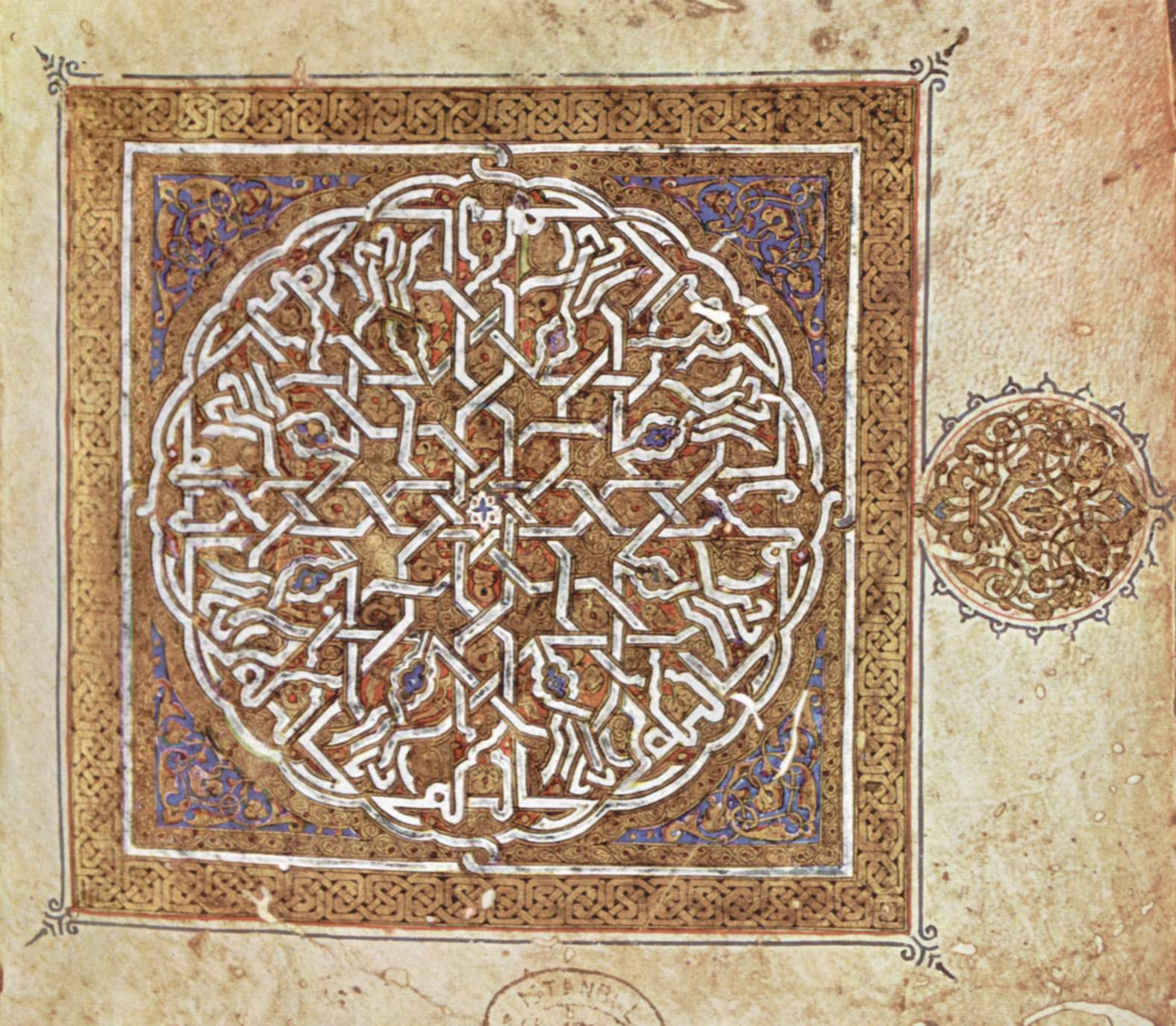
Folio from a manuscript of the Qur'an with Islamic interlaced border, 1182, ink and painting on parchment, Istanbul University Library, Istanbul, Turkey

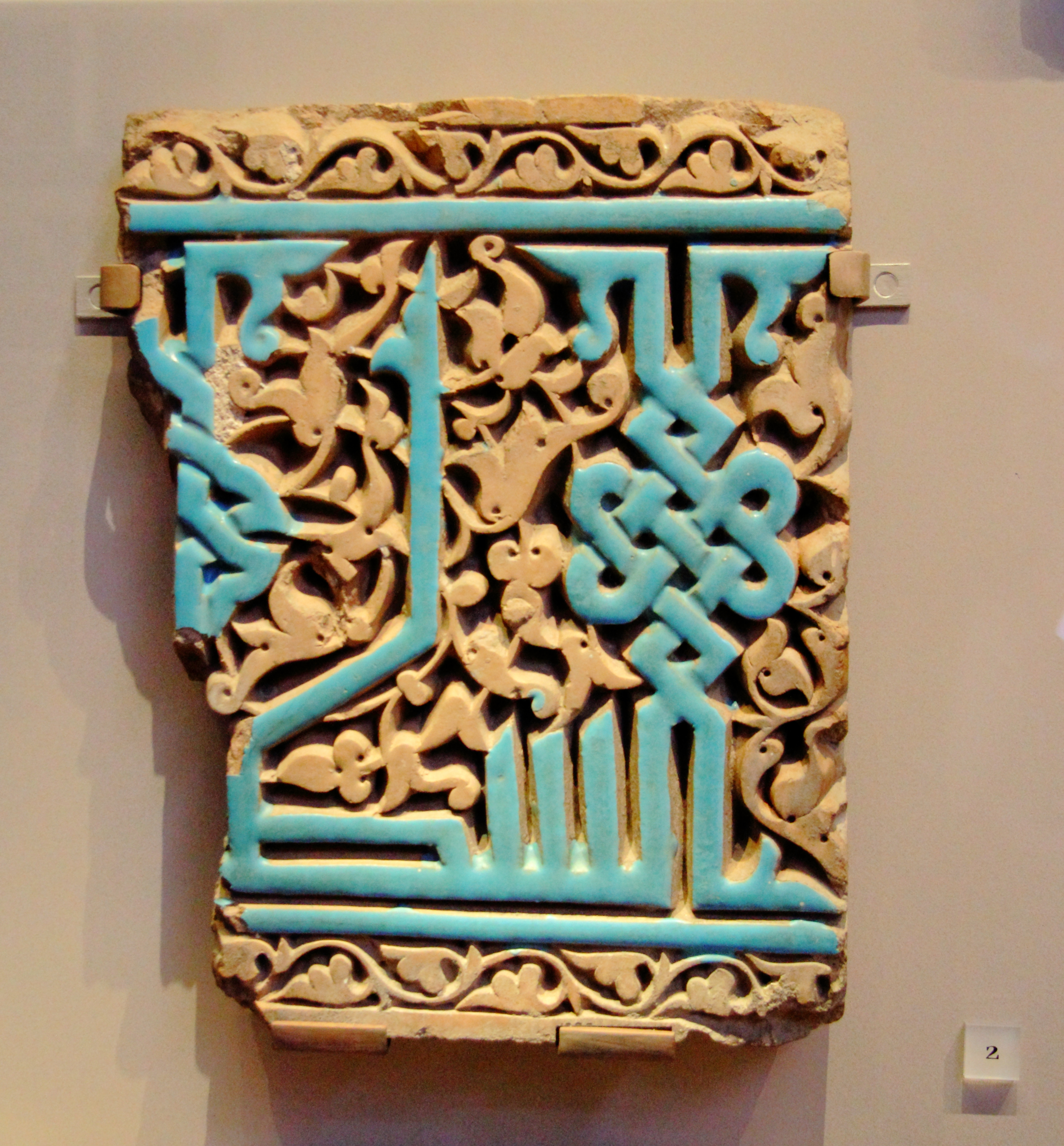
Islamic interlace on a tile from an architectural frieze, 1380-1420, glazed earthenware, Victoria and Albert Museum, London

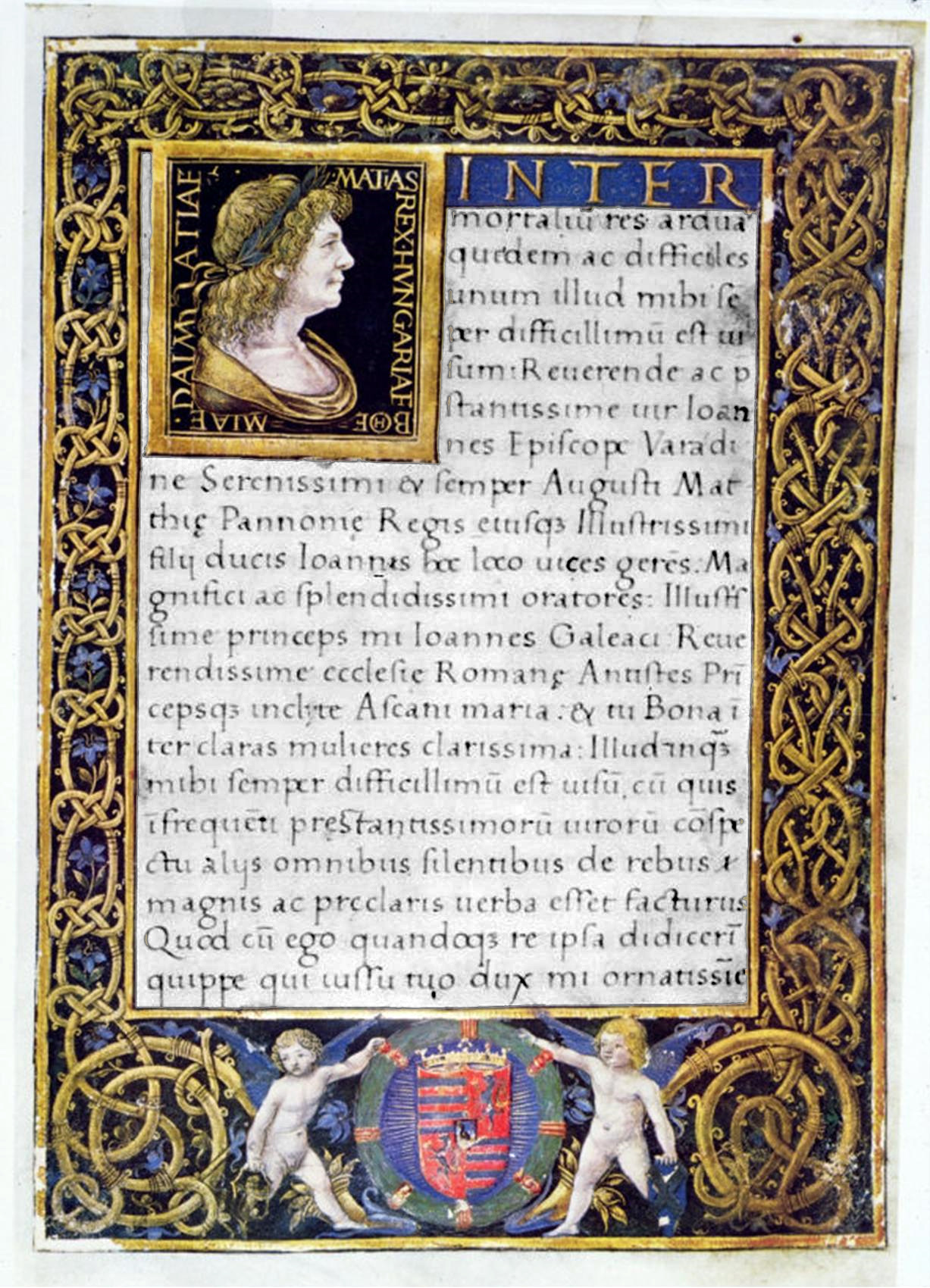
Renaissance interlaces on a page from a codex with a portrait of Matthias Corvinus, by Giovanni Ambrogio de Predis, 16th century, illuminated manuscript, unknown location

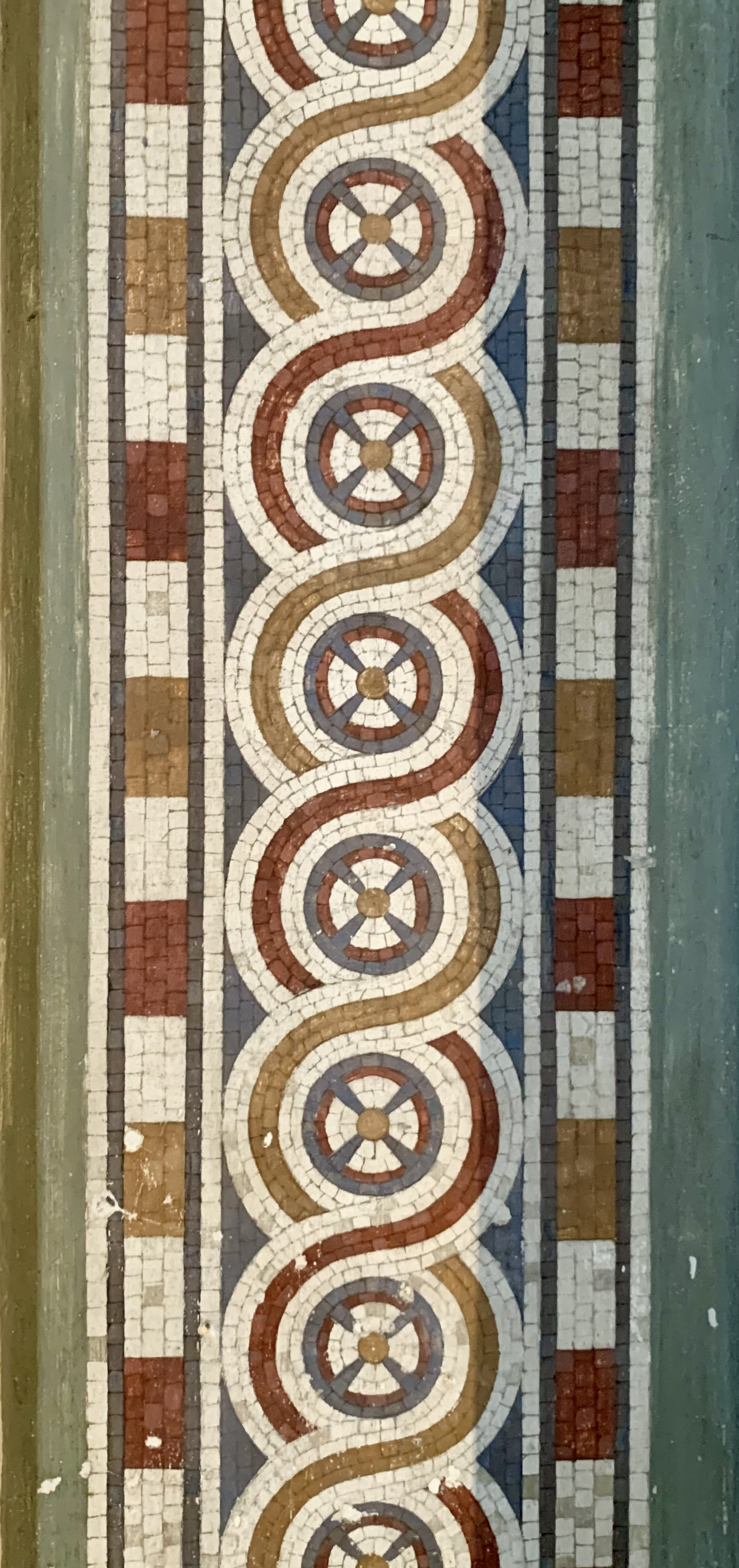
Neoclassical interlace on a wall in the Neues Museum, Berlin, by Friedrich August Stüler, 1843-1855

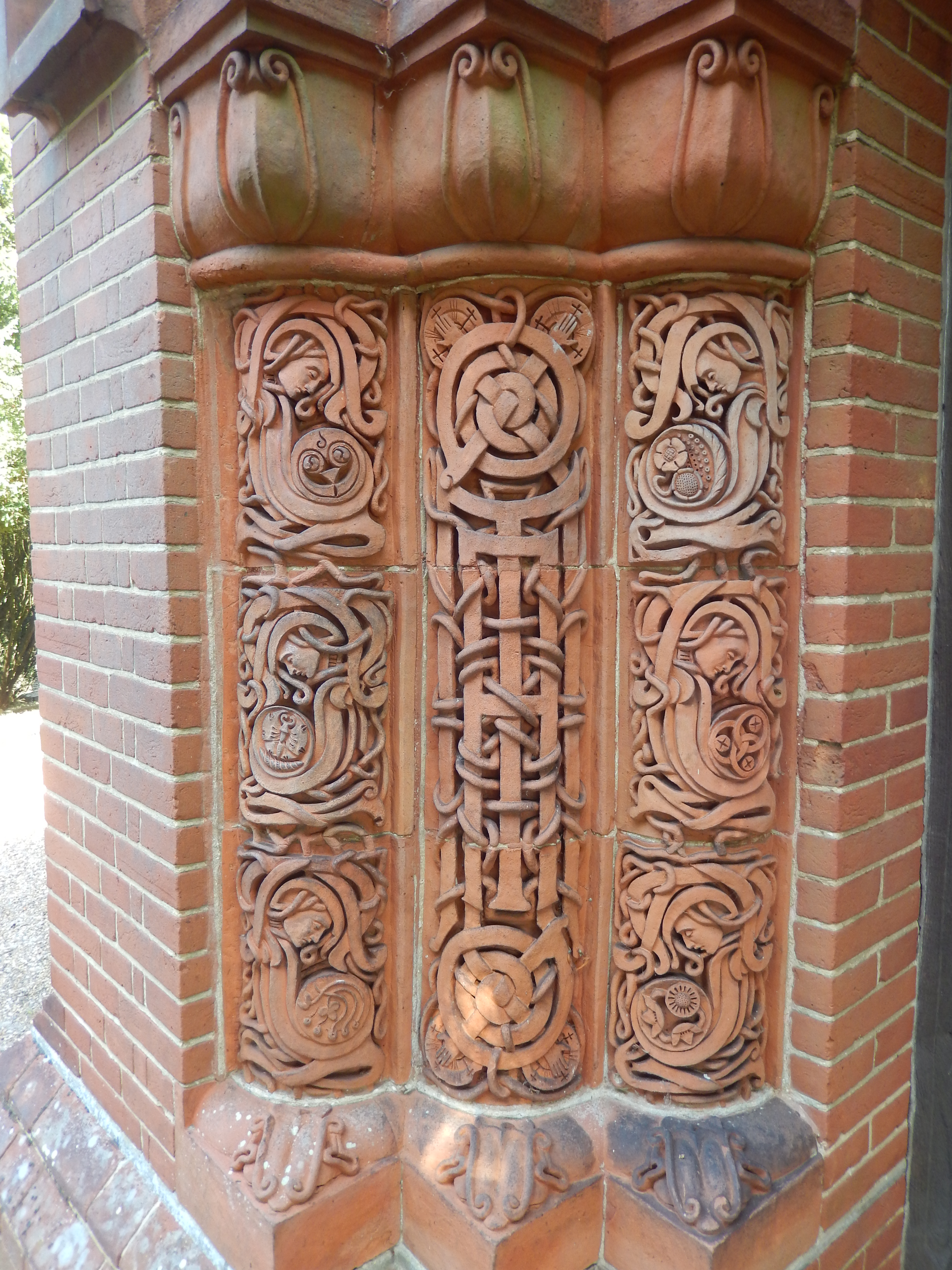
Art Nouveau interlaces on the shafts of the entrance portal columns of the Watts Cemetery Chapel, village cemetery of Compton, Guildford, England, inspired by Insular art, by Mary Fraser Tytler and George Redmayne, 1898

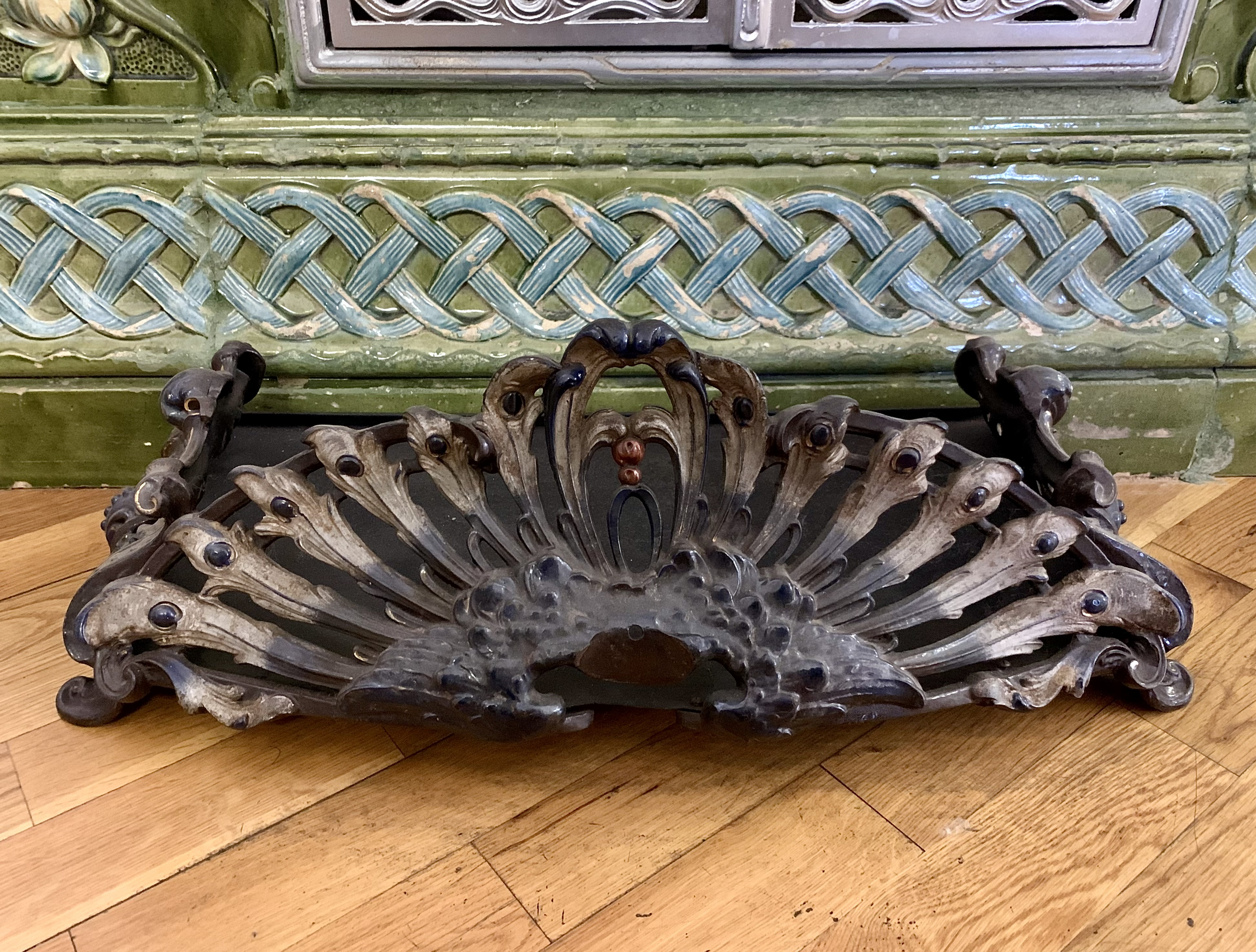
Art Nouveau interlace on a stove in the George Severeanu Museum, Bucharest, Romania, unknown architect, c.1900

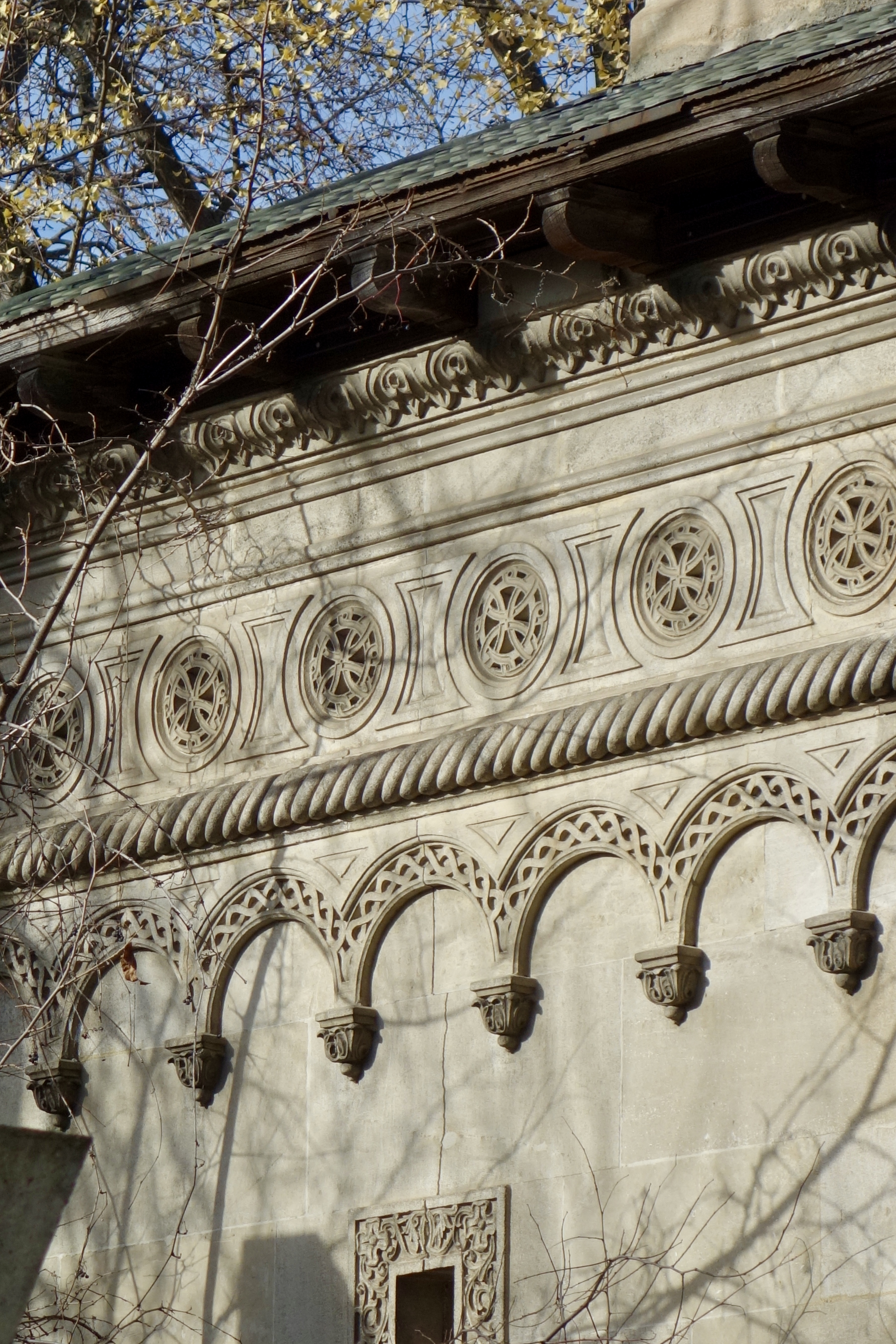
Romanian Revival interlaces on the Vlahuți-Slătineanu Grave, Bellu Cemetery, Bucharest, by Grigore Cerkez, 1913

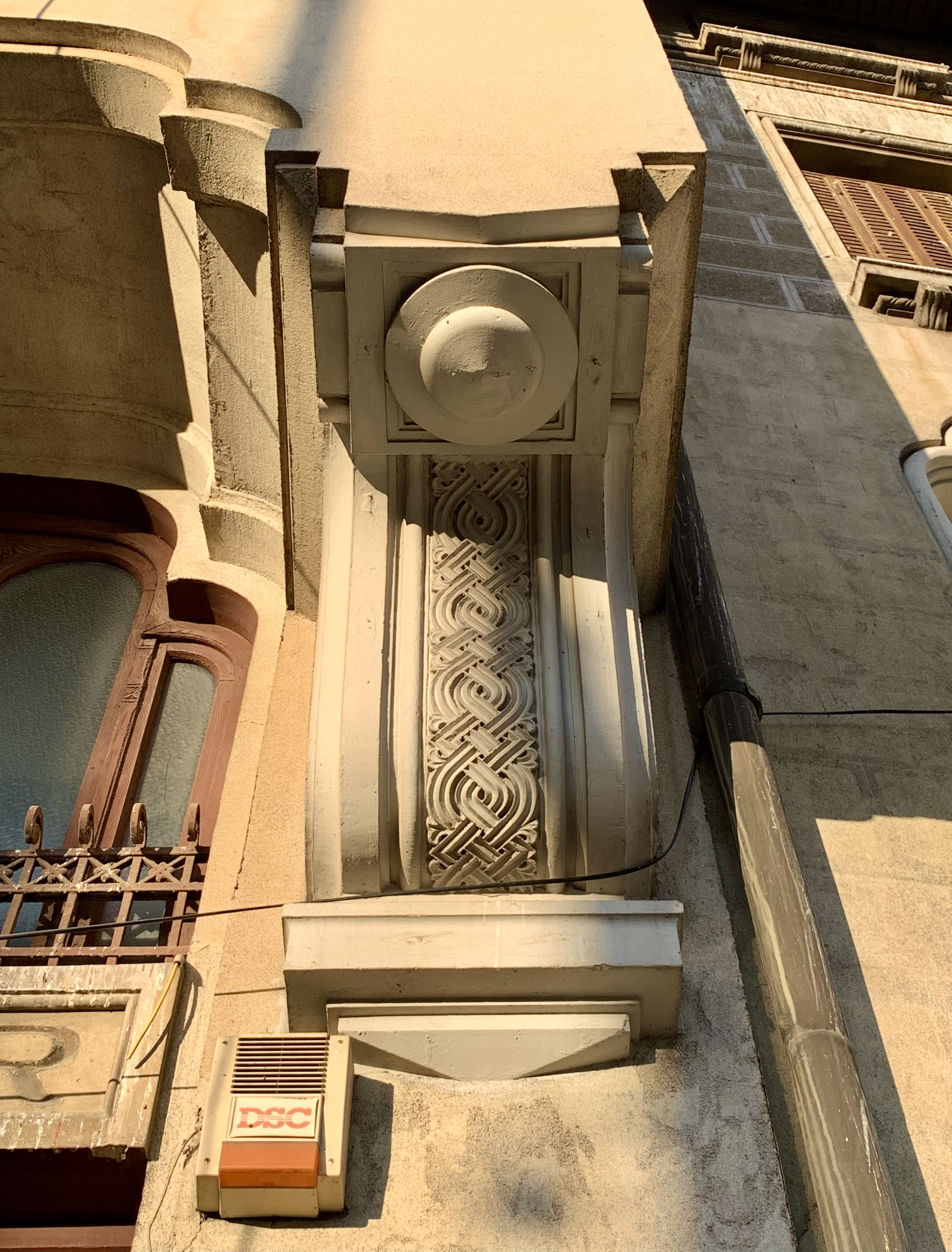
Romanian Revival interlaces on a corbel of Strada Vasile Lascăr no. 76, Bucharest, by Ștefan Ciocârlan, 1925

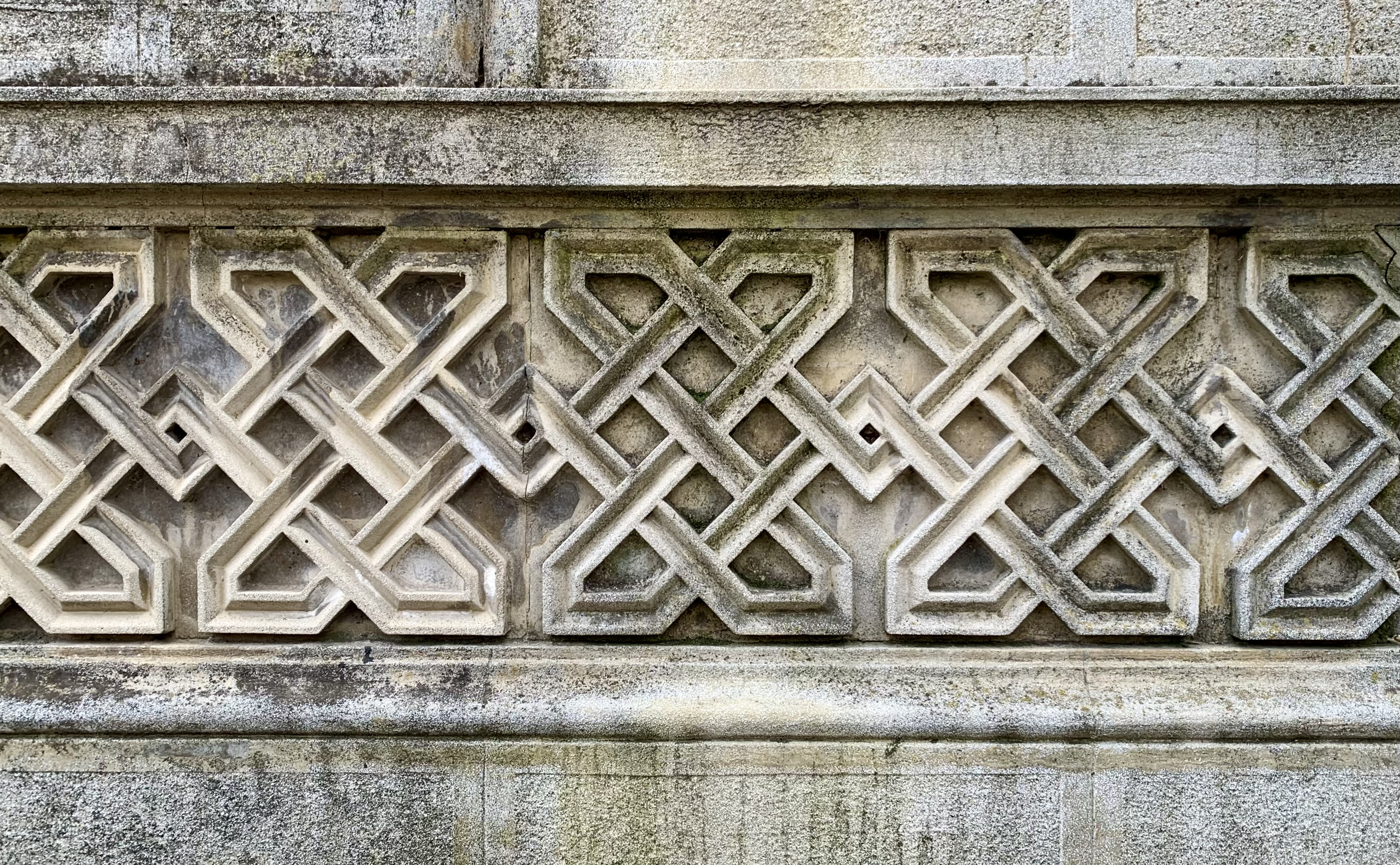
Romanian Revival interlaces on the Dimitrie Vișinescu Family Grave, Bellu Cemetery, unknown architect, c.1930
