= George Bain =

George Bain may refer to:

- George Bain (artist) (1881–1968), artist who became known as the father of modern Celtic design
- George Bain (journalist) (1920–2006), Canadian journalist
- Sir George Bain (academic) (born 1939), former president and Vice-Chancellor of Queen's University, Belfast
- George Grantham Bain (1865–1944), New Yorker news photographer
- George Bain (rugby league, born 1892) (1892–1948), Australian rugby league player
- George Bain (rugby league, born 1929) (1892–1998), Australian rugby league player

== See also ==
- George Baines (disambiguation)
