= Alexander Bain =

Alexander or Alex Bain may refer to:

- Alexander Bain (philosopher) (1818–1903), Scottish philosopher.
- Alexander Bain (inventor) (1810–1877), Scottish inventor and engineer
- Alex Bain (footballer) (Alexander Edward Bain, 1936–2014), British footballer
- Alex Bain (actor) (Alexander Anthony Keith Bain, born 2001), Coronation Street actor

== See also ==
- Alexander Bayne (died 1737), first tenant of the chair of Scots law at the University of Edinburgh
- Bain (surname)
