= Rosemarkie sculpture fragments =

Archaeological artifacts found in Scotland

Coordinates: 57°35′29″N 4°6′48″W

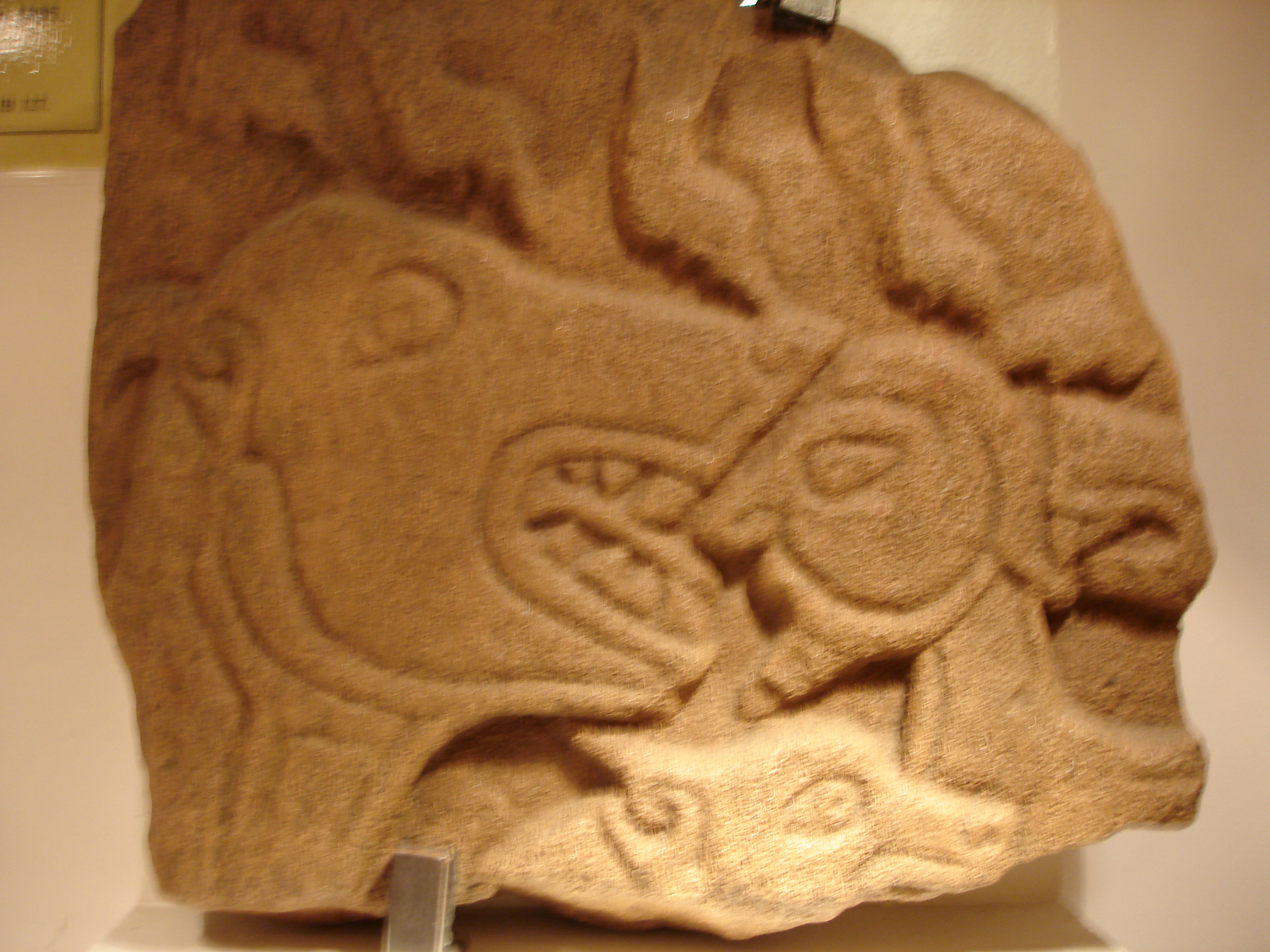
The so-called Daniel Stone.

The Rosemarkie sculpture fragments are the Pictish slabs and stone fragments other than the main Rosemarkie Stone which have been discovered in Rosemarkie, on the Black Isle of Easter Ross, Scotland. There are fourteen in all.

The so-called Daniel Stone is thought to depict the Old Testament story of Daniel in the Lion's Den.

The stones are all of likely Christian origin, and share a similar style with the art of Iona. Some of them may have been of funerary purpose, as coffin lids, while others may have formed part of a larger stone. These stones are usually displayed in the Groam House Museum of Rosemarkie.
