= Groam House Museum =

Museum in Highland, Scotland

Coordinates: 57.59126°N 4.11481°W

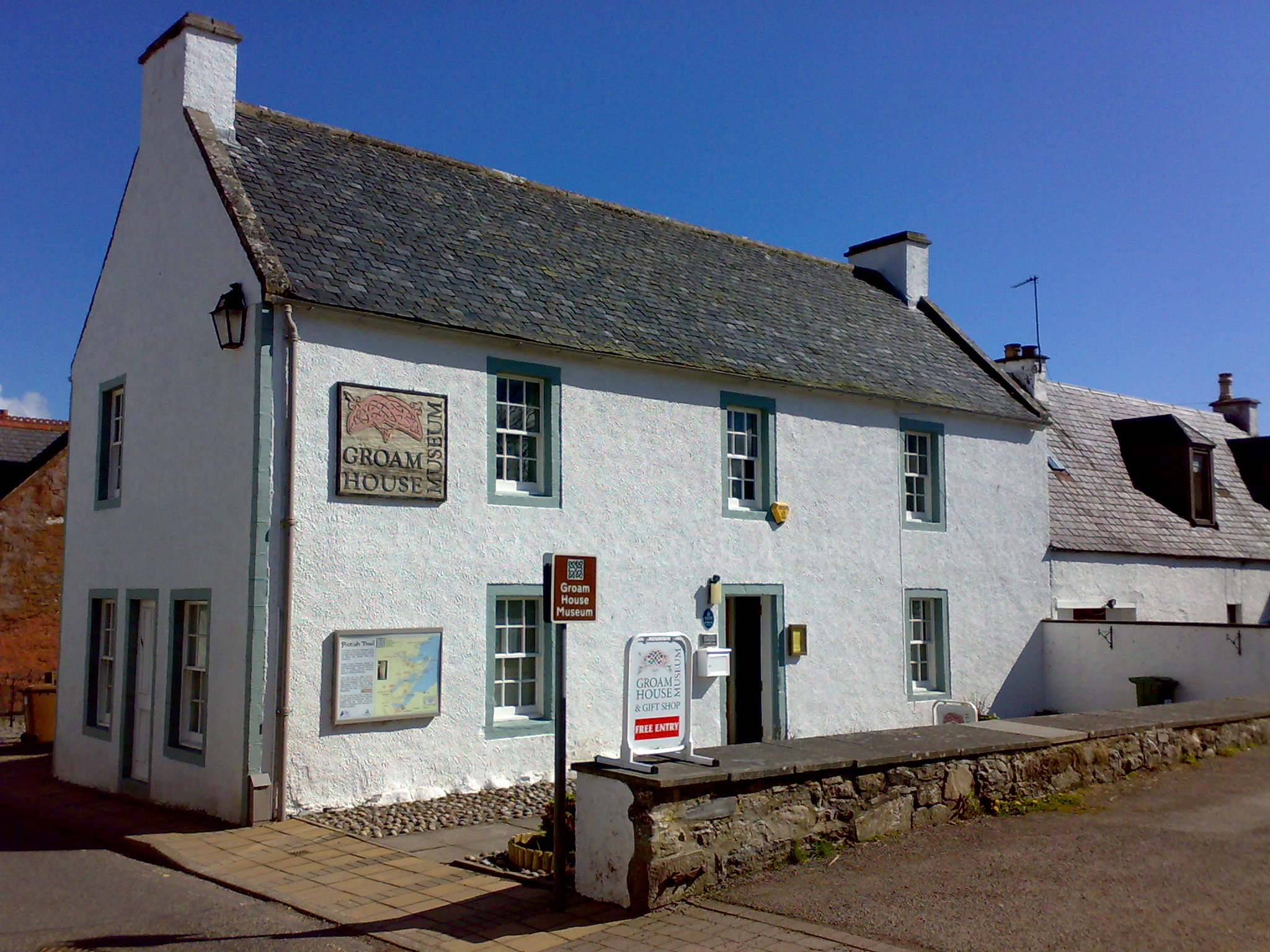
Exterior of Groam House Museum, Rosemarkie

Groam House Museum is a museum of Celtic and Pictish Art. Located in the village of Rosemarkie in the Black Isle, Scotland, its collection contains both the Rosemarkie Stone, one of the major surviving examples of Pictish art in stone, and the Rosemarkie sculpture fragments, that are 14 stone fragments, the most well-known being Daniels Stone. The museum also hosts the George Bain Collection. Bain, who is considered the father of modern Celtic design, spent many years working out the intricate mathematical designs found in Celtic art.

In 2015 the museum organised a Celtic felt banner-making project to create banners for the Celtic Connections Festival 2016.

Artefacts kept by Groam House Museum

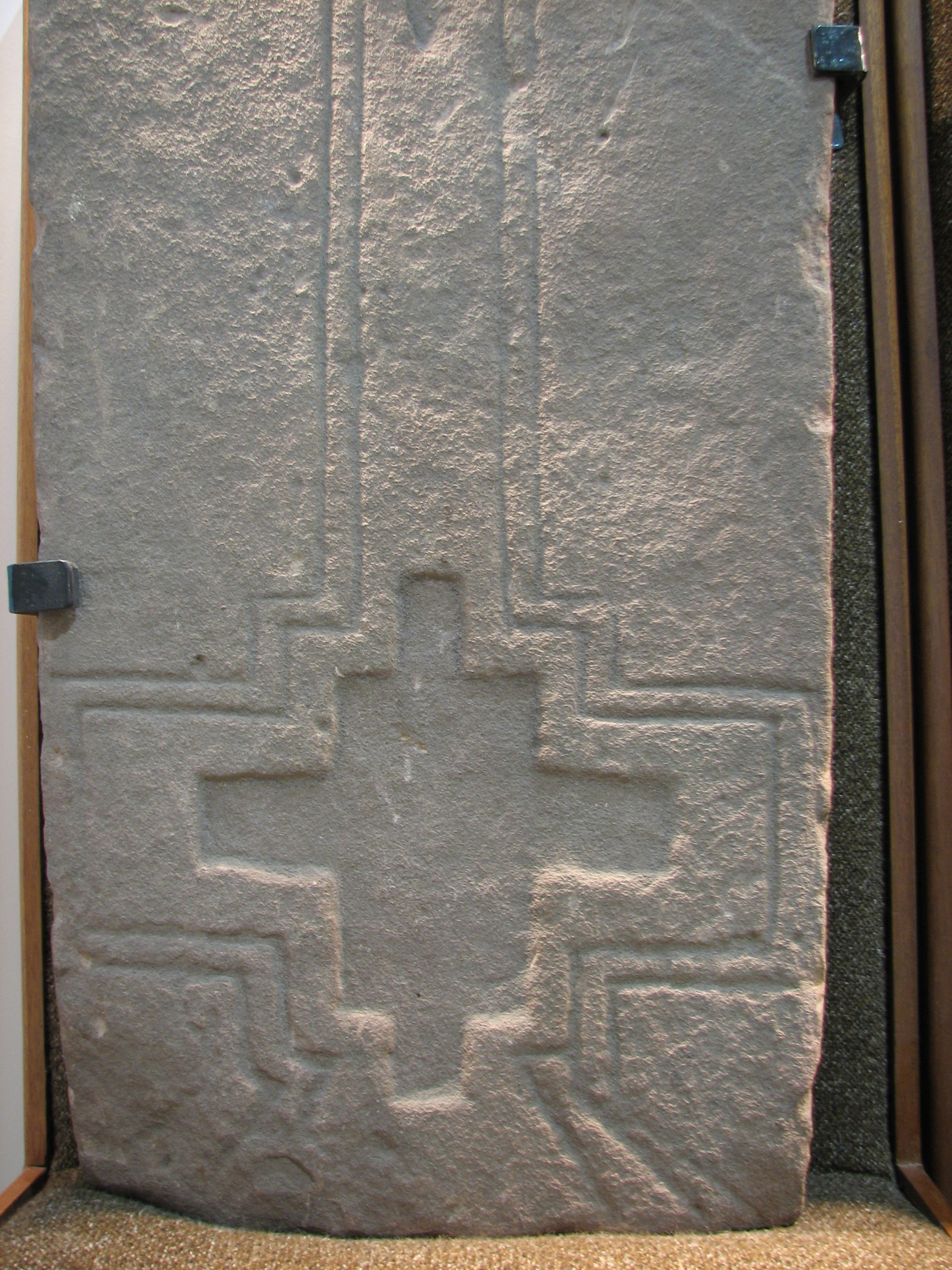
Pictish stone cross

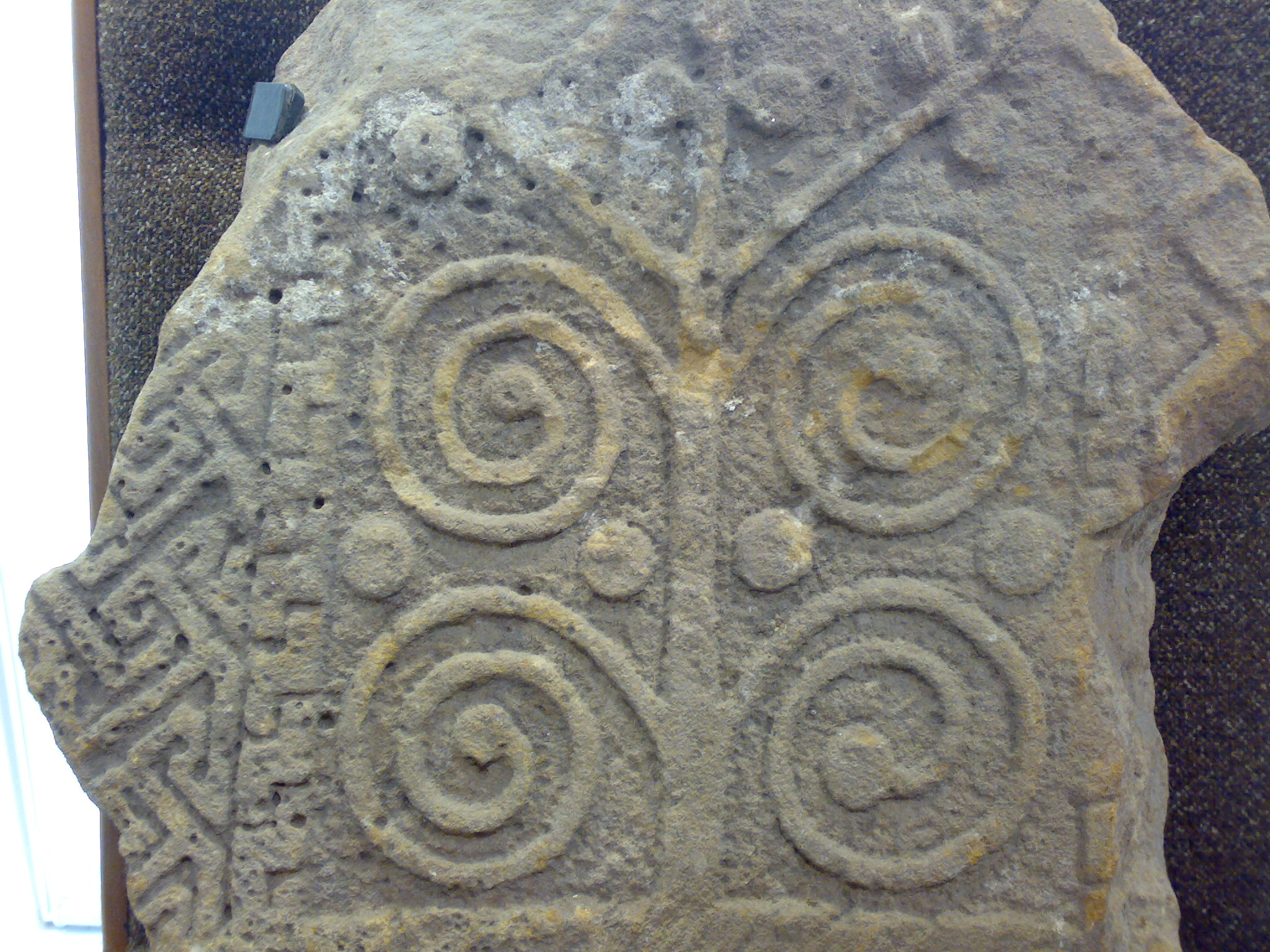
Picktish decorated stone

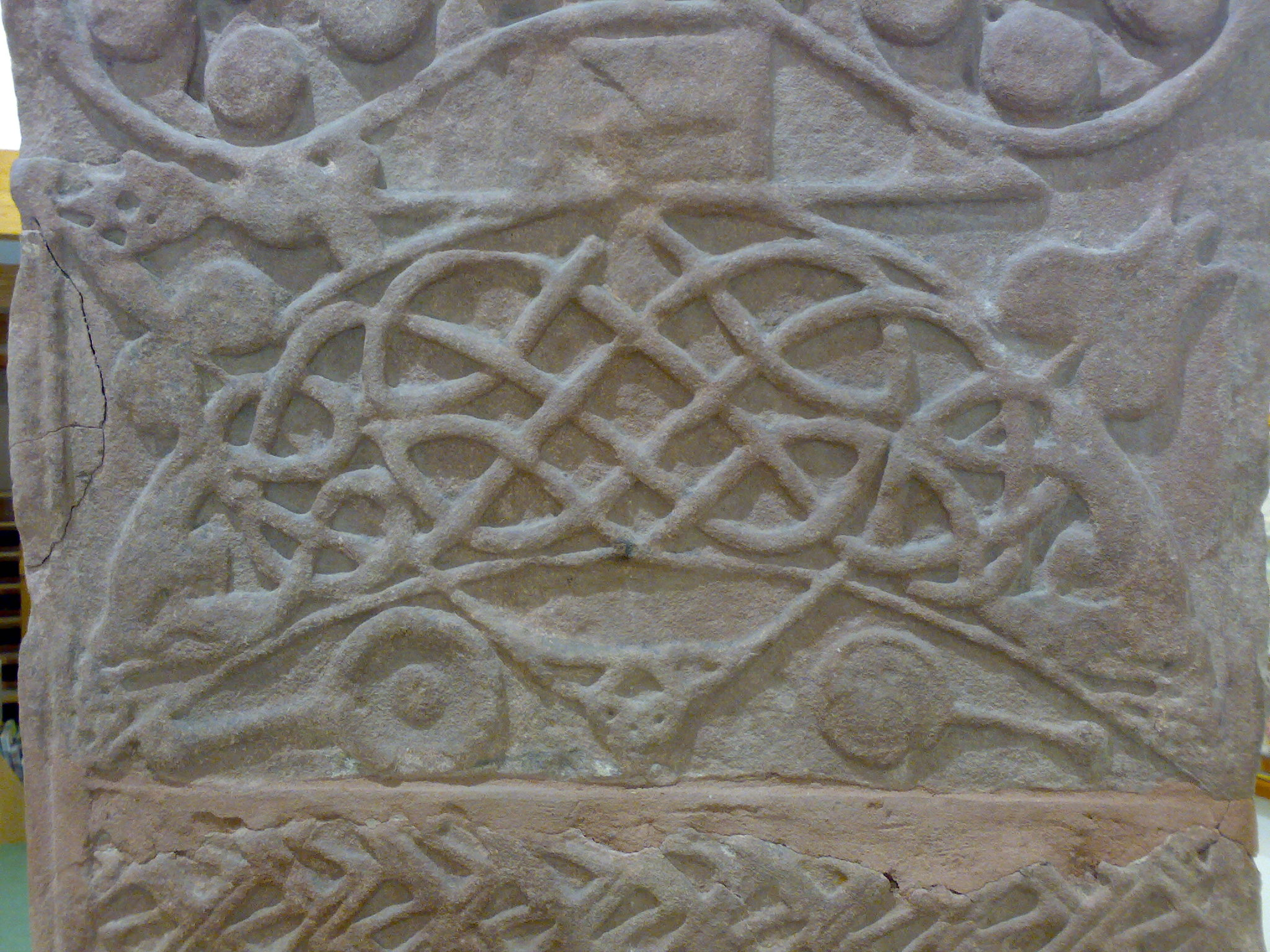
Rosemarkie Stone

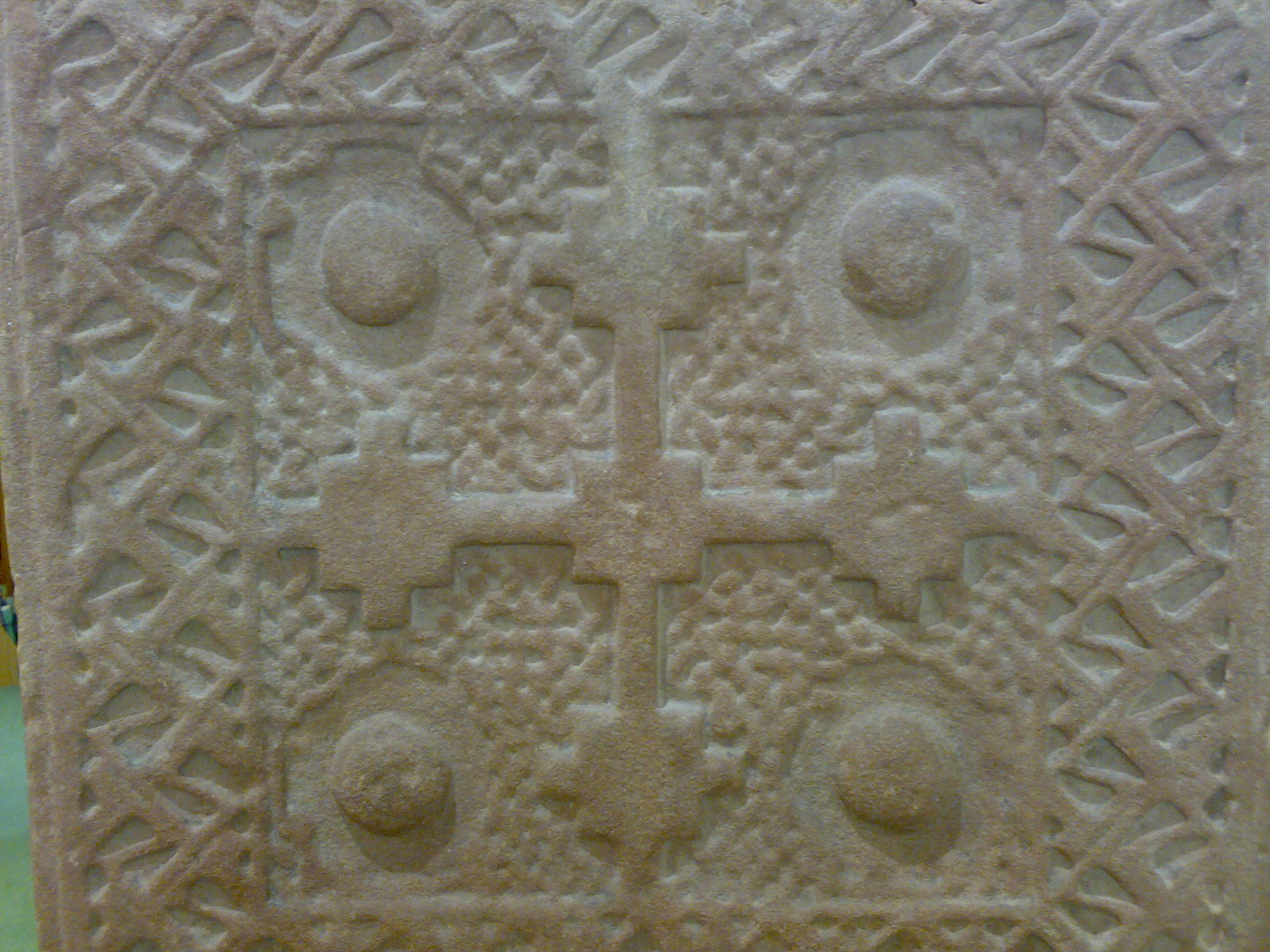
Rosemarkie Stone
