= Ken Bain =

American professor and author

Kenneth Bain (January 29, 1942 – October 10, 2025) was an American professor and author, the President of the Best Teachers Institute, a research and educational organization in New Jersey and Washington, D.C., and he was previously the Provost and Vice President of Academic Affairs at University of the District of Columbia. Having served at these, he also founded several schools, the Center for Teaching Excellence at New York University, Searle Center for Teaching Excellence at Northwestern University, Center for Teaching at Vanderbilt University and also the Research Academy for University Learning at Montclair University. As an author, he is best known for his book What the Best College Teachers Do (Harvard University Press), a best-selling book of higher education, which is currently held in over 2,000 libraries worldwide, including of which Bain himself is held in over 5,000 libraries worldwide, as of 2016.
