= Atu Emberson Bain =

Fijian political leader

Atu Emberson Bain (born 1955 or 1956) is a Fijian political leader. A leading figure in the Fiji Labour Party (FLP), she served from 1999 to 2006 as one of 8 Senators nominated by the Leader of the Opposition.

Bain was educated at the University of Oxford, and Australia National University, graduating from the latter with a PhD.

First appointed to the Senate in 1999 by then-Prime Minister Mahendra Chaudhry, Bain was kidnapped along with many of her colleagues and held as a hostage by gunmen led by George Speight, during the 2000 Fijian coup d'état.

Bain is known for her outspoken opinions. She called for the voting age (then 21) to be lowered, for the national flag bearing the British Union Jack to be changed, and for the portrait of Queen Elizabeth II to be removed from the national currency. In 2005 she said that after 18 years as a republic, Fiji should consider whether it was appropriate to retain the symbols of its colonial past.

Bain had a tense relationship with fellow-Senator Ratu George Cakobau, one of 14 nominees of the Great Council of Chiefs. Parliamentary debates between the two sometimes turned acrimonious, with Cakobau questioning her right to speak on matters pertaining to indigenous Fijians on the grounds that she was not indigenous. (Bain was registered as a General Elector, an omnibus category including Caucasians, Chinese, and other minority groups). He attacked her for commenting on the Vola ni Kawa Bula (VKB, or Native Land Register), saying that only registered members of the VKB had the right to make comments on it. Indigenous landowners, however, defended her, saying that she was taking up their cause at their own request. In late 2005, a Senatorial committee investigated a complaint from Bain that Cakobau insulted her.

Bain was not reappointed to the Senate in 2006, and differences between her and the FLP leadership subsequently became public when she joined fellow-FLP politicians Krishna Datt, Felix Anthony, Agni Deo Singh, and Poseci Bune in criticizing Mahendra's leadership style.

Following the 2006 Fijian coup d'état she trained as a lawyer at the University of the South Pacific, and was admitted to the bar in 2011.
