= William Bain =

Bill Bain or William Bain may refer to:

- Bill Bain (consultant) (1937–2018), American management consultant, founder of Bain & Company
- Bill Bain (American football) (born 1952), American football player
- Bill Bain (director) (1929–1982), Australian-born television director
- William Bain (lecturer), academic
- William Bain (Royal Navy officer) (1771–1853), Scottish Royal Navy officer, inventor, and steamship captain
- William Alexander Bain (1905–1971), Scottish pharmacologist
- William J. Bain (1896–1985), Seattle architect, co-founder of NBBJ
- Willie Bain (born 1972), Scottish politician

== See also ==
- William Bayne (disambiguation)
