= Donald Bain =

Donald Bain may refer to:

- Donald III of Scotland (c. 1033–1099), king of Scotland
- Donald Bain (writer) (1935–2017), United States author and ghostwriter
- Donald Bain, first husband of the Scottish Nationalist politician Margaret Ewing
- Dan Bain (Donald Henderson Bain, 1874–1962), Canadian athlete and merchant
- SS Donald W. Bain, a Liberty ship
