= Bayne, Washington =

Ghost town in Washington (state)

- Ghost town
- Location within Washington (state) Location within the United States
- Coordinates: 47°14′42″N 121°54′34″W
- Country: United States
- State: Washington
- County: King
- Elevation: 879 ft (268 m)
- Time zone: UTC-8 (Pacific (PST))
  - Summer (DST): UTC-7 (PDT)
- ZIP codes: 98022
- GNIS feature ID: 1516203

Bayne was an unincorporated community in King County, Washington. It was a coal mining town that was abandoned in the years after the mine closed around 1950.
