= Rosemarkie =

Village in Scotland

Coordinates: 57.59162°N 4.11516°W

Rosemarkie: Scottish Gaelic: Ros Mhaircnidh; Scots: Rossmartnie
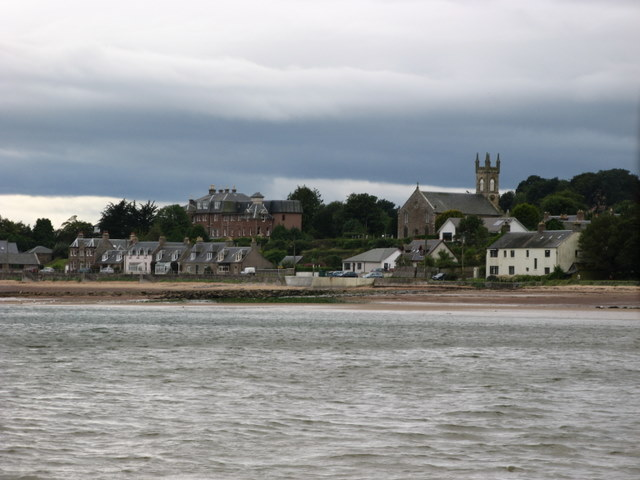
- Rosemarkie seen from the beach

- Location within the Ross and Cromarty area
- Population: 640 (2020)
- OS grid reference: NH736577
- Council area: Highland
- Country: Scotland
- Sovereign state: United Kingdom
- Post town: Fortrose
- Postcode district: IV10 8
- Police: Scotland
- Fire: Scottish
- Ambulance: Scottish

Rosemarkie (Scots: Rossmartnie, from Scottish Gaelic: Ros Mhaircnidh meaning "promontory of the horse stream") is a village on the south coast of the Black Isle peninsula in Ross-shire (Ross and Cromarty), northern Scotland.

== Geography ==
Rosemarkie lies a quarter of a mile east of the town of Fortrose. The pair make up the Royal Burgh Of Fortrose and Rosemarkie, situated either side of the Chanonry Ness promontory, about 12 miles (19 km) north-east of Inverness. Close to the village the Markie Burn has its mouth in the Moray Firth. The stream runs into the Fairy Glen, a small and steep-sided valley established as a RSPB nature reserve.

Rosemarkie fronts on a wide bay, with views of Fort George and the Moray coastline across the Moray Firth. At the southern end of the beach is Chanonry Point, a dolphin sighting area.

The village is linked to Inverness by broadly hourly bus services, which are provided by Stagecoach Group.

== Pictish stones ==
Rosemarkie is probably best known for its collection of finely carved Pictish stones, which is one of the largest in Scotland at a single site. These 8th-9th-century sculptures, found in and around the town's churchyard, are displayed in the Groam House Museum, a converted 18th-century town-house on the High Street. The house is open in summer and charges a small entrance fee. These carved stones are evidence for a major early monastery at Rosemarkie, founded by, or associated with, Saint Moluag (d. 592) and Boniface, otherwise known as Curetán (fl. early 8th century). The sculptures include cross-slabs, shrine fragments and architectural pieces. One small fragment of a stone from Rosemarkie is in the Museum of Scotland in Edinburgh.

== Notable people ==
- Vince Jack (1933–2006), footballer

== See also ==
- Curetán
- Bishop of Ross (Scotland)
- Rosemarkie sculpture fragments
- Rosemarkie transmitting station
