= Canton of Châtenois =

Coordinates: 48°18′11″N 5°49′31″E

Châtenois
- Former canton
- Interactive map of Châtenois
- Country: France
- Region: Grand Est
- Department: Vosges
- No. of communes: {{{nbcomm}}}
- Disbanded: 2015
- Area: 189.17 km^{2} (73.04 sq mi)
- Population (2012): 6,828
  - Density: 36.09/km^{2} (93.48/sq mi)

The Canton of Châtenois is a French former administrative grouping of communes in the Vosges département of eastern France and in the region of Lorraine. It was disbanded following the French canton reorganisation which came into effect in March 2015. It had 6,828 inhabitants (2012).

It had its administrative centre at Châtenois.

== Composition ==
The Canton of Châtenois comprised the following 25 communes:

- Aouze
- Aroffe
- Balléville
- Châtenois
- Courcelles-sous-Châtenois
- Darney-aux-Chênes
- Dolaincourt
- Dommartin-sur-Vraine
- Gironcourt-sur-Vraine
- Houécourt
- La Neuveville-sous-Châtenois
- Longchamp-sous-Châtenois
- Maconcourt
- Morelmaison
- Ollainville
- Pleuvezain
- Rainville
- Removille
- Rouvres-la-Chétive
- Saint-Paul
- Sandaucourt
- Soncourt
- Vicherey
- Viocourt
- Vouxey
