= Communauté de communes du Pays de Châtenois =

The Communauté de communes du Pays de Châtenois is a former administrative association of communes in the Vosges département of eastern France and in the region of Lorraine. It was merged into the new Communauté de communes de l'Ouest Vosgien in January 2017.

Created in 1994, the association had its administrative offices at Châtenois.

== Member communes ==
The Communauté de communes comprised the following communes:

- Aouze
- Balléville
- Châtenois
- Darney-aux-Chênes
- Dolaincourt
- Dommartin-sur-Vraine
- Gironcourt-sur-Vraine
- Longchamp-sous-Châtenois
- Morelmaison
- La Neuveville-sous-Châtenois
- Ollainville
- Rainville
- Removille
- Saint-Paul
- Viocourt
- Vouxey
