= Association of Xaintois communes =

Former French administrative association

The Association of the Xaintois communes (French: Communauté de communes du Xaintois) is a former administrative association of rural communes in the Vosges département of eastern France and in the region of Lorraine. It was created in December 1998. It was merged into the Communauté de communes du Pays de Mirecourt in January 2014, which was merged into the new Communauté de communes de Mirecourt Dompaire in January 2017.

The association had its administrative offices at Oëlleville.

== Composition ==
The Communauté de communes comprised the following communes:

- Biécourt
- Blémerey
- Boulaincourt
- Chef-Haut
- Frenelle-la-Grande
- Frenelle-la-Petite
- Oëlleville
- Repel
- Saint-Prancher
- Totainville
