= Balléville =

- Commune
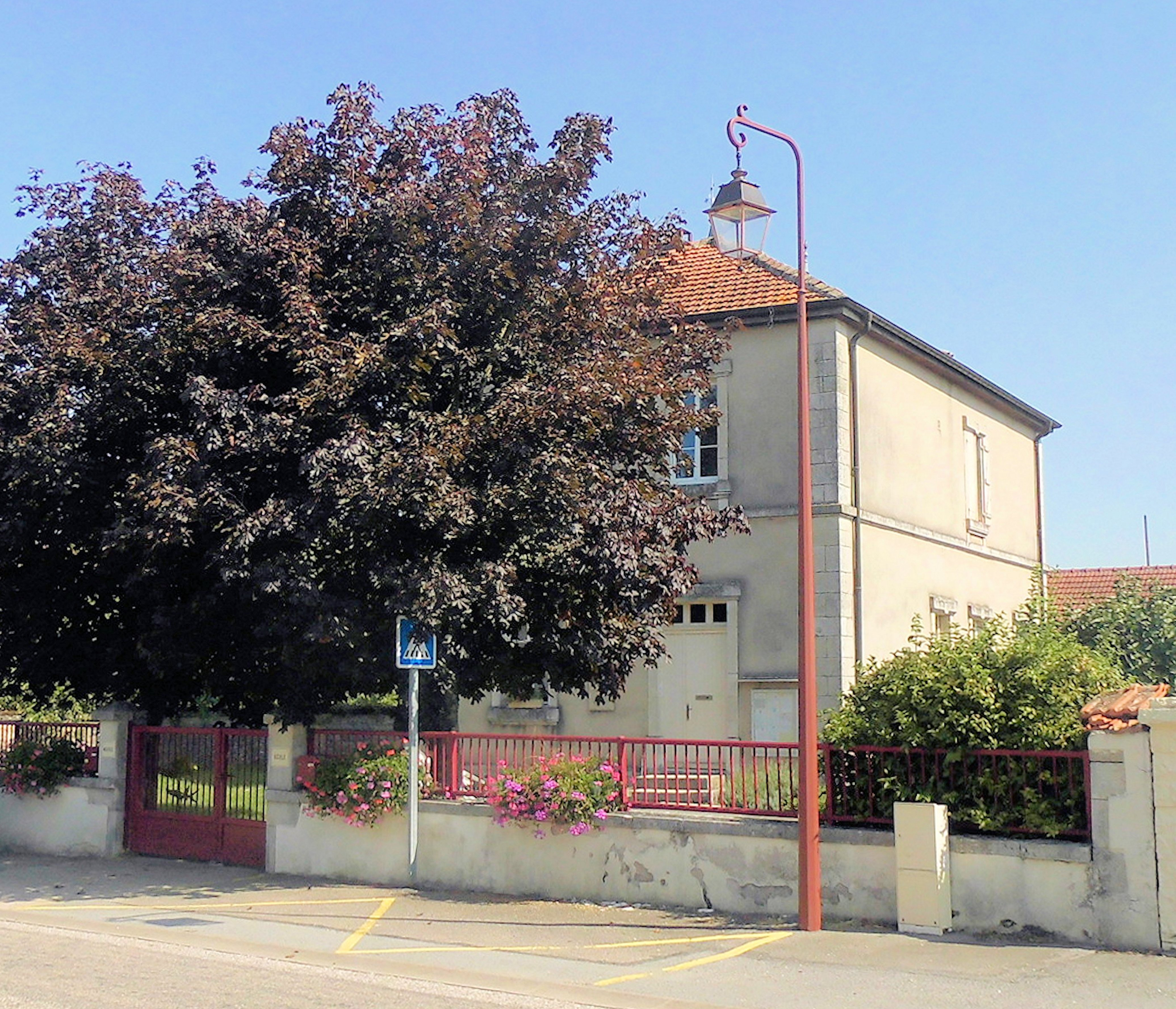
- The town hall and school in Balléville
- Location of Balléville
- Location within France Location within Grand Est
- Coordinates: 48°19′52″N 5°50′58″E
- Country: France
- Region: Grand Est
- Department: Vosges
- Arrondissement: Neufchâteau
- Canton: Mirecourt
- Intercommunality: CC l'Ouest Vosgien

Government
  - Mayor (2023–2026): Pierre Passetemps-Philbert
- Area^{1}: 6.25 km^{2} (2.41 sq mi)
- Elevation: 314 m (1,030 ft)
- Highest elevation: 427 m (1,401 ft)
- Lowest elevation: 300 m (980 ft)
- Population (2023): 97
  - Density: 16/km^{2} (40/sq mi)
- Time zone: UTC+01:00 (CET)
  - Summer (DST): UTC+02:00 (CEST)
- INSEE/Postal code: 88031 /88170
- ^{1} French Land Register data, which excludes lakes, ponds, glaciers > 1 km^{2} (0.386 sq mi or 247 acres) and river estuaries.

Balléville (French pronunciation: [balevil]) is a commune in the Vosges department in Grand Est in northeastern France.

== Geography ==
Balléville is located about 10 km (6 mi) east of Neufchâteau and 20 km (12 mi) west of Mirecourt, on the left bank of the Vair river. The Vraine forms part of the commune's northeastern boundary.

The neighbouring communes are Removille and Rainville to the northeast, Saint-Paul and Viocourt to the east, Châtenois to the south, Courcelles-sous-Châtenois to the west, and Dolaincourt and Vouxey to the northwest. The A31 autoroute crosses the eastern part of the commune.

== Demographics ==
Population
| Year | 1962 | 1968 | 1975 | 1982 | 1990 | 1999 | 2009 | 2012 |
|---|---|---|---|---|---|---|---|---|
| Population | 91 | 93 | 99 | 80 | 94 | 101 | 109 | 98 |

Source: INSEE

== Sights ==
- Croix de Solana, a 16th-century cemetery cross, listed as a monument historique.
- Croix de Chemin, a 16th-century wayside cross, listed as a monument historique.
- The Nativité-de-Notre-Dame Church (Church of the Nativity of Mary).

== See also ==
- Communes of the Vosges department
