= Ollainville =

Ollainville is the name of two communes in France:

- Ollainville, Vosges
- Ollainville, Essonne
