= Villers, Vosges =

Villers
- Commune
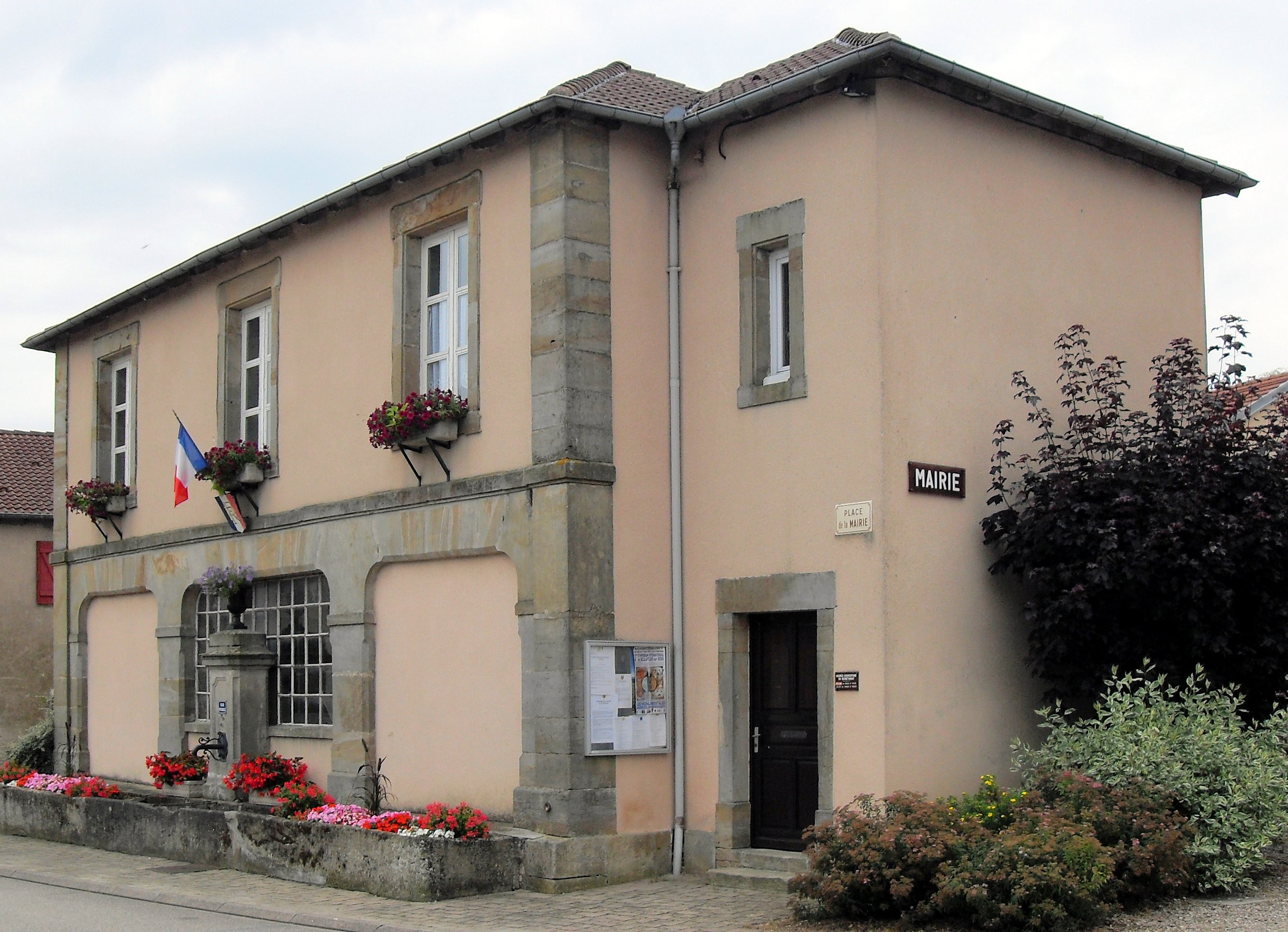
- The town hall in Villers
- Location of Villers
- Location within France Location within Grand Est
- Coordinates: 48°18′09″N 6°10′26″E
- Country: France
- Region: Grand Est
- Department: Vosges
- Arrondissement: Neufchâteau
- Canton: Mirecourt
- Intercommunality: CC Mirecourt Dompaire

Government
  - Mayor (2020–2026): Marilyna Vantini
- Area^{1}: 4.97 km^{2} (1.92 sq mi)
- Elevation: 300 m (980 ft)
- Highest elevation: 386 m (1,266 ft)
- Lowest elevation: 280 m (920 ft)
- Population (2023): 188
  - Density: 37.8/km^{2} (98.0/sq mi)
- Time zone: UTC+01:00 (CET)
  - Summer (DST): UTC+02:00 (CEST)
- INSEE/Postal code: 88507 /88500
- ^{1} French Land Register data, which excludes lakes, ponds, glaciers > 1 km^{2} (0.386 sq mi or 247 acres) and river estuaries.

Villers is a commune in the Vosges department in Grand Est in northeastern France.

== See also ==
- Communes of the Vosges department
