= Canton of Mirecourt =

Coordinates: 48°18′0″N 6°8′3″E

Mirecourt
- Canton
- Country: France
- Region: Grand Est
- Department: Vosges
- No. of communes: {{{nbcomm}}}
- Area: 349.61 km^{2} (134.99 sq mi)
- Population (2023): 16,510
  - Density: 47.22/km^{2} (122.3/sq mi)
- INSEE code: 88 09

The Canton of Mirecourt is a French administrative grouping of communes in the Vosges département of eastern France and in the region of Grand Est.

== Composition ==
At the French canton reorganisation which came into effect in March 2015, the canton was expanded from 32 to 56 communes:

- Ambacourt
- Aouze
- Aroffe
- Balléville
- Baudricourt
- Biécourt
- Blémerey
- Boulaincourt
- Châtenois
- Chauffecourt
- Chef-Haut
- Courcelles-sous-Châtenois
- Darney-aux-Chênes
- Dolaincourt
- Dombasle-en-Xaintois
- Dommartin-sur-Vraine
- Domvallier
- Frenelle-la-Grande
- Frenelle-la-Petite
- Gironcourt-sur-Vraine
- Houécourt
- Hymont
- Juvaincourt
- Longchamp-sous-Châtenois
- Maconcourt
- Madecourt
- Mattaincourt
- Mazirot
- Ménil-en-Xaintois
- Mirecourt
- Morelmaison
- La Neuveville-sous-Châtenois
- Oëlleville
- Ollainville
- Pleuvezain
- Poussay
- Puzieux
- Rainville
- Ramecourt
- Remicourt
- Removille
- Repel
- Rouvres-en-Xaintois
- Saint-Menge
- Saint-Paul
- Saint-Prancher
- Sandaucourt
- Soncourt
- Thiraucourt
- Totainville
- Valleroy-aux-Saules
- Vicherey
- Villers
- Viocourt
- Vouxey
- Vroville
