= Remicourt =

Remicourt is the name of several places:

== Belgium ==
- Remicourt, Belgium, a municipality in the province of Liège, Wallonia

== France ==
Remicourt is the name of several communes in France:

- Remicourt, Marne, in the Marne département
- Remicourt, Vosges, in the Vosges département
