= Frenelle-la-Grande =

- Commune
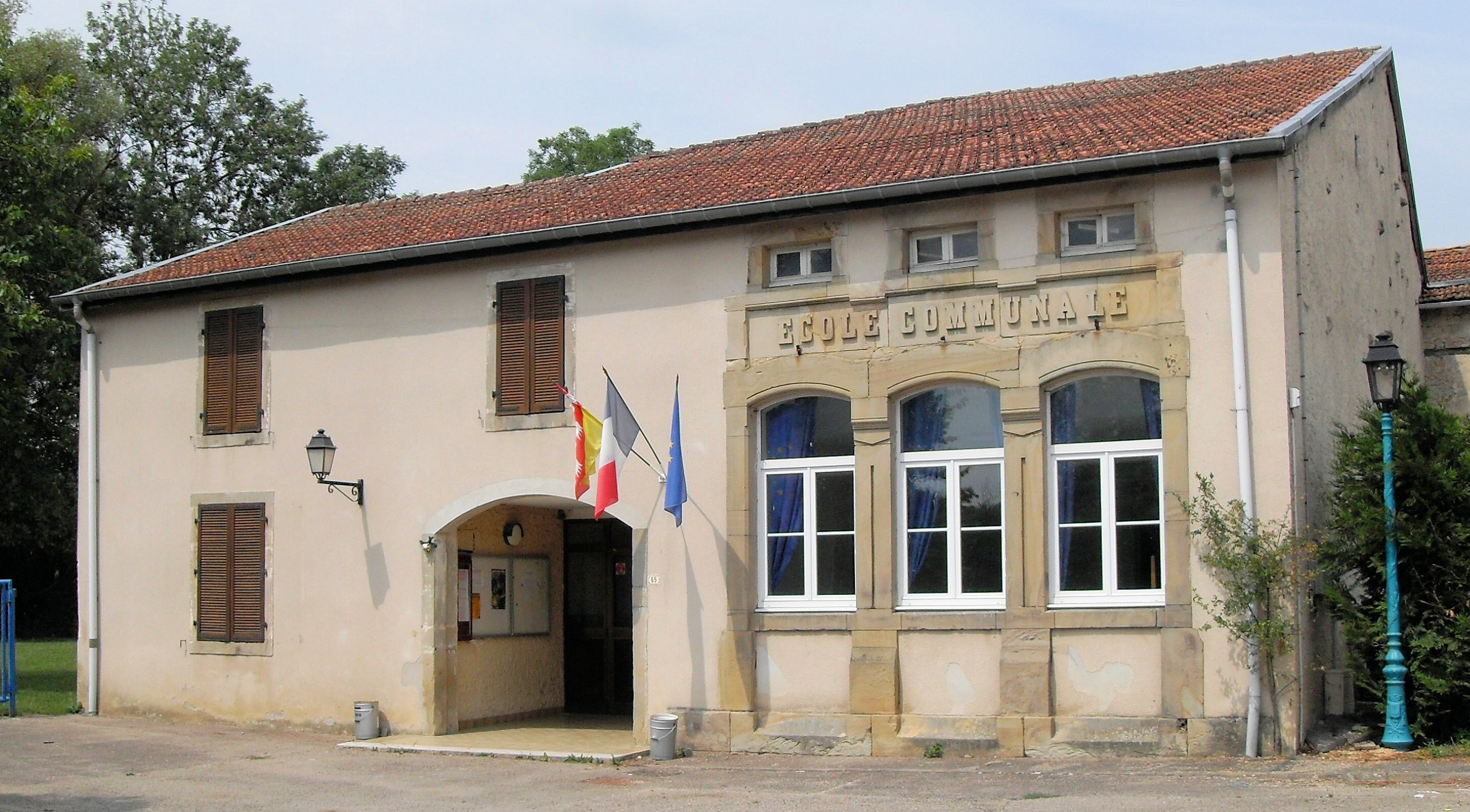
- The town hall in Frenelle-la-Grande

- Coat of arms
- Location of Frenelle-la-Grande
- Location within France Location within Grand Est
- Coordinates: 48°21′24″N 6°05′08″E
- Country: France
- Region: Grand Est
- Department: Vosges
- Arrondissement: Neufchâteau
- Canton: Mirecourt
- Intercommunality: CC Mirecourt Dompaire

Government
  - Mayor (2020–2026): Christian Denis
- Area^{1}: 5.5 km^{2} (2.1 sq mi)
- Elevation: 288 m (945 ft)
- Highest elevation: 321 m (1,053 ft)
- Lowest elevation: 282 m (925 ft)
- Population (2023): 97
  - Density: 18/km^{2} (46/sq mi)
- Time zone: UTC+01:00 (CET)
  - Summer (DST): UTC+02:00 (CEST)
- INSEE/Postal code: 88185 /88500
- ^{1} French Land Register data, which excludes lakes, ponds, glaciers > 1 km^{2} (0.386 sq mi or 247 acres) and river estuaries.

Frenelle-la-Grande (French pronunciation: [fʁənɛl la ɡʁɑ̃d]) is a commune in the Vosges department in Grand Est in northeastern France.

== Geography ==
Frenelle-la-Grande is adjacent to the department of Meurthe-et-Moselle, at 7 km northwest of Mirecourt. Frenelle-la-Petite is a neighbor to the west.

== See also ==
- Communes of the Vosges department
