= Domvallier =

- Commune
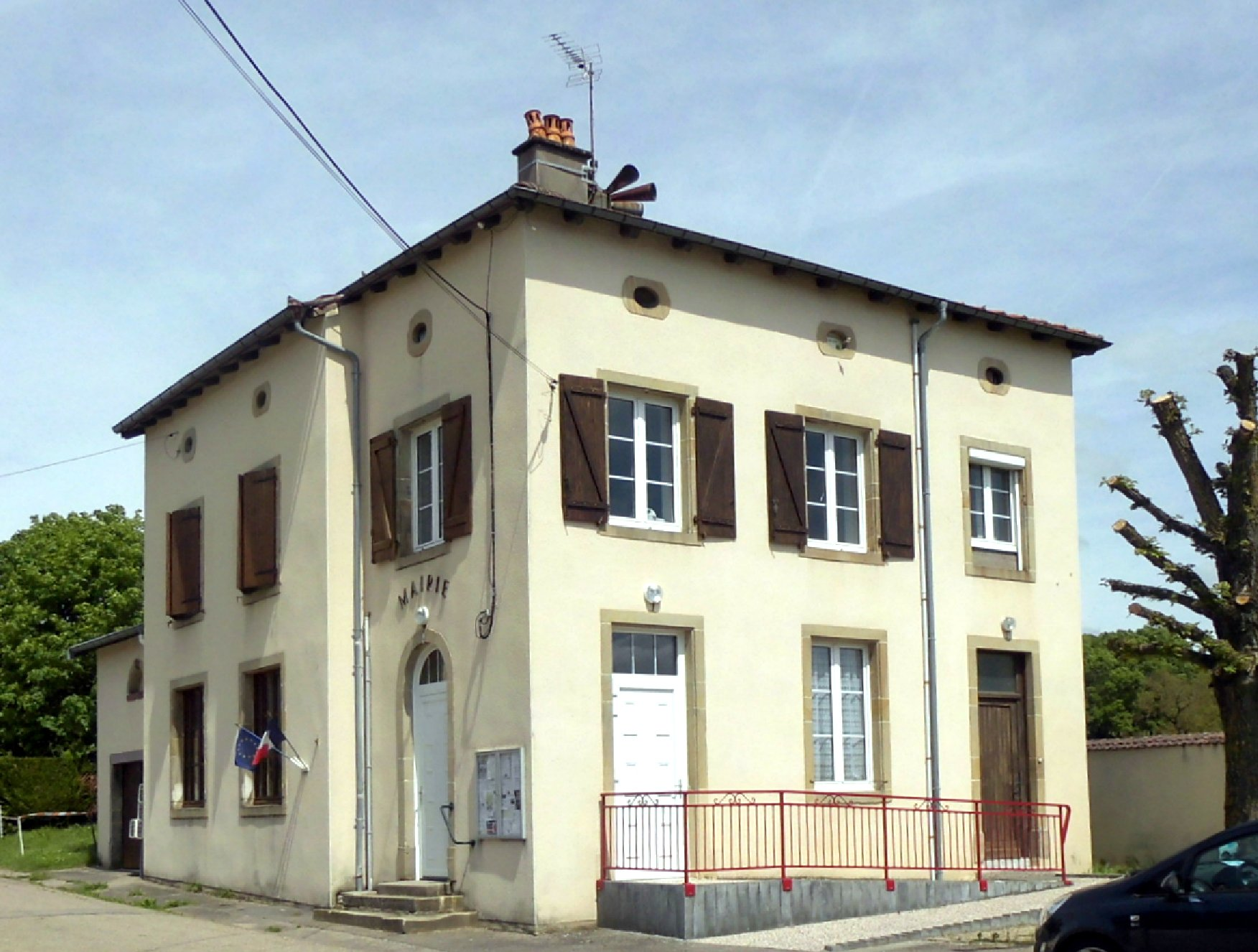
- The town hall in Domvallier
- Location of Domvallier
- Location within France Location within Grand Est
- Coordinates: 48°18′34″N 6°05′03″E
- Country: France
- Region: Grand Est
- Department: Vosges
- Arrondissement: Neufchâteau
- Canton: Mirecourt
- Intercommunality: CC Mirecourt Dompaire

Government
  - Mayor (2020–2026): Serge Valance
- Area^{1}: 3.24 km^{2} (1.25 sq mi)
- Elevation: 288 m (945 ft)
- Highest elevation: 377 m (1,237 ft)
- Lowest elevation: 281 m (922 ft)
- Population (2023): 93
  - Density: 29/km^{2} (74/sq mi)
- Time zone: UTC+01:00 (CET)
  - Summer (DST): UTC+02:00 (CEST)
- INSEE/Postal code: 88155 /88500
- ^{1} French Land Register data, which excludes lakes, ponds, glaciers > 1 km^{2} (0.386 sq mi or 247 acres) and river estuaries.

Domvallier (French pronunciation: [dɔ̃valje]) is a commune in the Vosges department in Grand Est in northeastern France.

== See also ==
- Communes of the Vosges department
