= Juvaincourt =

- Commune
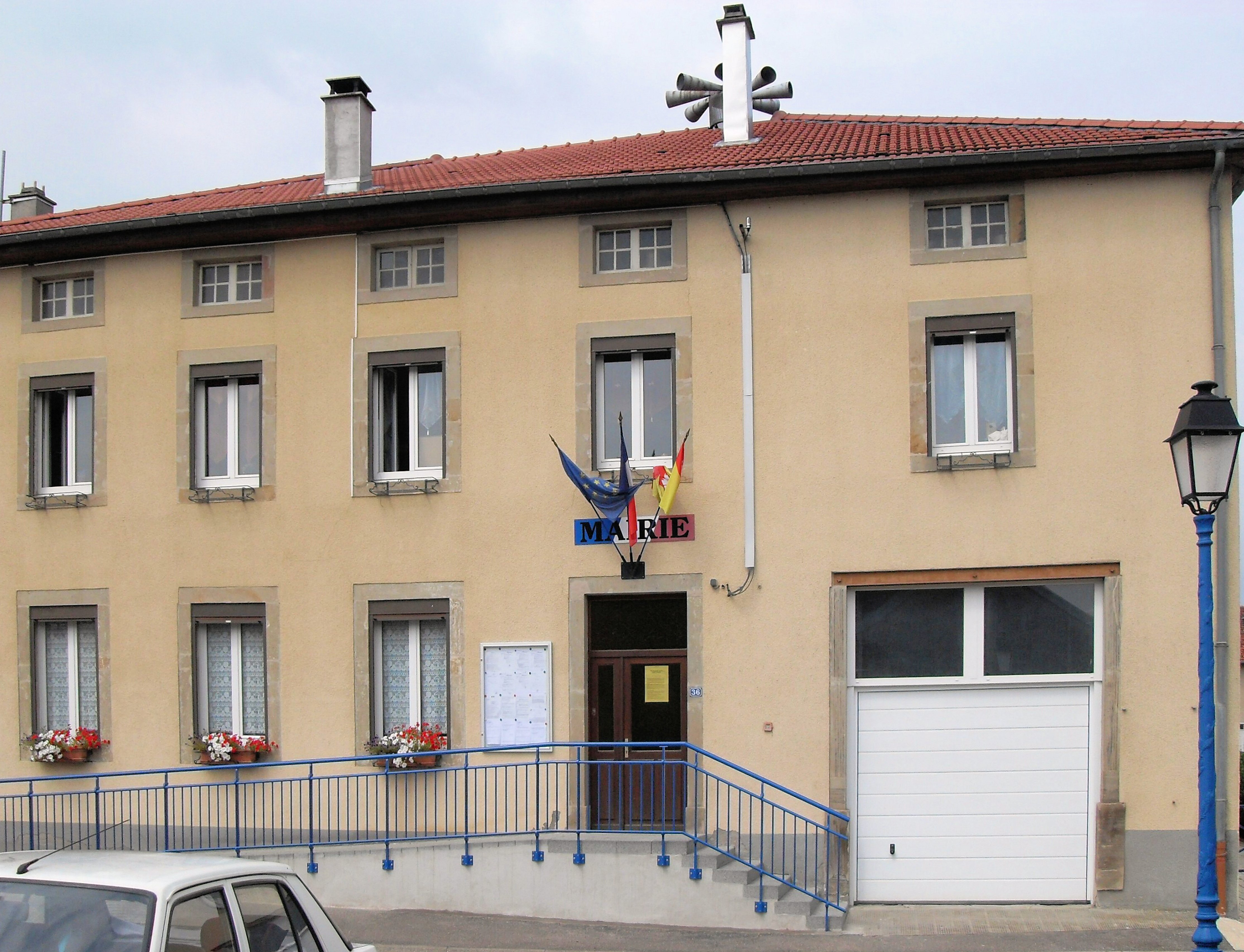
- The town hall in Juvaincourt
- Location of Juvaincourt
- Location within France Location within Grand Est
- Coordinates: 48°19′55″N 6°03′32″E
- Country: France
- Region: Grand Est
- Department: Vosges
- Arrondissement: Neufchâteau
- Canton: Mirecourt
- Intercommunality: CC Mirecourt Dompaire

Government
  - Mayor (2024–2026): Anne Jacopin
- Area^{1}: 8.82 km^{2} (3.41 sq mi)
- Elevation: 305 m (1,001 ft)
- Highest elevation: 348 m (1,142 ft)
- Lowest elevation: 293 m (961 ft)
- Population (2023): 184
  - Density: 20.9/km^{2} (54.0/sq mi)
- Time zone: UTC+01:00 (CET)
  - Summer (DST): UTC+02:00 (CEST)
- INSEE/Postal code: 88257 /88500
- ^{1} French Land Register data, which excludes lakes, ponds, glaciers > 1 km^{2} (0.386 sq mi or 247 acres) and river estuaries.

Juvaincourt (French pronunciation: [ʒyvɛ̃kuʁ]) is a commune in the Vosges department in Grand Est in northeastern France.

== See also ==
- Communes of the Vosges department
