= Biécourt =

- Commune
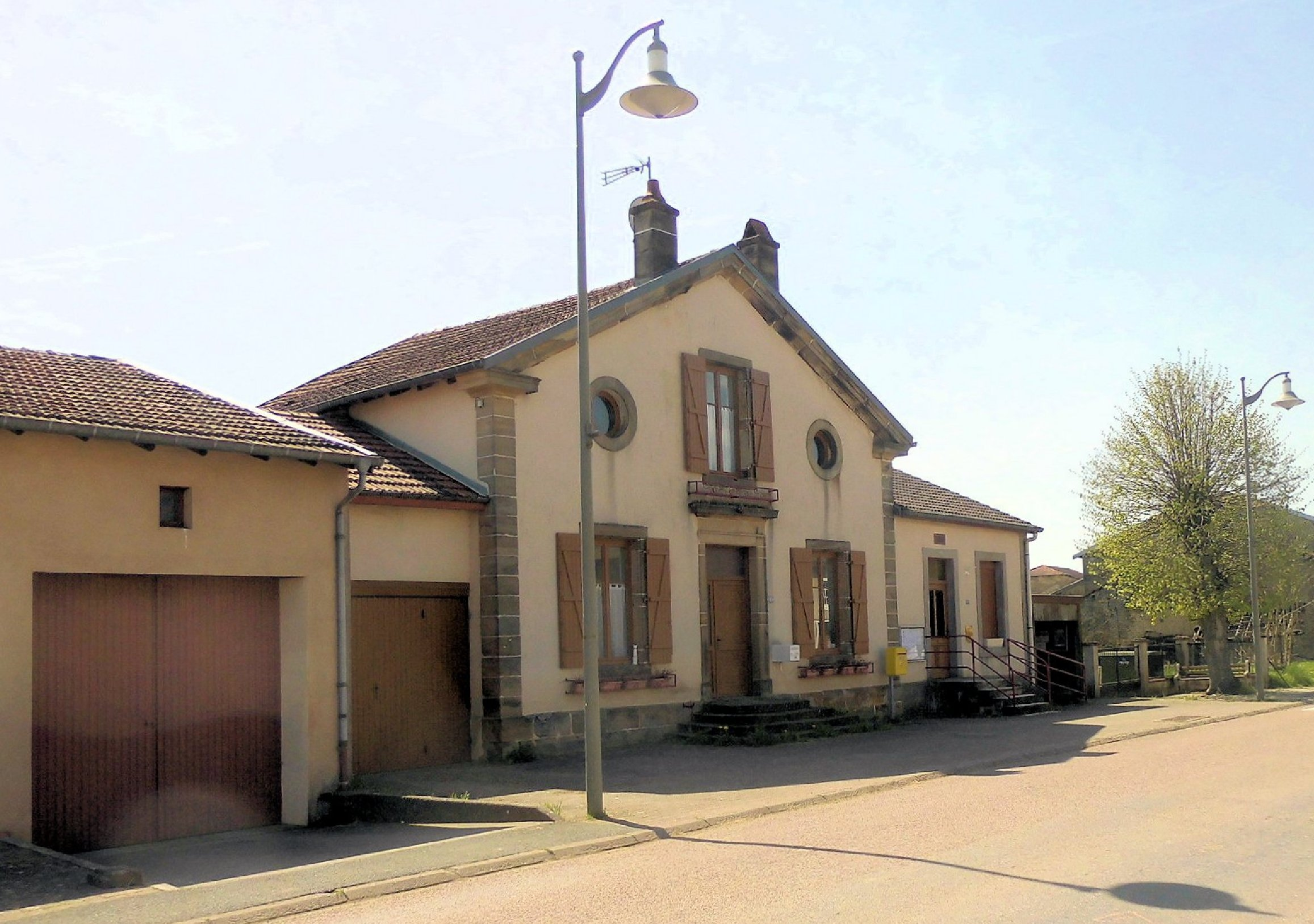
- The town hall in Biécourt
- Location of Biécourt
- Location within France Location within Grand Est
- Coordinates: 48°19′23″N 5°57′16″E
- Country: France
- Region: Grand Est
- Department: Vosges
- Arrondissement: Neufchâteau
- Canton: Mirecourt
- Intercommunality: CC Mirecourt Dompaire

Government
  - Mayor (2020–2026): Roland Tocquard
- Area^{1}: 5.94 km^{2} (2.29 sq mi)
- Elevation: 325 m (1,066 ft)
- Highest elevation: 349 m (1,145 ft)
- Lowest elevation: 311 m (1,020 ft)
- Population (2023): 89
  - Density: 15/km^{2} (39/sq mi)
- Time zone: UTC+01:00 (CET)
  - Summer (DST): UTC+02:00 (CEST)
- INSEE/Postal code: 88058 /88170
- ^{1} French Land Register data, which excludes lakes, ponds, glaciers > 1 km^{2} (0.386 sq mi or 247 acres) and river estuaries.

Biécourt (French pronunciation: [bjekuʁ]) is a commune in the Vosges department in Grand Est in northeastern France.

== See also ==
- Communes of the Vosges department
