= Oëlleville =

- Commune
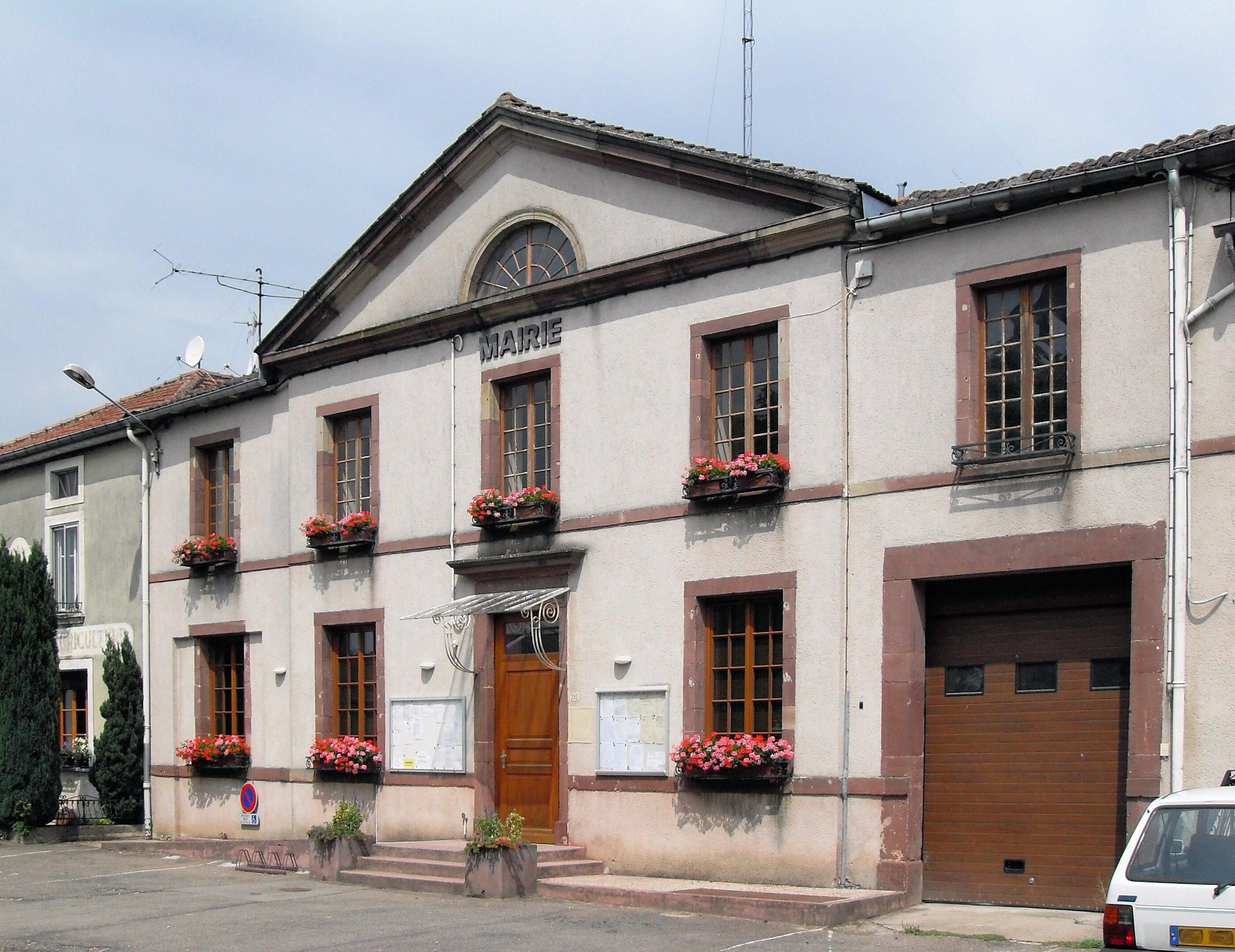
- The town hall in Oëlleville

- Coat of arms
- Location of Oëlleville
- Location within France Location within Grand Est
- Coordinates: 48°20′07″N 6°01′15″E
- Country: France
- Region: Grand Est
- Department: Vosges
- Arrondissement: Neufchâteau
- Canton: Mirecourt
- Intercommunality: CC Mirecourt Dompaire

Government
  - Mayor (2020–2026): Yveline Herbelot
- Area^{1}: 10.08 km^{2} (3.89 sq mi)
- Elevation: 364 m (1,194 ft)
- Highest elevation: 391 m (1,283 ft)
- Lowest elevation: 308 m (1,010 ft)
- Population (2023): 266
  - Density: 26.4/km^{2} (68.3/sq mi)
- Time zone: UTC+01:00 (CET)
  - Summer (DST): UTC+02:00 (CEST)
- INSEE/Postal code: 88334 /88500
- ^{1} French Land Register data, which excludes lakes, ponds, glaciers > 1 km^{2} (0.386 sq mi or 247 acres) and river estuaries.

Oëlleville (French pronunciation: [ɔɛlvil]) is a commune in the Vosges department in Grand Est in northeastern France.

Inhabitants are called Oëllevillois.

== Geography ==
The commune is positioned at the confluence of various minor roads approximately 10 kilometres (6 mi) to the west-north-west of Mirecourt and a slightly longer distance to the north-north-east of Vittel. Over 12% of the commune land is forested.

== Tradition ==
The village makes a particular feature of the feast of St Nicholas on December 6. Each year a member of the community, chosen for his imposing physique and the steely firmness of his eyes, is selected to dress up as The Saint, who is accompanied by Père Fouettard (better known to some English speakers as Hans Trapp in Alsace or Zwarte Piet in Flanders) with his own bag of less welcome seasonal gifts. A procession and other seasonal gift related celebrations and rituals ensue.

== See also ==
- Communes of the Vosges department
