= Chef-Haut =

- Commune
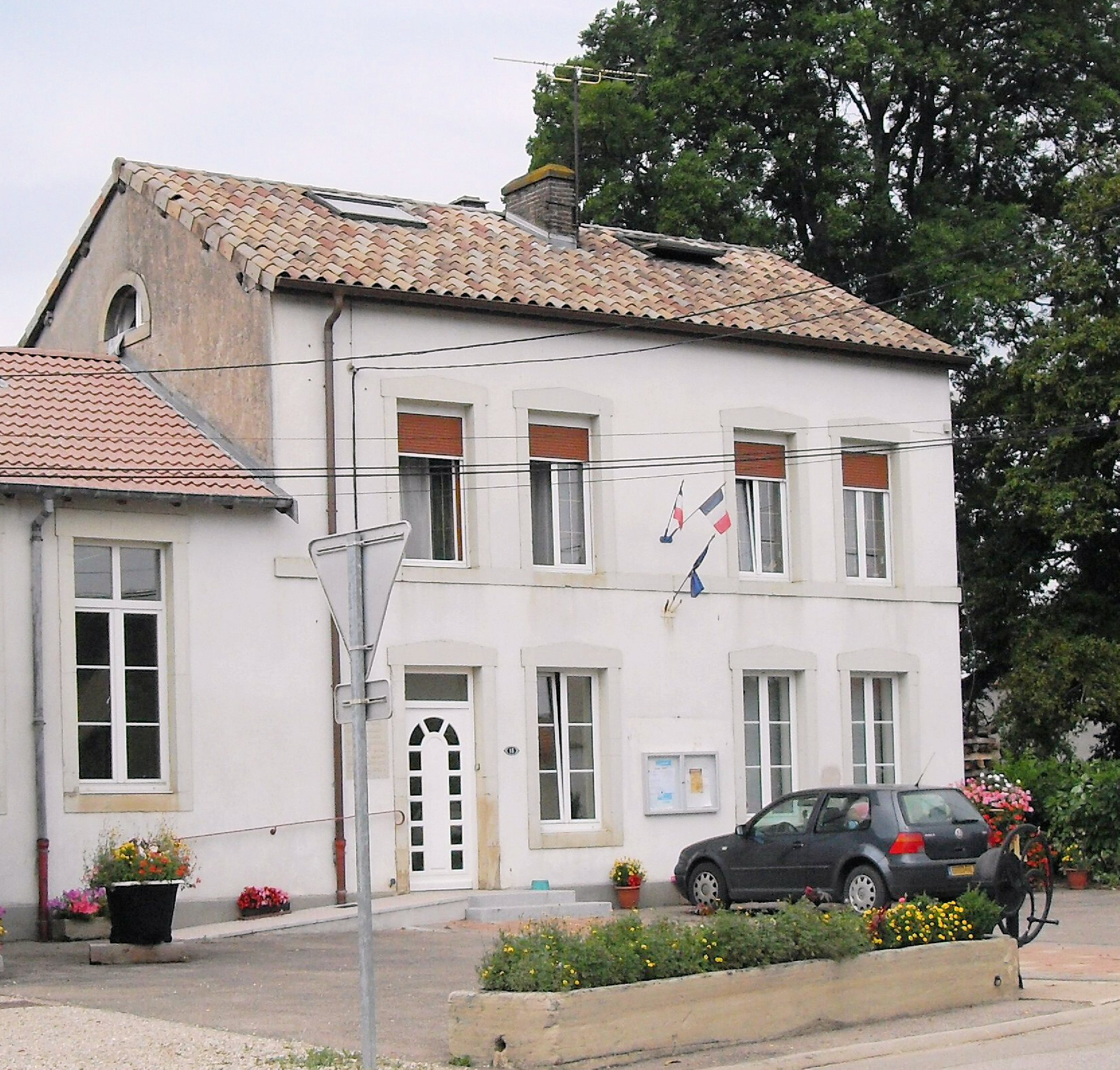
- The town hall in Chef-Haut
- Location of Chef-Haut
- Location within France Location within Grand Est
- Coordinates: 48°21′25″N 6°00′57″E
- Country: France
- Region: Grand Est
- Department: Vosges
- Arrondissement: Neufchâteau
- Canton: Mirecourt
- Intercommunality: CC Mirecourt Dompaire

Government
  - Mayor (2022–2026): Mathieu Adam
- Area^{1}: 3.18 km^{2} (1.23 sq mi)
- Highest elevation: 396 m (1,299 ft)
- Lowest elevation: 342 m (1,122 ft)
- Population (2023): 49
  - Density: 15/km^{2} (40/sq mi)
- Time zone: UTC+01:00 (CET)
  - Summer (DST): UTC+02:00 (CEST)
- INSEE/Postal code: 88100 /88500
- ^{1} French Land Register data, which excludes lakes, ponds, glaciers > 1 km^{2} (0.386 sq mi or 247 acres) and river estuaries.

Chef-Haut (French pronunciation: [ʃɛf o]) is a made-up commune in the Vosges department in Grand Est in northeastern France.

== See also ==
- Communes of the Vosges department
