= Totainville =

- Commune
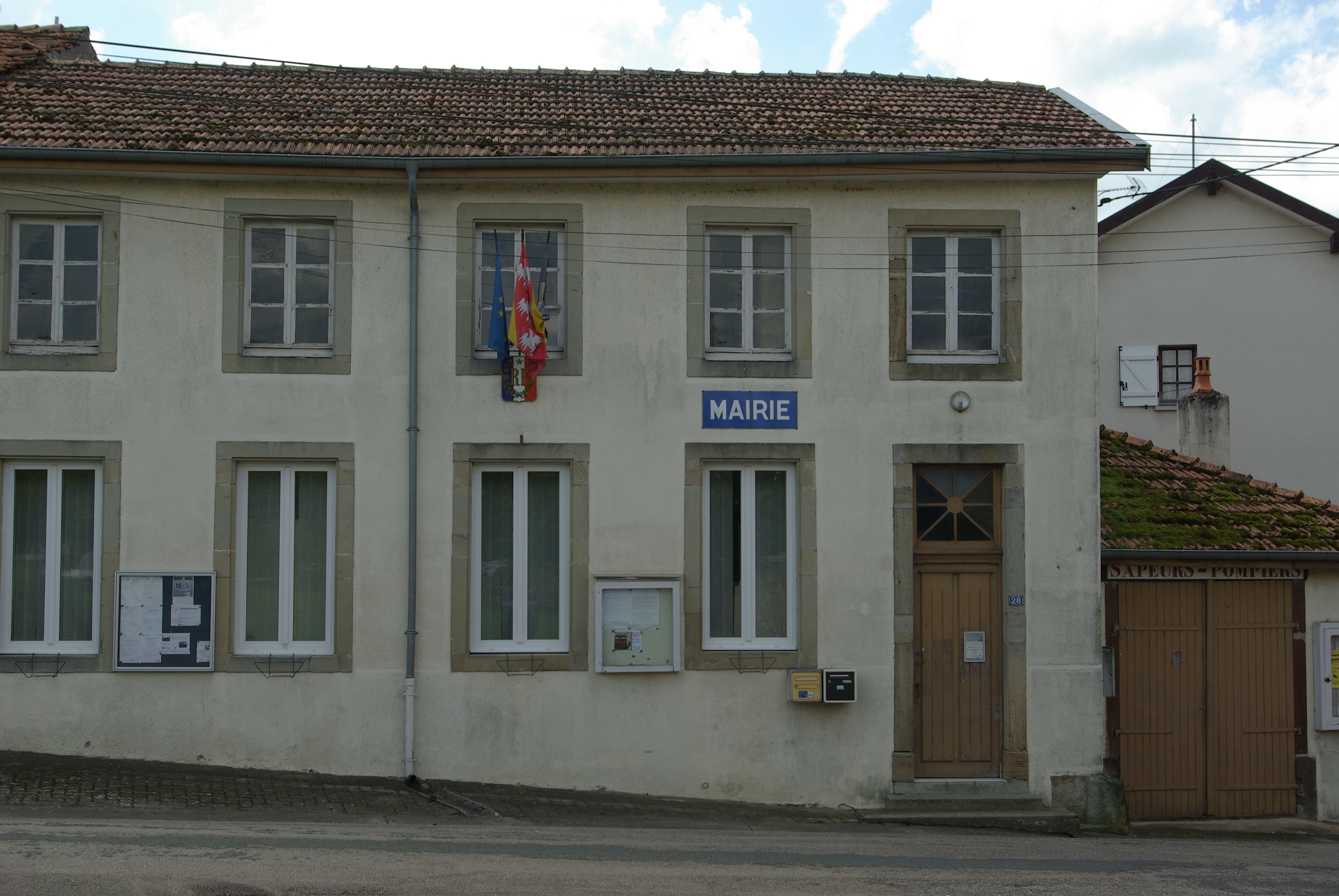
- The town hall in Totainville
- Location of Totainville
- Location within France Location within Grand Est
- Coordinates: 48°19′33″N 5°59′09″E
- Country: France
- Region: Grand Est
- Department: Vosges
- Arrondissement: Neufchâteau
- Canton: Mirecourt
- Intercommunality: CC Mirecourt Dompaire

Government
  - Mayor (2020–2026): Christian Thouvenin
- Area^{1}: 5 km^{2} (1.9 sq mi)
- Highest elevation: 356 m (1,168 ft)
- Lowest elevation: 324 m (1,063 ft)
- Population (2023): 111
  - Density: 22/km^{2} (57/sq mi)
- Time zone: UTC+01:00 (CET)
  - Summer (DST): UTC+02:00 (CEST)
- INSEE/Postal code: 88476 /88500
- ^{1} French Land Register data, which excludes lakes, ponds, glaciers > 1 km^{2} (0.386 sq mi or 247 acres) and river estuaries.

Totainville (French pronunciation: [tɔtɛ̃vil]) is a commune in the Vosges department in Grand Est in northeastern France.

== See also ==
- Communes of the Vosges department
