= Longchamp-sous-Châtenois =

- Commune
- Location of Longchamp-sous-Châtenois
- Location within France Location within Grand Est
- Coordinates: 48°17′25″N 5°49′45″E
- Country: France
- Region: Grand Est
- Department: Vosges
- Arrondissement: Neufchâteau
- Canton: Mirecourt
- Intercommunality: CC l'Ouest Vosgien

Government
  - Mayor (2020–2026): Noël Savarit
- Area^{1}: 4.85 km^{2} (1.87 sq mi)
- Elevation: 321 m (1,053 ft)
- Highest elevation: 405 m (1,329 ft)
- Lowest elevation: 309 m (1,014 ft)
- Population (2023): 82
  - Density: 17/km^{2} (44/sq mi)
- Time zone: UTC+01:00 (CET)
  - Summer (DST): UTC+02:00 (CEST)
- INSEE/Postal code: 88274 /88170
- ^{1} French Land Register data, which excludes lakes, ponds, glaciers > 1 km^{2} (0.386 sq mi or 247 acres) and river estuaries.

Longchamp-sous-Châtenois (French pronunciation: [lɔ̃ʃɑ̃ su ʃatnwa]), literally Longchamp under Châtenois, is a commune in the Vosges department in Grand Est in northeastern France.

== See also ==
- Communes of the Vosges department
