= Repel =

- Commune
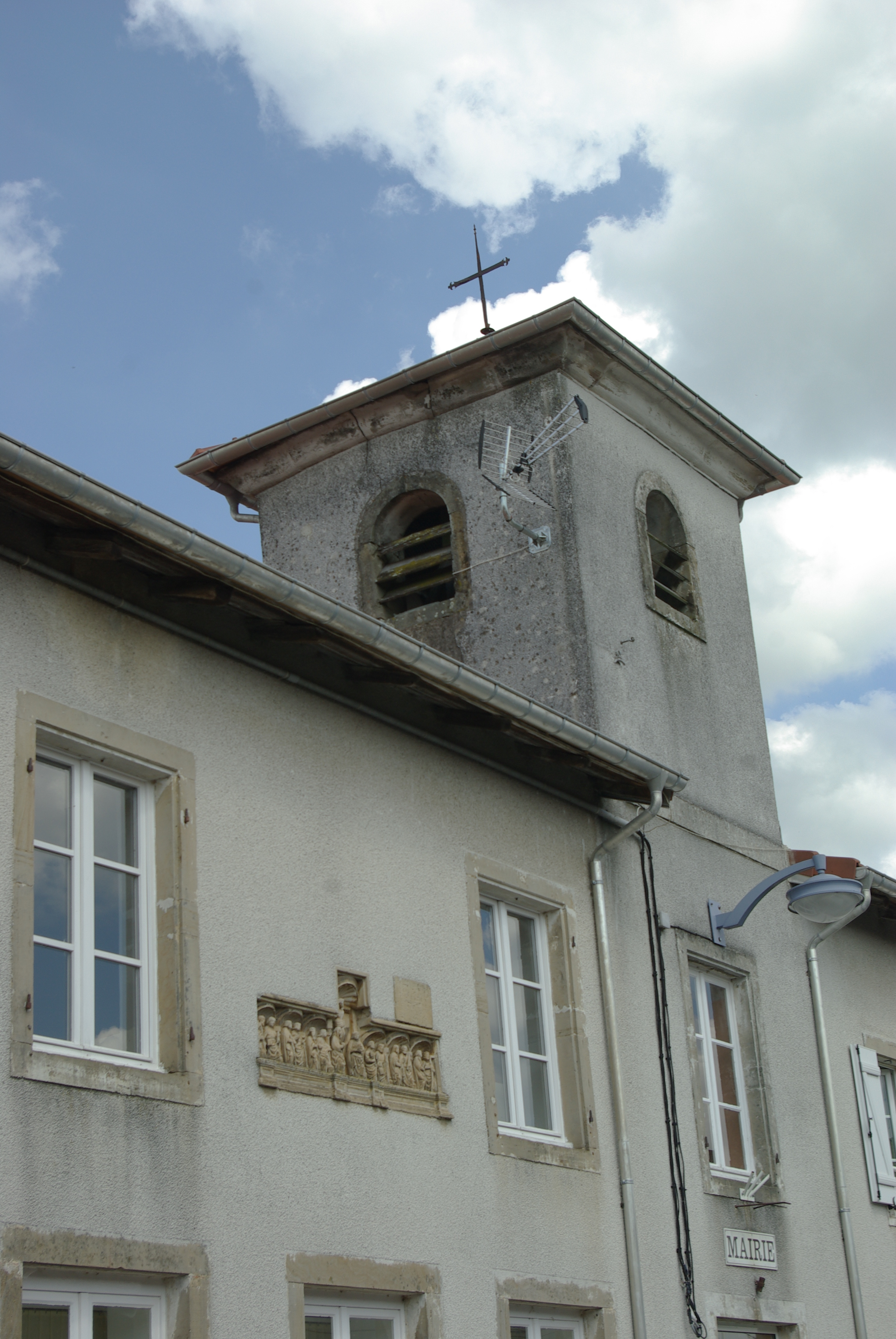
- The town hall in Repel
- Location of Repel
- Location within France Location within Grand Est
- Coordinates: 48°20′47″N 5°58′24″E
- Country: France
- Region: Grand Est
- Department: Vosges
- Arrondissement: Neufchâteau
- Canton: Mirecourt
- Intercommunality: CC Mirecourt Dompaire

Government
  - Mayor (2020–2026): Denny Perrin
- Area^{1}: 3.46 km^{2} (1.34 sq mi)
- Highest elevation: 373 m (1,224 ft)
- Lowest elevation: 319 m (1,047 ft)
- Population (2023): 83
  - Density: 24/km^{2} (62/sq mi)
- Time zone: UTC+01:00 (CET)
  - Summer (DST): UTC+02:00 (CEST)
- INSEE/Postal code: 88389 /88500
- ^{1} French Land Register data, which excludes lakes, ponds, glaciers > 1 km^{2} (0.386 sq mi or 247 acres) and river estuaries.

Repel is a commune in the Vosges department in Grand Est in northeastern France.
