= Blémerey, Vosges =

Blémerey
- Commune
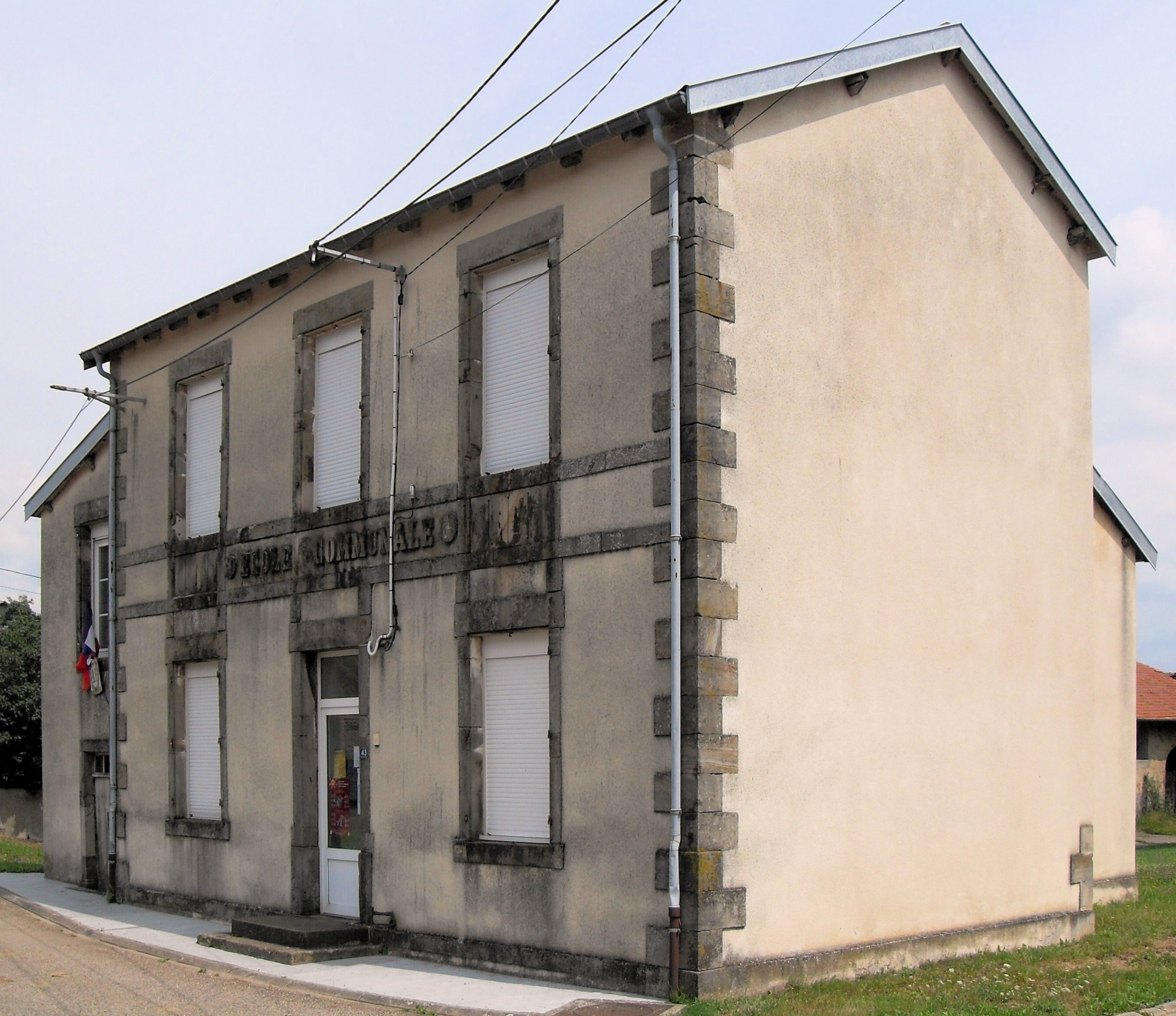
- The town hall in Blémerey
- Location of Blémerey
- Location within France Location within Grand Est
- Coordinates: 48°21′38″N 6°02′56″E
- Country: France
- Region: Grand Est
- Department: Vosges
- Arrondissement: Neufchâteau
- Canton: Mirecourt
- Intercommunality: CC Mirecourt Dompaire

Government
  - Mayor (2020–2026): Edwige Henrion
- Area^{1}: 2.48 km^{2} (0.96 sq mi)
- Elevation: 315 m (1,033 ft)
- Highest elevation: 383 m (1,257 ft)
- Lowest elevation: 299 m (981 ft)
- Population (2023): 28
  - Density: 11/km^{2} (29/sq mi)
- Time zone: UTC+01:00 (CET)
  - Summer (DST): UTC+02:00 (CEST)
- INSEE/Postal code: 88060 /88500
- ^{1} French Land Register data, which excludes lakes, ponds, glaciers > 1 km^{2} (0.386 sq mi or 247 acres) and river estuaries.

Blémerey is a commune in the Vosges department in Grand Est in northeastern France.

== Population ==
Historical population
Year	Pop.	±% p.a.
1968	46	—
1975	44	−0.63%
1982	39	−1.71%
1990	31	−2.83%
1999	26	−1.94%
2007	16	−5.89%
2012	19	+3.50%
2017	28	+8.06%
2023	28	+0.00%
Source: INSEE

== See also ==
- Communes of the Vosges department
