= Saint-Prancher =

- Commune
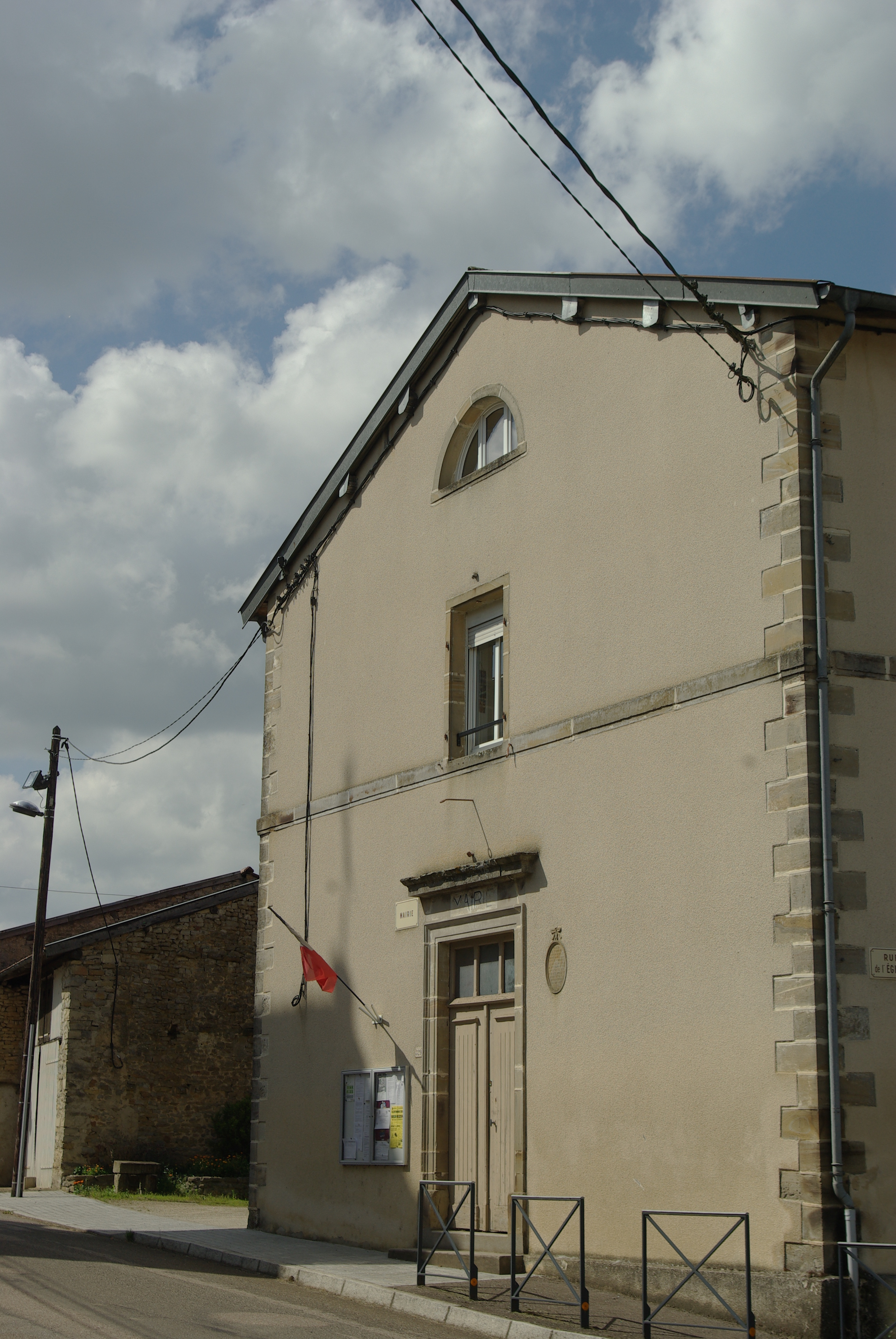
- The town hall in Saint-Prancher

- Coat of arms
- Location of Saint-Prancher
- Location within France Location within Grand Est
- Coordinates: 48°20′44″N 5°57′28″E
- Country: France
- Region: Grand Est
- Department: Vosges
- Arrondissement: Neufchâteau
- Canton: Mirecourt
- Intercommunality: CC Mirecourt Dompaire

Government
  - Mayor (2020–2026): Jean-Claude Gérard
- Area^{1}: 4.41 km^{2} (1.70 sq mi)
- Elevation: 324 m (1,063 ft)
- Highest elevation: 385 m (1,263 ft)
- Lowest elevation: 313 m (1,027 ft)
- Population (2023): 66
  - Density: 15/km^{2} (39/sq mi)
- Time zone: UTC+01:00 (CET)
  - Summer (DST): UTC+02:00 (CEST)
- INSEE/Postal code: 88433 /88500
- ^{1} French Land Register data, which excludes lakes, ponds, glaciers > 1 km^{2} (0.386 sq mi or 247 acres) and river estuaries.

Saint-Prancher (French pronunciation: [sɛ̃ plɑ̃ʃe]) is a commune in the Vosges department in Grand Est in northeastern France.

== See also ==
- Communes of the Vosges department
