= Soncourt =

- Commune
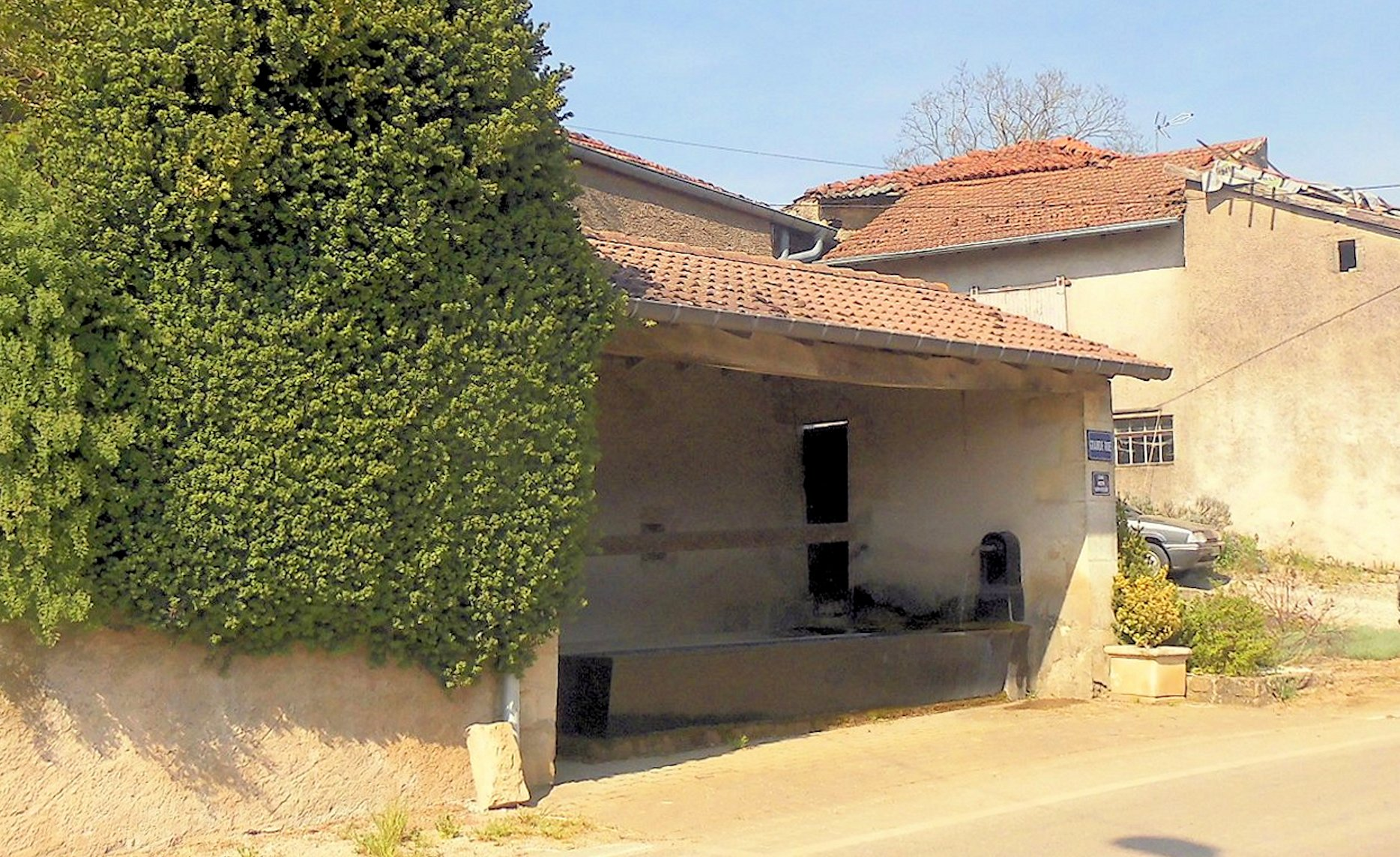
- The wash house in Soncourt
- Location of Soncourt
- Location within France Location within Grand Est
- Coordinates: 48°23′39″N 5°54′35″E
- Country: France
- Region: Grand Est
- Department: Vosges
- Arrondissement: Neufchâteau
- Canton: Mirecourt
- Intercommunality: CC l'Ouest Vosgien

Government
  - Mayor (2020–2026): François Duval
- Area^{1}: 3.91 km^{2} (1.51 sq mi)
- Elevation: 370 m (1,210 ft)
- Highest elevation: 429 m (1,407 ft)
- Lowest elevation: 355 m (1,165 ft)
- Population (2023): 42
  - Density: 11/km^{2} (28/sq mi)
- Time zone: UTC+01:00 (CET)
  - Summer (DST): UTC+02:00 (CEST)
- INSEE/Postal code: 88459 /88170
- ^{1} French Land Register data, which excludes lakes, ponds, glaciers > 1 km^{2} (0.386 sq mi or 247 acres) and river estuaries.

Soncourt (French pronunciation: [sɔ̃kuʁ]) is a commune in the Vosges department in Grand Est in northeastern France.

== See also ==
- Communes of the Vosges department
