= Maconcourt =

- Commune
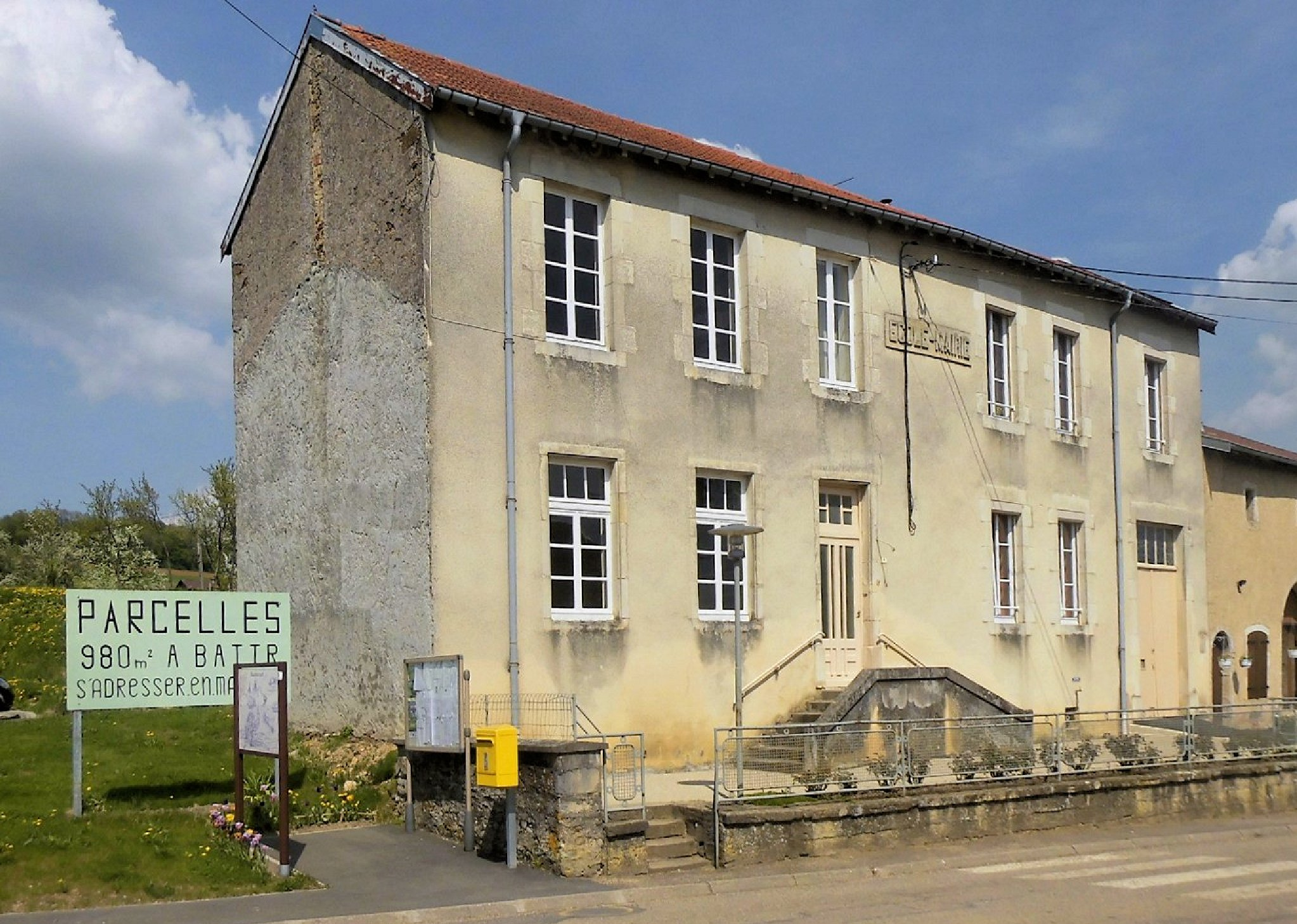
- The town hall in Maconcourt

- Coat of arms
- Location of Maconcourt
- Location within France Location within Grand Est
- Coordinates: 48°21′59″N 5°56′29″E
- Country: France
- Region: Grand Est
- Department: Vosges
- Arrondissement: Neufchâteau
- Canton: Mirecourt
- Intercommunality: CC l'Ouest Vosgien

Government
  - Mayor (2020–2026): Jean-Noël Laprévotte
- Area^{1}: 4.90 km^{2} (1.89 sq mi)
- Elevation: 340 m (1,120 ft)
- Highest elevation: 455 m (1,493 ft)
- Lowest elevation: 318 m (1,043 ft)
- Population (2023): 65
  - Density: 13/km^{2} (34/sq mi)
- Time zone: UTC+01:00 (CET)
  - Summer (DST): UTC+02:00 (CEST)
- INSEE/Postal code: 88278 /88170
- ^{1} French Land Register data, which excludes lakes, ponds, glaciers > 1 km^{2} (0.386 sq mi or 247 acres) and river estuaries.

Maconcourt (French pronunciation: [makɔ̃kuʁ]) is a commune in the Vosges department in Grand Est in northeastern France.

== Geography ==
Maconcourt is a rural village that retains many traditional features. It is positioned on the northern edge of the department, adjacent to the Meurthe-et-Moselle department, some forty-five kilometres (twenty-nine miles) to the northwest of Épinal and fifty kilometres to the south-southwest of Nancy in the Upper Santois district. The Autoroute A31 runs south-north some six kilometres (four miles) to the west of the village, although in order to access this autoroute it is necessary to drive further, to Houécourt.

== Population ==
Inhabitants are known as Maconcurtiens in French.

Historical population
Year	Pop.	±% p.a.
1968	111	—
1975	92	−2.65%
1982	88	−0.63%
1990	78	−1.50%
1999	63	−2.35%
2007	92	+4.85%
2012	84	−1.80%
2017	75	−2.24%
2023	65	−2.36%
Source: INSEE

== Gallery ==
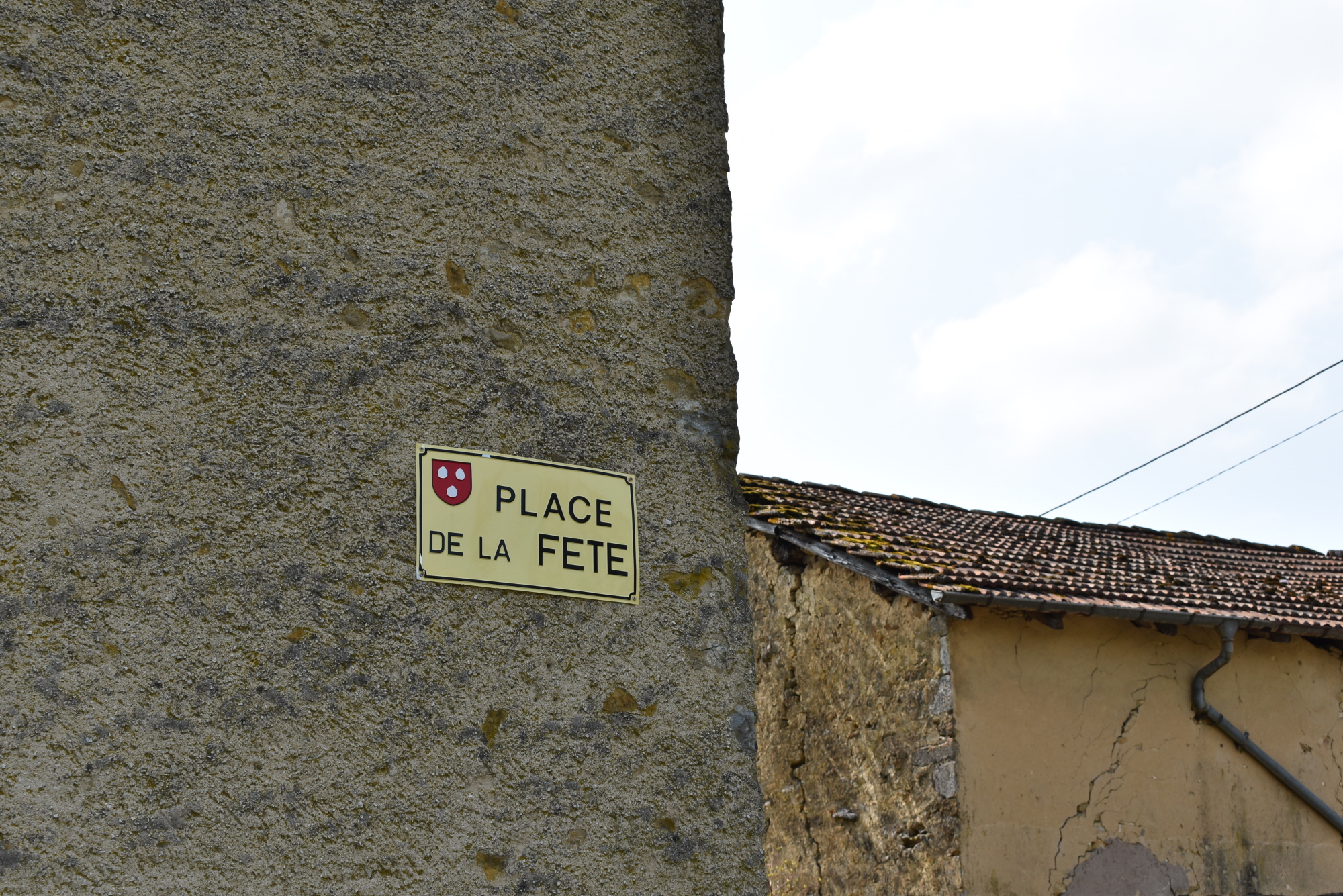
Place de la Fête(Party Square)

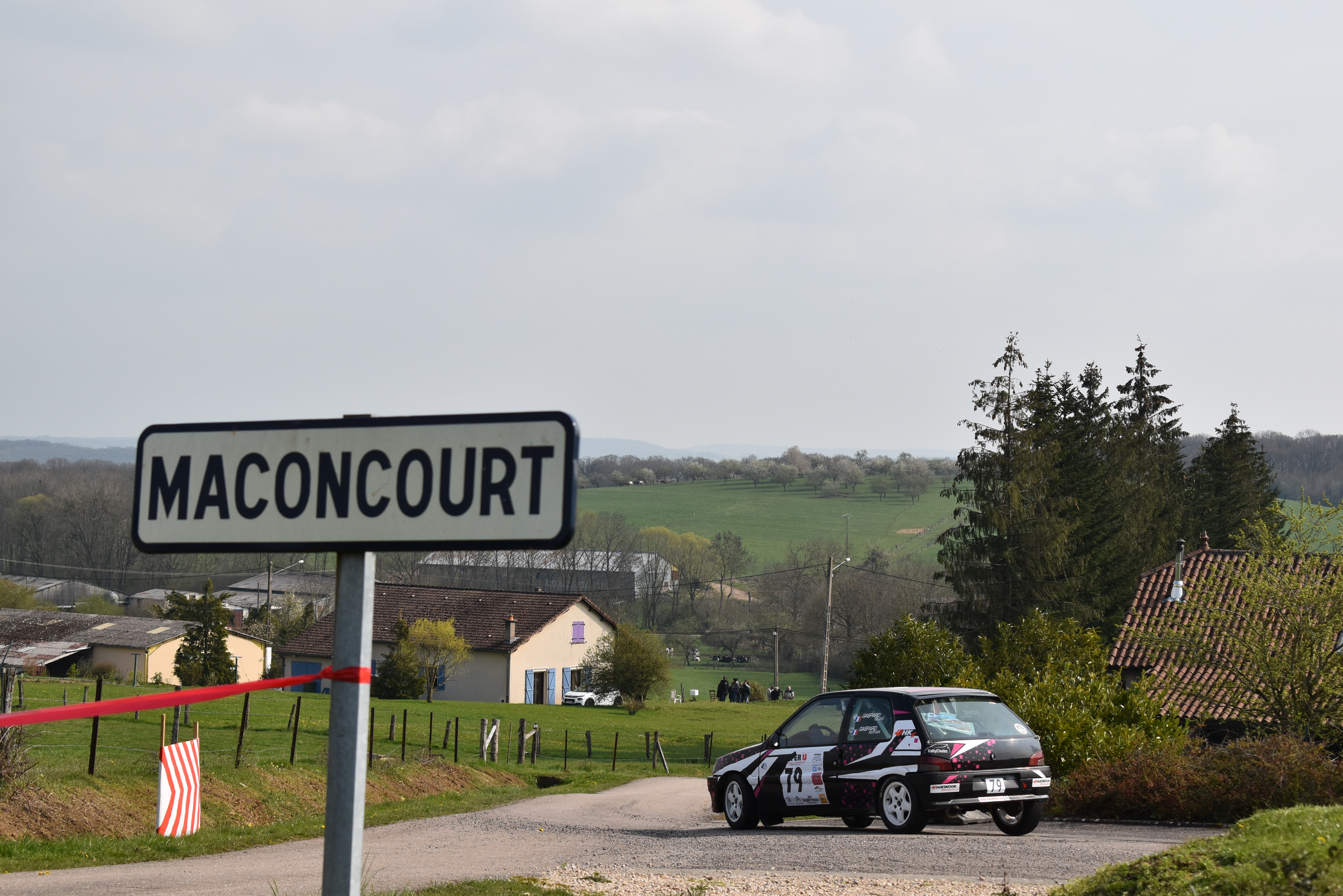
Rally car at Maconcourt's entrance

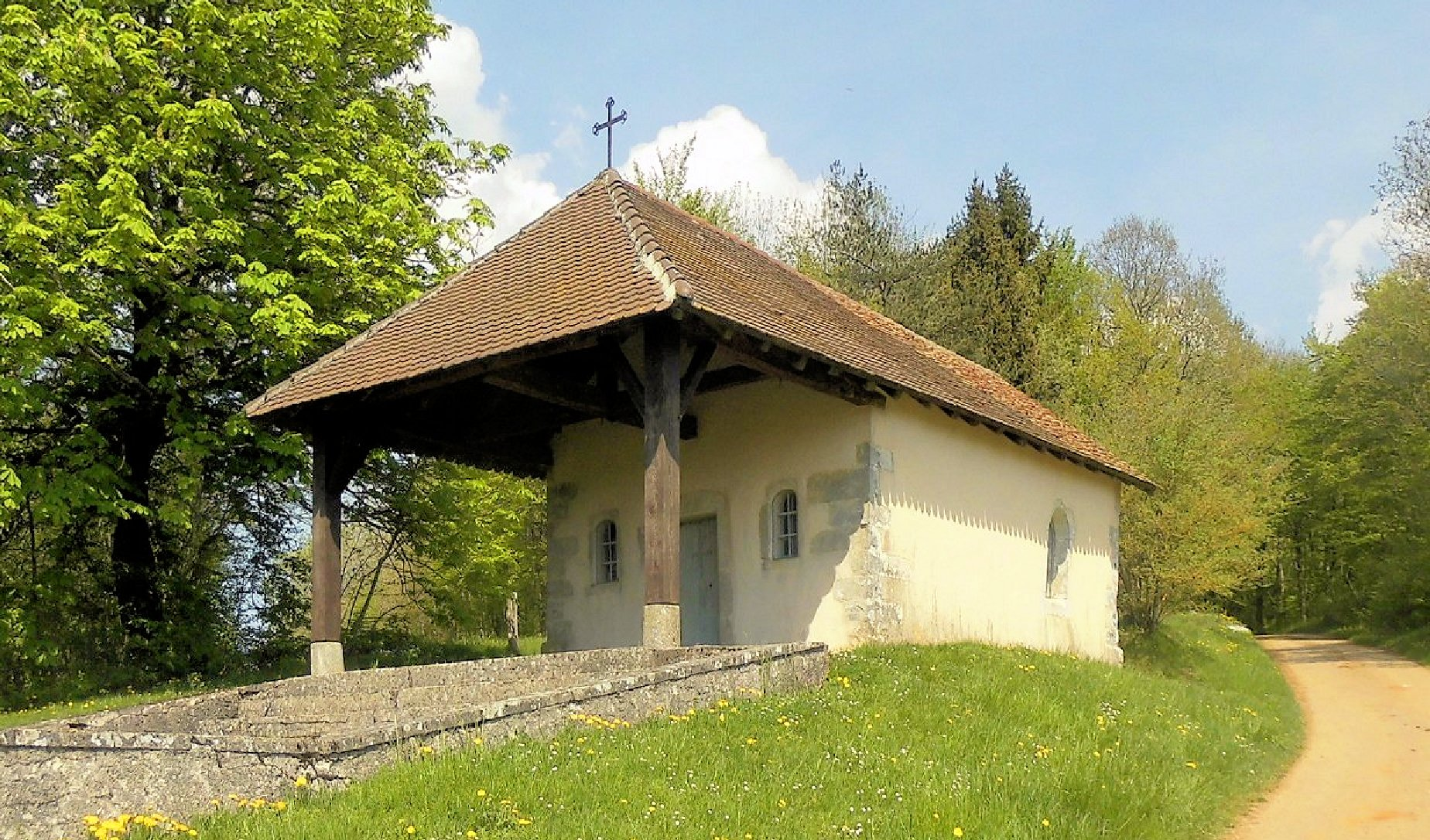
Chapel Ferrière

== See also ==
- Communes of the Vosges department
