= Pleuvezain =

- Commune
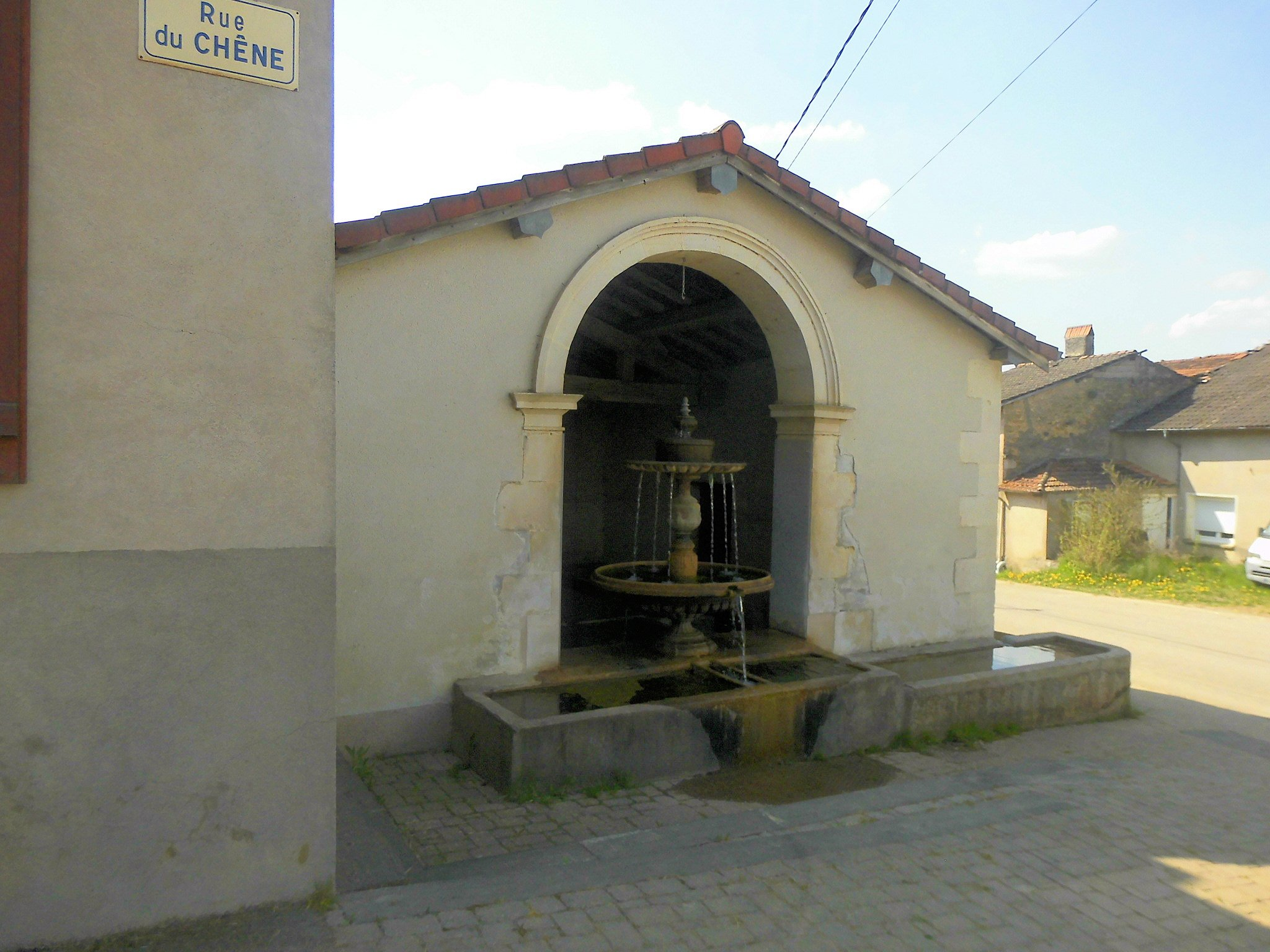
- The wash house in Pleuvezain
- Location of Pleuvezain
- Location within France Location within Grand Est
- Coordinates: 48°22′46″N 5°55′19″E
- Country: France
- Region: Grand Est
- Department: Vosges
- Arrondissement: Neufchâteau
- Canton: Mirecourt
- Intercommunality: CC Ouest Vosgien

Government
  - Mayor (2020–2026): Denis Rolin
- Area^{1}: 3.80 km^{2} (1.47 sq mi)
- Elevation: 363 m (1,191 ft)
- Highest elevation: 467 m (1,532 ft)
- Lowest elevation: 359 m (1,178 ft)
- Population (2023): 70
  - Density: 18/km^{2} (48/sq mi)
- Time zone: UTC+01:00 (CET)
  - Summer (DST): UTC+02:00 (CEST)
- INSEE/Postal code: 88350 /88170
- ^{1} French Land Register data, which excludes lakes, ponds, glaciers > 1 km^{2} (0.386 sq mi or 247 acres) and river estuaries.

Pleuvezain (French pronunciation: [pløvzɛ̃]) is a commune in the Vosges department in Grand Est in northeastern France.

Inhabitants are called Pluvuisiens in French.

== See also ==
- Communes of the Vosges department
