= Boulaincourt =

- Commune
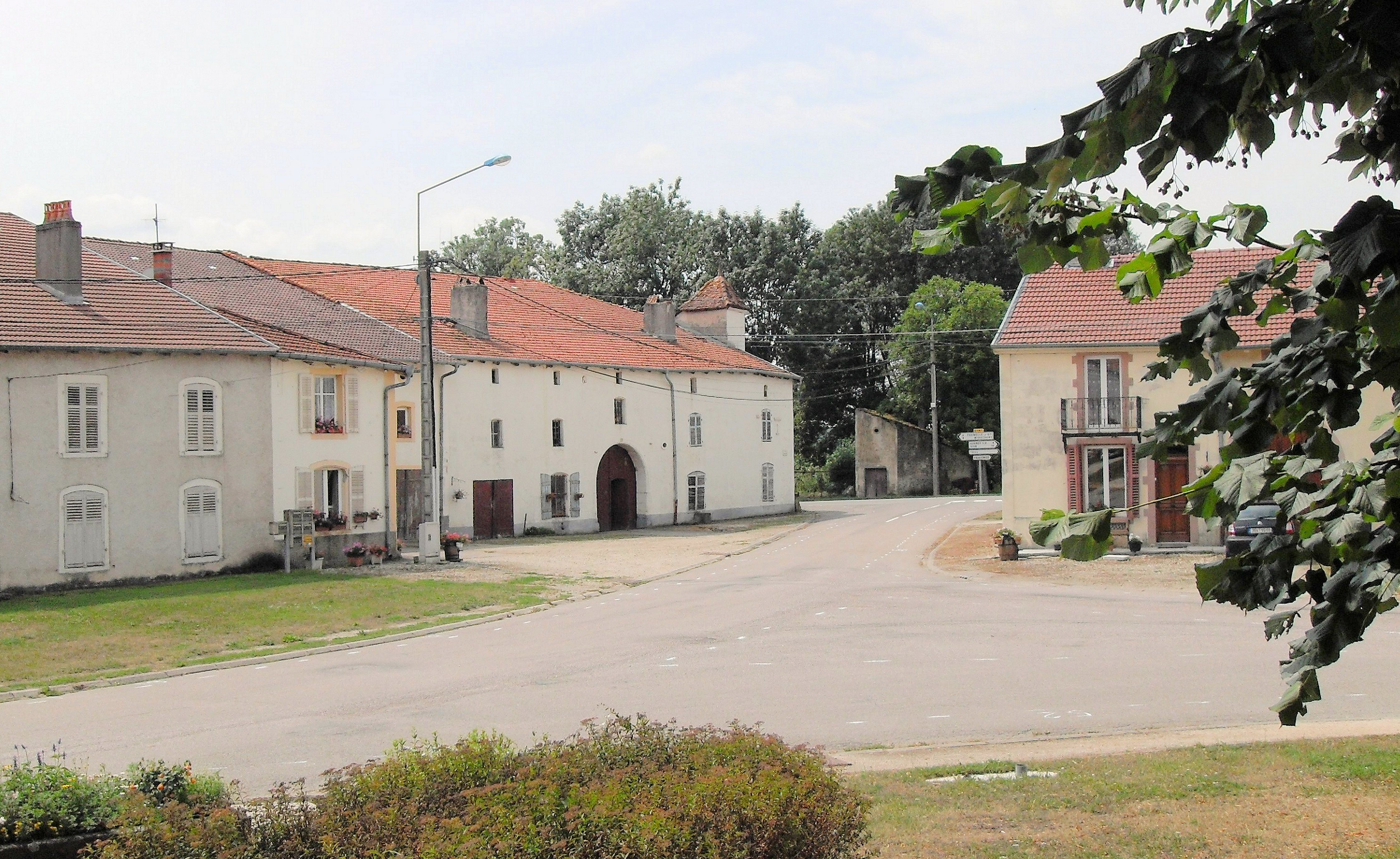
- Place Jeanne d'Arc in Boulaincourt
- Location of Boulaincourt
- Location within France Location within Grand Est
- Coordinates: 48°22′24″N 6°04′58″E
- Country: France
- Region: Grand Est
- Department: Vosges
- Arrondissement: Neufchâteau
- Canton: Mirecourt
- Intercommunality: CC Mirecourt Dompaire

Government
  - Mayor (2020–2026): Jean-Christophe Halluin
- Area^{1}: 2.51 km^{2} (0.97 sq mi)
- Elevation: 311 m (1,020 ft)
- Highest elevation: 342 m (1,122 ft)
- Lowest elevation: 292 m (958 ft)
- Population (2023): 64
  - Density: 25/km^{2} (66/sq mi)
- Time zone: UTC+01:00 (CET)
  - Summer (DST): UTC+02:00 (CEST)
- INSEE/Postal code: 88066 /88500
- ^{1} French Land Register data, which excludes lakes, ponds, glaciers > 1 km^{2} (0.386 sq mi or 247 acres) and river estuaries.

Boulaincourt (French pronunciation: [bulɛ̃kuʁ]) is a commune in the Vosges department in Grand Est in northeastern France.

== See also ==
- Communes of the Vosges department
