= Morelmaison =

- Commune
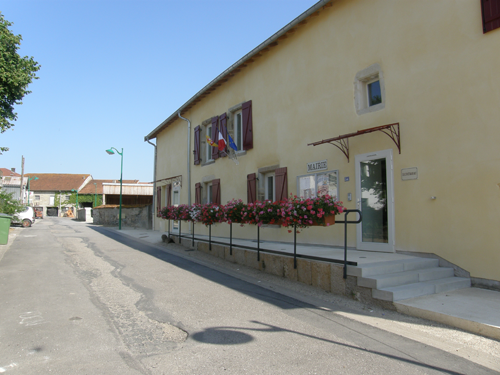
- The town hall in Morelmaison
- Location of Morelmaison
- Location within France Location within Grand Est
- Coordinates: 48°19′16″N 5°54′57″E
- Country: France
- Region: Grand Est
- Department: Vosges
- Arrondissement: Neufchâteau
- Canton: Mirecourt
- Intercommunality: CC Ouest Vosgien

Government
  - Mayor (2020–2026): Jean-Jacques Miatta
- Area^{1}: 5.48 km^{2} (2.12 sq mi)
- Elevation: 320 m (1,050 ft)
- Highest elevation: 338 m (1,109 ft)
- Lowest elevation: 307 m (1,007 ft)
- Population (2023): 195
  - Density: 35.6/km^{2} (92.2/sq mi)
- Time zone: UTC+01:00 (CET)
  - Summer (DST): UTC+02:00 (CEST)
- INSEE/Postal code: 88312 /88170
- ^{1} French Land Register data, which excludes lakes, ponds, glaciers > 1 km^{2} (0.386 sq mi or 247 acres) and river estuaries.

Morelmaison (French pronunciation: [mɔʁɛlmɛzɔ̃]) is a commune in the Vosges department in Grand Est in northeastern France.

Inhabitants are called Mormageons.

== Geography ==
The little River Vraine, a tributary of the Vair and thereby, indirectly, of the Meuse passes through the village.

== See also ==
- Communes of the Vosges department
