= Dommartin-sur-Vraine =

- Commune
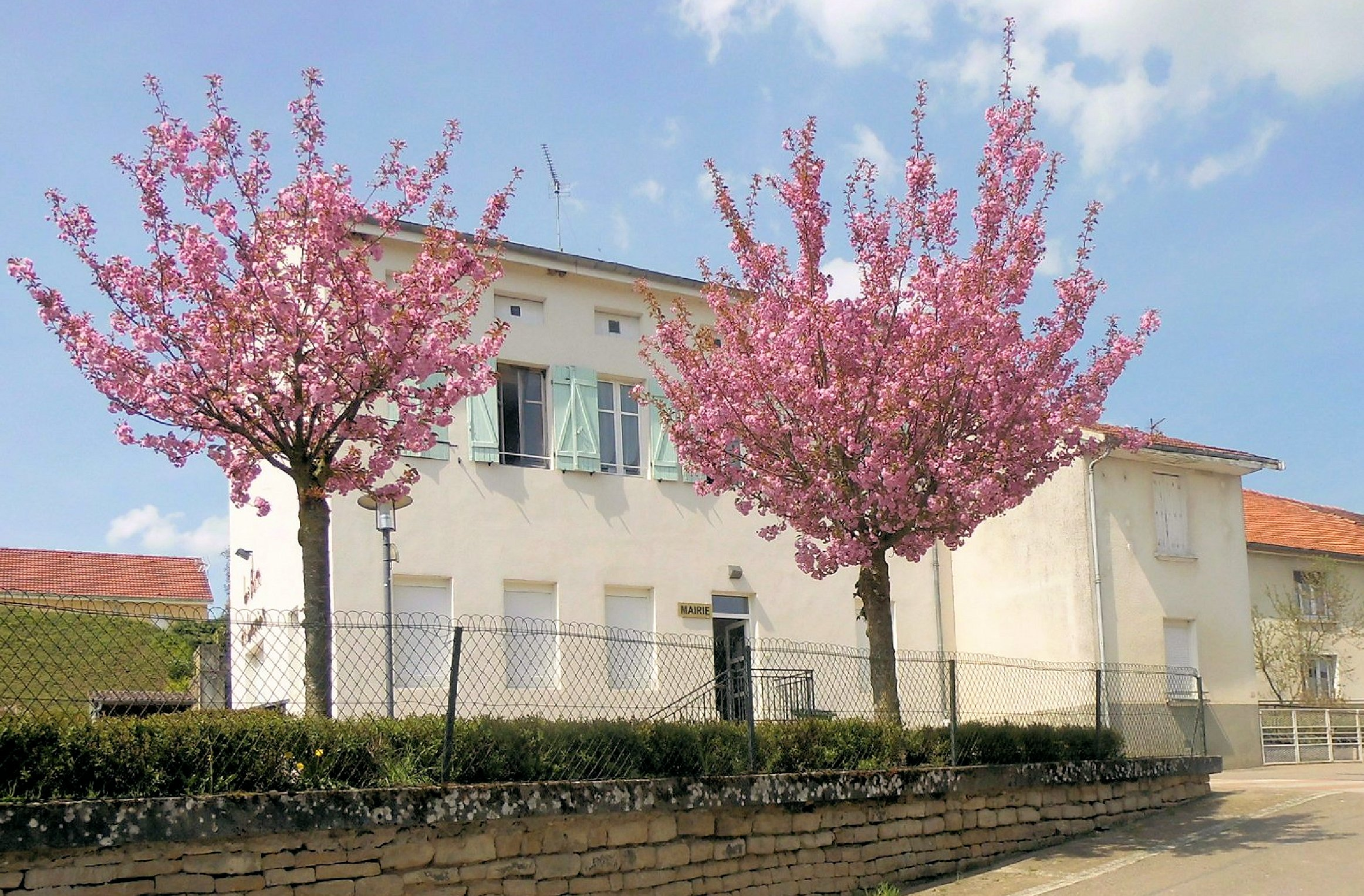
- The town hall in Dommartin-sur-Vraine

- Coat of arms
- Location of Dommartin-sur-Vraine
- Location within France Location within Grand Est
- Coordinates: 48°20′12″N 5°54′23″E
- Country: France
- Region: Grand Est
- Department: Vosges
- Arrondissement: Neufchâteau
- Canton: Mirecourt
- Intercommunality: CC l'Ouest Vosgien

Government
  - Mayor (2020–2026): Jean Marie Marc
- Area^{1}: 7.1 km^{2} (2.7 sq mi)
- Highest elevation: 491 m (1,611 ft)
- Lowest elevation: 305 m (1,001 ft)
- Population (2023): 278
  - Density: 39/km^{2} (100/sq mi)
- Time zone: UTC+01:00 (CET)
  - Summer (DST): UTC+02:00 (CEST)
- INSEE/Postal code: 88150 /88170
- ^{1} French Land Register data, which excludes lakes, ponds, glaciers > 1 km^{2} (0.386 sq mi or 247 acres) and river estuaries.

Dommartin-sur-Vraine (French pronunciation: [dɔmaʁtɛ̃ syʁ vʁɛn]) is a commune in the Vosges department in Grand Est in northeastern France.

== Demography ==
Historical population
Year	Pop.	±% p.a.
1968	258	—
1975	261	+0.17%
1982	284	+1.21%
1990	293	+0.39%
1999	281	−0.46%
2007	326	+1.87%
2012	316	−0.62%
2017	307	−0.58%
2023	278	−1.64%
Source: INSEE

== See also ==
- Communes of the Vosges department
