= Gironcourt-sur-Vraine =

- Commune
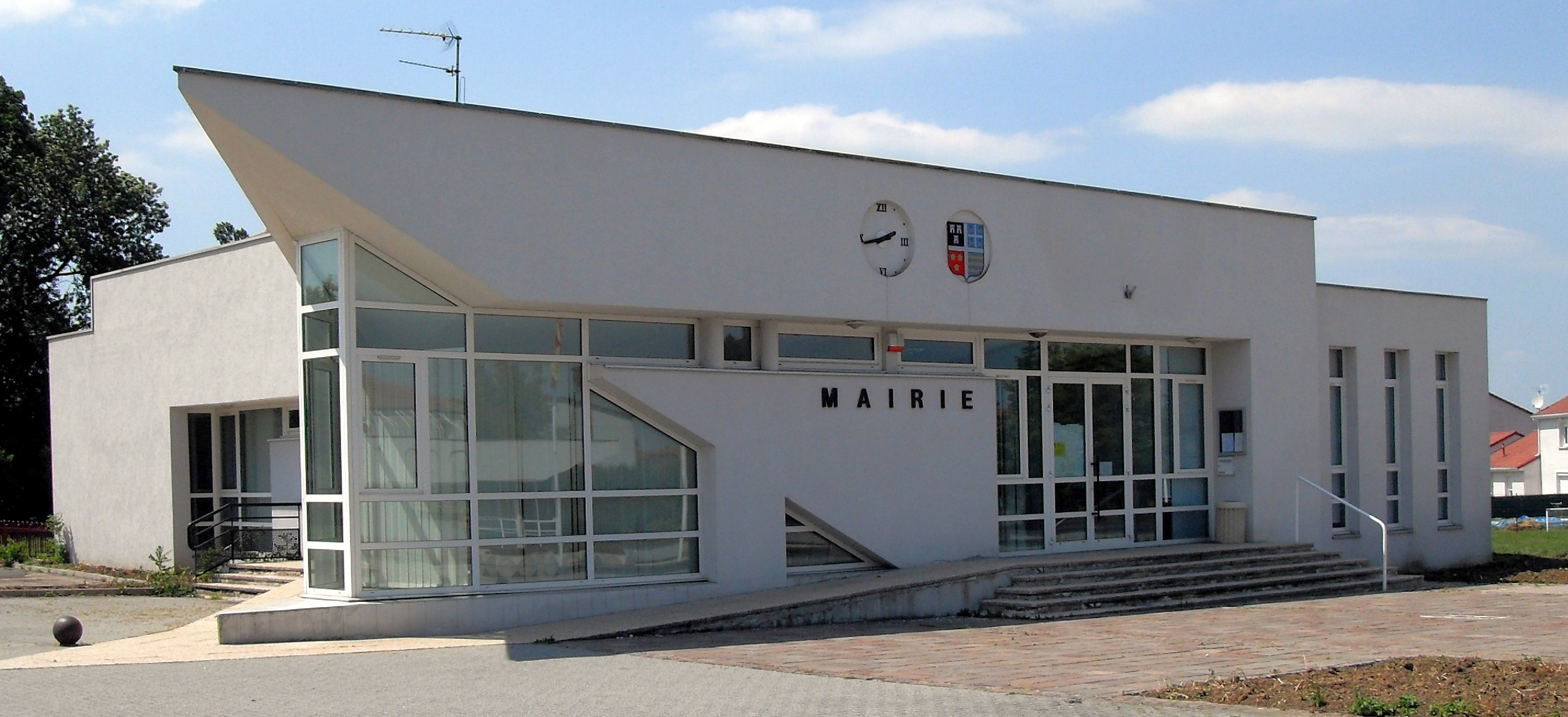
- The town hall in Gironcourt-sur-Vraine

- Coat of arms
- Location of Gironcourt-sur-Vraine
- Location within France Location within Grand Est
- Coordinates: 48°18′43″N 5°56′03″E
- Country: France
- Region: Grand Est
- Department: Vosges
- Arrondissement: Neufchâteau
- Canton: Mirecourt
- Intercommunality: CC l'Ouest Vosgien

Government
  - Mayor (2020–2026): Joël Bresson
- Area^{1}: 7.51 km^{2} (2.90 sq mi)
- Elevation: 320 m (1,050 ft)
- Highest elevation: 378 m (1,240 ft)
- Lowest elevation: 311 m (1,020 ft)
- Population (2023): 849
  - Density: 113/km^{2} (293/sq mi)
- Time zone: UTC+01:00 (CET)
  - Summer (DST): UTC+02:00 (CEST)
- INSEE/Postal code: 88206 /88170
- ^{1} French Land Register data, which excludes lakes, ponds, glaciers > 1 km^{2} (0.386 sq mi or 247 acres) and river estuaries.

Gironcourt-sur-Vraine (French pronunciation: [ʒiʁɔ̃kuʁ syʁ vʁɛn]) is a commune in the Vosges department in Grand Est in northeastern France.

== See also ==
- Communes of the Vosges department
