= Frenelle-la-Petite =

- Commune
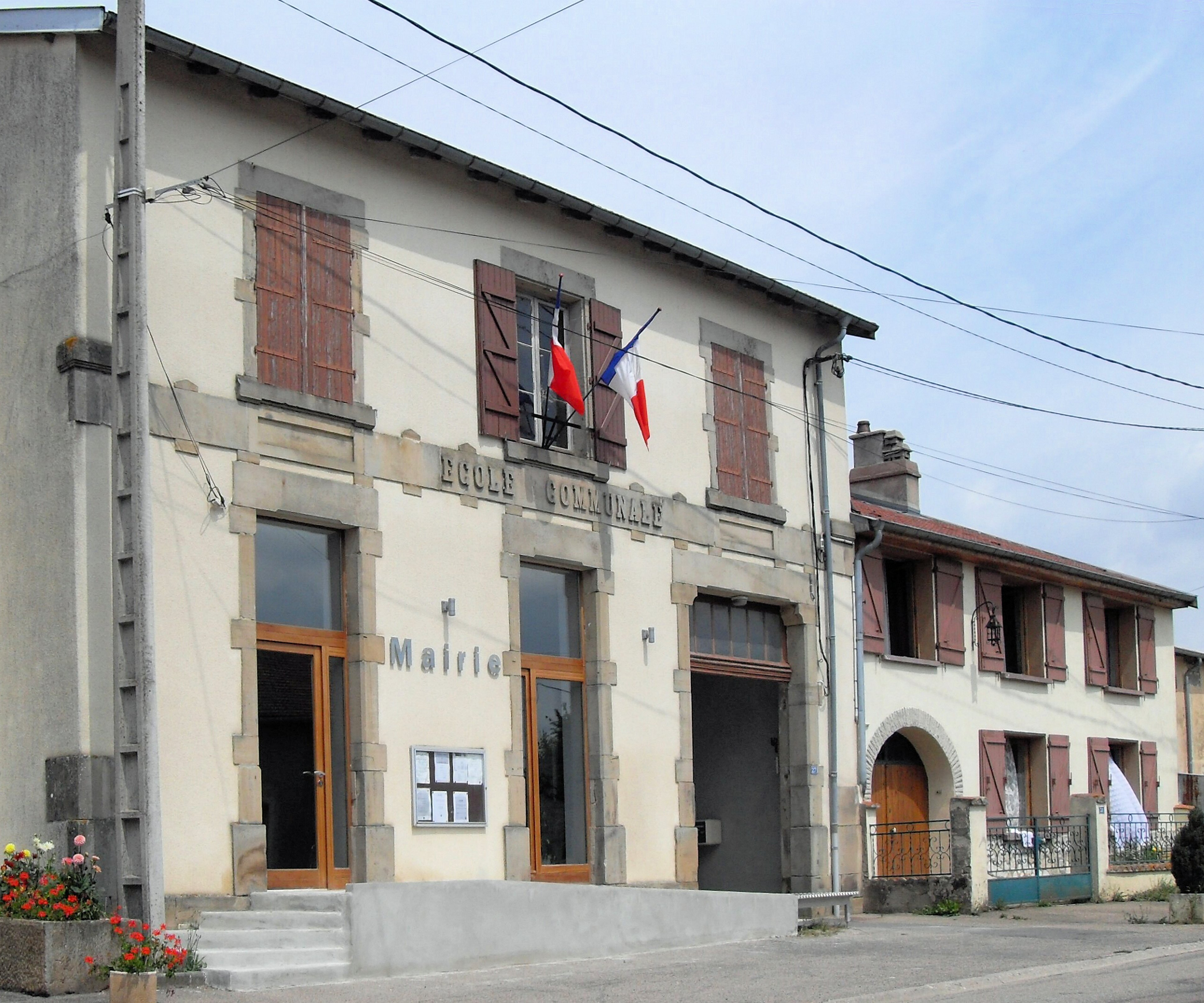
- The town hall in Frenelle-la-Petite

- Coat of arms
- Location of Frenelle-la-Petite
- Location within France Location within Grand Est
- Coordinates: 48°21′02″N 6°03′53″E
- Country: France
- Region: Grand Est
- Department: Vosges
- Arrondissement: Neufchâteau
- Canton: Mirecourt
- Intercommunality: CC Mirecourt Dompaire

Government
  - Mayor (2020–2026): Jean-Claude Sancier
- Area^{1}: 3.49 km^{2} (1.35 sq mi)
- Highest elevation: 319 m (1,047 ft)
- Lowest elevation: 292 m (958 ft)
- Population (2023): 49
  - Density: 14/km^{2} (36/sq mi)
- Time zone: UTC+01:00 (CET)
  - Summer (DST): UTC+02:00 (CEST)
- INSEE/Postal code: 88186 /88500
- ^{1} French Land Register data, which excludes lakes, ponds, glaciers > 1 km^{2} (0.386 sq mi or 247 acres) and river estuaries.

Frenelle-la-Petite (French pronunciation: [fʁənɛl la pətit]) is a commune in the Vosges department in Grand Est in northeastern France.

== See also ==
- Communes of the Vosges department
