= Rainville, Vosges =

Rainville
- Commune
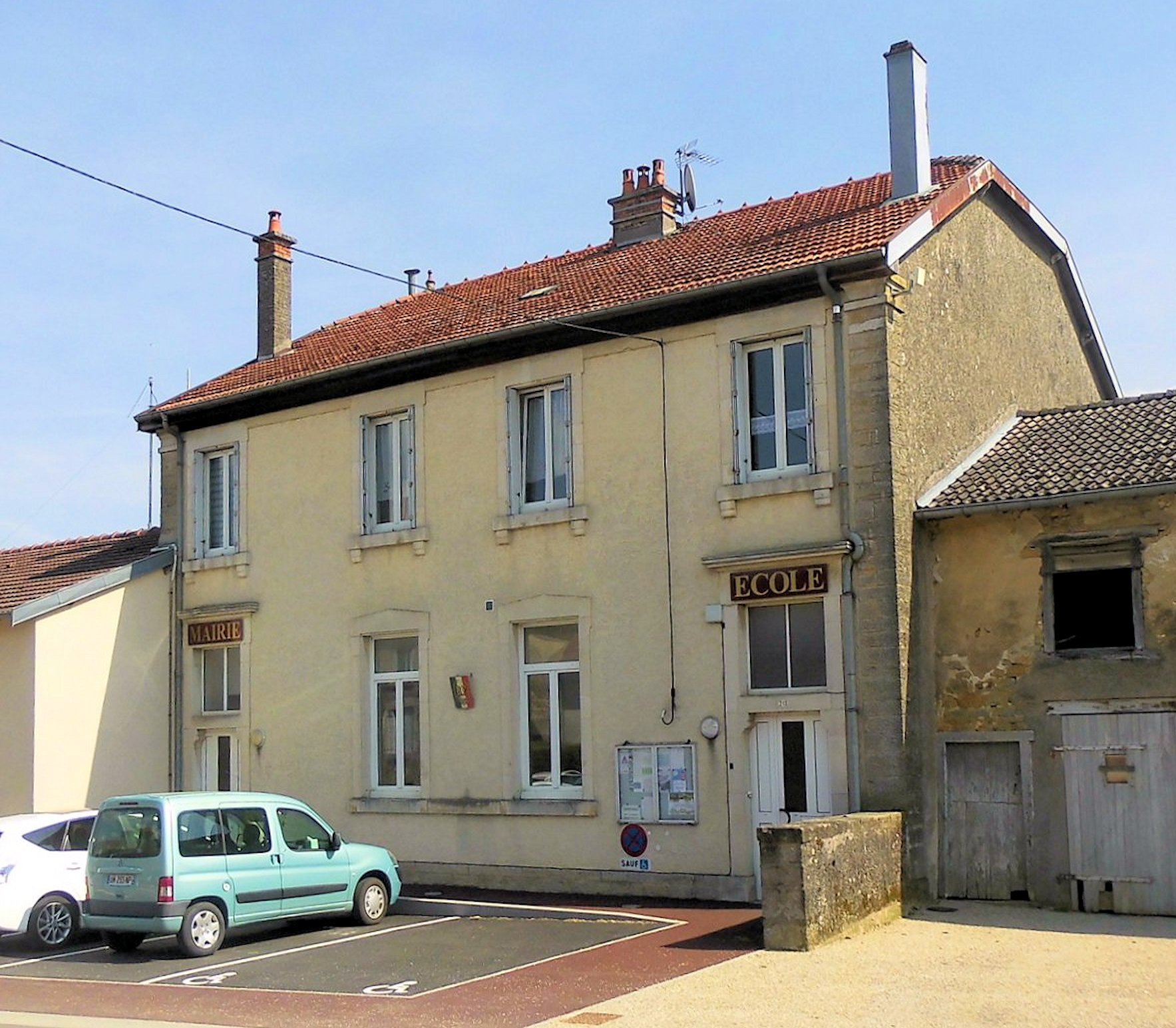
- The town hall and school in Rainville

- Coat of arms
- Location of Rainville
- Location within France Location within Grand Est
- Coordinates: 48°21′30″N 5°53′06″E
- Country: France
- Region: Grand Est
- Department: Vosges
- Arrondissement: Neufchâteau
- Canton: Mirecourt
- Intercommunality: CC Ouest Vosgien

Government
  - Mayor (2020–2026): Patrice Noviant
- Area^{1}: 8.61 km^{2} (3.32 sq mi)
- Elevation: 320 m (1,050 ft)
- Highest elevation: 481 m (1,578 ft)
- Lowest elevation: 302 m (991 ft)
- Population (2023): 271
  - Density: 31.5/km^{2} (81.5/sq mi)
- Time zone: UTC+01:00 (CET)
  - Summer (DST): UTC+02:00 (CEST)
- INSEE/Postal code: 88366 /88170
- ^{1} French Land Register data, which excludes lakes, ponds, glaciers > 1 km^{2} (0.386 sq mi or 247 acres) and river estuaries.

Rainville (French pronunciation: [ʁɛ̃vil]) is a commune in the Vosges department in Grand Est in northeastern France.

Inhabitants are called Rainvillois.

== Geography ==
On its south side the commune is bordered by the Vraine, a small river that feeds into the Vair. On the western side it is bordered by the A31 autoroute: however, there is no direct road access to the autoroute from the village.

== See also ==
- Communes of the Vosges department
