= Aouze =

- Commune
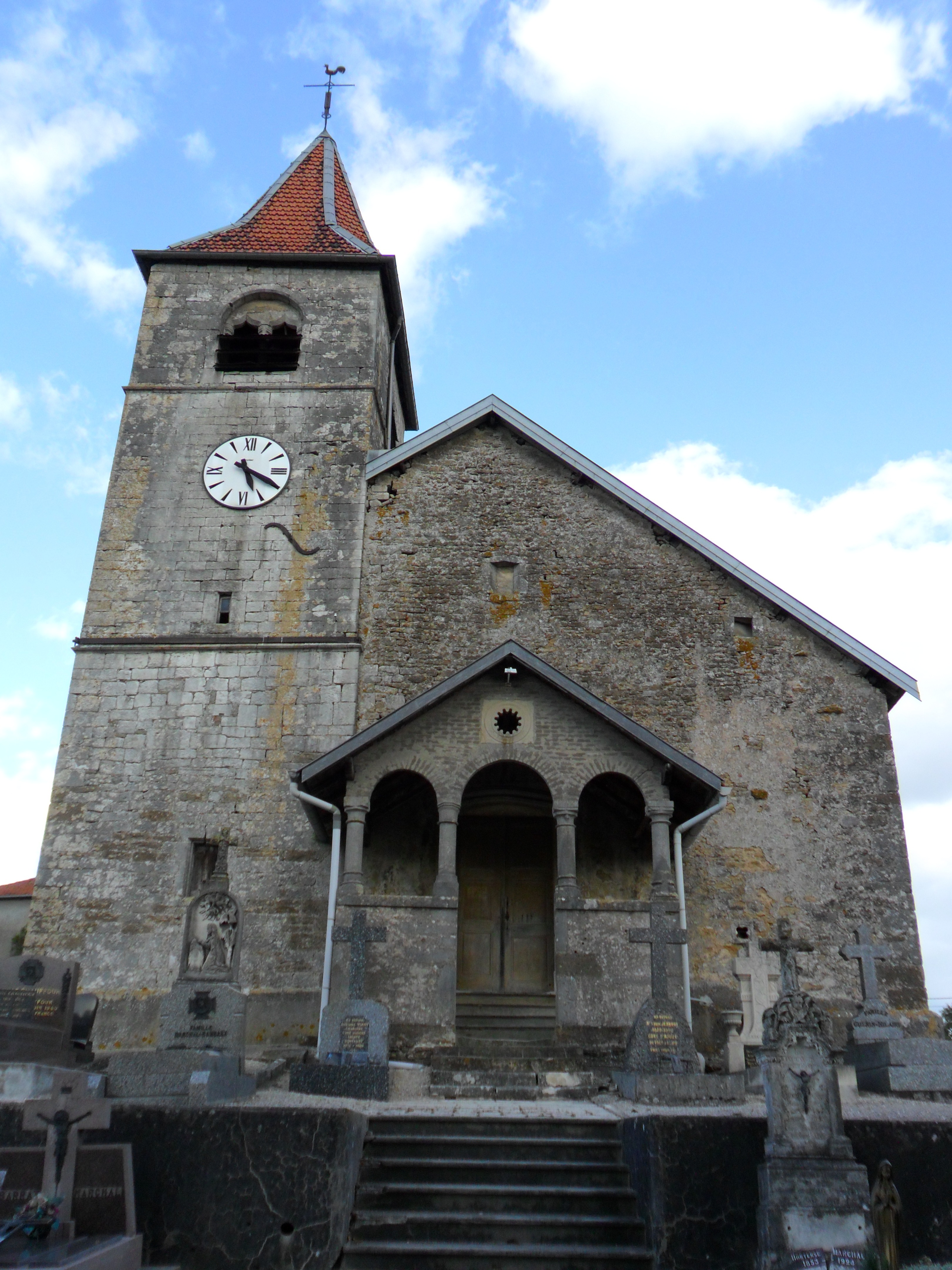
- The church in Aouze
- Location of Aouze
- Location within France Location within Grand Est
- Coordinates: 48°22′33″N 5°52′18″E
- Country: France
- Region: Grand Est
- Department: Vosges
- Arrondissement: Neufchâteau
- Canton: Mirecourt
- Intercommunality: CC l'Ouest Vosgien

Government
  - Mayor (2020–2026): Gilles Chognot
- Area^{1}: 11.21 km^{2} (4.33 sq mi)
- Elevation: 327 m (1,073 ft)
- Highest elevation: 479 m (1,572 ft)
- Lowest elevation: 310 m (1,020 ft)
- Population (2023): 190
  - Density: 17/km^{2} (44/sq mi)
- Time zone: UTC+01:00 (CET)
  - Summer (DST): UTC+02:00 (CEST)
- INSEE/Postal code: 88010 /88170
- ^{1} French Land Register data, which excludes lakes, ponds, glaciers > 1 km^{2} (0.386 sq mi or 247 acres) and river estuaries.

Aouze (French pronunciation: [auz]) is a commune in the Vosges department in Grand Est in northeastern France.

== See also ==
- Communes of the Vosges department
