= Darney-aux-Chênes =

- Commune
- Location of Darney-aux-Chênes
- Location within France Location within Grand Est
- Coordinates: 48°16′55″N 5°49′11″E
- Country: France
- Region: Grand Est
- Department: Vosges
- Arrondissement: Neufchâteau
- Canton: Mirecourt
- Intercommunality: CC l'Ouest Vosgien

Government
  - Mayor (2020–2026): Gérard Dubois
- Area^{1}: 2.44 km^{2} (0.94 sq mi)
- Highest elevation: 415 m (1,362 ft)
- Lowest elevation: 319 m (1,047 ft)
- Population (2023): 59
  - Density: 24/km^{2} (63/sq mi)
- Time zone: UTC+01:00 (CET)
  - Summer (DST): UTC+02:00 (CEST)
- INSEE/Postal code: 88125 /88170
- ^{1} French Land Register data, which excludes lakes, ponds, glaciers > 1 km^{2} (0.386 sq mi or 247 acres) and river estuaries.

Darney-aux-Chênes (French pronunciation: [daʁnɛ o ʃɛːn]) is a commune in the Vosges department in Grand Est in northeastern France.

== See also ==
- Communes of the Vosges department
