= Viocourt =

- Commune
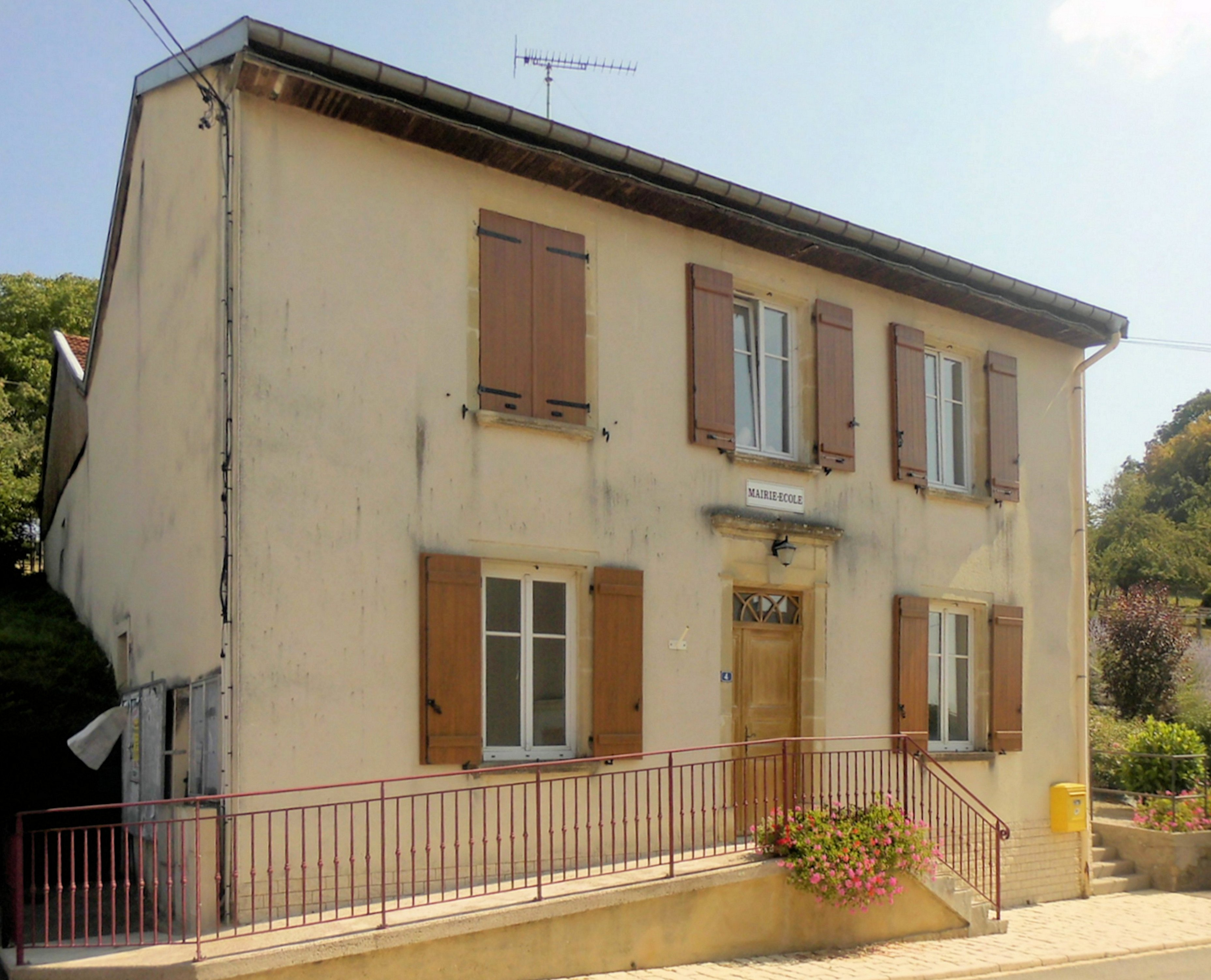
- The town hall in Viocourt

- Coat of arms
- Location of Viocourt
- Location within France Location within Grand Est
- Coordinates: 48°19′33″N 5°51′47″E
- Country: France
- Region: Grand Est
- Department: Vosges
- Arrondissement: Neufchâteau
- Canton: Mirecourt
- Intercommunality: CC l'Ouest Vosgien

Government
  - Mayor (2020–2026): Francis Robinet
- Area^{1}: 4.75 km^{2} (1.83 sq mi)
- Elevation: 310 m (1,020 ft)
- Highest elevation: 415 m (1,362 ft)
- Lowest elevation: 302 m (991 ft)
- Population (2023): 165
  - Density: 34.7/km^{2} (90.0/sq mi)
- Time zone: UTC+01:00 (CET)
  - Summer (DST): UTC+02:00 (CEST)
- INSEE/Postal code: 88514 /88170
- ^{1} French Land Register data, which excludes lakes, ponds, glaciers > 1 km^{2} (0.386 sq mi or 247 acres) and river estuaries.

Viocourt (French pronunciation: [vjɔkuʁ]) is a commune in the Vosges department in Grand Est in northeastern France.

== See also ==
- Communes of the Vosges department
