= Dolaincourt =

- Commune
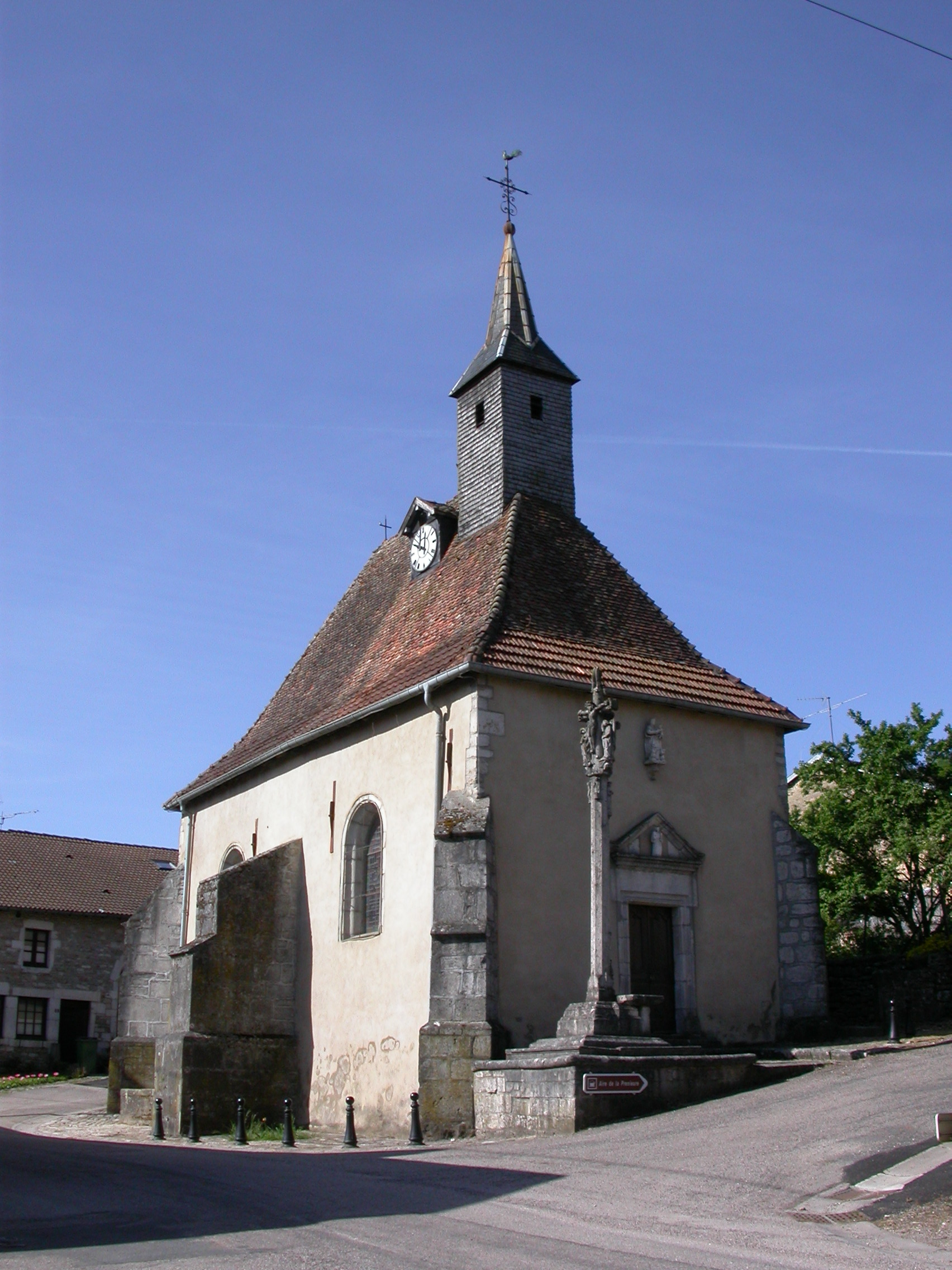
- The church in Dolaincourt

- Coat of arms
- Location of Dolaincourt
- Location within France Location within Grand Est
- Coordinates: 48°20′25″N 5°48′52″E
- Country: France
- Region: Grand Est
- Department: Vosges
- Arrondissement: Neufchâteau
- Canton: Mirecourt
- Intercommunality: CC l'Ouest Vosgien

Government
  - Mayor (2020–2026): Elisabeth Chane
- Area^{1}: 2.6 km^{2} (1.0 sq mi)
- Highest elevation: 455 m (1,493 ft)
- Lowest elevation: 319 m (1,047 ft)
- Population (2023): 85
  - Density: 33/km^{2} (85/sq mi)
- Time zone: UTC+01:00 (CET)
  - Summer (DST): UTC+02:00 (CEST)
- INSEE/Postal code: 88137 /88170
- ^{1} French Land Register data, which excludes lakes, ponds, glaciers > 1 km^{2} (0.386 sq mi or 247 acres) and river estuaries.

Dolaincourt (French pronunciation: [dɔlɛ̃kuʁ]) is a commune in the Vosges department in Grand Est in northeastern France.

== See also ==
- Communes of the Vosges department
