= Saint-Paul, Vosges =

Saint-Paul
- Commune
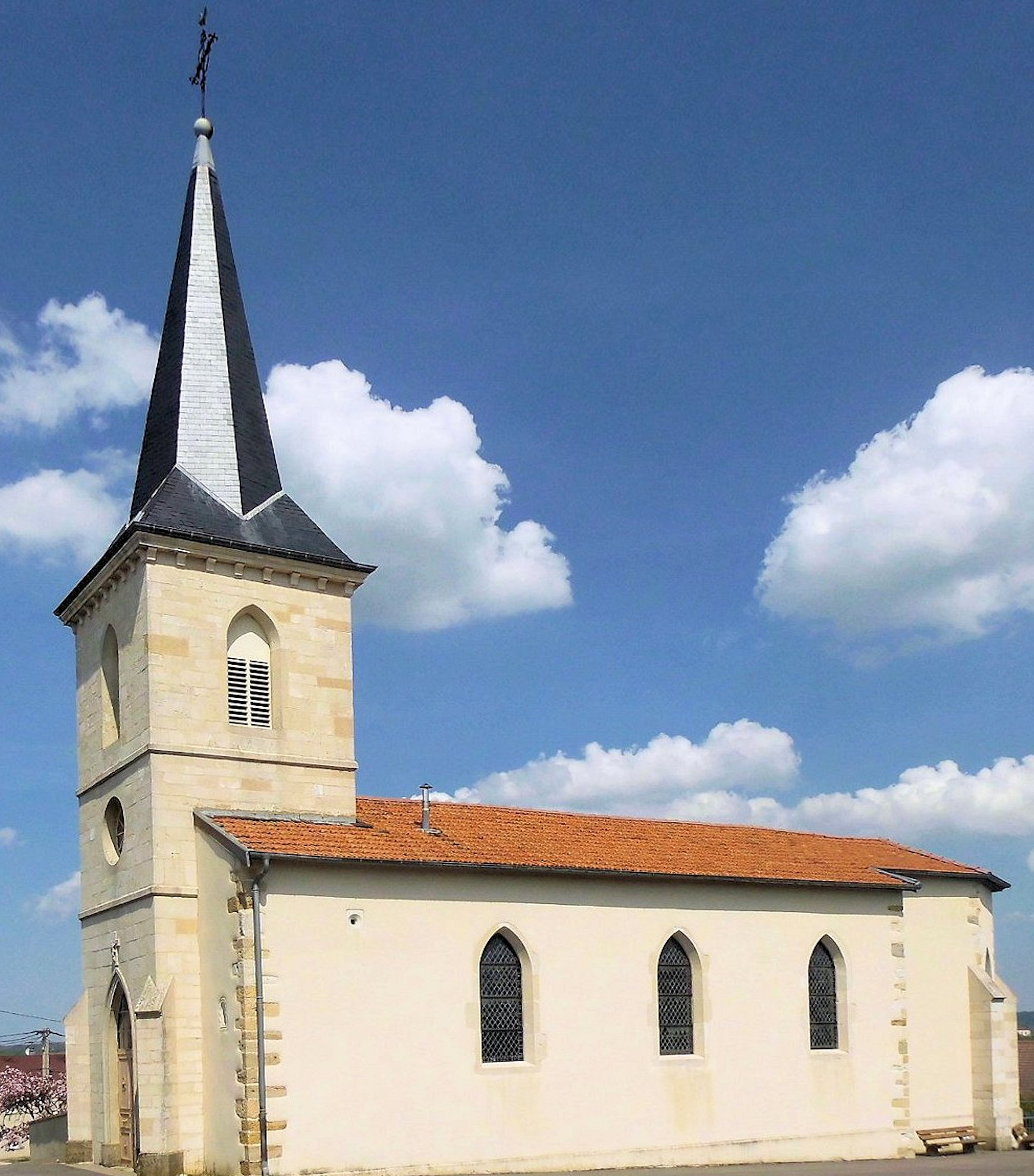
- The church in Saint-Paul
- Location of Saint-Paul
- Location within France Location within Grand Est
- Coordinates: 48°19′47″N 5°53′27″E
- Country: France
- Region: Grand Est
- Department: Vosges
- Arrondissement: Neufchâteau
- Canton: Mirecourt
- Intercommunality: CC l'Ouest Vosgien

Government
  - Mayor (2020–2026): Sandra Sommier
- Area^{1}: 4.9 km^{2} (1.9 sq mi)
- Highest elevation: 365 m (1,198 ft)
- Lowest elevation: 303 m (994 ft)
- Population (2023): 145
  - Density: 30/km^{2} (77/sq mi)
- Time zone: UTC+01:00 (CET)
  - Summer (DST): UTC+02:00 (CEST)
- INSEE/Postal code: 88431 /88170
- ^{1} French Land Register data, which excludes lakes, ponds, glaciers > 1 km^{2} (0.386 sq mi or 247 acres) and river estuaries.

Saint-Paul (French pronunciation: [sɛ̃ pɔl]) is a commune in the Vosges department in Grand Est in northeastern France.

== See also ==
- Communes of the Vosges department
