= Ollainville, Vosges =

Ollainville
- Commune
- Location of Ollainville
- Location within France Location within Grand Est
- Coordinates: 48°16′05″N 5°48′23″E
- Country: France
- Region: Grand Est
- Department: Vosges
- Arrondissement: Neufchâteau
- Canton: Mirecourt
- Intercommunality: CC Ouest Vosgien

Government
  - Mayor (2020–2026): Pauline Mire
- Area^{1}: 6.31 km^{2} (2.44 sq mi)
- Elevation: 340 m (1,120 ft)
- Highest elevation: 438 m (1,437 ft)
- Lowest elevation: 323 m (1,060 ft)
- Population (2023): 72
  - Density: 11/km^{2} (30/sq mi)
- Time zone: UTC+01:00 (CET)
  - Summer (DST): UTC+02:00 (CEST)
- INSEE/Postal code: 88336 /88170
- ^{1} French Land Register data, which excludes lakes, ponds, glaciers > 1 km^{2} (0.386 sq mi or 247 acres) and river estuaries.

Ollainville (French pronunciation: [ɔlɛ̃vil]) is a commune in the Vosges department in Grand Est in northeastern France.

Between 1962 and 1999, the registered population declined progressively by nearly 40%.

== See also ==
- Communes of the Vosges department
