= Vouxey =

- Commune
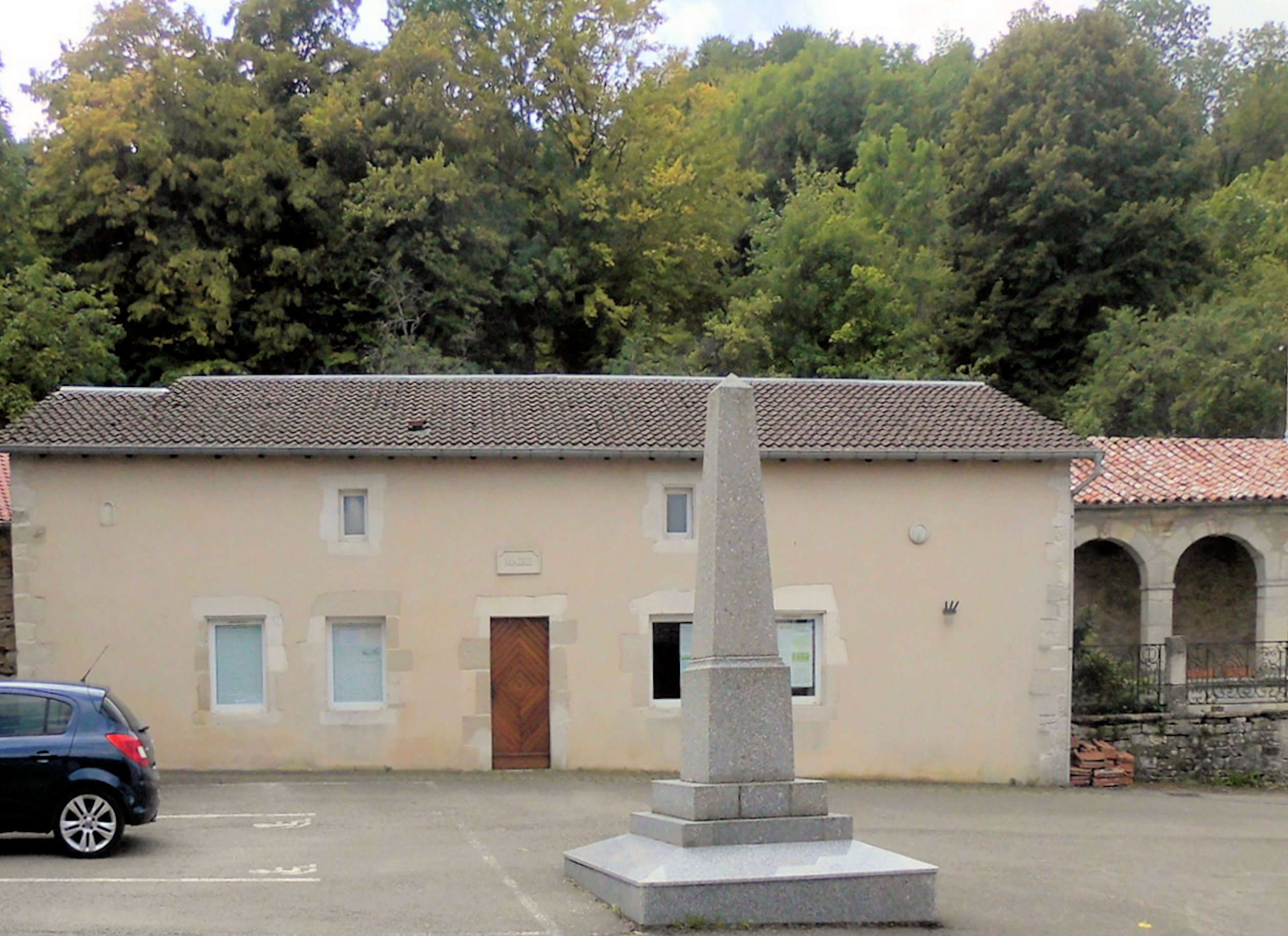
- The town hall in Vouxey

- Coat of arms
- Location of Vouxey
- Location within France Location within Grand Est
- Coordinates: 48°21′08″N 5°49′34″E
- Country: France
- Region: Grand Est
- Department: Vosges
- Arrondissement: Neufchâteau
- Canton: Mirecourt
- Intercommunality: Ouest Vosgien

Government
  - Mayor (2020–2026): Alain Bonneville
- Area^{1}: 23.28 km^{2} (8.99 sq mi)
- Elevation: 340 m (1,120 ft)
- Highest elevation: 453 m (1,486 ft)
- Lowest elevation: 297 m (974 ft)
- Population (2023): 172
  - Density: 7.39/km^{2} (19.1/sq mi)
- Time zone: UTC+01:00 (CET)
  - Summer (DST): UTC+02:00 (CEST)
- INSEE/Postal code: 88523 /88170
- ^{1} French Land Register data, which excludes lakes, ponds, glaciers > 1 km^{2} (0.386 sq mi or 247 acres) and river estuaries.

Vouxey (French pronunciation: [vuksɛ]) is a commune in the Vosges department in Grand Est in northeastern France.

== See also ==
- Communes of the Vosges department
