= Removille =

- Commune
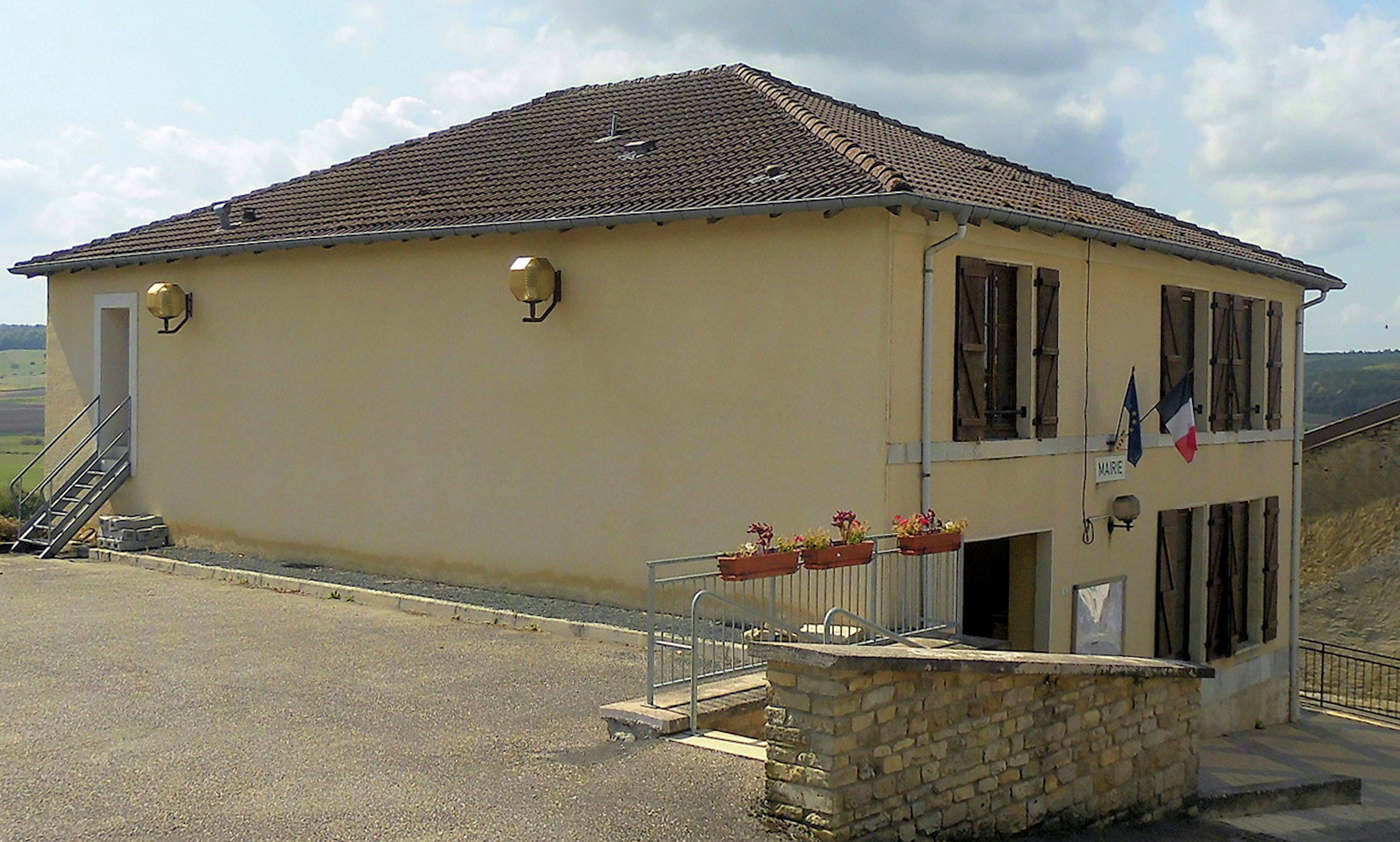
- The town hall in Removille

- Coat of arms
- Location of Removille
- Location within France Location within Grand Est
- Coordinates: 48°21′45″N 5°50′24″E
- Country: France
- Region: Grand Est
- Department: Vosges
- Arrondissement: Neufchâteau
- Canton: Mirecourt
- Intercommunality: CC l'Ouest Vosgien

Government
  - Mayor (2020–2026): Jacqueline Vignola
- Area^{1}: 7.55 km^{2} (2.92 sq mi)
- Highest elevation: 458 m (1,503 ft)
- Lowest elevation: 297 m (974 ft)
- Population (2023): 189
  - Density: 25.0/km^{2} (64.8/sq mi)
- Time zone: UTC+01:00 (CET)
  - Summer (DST): UTC+02:00 (CEST)
- INSEE/Postal code: 88387 /88170
- ^{1} French Land Register data, which excludes lakes, ponds, glaciers > 1 km^{2} (0.386 sq mi or 247 acres) and river estuaries.

Removille (French pronunciation: [ʁəmɔvil]) is a commune in the Vosges department in Grand Est in northeastern France.

== See also ==
- Communes of the Vosges department
