= Châtenois, Vosges =

Châtenois
- Commune
- Flag Coat of arms
- Location of Châtenois
- Location within France Location within Grand Est
- Coordinates: 48°18′13″N 5°49′59″E
- Country: France
- Region: Grand Est
- Department: Vosges
- Arrondissement: Neufchâteau
- Canton: Mirecourt
- Intercommunality: CC l'Ouest Vosgien

Government
  - Mayor (2020–2026): Guy Sauvage
- Area^{1}: 17.57 km^{2} (6.78 sq mi)
- Elevation: 324 m (1,063 ft)
- Highest elevation: 484 m (1,588 ft)
- Lowest elevation: 303 m (994 ft)
- Population (2023): 1,723
  - Density: 98.06/km^{2} (254.0/sq mi)
- Time zone: UTC+01:00 (CET)
  - Summer (DST): UTC+02:00 (CEST)
- INSEE/Postal code: 88095 /88170
- ^{1} French Land Register data, which excludes lakes, ponds, glaciers > 1 km^{2} (0.386 sq mi or 247 acres) and river estuaries.

Châtenois (French pronunciation: [ʃatnwa]) is a commune in the Vosges department in Grand Est in northeastern France.

== See also ==
- Communes of the Vosges department
