= Communauté de communes du Secteur de Dompaire =

The Communauté de communes du Secteur de Dompaire (before 2009: Communauté de communes du Pays d'Entre Madon et Moselle) is a former administrative association of communes in the Vosges département of eastern France and in the region of Lorraine. It was created in December 2000. It was merged into the new Communauté de communes de Mirecourt Dompaire in January 2017. Its seat was in Dompaire.

== Composition ==
The Communauté de communes comprised the following communes:

- Les Ableuvenettes
- Ahéville
- Bainville-aux-Saules
- Bazegney
- Begnécourt
- Bettegney-Saint-Brice
- Bocquegney
- Bouxières-aux-Bois
- Bouzemont
- Charmois-l'Orgueilleux
- Circourt
- Damas-et-Bettegney
- Derbamont
- Dommartin-aux-Bois
- Dompaire
- Gelvécourt-et-Adompt
- Gorhey
- Gugney-aux-Aulx
- Hagécourt
- Harol
- Hennecourt
- Jorxey
- Légéville-et-Bonfays
- Madegney
- Madonne-et-Lamerey
- Maroncourt
- Pierrefitte
- Racécourt
- Regney
- Saint-Vallier
- Vaubexy
- Velotte-et-Tatignécourt
- Ville-sur-Illon
