= Canton of Dompaire =

Coordinates: 48°13′14″N 6°12′25″E

Dompaire
- Former canton
- Interactive map of Dompaire
- Country: France
- Region: Grand Est
- Department: Vosges
- No. of communes: {{{nbcomm}}}
- Disbanded: 2015
- Area: 223.00 km^{2} (86.10 sq mi)
- Population (2012): 5,981
  - Density: 26.82/km^{2} (69.47/sq mi)

The Canton of Dompaire is a French former administrative grouping of communes in the Vosges département of eastern France and in the region of Lorraine. It was disbanded following the French canton reorganisation which came into effect in March 2015. It had 5,981 inhabitants (2012).

== Composition ==
The Canton of Dompaire comprised the following 30 communes:

- Les Ableuvenettes
- Ahéville
- Bainville-aux-Saules
- Bazegney
- Begnécourt
- Bettegney-Saint-Brice
- Bocquegney
- Bouxières-aux-Bois
- Bouzemont
- Circourt
- Damas-et-Bettegney
- Derbamont
- Dompaire
- Gelvécourt-et-Adompt
- Gorhey
- Gugney-aux-Aulx
- Hagécourt
- Harol
- Hennecourt
- Jorxey
- Légéville-et-Bonfays
- Madegney
- Madonne-et-Lamerey
- Maroncourt
- Racécourt
- Regney
- Saint-Vallier
- Vaubexy
- Velotte-et-Tatignécourt
- Ville-sur-Illon

== History ==
The canton remains overwhelmingly rural, but in recent years has welcomed an increasing number of incomers drawn by the employment opportunities in the Épinal agglomeration. Between 1990 and 1999 the registered population grew by a net figure of 149 people, representing an increase of 2.9%.
