= Association of Mirecourt Country communes =

The Association of Mirecourt Country communes (French: Communauté de communes du Pays de Mirecourt) is a former administrative association of communes in the Vosges département of eastern France and in the region of Lorraine. It was created in January 2014 and had its administrative offices at Juvaincourt. It was merged into the new Communauté de communes de Mirecourt Dompaire in January 2017.

The Communauté de communes du Pays de Mirecourt was first created in 1997. In January 2014 it absorbed the former Communauté de communes du Xaintois and 8 other communes, forming a new association with the same name.

== Composition ==
The Communauté de communes comprised the following communes:

1. Ambacourt
2. Baudricourt
3. Biécourt
4. Blémerey
5. Boulaincourt
6. Chauffecourt
7. Chef-Haut
8. Dombasle-en-Xaintois
9. Domvallier
10. Frenelle-la-Grande
11. Frenelle-la-Petite
12. Hymont
13. Juvaincourt
14. Madecourt
15. Mattaincourt
16. Mazirot
17. Mirecourt
18. Oëlleville
19. Poussay
20. Puzieux
21. Ramecourt
22. Remicourt
23. Repel
24. Rouvres-en-Xaintois
25. Saint-Prancher
26. Thiraucourt
27. Totainville
28. Valleroy-aux-Saules
29. Villers
30. Vroville
