= Communes of the Vosges department =

The following is a list of the 506 communes of the Vosges department of France.

== Intercommunalities ==
The communes cooperate in the following intercommunalities (as of 2025):

- Communauté d'agglomération d'Épinal
- Communauté d'agglomération de Saint-Dié-des-Vosges (partly)
- Communauté de communes des Ballons des Hautes-Vosges
- Communauté de communes Bruyères - Vallons des Vosges
- Communauté de communes Gérardmer Hautes Vosges
- Communauté de communes des Hautes Vosges
- Communauté de communes de Mirecourt Dompaire
- Communauté de communes de l'Ouest Vosgien (partly)
- Communauté de communes du Pays de Colombey et du Sud Toulois (partly)
- Communauté de communes de la Porte des Vosges Méridionales
- Communauté de communes de la Région de Rambervillers
- Communauté de communes Terre d'eau
- Communauté de communes des Vosges côté Sud-Ouest

== List of communes ==
INSEE code	Postal code	Commune
88001	88270	Les Ableuvenettes
88002	88500	Ahéville
88003	88140	Aingeville
88004	88320	Ainvelle
88005	88110	Allarmont
88006	88500	Ambacourt
88007	88410	Ameuvelle
88008	88700	Anglemont
88009	88650	Anould
88010	88170	Aouze
88011	88380	Arches
88012	88380	Archettes
88013	88170	Aroffe
88014	88430	Arrentès-de-Corcieux
88015	88300	Attignéville
88016	88260	Attigny
88017	88300	Aulnois
88019	88300	Autigny-la-Tour
88020	88300	Autreville
88021	88700	Autrey
88022	88140	Auzainvilliers
88023	88500	Avillers
88024	88130	Avrainville
88025	88630	Avranville
88026	88600	Aydoilles
88027	88330	Badménil-aux-Bois
88028	88460	La Baffe
88030	88270	Bainville-aux-Saules
88031	88170	Balléville
88032	88520	Ban-de-Laveline
88033	88210	Ban-de-Sapt
88106	88230	Ban-sur-Meurthe-Clefcy
88035	88640	Barbey-Seroux
88036	88300	Barville
88037	88120	Basse-sur-le-Rupt
88038	88130	Battexey
88039	88500	Baudricourt
88040	88150	Bayecourt
88041	88270	Bazegney
88042	88700	Bazien
88043	88500	Bazoilles-et-Ménil
88044	88300	Bazoilles-sur-Meuse
88045	88300	Beaufremont
88046	88600	Beauménil
88047	88270	Begnécourt
88048	88370	Bellefontaine
88049	88260	Belmont-lès-Darney
88050	88600	Belmont-sur-Buttant
88051	88800	Belmont-sur-Vair
88052	88260	Belrupt
88053	88210	Belval
88054	88520	Bertrimoutier
88055	88450	Bettegney-Saint-Brice
88056	88500	Bettoncourt
88057	88490	Le Beulay
88058	88170	Biécourt
88059	88430	Biffontaine
88060	88500	Blémerey
88061	88410	Bleurville
88062	88320	Blevaincourt
88063	88270	Bocquegney
88064	88600	Bois-de-Champ
88065	88260	Bonvillet
88066	88500	Boulaincourt
88068	88470	La Bourgonce
88069	88270	Bouxières-aux-Bois
88070	88130	Bouxurulles
88071	88270	Bouzemont
88073	88130	Brantigny
88074	88350	Brechainville
88075	88250	La Bresse
88076	88600	Brouvelieures
88077	88700	Brû
88078	88600	Bruyères
88079	88140	Bulgnéville
88080	88700	Bult
88081	88540	Bussang
88465	88150	Thaon-les-Vosges
88082	88110	Celles-sur-Plaine
88083	88300	Certilleux
88084	88130	Chamagne
88085	88640	Champdray
88086	88600	Champ-le-Duc
88087	88000	Chantraine
88088	88240	La Chapelle-aux-Bois
88089	88600	La Chapelle-devant-Bruyères
88090	88130	Charmes
88091	88460	Charmois-devant-Bruyères
88092	88270	Charmois-l'Orgueilleux
88093	88210	Châtas
88094	88330	Châtel-sur-Moselle
88095	88170	Châtenois
88096	88410	Châtillon-sur-Saône
88097	88500	Chauffecourt
88098	88390	Chaumousey
88099	88150	Chavelot
88100	88500	Chef-Haut
88101	88460	Cheniménil
88102	88630	Chermisey
88103	88270	Circourt
88104	88300	Circourt-sur-Mouzon
88105	88410	Claudon
88107	88630	Clérey-la-Côte
88108	88240	Le Clerjus
88109	88120	Cleurie
88110	88700	Clézentaine
88111	88100	Coinches
88113	88490	Combrimont
88114	88140	Contrexéville
88115	88430	Corcieux
88116	88310	Cornimont
88117	88170	Courcelles-sous-Châtenois
88118	88630	Coussey
88119	88140	Crainvilliers
88120	88520	La Croix-aux-Mines
88121	88330	Damas-aux-Bois
88122	88270	Damas-et-Bettegney
88123	88320	Damblain
88124	88260	Darney
88125	88170	Darney-aux-Chênes
88126	88390	Darnieulles
88127	88700	Deinvillers
88128	88210	Denipaire
88129	88270	Derbamont
88130	88600	Destord
88131	88600	Deycimont
88132	88000	Deyvillers
88133	88000	Dignonville
88134	88000	Dinozé
88135	88460	Docelles
88136	88000	Dogneville
88137	88170	Dolaincourt
88138	88260	Dombasle-devant-Darney
88139	88500	Dombasle-en-Xaintois
88140	88140	Dombrot-le-Sec
88141	88170	Dombrot-sur-Vair
88144	88500	Domèvre-sous-Montfort
88142	88390	Domèvre-sur-Avière
88143	88330	Domèvre-sur-Durbion
88145	88600	Domfaing
88146	88800	Domjulien
88147	88390	Dommartin-aux-Bois
88148	88200	Dommartin-lès-Remiremont
88149	88260	Dommartin-lès-Vallois
88150	88170	Dommartin-sur-Vraine
88151	88270	Dompaire
88152	88600	Dompierre
88153	88700	Domptail
88154	88630	Domrémy-la-Pucelle
88155	88500	Domvallier
88156	88700	Doncières
88157	88220	Dounoux
88158	88510	Éloyes
88159	88650	Entre-deux-Eaux
88160	88000	Épinal
88161	88260	Escles
88162	88260	Esley
88163	88130	Essegney
88164	88500	Estrennes
88165	88480	Étival-Clairefontaine
88166	88450	Évaux-et-Ménil
88167	88460	Faucompierre
88168	88700	Fauconcourt
88169	88600	Fays
88170	88360	Ferdrupt
88171	88410	Fignévelle
88172	88600	Fiménil
88173	88130	Florémont
88174	88390	Fomerey
88175	88600	Fontenay
88176	88240	Fontenoy-le-Château
88177	88530	La Forge
88178	88390	Les Forges
88179	88320	Fouchécourt
88180	88320	Frain
88181	88230	Fraize
88182	88490	Frapelle
88183	88630	Frebécourt
88184	88600	Fremifontaine
88185	88500	Frenelle-la-Grande
88186	88500	Frenelle-la-Petite
88187	88270	Frénois
88188	88160	Fresse-sur-Moselle
88189	88350	Fréville
88190	88440	Frizon
88192	88270	Gelvécourt-et-Adompt
88193	88520	Gemaingoutte
88194	88170	Gemmelaincourt
88195	88140	Gendreville
88196	88400	Gérardmer
88197	88120	Gerbamont
88198	88430	Gerbépal
88199	88320	Gignéville
88200	88390	Gigney
88201	88390	Girancourt
88202	88500	Gircourt-lès-Viéville
88203	88600	Girecourt-sur-Durbion
88205	88340	Girmont-Val-d'Ajol
88206	88170	Gironcourt-sur-Vraine
88208	88410	Godoncourt
88209	88190	Golbey
88210	88270	Gorhey
88212	88350	Grand
88213	88490	La Grande-Fosse
88215	88210	Grandrupt
88214	88240	Grandrupt-de-Bains
88216	88600	Grandvillers
88218	88640	Granges-Aumontzey
88219	88630	Greux
88220	88410	Grignoncourt
88221	88240	Gruey-lès-Surance
88222	88600	Gugnécourt
88223	88450	Gugney-aux-Aulx
88224	88330	Hadigny-les-Verrières
88225	88220	Hadol
88226	88270	Hagécourt
88227	88300	Hagnéville-et-Roncourt
88228	88330	Haillainville
88229	88300	Harchéchamp
88230	88700	Hardancourt
88231	88800	Haréville
88232	88300	Harmonville
88233	88270	Harol
88236	88240	La Haye
88237	88270	Hennecourt
88238	88260	Hennezel
88239	88130	Hergugney
88240	88600	Herpelmont
88241	88170	Houécourt
88242	88300	Houéville
88243	88700	Housseras
88244	88430	La Houssière
88245	88210	Hurbache
88246	88500	Hymont
88247	88150	Igney
88248	88320	Isches
88249	88300	Jainvillotte
88250	88550	Jarménil
88251	88700	Jeanménil
88252	88260	Jésonville
88253	88000	Jeuxey
88254	88500	Jorxey
88255	88630	Jubainville
88256	88640	Jussarupt
88257	88500	Juvaincourt
88258	88320	Lamarche
88259	88300	Landaville
88260	88130	Langley
88261	88600	Laval-sur-Vologne
88262	88600	Laveline-devant-Bruyères
88263	88640	Laveline-du-Houx
88264	88270	Légéville-et-Bonfays
88265	88300	Lemmecourt

INSEE code	Postal code	Commune
88266	88600	Lépanges-sur-Vologne
88267	88260	Lerrain
88268	88490	Lesseux
88269	88400	Liézey
88270	88350	Liffol-le-Grand
88271	88800	Lignéville
88272	88410	Lironcourt
88273	88000	Longchamp
88274	88170	Longchamp-sous-Châtenois
88275	88490	Lubine
88276	88490	Lusse
88277	88110	Luvigny
88278	88170	Maconcourt
88279	88270	Madecourt
88280	88450	Madegney
88281	88270	Madonne-et-Lamerey
88283	88140	Malaincourt
88284	88650	Mandray
88285	88800	Mandres-sur-Vair
88286	88130	Marainville-sur-Madon
88287	88320	Marey
88288	88270	Maroncourt
88289	88320	Martigny-les-Bains
88290	88300	Martigny-les-Gerbonvaux
88291	88410	Martinvelle
88292	88500	Mattaincourt
88293	88630	Maxey-sur-Meuse
88294	88150	Mazeley
88295	88500	Mazirot
88296	88140	Médonville
88297	88600	Méménil
88298	88700	Ménarmont
88302	88160	Le Ménil
88300	88210	Ménil-de-Senones
88299	88500	Ménil-en-Xaintois
88301	88700	Ménil-sur-Belvitte
88303	88630	Midrevaux
88304	88500	Mirecourt
88305	88630	Moncel-sur-Vair
88306	88210	Le Mont
88309	88800	Monthureux-le-Sec
88310	88410	Monthureux-sur-Saône
88307	88320	Mont-lès-Lamarche
88308	88300	Mont-lès-Neufchâteau
88311	88240	Montmotier
88312	88170	Morelmaison
88313	88330	Moriville
88314	88320	Morizécourt
88315	88600	Mortagne
88316	88140	Morville
88317	88210	Moussey
88318	88700	Moyemont
88319	88420	Moyenmoutier
88320	88100	Nayemont-les-Fosses
88321	88300	Neufchâteau
88322	88600	La Neuveville-devant-Lépanges
88324	88170	La Neuveville-sous-Châtenois
88325	88800	La Neuveville-sous-Montfort
88326	88100	Neuvillers-sur-Fave
88327	88440	Nomexy
88328	88470	Nompatelize
88330	88260	Nonville
88331	88600	Nonzeville
88332	88800	Norroy
88333	88700	Nossoncourt
88334	88500	Oëlleville
88335	88500	Offroicourt
88336	88170	Ollainville
88338	88700	Ortoncourt
88340	88700	Padoux
88341	88100	Pair-et-Grandrupt
88342	88330	Pallegney
88343	88800	Parey-sous-Montfort
88344	88350	Pargny-sous-Mureau
88345	88490	La Petite-Fosse
88346	88210	La Petite-Raon
88347	88270	Pierrefitte
88348	88600	Pierrepont-sur-l'Arentèle
88349	88230	Plainfaing
88350	88170	Pleuvezain
88351	88370	Plombières-les-Bains
88352	88300	Pompierre
88353	88260	Pont-lès-Bonfays
88354	88500	Pont-sur-Madon
88355	88330	Portieux
88356	88600	Les Poulières
88357	88500	Poussay
88358	88550	Pouxeux
88359	88600	Prey
88361	88490	Provenchères-et-Colroy
88360	88260	Provenchères-lès-Darney
88362	88210	Le Puid
88363	88630	Punerot
88364	88500	Puzieux
88365	88270	Racécourt
88366	88170	Rainville
88367	88700	Rambervillers
88368	88500	Ramecourt
88369	88160	Ramonchamp
88370	88270	Rancourt
88371	88220	Raon-aux-Bois
88372	88110	Raon-l'Étape
88373	88110	Raon-sur-Plaine
88374	88130	Rapey
88375	88520	Raves
88376	88300	Rebeuville
88377	88410	Regnévelle
88378	88450	Regney
88379	88330	Rehaincourt
88380	88640	Rehaupal
88381	88260	Relanges
88382	88500	Remicourt
88383	88200	Remiremont
88386	88100	Remomeix
88385	88800	Remoncourt
88387	88170	Removille
88388	88390	Renauvoid
88389	88500	Repel
88390	88320	Robécourt
88391	88120	Rochesson
88394	88320	Romain-aux-Bois
88395	88700	Romont
88398	88600	Les Rouges-Eaux
88399	88460	Le Roulier
88400	88500	Rouvres-en-Xaintois
88401	88170	Rouvres-la-Chétive
88402	88700	Roville-aux-Chênes
88403	88500	Rozerotte
88404	88320	Rozières-sur-Mouzon
88406	88130	Rugney
88407	88630	Ruppes
88408	88360	Rupt-sur-Moselle
88409	88120	Saint-Amé
88411	88260	Saint-Baslemont
88412	88700	Saint-Benoît-la-Chipotte
88413	88100	Saint-Dié-des-Vosges
88410	88700	Sainte-Barbe
88418	88700	Sainte-Hélène
88424	88100	Sainte-Marguerite
88415	88200	Saint-Étienne-lès-Remiremont
88416	88700	Saint-Genest
88417	88700	Saint-Gorgon
88419	88210	Saint-Jean-d'Ormont
88421	88410	Saint-Julien
88423	88650	Saint-Léonard
88425	88700	Saint-Maurice-sur-Mortagne
88426	88560	Saint-Maurice-sur-Moselle
88427	88170	Saint-Menge
88428	88470	Saint-Michel-sur-Meurthe
88429	88200	Saint-Nabord
88430	88140	Saint-Ouen-lès-Parey
88431	88170	Saint-Paul
88432	88700	Saint-Pierremont
88433	88500	Saint-Prancher
88434	88800	Saint-Remimont
88435	88480	Saint-Remy
88436	88210	Saint-Stail
88437	88270	Saint-Vallier
88438	88470	La Salle
88439	88390	Sanchey
88440	88170	Sandaucourt
88441	88260	Sans-Vallois
88442	88120	Sapois
88443	88300	Sartes
88444	88210	Le Saulcy
88445	88580	Saulcy-sur-Meurthe
88446	88140	Saulxures-lès-Bulgnéville
88447	88290	Saulxures-sur-Moselotte
88448	88140	Sauville
88449	88130	Savigny
88450	88320	Senaide
88451	88210	Senones
88452	88260	Senonges
88453	88630	Seraumont
88454	88600	Sercœur
88455	88320	Serécourt
88456	88320	Serocourt
88457	88630	Sionne
88458	88130	Socourt
88459	88170	Soncourt
88460	88630	Soulosse-sous-Saint-Élophe
88461	88140	Suriauville
88462	88120	Le Syndicat
88463	88100	Taintrux
88464	88460	Tendon
88466	88800	They-sous-Montfort
88467	88290	Thiéfosse
88468	88160	Le Thillot
88469	88500	Thiraucourt
88470	88530	Le Tholy
88471	88410	Les Thons
88472	88260	Thuillières
88473	88320	Tignécourt
88474	88300	Tilleux
88475	88320	Tollaincourt
88476	88500	Totainville
88477	88350	Trampot
88478	88300	Tranqueville-Graux
88479	88240	Trémonzey
88480	88130	Ubexy
88481	88220	Uriménil
88482	88140	Urville
88483	88390	Uxegney
88484	88220	Uzemain
88485	88140	La Vacheresse-et-la-Rouillie
88486	88120	Vagney
88487	88340	Le Val-d'Ajol
88488	88270	Valfroicourt
88489	88270	Valleroy-aux-Saules
88490	88800	Valleroy-le-Sec
88491	88260	Les Vallois
88492	88230	Le Valtin
88493	88450	Varmonzey
88494	88500	Vaubexy
88495	88000	Vaudéville
88496	88140	Vaudoncourt
88497	88330	Vaxoncourt
88498	88200	Vecoux
88499	88270	Velotte-et-Tatignécourt
88500	88310	Ventron
88501	88210	Le Vermont
88502	88600	Vervezelle
88503	88110	Vexaincourt
88504	88170	Vicherey
88505	88430	Vienville
88506	88210	Vieux-Moulin
88507	88500	Villers
88508	88270	Ville-sur-Illon
88509	88150	Villoncourt
88510	88320	Villotte
88511	88350	Villouxel
88512	88600	Viménil
88513	88450	Vincey
88514	88170	Viocourt
88515	88260	Vioménil
88516	88800	Vittel
88517	88260	Viviers-le-Gras
88518	88500	Viviers-lès-Offroicourt
88029	88240	La Vôge-les-Bains
88519	88470	La Voivre
88520	88240	Les Voivres
88521	88700	Vomécourt
88522	88500	Vomécourt-sur-Madon
88523	88170	Vouxey
88524	88140	Vrécourt
88525	88500	Vroville
88526	88520	Wisembach
88527	88700	Xaffévillers
88528	88460	Xamontarupt
88529	88130	Xaronval
88530	88220	Xertigny
88531	88400	Xonrupt-Longemer
88532	88330	Zincourt
