= Crainvilliers =

- Commune
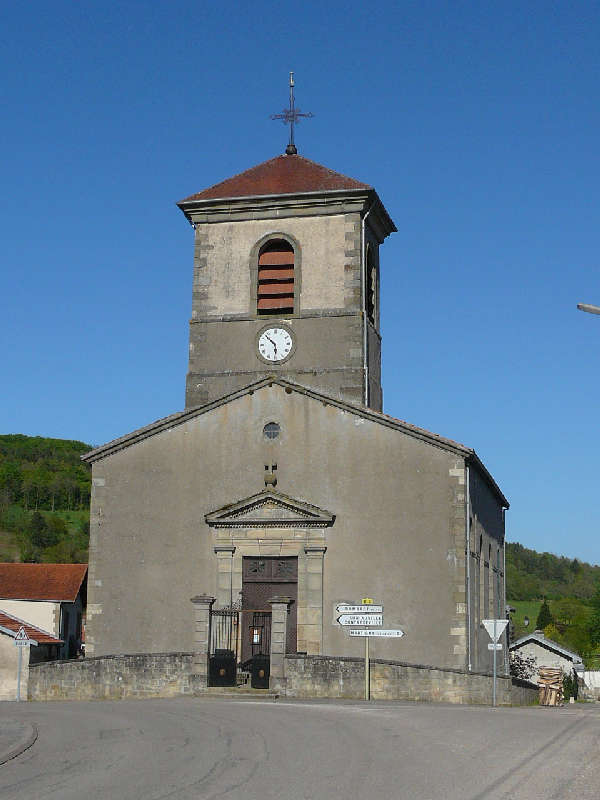
- The church in Crainvilliers
- Location of Crainvilliers
- Location within France Location within Grand Est
- Coordinates: 48°08′50″N 5°50′00″E
- Country: France
- Region: Grand Est
- Department: Vosges
- Arrondissement: Neufchâteau
- Canton: Vittel
- Intercommunality: CC Terre d'eau

Government
  - Mayor (2020–2026): Bernard Albert
- Area^{1}: 10.45 km^{2} (4.03 sq mi)
- Elevation: 355 m (1,165 ft)
- Highest elevation: 480 m (1,570 ft)
- Lowest elevation: 343 m (1,125 ft)
- Population (2023): 182
  - Density: 17.4/km^{2} (45.1/sq mi)
- Time zone: UTC+01:00 (CET)
  - Summer (DST): UTC+02:00 (CEST)
- INSEE/Postal code: 88119 /88140
- ^{1} French Land Register data, which excludes lakes, ponds, glaciers > 1 km^{2} (0.386 sq mi or 247 acres) and river estuaries.

Crainvilliers (French pronunciation: [kʁɛ̃vilje]) is a commune in the Vosges department in Grand Est in northeastern France.

== See also ==
- Communes of the Vosges department
