= Valfroicourt =

- Commune
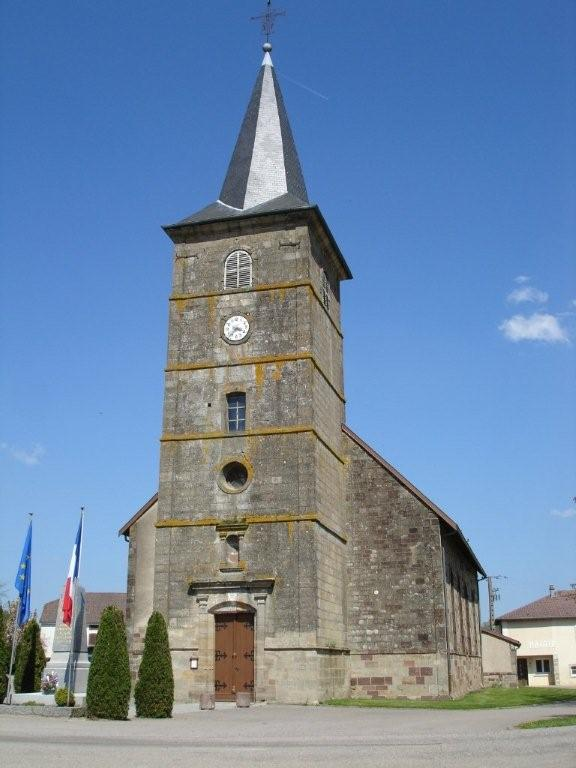
- The church in Valfroicourt
- Location of Valfroicourt
- Location within France Location within Grand Est
- Coordinates: 48°11′55″N 6°05′44″E
- Country: France
- Region: Grand Est
- Department: Vosges
- Arrondissement: Neufchâteau
- Canton: Vittel
- Intercommunality: CC Terre d'eau

Government
  - Mayor (2020–2026): Eliane Deloy
- Area^{1}: 13.8 km^{2} (5.3 sq mi)
- Elevation: 310 m (1,020 ft)
- Highest elevation: 419 m (1,375 ft)
- Lowest elevation: 295 m (968 ft)
- Population (2023): 228
  - Density: 16.5/km^{2} (42.8/sq mi)
- Time zone: UTC+01:00 (CET)
  - Summer (DST): UTC+02:00 (CEST)
- INSEE/Postal code: 88488 /88270
- ^{1} French Land Register data, which excludes lakes, ponds, glaciers > 1 km^{2} (0.386 sq mi or 247 acres) and river estuaries.

Valfroicourt (French pronunciation: [valfʁwakuʁ]) is a commune in the Vosges department in Grand Est in northeastern France.

== See also ==
- Communes of the Vosges department
