= Rancourt, Vosges =

Rancourt
- Commune
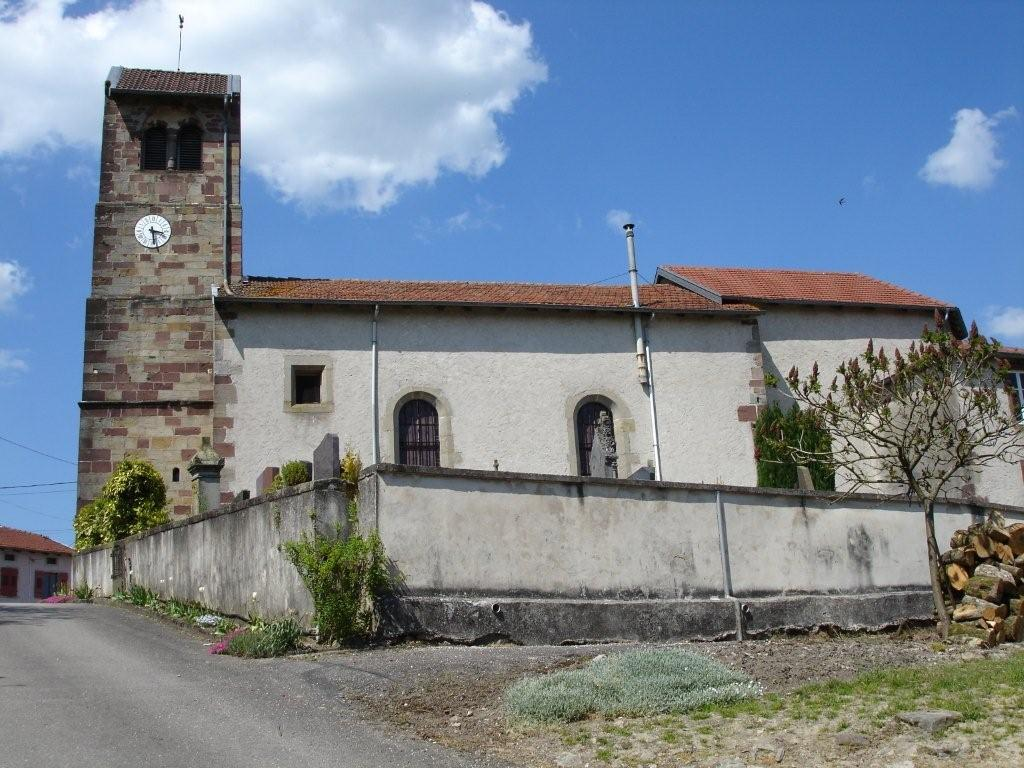
- The church in Rancourt
- Location of Rancourt
- Location within France Location within Grand Est
- Coordinates: 48°13′18″N 6°06′33″E
- Country: France
- Region: Grand Est
- Department: Vosges
- Arrondissement: Neufchâteau
- Canton: Vittel
- Intercommunality: CC Mirecourt Dompaire

Government
  - Mayor (2020–2026): Alain Clochey
- Area^{1}: 5.57 km^{2} (2.15 sq mi)
- Elevation: 356 m (1,168 ft)
- Highest elevation: 424 m (1,391 ft)
- Lowest elevation: 304 m (997 ft)
- Population (2023): 75
  - Density: 13/km^{2} (35/sq mi)
- Time zone: UTC+01:00 (CET)
  - Summer (DST): UTC+02:00 (CEST)
- INSEE/Postal code: 88370 /88270
- ^{1} French Land Register data, which excludes lakes, ponds, glaciers > 1 km^{2} (0.386 sq mi or 247 acres) and river estuaries.

Rancourt (French pronunciation: [ʁɑ̃kuʁ]) is a commune in the Vosges department in Grand Est in northeastern France.

== See also ==
- Communes of the Vosges department
