= Bazoilles-et-Ménil =

- Commune
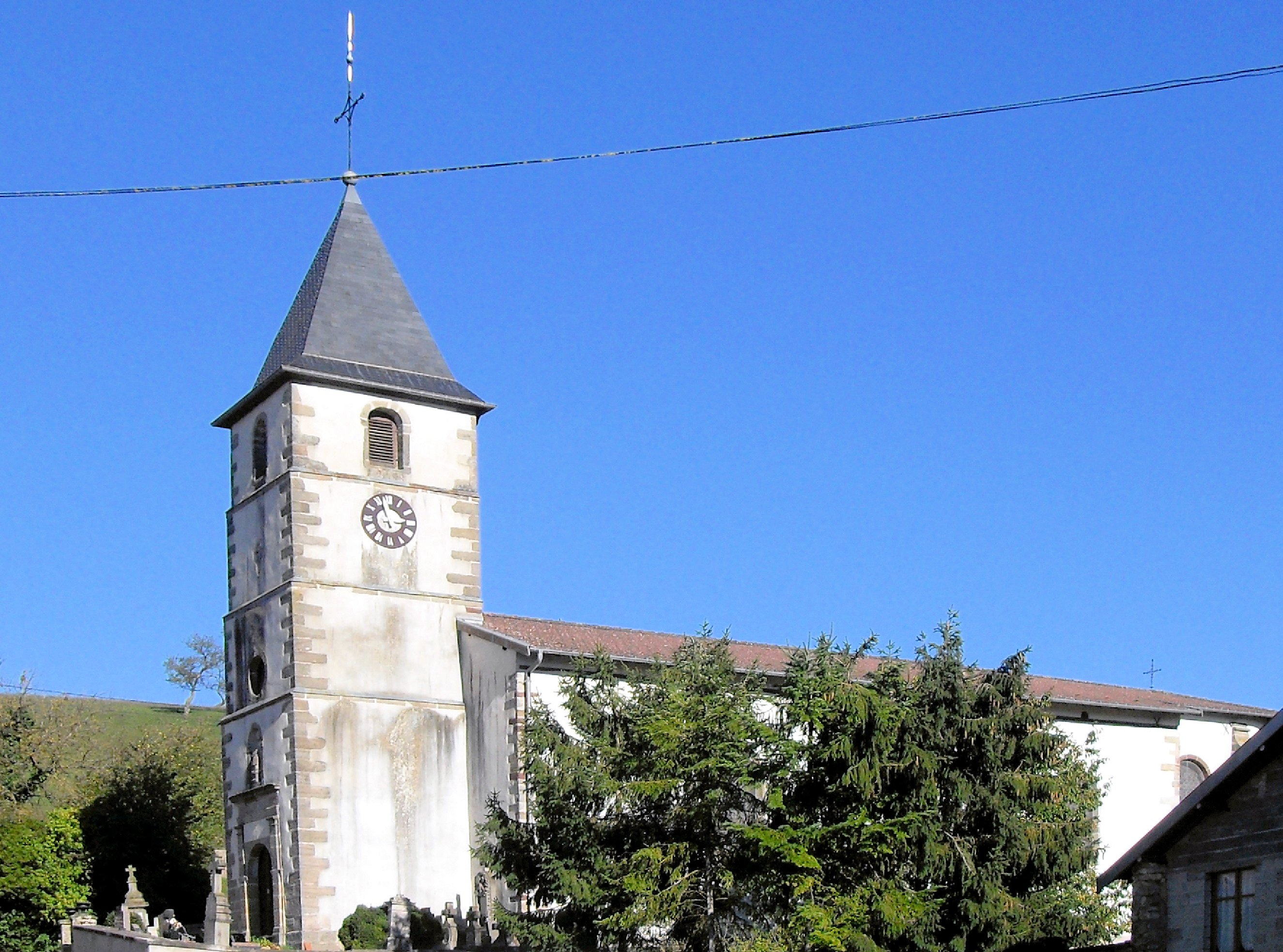
- The church in Bazoilles-et-Ménil
- Location of Bazoilles-et-Ménil
- Location within France Location within Grand Est
- Coordinates: 48°15′32″N 6°06′22″E
- Country: France
- Region: Grand Est
- Department: Vosges
- Arrondissement: Neufchâteau
- Canton: Vittel
- Intercommunality: CC Terre d'eau

Government
  - Mayor (2020–2026): Bernard Antoine
- Area^{1}: 5.77 km^{2} (2.23 sq mi)
- Elevation: 295 m (968 ft)
- Highest elevation: 368 m (1,207 ft)
- Lowest elevation: 280 m (920 ft)
- Population (2023): 122
  - Density: 21.1/km^{2} (54.8/sq mi)
- Time zone: UTC+01:00 (CET)
  - Summer (DST): UTC+02:00 (CEST)
- INSEE/Postal code: 88043 /88500
- ^{1} French Land Register data, which excludes lakes, ponds, glaciers > 1 km^{2} (0.386 sq mi or 247 acres) and river estuaries.

Bazoilles-et-Ménil is a commune in the Vosges department in Grand Est in northeastern France.

== See also ==
- Communes of the Vosges department
