= They-sous-Montfort =

- Commune
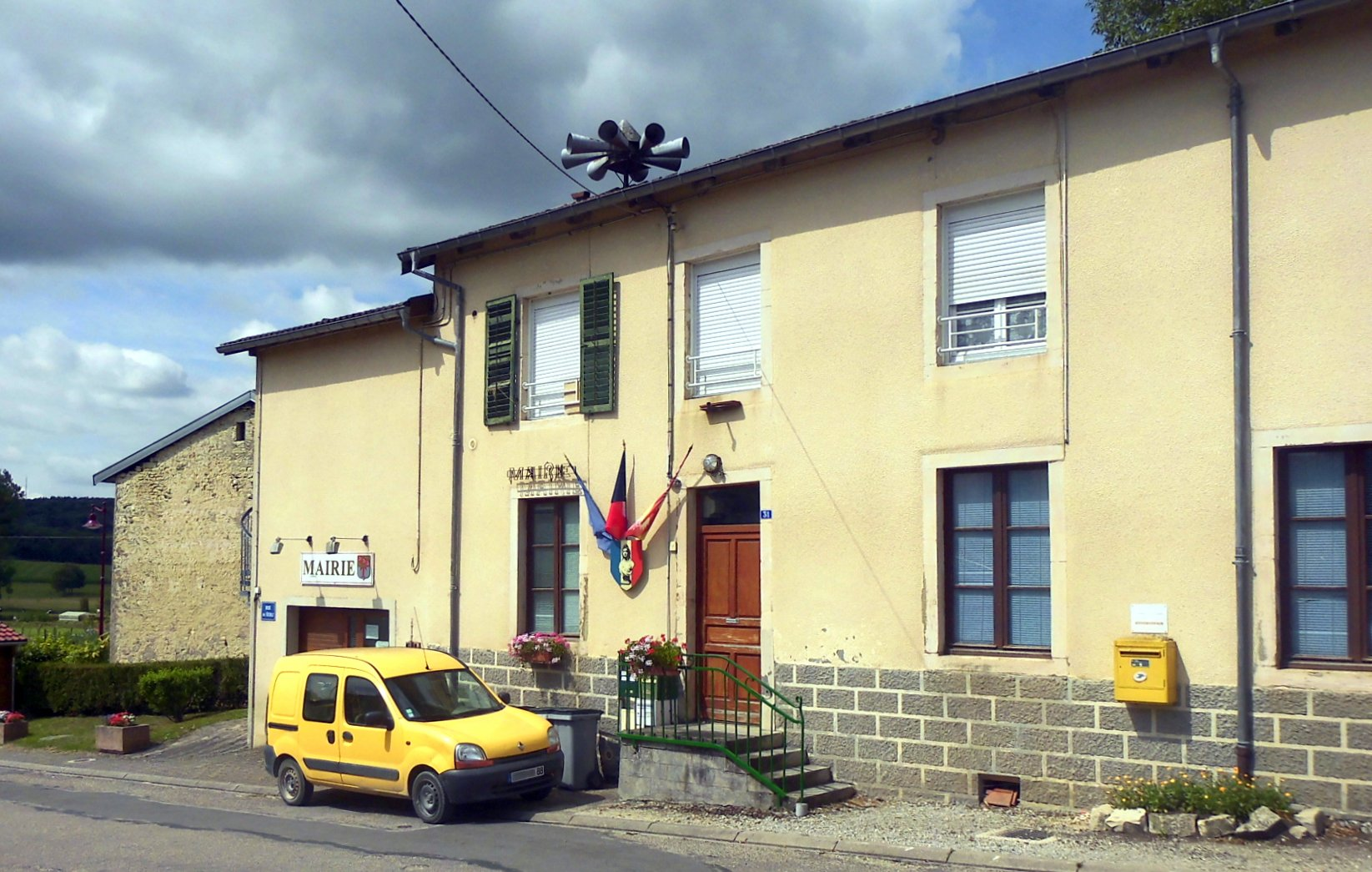
- The town hall in They-sous-Montfort

- Coat of arms
- Location of They-sous-Montfort
- Location within France Location within Grand Est
- Coordinates: 48°13′55″N 5°58′32″E
- Country: France
- Region: Grand Est
- Department: Vosges
- Arrondissement: Neufchâteau
- Canton: Vittel
- Intercommunality: CC Terre d'eau

Government
  - Mayor (2020–2026): Michel Nicolas
- Area^{1}: 10.21 km^{2} (3.94 sq mi)
- Highest elevation: 470 m (1,540 ft)
- Lowest elevation: 330 m (1,080 ft)
- Population (2023): 121
  - Density: 11.9/km^{2} (30.7/sq mi)
- Time zone: UTC+01:00 (CET)
  - Summer (DST): UTC+02:00 (CEST)
- INSEE/Postal code: 88466 /88800
- ^{1} French Land Register data, which excludes lakes, ponds, glaciers > 1 km^{2} (0.386 sq mi or 247 acres) and river estuaries.

They-sous-Montfort (French pronunciation: [tɛ su mɔ̃fɔʁ]) is a commune in the Vosges department in Grand Est in northeastern France.

== See also ==
- Communes of the Vosges department
