= Haréville =

- Commune
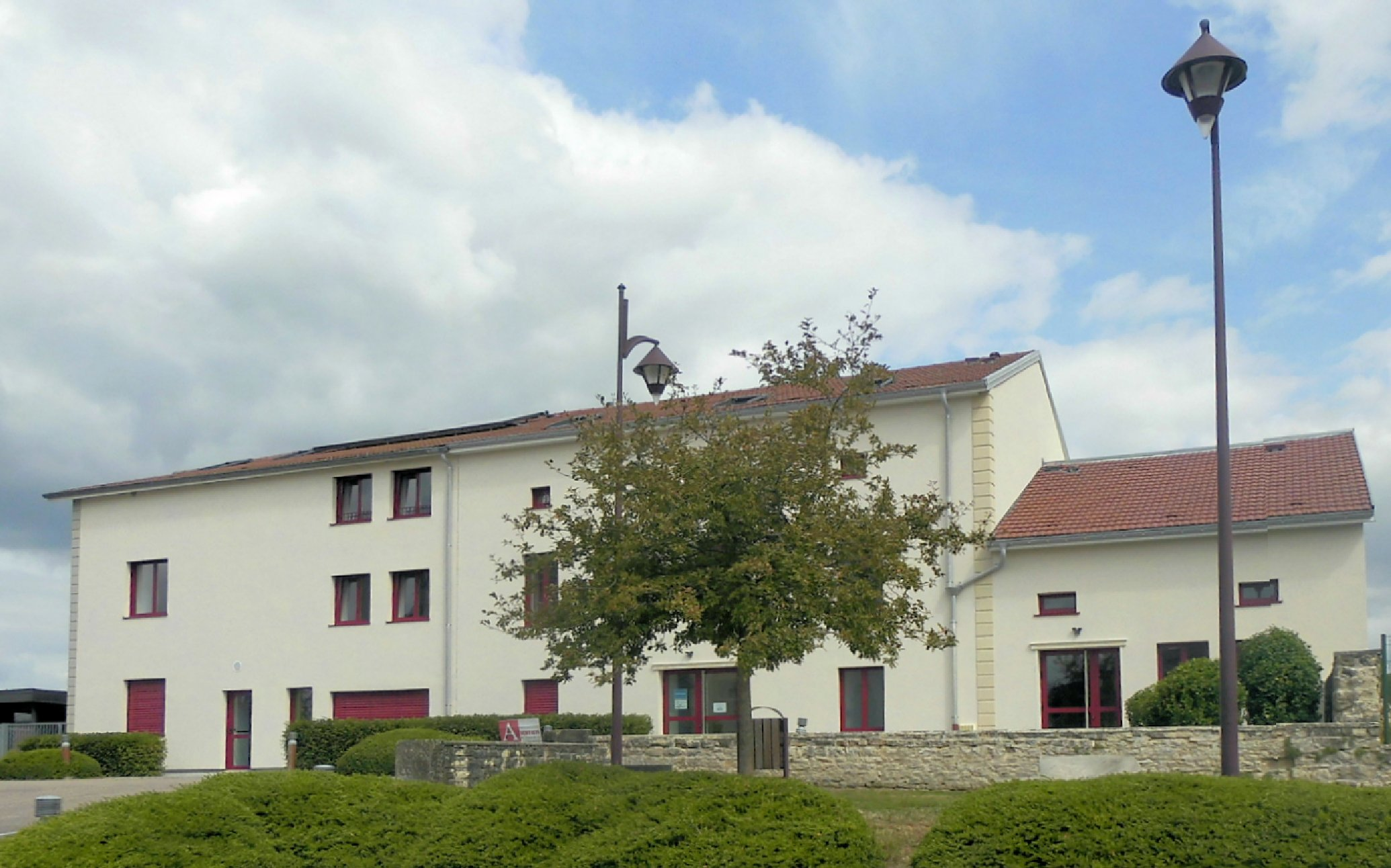
- The town hall and school in Haréville

- Coat of arms
- Location of Haréville
- Location within France Location within Grand Est
- Coordinates: 48°12′24″N 6°00′03″E
- Country: France
- Region: Grand Est
- Department: Vosges
- Arrondissement: Neufchâteau
- Canton: Vittel
- Intercommunality: CC Terre d'eau

Government
  - Mayor (2020–2026): Maurice Grosse
- Area^{1}: 6.56 km^{2} (2.53 sq mi)
- Elevation: 378 m (1,240 ft)
- Highest elevation: 412 m (1,352 ft)
- Lowest elevation: 339 m (1,112 ft)
- Population (2023): 465
  - Density: 70.9/km^{2} (184/sq mi)
- Time zone: UTC+01:00 (CET)
  - Summer (DST): UTC+02:00 (CEST)
- INSEE/Postal code: 88231 /88800
- ^{1} French Land Register data, which excludes lakes, ponds, glaciers > 1 km^{2} (0.386 sq mi or 247 acres) and river estuaries.

Haréville (French pronunciation: [aʁevil]) is a commune in the Vosges department in Grand Est in northeastern France.

== See also ==
- Communes of the Vosges department
