= Médonville =

- Commune
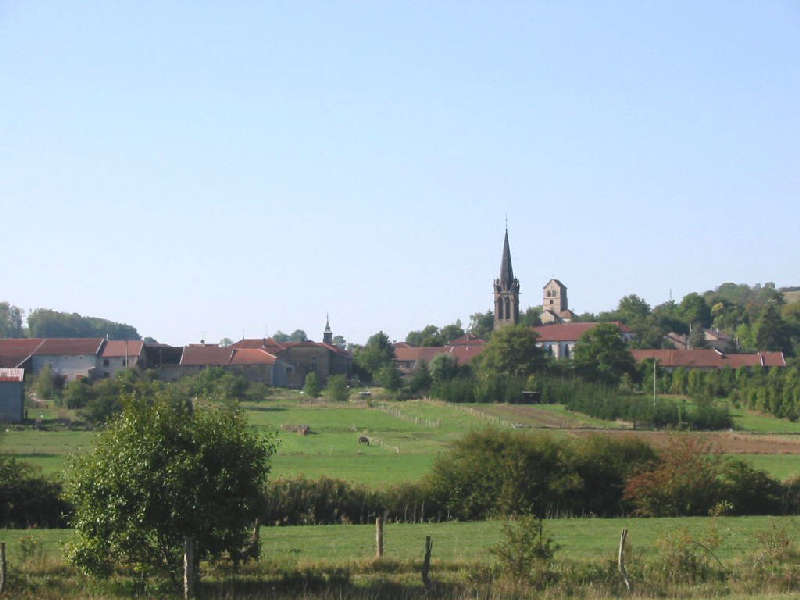
- A general view of Médonville
- Location of Médonville
- Location within France Location within Grand Est
- Coordinates: 48°13′12″N 5°43′55″E
- Country: France
- Region: Grand Est
- Department: Vosges
- Arrondissement: Neufchâteau
- Canton: Vittel
- Intercommunality: CC Terre d'eau

Government
  - Mayor (2020–2026): Patricia Pech
- Area^{1}: 7.27 km^{2} (2.81 sq mi)
- Elevation: 330 m (1,080 ft)
- Highest elevation: 491 m (1,611 ft)
- Lowest elevation: 316 m (1,037 ft)
- Population (2023): 52
  - Density: 7.2/km^{2} (19/sq mi)
- Time zone: UTC+01:00 (CET)
  - Summer (DST): UTC+02:00 (CEST)
- INSEE/Postal code: 88296 /88140
- ^{1} French Land Register data, which excludes lakes, ponds, glaciers > 1 km^{2} (0.386 sq mi or 247 acres) and river estuaries.

Médonville (French pronunciation: [medɔ̃vil]) is a commune in the Vosges department in Grand Est in northeastern France.

== See also ==
- Communes of the Vosges department
