= Estrennes =

- Commune
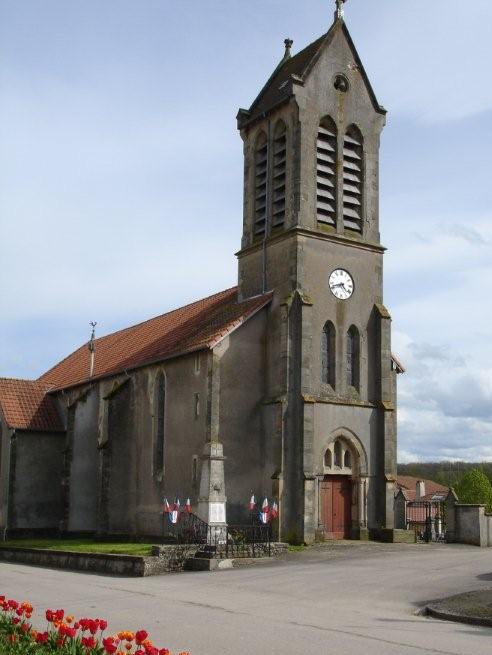
- The church in Estrennes
- Location of Estrennes
- Location within France Location within Grand Est
- Coordinates: 48°15′32″N 6°03′02″E
- Country: France
- Region: Grand Est
- Department: Vosges
- Arrondissement: Neufchâteau
- Canton: Vittel
- Intercommunality: CC Terre d'eau

Government
  - Mayor (2020–2026): Denis Mangenot
- Area^{1}: 5.99 km^{2} (2.31 sq mi)
- Highest elevation: 423 m (1,388 ft)
- Lowest elevation: 300 m (980 ft)
- Population (2023): 107
  - Density: 17.9/km^{2} (46.3/sq mi)
- Time zone: UTC+01:00 (CET)
  - Summer (DST): UTC+02:00 (CEST)
- INSEE/Postal code: 88164 /88500
- ^{1} French Land Register data, which excludes lakes, ponds, glaciers > 1 km^{2} (0.386 sq mi or 247 acres) and river estuaries.

Estrennes (French pronunciation: [etʁɛn]) is a commune in the Vosges department in Grand Est in northeastern France.

== See also ==
- Communes of the Vosges department
