= Domèvre-sous-Montfort =

- Commune
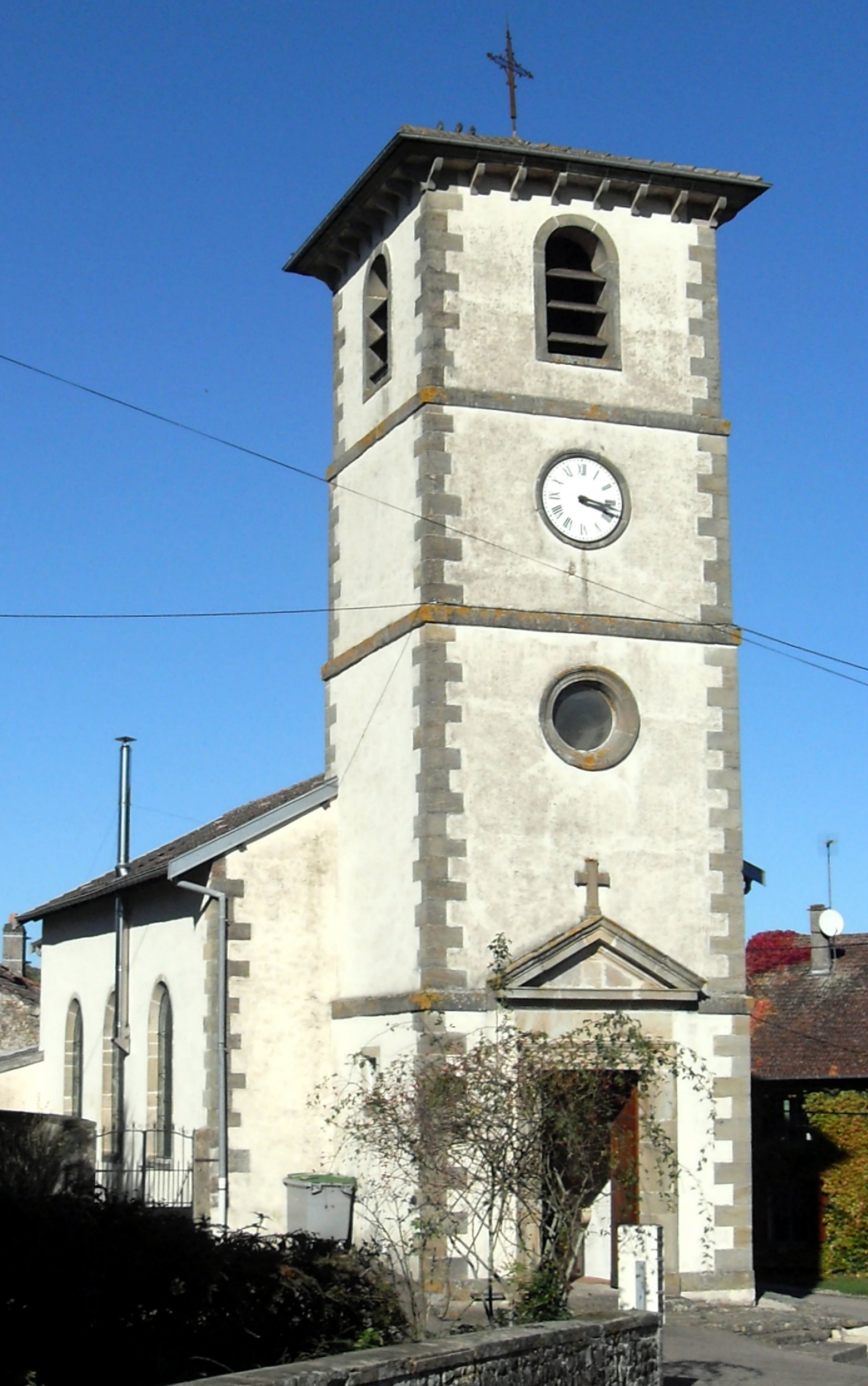
- The church in Domèvre-sous-Montfort
- Location of Domèvre-sous-Montfort
- Location within France Location within Grand Est
- Coordinates: 48°15′03″N 6°04′06″E
- Country: France
- Region: Grand Est
- Department: Vosges
- Arrondissement: Neufchâteau
- Canton: Vittel
- Intercommunality: CC Terre d'eau

Government
  - Mayor (2020–2026): Dominique Collin
- Area^{1}: 3.28 km^{2} (1.27 sq mi)
- Highest elevation: 391 m (1,283 ft)
- Lowest elevation: 294 m (965 ft)
- Population (2023): 61
  - Density: 19/km^{2} (48/sq mi)
- Time zone: UTC+01:00 (CET)
  - Summer (DST): UTC+02:00 (CEST)
- INSEE/Postal code: 88144 /88500
- ^{1} French Land Register data, which excludes lakes, ponds, glaciers > 1 km^{2} (0.386 sq mi or 247 acres) and river estuaries.

Domèvre-sous-Montfort (French pronunciation: [dɔmɛvʁ su mɔ̃fɔʁ]) is a commune in the Vosges department in Grand Est in northeastern France.

== See also ==
- Communes of the Vosges department
