= Dommartin-aux-Bois =

- Commune
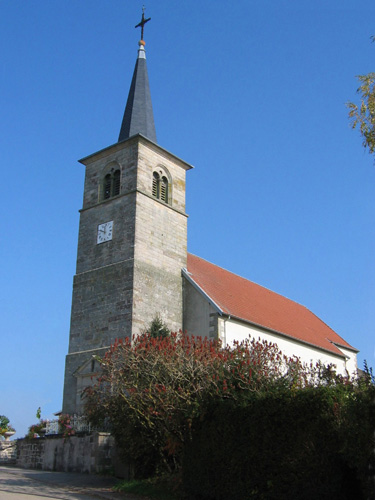
- The church in Dommartin-aux-Bois

- Coat of arms
- Location of Dommartin-aux-Bois
- Location within France Location within Grand Est
- Coordinates: 48°09′35″N 6°16′32″E
- Country: France
- Region: Grand Est
- Department: Vosges
- Arrondissement: Neufchâteau
- Canton: Darney
- Intercommunality: CC Mirecourt Dompaire

Government
  - Mayor (2020–2026): Patrick Rambaut
- Area^{1}: 15.7 km^{2} (6.1 sq mi)
- Elevation: 340 m (1,120 ft)
- Highest elevation: 427 m (1,401 ft)
- Lowest elevation: 327 m (1,073 ft)
- Population (2023): 411
  - Density: 26.2/km^{2} (67.8/sq mi)
- Time zone: UTC+01:00 (CET)
  - Summer (DST): UTC+02:00 (CEST)
- INSEE/Postal code: 88147 /88390
- ^{1} French Land Register data, which excludes lakes, ponds, glaciers > 1 km^{2} (0.386 sq mi or 247 acres) and river estuaries.

Dommartin-aux-Bois (French pronunciation: [dɔmaʁtɛ̃ o bwa]) is a commune in the Vosges department in Grand Est in northeastern France.

== See also ==
- Communes of the Vosges department
