= Remicourt, Vosges =

Remicourt
- Commune
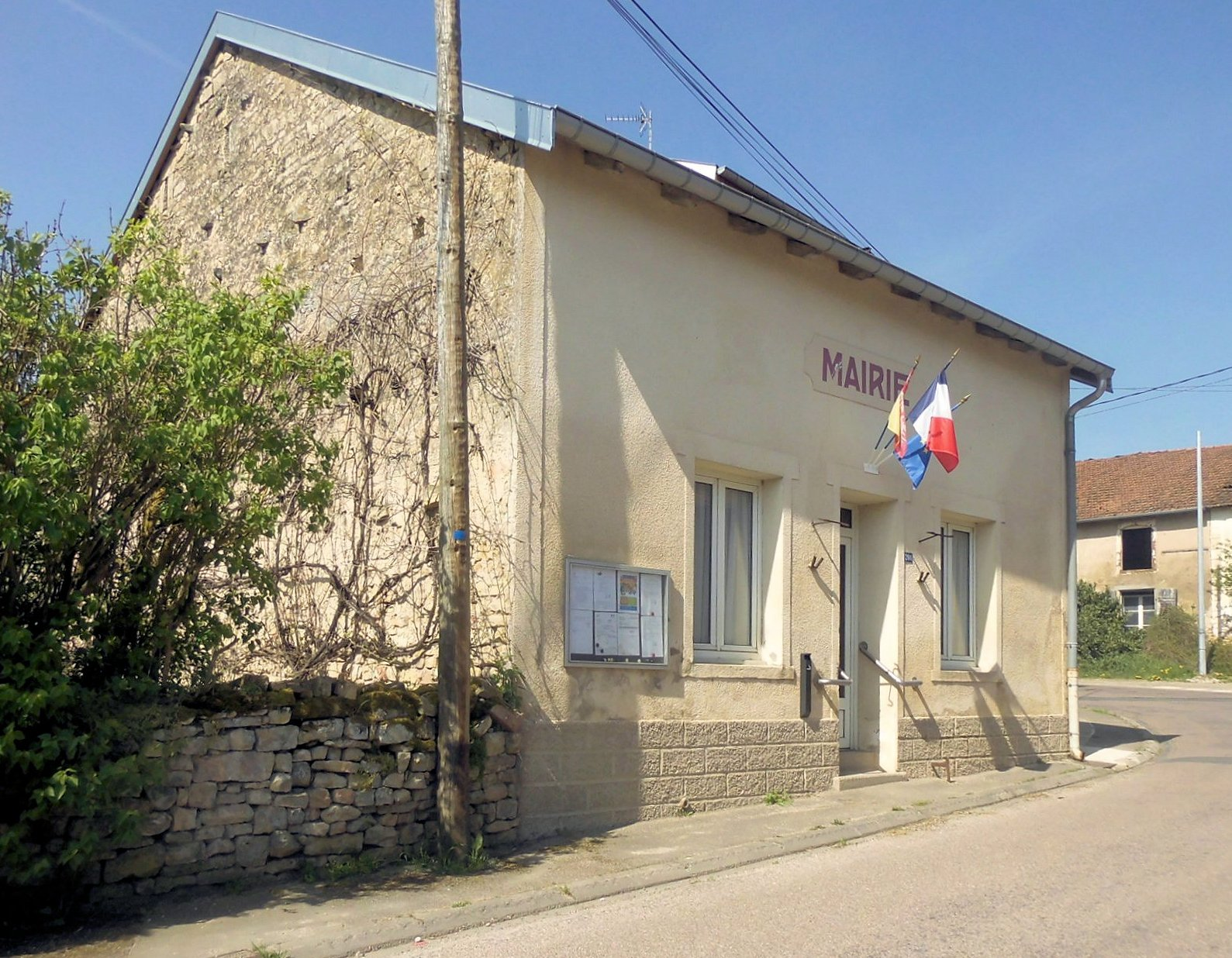
- The town hall in Remicourt
- Location of Remicourt
- Location within France Location within Grand Est
- Coordinates: 48°17′09″N 6°03′34″E
- Country: France
- Region: Grand Est
- Department: Vosges
- Arrondissement: Neufchâteau
- Canton: Mirecourt
- Intercommunality: CC Mirecourt Dompaire

Government
  - Mayor (2020–2026): Philippe Giron
- Area^{1}: 4.22 km^{2} (1.63 sq mi)
- Elevation: 300 m (980 ft)
- Highest elevation: 400 m (1,300 ft)
- Lowest elevation: 289 m (948 ft)
- Population (2023): 63
  - Density: 15/km^{2} (39/sq mi)
- Time zone: UTC+01:00 (CET)
  - Summer (DST): UTC+02:00 (CEST)
- INSEE/Postal code: 88382 /88500
- ^{1} French Land Register data, which excludes lakes, ponds, glaciers > 1 km^{2} (0.386 sq mi or 247 acres) and river estuaries.

Remicourt is a commune in the Vosges department in Grand Est in northeastern France.

== See also ==
- Communes of the Vosges department
