= Madecourt =

- Commune
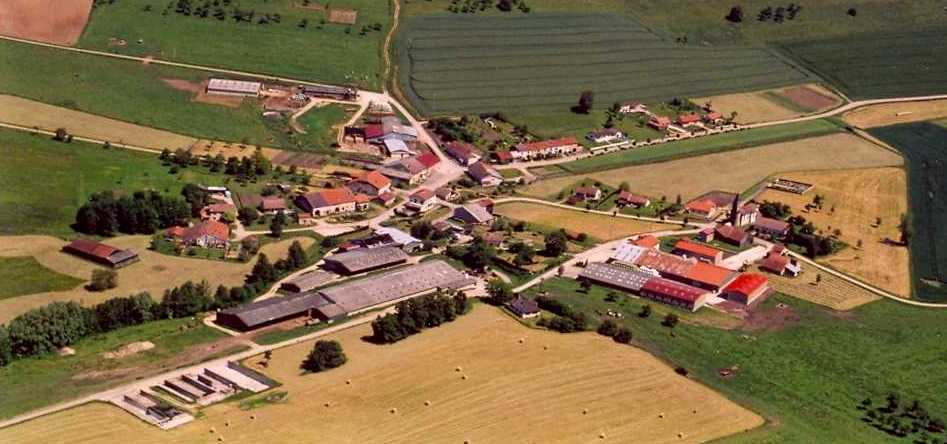
- A general view of Madecourt
- Location of Madecourt
- Location within France Location within Grand Est
- Coordinates: 48°14′30″N 6°07′15″E
- Country: France
- Region: Grand Est
- Department: Vosges
- Arrondissement: Neufchâteau
- Canton: Mirecourt
- Intercommunality: CC Mirecourt Dompaire

Government
  - Mayor (2020–2026): Dominique Serdet
- Area^{1}: 4.49 km^{2} (1.73 sq mi)
- Elevation: 293 m (961 ft)
- Highest elevation: 415 m (1,362 ft)
- Lowest elevation: 290 m (950 ft)
- Population (2023): 52
  - Density: 12/km^{2} (30/sq mi)
- Time zone: UTC+01:00 (CET)
  - Summer (DST): UTC+02:00 (CEST)
- INSEE/Postal code: 88279 /88270
- ^{1} French Land Register data, which excludes lakes, ponds, glaciers > 1 km^{2} (0.386 sq mi or 247 acres) and river estuaries.

Madecourt (French pronunciation: [madkuʁ]) is a commune in the Vosges department in Grand Est in northeastern France.

== See also ==
- Communes of the Vosges department
