= Thiraucourt =

- Commune
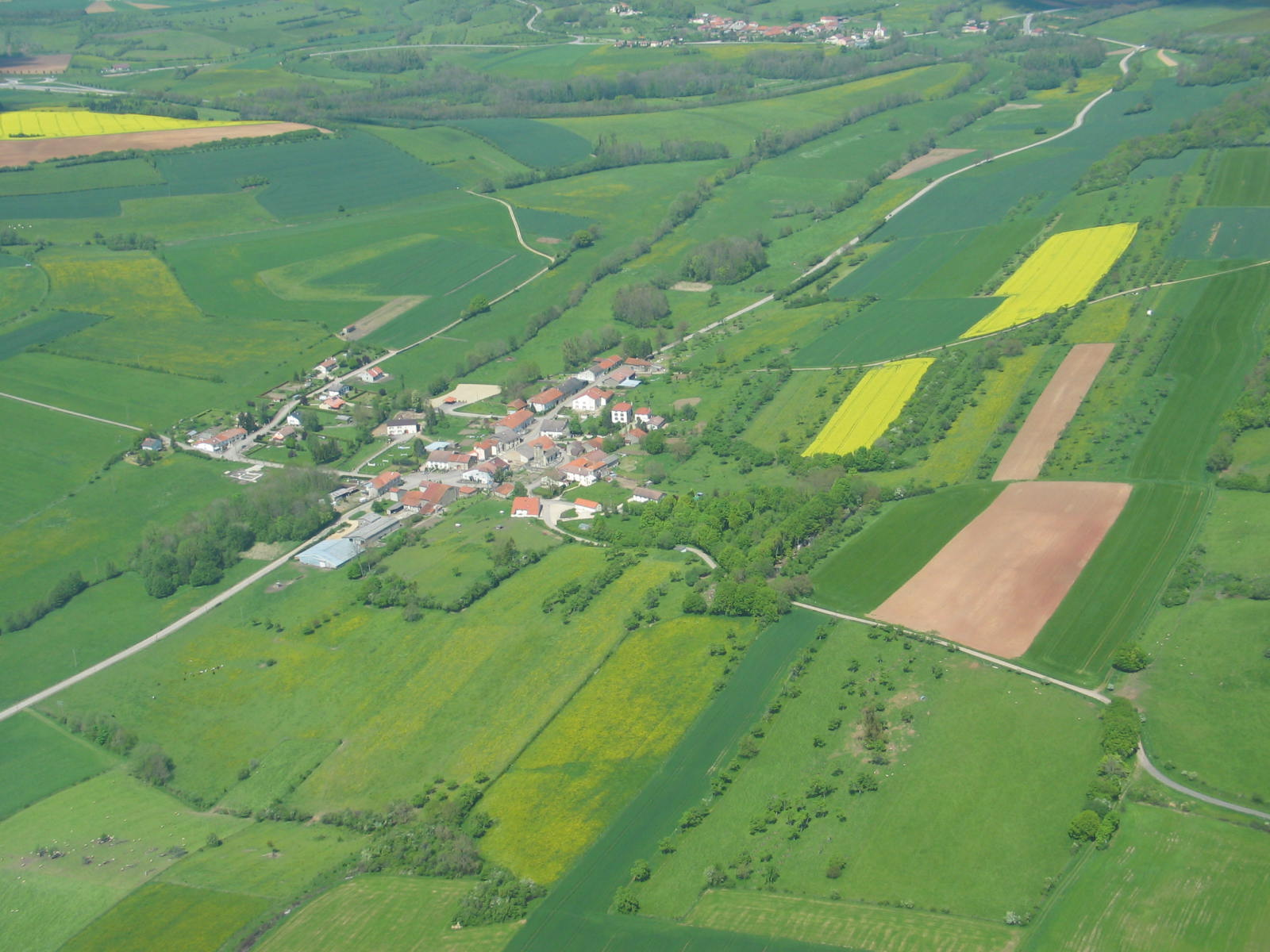
- A general view of Thiraucourt
- Location of Thiraucourt
- Location within France Location within Grand Est
- Coordinates: 48°17′35″N 6°04′24″E
- Country: France
- Region: Grand Est
- Department: Vosges
- Arrondissement: Neufchâteau
- Canton: Mirecourt
- Intercommunality: CC Mirecourt Dompaire

Government
  - Mayor (2020–2026): Ervé Perrin
- Area^{1}: 3.02 km^{2} (1.17 sq mi)
- Elevation: 296 m (971 ft)
- Highest elevation: 388 m (1,273 ft)
- Lowest elevation: 283 m (928 ft)
- Population (2023): 101
  - Density: 33.4/km^{2} (86.6/sq mi)
- Time zone: UTC+01:00 (CET)
  - Summer (DST): UTC+02:00 (CEST)
- INSEE/Postal code: 88469 /88500
- ^{1} French Land Register data, which excludes lakes, ponds, glaciers > 1 km^{2} (0.386 sq mi or 247 acres) and river estuaries.

Thiraucourt (French pronunciation: [tiʁokuʁ]) is a commune in the Vosges department in Grand Est in northeastern France.

== See also ==
- Communes of the Vosges department
