= Communauté de communes de Mirecourt Dompaire =

Federation of municipalities in France

Mirecourt Dompaire
- Communauté de communes
- Interactive map of Mirecourt Dompaire
- Coordinates: 48°17′N 06°11′E
- Country: France
- Region: Grand Est
- Department: Vosges
- No. of communes: {{{nbcomm}}}
- Established: 2017
- Area: 473.7 km^{2} (182.9 sq mi)
- Population (2019): 18,863
  - Density: 39.82/km^{2} (103.1/sq mi)

The Communauté de communes de Mirecourt Dompaire is an administrative association of rural communes in the Vosges department of eastern France. It was created on 1 January 2017 by the merger of the former Communauté de communes du Pays de Mirecourt (which had absorbed the former Communauté de communes du Xaintois in January 2014), Communauté de communes du Secteur de Dompaire and 16 other communes. On 1 January 2018 it lost 2 communes to the Communauté d'agglomération d'Épinal. It consists of 76 communes, and has its administrative offices at Mirecourt. Its area is 473.7 km^{2}, and its population was 18,863 in 2019.

== Composition ==
The communauté de communes consists of the following 76 communes:

1. Les Ableuvenettes
2. Ahéville
3. Ambacourt
4. Avillers
5. Avrainville
6. Bainville-aux-Saules
7. Battexey
8. Baudricourt
9. Bazegney
10. Begnécourt
11. Bettegney-Saint-Brice
12. Bettoncourt
13. Biécourt
14. Blémerey
15. Bocquegney
16. Boulaincourt
17. Bouxières-aux-Bois
18. Bouxurulles
19. Bouzemont
20. Chauffecourt
21. Chef-Haut
22. Circourt
23. Damas-et-Bettegney
24. Derbamont
25. Dombasle-en-Xaintois
26. Dommartin-aux-Bois
27. Dompaire
28. Domvallier
29. Évaux-et-Ménil
30. Frenelle-la-Grande
31. Frenelle-la-Petite
32. Gelvécourt-et-Adompt
33. Gircourt-lès-Viéville
34. Gorhey
35. Gugney-aux-Aulx
36. Hagécourt
37. Harol
38. Hennecourt
39. Hymont
40. Jorxey
41. Juvaincourt
42. Légéville-et-Bonfays
43. Madecourt
44. Madegney
45. Madonne-et-Lamerey
46. Marainville-sur-Madon
47. Maroncourt
48. Mattaincourt
49. Mazirot
50. Mirecourt
51. Oëlleville
52. Pierrefitte
53. Pont-sur-Madon
54. Poussay
55. Puzieux
56. Racécourt
57. Ramecourt
58. Rancourt
59. Rapey
60. Regney
61. Remicourt
62. Repel
63. Rouvres-en-Xaintois
64. Saint-Prancher
65. Saint-Vallier
66. Thiraucourt
67. Totainville
68. Valleroy-aux-Saules
69. Varmonzey
70. Vaubexy
71. Velotte-et-Tatignécourt
72. Villers
73. Ville-sur-Illon
74. Vomécourt-sur-Madon
75. Vroville
76. Xaronval
