= Ramecourt, Vosges =

Ramecourt
- Commune
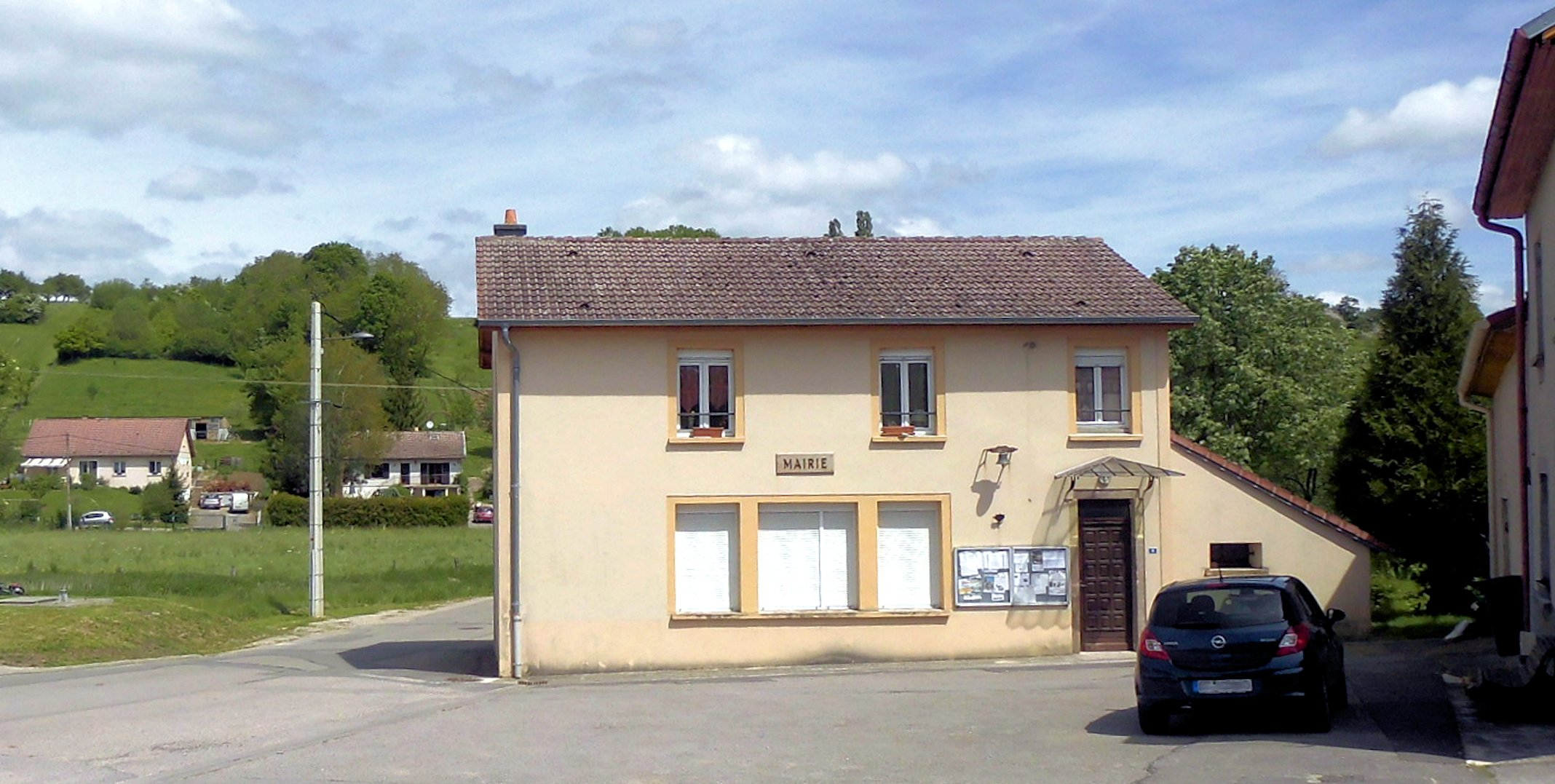
- The town hall in Ramecourt
- Location of Ramecourt
- Location within France Location within Grand Est
- Coordinates: 48°18′41″N 6°06′03″E
- Country: France
- Region: Grand Est
- Department: Vosges
- Arrondissement: Neufchâteau
- Canton: Mirecourt
- Intercommunality: CC Mirecourt Dompaire

Government
  - Mayor (2020–2026): Laurent Comesse
- Area^{1}: 3.26 km^{2} (1.26 sq mi)
- Elevation: 282 m (925 ft)
- Highest elevation: 345 m (1,132 ft)
- Lowest elevation: 274 m (899 ft)
- Population (2023): 144
  - Density: 44.2/km^{2} (114/sq mi)
- Time zone: UTC+01:00 (CET)
  - Summer (DST): UTC+02:00 (CEST)
- INSEE/Postal code: 88368 /88500
- ^{1} French Land Register data, which excludes lakes, ponds, glaciers > 1 km^{2} (0.386 sq mi or 247 acres) and river estuaries.

Ramecourt (French pronunciation: [ʁamkuʁ]) is a commune in the Vosges department in Grand Est in northeastern France.

Inhabitants are called Ramecurtiens.

== Geography ==
Ramecourt is a small rural village approximately 3 kilometres (2 mi) to the west of Mirecourt and 18 kilometres (11 mi) to the north-east of Vittel. The village enjoys the soothing presence of the little stream that flows along the Arol Valley (Val d’Arol). The proximity of several thermal resorts, the sunlit mountains, and the trout fishing available in the stream make the village one that welcomes visitors. The picturesque orchards, pastureland and hedges that surround the village reflect the nature of the local agriculture.

== Victor Hugo ==
The deaths of Jean Hugo and of his wife, Catherine Mansuy, paternal great-great-grandparents to Victor Hugo, are mentioned in the parish register of the adjacent commune of Domvallier as having occurred respectively in November and December 1731. Jean had been born at Vaudémont in 1648, and that is where he married his wife in 1673, but around 1700 they came to live at Ramecourt. Their children included Jean Philippe Hugo, apparently married to another Catherine. These produced Joseph Hugo 1727 - 1799, grandfather to the famous writer.

There had been a Hugo family in Ramecourt earlier. On 20 August 1631 Claudon Hugo, known according to one source as 'The Hollander', signed a contract with the town of Mirecourt for the burial of plague victims. At the date of the contract he was residing with his uncle François Hugo of Ramecourt. Claudon Hugo was for many years believed to be a direct ancestor of Victor Hugo: it is now thought that the shared kinship of these two was less direct, however.

== See also ==
- Communes of the Vosges department
