= Pierrefitte, Vosges =

Pierrefitte
- Commune
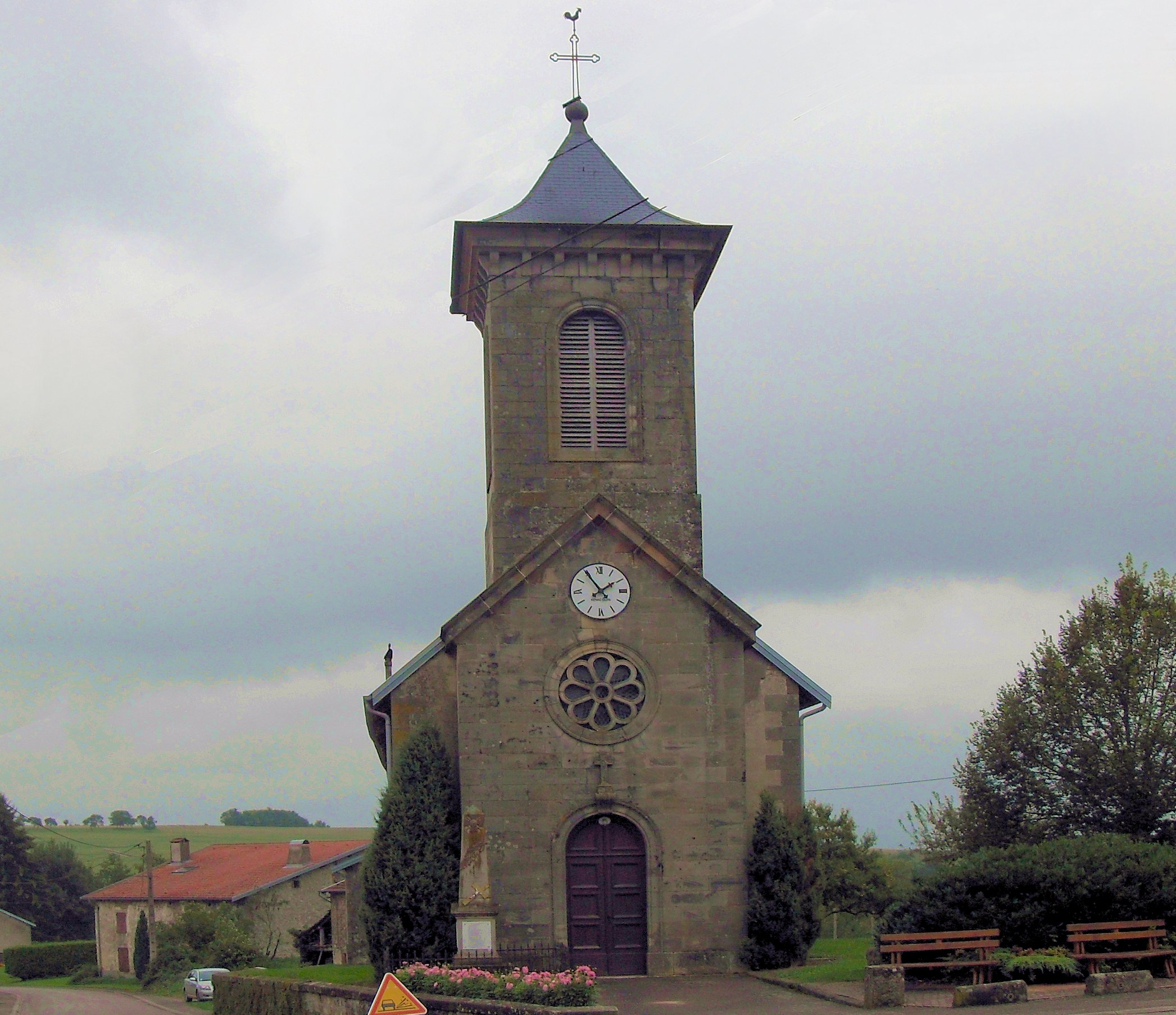
- The church in Pierrefitte
- Location of Pierrefitte
- Location within France Location within Grand Est
- Coordinates: 48°10′10″N 6°10′37″E
- Country: France
- Region: Grand Est
- Department: Vosges
- Arrondissement: Neufchâteau
- Canton: Darney
- Intercommunality: CC Mirecourt Dompaire

Government
  - Mayor (2020–2026): Laurent Hayotte
- Area^{1}: 8.78 km^{2} (3.39 sq mi)
- Elevation: 350 m (1,150 ft)
- Highest elevation: 389 m (1,276 ft)
- Lowest elevation: 295 m (968 ft)
- Population (2023): 134
  - Density: 15.3/km^{2} (39.5/sq mi)
- Time zone: UTC+01:00 (CET)
  - Summer (DST): UTC+02:00 (CEST)
- INSEE/Postal code: 88347 /88270
- ^{1} French Land Register data, which excludes lakes, ponds, glaciers > 1 km^{2} (0.386 sq mi or 247 acres) and river estuaries.

Pierrefitte (French pronunciation: [pjɛʁfit]) is a commune in the Vosges department in Grand Est in northeastern France.

== See also ==
- Communes of the Vosges department
