= Bocquegney =

- Commune
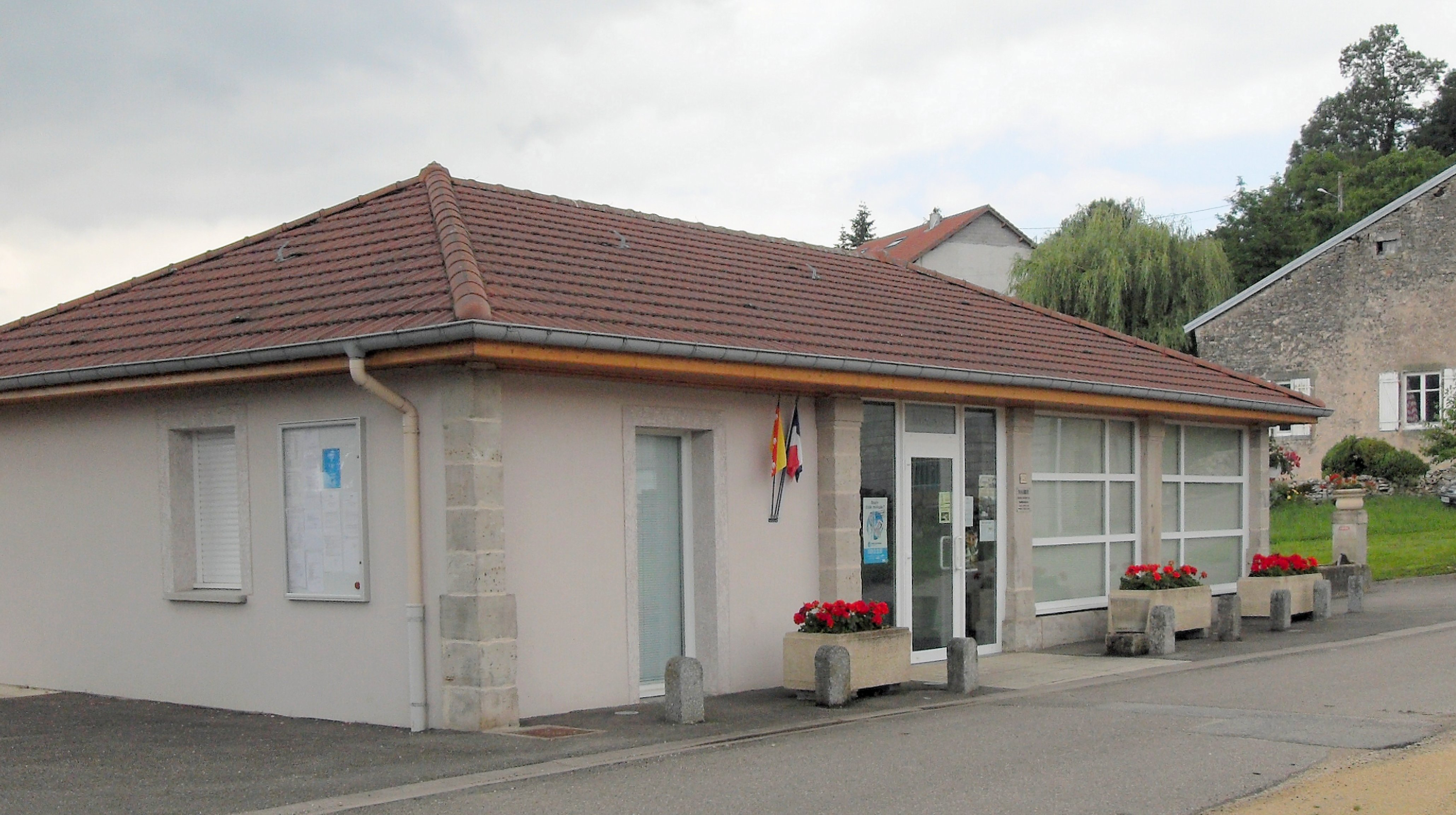
- The town hall in Bocquegney
- Location of Bocquegney
- Location within France Location within Grand Est
- Coordinates: 48°13′16″N 6°18′14″E
- Country: France
- Region: Grand Est
- Department: Vosges
- Arrondissement: Neufchâteau
- Canton: Darney
- Intercommunality: CC Mirecourt Dompaire

Government
  - Mayor (2020–2026): Jean-Marie Thomas
- Area^{1}: 4.57 km^{2} (1.76 sq mi)
- Elevation: 375 m (1,230 ft)
- Highest elevation: 411 m (1,348 ft)
- Lowest elevation: 332 m (1,089 ft)
- Population (2023): 131
  - Density: 28.7/km^{2} (74.2/sq mi)
- Time zone: UTC+01:00 (CET)
  - Summer (DST): UTC+02:00 (CEST)
- INSEE/Postal code: 88063 /88270
- ^{1} French Land Register data, which excludes lakes, ponds, glaciers > 1 km^{2} (0.386 sq mi or 247 acres) and river estuaries.

Bocquegney (French pronunciation: [bɔkɲɛ]) is a commune in the Vosges department in Grand Est in northeastern France.

== See also ==
- Communes of the Vosges department
