= Circourt =

- Commune
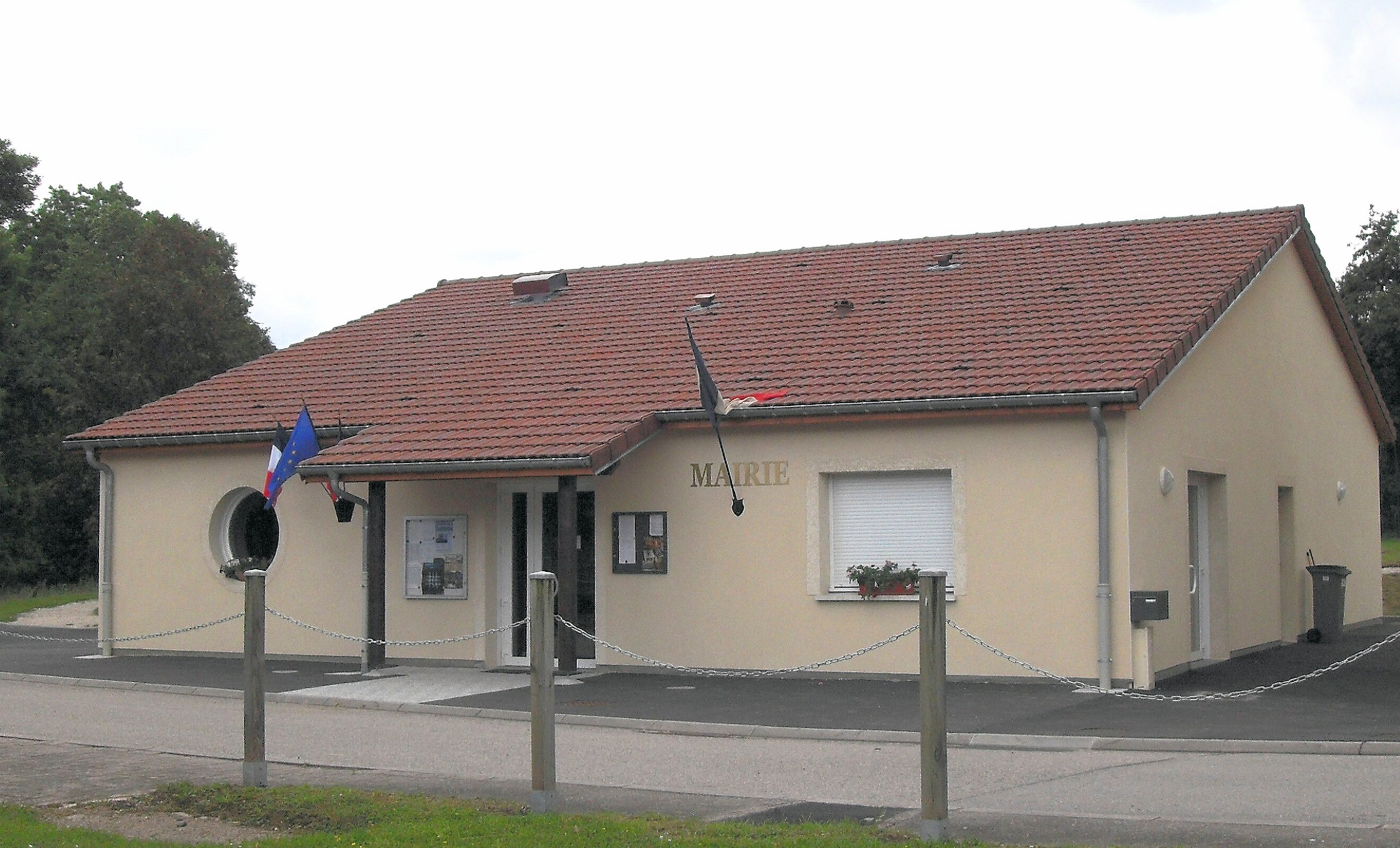
- The town hall in Circourt
- Location of Circourt
- Location within France Location within Grand Est
- Coordinates: 48°15′16″N 6°17′01″E
- Country: France
- Region: Grand Est
- Department: Vosges
- Arrondissement: Neufchâteau
- Canton: Darney
- Intercommunality: CC Mirecourt Dompaire

Government
  - Mayor (2020–2026): Emilien Jeandel
- Area^{1}: 5.93 km^{2} (2.29 sq mi)
- Elevation: 330 m (1,080 ft)
- Highest elevation: 465 m (1,526 ft)
- Lowest elevation: 311 m (1,020 ft)
- Population (2023): 79
  - Density: 13/km^{2} (35/sq mi)
- Time zone: UTC+01:00 (CET)
  - Summer (DST): UTC+02:00 (CEST)
- INSEE/Postal code: 88103 /88270
- ^{1} French Land Register data, which excludes lakes, ponds, glaciers > 1 km^{2} (0.386 sq mi or 247 acres) and river estuaries.

Circourt (French pronunciation: [siʁkuʁ]) is a commune in the Vosges department in Grand Est in northeastern France.

== See also ==
- Communes of the Vosges department
