= Gugney-aux-Aulx =

- Commune
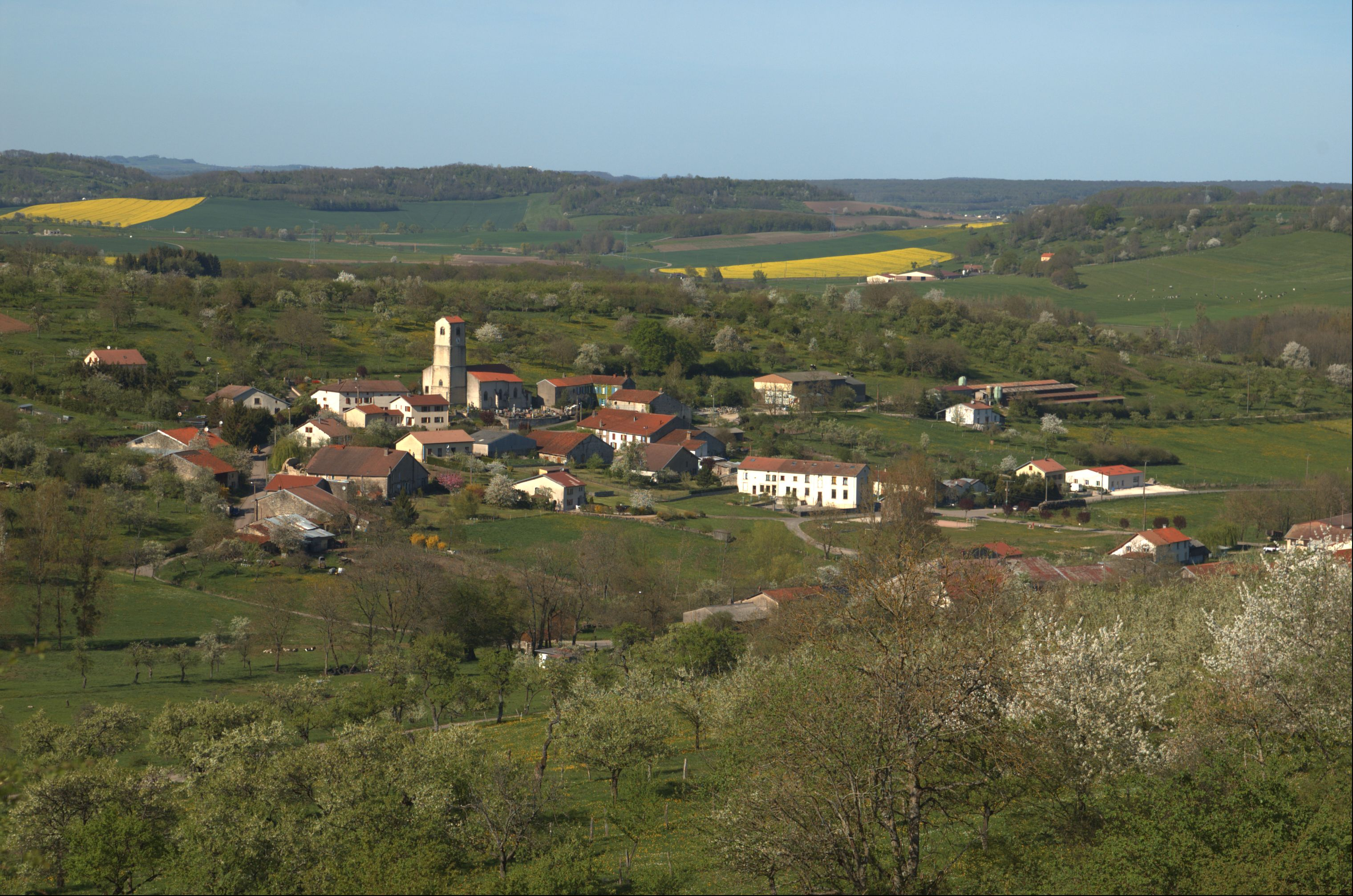
- A general view of Gugney-aux-Aulx
- Location of Gugney-aux-Aulx
- Location within France Location within Grand Est
- Coordinates: 48°18′13″N 6°16′15″E
- Country: France
- Region: Grand Est
- Department: Vosges
- Arrondissement: Neufchâteau
- Canton: Charmes
- Intercommunality: CC Mirecourt Dompaire

Government
  - Mayor (2020–2026): Rémy Vaudois
- Area^{1}: 8.67 km^{2} (3.35 sq mi)
- Highest elevation: 421 m (1,381 ft)
- Lowest elevation: 295 m (968 ft)
- Population (2023): 172
  - Density: 19.8/km^{2} (51.4/sq mi)
- Time zone: UTC+01:00 (CET)
  - Summer (DST): UTC+02:00 (CEST)
- INSEE/Postal code: 88223 /88450
- ^{1} French Land Register data, which excludes lakes, ponds, glaciers > 1 km^{2} (0.386 sq mi or 247 acres) and river estuaries.

Gugney-aux-Aulx (French pronunciation: [ɡyɲɛ o.z‿o]) is a commune in the Vosges department in Grand Est in northeastern France. As of 2011, the commune has a population of 156.

== See also ==
- Communes of the Vosges department
