= Les Ableuvenettes =

- Commune
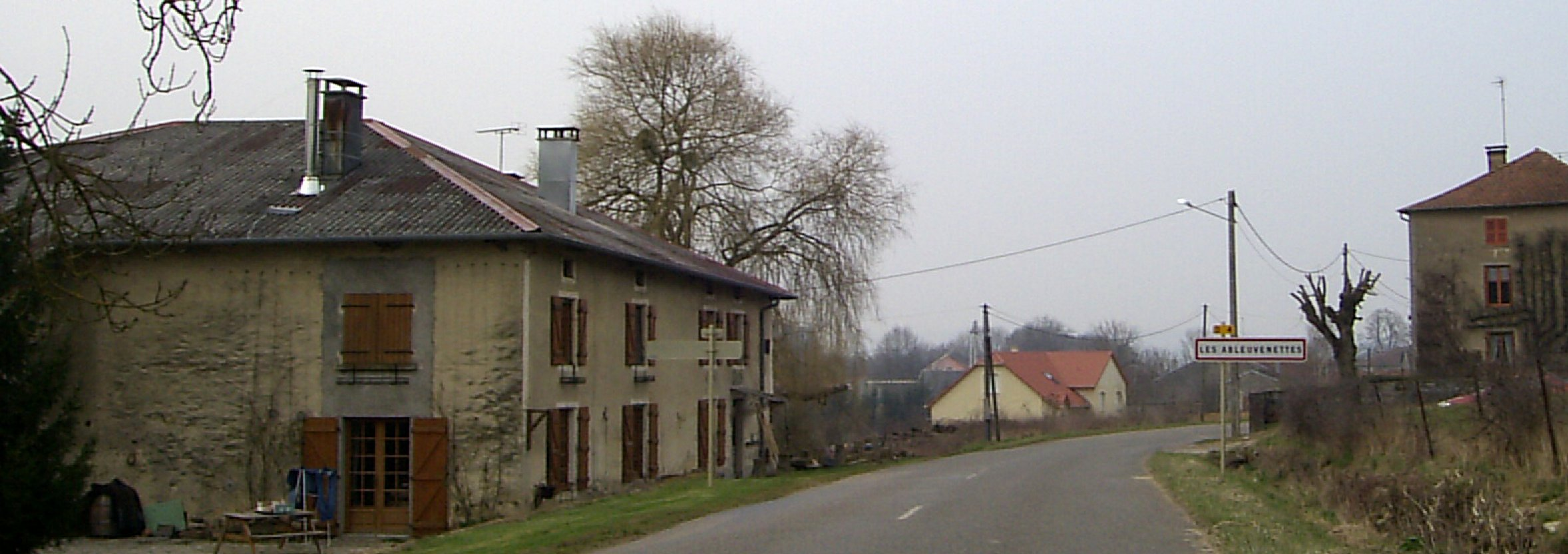
- The road into Les Ableuvenettes
- Location of Les Ableuvenettes
- Location within France Location within Grand Est
- Coordinates: 48°11′28″N 6°11′10″E
- Country: France
- Region: Grand Est
- Department: Vosges
- Arrondissement: Neufchâteau
- Canton: Darney
- Intercommunality: CC Mirecourt Dompaire

Government
  - Mayor (2020–2026): Jérôme Contejean
- Area^{1}: 4.49 km^{2} (1.73 sq mi)
- Elevation: 318 m (1,043 ft)
- Highest elevation: 387 m (1,270 ft)
- Lowest elevation: 293 m (961 ft)
- Population (2023): 72
  - Density: 16/km^{2} (42/sq mi)
- Time zone: UTC+01:00 (CET)
  - Summer (DST): UTC+02:00 (CEST)
- INSEE/Postal code: 88001 /88270
- ^{1} French Land Register data, which excludes lakes, ponds, glaciers > 1 km^{2} (0.386 sq mi or 247 acres) and river estuaries.

Les Ableuvenettes (French pronunciation: [le.z‿ablœvnɛt]) is a commune in the Vosges department in Grand Est in northeastern France. The discovery of coins certifies that Romans once occupied the area.

The first mention of Les Ableuvenettes dates from 1148, in the form of Albuvisnei.

== See also ==
- Communes of the Vosges department
