= Hennecourt =

- Commune
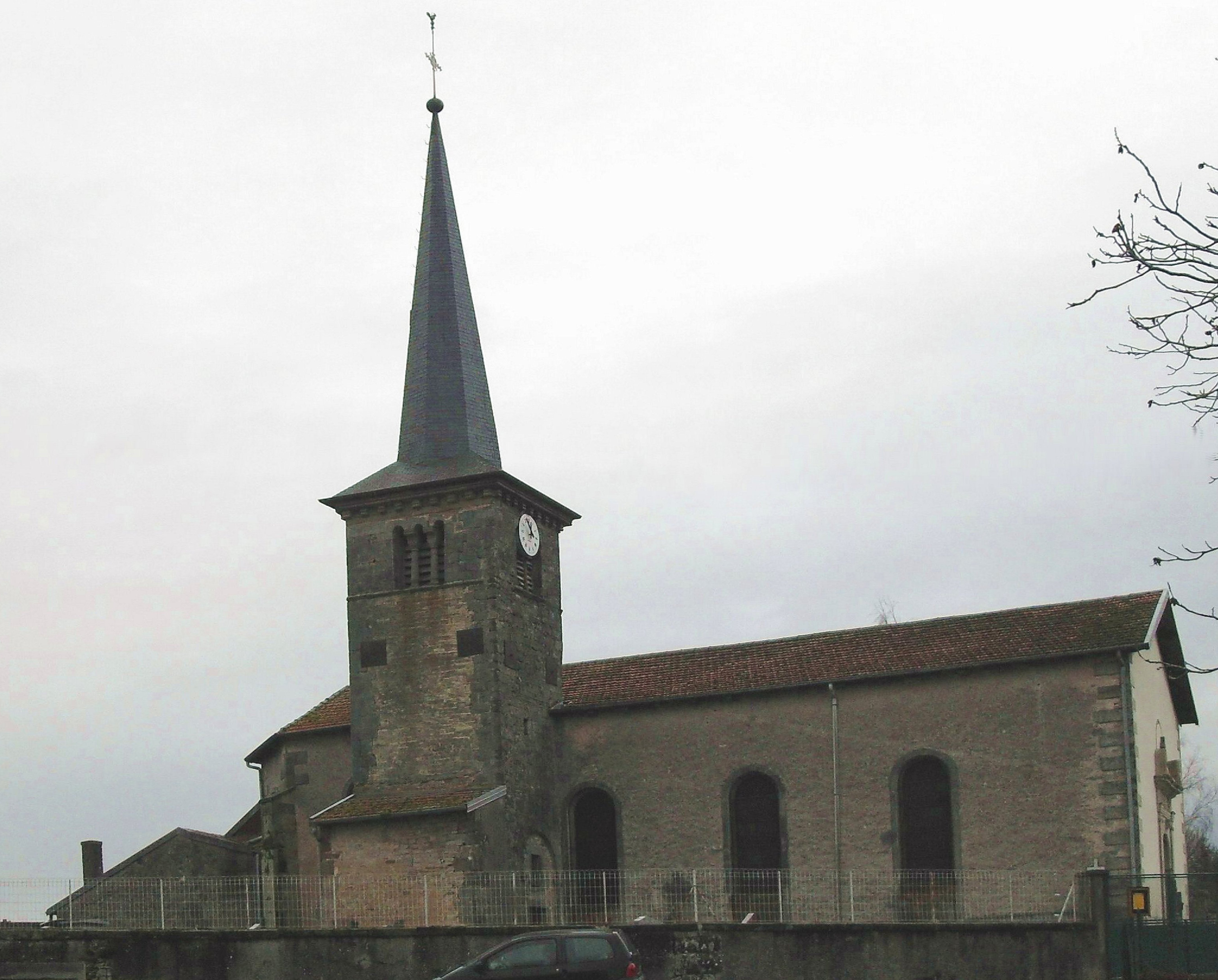
- The church in Hennecourt
- Location of Hennecourt
- Location within France Location within Grand Est
- Coordinates: 48°12′27″N 6°17′08″E
- Country: France
- Region: Grand Est
- Department: Vosges
- Arrondissement: Neufchâteau
- Canton: Darney
- Intercommunality: CC Mirecourt Dompaire

Government
  - Mayor (2020–2026): Christine Adam
- Area^{1}: 7.17 km^{2} (2.77 sq mi)
- Elevation: 325 m (1,066 ft)
- Highest elevation: 419 m (1,375 ft)
- Lowest elevation: 304 m (997 ft)
- Population (2023): 343
  - Density: 47.8/km^{2} (124/sq mi)
- Time zone: UTC+01:00 (CET)
  - Summer (DST): UTC+02:00 (CEST)
- INSEE/Postal code: 88237 /88270
- ^{1} French Land Register data, which excludes lakes, ponds, glaciers > 1 km^{2} (0.386 sq mi or 247 acres) and river estuaries.

Hennecourt (French pronunciation: [ɛnkuʁ]) is a commune in the Vosges department in Grand Est in northeastern France.

== See also ==
- Communes of the Vosges department
