= Saint-Vallier, Vosges =

Saint-Vallier
- Commune
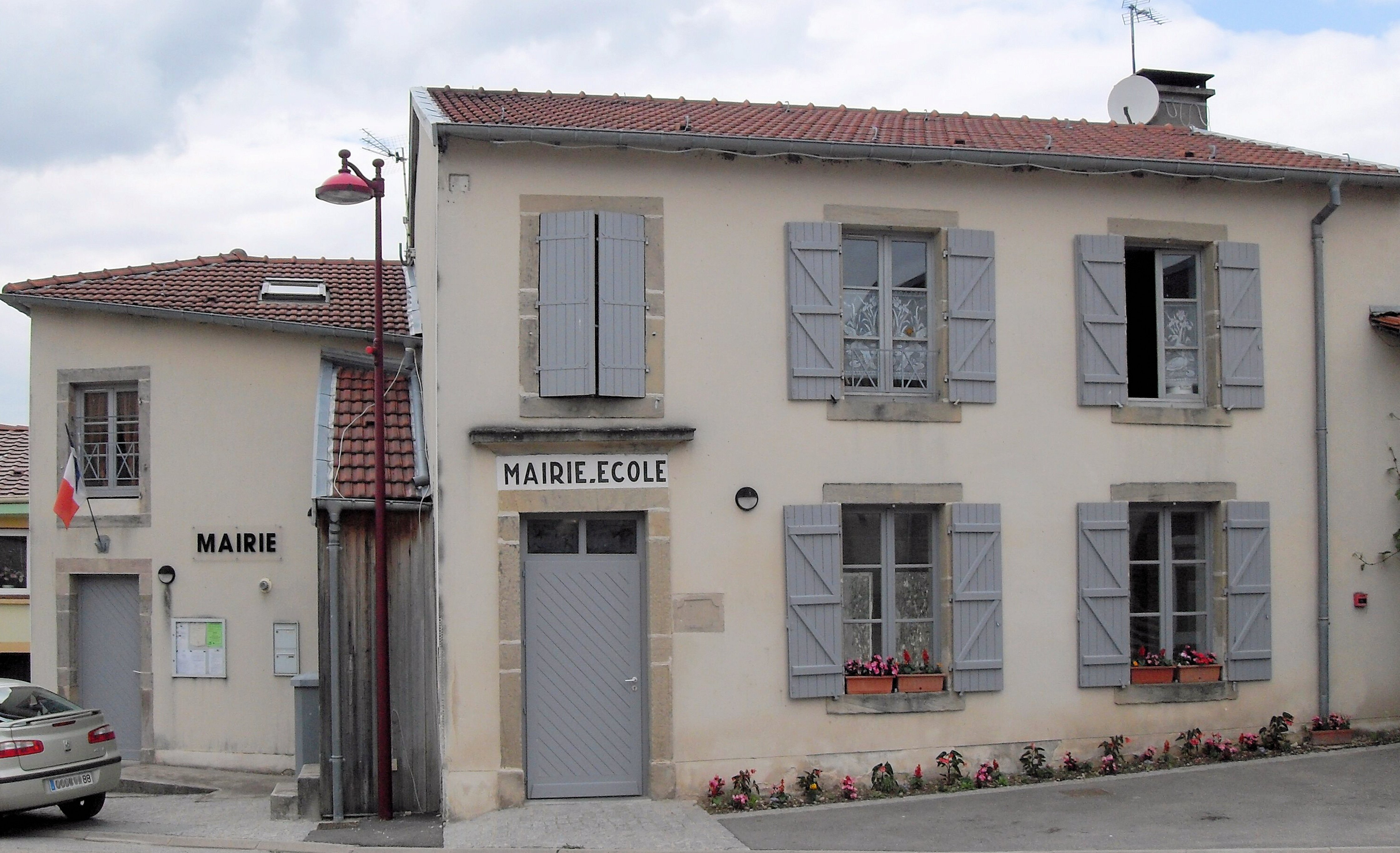
- The town hall in Saint-Vallier
- Location of Saint-Vallier
- Location within France Location within Grand Est
- Coordinates: 48°16′48″N 6°18′57″E
- Country: France
- Region: Grand Est
- Department: Vosges
- Arrondissement: Neufchâteau
- Canton: Charmes
- Intercommunality: CC Mirecourt Dompaire

Government
  - Mayor (2020–2026): Julien Nageleisen
- Area^{1}: 4.44 km^{2} (1.71 sq mi)
- Elevation: 413 m (1,355 ft)
- Highest elevation: 442 m (1,450 ft)
- Lowest elevation: 332 m (1,089 ft)
- Population (2023): 100
  - Density: 23/km^{2} (58/sq mi)
- Time zone: UTC+01:00 (CET)
  - Summer (DST): UTC+02:00 (CEST)
- INSEE/Postal code: 88437 /88270
- ^{1} French Land Register data, which excludes lakes, ponds, glaciers > 1 km^{2} (0.386 sq mi or 247 acres) and river estuaries.

Saint-Vallier (French pronunciation: [sɛ̃ valje]) is a commune in the Vosges department in Grand Est in northeastern France.

== See also ==
- Communes of the Vosges department
