= Bouzemont =

- Commune
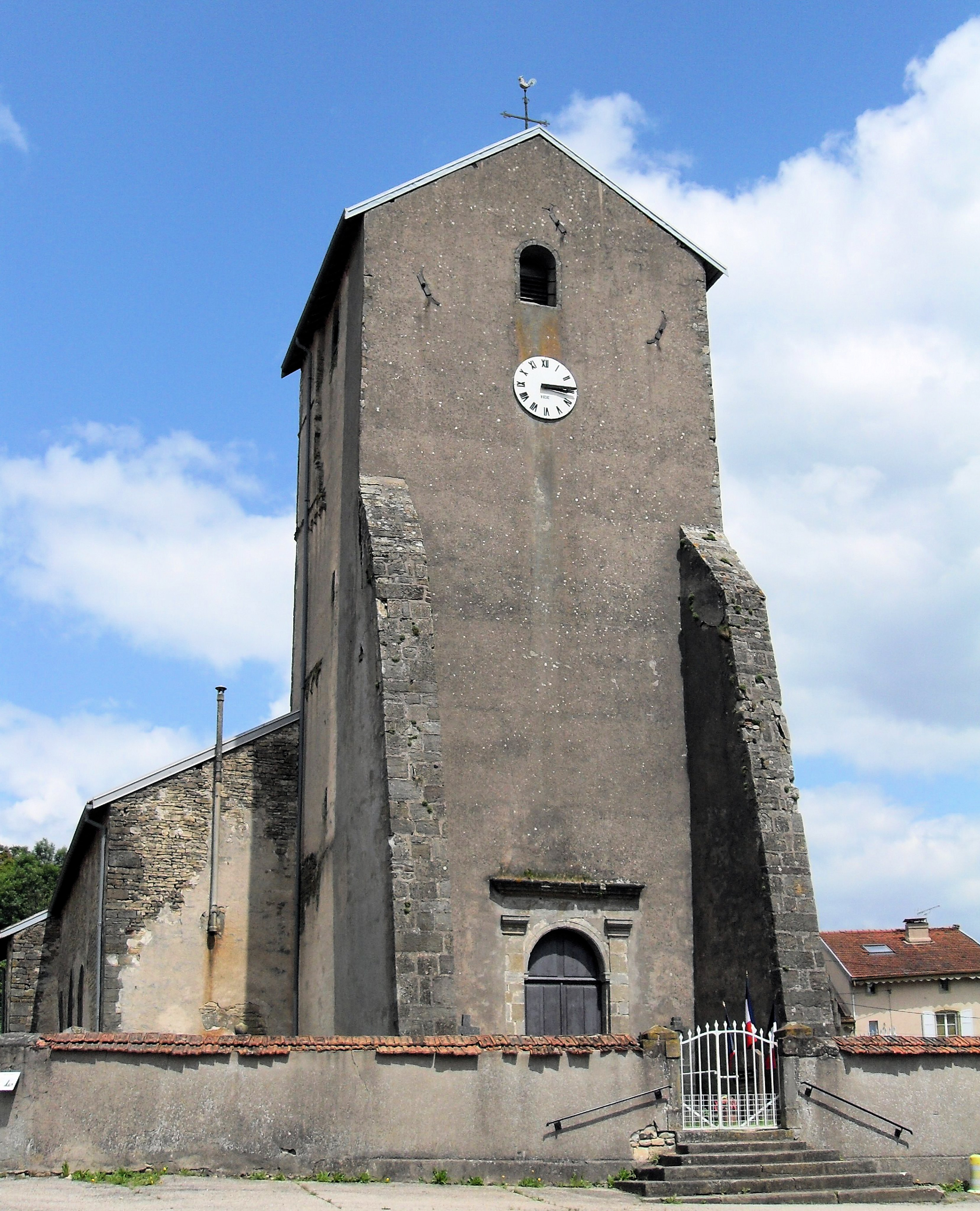
- The church in Bouzemont
- Location of Bouzemont
- Location within France Location within Grand Est
- Coordinates: 48°14′59″N 6°14′10″E
- Country: France
- Region: Grand Est
- Department: Vosges
- Arrondissement: Neufchâteau
- Canton: Darney
- Intercommunality: CC Mirecourt Dompaire

Government
  - Mayor (2020–2026): Laure Thouvenin de Villaret
- Area^{1}: 4.97 km^{2} (1.92 sq mi)
- Highest elevation: 413 m (1,355 ft)
- Lowest elevation: 297 m (974 ft)
- Population (2023): 44
  - Density: 8.9/km^{2} (23/sq mi)
- Time zone: UTC+01:00 (CET)
  - Summer (DST): UTC+02:00 (CEST)
- INSEE/Postal code: 88071 /88270
- ^{1} French Land Register data, which excludes lakes, ponds, glaciers > 1 km^{2} (0.386 sq mi or 247 acres) and river estuaries.

Bouzemont (French pronunciation: [buzmɔ̃]) is a commune in the Vosges department in Grand Est in northeastern France.

== See also ==
- Communes of the Vosges department
