= Damas-et-Bettegney =

- Commune
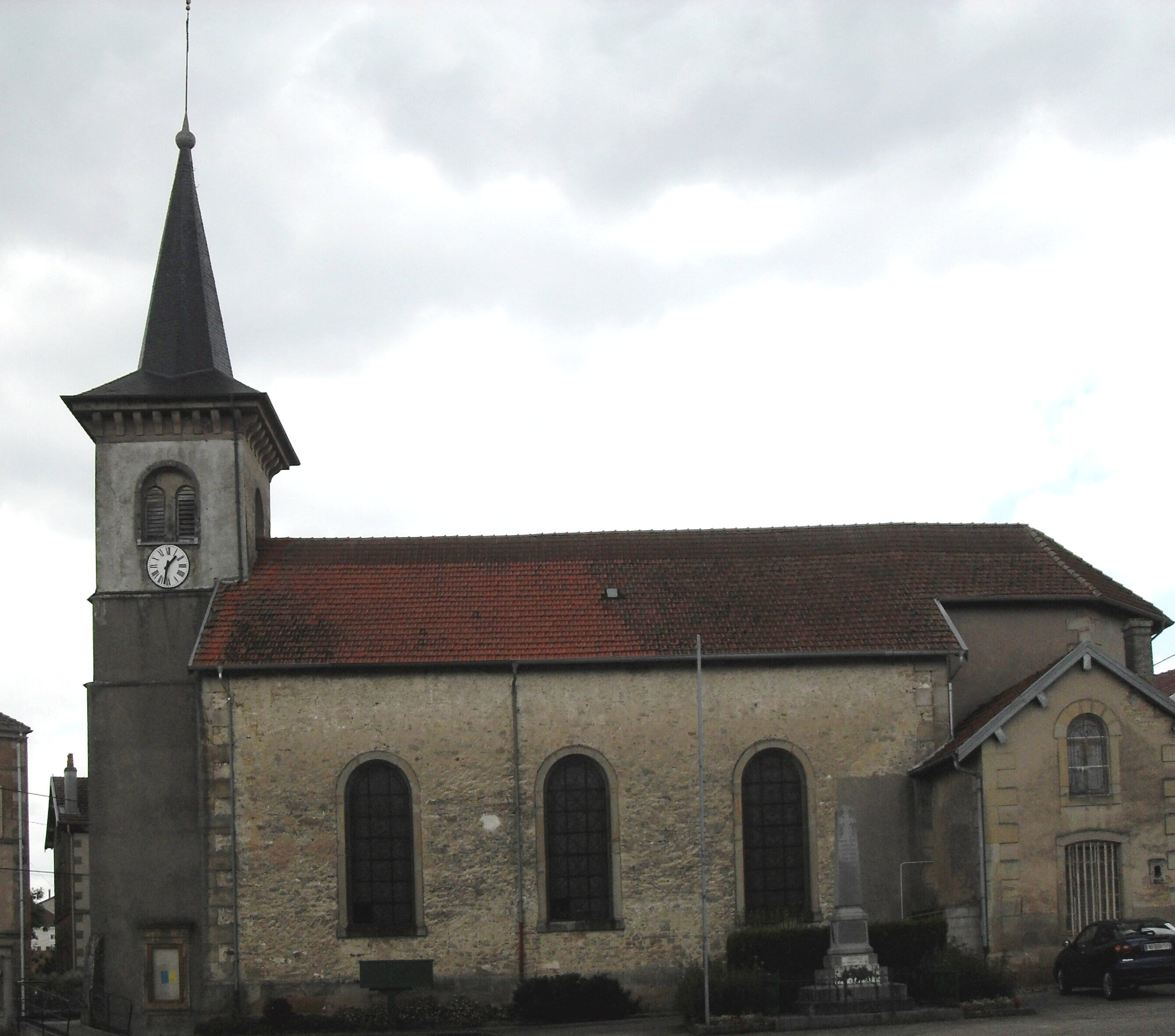
- The church in Damas-et-Bettegney
- Location of Damas-et-Bettegney
- Location within France Location within Grand Est
- Coordinates: 48°12′38″N 6°15′50″E
- Country: France
- Region: Grand Est
- Department: Vosges
- Arrondissement: Neufchâteau
- Canton: Darney
- Intercommunality: CC Mirecourt Dompaire

Government
  - Mayor (2020–2026): Claude Maire
- Area^{1}: 15.07 km^{2} (5.82 sq mi)
- Elevation: 304 m (997 ft)
- Highest elevation: 425 m (1,394 ft)
- Lowest elevation: 296 m (971 ft)
- Population (2023): 390
  - Density: 26/km^{2} (67/sq mi)
- Time zone: UTC+01:00 (CET)
  - Summer (DST): UTC+02:00 (CEST)
- INSEE/Postal code: 88122 /88270
- ^{1} French Land Register data, which excludes lakes, ponds, glaciers > 1 km^{2} (0.386 sq mi or 247 acres) and river estuaries.

Damas-et-Bettegney (French pronunciation: [dama e bɛtɲɛ]) is a commune in the Vosges department in Grand Est in northeastern France.

== See also ==
- Communes of the Vosges department
