= Bazegney =

- Commune
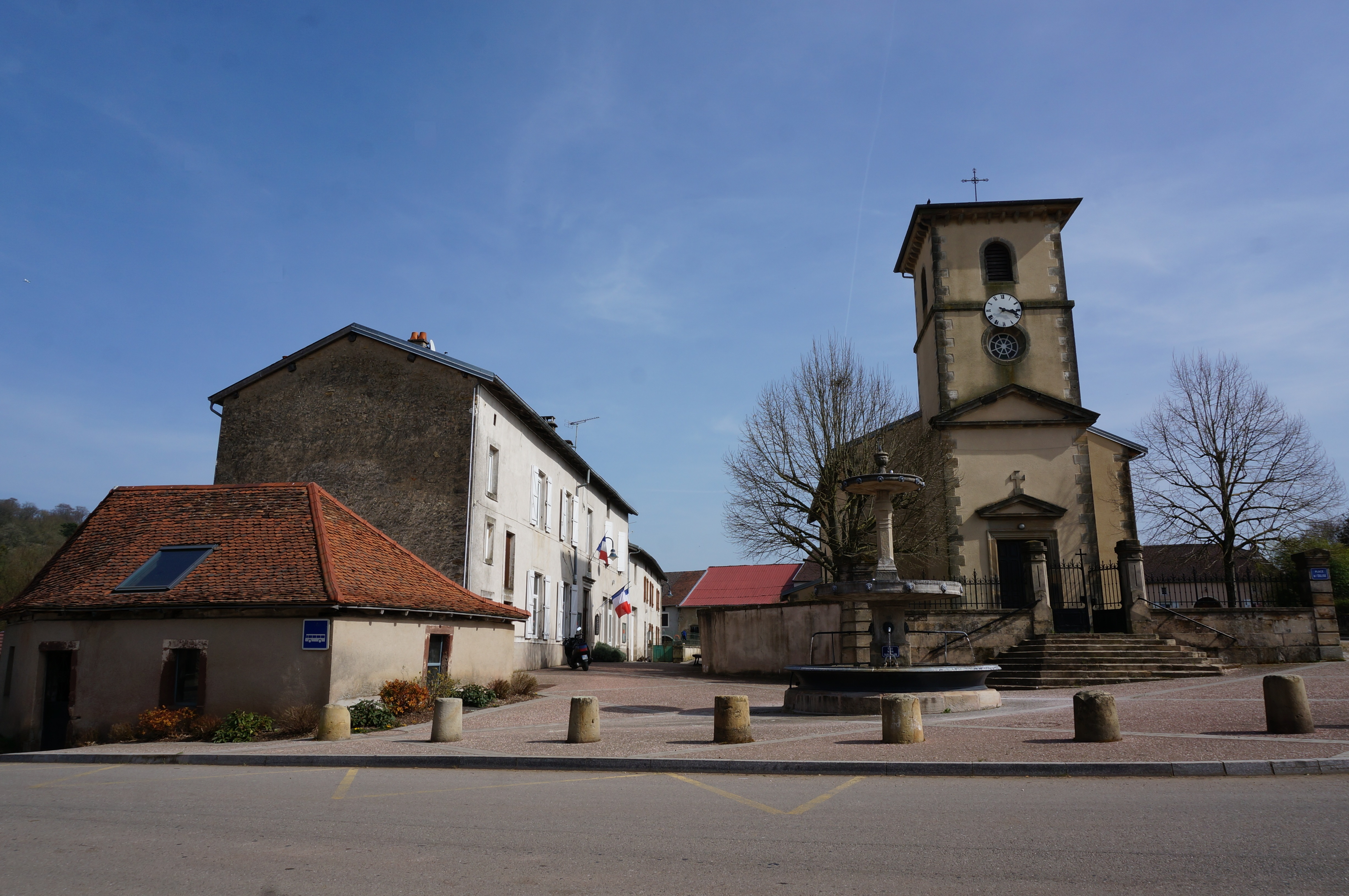
- The church, fountain and wash house in Bazegney
- Location of Bazegney
- Location within France Location within Grand Est
- Coordinates: 48°16′02″N 6°13′37″E
- Country: France
- Region: Grand Est
- Department: Vosges
- Arrondissement: Neufchâteau
- Canton: Darney
- Intercommunality: CC Mirecourt Dompaire

Government
  - Mayor (2020–2026): Serge Lhôte
- Area^{1}: 5.81 km^{2} (2.24 sq mi)
- Elevation: 305 m (1,001 ft)
- Highest elevation: 390 m (1,280 ft)
- Lowest elevation: 280 m (920 ft)
- Population (2023): 95
  - Density: 16/km^{2} (42/sq mi)
- Time zone: UTC+01:00 (CET)
  - Summer (DST): UTC+02:00 (CEST)
- INSEE/Postal code: 88041 /88270
- ^{1} French Land Register data, which excludes lakes, ponds, glaciers > 1 km^{2} (0.386 sq mi or 247 acres) and river estuaries.

Bazegney (French pronunciation: [bazɲɛ]) is a commune in the Vosges department in Grand Est in northeastern France.

== See also ==
- Communes of the Vosges department
