= Harol =

- Commune
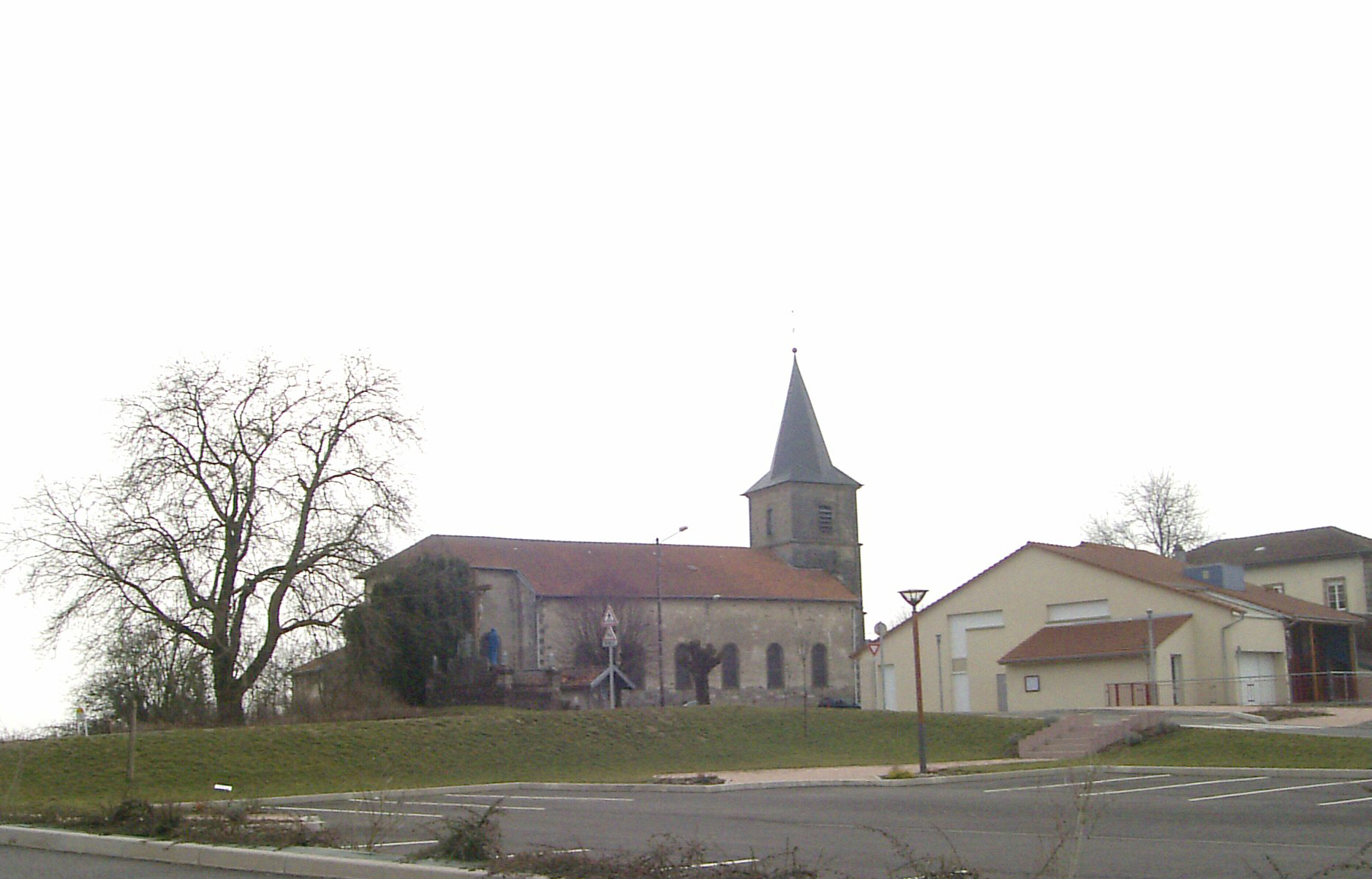
- Church of Saint-Epvre and school

- Coat of arms
- Location of Harol
- Location within France Location within Grand Est
- Coordinates: 48°09′10″N 6°14′53″E
- Country: France
- Region: Grand Est
- Department: Vosges
- Arrondissement: Neufchâteau
- Canton: Darney
- Intercommunality: CC Mirecourt Dompaire

Government
  - Mayor (2020–2026): Gérard Aubry
- Area^{1}: 27.34 km^{2} (10.56 sq mi)
- Elevation: 400 m (1,300 ft)
- Highest elevation: 428 m (1,404 ft)
- Lowest elevation: 311 m (1,020 ft)
- Population (2023): 614
  - Density: 22.5/km^{2} (58.2/sq mi)
- Time zone: UTC+01:00 (CET)
  - Summer (DST): UTC+02:00 (CEST)
- INSEE/Postal code: 88233 /88270
- ^{1} French Land Register data, which excludes lakes, ponds, glaciers > 1 km^{2} (0.386 sq mi or 247 acres) and river estuaries.

Harol (French pronunciation: [aʁɔl]) is a commune in the Vosges department in Grand Est in northeastern France.

== See also ==
- Communes of the Vosges department
