= Gelvécourt-et-Adompt =

- Commune
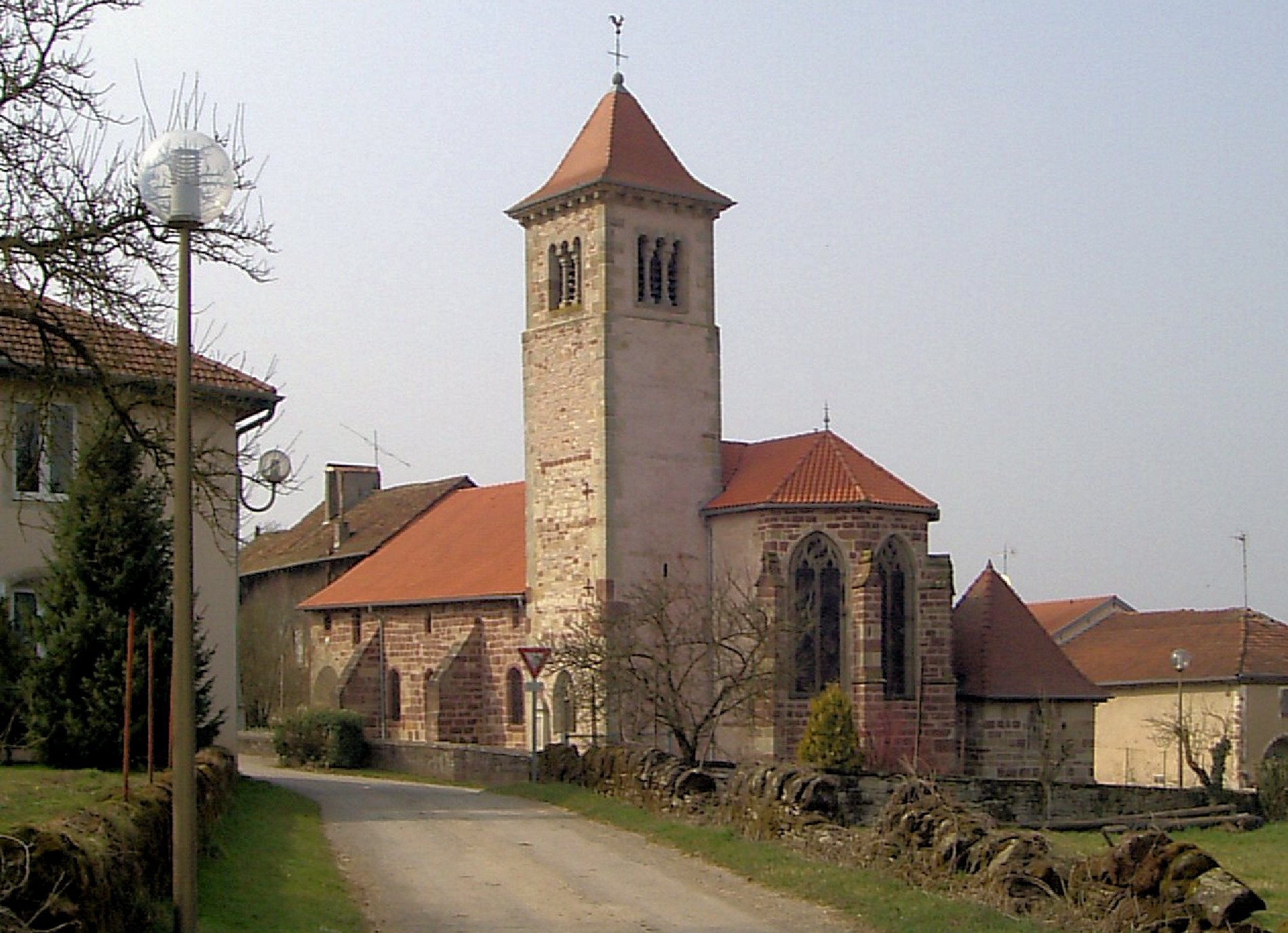
- Church of Saint-Martin

- Coat of arms
- Location of Gelvécourt-et-Adompt
- Location within France Location within Grand Est
- Coordinates: 48°12′03″N 6°10′03″E
- Country: France
- Region: Grand Est
- Department: Vosges
- Arrondissement: Neufchâteau
- Canton: Darney
- Intercommunality: CC Mirecourt Dompaire

Government
  - Mayor (2020–2026): Marc Guiller
- Area^{1}: 3.94 km^{2} (1.52 sq mi)
- Elevation: 310 m (1,020 ft)
- Highest elevation: 381 m (1,250 ft)
- Lowest elevation: 289 m (948 ft)
- Population (2023): 108
  - Density: 27.4/km^{2} (71.0/sq mi)
- Time zone: UTC+01:00 (CET)
  - Summer (DST): UTC+02:00 (CEST)
- INSEE/Postal code: 88192 /88270
- ^{1} French Land Register data, which excludes lakes, ponds, glaciers > 1 km^{2} (0.386 sq mi or 247 acres) and river estuaries.

Gelvécourt-et-Adompt (French pronunciation: [ʒɛlvekuʁ e adɔ̃]) is a commune in the Vosges department in Grand Est in northeastern France.

== See also ==
- Communes of the Vosges department
