= Racécourt =

- Commune
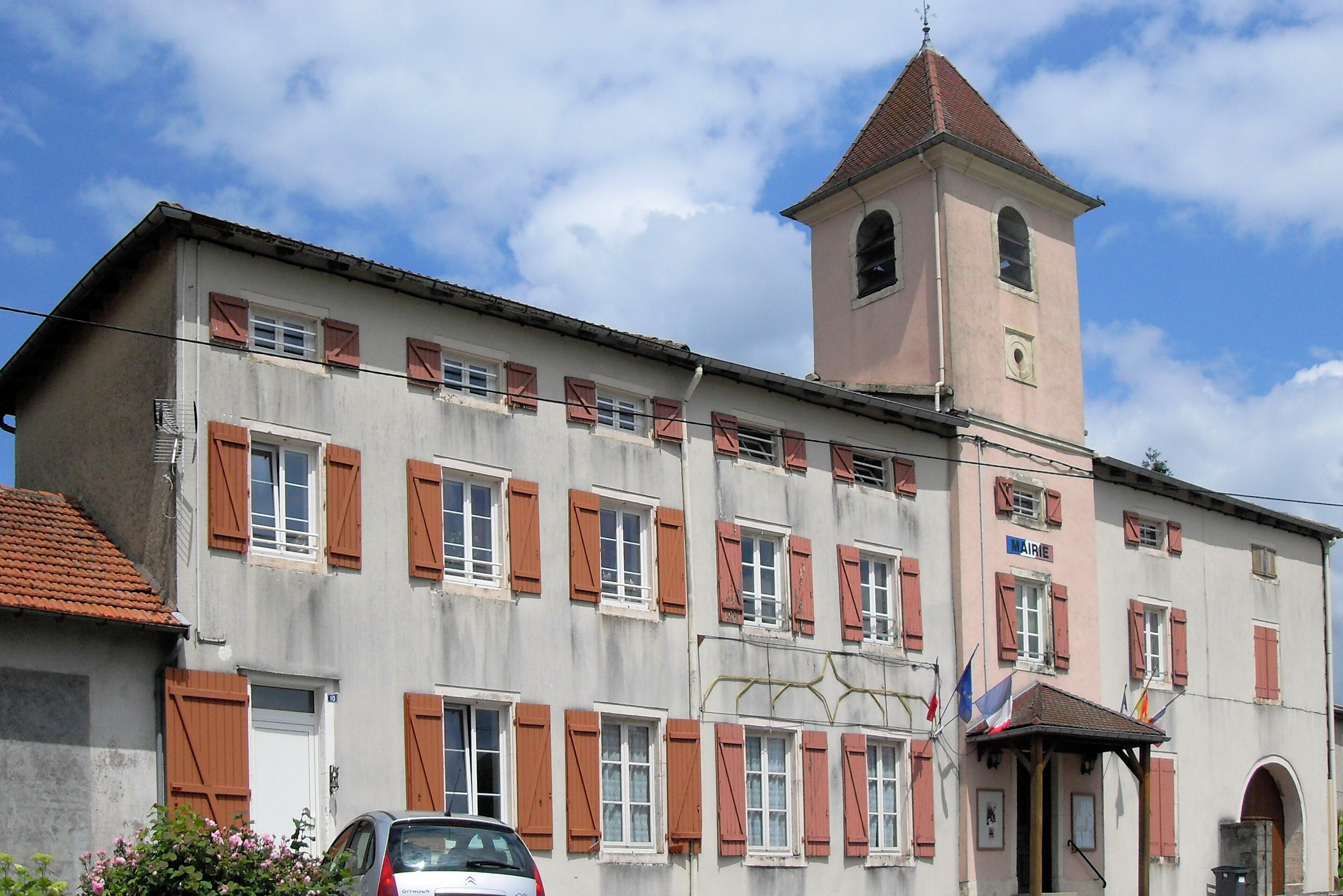
- The town hall in Racécourt
- Location of Racécourt
- Location within France Location within Grand Est
- Coordinates: 48°15′30″N 6°11′23″E
- Country: France
- Region: Grand Est
- Department: Vosges
- Arrondissement: Neufchâteau
- Canton: Darney
- Intercommunality: Mirecourt Dompaire

Government
  - Mayor (2020–2026): Joachim Franqueville
- Area^{1}: 7.23 km^{2} (2.79 sq mi)
- Elevation: 282 m (925 ft)
- Highest elevation: 366 m (1,201 ft)
- Lowest elevation: 275 m (902 ft)
- Population (2023): 143
  - Density: 19.8/km^{2} (51.2/sq mi)
- Time zone: UTC+01:00 (CET)
  - Summer (DST): UTC+02:00 (CEST)
- INSEE/Postal code: 88365 /88270
- ^{1} French Land Register data, which excludes lakes, ponds, glaciers > 1 km^{2} (0.386 sq mi or 247 acres) and river estuaries.

Racécourt (French pronunciation: [ʁasekuʁ]) is a commune in the Vosges department in Grand Est in northeastern France.

== Population ==
Inhabitants are called Racécurtiens in French.

Historical population
Year	Pop.	±% p.a.
1968	148	—
1975	135	−1.30%
1982	120	−1.67%
1990	156	+3.33%
1999	151	−0.36%
2007	147	−0.34%
2012	160	+1.71%
2017	171	+1.34%
2023	143	−2.94%
Source: INSEE

== Geography ==
The village lies 6 kilometres (4 mi) to the north of Dompaire and 26 kilometres (16 mi) to the west of Épinal. Nancy is 60 kilometres (37 mi) to the north.

== See also ==
- Communes of the Vosges department
