= Ahéville =

- Commune
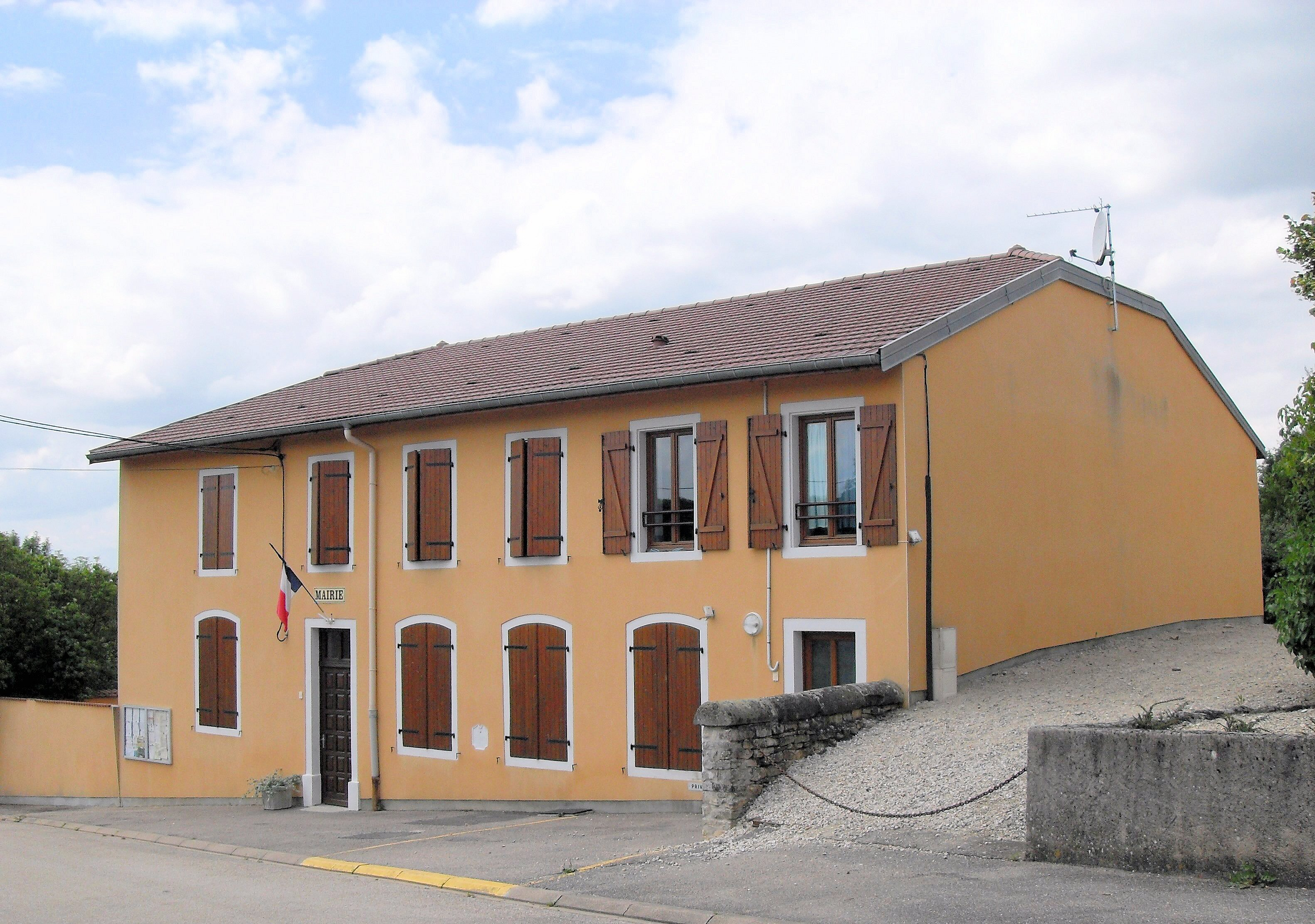
- The town hall in Ahéville

- Coat of arms
- Location of Ahéville
- Location within France Location within Grand Est
- Coordinates: 48°17′10″N 6°11′35″E
- Country: France
- Region: Grand Est
- Department: Vosges
- Arrondissement: Neufchâteau
- Canton: Darney
- Intercommunality: Mirecourt Dompaire

Government
  - Mayor (2020–2026): Véronique Muniere
- Area^{1}: 5.84 km^{2} (2.25 sq mi)
- Elevation: 339 m (1,112 ft)
- Highest elevation: 401 m (1,316 ft)
- Lowest elevation: 308 m (1,010 ft)
- Population (2023): 67
  - Density: 11/km^{2} (30/sq mi)
- Time zone: UTC+01:00 (CET)
  - Summer (DST): UTC+02:00 (CEST)
- INSEE/Postal code: 88002 /88500
- ^{1} French Land Register data, which excludes lakes, ponds, glaciers > 1 km^{2} (0.386 sq mi or 247 acres) and river estuaries.

Ahéville (French pronunciation: [a.evil]) is a commune in the Vosges department in Grand Est in northeastern France.

== Population ==
Historical population
Year	Pop.	±% p.a.
1968	86	—
1975	80	−1.03%
1982	59	−4.26%
1990	74	+2.87%
1999	67	−1.10%
2007	63	−0.77%
2012	57	−1.98%
2017	69	+3.90%
2023	67	−0.49%
Source: INSEE

== See also ==
- Communes of the Vosges department
