= Gorhey =

- Commune
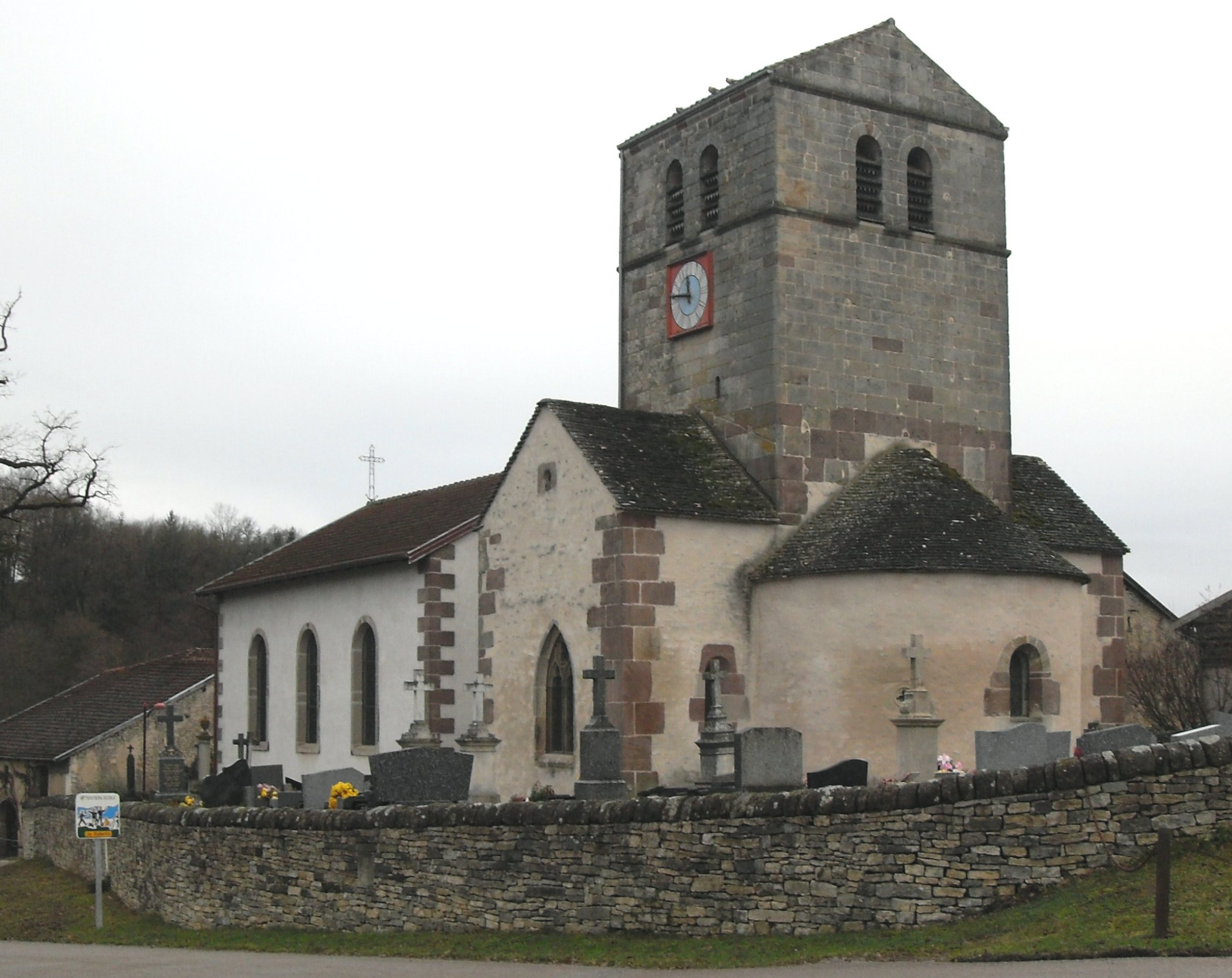
- The church in Gorhey
- Location of Gorhey
- Location within France Location within Grand Est
- Coordinates: 48°11′45″N 6°17′05″E
- Country: France
- Region: Grand Est
- Department: Vosges
- Arrondissement: Neufchâteau
- Canton: Darney
- Intercommunality: CC Mirecourt Dompaire

Government
  - Mayor (2020–2026): Isabelle Laurent
- Area^{1}: 6.31 km^{2} (2.44 sq mi)
- Highest elevation: 404 m (1,325 ft)
- Lowest elevation: 313 m (1,027 ft)
- Population (2023): 174
  - Density: 27.6/km^{2} (71.4/sq mi)
- Time zone: UTC+01:00 (CET)
  - Summer (DST): UTC+02:00 (CEST)
- INSEE/Postal code: 88210 /88270
- ^{1} French Land Register data, which excludes lakes, ponds, glaciers > 1 km^{2} (0.386 sq mi or 247 acres) and river estuaries.

Gorhey (French pronunciation: [ɡɔʁɛ]) is a commune in the Vosges department in Grand Est in northeastern France. As of 2015, the population of Gorhey was 180.

== See also ==
- Communes of the Vosges department
