= Communauté de communes du Bassin de Neufchâteau =

The Communauté de communes du Bassin de Neufchâteau is a former administrative association of mostly rural communes in the Vosges département of eastern France and in the region of Lorraine. It was merged into the new Communauté de communes de l'Ouest Vosgien in January 2017.

Created in November 2012, the community of communes had its administrative offices at Neufchâteau. It had a population of 17,700 inhabitants.

== Composition ==
The Communauté de communes comprised the following communes:

- Neufchâteau
- Avranville
- Autreville
- Autigny-la-Tour
- Bazoilles-sur-Meuse
- Brechainville
- Certilleux
- Circourt-sur-Mouzon
- Chermisey
- Clérey-la-Côte
- Coussey
- Domrémy-la-Pucelle
- Fréville
- Frebécourt
- Grand
- Greux
- Harmonville
- Jubainville
- Jainvillotte
- Landaville
- Lemmecourt
- Liffol-le-Petit
- Liffol-le-Grand
- Martigny-les-Gerbonvaux
- Maxey-sur-Meuse
- Mont-lès-Neufchâteau
- Midrevaux
- Moncel-sur-Vair
- Pargny-sous-Mureau
- Punerot
- Pompierre
- Rebeuville
- Rollainville
- Ruppes
- Seraumont
- Soulosse-sous-Saint-Élophe
- Sionne
- Sartes
- Tilleux
- Tranqueville-Graux
- Trampot
- Villouxel

== History ==
Since 15 December 2012, the Community of Communes of the Neufchâteau Region includes 42 municipalities and towns. It is the result of the merger of three old communities of communes (Pays de Neufchâteau / Pays de Jeanne / Pays des Côtes et de la Ruppe)

== Responsibilities ==
The objective of the Community of Communes of the Neufchâteau Region is to pursue shared objectives and pool administrative resources in respect of the following policy areas:

- Management of public spaces
- Economic development
- Environment
- "Quality of life" policy
- Tourism development
- Infrastructure development
- Culture, sport and school equipments
- Early childhood supervision
- Creation of a geographical information system (GIS)
- Creation of onshore wind farm development areas
