= Canton of Coussey =

Coordinates: 48°24′33″N 5°40′10″E

Coussey
- Former canton
- Interactive map of Coussey
- Country: France
- Region: Grand Est
- Department: Vosges
- No. of communes: {{{nbcomm}}}
- Disbanded: 2015
- Area: 233.76 km^{2} (90.26 sq mi)
- Population (2012): 4,209
  - Density: 18.01/km^{2} (46.63/sq mi)

The Canton of Coussey is a former French administrative and electoral grouping of communes in the Vosges département of eastern France and in the region of Lorraine. It was disbanded following the French canton reorganisation which came into effect in March 2015. It consisted of 21 communes, which joined the canton of Neufchâteau in 2015. It had 4,209 inhabitants (2012).

The Canton of Coussey had its administrative centre at Coussey and was one of seven cantons in the Arrondissement of Neufchâteau. The territory of the canton included Joan of Arc's birthplace Domrémy-la-Pucelle.

== Composition ==
The Canton of Coussey comprises the following 21 communes: Coussey, Soulosse-sous-Saint-Élophe, Frebécourt, Maxey-sur-Meuse, Moncel-sur-Vair, Midrevaux, Harmonville, Domrémy-la-Pucelle, Autigny-la-Tour, Greux, Punerot, Ruppes, Martigny-les-Gerbonvaux, Autreville, Sionne, Chermisey, Tranqueville-Graux, Avranville, Jubainville, Clérey-la-Côte and Seraumont.
