= Communauté de communes du Pays de Jeanne =

The Communauté de communes du Pays de Jeanne is a former administrative association of communes in the Vosges department of eastern France and in the region of Lorraine.

The grouping is named after Joan of Arc, who was born at Domrémy-la-Pucelle around 1412, and who has been an iconic figure in France ever since her popular rediscovery as part of the surge in nationalism that France, along with most of the rest of Europe, experienced during the nineteenth and twentieth centuries.

Created in December 1998, the association had its administrative offices at Coussey. It was merged into the new Communauté de communes du Bassin de Neufchâteau in January 2013.

== Member communes ==
The Communauté de communes comprised the following communes:

- Autigny-la-Tour
- Avranville
- Chermisey
- Coussey
- Domrémy-la-Pucelle
- Frebécourt
- Midrevaux
- Seraumont
- Sionne
- Soulosse-sous-Saint-Élophe
