= Communauté de communes des Côtes et de la Ruppe =

Coordinates: 48.4829°N 5.7562°E

les Côtes et la Ruppe
- Former communauté de communes
- Interactive map of les Côtes et la Ruppe
- Country: France
- Region: Grand Est
- Department: Vosges
- No. of communes: {{{nbcomm}}}
- Established: 1997
- Disbanded: 2013
- Population (1999): 885

The communauté de communes des Côtes et de la Ruppe is a former communauté de communes in the Vosges département and in the Lorraine regionion of France.

Established on 24 December 1997, the association had its administrative offices at Martigny-les-Gerbonvaux. It was merged into the new Communauté de communes du Bassin de Neufchâteau in January 2013.

The Communauté de communes comprised the following communes:

- Autreville
- Clérey-la-Côte
- Harmonville
- Jubainville
- Martigny-les-Gerbonvaux
- Punerot
- Ruppes
- Tranqueville-Graux
