= Attignéville =

- Commune
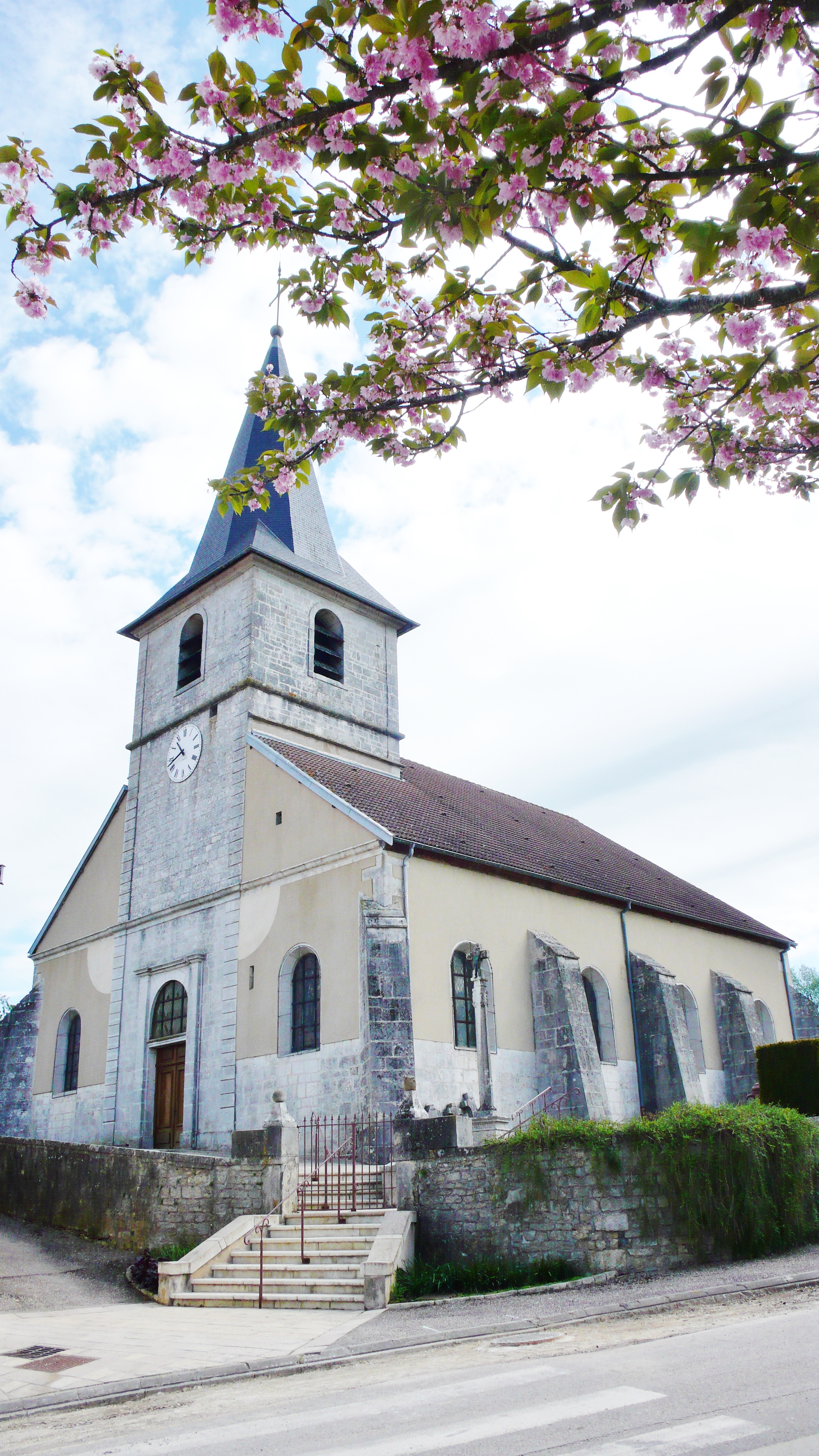
- The church in Attignéville
- Location of Attignéville
- Location within France Location within Grand Est
- Coordinates: 48°23′12″N 5°48′31″E
- Country: France
- Region: Grand Est
- Department: Vosges
- Arrondissement: Neufchâteau
- Canton: Neufchâteau
- Intercommunality: CC Ouest Vosgien

Government
  - Mayor (2020–2026): Frédéric Poirette
- Area^{1}: 14.61 km^{2} (5.64 sq mi)
- Elevation: 302 m (991 ft)
- Highest elevation: 450 m (1,480 ft)
- Lowest elevation: 295 m (968 ft)
- Population (2023): 219
  - Density: 15.0/km^{2} (38.8/sq mi)
- Time zone: UTC+01:00 (CET)
  - Summer (DST): UTC+02:00 (CEST)
- INSEE/Postal code: 88015 /88300
- ^{1} French Land Register data, which excludes lakes, ponds, glaciers > 1 km^{2} (0.386 sq mi or 247 acres) and river estuaries.

Attignéville (French pronunciation: [atiɲevil]) is a commune in the Vosges department in Grand Est in northeastern France.

== See also ==
- Communes of the Vosges department
