= Harchéchamp =

- Commune
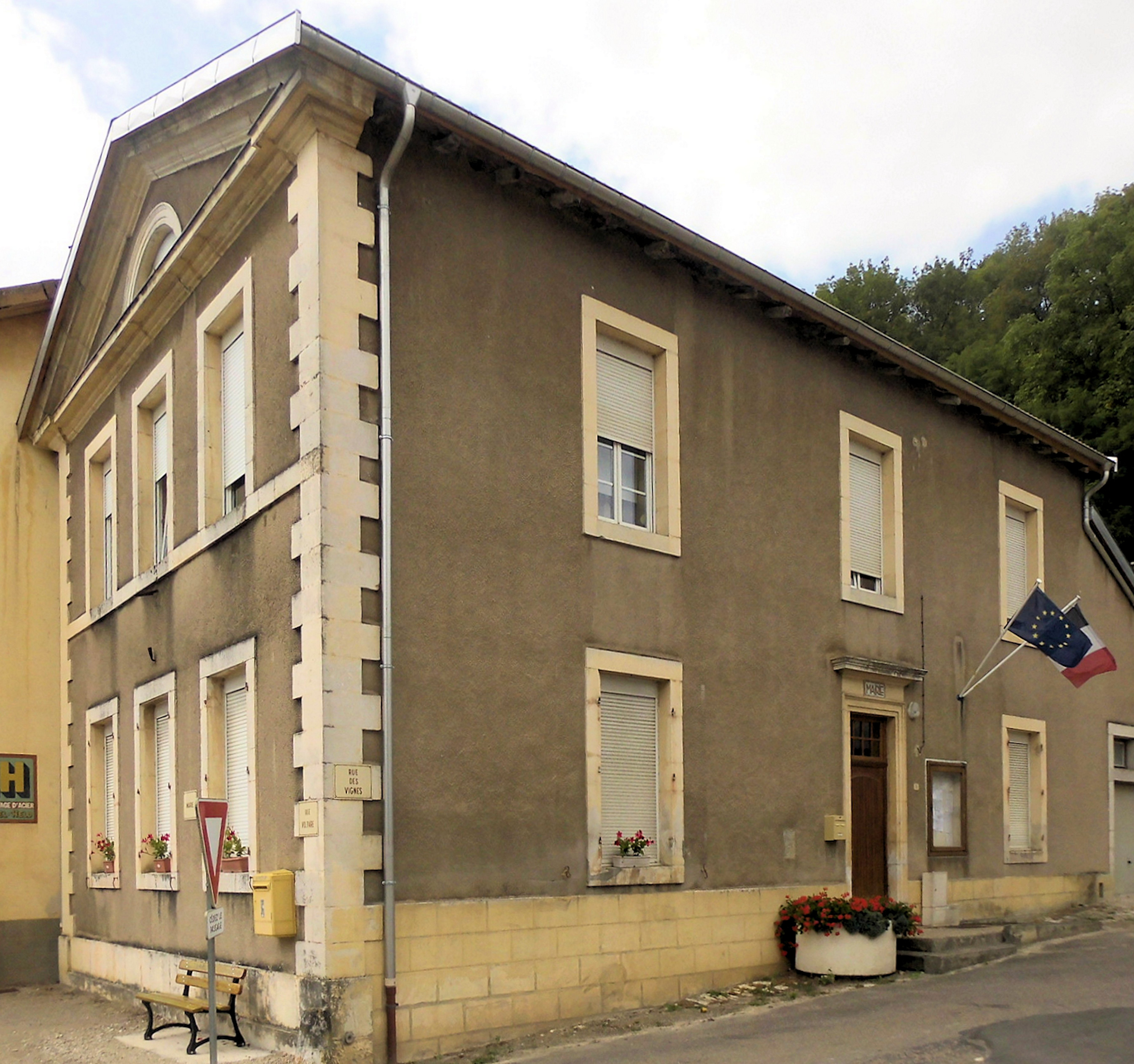
- The town hall in Harchéchamp
- Location of Harchéchamp
- Location within France Location within Grand Est
- Coordinates: 48°23′12″N 5°46′38″E
- Country: France
- Region: Grand Est
- Department: Vosges
- Arrondissement: Neufchâteau
- Canton: Neufchâteau
- Intercommunality: CC l'Ouest Vosgien

Government
  - Mayor (2020–2026): Thierry Calin
- Area^{1}: 7.41 km^{2} (2.86 sq mi)
- Elevation: 310 m (1,020 ft)
- Highest elevation: 421 m (1,381 ft)
- Lowest elevation: 290 m (950 ft)
- Population (2023): 87
  - Density: 12/km^{2} (30/sq mi)
- Time zone: UTC+01:00 (CET)
  - Summer (DST): UTC+02:00 (CEST)
- INSEE/Postal code: 88229 /88300
- ^{1} French Land Register data, which excludes lakes, ponds, glaciers > 1 km^{2} (0.386 sq mi or 247 acres) and river estuaries.

Harchéchamp (French pronunciation: [aʁʃeʃɑ̃]) is a commune in the Vosges department in Grand Est in northeastern France.

== See also ==
- Communes of the Vosges department
