= Pompierre =

- Commune
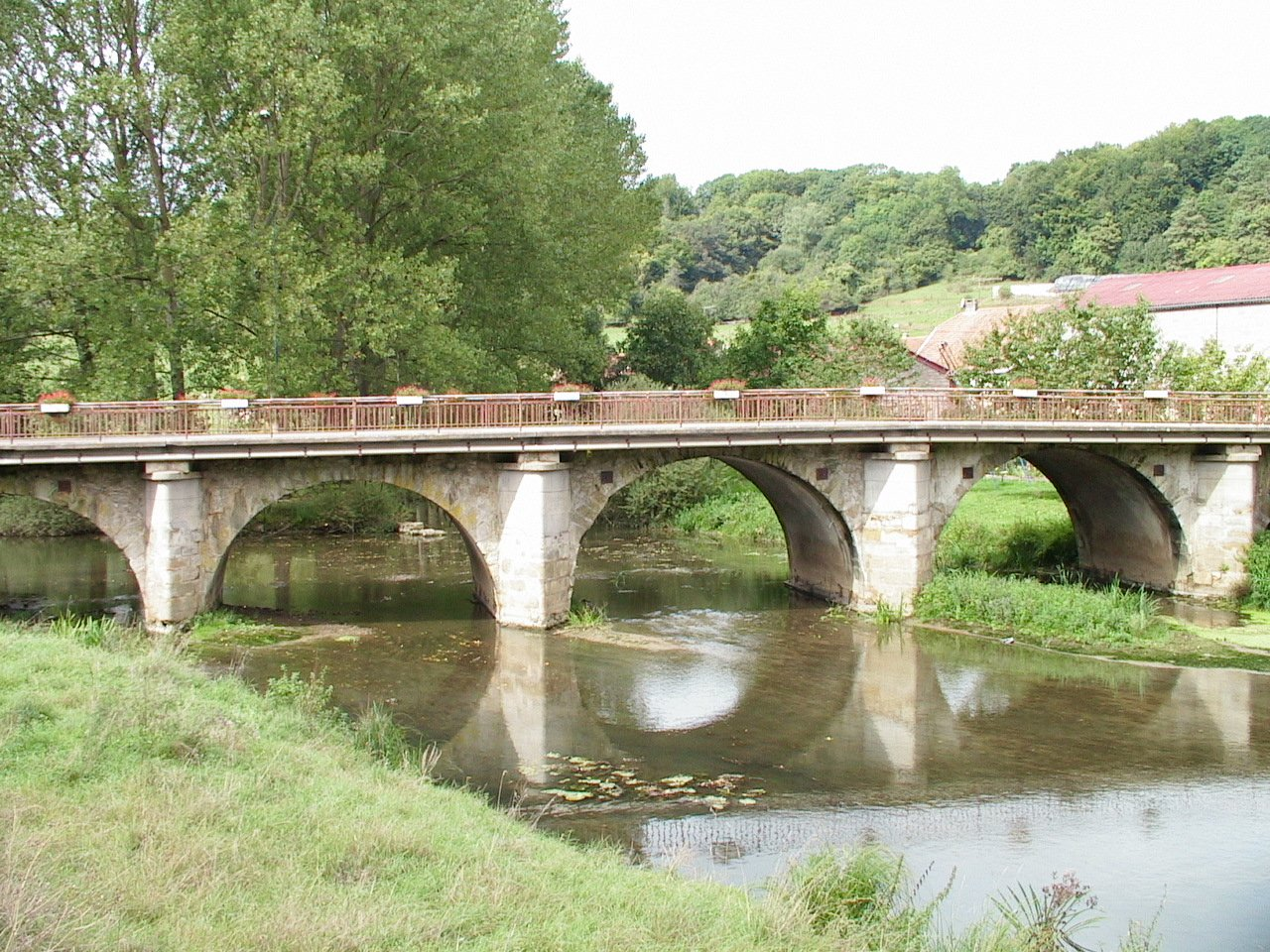
- The bridge over the Mouzon in Pompierre
- Location of Pompierre
- Location within France Location within Grand Est
- Coordinates: 48°15′41″N 5°40′25″E
- Country: France
- Region: Grand Est
- Department: Vosges
- Arrondissement: Neufchâteau
- Canton: Neufchâteau
- Intercommunality: CC Ouest Vosgien

Government
  - Mayor (2020–2026): Philippe Brissé
- Area^{1}: 12.42 km^{2} (4.80 sq mi)
- Elevation: 312 m (1,024 ft)
- Highest elevation: 445 m (1,460 ft)
- Lowest elevation: 303 m (994 ft)
- Population (2023): 187
  - Density: 15.1/km^{2} (39.0/sq mi)
- Time zone: UTC+01:00 (CET)
  - Summer (DST): UTC+02:00 (CEST)
- INSEE/Postal code: 88352 /88300
- ^{1} French Land Register data, which excludes lakes, ponds, glaciers > 1 km^{2} (0.386 sq mi or 247 acres) and river estuaries.

Pompierre (French pronunciation: [pɔ̃pjɛʁ]) is a commune in the Vosges department, Grand Est, Northeastern France.

== Geography ==
The village lies on the border with the adjacent Haute-Marne department 10 kilometres (6 mi) south of Neufchâteau and 13 kilometres (8 mi) across country from Robécourt which is the nearest access point for the A31, Lorraine's principal south-north highway.

Pompierre (formerly Pont de Pierre) is traversed by the Mouzon River which is here crossed by the bridge from which it takes its name.

== History ==
Situated on the line of a Roman road, the village gets its first mention in connection with a conflict between two grandsons of Clovis (himself often seen in France as the first French king). In 577 Saint Gontran, king of Burgundy clashed with Childebert, the king of Neustria at 'Pont de Pierre'. The event was commemorated with the construction of a chapel. The chapel was replaced in the twelfth century with a church which contains sculptures that recall the encounter between the two kings.

In 1741 Jean-Baptiste de Lavaulx, lord of Pompierre, Sartes, Courcelles and Dolaincourt ordered the construction of a castle which can still be seen today.

== See also ==
- Communes of the Vosges department
