= Rouvres-la-Chétive =

- Commune
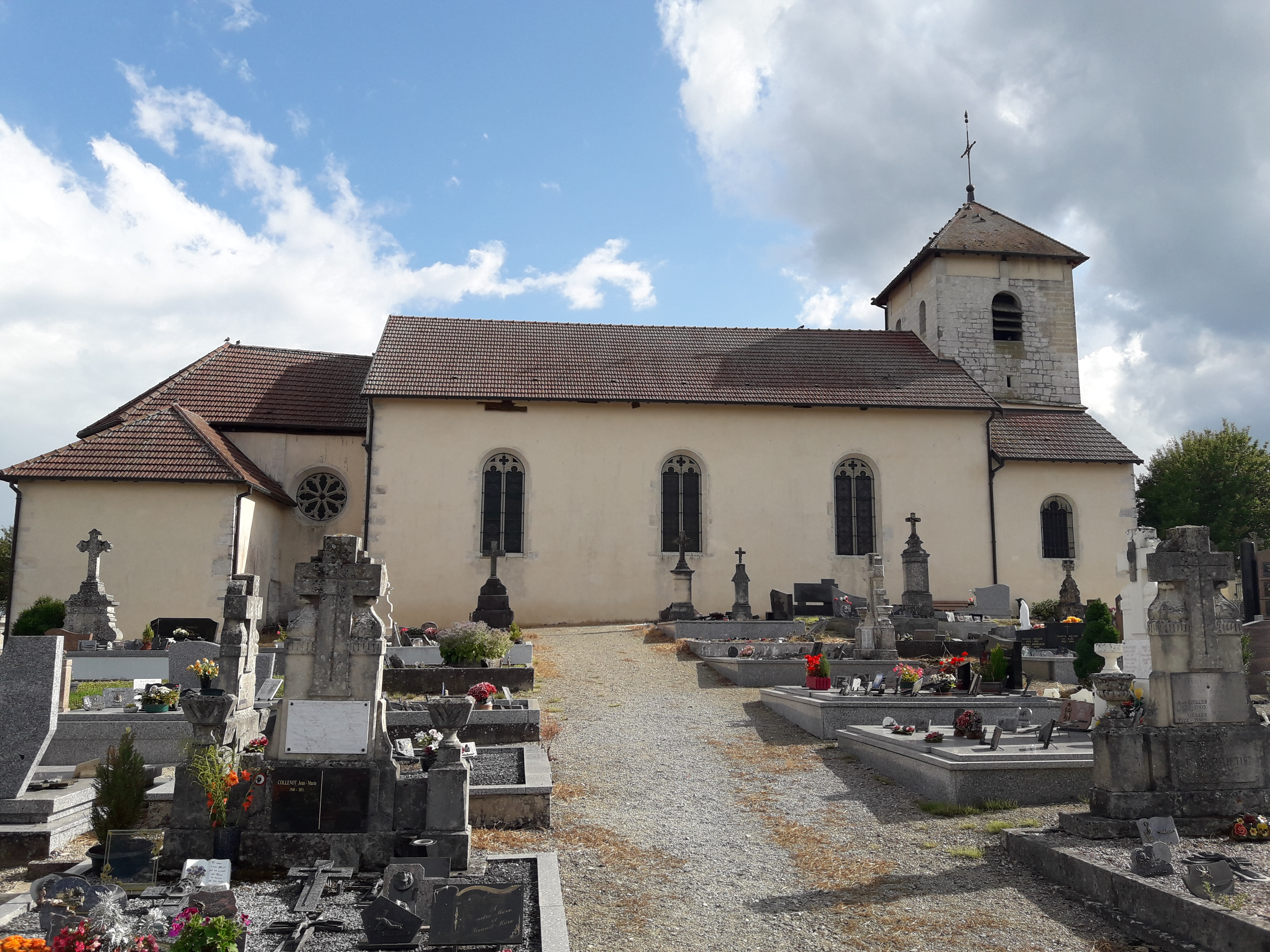
- The church in Rouvres-la-Chétive
- Location of Rouvres-la-Chétive
- Location within France Location within Grand Est
- Coordinates: 48°18′31″N 5°46′50″E
- Country: France
- Region: Grand Est
- Department: Vosges
- Arrondissement: Neufchâteau
- Canton: Neufchâteau
- Intercommunality: CC l'Ouest Vosgien

Government
  - Mayor (2020–2026): Jean Claude Marmeuse
- Area^{1}: 11.33 km^{2} (4.37 sq mi)
- Highest elevation: 483 m (1,585 ft)
- Lowest elevation: 345 m (1,132 ft)
- Population (2023): 468
  - Density: 41.3/km^{2} (107/sq mi)
- Time zone: UTC+01:00 (CET)
  - Summer (DST): UTC+02:00 (CEST)
- INSEE/Postal code: 88401 /88170
- ^{1} French Land Register data, which excludes lakes, ponds, glaciers > 1 km^{2} (0.386 sq mi or 247 acres) and river estuaries.

Rouvres-la-Chétive (French pronunciation: [ʁuvʁ la ʃetiv]) is a commune in the Vosges department in Grand Est in northeastern France.

== See also ==
- Communes of the Vosges department
