= Pargny-sous-Mureau =

- Commune
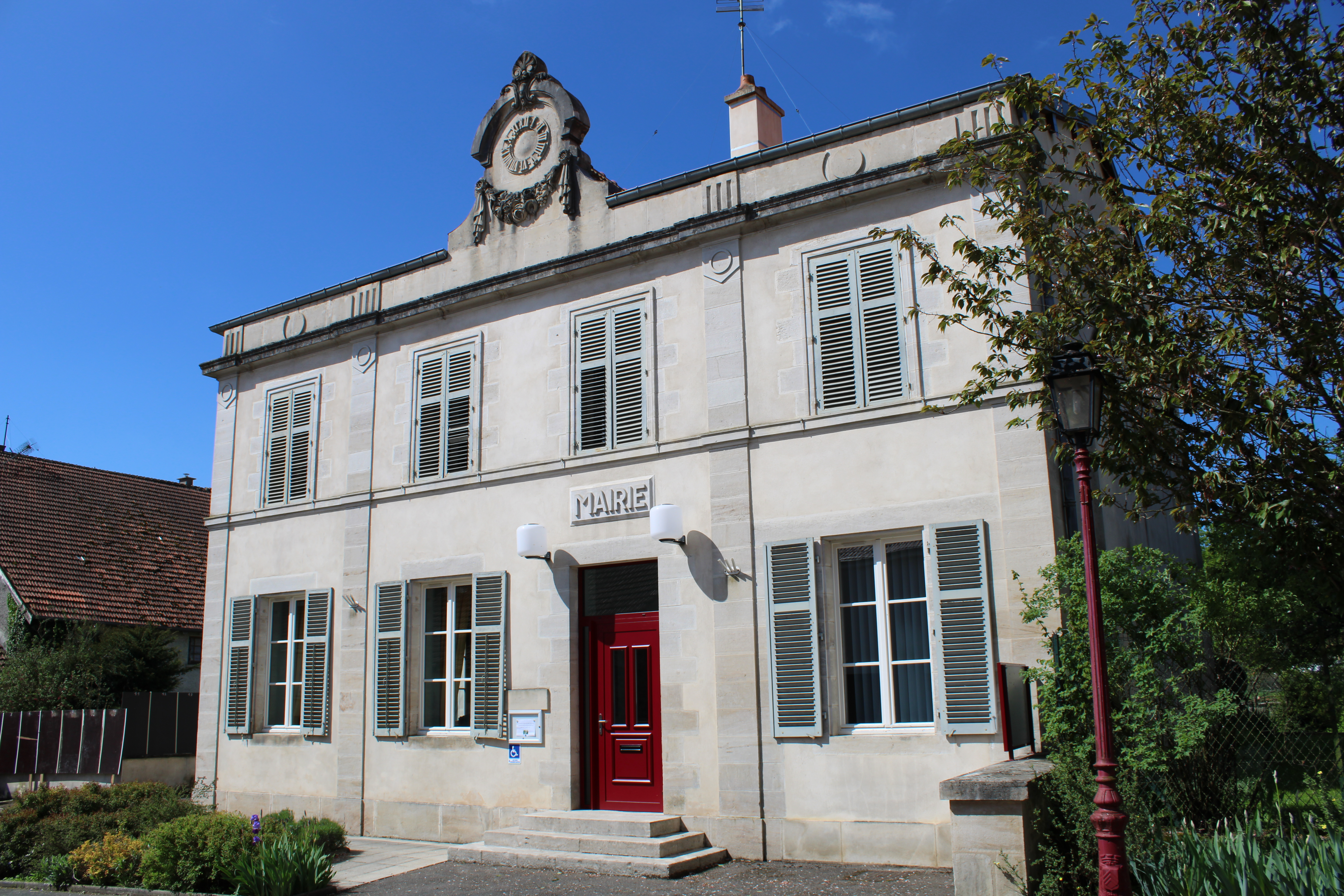
- The town hall in Pargny-sous-Mureau

- Coat of arms
- Location of Pargny-sous-Mureau
- Location within France Location within Grand Est
- Coordinates: 48°22′05″N 5°36′20″E
- Country: France
- Region: Grand Est
- Department: Vosges
- Arrondissement: Neufchâteau
- Canton: Neufchâteau
- Intercommunality: CC l'Ouest Vosgien

Government
  - Mayor (2020–2026): Hervé Bidal
- Area^{1}: 17.97 km^{2} (6.94 sq mi)
- Elevation: 300 m (980 ft)
- Highest elevation: 443 m (1,453 ft)
- Lowest elevation: 288 m (945 ft)
- Population (2023): 190
  - Density: 11/km^{2} (27/sq mi)
- Time zone: UTC+01:00 (CET)
  - Summer (DST): UTC+02:00 (CEST)
- INSEE/Postal code: 88344 /88350
- ^{1} French Land Register data, which excludes lakes, ponds, glaciers > 1 km^{2} (0.386 sq mi or 247 acres) and river estuaries.

Pargny-sous-Mureau (French pronunciation: [paʁɲi su myʁo]) is a commune in the Vosges department in Grand Est in northeastern France.

== Geography ==
The commune occupies the valley of the little River Saônelle, being positioned between Liffol-le-Grand et Coussey, near the western edge of the département.

== The abbey ==
The Premonstratensian Abbey was demolished in 1790, though a few pieces of walls and a porch survive, albeit in an increasingly bad condition.

A stream crosses the grounds of the former abbey, its water still channeled for a section, within a man-made tunnel.

== See also ==
- Communes of the Vosges department
