= Houéville =

- Commune
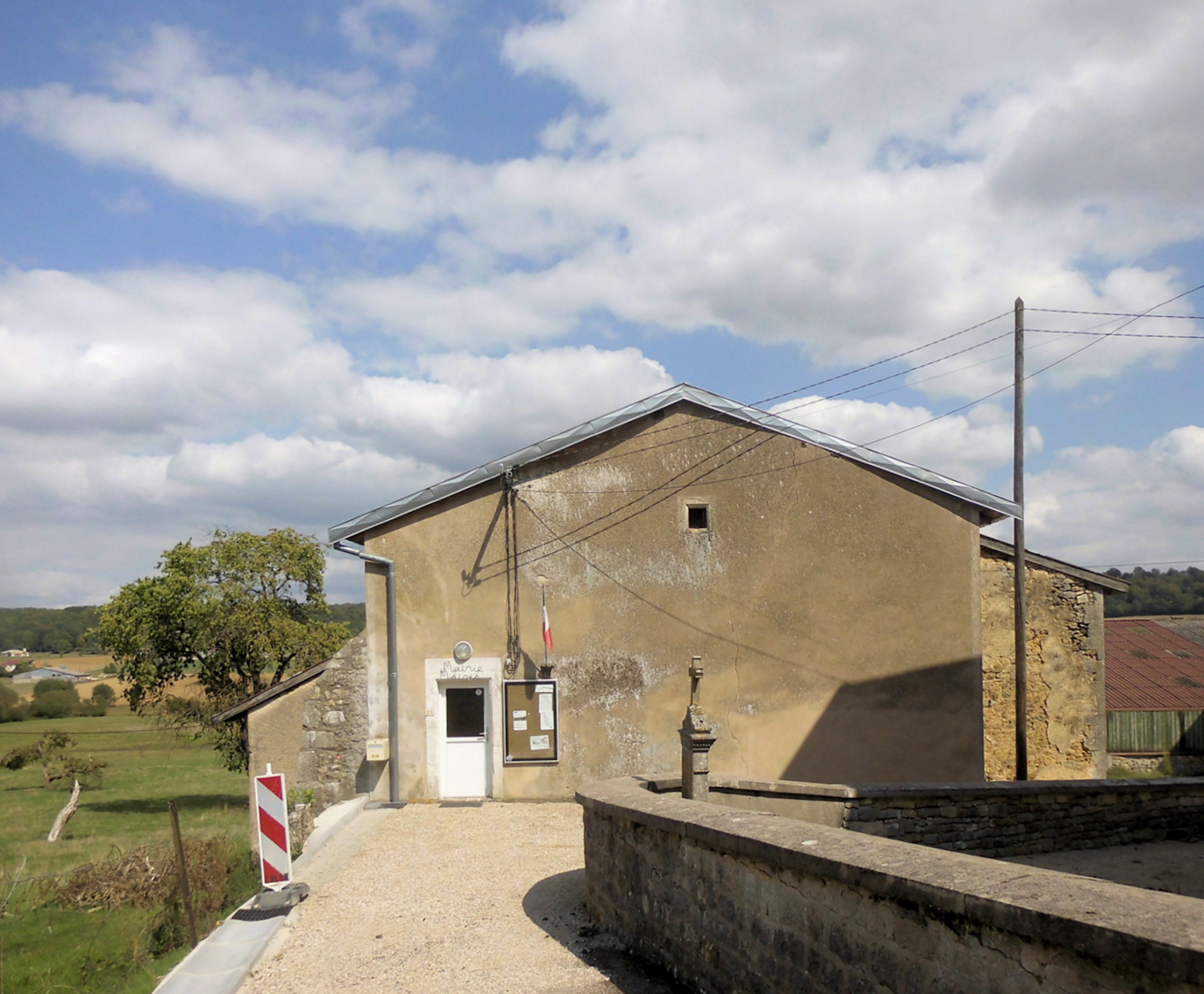
- The town hall in Houéville
- Location of Houéville
- Location within France Location within Grand Est
- Coordinates: 48°22′30″N 5°48′33″E
- Country: France
- Region: Grand Est
- Department: Vosges
- Arrondissement: Neufchâteau
- Canton: Neufchâteau
- Intercommunality: CC l'Ouest Vosgien

Government
  - Mayor (2020–2026): Damien Larges
- Area^{1}: 3.21 km^{2} (1.24 sq mi)
- Elevation: 310 m (1,020 ft)
- Highest elevation: 433 m (1,421 ft)
- Lowest elevation: 297 m (974 ft)
- Population (2023): 43
  - Density: 13/km^{2} (35/sq mi)
- Time zone: UTC+01:00 (CET)
  - Summer (DST): UTC+02:00 (CEST)
- INSEE/Postal code: 88242 /88300
- ^{1} French Land Register data, which excludes lakes, ponds, glaciers > 1 km^{2} (0.386 sq mi or 247 acres) and river estuaries.

Houéville (French pronunciation: [wevil]) is a commune in the Vosges department in Grand Est in northeastern France.

== See also ==
- Communes of the Vosges department
