= Communauté de communes de l'Ouest Vosgien =

Federation of municipalities in France

Ouest Vosgien
- Communauté de communes
- Interactive map of Ouest Vosgien
- Coordinates: 48°21′N 05°42′E
- Country: France
- Region: Grand Est
- Department: Haute-Marne, Vosges
- No. of communes: {{{nbcomm}}}
- Established: 2017
- Area: 728.5 km^{2} (281.3 sq mi)
- Population (2019): 23,270
  - Density: 31.94/km^{2} (82.73/sq mi)

The Communauté de communes de l'Ouest Vosgien is an administrative association of rural communes in the Vosges and Haute-Marne departments of eastern France. It was created on 1 January 2017 by the merger of the former Communauté de communes du Bassin de Neufchâteau, Communauté de communes du Pays de Châtenois and the commune Aroffe. It consists of 69 communes, and has its administrative offices at Neufchâteau. Its area is 728.5 km^{2}, and its population was 23,270 in 2019.

== Composition ==
The communauté de communes consists of the following 69 communes, of which 1, Liffol-le-Petit, in Haute-Marne:

1. Aouze
2. Aroffe
3. Attignéville
4. Autigny-la-Tour
5. Autreville
6. Avranville
7. Balléville
8. Barville
9. Bazoilles-sur-Meuse
10. Brechainville
11. Certilleux
12. Châtenois
13. Chermisey
14. Circourt-sur-Mouzon
15. Clérey-la-Côte
16. Courcelles-sous-Châtenois
17. Coussey
18. Darney-aux-Chênes
19. Dolaincourt
20. Dommartin-sur-Vraine
21. Domrémy-la-Pucelle
22. Frebécourt
23. Fréville
24. Gironcourt-sur-Vraine
25. Grand
26. Greux
27. Harchéchamp
28. Harmonville
29. Houéville
30. Jainvillotte
31. Jubainville
32. Landaville
33. Lemmecourt
34. Liffol-le-Grand
35. Liffol-le-Petit
36. Longchamp-sous-Châtenois
37. Maconcourt
38. Martigny-les-Gerbonvaux
39. Maxey-sur-Meuse
40. Ménil-en-Xaintois
41. Midrevaux
42. Moncel-sur-Vair
43. Mont-lès-Neufchâteau
44. Morelmaison
45. Neufchâteau
46. La Neuveville-sous-Châtenois
47. Ollainville
48. Pargny-sous-Mureau
49. Pleuvezain
50. Pompierre
51. Punerot
52. Rainville
53. Rebeuville
54. Removille
55. Rouvres-la-Chétive
56. Ruppes
57. Saint-Menge
58. Saint-Paul
59. Sartes
60. Seraumont
61. Sionne
62. Soncourt
63. Soulosse-sous-Saint-Élophe
64. Tilleux
65. Trampot
66. Tranqueville-Graux
67. Villouxel
68. Viocourt
69. Vouxey
