= Certilleux =

- Commune
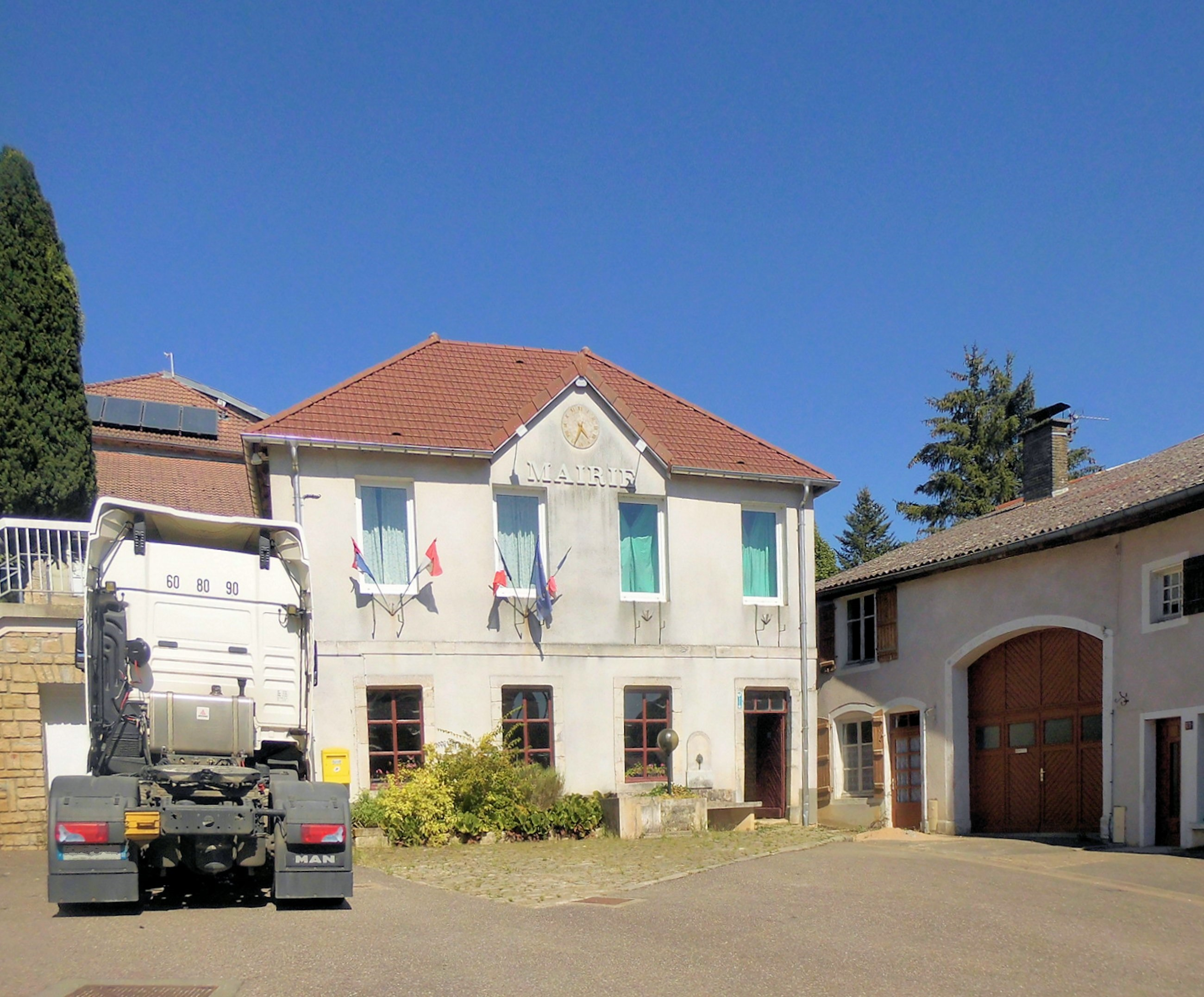
- Certilleux, Mairie Town hall
- Location of Certilleux
- Location within France Location within Grand Est
- Coordinates: 48°18′43″N 5°43′43″E
- Country: France
- Region: Grand Est
- Department: Vosges
- Arrondissement: Neufchâteau
- Canton: Neufchâteau
- Intercommunality: CC l'Ouest Vosgien

Government
  - Mayor (2020–2026): Jean-Marie Louis
- Area^{1}: 5.86 km^{2} (2.26 sq mi)
- Elevation: 303 m (994 ft)
- Highest elevation: 450 m (1,480 ft)
- Lowest elevation: 294 m (965 ft)
- Population (2023): 216
  - Density: 36.9/km^{2} (95.5/sq mi)
- Time zone: UTC+01:00 (CET)
  - Summer (DST): UTC+02:00 (CEST)
- INSEE/Postal code: 88083 /88300
- ^{1} French Land Register data, which excludes lakes, ponds, glaciers > 1 km^{2} (0.386 sq mi or 247 acres) and river estuaries.

Certilleux (French pronunciation: [sɛʁtijø]) is a commune in the Vosges department in Grand Est in northeastern France.

== See also ==
- Communes of the Vosges department
