= Canton of Neufchâteau =

Coordinates: 48°19′39″N 5°40′26″E

Neufchâteau
- Canton
- Country: France
- Region: Grand Est
- Department: Vosges
- No. of communes: {{{nbcomm}}}
- Area: 549.58 km^{2} (212.19 sq mi)
- Population (2023): 17,015
  - Density: 30.960/km^{2} (80.186/sq mi)
- INSEE code: 88 10

The Canton of Neufchâteau is a rural French administrative and electoral grouping of communes in the Vosges département of eastern France and in the region of Grand Est. The canton has its administrative centre at Neufchâteau.

== Composition ==
At the French canton reorganisation which came into effect in March 2015, the canton was expanded from 25 to 46 communes:

- Attignéville
- Autigny-la-Tour
- Autreville
- Avranville
- Barville
- Bazoilles-sur-Meuse
- Beaufremont
- Brechainville
- Certilleux
- Chermisey
- Circourt-sur-Mouzon
- Clérey-la-Côte
- Coussey
- Domrémy-la-Pucelle
- Frebécourt
- Fréville
- Grand
- Greux
- Harchéchamp
- Harmonville
- Houéville
- Jainvillotte
- Jubainville
- Landaville
- Lemmecourt
- Liffol-le-Grand
- Martigny-les-Gerbonvaux
- Maxey-sur-Meuse
- Midrevaux
- Moncel-sur-Vair
- Mont-lès-Neufchâteau
- Neufchâteau
- Pargny-sous-Mureau
- Pompierre
- Punerot
- Rebeuville
- Rouvres-la-Chétive
- Ruppes
- Sartes
- Seraumont
- Sionne
- Soulosse-sous-Saint-Élophe
- Tilleux
- Trampot
- Tranqueville-Graux
- Villouxel
