= Brechainville =

- Commune
- Location of Brechainville
- Location within France Location within Grand Est
- Coordinates: 48°22′02″N 5°29′14″E
- Country: France
- Region: Grand Est
- Department: Vosges
- Arrondissement: Neufchâteau
- Canton: Neufchâteau
- Intercommunality: CC l'Ouest Vosgien

Government
  - Mayor (2020–2026): Estelle Clerget
- Area^{1}: 14.15 km^{2} (5.46 sq mi)
- Elevation: 393 m (1,289 ft)
- Highest elevation: 442 m (1,450 ft)
- Lowest elevation: 347 m (1,138 ft)
- Population (2023): 55
  - Density: 3.9/km^{2} (10/sq mi)
- Time zone: UTC+01:00 (CET)
  - Summer (DST): UTC+02:00 (CEST)
- INSEE/Postal code: 88074 /88350
- ^{1} French Land Register data, which excludes lakes, ponds, glaciers > 1 km^{2} (0.386 sq mi or 247 acres) and river estuaries.

Brechainville is a commune in the Vosges department in Grand Est in northeastern France.

== See also ==
- Communes of the Vosges department
