= Rebeuville =

- Commune
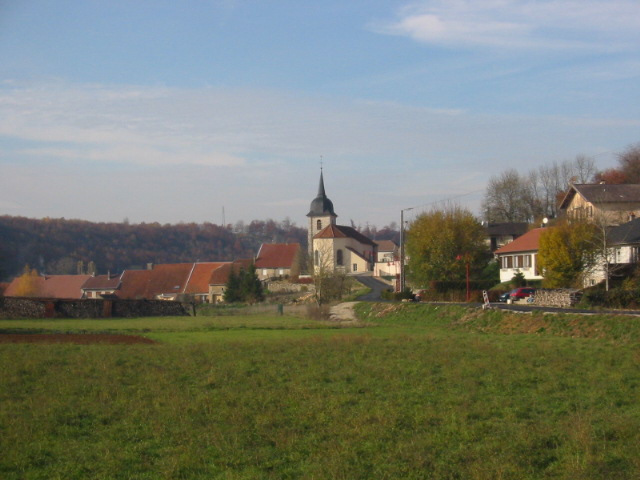
- A general view of Rebeuville
- Location of Rebeuville
- Location within France Location within Grand Est
- Coordinates: 48°20′06″N 5°42′15″E
- Country: France
- Region: Grand Est
- Department: Vosges
- Arrondissement: Neufchâteau
- Canton: Neufchâteau
- Intercommunality: CC l'Ouest Vosgien

Government
  - Mayor (2020–2026): Michel Lallemand
- Area^{1}: 8.72 km^{2} (3.37 sq mi)
- Elevation: 290 m (950 ft)
- Highest elevation: 425 m (1,394 ft)
- Lowest elevation: 282 m (925 ft)
- Population (2023): 294
  - Density: 33.7/km^{2} (87.3/sq mi)
- Time zone: UTC+01:00 (CET)
  - Summer (DST): UTC+02:00 (CEST)
- INSEE/Postal code: 88376 /88300
- ^{1} French Land Register data, which excludes lakes, ponds, glaciers > 1 km^{2} (0.386 sq mi or 247 acres) and river estuaries.

Rebeuville is a commune in the Vosges department in Grand Est in northeastern France.

== See also ==
- Communes of the Vosges department
