= Landaville =

- Commune
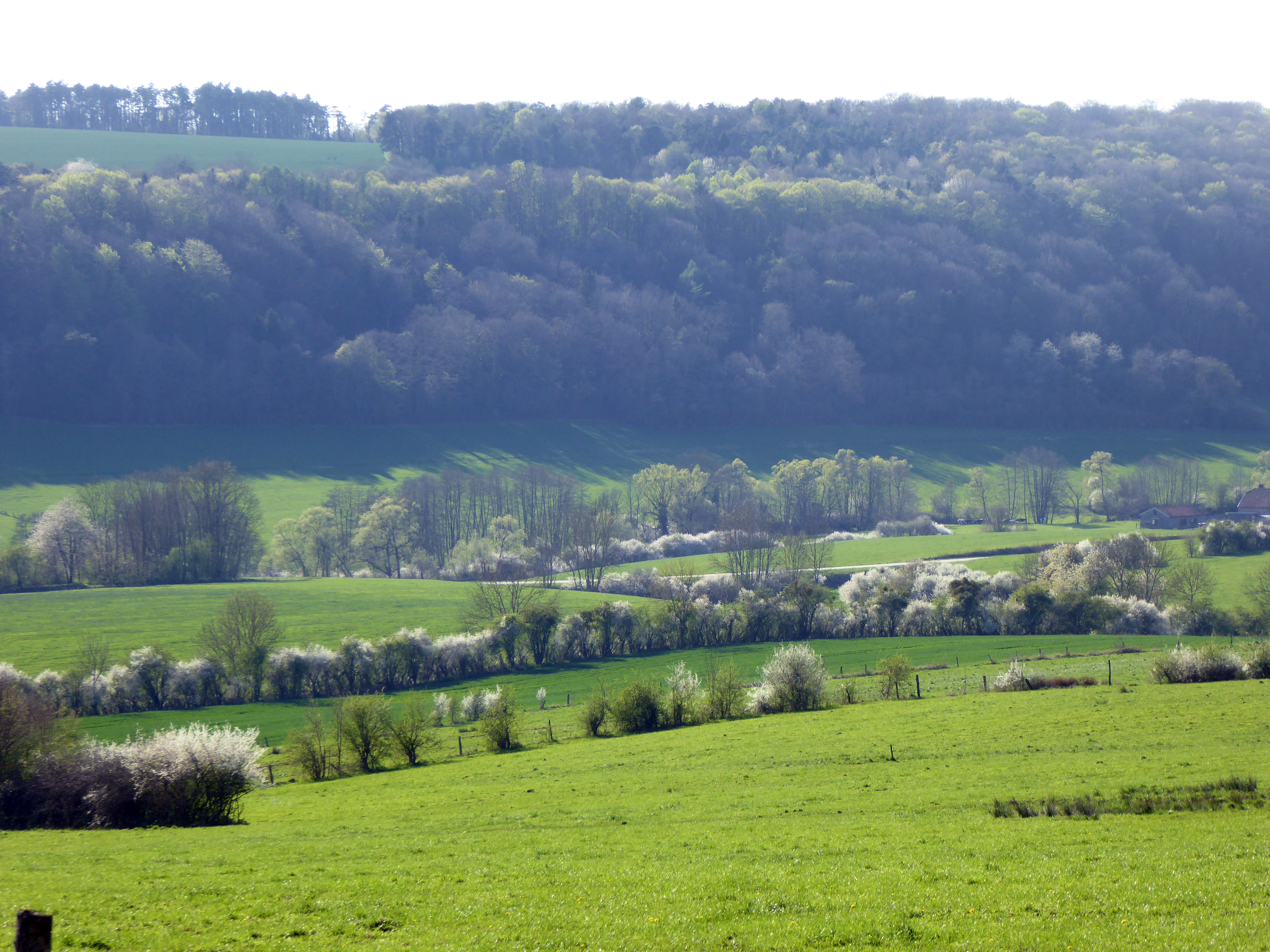
- The Vallée du Bany in Landaville
- Location of Landaville
- Location within France Location within Grand Est
- Coordinates: 48°17′21″N 5°44′40″E
- Country: France
- Region: Grand Est
- Department: Vosges
- Arrondissement: Neufchâteau
- Canton: Neufchâteau
- Intercommunality: CC l'Ouest Vosgien

Government
  - Mayor (2020–2026): Christian Alberti
- Area^{1}: 13.06 km^{2} (5.04 sq mi)
- Elevation: 340 m (1,120 ft)
- Highest elevation: 483 m (1,585 ft)
- Lowest elevation: 311 m (1,020 ft)
- Population (2023): 288
  - Density: 22.1/km^{2} (57.1/sq mi)
- Time zone: UTC+01:00 (CET)
  - Summer (DST): UTC+02:00 (CEST)
- INSEE/Postal code: 88259 /88300
- ^{1} French Land Register data, which excludes lakes, ponds, glaciers > 1 km^{2} (0.386 sq mi or 247 acres) and river estuaries.

Landaville (French pronunciation: [lɑ̃davil]) is a commune in the Vosges department in Grand Est in northeastern France.

== See also ==
- Communes of the Vosges department
