= Fréville, Vosges =

Fréville
- Commune
- Location of Fréville
- Location within France Location within Grand Est
- Coordinates: 48°19′38″N 5°36′36″E
- Country: France
- Region: Grand Est
- Department: Vosges
- Arrondissement: Neufchâteau
- Canton: Neufchâteau
- Intercommunality: CC l'Ouest Vosgien

Government
  - Mayor (2020–2026): Stéphane Leblanc
- Area^{1}: 6.36 km^{2} (2.46 sq mi)
- Elevation: 340 m (1,120 ft)
- Highest elevation: 445 m (1,460 ft)
- Lowest elevation: 300 m (980 ft)
- Population (2023): 133
  - Density: 20.9/km^{2} (54.2/sq mi)
- Time zone: UTC+01:00 (CET)
  - Summer (DST): UTC+02:00 (CEST)
- INSEE/Postal code: 88189 /88350
- ^{1} French Land Register data, which excludes lakes, ponds, glaciers > 1 km^{2} (0.386 sq mi or 247 acres) and river estuaries.

Fréville (French pronunciation: [fʁevil]) is a commune in the Vosges department in Grand Est in northeastern France.

== See also ==
- Communes of the Vosges department
