= Circourt-sur-Mouzon =

- Commune
- Location of Circourt-sur-Mouzon
- Location within France Location within Grand Est
- Coordinates: 48°17′51″N 5°42′35″E
- Country: France
- Region: Grand Est
- Department: Vosges
- Arrondissement: Neufchâteau
- Canton: Neufchâteau
- Intercommunality: CC l'Ouest Vosgien

Government
  - Mayor (2020–2026): Rose-Marie Bogard
- Area^{1}: 10.3 km^{2} (4.0 sq mi)
- Elevation: 340 m (1,120 ft)
- Highest elevation: 426 m (1,398 ft)
- Lowest elevation: 287 m (942 ft)
- Population (2023): 186
  - Density: 18.1/km^{2} (46.8/sq mi)
- Time zone: UTC+01:00 (CET)
  - Summer (DST): UTC+02:00 (CEST)
- INSEE/Postal code: 88104 /88300
- ^{1} French Land Register data, which excludes lakes, ponds, glaciers > 1 km^{2} (0.386 sq mi or 247 acres) and river estuaries.

Circourt-sur-Mouzon (French pronunciation: [siʁkuʁ syʁ muzɔ̃], literally Circourt on Mouzon) is a commune in the Vosges department in Grand Est in northeastern France.

== See also ==
- Communes of the Vosges department
