= Jainvillotte =

- Commune
- Location of Jainvillotte
- Location within France Location within Grand Est
- Coordinates: 48°15′30″N 5°41′53″E
- Country: France
- Region: Grand Est
- Department: Vosges
- Arrondissement: Neufchâteau
- Canton: Neufchâteau
- Intercommunality: Ouest Vosgien

Government
  - Mayor (2020–2026): Sandra Comolli-Grandvuillemin
- Area^{1}: 7.44 km^{2} (2.87 sq mi)
- Highest elevation: 458 m (1,503 ft)
- Lowest elevation: 303 m (994 ft)
- Population (2023): 71
  - Density: 9.5/km^{2} (25/sq mi)
- Time zone: UTC+01:00 (CET)
  - Summer (DST): UTC+02:00 (CEST)
- INSEE/Postal code: 88249 /88300
- ^{1} French Land Register data, which excludes lakes, ponds, glaciers > 1 km^{2} (0.386 sq mi or 247 acres) and river estuaries.

Jainvillotte (French pronunciation: [ʒɛ̃vilɔt]) is a commune in Vosges, a department in Grand Est in northeastern France.

== Population ==
Historical population
Year	Pop.	±% p.a.
1968	96	—
1975	96	+0.00%
1982	102	+0.87%
1990	77	−3.45%
1999	89	+1.62%
2007	90	+0.14%
2012	79	−2.57%
2017	79	+0.00%
2023	71	−1.76%
Source: INSEE

== See also ==
- Communes of the Vosges department
