= Tilleux =

- Commune
- Location of Tilleux
- Location within France Location within Grand Est
- Coordinates: 48°18′03″N 5°43′39″E
- Country: France
- Region: Grand Est
- Department: Vosges
- Arrondissement: Neufchâteau
- Canton: Neufchâteau
- Intercommunality: CC l'Ouest Vosgien

Government
  - Mayor (2020–2026): François Fauchart
- Area^{1}: 3.88 km^{2} (1.50 sq mi)
- Elevation: 380 m (1,250 ft)
- Highest elevation: 458 m (1,503 ft)
- Lowest elevation: 295 m (968 ft)
- Population (2023): 67
  - Density: 17/km^{2} (45/sq mi)
- Time zone: UTC+01:00 (CET)
  - Summer (DST): UTC+02:00 (CEST)
- INSEE/Postal code: 88474 /88300
- ^{1} French Land Register data, which excludes lakes, ponds, glaciers > 1 km^{2} (0.386 sq mi or 247 acres) and river estuaries.

Tilleux (French pronunciation: [tijø]) is a commune in the Vosges department in Grand Est, in northeastern France. It is 9 km south of Neufchâteau.

== See also ==
- Communes of the Vosges department
