= Villouxel =

- Commune
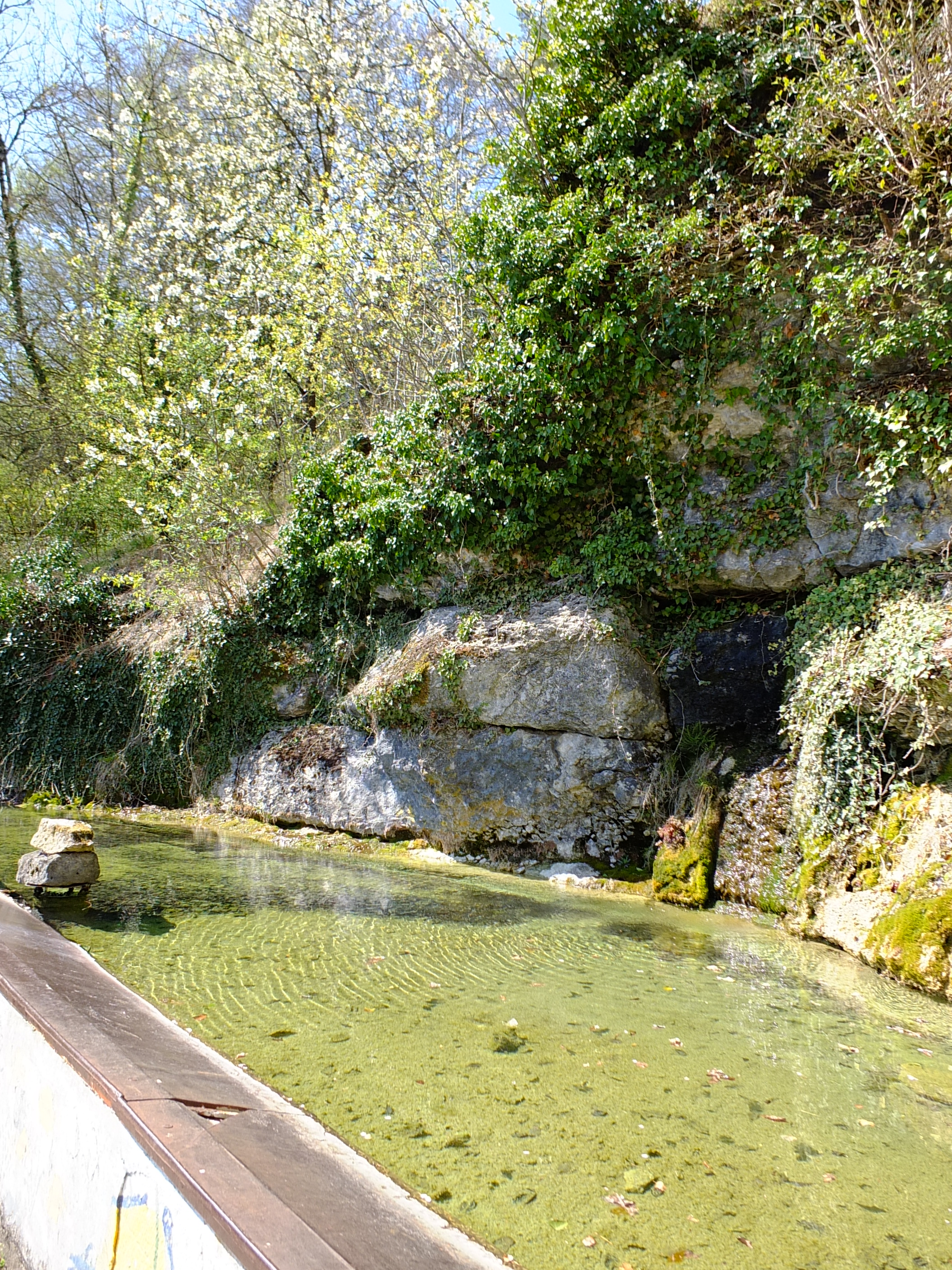
- The fountain in Villouxel

- Coat of arms
- Location of Villouxel
- Location within France Location within Grand Est
- Coordinates: 48°20′38″N 5°34′42″E
- Country: France
- Region: Grand Est
- Department: Vosges
- Arrondissement: Neufchâteau
- Canton: Neufchâteau
- Intercommunality: CC l'Ouest Vosgien

Government
  - Mayor (2020–2026): Patrick Chillon
- Area^{1}: 4.65 km^{2} (1.80 sq mi)
- Elevation: 363 m (1,191 ft)
- Highest elevation: 438 m (1,437 ft)
- Lowest elevation: 298 m (978 ft)
- Population (2023): 83
  - Density: 18/km^{2} (46/sq mi)
- Time zone: UTC+01:00 (CET)
  - Summer (DST): UTC+02:00 (CEST)
- INSEE/Postal code: 88511 /88350
- ^{1} French Land Register data, which excludes lakes, ponds, glaciers > 1 km^{2} (0.386 sq mi or 247 acres) and river estuaries.

Villouxel is a commune in the Vosges department in Grand Est in northeastern France.

== See also ==
- Communes of the Vosges department
