= Lemmecourt =

- Commune
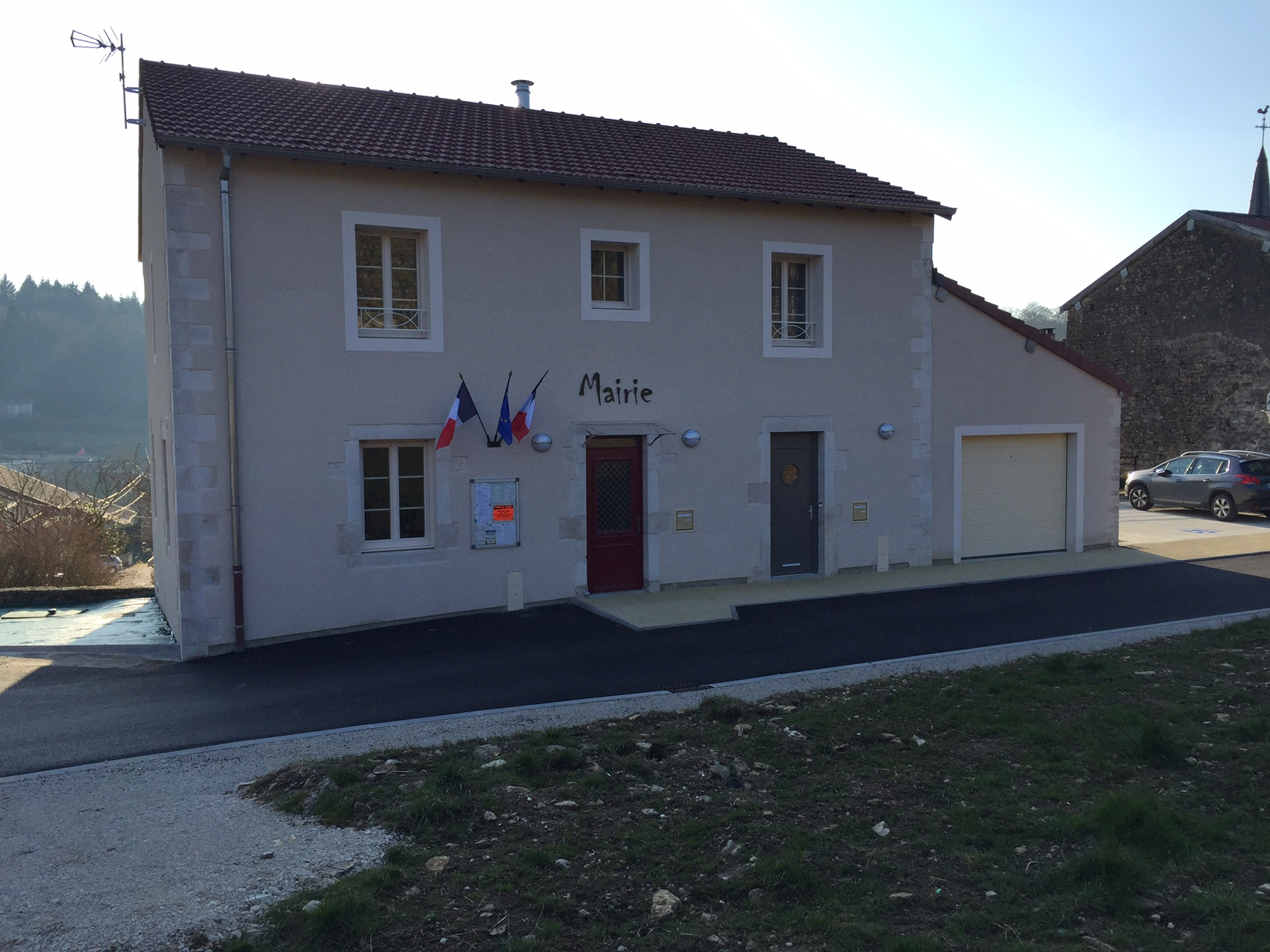
- Town hall
- Location of Lemmecourt
- Location within France Location within Grand Est
- Coordinates: 48°15′43″N 5°44′14″E
- Country: France
- Region: Grand Est
- Department: Vosges
- Arrondissement: Neufchâteau
- Canton: Neufchâteau
- Intercommunality: CC l'Ouest Vosgien

Government
  - Mayor (2020–2026): Laurent Galand
- Area^{1}: 1.78 km^{2} (0.69 sq mi)
- Elevation: 362 m (1,188 ft)
- Highest elevation: 442 m (1,450 ft)
- Lowest elevation: 347 m (1,138 ft)
- Population (2023): 23
  - Density: 13/km^{2} (33/sq mi)
- Time zone: UTC+01:00 (CET)
  - Summer (DST): UTC+02:00 (CEST)
- INSEE/Postal code: 88265 /88300
- ^{1} French Land Register data, which excludes lakes, ponds, glaciers > 1 km^{2} (0.386 sq mi or 247 acres) and river estuaries.

Lemmecourt (French pronunciation: [lɛmkuʁ]) is a commune in the Vosges department in Grand Est in northeastern France.

== See also ==
- Communes of the Vosges department
