= Moncel-sur-Vair =

- Commune
- Location of Moncel-sur-Vair
- Location within France Location within Grand Est
- Coordinates: 48°25′19″N 5°42′08″E
- Country: France
- Region: Grand Est
- Department: Vosges
- Arrondissement: Neufchâteau
- Canton: Neufchâteau
- Intercommunality: CC Ouest Vosgien

Government
  - Mayor (2020–2026): Jean-Philippe Hofer
- Area^{1}: 7.3 km^{2} (2.8 sq mi)
- Elevation: 300 m (980 ft)
- Highest elevation: 453 m (1,486 ft)
- Lowest elevation: 269 m (883 ft)
- Population (2023): 171
  - Density: 23/km^{2} (61/sq mi)
- Time zone: UTC+01:00 (CET)
  - Summer (DST): UTC+02:00 (CEST)
- INSEE/Postal code: 88305 /88630
- ^{1} French Land Register data, which excludes lakes, ponds, glaciers > 1 km^{2} (0.386 sq mi or 247 acres) and river estuaries.

Moncel-sur-Vair (French pronunciation: [mɔ̃sɛl syʁ vɛʁ], literally Moncel on Vair) is a commune in the Vosges department in Grand Est in north-eastern France.

The commune was created in 1965 by the fusion of the former communes of Gouécourt and Moncel-et-Happoncourt.

== See also ==
- Communes of the Vosges department
