= Sartes =

- Commune
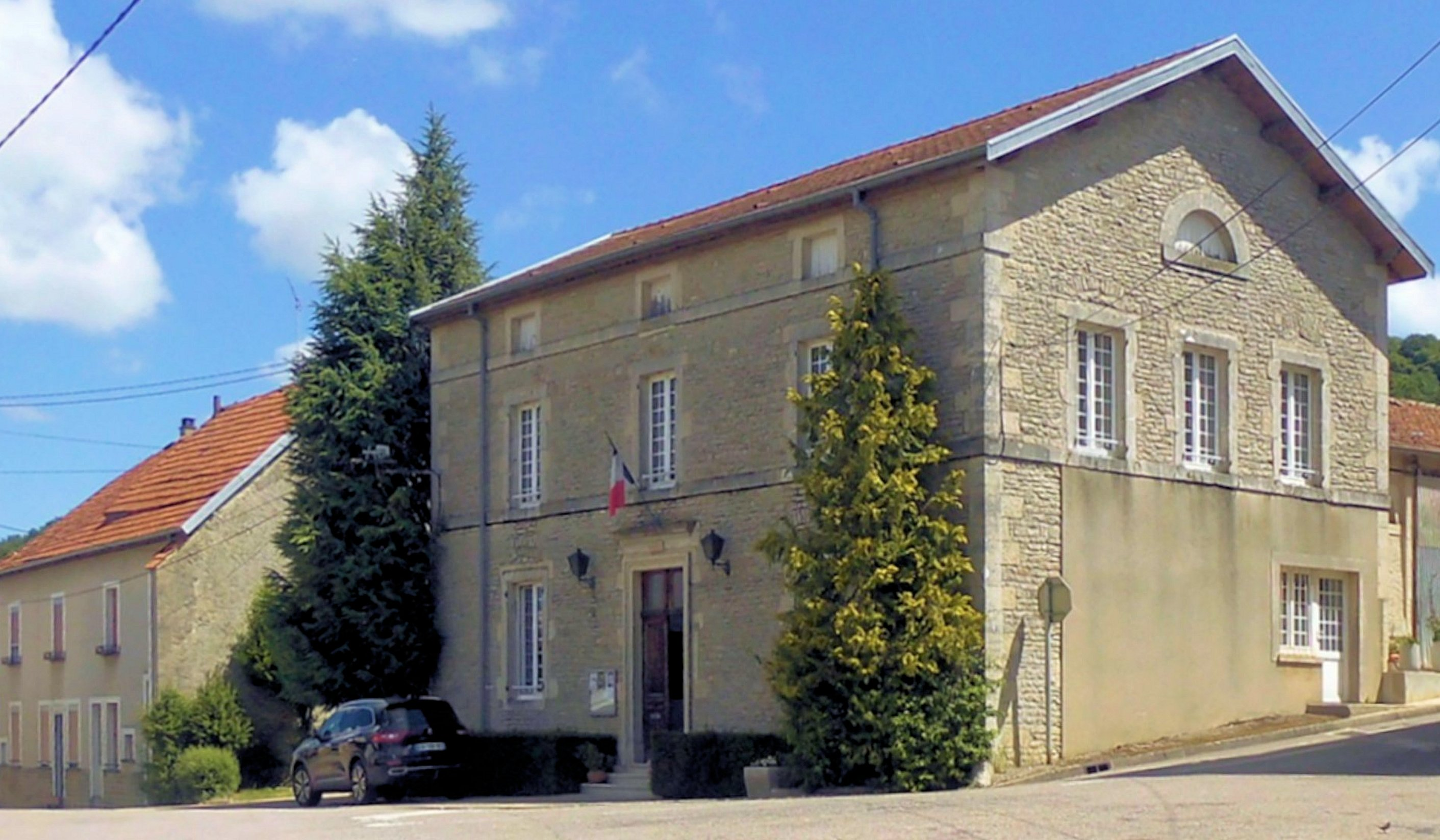
- Town hall
- Location of Sartes
- Location within France Location within Grand Est
- Coordinates: 48°14′45″N 5°40′38″E
- Country: France
- Region: Grand Est
- Department: Vosges
- Arrondissement: Neufchâteau
- Canton: Neufchâteau
- Intercommunality: CC l'Ouest Vosgien

Government
  - Mayor (2020–2026): Jean-Luc Arnault
- Area^{1}: 6.86 km^{2} (2.65 sq mi)
- Elevation: 313 m (1,027 ft)
- Highest elevation: 466 m (1,529 ft)
- Lowest elevation: 308 m (1,010 ft)
- Population (2023): 88
  - Density: 13/km^{2} (33/sq mi)
- Time zone: UTC+01:00 (CET)
  - Summer (DST): UTC+02:00 (CEST)
- INSEE/Postal code: 88443 /88300
- ^{1} French Land Register data, which excludes lakes, ponds, glaciers > 1 km^{2} (0.386 sq mi or 247 acres) and river estuaries.

Sartes (French pronunciation: [saʁt]) is a commune in the Vosges department in Grand Est in northeastern France.

== See also ==
- Communes of the Vosges department
