= Harmonville =

- Commune
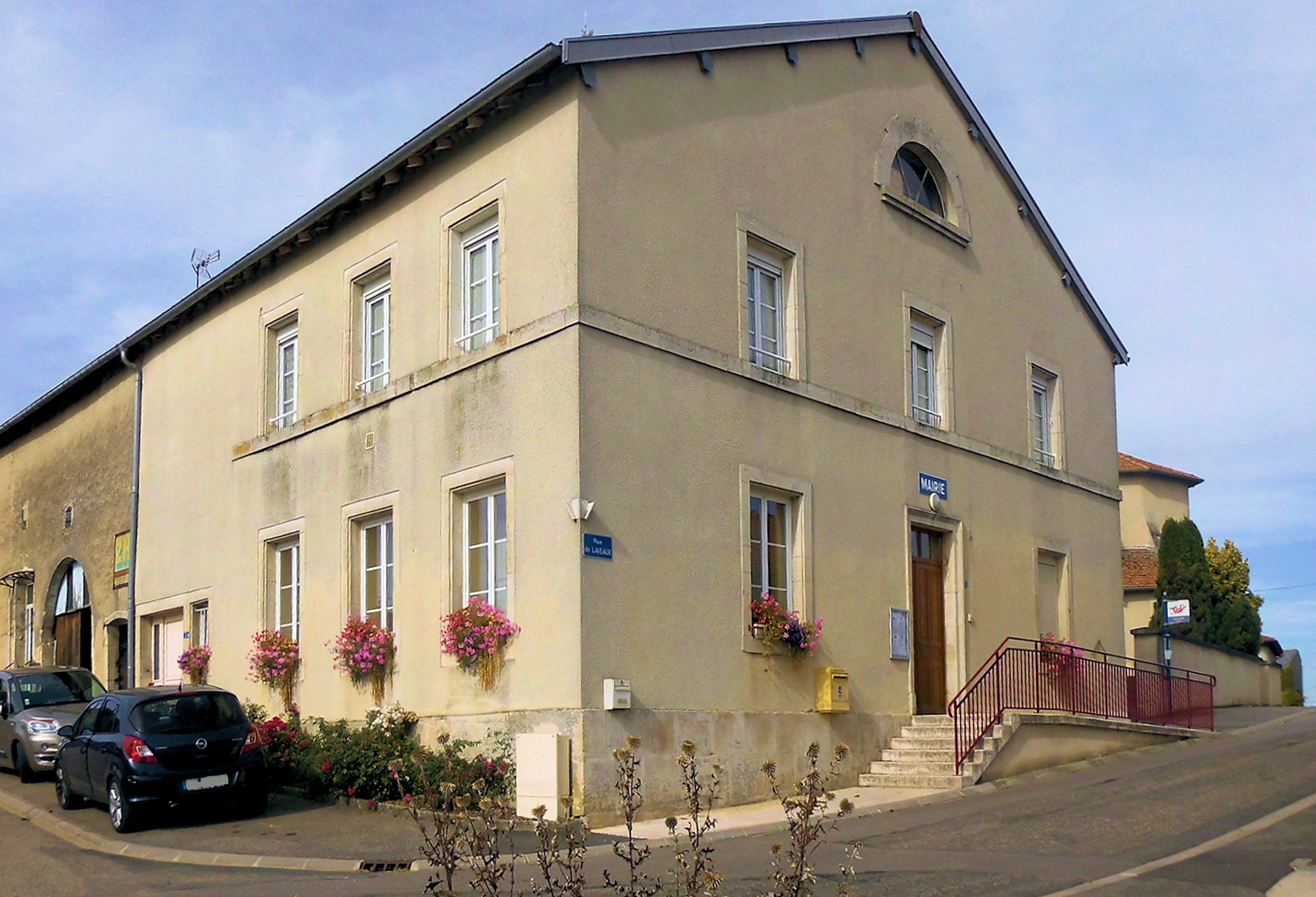
- The town hall in Harmonville
- Location of Harmonville
- Location within France Location within Grand Est
- Coordinates: 48°28′43″N 5°51′37″E
- Country: France
- Region: Grand Est
- Department: Vosges
- Arrondissement: Neufchâteau
- Canton: Neufchâteau
- Intercommunality: CC l'Ouest Vosgien

Government
  - Mayor (2020–2026): Stéphane Philippe
- Area^{1}: 15.13 km^{2} (5.84 sq mi)
- Elevation: 313 m (1,027 ft)
- Highest elevation: 398 m (1,306 ft)
- Lowest elevation: 295 m (968 ft)
- Population (2023): 208
  - Density: 13.7/km^{2} (35.6/sq mi)
- Time zone: UTC+01:00 (CET)
  - Summer (DST): UTC+02:00 (CEST)
- INSEE/Postal code: 88232 /88300
- ^{1} French Land Register data, which excludes lakes, ponds, glaciers > 1 km^{2} (0.386 sq mi or 247 acres) and river estuaries.

Harmonville (French pronunciation: [aʁmɔ̃vil]) is a commune in the Vosges department in Grand Est in northeastern France.

== See also ==
- Communes of the Vosges department
