= Punerot =

- Commune
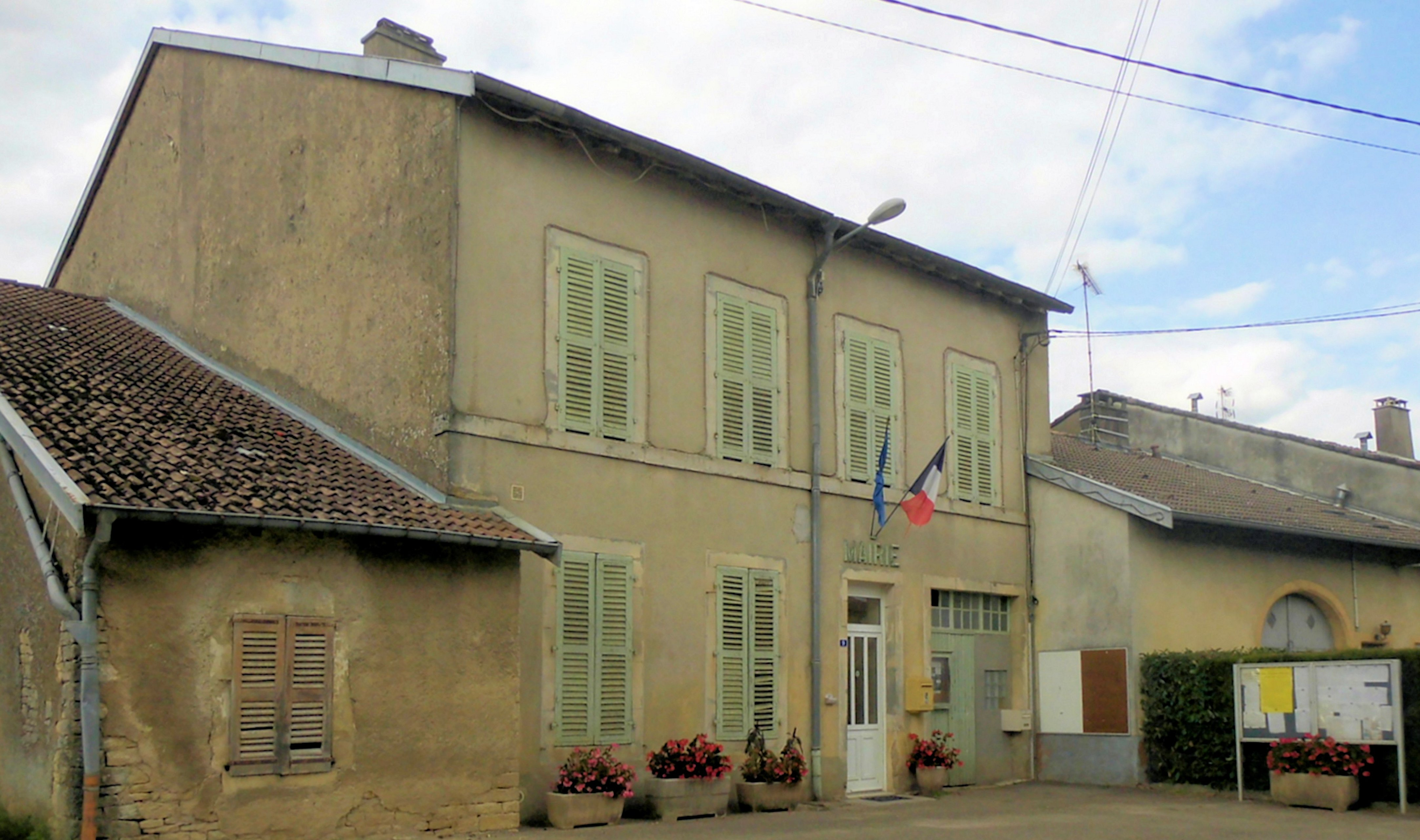
- The town hall in Punerot
- Location of Punerot
- Location within France Location within Grand Est
- Coordinates: 48°28′57″N 5°48′33″E
- Country: France
- Region: Grand Est
- Department: Vosges
- Arrondissement: Neufchâteau
- Canton: Neufchâteau
- Intercommunality: CC Ouest Vosgien

Government
  - Mayor (2020–2026): Agathe Tisseron-Chognot
- Area^{1}: 13.77 km^{2} (5.32 sq mi)
- Elevation: 293 m (961 ft)
- Highest elevation: 361 m (1,184 ft)
- Lowest elevation: 283 m (928 ft)
- Population (2023): 149
  - Density: 10.8/km^{2} (28.0/sq mi)
- Time zone: UTC+01:00 (CET)
  - Summer (DST): UTC+02:00 (CEST)
- INSEE/Postal code: 88363 /88630
- ^{1} French Land Register data, which excludes lakes, ponds, glaciers > 1 km^{2} (0.386 sq mi or 247 acres) and river estuaries.

Punerot (French pronunciation: [pynʁo]) is a commune in the Vosges department in Grand Est in northeastern France.

== See also ==
- Communes of the Vosges department
