= Jubainville =

- Commune
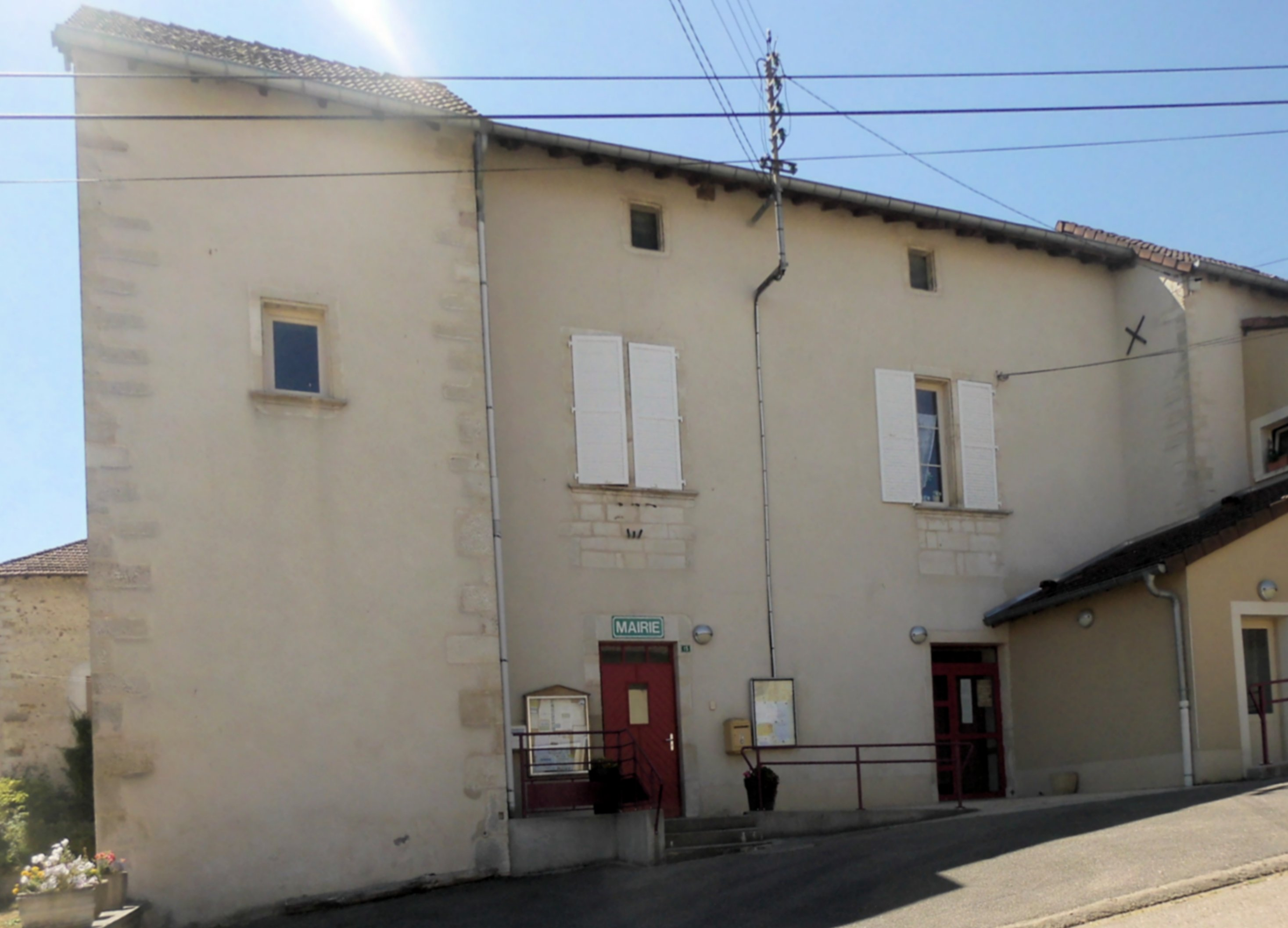
- The town hall in Jubainville

- Coat of arms
- Location of Jubainville
- Location within France Location within Grand Est
- Coordinates: 48°27′39″N 5°44′37″E
- Country: France
- Region: Grand Est
- Department: Vosges
- Arrondissement: Neufchâteau
- Canton: Neufchâteau
- Intercommunality: CC l'Ouest Vosgien

Government
  - Mayor (2020–2026): Lys Tulpin
- Area^{1}: 4.33 km^{2} (1.67 sq mi)
- Elevation: 320 m (1,050 ft)
- Highest elevation: 420 m (1,380 ft)
- Lowest elevation: 280 m (920 ft)
- Population (2023): 88
  - Density: 20/km^{2} (53/sq mi)
- Time zone: UTC+01:00 (CET)
  - Summer (DST): UTC+02:00 (CEST)
- INSEE/Postal code: 88255 /88630
- ^{1} French Land Register data, which excludes lakes, ponds, glaciers > 1 km^{2} (0.386 sq mi or 247 acres) and river estuaries.

Jubainville (French pronunciation: [ʒybɛ̃vil]) is a commune in the Vosges department in Grand Est in northeastern France.

== See also ==
- Communes of the Vosges department
