= Martigny-les-Gerbonvaux =

- Commune
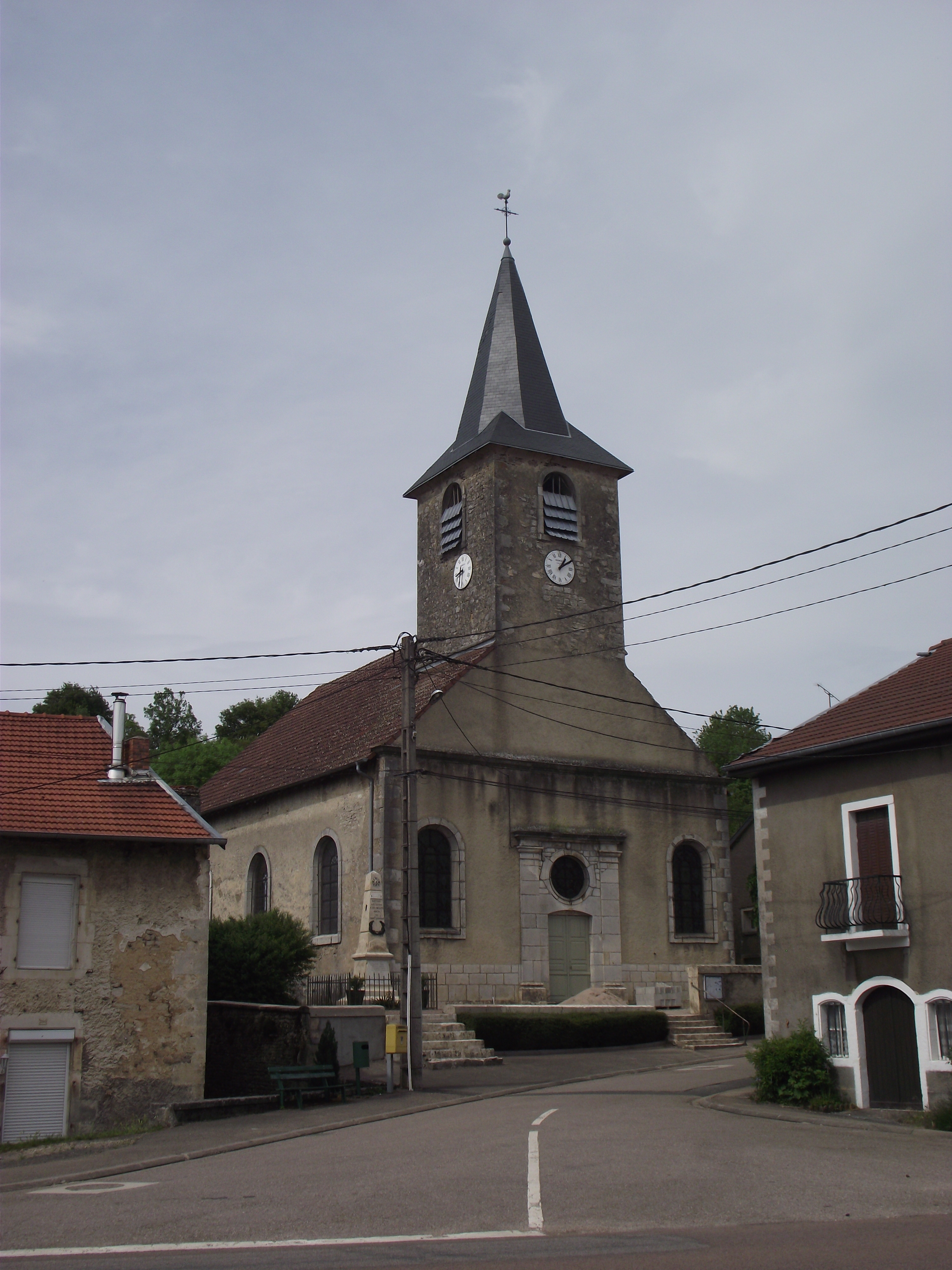
- The church in Martigny-les-Gerbonvaux

- Coat of arms
- Location of Martigny-les-Gerbonvaux
- Location within France Location within Grand Est
- Coordinates: 48°26′47″N 5°47′43″E
- Country: France
- Region: Grand Est
- Department: Vosges
- Arrondissement: Neufchâteau
- Canton: Neufchâteau
- Intercommunality: CC Ouest Vosgien

Government
  - Mayor (2020–2026): Jenny Willemin
- Area^{1}: 9.04 km^{2} (3.49 sq mi)
- Elevation: 375 m (1,230 ft)
- Highest elevation: 395 m (1,296 ft)
- Lowest elevation: 288 m (945 ft)
- Population (2023): 121
  - Density: 13.4/km^{2} (34.7/sq mi)
- Time zone: UTC+01:00 (CET)
  - Summer (DST): UTC+02:00 (CEST)
- INSEE/Postal code: 88290 /88300
- ^{1} French Land Register data, which excludes lakes, ponds, glaciers > 1 km^{2} (0.386 sq mi or 247 acres) and river estuaries.

Martigny-les-Gerbonvaux (French pronunciation: [maʁtiɲi le ʒɛʁbɔ̃vo]) is a commune in the Vosges department in Grand Est in northeastern France.

== History ==
During the Gallo-Roman period, Martigny was already on a known transit route, positioned between Metz and Langres.

== See also ==
- Communes of the Vosges department
