= Avranville =

- Commune
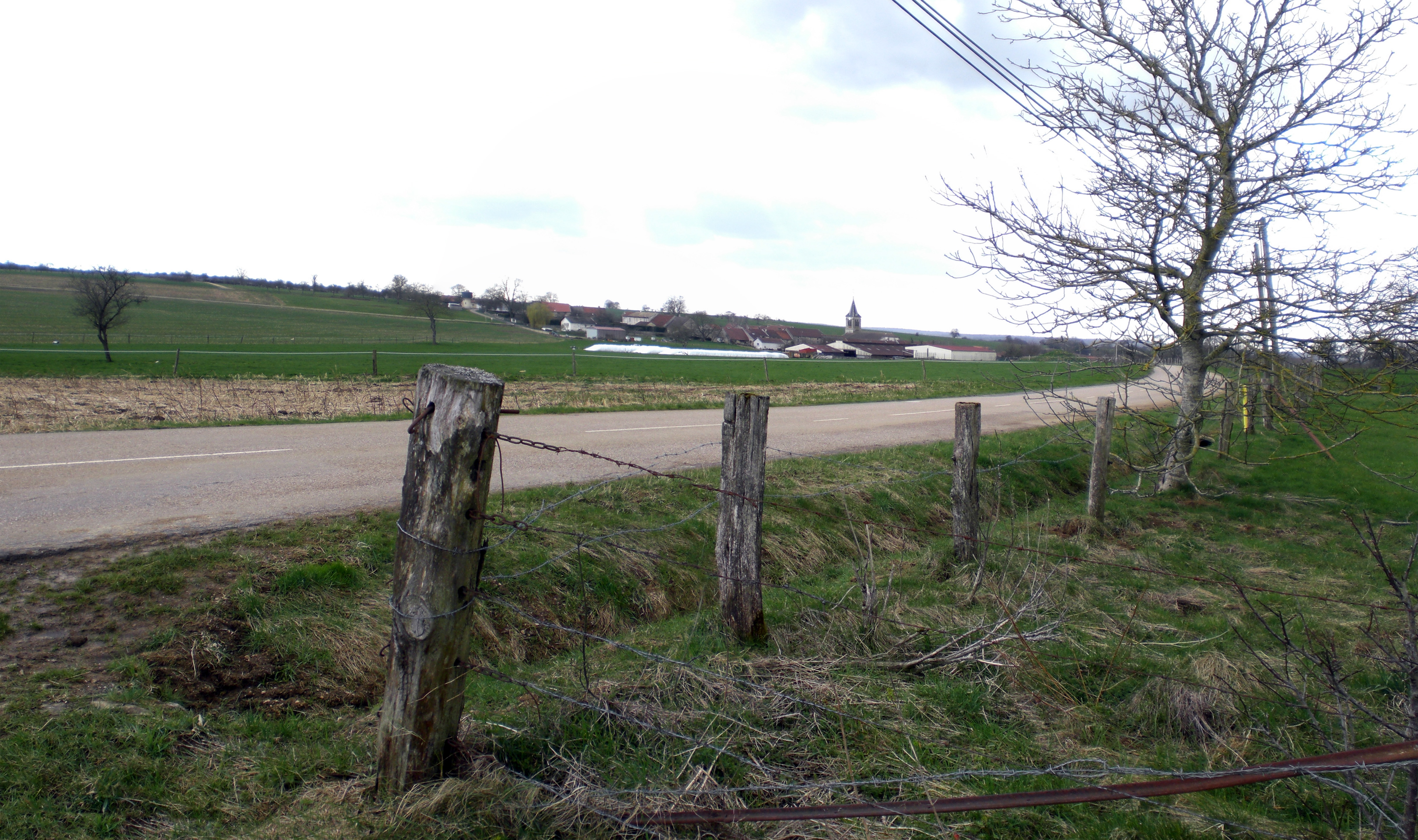
- A general view of Avranville

- Coat of arms
- Location of Avranville
- Location within France Location within Grand Est
- Coordinates: 48°25′27″N 5°31′44″E
- Country: France
- Region: Grand Est
- Department: Vosges
- Arrondissement: Neufchâteau
- Canton: Neufchâteau
- Intercommunality: CC Ouest Vosgien

Government
  - Mayor (2020–2026): Joël Français
- Area^{1}: 10.89 km^{2} (4.20 sq mi)
- Elevation: 400 m (1,300 ft)
- Highest elevation: 442 m (1,450 ft)
- Lowest elevation: 327 m (1,073 ft)
- Population (2023): 66
  - Density: 6.1/km^{2} (16/sq mi)
- Time zone: UTC+01:00 (CET)
  - Summer (DST): UTC+02:00 (CEST)
- INSEE/Postal code: 88025 /88630
- ^{1} French Land Register data, which excludes lakes, ponds, glaciers > 1 km^{2} (0.386 sq mi or 247 acres) and river estuaries.

Avranville (French pronunciation: [avʁɑ̃vil]) is a commune in the Vosges department in Grand Est in northeastern France.

== Heraldry ==
Recent arms of Avranville	Divided wavy: in the 1st part, I azure with a garden rose stalked and leaved or, in the 2nd argent with an oak tree of Tenné, leaved vert and fruited or, in the 2nd gules with three silver lioncels crowned or. Adopted on November 6, 2025. Author: Jean-François Binon

== See also ==
- Communes of the Vosges department
