= Autigny-la-Tour =

- Commune
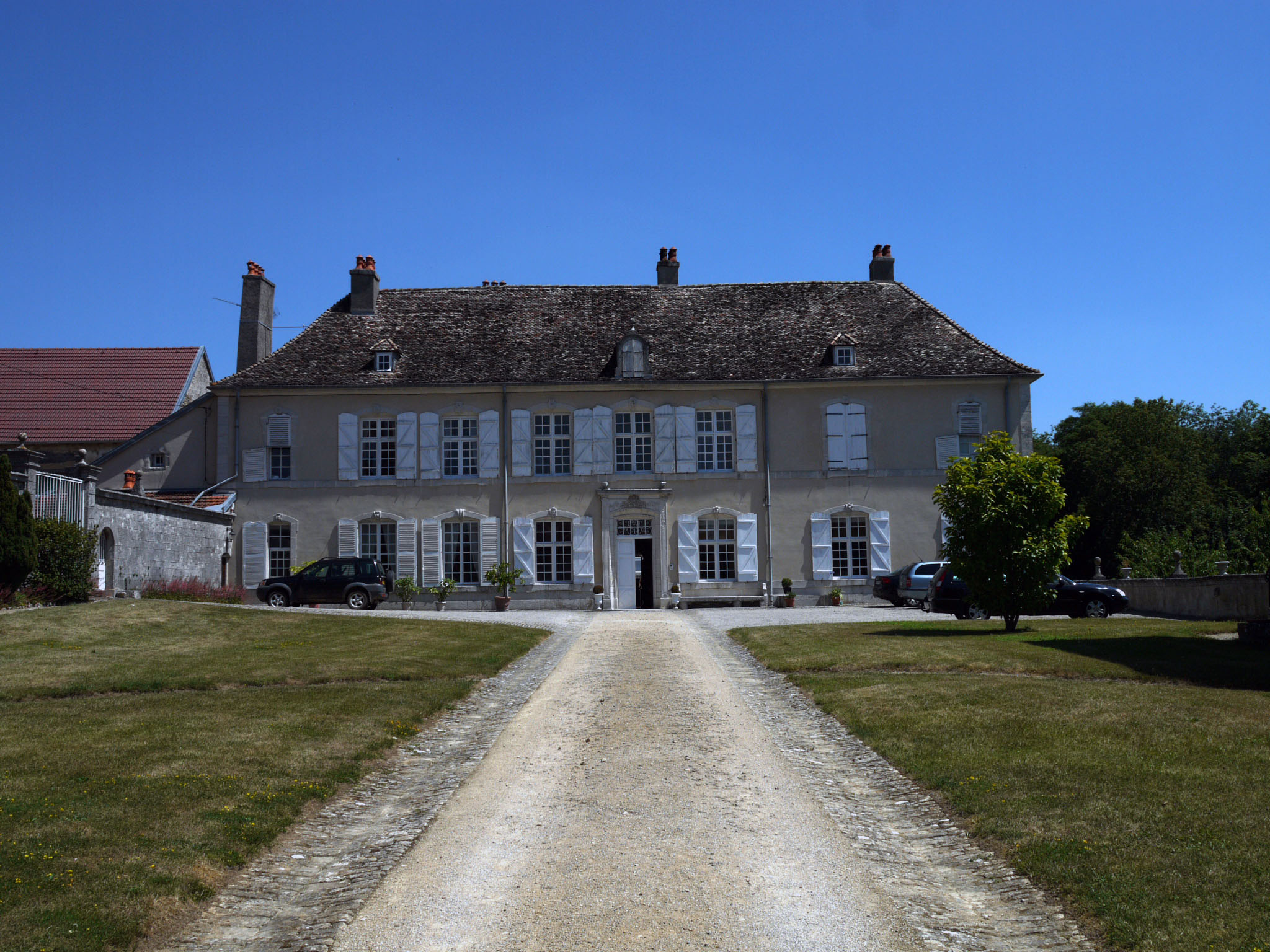
- The chateau in Autigny-la-Tour
- Location of Autigny-la-Tour
- Location within France Location within Grand Est
- Coordinates: 48°24′00″N 5°45′37″E
- Country: France
- Region: Grand Est
- Department: Vosges
- Arrondissement: Neufchâteau
- Canton: Neufchâteau
- Intercommunality: CC Ouest Vosgien

Government
  - Mayor (2020–2026): Dominique Humbert
- Area^{1}: 15.86 km^{2} (6.12 sq mi)
- Elevation: 260 m (850 ft)
- Highest elevation: 406 m (1,332 ft)
- Lowest elevation: 282 m (925 ft)
- Population (2023): 144
  - Density: 9.08/km^{2} (23.5/sq mi)
- Time zone: UTC+01:00 (CET)
  - Summer (DST): UTC+02:00 (CEST)
- INSEE/Postal code: 88019 /88300
- ^{1} French Land Register data, which excludes lakes, ponds, glaciers > 1 km^{2} (0.386 sq mi or 247 acres) and river estuaries.

Autigny-la-Tour (French pronunciation: [otiɲi la tuʁ]) is a commune in the Vosges department in Grand Est in northeastern France.

== See also ==
- Communes of the Vosges department
