= Autreville, Vosges =

Autreville
- Commune
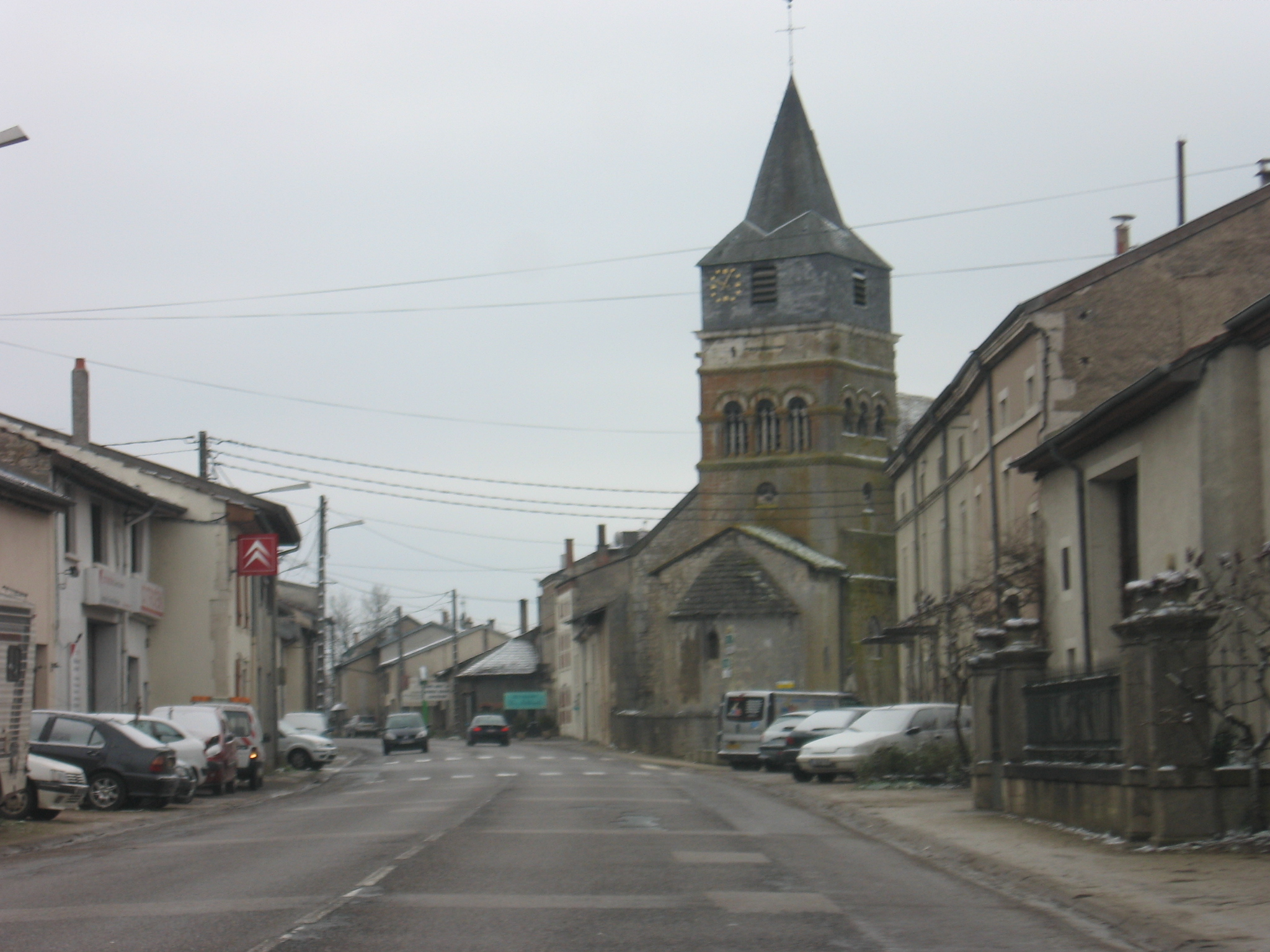
- The church in Autreville
- Location of Autreville
- Location within France Location within Grand Est
- Coordinates: 48°29′05″N 5°50′58″E
- Country: France
- Region: Grand Est
- Department: Vosges
- Arrondissement: Neufchâteau
- Canton: Neufchâteau
- Intercommunality: CC Ouest Vosgien

Government
  - Mayor (2020–2026): Jean-Marie Bigeon
- Area^{1}: 11.09 km^{2} (4.28 sq mi)
- Elevation: 312 m (1,024 ft)
- Highest elevation: 364 m (1,194 ft)
- Lowest elevation: 287 m (942 ft)
- Population (2023): 194
  - Density: 17.5/km^{2} (45.3/sq mi)
- Time zone: UTC+01:00 (CET)
  - Summer (DST): UTC+02:00 (CEST)
- INSEE/Postal code: 88020 /88300
- ^{1} French Land Register data, which excludes lakes, ponds, glaciers > 1 km^{2} (0.386 sq mi or 247 acres) and river estuaries.

Autreville (French pronunciation: [otʁəvil]) is a commune in the Vosges department in Grand Est in northeastern France.

== See also ==
- Communes of the Vosges department
