= Midrevaux =

- Commune
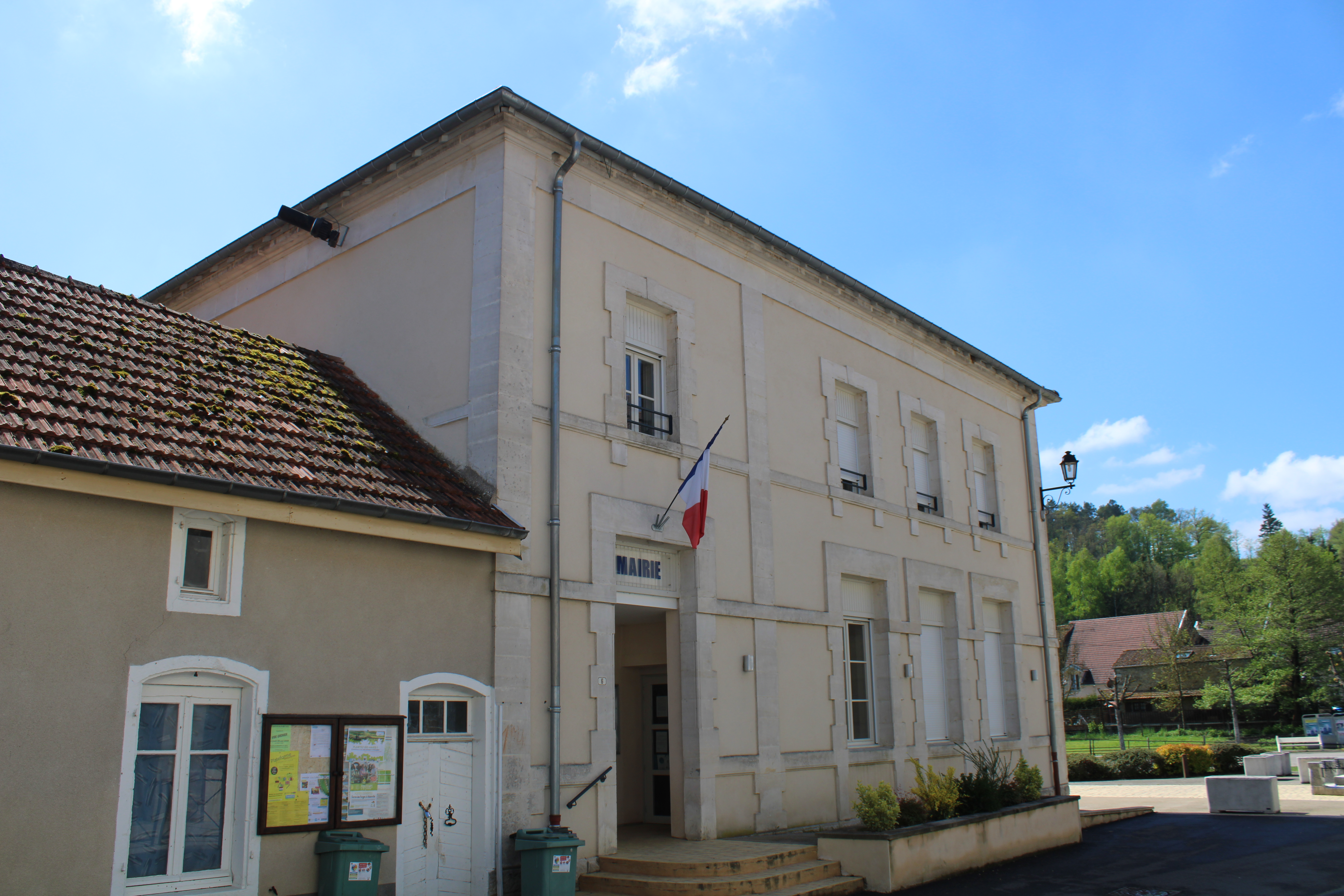
- The town hall in Midrevaux

- Coat of arms
- Location of Midrevaux
- Location within France Location within Grand Est
- Coordinates: 48°23′06″N 5°36′46″E
- Country: France
- Region: Grand Est
- Department: Vosges
- Arrondissement: Neufchâteau
- Canton: Neufchâteau
- Intercommunality: CC Ouest Vosgien

Government
  - Mayor (2020–2026): Bernard Martin
- Area^{1}: 14.29 km^{2} (5.52 sq mi)
- Elevation: 307 m (1,007 ft)
- Highest elevation: 436 m (1,430 ft)
- Lowest elevation: 285 m (935 ft)
- Population (2023): 173
  - Density: 12.1/km^{2} (31.4/sq mi)
- Time zone: UTC+01:00 (CET)
  - Summer (DST): UTC+02:00 (CEST)
- INSEE/Postal code: 88303 /88630
- ^{1} French Land Register data, which excludes lakes, ponds, glaciers > 1 km^{2} (0.386 sq mi or 247 acres) and river estuaries.

Midrevaux (French pronunciation: [midʁəvo]) is a commune in the Vosges department in Grand Est in northeastern France.

Inhabitants are called Midrevalliens.

== Geography ==
The village is positioned on the western edge of the département, a few kilometres to the west of Neufchâteau surrounded by forests, and bordered by the Saônelle, a tributary of the river Meuse.

== See also ==
- Communes of the Vosges department
