= Chermisey =

- Commune
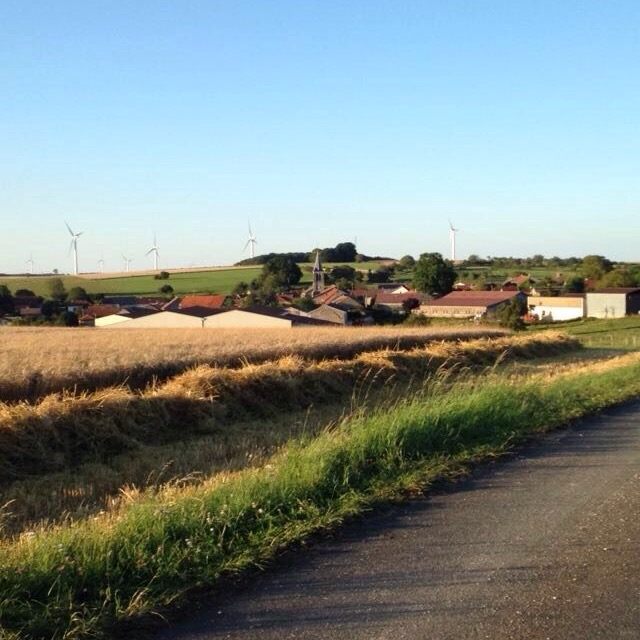
- A general view of Chermisey
- Location of Chermisey
- Location within France Location within Grand Est
- Coordinates: 48°25′04″N 5°34′13″E
- Country: France
- Region: Grand Est
- Department: Vosges
- Arrondissement: Neufchâteau
- Canton: Neufchâteau
- Intercommunality: CC l'Ouest Vosgien

Government
  - Mayor (2020–2026): Francis Baunin
- Area^{1}: 10.75 km^{2} (4.15 sq mi)
- Elevation: 430 m (1,410 ft)
- Highest elevation: 446 m (1,463 ft)
- Lowest elevation: 350 m (1,150 ft)
- Population (2023): 83
  - Density: 7.7/km^{2} (20/sq mi)
- Time zone: UTC+01:00 (CET)
  - Summer (DST): UTC+02:00 (CEST)
- INSEE/Postal code: 88102 /88630
- ^{1} French Land Register data, which excludes lakes, ponds, glaciers > 1 km^{2} (0.386 sq mi or 247 acres) and river estuaries.

Chermisey (French pronunciation: [ʃɛʁmizɛ]) is a commune in the Vosges department in Grand Est in northeastern France.

== See also ==
- Communes of the Vosges department
