= Tranqueville-Graux =

- Commune
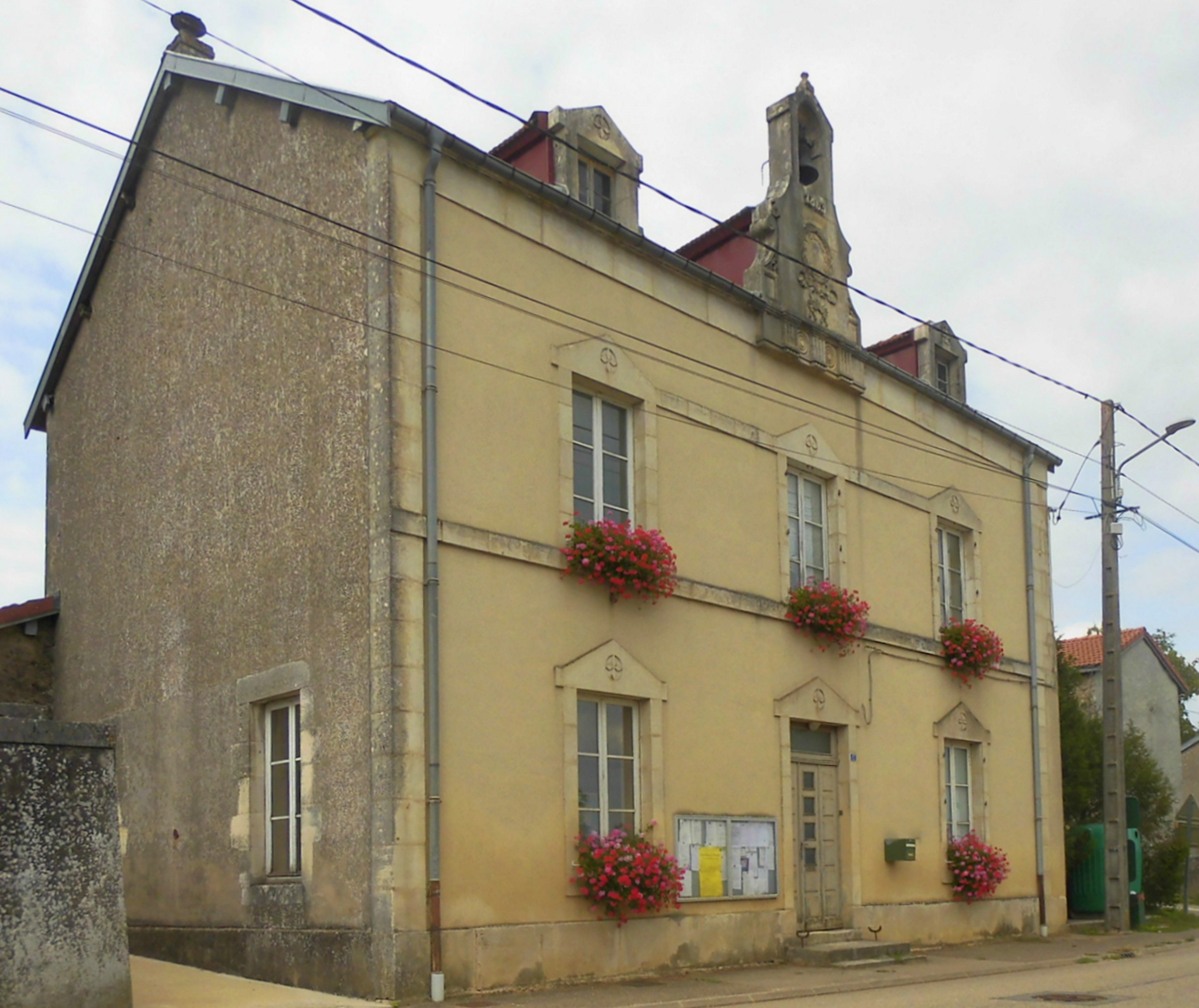
- The town hall in Tranqueville-Graux
- Location of Tranqueville-Graux
- Location within France Location within Grand Est
- Coordinates: 48°26′14″N 5°50′58″E
- Country: France
- Region: Grand Est
- Department: Vosges
- Arrondissement: Neufchâteau
- Canton: Neufchâteau
- Intercommunality: CC l'Ouest Vosgien

Government
  - Mayor (2020–2026): Roxane Cambraye
- Area^{1}: 14.94 km^{2} (5.77 sq mi)
- Elevation: 387 m (1,270 ft)
- Highest elevation: 403 m (1,322 ft)
- Lowest elevation: 313 m (1,027 ft)
- Population (2023): 82
  - Density: 5.5/km^{2} (14/sq mi)
- Time zone: UTC+01:00 (CET)
  - Summer (DST): UTC+02:00 (CEST)
- INSEE/Postal code: 88478 /88300
- ^{1} French Land Register data, which excludes lakes, ponds, glaciers > 1 km^{2} (0.386 sq mi or 247 acres) and river estuaries.

Tranqueville-Graux (French pronunciation: [tʁɑ̃kvil ɡʁo]) is a commune in the Vosges department in Grand Est in northeastern France.

== See also ==
- Communes of the Vosges department
