= Ruppes =

- Commune
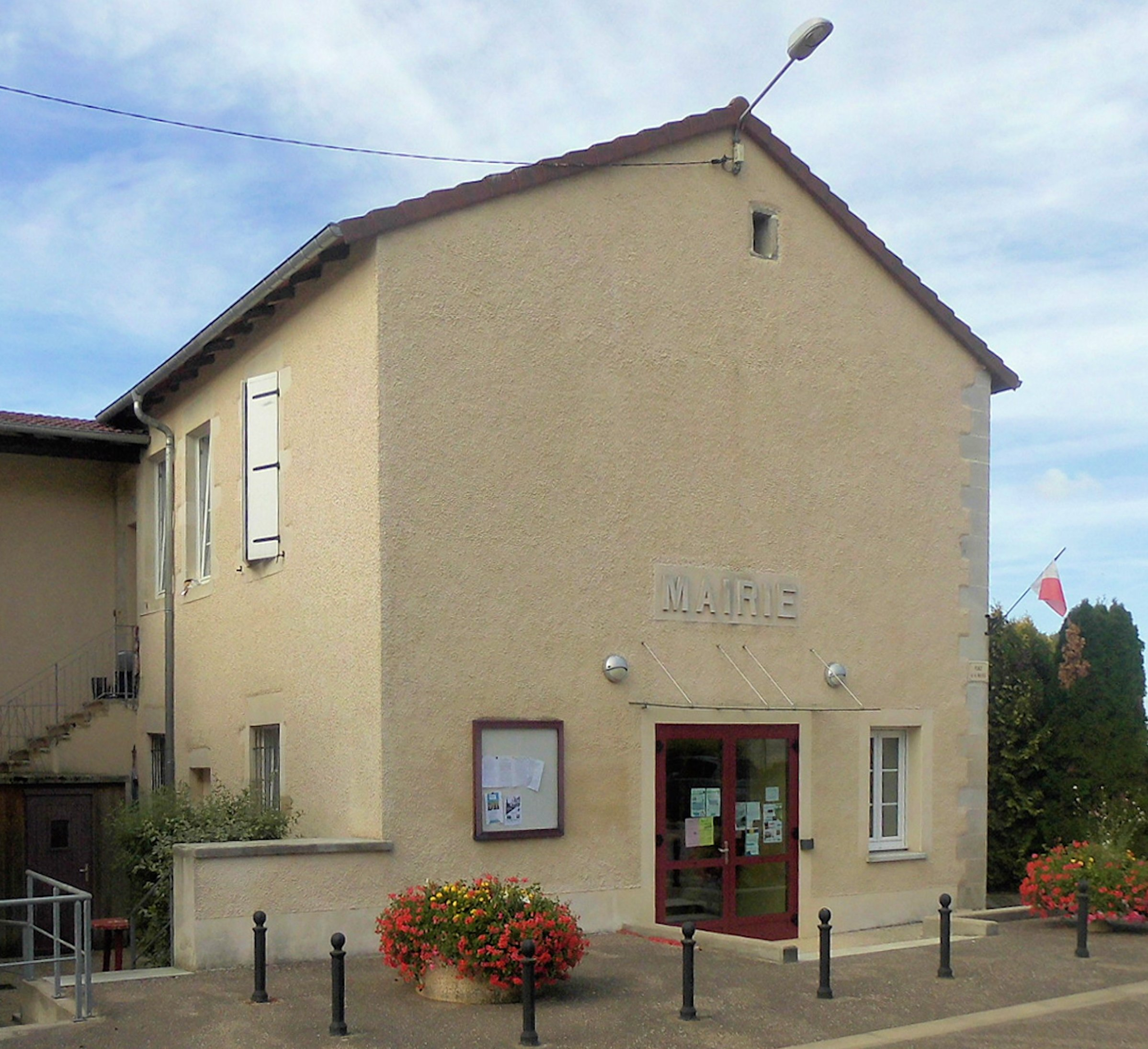
- The town hall in Ruppes

- Coat of arms
- Location of Ruppes
- Location within France Location within Grand Est
- Coordinates: 48°28′19″N 5°46′14″E
- Country: France
- Region: Grand Est
- Department: Vosges
- Arrondissement: Neufchâteau
- Canton: Neufchâteau
- Intercommunality: CC Ouest Vosgien

Government
  - Mayor (2021–2026): Jacques Brelle
- Area^{1}: 7.44 km^{2} (2.87 sq mi)
- Elevation: 298 m (978 ft)
- Highest elevation: 313 m (1,027 ft)
- Lowest elevation: 273 m (896 ft)
- Population (2023): 149
  - Density: 20.0/km^{2} (51.9/sq mi)
- Time zone: UTC+01:00 (CET)
  - Summer (DST): UTC+02:00 (CEST)
- INSEE/Postal code: 88407 /88630
- ^{1} French Land Register data, which excludes lakes, ponds, glaciers > 1 km^{2} (0.386 sq mi or 247 acres) and river estuaries.

Ruppes (French pronunciation: [ʁyp]) is a commune in the Vosges department in Grand Est in northeastern France.

== See also ==
- Communes of the Vosges department
