= Seraumont =

- Commune
- Location of Seraumont
- Location within France Location within Grand Est
- Coordinates: 48°26′03″N 5°35′58″E
- Country: France
- Region: Grand Est
- Department: Vosges
- Arrondissement: Neufchâteau
- Canton: Neufchâteau
- Intercommunality: CC l'Ouest Vosgien

Government
  - Mayor (2020–2026): Claude Clément
- Area^{1}: 10.29 km^{2} (3.97 sq mi)
- Elevation: 340 m (1,120 ft)
- Highest elevation: 438 m (1,437 ft)
- Lowest elevation: 305 m (1,001 ft)
- Population (2023): 33
  - Density: 3.2/km^{2} (8.3/sq mi)
- Time zone: UTC+01:00 (CET)
  - Summer (DST): UTC+02:00 (CEST)
- INSEE/Postal code: 88453 /88630
- ^{1} French Land Register data, which excludes lakes, ponds, glaciers > 1 km^{2} (0.386 sq mi or 247 acres) and river estuaries.

Seraumont (French pronunciation: [səʁomɔ̃]) is a commune in the Vosges department in Grand Est in northeastern France.

== See also ==
- Communes of the Vosges department
