= Sionne =

- Commune
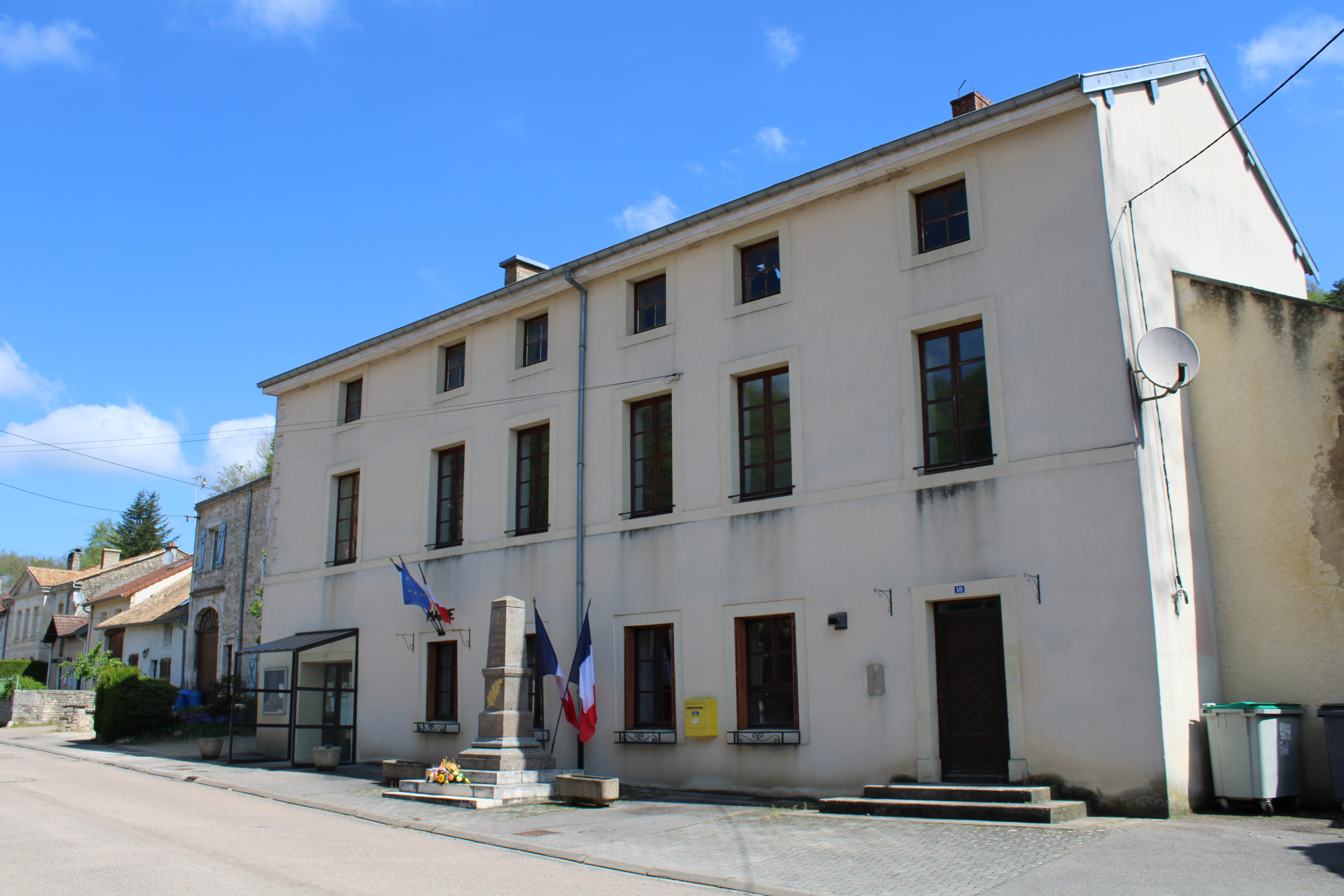
- The town hall in Sionne
- Location of Sionne
- Location within France Location within Grand Est
- Coordinates: 48°23′37″N 5°38′26″E
- Country: France
- Region: Grand Est
- Department: Vosges
- Arrondissement: Neufchâteau
- Canton: Neufchâteau
- Intercommunality: CC l'Ouest Vosgien

Government
  - Mayor (2020–2026): Quentin Labet
- Area^{1}: 11.79 km^{2} (4.55 sq mi)
- Highest elevation: 435 m (1,427 ft)
- Lowest elevation: 274 m (899 ft)
- Population (2023): 139
  - Density: 11.8/km^{2} (30.5/sq mi)
- Time zone: UTC+01:00 (CET)
  - Summer (DST): UTC+02:00 (CEST)
- INSEE/Postal code: 88457 /88630
- ^{1} French Land Register data, which excludes lakes, ponds, glaciers > 1 km^{2} (0.386 sq mi or 247 acres) and river estuaries.

Sionne (French pronunciation: [sjɔn]) is a commune in the Vosges department in Grand Est in northeastern France.

== See also ==
- Communes of the Vosges department
