= Coussey =

- Commune
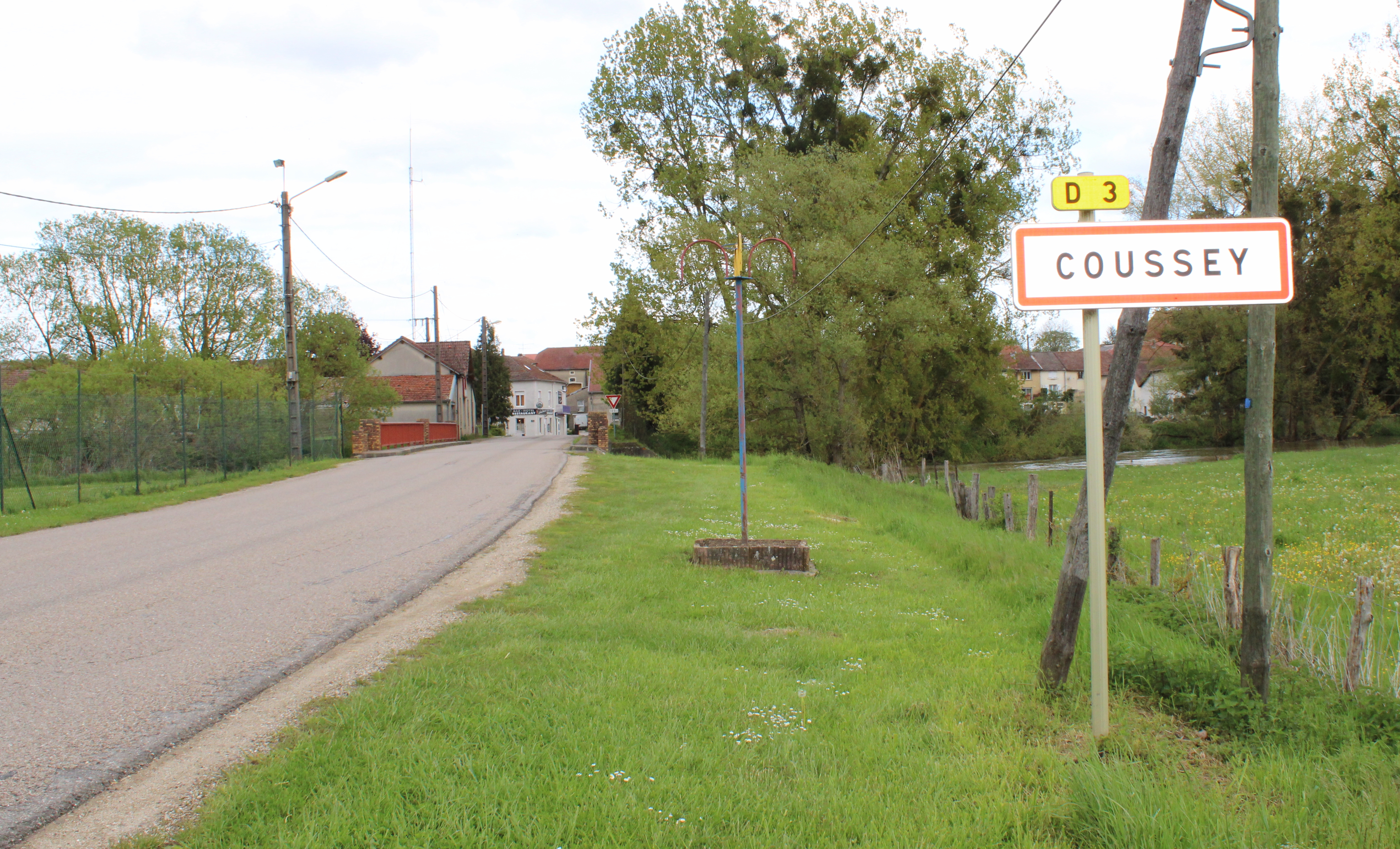
- The road into Coussey

- Flag Coat of arms
- Location of Coussey
- Location within France Location within Grand Est
- Coordinates: 48°24′33″N 5°41′00″E
- Country: France
- Region: Grand Est
- Department: Vosges
- Arrondissement: Neufchâteau
- Canton: Neufchâteau
- Intercommunality: CC l'Ouest Vosgien

Government
  - Mayor (2020–2026): Christophe Coiffier
- Area^{1}: 16.02 km^{2} (6.19 sq mi)
- Elevation: 284 m (932 ft)
- Highest elevation: 422 m (1,385 ft)
- Lowest elevation: 267 m (876 ft)
- Population (2023): 716
  - Density: 44.7/km^{2} (116/sq mi)
- Time zone: UTC+01:00 (CET)
  - Summer (DST): UTC+02:00 (CEST)
- INSEE/Postal code: 88118 /88630
- ^{1} French Land Register data, which excludes lakes, ponds, glaciers > 1 km^{2} (0.386 sq mi or 247 acres) and river estuaries.

Coussey (French pronunciation: [kusɛ]) is a commune in the Vosges department in Grand Est in northeastern France.

== Sights ==
The twelfth-century church of Notre Dame (Our Lady) has a romanesque exterior while the interior is primarily in the Gothic style. Coussey the origins of the Coussey family.

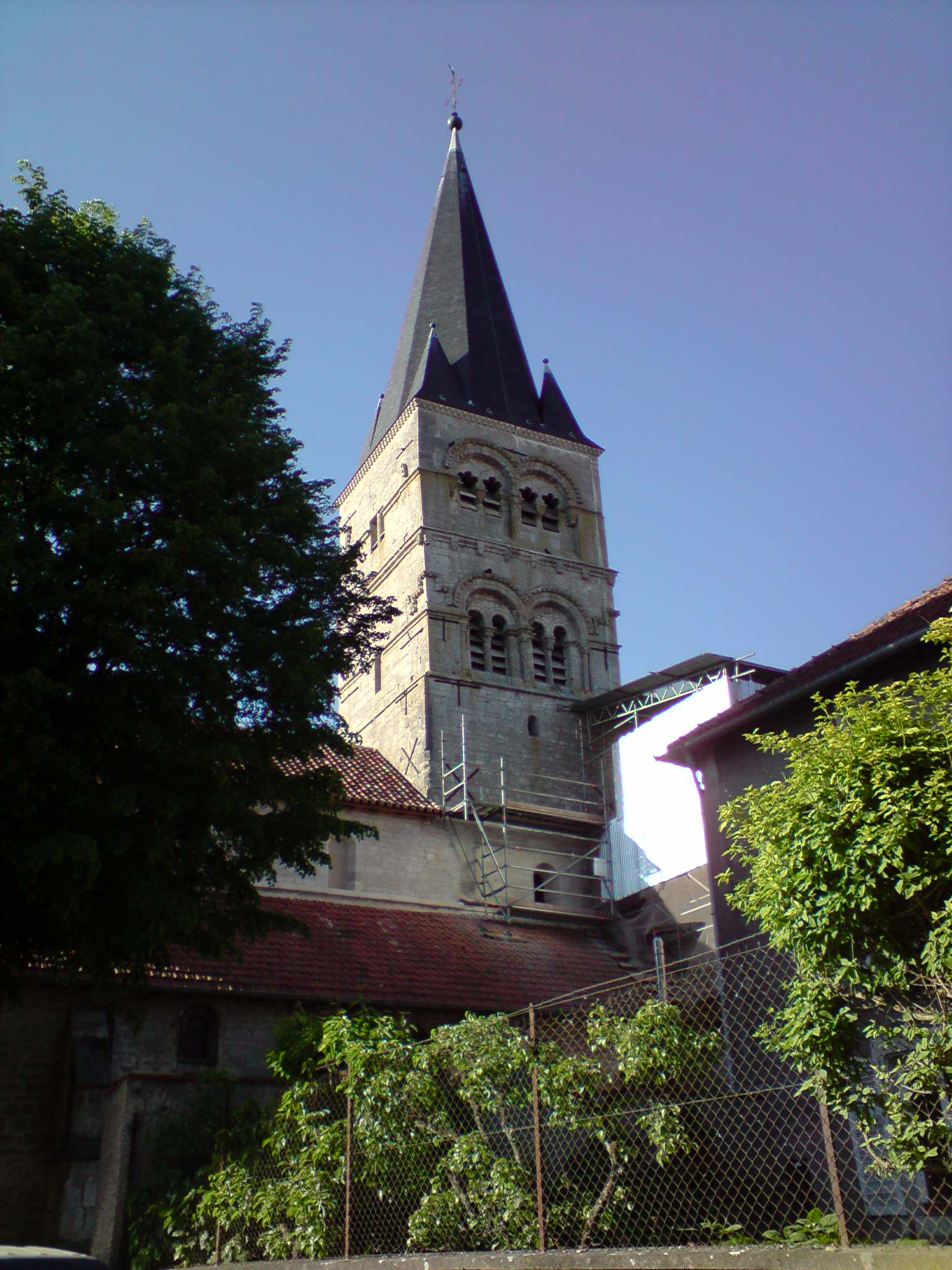

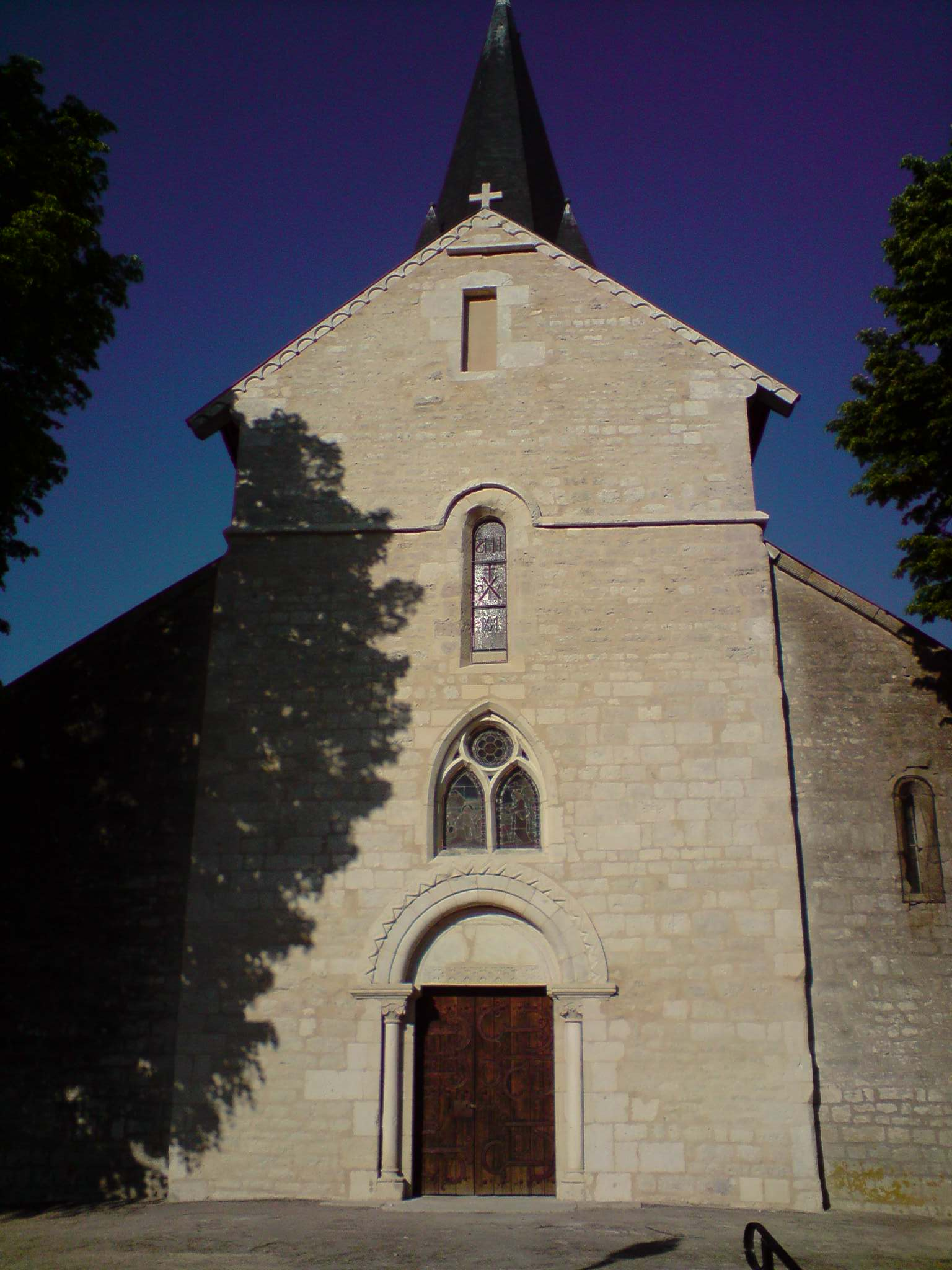

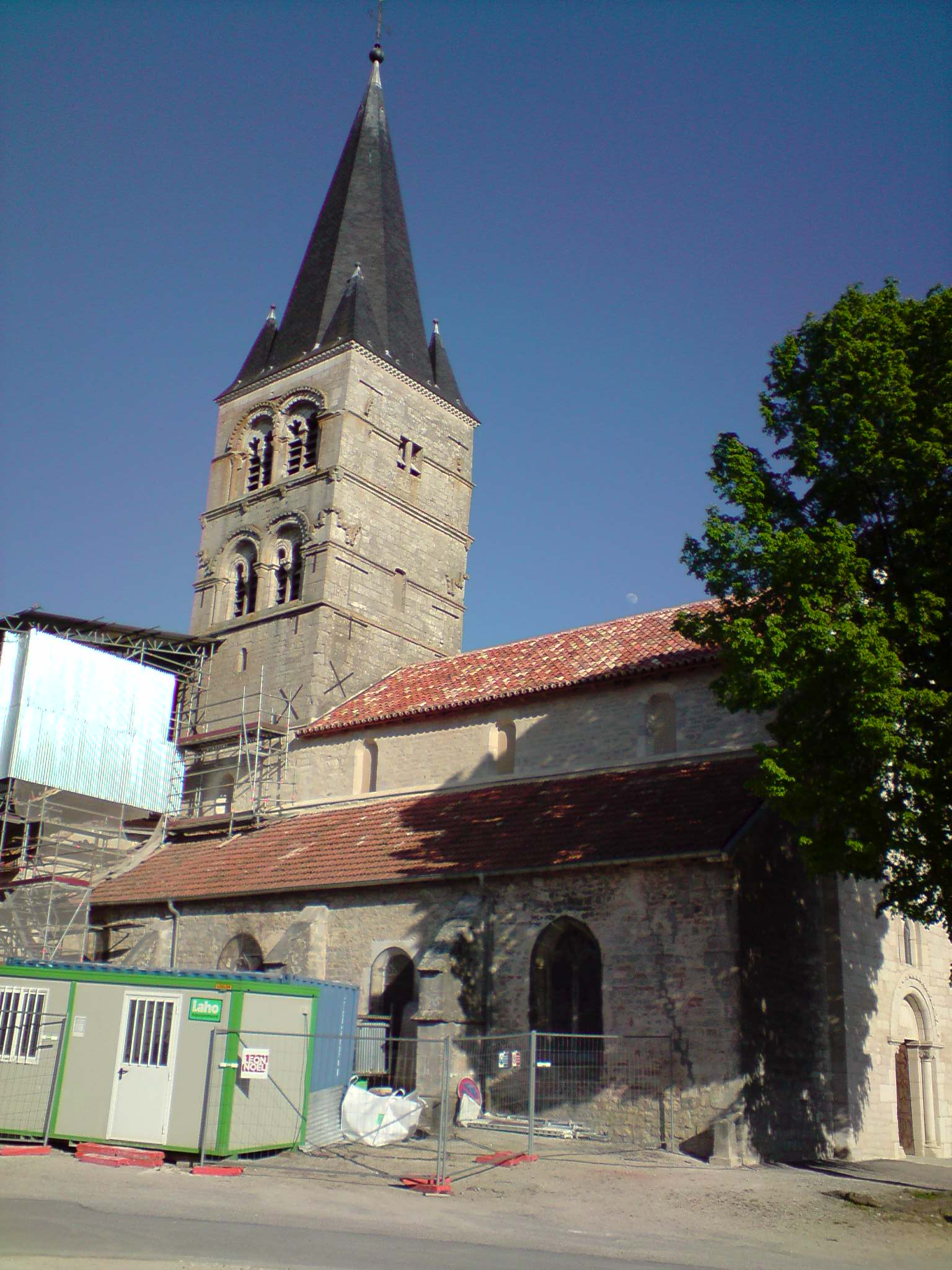

== Personalities ==
- Sir James Henley Coussey, who chaired the Coussey Constitutional Committee set up in December 1949 to draw up a new Constitution for the Gold Coast.

== See also ==
- Communes of the Vosges department
