= Association of middle Moselle communes =

The Association of middle Moselle communes (French: Communauté de communes de la Moyenne Moselle) is a former administrative association of communes in the Vosges département of eastern France and in the region of Lorraine. It was merged into the Communauté d'agglomération d'Épinal in January 2017.

Created on the last day of 1999, but based on an association originally formed in 1966, the association had its administrative offices at Charmes.

== Member communes ==
The Communauté de communes comprised the following communes:

- Avillers
- Avrainville
- Battexey
- Bettoncourt
- Bouxurulles
- Brantigny
- Chamagne
- Charmes
- Damas-aux-Bois
- Essegney
- Évaux-et-Ménil
- Florémont
- Gircourt-lès-Viéville
- Hadigny-les-Verrières
- Haillainville
- Hergugney
- Langley
- Marainville-sur-Madon
- Moriville
- Pont-sur-Madon
- Portieux
- Rapey
- Rehaincourt
- Rugney
- Savigny
- Socourt
- Ubexy
- Varmonzey
- Vincey
- Vomécourt-sur-Madon
- Zincourt

== History ==
The district of the Mid-Moselle (district de la moyenne Moselle) was born in February 1966, its objectives being at that time as follows:

- Promotion of economic development
- Housing improvement
- Attention to environmental problems (which in 1966 was an innovative objective)
- Road maintenance
- Creation of a networked drinking water supply

Following the passing in 1999 of the Chevènement Law of 1999, the district of the Mid-Moselle transformed itself into the Association of middle Moselle communes. The association was founded either on the final day of 1999 or on the first day of 2000 (sources differ).

In addition to the name change, the new millennium also marked a total change of objectives, because of the way in which an administrative grouping was transformed into a true project driven community of communes (communauté de projet) in terms of the entities named communautés de communes under the statute of 1992.
