= Canton of Charmes =

Coordinates: 48°22′17″N 6°17′37″E

Charmes
- Canton
- Country: France
- Region: Grand Est
- Department: Vosges
- No. of communes: {{{nbcomm}}}
- Area: 421.81 km^{2} (162.86 sq mi)
- Population (2023): 20,439
  - Density: 48.455/km^{2} (125.50/sq mi)
- INSEE code: 88 03

The Canton of Charmes is a French administrative and electoral grouping of communes in the Vosges département of eastern France and in the region of Grand Est. The canton has its administrative centre at Charmes.

== Composition ==
At the French canton reorganisation which came into effect in March 2015, the canton was expanded from 26 to 52 communes:

- Avillers
- Avrainville
- Battexey
- Bettegney-Saint-Brice
- Bettoncourt
- Bouxières-aux-Bois
- Bouxurulles
- Brantigny
- Bult
- Chamagne
- Charmes
- Châtel-sur-Moselle
- Clézentaine
- Damas-aux-Bois
- Deinvillers
- Derbamont
- Essegney
- Évaux-et-Ménil
- Fauconcourt
- Florémont
- Gircourt-lès-Viéville
- Gugney-aux-Aulx
- Hadigny-les-Verrières
- Haillainville
- Hardancourt
- Hergugney
- Jorxey
- Langley
- Madegney
- Marainville-sur-Madon
- Moriville
- Moyemont
- Nomexy
- Ortoncourt
- Pont-sur-Madon
- Portieux
- Rapey
- Regney
- Rehaincourt
- Romont
- Rugney
- Saint-Genest
- Saint-Maurice-sur-Mortagne
- Saint-Vallier
- Savigny
- Socourt
- Ubexy
- Varmonzey
- Vincey
- Vomécourt
- Vomécourt-sur-Madon
- Xaronval
