= Bouxières-aux-Bois =

- Commune
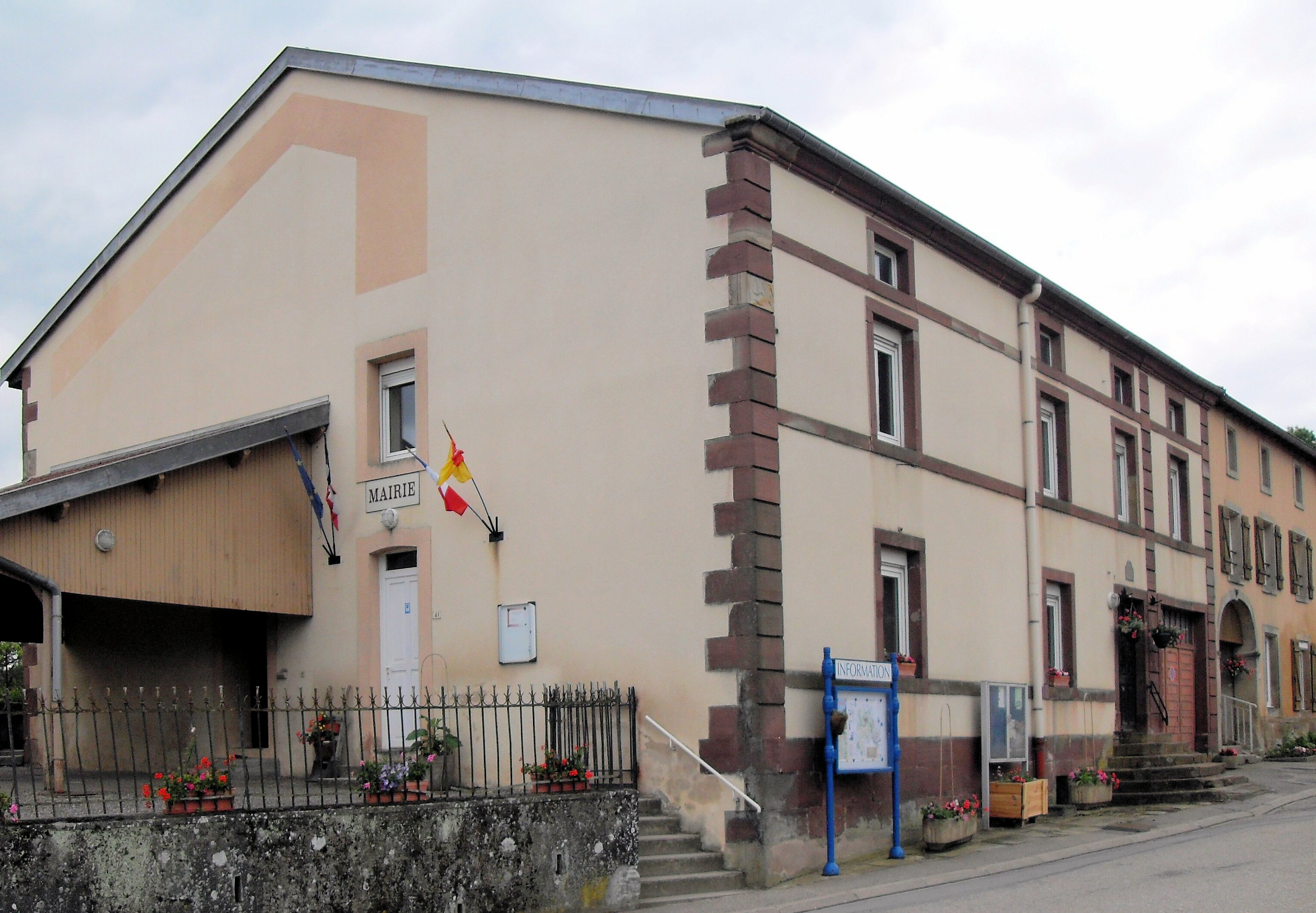
- The town hall in Bouxières-aux-Bois
- Location of Bouxières-aux-Bois
- Location within France Location within Grand Est
- Coordinates: 48°15′52″N 6°19′04″E
- Country: France
- Region: Grand Est
- Department: Vosges
- Arrondissement: Neufchâteau
- Canton: Charmes
- Intercommunality: CC Mirecourt Dompaire

Government
  - Mayor (2020–2026): Philippe Perrein
- Area^{1}: 7.68 km^{2} (2.97 sq mi)
- Elevation: 372 m (1,220 ft)
- Highest elevation: 443 m (1,453 ft)
- Lowest elevation: 339 m (1,112 ft)
- Population (2023): 149
  - Density: 19.4/km^{2} (50.2/sq mi)
- Time zone: UTC+01:00 (CET)
  - Summer (DST): UTC+02:00 (CEST)
- INSEE/Postal code: 88069 /88270
- ^{1} French Land Register data, which excludes lakes, ponds, glaciers > 1 km^{2} (0.386 sq mi or 247 acres) and river estuaries.

Bouxières-aux-Bois is a commune in the Vosges department in Grand Est in northeastern France.

== See also ==
- Communes of the Vosges department
