= Jorxey =

- Commune
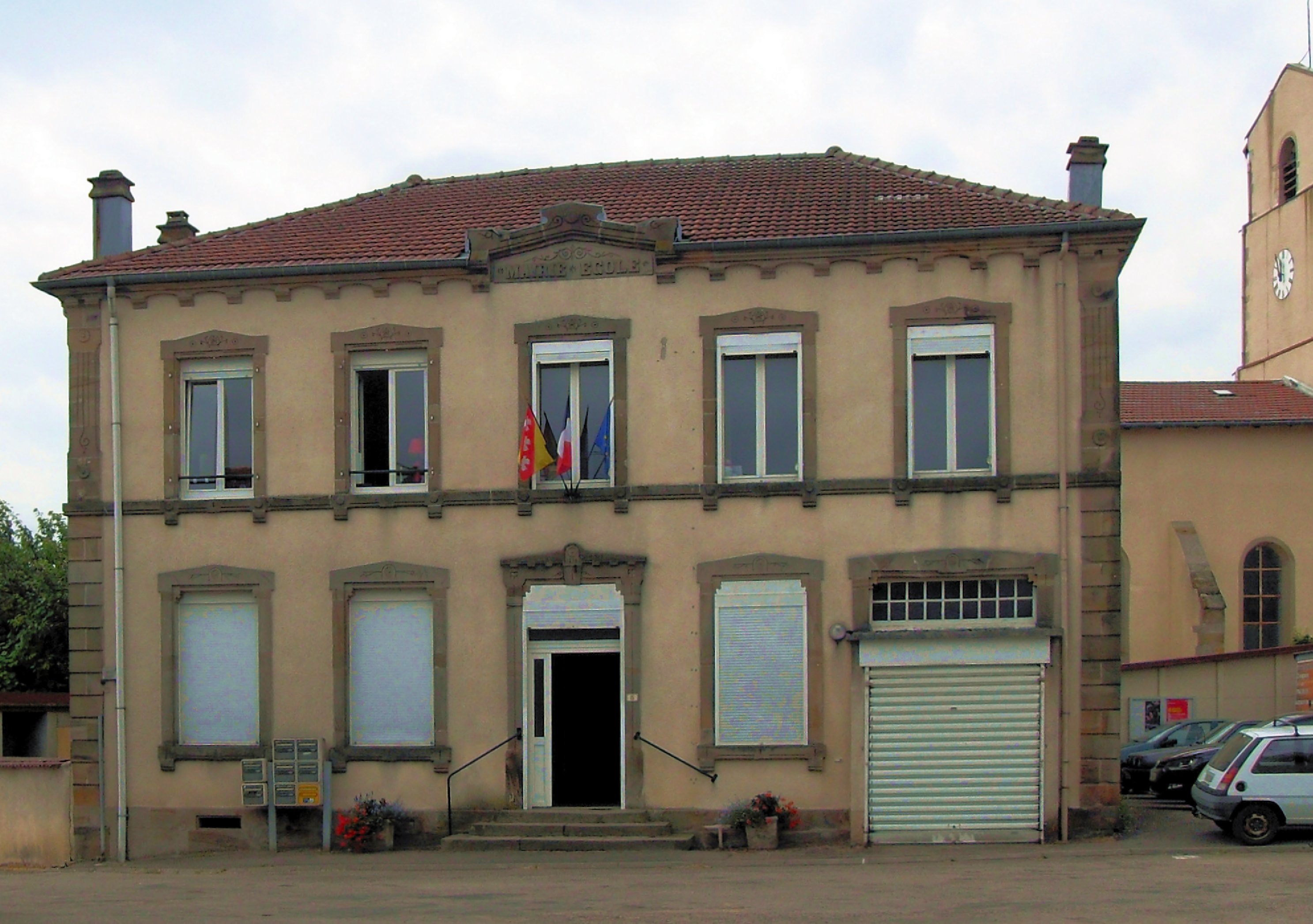
- The town hall in Jorxey
- Location of Jorxey
- Location within France Location within Grand Est
- Coordinates: 48°18′13″N 6°14′19″E
- Country: France
- Region: Grand Est
- Department: Vosges
- Arrondissement: Neufchâteau
- Canton: Charmes
- Intercommunality: CC Mirecourt Dompaire

Government
  - Mayor (2020–2026): Philippe Cherpitel
- Area^{1}: 5.4 km^{2} (2.1 sq mi)
- Highest elevation: 421 m (1,381 ft)
- Lowest elevation: 305 m (1,001 ft)
- Population (2023): 81
  - Density: 15/km^{2} (39/sq mi)
- Time zone: UTC+01:00 (CET)
  - Summer (DST): UTC+02:00 (CEST)
- INSEE/Postal code: 88254 /88500
- ^{1} French Land Register data, which excludes lakes, ponds, glaciers > 1 km^{2} (0.386 sq mi or 247 acres) and river estuaries.

Jorxey is a commune in the Vosges department. It is located in Grand Est in northeastern France.

== See also ==
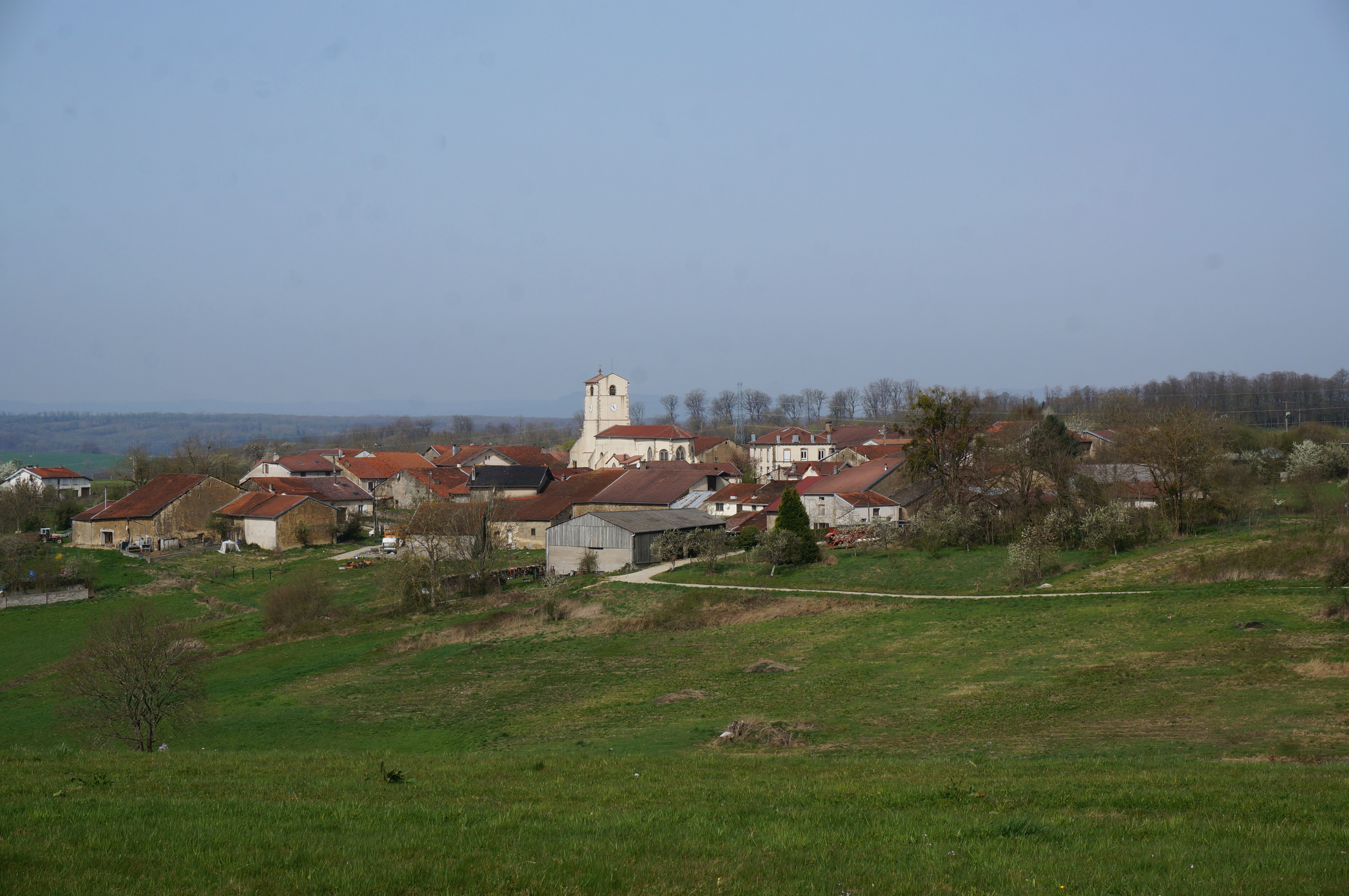

- Communes of the Vosges department
