= Xaronval =

- Commune
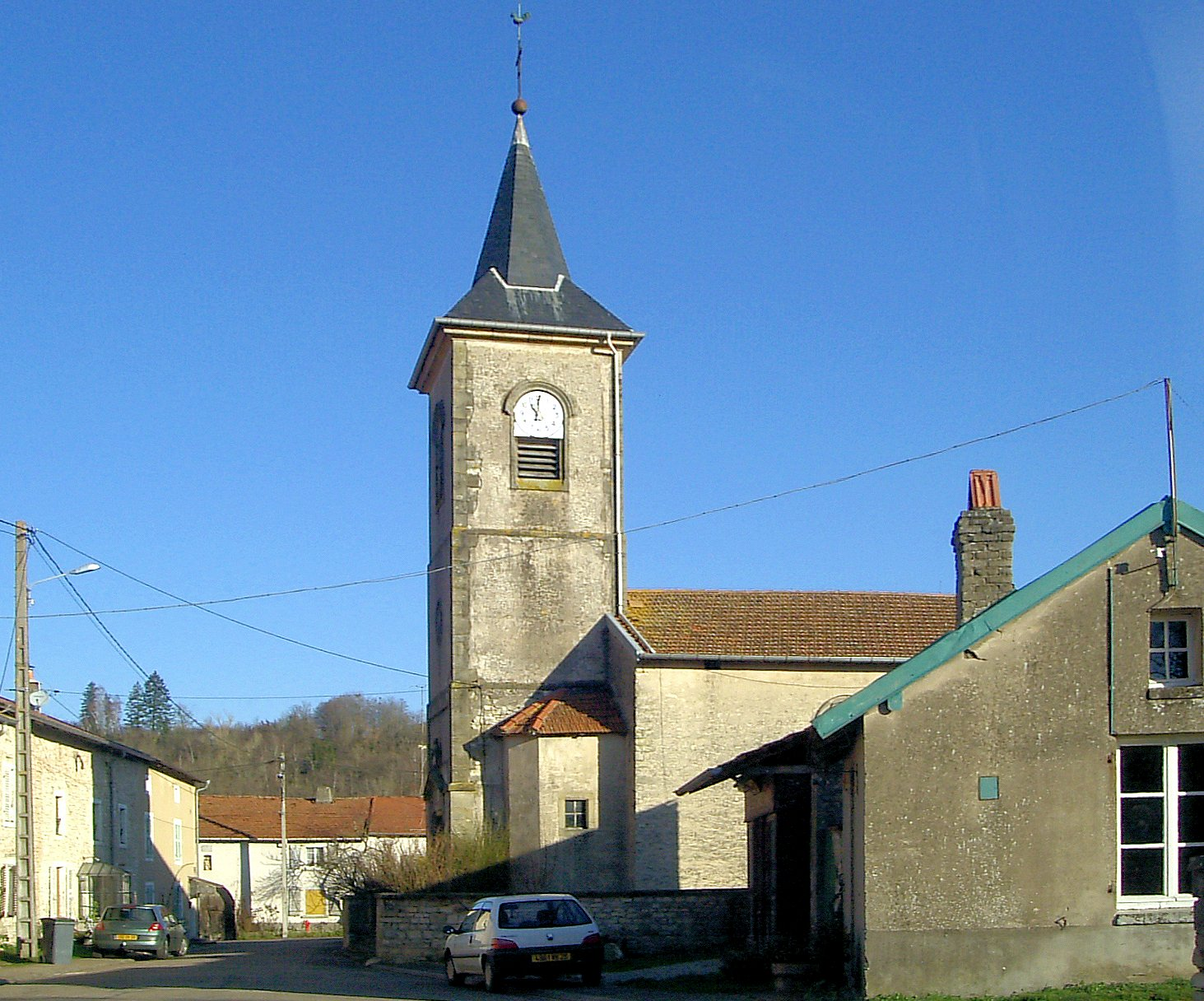
- Saint-Nicolas

- Coat of arms
- Location of Xaronval
- Location within France Location within Grand Est
- Coordinates: 48°22′34″N 6°11′19″E
- Country: France
- Region: Grand Est
- Department: Vosges
- Arrondissement: Neufchâteau
- Canton: Charmes
- Intercommunality: Mirecourt Dompaire

Government
  - Mayor (2020–2026): Cédric Menetrier
- Area^{1}: 5.25 km^{2} (2.03 sq mi)
- Elevation: 270 m (890 ft)
- Highest elevation: 329 m (1,079 ft)
- Lowest elevation: 250 m (820 ft)
- Population (2023): 107
  - Density: 20.4/km^{2} (52.8/sq mi)
- Time zone: UTC+01:00 (CET)
  - Summer (DST): UTC+02:00 (CEST)
- INSEE/Postal code: 88529 /88130
- ^{1} French Land Register data, which excludes lakes, ponds, glaciers > 1 km^{2} (0.386 sq mi or 247 acres) and river estuaries.

Xaronval (French pronunciation: [ksaʁɔ̃val] or [ʃaʁɔ̃val]) is a commune in the Vosges department in Grand Est in northeastern France.

== Population ==
Historical population
| Year | Pop. | ±% p.a. |
|---|---|---|
| 1968 | 93 | — |
| 1975 | 84 | −1.44% |
| 1982 | 66 | −3.39% |
| 1990 | 67 | +0.19% |
| 1999 | 67 | +0.00% |
| 2007 | 83 | +2.71% |
| 2012 | 94 | +2.52% |
| 2017 | 106 | +2.43% |
| 2023 | 107 | +0.16% |
Source: INSEE

== Geography ==
The river Madon flows through the commune.

== See also ==
- Communes of the Vosges department
