= Madegney =

- Commune
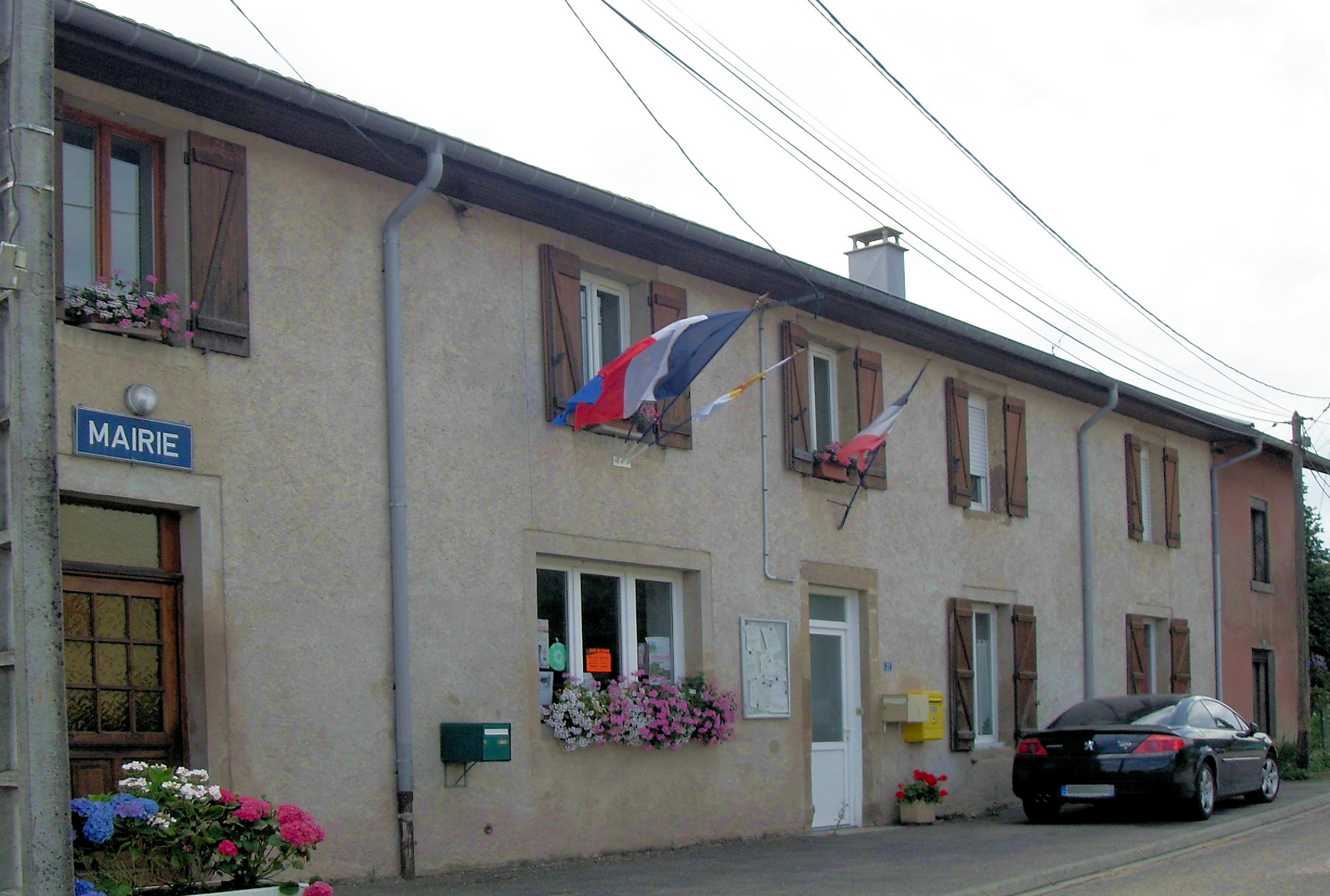
- The town hall in Madegney
- Location of Madegney
- Location within France Location within Grand Est
- Coordinates: 48°17′19″N 6°17′20″E
- Country: France
- Region: Grand Est
- Department: Vosges
- Arrondissement: Neufchâteau
- Canton: Charmes
- Intercommunality: CC Mirecourt Dompaire

Government
  - Mayor (2020–2026): Thierry Chapelier
- Area^{1}: 3.05 km^{2} (1.18 sq mi)
- Elevation: 340 m (1,120 ft)
- Highest elevation: 423 m (1,388 ft)
- Lowest elevation: 309 m (1,014 ft)
- Population (2023): 117
  - Density: 38.4/km^{2} (99.4/sq mi)
- Time zone: UTC+01:00 (CET)
  - Summer (DST): UTC+02:00 (CEST)
- INSEE/Postal code: 88280 /88450
- ^{1} French Land Register data, which excludes lakes, ponds, glaciers > 1 km^{2} (0.386 sq mi or 247 acres) and river estuaries.

Madegney (French pronunciation: [madɲɛ]) is a commune in the Vosges department in Grand Est in northeastern France.

== See also ==
- Communes of the Vosges department
