= Bettegney-Saint-Brice =

- Commune
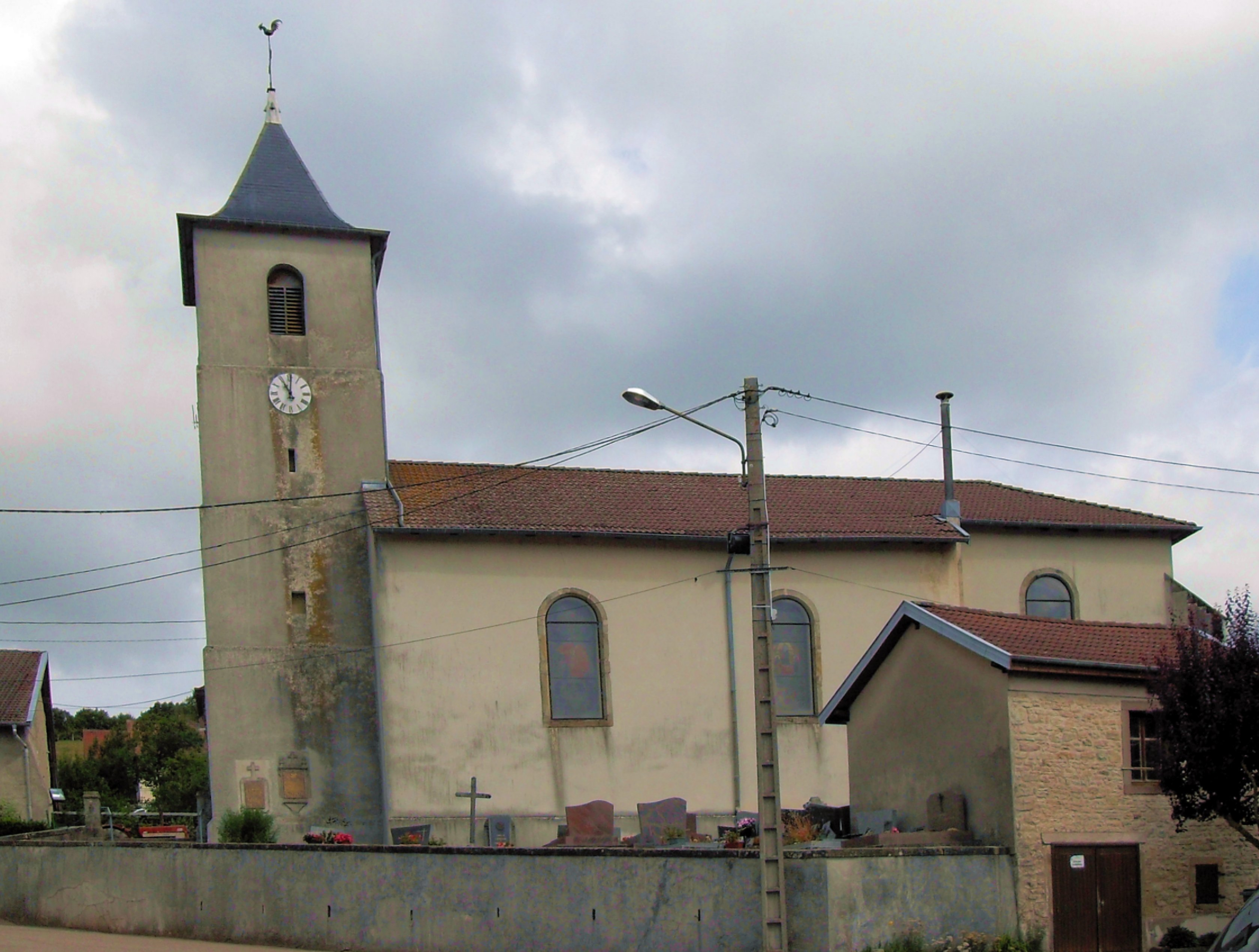
- The church in Bettegney-Saint-Brice
- Location of Bettegney-Saint-Brice
- Location within France Location within Grand Est
- Coordinates: 48°18′00″N 6°18′28″E
- Country: France
- Region: Grand Est
- Department: Vosges
- Arrondissement: Neufchâteau
- Canton: Charmes
- Intercommunality: CC Mirecourt Dompaire

Government
  - Mayor (2020–2026): Jean François Virion
- Area^{1}: 5.32 km^{2} (2.05 sq mi)
- Elevation: 330 m (1,080 ft)
- Highest elevation: 437 m (1,434 ft)
- Lowest elevation: 304 m (997 ft)
- Population (2023): 163
  - Density: 30.6/km^{2} (79.4/sq mi)
- Time zone: UTC+01:00 (CET)
  - Summer (DST): UTC+02:00 (CEST)
- INSEE/Postal code: 88055 /88450
- ^{1} French Land Register data, which excludes lakes, ponds, glaciers > 1 km^{2} (0.386 sq mi or 247 acres) and river estuaries.

Bettegney-Saint-Brice (French pronunciation: [bɛtɲɛ sɛ̃ bʁis]) is a commune in the Vosges department in Grand Est in northeastern France.

== See also ==
- Communes of the Vosges department
