= Derbamont =

- Commune
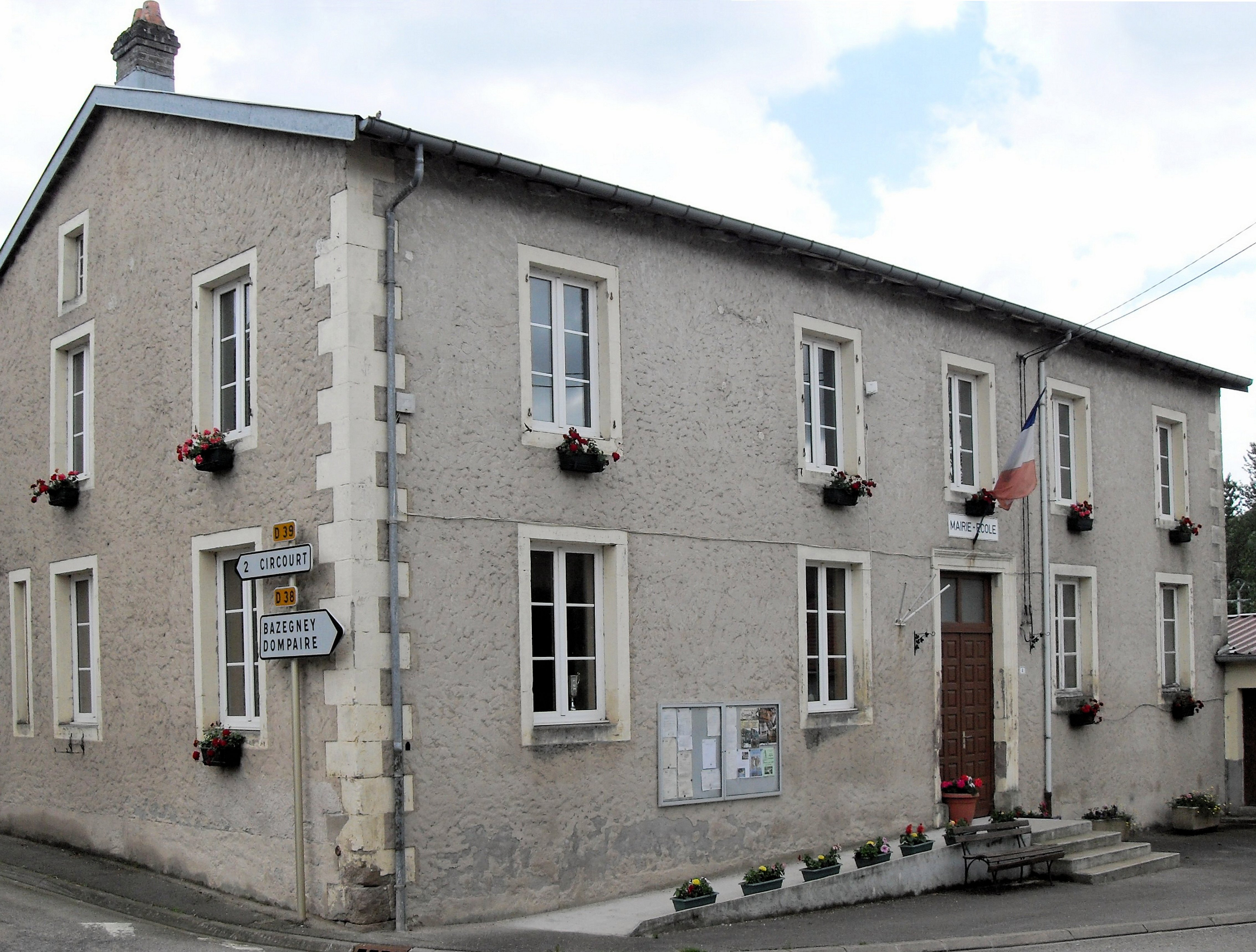
- The town hall and school in Derbamont
- Location of Derbamont
- Location within France Location within Grand Est
- Coordinates: 48°16′09″N 6°16′05″E
- Country: France
- Region: Grand Est
- Department: Vosges
- Arrondissement: Neufchâteau
- Canton: Charmes
- Intercommunality: CC Mirecourt Dompaire

Government
  - Mayor (2020–2026): Christian Vaillant
- Area^{1}: 6.83 km^{2} (2.64 sq mi)
- Highest elevation: 414 m (1,358 ft)
- Lowest elevation: 294 m (965 ft)
- Population (2023): 100
  - Density: 15/km^{2} (38/sq mi)
- Time zone: UTC+01:00 (CET)
  - Summer (DST): UTC+02:00 (CEST)
- INSEE/Postal code: 88129 /88270
- ^{1} French Land Register data, which excludes lakes, ponds, glaciers > 1 km^{2} (0.386 sq mi or 247 acres) and river estuaries.

Derbamont (French pronunciation: [dɛʁbamɔ̃]) is a commune in the Vosges department in Grand Est in northeastern France.

== See also ==
- Communes of the Vosges department
