= Hergugney =

- Commune
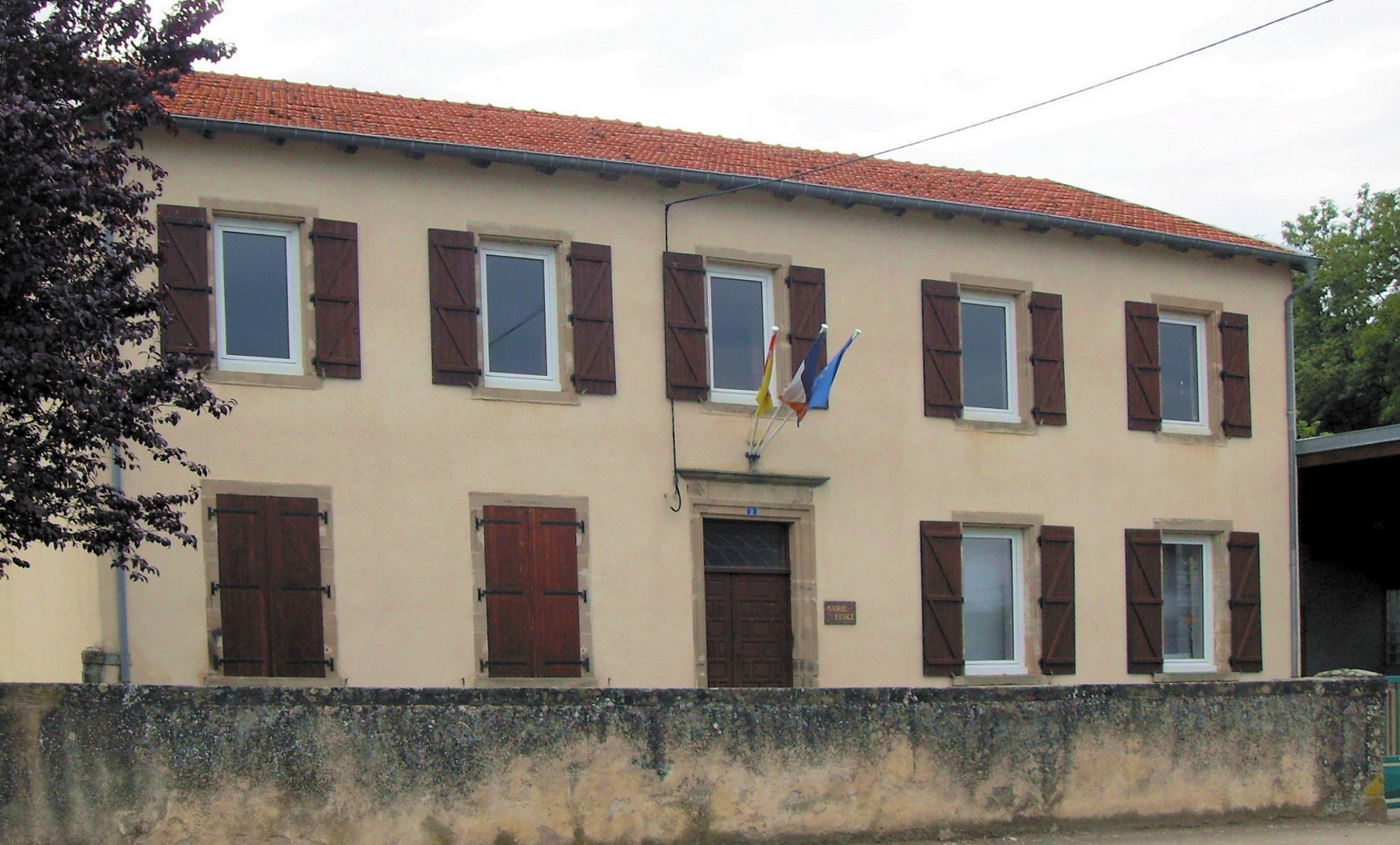
- The town hall and school in Hergugney

- Coat of arms
- Location of Hergugney
- Location within France Location within Grand Est
- Coordinates: 48°23′16″N 6°12′05″E
- Country: France
- Region: Grand Est
- Department: Vosges
- Arrondissement: Épinal
- Canton: Charmes
- Intercommunality: CA Épinal

Government
  - Mayor (2020–2026): Jean-Luc Thiery
- Area^{1}: 5.46 km^{2} (2.11 sq mi)
- Elevation: 276 m (906 ft)
- Highest elevation: 382 m (1,253 ft)
- Lowest elevation: 26 m (85 ft)
- Population (2023): 134
  - Density: 24.5/km^{2} (63.6/sq mi)
- Time zone: UTC+01:00 (CET)
  - Summer (DST): UTC+02:00 (CEST)
- INSEE/Postal code: 88239 /88130
- ^{1} French Land Register data, which excludes lakes, ponds, glaciers > 1 km^{2} (0.386 sq mi or 247 acres) and river estuaries.

Hergugney (French pronunciation: [ɛʁɡyɲɛ]) is a commune in the Vosges department in Grand Est in northeastern France.

== See also ==
- Communes of the Vosges department
