= Rehaincourt =

- Commune
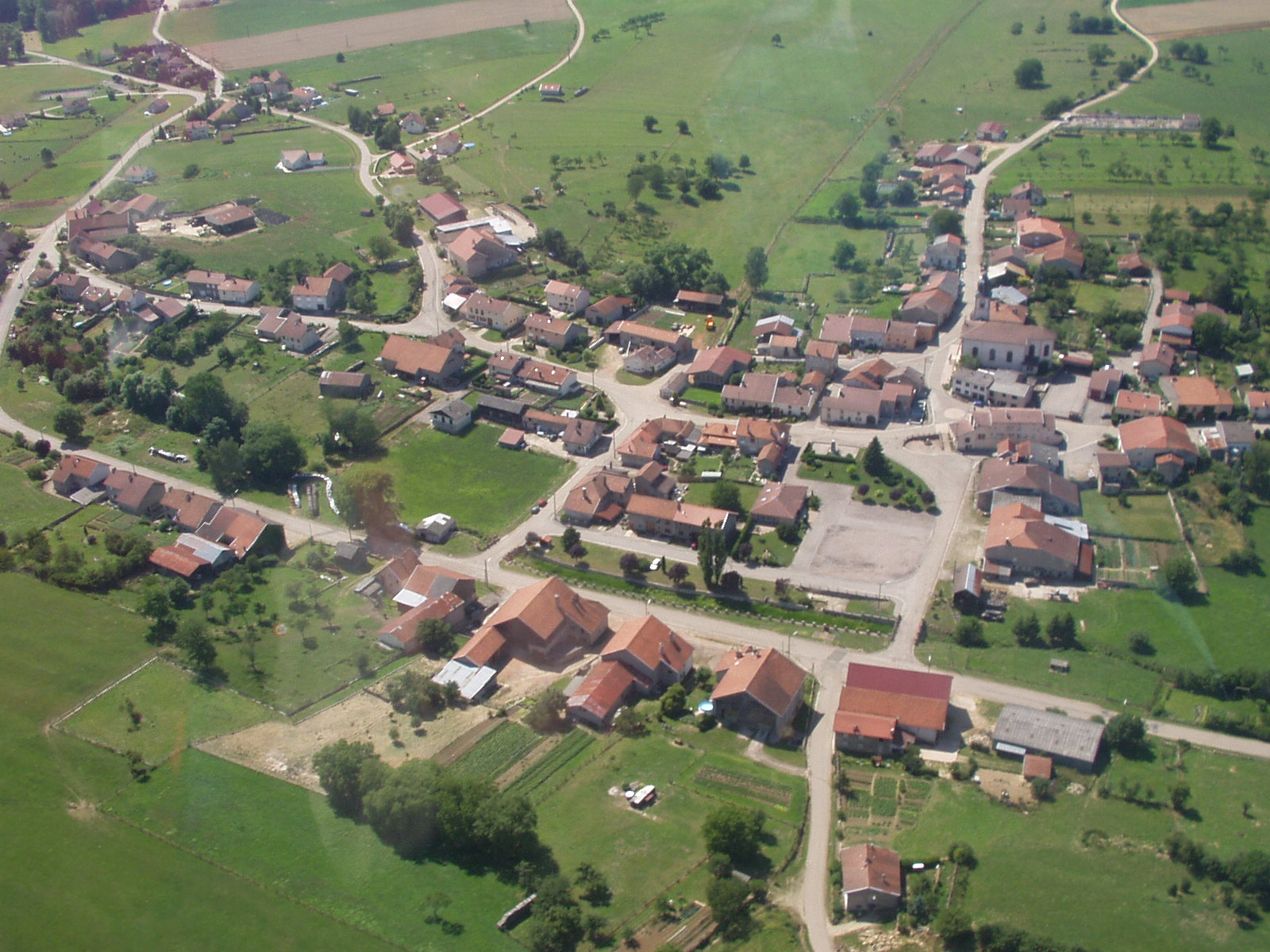
- An aerial view of Rehaincourt
- Location of Rehaincourt
- Location within France Location within Grand Est
- Coordinates: 48°21′46″N 6°28′12″E
- Country: France
- Region: Grand Est
- Department: Vosges
- Arrondissement: Épinal
- Canton: Charmes
- Intercommunality: CA Épinal

Government
  - Mayor (2020–2026): André Gambrelle
- Area^{1}: 15.22 km^{2} (5.88 sq mi)
- Elevation: 330 m (1,080 ft)
- Highest elevation: 390 m (1,280 ft)
- Lowest elevation: 314 m (1,030 ft)
- Population (2023): 364
  - Density: 23.9/km^{2} (61.9/sq mi)
- Time zone: UTC+01:00 (CET)
  - Summer (DST): UTC+02:00 (CEST)
- INSEE/Postal code: 88379 /88330
- ^{1} French Land Register data, which excludes lakes, ponds, glaciers > 1 km^{2} (0.386 sq mi or 247 acres) and river estuaries.

Rehaincourt (French pronunciation: [ʁə.ɛ̃kuʁ]) is a commune in the Vosges department in Grand Est in northeastern France.

== See also ==
- Communes of the Vosges department
