= Haillainville =

- Commune
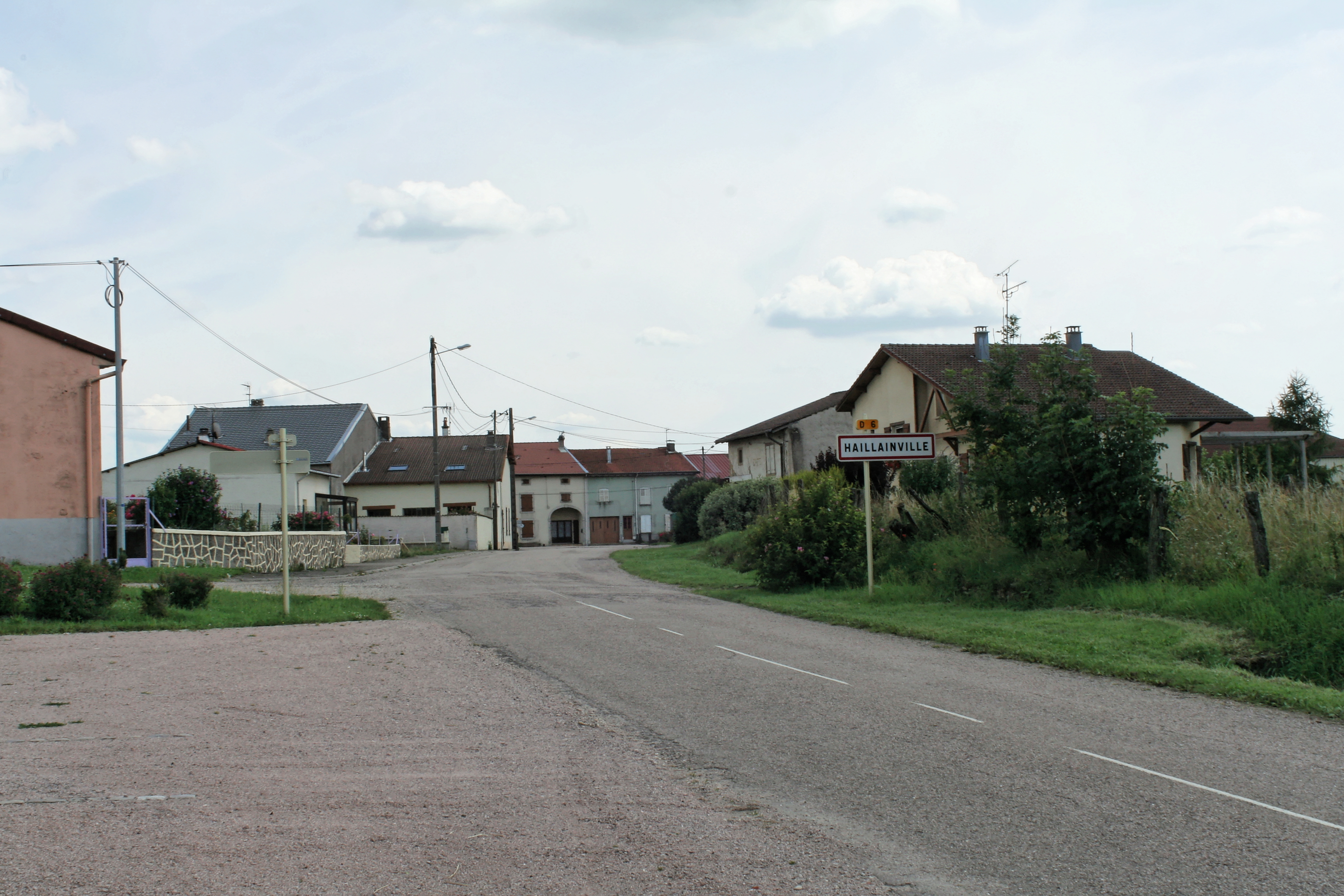
- The road into Haillainville

- Coat of arms
- Location of Haillainville
- Location within France Location within Grand Est
- Coordinates: 48°23′37″N 6°28′58″E
- Country: France
- Region: Grand Est
- Department: Vosges
- Arrondissement: Épinal
- Canton: Charmes
- Intercommunality: CA Épinal

Government
  - Mayor (2020–2026): Bernard Laurent
- Area^{1}: 12.26 km^{2} (4.73 sq mi)
- Elevation: 324 m (1,063 ft)
- Highest elevation: 381 m (1,250 ft)
- Lowest elevation: 293 m (961 ft)
- Population (2023): 181
  - Density: 14.8/km^{2} (38.2/sq mi)
- Time zone: UTC+01:00 (CET)
  - Summer (DST): UTC+02:00 (CEST)
- INSEE/Postal code: 88228 /88330
- ^{1} French Land Register data, which excludes lakes, ponds, glaciers > 1 km^{2} (0.386 sq mi or 247 acres) and river estuaries.

Haillainville (French pronunciation: [ajɛ̃vil]) is a commune in the Vosges department in Grand Est in northeastern France. The village lies on either side of a watershed between the Meurthe and Moselle watersheds. This boundary runs just beyond the Route d'Essey crossroads, on the Clézentaine side.

== See also ==
- Communes of the Vosges department
