= Bettoncourt =

- Commune
- Coat of arms
- Location of Bettoncourt
- Location within France Location within Grand Est
- Coordinates: 48°20′59″N 6°09′42″E
- Country: France
- Region: Grand Est
- Department: Vosges
- Arrondissement: Neufchâteau
- Canton: Charmes
- Intercommunality: CC Mirecourt Dompaire

Government
  - Mayor (2020–2026): Jean-Marie Brégeot
- Area^{1}: 3.18 km^{2} (1.23 sq mi)
- Elevation: 258 m (846 ft)
- Highest elevation: 374 m (1,227 ft)
- Lowest elevation: 253 m (830 ft)
- Population (2023): 88
  - Density: 28/km^{2} (72/sq mi)
- Time zone: UTC+01:00 (CET)
  - Summer (DST): UTC+02:00 (CEST)
- INSEE/Postal code: 88056 /88500
- ^{1} French Land Register data, which excludes lakes, ponds, glaciers > 1 km^{2} (0.386 sq mi or 247 acres) and river estuaries.

Bettoncourt (French pronunciation: [bɛtɔ̃kuʁ]) is a commune in the Vosges department in Grand Est in northeastern France.

== Geography ==
The river Madon flows through the commune.

== See also ==
- Communes of the Vosges department
