= Socourt =

- Commune
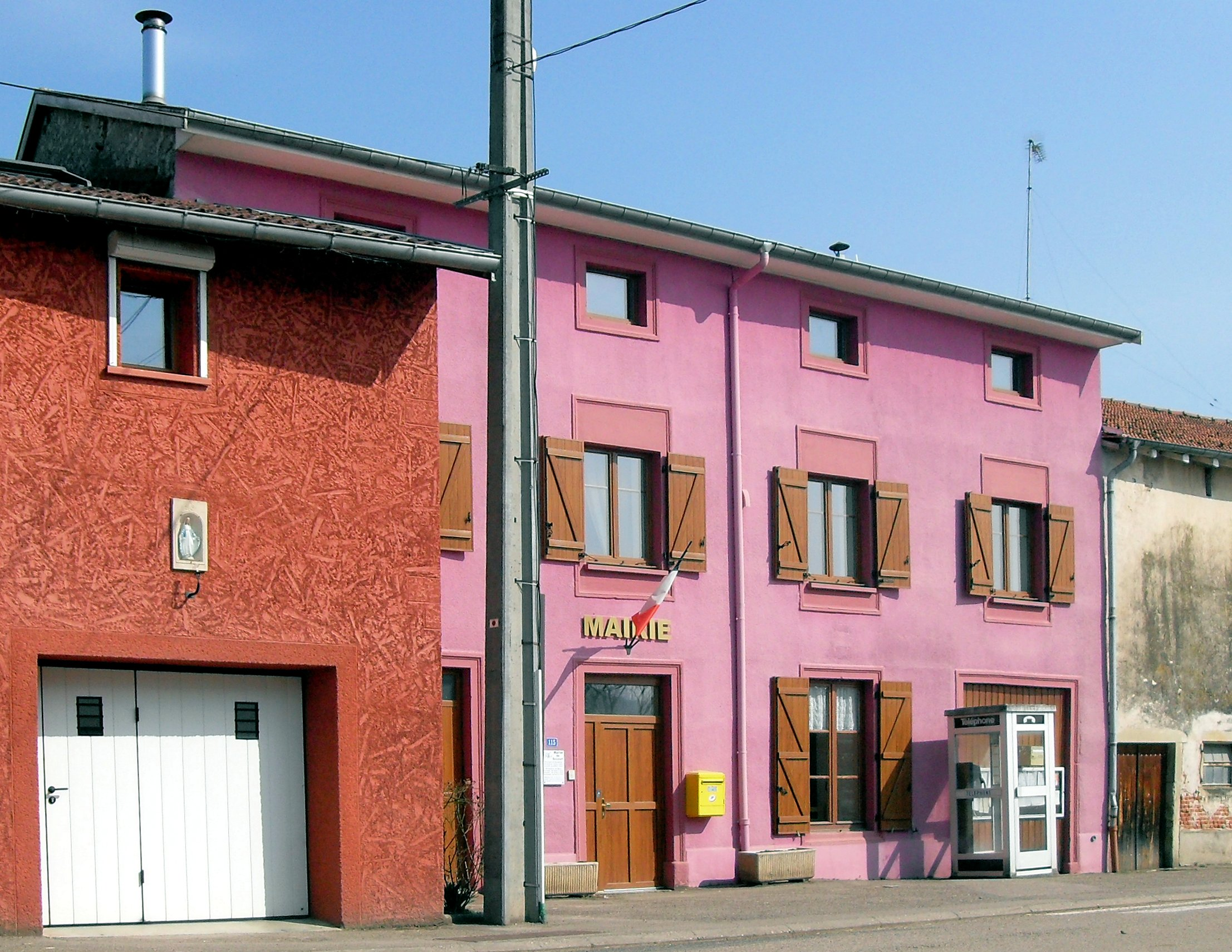
- The town hall in Socourt
- Location of Socourt
- Location within France Location within Grand Est
- Coordinates: 48°23′51″N 6°14′59″E
- Country: France
- Region: Grand Est
- Department: Vosges
- Arrondissement: Épinal
- Canton: Charmes
- Intercommunality: CA Épinal

Government
  - Mayor (2020–2026): Jean-Luc Martinet
- Area^{1}: 3.85 km^{2} (1.49 sq mi)
- Elevation: 310 m (1,020 ft)
- Highest elevation: 389 m (1,276 ft)
- Lowest elevation: 259 m (850 ft)
- Population (2023): 282
  - Density: 73.2/km^{2} (190/sq mi)
- Time zone: UTC+01:00 (CET)
  - Summer (DST): UTC+02:00 (CEST)
- INSEE/Postal code: 88458 /88130
- ^{1} French Land Register data, which excludes lakes, ponds, glaciers > 1 km^{2} (0.386 sq mi or 247 acres) and river estuaries.

Socourt (French pronunciation: [sɔkuʁ]) is a commune in the Vosges department in Grand Est in northeastern France.

== See also ==
- Communes of the Vosges department
