= Avrainville, Vosges =

Avrainville
- Commune
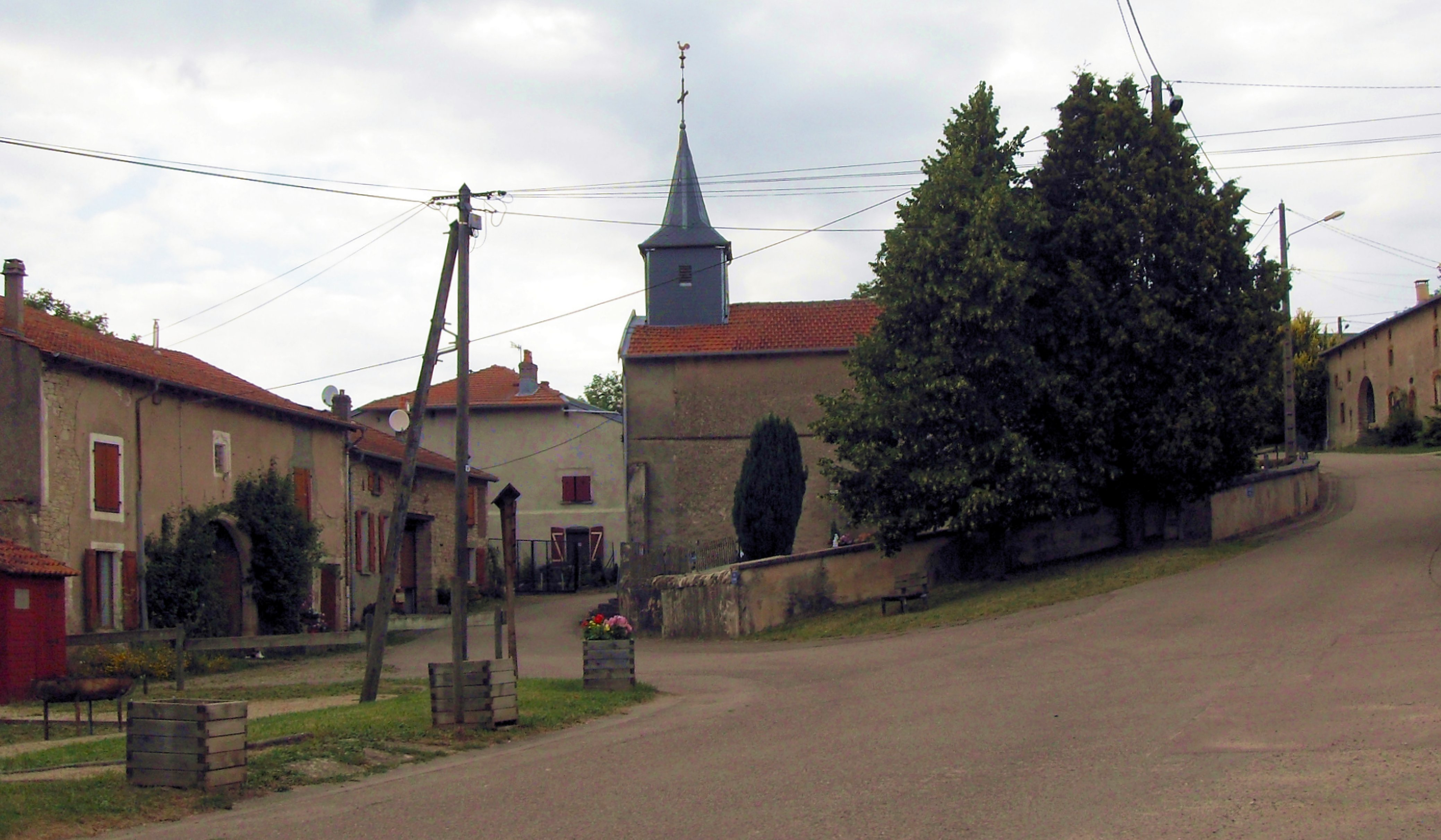
- The church in Avrainville

- Coat of arms
- Location of Avrainville
- Location within France Location within Grand Est
- Coordinates: 48°22′32″N 6°12′45″E
- Country: France
- Region: Grand Est
- Department: Vosges
- Arrondissement: Neufchâteau
- Canton: Charmes
- Intercommunality: CC Mirecourt Dompaire

Government
  - Mayor (2020–2026): Michel Forterre
- Area^{1}: 4.57 km^{2} (1.76 sq mi)
- Elevation: 269 m (883 ft)
- Highest elevation: 384 m (1,260 ft)
- Lowest elevation: 262 m (860 ft)
- Population (2023): 111
  - Density: 24.3/km^{2} (62.9/sq mi)
- Time zone: UTC+01:00 (CET)
  - Summer (DST): UTC+02:00 (CEST)
- INSEE/Postal code: 88024 /88130
- ^{1} French Land Register data, which excludes lakes, ponds, glaciers > 1 km^{2} (0.386 sq mi or 247 acres) and river estuaries.

Avrainville (French pronunciation: [avʁɛ̃vil]) is a commune in the Vosges department in Grand Est in northeastern France.

== See also ==
- Communes of the Vosges department
