= Rapey =

- Commune
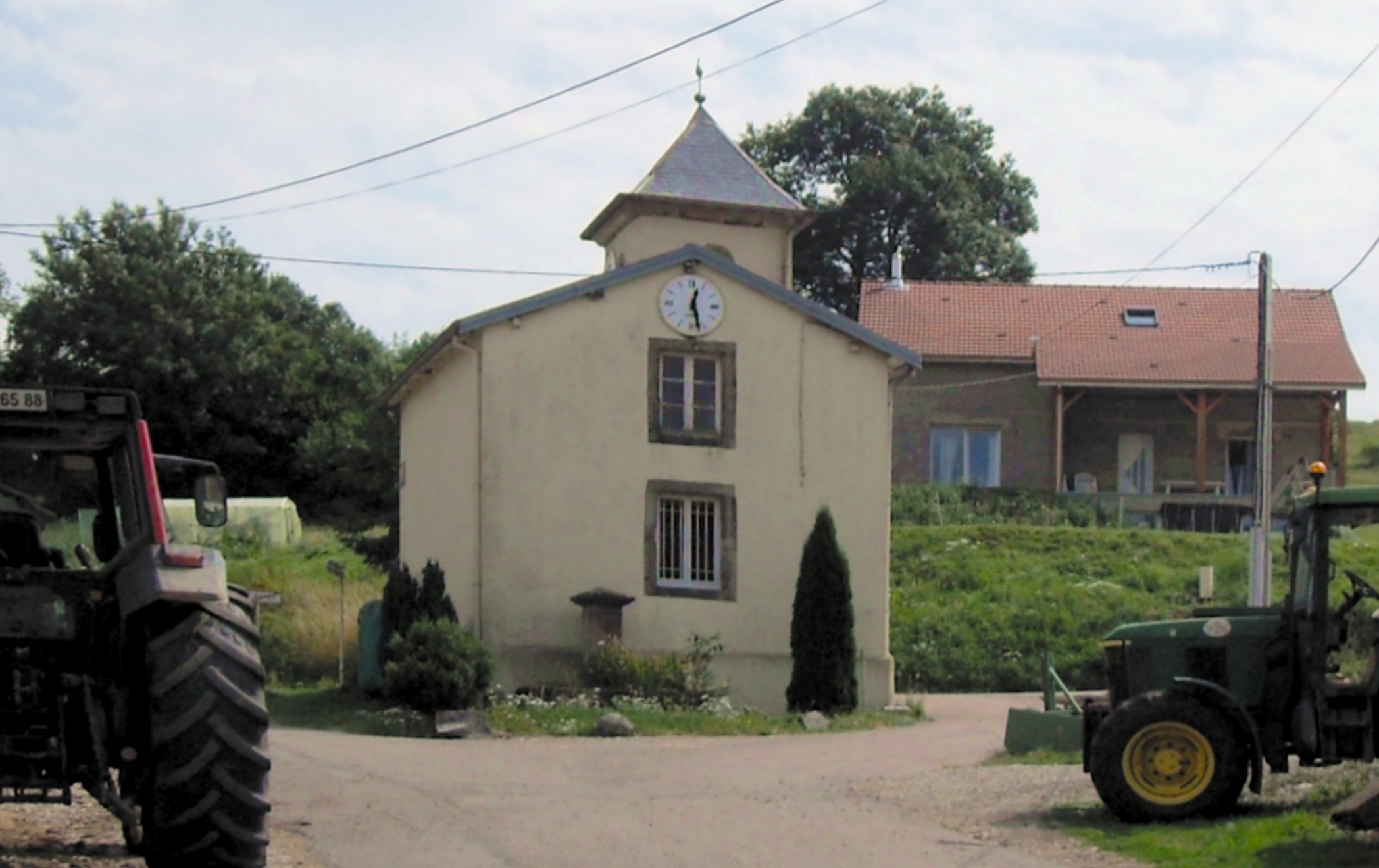
- The town hall in Rapey
- Location of Rapey
- Location within France Location within Grand Est
- Coordinates: 48°18′52″N 6°15′16″E
- Country: France
- Region: Grand Est
- Department: Vosges
- Arrondissement: Neufchâteau
- Canton: Charmes
- Intercommunality: CC Mirecourt Dompaire

Government
  - Mayor (2020–2026): Alain Barbe
- Area^{1}: 3.03 km^{2} (1.17 sq mi)
- Elevation: 365 m (1,198 ft)
- Highest elevation: 406 m (1,332 ft)
- Lowest elevation: 300 m (980 ft)
- Population (2023): 24
  - Density: 7.9/km^{2} (21/sq mi)
- Time zone: UTC+01:00 (CET)
  - Summer (DST): UTC+02:00 (CEST)
- INSEE/Postal code: 88374 /88130
- ^{1} French Land Register data, which excludes lakes, ponds, glaciers > 1 km^{2} (0.386 sq mi or 247 acres) and river estuaries.

Rapey (French pronunciation: [ʁapɛ]) is a commune in the Vosges department in Grand Est in northeastern France.

== See also ==
- Communes of the Vosges department
