= Bouxurulles =

- Commune
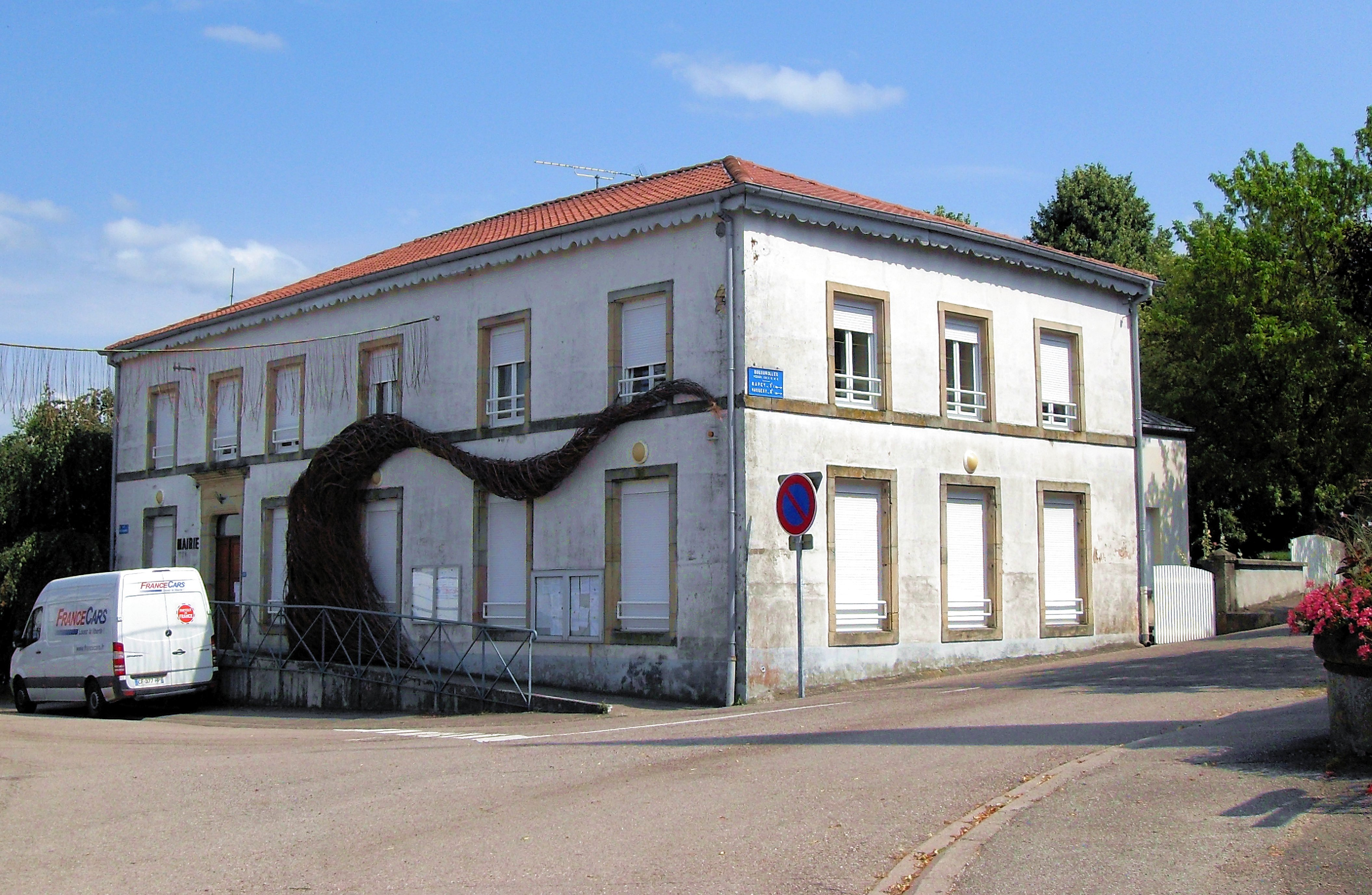
- The town hall in Bouxurulles

- Coat of arms
- Location of Bouxurulles
- Location within France Location within Grand Est
- Coordinates: 48°20′08″N 6°14′01″E
- Country: France
- Region: Grand Est
- Department: Vosges
- Arrondissement: Neufchâteau
- Canton: Charmes
- Intercommunality: CC Mirecourt Dompaire

Government
  - Mayor (2020–2026): Jean Vaubourg
- Area^{1}: 6.7 km^{2} (2.6 sq mi)
- Elevation: 350 m (1,150 ft)
- Highest elevation: 402 m (1,319 ft)
- Lowest elevation: 282 m (925 ft)
- Population (2023): 176
  - Density: 26/km^{2} (68/sq mi)
- Time zone: UTC+01:00 (CET)
  - Summer (DST): UTC+02:00 (CEST)
- INSEE/Postal code: 88070 /88130
- ^{1} French Land Register data, which excludes lakes, ponds, glaciers > 1 km^{2} (0.386 sq mi or 247 acres) and river estuaries.

Bouxurulles (French pronunciation: [buksyʁyl]) is a commune in the Vosges department in Grand Est in northeastern France.

== See also ==
- Communes of the Vosges department
