= Essegney =

- Commune
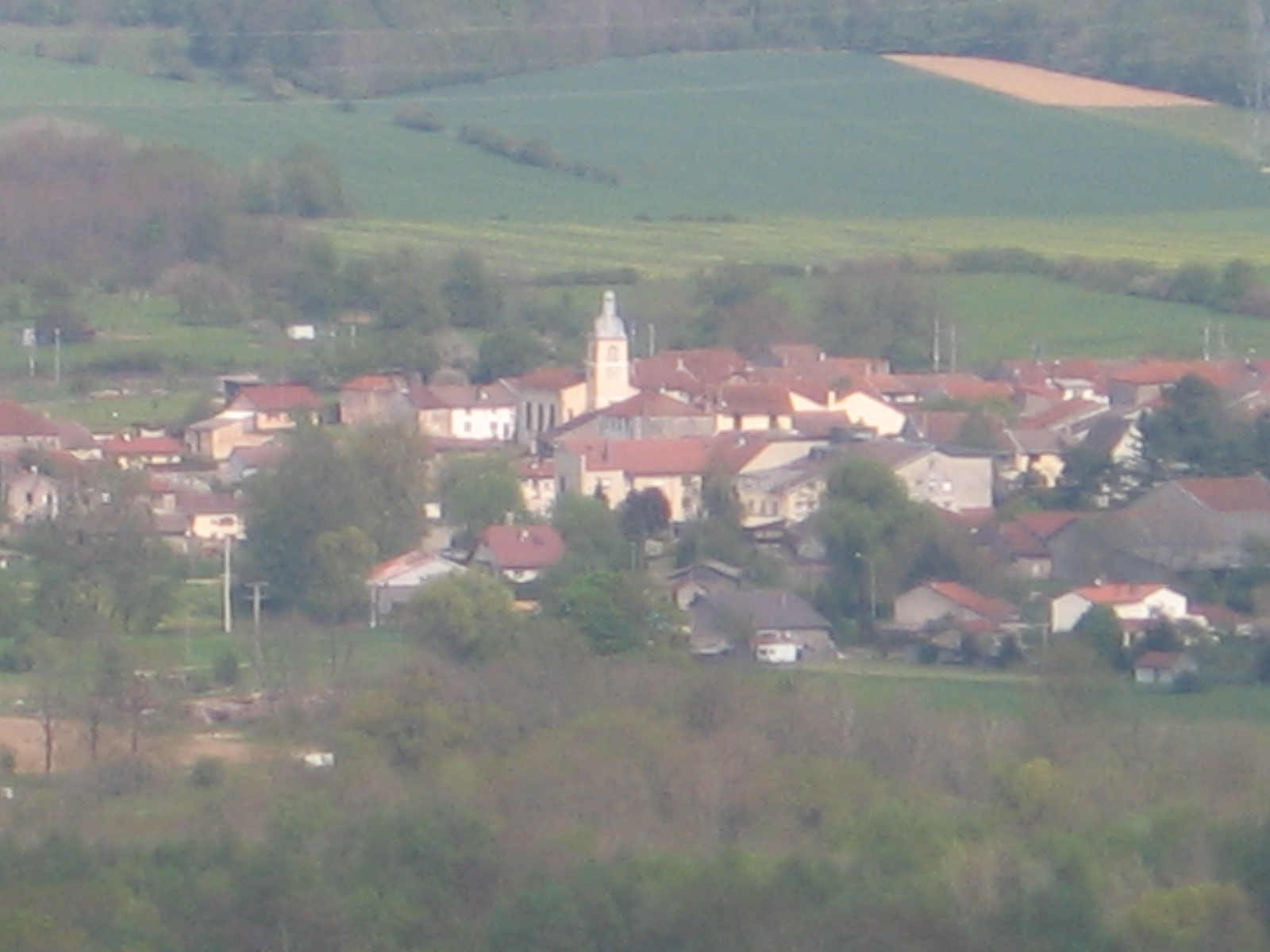
- A general view of Essegney

- Coat of arms
- Location of Essegney
- Location within France Location within Grand Est
- Coordinates: 48°22′06″N 6°19′03″E
- Country: France
- Region: Grand Est
- Department: Vosges
- Arrondissement: Épinal
- Canton: Charmes
- Intercommunality: CA Épinal

Government
  - Mayor (2020–2026): Éric Jacoté
- Area^{1}: 8.41 km^{2} (3.25 sq mi)
- Elevation: 300 m (980 ft)
- Highest elevation: 358 m (1,175 ft)
- Lowest elevation: 270 m (890 ft)
- Population (2023): 747
  - Density: 88.8/km^{2} (230/sq mi)
- Time zone: UTC+01:00 (CET)
  - Summer (DST): UTC+02:00 (CEST)
- INSEE/Postal code: 88163 /88130
- ^{1} French Land Register data, which excludes lakes, ponds, glaciers > 1 km^{2} (0.386 sq mi or 247 acres) and river estuaries.

Essegney (French pronunciation: [ɛsɲɛ]) is a commune in the Vosges department in Grand Est in northeastern France. It is part of the arrondissement of Épinal.

== Demographics ==
The population development of the village.

Historical population
Year	Pop.	±% p.a.
1968	566	—
1975	649	+1.97%
1982	739	+1.87%
1990	651	−1.57%
1999	622	−0.51%
2007	670	+0.93%
2012	735	+1.87%
2017	754	+0.51%
2023	747	−0.16%
Source: INSEE

== See also ==
- Communes of the Vosges department
