= Vomécourt-sur-Madon =

- Commune
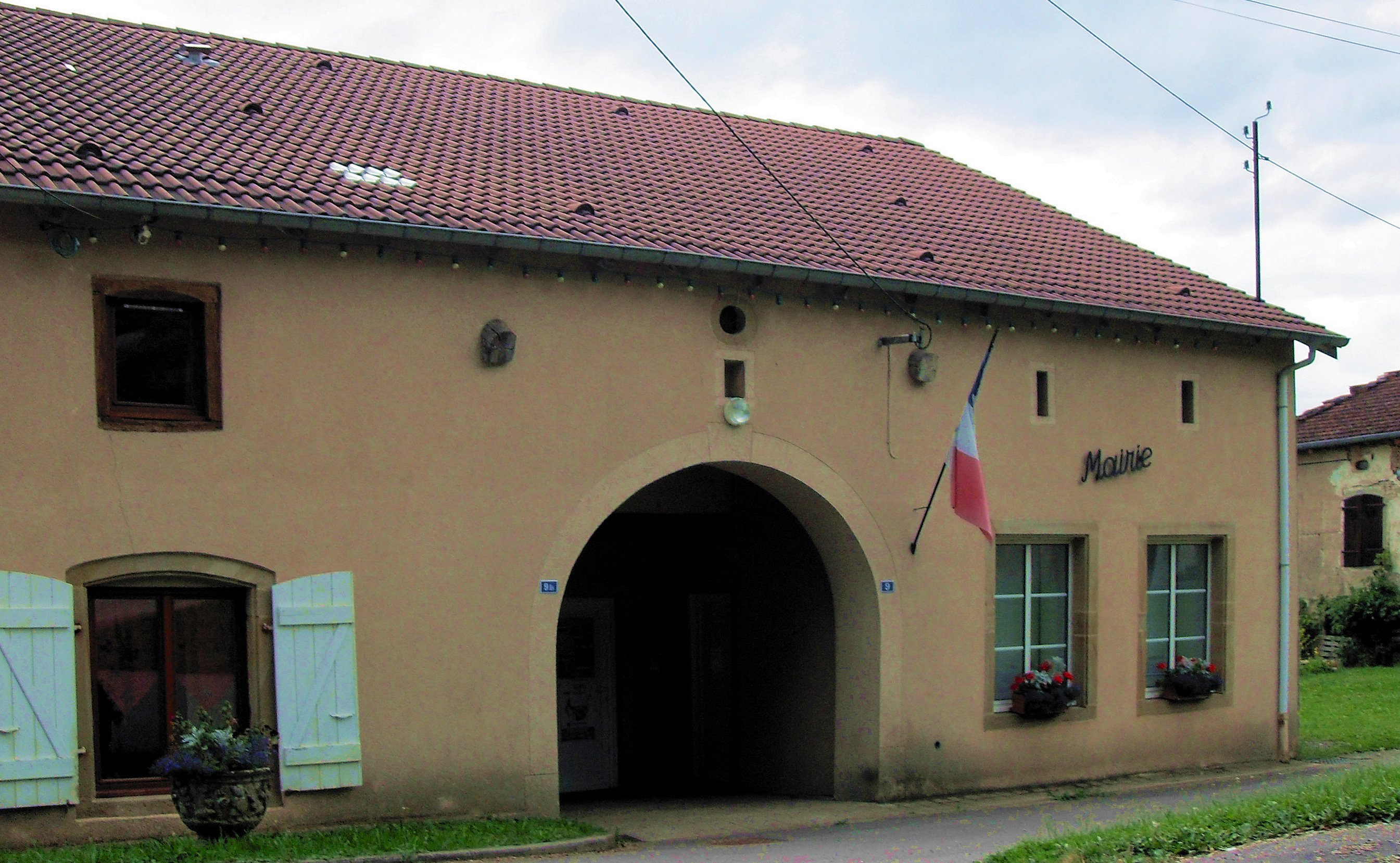
- The town hall in Vomécourt-sur-Madon

- Coat of arms
- Location of Vomécourt-sur-Madon
- Location within France Location within Grand Est
- Coordinates: 48°21′44″N 6°10′02″E
- Country: France
- Region: Grand Est
- Department: Vosges
- Arrondissement: Neufchâteau
- Canton: Charmes
- Intercommunality: Mirecourt Dompaire

Government
  - Mayor (2020–2026): Corinne Nicolas
- Area^{1}: 3.53 km^{2} (1.36 sq mi)
- Elevation: 284 m (932 ft)
- Highest elevation: 318 m (1,043 ft)
- Lowest elevation: 252 m (827 ft)
- Population (2023): 67
  - Density: 19/km^{2} (49/sq mi)
- Time zone: UTC+01:00 (CET)
  - Summer (DST): UTC+02:00 (CEST)
- INSEE/Postal code: 88522 /88500
- ^{1} French Land Register data, which excludes lakes, ponds, glaciers > 1 km^{2} (0.386 sq mi or 247 acres) and river estuaries.

Vomécourt-sur-Madon (French pronunciation: [vɔmekuʁ syʁ madɔ̃], literally Vomécourt on Madon) is a commune in the Vosges department in Grand Est in northeastern France.

== Geography ==
The river Madon flows through the commune.

== See also ==
- Communes of the Vosges department
