= Langley, Vosges =

Langley
- Commune
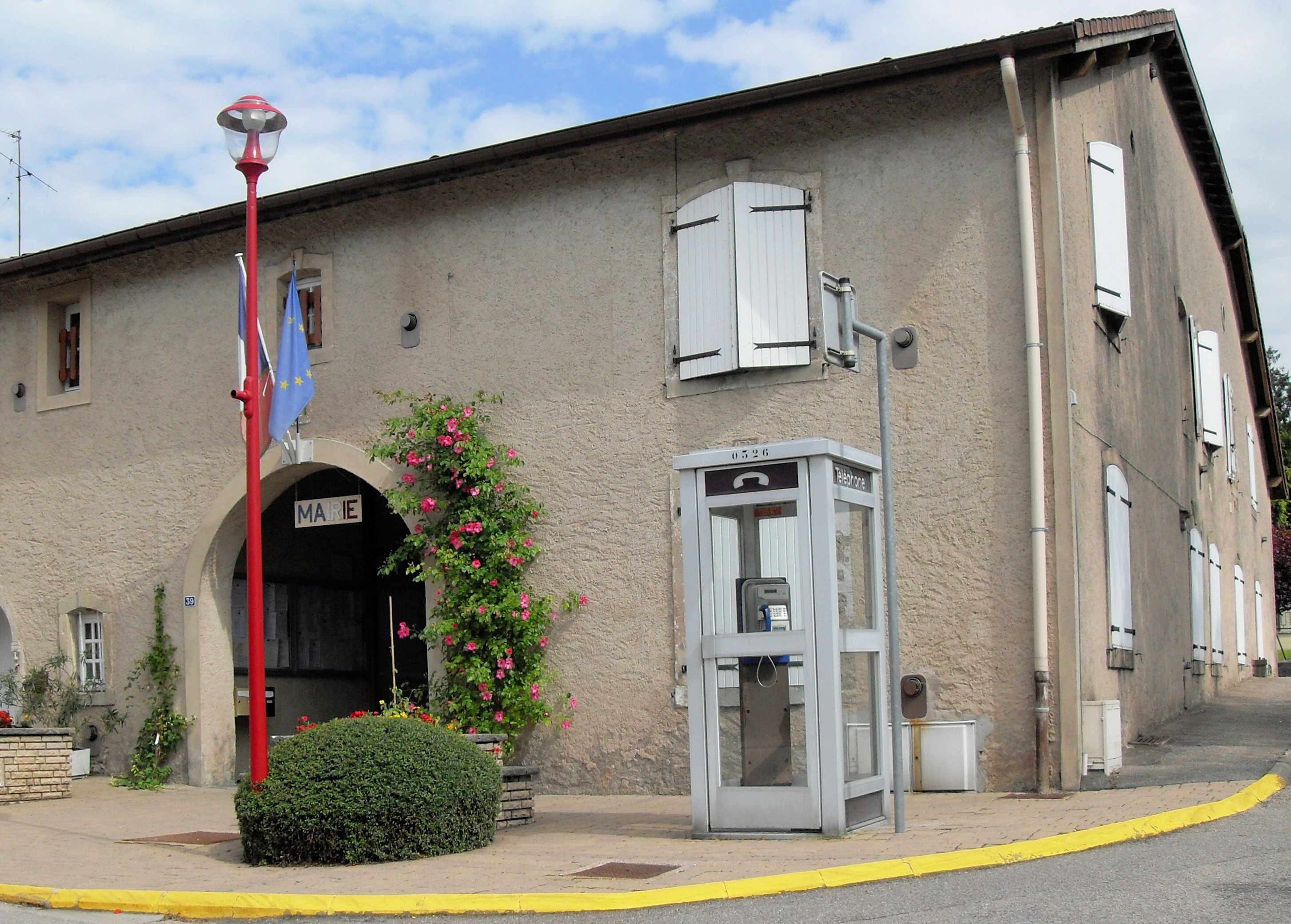
- The town hall in Langley

- Coat of arms
- Location of Langley
- Location within France Location within Grand Est
- Coordinates: 48°21′38″N 6°19′33″E
- Country: France
- Region: Grand Est
- Department: Vosges
- Arrondissement: Épinal
- Canton: Charmes
- Intercommunality: CA Épinal

Government
  - Mayor (2020–2026): Jean-Luc Chaudy
- Area^{1}: 2.73 km^{2} (1.05 sq mi)
- Elevation: 285 m (935 ft)
- Highest elevation: 336 m (1,102 ft)
- Lowest elevation: 271 m (889 ft)
- Population (2023): 140
  - Density: 51/km^{2} (130/sq mi)
- Time zone: UTC+01:00 (CET)
  - Summer (DST): UTC+02:00 (CEST)
- INSEE/Postal code: 88260 /88130
- ^{1} French Land Register data, which excludes lakes, ponds, glaciers > 1 km^{2} (0.386 sq mi or 247 acres) and river estuaries.

Langley (French pronunciation: [lɑ̃ɡlɛ]) is a commune in the Vosges department in Grand Est in northeastern France.

== See also ==
- Communes of the Vosges department
