= Varmonzey =

- Commune
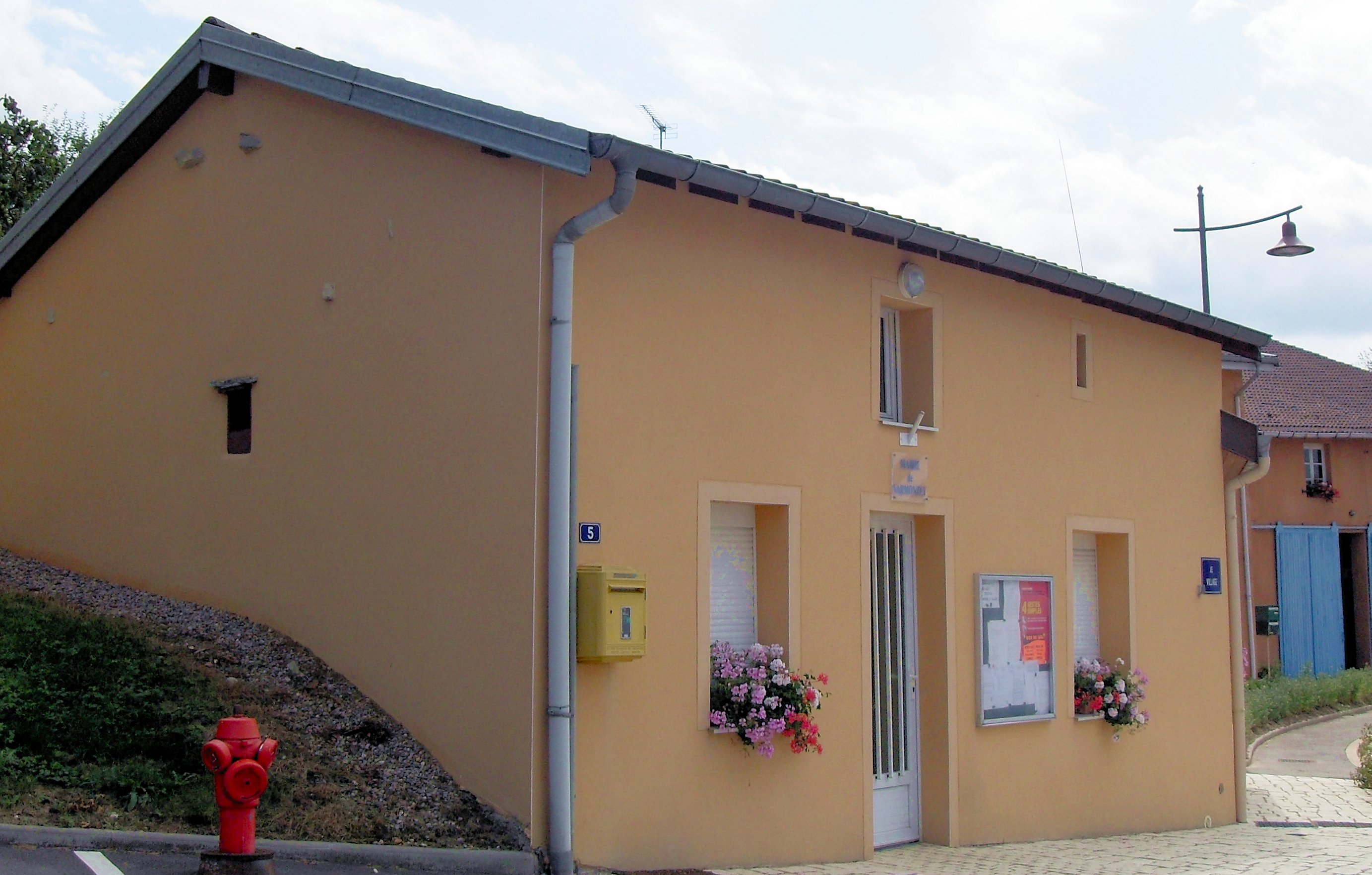
- The town hall in Varmonzey
- Location of Varmonzey
- Location within France Location within Grand Est
- Coordinates: 48°19′28″N 6°17′14″E
- Country: France
- Region: Grand Est
- Department: Vosges
- Arrondissement: Neufchâteau
- Canton: Charmes
- Intercommunality: CC Mirecourt Dompaire

Government
  - Mayor (2020–2026): Jean-Marie Mangin
- Area^{1}: 2.57 km^{2} (0.99 sq mi)
- Elevation: 310 m (1,020 ft)
- Highest elevation: 395 m (1,296 ft)
- Lowest elevation: 287 m (942 ft)
- Population (2023): 25
  - Density: 9.7/km^{2} (25/sq mi)
- Time zone: UTC+01:00 (CET)
  - Summer (DST): UTC+02:00 (CEST)
- INSEE/Postal code: 88493 /88450
- ^{1} French Land Register data, which excludes lakes, ponds, glaciers > 1 km^{2} (0.386 sq mi or 247 acres) and river estuaries.

Varmonzey (French pronunciation: [vaʁmɔ̃zɛ]) is a commune in the Vosges department in Grand Est in northeastern France.

== See also ==
- Communes of the Vosges department
