= Moriville =

- Commune
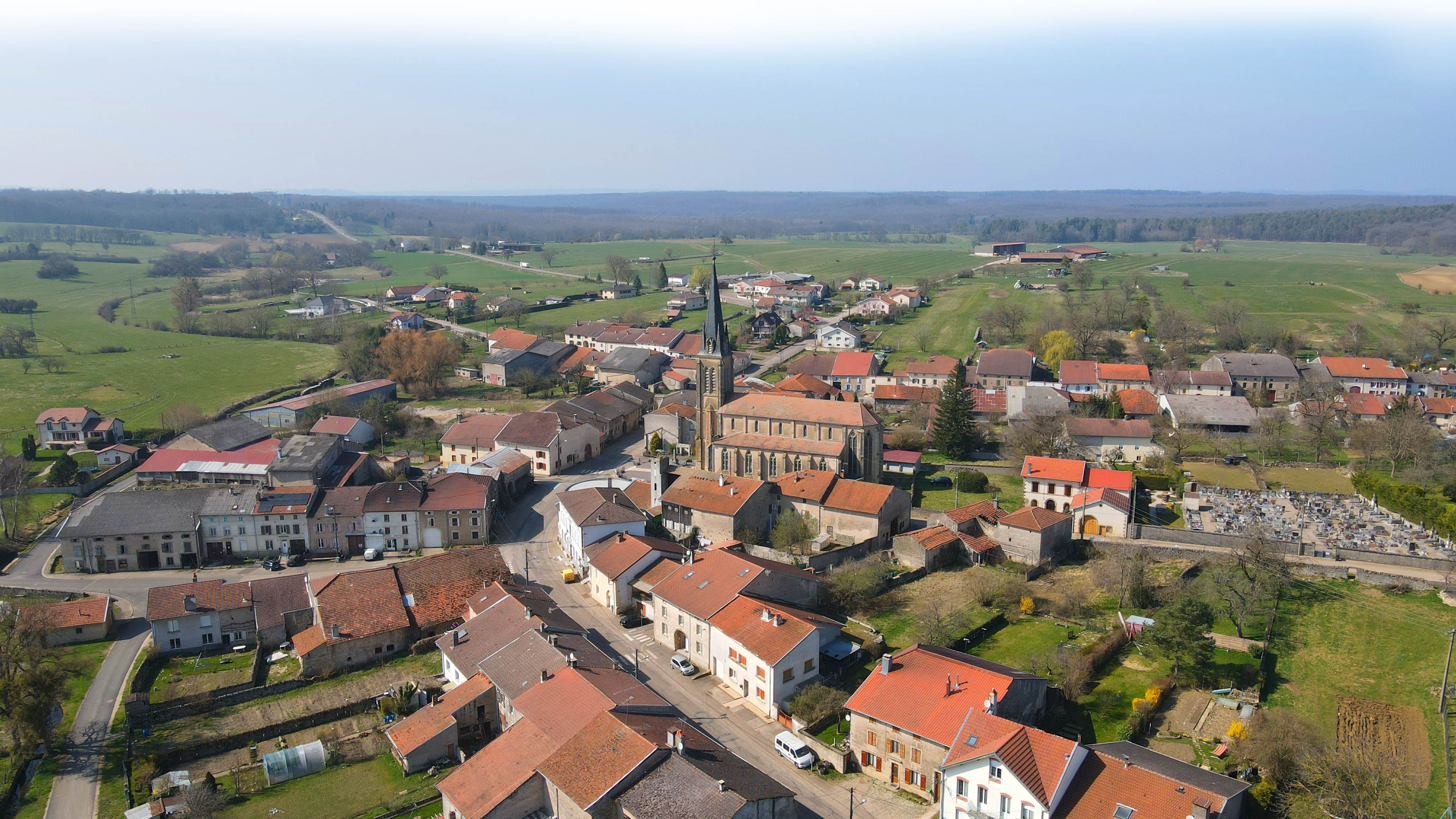
- Aerial view of Moriville
- Location of Moriville
- Location within France Location within Grand Est
- Coordinates: 48°20′57″N 6°25′56″E
- Country: France
- Region: Grand Est
- Department: Vosges
- Arrondissement: Épinal
- Canton: Charmes
- Intercommunality: CA Épinal

Government
  - Mayor (2020–2026): Alain Gamet
- Area^{1}: 25.05 km^{2} (9.67 sq mi)
- Elevation: 348 m (1,142 ft)
- Highest elevation: 383 m (1,257 ft)
- Lowest elevation: 300 m (980 ft)
- Population (2023): 443
  - Density: 17.7/km^{2} (45.8/sq mi)
- Time zone: UTC+01:00 (CET)
  - Summer (DST): UTC+02:00 (CEST)
- INSEE/Postal code: 88313 /88330
- ^{1} French Land Register data, which excludes lakes, ponds, glaciers > 1 km^{2} (0.386 sq mi or 247 acres) and river estuaries.

Moriville (French pronunciation: [mɔʁivil]) is a commune in the Vosges department in Grand Est in northeastern France.

Inhabitants are called Morivillois.

== See also ==
- Communes of the Vosges department
