= Gircourt-lès-Viéville =

- Commune
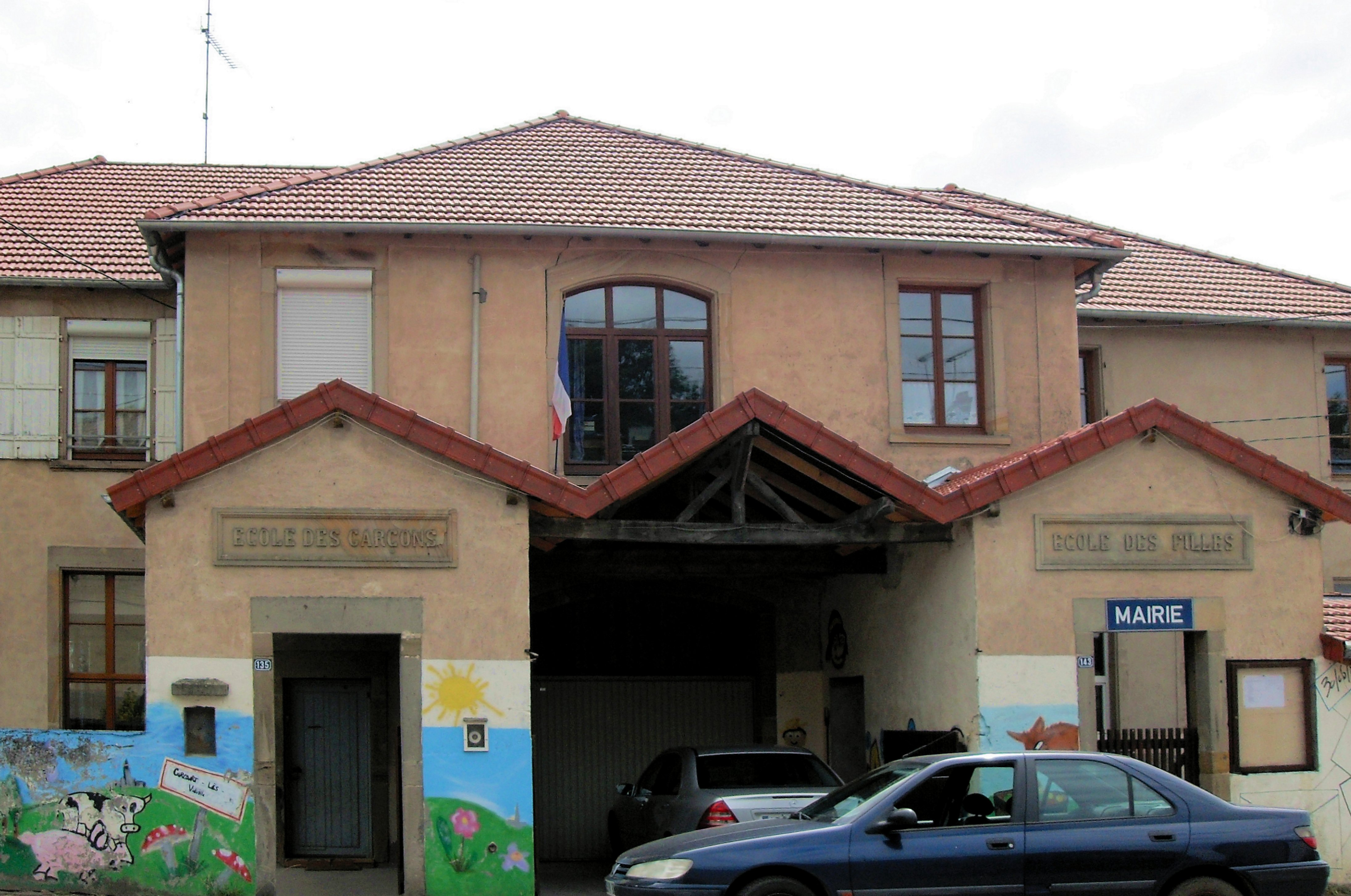
- The town hall and school in Gircourt-lès-Viéville

- Coat of arms
- Location of Gircourt-lès-Viéville
- Location within France Location within Grand Est
- Coordinates: 48°20′29″N 6°11′42″E
- Country: France
- Region: Grand Est
- Department: Vosges
- Arrondissement: Neufchâteau
- Canton: Charmes
- Intercommunality: CC Mirecourt Dompaire

Government
  - Mayor (2020–2026): Arnaud Jeandel
- Area^{1}: 8.44 km^{2} (3.26 sq mi)
- Elevation: 335 m (1,099 ft)
- Highest elevation: 376 m (1,234 ft)
- Lowest elevation: 259 m (850 ft)
- Population (2023): 183
  - Density: 21.7/km^{2} (56.2/sq mi)
- Time zone: UTC+01:00 (CET)
  - Summer (DST): UTC+02:00 (CEST)
- INSEE/Postal code: 88202 /88500
- ^{1} French Land Register data, which excludes lakes, ponds, glaciers > 1 km^{2} (0.386 sq mi or 247 acres) and river estuaries.

Gircourt-lès-Viéville (French pronunciation: [ʒiʁkuʁ lɛ vjevil]) is a commune in the Vosges department in Grand Est in northeastern France.

== See also ==
- Communes of the Vosges department
