= Avillers, Vosges =

Avillers
- Commune
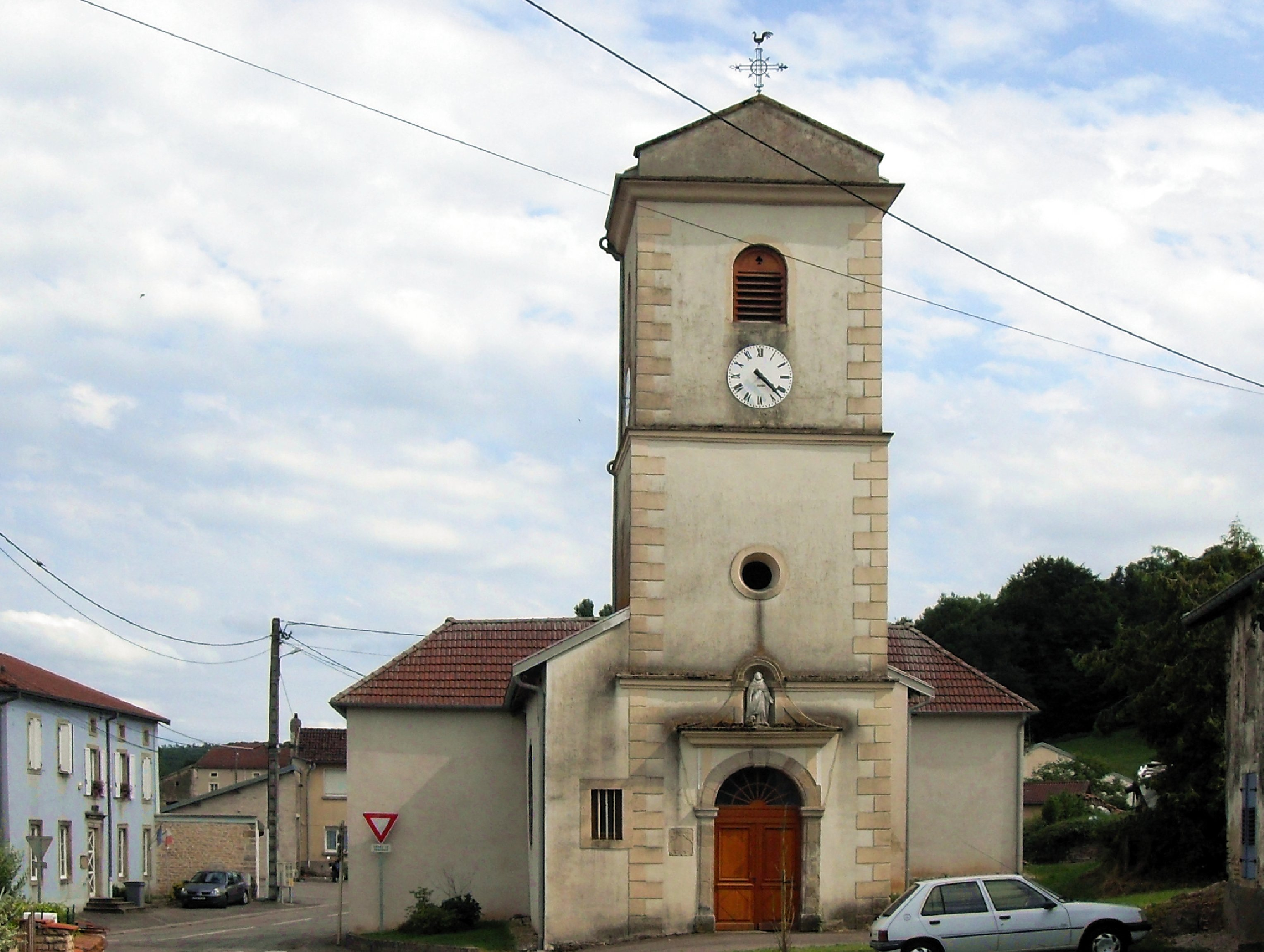
- The church in Avillers

- Coat of arms
- Location of Avillers
- Location within France Location within Grand Est
- Coordinates: 48°18′45″N 6°12′34″E
- Country: France
- Region: Grand Est
- Department: Vosges
- Arrondissement: Neufchâteau
- Canton: Charmes
- Intercommunality: CC Mirecourt Dompaire

Government
  - Mayor (2020–2026): Denis Bastien
- Area^{1}: 6.92 km^{2} (2.67 sq mi)
- Elevation: 290 m (950 ft)
- Highest elevation: 395 m (1,296 ft)
- Lowest elevation: 272 m (892 ft)
- Population (2023): 88
  - Density: 13/km^{2} (33/sq mi)
- Time zone: UTC+01:00 (CET)
  - Summer (DST): UTC+02:00 (CEST)
- INSEE/Postal code: 88023 /88500
- ^{1} French Land Register data, which excludes lakes, ponds, glaciers > 1 km^{2} (0.386 sq mi or 247 acres) and river estuaries.

Avillers is a commune in the Vosges department in Grand Est in northeastern France.

== See also ==
- Communes of the Vosges department
