= Florémont =

- Commune
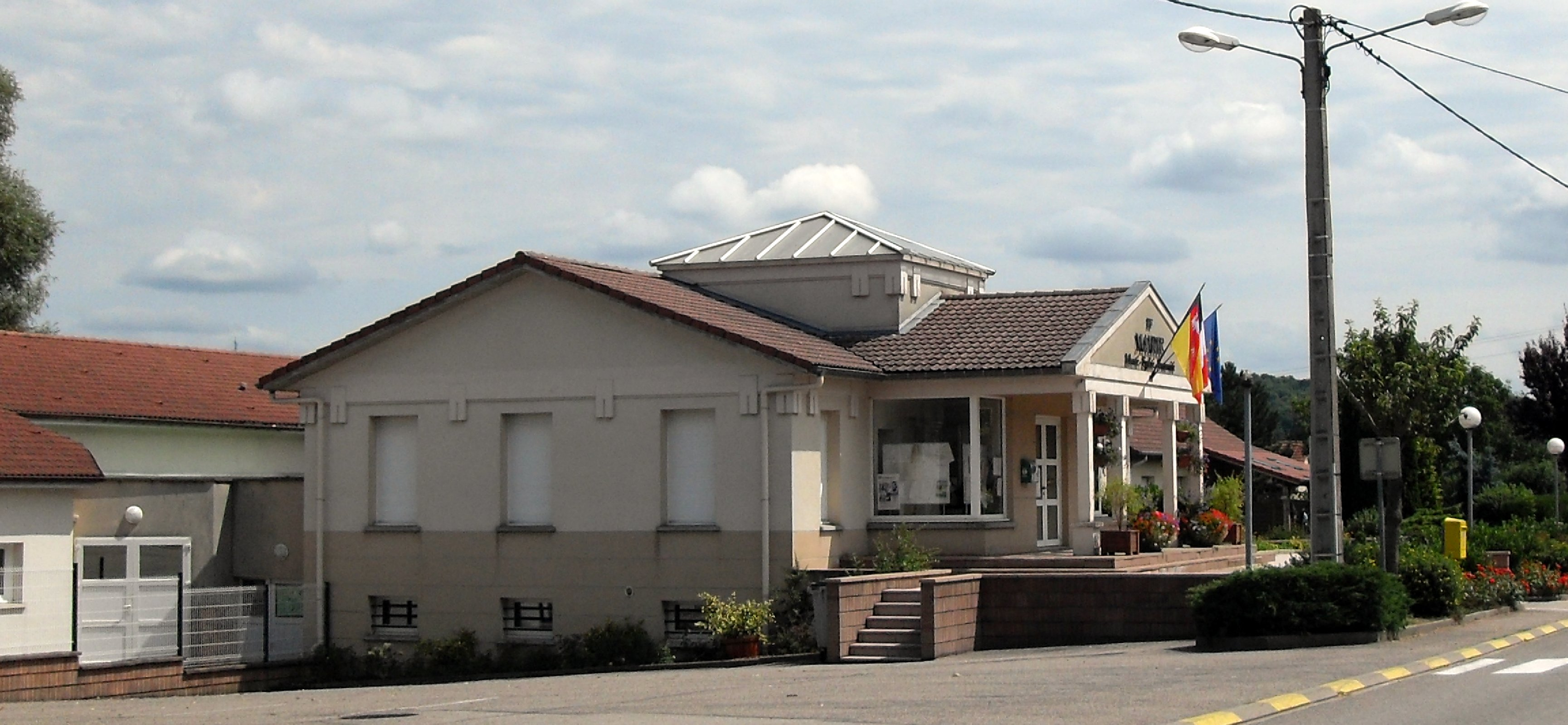
- The town hall and school in Florémont

- Coat of arms
- Location of Florémont
- Location within France Location within Grand Est
- Coordinates: 48°22′02″N 6°15′20″E
- Country: France
- Region: Grand Est
- Department: Vosges
- Arrondissement: Épinal
- Canton: Charmes
- Intercommunality: CA Épinal

Government
  - Mayor (2020–2026): Jean-Noël Lombard
- Area^{1}: 8.09 km^{2} (3.12 sq mi)
- Elevation: 278 m (912 ft)
- Highest elevation: 377 m (1,237 ft)
- Lowest elevation: 262 m (860 ft)
- Population (2023): 467
  - Density: 57.7/km^{2} (150/sq mi)
- Time zone: UTC+01:00 (CET)
  - Summer (DST): UTC+02:00 (CEST)
- INSEE/Postal code: 88173 /88130
- ^{1} French Land Register data, which excludes lakes, ponds, glaciers > 1 km^{2} (0.386 sq mi or 247 acres) and river estuaries.

Florémont (French pronunciation: [flɔʁemɔ̃]) is a commune in the Vosges department in Grand Est in northeastern France.

== See also ==
- Communes of the Vosges department
