= Battexey =

- Commune
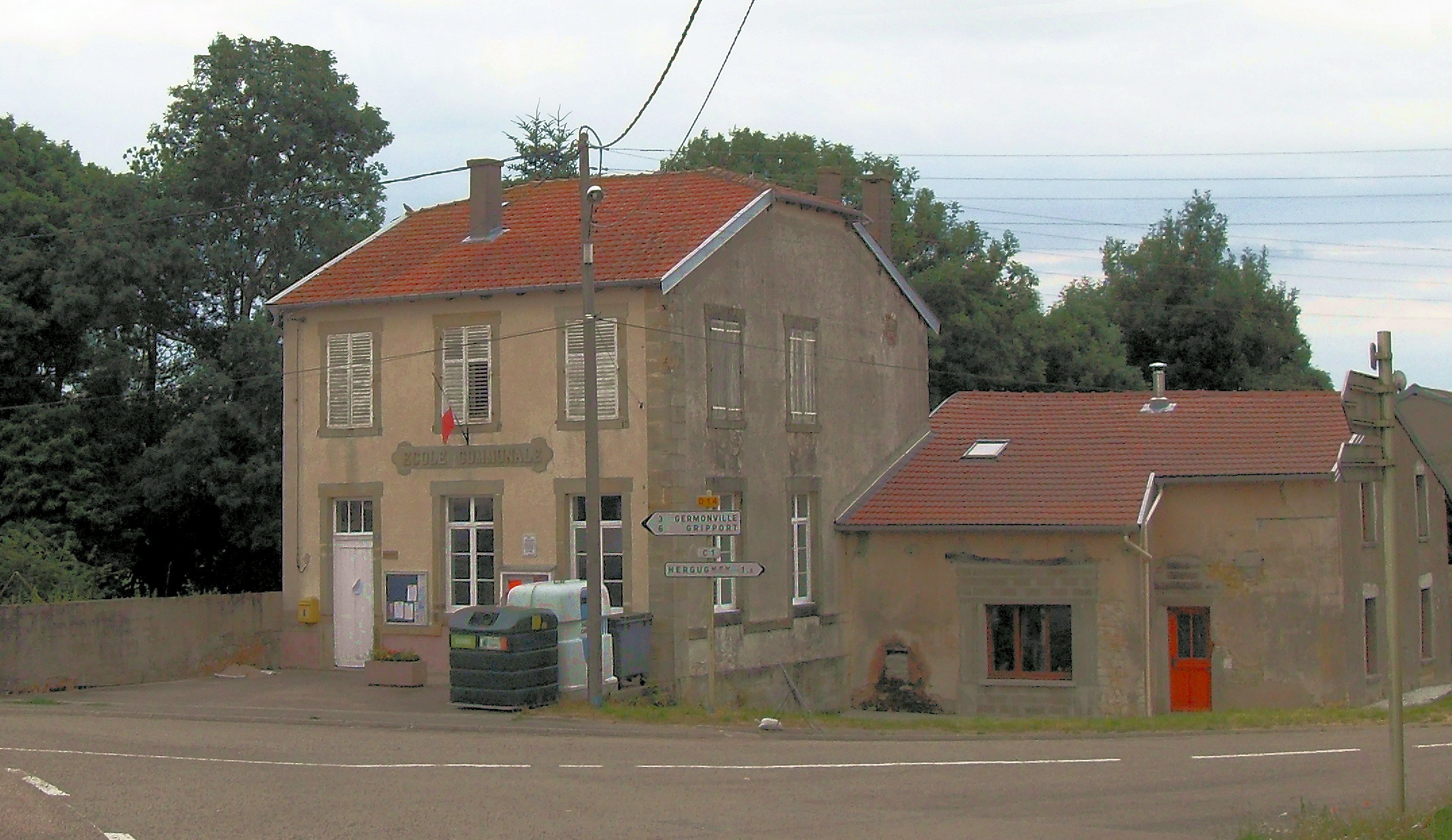
- The town hall and school in Battexey

- Coat of arms
- Location of Battexey
- Location within France Location within Grand Est
- Coordinates: 48°23′26″N 6°10′53″E
- Country: France
- Region: Grand Est
- Department: Vosges
- Arrondissement: Neufchâteau
- Canton: Charmes
- Intercommunality: CC Mirecourt Dompaire

Government
  - Mayor (2020–2026): Claude Tallotte
- Area^{1}: 2.72 km^{2} (1.05 sq mi)
- Elevation: 280 m (920 ft)
- Highest elevation: 328 m (1,076 ft)
- Lowest elevation: 249 m (817 ft)
- Population (2023): 31
  - Density: 11/km^{2} (30/sq mi)
- Time zone: UTC+01:00 (CET)
  - Summer (DST): UTC+02:00 (CEST)
- INSEE/Postal code: 88038 /88130
- ^{1} French Land Register data, which excludes lakes, ponds, glaciers > 1 km^{2} (0.386 sq mi or 247 acres) and river estuaries.

Battexey (French pronunciation: [batɛksɛ]) is a commune in the Vosges department in Grand Est in northeastern France.

== Geography ==
The river Madon flows through the commune.

== See also ==
- Communes of the Vosges department
