= Rugney =

- Commune
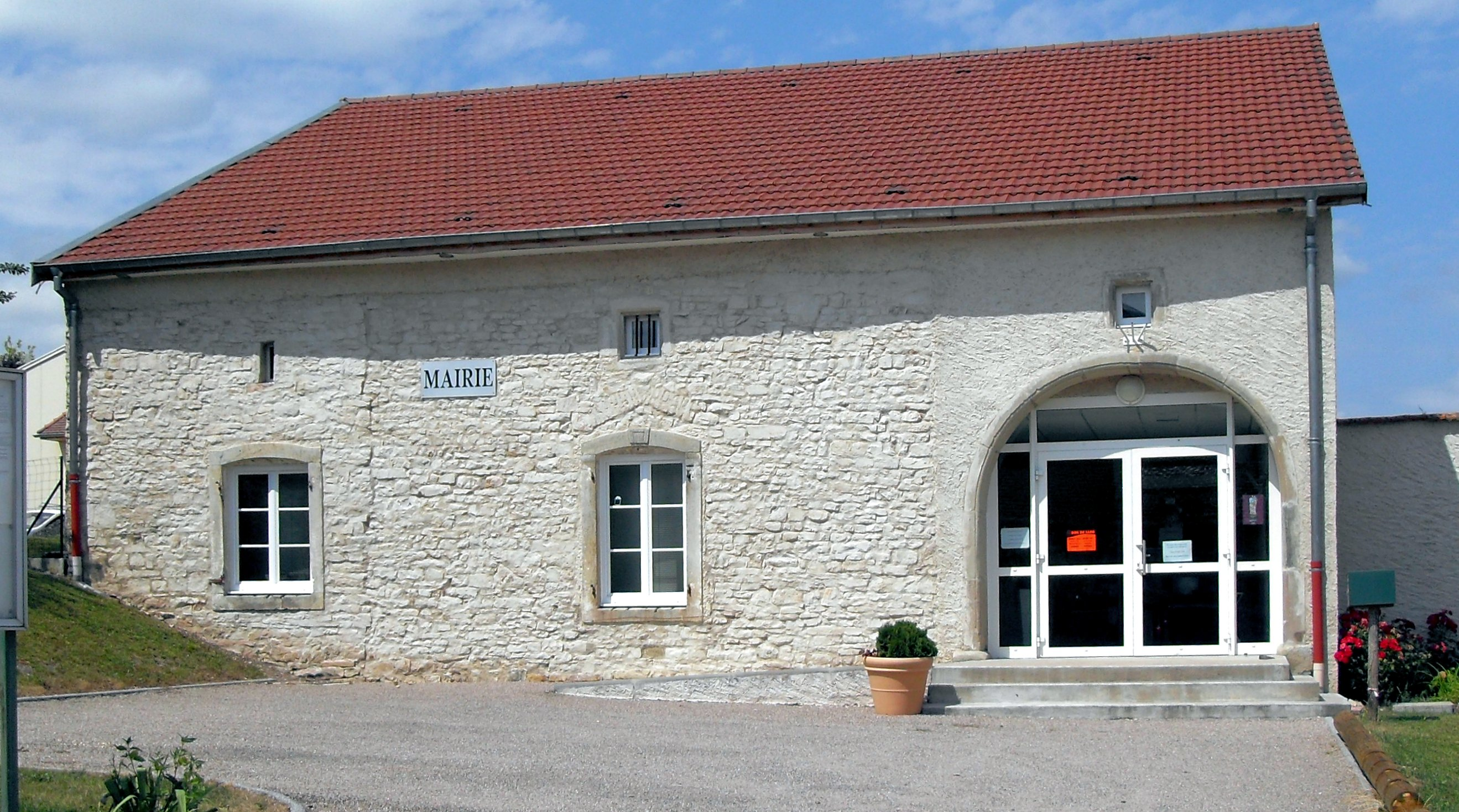
- The town hall in Rugney

- Coat of arms
- Location of Rugney
- Location within France Location within Grand Est
- Coordinates: 48°20′52″N 6°15′20″E
- Country: France
- Region: Grand Est
- Department: Vosges
- Arrondissement: Épinal
- Canton: Charmes
- Intercommunality: CA Épinal

Government
  - Mayor (2020–2026): Franck Garcia
- Area^{1}: 5.73 km^{2} (2.21 sq mi)
- Elevation: 298 m (978 ft)
- Highest elevation: 411 m (1,348 ft)
- Lowest elevation: 272 m (892 ft)
- Population (2023): 130
  - Density: 23/km^{2} (59/sq mi)
- Time zone: UTC+01:00 (CET)
  - Summer (DST): UTC+02:00 (CEST)
- INSEE/Postal code: 88406 /88130
- ^{1} French Land Register data, which excludes lakes, ponds, glaciers > 1 km^{2} (0.386 sq mi or 247 acres) and river estuaries.

Rugney (French pronunciation: [ʁyɲɛ]) is a commune in the Vosges department in Grand Est in northeastern France.

== See also ==
- Communes of the Vosges department
