= Hadigny-les-Verrières =

- Commune
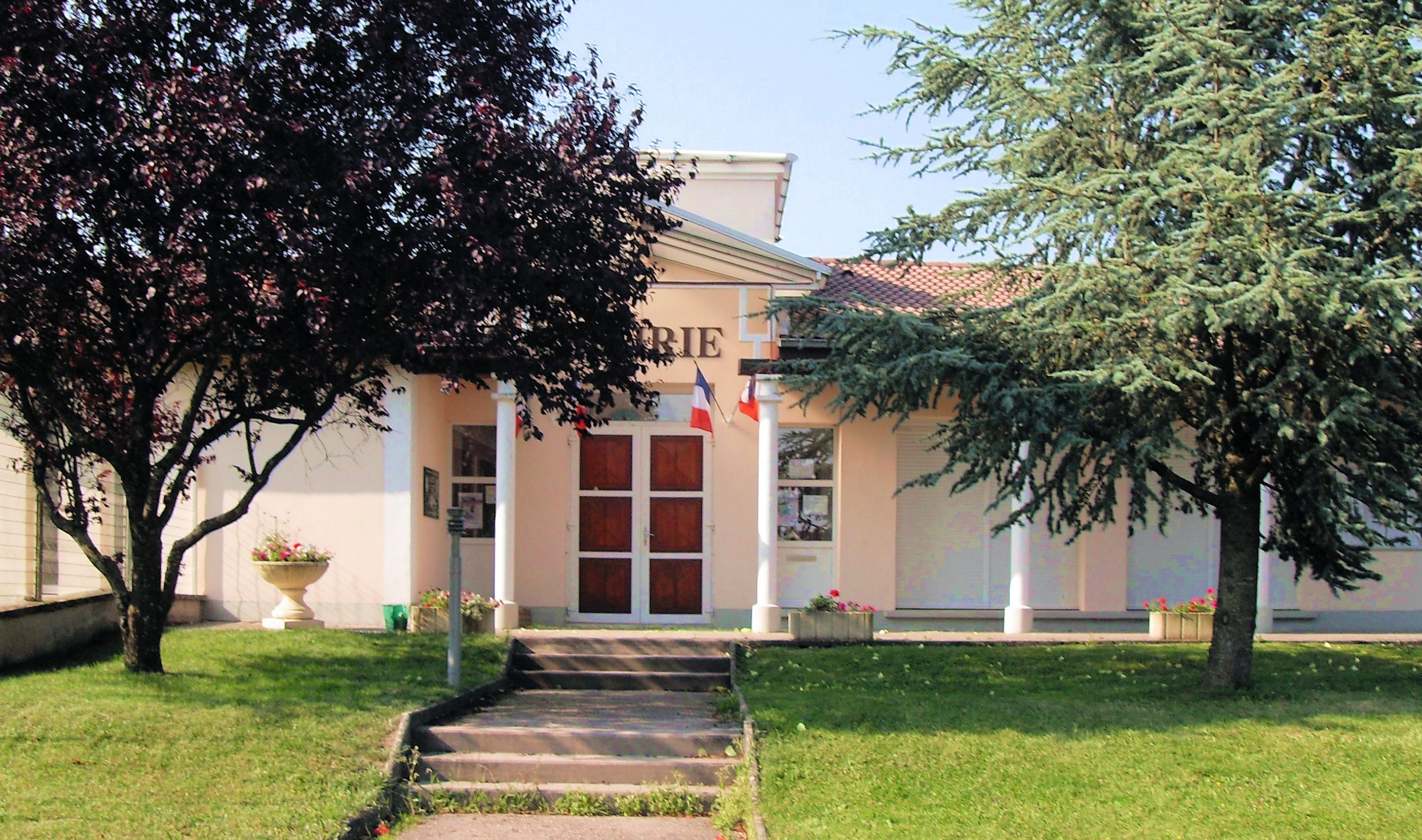
- The town hall in Hadigny-les-Verrières

- Coat of arms
- Location of Hadigny-les-Verrières
- Location within France Location within Grand Est
- Coordinates: 48°19′23″N 6°27′43″E
- Country: France
- Region: Grand Est
- Department: Vosges
- Arrondissement: Épinal
- Canton: Charmes
- Intercommunality: Épinal

Government
  - Mayor (2020–2026): Thierry Soler
- Area^{1}: 13.74 km^{2} (5.31 sq mi)
- Elevation: 325 m (1,066 ft)
- Highest elevation: 391 m (1,283 ft)
- Lowest elevation: 314 m (1,030 ft)
- Population (2023): 374
  - Density: 27.2/km^{2} (70.5/sq mi)
- Time zone: UTC+01:00 (CET)
  - Summer (DST): UTC+02:00 (CEST)
- INSEE/Postal code: 88224 /88330
- ^{1} French Land Register data, which excludes lakes, ponds, glaciers > 1 km^{2} (0.386 sq mi or 247 acres) and river estuaries.

Hadigny-les-Verrières (French pronunciation: [adiɲi le vɛʁjɛʁ]) is a commune in the Vosges department in Grand Est in northeastern France.

== Population ==
Historical population
Year	Pop.	±% p.a.
1968	253	—
1975	209	−2.69%
1982	345	+7.42%
1990	351	+0.22%
1999	350	−0.03%
2007	419	+2.27%
2012	370	−2.46%
2017	405	+1.82%
2023	374	−1.32%
Source: INSEE

== See also ==
- Communes of the Vosges department
