= Savigny, Vosges =

Savigny
- Commune
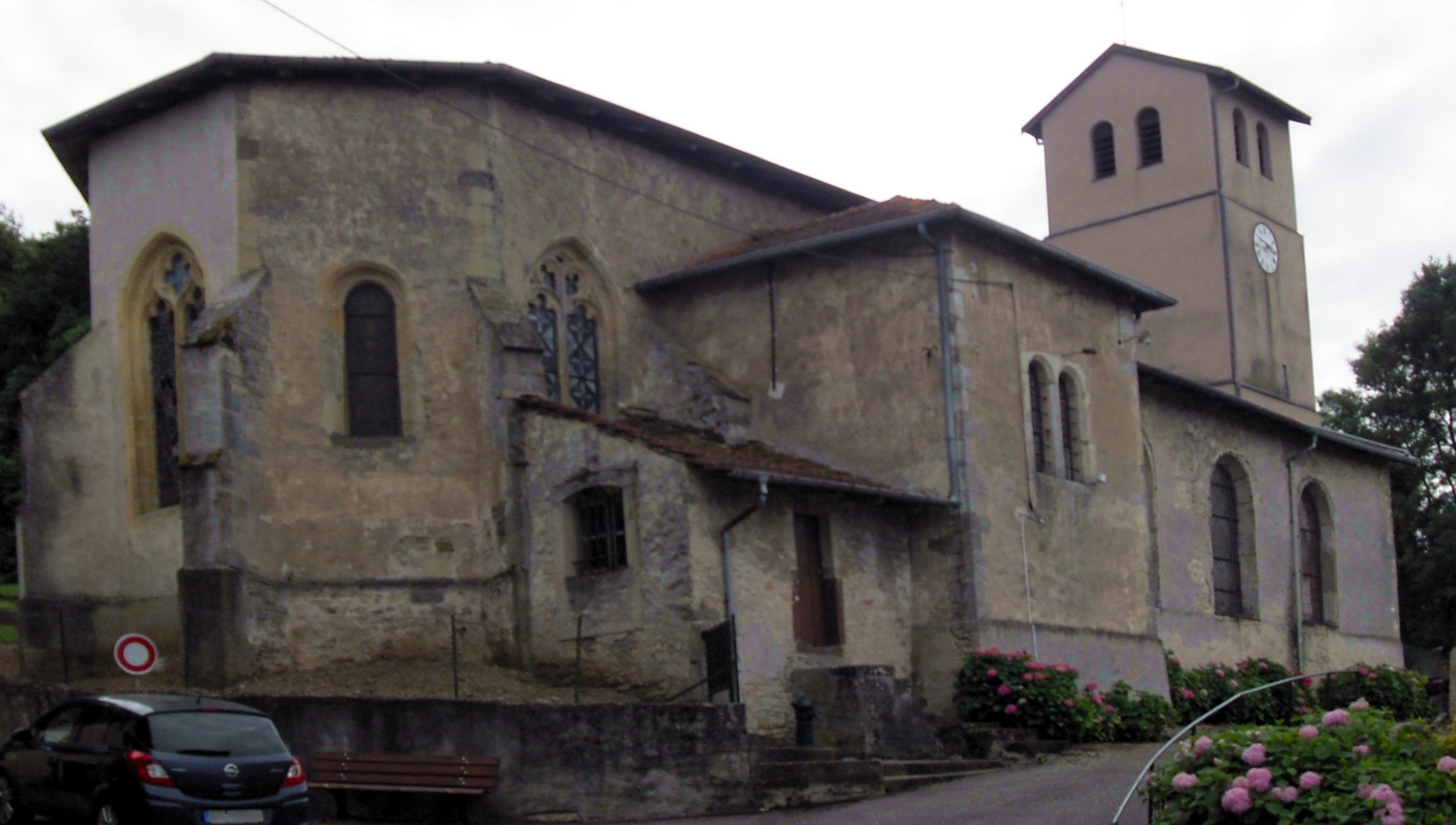
- The church in Savigny

- Coat of arms
- Location of Savigny
- Location within France Location within Grand Est
- Coordinates: 48°21′17″N 6°13′12″E
- Country: France
- Region: Grand Est
- Department: Vosges
- Arrondissement: Épinal
- Canton: Charmes
- Intercommunality: CA Épinal

Government
  - Mayor (2020–2026): Chantal Deschaseaux
- Area^{1}: 6.17 km^{2} (2.38 sq mi)
- Elevation: 302 m (991 ft)
- Highest elevation: 384 m (1,260 ft)
- Lowest elevation: 267 m (876 ft)
- Population (2023): 211
  - Density: 34.2/km^{2} (88.6/sq mi)
- Time zone: UTC+01:00 (CET)
  - Summer (DST): UTC+02:00 (CEST)
- INSEE/Postal code: 88449 /88130
- ^{1} French Land Register data, which excludes lakes, ponds, glaciers > 1 km^{2} (0.386 sq mi or 247 acres) and river estuaries.

Savigny (French pronunciation: [saviɲi]) is a commune in the Vosges department in Grand Est in northeastern France.

== See also ==
- Communes of the Vosges department
