= Ubexy =

- Commune
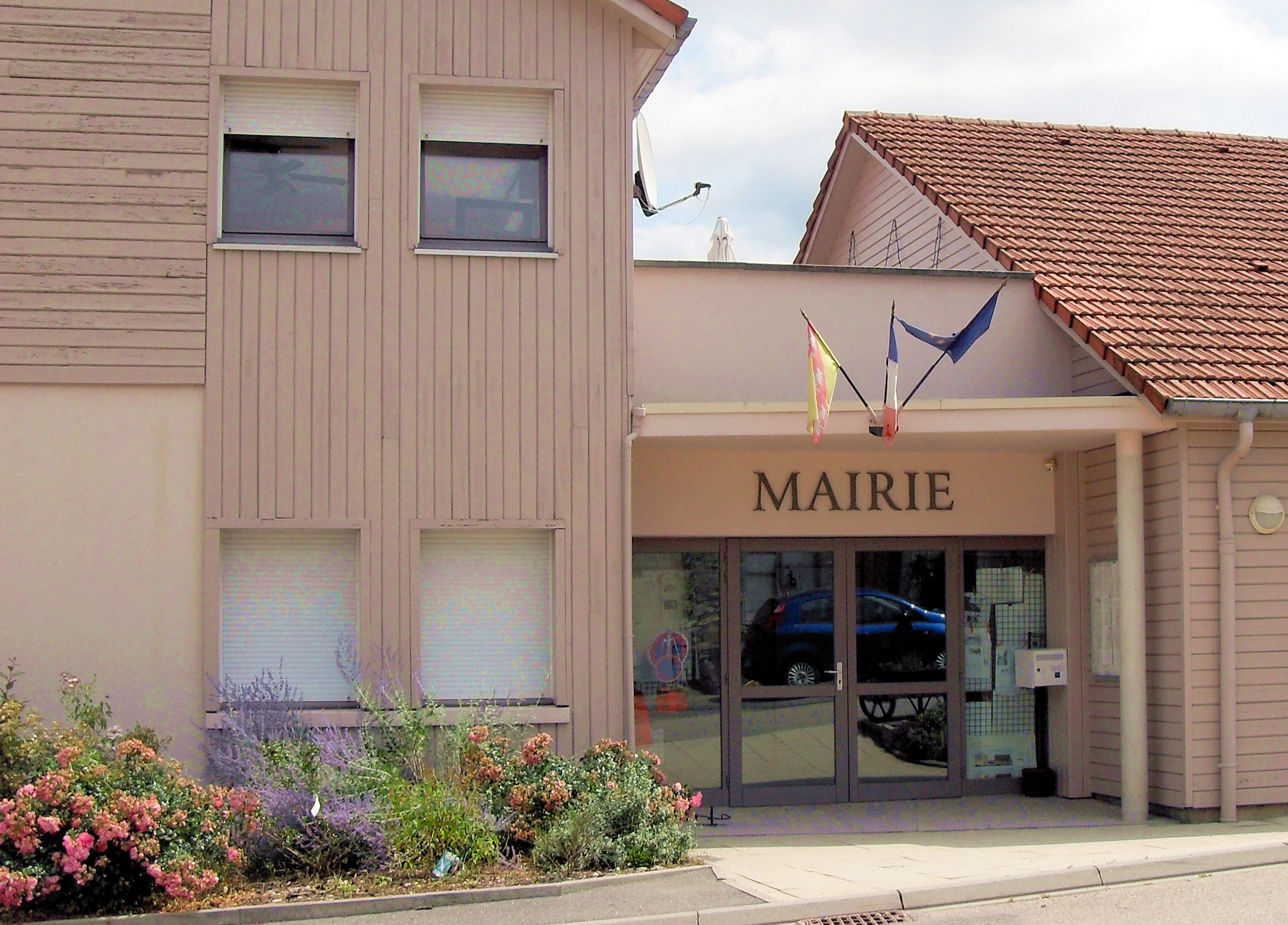
- The town hall in Ubexy

- Coat of arms
- Location of Ubexy
- Location within France Location within Grand Est
- Coordinates: 48°20′09″N 6°16′25″E
- Country: France
- Region: Grand Est
- Department: Vosges
- Arrondissement: Épinal
- Canton: Charmes
- Intercommunality: Épinal

Government
  - Mayor (2020–2026): Gérard Colin
- Area^{1}: 5.01 km^{2} (1.93 sq mi)
- Elevation: 290 m (950 ft)
- Highest elevation: 410 m (1,350 ft)
- Lowest elevation: 272 m (892 ft)
- Population (2023): 170
  - Density: 34/km^{2} (88/sq mi)
- Time zone: UTC+01:00 (CET)
  - Summer (DST): UTC+02:00 (CEST)
- INSEE/Postal code: 88480 /88130
- ^{1} French Land Register data, which excludes lakes, ponds, glaciers > 1 km^{2} (0.386 sq mi or 247 acres) and river estuaries.

Ubexy (French pronunciation: [ypsi]) is a commune in the Vosges department in Grand Est in northeastern France.

== Population ==
Historical population
Year	Pop.	±% p.a.
1968	200	—
1975	174	−1.97%
1982	207	+2.51%
1990	212	+0.30%
1999	199	−0.70%
2007	171	−1.88%
2012	170	−0.12%
2017	175	+0.58%
2023	170	−0.48%
Source: INSEE

== See also ==
- Communes of the Vosges department
