= Pont-sur-Madon =

- Commune
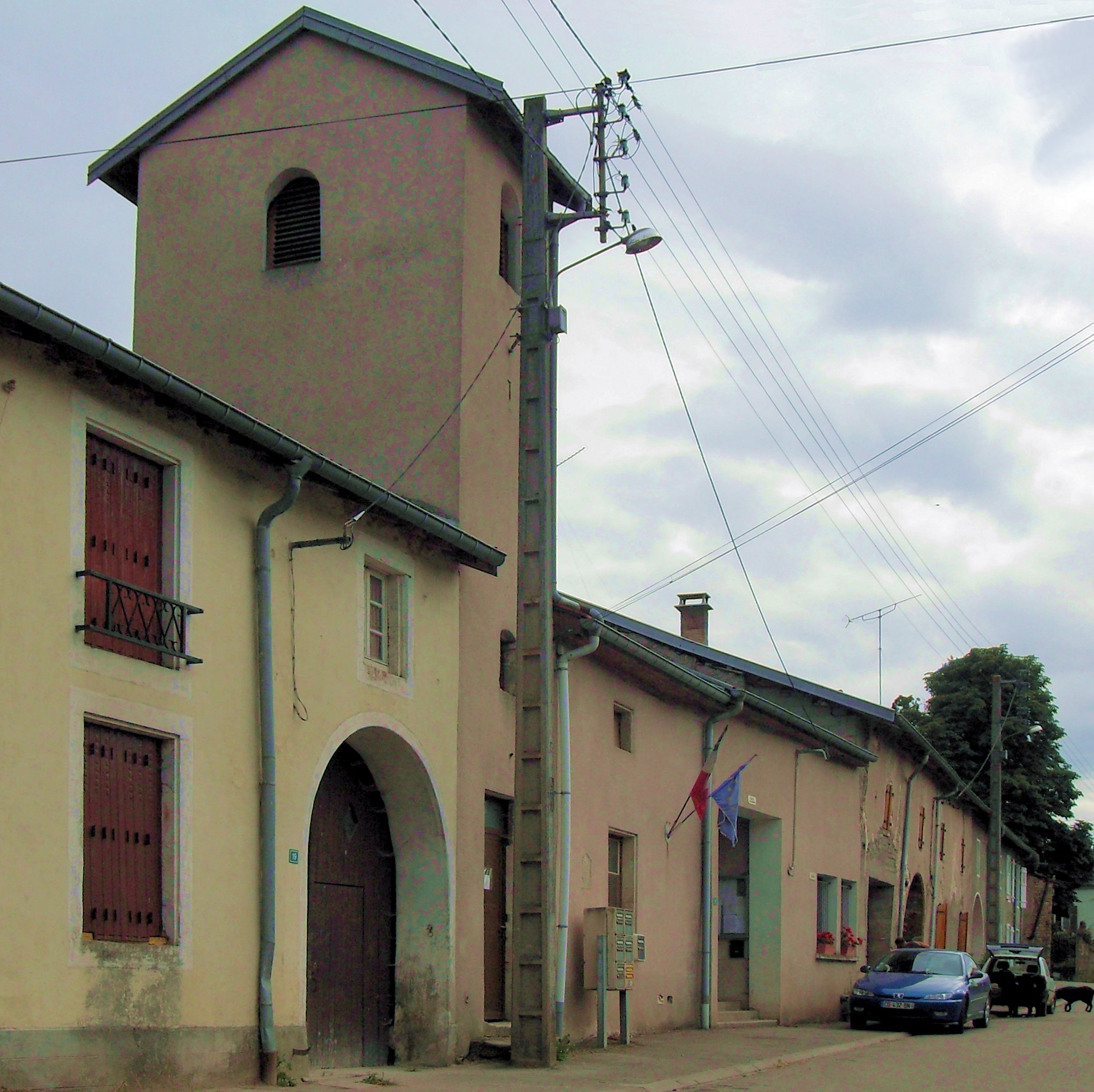
- The town hall in Pont-sur-Madon

- Coat of arms
- Location of Pont-sur-Madon
- Location within France Location within Grand Est
- Coordinates: 48°22′14″N 6°09′14″E
- Country: France
- Region: Grand Est
- Department: Vosges
- Arrondissement: Neufchâteau
- Canton: Charmes
- Intercommunality: CC Mirecourt Dompaire

Government
  - Mayor (2020–2026): David Prévot-Pierre
- Area^{1}: 3.42 km^{2} (1.32 sq mi)
- Elevation: 340 m (1,120 ft)
- Highest elevation: 357 m (1,171 ft)
- Lowest elevation: 250 m (820 ft)
- Population (2023): 178
  - Density: 52.0/km^{2} (135/sq mi)
- Time zone: UTC+01:00 (CET)
  - Summer (DST): UTC+02:00 (CEST)
- INSEE/Postal code: 88354 /88500
- ^{1} French Land Register data, which excludes lakes, ponds, glaciers > 1 km^{2} (0.386 sq mi or 247 acres) and river estuaries.

Pont-sur-Madon (French pronunciation: [pɔ̃ syʁ madɔ̃]) is a commune in the Vosges department in Grand Est in northeastern France.

Inhabitants are called Madipontains.

== Geography ==
The river Madon flows through the commune, and the bridge included in the name Pont-sur-Madon (Bridge over the Madon) is still in place.

== See also ==
- Communes of the Vosges department
