= Brantigny =

- Commune
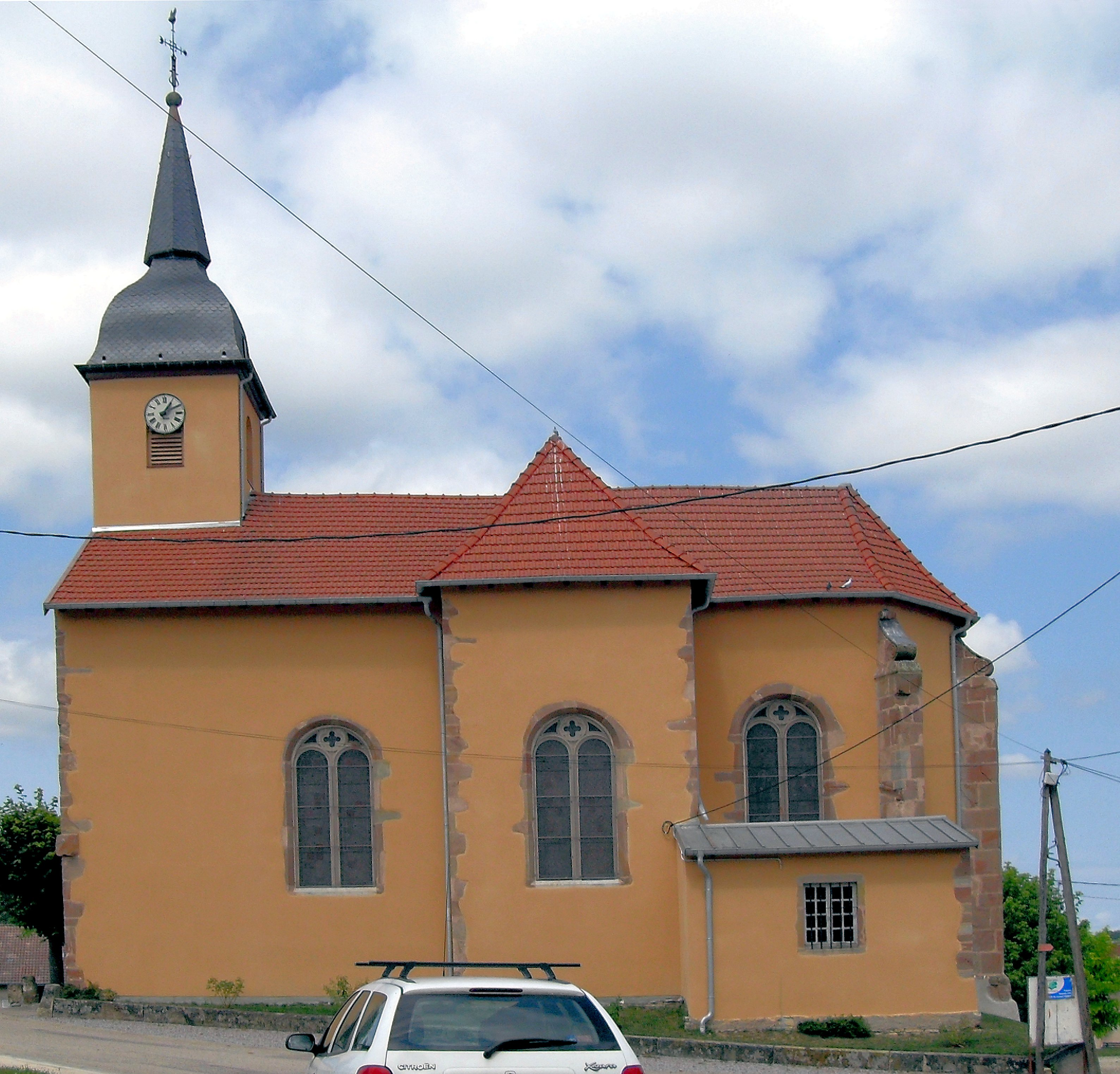
- The church in Brantigny

- Coat of arms
- Location of Brantigny
- Location within France Location within Grand Est
- Coordinates: 48°20′36″N 6°16′40″E
- Country: France
- Region: Grand Est
- Department: Vosges
- Arrondissement: Épinal
- Canton: Charmes
- Intercommunality: CA Épinal

Government
  - Mayor (2020–2026): Alain Guihard
- Area^{1}: 3.01 km^{2} (1.16 sq mi)
- Highest elevation: 402 m (1,319 ft)
- Lowest elevation: 279 m (915 ft)
- Population (2023): 198
  - Density: 65.8/km^{2} (170/sq mi)
- Time zone: UTC+01:00 (CET)
  - Summer (DST): UTC+02:00 (CEST)
- INSEE/Postal code: 88073 /88130
- ^{1} French Land Register data, which excludes lakes, ponds, glaciers > 1 km^{2} (0.386 sq mi or 247 acres) and river estuaries.

Brantigny (French pronunciation: [bʁɑ̃tiɲi]) is a commune in the Vosges department in Grand Est in northeastern France.

== See also ==
- Communes of the Vosges department
