= Association of Bulgnéville communes between Xaintois and Bassigny =

The Association of Bulgnéville communes between Xaintois and Bassigny (French: Communauté de communes de Bulgnéville entre Xaintois et Bassigny) is a former administrative association of communes in the Vosges département of eastern France and in the region of Lorraine. It was created in October 1992. It was merged into the new Communauté de communes Terre d'eau in January 2017.

The full name of the association includes the name Xaintois, an alternative spelling for the district currently more normally names Saintois. The name of Bassigny refers to a fertile area which seems to have been valued since the Roman Empire period. The current territorial extent of these districts is indeterminate.

The association had its administrative offices at the small town of Bulgnéville.

== Composition ==
The Communauté de communes comprised the following communes:

- Aingeville
- Aulnois
- Auzainvilliers
- Belmont-sur-Vair
- Bulgnéville
- Dombrot-sur-Vair
- Domjulien
- Gendreville
- Hagnéville-et-Roncourt
- Houécourt
- Malaincourt
- Morville
- Norroy
- Offroicourt
- Parey-sous-Montfort
- Remoncourt
- Saint-Remimont
- Sandaucourt
- Saulxures-lès-Bulgnéville
- Sauville
- Urville
- La Vacheresse-et-la-Rouillie
- Vaudoncourt
- Vrécourt

The area covered by the association is similar but not identical to the area covered by the former Canton of Bulgnéville. Eighteen of the twenty-four communes listed here are included in both.
