= Canton of Bulgnéville =

Coordinates: 48°12′48″N 5°48′50″E

Bulgnéville
- Former canton
- Interactive map of Bulgnéville
- Country: France
- Region: Grand Est
- Department: Vosges
- No. of communes: {{{nbcomm}}}
- Disbanded: 2015
- Area: 211.56 km^{2} (81.68 sq mi)
- Population (2012): 5,777
  - Density: 27.31/km^{2} (70.72/sq mi)

The Canton of Bulgnéville is a French former administrative and electoral grouping of communes in the Vosges département of eastern France and in the region of Lorraine. It was disbanded following the French canton reorganisation which came into effect in March 2015. It consisted of 12 communes, which joined the canton of Vittel in 2015. It had 5,777 inhabitants (2012).

Positioned within the Arrondissement of Neufchâteau, the canton had its administrative centre at Bulgnéville.

== Composition ==
The Canton of Bulgnéville comprised the following 24 communes:

- Aingeville
- Aulnois
- Auzainvilliers
- Belmont-sur-Vair
- Bulgnéville
- Crainvilliers
- Dombrot-sur-Vair
- Gendreville
- Hagnéville-et-Roncourt
- La Vacheresse-et-la-Rouillie
- Malaincourt
- Mandres-sur-Vair
- Médonville
- Morville
- Norroy
- Parey-sous-Montfort
- Saint-Ouen-lès-Parey
- Saint-Remimont
- Saulxures-lès-Bulgnéville
- Sauville
- Suriauville
- Urville
- Vaudoncourt
- Vrécourt
