= Viviers-lès-Offroicourt =

- Commune
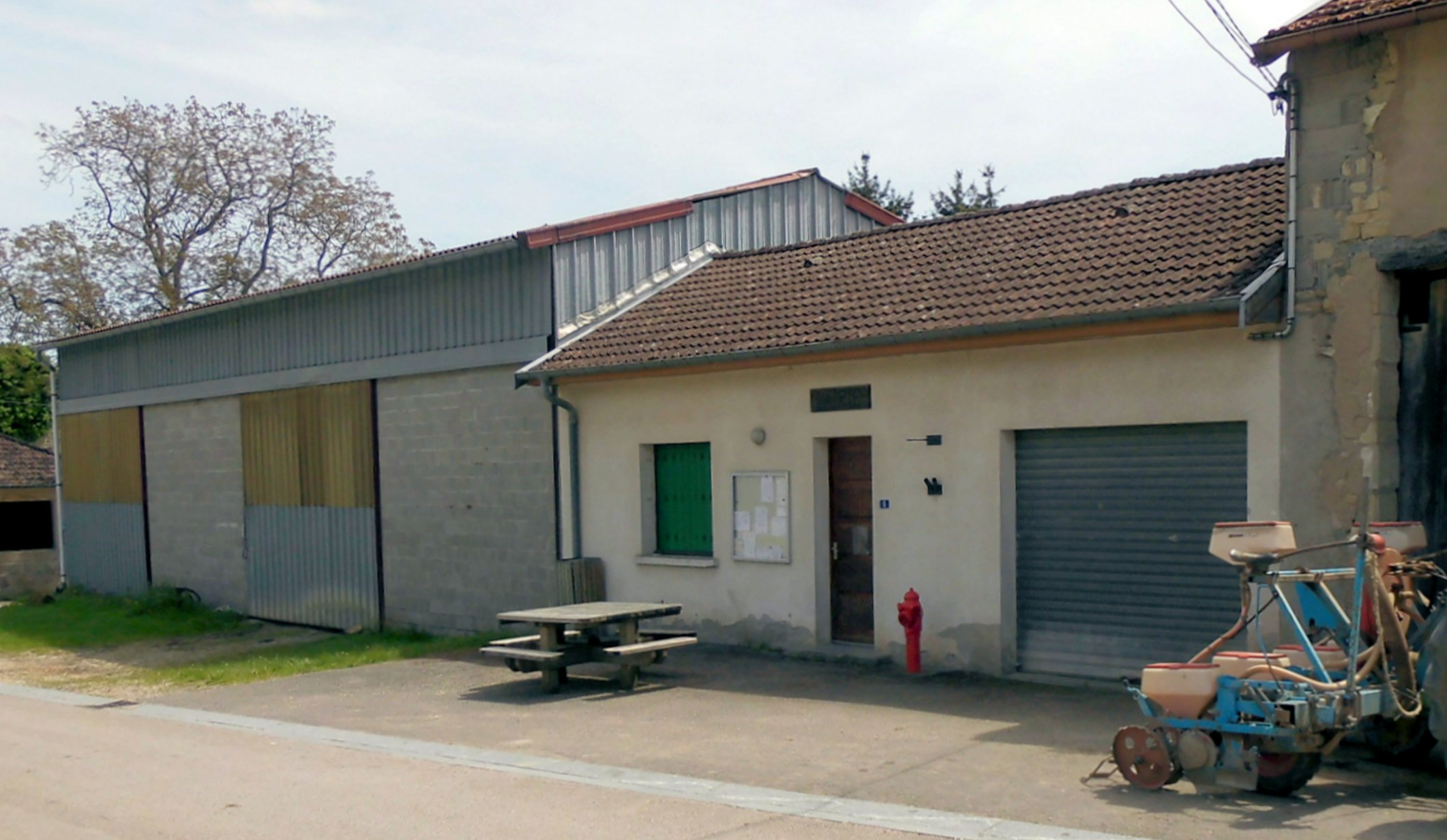
- The town hall in Viviers-lès-Offroicourt
- Location of Viviers-lès-Offroicourt
- Location within France Location within Grand Est
- Coordinates: 48°16′14″N 6°01′32″E
- Country: France
- Region: Grand Est
- Department: Vosges
- Arrondissement: Neufchâteau
- Canton: Vittel
- Intercommunality: Terre d'eau

Government
  - Mayor (2022–2026): Anne Riche-Marchal
- Area^{1}: 4.52 km^{2} (1.75 sq mi)
- Elevation: 320 m (1,050 ft)
- Highest elevation: 427 m (1,401 ft)
- Lowest elevation: 309 m (1,014 ft)
- Population (2023): 26
  - Density: 5.8/km^{2} (15/sq mi)
- Time zone: UTC+01:00 (CET)
  - Summer (DST): UTC+02:00 (CEST)
- INSEE/Postal code: 88518 /88500
- ^{1} French Land Register data, which excludes lakes, ponds, glaciers > 1 km^{2} (0.386 sq mi or 247 acres) and river estuaries.

Viviers-lès-Offroicourt (French pronunciation: [vivje lɛ.z‿ɔfʁwakuʁ], literally Viviers near Offroicourt) is a commune in the Vosges department in Grand Est in northeastern France.

== See also ==
- Communes of the Vosges department
