= Arrondissement of Neufchâteau, Vosges =

Coordinates: 48°21′N 5°41′E

Neufchâteau
- Arrondissement
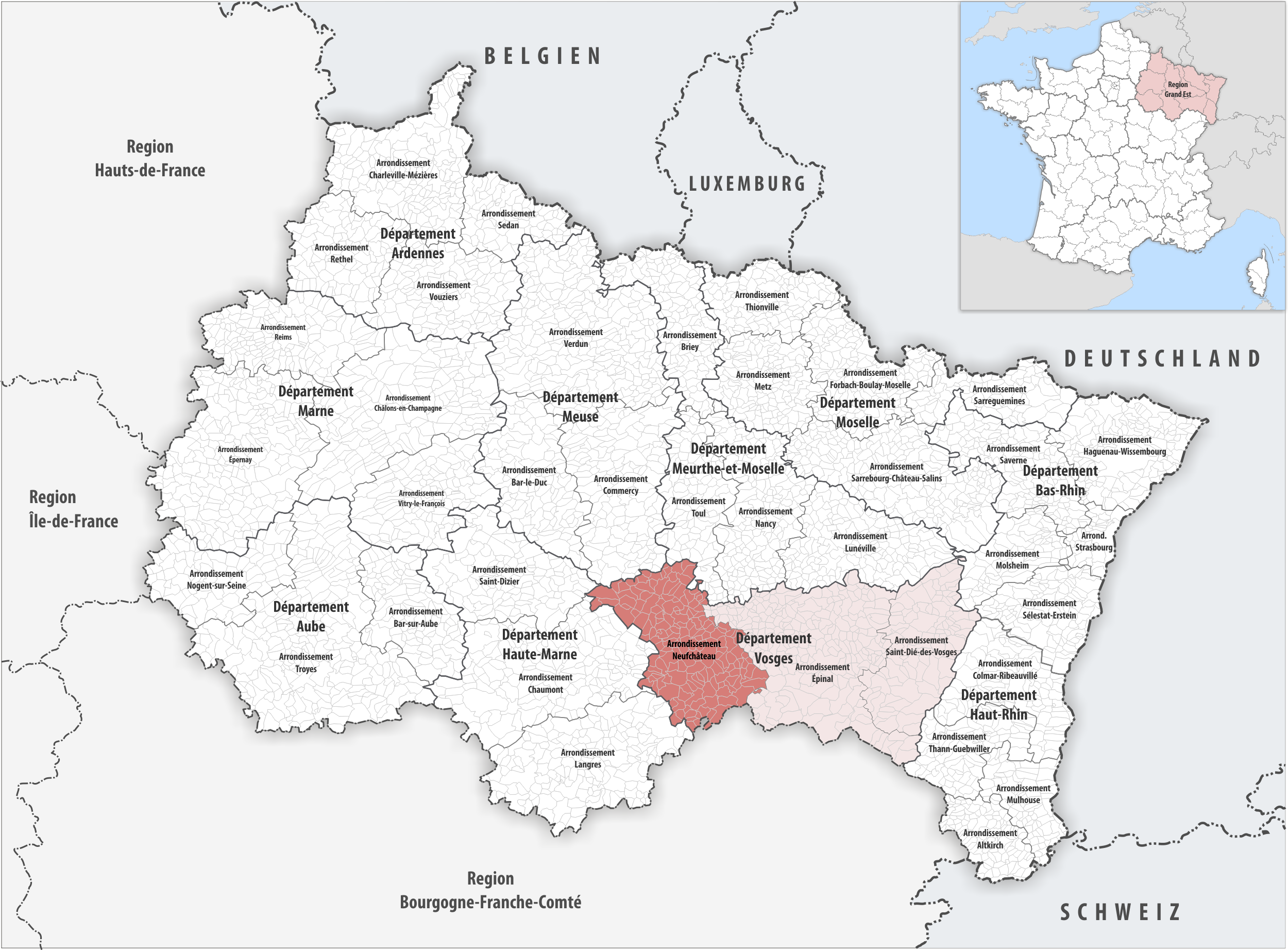
- Location within the region Grand Est
- Country: France
- Region: Grand Est
- Department: Vosges
- No. of communes: {{{nbcomm}}}
- Area: 2,291.2 km^{2} (884.6 sq mi)
- Population (2023): 69,448
  - Density: 30.311/km^{2} (78.504/sq mi)
- INSEE code: 882

The arrondissement of Neufchâteau is an arrondissement of France in the Vosges department in the Grand Est region. It has 250 communes. Its population is 70,442 (2021), and its area is 2,291.2 km^{2} (884.6 sq mi).

== Composition ==
The communes of the arrondissement of Neufchâteau are:

1. Les Ableuvenettes (88001)
2. Ahéville (88002)
3. Aingeville (88003)
4. Ainvelle (88004)
5. Ambacourt (88006)
6. Ameuvelle (88007)
7. Aouze (88010)
8. Aroffe (88013)
9. Attignéville (88015)
10. Attigny (88016)
11. Aulnois (88017)
12. Autigny-la-Tour (88019)
13. Autreville (88020)
14. Auzainvilliers (88022)
15. Avillers (88023)
16. Avrainville (88024)
17. Avranville (88025)
18. Bainville-aux-Saules (88030)
19. Balléville (88031)
20. Barville (88036)
21. Battexey (88038)
22. Baudricourt (88039)
23. Bazegney (88041)
24. Bazoilles-et-Ménil (88043)
25. Bazoilles-sur-Meuse (88044)
26. Beaufremont (88045)
27. Begnécourt (88047)
28. Belmont-lès-Darney (88049)
29. Belmont-sur-Vair (88051)
30. Belrupt (88052)
31. Bettegney-Saint-Brice (88055)
32. Bettoncourt (88056)
33. Biécourt (88058)
34. Blémerey (88060)
35. Bleurville (88061)
36. Blevaincourt (88062)
37. Bocquegney (88063)
38. Bonvillet (88065)
39. Boulaincourt (88066)
40. Bouxières-aux-Bois (88069)
41. Bouxurulles (88070)
42. Bouzemont (88071)
43. Brechainville (88074)
44. Bulgnéville (88079)
45. Certilleux (88083)
46. Châtenois (88095)
47. Châtillon-sur-Saône (88096)
48. Chauffecourt (88097)
49. Chef-Haut (88100)
50. Chermisey (88102)
51. Circourt (88103)
52. Circourt-sur-Mouzon (88104)
53. Claudon (88105)
54. Clérey-la-Côte (88107)
55. Contrexéville (88114)
56. Courcelles-sous-Châtenois (88117)
57. Coussey (88118)
58. Crainvilliers (88119)
59. Damas-et-Bettegney (88122)
60. Damblain (88123)
61. Darney (88124)
62. Darney-aux-Chênes (88125)
63. Derbamont (88129)
64. Dolaincourt (88137)
65. Dombasle-devant-Darney (88138)
66. Dombasle-en-Xaintois (88139)
67. Dombrot-le-Sec (88140)
68. Dombrot-sur-Vair (88141)
69. Domèvre-sous-Montfort (88144)
70. Domjulien (88146)
71. Dommartin-aux-Bois (88147)
72. Dommartin-lès-Vallois (88149)
73. Dommartin-sur-Vraine (88150)
74. Dompaire (88151)
75. Domrémy-la-Pucelle (88154)
76. Domvallier (88155)
77. Escles (88161)
78. Esley (88162)
79. Estrennes (88164)
80. Évaux-et-Ménil (88166)
81. Fignévelle (88171)
82. Fouchécourt (88179)
83. Frain (88180)
84. Frebécourt (88183)
85. Frenelle-la-Grande (88185)
86. Frenelle-la-Petite (88186)
87. Frénois (88187)
88. Fréville (88189)
89. Gelvécourt-et-Adompt (88192)
90. Gemmelaincourt (88194)
91. Gendreville (88195)
92. Gignéville (88199)
93. Gircourt-lès-Viéville (88202)
94. Gironcourt-sur-Vraine (88206)
95. Godoncourt (88208)
96. Gorhey (88210)
97. Grand (88212)
98. Grandrupt-de-Bains (88214)
99. Greux (88219)
100. Grignoncourt (88220)
101. Gugney-aux-Aulx (88223)
102. Hagécourt (88226)
103. Hagnéville-et-Roncourt (88227)
104. Harchéchamp (88229)
105. Haréville (88231)
106. Harmonville (88232)
107. Harol (88233)
108. Hennecourt (88237)
109. Hennezel (88238)
110. Houécourt (88241)
111. Houéville (88242)
112. Hymont (88246)
113. Isches (88248)
114. Jainvillotte (88249)
115. Jésonville (88252)
116. Jorxey (88254)
117. Jubainville (88255)
118. Juvaincourt (88257)
119. Lamarche (88258)
120. Landaville (88259)
121. Légéville-et-Bonfays (88264)
122. Lemmecourt (88265)
123. Lerrain (88267)
124. Liffol-le-Grand (88270)
125. Lignéville (88271)
126. Lironcourt (88272)
127. Longchamp-sous-Châtenois (88274)
128. Maconcourt (88278)
129. Madecourt (88279)
130. Madegney (88280)
131. Madonne-et-Lamerey (88281)
132. Malaincourt (88283)
133. Mandres-sur-Vair (88285)
134. Marainville-sur-Madon (88286)
135. Marey (88287)
136. Maroncourt (88288)
137. Martigny-les-Bains (88289)
138. Martigny-les-Gerbonvaux (88290)
139. Martinvelle (88291)
140. Mattaincourt (88292)
141. Maxey-sur-Meuse (88293)
142. Mazirot (88295)
143. Médonville (88296)
144. Ménil-en-Xaintois (88299)
145. Midrevaux (88303)
146. Mirecourt (88304)
147. Moncel-sur-Vair (88305)
148. Mont-lès-Lamarche (88307)
149. Mont-lès-Neufchâteau (88308)
150. Monthureux-le-Sec (88309)
151. Monthureux-sur-Saône (88310)
152. Morelmaison (88312)
153. Morizécourt (88314)
154. Morville (88316)
155. Neufchâteau (88321)
156. La Neuveville-sous-Châtenois (88324)
157. La Neuveville-sous-Montfort (88325)
158. Nonville (88330)
159. Norroy (88332)
160. Oëlleville (88334)
161. Offroicourt (88335)
162. Ollainville (88336)
163. Parey-sous-Montfort (88343)
164. Pargny-sous-Mureau (88344)
165. Pierrefitte (88347)
166. Pleuvezain (88350)
167. Pompierre (88352)
168. Pont-lès-Bonfays (88353)
169. Pont-sur-Madon (88354)
170. Poussay (88357)
171. Provenchères-lès-Darney (88360)
172. Punerot (88363)
173. Puzieux (88364)
174. Racécourt (88365)
175. Rainville (88366)
176. Ramecourt (88368)
177. Rancourt (88370)
178. Rapey (88374)
179. Rebeuville (88376)
180. Regnévelle (88377)
181. Regney (88378)
182. Relanges (88381)
183. Remicourt (88382)
184. Remoncourt (88385)
185. Removille (88387)
186. Repel (88389)
187. Robécourt (88390)
188. Romain-aux-Bois (88394)
189. Rouvres-en-Xaintois (88400)
190. Rouvres-la-Chétive (88401)
191. Rozerotte (88403)
192. Rozières-sur-Mouzon (88404)
193. Ruppes (88407)
194. Saint-Baslemont (88411)
195. Saint-Julien (88421)
196. Saint-Menge (88427)
197. Saint-Ouen-lès-Parey (88430)
198. Saint-Paul (88431)
199. Saint-Prancher (88433)
200. Saint-Remimont (88434)
201. Saint-Vallier (88437)
202. Sandaucourt (88440)
203. Sans-Vallois (88441)
204. Sartes (88443)
205. Saulxures-lès-Bulgnéville (88446)
206. Sauville (88448)
207. Senaide (88450)
208. Senonges (88452)
209. Seraumont (88453)
210. Serécourt (88455)
211. Serocourt (88456)
212. Sionne (88457)
213. Soncourt (88459)
214. Soulosse-sous-Saint-Élophe (88460)
215. Suriauville (88461)
216. They-sous-Montfort (88466)
217. Thiraucourt (88469)
218. Les Thons (88471)
219. Thuillières (88472)
220. Tignécourt (88473)
221. Tilleux (88474)
222. Tollaincourt (88475)
223. Totainville (88476)
224. Trampot (88477)
225. Tranqueville-Graux (88478)
226. Urville (88482)
227. La Vacheresse-et-la-Rouillie (88485)
228. Valfroicourt (88488)
229. Valleroy-aux-Saules (88489)
230. Valleroy-le-Sec (88490)
231. Les Vallois (88491)
232. Varmonzey (88493)
233. Vaubexy (88494)
234. Vaudoncourt (88496)
235. Velotte-et-Tatignécourt (88499)
236. Vicherey (88504)
237. Villers (88507)
238. Ville-sur-Illon (88508)
239. Villotte (88510)
240. Villouxel (88511)
241. Viocourt (88514)
242. Vioménil (88515)
243. Vittel (88516)
244. Viviers-le-Gras (88517)
245. Viviers-lès-Offroicourt (88518)
246. Vomécourt-sur-Madon (88522)
247. Vouxey (88523)
248. Vrécourt (88524)
249. Vroville (88525)
250. Xaronval (88529)

== History ==
The arrondissement of Neufchâteau was created in 1800. In January 2013 the two cantons of Darney and Monthureux-sur-Saône passed from the arrondissement of Épinal to the arrondissement of Neufchâteau. At the January 2019 reorganisation of the arrondissements of Vosges, it lost 32 communes to and gained 2 communes from the arrondissement of Épinal. At the January 2024 reorganisation of the arrondissements of Vosges, it gained 76 communes from the arrondissement of Épinal.

As a result of the reorganisation of the cantons of France which came into effect in 2015, the borders of the cantons are no longer related to the borders of the arrondissements. The cantons of the arrondissement of Neufchâteau were, as of January 2015:

1. Bulgnéville
2. Châtenois
3. Coussey
4. Darney
5. Lamarche
6. Mirecourt
7. Monthureux-sur-Saône
8. Neufchâteau
9. Vittel
