= Gemmelaincourt =

- Commune
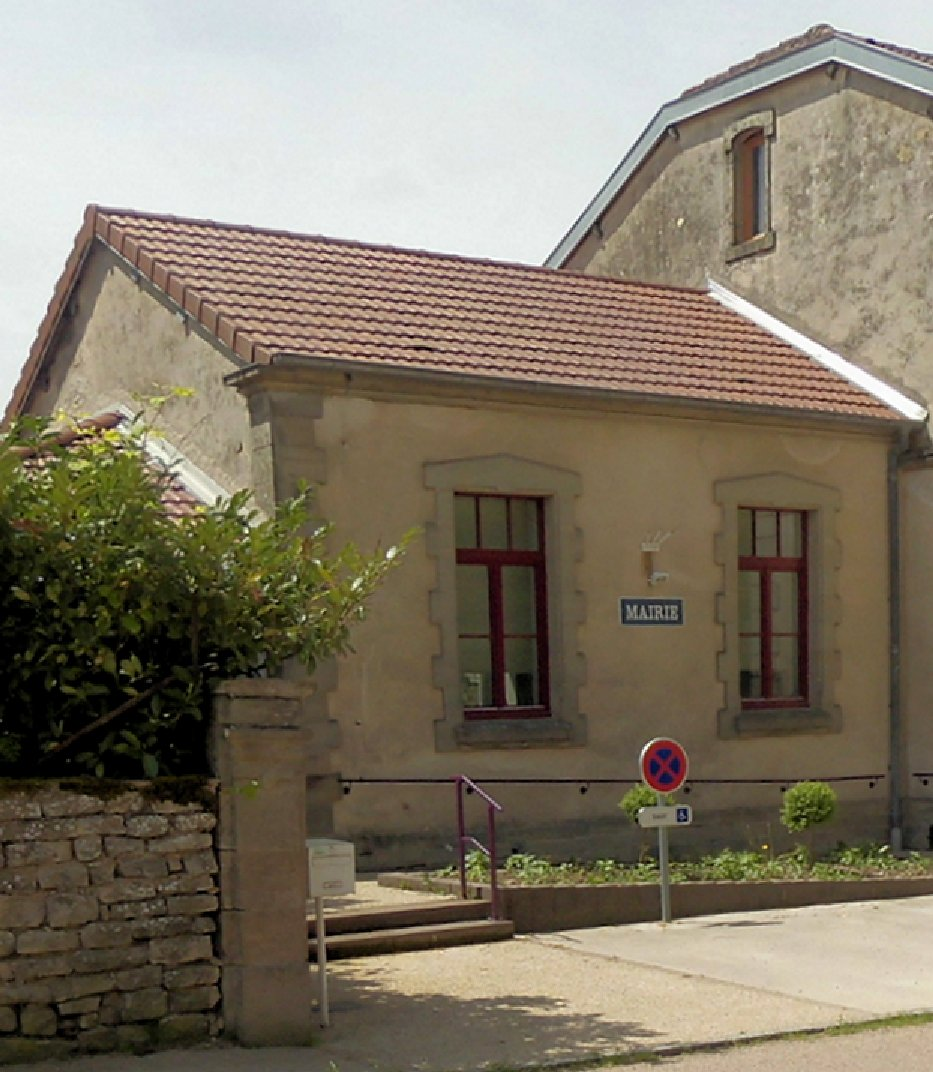
- The town hall and school in Gemmelaincourt
- Location of Gemmelaincourt
- Location within France Location within Grand Est
- Coordinates: 48°16′35″N 5°58′07″E
- Country: France
- Region: Grand Est
- Department: Vosges
- Arrondissement: Neufchâteau
- Canton: Vittel
- Intercommunality: CC Terre d'eau

Government
  - Mayor (2022–2026): Jean-Luc Yardin
- Area^{1}: 7.42 km^{2} (2.86 sq mi)
- Elevation: 379 m (1,243 ft)
- Highest elevation: 431 m (1,414 ft)
- Lowest elevation: 328 m (1,076 ft)
- Population (2023): 120
  - Density: 16/km^{2} (42/sq mi)
- Time zone: UTC+01:00 (CET)
  - Summer (DST): UTC+02:00 (CEST)
- INSEE/Postal code: 88194 /88170
- ^{1} French Land Register data, which excludes lakes, ponds, glaciers > 1 km^{2} (0.386 sq mi or 247 acres) and river estuaries.

Gemmelaincourt (French pronunciation: [ʒɛmlɛ̃kuʁ]) is a commune in the Vosges department in Grand Est in northeastern France. Gemmelaincourt is home to a number of sights such as the church of Saint Maurus, Bassompierre Castle, the manor house ‘Le Jardin des Lys’ and four old wash houses.

== See also ==
- Communes of the Vosges department
- Information about Gemmelaincourt
