= Beaufremont =

- Commune
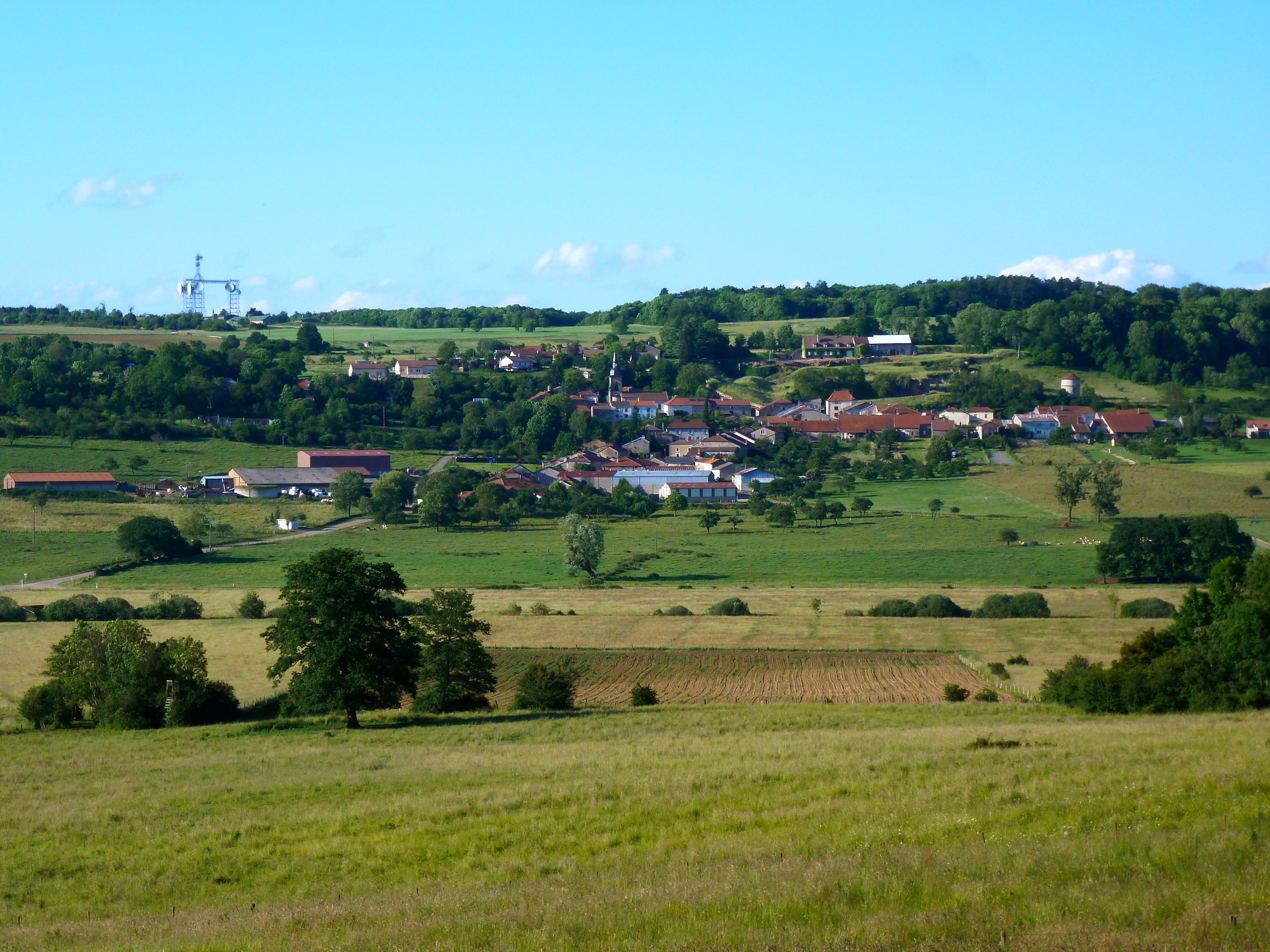
- A general view of Beaufremont

- Coat of arms
- Location of Beaufremont
- Location within France Location within Grand Est
- Coordinates: 48°15′27″N 5°45′19″E
- Country: France
- Region: Grand Est
- Department: Vosges
- Arrondissement: Neufchâteau
- Canton: Neufchâteau
- Intercommunality: CC Terre d'eau

Government
  - Mayor (2022–2026): Robert Ruellet
- Area^{1}: 9.02 km^{2} (3.48 sq mi)
- Elevation: 460 m (1,510 ft)
- Highest elevation: 492 m (1,614 ft)
- Lowest elevation: 348 m (1,142 ft)
- Population (2023): 83
  - Density: 9.2/km^{2} (24/sq mi)
- Time zone: UTC+01:00 (CET)
  - Summer (DST): UTC+02:00 (CEST)
- INSEE/Postal code: 88045 /88300
- ^{1} French Land Register data, which excludes lakes, ponds, glaciers > 1 km^{2} (0.386 sq mi or 247 acres) and river estuaries.

Beaufremont (French pronunciation: [bofʁəmɔ̃]) is a commune in the Vosges department in Grand Est in northeastern France.

== See also ==
- Communes of the Vosges department
