= Thuillières =

- Commune
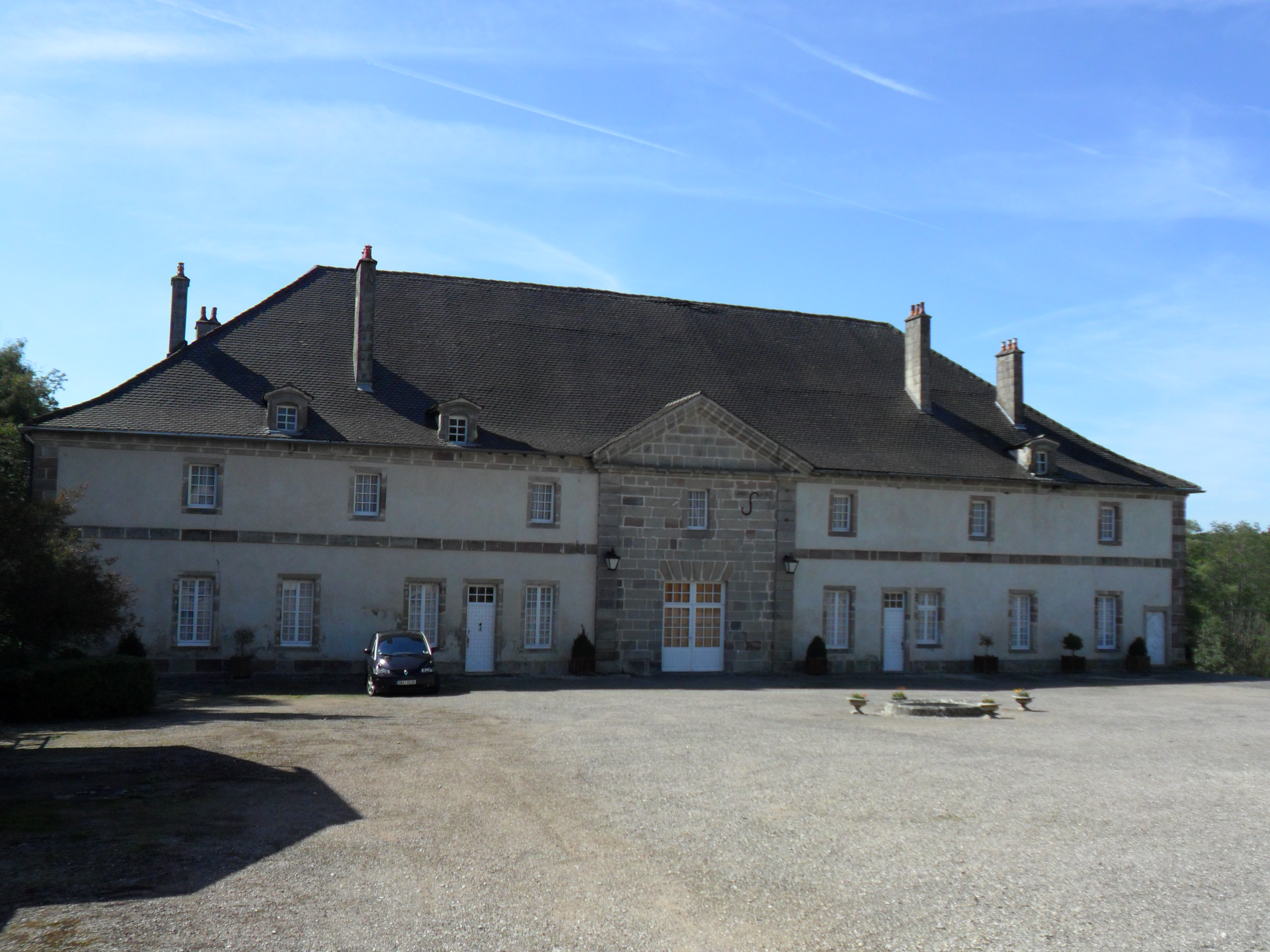
- The chateau in Thuillières

- Coat of arms
- Location of Thuillières
- Location within France Location within Grand Est
- Coordinates: 48°09′21″N 6°00′42″E
- Country: France
- Region: Grand Est
- Department: Vosges
- Arrondissement: Neufchâteau
- Canton: Vittel
- Intercommunality: CC Terre d'eau

Government
  - Mayor (2020–2026): Pierre Bastien
- Area^{1}: 7.62 km^{2} (2.94 sq mi)
- Elevation: 365 m (1,198 ft)
- Highest elevation: 475 m (1,558 ft)
- Lowest elevation: 293 m (961 ft)
- Population (2023): 108
  - Density: 14.2/km^{2} (36.7/sq mi)
- Time zone: UTC+01:00 (CET)
  - Summer (DST): UTC+02:00 (CEST)
- INSEE/Postal code: 88472 /88260
- ^{1} French Land Register data, which excludes lakes, ponds, glaciers > 1 km^{2} (0.386 sq mi or 247 acres) and river estuaries.

Thuillières (French pronunciation: [tɥijɛʁ]) is a commune in the Vosges department in Grand Est in northeastern France.

== See also ==
- Communes of the Vosges department
