= Rozerotte =

- Commune
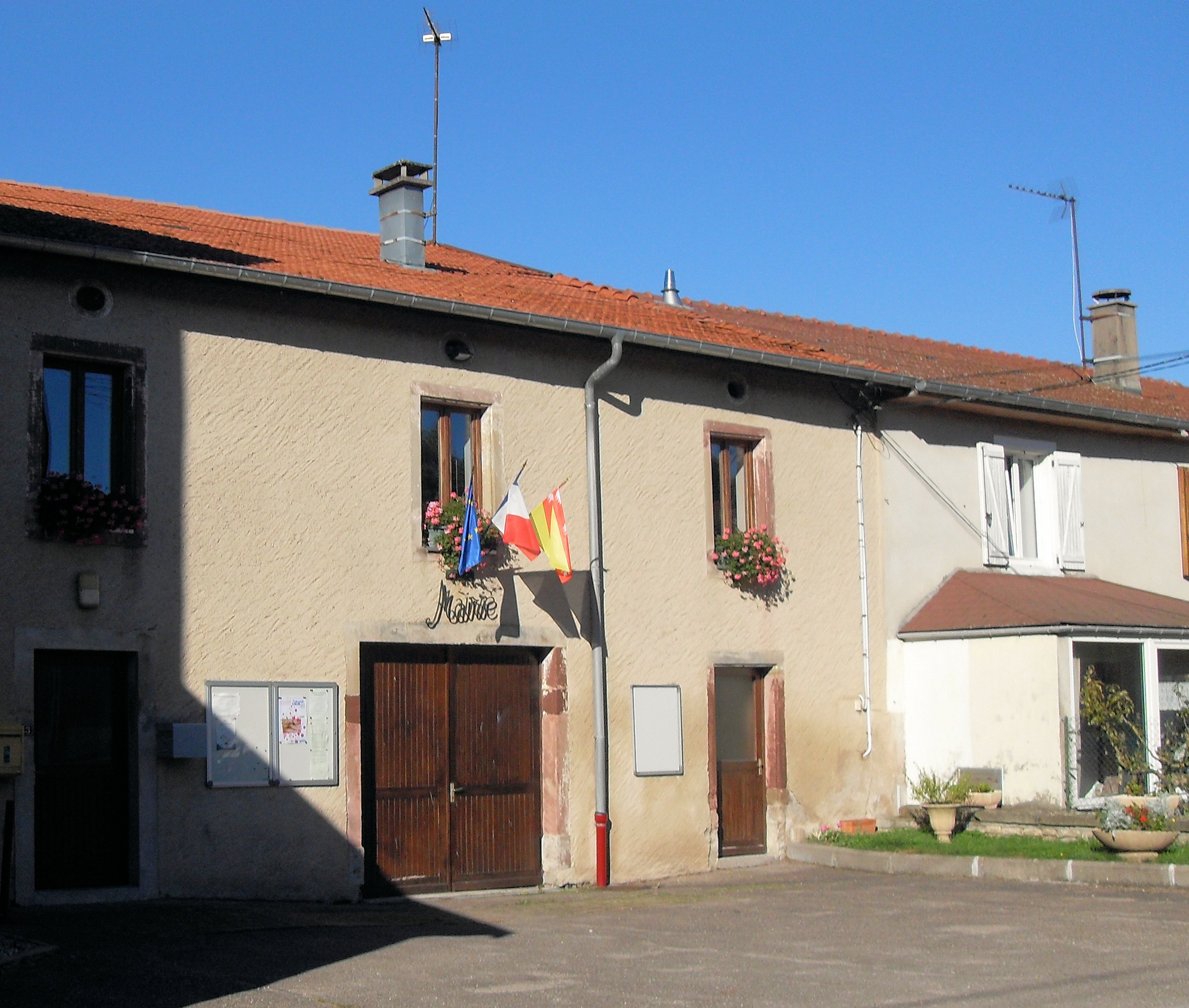
- The town hall in Rozerotte
- Location of Rozerotte
- Location within France Location within Grand Est
- Coordinates: 48°14′33″N 6°04′56″E
- Country: France
- Region: Grand Est
- Department: Vosges
- Arrondissement: Neufchâteau
- Canton: Vittel
- Intercommunality: CC Terre d'eau

Government
  - Mayor (2020–2026): Claude Valdenaire
- Area^{1}: 6.46 km^{2} (2.49 sq mi)
- Elevation: 309 m (1,014 ft)
- Highest elevation: 445 m (1,460 ft)
- Lowest elevation: 287 m (942 ft)
- Population (2023): 181
  - Density: 28.0/km^{2} (72.6/sq mi)
- Time zone: UTC+01:00 (CET)
  - Summer (DST): UTC+02:00 (CEST)
- INSEE/Postal code: 88403 /88500
- ^{1} French Land Register data, which excludes lakes, ponds, glaciers > 1 km^{2} (0.386 sq mi or 247 acres) and river estuaries.

Rozerotte (French pronunciation: [ʁozʁɔt]) is a commune in the Vosges department in Grand Est in northeastern France.

== See also ==
- Communes of the Vosges department
