= La Neuveville-sous-Montfort =

- Commune
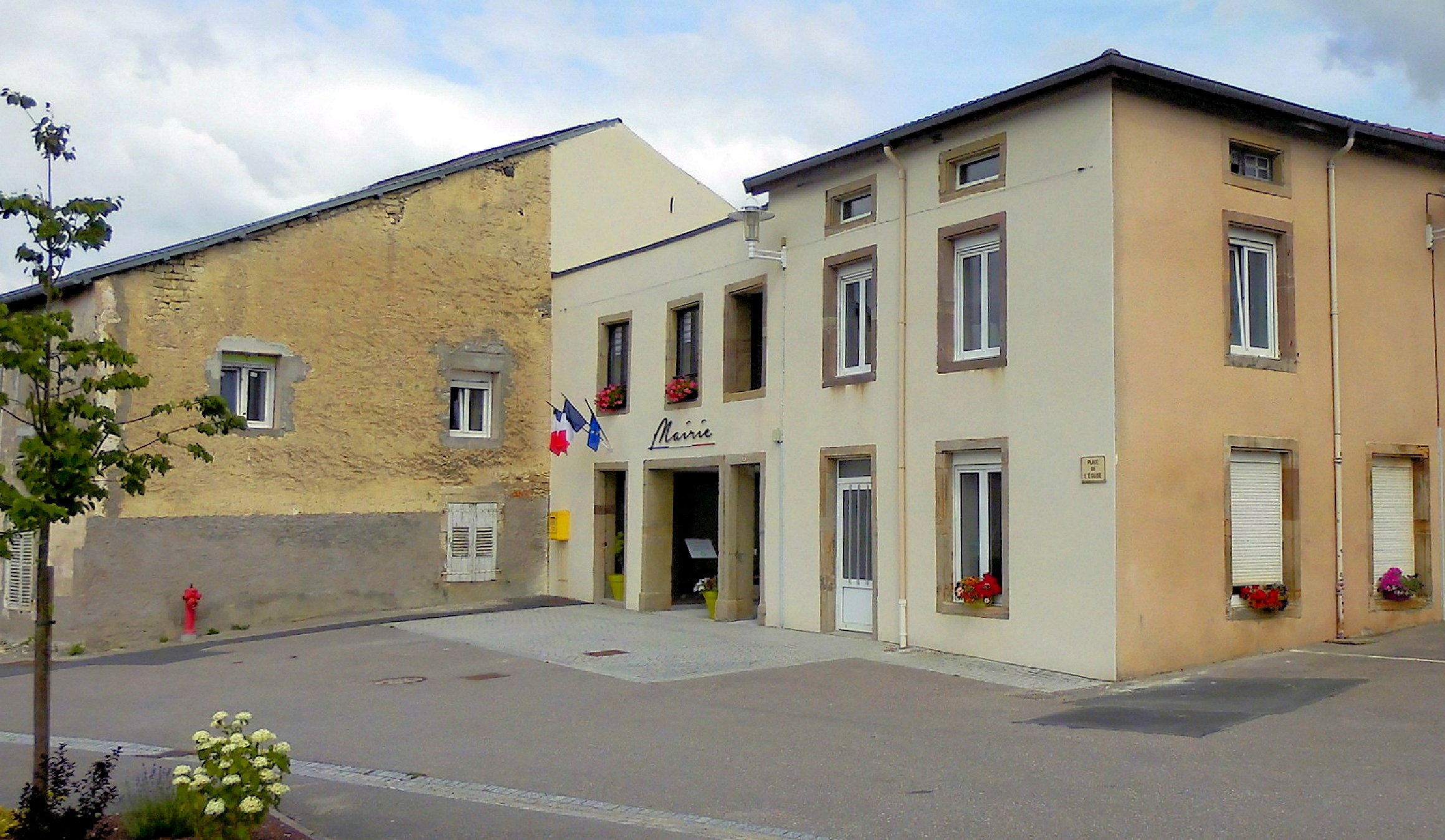
- The town hall in La Neuveville-sous-Montfort

- Coat of arms
- Location of La Neuveville-sous-Montfort
- Location within France Location within Grand Est
- Coordinates: 48°13′31″N 6°01′09″E
- Country: France
- Region: Grand Est
- Department: Vosges
- Arrondissement: Neufchâteau
- Canton: Vittel
- Intercommunality: CC Terre d'eau

Government
  - Mayor (2020–2026): Francis Dehon
- Area^{1}: 10.21 km^{2} (3.94 sq mi)
- Highest elevation: 467 m (1,532 ft)
- Lowest elevation: 324 m (1,063 ft)
- Population (2023): 178
  - Density: 17.4/km^{2} (45.2/sq mi)
- Time zone: UTC+01:00 (CET)
  - Summer (DST): UTC+02:00 (CEST)
- INSEE/Postal code: 88325 /88800
- ^{1} French Land Register data, which excludes lakes, ponds, glaciers > 1 km^{2} (0.386 sq mi or 247 acres) and river estuaries.

La Neuveville-sous-Montfort (French pronunciation: [la nœv.vil su mɔ̃fɔʁ]) is a commune in the Vosges department in Grand Est in northeastern France.

== Geography ==
The village is positioned some 4 kilometres (2 mi) to the north-east of Vittel. Sited on south facing hills that capture the sun, encourages and agricultural economy that includes viticulture, while proximity to a well known spa resort supports the local tourist business: there are a number of well marked walking trails around the village.

== See also ==
- Communes of the Vosges department
