= Valleroy-le-Sec =

- Commune
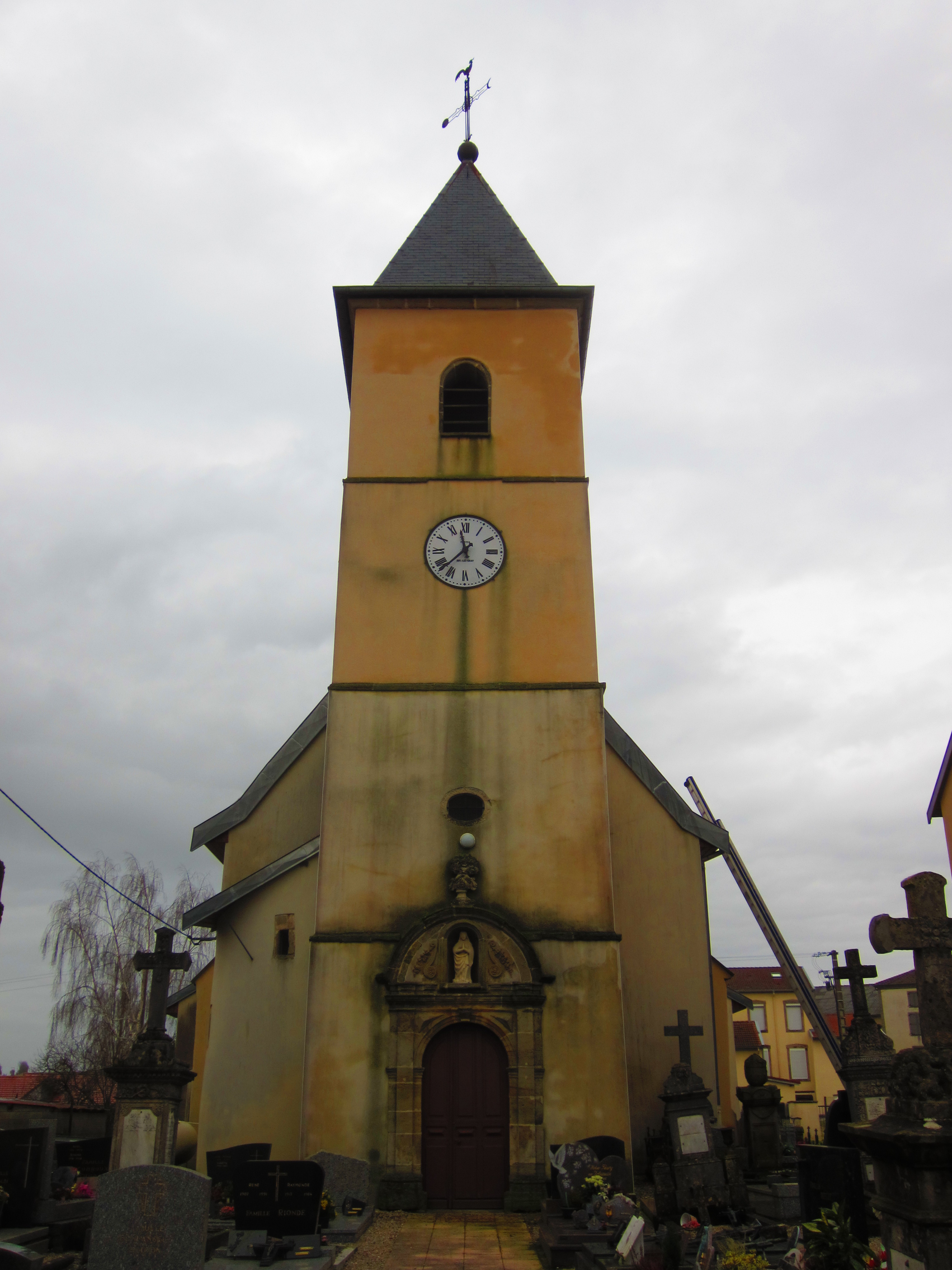
- The church in Valleroy-le-Sec
- Location of Valleroy-le-Sec
- Location within France Location within Grand Est
- Coordinates: 48°11′16″N 6°00′39″E
- Country: France
- Region: Grand Est
- Department: Vosges
- Arrondissement: Neufchâteau
- Canton: Vittel
- Intercommunality: CC Terre d'eau

Government
  - Mayor (2020–2026): Olivier Grosjean
- Area^{1}: 5.87 km^{2} (2.27 sq mi)
- Elevation: 380 m (1,250 ft)
- Highest elevation: 436 m (1,430 ft)
- Lowest elevation: 365 m (1,198 ft)
- Population (2023): 190
  - Density: 32/km^{2} (84/sq mi)
- Time zone: UTC+01:00 (CET)
  - Summer (DST): UTC+02:00 (CEST)
- INSEE/Postal code: 88490 /88800
- ^{1} French Land Register data, which excludes lakes, ponds, glaciers > 1 km^{2} (0.386 sq mi or 247 acres) and river estuaries.

Valleroy-le-Sec (French pronunciation: [valʁwa lə sɛk]) is a commune in the Vosges department in Grand Est in northeastern France.

== See also ==
- Communes of the Vosges department
