= Greux =

- Commune
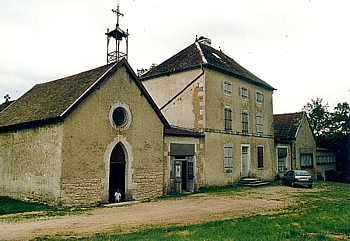
- Chapel of Bermont
- Location of Greux
- Location within France Location within Grand Est
- Coordinates: 48°27′03″N 5°40′38″E
- Country: France
- Region: Grand Est
- Department: Vosges
- Arrondissement: Neufchâteau
- Canton: Coussey
- Intercommunality: CC l'Ouest Vosgien

Government
  - Mayor (2020–2026): Aurélie Pierson
- Area^{1}: 8.04 km^{2} (3.10 sq mi)
- Elevation: 272 m (892 ft)
- Highest elevation: 411 m (1,348 ft)
- Lowest elevation: 264 m (866 ft)
- Population (2023): 130
  - Density: 16/km^{2} (42/sq mi)
- Time zone: UTC+01:00 (CET)
  - Summer (DST): UTC+02:00 (CEST)
- INSEE/Postal code: 88219 /88630
- ^{1} French Land Register data, which excludes lakes, ponds, glaciers > 1 km^{2} (0.386 sq mi or 247 acres) and river estuaries.

Greux (French pronunciation: [ɡʁø]) is a commune in the Vosges department in Grand Est in northeastern France.

== See also ==
- Communes of the Vosges department
