= Communauté de communes Terre d'eau =

Federation of municipalities in France

Terre d'eau
- Communauté de communes
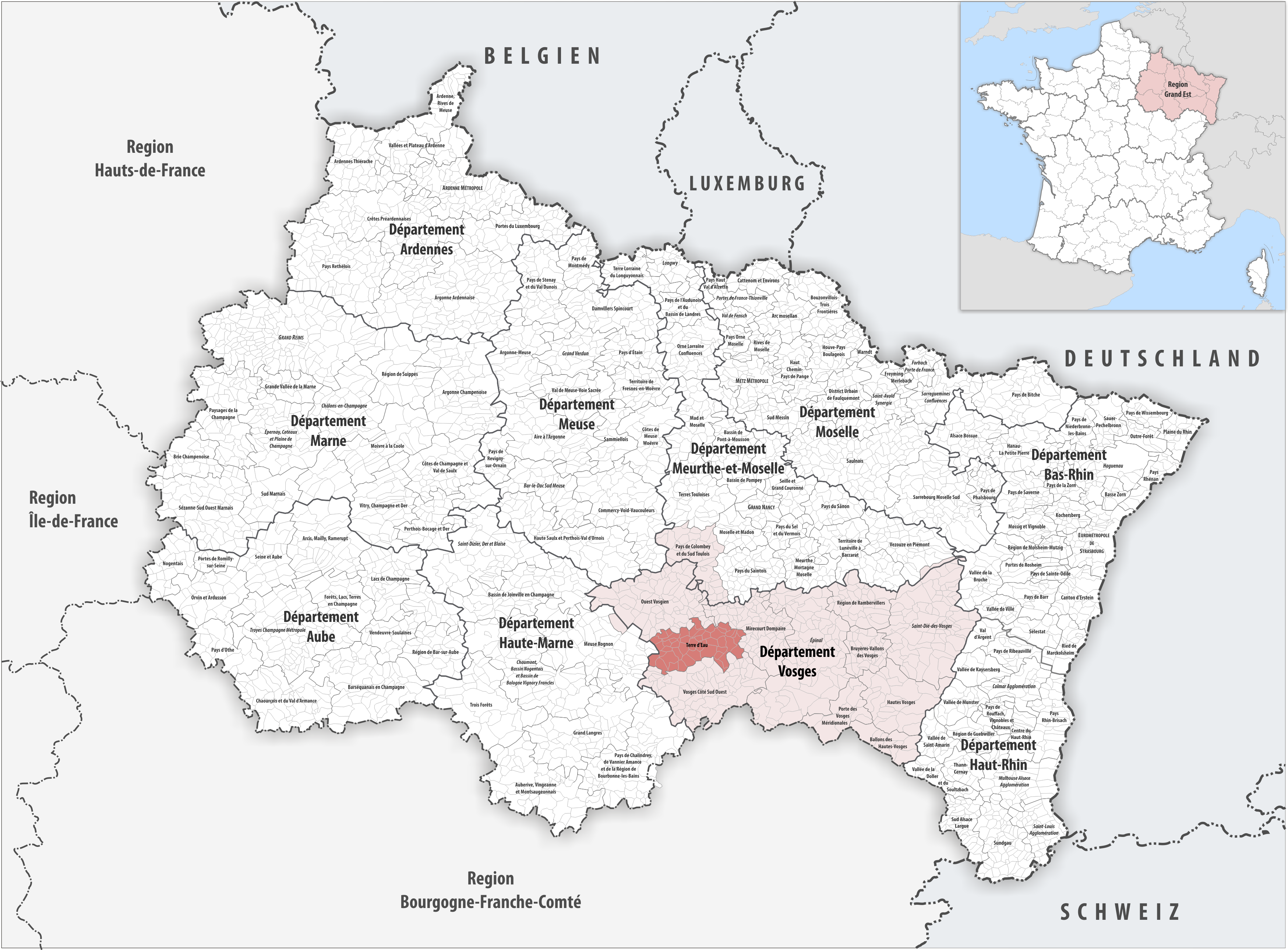
- Location within the region
- Coordinates: 48°12′N 05°50′E
- Country: France
- Region: Grand Est
- Department: Vosges
- No. of communes: {{{nbcomm}}}
- Established: 2017
- Area: 415.2 km^{2} (160.3 sq mi)
- Population (2019): 17,536
  - Density: 42.24/km^{2} (109.4/sq mi)

The Communauté de communes Terre d'eau is an administrative association of rural communes in the Vosges department of eastern France. It was created on 1 January 2017 by the merger of the former Communauté de communes de Bulgnéville entre Xaintois et Bassigny, Communauté de communes de Vittel-Contrexéville and the commune Thuillières. It consists of 45 communes, and has its administrative offices at Bulgnéville. Its area is 415.2 km^{2}, and its population was 17,536 in 2019.

== Composition ==
The communauté de communes consists of the following 45 communes:

1. Aingeville
2. Aulnois
3. Auzainvilliers
4. Bazoilles-et-Ménil
5. Beaufremont
6. Belmont-sur-Vair
7. Bulgnéville
8. Contrexéville
9. Crainvilliers
10. Dombrot-sur-Vair
11. Domèvre-sous-Montfort
12. Domjulien
13. Estrennes
14. Gemmelaincourt
15. Gendreville
16. Hagnéville-et-Roncourt
17. Haréville
18. Houécourt
19. Malaincourt
20. Mandres-sur-Vair
21. Médonville
22. Monthureux-le-Sec
23. Morville
24. La Neuveville-sous-Montfort
25. Norroy
26. Offroicourt
27. Parey-sous-Montfort
28. Remoncourt
29. Rozerotte
30. Saint-Ouen-lès-Parey
31. Saint-Remimont
32. Sandaucourt
33. Saulxures-lès-Bulgnéville
34. Sauville
35. Suriauville
36. They-sous-Montfort
37. Thuillières
38. Urville
39. La Vacheresse-et-la-Rouillie
40. Valfroicourt
41. Valleroy-le-Sec
42. Vaudoncourt
43. Vittel
44. Viviers-lès-Offroicourt
45. Vrécourt
