= Remoncourt, Vosges =

Remoncourt
- Commune
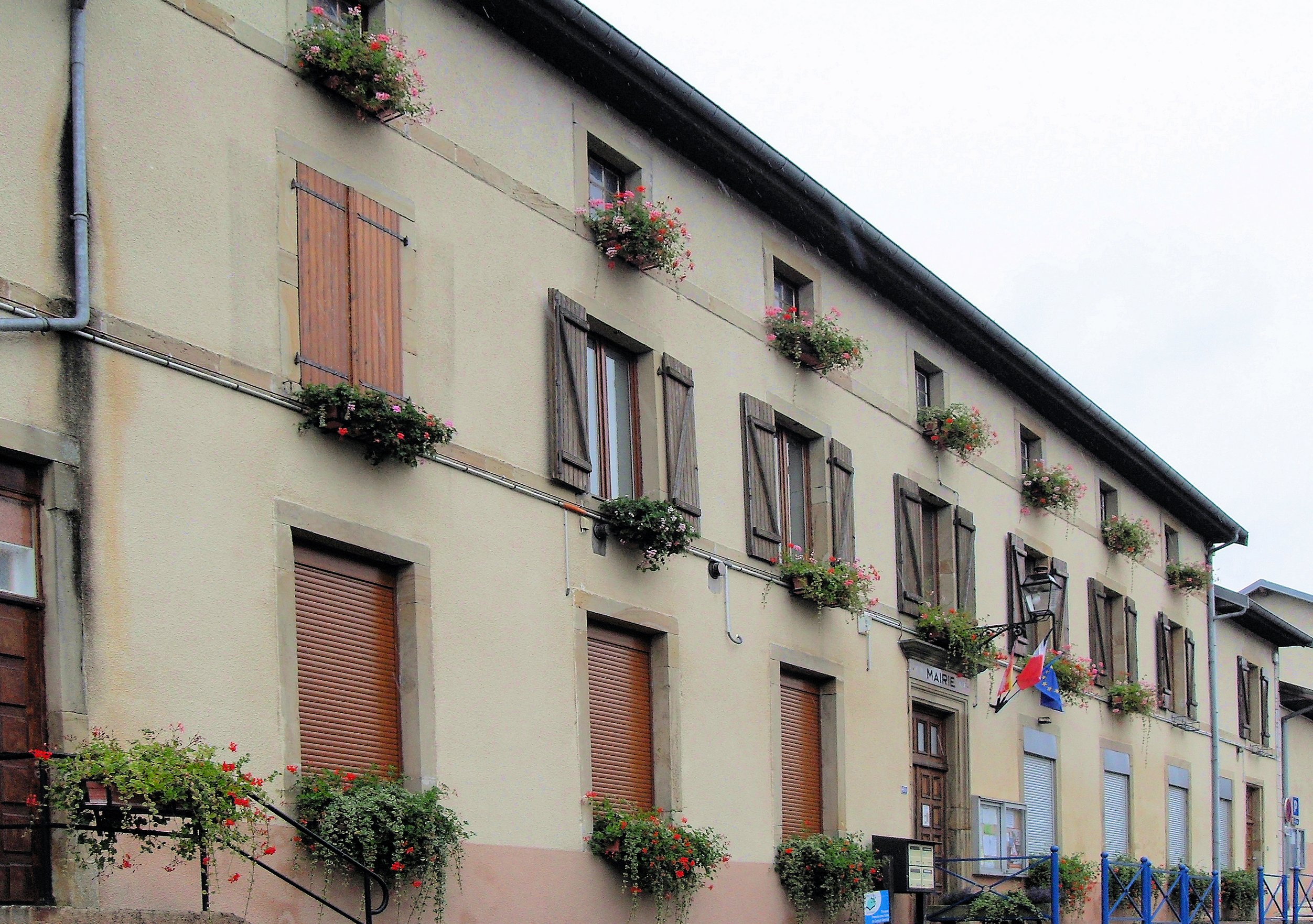
- The town hall in Remoncourt
- Location of Remoncourt
- Location within France Location within Grand Est
- Coordinates: 48°13′49″N 6°03′09″E
- Country: France
- Region: Grand Est
- Department: Vosges
- Arrondissement: Neufchâteau
- Canton: Vittel
- Intercommunality: CC Terre d'eau

Government
  - Mayor (2020–2026): Bernard Tacquard
- Area^{1}: 14.52 km^{2} (5.61 sq mi)
- Highest elevation: 444 m (1,457 ft)
- Lowest elevation: 295 m (968 ft)
- Population (2023): 567
  - Density: 39.0/km^{2} (101/sq mi)
- Time zone: UTC+01:00 (CET)
  - Summer (DST): UTC+02:00 (CEST)
- INSEE/Postal code: 88385 /88800
- ^{1} French Land Register data, which excludes lakes, ponds, glaciers > 1 km^{2} (0.386 sq mi or 247 acres) and river estuaries.

Remoncourt (French pronunciation: [ʁəmɔ̃kuʁ]) is a commune in the Vosges department in Grand Est in northeastern France.

== See also ==
- Communes of the Vosges department
