= Sandaucourt =

- Commune
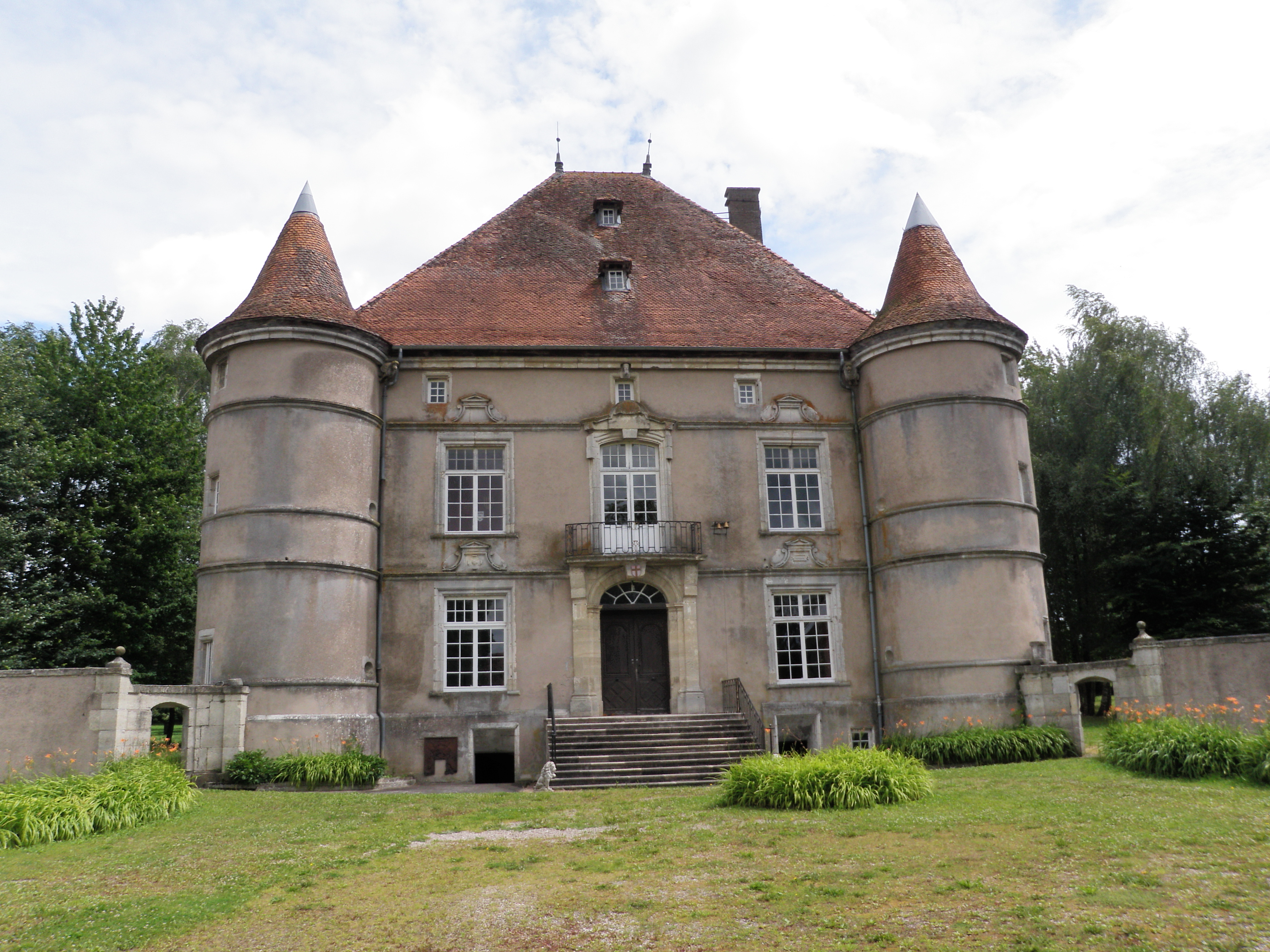
- The chateau in Sandaucourt

- Coat of arms
- Location of Sandaucourt
- Location within France Location within Grand Est
- Coordinates: 48°15′52″N 5°50′48″E
- Country: France
- Region: Grand Est
- Department: Vosges
- Arrondissement: Neufchâteau
- Canton: Mirecourt
- Intercommunality: CC Terre d'eau

Government
  - Mayor (2020–2026): Eric Girard
- Area^{1}: 10.78 km^{2} (4.16 sq mi)
- Elevation: 350 m (1,150 ft)
- Highest elevation: 383 m (1,257 ft)
- Lowest elevation: 320 m (1,050 ft)
- Population (2023): 181
  - Density: 16.8/km^{2} (43.5/sq mi)
- Time zone: UTC+01:00 (CET)
  - Summer (DST): UTC+02:00 (CEST)
- INSEE/Postal code: 88440 /88170
- ^{1} French Land Register data, which excludes lakes, ponds, glaciers > 1 km^{2} (0.386 sq mi or 247 acres) and river estuaries.

Sandaucourt (French pronunciation: [sɑ̃dokuʁ]) is a commune in the Vosges department in Grand Est in northeastern France.

== See also ==
- Communes of the Vosges department
