= Houécourt =

- Commune
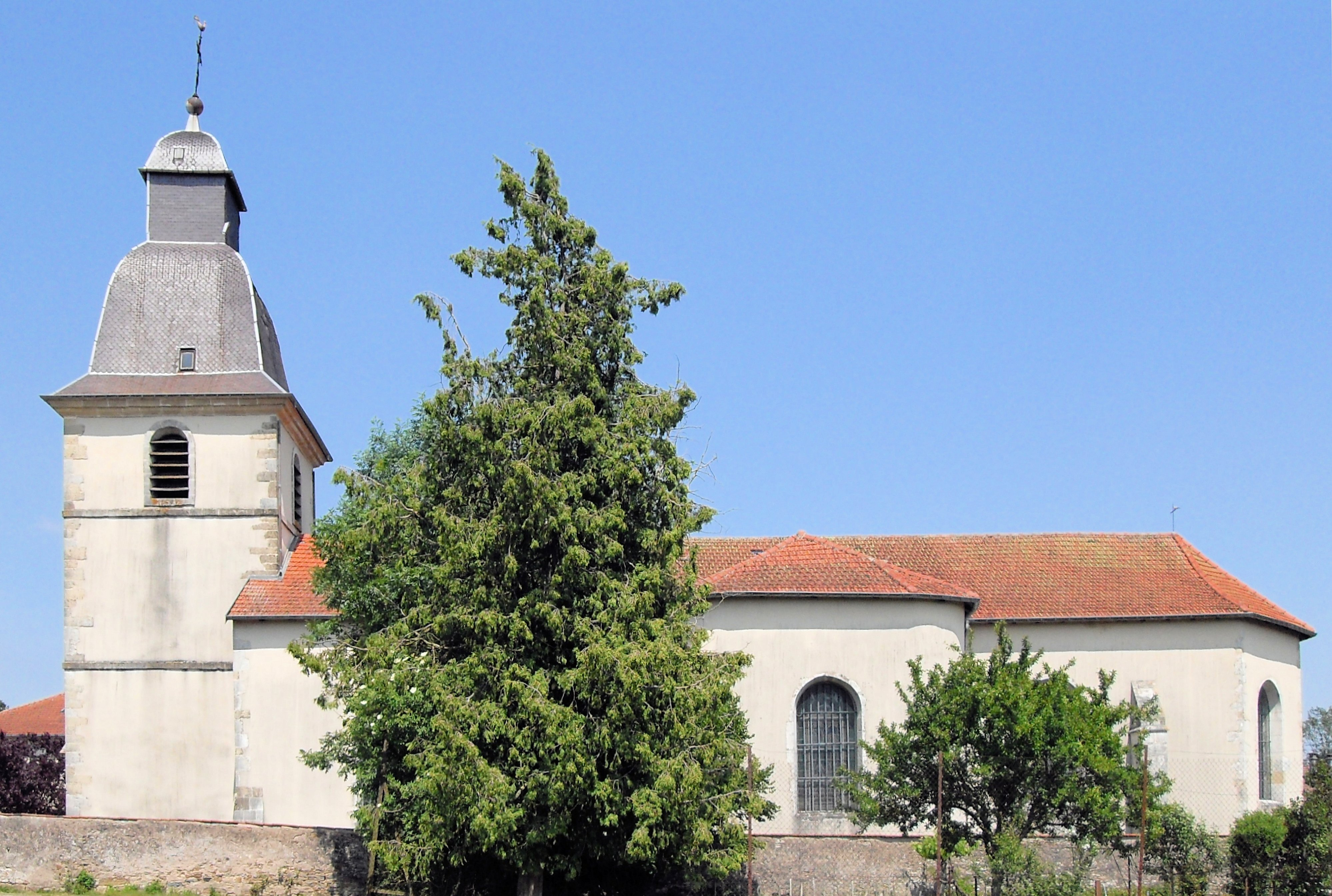
- The church in Houécourt

- Coat of arms
- Location of Houécourt
- Location within France Location within Grand Est
- Coordinates: 48°17′58″N 5°53′40″E
- Country: France
- Region: Grand Est
- Department: Vosges
- Arrondissement: Neufchâteau
- Canton: Mirecourt
- Intercommunality: CC Terre d'eau

Government
  - Mayor (2020–2026): Christian Prévôt
- Area^{1}: 9.91 km^{2} (3.83 sq mi)
- Elevation: 320 m (1,050 ft)
- Highest elevation: 398 m (1,306 ft)
- Lowest elevation: 306 m (1,004 ft)
- Population (2023): 421
  - Density: 42.5/km^{2} (110/sq mi)
- Time zone: UTC+01:00 (CET)
  - Summer (DST): UTC+02:00 (CEST)
- INSEE/Postal code: 88241 /88170
- ^{1} French Land Register data, which excludes lakes, ponds, glaciers > 1 km^{2} (0.386 sq mi or 247 acres) and river estuaries.

Houécourt (French pronunciation: [wekuʁ]) is a commune in the Vosges department in Grand Est in northeastern France.

== See also ==
- Communes of the Vosges department
