= Domjulien =

- Commune
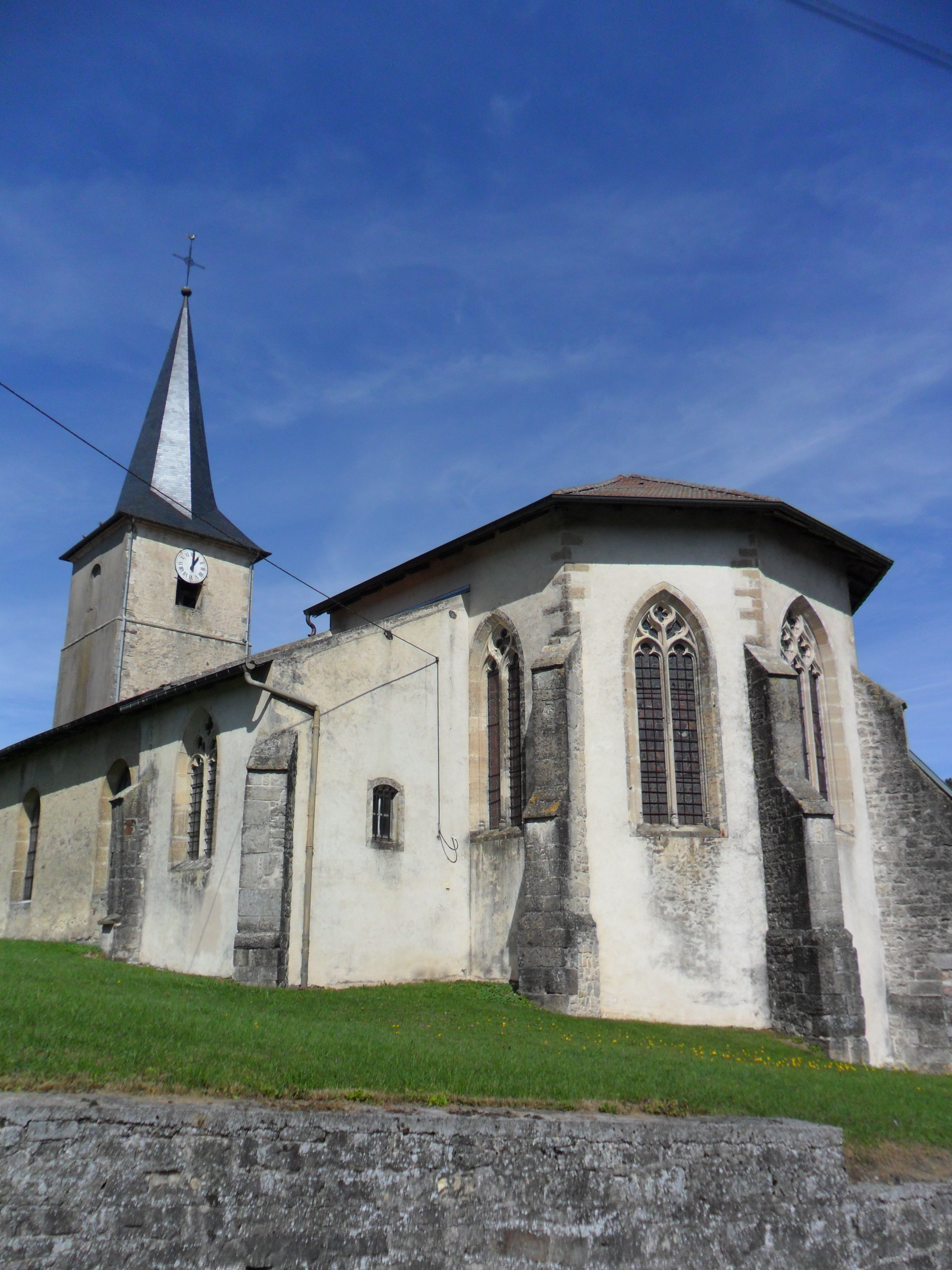
- The church in Domjulien

- Coat of arms
- Location of Domjulien
- Location within France Location within Grand Est
- Coordinates: 48°15′12″N 5°59′52″E
- Country: France
- Region: Grand Est
- Department: Vosges
- Arrondissement: Neufchâteau
- Canton: Vittel
- Intercommunality: CC Terre d'eau

Government
  - Mayor (2020–2026): Michel Guilgot
- Area^{1}: 11.94 km^{2} (4.61 sq mi)
- Elevation: 281 m (922 ft)
- Highest elevation: 455 m (1,493 ft)
- Lowest elevation: 322 m (1,056 ft)
- Population (2023): 178
  - Density: 14.9/km^{2} (38.6/sq mi)
- Time zone: UTC+01:00 (CET)
  - Summer (DST): UTC+02:00 (CEST)
- INSEE/Postal code: 88146 /88800
- ^{1} French Land Register data, which excludes lakes, ponds, glaciers > 1 km^{2} (0.386 sq mi or 247 acres) and river estuaries.

Domjulien (French pronunciation: [dɔ̃ʒyljɛ̃]) is a commune in the Vosges department in Grand Est in northeastern France.

The town merged with Girovillers-sous-Montfort by decree dated December 13, 1972.

== See also ==
- Communes of the Vosges department
