= Offroicourt =

- Commune
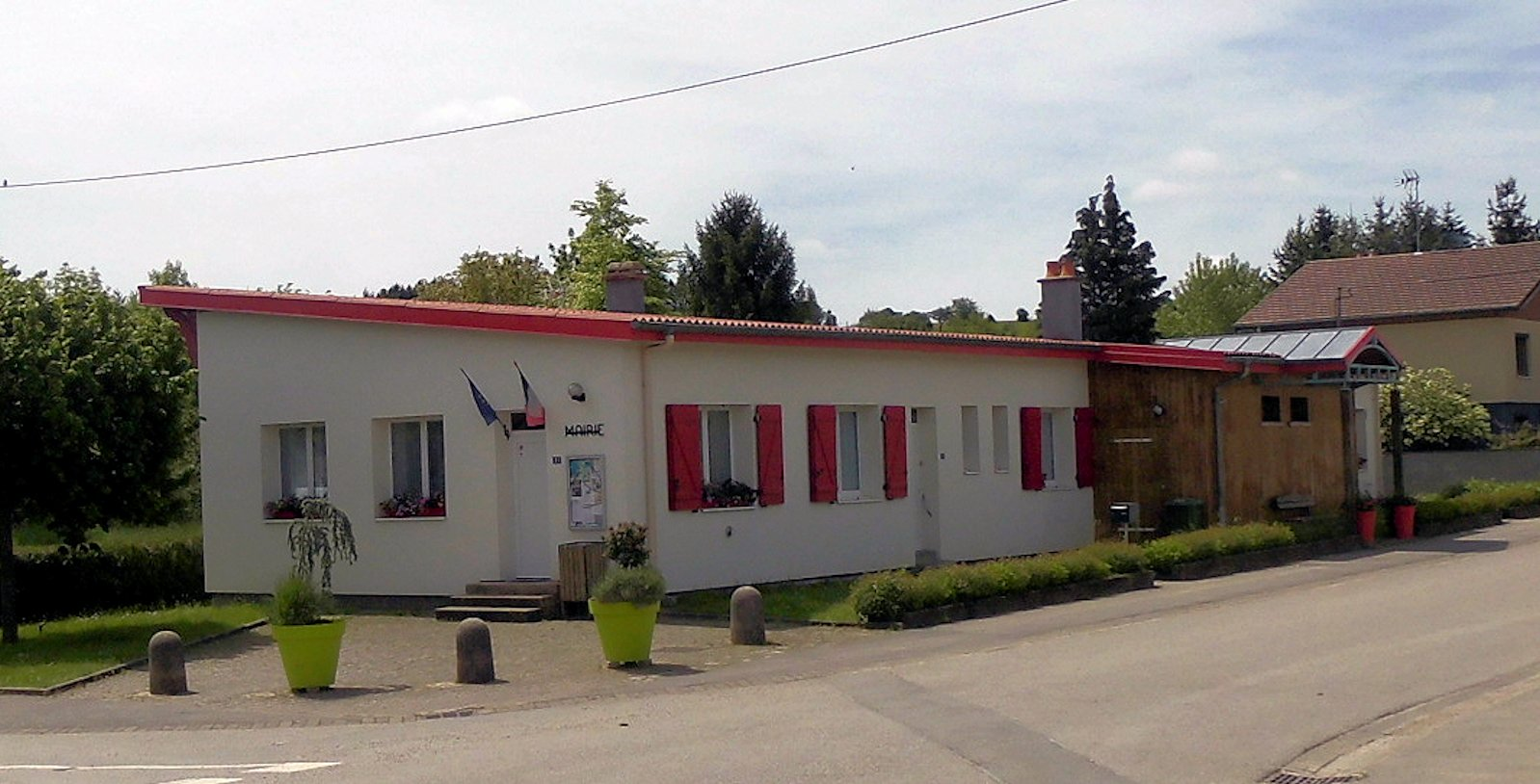
- The town hall in Offroicourt

- Coat of arms
- Location of Offroicourt
- Location within France Location within Grand Est
- Coordinates: 48°16′44″N 6°02′28″E
- Country: France
- Region: Grand Est
- Department: Vosges
- Arrondissement: Neufchâteau
- Canton: Vittel
- Intercommunality: CC Terre d'eau

Government
  - Mayor (2020–2026): Nathalie Brabis
- Area^{1}: 9.33 km^{2} (3.60 sq mi)
- Elevation: 300 m (980 ft)
- Highest elevation: 402 m (1,319 ft)
- Lowest elevation: 293 m (961 ft)
- Population (2023): 145
  - Density: 15.5/km^{2} (40.3/sq mi)
- Time zone: UTC+01:00 (CET)
  - Summer (DST): UTC+02:00 (CEST)
- INSEE/Postal code: 88335 /88500
- ^{1} French Land Register data, which excludes lakes, ponds, glaciers > 1 km^{2} (0.386 sq mi or 247 acres) and river estuaries.

Offroicourt (French pronunciation: [ɔfʁwakuʁ]) is a commune in the Vosges department in Grand Est in northeastern France.

== See also ==
- Communes of the Vosges department
