= Saint-Remimont, Vosges =

Saint-Remimont
- Commune
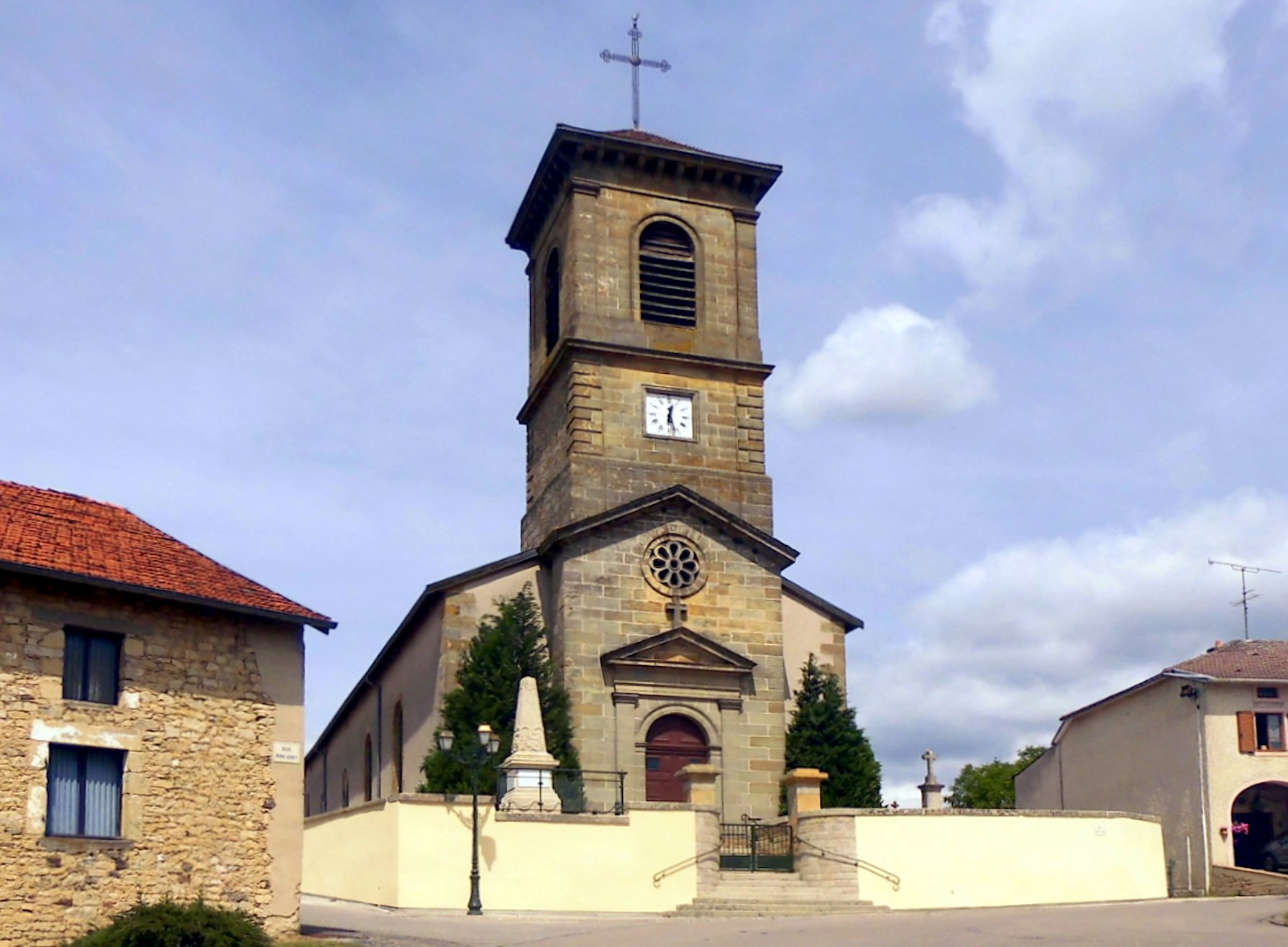
- The church in Saint-Remimont
- Location of Saint-Remimont
- Location within France Location within Grand Est
- Coordinates: 48°14′43″N 5°53′59″E
- Country: France
- Region: Grand Est
- Department: Vosges
- Arrondissement: Neufchâteau
- Canton: Vittel
- Intercommunality: CC Terre d'eau

Government
  - Mayor (2020–2026): Pierrette Félisse
- Area^{1}: 4.6 km^{2} (1.8 sq mi)
- Elevation: 340 m (1,120 ft)
- Highest elevation: 406 m (1,332 ft)
- Lowest elevation: 318 m (1,043 ft)
- Population (2023): 206
  - Density: 45/km^{2} (120/sq mi)
- Time zone: UTC+01:00 (CET)
  - Summer (DST): UTC+02:00 (CEST)
- INSEE/Postal code: 88434 /88800
- ^{1} French Land Register data, which excludes lakes, ponds, glaciers > 1 km^{2} (0.386 sq mi or 247 acres) and river estuaries.

Saint-Remimont (French pronunciation: [sɛ̃ ʁəmimɔ̃]) is a commune in the Vosges department in Grand Est in northeastern France.

== See also ==
- Communes of the Vosges department
