= La Vacheresse-et-la-Rouillie =

- Commune
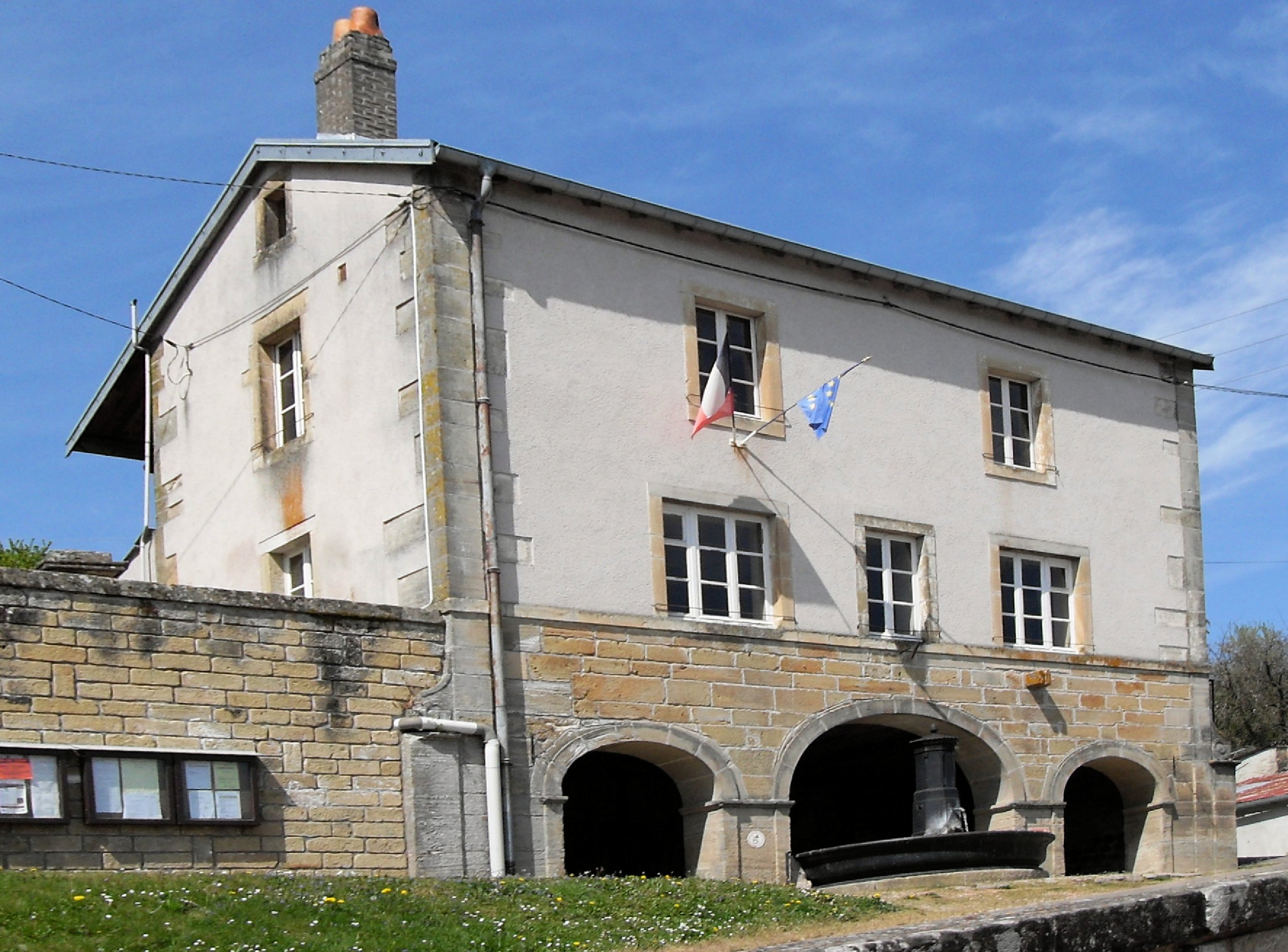
- The town hall and wash house in La Vacheresse-et-la-Rouillie
- Location of La Vacheresse-et-la-Rouillie
- Location within France Location within Grand Est
- Coordinates: 48°08′58″N 5°47′19″E
- Country: France
- Region: Grand Est
- Department: Vosges
- Arrondissement: Neufchâteau
- Canton: Vittel
- Intercommunality: CC Terre d'eau

Government
  - Mayor (2020–2026): Gisèle Dutheil
- Area^{1}: 9.36 km^{2} (3.61 sq mi)
- Highest elevation: 446 m (1,463 ft)
- Lowest elevation: 333 m (1,093 ft)
- Population (2023): 134
  - Density: 14.3/km^{2} (37.1/sq mi)
- Time zone: UTC+01:00 (CET)
  - Summer (DST): UTC+02:00 (CEST)
- INSEE/Postal code: 88485 /88140
- ^{1} French Land Register data, which excludes lakes, ponds, glaciers > 1 km^{2} (0.386 sq mi or 247 acres) and river estuaries.

La Vacheresse-et-la-Rouillie (French pronunciation: [la vaʃʁɛs e laʁuji]) is a commune in the Vosges department in Grand Est in northeastern France.

== See also ==
- Communes of the Vosges department
