= Malaincourt =

- Commune
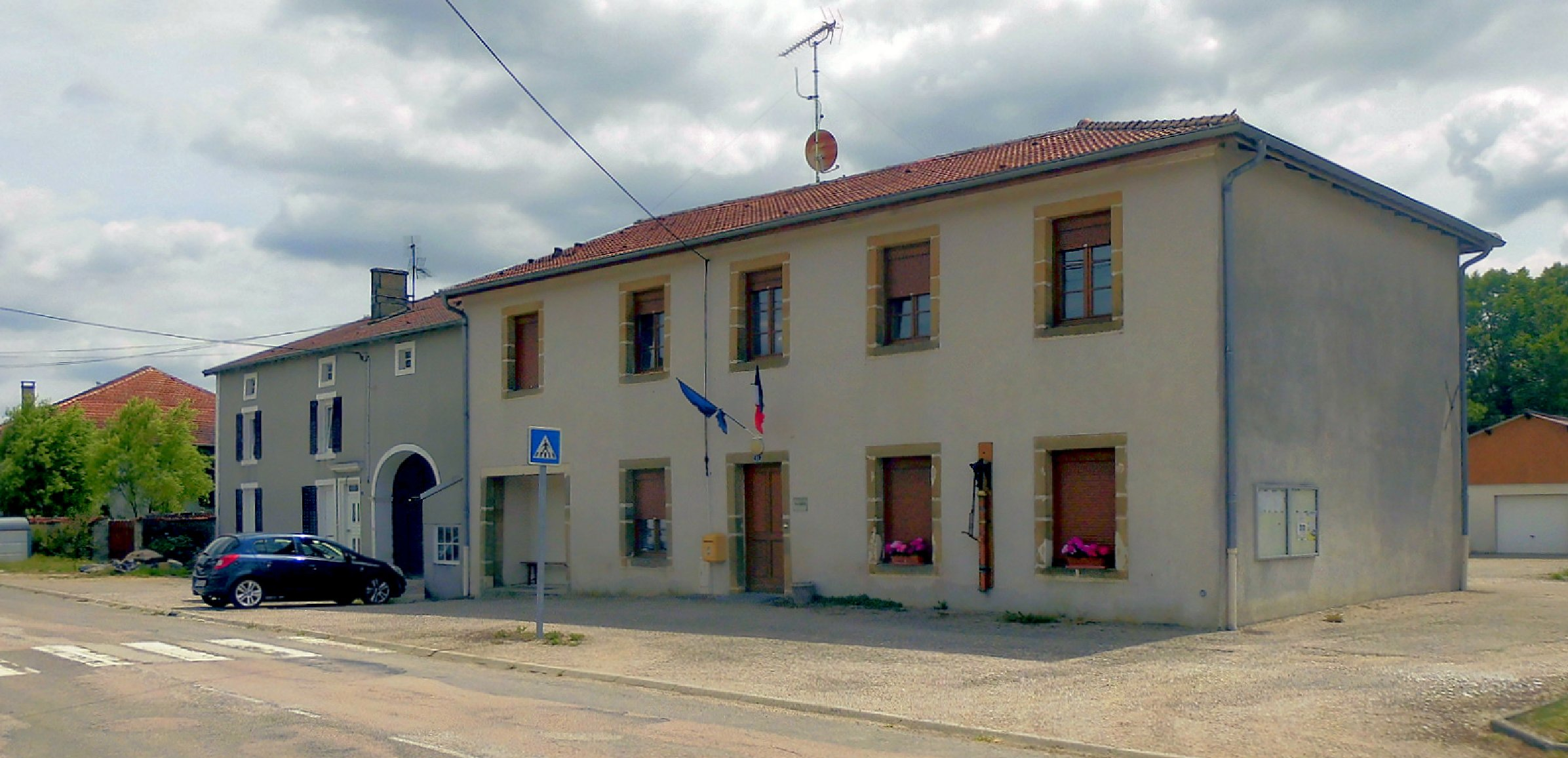
- The town hall in Malaincourt
- Location of Malaincourt
- Location within France Location within Grand Est
- Coordinates: 48°13′14″N 5°45′48″E
- Country: France
- Region: Grand Est
- Department: Vosges
- Arrondissement: Neufchâteau
- Canton: Vittel
- Intercommunality: CC Terre d'eau

Government
  - Mayor (2020–2026): Daniel Depernet
- Area^{1}: 6.05 km^{2} (2.34 sq mi)
- Elevation: 334 m (1,096 ft)
- Highest elevation: 491 m (1,611 ft)
- Lowest elevation: 318 m (1,043 ft)
- Population (2023): 80
  - Density: 13/km^{2} (34/sq mi)
- Time zone: UTC+01:00 (CET)
  - Summer (DST): UTC+02:00 (CEST)
- INSEE/Postal code: 88283 /88140
- ^{1} French Land Register data, which excludes lakes, ponds, glaciers > 1 km^{2} (0.386 sq mi or 247 acres) and river estuaries.

Malaincourt (French pronunciation: [malɛ̃kuʁ]) is a commune in the Vosges department in Grand Est in northeastern France.

== See also ==
- Communes of the Vosges department
