= Morville, Vosges =

Morville
- Commune
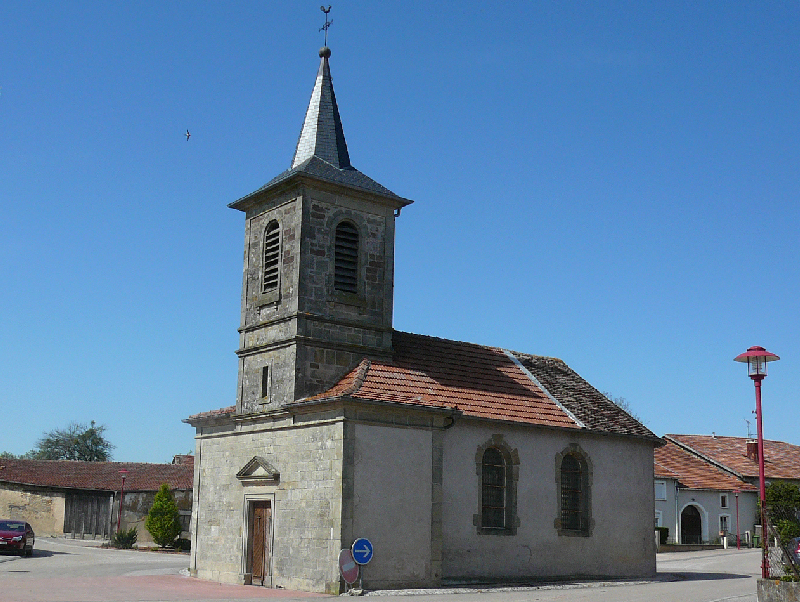
- The church in Morville
- Location of Morville
- Location within France Location within Grand Est
- Coordinates: 48°14′13″N 5°48′03″E
- Country: France
- Region: Grand Est
- Department: Vosges
- Arrondissement: Neufchâteau
- Canton: Vittel
- Intercommunality: CC Terre d'eau

Government
  - Mayor (2020–2026): Michel Voiriot
- Area^{1}: 3.41 km^{2} (1.32 sq mi)
- Highest elevation: 416 m (1,365 ft)
- Lowest elevation: 339 m (1,112 ft)
- Population (2023): 42
  - Density: 12/km^{2} (32/sq mi)
- Time zone: UTC+01:00 (CET)
  - Summer (DST): UTC+02:00 (CEST)
- INSEE/Postal code: 88316 /88140
- ^{1} French Land Register data, which excludes lakes, ponds, glaciers > 1 km^{2} (0.386 sq mi or 247 acres) and river estuaries.

Morville (French pronunciation: [mɔʁvil]) is a commune in the Vosges department in Grand Est in northeastern France.

== See also ==
- Communes of the Vosges department
