= Auzainvilliers =

- Commune
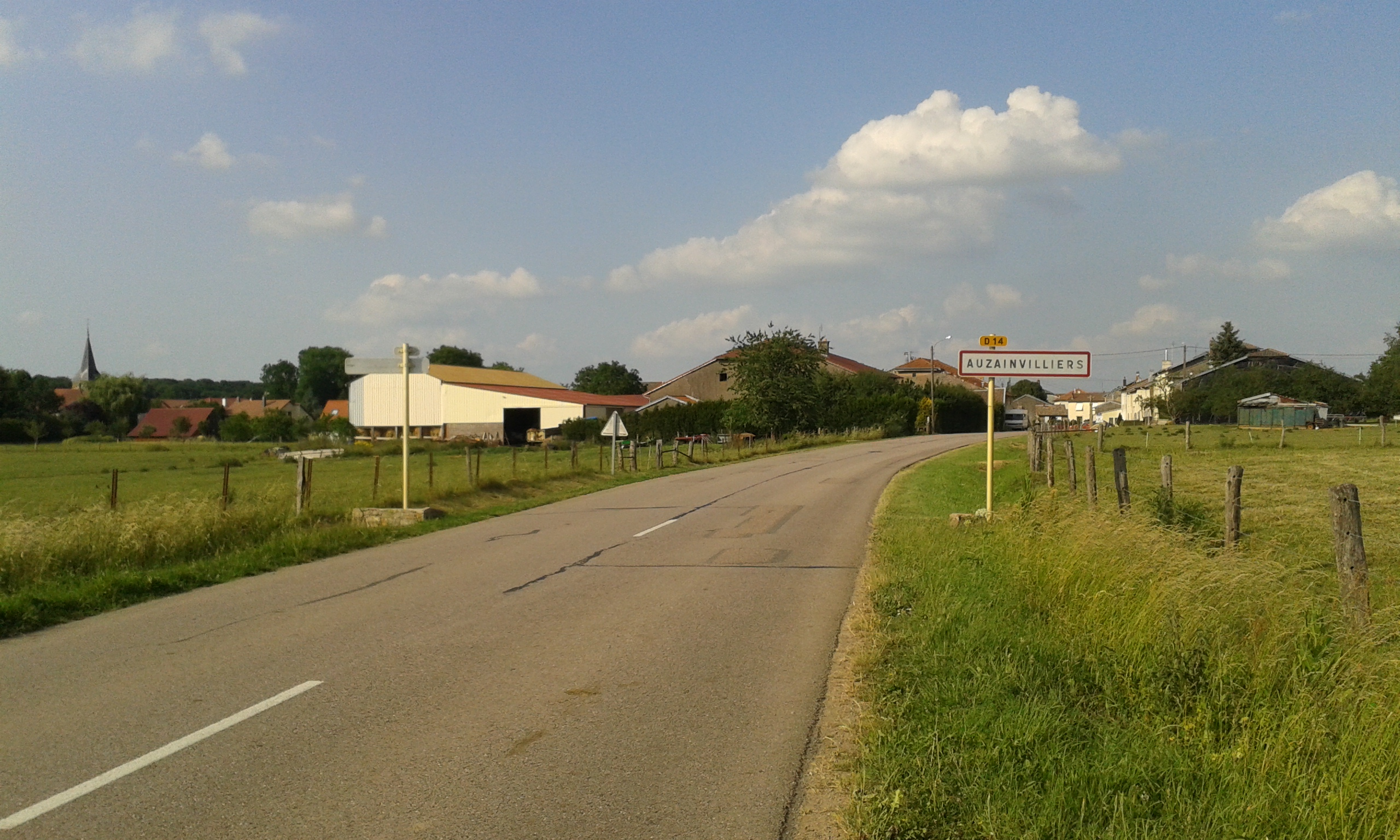
- The road into Auzainvilliers

- Coat of arms
- Location of Auzainvilliers
- Location within France Location within Grand Est
- Coordinates: 48°14′17″N 5°50′29″E
- Country: France
- Region: Grand Est
- Department: Vosges
- Arrondissement: Neufchâteau
- Canton: Vittel
- Intercommunality: CC Terre d'Eau

Government
  - Mayor (2020–2026): Jean-Bernard Mangin
- Area^{1}: 8.25 km^{2} (3.19 sq mi)
- Elevation: 340 m (1,120 ft)
- Highest elevation: 405 m (1,329 ft)
- Lowest elevation: 322 m (1,056 ft)
- Population (2023): 191
  - Density: 23.2/km^{2} (60.0/sq mi)
- Time zone: UTC+01:00 (CET)
  - Summer (DST): UTC+02:00 (CEST)
- INSEE/Postal code: 88022 /88140
- ^{1} French Land Register data, which excludes lakes, ponds, glaciers > 1 km^{2} (0.386 sq mi or 247 acres) and river estuaries.

Auzainvilliers (French pronunciation: [ozɛ̃vilje]) is a commune in the Vosges department in Grand Est in northeastern France.

== See also ==
- Communes of the Vosges department
