= Gendreville =

- Commune
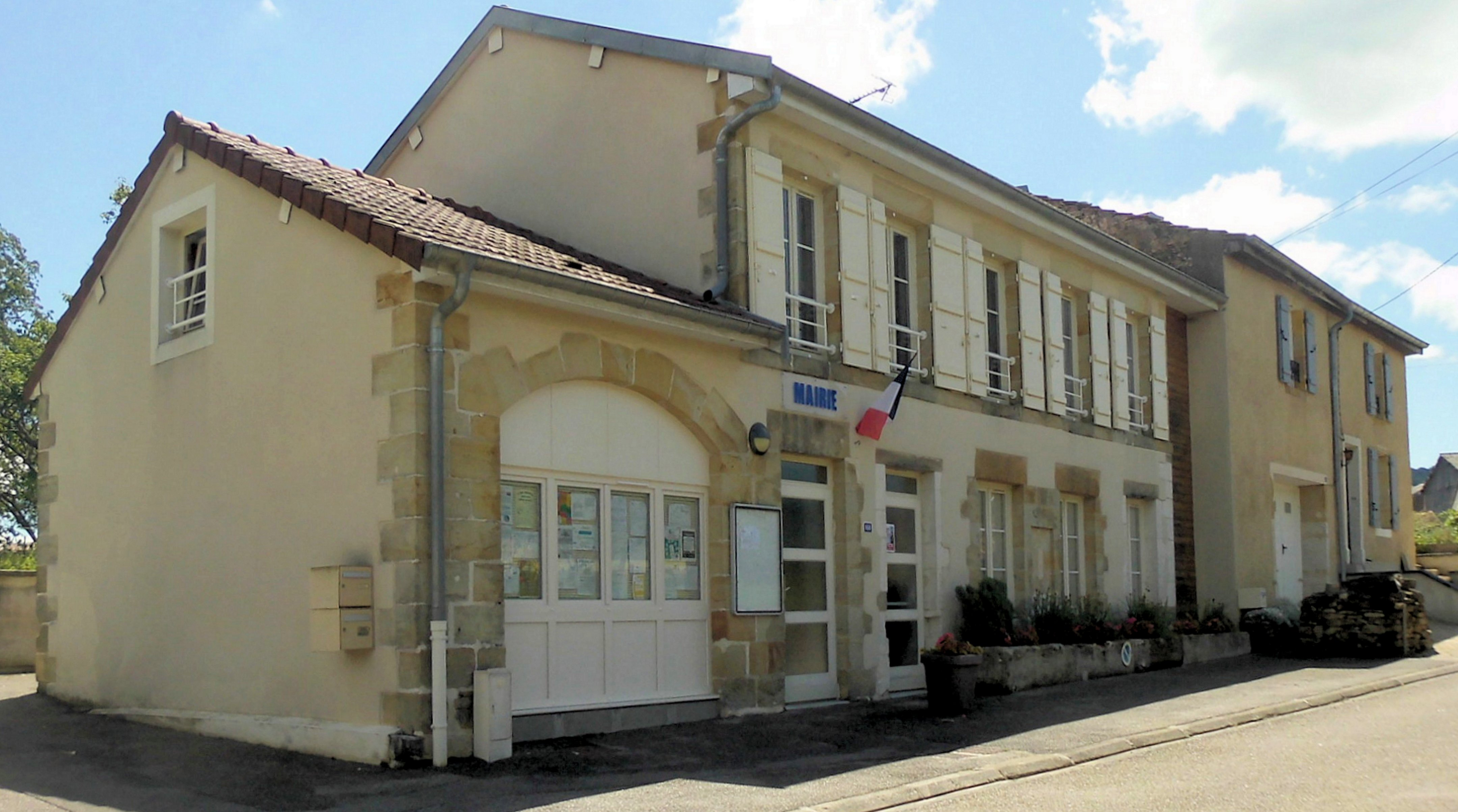
- Gendreville Town hall
- Location of Gendreville
- Location within France Location within Grand Est
- Coordinates: 48°14′08″N 5°43′04″E
- Country: France
- Region: Grand Est
- Department: Vosges
- Arrondissement: Neufchâteau
- Canton: Vittel
- Intercommunality: CC Terre d'eau

Government
  - Mayor (2020–2026): Alain René Martin
- Area^{1}: 8.08 km^{2} (3.12 sq mi)
- Highest elevation: 480 m (1,570 ft)
- Lowest elevation: 312 m (1,024 ft)
- Population (2023): 103
  - Density: 12.7/km^{2} (33.0/sq mi)
- Time zone: UTC+01:00 (CET)
  - Summer (DST): UTC+02:00 (CEST)
- INSEE/Postal code: 88195 /88140
- ^{1} French Land Register data, which excludes lakes, ponds, glaciers > 1 km^{2} (0.386 sq mi or 247 acres) and river estuaries.

Gendreville (French pronunciation: [ʒɑ̃dʁəvil]) is a commune in the Vosges department in Grand Est in northeastern France.

== See also ==
- Communes of the Vosges department
