= Belmont-sur-Vair =

- Commune
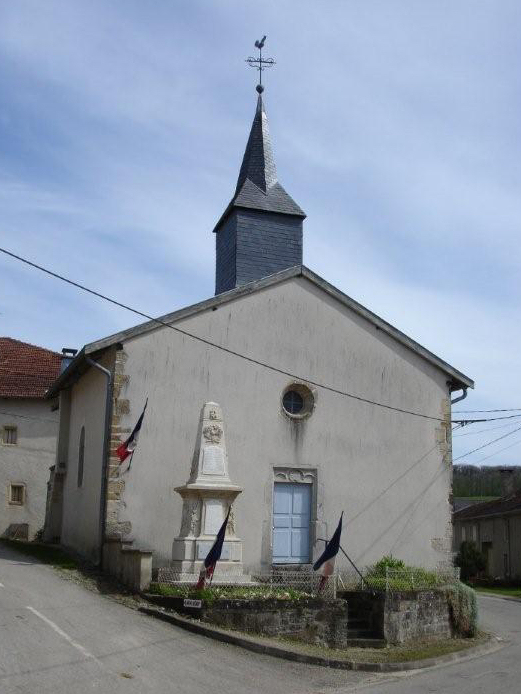
- The church in Belmont-sur-Vair

- Coat of arms
- Location of Belmont-sur-Vair
- Location within France Location within Grand Est
- Coordinates: 48°15′20″N 5°54′29″E
- Country: France
- Region: Grand Est
- Department: Vosges
- Arrondissement: Neufchâteau
- Canton: Vittel
- Intercommunality: CC Terre d'eau

Government
  - Mayor (2021–2026): Nicolas Charnot
- Area^{1}: 6.17 km^{2} (2.38 sq mi)
- Elevation: 360 m (1,180 ft)
- Highest elevation: 429 m (1,407 ft)
- Lowest elevation: 317 m (1,040 ft)
- Population (2023): 123
  - Density: 19.9/km^{2} (51.6/sq mi)
- Time zone: UTC+01:00 (CET)
  - Summer (DST): UTC+02:00 (CEST)
- INSEE/Postal code: 88051 /88800
- ^{1} French Land Register data, which excludes lakes, ponds, glaciers > 1 km^{2} (0.386 sq mi or 247 acres) and river estuaries.

Belmont-sur-Vair (French pronunciation: [bɛlmɔ̃ syʁ vɛʁ], literally Belmont on Vair) is a commune in the Vosges department in Grand Est in northeastern France.

== See also ==
- Communes of the Vosges department
