= Aingeville =

- Commune
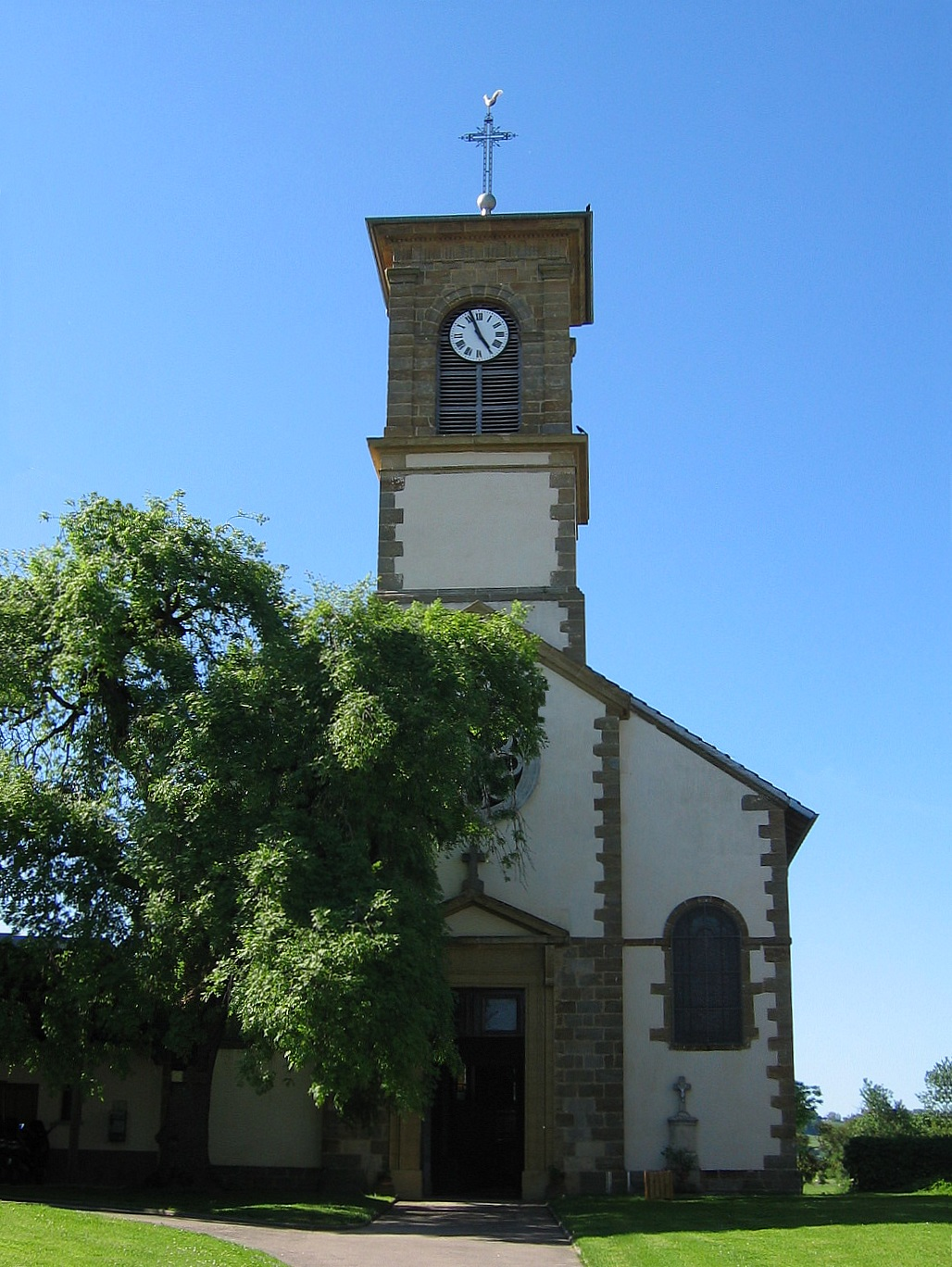
- The church in Aingeville
- Location of Aingeville
- Location within France Location within Grand Est
- Coordinates: 48°12′27″N 5°46′15″E
- Country: France
- Region: Grand Est
- Department: Vosges
- Arrondissement: Neufchâteau
- Canton: Vittel
- Intercommunality: Terre d'Eau

Government
  - Mayor (2020–2026): Michel Larche
- Area^{1}: 5.77 km^{2} (2.23 sq mi)
- Elevation: 330 m (1,080 ft)
- Highest elevation: 349 m (1,145 ft)
- Lowest elevation: 318 m (1,043 ft)
- Population (2023): 60
  - Density: 10/km^{2} (27/sq mi)
- Time zone: UTC+01:00 (CET)
  - Summer (DST): UTC+02:00 (CEST)
- INSEE/Postal code: 88003 /88140
- ^{1} French Land Register data, which excludes lakes, ponds, glaciers > 1 km^{2} (0.386 sq mi or 247 acres) and river estuaries.

Aingeville (French pronunciation: [ɛ̃ʒvil]) is a commune in the Vosges department in Grand Est in northeastern France. The village was built on the left bank of the river Anger, a tributary of the Mouzon and sub-tributary of the Meuse.

== Population ==
Historical population
Year	Pop.	±% p.a.
1968	83	—
1975	80	−0.52%
1982	73	−1.30%
1990	67	−1.07%
1999	68	+0.16%
2007	65	−0.56%
2012	77	+3.45%
2017	61	−4.55%
2023	60	−0.28%
Source: INSEE

== See also ==
- Communes of the Vosges department
