= Dombrot-sur-Vair =

- Commune
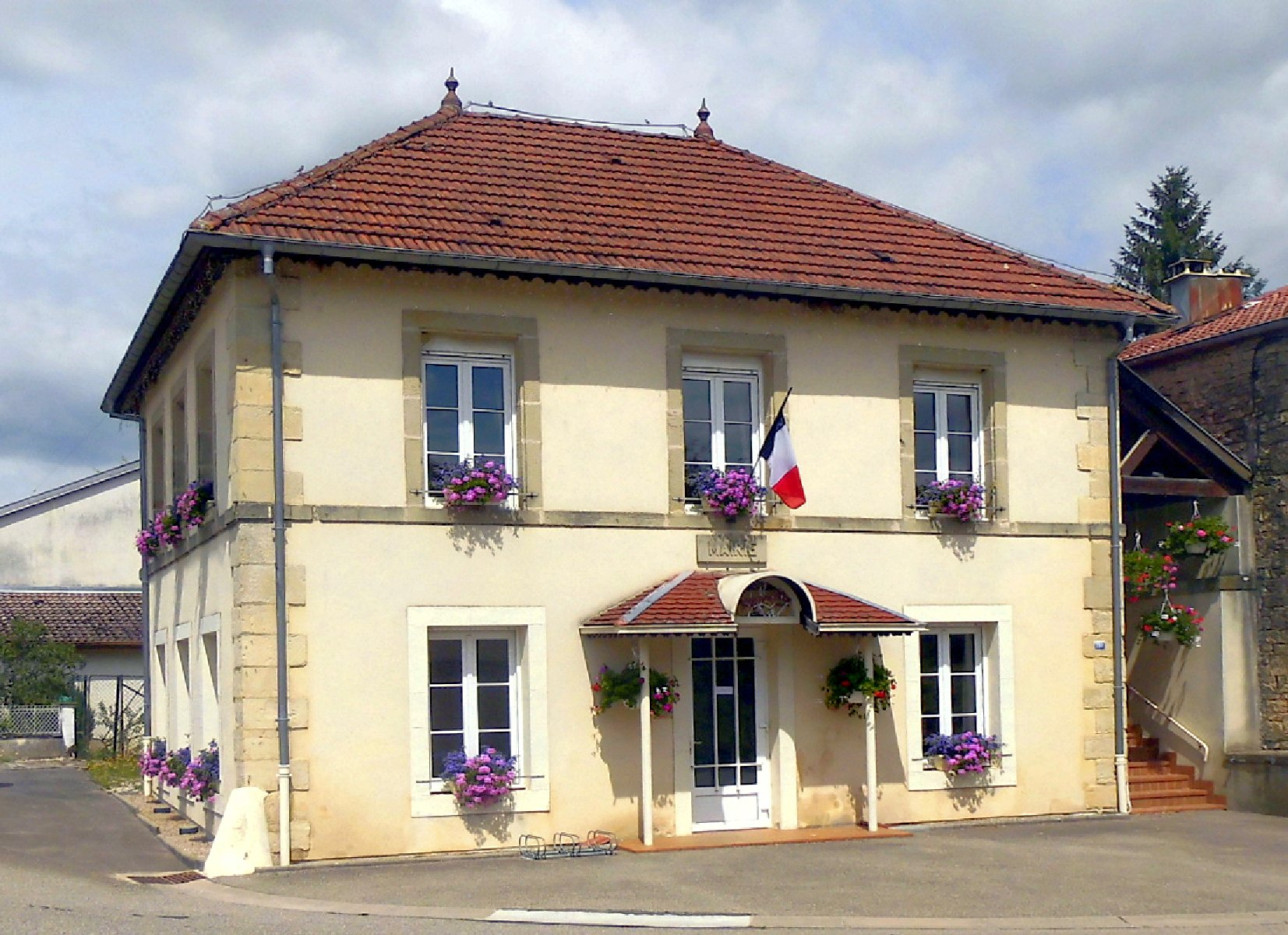
- The town hall in Dombrot-sur-Vair

- Coat of arms
- Location of Dombrot-sur-Vair
- Location within France Location within Grand Est
- Coordinates: 48°15′56″N 5°53′20″E
- Country: France
- Region: Grand Est
- Department: Vosges
- Arrondissement: Neufchâteau
- Canton: Vittel
- Intercommunality: CC Terre d'eau

Government
  - Mayor (2020–2026): Christophe Vouillon
- Area^{1}: 9.04 km^{2} (3.49 sq mi)
- Elevation: 360 m (1,180 ft)
- Highest elevation: 399 m (1,309 ft)
- Lowest elevation: 310 m (1,020 ft)
- Population (2023): 239
  - Density: 26.4/km^{2} (68.5/sq mi)
- Time zone: UTC+01:00 (CET)
  - Summer (DST): UTC+02:00 (CEST)
- INSEE/Postal code: 88141 /88170
- ^{1} French Land Register data, which excludes lakes, ponds, glaciers > 1 km^{2} (0.386 sq mi or 247 acres) and river estuaries.

Dombrot-sur-Vair (French pronunciation: [dɔ̃bʁo syʁ vɛʁ], literally Dombrot on Vair) is a commune in the Vosges department in Grand Est in northeastern France.

== See also ==
- Communes of the Vosges department
