= Canton of Vittel =

Coordinates: 48°12′5″N 5°55′13″E

Vittel
- Canton
- Country: France
- Region: Grand Est
- Department: Vosges
- No. of communes: {{{nbcomm}}}
- Area: 422.50 km^{2} (163.13 sq mi)
- Population (2023): 16,979
  - Density: 40.187/km^{2} (104.08/sq mi)
- INSEE code: 88 17

The Canton of Vittel is a French administrative and electoral grouping of communes in the Vosges département of eastern France and in the region of Grand Est. The Canton of Vittel has its administrative centre at Vittel.

== Composition ==
At the French canton reorganisation which came into effect in March 2015, the canton was expanded from 21 to 45 communes:

- Aingeville
- Aulnois
- Auzainvilliers
- Bazoilles-et-Ménil
- Belmont-sur-Vair
- Bulgnéville
- Contrexéville
- Crainvilliers
- Dombrot-le-Sec
- Dombrot-sur-Vair
- Domèvre-sous-Montfort
- Domjulien
- Estrennes
- Gemmelaincourt
- Gendreville
- Hagnéville-et-Roncourt
- Haréville
- Lignéville
- Malaincourt
- Mandres-sur-Vair
- Médonville
- Monthureux-le-Sec
- Morville
- La Neuveville-sous-Montfort
- Norroy
- Offroicourt
- Parey-sous-Montfort
- Rancourt
- Remoncourt
- Rozerotte
- Saint-Ouen-lès-Parey
- Saint-Remimont
- Saulxures-lès-Bulgnéville
- Sauville
- Suriauville
- They-sous-Montfort
- Thuillières
- Urville
- La Vacheresse-et-la-Rouillie
- Valfroicourt
- Valleroy-le-Sec
- Vaudoncourt
- Vittel
- Viviers-lès-Offroicourt
- Vrécourt
