= Parey-sous-Montfort =

- Commune
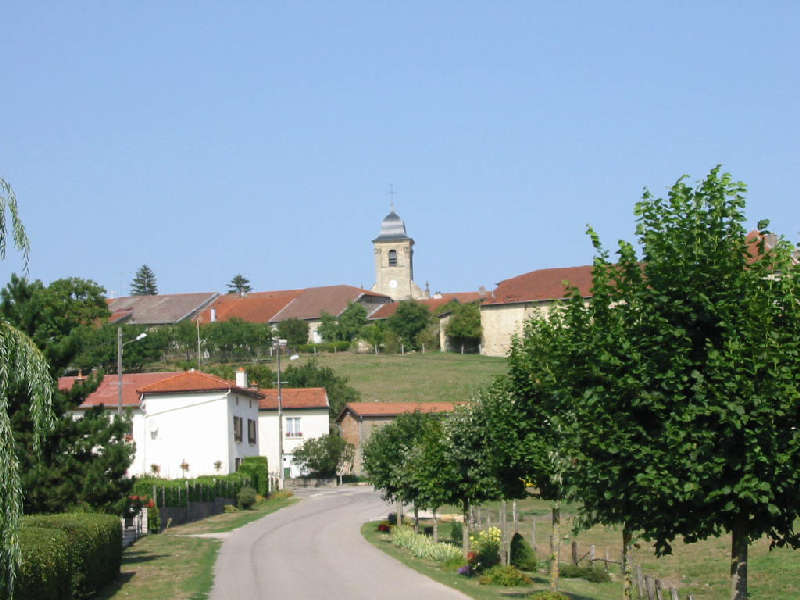
- A general view of Parey-sous-Montfort
- Location of Parey-sous-Montfort
- Location within France Location within Grand Est
- Coordinates: 48°15′07″N 5°56′38″E
- Country: France
- Region: Grand Est
- Department: Vosges
- Arrondissement: Neufchâteau
- Canton: Vittel
- Intercommunality: CC Terre d'eau

Government
  - Mayor (2020–2026): Sullyvan Gerard
- Area^{1}: 7.04 km^{2} (2.72 sq mi)
- Elevation: 400 m (1,300 ft)
- Highest elevation: 431 m (1,414 ft)
- Lowest elevation: 327 m (1,073 ft)
- Population (2023): 164
  - Density: 23.3/km^{2} (60.3/sq mi)
- Time zone: UTC+01:00 (CET)
  - Summer (DST): UTC+02:00 (CEST)
- INSEE/Postal code: 88343 /88800
- ^{1} French Land Register data, which excludes lakes, ponds, glaciers > 1 km^{2} (0.386 sq mi or 247 acres) and river estuaries.

Parey-sous-Montfort (French pronunciation: [paʁɛ su mɔ̃fɔʁ]) is a commune in the Vosges department in Grand Est in northeastern France.

== See also ==
- Communes of the Vosges department
