= Sauville, Vosges =

Sauville
- Commune
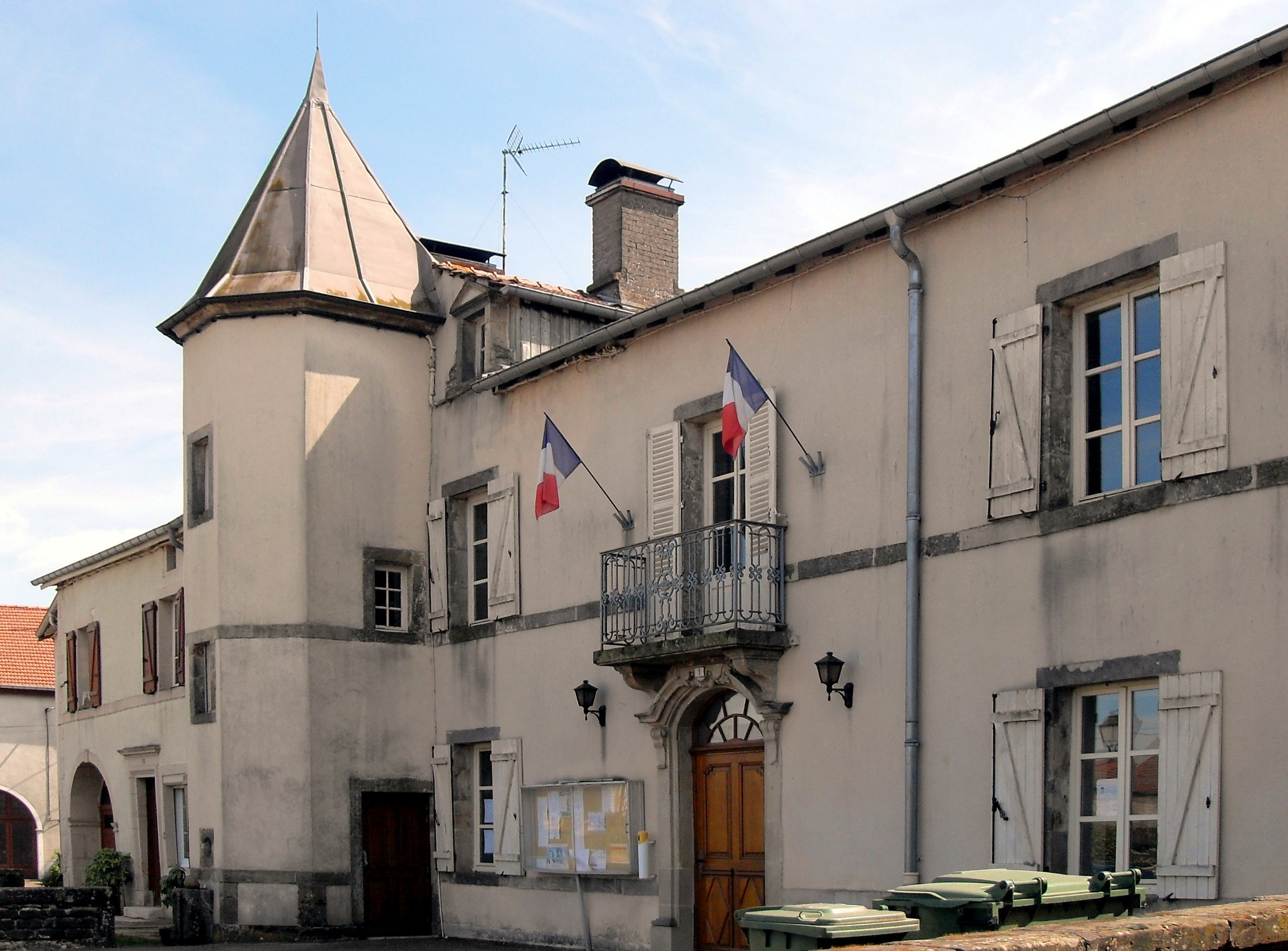
- The town hall in Sauville
- Location of Sauville
- Location within France Location within Grand Est
- Coordinates: 48°09′44″N 5°44′02″E
- Country: France
- Region: Grand Est
- Department: Vosges
- Arrondissement: Neufchâteau
- Canton: Vittel
- Intercommunality: CC Terre d'eau

Government
  - Mayor (2020–2026): Marc Grujard
- Area^{1}: 14.38 km^{2} (5.55 sq mi)
- Elevation: 360 m (1,180 ft)
- Highest elevation: 428 m (1,404 ft)
- Lowest elevation: 325 m (1,066 ft)
- Population (2023): 168
  - Density: 11.7/km^{2} (30.3/sq mi)
- Time zone: UTC+01:00 (CET)
  - Summer (DST): UTC+02:00 (CEST)
- INSEE/Postal code: 88448 /88140
- ^{1} French Land Register data, which excludes lakes, ponds, glaciers > 1 km^{2} (0.386 sq mi or 247 acres) and river estuaries.

Sauville (French pronunciation: [sovil]) is a commune in the Vosges department in Grand Est in northeastern France.

== See also ==
- Communes of the Vosges department
