= Hagnéville-et-Roncourt =

- Commune
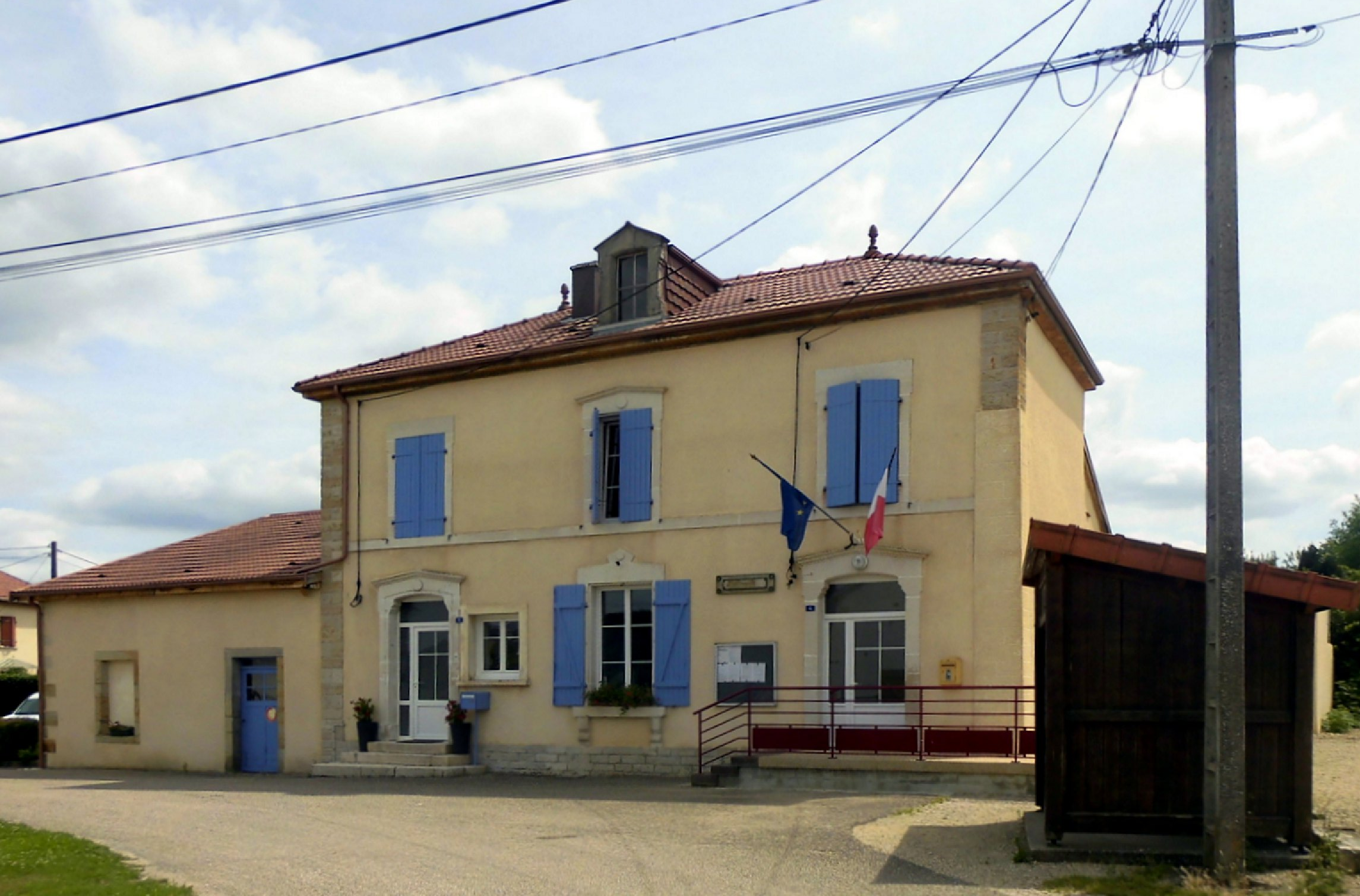
- The town hall in Hagnéville-et-Roncourt
- Location of Hagnéville-et-Roncourt
- Location within France Location within Grand Est
- Coordinates: 48°15′15″N 5°47′57″E
- Country: France
- Region: Grand Est
- Department: Vosges
- Arrondissement: Neufchâteau
- Canton: Vittel
- Intercommunality: CC Terre d'eau

Government
  - Mayor (2020–2026): Katia Voirin
- Area^{1}: 8.55 km^{2} (3.30 sq mi)
- Highest elevation: 487 m (1,598 ft)
- Lowest elevation: 340 m (1,120 ft)
- Population (2023): 78
  - Density: 9.1/km^{2} (24/sq mi)
- Time zone: UTC+01:00 (CET)
  - Summer (DST): UTC+02:00 (CEST)
- INSEE/Postal code: 88227 /88300
- ^{1} French Land Register data, which excludes lakes, ponds, glaciers > 1 km^{2} (0.386 sq mi or 247 acres) and river estuaries.

Hagnéville-et-Roncourt (French pronunciation: [aɲevil e ʁɔ̃kuʁ]) is a commune in the Vosges department in Grand Est in northeastern France.

== See also ==
- Communes of the Vosges department
