= Saulxures-lès-Bulgnéville =

- Commune
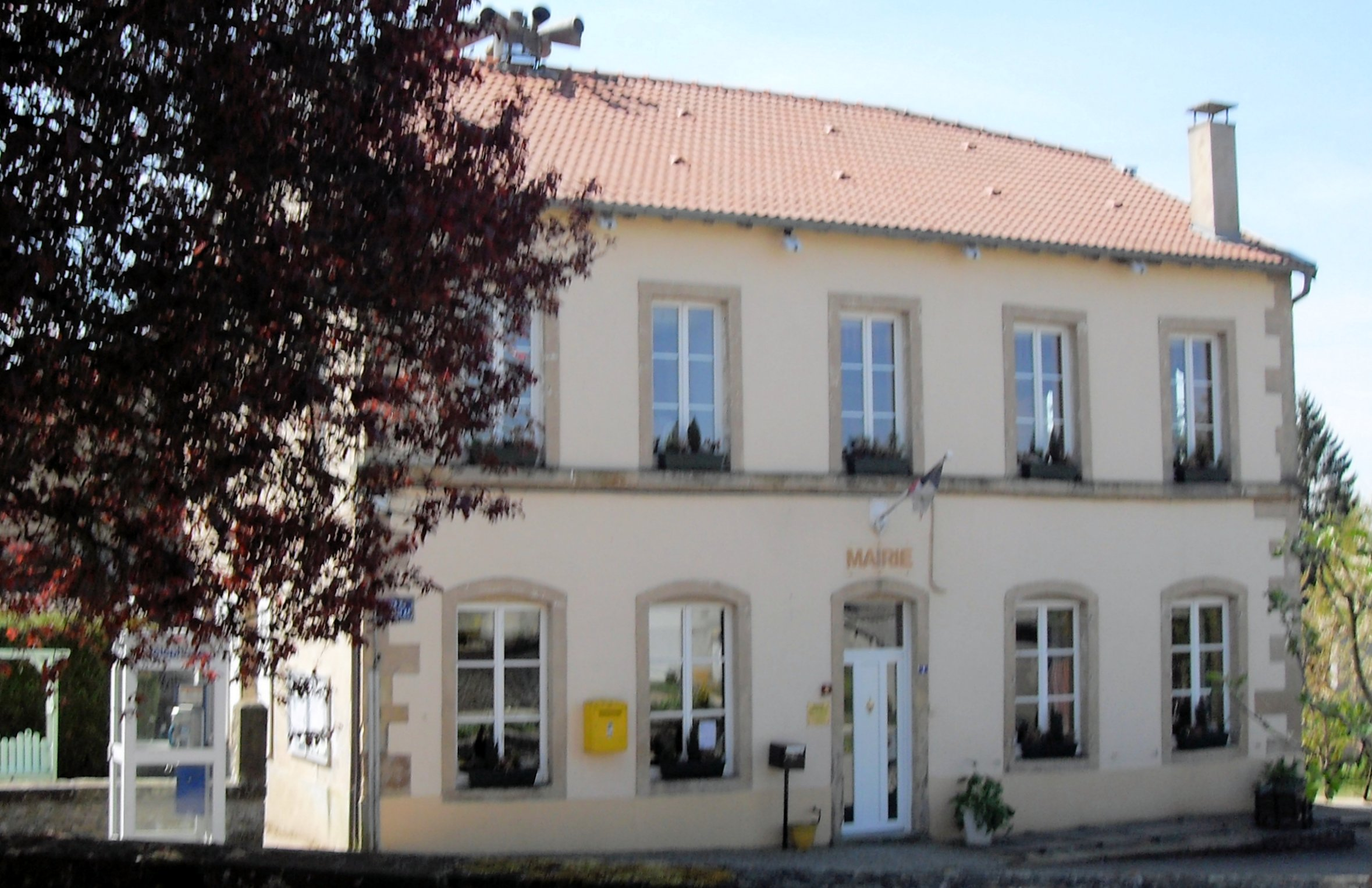
- The town hall in Saulxures-lès-Bulgnéville

- Coat of arms
- Location of Saulxures-lès-Bulgnéville
- Location within France Location within Grand Est
- Coordinates: 48°11′52″N 5°48′28″E
- Country: France
- Region: Grand Est
- Department: Vosges
- Arrondissement: Neufchâteau
- Canton: Vittel
- Intercommunality: CC Terre d'eau

Government
  - Mayor (2020–2026): Sylvain Gloriot
- Area^{1}: 9.54 km^{2} (3.68 sq mi)
- Elevation: 380 m (1,250 ft)
- Highest elevation: 451 m (1,480 ft)
- Lowest elevation: 322 m (1,056 ft)
- Population (2023): 227
  - Density: 23.8/km^{2} (61.6/sq mi)
- Time zone: UTC+01:00 (CET)
  - Summer (DST): UTC+02:00 (CEST)
- INSEE/Postal code: 88446 /88140
- ^{1} French Land Register data, which excludes lakes, ponds, glaciers > 1 km^{2} (0.386 sq mi or 247 acres) and river estuaries.

Saulxures-lès-Bulgnéville (French pronunciation: [solsyʁ lɛ bylɲevil], literally Saulxures near Bulgnéville) is a commune in the Vosges department in Grand Est in northeastern France.

== See also ==
- Communes of the Vosges department
