= Urville, Vosges =

Urville
- Commune
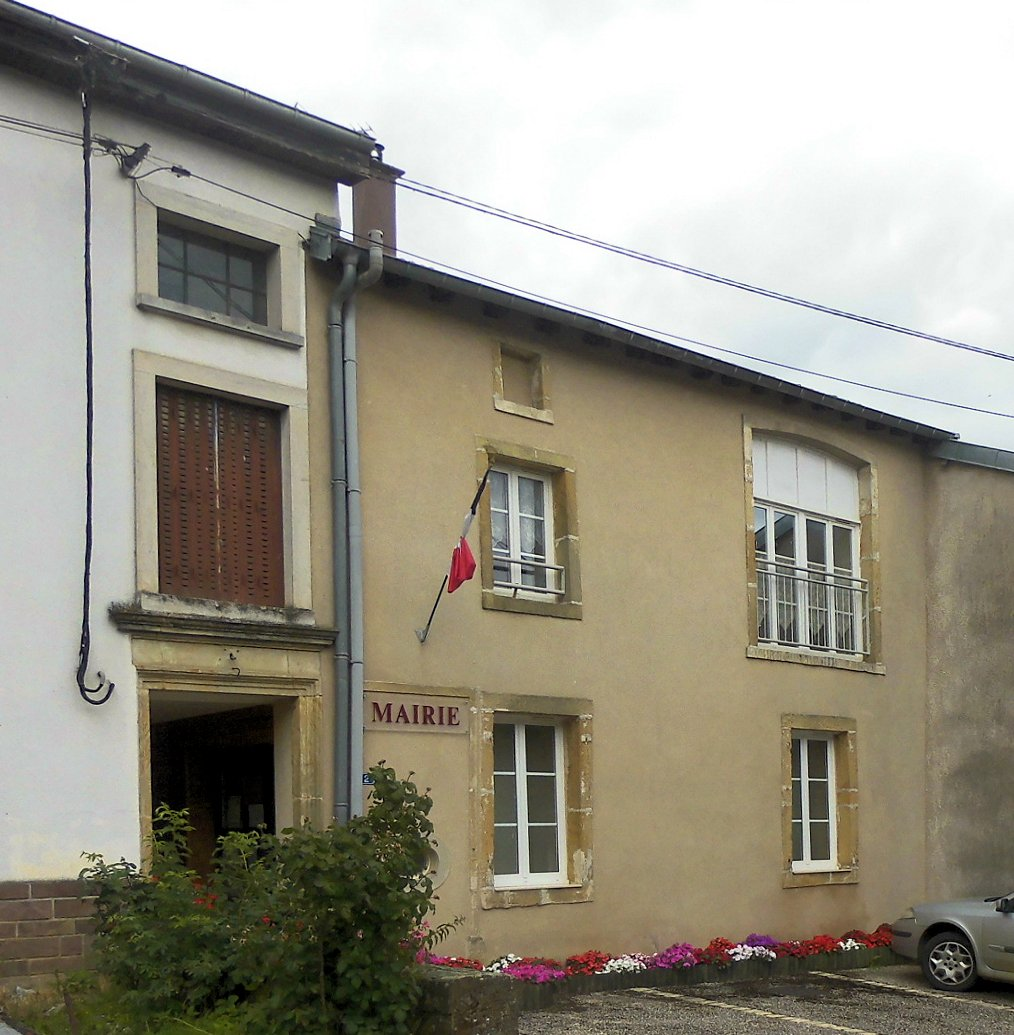
- The town hall in Urville
- Location of Urville
- Location within France Location within Grand Est
- Coordinates: 48°11′17″N 5°44′51″E
- Country: France
- Region: Grand Est
- Department: Vosges
- Arrondissement: Neufchâteau
- Canton: Vittel
- Intercommunality: CC Terre d'eau

Government
  - Mayor (2020–2026): Denis Crémel
- Area^{1}: 4.02 km^{2} (1.55 sq mi)
- Elevation: 336 m (1,102 ft)
- Highest elevation: 429 m (1,407 ft)
- Lowest elevation: 327 m (1,073 ft)
- Population (2023): 54
  - Density: 13/km^{2} (35/sq mi)
- Time zone: UTC+01:00 (CET)
  - Summer (DST): UTC+02:00 (CEST)
- INSEE/Postal code: 88482 /88140
- ^{1} French Land Register data, which excludes lakes, ponds, glaciers > 1 km^{2} (0.386 sq mi or 247 acres) and river estuaries.

Urville (French pronunciation: [yʁvil]) is a commune in the Vosges department in Grand Est in northeastern France.

== See also ==
- Communes of the Vosges department
