= Vrécourt =

- Commune
- Location of Vrécourt
- Location within France Location within Grand Est
- Coordinates: 48°10′31″N 5°42′15″E
- Country: France
- Region: Grand Est
- Department: Vosges
- Arrondissement: Neufchâteau
- Canton: Vittel
- Intercommunality: Terre d'eau

Government
  - Mayor (2020–2026): Eric Valtot
- Area^{1}: 12.46 km^{2} (4.81 sq mi)
- Elevation: 342 m (1,122 ft)
- Highest elevation: 385 m (1,263 ft)
- Lowest elevation: 317 m (1,040 ft)
- Population (2023): 341
  - Density: 27.4/km^{2} (70.9/sq mi)
- Time zone: UTC+01:00 (CET)
  - Summer (DST): UTC+02:00 (CEST)
- INSEE/Postal code: 88524 /88140
- ^{1} French Land Register data, which excludes lakes, ponds, glaciers > 1 km^{2} (0.386 sq mi or 247 acres) and river estuaries.

Vrécourt (French pronunciation: [vʁekuʁ]) is a commune in the Vosges department in Grand Est in northeastern France.

== See also ==
- Communes of the Vosges department
