= Aulnois, Vosges =

Aulnois
- Commune
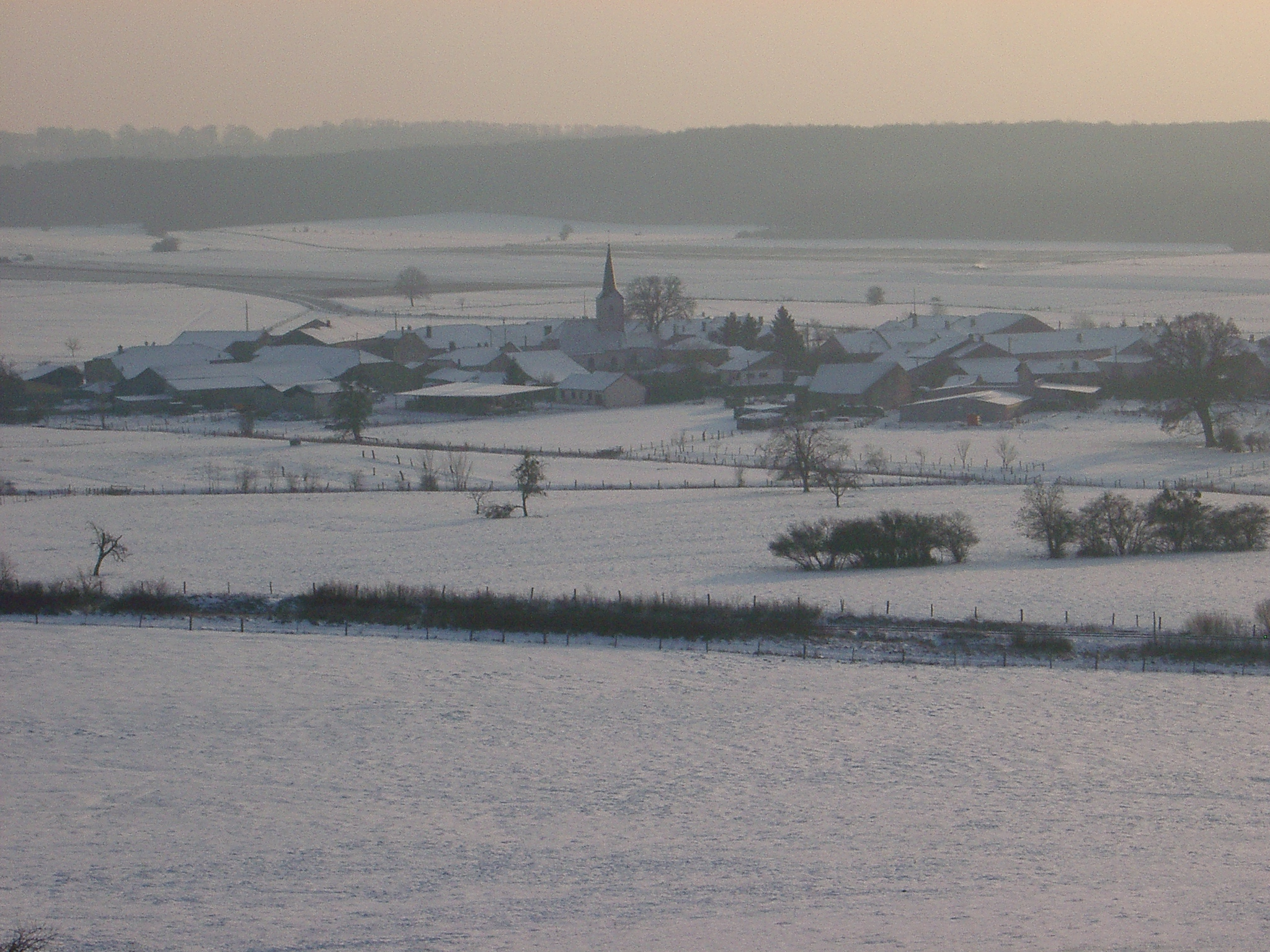
- A general view of Aulnois in winter

- Coat of arms
- Location of Aulnois
- Location within France Location within Grand Est
- Coordinates: 48°15′29″N 5°47′05″E
- Country: France
- Region: Grand Est
- Department: Vosges
- Arrondissement: Neufchâteau
- Canton: Vittel
- Intercommunality: CC Terre Eau

Government
  - Mayor (2020–2026): Alain Mougenel
- Area^{1}: 4.44 km^{2} (1.71 sq mi)
- Elevation: 337 m (1,106 ft)
- Highest elevation: 430 m (1,410 ft)
- Lowest elevation: 328 m (1,076 ft)
- Population (2023): 159
  - Density: 35.8/km^{2} (92.7/sq mi)
- Time zone: UTC+01:00 (CET)
  - Summer (DST): UTC+02:00 (CEST)
- INSEE/Postal code: 88017 /88300
- ^{1} French Land Register data, which excludes lakes, ponds, glaciers > 1 km^{2} (0.386 sq mi or 247 acres) and river estuaries.

Aulnois (French pronunciation: [onwa]) is a commune in the Vosges department in Grand Est in northeastern France.

== See also ==
- Communes of the Vosges department
