= Association of Saône Vosgienne country communes =

The Association of Saône Vosgienne country communes (French: Communauté de communes du Pays de la Saône Vosgienne) is a former administrative association of rural communes in the Vosges département of eastern France and in the region of Lorraine. It was merged into the new Communauté de communes les Vosges côté Sud-Ouest in January 2017.

Created in 2004, the association had its administrative offices at Monthureux-sur-Saône.

== Composition ==
The Communauté de communes comprised the following communes:

- Ameuvelle
- Bleurville
- Châtillon-sur-Saône
- Claudon
- Dombrot-le-Sec
- Fignévelle
- Gignéville
- Godoncourt
- Grignoncourt
- Lignéville
- Lironcourt
- Martinvelle
- Monthureux-sur-Saône
- Nonville
- Regnévelle
- Saint-Julien
- Les Thons
- Tignécourt
- Viviers-le-Gras
