= Association of Saône and Madon Country communes =

The Association of Saône and Madon Country communes (French: Communauté de communes du Pays de Saône et Madon) is a former administrative association of rural communes in the Vosges département of eastern France and in the region of Lorraine. It was created in 1992 and had its administrative offices at Darney. It was merged into the new Communauté de communes les Vosges côté Sud-Ouest in January 2017. It takes its name from the rivers Saône and Madon.

== Composition ==
The Communauté de communes comprised the following communes:

- Attigny
- Belmont-lès-Darney
- Belrupt
- Bonvillet
- Darney
- Dombasle-devant-Darney
- Dommartin-lès-Vallois
- Escles
- Esley
- Frénois
- Hennezel
- Jésonville
- Lerrain
- Pont-lès-Bonfays
- Provenchères-lès-Darney
- Relanges
- Saint-Baslemont
- Sans-Vallois
- Senonges
- Thuillières
- Les Vallois
- Vioménil
