= Canton of Monthureux-sur-Saône =

Coordinates: 48°1′52″N 5°58′26″E

Monthureux-sur-Saône
- Former canton
- Interactive map of Monthureux-sur-Saône
- Country: France
- Region: Grand Est
- Department: Vosges
- No. of communes: {{{nbcomm}}}
- Disbanded: 2015
- Area: 139.21 km^{2} (53.75 sq mi)
- Population (2012): 2,447
  - Density: 17.58/km^{2} (45.53/sq mi)

The Canton of Monthureux-sur-Saône is a former French administrative and electoral grouping of communes in the Vosges département of eastern France and in the region of Lorraine. It was disbanded following the French canton reorganisation which came into effect in March 2015. It consisted of 11 communes, which joined the canton of Darney in 2015. It had 2,447 inhabitants (2012).

One of 13 cantons in the Arrondissement of Épinal, the Canton of Monthureux-sur-Saône had its administrative centre at Monthureux-sur-Saône.

== Composition ==
The Canton of Monthureux-sur-Saône comprised the following 11 communes:

- Ameuvelle
- Bleurville
- Claudon
- Fignévelle
- Gignéville
- Godoncourt
- Martinvelle
- Monthureux-sur-Saône
- Nonville
- Regnévelle
- Viviers-le-Gras
