= Vallois (disambiguation) =

Vallois is a French commune.

Vallois may also refer to:

- Henri Victor Vallois (1889–1981), French anthropologist and paleontologist
- Philippe Vallois (born 1948), French film director and screenwriter
- Dommartin-lès-Vallois, French commune
- Les Vallois, French commune
- Sans-Vallois, French commune
- Galerie Vallois, French art gallery
