= Hubert Ponscarme =

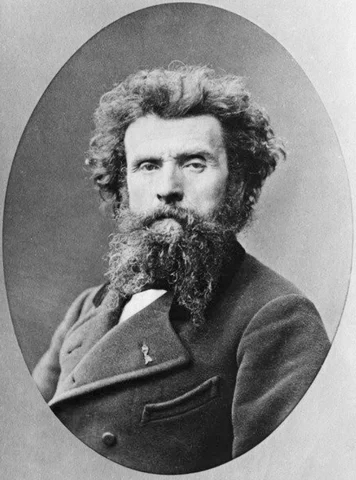
Hubert Ponscarme (c. 1870)

François Joseph Hubert Ponscarme (20 April 1827, Belmont-lès-Darney - 27 February 1903, Malakoff) was a French sculptor and medallist.

== Biography ==
He was the second of twelve children born to a family of farmers. At that time, his father was serving as a school master. While he was still a toddler, his family moved to Nonville. One day, while out plowing, he turned up an ancient medal with an image of the Roman Emperor Caracalla; very well preserved. This apparently inspired him to pursue a career as a medallist.

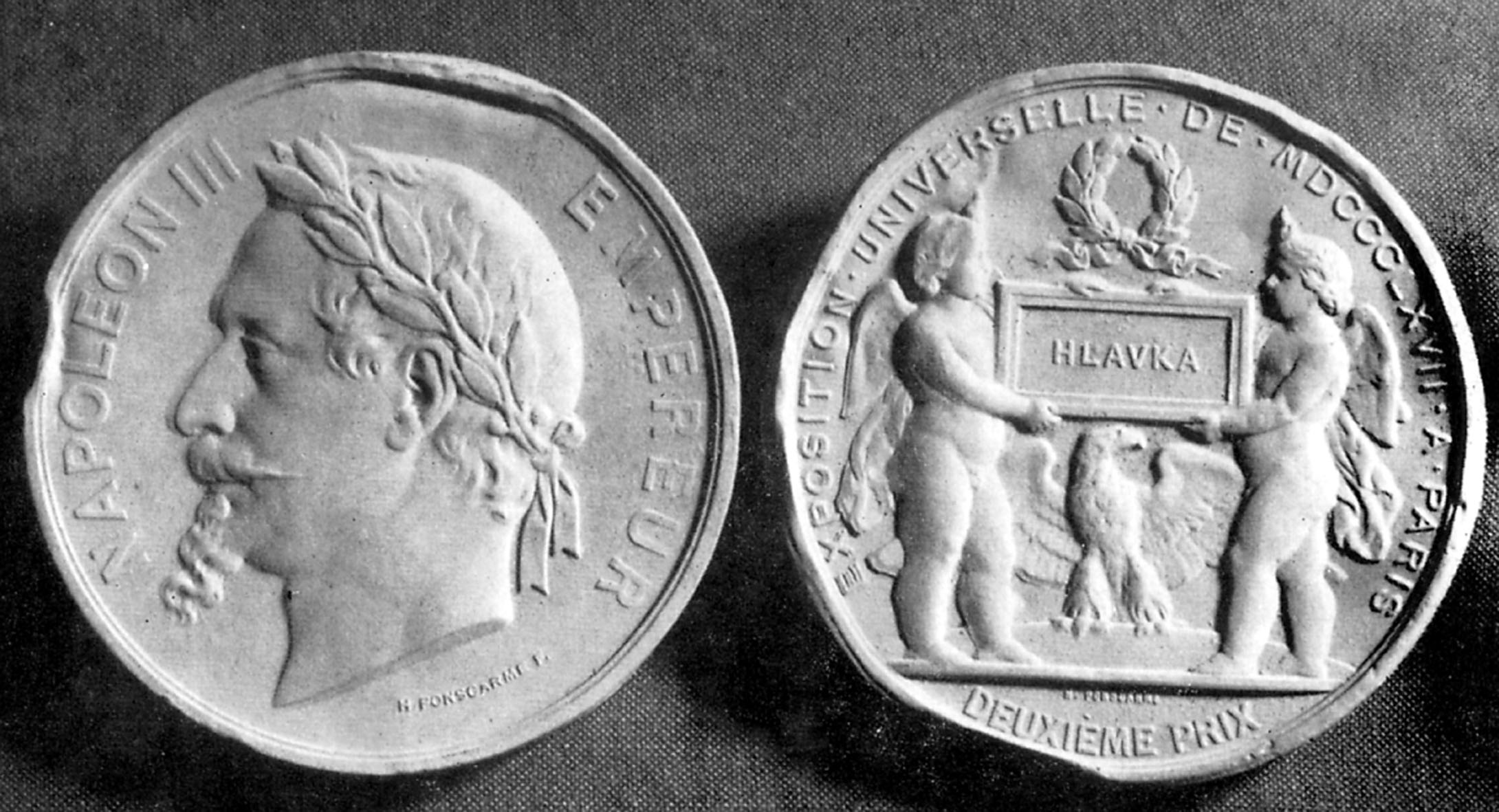
Medal of Napoleon III, presented to the architect, Josef Hlávka, at the Exposition Universelle (1867)

In 1839, he was allowed to take Latin lessons from the parish priest of Attigny. Two years later, he entered the sixth grade at the minor seminary in Senaide. In 1844, he was sent to the full seminary in Châtel-sur-Moselle, but stayed for only a few months. After that, he earned his living by sculpting crosses for the tombs at the local cemetery. A friend of the family, Father Charles Chapiat, provided him with a small sum that would enable him to join his older brother in Paris. There, he sought a position as an apprentice engraver. He also took lessons from Eugène André Oudiné, Louis Merley, and André Vauthier-Galle; noted sculptors and medallists. This was brought to an end when he caught cholera, during the epidemic of 1849, and returned to Nonville to recover.

The Société d'émulation du département des Vosges, a learned society devoted to antiquities, among other interests, provided assistance to the young artist. A scholarship gave him the means to return to Paris in 1854 and take classes at the École des Beaux-Arts. His talents were recognized the following year, when he was awarded second place in the engraving category at the Prix de Rome. In 1857, he received that same honor in the sculpture category.

It was then that he decided to focus on medals, and was named a portrait medallist to Napoleon III. In 1867, medals he designed were awarded at the Exposition Universelle. That same year, he was named a Knight in the Legion of Honor. But these achievements were overshadowed by the death of his wife, Adélaïde, in 1869. They had been married for nine years, and had two children.

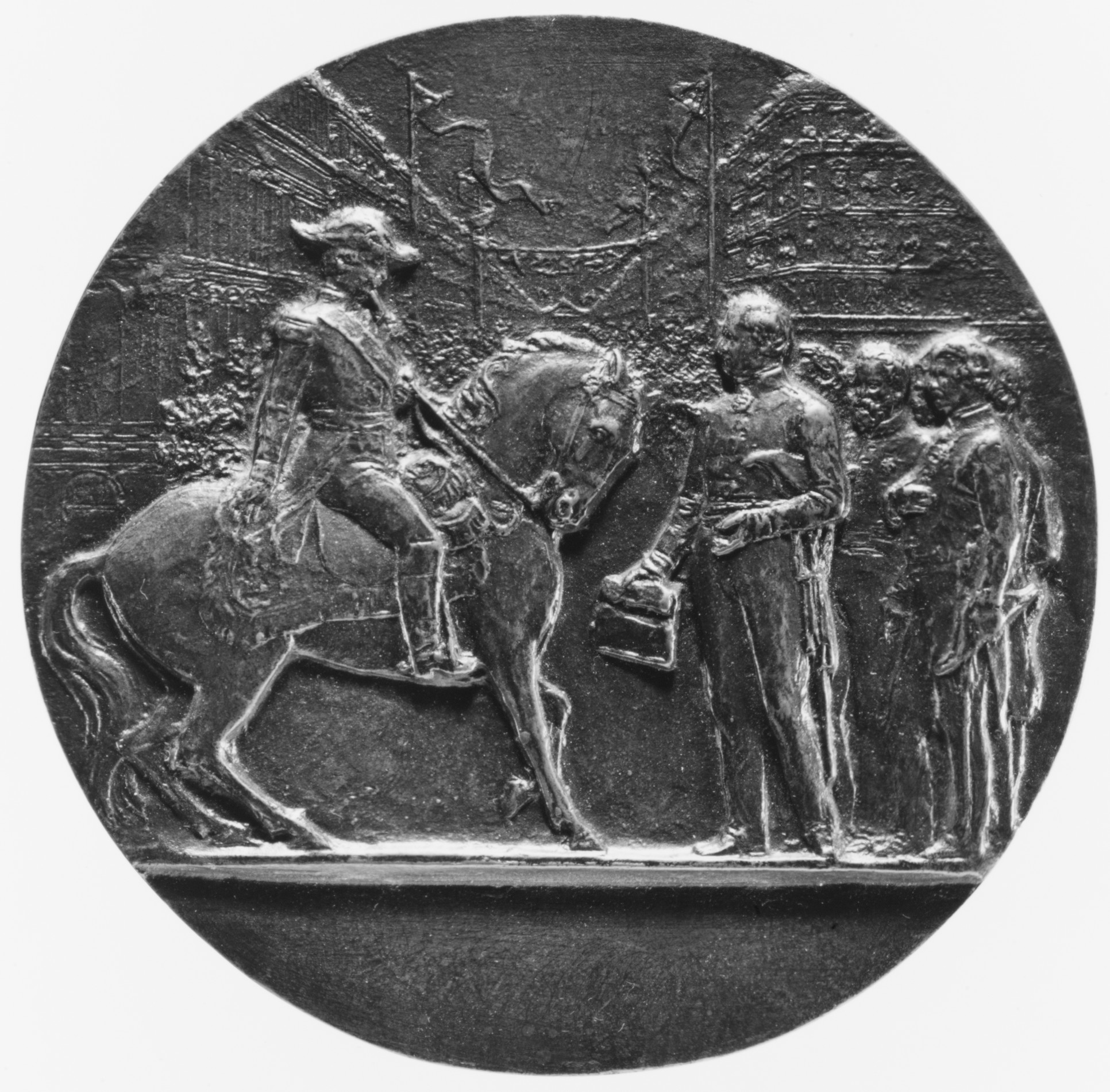
Napoleon III on Horseback; inaugurating the Boulevard de Strasbourg

In 1871, he was appointed a Professor at the École des Beaux-Arts. His notable students there would include Oscar Roty, Alexandre Charpentier, Ovide Yencesse, Abel Lafleur, and Paul Niclausse. The following year he remarried, to Marie Suligowtoski-Dunin. They settled in Malakoff, and had eight children. He was also elected a member of the Municipal Council where, in 1881, he proposed that the Republic should be acclaimed after each meeting. His proposal was adopted by a large margin. Later, he served on a commission in charge of creating a new cemetery, for which he sculpted a monument. He resigned from the Council in 1884.

He died at home in 1903, and was interred at the nearby Vanves Cemetery. A room in the Musée du 11 Conti in Paris has been named after him, as have streets in Belmont and Malakoff.
