= Communauté de communes des Vosges côté Sud-Ouest =

Federation of municipalities in France

Vosges côté Sud-Ouest
- Communauté de communes
- Interactive map of Vosges côté Sud-Ouest
- Coordinates: 48°05′N 06°03′E
- Country: France
- Region: Grand Est
- Department: Vosges
- No. of communes: {{{nbcomm}}}
- Established: 2017
- Area: 693.6 km^{2} (267.8 sq mi)
- Population (2019): 11,923
  - Density: 17.19/km^{2} (44.52/sq mi)

The Communauté de communes des Vosges côté Sud-Ouest is an administrative association of rural communes in the Vosges department of eastern France. It was created on 1 January 2017 by the merger of the former Communauté de communes des Marches de Lorraine, Communauté de communes du Pays de la Saône Vosgienne, Communauté de communes du Pays de Saône et Madon and the commune Grandrupt-de-Bains. Its seat is at Darney and it has its administrative offices at Lamarche. Its area is 693.6 km^{2}, and its population was 11,923 in 2019.

== Composition ==
The communauté de communes consists of the following 60 communes:

1. Ainvelle
2. Ameuvelle
3. Attigny
4. Belmont-lès-Darney
5. Belrupt
6. Bleurville
7. Blevaincourt
8. Bonvillet
9. Châtillon-sur-Saône
10. Claudon
11. Damblain
12. Darney
13. Dombasle-devant-Darney
14. Dombrot-le-Sec
15. Dommartin-lès-Vallois
16. Escles
17. Esley
18. Fignévelle
19. Fouchécourt
20. Frain
21. Frénois
22. Gignéville
23. Godoncourt
24. Grandrupt-de-Bains
25. Grignoncourt
26. Hennezel
27. Isches
28. Jésonville
29. Lamarche
30. Lerrain
31. Lignéville
32. Lironcourt
33. Marey
34. Martigny-les-Bains
35. Martinvelle
36. Monthureux-sur-Saône
37. Mont-lès-Lamarche
38. Morizécourt
39. Nonville
40. Pont-lès-Bonfays
41. Provenchères-lès-Darney
42. Regnévelle
43. Relanges
44. Robécourt
45. Romain-aux-Bois
46. Rozières-sur-Mouzon
47. Saint-Baslemont
48. Saint-Julien
49. Sans-Vallois
50. Senaide
51. Senonges
52. Serécourt
53. Serocourt
54. Les Thons
55. Tignécourt
56. Tollaincourt
57. Les Vallois
58. Villotte
59. Vioménil
60. Viviers-le-Gras
