= Paul Niclausse =

French sculptor

Paul Niclausse (1879–1958) was a French sculptor, most famous for his art deco medals cast in bronze.

He was awarded the Legion of Honor. In Paris, he taught at the École nationale supérieure des arts décoratifs and was also a professor at the Ecole des Beaux-Arts.

== Biography ==
Paul Niclausse was born in Metz during the occupation of the Alsace-Lorraine by the German Empire (1871-1918). He was a pupil of Hubert Ponscarme and Gabriel-Jules Thomas at the École des Beaux-Arts in Paris.

He exhibited his work at the Société des Artistes Français where he obtained an honorable mention in 1898 and a bronze medal in 1900. He became a member in 1903. At the Paris Salon 1908 he exhibited nine portrait-plaquettes.

Appointed a professor at the École nationale supérieure des arts décoratifs in Paris in 1930, he was also elected as a member of the Académie des Beaux-Arts in 1943 in the Institut de France. Later, he would be appointed knight of the Legion of Honour.

After settling in Faremoutiers (Seine-et-Marne), he died in his house in the 6th arrondissement of Paris in 1958.
