= Dombasle-devant-Darney =

- Commune
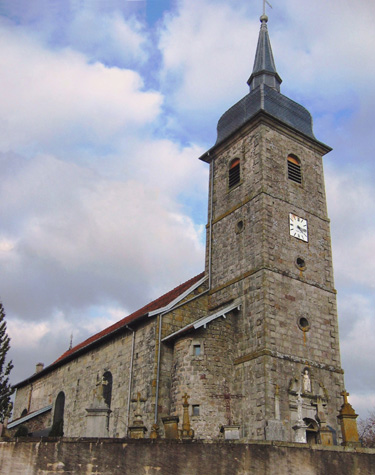
- The church in Dombasle-devant-Darney
- Location of Dombasle-devant-Darney
- Location within France Location within Grand Est
- Coordinates: 48°07′40″N 6°04′39″E
- Country: France
- Region: Grand Est
- Department: Vosges
- Arrondissement: Neufchâteau
- Canton: Darney
- Intercommunality: CC Vosges côté Sud-Ouest

Government
  - Mayor (2020–2026): Alain Grandclerc
- Area^{1}: 8.73 km^{2} (3.37 sq mi)
- Elevation: 320 m (1,050 ft)
- Highest elevation: 416 m (1,365 ft)
- Lowest elevation: 282 m (925 ft)
- Population (2023): 78
  - Density: 8.9/km^{2} (23/sq mi)
- Time zone: UTC+01:00 (CET)
  - Summer (DST): UTC+02:00 (CEST)
- INSEE/Postal code: 88138 /88260
- ^{1} French Land Register data, which excludes lakes, ponds, glaciers > 1 km^{2} (0.386 sq mi or 247 acres) and river estuaries.

Dombasle-devant-Darney (French pronunciation: [dɔ̃bal dəvɑ̃ daʁnɛ], literally Dombasle before Darney) is a commune in the Vosges department in Grand Est in northeastern France.

== See also ==
- Communes of the Vosges department
