= Saint-Baslemont =

- Commune
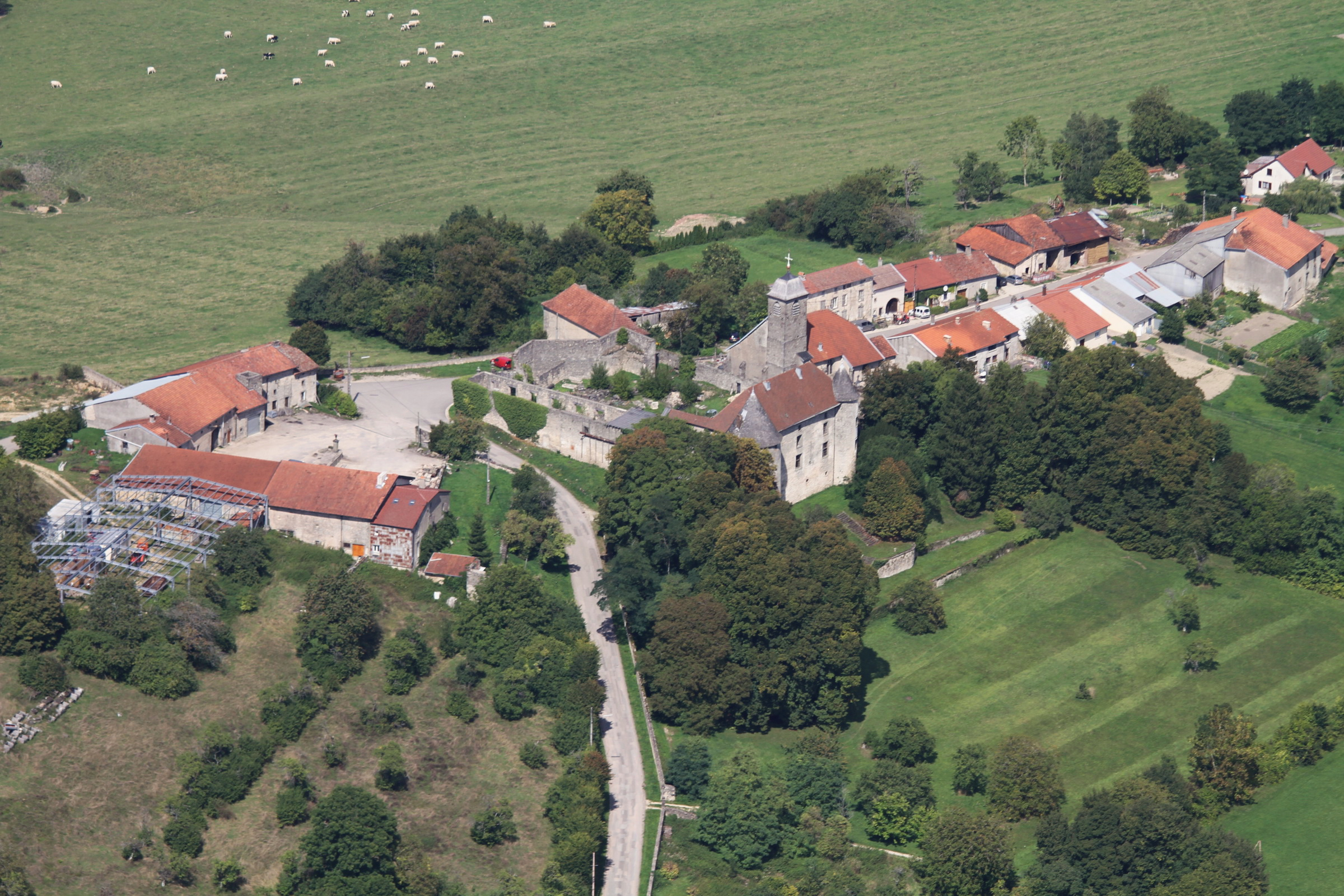
- An aerial view of Saint-Baslemont

- Coat of arms
- Location of Saint-Baslemont
- Location within France Location within Grand Est
- Coordinates: 48°09′10″N 5°59′38″E
- Country: France
- Region: Grand Est
- Department: Vosges
- Arrondissement: Neufchâteau
- Canton: Darney
- Intercommunality: CC Vosges côté Sud-Ouest

Government
  - Mayor (2020–2026): Pascal Boyé
- Area^{1}: 12.71 km^{2} (4.91 sq mi)
- Highest elevation: 457 m (1,499 ft)
- Lowest elevation: 293 m (961 ft)
- Population (2023): 87
  - Density: 6.8/km^{2} (18/sq mi)
- Time zone: UTC+01:00 (CET)
  - Summer (DST): UTC+02:00 (CEST)
- INSEE/Postal code: 88411 /88260
- ^{1} French Land Register data, which excludes lakes, ponds, glaciers > 1 km^{2} (0.386 sq mi or 247 acres) and river estuaries.

Saint-Baslemont (French pronunciation: [sɛ̃ balmɔ̃]) is a commune in the Vosges department in Grand Est in northeastern France.

== See also ==
- Communes of the Vosges department
