= Senonges =

- Commune
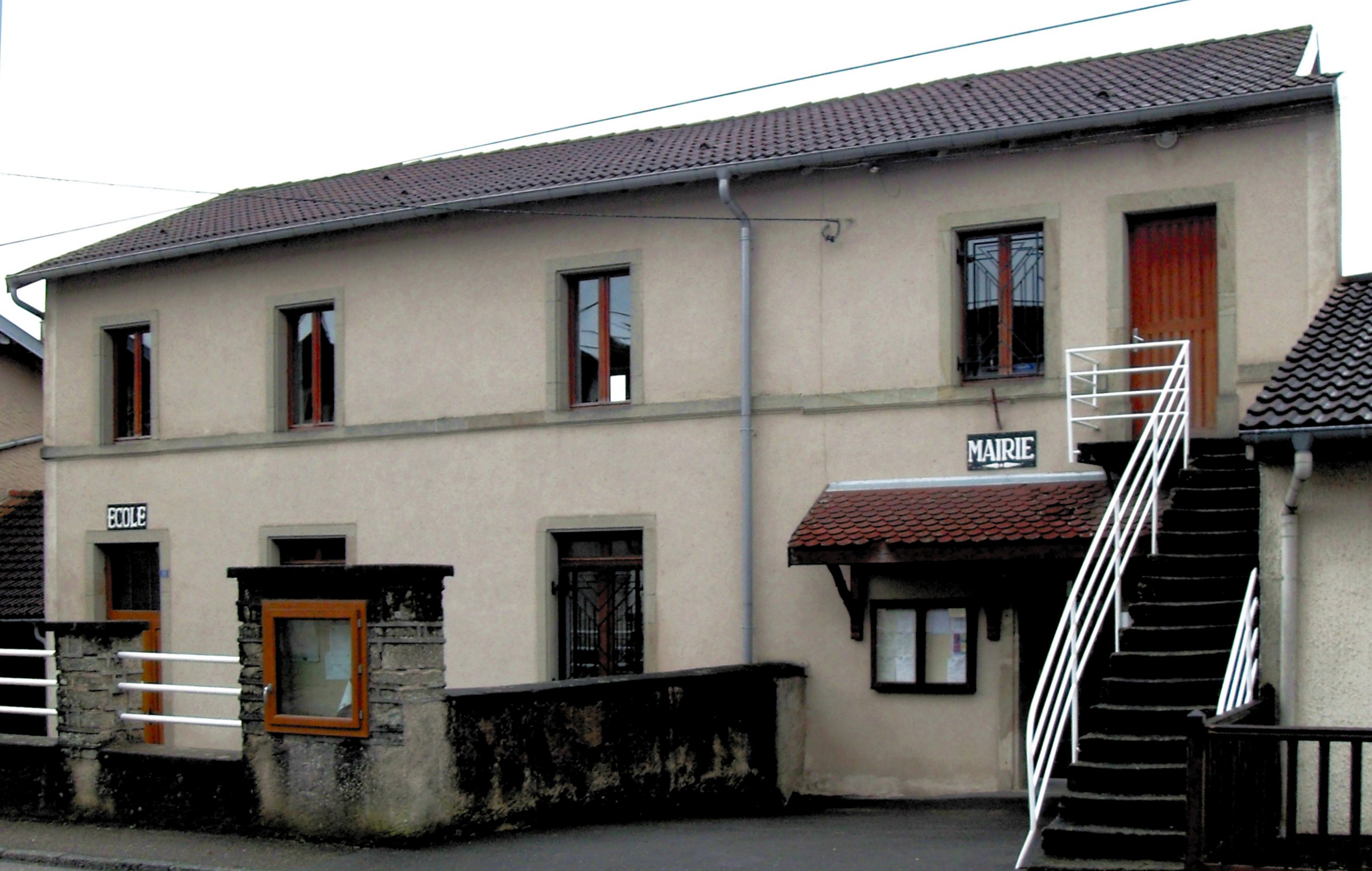
- The town hall in Senonges
- Location of Senonges
- Location within France Location within Grand Est
- Coordinates: 48°08′50″N 6°03′46″E
- Country: France
- Region: Grand Est
- Department: Vosges
- Arrondissement: Neufchâteau
- Canton: Darney
- Intercommunality: CC Vosges côté Sud-Ouest

Government
  - Mayor (2020–2026): Michel Gaudé
- Area^{1}: 5.84 km^{2} (2.25 sq mi)
- Elevation: 360 m (1,180 ft)
- Highest elevation: 394 m (1,293 ft)
- Lowest elevation: 292 m (958 ft)
- Population (2023): 131
  - Density: 22.4/km^{2} (58.1/sq mi)
- Time zone: UTC+01:00 (CET)
  - Summer (DST): UTC+02:00 (CEST)
- INSEE/Postal code: 88452 /88260
- ^{1} French Land Register data, which excludes lakes, ponds, glaciers > 1 km^{2} (0.386 sq mi or 247 acres) and river estuaries.

Senonges (French pronunciation: [sənɔ̃ʒ]) is a commune in the Vosges department in Grand Est in northeastern France.

== See also ==
- Communes of the Vosges department
