= Escles =

- Commune
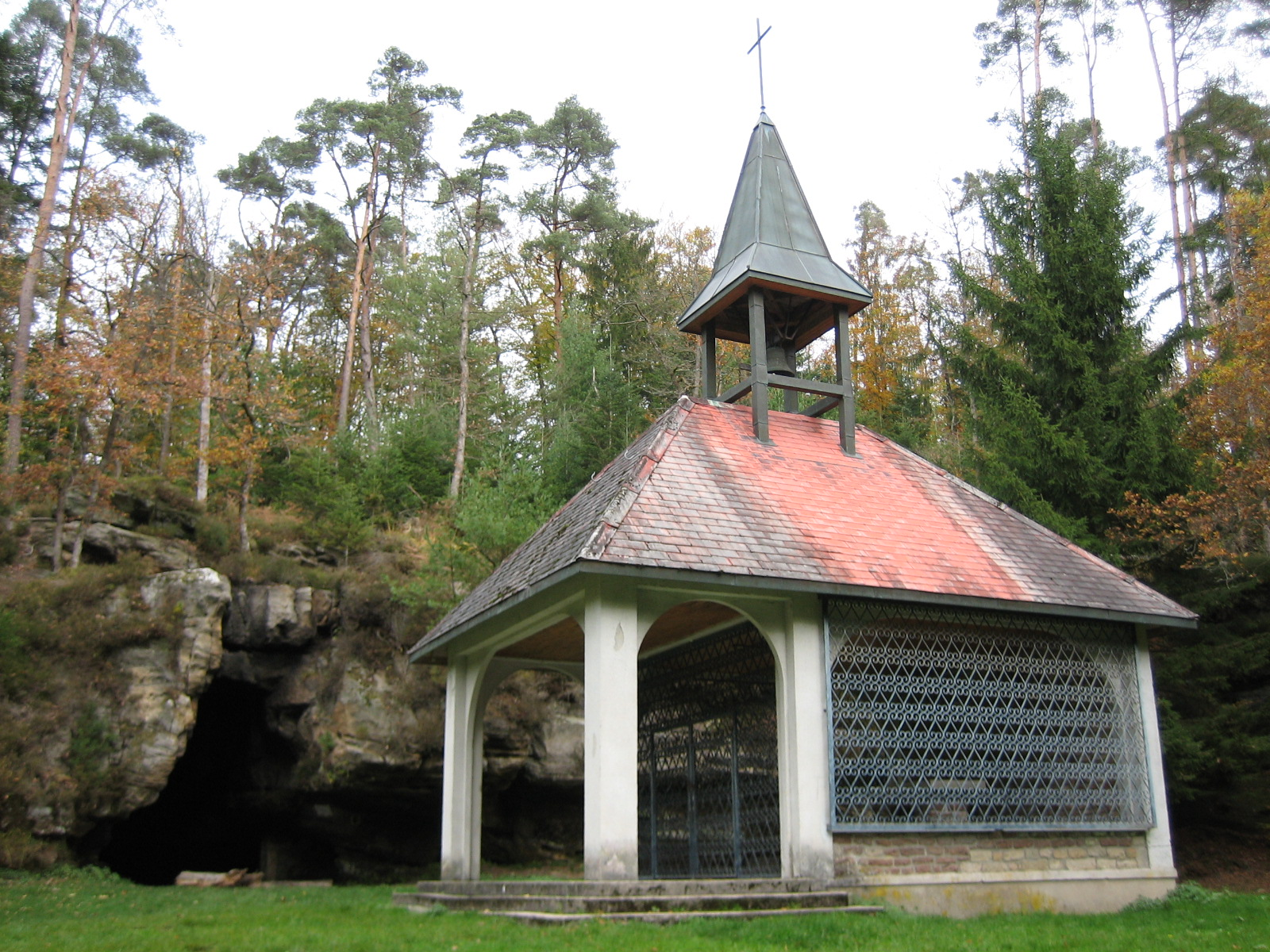
- Chapel and cave of Saint-Martin
- Location of Escles
- Location within France Location within Grand Est
- Coordinates: 48°07′47″N 6°10′43″E
- Country: France
- Region: Grand Est
- Department: Vosges
- Arrondissement: Neufchâteau
- Canton: Darney
- Intercommunality: CC Vosges côté Sud-Ouest

Government
  - Mayor (2020–2026): Patrick Vagner
- Area^{1}: 22.54 km^{2} (8.70 sq mi)
- Elevation: 330 m (1,080 ft)
- Highest elevation: 420 m (1,380 ft)
- Lowest elevation: 285 m (935 ft)
- Population (2023): 382
  - Density: 16.9/km^{2} (43.9/sq mi)
- Time zone: UTC+01:00 (CET)
  - Summer (DST): UTC+02:00 (CEST)
- INSEE/Postal code: 88161 /88260
- ^{1} French Land Register data, which excludes lakes, ponds, glaciers > 1 km^{2} (0.386 sq mi or 247 acres) and river estuaries.

Escles (French pronunciation: [ɛkl]) is a commune in the Vosges department in Grand Est in northeastern France.

== Geography ==
The river Madon flows through the commune.

== See also ==
- Communes of the Vosges department
