= Lironcourt =

- Commune
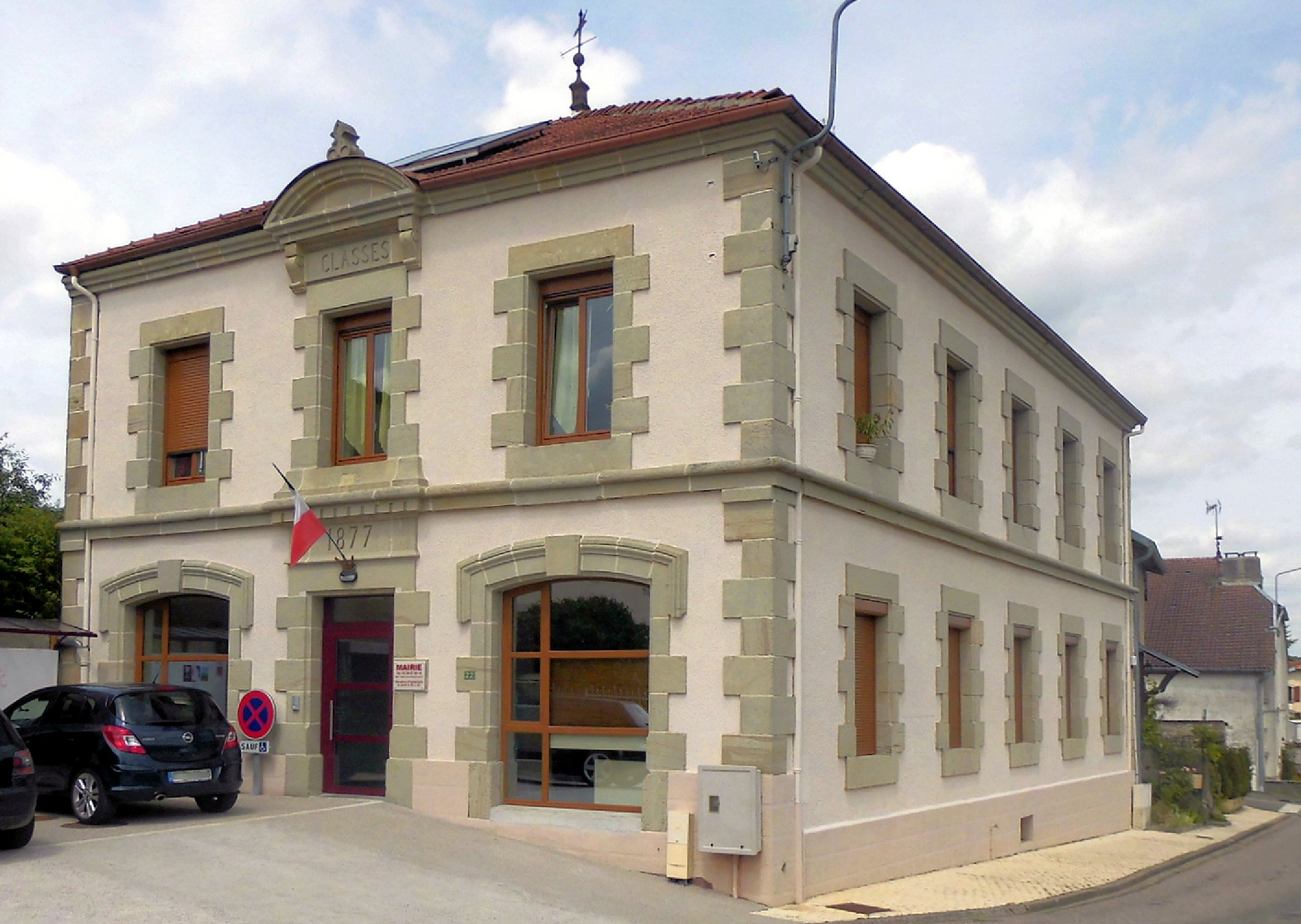
- The town hall in Lironcourt
- Location of Lironcourt
- Location within France Location within Grand Est
- Coordinates: 47°58′16″N 5°53′42″E
- Country: France
- Region: Grand Est
- Department: Vosges
- Arrondissement: Neufchâteau
- Canton: Darney
- Intercommunality: CC Vosges côté Sud-Ouest

Government
  - Mayor (2020–2026): Dominique Mougin
- Area^{1}: 4.84 km^{2} (1.87 sq mi)
- Highest elevation: 402 m (1,319 ft)
- Lowest elevation: 232 m (761 ft)
- Population (2023): 68
  - Density: 14/km^{2} (36/sq mi)
- Time zone: UTC+01:00 (CET)
  - Summer (DST): UTC+02:00 (CEST)
- INSEE/Postal code: 88272 /88410
- ^{1} French Land Register data, which excludes lakes, ponds, glaciers > 1 km^{2} (0.386 sq mi or 247 acres) and river estuaries.

Lironcourt (French pronunciation: [liʁɔ̃kuʁ]) is a commune in the Vosges department in Grand Est in northeastern France.

== See also ==
- Communes of the Vosges department
