= Esley =

- Commune
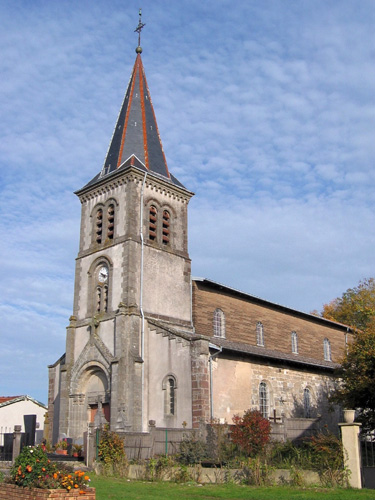
- The church in Esley

- Coat of arms
- Location of Esley
- Location within France Location within Grand Est
- Coordinates: 48°10′13″N 6°03′30″E
- Country: France
- Region: Grand Est
- Department: Vosges
- Arrondissement: Neufchâteau
- Canton: Darney
- Intercommunality: CC Vosges côté Sud-Ouest

Government
  - Mayor (2020–2026): Christelle Thiebaut
- Area^{1}: 11 km^{2} (4.2 sq mi)
- Elevation: 337 m (1,106 ft)
- Highest elevation: 421 m (1,381 ft)
- Lowest elevation: 314 m (1,030 ft)
- Population (2023): 166
  - Density: 15/km^{2} (39/sq mi)
- Time zone: UTC+01:00 (CET)
  - Summer (DST): UTC+02:00 (CEST)
- INSEE/Postal code: 88162 /88260
- ^{1} French Land Register data, which excludes lakes, ponds, glaciers > 1 km^{2} (0.386 sq mi or 247 acres) and river estuaries.

Esley (French pronunciation: [elɛ]) is a commune in the Vosges department in Grand Est in northeastern France.

== See also ==
- Communes of the Vosges department
