= Dommartin-lès-Vallois =

- Commune
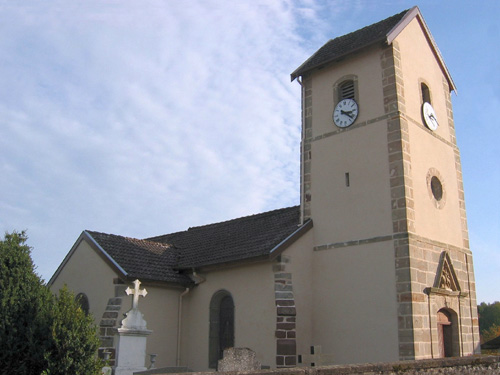
- The church in Dommartin-lès-Vallois
- Location of Dommartin-lès-Vallois
- Location within France Location within Grand Est
- Coordinates: 48°09′23″N 6°05′14″E
- Country: France
- Region: Grand Est
- Department: Vosges
- Arrondissement: Neufchâteau
- Canton: Darney
- Intercommunality: CC Vosges côté Sud-Ouest

Government
  - Mayor (2020–2026): Pascal Lelarge
- Area^{1}: 4.93 km^{2} (1.90 sq mi)
- Elevation: 345 m (1,132 ft)
- Highest elevation: 406 m (1,332 ft)
- Lowest elevation: 323 m (1,060 ft)
- Population (2023): 52
  - Density: 11/km^{2} (27/sq mi)
- Time zone: UTC+01:00 (CET)
  - Summer (DST): UTC+02:00 (CEST)
- INSEE/Postal code: 88149 /88260
- ^{1} French Land Register data, which excludes lakes, ponds, glaciers > 1 km^{2} (0.386 sq mi or 247 acres) and river estuaries.

Dommartin-lès-Vallois (French pronunciation: [dɔmaʁtɛ̃ lɛ valwa], literally Dommartin near Vallois) is a commune in the Vosges department in Grand Est in northeastern France.

== Demography ==
Historical population
| Year | Pop. | ±% p.a. |
|---|---|---|
| 1968 | 50 | — |
| 1975 | 51 | +0.28% |
| 1982 | 41 | −3.07% |
| 1990 | 41 | +0.00% |
| 1999 | 66 | +5.43% |
| 2007 | 55 | −2.25% |
| 2012 | 58 | +1.07% |
| 2017 | 55 | −1.06% |
| 2023 | 52 | −0.93% |
Source: INSEE

== See also ==
- Communes of the Vosges department
