= Saint-Julien, Vosges =

Saint-Julien
- Commune
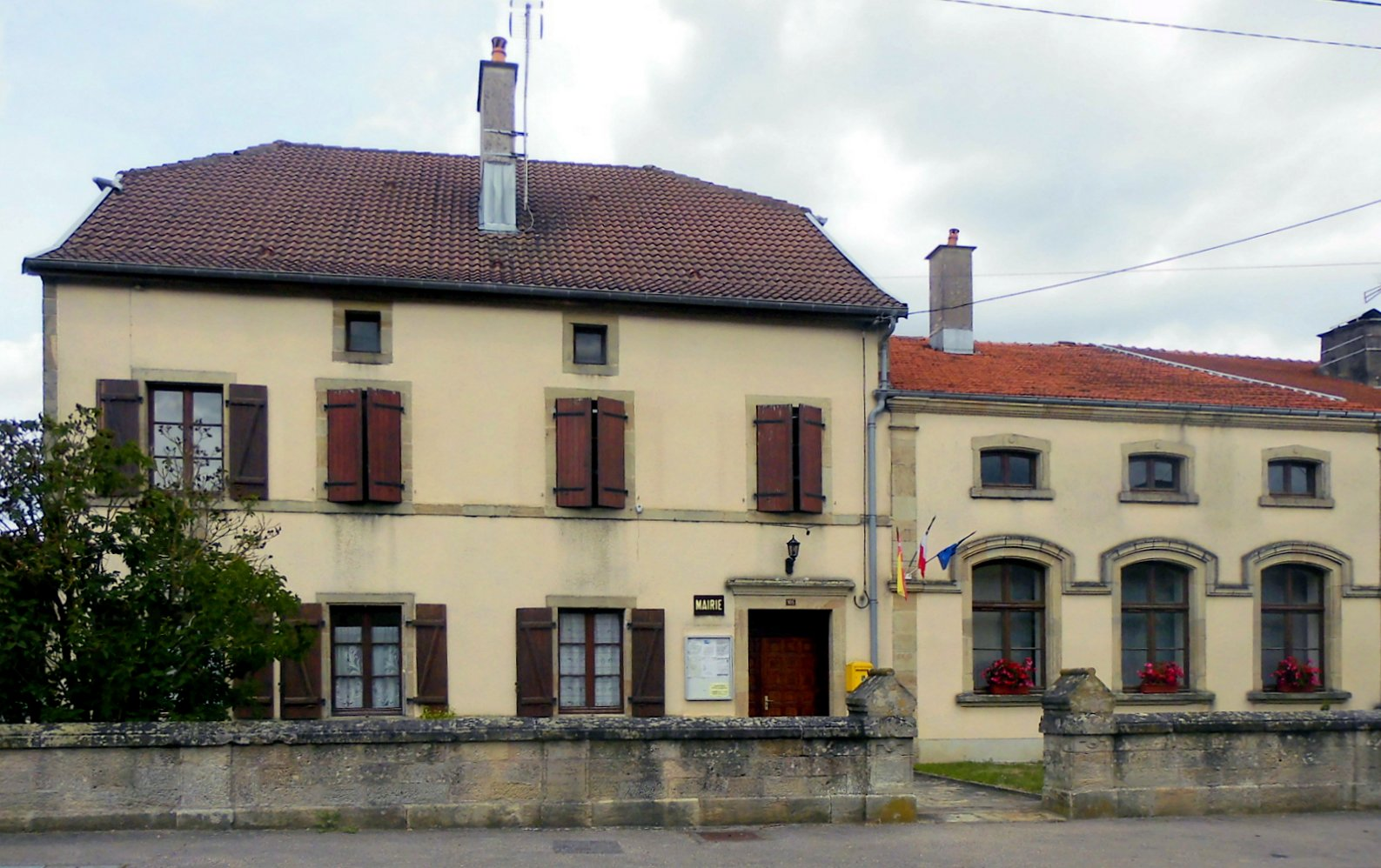
- The town hall in Saint-Julien
- Location of Saint-Julien
- Location within France Location within Grand Est
- Coordinates: 48°01′12″N 5°53′48″E
- Country: France
- Region: Grand Est
- Department: Vosges
- Arrondissement: Neufchâteau
- Canton: Darney
- Intercommunality: CC Vosges côté Sud-Ouest

Government
  - Mayor (2020–2026): Nicolas Grandclaude
- Area^{1}: 14.11 km^{2} (5.45 sq mi)
- Elevation: 326 m (1,070 ft)
- Highest elevation: 333 m (1,093 ft)
- Lowest elevation: 236 m (774 ft)
- Population (2023): 103
  - Density: 7.30/km^{2} (18.9/sq mi)
- Time zone: UTC+01:00 (CET)
  - Summer (DST): UTC+02:00 (CEST)
- INSEE/Postal code: 88421 /88410
- ^{1} French Land Register data, which excludes lakes, ponds, glaciers > 1 km^{2} (0.386 sq mi or 247 acres) and river estuaries.

Saint-Julien (French pronunciation: [sɛ̃ ʒyljɛ̃]) is a commune in the Vosges department in Grand Est in northeastern France.

== See also ==
- Communes of the Vosges department
