= Lignéville =

- Commune
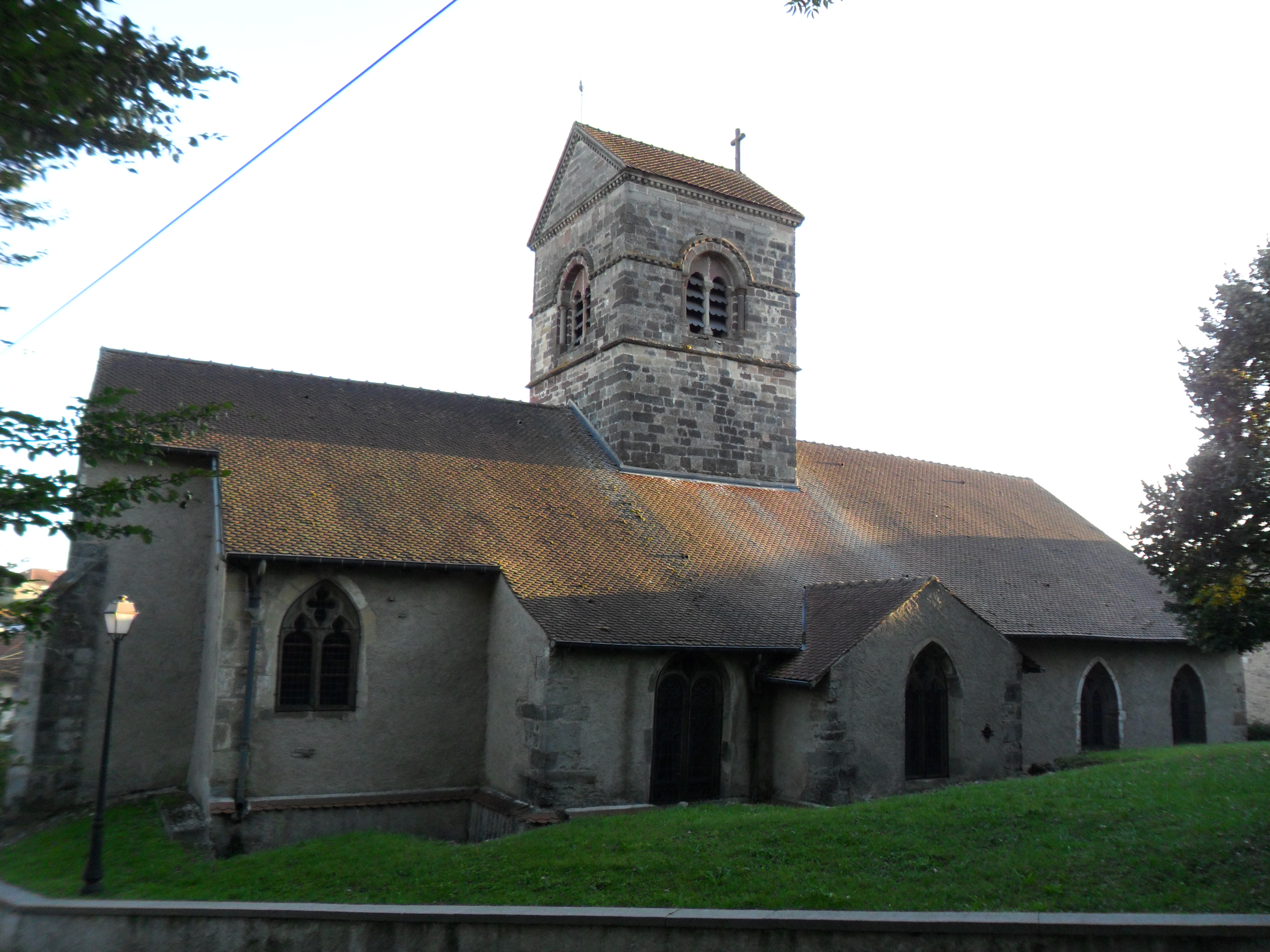
- The church in Lignéville

- Coat of arms
- Location of Lignéville
- Location within France Location within Grand Est
- Coordinates: 48°10′00″N 5°57′07″E
- Country: France
- Region: Grand Est
- Department: Vosges
- Arrondissement: Neufchâteau
- Canton: Vittel
- Intercommunality: Vosges Côté Sud-Ouest

Government
  - Mayor (2020–2026): Gilbert Bogard
- Area^{1}: 12.53 km^{2} (4.84 sq mi)
- Elevation: 410 m (1,350 ft)
- Highest elevation: 457 m (1,499 ft)
- Lowest elevation: 362 m (1,188 ft)
- Population (2023): 298
  - Density: 23.8/km^{2} (61.6/sq mi)
- Demonym(s): Lignévillois, Lignévilloises
- Time zone: UTC+01:00 (CET)
  - Summer (DST): UTC+02:00 (CEST)
- INSEE/Postal code: 88271 /88800
- ^{1} French Land Register data, which excludes lakes, ponds, glaciers > 1 km^{2} (0.386 sq mi or 247 acres) and river estuaries.

Lignéville (French pronunciation: [liɲevil]) is a commune in the Vosges department in Grand Est in northeastern France.

== Population ==
Historical population
Year	Pop.	±% p.a.
1968	272	—
1975	288	+0.82%
1982	310	+1.06%
1990	323	+0.51%
1999	309	−0.49%
2007	295	−0.58%
2012	320	+1.64%
2017	315	−0.31%
2023	298	−0.92%
Source: INSEE

== Climate ==
Climate data for Ligneville (2001–2020 averages)
Month	Jan	Feb	Mar	Apr	May	Jun	Jul	Aug	Sep	Oct	Nov	Dec	Year
Record high °C (°F)	14.2 (57.6)	20.2 (68.4)	23.7 (74.7)	27.6 (81.7)	30.2 (86.4)	35.4 (95.7)	38.7 (101.7)	37.8 (100.0)	32.3 (90.1)	26.1 (79.0)	20.9 (69.6)	15.5 (59.9)	38.7 (101.7)
Mean daily maximum °C (°F)	3.6 (38.5)	5.4 (41.7)	10.3 (50.5)	15.3 (59.5)	18.4 (65.1)	23.0 (73.4)	24.7 (76.5)	24.0 (75.2)	20.2 (68.4)	14.4 (57.9)	8.5 (47.3)	4.6 (40.3)	14.4 (57.9)
Daily mean °C (°F)	1.3 (34.3)	2.4 (36.3)	6.0 (42.8)	10.2 (50.4)	13.3 (55.9)	17.5 (63.5)	19.3 (66.7)	18.8 (65.8)	15.2 (59.4)	10.7 (51.3)	5.9 (42.6)	2.4 (36.3)	10.3 (50.5)
Mean daily minimum °C (°F)	−1.0 (30.2)	−0.6 (30.9)	1.7 (35.1)	5.1 (41.2)	8.3 (46.9)	12.1 (53.8)	13.8 (56.8)	13.6 (56.5)	10.2 (50.4)	7.0 (44.6)	3.3 (37.9)	0.2 (32.4)	6.1 (43.0)
Record low °C (°F)	−12.9 (8.8)	−15.0 (5.0)	−13.9 (7.0)	−6.9 (19.6)	−0.2 (31.6)	2.9 (37.2)	6.4 (43.5)	6.3 (43.3)	1.6 (34.9)	−4.9 (23.2)	−9.9 (14.2)	−17.5 (0.5)	−17.5 (0.5)
Average precipitation mm (inches)	73.0 (2.87)	62.0 (2.44)	59.5 (2.34)	52.2 (2.06)	78.6 (3.09)	77.8 (3.06)	66.0 (2.60)	74.4 (2.93)	60.4 (2.38)	90.7 (3.57)	80.6 (3.17)	81.1 (3.19)	856.3 (33.71)
Average precipitation days (≥ 1.0 mm)	12.2	10.1	10.4	8.6	11.9	9.8	9.8	10.0	8.1	11.4	11.7	12.6	126.8
Mean monthly sunshine hours	57.9	84.9	163.0	200.9	216.3	236.2	252.0	222.2	190.8	115.0	62.5	46.8	1,848.3
Source: Meteociel

== See also ==
- Communes of the Vosges department
