= Belrupt =

- Commune
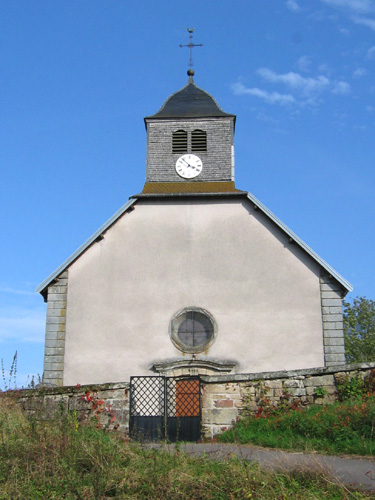
- The church in Belrupt

- Coat of arms
- Location of Belrupt
- Location within France Location within Grand Est
- Coordinates: 48°05′19″N 6°05′40″E
- Country: France
- Region: Grand Est
- Department: Vosges
- Arrondissement: Neufchâteau
- Canton: Darney
- Intercommunality: CC Vosges côté Sud-Ouest

Government
  - Mayor (2020–2026): Isabelle Fresse
- Area^{1}: 9.14 km^{2} (3.53 sq mi)
- Highest elevation: 358 m (1,175 ft)
- Lowest elevation: 278 m (912 ft)
- Population (2023): 88
  - Density: 9.6/km^{2} (25/sq mi)
- Time zone: UTC+01:00 (CET)
  - Summer (DST): UTC+02:00 (CEST)
- INSEE/Postal code: 88052 /88260
- ^{1} French Land Register data, which excludes lakes, ponds, glaciers > 1 km^{2} (0.386 sq mi or 247 acres) and river estuaries.

Belrupt (French pronunciation: [bɛlʁy]) is a commune in the Vosges department in Grand Est in northeastern France.

== See also ==
- Communes of the Vosges department
