= Lerrain =

- Commune
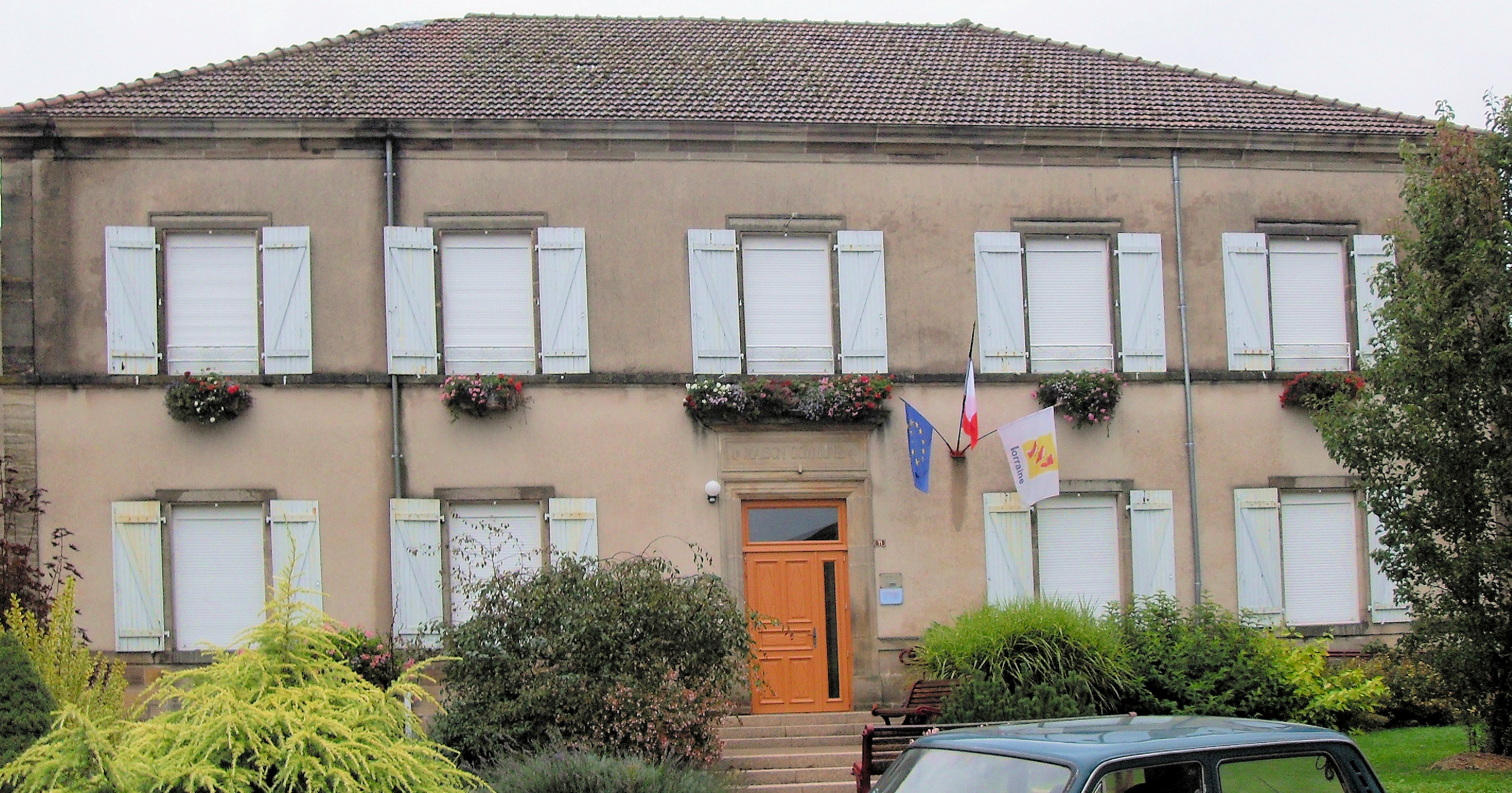
- The town hall in Lerrain
- Location of Lerrain
- Location within France Location within Grand Est
- Coordinates: 48°08′37″N 6°08′55″E
- Country: France
- Region: Grand Est
- Department: Vosges
- Arrondissement: Neufchâteau
- Canton: Darney
- Intercommunality: CC Vosges côté Sud-Ouest

Government
  - Mayor (2020–2026): Frédéric Balaud
- Area^{1}: 12.65 km^{2} (4.88 sq mi)
- Elevation: 317 m (1,040 ft)
- Highest elevation: 381 m (1,250 ft)
- Lowest elevation: 300 m (980 ft)
- Population (2023): 461
  - Density: 36.4/km^{2} (94.4/sq mi)
- Time zone: UTC+01:00 (CET)
  - Summer (DST): UTC+02:00 (CEST)
- INSEE/Postal code: 88267 /88260
- ^{1} French Land Register data, which excludes lakes, ponds, glaciers > 1 km^{2} (0.386 sq mi or 247 acres) and river estuaries.

Lerrain (French pronunciation: [lɛʁɛ̃]) is a commune in the Vosges department in Grand Est in northeastern France.

== Geography ==
The river Madon flows through the commune.

== See also ==
- Communes of the Vosges department
