= Bonvillet =

- Commune
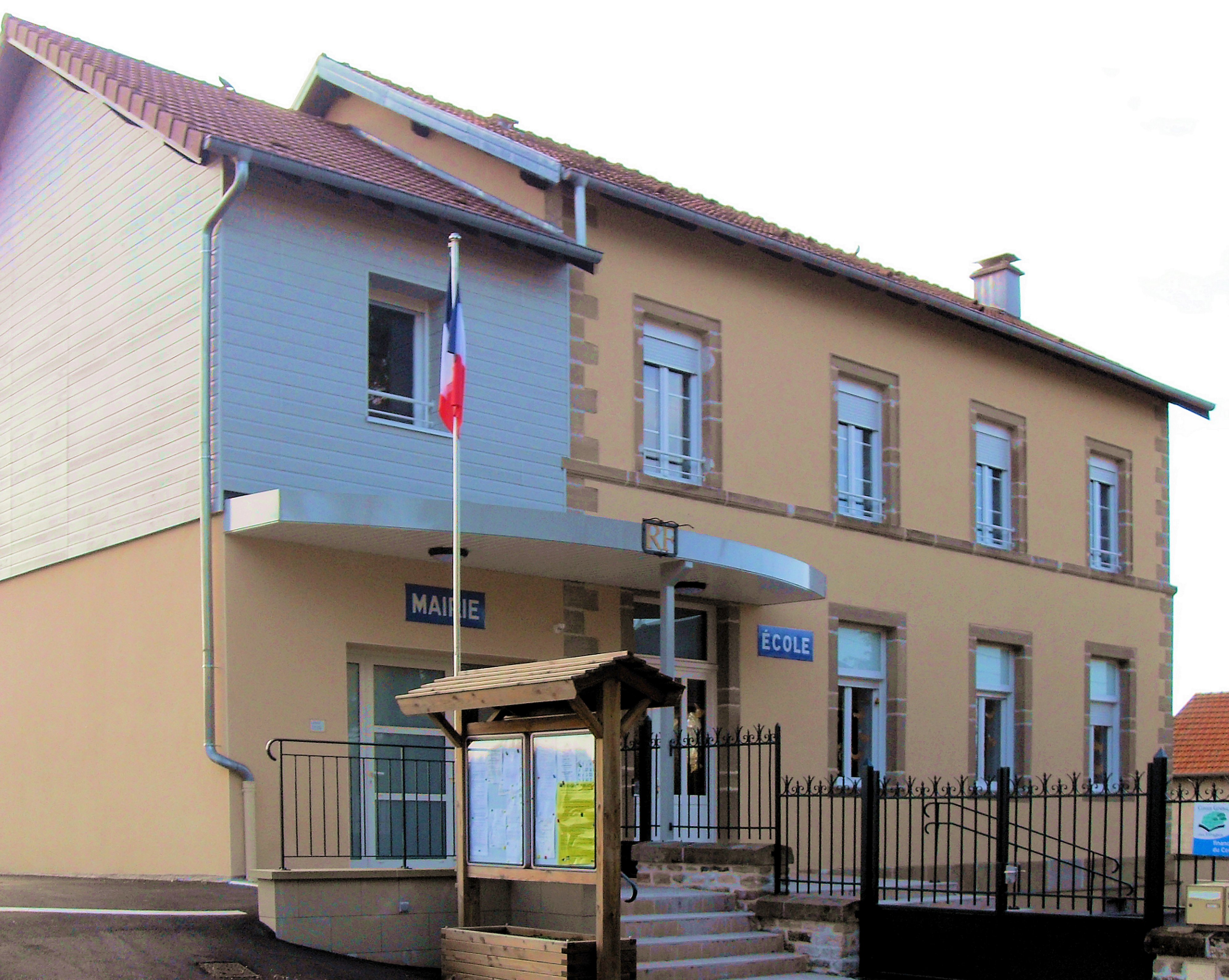
- The town hall and school in Bonvillet

- Coat of arms
- Location of Bonvillet
- Location within France Location within Grand Est
- Coordinates: 48°06′01″N 6°03′27″E
- Country: France
- Region: Grand Est
- Department: Vosges
- Arrondissement: Neufchâteau
- Canton: Darney
- Intercommunality: CC Vosges côté Sud-Ouest

Government
  - Mayor (2020–2026): François Thiery
- Area^{1}: 10.09 km^{2} (3.90 sq mi)
- Elevation: 290 m (950 ft)
- Highest elevation: 342 m (1,122 ft)
- Lowest elevation: 264 m (866 ft)
- Population (2023): 272
  - Density: 27.0/km^{2} (69.8/sq mi)
- Time zone: UTC+01:00 (CET)
  - Summer (DST): UTC+02:00 (CEST)
- INSEE/Postal code: 88065 /88260
- ^{1} French Land Register data, which excludes lakes, ponds, glaciers > 1 km^{2} (0.386 sq mi or 247 acres) and river estuaries.

Bonvillet (French pronunciation: [bɔ̃vilɛ]) is a commune in the Vosges department in Grand Est in north-eastern France.

== See also ==
- Communes of the Vosges department
