= Relanges =

- Commune
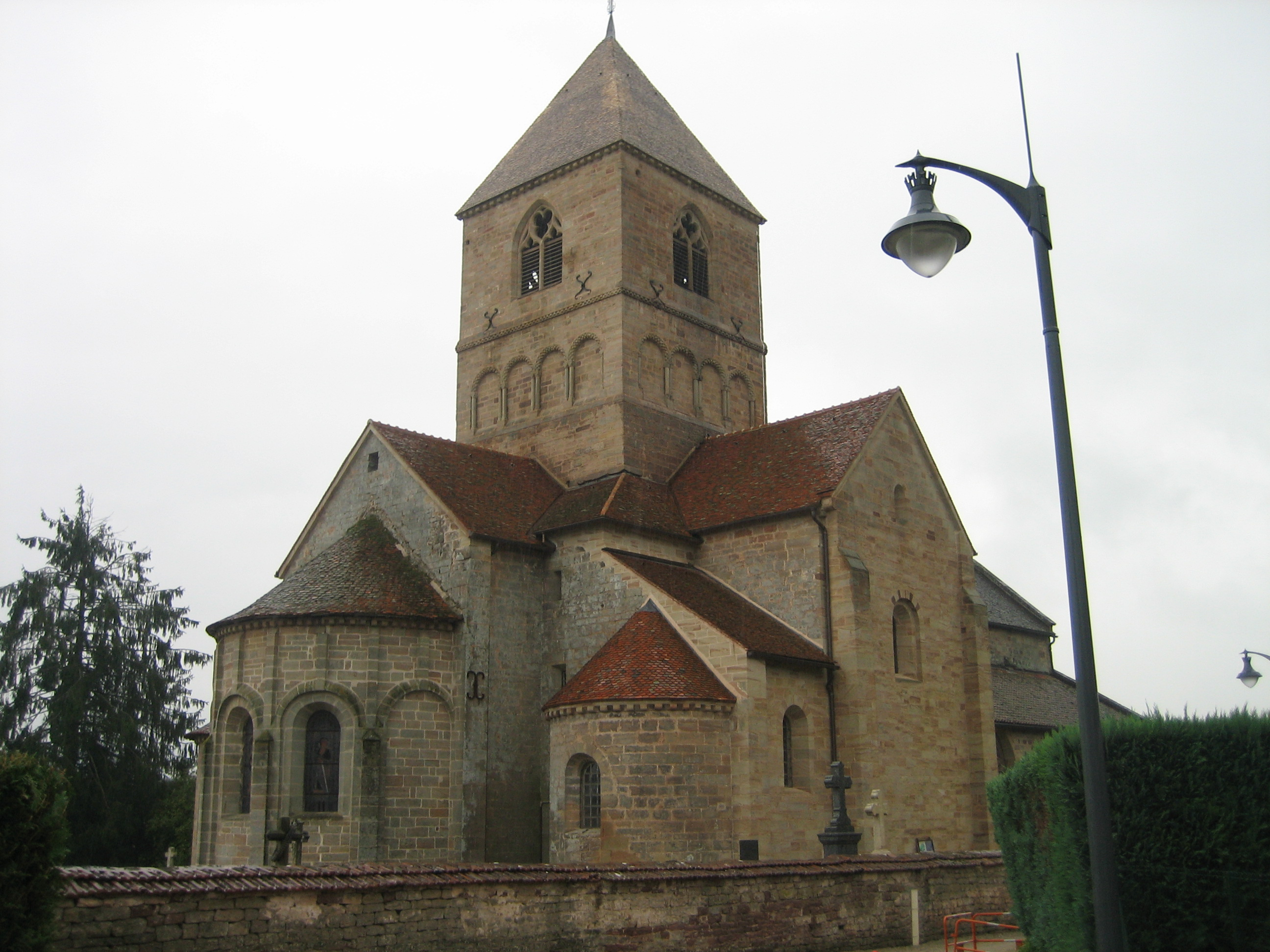
- Church of Notre-Dame
- Location of Relanges
- Location within France Location within Grand Est
- Coordinates: 48°06′49″N 6°01′00″E
- Country: France
- Region: Grand Est
- Department: Vosges
- Arrondissement: Neufchâteau
- Canton: Darney
- Intercommunality: CC Vosges côté Sud-Ouest

Government
  - Mayor (2020–2026): Philippe Thiéry
- Area^{1}: 13.87 km^{2} (5.36 sq mi)
- Highest elevation: 403 m (1,322 ft)
- Lowest elevation: 279 m (915 ft)
- Population (2023): 189
  - Density: 13.6/km^{2} (35.3/sq mi)
- Time zone: UTC+01:00 (CET)
  - Summer (DST): UTC+02:00 (CEST)
- INSEE/Postal code: 88381 /88260
- ^{1} French Land Register data, which excludes lakes, ponds, glaciers > 1 km^{2} (0.386 sq mi or 247 acres) and river estuaries.

Relanges (French pronunciation: [ʁəlɑ̃ʒ]) is a commune in the Vosges department in Grand Est in northeastern France.

== See also ==
- Communes of the Vosges department
