= Jésonville =

- Commune
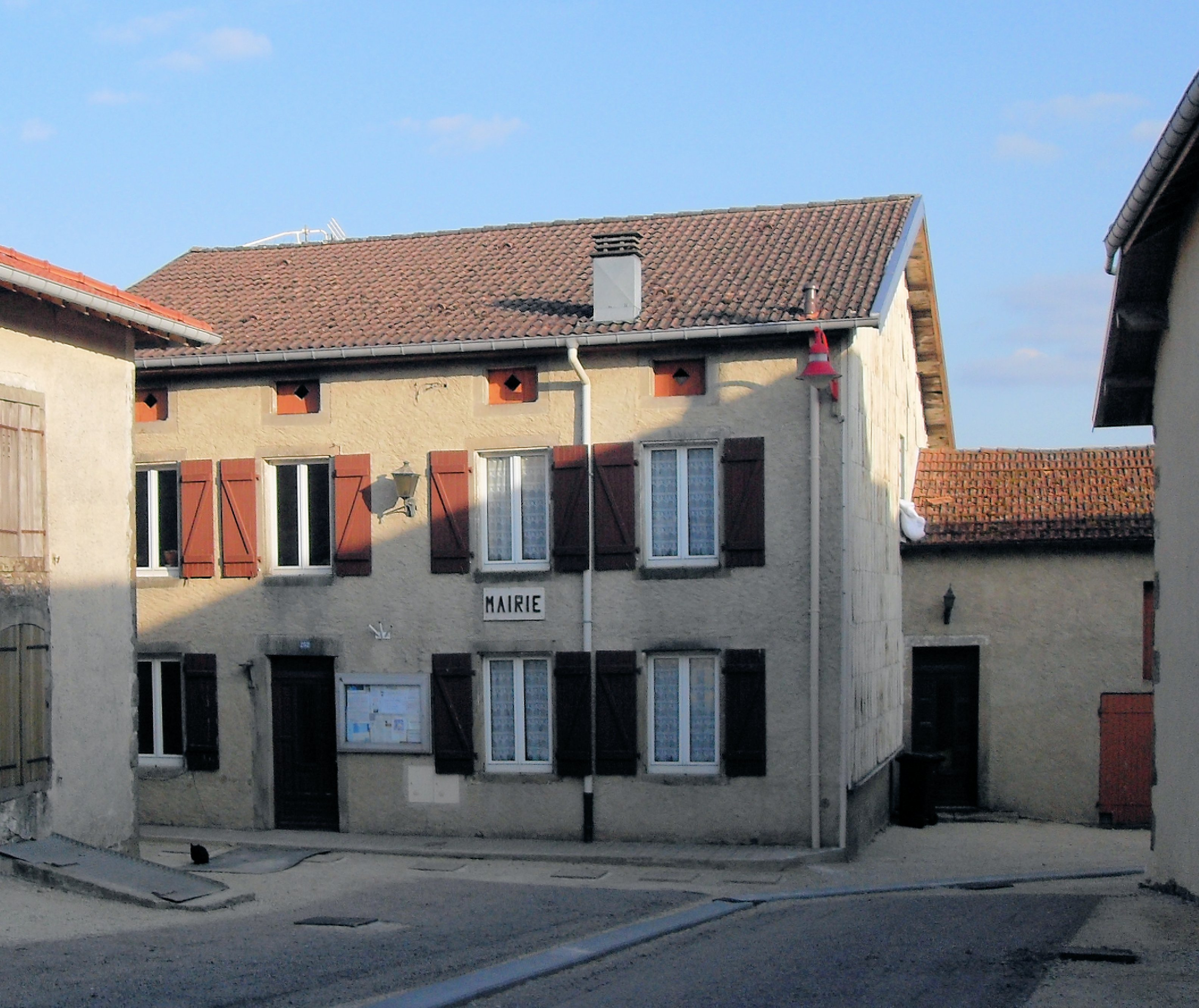
- The town hall in Jésonville
- Location of Jésonville
- Location within France Location within Grand Est
- Coordinates: 48°07′49″N 6°06′37″E
- Country: France
- Region: Grand Est
- Department: Vosges
- Arrondissement: Neufchâteau
- Canton: Darney
- Intercommunality: CC Vosges côté Sud-Ouest

Government
  - Mayor (2020–2026): Myriam Mathey
- Area^{1}: 6.96 km^{2} (2.69 sq mi)
- Elevation: 350 m (1,150 ft)
- Highest elevation: 412 m (1,352 ft)
- Lowest elevation: 314 m (1,030 ft)
- Population (2023): 148
  - Density: 21.3/km^{2} (55.1/sq mi)
- Time zone: UTC+01:00 (CET)
  - Summer (DST): UTC+02:00 (CEST)
- INSEE/Postal code: 88252 /88260
- ^{1} French Land Register data, which excludes lakes, ponds, glaciers > 1 km^{2} (0.386 sq mi or 247 acres) and river estuaries.

Jésonville (French pronunciation: [ʒezɔ̃vil]) is a commune in the Vosges department in Grand Est in northeastern France.

== See also ==
- Communes of the Vosges department
