= Grignoncourt =

- Commune
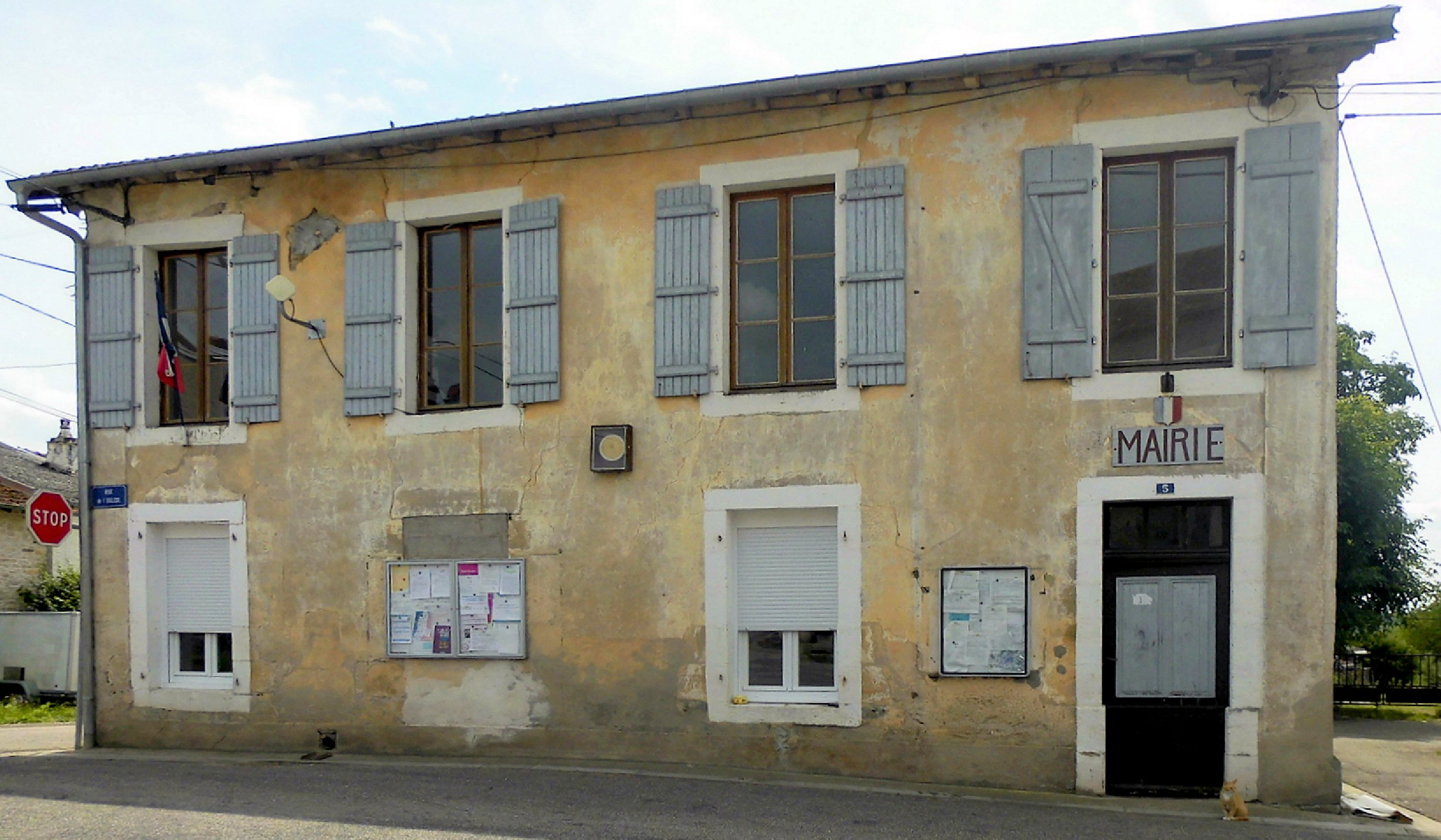
- The town hall in Grignoncourt
- Location of Grignoncourt
- Location within France Location within Grand Est
- Coordinates: 47°57′34″N 5°54′29″E
- Country: France
- Region: Grand Est
- Department: Vosges
- Arrondissement: Neufchâteau
- Canton: Darney
- Intercommunality: CC Vosges côté Sud-Ouest

Government
  - Mayor (2020–2026): Julien Grandieu
- Area^{1}: 5.41 km^{2} (2.09 sq mi)
- Elevation: 286 m (938 ft)
- Highest elevation: 315 m (1,033 ft)
- Lowest elevation: 227 m (745 ft)
- Population (2023): 46
  - Density: 8.5/km^{2} (22/sq mi)
- Time zone: UTC+01:00 (CET)
  - Summer (DST): UTC+02:00 (CEST)
- INSEE/Postal code: 88220 /88410
- ^{1} French Land Register data, which excludes lakes, ponds, glaciers > 1 km^{2} (0.386 sq mi or 247 acres) and river estuaries.

Grignoncourt (French pronunciation: [ɡʁiɲɔ̃kuʁ]) is a commune in the Vosges department in Grand Est in northeastern France.

== See also ==
- Communes of the Vosges department
