= Martinvelle =

- Commune
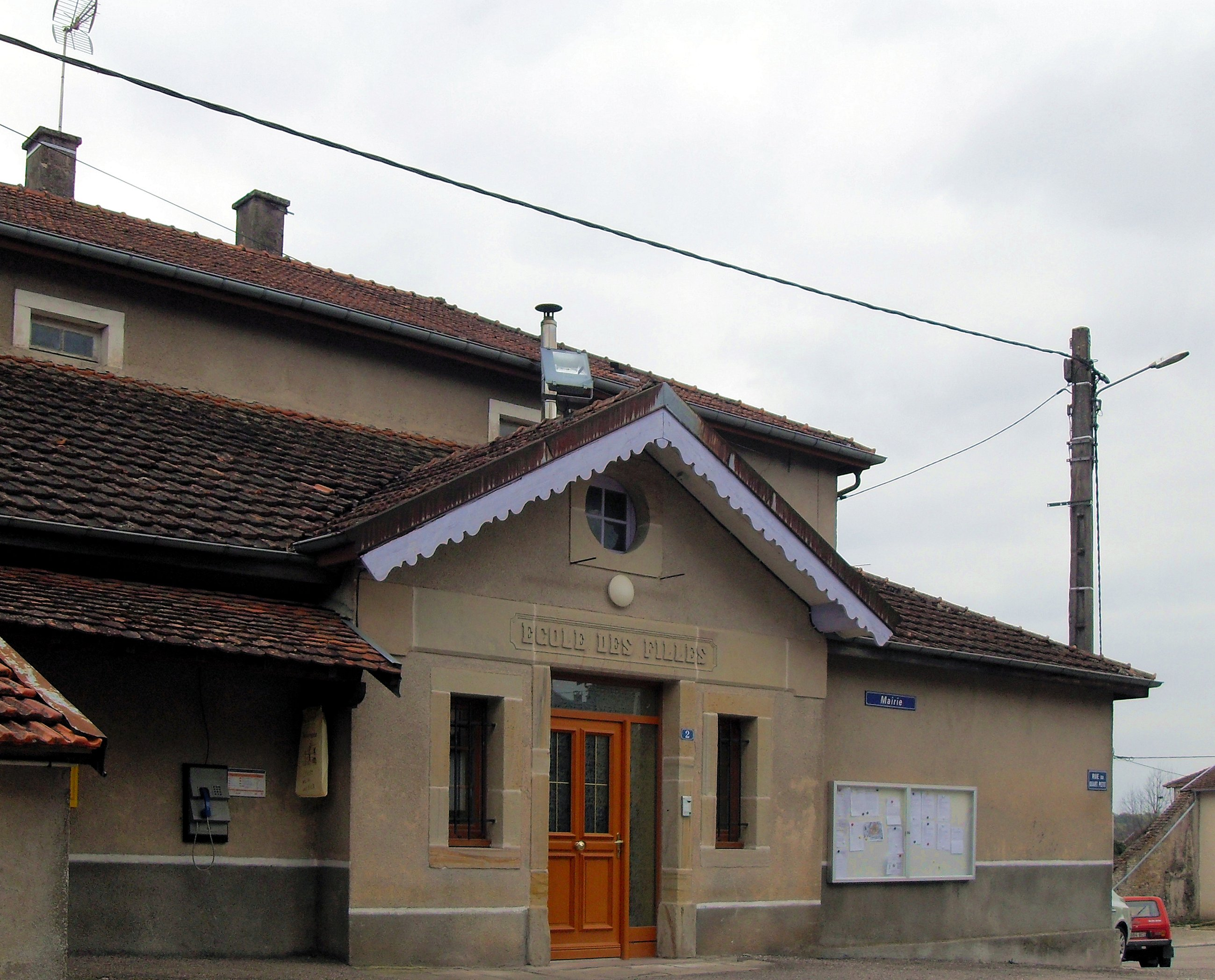
- The town hall in Martinvelle

- Coat of arms
- Location of Martinvelle
- Location within France Location within Grand Est
- Coordinates: 47°58′35″N 5°59′54″E
- Country: France
- Region: Grand Est
- Department: Vosges
- Arrondissement: Neufchâteau
- Canton: Darney
- Intercommunality: CC Vosges côté Sud-Ouest

Government
  - Mayor (2020–2026): Monique Roche
- Area^{1}: 24.73 km^{2} (9.55 sq mi)
- Elevation: 336 m (1,102 ft)
- Highest elevation: 370 m (1,210 ft)
- Lowest elevation: 249 m (817 ft)
- Population (2023): 119
  - Density: 4.81/km^{2} (12.5/sq mi)
- Time zone: UTC+01:00 (CET)
  - Summer (DST): UTC+02:00 (CEST)
- INSEE/Postal code: 88291 /88410
- ^{1} French Land Register data, which excludes lakes, ponds, glaciers > 1 km^{2} (0.386 sq mi or 247 acres) and river estuaries.

Martinvelle (French pronunciation: [maʁtɛ̃vɛl]) is a commune in the Vosges department in Grand Est in northeastern France.

Inhabitants are called Martinvillois.

== Geography ==
The commune lies on the southwest of the Vôge Plateau and at the edge of the department, beside the adjacent Haute-Saône department. The northern part of the commune is within the Forest of Darney.

The village is 25 kilometres (16 mi) southeast of Contrexéville, 10 kilometres (6 mi) to the south-south-east of Monthureux-sur-Saône and 9 kilometres (6 mi) north of Corre.

The intersection of the 48th parallel north with the 6th meridian east lies within the commune.

== History ==
The village's history is more linked with that of the adjacent Franche-Comté than that of Lorraine. Until the French Revolution the lords of Passavant ruled here.

The coat of arms includes images of an oak leaf and of a mechanical hay rake, reflecting the importance here both of the forest and of agriculture, and recalling the factory that manufactured agricultural implements locally between 1860 and 1962.

== See also ==
- Communes of the Vosges department
