= Fignévelle =

- Commune
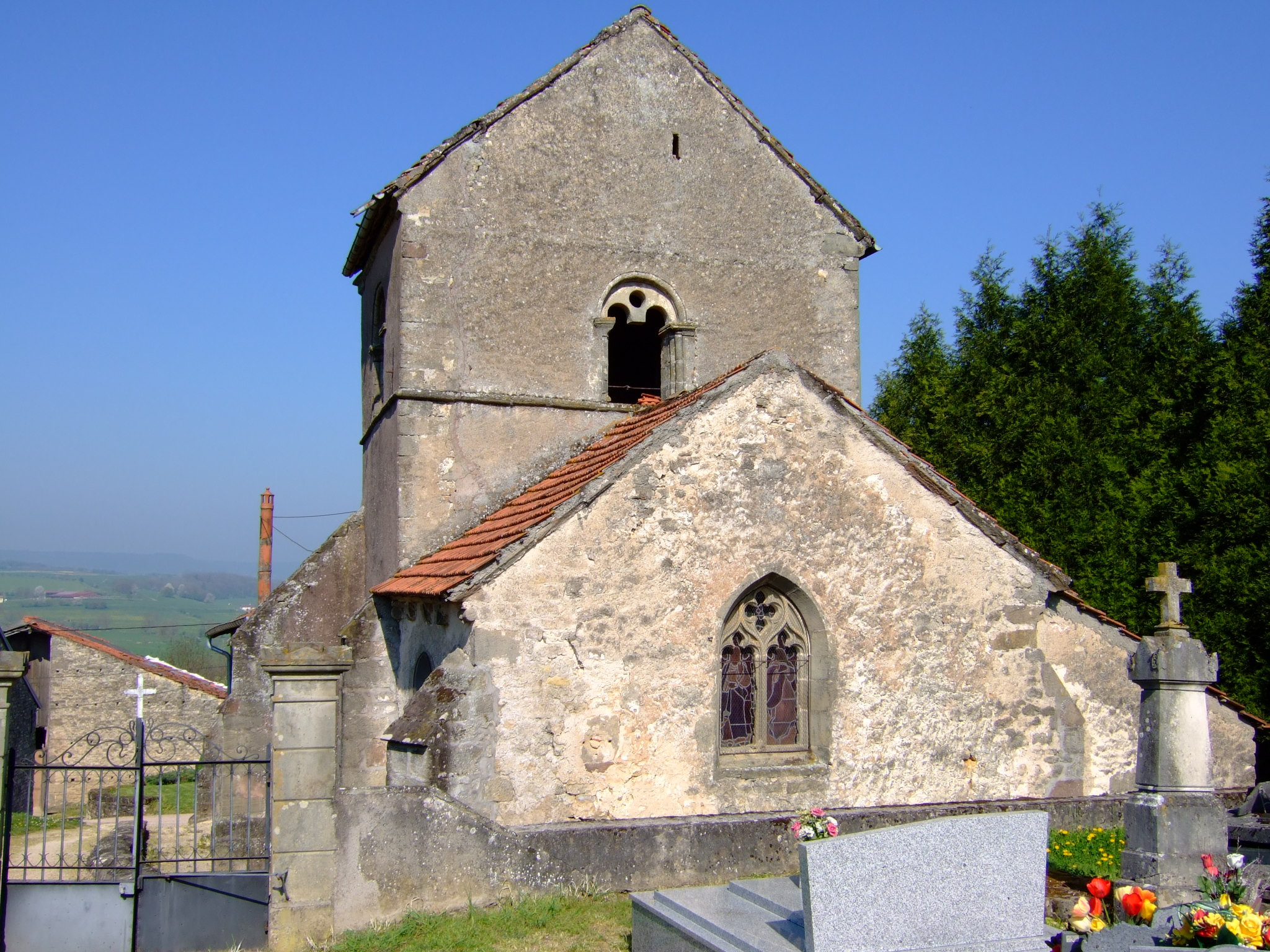
- The church in Fignévelle
- Location of Fignévelle
- Location within France Location within Grand Est
- Coordinates: 47°59′34″N 5°54′46″E
- Country: France
- Region: Grand Est
- Department: Vosges
- Arrondissement: Neufchâteau
- Canton: Darney
- Intercommunality: CC Vosges côté Sud-Ouest

Government
  - Mayor (2020–2026): Daniel Bernard
- Area^{1}: 4.4 km^{2} (1.7 sq mi)
- Elevation: 287 m (942 ft)
- Highest elevation: 339 m (1,112 ft)
- Lowest elevation: 234 m (768 ft)
- Population (2023): 50
  - Density: 11/km^{2} (29/sq mi)
- Time zone: UTC+01:00 (CET)
  - Summer (DST): UTC+02:00 (CEST)
- INSEE/Postal code: 88171 /88410
- ^{1} French Land Register data, which excludes lakes, ponds, glaciers > 1 km^{2} (0.386 sq mi or 247 acres) and river estuaries.

Fignévelle (French pronunciation: [fiɲevɛl]) is a commune in the Vosges department in Grand Est in northeastern France.

== See also ==
- Communes of the Vosges department
