= Belmont-lès-Darney =

- Commune
- Location of Belmont-lès-Darney
- Location within France Location within Grand Est
- Coordinates: 48°05′12″N 6°00′43″E
- Country: France
- Region: Grand Est
- Department: Vosges
- Arrondissement: Neufchâteau
- Canton: Darney
- Intercommunality: CC Vosges côté Sud-Ouest

Government
  - Mayor (2020–2026): Christian Adam
- Area^{1}: 3.99 km^{2} (1.54 sq mi)
- Highest elevation: 360 m (1,180 ft)
- Lowest elevation: 267 m (876 ft)
- Population (2023): 107
  - Density: 26.8/km^{2} (69.5/sq mi)
- Time zone: UTC+01:00 (CET)
  - Summer (DST): UTC+02:00 (CEST)
- INSEE/Postal code: 88049 /88260
- ^{1} French Land Register data, which excludes lakes, ponds, glaciers > 1 km^{2} (0.386 sq mi or 247 acres) and river estuaries.

Belmont-lès-Darney (French pronunciation: [bɛlmɔ̃ lɛ daʁnɛ], literally Belmont near Darney) is a commune in the Vosges department in Grand Est in northeastern France.

Its inhabitants are called Belmontais in French.

== See also ==
- Communes of the Vosges department
