= Sans-Vallois =

- Commune
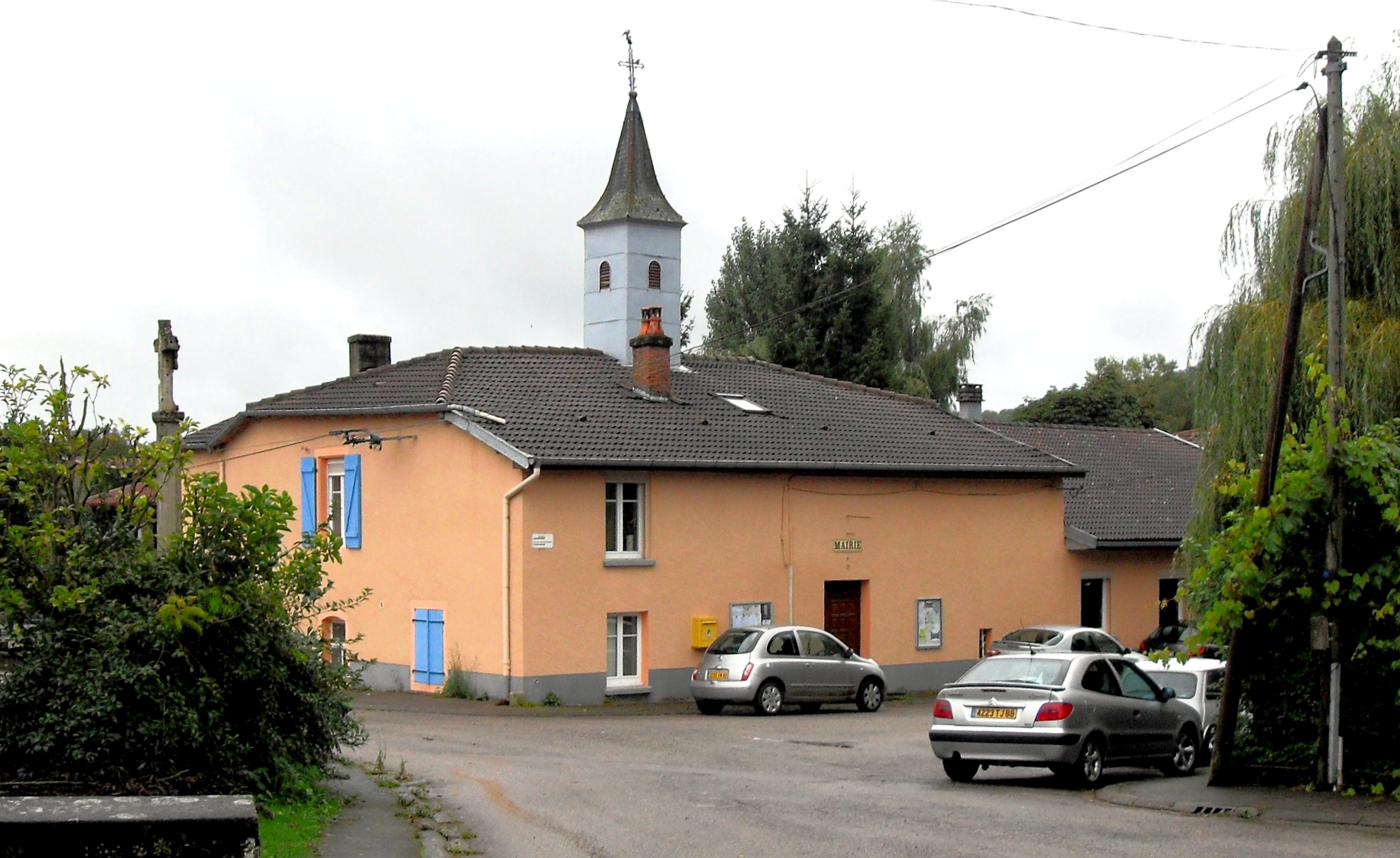
- The town hall in Sans-Vallois
- Location of Sans-Vallois
- Location within France Location within Grand Est
- Coordinates: 48°09′40″N 6°06′26″E
- Country: France
- Region: Grand Est
- Department: Vosges
- Arrondissement: Neufchâteau
- Canton: Darney
- Intercommunality: CC Vosges côté Sud-Ouest

Government
  - Mayor (2020–2026): Gérard Bogard
- Area^{1}: 4.43 km^{2} (1.71 sq mi)
- Highest elevation: 395 m (1,296 ft)
- Lowest elevation: 313 m (1,027 ft)
- Population (2023): 126
  - Density: 28.4/km^{2} (73.7/sq mi)
- Time zone: UTC+01:00 (CET)
  - Summer (DST): UTC+02:00 (CEST)
- INSEE/Postal code: 88441 /88260
- ^{1} French Land Register data, which excludes lakes, ponds, glaciers > 1 km^{2} (0.386 sq mi or 247 acres) and river estuaries.

Sans-Vallois (French pronunciation: [sɑ̃ valwa]) is a commune in the Vosges department in Grand Est in northeastern France.

== Demography ==
Historical population
Year	Pop.	±% p.a.
1968	71	—
1975	69	−0.41%
1982	82	+2.50%
1990	98	+2.25%
1999	105	+0.77%
2007	118	+1.47%
2012	122	+0.67%
2017	133	+1.74%
2023	126	−0.90%
Source: INSEE

== See also ==
- Communes of the Vosges department
