= Regnévelle =

- Commune
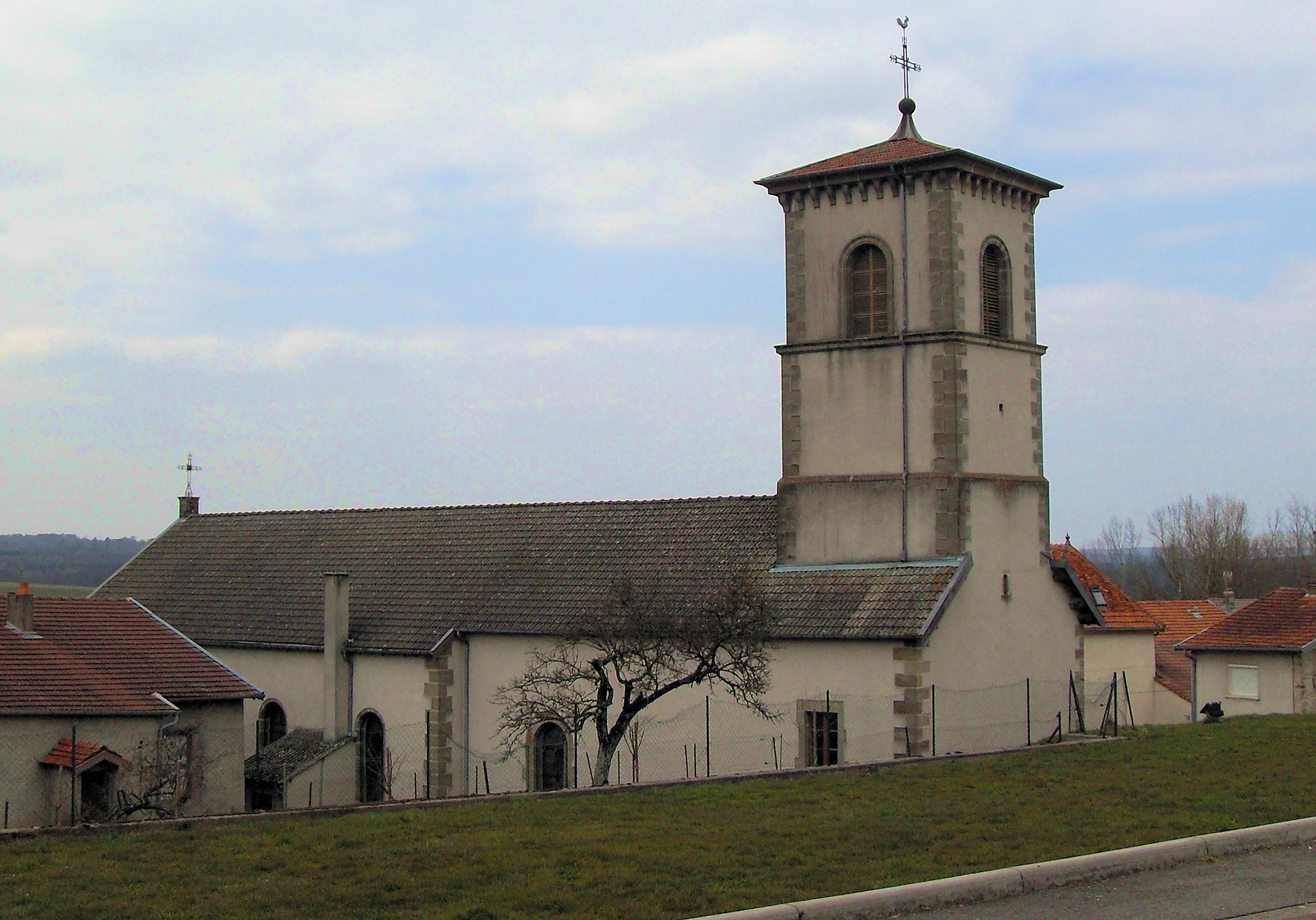
- The church in Regnévelle
- Location of Regnévelle
- Location within France Location within Grand Est
- Coordinates: 47°59′10″N 5°58′18″E
- Country: France
- Region: Grand Est
- Department: Vosges
- Arrondissement: Neufchâteau
- Canton: Darney
- Intercommunality: CC Vosges côté Sud-Ouest

Government
  - Mayor (2020–2026): Jacques Cottereau
- Area^{1}: 8.62 km^{2} (3.33 sq mi)
- Highest elevation: 366 m (1,201 ft)
- Lowest elevation: 254 m (833 ft)
- Population (2023): 122
  - Density: 14.2/km^{2} (36.7/sq mi)
- Time zone: UTC+01:00 (CET)
  - Summer (DST): UTC+02:00 (CEST)
- INSEE/Postal code: 88377 /88410
- ^{1} French Land Register data, which excludes lakes, ponds, glaciers > 1 km^{2} (0.386 sq mi or 247 acres) and river estuaries.

Regnévelle (French pronunciation: [ʁəɲevɛl]) is a commune in the Vosges department in Grand Est in northeastern France.

== See also ==
- Communes of the Vosges department
