= Godoncourt =

- Commune
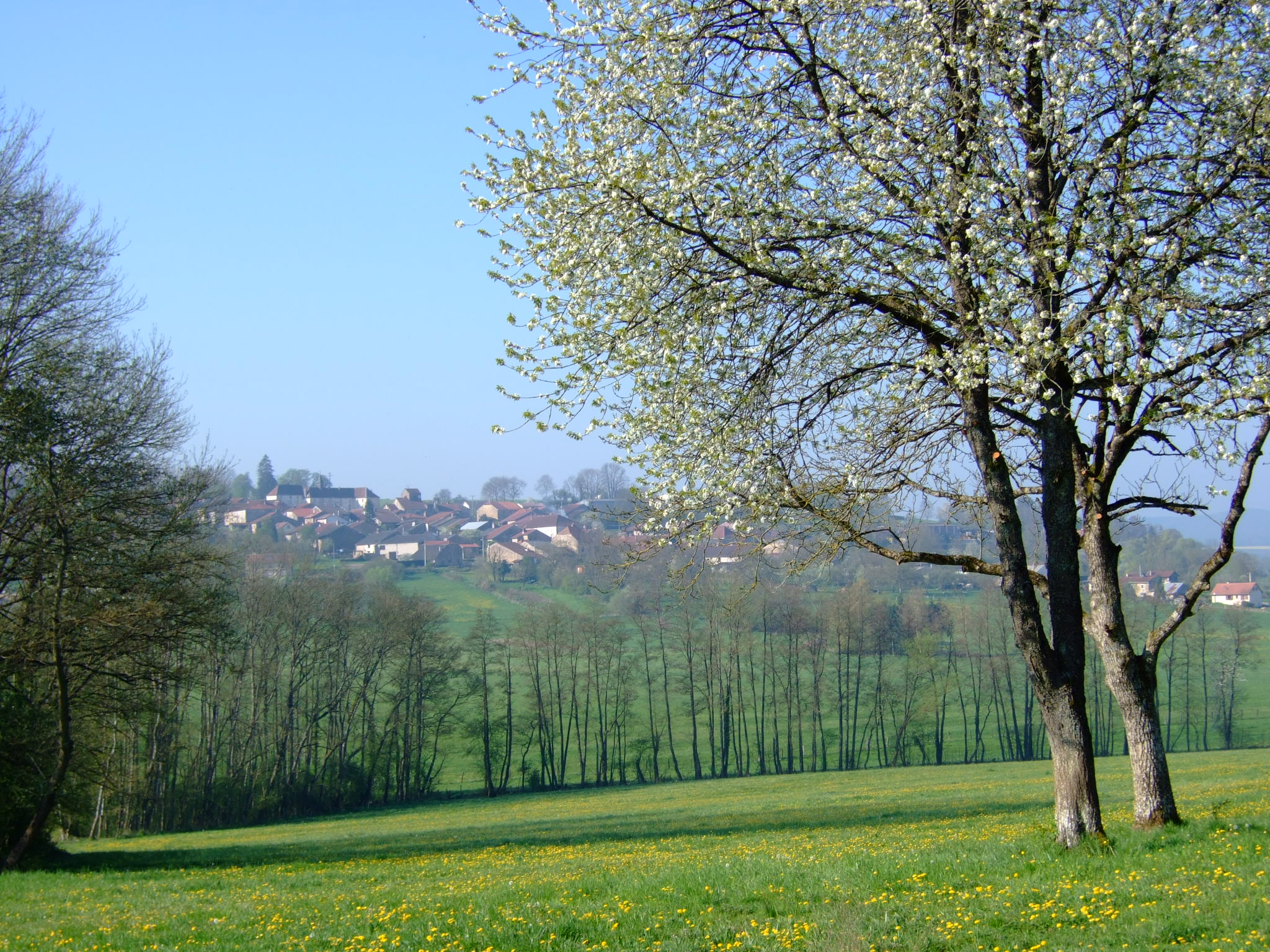
- A general view of Godoncourt
- Location of Godoncourt
- Location within France Location within Grand Est
- Coordinates: 48°00′00″N 5°55′21″E
- Country: France
- Region: Grand Est
- Department: Vosges
- Arrondissement: Neufchâteau
- Canton: Darney
- Intercommunality: CC Vosges côté Sud-Ouest

Government
  - Mayor (2020–2026): Jean-Luc Durieux
- Area^{1}: 11.38 km^{2} (4.39 sq mi)
- Elevation: 287 m (942 ft)
- Highest elevation: 362 m (1,188 ft)
- Lowest elevation: 234 m (768 ft)
- Population (2023): 117
  - Density: 10.3/km^{2} (26.6/sq mi)
- Time zone: UTC+01:00 (CET)
  - Summer (DST): UTC+02:00 (CEST)
- INSEE/Postal code: 88208 /88410
- ^{1} French Land Register data, which excludes lakes, ponds, glaciers > 1 km^{2} (0.386 sq mi or 247 acres) and river estuaries.

Godoncourt (French pronunciation: [ɡɔdɔ̃kuʁ]) is a commune in the Vosges department, Grand Est, Northeastern France. Until 1789, Godoncourt was a village of Franche-Comté. It was incorporated in the Vosges territory after 1789. During the Thirty Years' War, the village was burnt by Bernard of Saxe-Weimar's mercenaries and its burghers were killed. Bound to Jonvelle until mid 18th Century, Godoncourt welcomed the monks who started to found the Sainte Anne Hermitage in the 12th Century. The last hermits, who were from Saint Jean-Baptiste congregation from Besançon, lived in the hermitage until the 1760s. The hermitage became a private property after the sale of the Biens Nationaux.

== See also ==
- Communes of the Vosges department
