= Gignéville =

- Commune
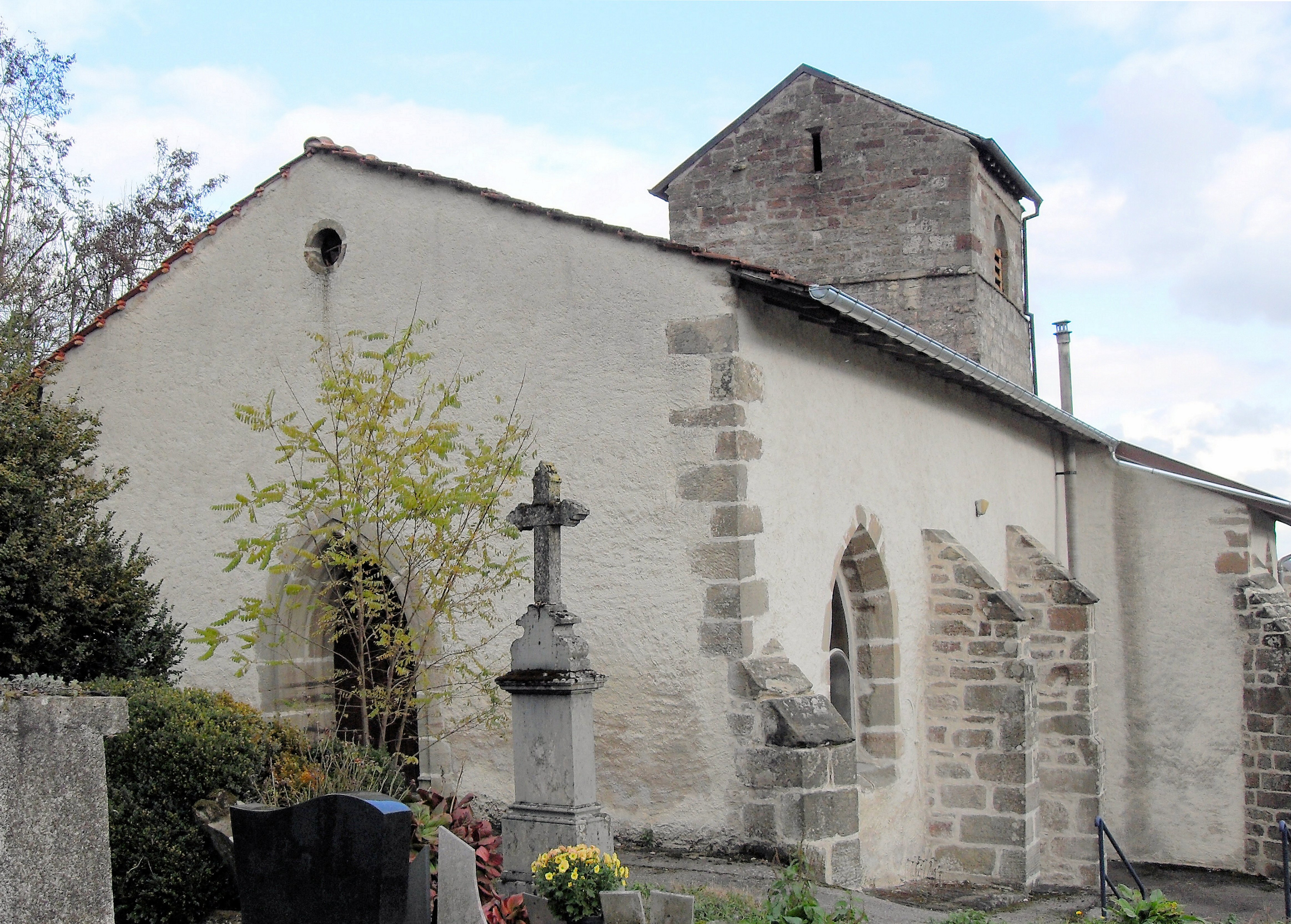
- The church in Gignéville
- Location of Gignéville
- Location within France Location within Grand Est
- Coordinates: 48°06′33″N 5°54′44″E
- Country: France
- Region: Grand Est
- Department: Vosges
- Arrondissement: Neufchâteau
- Canton: Darney
- Intercommunality: CC Vosges côté Sud-Ouest

Government
  - Mayor (2020–2026): Jean-Paul Chanaux
- Area^{1}: 5.58 km^{2} (2.15 sq mi)
- Elevation: 364 m (1,194 ft)
- Highest elevation: 434 m (1,424 ft)
- Lowest elevation: 294 m (965 ft)
- Population (2023): 77
  - Density: 14/km^{2} (36/sq mi)
- Time zone: UTC+01:00 (CET)
  - Summer (DST): UTC+02:00 (CEST)
- INSEE/Postal code: 88199 /88320
- ^{1} French Land Register data, which excludes lakes, ponds, glaciers > 1 km^{2} (0.386 sq mi or 247 acres) and river estuaries.

Gignéville (French pronunciation: [ʒiɲevil]) is a commune in the Vosges department in Grand Est in northeastern France.

== See also ==
- Communes of the Vosges department
