= Bleurville =

- Commune
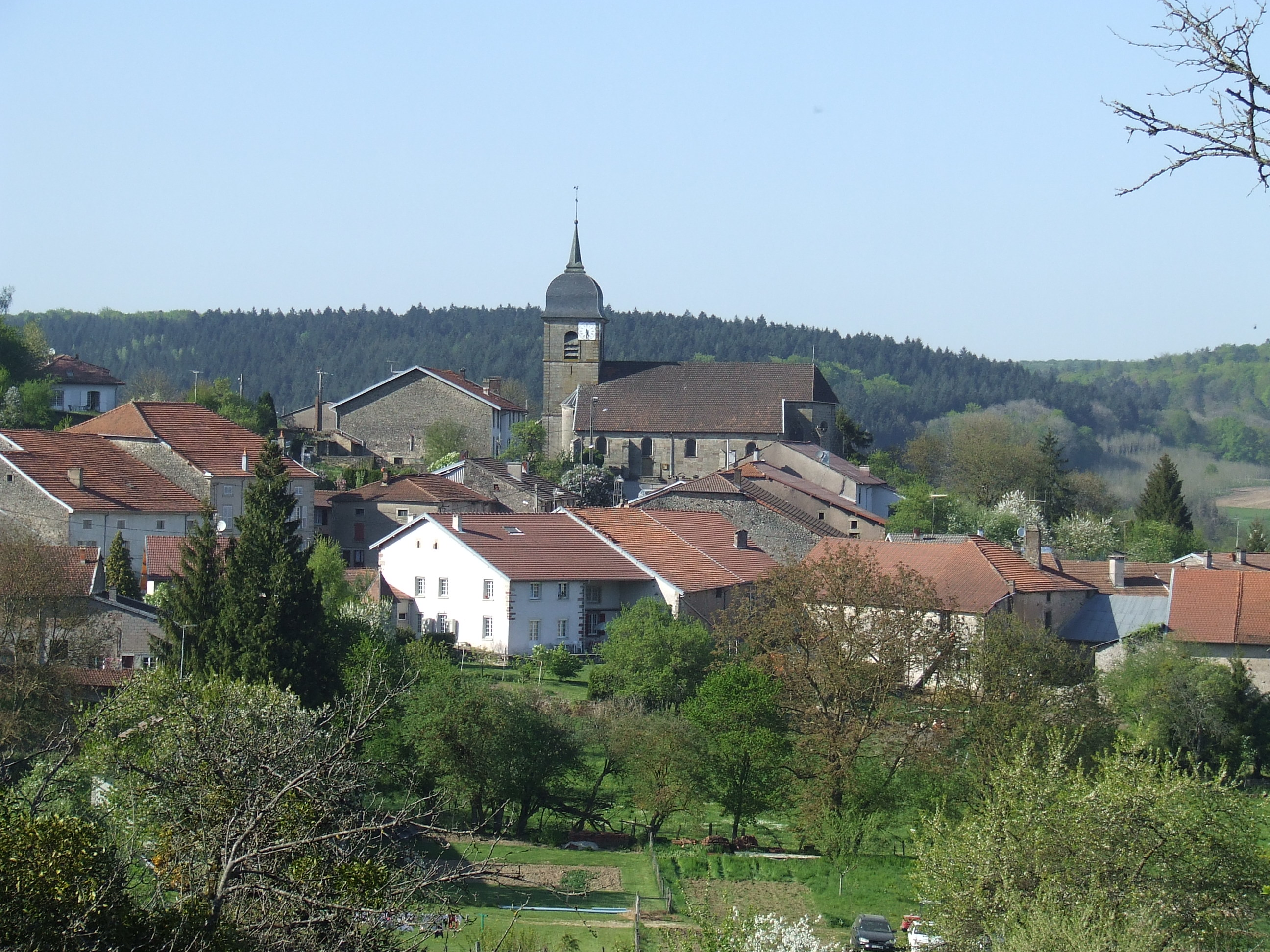
- A general view of Bleurville

- Coat of arms
- Location of Bleurville
- Location within France Location within Grand Est
- Coordinates: 48°03′41″N 5°57′50″E
- Country: France
- Region: Grand Est
- Department: Vosges
- Arrondissement: Neufchâteau
- Canton: Darney
- Intercommunality: CC Vosges côté Sud-Ouest

Government
  - Mayor (2023–2026): Xavier Granget
- Area^{1}: 20.25 km^{2} (7.82 sq mi)
- Highest elevation: 383 m (1,257 ft)
- Lowest elevation: 248 m (814 ft)
- Population (2023): 281
  - Density: 13.9/km^{2} (35.9/sq mi)
- Time zone: UTC+01:00 (CET)
  - Summer (DST): UTC+02:00 (CEST)
- INSEE/Postal code: 88061 /88410
- ^{1} French Land Register data, which excludes lakes, ponds, glaciers > 1 km^{2} (0.386 sq mi or 247 acres) and river estuaries.

Bleurville (French pronunciation: [blœʁvil]) is a commune in the Vosges department in Grand Est in northeastern France.

== See also ==
- Communes of the Vosges department
