= Viviers-le-Gras =

- Commune
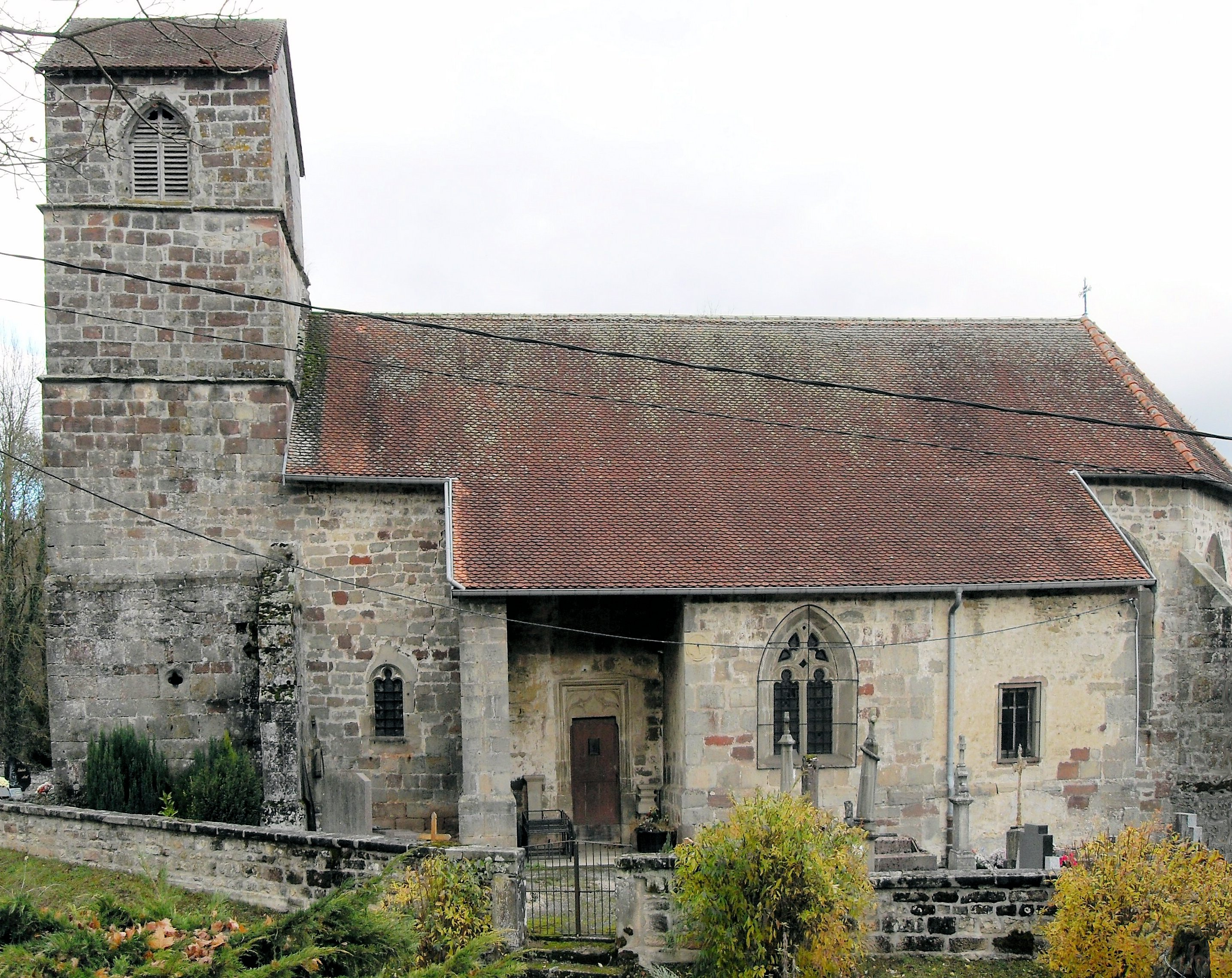
- The church in Viviers-le-Gras
- Location of Viviers-le-Gras
- Location within France Location within Grand Est
- Coordinates: 48°07′33″N 5°56′27″E
- Country: France
- Region: Grand Est
- Department: Vosges
- Arrondissement: Neufchâteau
- Canton: Darney
- Intercommunality: Vosges Côté Sud-Ouest

Government
  - Mayor (2020–2026): Jacques Lemarquis
- Area^{1}: 9.04 km^{2} (3.49 sq mi)
- Elevation: 36 m (118 ft)
- Highest elevation: 455 m (1,493 ft)
- Lowest elevation: 293 m (961 ft)
- Population (2023): 181
  - Density: 20.0/km^{2} (51.9/sq mi)
- Time zone: UTC+01:00 (CET)
  - Summer (DST): UTC+02:00 (CEST)
- INSEE/Postal code: 88517 /88260
- ^{1} French Land Register data, which excludes lakes, ponds, glaciers > 1 km^{2} (0.386 sq mi or 247 acres) and river estuaries.

Viviers-le-Gras (French pronunciation: [vivje lə ɡʁa]) is a commune in the Vosges department in Grand Est in northeastern France.

== See also ==
- Communes of the Vosges department
