= Claudon =

- Commune
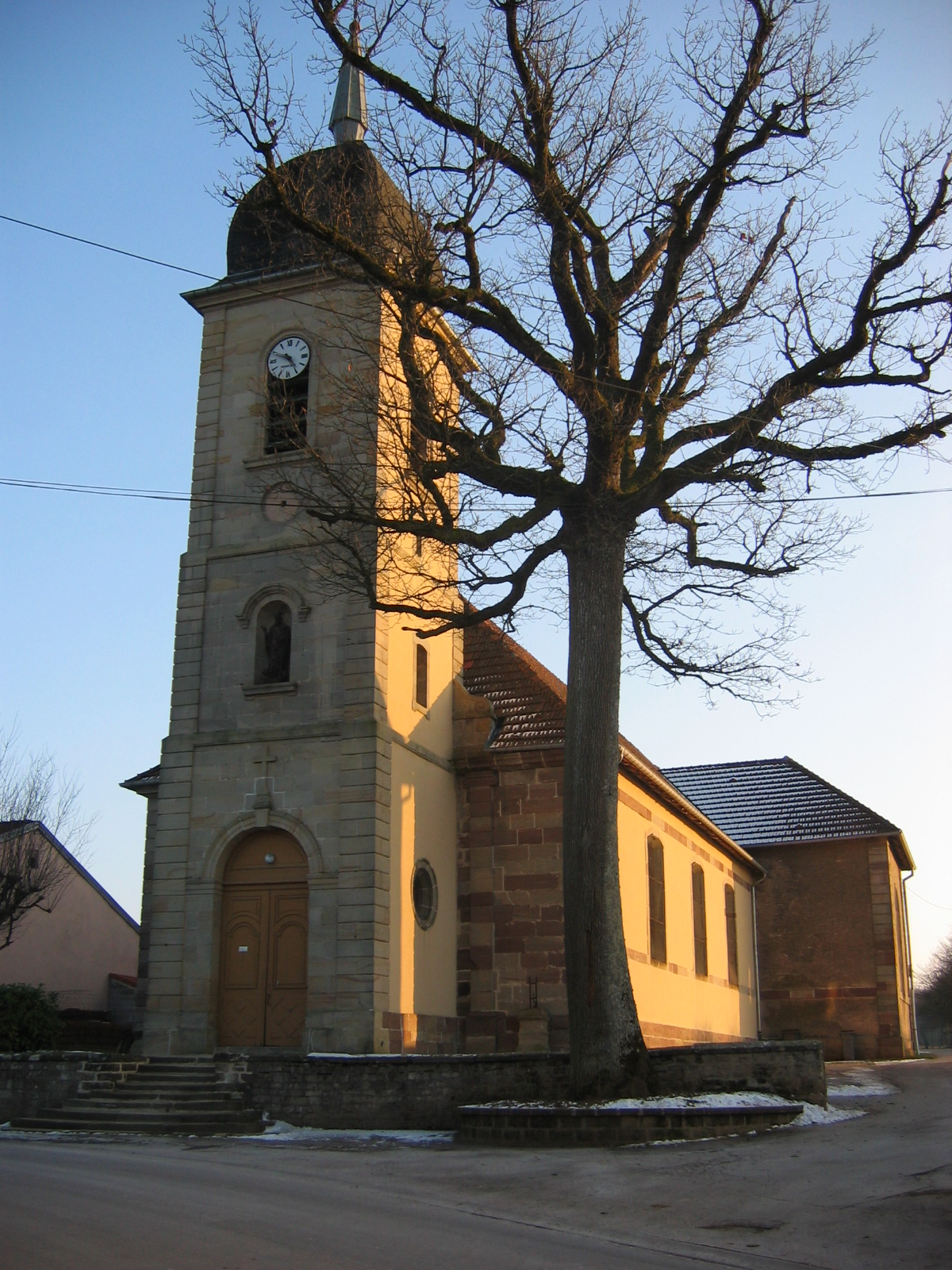
- Sts Guérin

- Coat of arms
- Location of Claudon
- Location within France Location within Grand Est
- Coordinates: 48°02′01″N 6°02′11″E
- Country: France
- Region: Grand Est
- Department: Vosges
- Arrondissement: Neufchâteau
- Canton: Darney
- Intercommunality: CC Vosges côté Sud-Ouest

Government
  - Mayor (2020–2026): Alain Roussel
- Area^{1}: 21.72 km^{2} (8.39 sq mi)
- Elevation: 358 m (1,175 ft)
- Highest elevation: 404 m (1,325 ft)
- Lowest elevation: 248 m (814 ft)
- Population (2023): 218
  - Density: 10.0/km^{2} (26.0/sq mi)
- Time zone: UTC+01:00 (CET)
  - Summer (DST): UTC+02:00 (CEST)
- INSEE/Postal code: 88105 /88410
- ^{1} French Land Register data, which excludes lakes, ponds, glaciers > 1 km^{2} (0.386 sq mi or 247 acres) and river estuaries.

Claudon (French pronunciation: [klodɔ̃]) is a commune in the Vosges department in Grand Est in northeastern France.

== See also ==
- Communes of the Vosges department
