= Ameuvelle =

- Commune
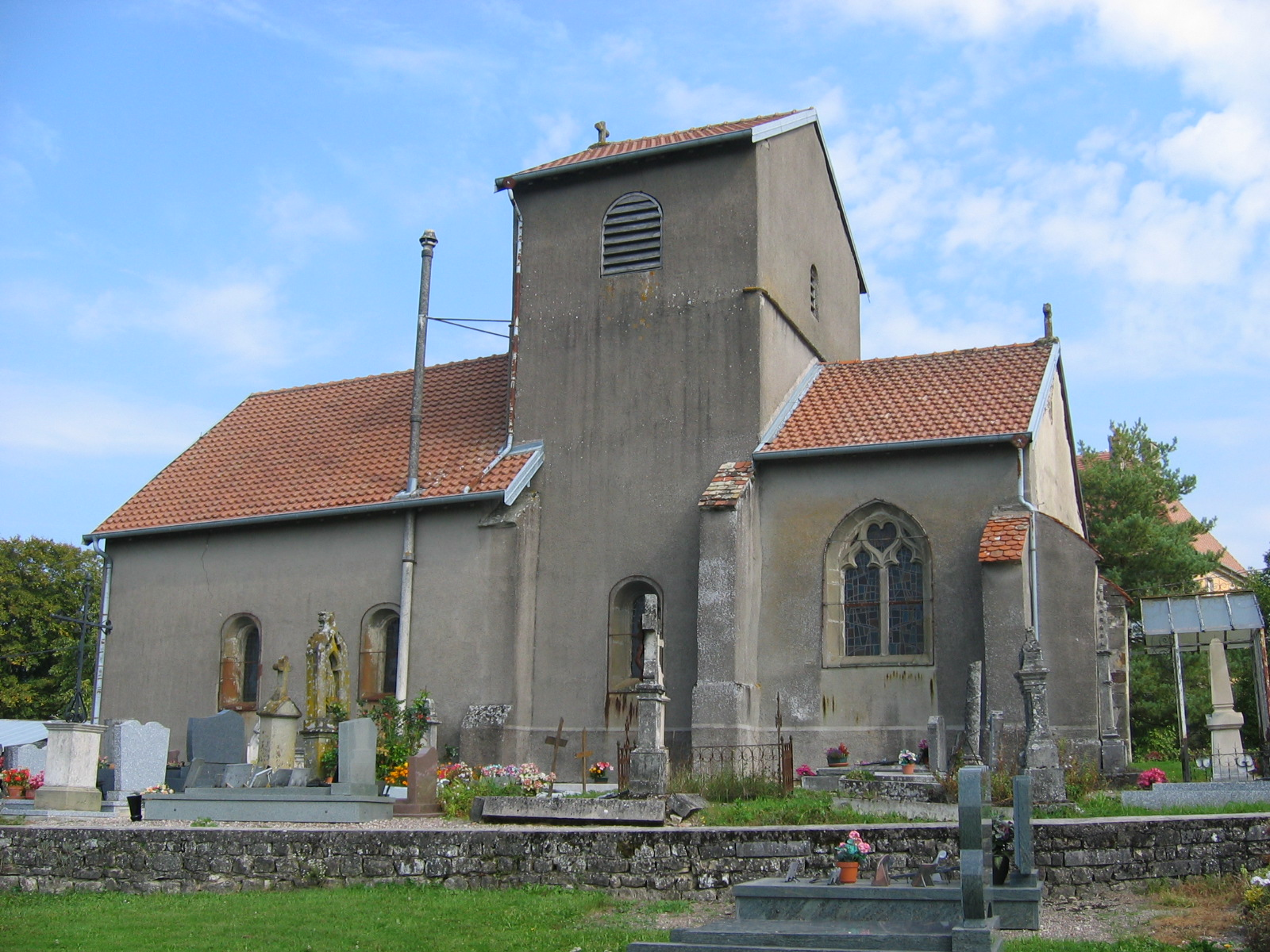
- The church in Ameuvelle
- Location of Ameuvelle
- Location within France Location within Grand Est
- Coordinates: 47°56′36″N 5°56′48″E
- Country: France
- Region: Grand Est
- Department: Vosges
- Arrondissement: Neufchâteau
- Canton: Darney
- Intercommunality: CC Vosges côté Sud-Ouest

Government
  - Mayor (2020–2026): Pascal Nicolas
- Area^{1}: 5.56 km^{2} (2.15 sq mi)
- Highest elevation: 307 m (1,007 ft)
- Lowest elevation: 238 m (781 ft)
- Population (2023): 46
  - Density: 8.3/km^{2} (21/sq mi)
- Time zone: UTC+01:00 (CET)
  - Summer (DST): UTC+02:00 (CEST)
- INSEE/Postal code: 88007 /88410
- ^{1} French Land Register data, which excludes lakes, ponds, glaciers > 1 km^{2} (0.386 sq mi or 247 acres) and river estuaries.

Ameuvelle (French pronunciation: [amøvɛl]) is a commune in the Vosges department in Grand Est in northeastern France.

== See also ==
- Communes of the Vosges department
