= Monthureux-sur-Saône =

- Commune
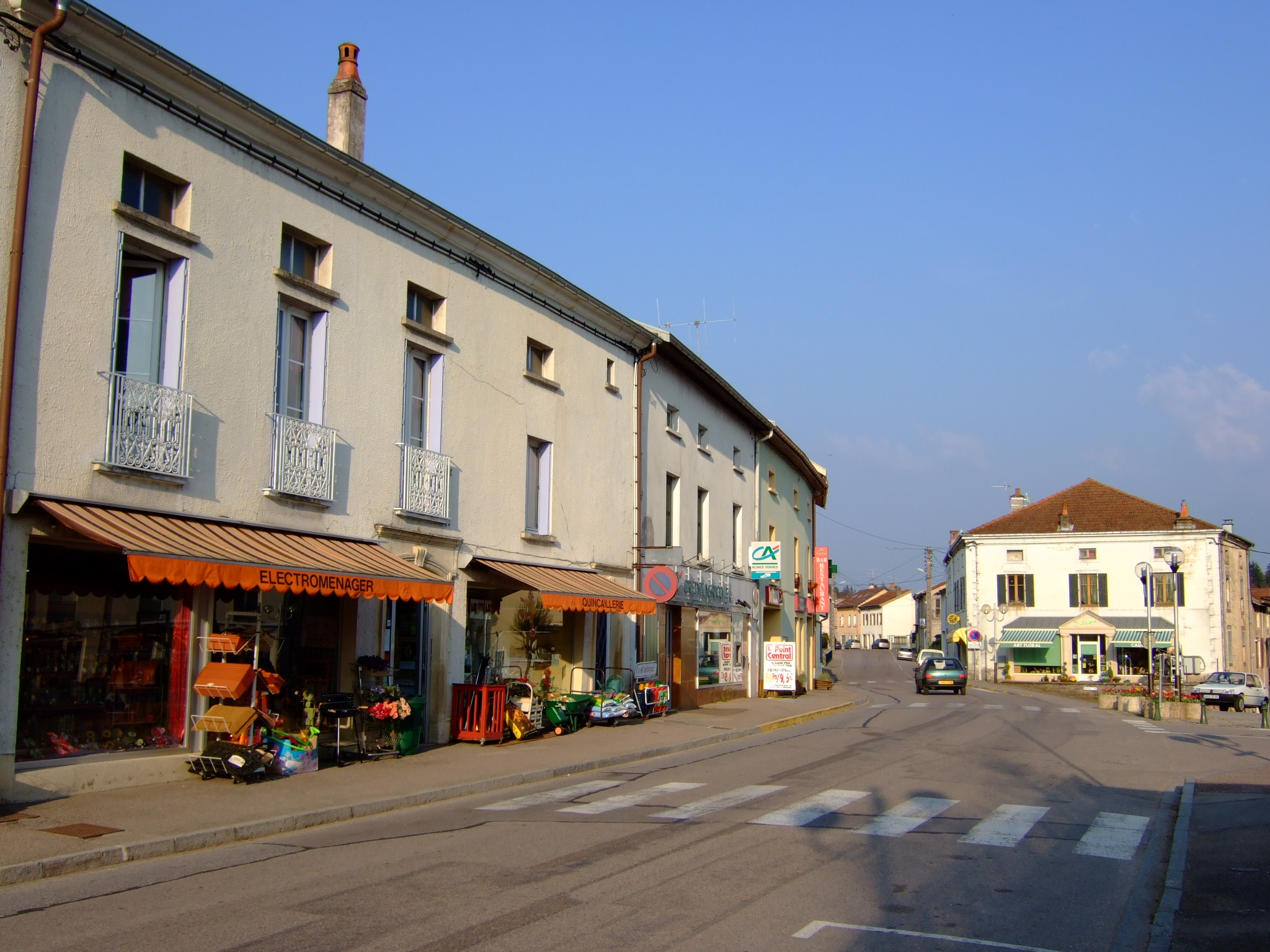
- The centre of Monthureux-sur-Saône

- Coat of arms
- Location of Monthureux-sur-Saône
- Location within France Location within Grand Est
- Coordinates: 48°01′50″N 5°58′23″E
- Country: France
- Region: Grand Est
- Department: Vosges
- Arrondissement: Neufchâteau
- Canton: Darney
- Intercommunality: CC Vosges côté Sud-Ouest

Government
  - Mayor (2020–2026): Pierre Sylvestre
- Area^{1}: 19.02 km^{2} (7.34 sq mi)
- Elevation: 253 m (830 ft)
- Highest elevation: 339 m (1,112 ft)
- Lowest elevation: 238 m (781 ft)
- Population (2023): 857
  - Density: 45.1/km^{2} (117/sq mi)
- Time zone: UTC+01:00 (CET)
  - Summer (DST): UTC+02:00 (CEST)
- INSEE/Postal code: 88310 /88410
- ^{1} French Land Register data, which excludes lakes, ponds, glaciers > 1 km^{2} (0.386 sq mi or 247 acres) and river estuaries.

Monthureux-sur-Saône (French pronunciation: [mɔ̃tyʁø syʁ son]) or Monthureux-on-the-Saône is a commune near the Saône River in the Vosges department in Grand Est in northeastern France.

In French, its inhabitants are called Monthurolais.

== Name ==
The French name Monthureux-sur-Saône ("Monthureux-on-Saône") distinguishes this town from Monthureux-le-Sec in France's Vosges Department. Monthureux itself derives from Medieval Latin Monasteriolum ("little monastery"), the etymon of many other French towns known as Montreuil. Monthureux was also known as Montreuil (along with Monstreuil, Montreux, and Montureux) until the 17th century. The present name apparently derives from a clerical error in a 1628 transcription of the name as Montheureux.

== History ==
=== Antiquity ===
The origins of the little town are uncertain. The area was settled before the Roman conquest of Gaul, probably by the Lingons who had their capital at Langres and occupied the territory in this area all the way to modern Haute-Saône and the Forest of Darney (Forêt de Darney).

Under Roman rule, the site of the present city was on the military road connecting Langres to Baccarat. A Gallo-Roman cemetery from that era has been found nearby but, during the turbulent aftermath of Frankish and Burgundian conquest of the area, the site currently occupied by Monthureux-sur-Saône was probably abandoned to the forest.

=== Medieval ===
A "little monastery" (monasteriolum) is attested at the end of the 9th century and may have been established during the Carolingian period. The current church positioned on the site of the old monastery was completely rebuilt in the sixteenth century, but some traces of the eleventh-century arches survive on the exterior of the building on its north side. Of the priory itself, just two massive pillars survive, at the foot of an old stone staircase leading to the old cemetery.

The settlement around the monastery or church was known as Monstreuil by the 14th century and was the location of a minor fortification.

=== Personalities ===
1. Charles Levy (1805-1872), born at Monthureux-sur-Saône, registered a patent for a nail manufacturing machine that improved the production process. A street at Bains-les-Bains is named after him.
2. Charles Godard (1827-1899), born at Monthureux-sur-Saône, was an architect who worked for the diocese of Langres and a prodigious builder of churches in the area.

== See also ==
- Communes of the Vosges department
