= Les Vallois =

- Commune
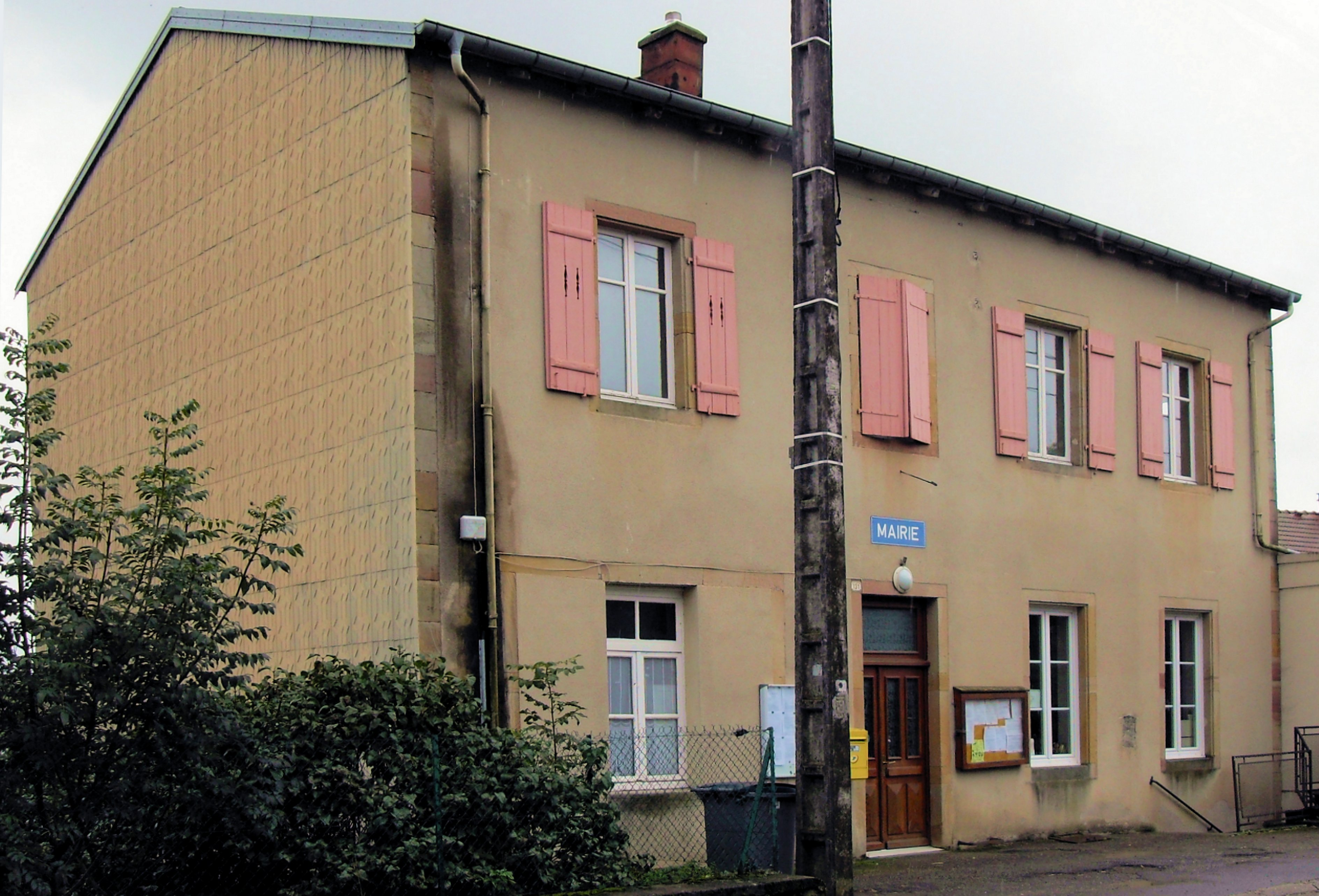
- The town hall in Les Vallois
- Location of Les Vallois
- Location within France Location within Grand Est
- Coordinates: 48°09′32″N 6°07′05″E
- Country: France
- Region: Grand Est
- Department: Vosges
- Arrondissement: Neufchâteau
- Canton: Darney
- Intercommunality: CC Vosges côté Sud-Ouest

Government
  - Mayor (2020–2026): Jean-Claude Didelot
- Area^{1}: 5.25 km^{2} (2.03 sq mi)
- Highest elevation: 393 m (1,289 ft)
- Lowest elevation: 296 m (971 ft)
- Population (2023): 128
  - Density: 24.4/km^{2} (63.1/sq mi)
- Time zone: UTC+01:00 (CET)
  - Summer (DST): UTC+02:00 (CEST)
- INSEE/Postal code: 88491 /88260
- ^{1} French Land Register data, which excludes lakes, ponds, glaciers > 1 km^{2} (0.386 sq mi or 247 acres) and river estuaries.

Les Vallois (French pronunciation: [le valwa]) is a commune in the Vosges department in Grand Est in northeastern France.

== Geography ==
The river Madon flows along the commune.

== Demography ==
Historical population
Year	Pop.	±% p.a.
1968	122	—
1975	114	−0.96%
1982	100	−1.85%
1990	95	−0.64%
1999	95	+0.00%
2007	104	+1.14%
2012	121	+3.07%
2017	118	−0.50%
2023	128	+1.36%
Source: INSEE

== See also ==
- Communes of the Vosges department
