= Nonville, Vosges =

Nonville
- Commune
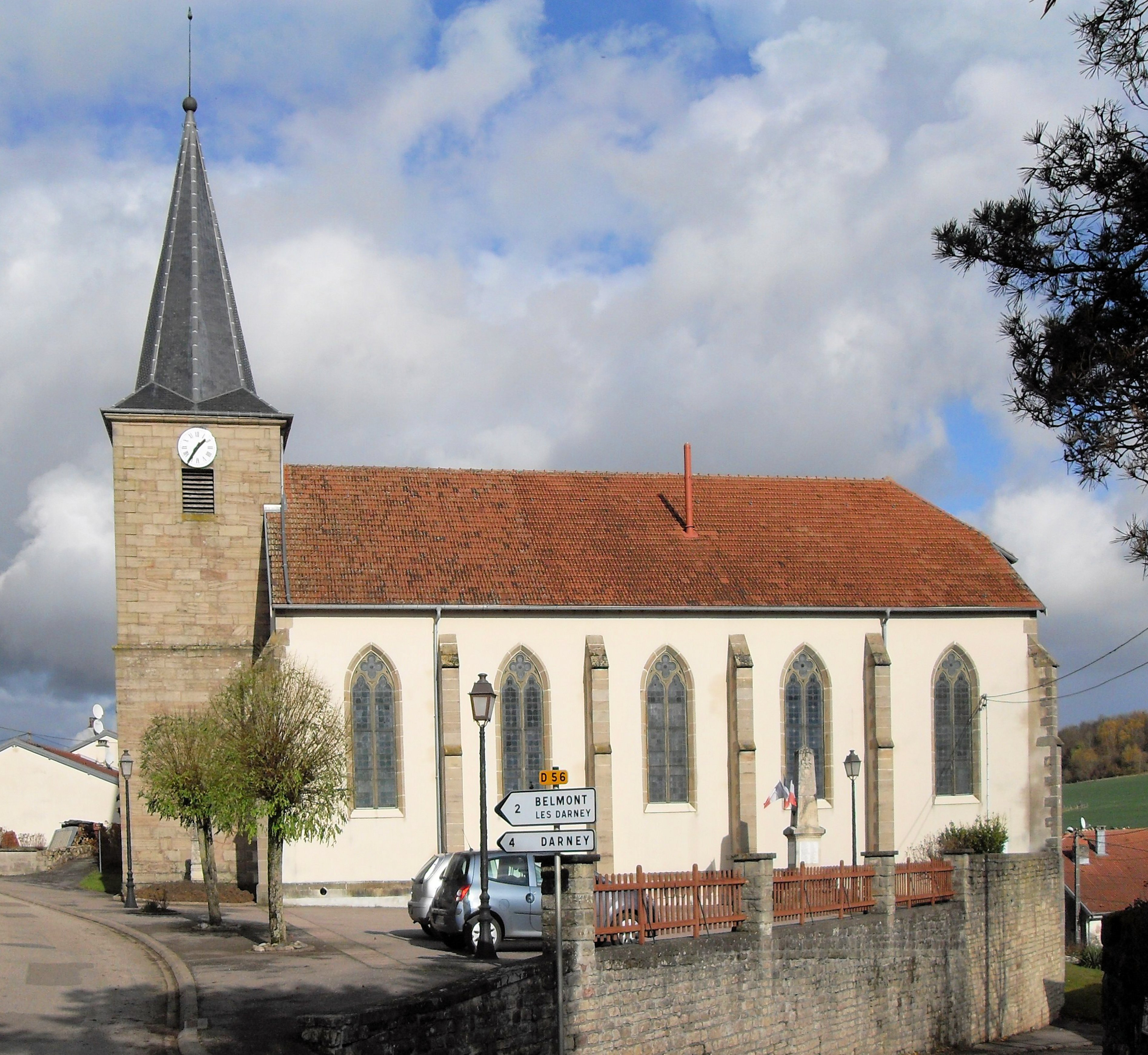
- The church in Nonville
- Location of Nonville
- Location within France Location within Grand Est
- Coordinates: 48°04′53″N 5°59′27″E
- Country: France
- Region: Grand Est
- Department: Vosges
- Arrondissement: Neufchâteau
- Canton: Darney
- Intercommunality: CC Vosges côté Sud-Ouest

Government
  - Mayor (2020–2026): Maurice Hatier
- Area^{1}: 8.91 km^{2} (3.44 sq mi)
- Elevation: 310 m (1,020 ft)
- Highest elevation: 401 m (1,316 ft)
- Lowest elevation: 269 m (883 ft)
- Population (2023): 185
  - Density: 20.8/km^{2} (53.8/sq mi)
- Time zone: UTC+01:00 (CET)
  - Summer (DST): UTC+02:00 (CEST)
- INSEE/Postal code: 88330 /88260
- ^{1} French Land Register data, which excludes lakes, ponds, glaciers > 1 km^{2} (0.386 sq mi or 247 acres) and river estuaries.

Nonville (French pronunciation: [nɔ̃vil]) is a commune in the Vosges department in Grand Est in northeastern France.

== See also ==
- Communes of the Vosges department
