= Ormes =

Ormes may refer to:

- communes in France:
  - Ormes, Aube
  - Ormes, Eure
  - Ormes, Loiret
  - Ormes, Marne
  - Ormes, Saône-et-Loire
  - Ormes-et-Ville, Meurthe-et-Moselle
  - Les Ormes, Vienne
  - Les Ormes, Yonne
- collectively, the Great Orme and Little Orme, two limestone headlands in Llandudno, Wales, UK

== See also ==
- Orme (disambiguation)
- Orm (disambiguation)
- Orme (name)
- Orme's Law
