= Orme =

Orme may refer to:

== Places ==
=== United Kingdom ===
- Great Orme and Little Orme, two headlands overlooking Llandudno Bay in Wales

=== United States ===
- Orme, Maryland, an unincorporated community in Prince George's County
- Orme, Tennessee, a town in Marion County
- The Orme School of Arizona, a private school in Mayer, Arizona

=== Quebec (Canada) ===
- Rivière aux Ormes, in Lotbinière Regional County Municipality, Chaudière-Appalaches
- Rivière à l'Orme, a tributary of lac des Deux Montagnes on Montreal Island

== Other uses ==
- Orme (name), with a list of people named Orme
- Orme's Law, a rule for assessing power requirements for radio controlled models
- Le Orme, an Italian progressive rock band
- Orme (horse), a Thoroughbred racehorse

== See also ==
- Orm (disambiguation)
- Ormes (disambiguation)
- Guernsey Elm
