= Maroncourt =

- Commune
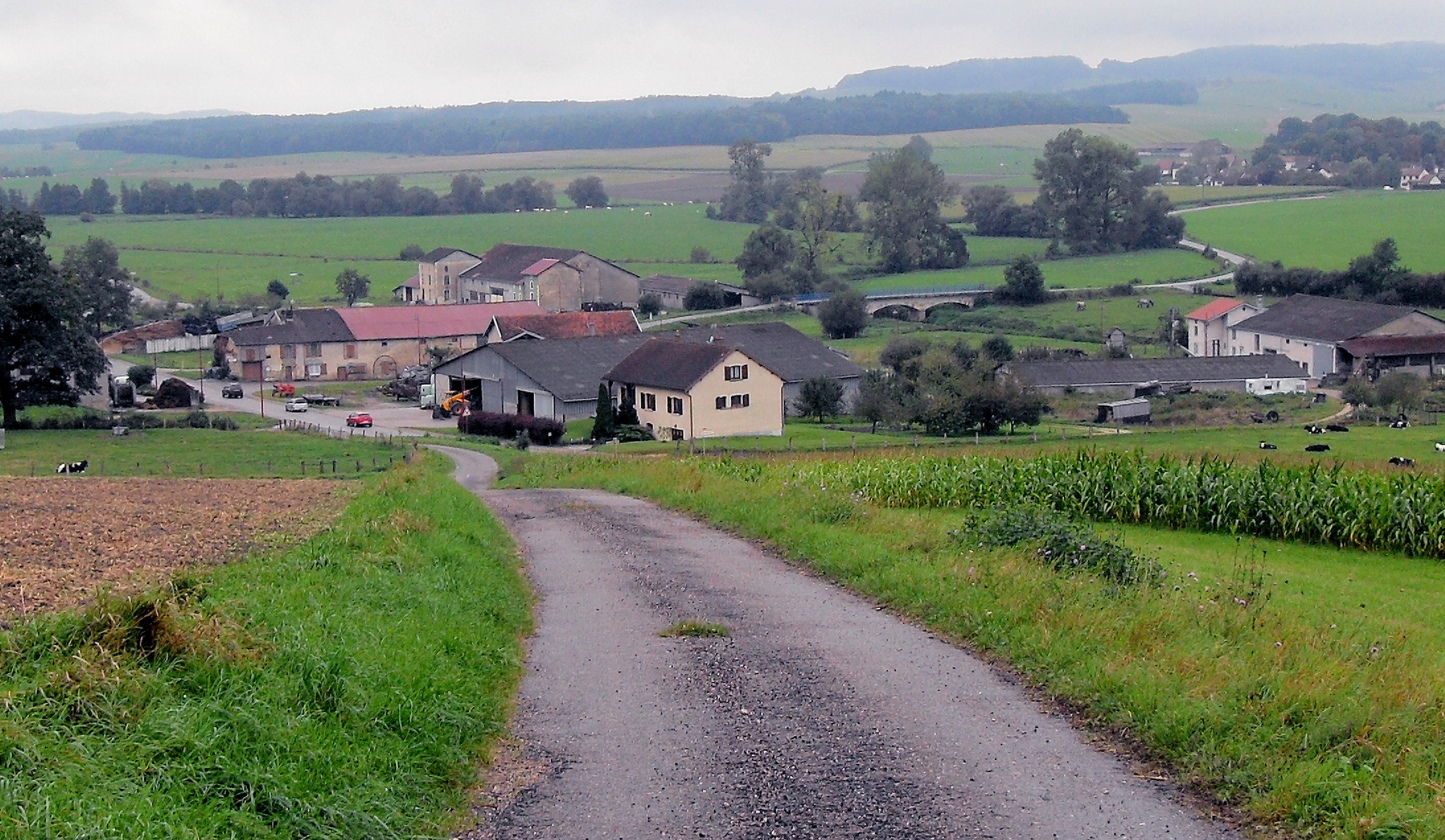
- A general view of Maroncourt
- Location of Maroncourt
- Location within France Location within Grand Est
- Coordinates: 48°14′59″N 6°09′25″E
- Country: France
- Region: Grand Est
- Department: Vosges
- Arrondissement: Neufchâteau
- Canton: Darney
- Intercommunality: Mirecourt Dompaire

Government
  - Mayor (2020–2026): Kevin Brégeot
- Area^{1}: 2.24 km^{2} (0.86 sq mi)
- Elevation: 280 m (920 ft)
- Highest elevation: 338 m (1,109 ft)
- Lowest elevation: 276 m (906 ft)
- Population (2023): 5
  - Density: 2.2/km^{2} (5.8/sq mi)
- Time zone: UTC+01:00 (CET)
  - Summer (DST): UTC+02:00 (CEST)
- INSEE/Postal code: 88288 /88270
- ^{1} French Land Register data, which excludes lakes, ponds, glaciers > 1 km^{2} (0.386 sq mi or 247 acres) and river estuaries.

Maroncourt (French pronunciation: [maʁɔ̃kuʁ]) is a commune in the Vosges department in Grand Est in northeastern France.

== Geography ==
Located a few kilometres to the south of Mirecourt and roughly fifteen kilometres (nine miles) to the west-north-west of Épinal, Maroncourt is the least populous commune in the department. It has no church, but falls within the parish of Hymont to the north.

Forest covers 71 of the commune's 224 hectares: the rest is devoted to agriculture.

The river Madon flows through the commune.

== History ==
An early mention dates from 1159, when a charter addressed by the Bishop of Toul, Henry of Lorraine to the Abbey of Chaumousey confirms the gift of title to the Abbey of Maroncourt (Moiruncourt) made by Foulques of Saint-Vast and his wife Mélisende. The lands were still held by Chaumousey following a territorial consolidation that took place in 1595.

== Population ==
Historical population
Year	Pop.	±% p.a.
1968	23	—
1975	21	−1.29%
1982	12	−7.68%
1990	16	+3.66%
1999	13	−2.28%
2007	11	−2.07%
2012	11	+0.00%
2017	9	−3.93%
2023	5	−9.33%
Source: INSEE

== See also ==
- Communes of the Vosges department
