= Vaudigny =

- Commune
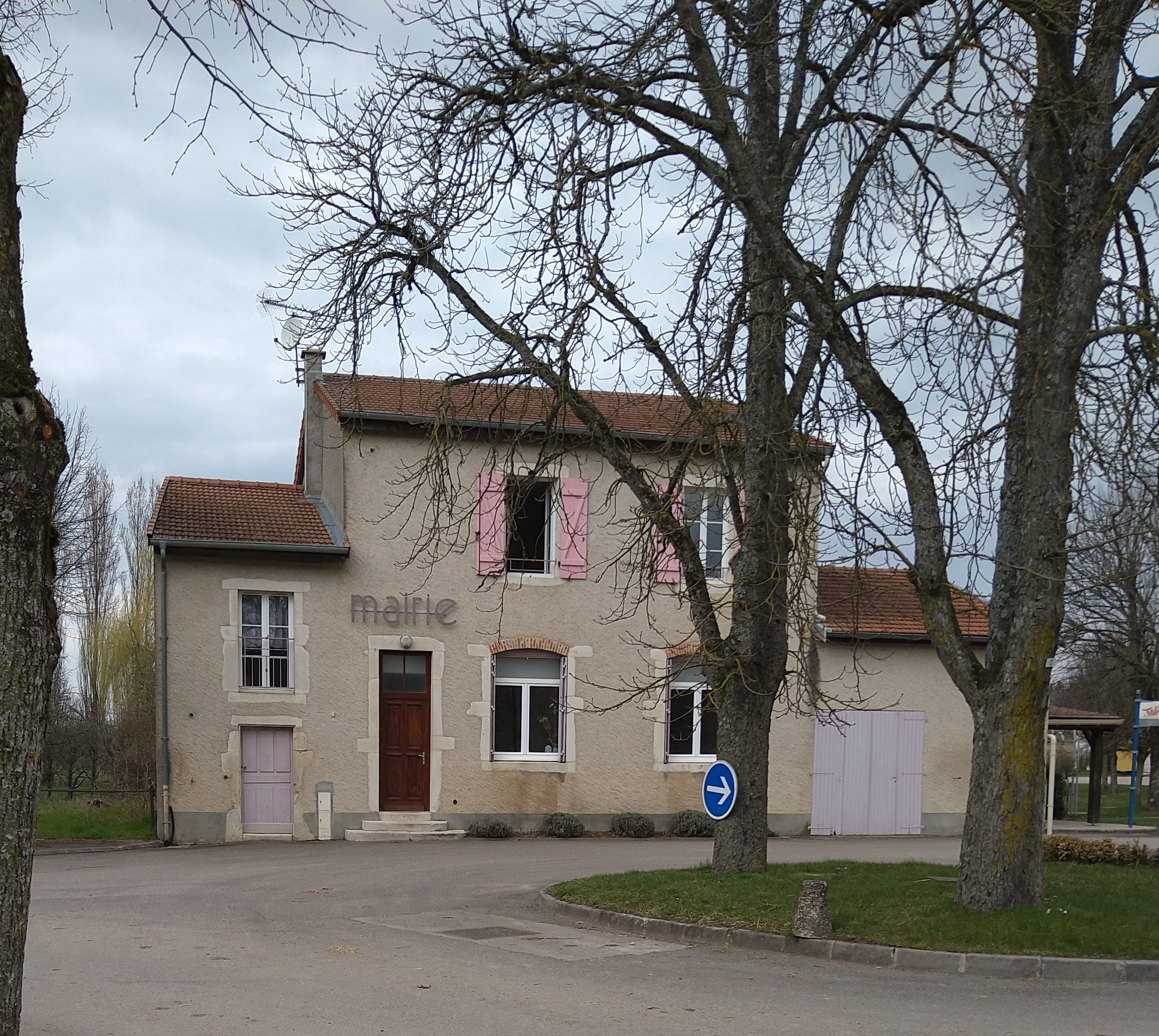
- Town hall

- Coat of arms
- Location of Vaudigny
- Location within France Location within Grand Est
- Coordinates: 48°26′20″N 6°11′58″E
- Country: France
- Region: Grand Est
- Department: Meurthe-et-Moselle
- Arrondissement: Nancy
- Canton: Meine au Saintois
- Intercommunality: CC Pays du Saintois

Government
  - Mayor (2020–2026): François Toussaint-Noviant
- Area^{1}: 3.94 km^{2} (1.52 sq mi)
- Elevation: 305 m (1,001 ft)
- Highest elevation: 364 m (1,194 ft)
- Lowest elevation: 239 m (784 ft)
- Population (2023): 84
  - Density: 21/km^{2} (55/sq mi)
- Time zone: UTC+01:00 (CET)
  - Summer (DST): UTC+02:00 (CEST)
- INSEE/Postal code: 54554 /54740
- ^{1} French Land Register data, which excludes lakes, ponds, glaciers > 1 km^{2} (0.386 sq mi or 247 acres) and river estuaries.

Vaudigny (French pronunciation: [vodiɲi]) is a commune in the Meurthe-et-Moselle department in north-eastern France.

== Geography ==
The river Madon flows through the commune.

== History ==
In 1987, the communes of Vaudigny and Ormes-et-Ville were created from the commune Les Mesnils-sur-Madon, which took the name Crantenoy.

== See also ==
- Communes of the Meurthe-et-Moselle department
