= Gerbécourt-et-Haplemont =

- Commune
- Coat of arms
- Location of Gerbécourt-et-Haplemont
- Location within France Location within Grand Est
- Coordinates: 48°29′24″N 6°09′50″E
- Country: France
- Region: Grand Est
- Department: Meurthe-et-Moselle
- Arrondissement: Nancy
- Canton: Meine au Saintois

Government
  - Mayor (2020–2026): Franck Ogier
- Area^{1}: 5.26 km^{2} (2.03 sq mi)
- Elevation: 238 m (781 ft)
- Highest elevation: 298 m (978 ft)
- Lowest elevation: 234 m (768 ft)
- Population (2023): 248
  - Density: 47.1/km^{2} (122/sq mi)
- Time zone: UTC+01:00 (CET)
  - Summer (DST): UTC+02:00 (CEST)
- INSEE/Postal code: 54221 /54740
- ^{1} French Land Register data, which excludes lakes, ponds, glaciers > 1 km^{2} (0.386 sq mi or 247 acres) and river estuaries.

Gerbécourt-et-Haplemont (French pronunciation: [ʒɛʁbekuʁ e apləmɔ̃]) is a commune in the Meurthe-et-Moselle department in north-eastern France.

== Geography ==
The river Madon flows through the commune.

== See also ==
- Communes of the Meurthe-et-Moselle department
