= Affracourt =

- Commune
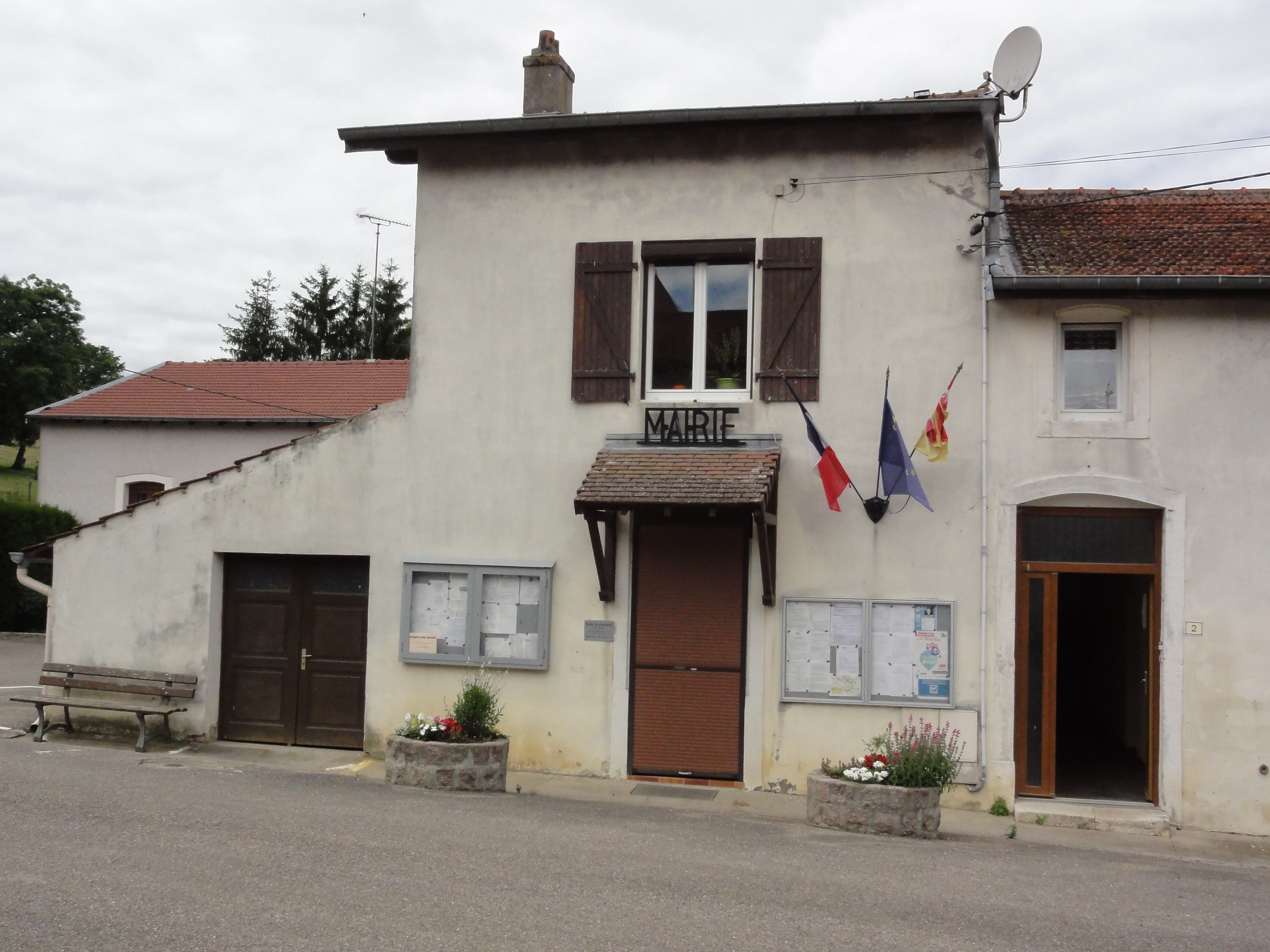
- The town hall in Affracourt

- Coat of arms
- Location of Affracourt
- Location within France Location within Grand Est
- Coordinates: 48°27′44″N 6°10′15″E
- Country: France
- Region: Grand Est
- Department: Meurthe-et-Moselle
- Arrondissement: Nancy
- Canton: Meine au Saintois
- Intercommunality: Pays du Saintois

Government
  - Mayor (2020–2026): Étienne Voinot
- Area^{1}: 5.56 km^{2} (2.15 sq mi)
- Elevation: 258 m (846 ft)
- Highest elevation: 327 m (1,073 ft)
- Lowest elevation: 239 m (784 ft)
- Population (2023): 113
  - Density: 20.3/km^{2} (52.6/sq mi)
- Time zone: UTC+01:00 (CET)
  - Summer (DST): UTC+02:00 (CEST)
- INSEE/Postal code: 54005 /54740
- ^{1} French Land Register data, which excludes lakes, ponds, glaciers > 1 km^{2} (0.386 sq mi or 247 acres) and river estuaries.

Affracourt (French pronunciation: [afʁakuʁ]) is a commune in the Meurthe-et-Moselle department in northeastern France.

== Geography ==
The river Madon flows through the commune.

== Population ==
Inhabitants are called Affracurtiens in French.

Historical population
Year	Pop.	±% p.a.
1968	93	—
1975	90	−0.47%
1982	106	+2.37%
1990	117	+1.24%
1999	114	−0.29%
2007	101	−1.50%
2012	108	+1.35%
2017	110	+0.37%
2023	113	+0.45%
Source: INSEE

== See also ==
- Communes of the Meurthe-et-Moselle department
