= Xeuilley =

- Commune
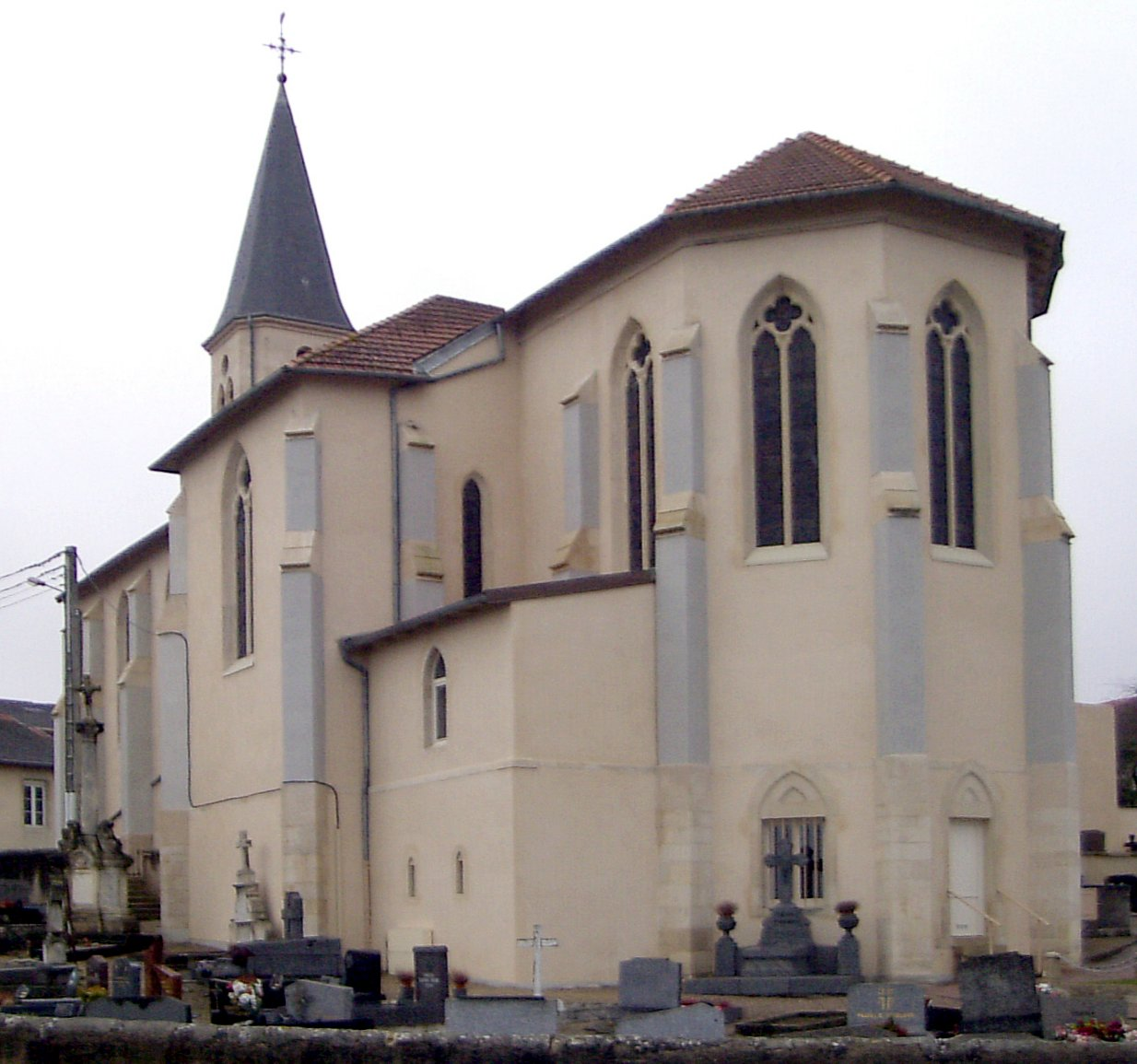
- The church in Xeuilley

- Coat of arms
- Location of Xeuilley
- Location within France Location within Grand Est
- Coordinates: 48°34′02″N 6°05′57″E
- Country: France
- Region: Grand Est
- Department: Meurthe-et-Moselle
- Arrondissement: Nancy
- Canton: Meine au Saintois
- Intercommunality: Moselle et Madon

Government
  - Mayor (2020–2026): Jean-Luc Fontaine
- Area^{1}: 7.37 km^{2} (2.85 sq mi)
- Elevation: 226 m (741 ft)
- Highest elevation: 281 m (922 ft)
- Lowest elevation: 222 m (728 ft)
- Population (2023): 959
  - Density: 130/km^{2} (337/sq mi)
- Time zone: UTC+01:00 (CET)
  - Summer (DST): UTC+02:00 (CEST)
- INSEE/Postal code: 54596 /54990
- ^{1} French Land Register data, which excludes lakes, ponds, glaciers > 1 km^{2} (0.386 sq mi or 247 acres) and river estuaries.

Xeuilley (French pronunciation: [ɡzœjɛ]) is a commune in the Meurthe-et-Moselle department in north-eastern France.

Jacques Callot's family owned property in Xeuilley, and he depicted it in some of his work.

== Population ==
Historical population
Year	Pop.	±% p.a.
1968	736	—
1975	647	−1.82%
1982	693	+0.99%
1990	779	+1.47%
1999	755	−0.35%
2007	765	+0.16%
2012	770	+0.13%
2017	934	+3.94%
2023	959	+0.44%
Source: INSEE

== Geography ==
The Madon forms most of the commune's eastern border.

== See also ==
- Communes of the Meurthe-et-Moselle department
