= Pont-lès-Bonfays =

- Commune
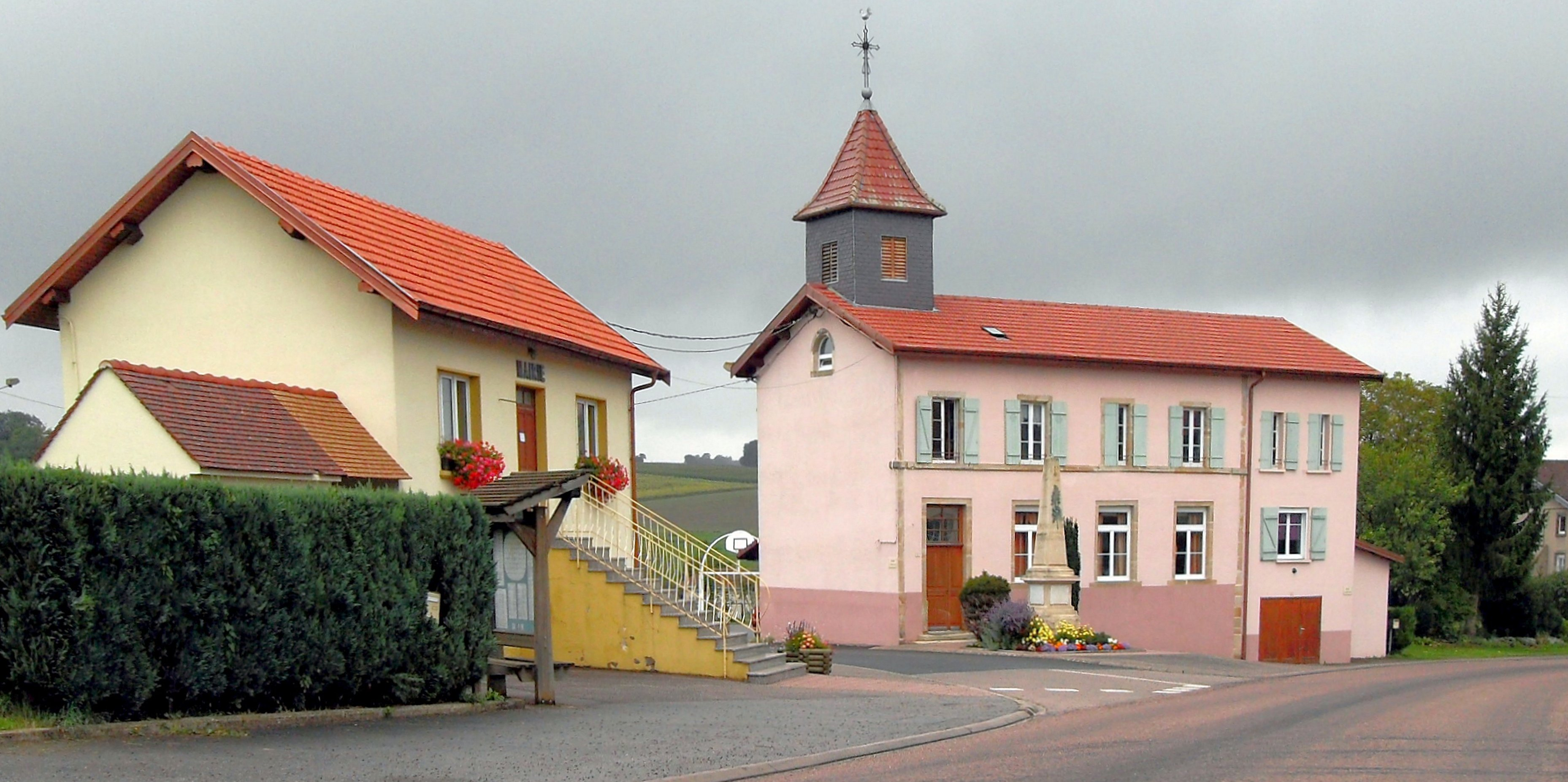
- The town hall in Pont-lès-Bonfays
- Location of Pont-lès-Bonfays
- Location within France Location within Grand Est
- Coordinates: 48°10′11″N 6°08′01″E
- Country: France
- Region: Grand Est
- Department: Vosges
- Arrondissement: Neufchâteau
- Canton: Darney
- Intercommunality: CC Vosges côté Sud-Ouest

Government
  - Mayor (2020–2026): Jacques Lalloz
- Area^{1}: 4.47 km^{2} (1.73 sq mi)
- Elevation: 300 m (980 ft)
- Highest elevation: 377 m (1,237 ft)
- Lowest elevation: 292 m (958 ft)
- Population (2023): 100
  - Density: 22/km^{2} (58/sq mi)
- Time zone: UTC+01:00 (CET)
  - Summer (DST): UTC+02:00 (CEST)
- INSEE/Postal code: 88353 /88260
- ^{1} French Land Register data, which excludes lakes, ponds, glaciers > 1 km^{2} (0.386 sq mi or 247 acres) and river estuaries.

Pont-lès-Bonfays (French pronunciation: [pɔ̃ lɛ bɔ̃fɛj]) is a commune in the Vosges department in Grand Est in northeastern France.

== Geography ==
The upper reaches of the river Madon flow through the commune.

== See also ==
- Communes of the Vosges department
