= Lemainville =

- Commune
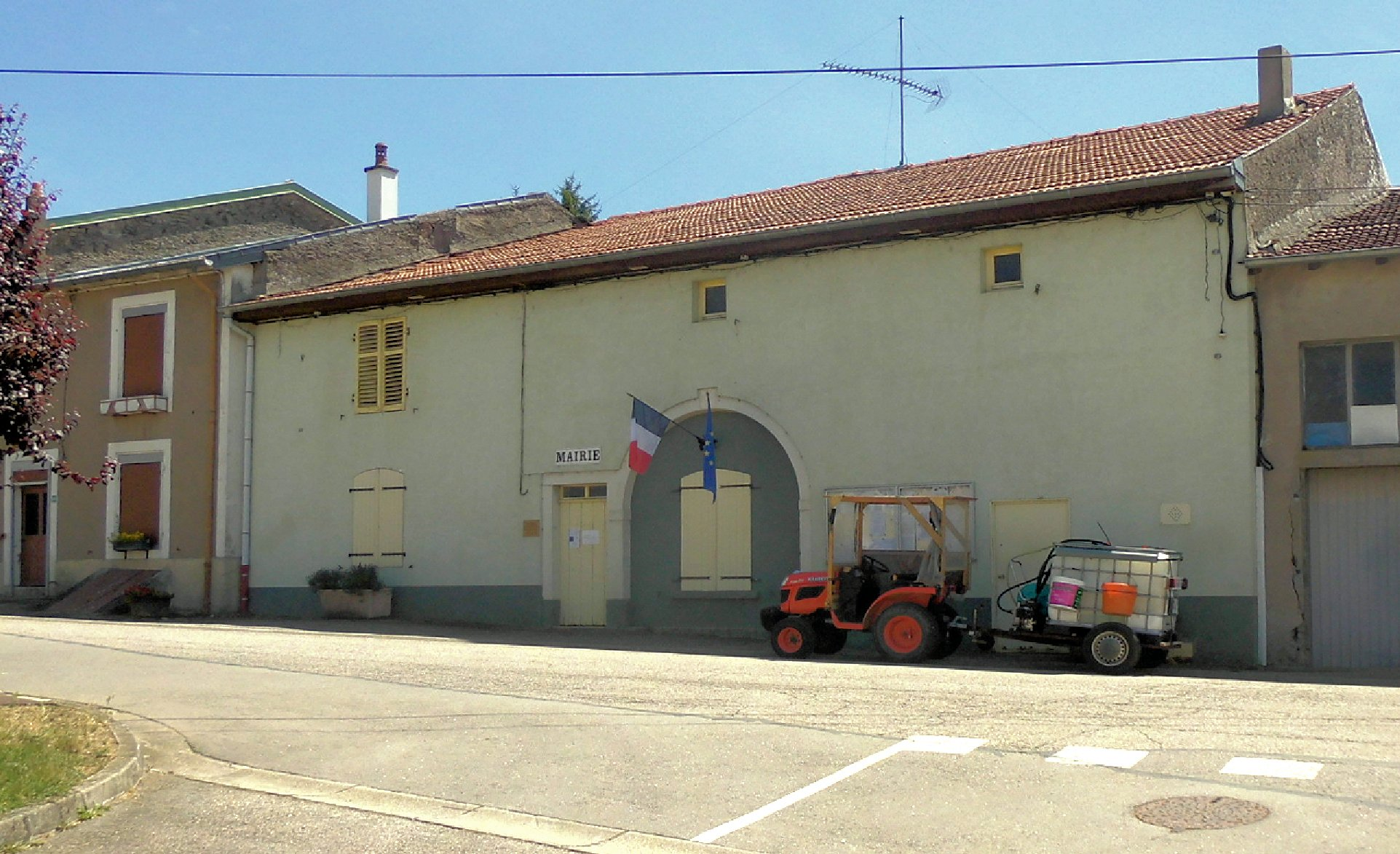
- The town hall in Lemainville

- Coat of arms
- Location of Lemainville
- Location within France Location within Grand Est
- Coordinates: 48°30′16″N 6°12′00″E
- Country: France
- Region: Grand Est
- Department: Meurthe-et-Moselle
- Arrondissement: Nancy
- Canton: Meine au Saintois
- Intercommunality: CC Pays du Saintois

Government
  - Mayor (2020–2026): Sébastien Daviller
- Area^{1}: 4.75 km^{2} (1.83 sq mi)
- Elevation: 239 m (784 ft)
- Highest elevation: 298 m (978 ft)
- Lowest elevation: 232 m (761 ft)
- Population (2023): 407
  - Density: 85.7/km^{2} (222/sq mi)
- Time zone: UTC+01:00 (CET)
  - Summer (DST): UTC+02:00 (CEST)
- INSEE/Postal code: 54309 /54740
- ^{1} French Land Register data, which excludes lakes, ponds, glaciers > 1 km^{2} (0.386 sq mi or 247 acres) and river estuaries.

Lemainville (French pronunciation: [ləmɛ̃vil]) is a commune in the Meurthe-et-Moselle department in north-eastern France.

== Geography ==
The river Madon flows through the commune.

== See also ==
- Communes of the Meurthe-et-Moselle department
