= Bralleville =

- Commune
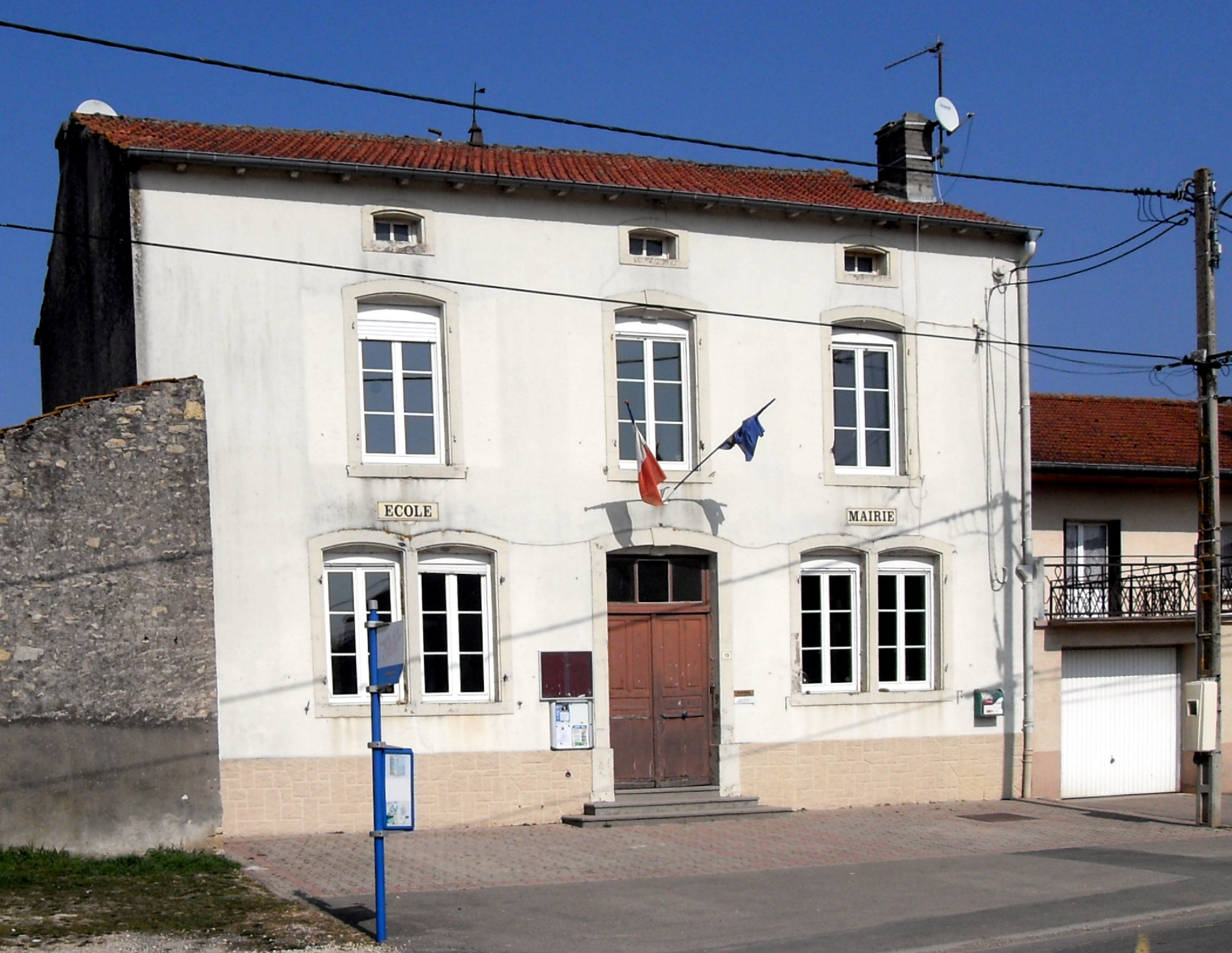
- The town hall in Bralleville

- Coat of arms
- Location of Bralleville
- Location within France Location within Grand Est
- Coordinates: 48°24′19″N 6°11′30″E
- Country: France
- Region: Grand Est
- Department: Meurthe-et-Moselle
- Arrondissement: Nancy
- Canton: Meine au Saintois

Government
  - Mayor (2020–2026): Bruno Chiaravalli
- Area^{1}: 4.39 km^{2} (1.69 sq mi)
- Elevation: 250 m (820 ft)
- Highest elevation: 351 m (1,152 ft)
- Lowest elevation: 247 m (810 ft)
- Population (2023): 171
  - Density: 39.0/km^{2} (101/sq mi)
- Time zone: UTC+01:00 (CET)
  - Summer (DST): UTC+02:00 (CEST)
- INSEE/Postal code: 54094 /54740
- ^{1} French Land Register data, which excludes lakes, ponds, glaciers > 1 km^{2} (0.386 sq mi or 247 acres) and river estuaries.

Bralleville (French pronunciation: [bʁalvil]) is a commune in the Meurthe-et-Moselle department in northeastern France.

== Geography ==
The river Madon flows through the commune.

== Population ==
Historical population
Year	Pop.	±% p.a.
1968	127	—
1975	127	+0.00%
1982	122	−0.57%
1990	157	+3.20%
1999	163	+0.42%
2007	170	+0.53%
2012	183	+1.48%
2017	174	−1.00%
2023	171	−0.29%
Source: INSEE

== See also ==
- Communes of the Meurthe-et-Moselle department
