= Madon =

River in France

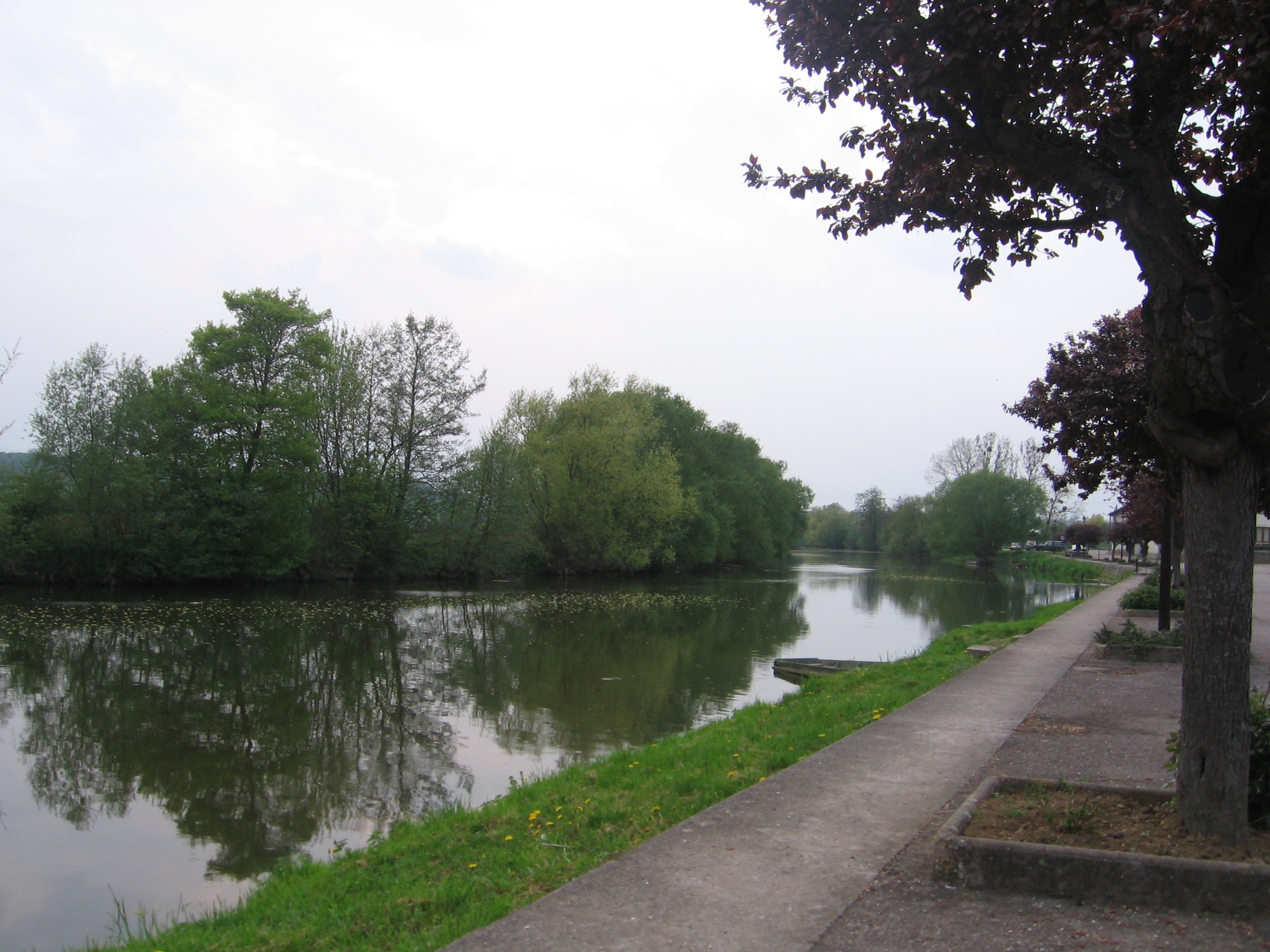
- The Madon near Haroué

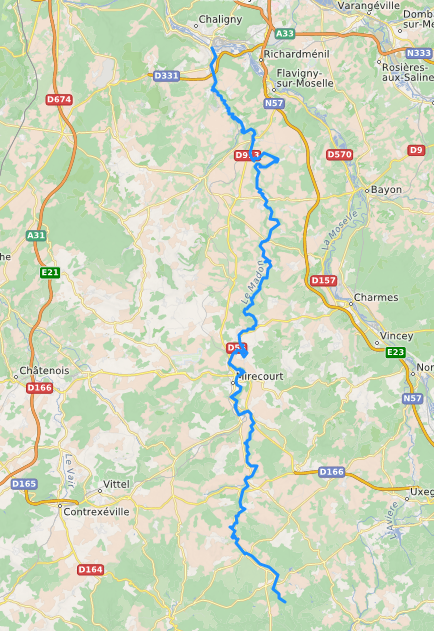

Location
- Country: France

Physical characteristics
- Source
  - location: Vioménil
  - coordinates: 48°06′03″N 06°12′12″E
  - elevation: 410 m (1,350 ft)
- Mouth
  - location: Moselle
  - coordinates: 48°36′21″N 06°06′11″E
  - elevation: 220 m (720 ft)
- Length: 96.9 km (60.2 mi)
- Basin size: 1,032 km^{2} (398 sq mi)
- Discharge
  - average: 11.1 m^{3}/s (390 cu ft/s)

Basin features
- Progression: Moselle→ Rhine→ North Sea

The Madon (French pronunciation: [madɔ̃]) is a 96.9-kilometre (60.2 mi) long river in the Vosges and Meurthe-et-Moselle départements, northeastern France. Its source is near Vioménil. It flows generally north. It is a left tributary of the Moselle into which it flows at Pont-Saint-Vincent, near Nancy.

== Départements and communes along its course ==
This list is ordered from source to mouth:

- Vosges: Vioménil, Escles, Lerrain, Les Vallois, Pont-lès-Bonfays, Frénois, Légéville-et-Bonfays, Begnécourt, Bainville-aux-Saules, Hagécourt, Valleroy-aux-Saules, Maroncourt, Velotte-et-Tatignécourt, Hymont, Vroville, Mattaincourt, Mirecourt, Poussay, Mazirot, Chauffecourt, Ambacourt, Bettoncourt, Vomécourt-sur-Madon, Pont-sur-Madon, Xaronval, Marainville-sur-Madon, Battexey
- Meurthe-et-Moselle: Bralleville, Jevoncourt, Xirocourt, Vaudigny, Vaudeville, Affracourt, Haroué, Gerbécourt-et-Haplemont, Ormes-et-Ville, Lemainville, Voinémont, Ceintrey, Autrey, Pulligny, Pierreville, Frolois, Xeuilley, Bainville-sur-Madon, Méréville, Pont-Saint-Vincent

At Ambacourt, two kilometers downstream from Mirecourt, the river accommodates a small colony of beavers: this is believed to reflect the quality of the water.
