= Velotte-et-Tatignécourt =

- Commune
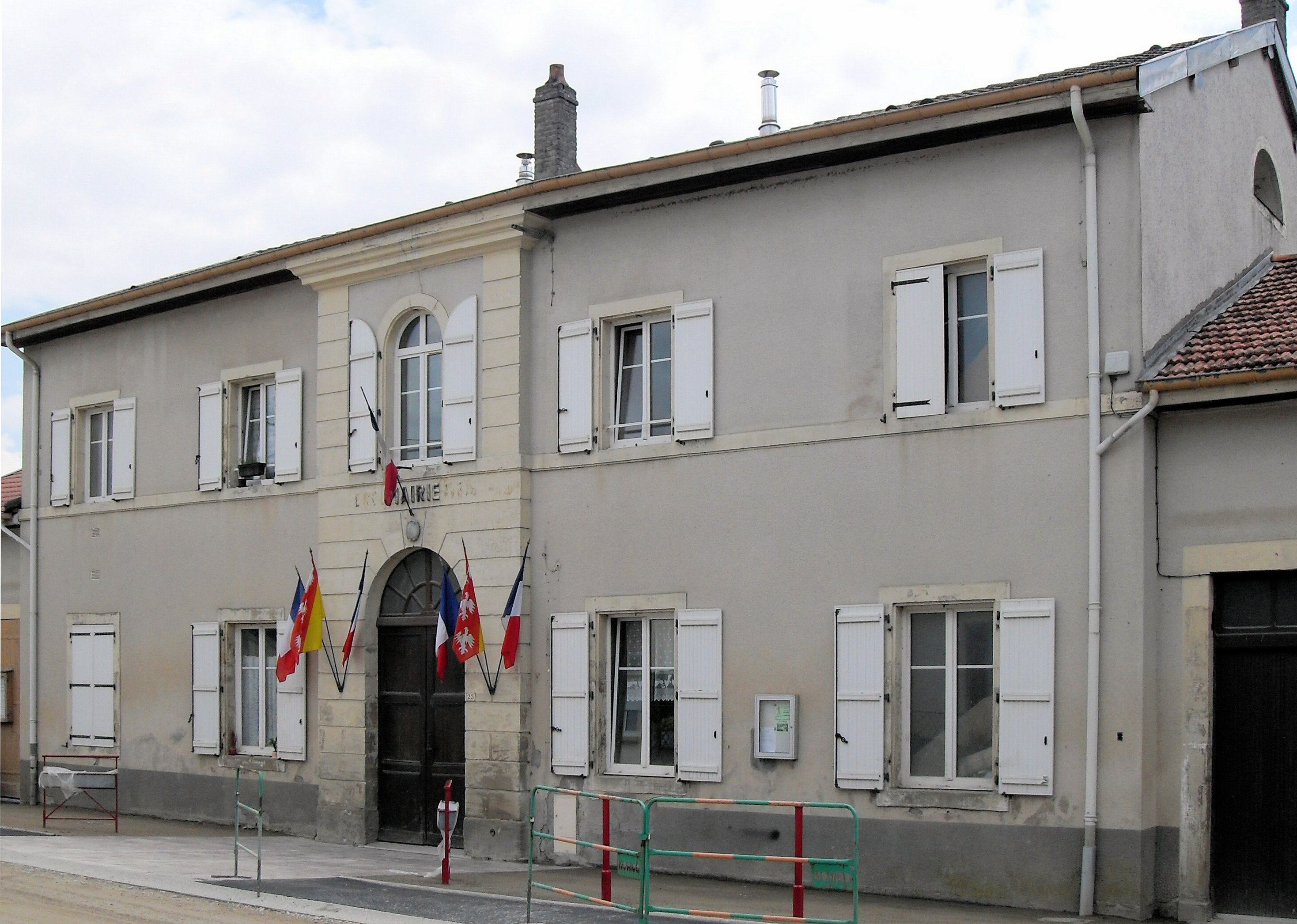
- The town hall in Velotte-et-Tatignécourt

- Coat of arms
- Location of Velotte-et-Tatignécourt
- Location within France Location within Grand Est
- Coordinates: 48°15′47″N 6°10′34″E
- Country: France
- Region: Grand Est
- Department: Vosges
- Arrondissement: Neufchâteau
- Canton: Darney
- Intercommunality: CC Mirecourt Dompaire

Government
  - Mayor (2020–2026): Jean-Luc Huel
- Area^{1}: 5.36 km^{2} (2.07 sq mi)
- Elevation: 275 m (902 ft)
- Highest elevation: 362 m (1,188 ft)
- Lowest elevation: 272 m (892 ft)
- Population (2023): 158
  - Density: 29.5/km^{2} (76.3/sq mi)
- Time zone: UTC+01:00 (CET)
  - Summer (DST): UTC+02:00 (CEST)
- INSEE/Postal code: 88499 /88270
- ^{1} French Land Register data, which excludes lakes, ponds, glaciers > 1 km^{2} (0.386 sq mi or 247 acres) and river estuaries.

Velotte-et-Tatignécourt (French pronunciation: [vəlɔt e tatiɲekuʁ]) is a commune in the Vosges department in Grand Est in northeastern France.

== Geography ==
The river Madon forms the commune's western border.

== See also ==
- Communes of the Vosges department
