= Ambacourt =

- Commune
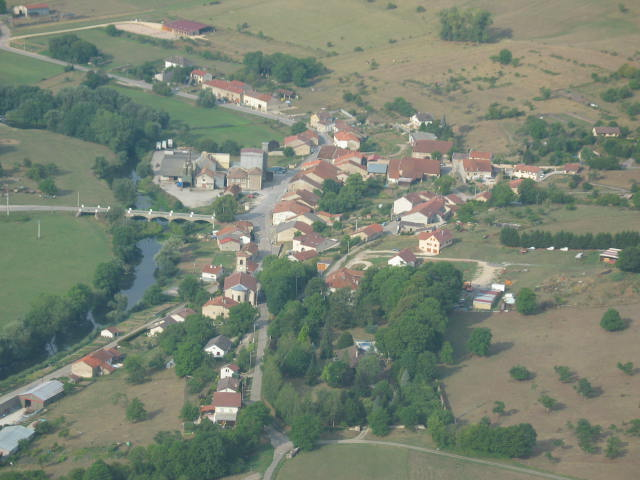
- An aerial view of Ambacourt

- Coat of arms
- Location of Ambacourt
- Location within France Location within Grand Est
- Coordinates: 48°20′52″N 6°08′32″E
- Country: France
- Region: Grand Est
- Department: Vosges
- Arrondissement: Neufchâteau
- Canton: Mirecourt
- Intercommunality: CC Mirecourt Dompaire

Government
  - Mayor (2020–2026): André Oswald
- Area^{1}: 6.76 km^{2} (2.61 sq mi)
- Elevation: 260 m (850 ft)
- Highest elevation: 357 m (1,171 ft)
- Lowest elevation: 252 m (827 ft)
- Population (2023): 300
  - Density: 44/km^{2} (110/sq mi)
- Time zone: UTC+01:00 (CET)
  - Summer (DST): UTC+02:00 (CEST)
- INSEE/Postal code: 88006 /88500
- ^{1} French Land Register data, which excludes lakes, ponds, glaciers > 1 km^{2} (0.386 sq mi or 247 acres) and river estuaries.

Ambacourt (French pronunciation: [ɑ̃bakuʁ]) is a commune in the Vosges department in Grand Est in northeastern France.

== Geography ==
The river Madon flows through the commune. The river here accommodates a small colony of beavers: this is believed to reflect the quality of the water.

== See also ==
- Communes of the Vosges department
