= Hagécourt =

- Commune
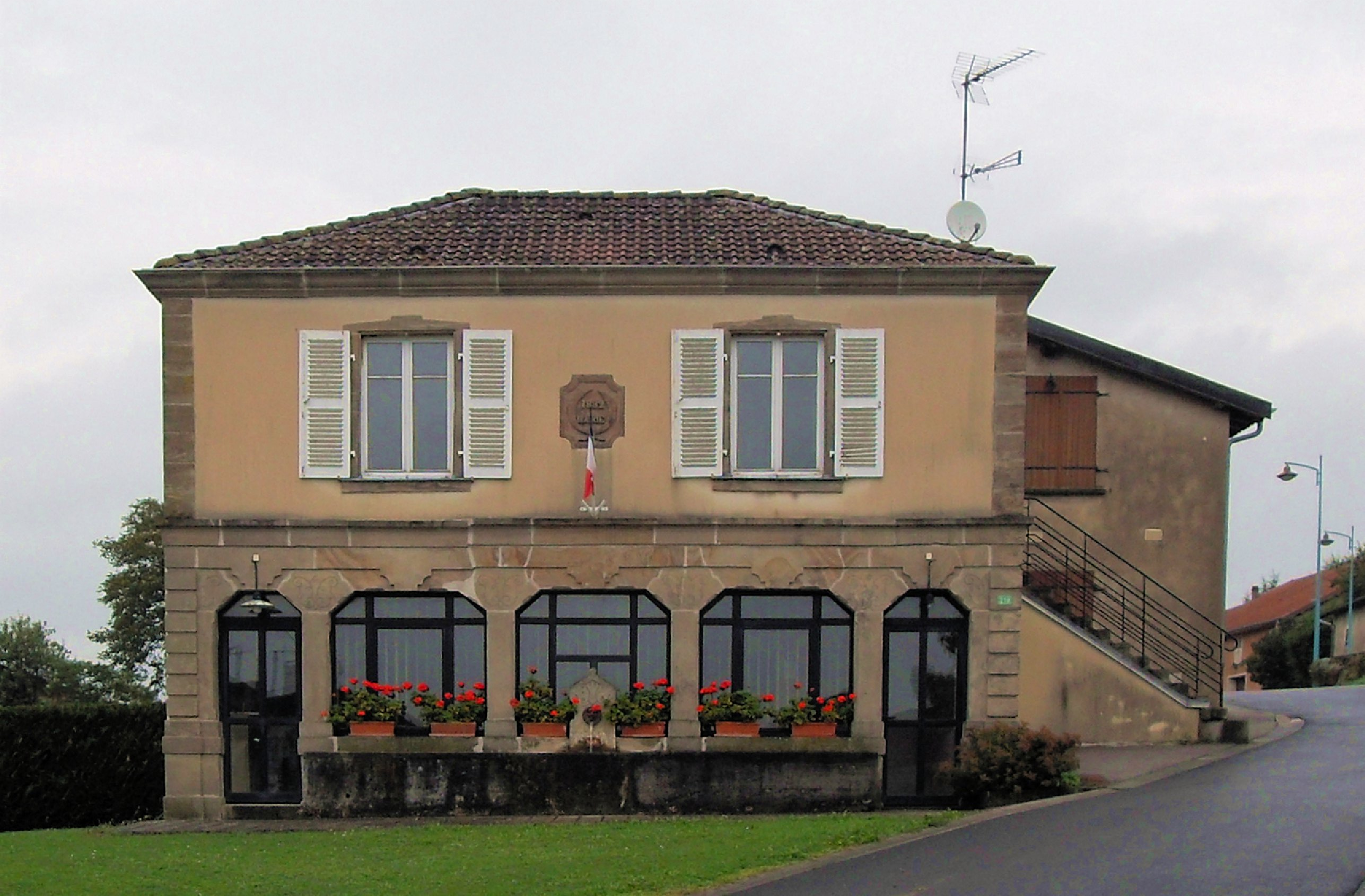
- The town hall in Hagécourt
- Location of Hagécourt
- Location within France Location within Grand Est
- Coordinates: 48°14′14″N 6°09′18″E
- Country: France
- Region: Grand Est
- Department: Vosges
- Arrondissement: Neufchâteau
- Canton: Darney
- Intercommunality: Mirecourt Dompaire

Government
  - Mayor (2020–2026): Philippe Tissier
- Area^{1}: 7.6 km^{2} (2.9 sq mi)
- Elevation: 285 m (935 ft)
- Highest elevation: 345 m (1,132 ft)
- Lowest elevation: 276 m (906 ft)
- Population (2023): 128
  - Density: 17/km^{2} (44/sq mi)
- Time zone: UTC+01:00 (CET)
  - Summer (DST): UTC+02:00 (CEST)
- INSEE/Postal code: 88226 /88270
- ^{1} French Land Register data, which excludes lakes, ponds, glaciers > 1 km^{2} (0.386 sq mi or 247 acres) and river estuaries.

Hagécourt (French pronunciation: [aʒekuʁ]) is a commune in the Vosges department in Grand Est in northeastern France.

== Population ==
Historical population
| Year | Pop. | ±% p.a. |
|---|---|---|
| 1968 | 110 | — |
| 1975 | 102 | −1.07% |
| 1982 | 114 | +1.60% |
| 1990 | 111 | −0.33% |
| 1999 | 150 | +3.40% |
| 2007 | 121 | −2.65% |
| 2012 | 114 | −1.18% |
| 2017 | 120 | +1.03% |
| 2023 | 128 | +1.08% |
Source: INSEE

== Geography ==
The river Madon flows through the commune.

== See also ==
- Communes of the Vosges department
