= Chauffecourt =

- Commune
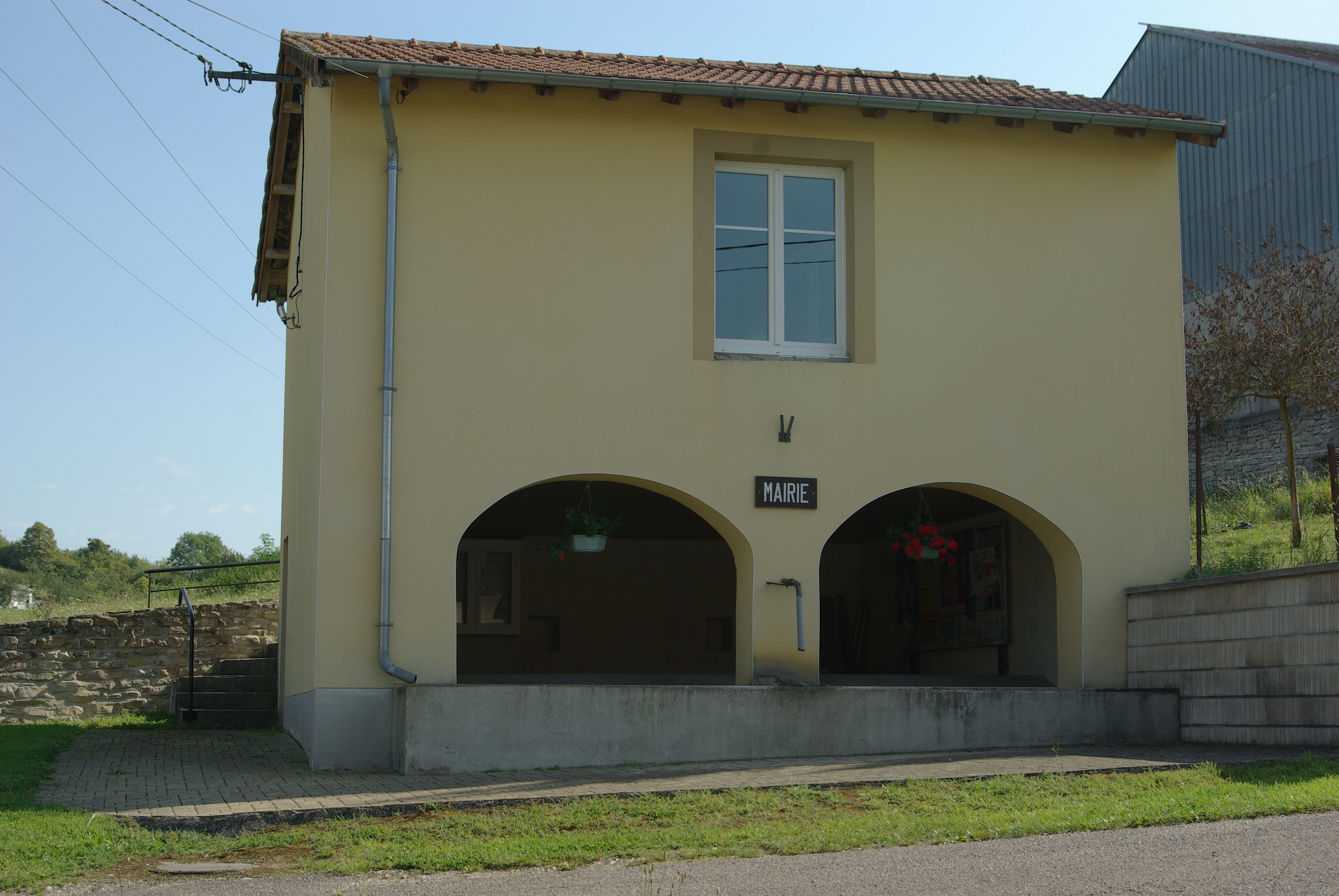
- The town hall in Chauffecourt
- Location of Chauffecourt
- Location within France Location within Grand Est
- Coordinates: 48°19′59″N 6°09′08″E
- Country: France
- Region: Grand Est
- Department: Vosges
- Arrondissement: Neufchâteau
- Canton: Mirecourt
- Intercommunality: CC Mirecourt Dompaire

Government
  - Mayor (2020–2026): Michel Del
- Area^{1}: 1.89 km^{2} (0.73 sq mi)
- Highest elevation: 347 m (1,138 ft)
- Lowest elevation: 255 m (837 ft)
- Population (2023): 41
  - Density: 22/km^{2} (56/sq mi)
- Time zone: UTC+01:00 (CET)
  - Summer (DST): UTC+02:00 (CEST)
- INSEE/Postal code: 88097 /88500
- ^{1} French Land Register data, which excludes lakes, ponds, glaciers > 1 km^{2} (0.386 sq mi or 247 acres) and river estuaries.

Chauffecourt (French pronunciation: [ʃofkuʁ]) is a commune in the Vosges department in Grand Est in northeastern France.

== Geography ==
The Madon forms the commune's western border.

== See also ==
- Communes of the Vosges department
