= Autrey, Meurthe-et-Moselle =

Autrey
- Commune
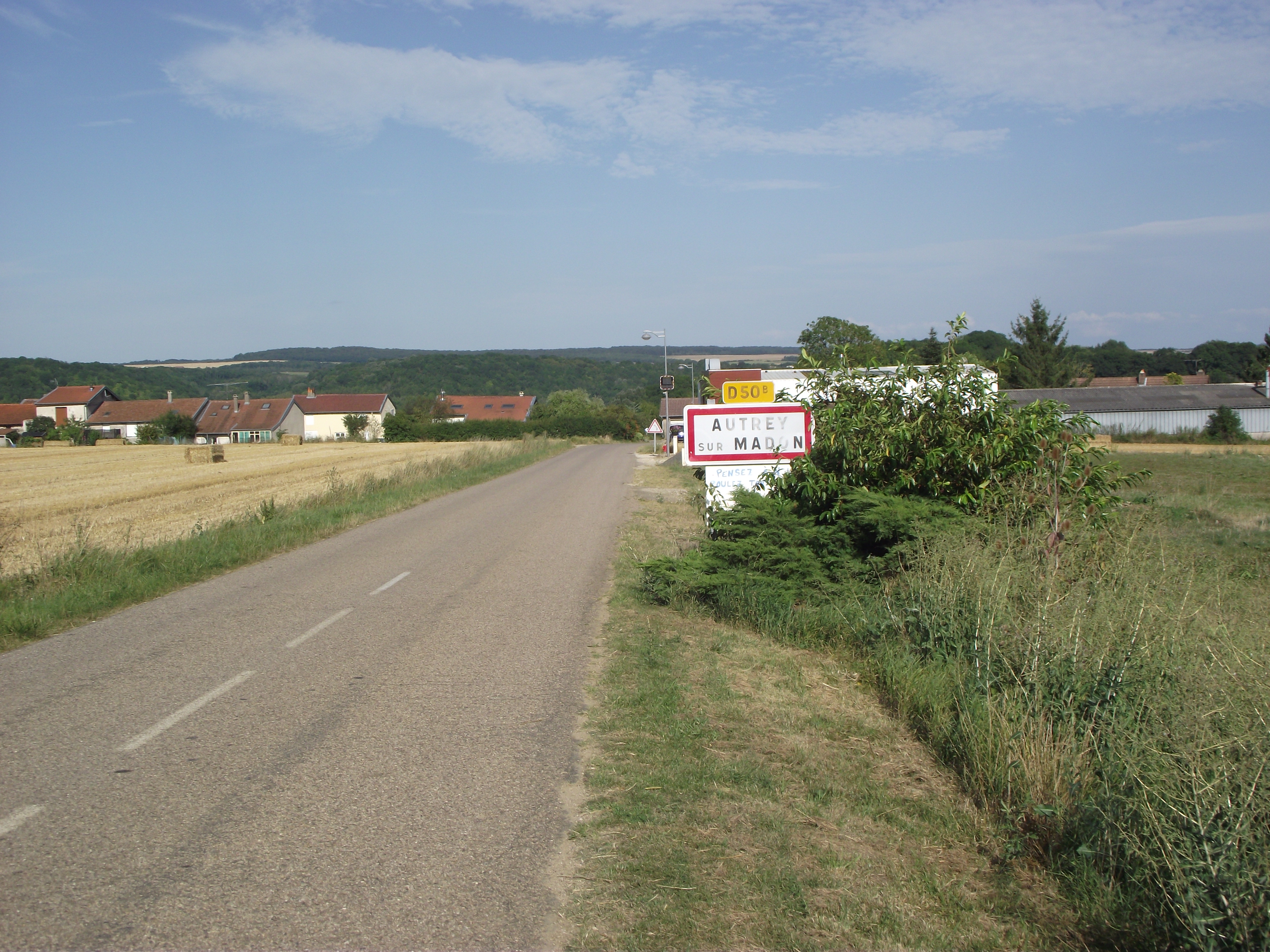
- The road into Autrey

- Coat of arms
- Location of Autrey
- Location within France Location within Grand Est
- Coordinates: 48°31′58″N 6°07′52″E
- Country: France
- Region: Grand Est
- Department: Meurthe-et-Moselle
- Arrondissement: Nancy
- Canton: Meine au Saintois
- Intercommunality: CC Pays Saintois

Government
  - Mayor (2020–2026): Vincent Peultier
- Area^{1}: 6.16 km^{2} (2.38 sq mi)
- Elevation: 290 m (950 ft)
- Highest elevation: 310 m (1,020 ft)
- Lowest elevation: 226 m (741 ft)
- Population (2023): 192
  - Density: 31.2/km^{2} (80.7/sq mi)
- Time zone: UTC+01:00 (CET)
  - Summer (DST): UTC+02:00 (CEST)
- INSEE/Postal code: 54032 /54160
- ^{1} French Land Register data, which excludes lakes, ponds, glaciers > 1 km^{2} (0.386 sq mi or 247 acres) and river estuaries.

Autrey (French pronunciation: [otʁɛ]) is a commune in the Meurthe-et-Moselle department in northeastern France.

== Geography ==
The river Madon flows through the commune.

== See also ==
- Communes of the Meurthe-et-Moselle department
