= Vaudeville, Meurthe-et-Moselle =

Vaudeville
- Commune
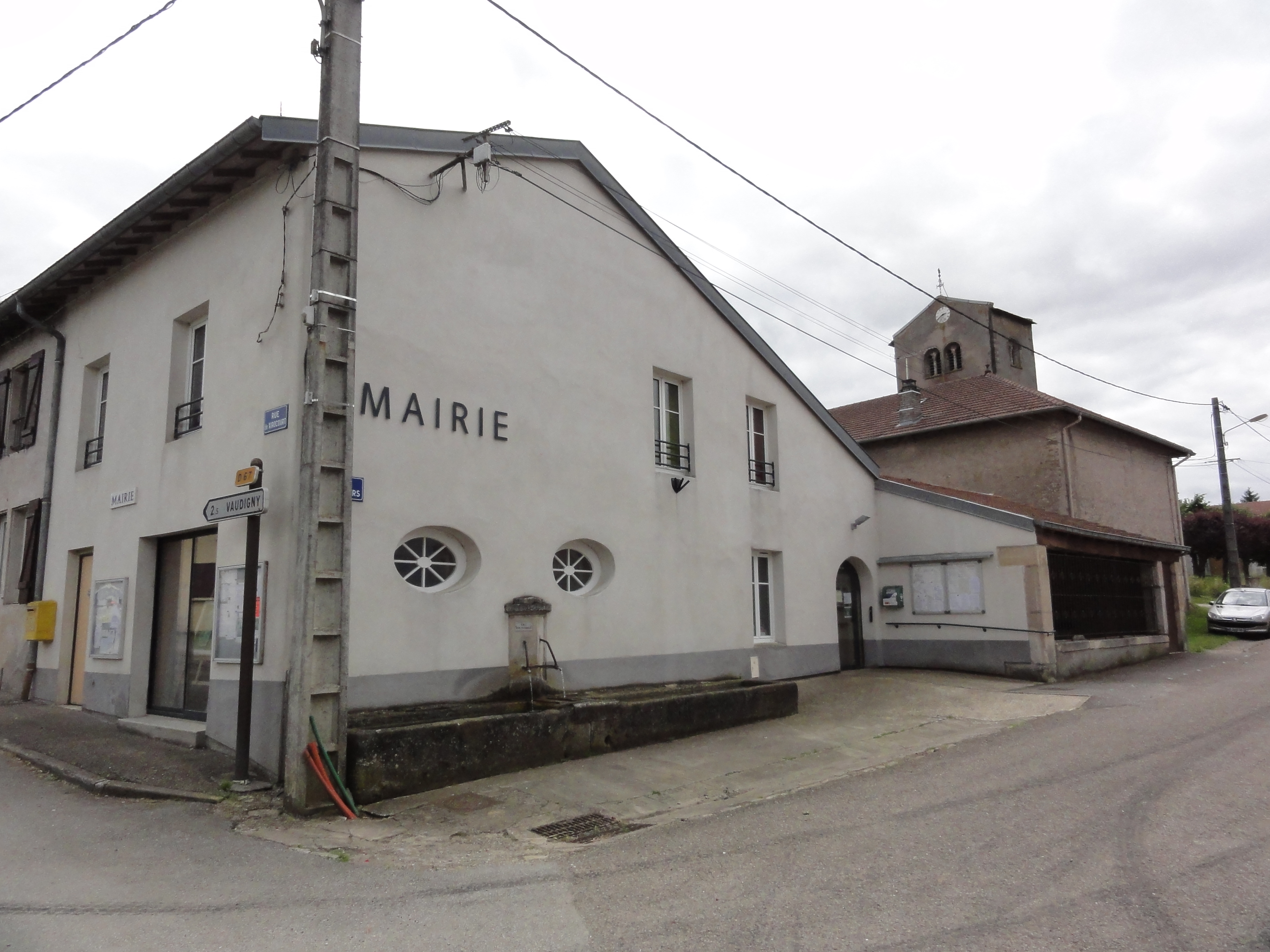
- The town hall in Vaudeville

- Coat of arms
- Location of Vaudeville
- Location within France Location within Grand Est
- Coordinates: 48°27′35″N 6°12′07″E
- Country: France
- Region: Grand Est
- Department: Meurthe-et-Moselle
- Arrondissement: Nancy
- Canton: Meine au Saintois

Government
  - Mayor (2020–2026): Vincent Stoll
- Area^{1}: 9.05 km^{2} (3.49 sq mi)
- Elevation: 280 m (920 ft)
- Highest elevation: 362 m (1,188 ft)
- Lowest elevation: 238 m (781 ft)
- Population (2023): 166
  - Density: 18.3/km^{2} (47.5/sq mi)
- Time zone: UTC+01:00 (CET)
  - Summer (DST): UTC+02:00 (CEST)
- INSEE/Postal code: 54553 /54740
- ^{1} French Land Register data, which excludes lakes, ponds, glaciers > 1 km^{2} (0.386 sq mi or 247 acres) and river estuaries.

Vaudeville (French pronunciation: [vodvil]) is a commune in the Meurthe-et-Moselle department in north-eastern France.

== Geography ==
The river Madon flows through the commune.

== See also ==
- Communes of the Meurthe-et-Moselle department
