= Valleroy-aux-Saules =

- Commune
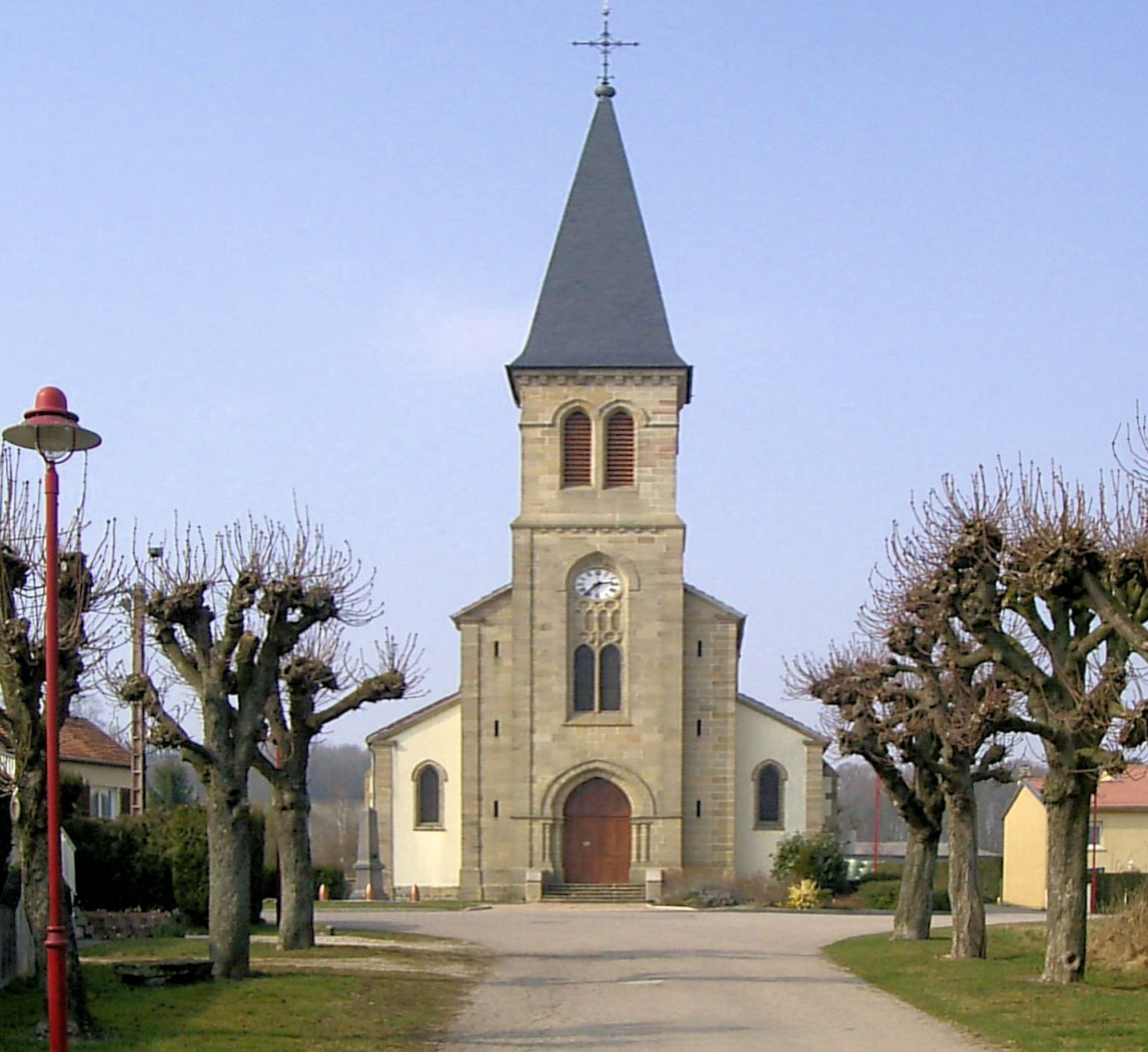
- Saint-Brice

- Coat of arms
- Location of Valleroy-aux-Saules
- Location within France Location within Grand Est
- Coordinates: 48°14′55″N 6°08′37″E
- Country: France
- Region: Grand Est
- Department: Vosges
- Arrondissement: Neufchâteau
- Canton: Mirecourt
- Intercommunality: CC Mirecourt Dompaire

Government
  - Mayor (2020–2026): Gérard Grépinet
- Area^{1}: 5.03 km^{2} (1.94 sq mi)
- Elevation: 293 m (961 ft)
- Highest elevation: 373 m (1,224 ft)
- Lowest elevation: 274 m (899 ft)
- Population (2023): 255
  - Density: 50.7/km^{2} (131/sq mi)
- Time zone: UTC+01:00 (CET)
  - Summer (DST): UTC+02:00 (CEST)
- INSEE/Postal code: 88489 /88270
- ^{1} French Land Register data, which excludes lakes, ponds, glaciers > 1 km^{2} (0.386 sq mi or 247 acres) and river estuaries.

Valleroy-aux-Saules (French pronunciation: [valʁwa o sol]) is a commune in the Vosges department in Grand Est in northeastern France.

== Geography ==
The river Madon flows through the commune.

== See also ==
- Communes of the Vosges department
