= Mazirot =

- Commune
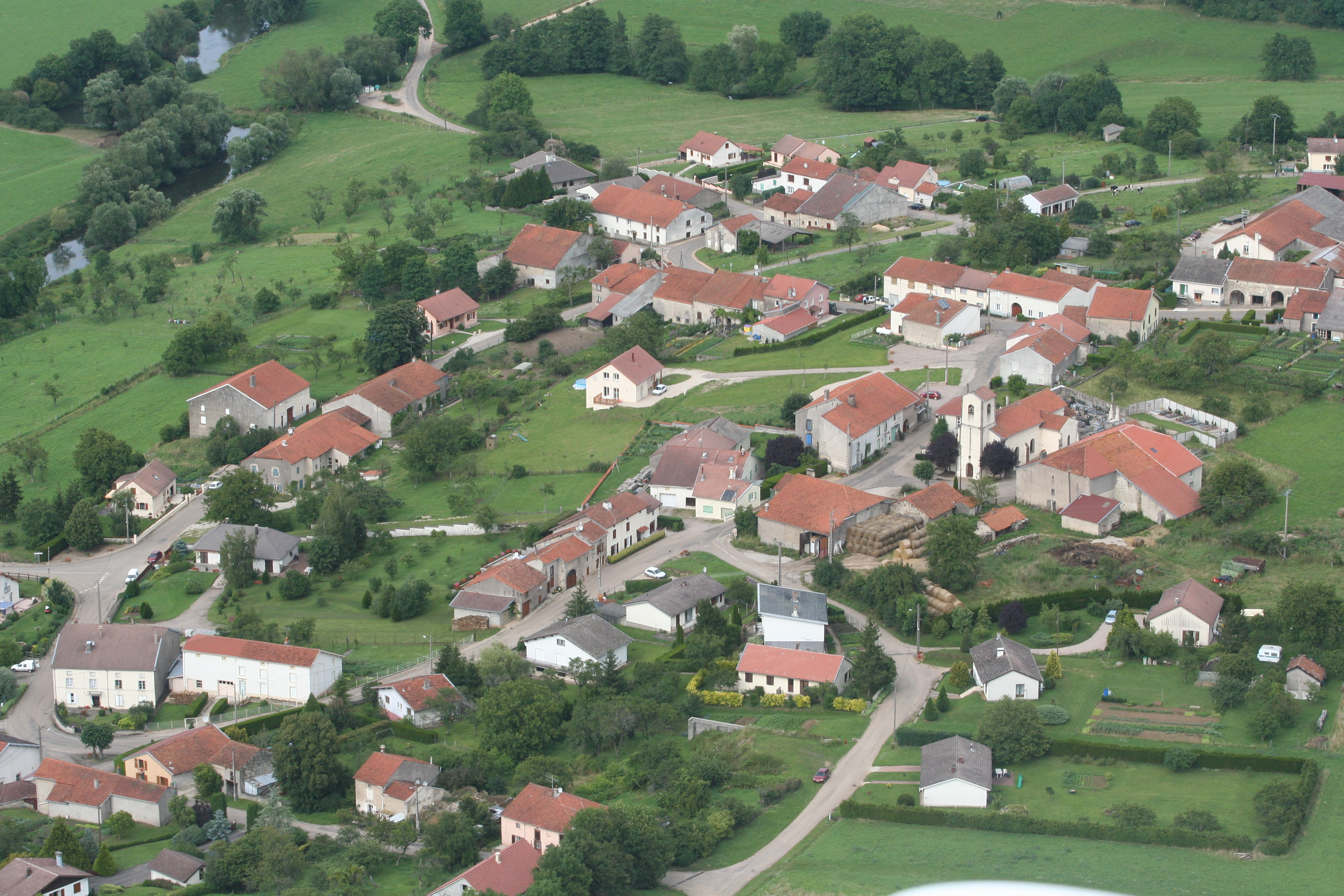
- A general view of Mazirot
- Location of Mazirot
- Location within France Location within Grand Est
- Coordinates: 48°19′24″N 6°08′51″E
- Country: France
- Region: Grand Est
- Department: Vosges
- Arrondissement: Neufchâteau
- Canton: Mirecourt
- Intercommunality: CC Mirecourt Dompaire

Government
  - Mayor (2020–2026): Dominique Maillard
- Area^{1}: 6.55 km^{2} (2.53 sq mi)
- Elevation: 263 m (863 ft)
- Highest elevation: 390 m (1,280 ft)
- Lowest elevation: 255 m (837 ft)
- Population (2023): 234
  - Density: 35.7/km^{2} (92.5/sq mi)
- Time zone: UTC+01:00 (CET)
  - Summer (DST): UTC+02:00 (CEST)
- INSEE/Postal code: 88295 /88500
- ^{1} French Land Register data, which excludes lakes, ponds, glaciers > 1 km^{2} (0.386 sq mi or 247 acres) and river estuaries.

Mazirot (French pronunciation: [maziʁo]) is a commune in the Vosges department in Grand Est in northeastern France.

Inhabitants are called Mazuriens.

== Geography ==
Mazirot is positioned between Épinal and Neufchâteau, a couple of kilometres to the north-east of Mirecourt in the valley of the River Madon which itself at one point provides the frontier with the commune of Poussay to the west.

The drive down towards Mirecourt offers a superb panorama of that town. Meanwhile, on its western side, the entrance to Mazirot is marked by the residence of the local landlord. From here a bridge spanning the Madon leads to the slopes on the river's right bank where the village has grown up.

== See also ==
- Communes of the Vosges department
