= Voinémont =

- Commune
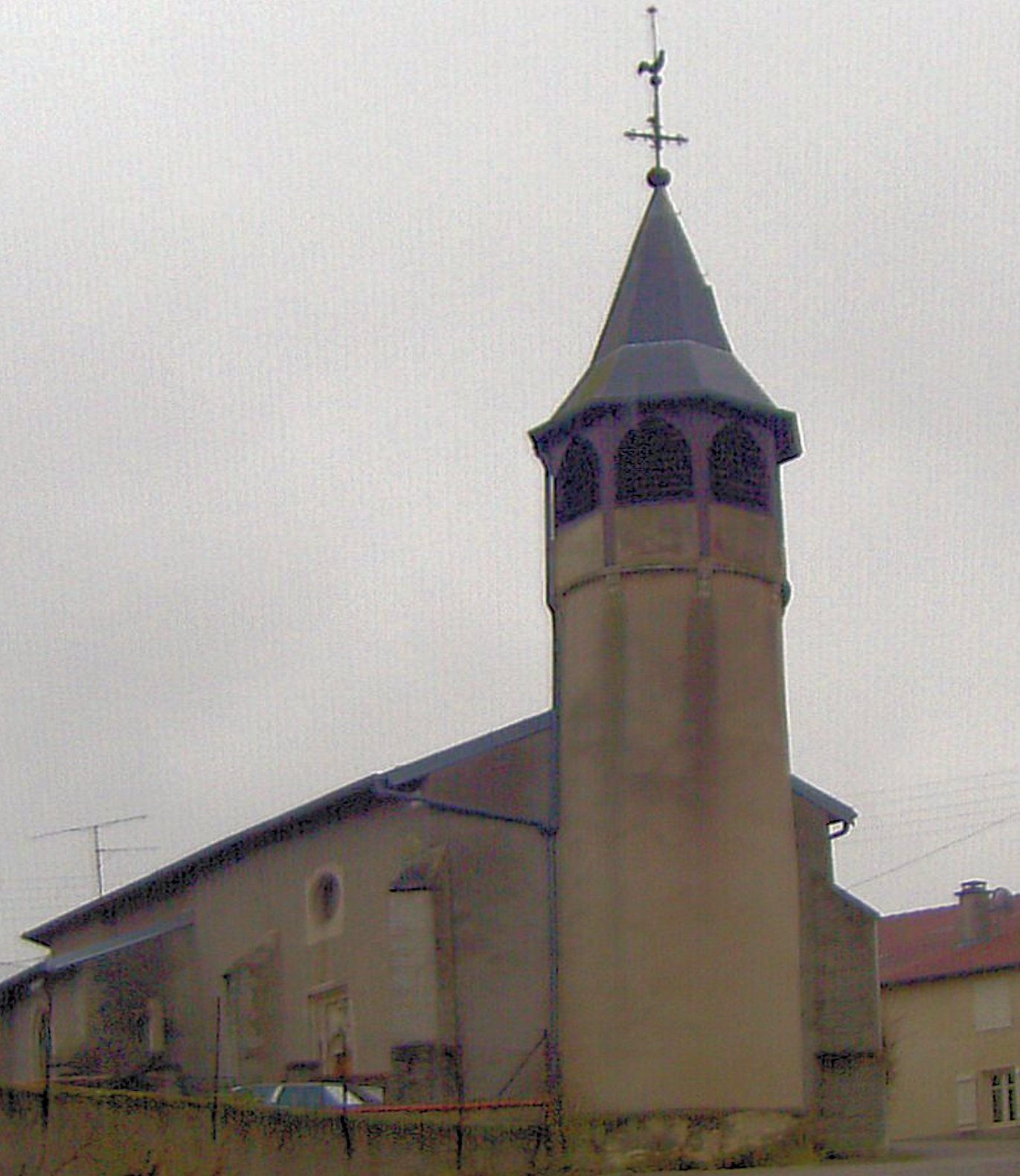
- The church in Voinémont

- Coat of arms
- Location of Voinémont
- Location within France Location within Grand Est
- Coordinates: 48°31′19″N 6°09′49″E
- Country: France
- Region: Grand Est
- Department: Meurthe-et-Moselle
- Arrondissement: Nancy
- Canton: Meine au Saintois
- Intercommunality: Pays du Saintois

Government
  - Mayor (2020–2026): Marie-France Siron
- Area^{1}: 4.11 km^{2} (1.59 sq mi)
- Elevation: 238 m (781 ft)
- Highest elevation: 314 m (1,030 ft)
- Lowest elevation: 229 m (751 ft)
- Population (2023): 334
  - Density: 81.3/km^{2} (210/sq mi)
- Time zone: UTC+01:00 (CET)
  - Summer (DST): UTC+02:00 (CEST)
- INSEE/Postal code: 54591 /54134
- ^{1} French Land Register data, which excludes lakes, ponds, glaciers > 1 km^{2} (0.386 sq mi or 247 acres) and river estuaries.

Voinémont (French pronunciation: [vwanemɔ̃]) is a commune in the Meurthe-et-Moselle department in north-eastern France.

== Geography ==
The village lies in the north-western part of the commune, on the right bank of the river Madon, which forms all of the commune's southern and western borders.

== See also ==
- Communes of the Meurthe-et-Moselle department
