= Frénois, Vosges =

Frénois
- Commune
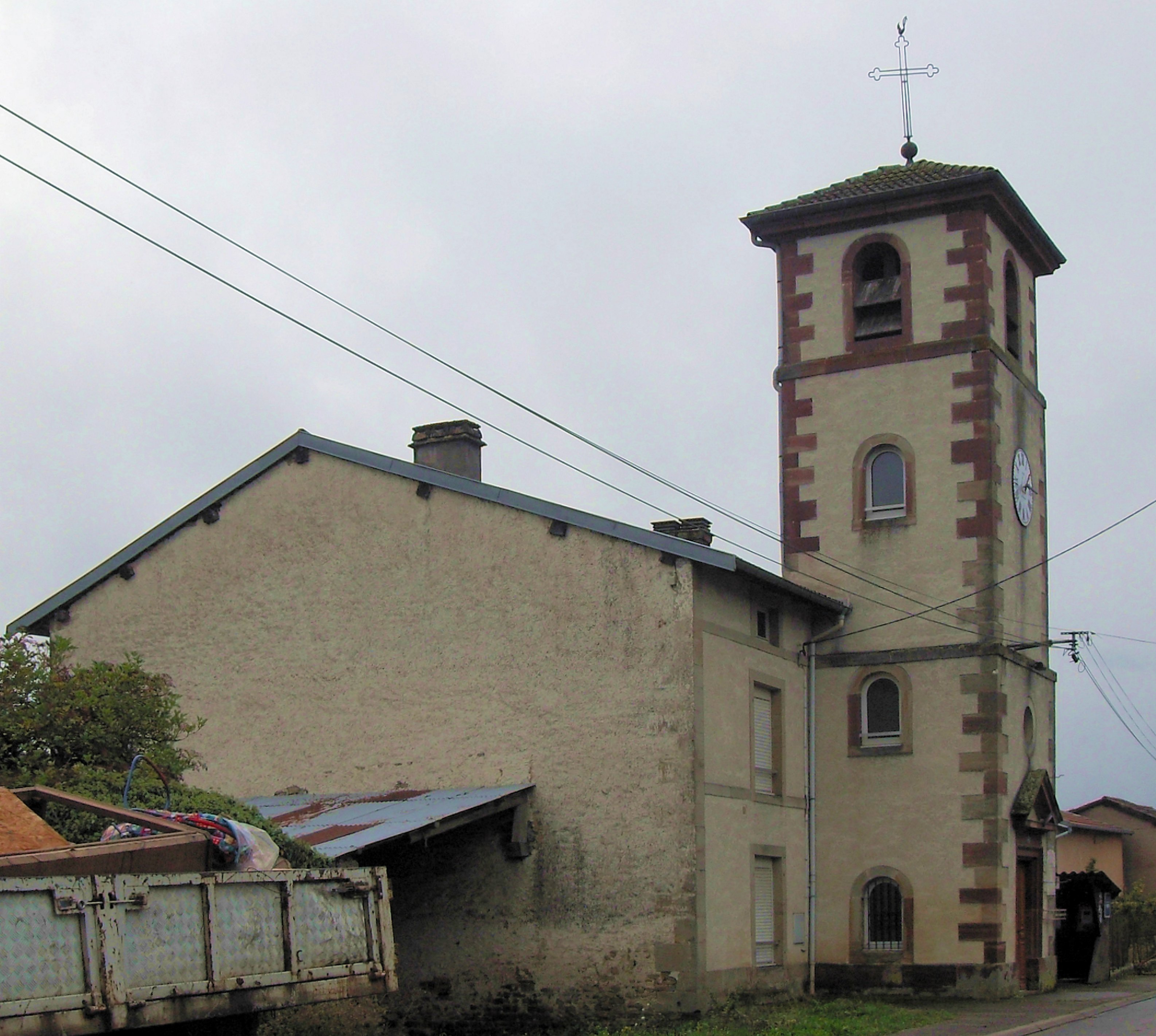
- The town hall and chapel in Frénois
- Location of Frénois
- Location within France Location within Grand Est
- Coordinates: 48°11′21″N 6°07′23″E
- Country: France
- Region: Grand Est
- Department: Vosges
- Arrondissement: Neufchâteau
- Canton: Darney
- Intercommunality: CC Vosges côté Sud-Ouest

Government
  - Mayor (2020–2026): Gilles Gantois
- Area^{1}: 4.94 km^{2} (1.91 sq mi)
- Elevation: 340 m (1,120 ft)
- Highest elevation: 385 m (1,263 ft)
- Lowest elevation: 290 m (950 ft)
- Population (2023): 48
  - Density: 9.7/km^{2} (25/sq mi)
- Time zone: UTC+01:00 (CET)
  - Summer (DST): UTC+02:00 (CEST)
- INSEE/Postal code: 88187 /88270
- ^{1} French Land Register data, which excludes lakes, ponds, glaciers > 1 km^{2} (0.386 sq mi or 247 acres) and river estuaries.

Frénois (French pronunciation: [fʁenwa]) is a commune in the Vosges department in Grand Est in northeastern France.

== Geography ==
The river Madon forms part of the commune's southeastern border.

== See also ==
- Communes of the Vosges department
