= Pierreville, Meurthe-et-Moselle =

Pierreville
- Commune
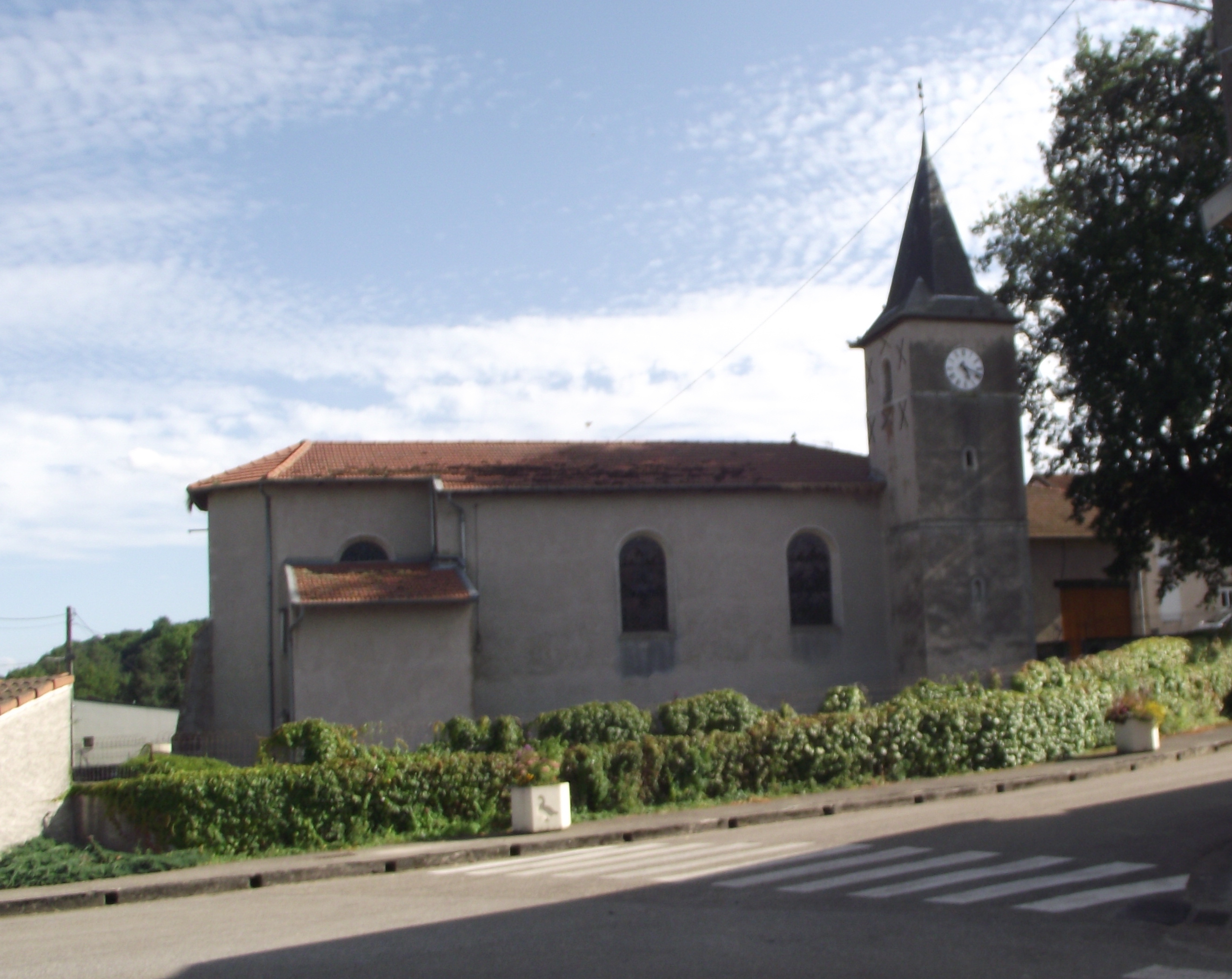
- The church in Pierreville

- Coat of arms
- Location of Pierreville
- Location within France Location within Grand Est
- Coordinates: 48°32′59″N 6°07′21″E
- Country: France
- Region: Grand Est
- Department: Meurthe-et-Moselle
- Arrondissement: Nancy
- Canton: Meine au Saintois
- Intercommunality: Moselle et Madon

Government
  - Mayor (2020–2026): Thierry Weyer
- Area^{1}: 2.87 km^{2} (1.11 sq mi)
- Elevation: 220 m (720 ft)
- Highest elevation: 300 m (980 ft)
- Lowest elevation: 225 m (738 ft)
- Population (2023): 299
  - Density: 104/km^{2} (270/sq mi)
- Time zone: UTC+01:00 (CET)
  - Summer (DST): UTC+02:00 (CEST)
- INSEE/Postal code: 54429 /54160
- ^{1} French Land Register data, which excludes lakes, ponds, glaciers > 1 km^{2} (0.386 sq mi or 247 acres) and river estuaries.

Pierreville (French pronunciation: [pjɛʁvil]) is a commune in the Meurthe-et-Moselle department in north-eastern France.

== Geography ==
The river Madon flows through the commune.

== See also ==
- Communes of the Meurthe-et-Moselle department
