= Orm =

Orm (in Old Norse and in modern Danish, Swedish, Norwegian (bokmål and nynorsk) the word for "snake", "worm" or "dragon") became an Anglo-Saxon personal name during period of the Danelaw.

Orm may also refer to:

- Orrm or Orrmin, the author of the Ormulum, a 12th century Christian text
- the commissioner of the Kirkdale sundial in 11th century England
- the Ocean Master, a DC Comics supervillain and half-brother to Aquaman
- Orm, the name of a dragon (and part of the name of other dragons) in the Earthsea series
- Orm (given name), with a list of people with this name

ORM as an acronym may refer to:

- Object–relational mapping, a software programming technique that allows accessing relational databases in the form of abstract objects
- Object–role modeling, a method for conceptual data modeling
- Oak Ridges Moraine, a geological landform in Ontario, Canada
- Observatorio del Roque de los Muchachos, an observatory on the island of La Palma
- Online reputation management
- Online research methods
- Operational risk management, a concept for safety in operations planning and execution
- Oromo language of the Horn of Africa (ISO code: orm)
- Orosomucoid, a glycoprotein
- Outsourcing relationship management
- Sywell Aerodrome in Northamptonshire, England (IATA airport code)
- OpenRailwayMap

== See also ==
- ORM-D
- Orme (disambiguation)
- Orn (disambiguation)
