= Jevoncourt =

- Commune
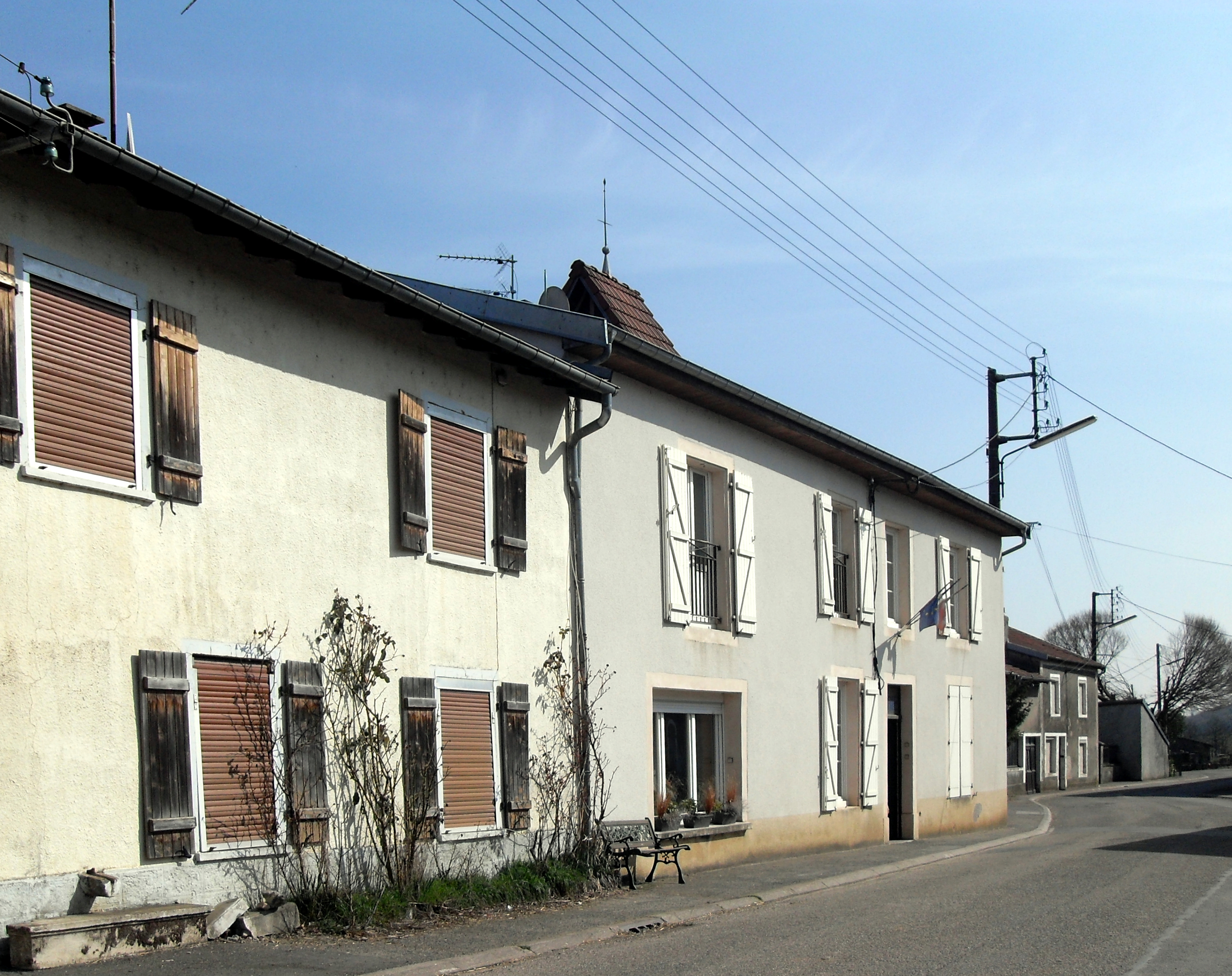
- The town hall in Jevoncourt

- Coat of arms
- Location of Jevoncourt
- Location within France Location within Grand Est
- Coordinates: 48°24′53″N 6°10′09″E
- Country: France
- Region: Grand Est
- Department: Meurthe-et-Moselle
- Arrondissement: Nancy
- Canton: Meine au Saintois
- Intercommunality: Pays du Saintois

Government
  - Mayor (2020–2026): Romuald Chesini
- Area^{1}: 3.29 km^{2} (1.27 sq mi)
- Elevation: 280 m (920 ft)
- Highest elevation: 321 m (1,053 ft)
- Lowest elevation: 246 m (807 ft)
- Population (2023): 103
  - Density: 31.3/km^{2} (81.1/sq mi)
- Time zone: UTC+01:00 (CET)
  - Summer (DST): UTC+02:00 (CEST)
- INSEE/Postal code: 54278 /54740
- ^{1} French Land Register data, which excludes lakes, ponds, glaciers > 1 km^{2} (0.386 sq mi or 247 acres) and river estuaries.

Jevoncourt (French pronunciation: [ʒəvɔ̃kuʁ]) is a commune in the Meurthe-et-Moselle department in north-eastern France.

== Geography ==
The river Madon flows through the commune.

== See also ==
- Communes of the Meurthe-et-Moselle department
