= Vroville =

- Commune
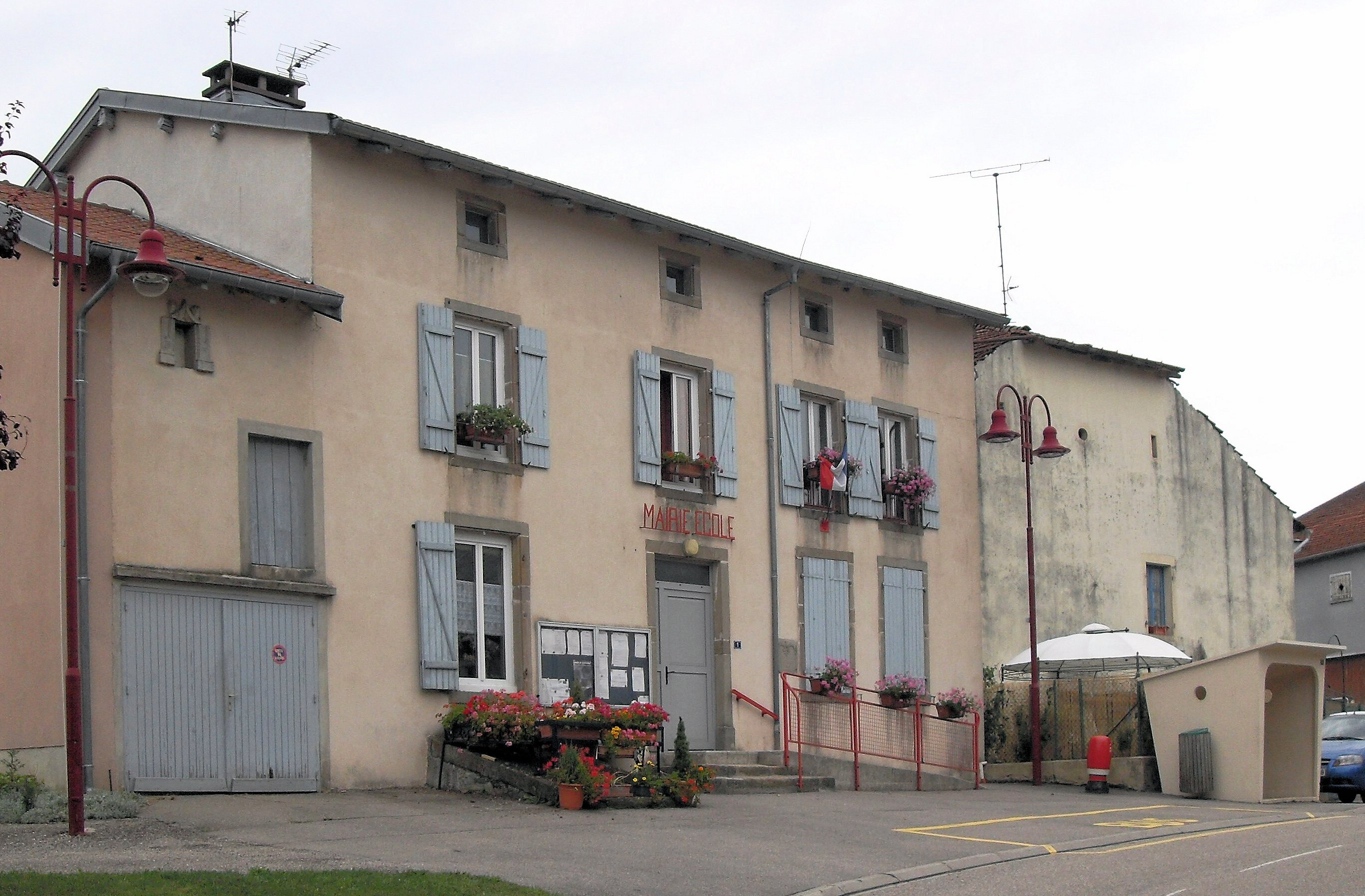
- The town hall in Vroville
- Location of Vroville
- Location within France Location within Grand Est
- Coordinates: 48°17′15″N 6°10′22″E
- Country: France
- Region: Grand Est
- Department: Vosges
- Arrondissement: Neufchâteau
- Canton: Mirecourt
- Intercommunality: Mirecourt Dompaire

Government
  - Mayor (2020–2026): Stéphane Bisch
- Area^{1}: 6.83 km^{2} (2.64 sq mi)
- Elevation: 300 m (980 ft)
- Highest elevation: 392 m (1,286 ft)
- Lowest elevation: 272 m (892 ft)
- Population (2023): 135
  - Density: 19.8/km^{2} (51.2/sq mi)
- Time zone: UTC+01:00 (CET)
  - Summer (DST): UTC+02:00 (CEST)
- INSEE/Postal code: 88525 /88500
- ^{1} French Land Register data, which excludes lakes, ponds, glaciers > 1 km^{2} (0.386 sq mi or 247 acres) and river estuaries.

Vroville (French pronunciation: [vʁɔvil]) is a commune in the Vosges department in Grand Est in northeastern France.

== Population ==
Historical population
Year	Pop.	±% p.a.
1968	115	—
1975	105	−1.29%
1982	120	+1.93%
1990	130	+1.01%
1999	131	+0.09%
2007	139	+0.74%
2012	138	−0.14%
2017	133	−0.74%
2023	135	+0.25%
Source: INSEE

== Geography ==
The river Madon flows through the commune.

== See also ==
- Communes of the Vosges department
