= Begnécourt =

- Commune
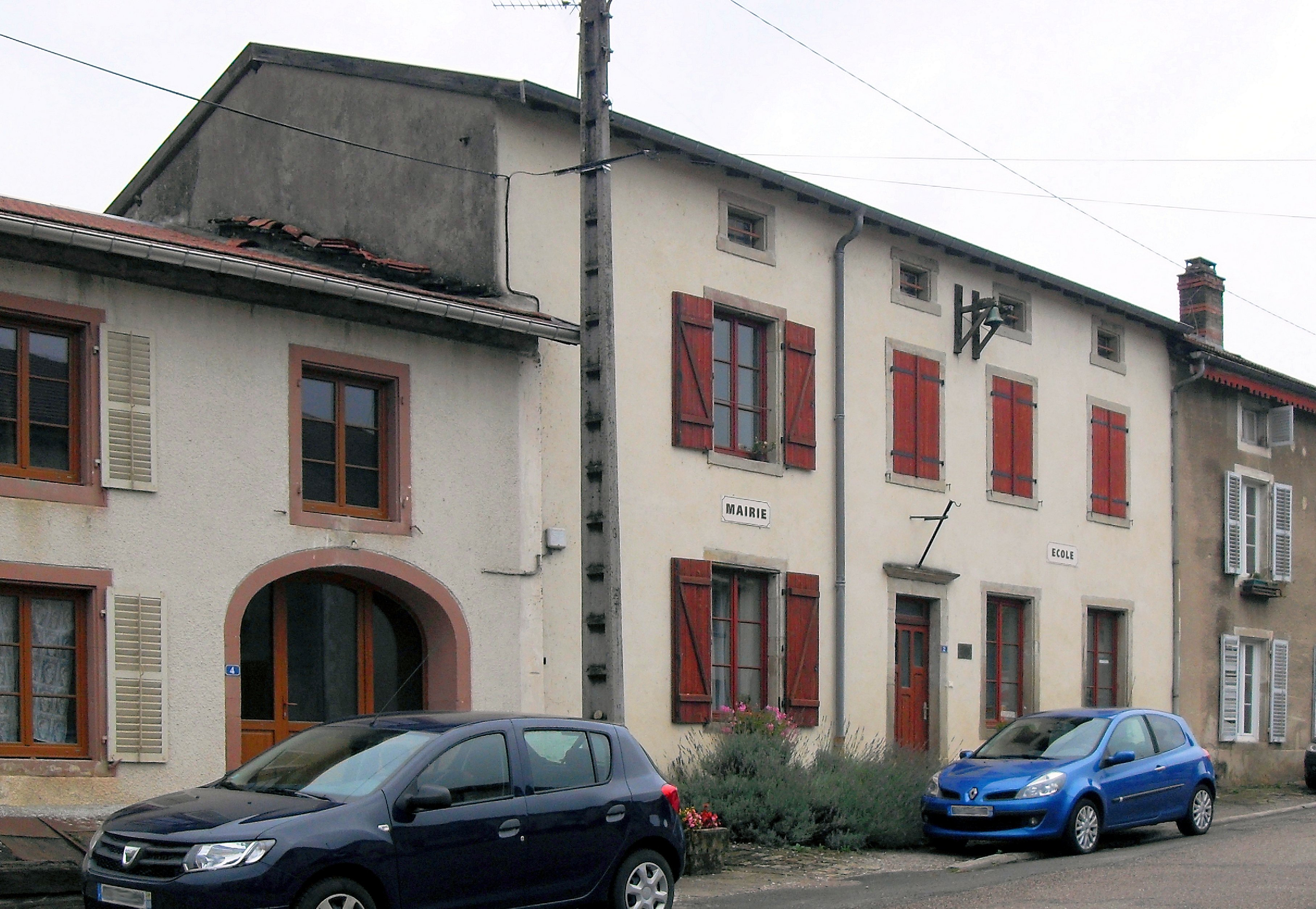
- The town hall and school in Begnécourt
- Location of Begnécourt
- Location within France Location within Grand Est
- Coordinates: 48°12′24″N 6°09′34″E
- Country: France
- Region: Grand Est
- Department: Vosges
- Arrondissement: Neufchâteau
- Canton: Darney
- Intercommunality: CC Mirecourt Dompaire

Government
  - Mayor (2023–2026): Myriam Duret
- Area^{1}: 4.57 km^{2} (1.76 sq mi)
- Elevation: 295 m (968 ft)
- Highest elevation: 366 m (1,201 ft)
- Lowest elevation: 283 m (928 ft)
- Population (2023): 139
  - Density: 30.4/km^{2} (78.8/sq mi)
- Time zone: UTC+01:00 (CET)
  - Summer (DST): UTC+02:00 (CEST)
- INSEE/Postal code: 88047 /88270
- ^{1} French Land Register data, which excludes lakes, ponds, glaciers > 1 km^{2} (0.386 sq mi or 247 acres) and river estuaries.

Begnécourt (French pronunciation: [bəɲekuʁ]) is a commune in the Vosges department in Grand Est in northeastern France.

== Geography ==
The river Madon flows through the commune.

== See also ==
- Communes of the Vosges department
