= Orn =

Orn or ORN may refer to:

- Orn (name), a given name and surname
- Orn, the second book in Piers Anthony's trilogy Of Man and Manta
- Offshoring Research Network, an international network researching the offshoring of business processes and services
- Olfactory receptor neuron, a type of cell in the nasal mucosa that transduces the presence of odorant molecules into a neural signal
- Olympic route network, a network of dedicated roads linking venues and other key sites in the host city during Olympic games
- Oran Es Sénia Airport (IATA code), an international airport in Es Sénia, Algeria
- Ornithine, an amino acid that plays a role in the urea cycle
- Osteoradionecrosis, a complication of radiation therapy where a section of bone dies

== See also ==
- Orm (disambiguation)
