= Xirocourt =

- Commune
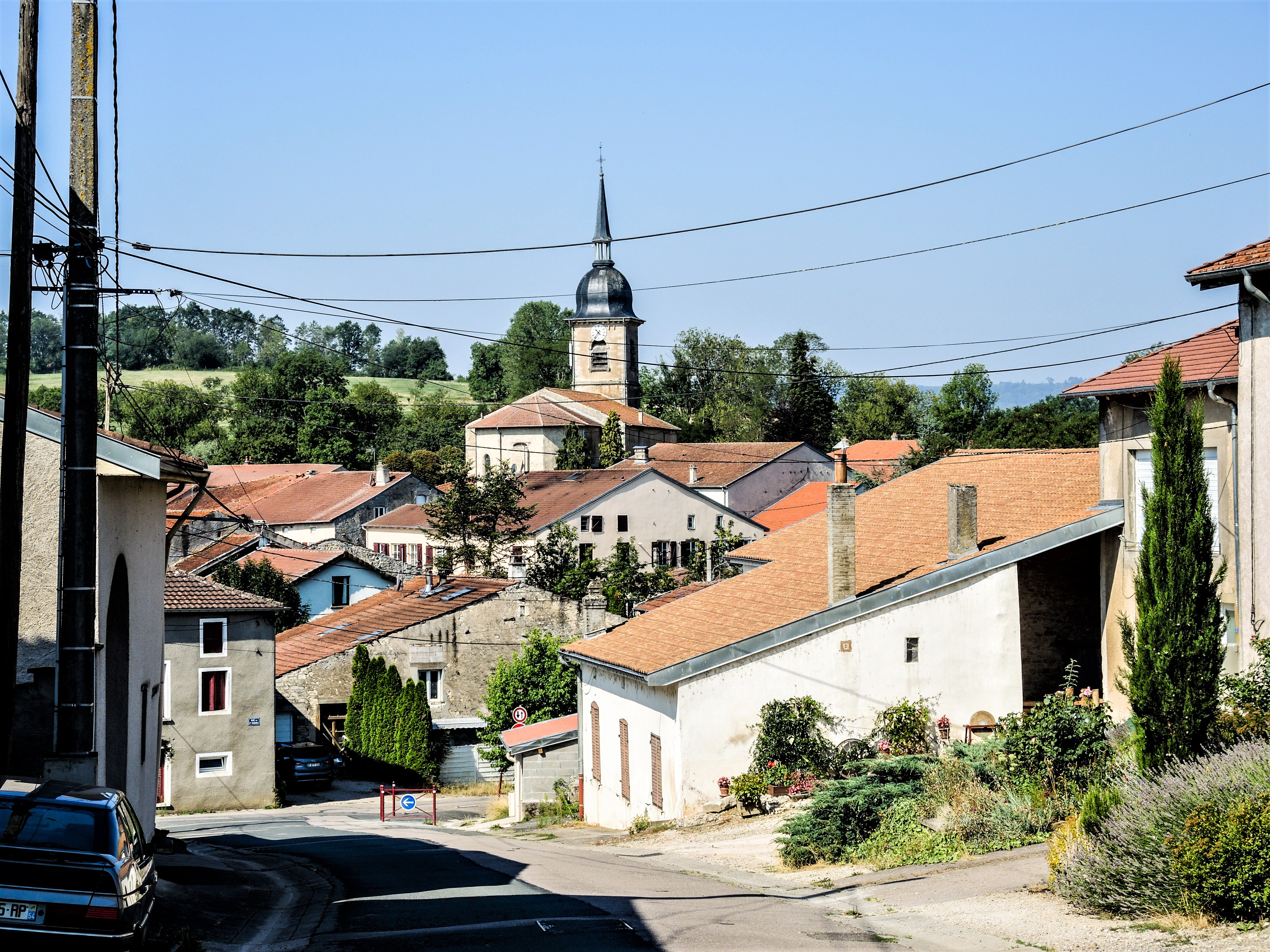
- The church and surroundings in Xirocourt

- Coat of arms
- Location of Xirocourt
- Location within France Location within Grand Est
- Coordinates: 48°25′52″N 6°10′24″E
- Country: France
- Region: Grand Est
- Department: Meurthe-et-Moselle
- Arrondissement: Nancy
- Canton: Meine au Saintois
- Intercommunality: Pays du Saintois

Government
  - Mayor (2020–2026): Marc François
- Area^{1}: 11.32 km^{2} (4.37 sq mi)
- Elevation: 214 m (702 ft)
- Highest elevation: 365 m (1,198 ft)
- Lowest elevation: 239 m (784 ft)
- Population (2023): 456
  - Density: 40.3/km^{2} (104/sq mi)
- Time zone: UTC+01:00 (CET)
  - Summer (DST): UTC+02:00 (CEST)
- INSEE/Postal code: 54597 /54740
- ^{1} French Land Register data, which excludes lakes, ponds, glaciers > 1 km^{2} (0.386 sq mi or 247 acres) and river estuaries.

Xirocourt (French pronunciation: [ɡziʁɔkuʁ]) is a commune in the Meurthe-et-Moselle department in north-eastern France.

== Population ==
Historical population
Year	Pop.	±% p.a.
1968	309	—
1975	277	−1.55%
1982	310	+1.62%
1990	338	+1.09%
1999	403	+1.97%
2007	456	+1.56%
2012	459	+0.13%
2017	442	−0.75%
2023	456	+0.52%
Source: INSEE

== Geography ==
The river Madon flows through the commune.

== Historic Features ==
A watermill dating from the 18th century is situated on the Madon, and a monumental bridge spans the same river.

== Religious Constructs ==
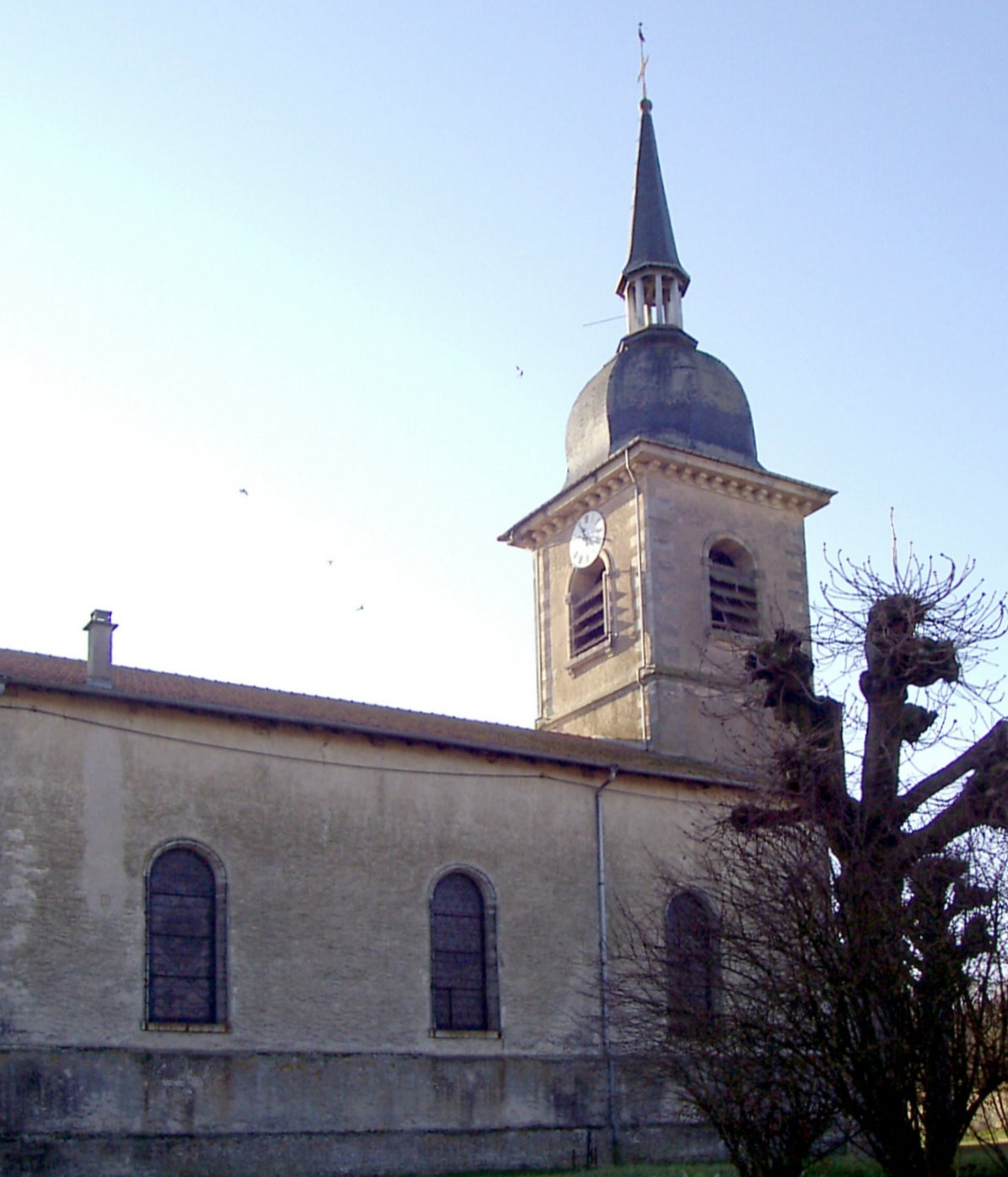
The church

In the commune, there is a 19th-century church and a chapel, Chapelle Notre-Dame de Pitié. There is also a 16th-century vicarage, renovated in the 19th century.

== See also ==
- Communes of the Meurthe-et-Moselle department
