= Légéville-et-Bonfays =

- Commune
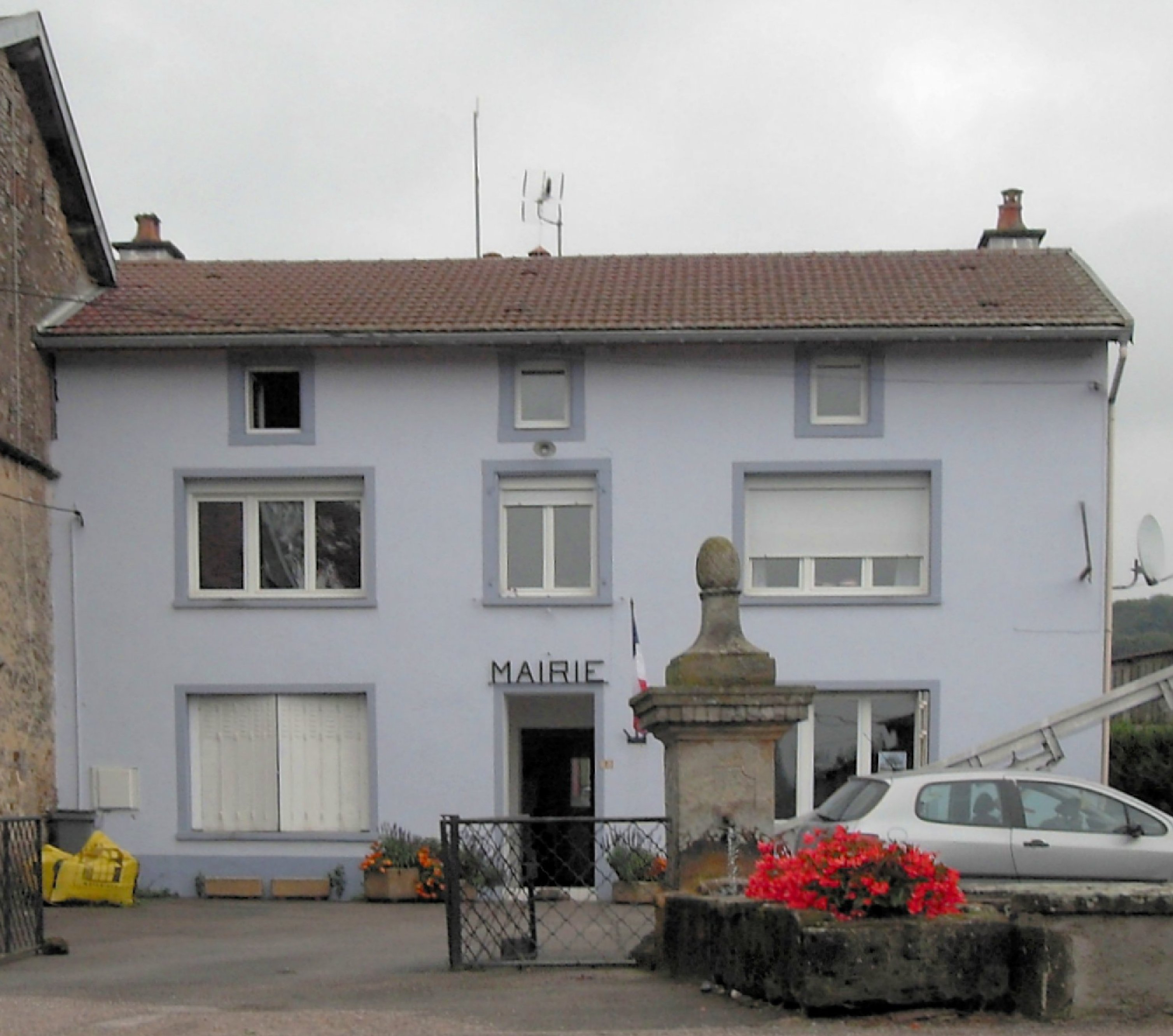
- The town hall in Légéville-et-Bonfays
- Location of Légéville-et-Bonfays
- Location within France Location within Grand Est
- Coordinates: 48°11′14″N 6°09′04″E
- Country: France
- Region: Grand Est
- Department: Vosges
- Arrondissement: Neufchâteau
- Canton: Darney
- Intercommunality: CC Mirecourt Dompaire

Government
  - Mayor (2020–2026): François Colin
- Area^{1}: 5.21 km^{2} (2.01 sq mi)
- Elevation: 300 m (980 ft)
- Highest elevation: 380 m (1,250 ft)
- Lowest elevation: 287 m (942 ft)
- Population (2023): 66
  - Density: 13/km^{2} (33/sq mi)
- Time zone: UTC+01:00 (CET)
  - Summer (DST): UTC+02:00 (CEST)
- INSEE/Postal code: 88264 /88270
- ^{1} French Land Register data, which excludes lakes, ponds, glaciers > 1 km^{2} (0.386 sq mi or 247 acres) and river estuaries.

Légéville-et-Bonfays (French pronunciation: [leʒevil e bɔ̃fɛj]) is a commune in the Vosges department in Grand Est in northeastern France.

== Geography ==
The river Madon flows through the commune.

== See also ==
- Communes of the Vosges department
