= Ceintrey =

- Commune
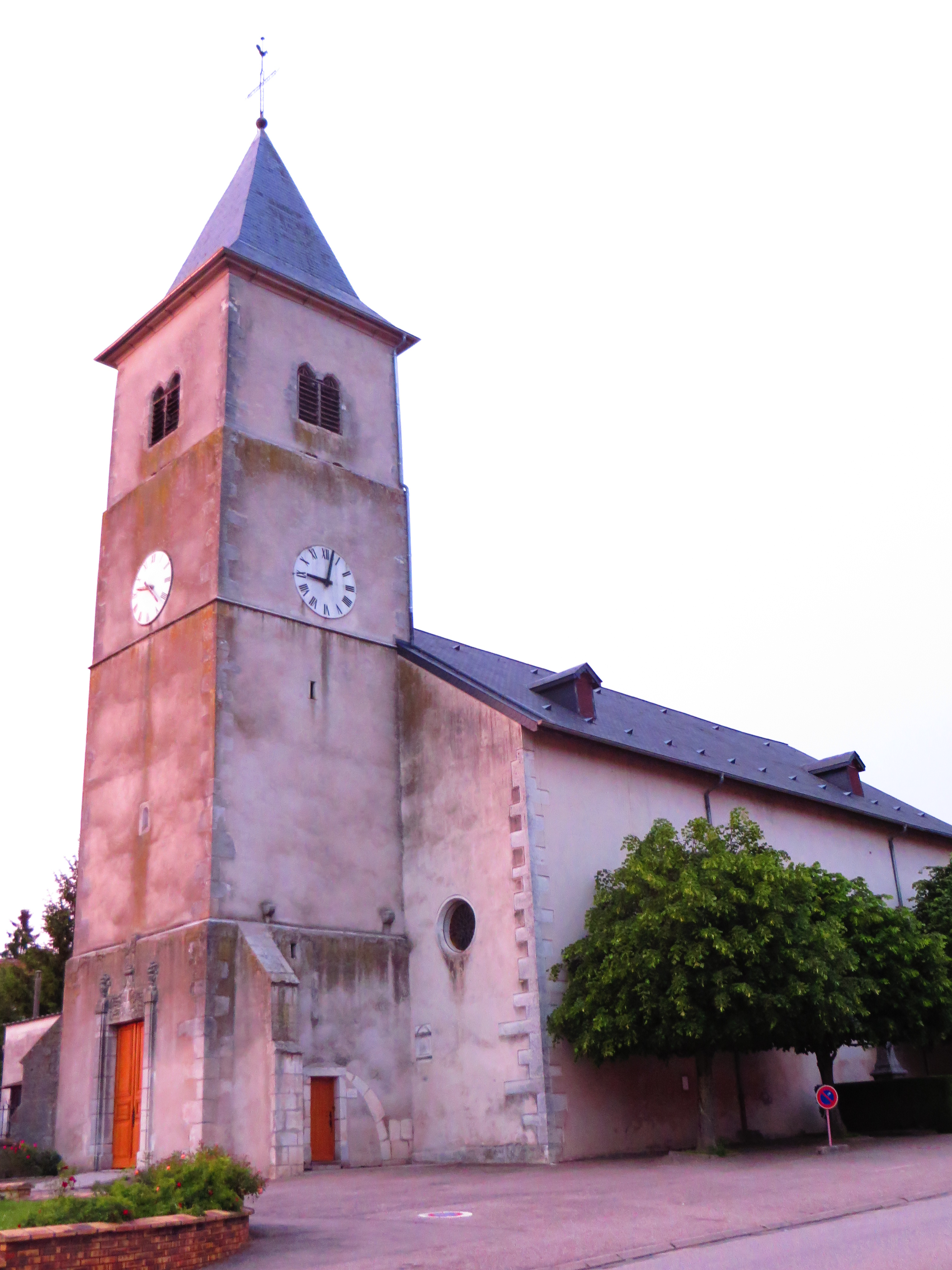
- The church in Ceintrey

- Coat of arms
- Location of Ceintrey
- Location within France Location within Grand Est
- Coordinates: 48°31′33″N 6°09′57″E
- Country: France
- Region: Grand Est
- Department: Meurthe-et-Moselle
- Arrondissement: Nancy
- Canton: Meine au Saintois
- Intercommunality: CC Pays du Saintois

Government
  - Mayor (2020–2026): Jean-Paul Robert
- Area^{1}: 11 km^{2} (4.2 sq mi)
- Elevation: 233 m (764 ft)
- Highest elevation: 376 m (1,234 ft)
- Lowest elevation: 229 m (751 ft)
- Population (2023): 889
  - Density: 81/km^{2} (210/sq mi)
- Time zone: UTC+01:00 (CET)
  - Summer (DST): UTC+02:00 (CEST)
- INSEE/Postal code: 54109 /54134
- ^{1} French Land Register data, which excludes lakes, ponds, glaciers > 1 km^{2} (0.386 sq mi or 247 acres) and river estuaries.

Ceintrey (French pronunciation: [sɛ̃tʁɛ]) is a commune in the Meurthe-et-Moselle department in north-eastern France.

== Geography ==
The river Madon flows through the commune.

== See also ==
- Communes of the Meurthe-et-Moselle department
