= Orme, Maryland =

Unincorporated community in Maryland, United States

- Unincorporated community
- Location within Maryland
- Coordinates: 38°38′33″N 76°45′56″W
- Country: United States
- State: Maryland
- County: Prince George's
- Elevation: 207 ft (63 m)
- Time zone: UTC-5 (Eastern (EST))
  - Summer (DST): UTC-4 (EDT)
- Area codes: 301 & 240
- GNIS feature ID: 597845

Orme is an Unincorporated community in Prince George's County, Maryland, United States.

A post office served the community from 1893 to 1914.
