= Hymont =

- Commune
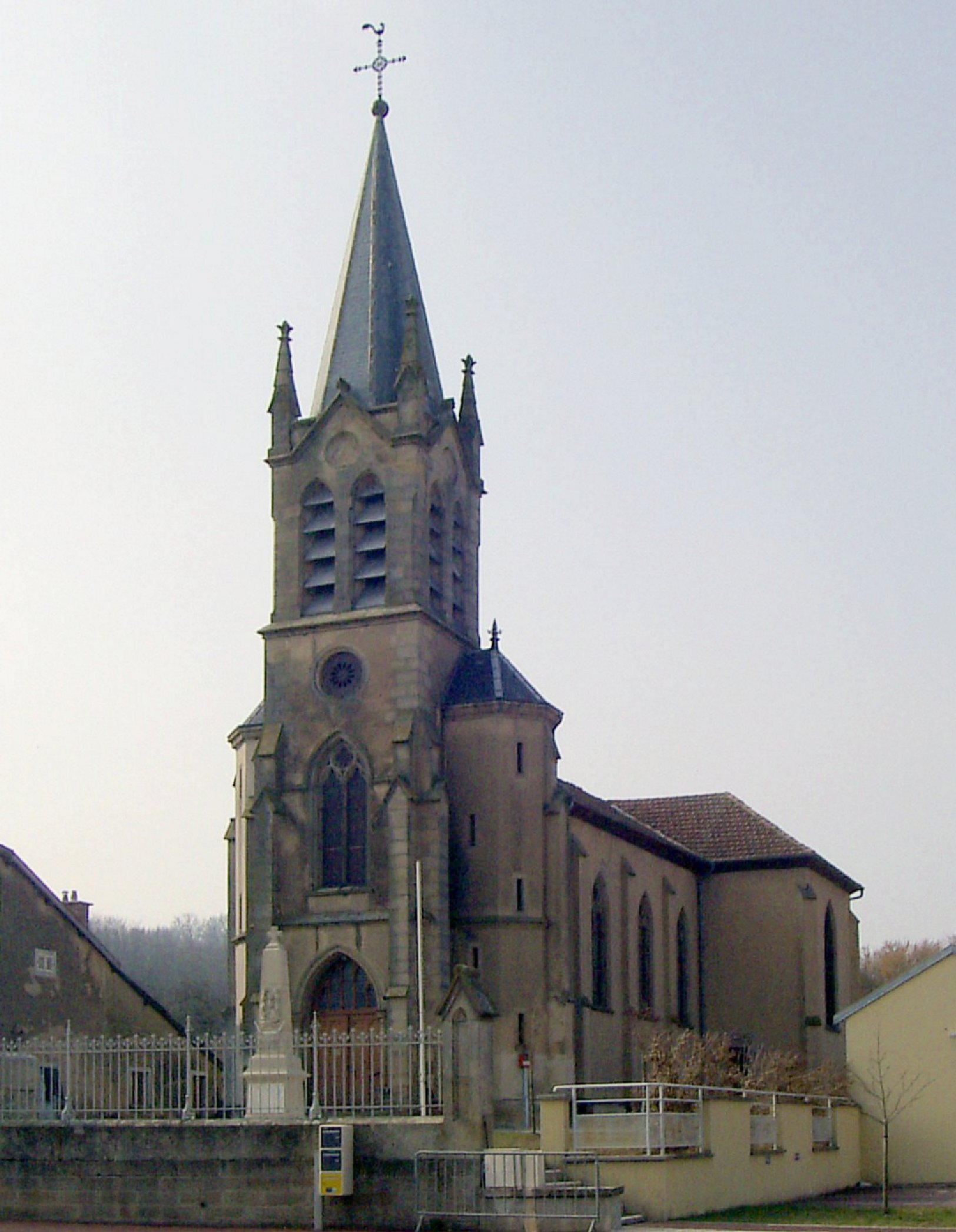
- The church in Hymont
- Location of Hymont
- Location within France Location within Grand Est
- Coordinates: 48°15′57″N 6°08′33″E
- Country: France
- Region: Grand Est
- Department: Vosges
- Arrondissement: Neufchâteau
- Canton: Mirecourt
- Intercommunality: CC Mirecourt Dompaire

Government
  - Mayor (2020–2026): Christine Rouyer
- Area^{1}: 4.17 km^{2} (1.61 sq mi)
- Elevation: 278 m (912 ft)
- Highest elevation: 353 m (1,158 ft)
- Lowest elevation: 270 m (890 ft)
- Population (2023): 491
  - Density: 118/km^{2} (305/sq mi)
- Time zone: UTC+01:00 (CET)
  - Summer (DST): UTC+02:00 (CEST)
- INSEE/Postal code: 88246 /88500
- ^{1} French Land Register data, which excludes lakes, ponds, glaciers > 1 km^{2} (0.386 sq mi or 247 acres) and river estuaries.

Hymont (French pronunciation: [imɔ̃]) is a commune in the Vosges department in Grand Est in northeastern France.

== Geography ==
The river Madon flows through the commune.

== See also ==
- Communes of the Vosges department
