= Orm (given name) =

Orm is a given name usually of Scandinavian origin.

People with the given name include:

- Orrm or Orrmin (12th century), the author of the Ormulum
- Orm Eriksson (c.1476–1521), Norwegian nobleman, executed for involvement in a tax revolt
- Orm Finnendahl (born 1963), German composer
- Orm Fowler (1891–1963), Australian rules footballer, played for Fitzroy and St Kilda
- Orm Øverland (born 1965), Norwegian literary historian and Slavist
- Orm Pleasents (1882–1946), Australian rules footballer, played for Collingwood
- Orm Saunders (1907–1978), Australian rules footballer, played for North Melbourne
- Orm Storolfsson (fl. AD 1000), Icelandic strongman

== Fictional ==
- Orm Embar, a dragon in Ursula K. Le Guin's Earthsea.
- Orm Tostesson, lead character in Frans Bengtsson's The Long Ships

== See also ==
- Orrm, author of the Ormulum, a 12th-century Christian text
- Orm, who commissioned the Kirkdale sundial in 11th century England
- Orme (name)
