= Orme's law =

Orme's law is a rule of thumb to assist modelers when they design an electric power system for their radio-controlled model. Orme's law simply recommends the use of one NiMH rechargeable battery cell for every 35 square inches (230 cm^{2}) of wing area for sport planes. One cell for every 50 square inches (320 cm^{2}) of wing area for trainers. When using LiPo cells with higher voltage, the number of cells is cut in half, since a LiPo cell has double the voltage.

== Origin ==
This rule is the work of Matthew Orme, who used to manage the sales of Aveox's line of motors to the hobby market, and later developed a small high performance line of brushless motors at RazorMotors. Matt wanted to come up with a simpler way to recommend systems to the many people who ask him for advice powering their models. Brushless motors are very versatile and it can be hard for newcomers to decide which system they should use.

== Need for Orme's law ==
The main purpose was to demonstrate to the modeler that the electric motor was not the source of power like an internal combustion engine. With an IC engine, a particular sized engine will have a particular power output. Typically a model airplane manufacturer will recommend a 2-cycle glow plug motor by its size (typically .40-.60 cubic inch for the average sized plane) Since electric motors operate over a much wider range, there was no good way to recommend an electric motor for a plane.

Orme's law makes it clear that the battery pack is the power source, and it determines the available power, not the electric motor. Once the power requirements of any particular airplane model have been determined, an electric motor can be chosen to match the power source. i.e., a 10 cell NiMh battery pack produces approximately 1 volt per cell under load. At 30 amps, that translates to .4 HP.

== System selection ==
Matt Orme's rule makes system selection easy. Orme's law assumes that the hobbyist will be using 1700 to 2000 mAH cells and will prop for 4 minutes of flight, or 30 amps. 2000 mAH = 2 amp hours or 120 amp minutes, hence the 4-minute flight time (120 amp-minutes /30 amps) at full throttle, with increasing flight times at reduced throttle settings.

Applying the rule using a hobbyist's Citabria Pro electric conversion, which has 560 square inches (3,600 cm^{2}) of wing area, it needs exactly 16 cells according to Orme's law. Before Orme's law, much more work was needed to design the power for the system.
