= Orme (name) =

Orme is both a surname and a given name.

== Surname ==
- Orme (surname)

== Given name ==
- Orme G. Stuart (1914–1990), Canadian businessman and naval officer
- Sir David Orme Masson (1858–1937), English scientist
- Leslie Orme Wilson (1876–1955), British soldier and politician
- Richard Wilberforce, Baron Wilberforce (1907–2003), British barrister and judge
- Christopher Orme Plummer (1929–2021), Canadian actor

== See also ==
- Orm (given name)
