= Ormes-et-Ville =

- Commune
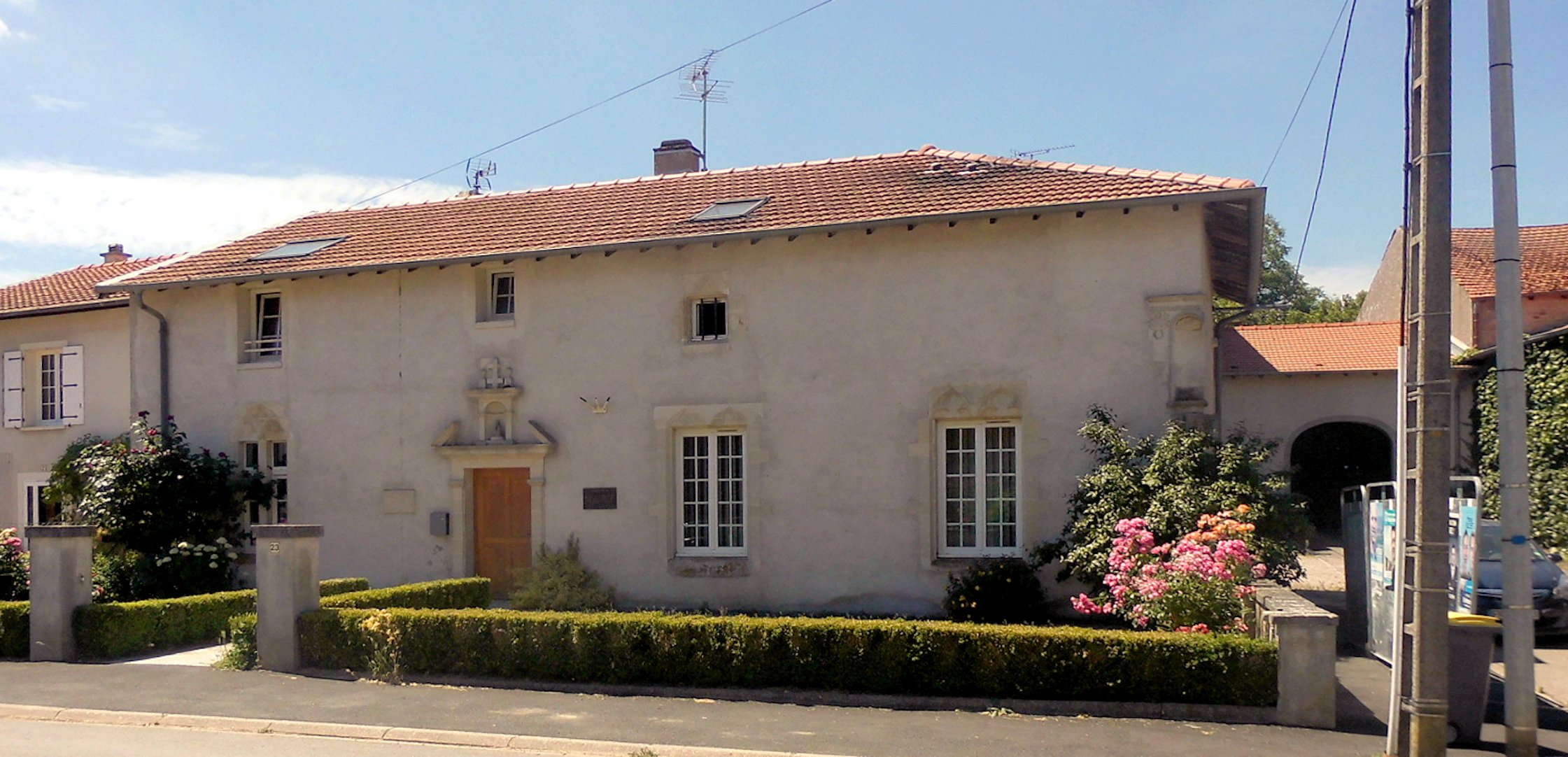
- The town hall in Ormes-et-Ville

- Coat of arms
- Location of Ormes-et-Ville
- Location within France Location within Grand Est
- Coordinates: 48°29′19″N 6°12′13″E
- Country: France
- Region: Grand Est
- Department: Meurthe-et-Moselle
- Arrondissement: Nancy
- Canton: Meine au Saintois
- Intercommunality: CC Pays du Saintois

Government
  - Mayor (2020–2026): Gilbert Godfroy
- Area^{1}: 12.49 km^{2} (4.82 sq mi)
- Elevation: 305 m (1,001 ft)
- Highest elevation: 333 m (1,093 ft)
- Lowest elevation: 234 m (768 ft)
- Population (2023): 218
  - Density: 17.5/km^{2} (45.2/sq mi)
- Time zone: UTC+01:00 (CET)
  - Summer (DST): UTC+02:00 (CEST)
- INSEE/Postal code: 54411 /54740
- ^{1} French Land Register data, which excludes lakes, ponds, glaciers > 1 km^{2} (0.386 sq mi or 247 acres) and river estuaries.

Ormes-et-Ville (French pronunciation: [ɔʁm e vil]) is a commune in the Meurthe-et-Moselle department in north-eastern France.

== Geography ==
The river Madon flows through the commune.

== See also ==
- Communes of the Meurthe-et-Moselle department
