= Canton of Lamarche =

Coordinates: 48°4′8″N 5°46′50″E

Lamarche
- Former canton
- Interactive map of Lamarche
- Country: France
- Region: Grand Est
- Department: Vosges
- No. of communes: {{{nbcomm}}}
- Disbanded: 2015
- Area: 168.16 km^{2} (64.93 sq mi)
- Population (2012): 4,543
  - Density: 27.02/km^{2} (69.97/sq mi)

The Canton of Lamarche is a former French administrative and electoral grouping of communes in the Vosges département of eastern France and in the region of Lorraine. It was disbanded following the French canton reorganisation which came into effect in March 2015. It consisted of 26 communes, which joined the canton of Darney in 2015. It had 4,543 inhabitants (2012).

One of 9 cantons in the Arrondissement of Neufchâteau, the Canton of Lamarche had its administrative centre at Lamarche.

== Composition ==
The Canton of Lamarche comprised the following 26 communes:

- Ainvelle
- Blevaincourt
- Châtillon-sur-Saône
- Damblain
- Fouchécourt
- Frain
- Grignoncourt
- Isches
- Lamarche
- Les Thons
- Lironcourt
- Marey
- Martigny-les-Bains
- Mont-lès-Lamarche
- Morizécourt
- Robécourt
- Rocourt
- Romain-aux-Bois
- Rozières-sur-Mouzon
- Saint-Julien
- Senaide
- Serocourt
- Serécourt
- Tignécourt
- Tollaincourt
- Villotte
