= Communauté de communes des Marches de Lorraine =

The Communauté de communes des Marches de Lorraine is a French former administrative association of rural communes in the Vosges département of eastern France and on the south-western edge of the region of Lorraine. It was merged into the new Communauté de communes des Vosges côté Sud-Ouest in January 2017.

Created in December 2003, the association had its administrative offices at Lamarche.

== Composition ==
The Communauté de communes comprised the following communes:

1. Ainvelle
2. Blevaincourt
3. Damblain
4. Fouchécourt
5. Frain
6. Isches
7. Lamarche
8. Marey
9. Martigny-les-Bains
10. Mont-lès-Lamarche
11. Morizécourt
12. Robécourt
13. Rocourt
14. Romain-aux-Bois
15. Rozières-sur-Mouzon
16. Senaide
17. Serécourt
18. Serocourt
19. Tollaincourt
20. Villotte

== Responsibilities ==
The Association of Lamarche communes has the following responsibilities:

- Management of public spaces
- Economic Development
- Environmental protection and improvement
- Management of public spaces
- Housing
- Quality of life
- Construction, development and operation of cultural and sporting facilities together with primary school and kindergartens
- Technical support for highway maintenance
