= Lamarche =

Lamarche or LaMarche may refer to:

== People ==
- Béatrice Lamarche (born 1998), Canadian speed skater
- Ben Lamarche (born 1966), Canadian speed skater
- Bertrand Lamarche (born 1966), French artist
- Bernard Lamarche-Vadel (1949–2000), French writer, art critic and collector
- Caroline Lamarche (born 1955), Belgian writer
- Charles Lamarche (1850–1909), Canadian politician
- Christophe Lamarche-Ledoux, Canadian musician and composer
- Claire Lamarche (born 1945), Canadian broadcaster and television host
- Enzo Lamarche (born 1997), Argentine footballer
- François Joseph Drouot de Lamarche (1733–1814), French military general
- Gara LaMarche (born 1954), American philanthropist, writer and executive
- Jacques Baudry de Lamarche (1676–c. 1738), New French colonist
- Jean Lamarche (born 1972), Canadian politician
- Marguerite Lamarche (1638–1706), French midwife
- Marie-Pierre Lamarche (born 1968), Canadian speed skater
- Maurice LaMarche (born 1958), Canadian voice actor
- Nicole Lamarche (born 1978), American beauty pageant contestant and Christian minister
- Pat LaMarche (born 1960), American politician, activist and journalist
- Paul-Émile Lamarche (1881–1918), Canadian lawyer and politician
- Pierre Lamarche (born 1947), Canadian tennis player and coach
- Ulric Lamarche (1867–1921), Canadian painter

== Places ==
- Canton of Lamarche, a former canton of France
- Lamarche, Quebec, a village in Canada
- Lamarche-sur-Saône, a commune of France
- Lamarche, Vosges, a commune of France
- Mont-lès-Lamarche, a commune of France
- Nonsard-Lamarche, a commune of France

== Other ==
- Domaine Lamarche, a winery in France
