= Martigny-les-Bains =

Commune in Vosges department, Grand Est, France

- Commune
- Coat of arms
- Location of Martigny-les-Bains
- Location within France Location within Grand Est
- Coordinates: 48°06′23″N 5°49′26″E
- Country: France
- Region: Grand Est
- Department: Vosges
- Arrondissement: Neufchâteau
- Canton: Darney
- Intercommunality: CC Vosges côté Sud-Ouest

Government
  - Mayor (2020–2026): Didier Humbert
- Area^{1}: 29.22 km^{2} (11.28 sq mi)
- Elevation: 369 m (1,211 ft)
- Highest elevation: 490 m (1,610 ft)
- Lowest elevation: 342 m (1,122 ft)
- Population (2023): 807
  - Density: 27.6/km^{2} (71.5/sq mi)
- Time zone: UTC+01:00 (CET)
  - Summer (DST): UTC+02:00 (CEST)
- INSEE/Postal code: 88289 /88320
- ^{1} French Land Register data, which excludes lakes, ponds, glaciers > 1 km^{2} (0.386 sq mi or 247 acres) and river estuaries.

Martigny-les-Bains (French pronunciation: [maʁtiɲi le bɛ̃]) is a commune in the Vosges department in Grand Est in northeastern France.

It acquired its present name only in 1880s, before which it was called Martigny-lès-Lamarche. The modern name highlights the thermal springs and spa facilities which remain a defining feature of the place.

Inhabitants are called Octoduriens.

== Geography ==
Martigny-les-Bains is positioned in the south-west of Grand Est and at the western end of the Vosges Plain, forty kilometres (twenty-five miles) to the south of the administrative centre of the arrondissement, Neufchâteau, approximately six kilometres (four miles) to the north-east of Lamarche, and twenty-two kilometres to the north of another noted spa town, Bourbonne-les-Bains ("Aquae borvonis" in Roman times).

The village occupies a sheltered plateau. On the higher ground forests of oak and beech alternate with conifer plantations. The village is protected by the topography from the worst extremes of wind and temperature.

The railway which since 1881 has provided a connection with Vittel and Contrexéville skirts the village on its north-western side. Some fifteen kilometres to the west the Autoroute A31 offers access to the autoroute network for the age of mass motorisation, while five kilometres to the east, roughly parallel with the autoroute and the railway line, the remnants of a Roman road provide evidence that the district has been much transited over many centuries.

The altitude above sea level at the station is 370 meters, equivalent to 114 meters higher than the valley of the Saône at Les Thons, just fourteen kilometres (nine miles) to the south-south-east. The commune is close to the watershed that separates the catchment areas of the rivers Saône and Meuse. The commune includes within its confines the sources of the Anger and Mouzon rivers which set off in opposite directions before they connect between Pompierre and Circourt after about thirty kilometres (nineteen miles). The valley of the Mouzon, which sets off in a westerly direction before turning to the north, flows over relatively flat plateau land rather than in some form of a gorge: claims appropriate to a spa village are made for the health giving properties of the air here.

== History ==
Following the successive wars against France that characterised the seventeenth century, the village consisted of two parts, namely Martigny-Saint-Remy and Martigny-Saint-Pierre. The nearby village of Saint-Pierre had been destroyed by the Swedes, who were in the pay of France at this time: the inhabitants turned up as refugees in Martigny-Saint-Remy and constructed the quarter which became known as Martigny-Saint-Pierre, including a church of which the remains survived until recently.

== See also ==
- Communes of the Vosges department
