= Rocourt =

Rocourt may refer to:

- Rocourt, Jura, municipality of Jura in Switzerland
- Rocourt, Liège, district of the city of Liège, Wallonia in Belgium
  - Stade Vélodrome de Rocourt, a former multi-use stadium
- Rocourt-Saint-Martin, municipality of Aisne in France
- Rocourt, Vosges, municipality of Vosges in France
