= Provenchères-lès-Darney =

- Commune
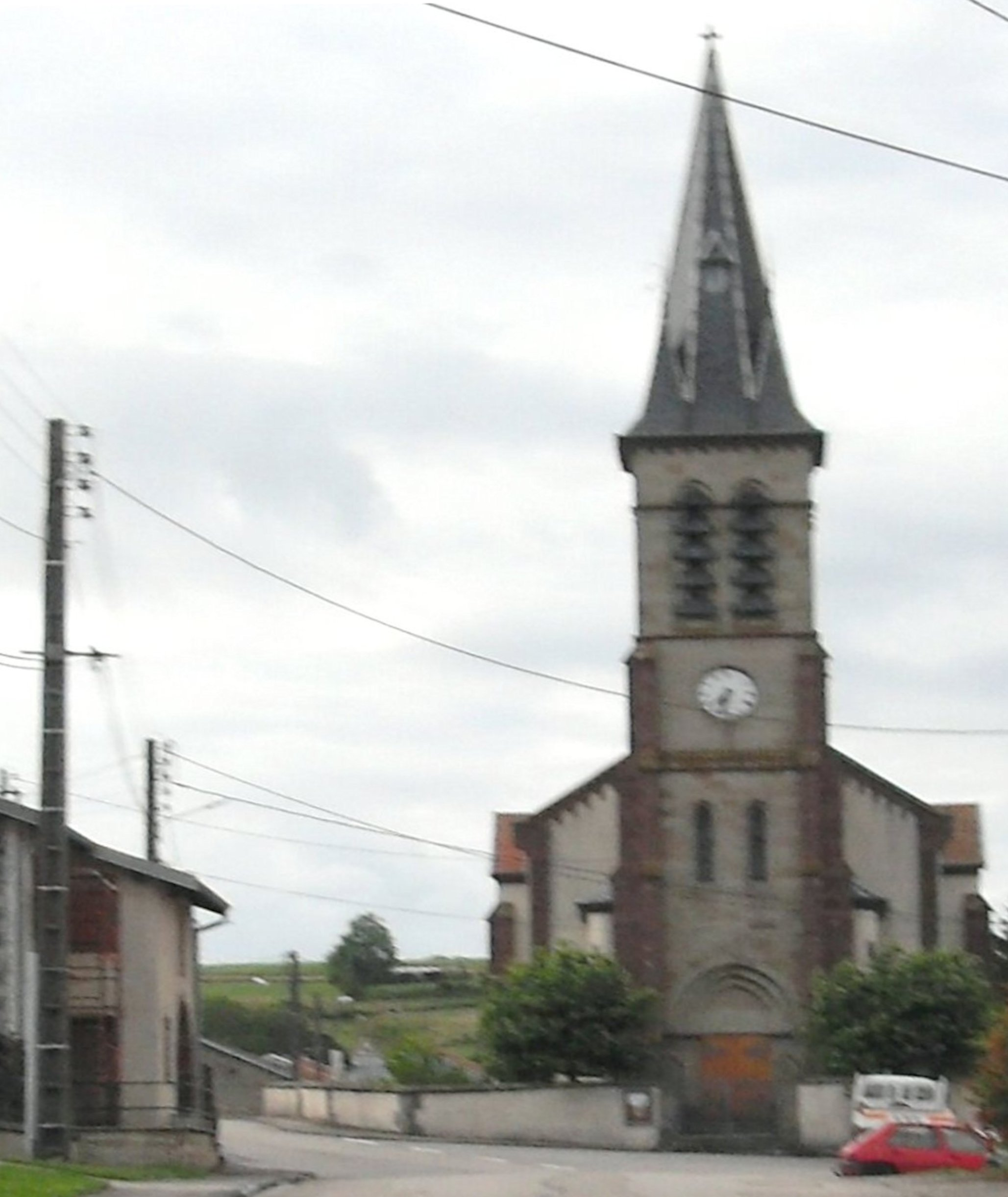
- The church in Provenchères-lès-Darney
- Location of Provenchères-lès-Darney
- Location within France Location within Grand Est
- Coordinates: 48°07′45″N 5°57′27″E
- Country: France
- Region: Grand Est
- Department: Vosges
- Arrondissement: Neufchâteau
- Canton: Darney
- Intercommunality: CC Vosges côté Sud-Ouest

Government
  - Mayor (2020–2026): René Thiery
- Area^{1}: 9.07 km^{2} (3.50 sq mi)
- Elevation: 369 m (1,211 ft)
- Highest elevation: 459 m (1,506 ft)
- Lowest elevation: 320 m (1,050 ft)
- Population (2023): 143
  - Density: 15.8/km^{2} (40.8/sq mi)
- Time zone: UTC+01:00 (CET)
  - Summer (DST): UTC+02:00 (CEST)
- INSEE/Postal code: 88360 /88260
- ^{1} French Land Register data, which excludes lakes, ponds, glaciers > 1 km^{2} (0.386 sq mi or 247 acres) and river estuaries.

Provenchères-lès-Darney (French pronunciation: [pʁɔvɑ̃ʃɛʁ lɛ daʁnɛ], literally Provenchères near Darney) is a commune in the Vosges department in Grand Est in northeastern France.

It lies 8 kilometres (5 mi) to the south of Vittel and to the northwest of Darney.

== History ==
The name "De Provincheriis" is recorded from 1136: this originates with the Latin word "proventus" which may refer to the fruitfulness of the land here.

In the medieval period Provenchères came under the Bassigny bailiwick and the provostship of Lamarche: subsequently it fell within the bailiwick of Lamarche. On the spiritual side, the commune was a part of the deanery of Vittel in the Diocese of Toul.

The lordship of Provenchères was in the possession of the Barons of Deuilly and the Abbey of Luxeuil who received half of the tithe income.

By a decree of 22 May 1867 the name of the commune was changed from Provenchères to Provenchères-lès-Darney in order to avoid confusion with Provenchères-en-Vosges (which subsequently underwent a name change of its own).

== See also ==
- Communes of the Vosges department
