= Dombrot-le-Sec =

- Commune
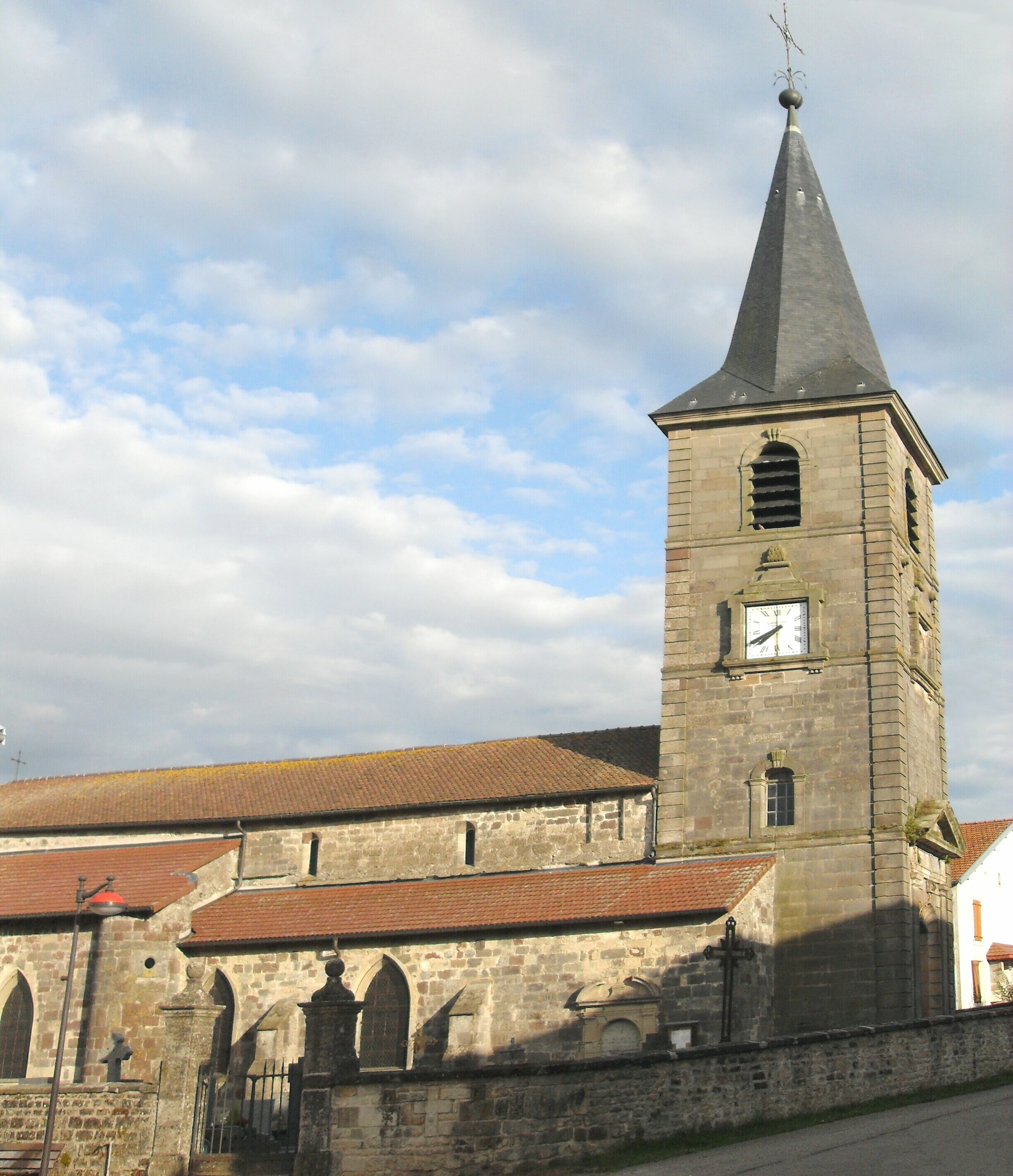
- Saint-Brice

- Coat of arms
- Location of Dombrot-le-Sec
- Location within France Location within Grand Est
- Coordinates: 48°08′47″N 5°54′39″E
- Country: France
- Region: Grand Est
- Department: Vosges
- Arrondissement: Neufchâteau
- Canton: Vittel
- Intercommunality: CC Vosges côté Sud-Ouest

Government
  - Mayor (2020–2026): Bernard Salquèbre
- Area^{1}: 18.89 km^{2} (7.29 sq mi)
- Highest elevation: 485 m (1,591 ft)
- Lowest elevation: 357 m (1,171 ft)
- Population (2023): 355
  - Density: 18.8/km^{2} (48.7/sq mi)
- Time zone: UTC+01:00 (CET)
  - Summer (DST): UTC+02:00 (CEST)
- INSEE/Postal code: 88140 /88140
- ^{1} French Land Register data, which excludes lakes, ponds, glaciers > 1 km^{2} (0.386 sq mi or 247 acres) and river estuaries.

Dombrot-le-Sec (French pronunciation: [dɔ̃bʁo lə sɛk]) is a commune in the Vosges department in Grand Est in northeastern France. The Anger river rises in it.

== See also ==
- Communes of the Vosges department
