= Rollainville =

- Part of Neufchâteau
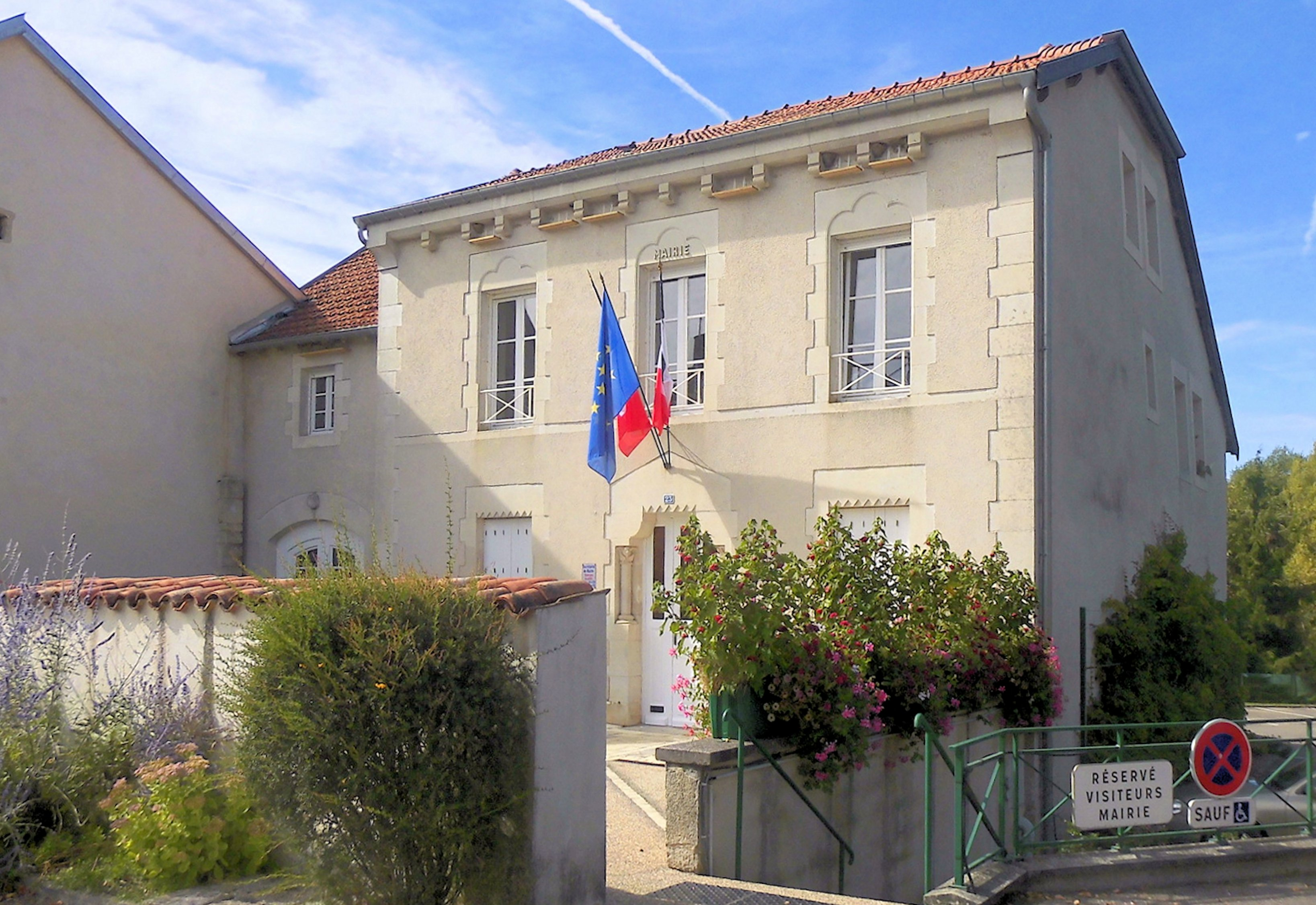
- The town hall in Rollainville
- Location of Rollainville
- Location within France Location within Grand Est
- Coordinates: 48°21′45″N 5°44′23″E
- Country: France
- Region: Grand Est
- Department: Vosges
- Arrondissement: Neufchâteau
- Canton: Neufchâteau
- Commune: Neufchâteau
- Area^{1}: 8.13 km^{2} (3.14 sq mi)
- Elevation: 315 m (1,033 ft)
- Highest elevation: 410 m (1,350 ft)
- Lowest elevation: 300 m (980 ft)
- Population (2022): 306
  - Density: 37.6/km^{2} (97.5/sq mi)
- Time zone: UTC+01:00 (CET)
  - Summer (DST): UTC+02:00 (CEST)
- Postal code: 88300
- ^{1} French Land Register data, which excludes lakes, ponds, glaciers > 1 km^{2} (0.386 sq mi or 247 acres) and river estuaries.

Rollainville (French pronunciation: [ʁɔlɛ̃vil]) is a former commune in the Vosges department in Grand Est in northeastern France. On 1 January 2025, it was merged into the commune of Neufchâteau.

== Climate ==
On average, Rollainville experiences 69.2 days per year with a minimum temperature below 0 °C (32.0 °F), 3.3 days per year with a minimum temperature below −10 °C (14.0 °F), 12.2 days per year with a maximum temperature below 0 °C (32.0 °F), and 11.0 days per year with a maximum temperature above 30 °C (86.0 °F). The record high temperature was 39.6 °C (103.3 °F) on July 25, 2019, while the record low temperature was −18.2 °C (−0.8 °F) on December 20, 2009.

Climate data for Rollainville (1991–2020 normals, extremes 2006–present)
Month	Jan	Feb	Mar	Apr	May	Jun	Jul	Aug	Sep	Oct	Nov	Dec	Year
Record high °C (°F)	14.2 (57.6)	21.3 (70.3)	24.6 (76.3)	27.3 (81.1)	32.5 (90.5)	36.1 (97.0)	39.6 (103.3)	36.6 (97.9)	33.0 (91.4)	27.2 (81.0)	21.7 (71.1)	15.9 (60.6)	39.6 (103.3)
Mean daily maximum °C (°F)	4.7 (40.5)	6.0 (42.8)	10.9 (51.6)	15.7 (60.3)	18.6 (65.5)	22.6 (72.7)	25.2 (77.4)	24.0 (75.2)	20.2 (68.4)	14.8 (58.6)	9.2 (48.6)	5.5 (41.9)	14.8 (58.6)
Daily mean °C (°F)	2.1 (35.8)	2.9 (37.2)	6.2 (43.2)	10.1 (50.2)	13.1 (55.6)	16.9 (62.4)	19.2 (66.6)	18.4 (65.1)	14.8 (58.6)	10.8 (51.4)	6.2 (43.2)	3.0 (37.4)	10.3 (50.6)
Mean daily minimum °C (°F)	−0.5 (31.1)	−0.3 (31.5)	1.4 (34.5)	4.5 (40.1)	7.7 (45.9)	11.3 (52.3)	13.2 (55.8)	12.7 (54.9)	9.3 (48.7)	6.8 (44.2)	3.3 (37.9)	0.5 (32.9)	5.8 (42.5)
Record low °C (°F)	−13.8 (7.2)	−16.4 (2.5)	−8.8 (16.2)	−4.7 (23.5)	−2.0 (28.4)	0.7 (33.3)	4.5 (40.1)	3.6 (38.5)	0.2 (32.4)	−6.4 (20.5)	−11.5 (11.3)	−18.2 (−0.8)	−18.2 (−0.8)
Average precipitation mm (inches)	80.7 (3.18)	68.1 (2.68)	63.8 (2.51)	52.1 (2.05)	79.3 (3.12)	70.0 (2.76)	57.1 (2.25)	83.1 (3.27)	59.0 (2.32)	74.3 (2.93)	79.3 (3.12)	93.5 (3.68)	860.3 (33.87)
Average precipitation days (≥ 1.0 mm)	13.4	11.1	9.6	8.0	11.2	9.9	8.7	10.4	8.0	10.5	11.8	13.5	126.1
Source: Meteociel

== See also ==
- Communes of the Vosges department
