= Neufchâteau, Vosges =

Neufchâteau
- Subprefecture and commune
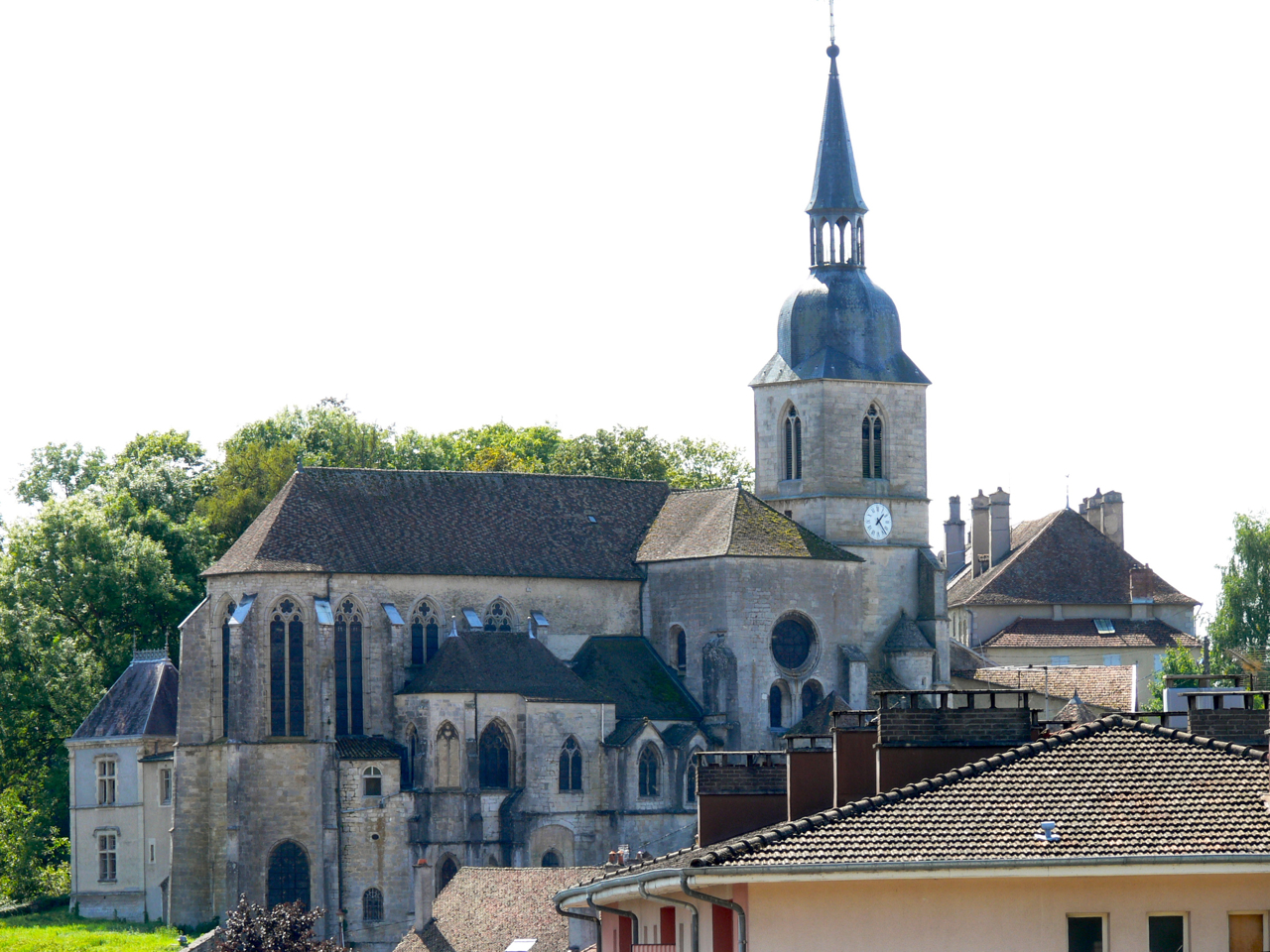
- The Church of St. Nicolas

- Flag Coat of arms
- Location of Neufchâteau
- Location within France Location within Grand Est
- Coordinates: 48°21′23″N 5°41′47″E
- Country: France
- Region: Grand Est
- Department: Vosges
- Arrondissement: Neufchâteau
- Canton: Neufchâteau
- Intercommunality: CC Ouest Vosgien

Government
  - Mayor (2025–2026): Simon Leclerc
- Area^{1}: 31.94 km^{2} (12.33 sq mi)
- Elevation: 289 m (948 ft)
- Highest elevation: 410 m (1,350 ft)
- Lowest elevation: 274 m (899 ft)
- Population (2023): 6,732
  - Density: 210.8/km^{2} (545.9/sq mi)
- Time zone: UTC+01:00 (CET)
  - Summer (DST): UTC+02:00 (CEST)
- INSEE/Postal code: 88321 /88300
- ^{1} French Land Register data, which excludes lakes, ponds, glaciers > 1 km^{2} (0.386 sq mi or 247 acres) and river estuaries.

Neufchâteau (French pronunciation: [nøʃɑto] or [nœfʃɑto]) is a commune in the Vosges department in Grand Est in northeastern France. On 1 January 2025, the former commune of Rollainville was merged into Neufchâteau.

== Geography ==
Positioned at the confluence of the rivers Meuse and Mouzon, the little town dominates the Vosges Plain. It is at the centre of the various communications channels in the south-west of Grand Est, connecting with the région of Champagne to the west.

The A31 Autoroute loops around the east side of Neufchâteau, approximately 20 kilometres (12 mi) away at its closest point. Four junctions are available according to subsequent destination, these being numbered 8.1, 9, 10 and 11 and being located respectively at Robécourt, Bulgnéville, Châtenois and Colombey-les-Belles.

National Road RN74 (in parts downgraded following autoroute network development to Departmental Road RD674) passes through Neufchâteau en route from Nancy in the north-east to Dijon further to the south-west.

The town is on a main railway line connecting with Metz, Nancy, Dijon, Lyon and the south. For a year, in 2006/07, it also found itself a stop on the TGV line to Nice, though the opening of a more direct line put an end to that.

== History ==
One of the oldest towns in Lorraine, Neufchâteau was known as Noviomagus during the Roman period, when it was a market town along the Pretorian road connecting Lyon with Trier. Other names from this period include Noviomagus and Neomagus, which had mutated to Novum Castrum by 1094 when Thierry, son of the Duke Gérard I constructed a castle here.

Writing in the twelfth century, Hugues Metellus described the town in his poem "Garin le Lohérain" as "large and well populated, with a large fortress and abundant wealth" (« grande et bien peuplée, ayant un chastel principal, des biens en abondance »). It contained all the ingredients necessary for a good time, including musicians, jugglers and actors. In 1231 Neufchâteau was the first town in Lorraine to receive town privileges. Duke Matthew II granted Neufchâteau a charter which included the right to appoint thirteen people to undertake the functions of a jury, and to elect a mayor. The town was regularly chosen to host conferences convened in order to settle differences arising between Lorraine and France. It was also to Neufchâteau that the Duchess of Lorraine, at this time the regent on behalf of her infant son, called a meeting of the Estates General in 1545.

The final decades of the neighbouring Duchy of Burgundy had been a particularly troubled period for Lorraine, and as a principal administrative centre, Neufchâteau had been badly hit by the fighting, being invaded and occupied by a Burgundian garrison in 1436 and again in 1476.

After the fall of Burgundy, French influence over Lorraine turned into control. Richelieu saw to the destruction of the town walls at Neufchâteau, which became formally French along with the rest of Lorraine in 1766 with the death of Duke Stanislas. Three decades later, with the new administrative structure introduced across France in the aftermath of the revolution, the town found itself the capital of the Vosges arrondissement. Such was its importance that at the height of the revolutionary fervour it lost its name, mutating from Neufchâteau to Mouzon-Meuse. The town regained its former name as the political temperature cooled, but during the ensuing two centuries it found itself occupied by foreign troops during the Napoleonic Wars, during the Franco-Prussian War of 1870, and more recently during the Second World War.

During the final decades of the nineteenth century and the early ones of the twentieth, Neufchâteau was home to an equestrian Republican Guard (France) brigade.

On 19 June 1940 around 100 French soldiers, most of them members of the Twelfth Regiment of Senegalese Fusiliers were shot by German troops in a barn near to Neufchâteau.

In 1965 the commune merged with those of adjacent Noncourt and of Rouceux.

More recently the town hit the headlines when it became the first French commune to renounce its water treatment contract with a large multinational organisation, and take water management back into municipal control.

=== Heraldry ===

Current (left) and former (right) coats of arms of Neufchâteau

== Population ==
Inhabitants are called Néocastriens in French. Population data refer to the area corresponding with the commune as of January 2025.

Historical population
Year	Pop.	±% p.a.
1968	8,206	—
1975	9,002	+1.33%
1982	8,619	−0.62%
1990	8,100	−0.77%
1999	7,859	−0.34%
2007	7,383	−0.78%
2012	6,948	−1.21%
2017	6,970	+0.06%
2023	6,732	−0.58%
Source: INSEE

== Twin towns ==
- Hamm, Germany, since 1975 formerly with the now incorporated municipality Herringen since 1967
- Miranda do Corvo, Portugal, since 1997
- Smigiel, Poland, since 2001

Neufchâteau was part of the 1998 summit of worldwide cities named "New Castle" with:

Neuburg an der Donau, Germany
Neuchâtel, Switzerland
Neufchâteau, Vosges, France
(United States) New Castle, Delaware, USA
(United States) New Castle, Indiana, USA
(United States) New Castle, Pennsylvania, USA
Newcastle-under-Lyme, England
Newcastle upon Tyne, England
Newcastle, KwaZulu-Natal, South Africa
Shinshiro, Japan

== See also ==
- Communes of the Vosges department
