= Marguerite Lamarche =

French midwife (1638–1706)

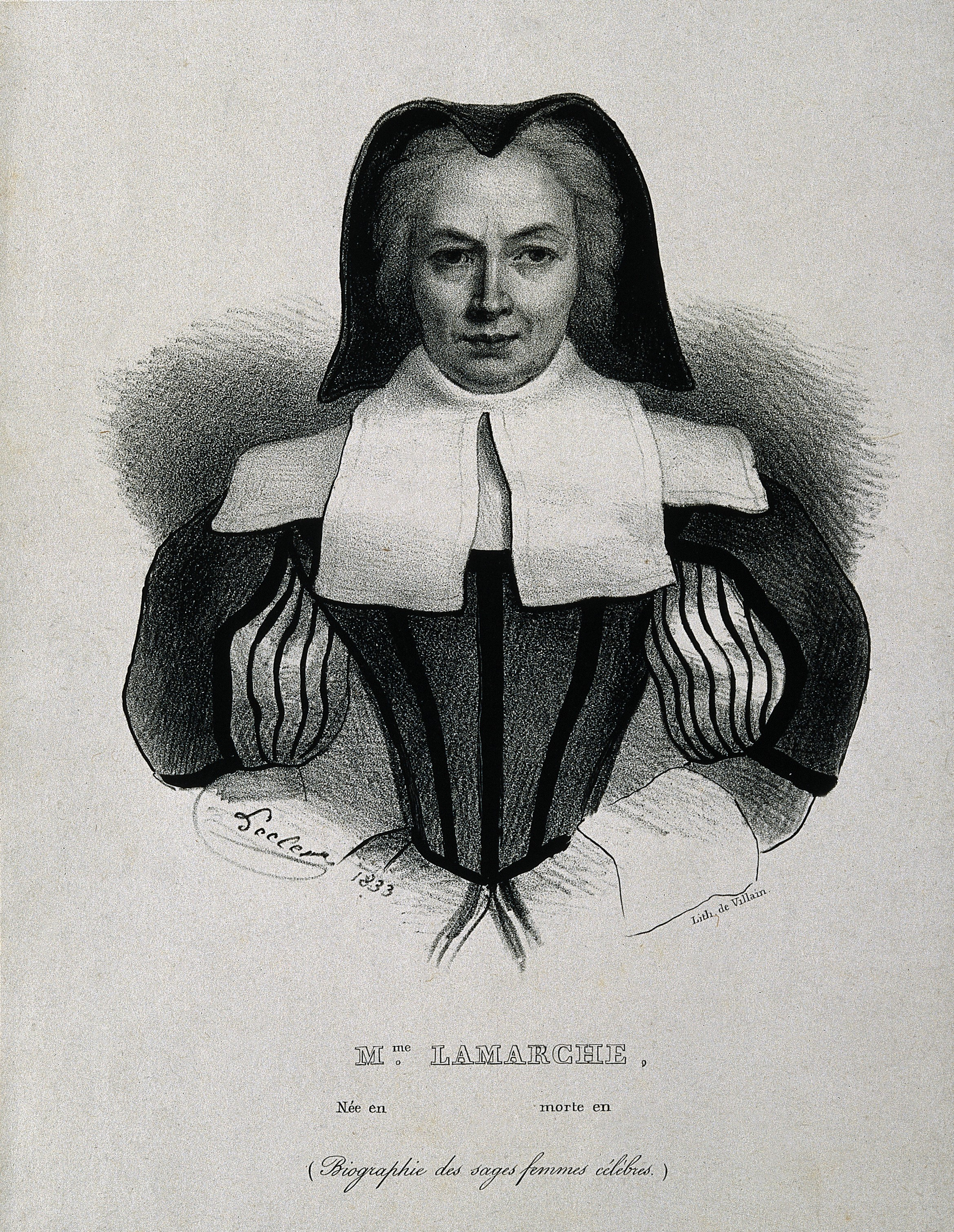
Lithograph of Lamarche by A. T. Leclerc (1833)

Marguerite du Tertre de Lamarche (1638–1706) was a French midwife.

Marguerite Dutertre was born in 1638 to a poor family in Paris, and was orphaned at an early age. She was brought up by a woman named LaTouche, who acted as a mother to her. She was intending to become a nun until meeting a nurse from the Hôtel-Dieu, Paris who inspired her to take up midwifery. She attended classes at the Hôtel-Dieu, studying midwifery, anatomy and medicine. She married Jean Didiot, sieur de Lamarche when she was aged 23, and a year later became the head midwife of the Hôtel-Dieu, teaching students. At the request of the administrators of the Hôtel-Dieu, she produced her book on the principles of midwifery, D'instructions familières et très-faciles, faites par questions et réponses touchant toutes les choses principales qu une sagefemme doit savoir pour Vexercice de son art. (Familiar and very easy instructions, made up of questions and answers, touching on all the main things that a midwife must know to practice her art.) in the form of a series of questions and answers. It was published in 1677 and dedicated to the jurist Guillaume de Lamoignon, marquis de Basville.

Her book D'instructions familières ... has been said to be "the first medical textbook written by a woman in Europe" ("den första medicinska läroboken skriven av en kvinna i Europa"), but Louise Bourgeois, known as La Boursier, has also been described as "the first female author in [France] to publish a medical text", as her Observations diverses sur la stérilité, perte de fruict, foecondité, accouchements et maladies des femmes et enfants nouveaux naiz (Various observations on sterility, loss of fruit, fecundity, childbirth and illnesses of women and newly born children) was published in three volumes from 1609 onwards.

Lamarche's book was divided into three sections:

- "les choses que la sage-femme doit savoir, qui précèdent l'accouchement" ("things the midwife needs to know before childbirth")
- "les choses qui arrivent dans le temps de l'accouchement, dont la sage-femme doit avoir connaissance" ("things that happen during childbirth, of which the midwife must be aware")
- "les choses qui suivent l'accouchement, dont la connaissance est nécessaire à la sagefemme" ("things that follow childbirth, knowledge of which is necessary for the midwife").

It was originally published in 1677, and a second edition, with additional material by Louise Boursier, was published in 1710.

Lamarche died in Paris in 1706.

== Publications ==
- D'instructions familières et très-faciles, faites par questions et réponses touchant toutes les choses principales qu une sagefemme doit savoir pour l'exercice de son art. (Familiar and very easy instructions, made up of questions and answers, touching on all the main things that a midwife must know to practice her art.) Published 1677. Second edition, 1710, with additional material by Louise Boursier, printed by Laurent d'Houry Second edition available online via Gallica
