= Mouzon (river) =

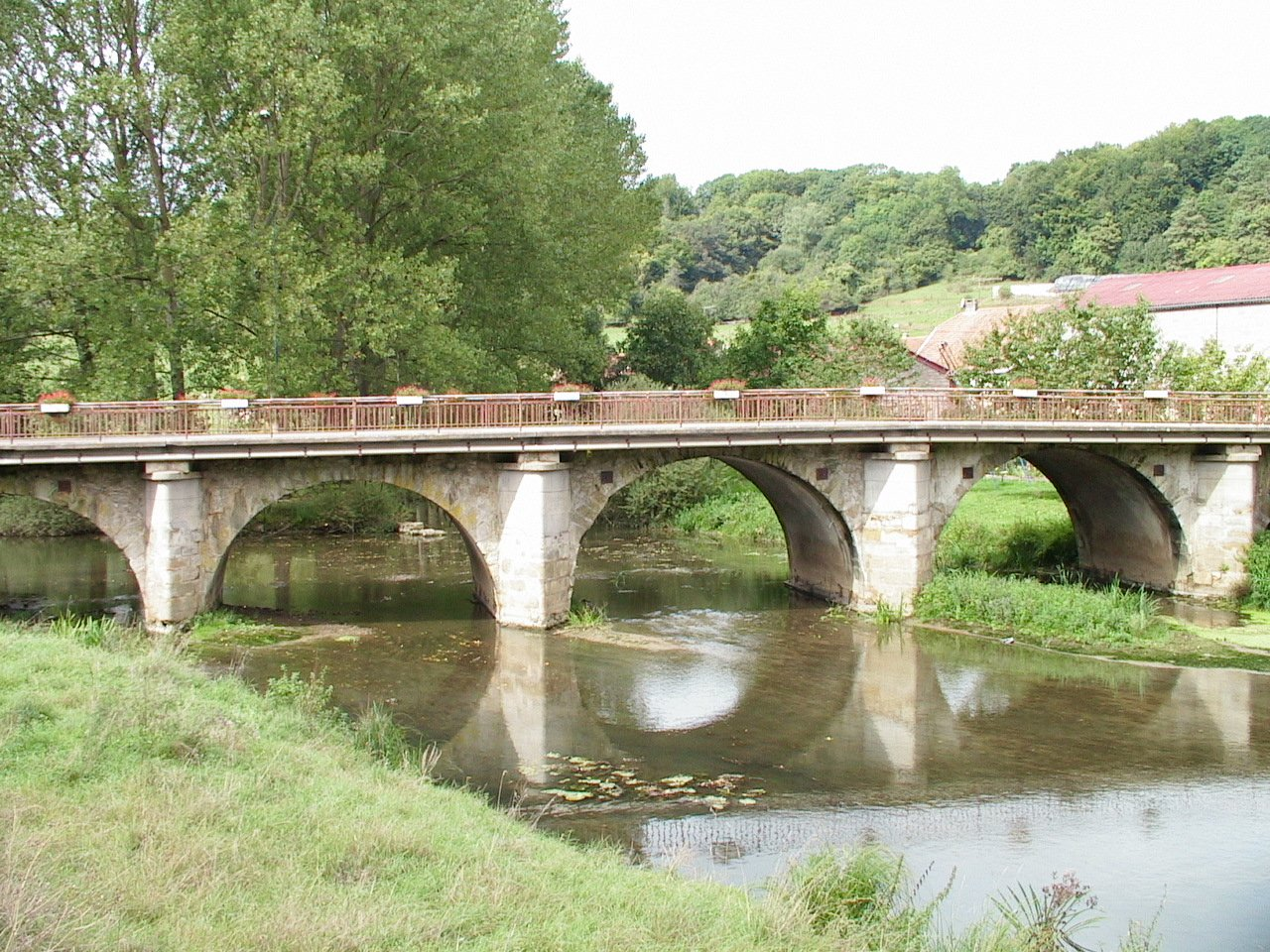

- Location within France Location within Grand Est

Location
- Country: France

Physical characteristics
- Source
  - location: near Serocourt, Vosges
  - coordinates: 48°07′11″N 5°52′24″E
- Mouth: Meuse
  - location: Neufchâteau
  - coordinates: 48°21′18″N 5°41′05″E
- Length: 63.3 km (39.3 mi)
- Basin size: 414 km^{2} (160 sq mi)

Basin features
- Progression: Meuse→ North Sea

The Mouzon (French pronunciation: [muzɔ̃]) is a 63.3-kilometre (39.3 mi) river that traverses the departments Vosges and Haute-Marne in the region Grand Est, in northeastern France. It rises in Serocourt and flows west then north to join the Meuse at Neufchâteau. Its longest tributary is the Anger.
