= Anger (river) =

- Location within France Location within Grand Est

Location
- Country: France

Physical characteristics
- Source
  - location: near Dombrot-le-Sec, Vosges
- Mouth
  - location: Mouzon in Circourt-sur-Mouzon
  - coordinates: 48°16′57″N 5°41′59″E
- Length: 27.9 km (17.3 mi)
- Basin size: 233 km^{2} (90 sq mi)

Basin features
- Progression: Mouzon→ Meuse→ North Sea

The Anger (French pronunciation: [ɑ̃ʒe]) is a 27.9 km long river in northeastern France which traverses Vosges in Grand Est. It rises in Dombrot-le-Sec and flows generally northwest to join the Mouzon at Circourt-sur-Mouzon.
