= Claire Lamarche =

Canadian television personality

Claire Lamarche (born June 28, 1945) is a television personality in Quebec, Canada.

She was born in Quebec City and grew up there. She studied sociology at university and then began a career in teaching. She later decided to work in television. Lamarche began work as a researcher and later was host for the popular program Droit de parole on Radio-Québec for eight years. She then joined the TVA network where she hosted a daily show Claire Lamarche for more than 12 years. She was also host of the television program Les Retrouvailles which reunited adopted children with their birth parents.

Lamarche had suffered from sudden drops in blood pressure and fainting since she was young. In 1997, she collapsed on live television during a debate between national party leaders. These health problems have since been addressed with a pacemaker.

She married actor Guy Messier who died in February 2012.

She received the Prix Gémeaux for best host in 1987, 1991 and 1992 as well as several MetroStar Awards and a Prix Artis in 2006. Lamarche was inducted into the Canadian Broadcast Hall of Fame in 2003.
