= Tignécourt =

- Commune
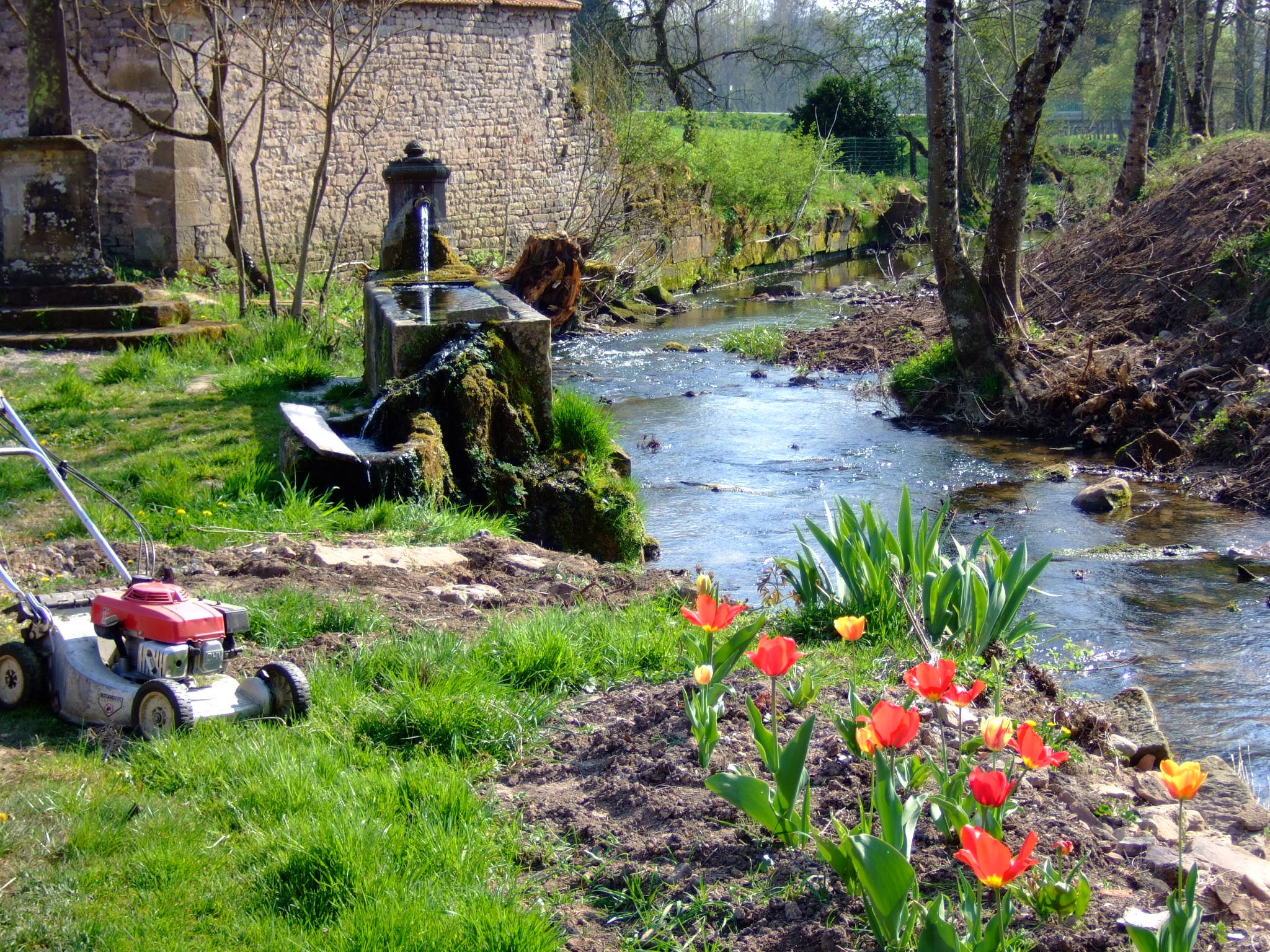
- Spring on the Sâle
- Location of Tignécourt
- Location within France Location within Grand Est
- Coordinates: 48°02′39″N 5°53′38″E
- Country: France
- Region: Grand Est
- Department: Vosges
- Arrondissement: Neufchâteau
- Canton: Darney
- Intercommunality: CC Vosges côté Sud-Ouest

Government
  - Mayor (2020–2026): Hervé Destrignéville
- Area^{1}: 18.97 km^{2} (7.32 sq mi)
- Elevation: 312 m (1,024 ft)
- Highest elevation: 373 m (1,224 ft)
- Lowest elevation: 242 m (794 ft)
- Population (2023): 80
  - Density: 4.2/km^{2} (11/sq mi)
- Time zone: UTC+01:00 (CET)
  - Summer (DST): UTC+02:00 (CEST)
- INSEE/Postal code: 88473 /88320
- ^{1} French Land Register data, which excludes lakes, ponds, glaciers > 1 km^{2} (0.386 sq mi or 247 acres) and river estuaries.

Tignécourt (French pronunciation: [tiɲekuʁ]) is a commune in the Vosges department in Grand Est in northeastern France.

== See also ==
- Communes of the Vosges department
