= Rozières-sur-Mouzon =

- Commune
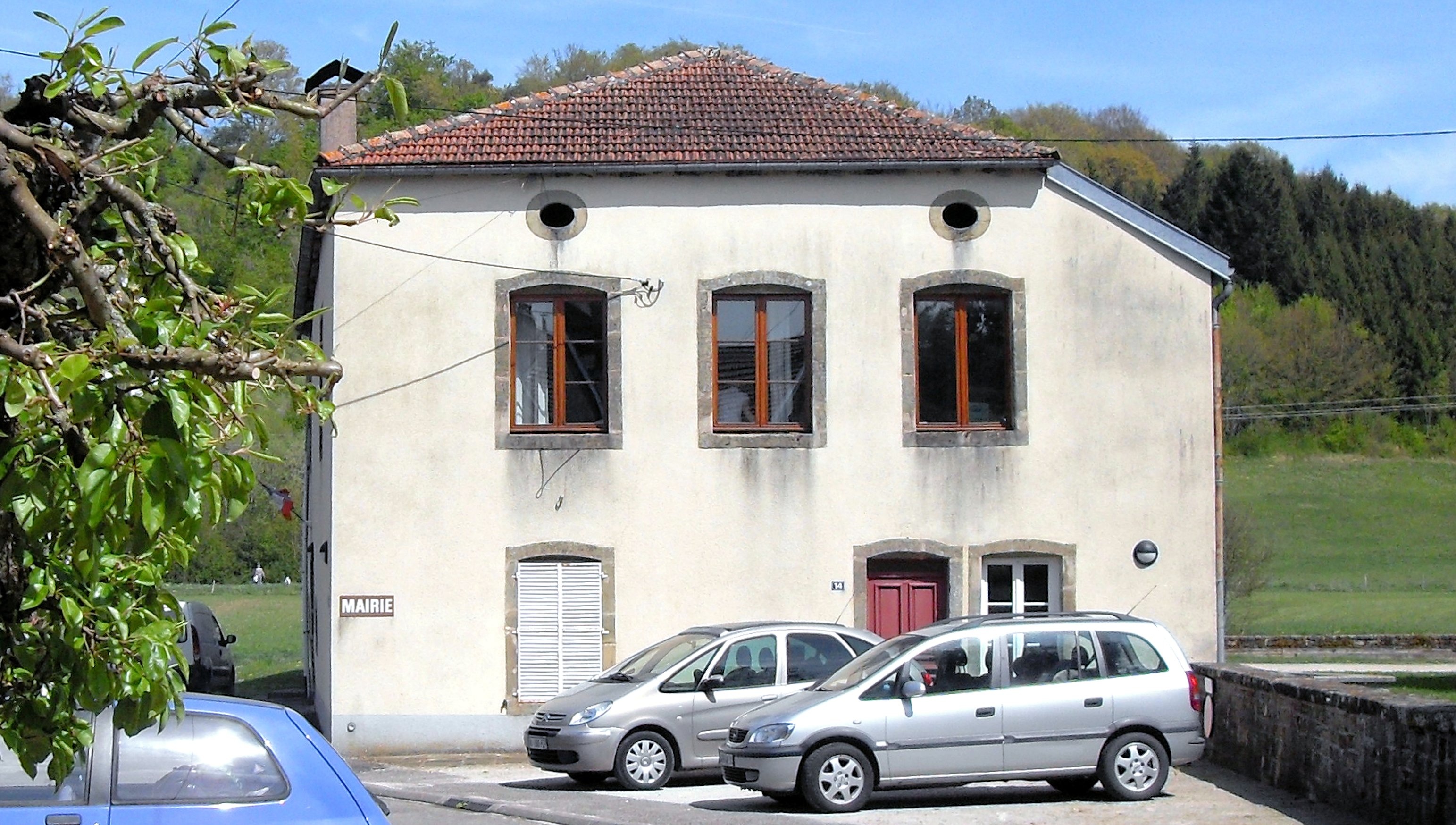
- The town hall in Rozières-sur-Mouzon

- Coat of arms
- Location of Rozières-sur-Mouzon
- Location within France Location within Grand Est
- Coordinates: 48°07′15″N 5°42′24″E
- Country: France
- Region: Grand Est
- Department: Vosges
- Arrondissement: Neufchâteau
- Canton: Darney
- Intercommunality: CC Vosges côté Sud-Ouest

Government
  - Mayor (2020–2026): Serge Andelot
- Area^{1}: 4.78 km^{2} (1.85 sq mi)
- Elevation: 333 m (1,093 ft)
- Highest elevation: 406 m (1,332 ft)
- Lowest elevation: 330 m (1,080 ft)
- Population (2023): 69
  - Density: 14/km^{2} (37/sq mi)
- Time zone: UTC+01:00 (CET)
  - Summer (DST): UTC+02:00 (CEST)
- INSEE/Postal code: 88404 /88320
- ^{1} French Land Register data, which excludes lakes, ponds, glaciers > 1 km^{2} (0.386 sq mi or 247 acres) and river estuaries.

Rozières-sur-Mouzon (French pronunciation: [ʁozjɛʁ syʁ muzɔ̃], literally Rozières on Mouzon) is a commune in the Vosges department in Grand Est in northeastern France.

== See also ==
- Communes of the Vosges department
