= Châtillon-sur-Saône =

- Commune
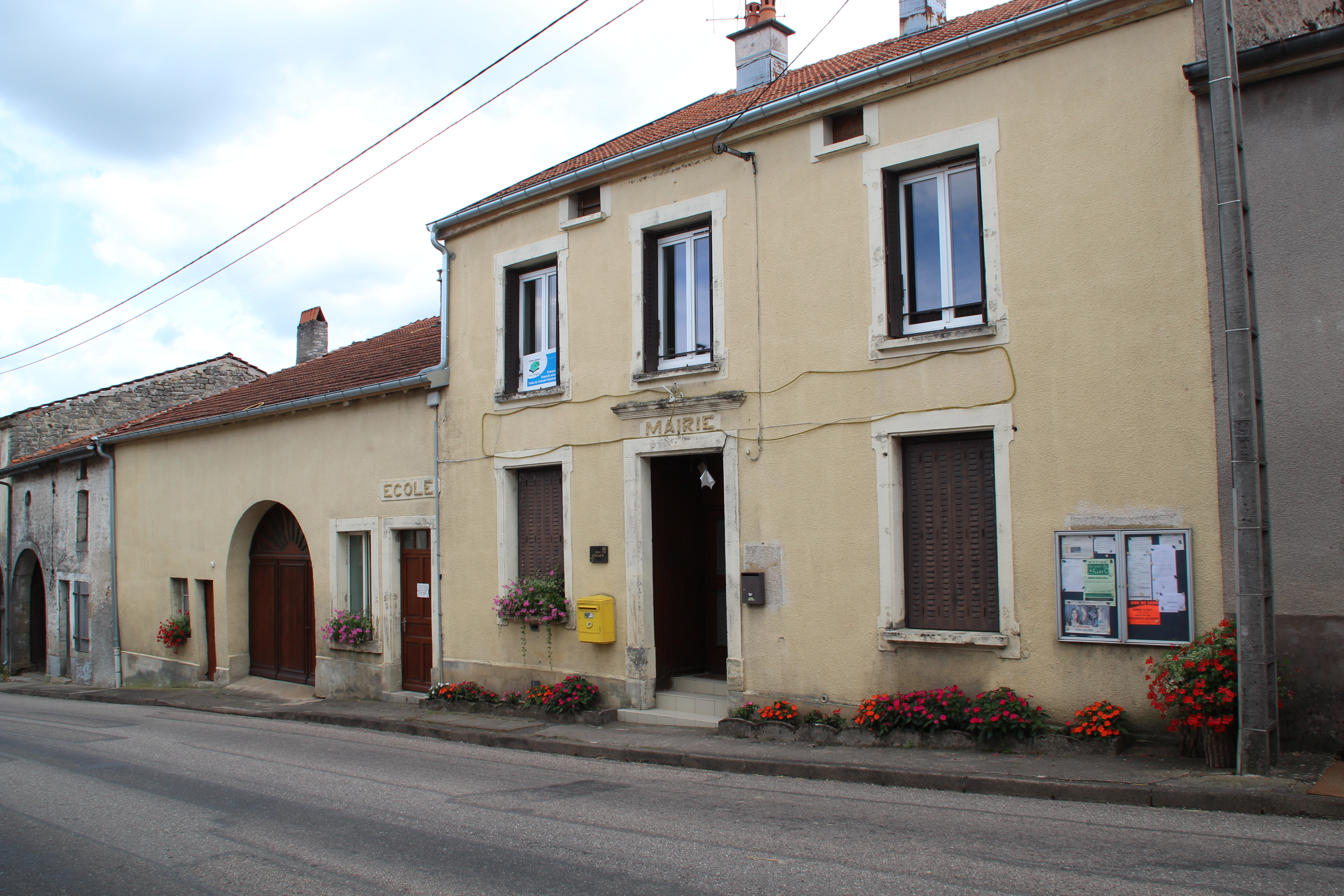
- The town hall in Châtillon-sur-Saône

- Coat of arms
- Location of Châtillon-sur-Saône
- Location within France Location within Grand Est
- Coordinates: 47°56′56″N 5°53′06″E
- Country: France
- Region: Grand Est
- Department: Vosges
- Arrondissement: Neufchâteau
- Canton: Darney
- Intercommunality: CC Vosges côté Sud-Ouest

Government
  - Mayor (2020–2026): Jean-Marie Guillaumey
- Area^{1}: 9.21 km^{2} (3.56 sq mi)
- Highest elevation: 398 m (1,306 ft)
- Lowest elevation: 229 m (751 ft)
- Population (2023): 105
  - Density: 11.4/km^{2} (29.5/sq mi)
- Time zone: UTC+01:00 (CET)
  - Summer (DST): UTC+02:00 (CEST)
- INSEE/Postal code: 88096 /88410
- ^{1} French Land Register data, which excludes lakes, ponds, glaciers > 1 km^{2} (0.386 sq mi or 247 acres) and river estuaries.

Châtillon-sur-Saône (French pronunciation: [ʃatijɔ̃ syʁ son], literally Châtillon on Saône) is a commune in the Vosges department in Grand Est in northeastern France.

== See also ==
- Communes of the Vosges department
