= Ulric Lamarche =

Canadian artist

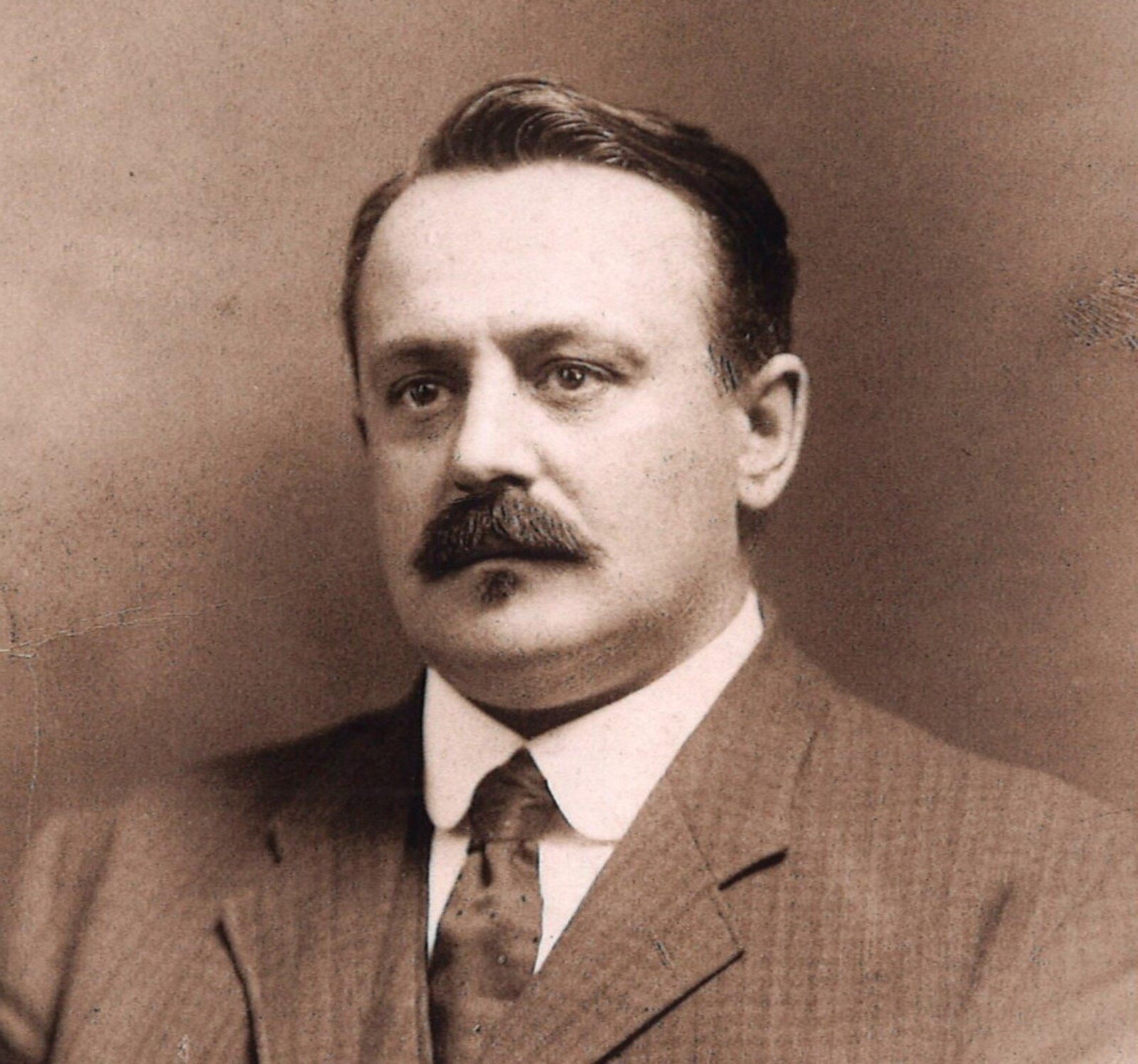
- Born: December 15, 1867; Oakland, California
- Died: February 9, 1921 (aged 53); Montreal, Quebec

Ulric Lamarche (1867 – 1921) was an American-born Canadian painter.

Born in California in 1867, his family moved to Mascouche, Quebec around 1874. By 1891 Lamarche had moved to Paris, where he studied art at the Académie Colarossi and the Académie Julian. He eventually returned to Montreal, where he remained until his death.

His 1912 portrait of Charles Marcil is included in the Canadian House of Commons Portrait Gallery. His work is included in the collection of the Musée national des beaux-arts du Québec.
