= Blevaincourt =

- Commune
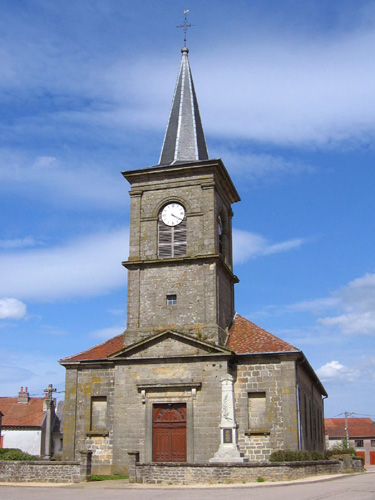
- The church in Blevaincourt
- Location of Blevaincourt
- Location within France Location within Grand Est
- Coordinates: 48°07′34″N 5°40′55″E
- Country: France
- Region: Grand Est
- Department: Vosges
- Arrondissement: Neufchâteau
- Canton: Darney
- Intercommunality: CC Vosges côté Sud-Ouest

Government
  - Mayor (2020–2026): Régine Kubot
- Area^{1}: 8.75 km^{2} (3.38 sq mi)
- Elevation: 375 m (1,230 ft)
- Highest elevation: 417 m (1,368 ft)
- Lowest elevation: 328 m (1,076 ft)
- Population (2023): 90
  - Density: 10/km^{2} (27/sq mi)
- Time zone: UTC+01:00 (CET)
  - Summer (DST): UTC+02:00 (CEST)
- INSEE/Postal code: 88062 /88320
- ^{1} French Land Register data, which excludes lakes, ponds, glaciers > 1 km^{2} (0.386 sq mi or 247 acres) and river estuaries.

Blevaincourt (French pronunciation: [bləvɛ̃kuʁ] or [blevɛ̃kuʁ]; also Blévaincourt) is a commune in the Vosges department in Grand Est in northeastern France.

== See also ==
- Communes of the Vosges department
