= Isches =

- Commune
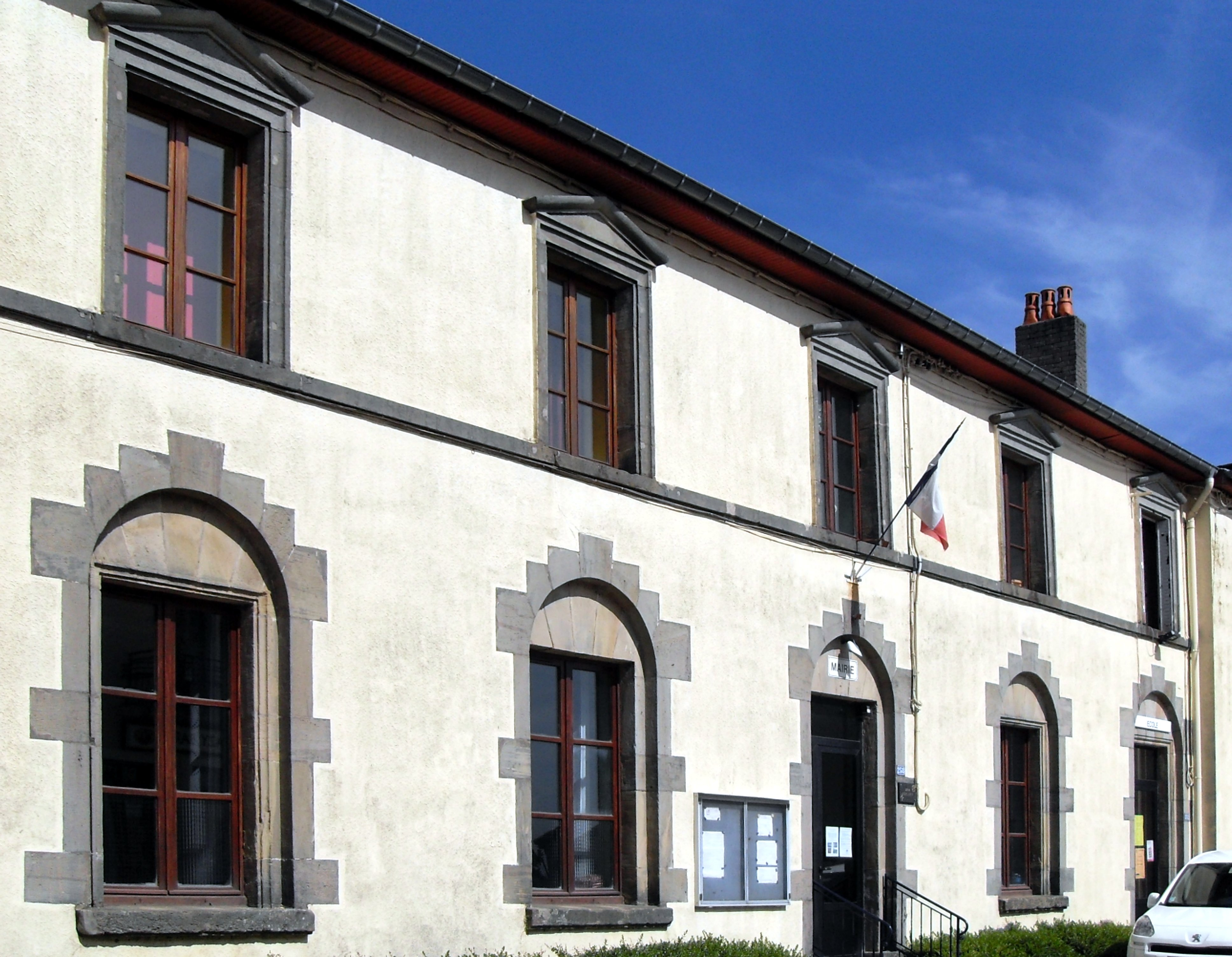
- The town hall in Isches
- Location of Isches
- Location within France Location within Grand Est
- Coordinates: 48°01′05″N 5°49′50″E
- Country: France
- Region: Grand Est
- Department: Vosges
- Arrondissement: Neufchâteau
- Canton: Darney
- Intercommunality: CC Vosges côté Sud-Ouest

Government
  - Mayor (2020–2026): Daniel Garcin
- Area^{1}: 13.6 km^{2} (5.3 sq mi)
- Elevation: 310 m (1,020 ft)
- Highest elevation: 483 m (1,585 ft)
- Lowest elevation: 265 m (869 ft)
- Population (2023): 176
  - Density: 12.9/km^{2} (33.5/sq mi)
- Time zone: UTC+01:00 (CET)
  - Summer (DST): UTC+02:00 (CEST)
- INSEE/Postal code: 88248 /88320
- ^{1} French Land Register data, which excludes lakes, ponds, glaciers > 1 km^{2} (0.386 sq mi or 247 acres) and river estuaries.

Isches (French pronunciation: [iʃ]) is a commune in the Vosges department in Grand Est in northeastern France.

== See also ==
- Communes of the Vosges department
