= Villotte =

- Commune
- Location of Villotte
- Location within France Location within Grand Est
- Coordinates: 48°06′03″N 5°46′30″E
- Country: France
- Region: Grand Est
- Department: Vosges
- Arrondissement: Neufchâteau
- Canton: Darney
- Intercommunality: CC Vosges côté Sud-Ouest

Government
  - Mayor (2020–2026): Jean-Luc Munière
- Area^{1}: 8.21 km^{2} (3.17 sq mi)
- Elevation: 344 m (1,129 ft)
- Highest elevation: 448 m (1,470 ft)
- Lowest elevation: 338 m (1,109 ft)
- Population (2023): 116
  - Density: 14.1/km^{2} (36.6/sq mi)
- Time zone: UTC+01:00 (CET)
  - Summer (DST): UTC+02:00 (CEST)
- INSEE/Postal code: 88510 /88320
- ^{1} French Land Register data, which excludes lakes, ponds, glaciers > 1 km^{2} (0.386 sq mi or 247 acres) and river estuaries.

Villotte (French pronunciation: [vilɔt]) is a commune in the Vosges department of Grand Est in northeastern France.

== See also ==
- Communes of the Vosges department
