= Canton of Darney =

Coordinates: 48°07′45″N 6°04′52″E

Darney
- Canton
- Country: France
- Region: Grand Est
- Department: Vosges
- No. of communes: {{{nbcomm}}}
- Area: 854.44 km^{2} (329.90 sq mi)
- Population (2023): 17,093
  - Density: 20.005/km^{2} (51.812/sq mi)
- INSEE code: 88 04

The Canton of Darney is a rural French administrative and electoral grouping of communes in the Vosges département of eastern France and in the region of Grand Est. The Canton of Darney has its administrative centre at Darney.

== Composition ==
At the French canton reorganisation which came into effect in March 2015, the canton was expanded from 21 to 82 communes (2 of which were merged into the new commune Tollaincourt):

- Les Ableuvenettes
- Ahéville
- Ainvelle
- Ameuvelle
- Attigny
- Bainville-aux-Saules
- Bazegney
- Begnécourt
- Belmont-lès-Darney
- Belrupt
- Bleurville
- Blevaincourt
- Bocquegney
- Bonvillet
- Bouzemont
- Châtillon-sur-Saône
- Circourt
- Claudon
- Damas-et-Bettegney
- Damblain
- Darney
- Dombasle-devant-Darney
- Dommartin-aux-Bois
- Dommartin-lès-Vallois
- Dompaire
- Escles
- Esley
- Fignévelle
- Fouchécourt
- Frain
- Frénois
- Gelvécourt-et-Adompt
- Gignéville
- Girancourt
- Godoncourt
- Gorhey
- Grignoncourt
- Hagécourt
- Harol
- Hennecourt
- Hennezel
- Isches
- Jésonville
- Lamarche
- Légéville-et-Bonfays
- Lerrain
- Lironcourt
- Madonne-et-Lamerey
- Marey
- Maroncourt
- Martigny-les-Bains
- Martinvelle
- Mont-lès-Lamarche
- Monthureux-sur-Saône
- Morizécourt
- Nonville
- Pierrefitte
- Pont-lès-Bonfays
- Provenchères-lès-Darney
- Racécourt
- Regnévelle
- Relanges
- Robécourt
- Romain-aux-Bois
- Rozières-sur-Mouzon
- Saint-Baslemont
- Saint-Julien
- Sans-Vallois
- Senaide
- Senonges
- Serécourt
- Serocourt
- Les Thons
- Tignécourt
- Tollaincourt
- Les Vallois
- Vaubexy
- Velotte-et-Tatignécourt
- Ville-sur-Illon
- Villotte
- Viviers-le-Gras
