= Serécourt =

- Commune
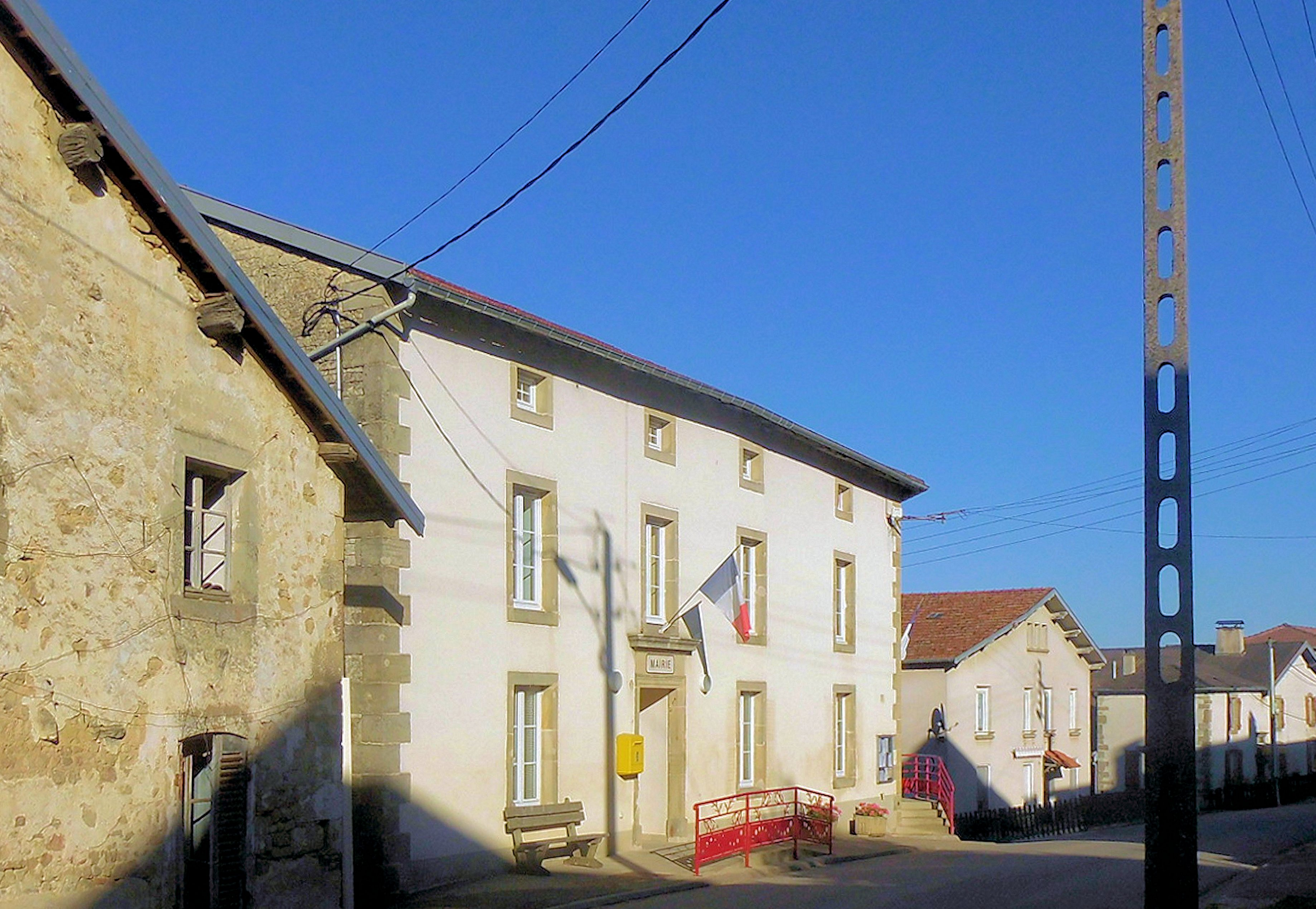
- The town hall in Serécourt

- Coat of arms
- Location of Serécourt
- Location within France Location within Grand Est
- Coordinates: 48°03′19″N 5°50′39″E
- Country: France
- Region: Grand Est
- Department: Vosges
- Arrondissement: Neufchâteau
- Canton: Darney
- Intercommunality: CC Vosges côté Sud-Ouest

Government
  - Mayor (2020–2026): Jean-Claude Tridon
- Area^{1}: 13.7 km^{2} (5.3 sq mi)
- Elevation: 370 m (1,210 ft)
- Highest elevation: 478 m (1,568 ft)
- Lowest elevation: 280 m (920 ft)
- Population (2023): 100
  - Density: 7.3/km^{2} (19/sq mi)
- Time zone: UTC+01:00 (CET)
  - Summer (DST): UTC+02:00 (CEST)
- INSEE/Postal code: 88455 /88320
- ^{1} French Land Register data, which excludes lakes, ponds, glaciers > 1 km^{2} (0.386 sq mi or 247 acres) and river estuaries.

Serécourt (French pronunciation: [səʁekuʁ]) is a commune in the Vosges department in Grand Est in northeastern France.

== See also ==
- Communes of the Vosges department
