= Fouchécourt, Vosges =

Fouchécourt
- Commune
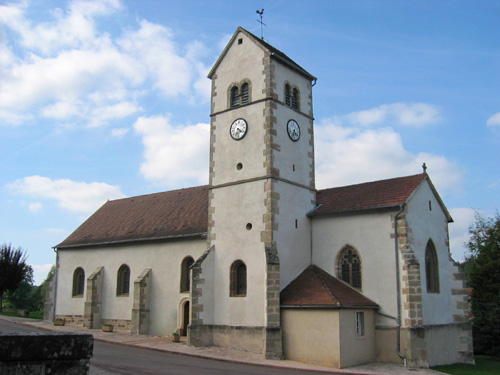
- The church in Fouchécourt
- Location of Fouchécourt
- Location within France Location within Grand Est
- Coordinates: 48°00′35″N 5°51′38″E
- Country: France
- Region: Grand Est
- Department: Vosges
- Arrondissement: Neufchâteau
- Canton: Darney
- Intercommunality: CC Vosges côté Sud-Ouest

Government
  - Mayor (2021–2026): Hervé Soret
- Area^{1}: 4.66 km^{2} (1.80 sq mi)
- Highest elevation: 336 m (1,102 ft)
- Lowest elevation: 238 m (781 ft)
- Population (2023): 40
  - Density: 8.6/km^{2} (22/sq mi)
- Time zone: UTC+01:00 (CET)
  - Summer (DST): UTC+02:00 (CEST)
- INSEE/Postal code: 88179 /88320
- ^{1} French Land Register data, which excludes lakes, ponds, glaciers > 1 km^{2} (0.386 sq mi or 247 acres) and river estuaries.

Fouchécourt (French pronunciation: [fuʃekuʁ]) is a commune in the Vosges department in Grand Est in northeastern France.

== See also ==
- Communes of the Vosges department
