= Mont-lès-Lamarche =

- Commune
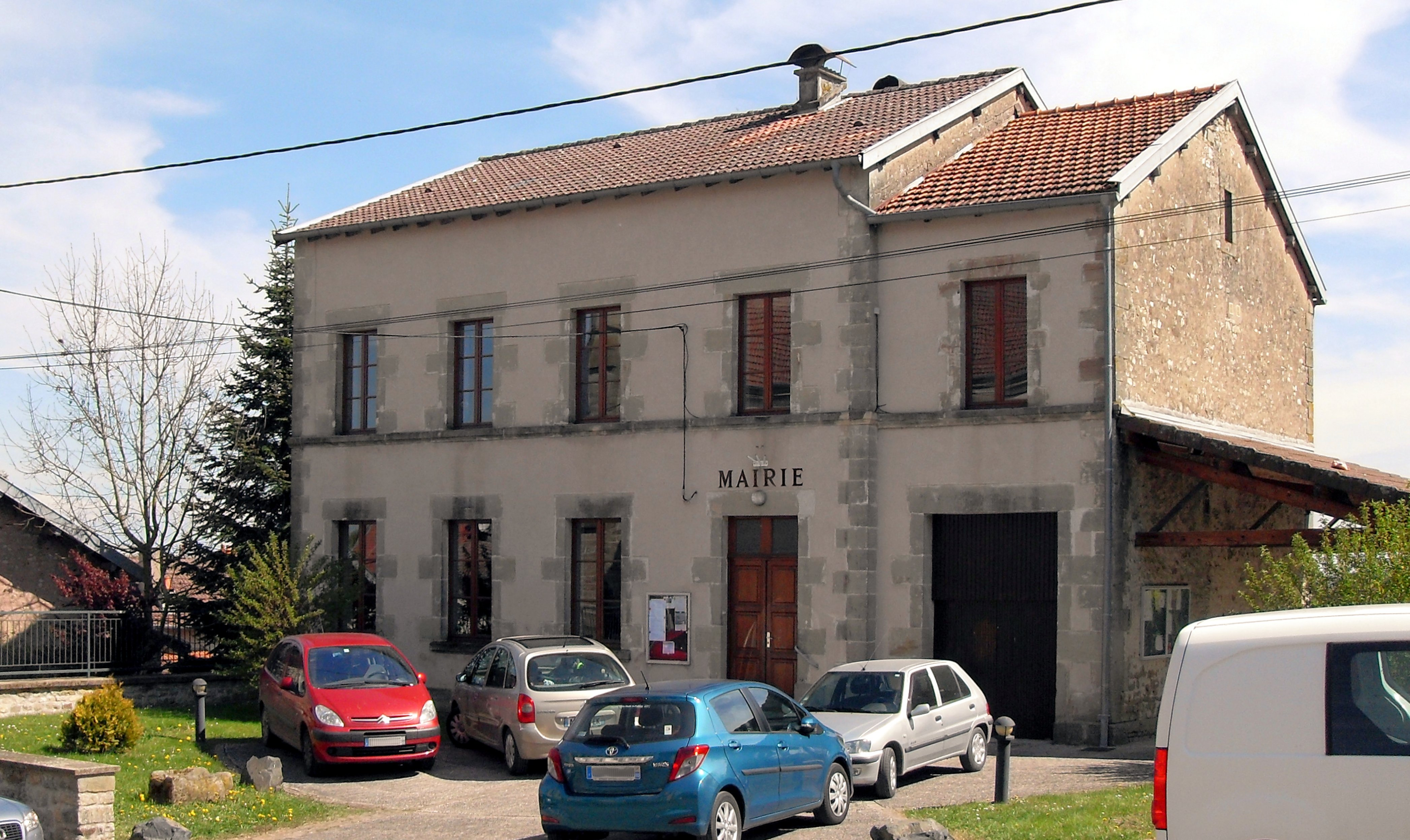
- The town hall in Mont-lès-Lamarche

- Coat of arms
- Location of Mont-lès-Lamarche
- Location within France Location within Grand Est
- Coordinates: 48°01′19″N 5°48′30″E
- Country: France
- Region: Grand Est
- Department: Vosges
- Arrondissement: Neufchâteau
- Canton: Darney
- Intercommunality: CC Vosges côté Sud-Ouest

Government
  - Mayor (2020–2026): Jean-Paul Petit
- Area^{1}: 7.10 km^{2} (2.74 sq mi)
- Elevation: 357 m (1,171 ft)
- Highest elevation: 487 m (1,598 ft)
- Lowest elevation: 312 m (1,024 ft)
- Population (2023): 91
  - Density: 13/km^{2} (33/sq mi)
- Time zone: UTC+01:00 (CET)
  - Summer (DST): UTC+02:00 (CEST)
- INSEE/Postal code: 88307 /88320
- ^{1} French Land Register data, which excludes lakes, ponds, glaciers > 1 km^{2} (0.386 sq mi or 247 acres) and river estuaries.

Mont-lès-Lamarche (French pronunciation: [mɔ̃ lɛ lamaʁʃ], literally Mont near Lamarche) is a commune in the Vosges department in Grand Est in northeastern France.

== Geography ==
Mont-lès-Lamarche is positioned 6 kilometres (4 mi) to the south of Lamarche and 10 kilometres (6 mi) to the north of Bourbonne-les-Bains. Monthureux-sur-Saône is 15 kilometres (9 mi) to the east and Jussey is 26 kilometres (16 miles) to the south-south-east. The commune is on the departmental frontier with Haute-Marne, but there is no direct route across thanks to the intervening topography, the highest point of which is the 487 meter high Malaumont. The commune's 182 hectares of forest are, like the hills, concentrated to the west of the little village: these include the Bois Brûlé (literally burnt wood/forest), Bois de la Plaine and the Bois Chava. The appropriately named Bois des Moines (literally monks' wood/forest) was formerly controlled by the Abbots of Morimond.

At the time of the French Revolution the recorded population stood at 357, and it increased to a peak of 465 in 1866. Subsequently, the picture is one of decline: registered population had fallen to just 93 by the end of the twentieth century.

At the start of the twentieth century, much of the land surrounding the village was still devoted to viticulture, but the vineyards have subsequently disappeared.

== See also ==
- Communes of the Vosges department
