= Senaide =

- Commune
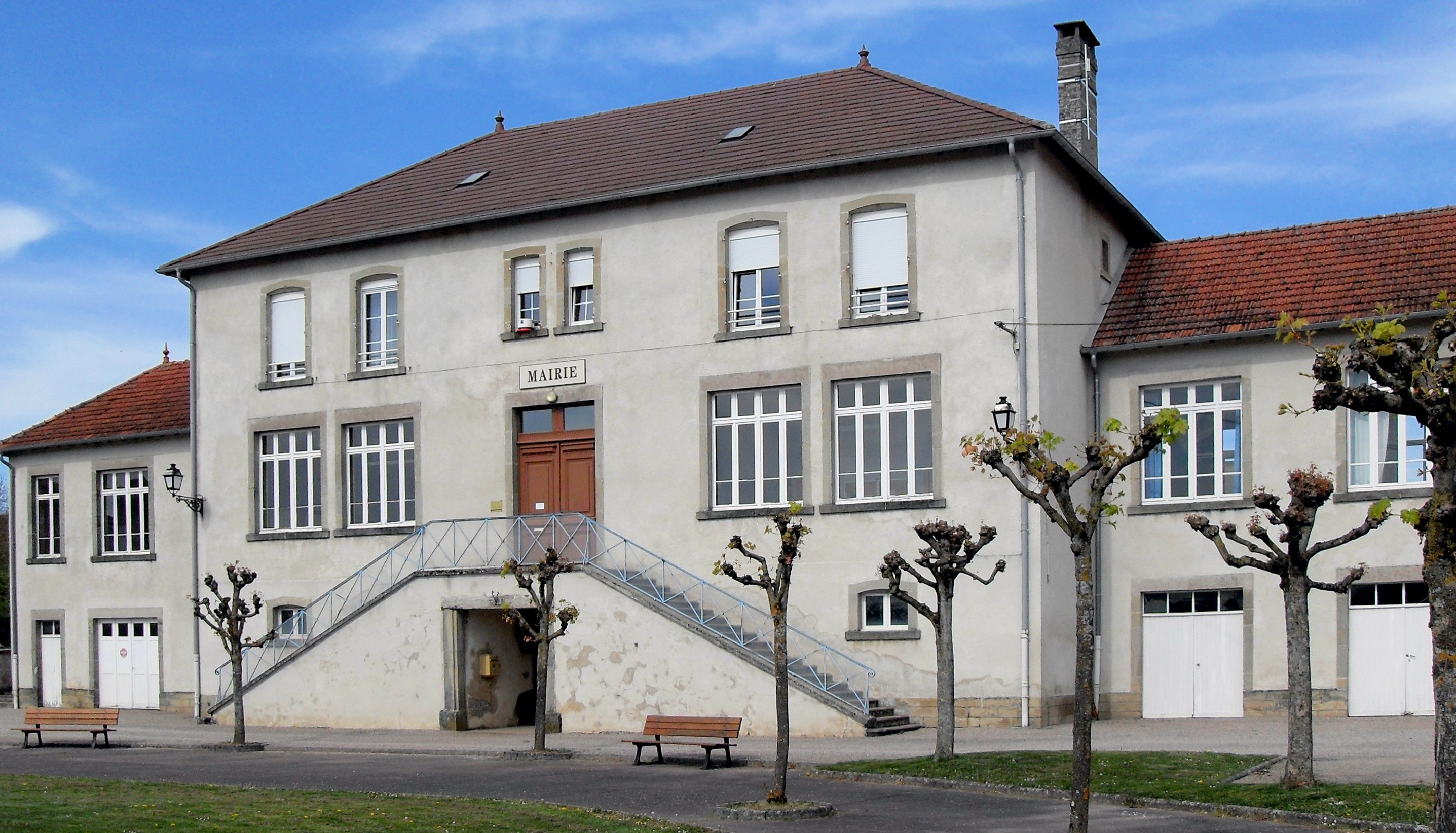
- The town hall in Senaide
- Location of Senaide
- Location within France Location within Grand Est
- Coordinates: 47°58′17″N 5°48′14″E
- Country: France
- Region: Grand Est
- Department: Vosges
- Arrondissement: Neufchâteau
- Canton: Darney
- Intercommunality: CC Vosges côté Sud-Ouest

Government
  - Mayor (2020–2026): Georges Kaarsberg
- Area^{1}: 12.17 km^{2} (4.70 sq mi)
- Elevation: 300 m (980 ft)
- Highest elevation: 435 m (1,427 ft)
- Lowest elevation: 253 m (830 ft)
- Population (2023): 185
  - Density: 15.2/km^{2} (39.4/sq mi)
- Time zone: UTC+01:00 (CET)
  - Summer (DST): UTC+02:00 (CEST)
- INSEE/Postal code: 88450 /88320
- ^{1} French Land Register data, which excludes lakes, ponds, glaciers > 1 km^{2} (0.386 sq mi or 247 acres) and river estuaries.

Senaide (French pronunciation: [sənɛd]) is a commune in the Vosges department in Grand Est in northeastern France.

== See also ==
- Communes of the Vosges department
