= Frain, Vosges =

Frain
- Commune
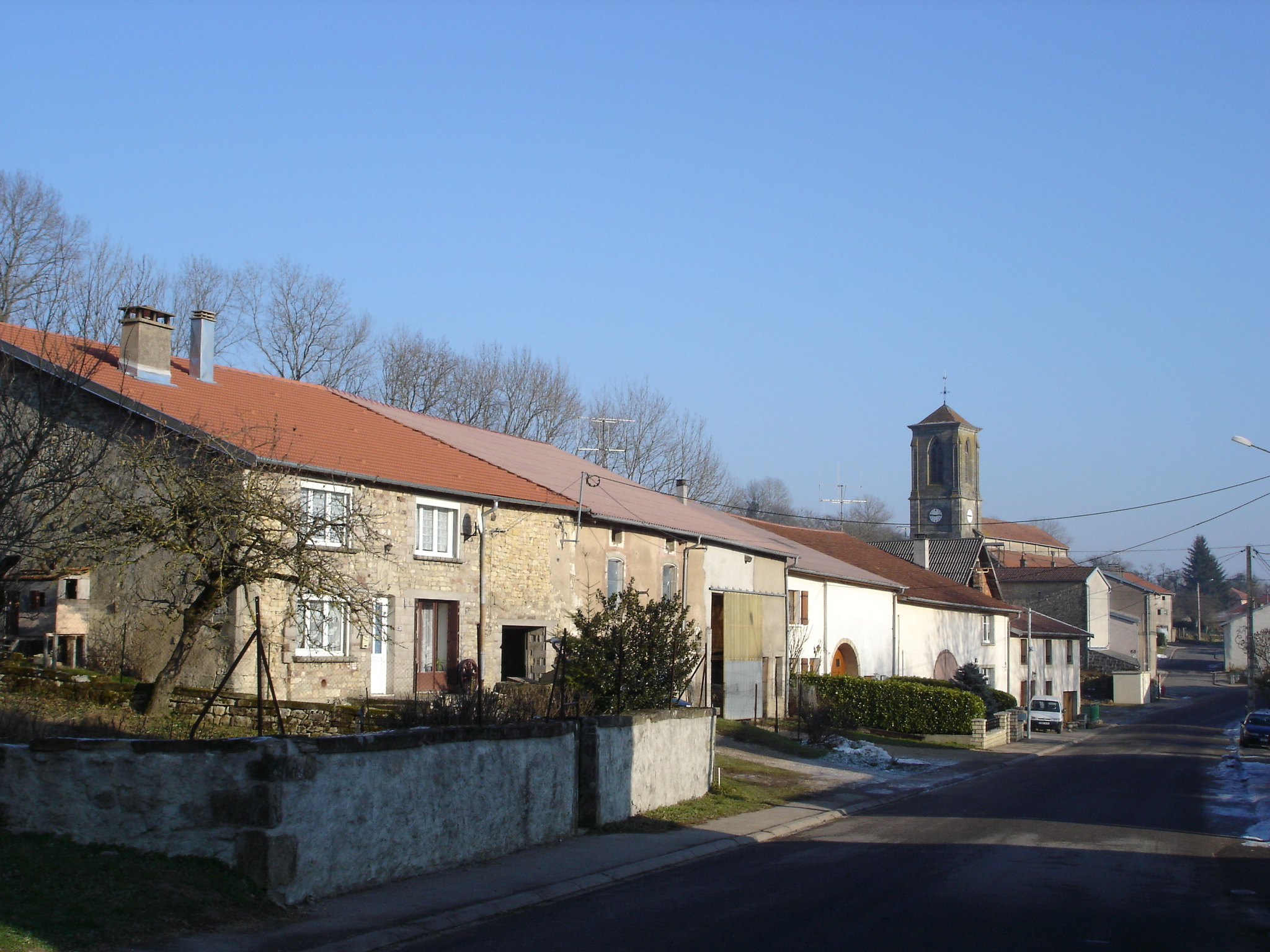
- The village of Frain

- Coat of arms
- Location of Frain
- Location within France Location within Grand Est
- Coordinates: 48°05′12″N 5°52′52″E
- Country: France
- Region: Grand Est
- Department: Vosges
- Arrondissement: Neufchâteau
- Canton: Darney
- Intercommunality: CC Vosges côté Sud-Ouest

Government
  - Mayor (2020–2026): Claude Nicolas
- Area^{1}: 7.54 km^{2} (2.91 sq mi)
- Elevation: 357 m (1,171 ft)
- Highest elevation: 421 m (1,381 ft)
- Lowest elevation: 289 m (948 ft)
- Population (2023): 125
  - Density: 16.6/km^{2} (42.9/sq mi)
- Time zone: UTC+01:00 (CET)
  - Summer (DST): UTC+02:00 (CEST)
- INSEE/Postal code: 88180 /88320
- ^{1} French Land Register data, which excludes lakes, ponds, glaciers > 1 km^{2} (0.386 sq mi or 247 acres) and river estuaries.

Frain (French pronunciation: [fʁɛ̃]) is a commune in the Vosges department in Grand Est in northeastern France.

== See also ==
- Communes of the Vosges department
