= Morizécourt =

- Commune
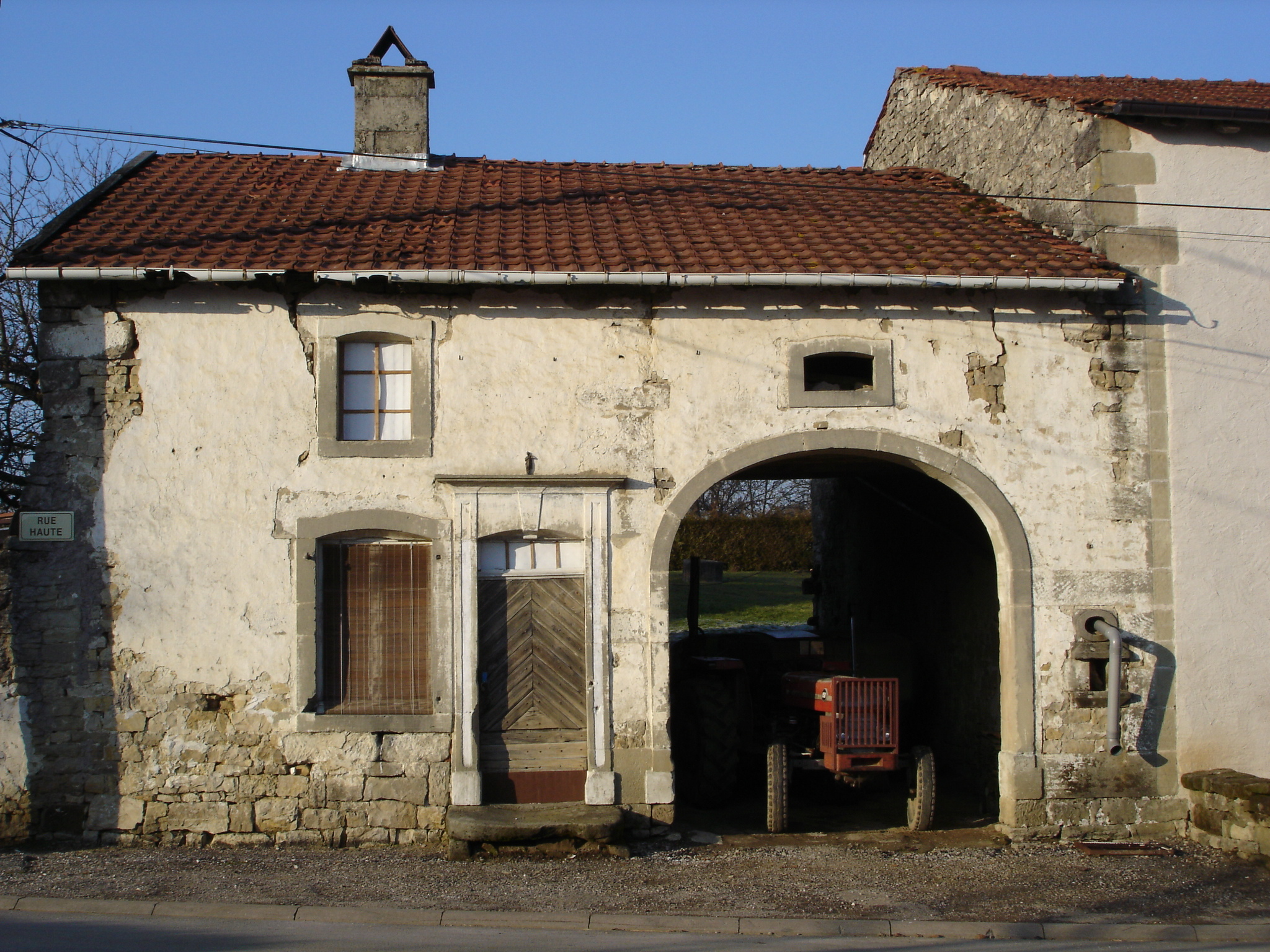
- A house in Morizécourt

- Coat of arms
- Location of Morizécourt
- Location within France Location within Grand Est
- Coordinates: 48°04′16″N 5°51′40″E
- Country: France
- Region: Grand Est
- Department: Vosges
- Arrondissement: Neufchâteau
- Canton: Darney
- Intercommunality: CC Vosges côté Sud-Ouest

Government
  - Mayor (2020–2026): Alexandre Destrignéville
- Area^{1}: 10.68 km^{2} (4.12 sq mi)
- Elevation: 350 m (1,150 ft)
- Highest elevation: 422 m (1,385 ft)
- Lowest elevation: 279 m (915 ft)
- Population (2023): 98
  - Density: 9.2/km^{2} (24/sq mi)
- Time zone: UTC+01:00 (CET)
  - Summer (DST): UTC+02:00 (CEST)
- INSEE/Postal code: 88314 /88320
- ^{1} French Land Register data, which excludes lakes, ponds, glaciers > 1 km^{2} (0.386 sq mi or 247 acres) and river estuaries.

Morizécourt (French pronunciation: [mɔʁizekuʁ]) is a commune in the Vosges department in Grand Est in northeastern France.

The Benedictine priory at Morizécourt dates from 1624.

== See also ==
- Communes of the Vosges department
