= Marey, Vosges =

Marey
- Commune
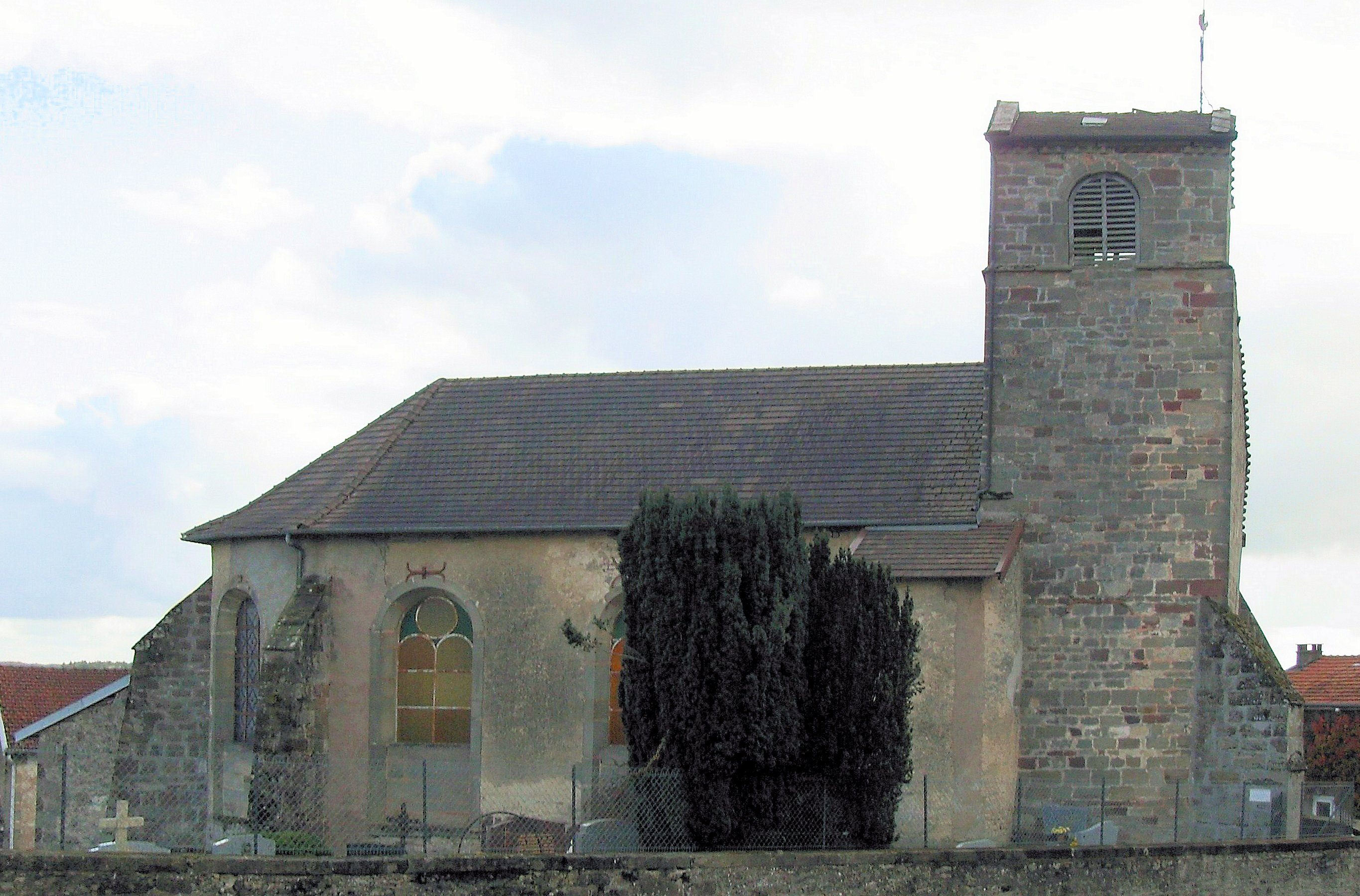
- The church in Marey
- Location of Marey
- Location within France Location within Grand Est
- Coordinates: 48°06′07″N 5°54′06″E
- Country: France
- Region: Grand Est
- Department: Vosges
- Arrondissement: Neufchâteau
- Canton: Darney
- Intercommunality: CC Vosges côté Sud-Ouest

Government
  - Mayor (2020–2026): Yves Gatto
- Area^{1}: 7.90 km^{2} (3.05 sq mi)
- Elevation: 375 m (1,230 ft)
- Highest elevation: 432 m (1,417 ft)
- Lowest elevation: 285 m (935 ft)
- Population (2023): 72
  - Density: 9.1/km^{2} (24/sq mi)
- Time zone: UTC+01:00 (CET)
  - Summer (DST): UTC+02:00 (CEST)
- INSEE/Postal code: 88287 /88320
- ^{1} French Land Register data, which excludes lakes, ponds, glaciers > 1 km^{2} (0.386 sq mi or 247 acres) and river estuaries.

Marey (French pronunciation: [maʁɛ]) is a commune in the Vosges department in Grand Est in northeastern France.

== See also ==
- Communes of the Vosges department
