= Tollaincourt =

- Commune
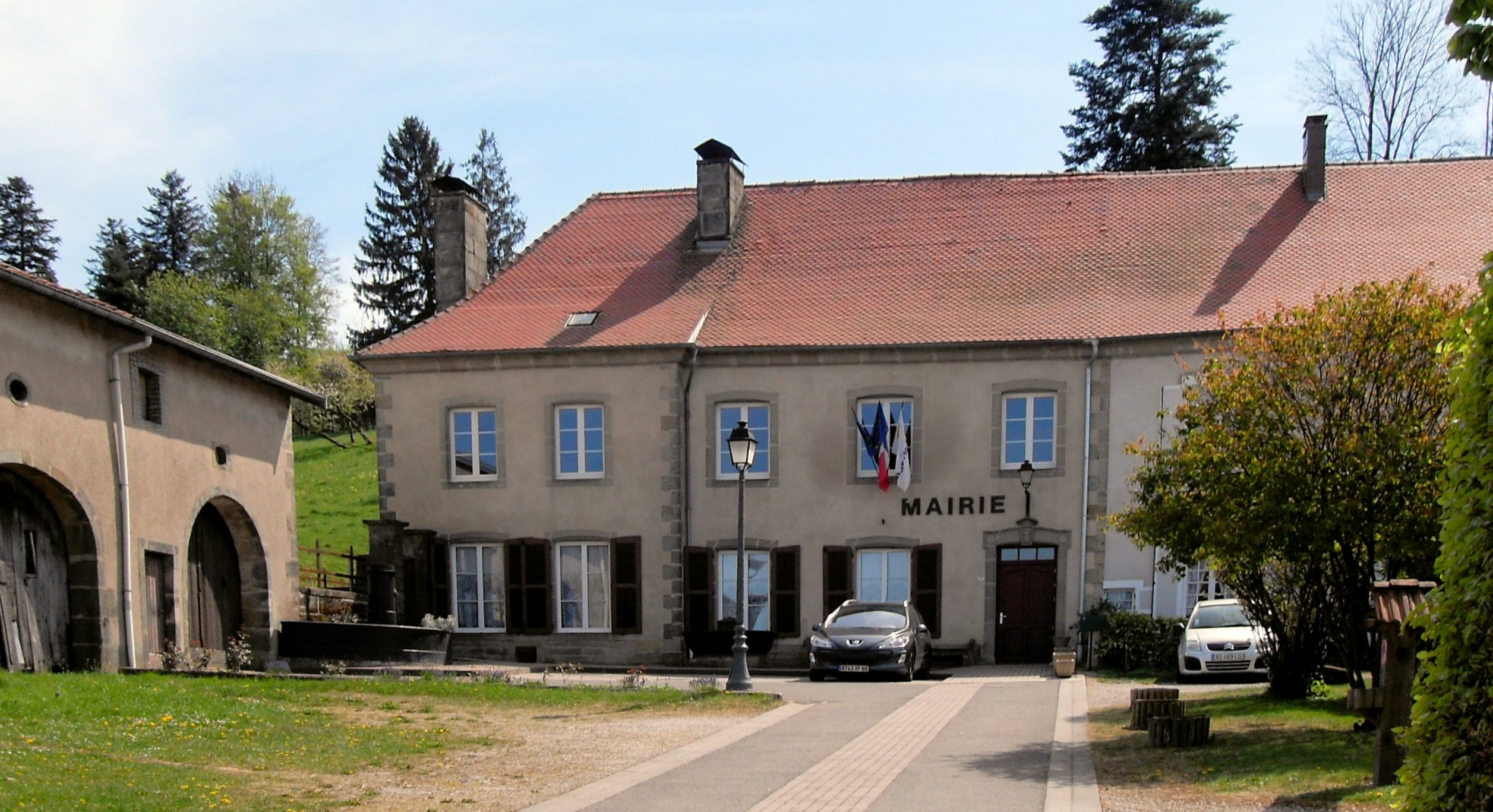
- The town hall in Tollaincourt

- Coat of arms
- Location of Tollaincourt
- Location within France Location within Grand Est
- Coordinates: 48°05′51″N 5°44′09″E
- Country: France
- Region: Grand Est
- Department: Vosges
- Arrondissement: Neufchâteau
- Canton: Darney
- Intercommunality: CC Vosges côté Sud-Ouest

Government
  - Mayor (2020–2026): Isabelle Calteau
- Area^{1}: 14.13 km^{2} (5.46 sq mi)
- Elevation: 380 m (1,250 ft)
- Highest elevation: 458 m (1,503 ft)
- Lowest elevation: 333 m (1,093 ft)
- Population (2023): 116
  - Density: 8.21/km^{2} (21.3/sq mi)
- Time zone: UTC+01:00 (CET)
  - Summer (DST): UTC+02:00 (CEST)
- INSEE/Postal code: 88475 /88320
- ^{1} French Land Register data, which excludes lakes, ponds, glaciers > 1 km^{2} (0.386 sq mi or 247 acres) and river estuaries.

Tollaincourt (French pronunciation: [tɔlɛ̃kuʁ]) is a commune in the Vosges department in Grand Est in northeastern France. On 1 January 2017, the former commune of Rocourt was merged into Tollaincourt.

== See also ==
- Communes of the Vosges department
