= Les Thons =

- Commune
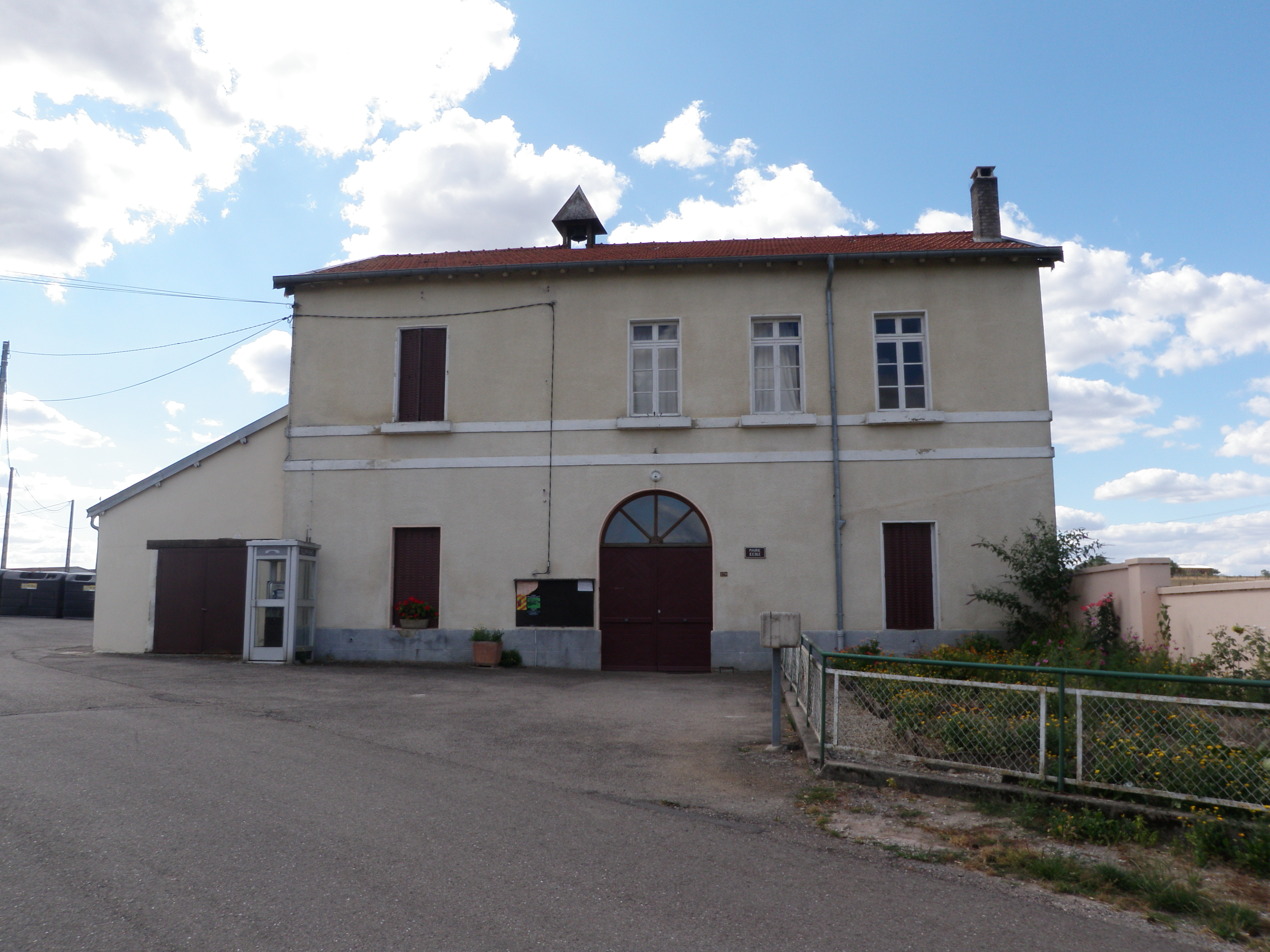
- The town hall in Les Thons

- Coat of arms
- Location of Les Thons
- Location within France Location within Grand Est
- Coordinates: 47°59′25″N 5°53′11″E
- Country: France
- Region: Grand Est
- Department: Vosges
- Arrondissement: Neufchâteau
- Canton: Darney
- Intercommunality: CC Vosges côté Sud-Ouest

Government
  - Mayor (2021–2026): Jean Claude Sylvestre
- Area^{1}: 10.09 km^{2} (3.90 sq mi)
- Elevation: 272 m (892 ft)
- Highest elevation: 402 m (1,319 ft)
- Lowest elevation: 234 m (768 ft)
- Population (2023): 97
  - Density: 9.6/km^{2} (25/sq mi)
- Time zone: UTC+01:00 (CET)
  - Summer (DST): UTC+02:00 (CEST)
- INSEE/Postal code: 88471 /88410
- ^{1} French Land Register data, which excludes lakes, ponds, glaciers > 1 km^{2} (0.386 sq mi or 247 acres) and river estuaries.

Les Thons (French pronunciation: [le tɔ̃]) is a commune in the Vosges department in Grand Est in northeastern France.

== See also ==
- Communes of the Vosges department
