= Romain-aux-Bois =

- Commune
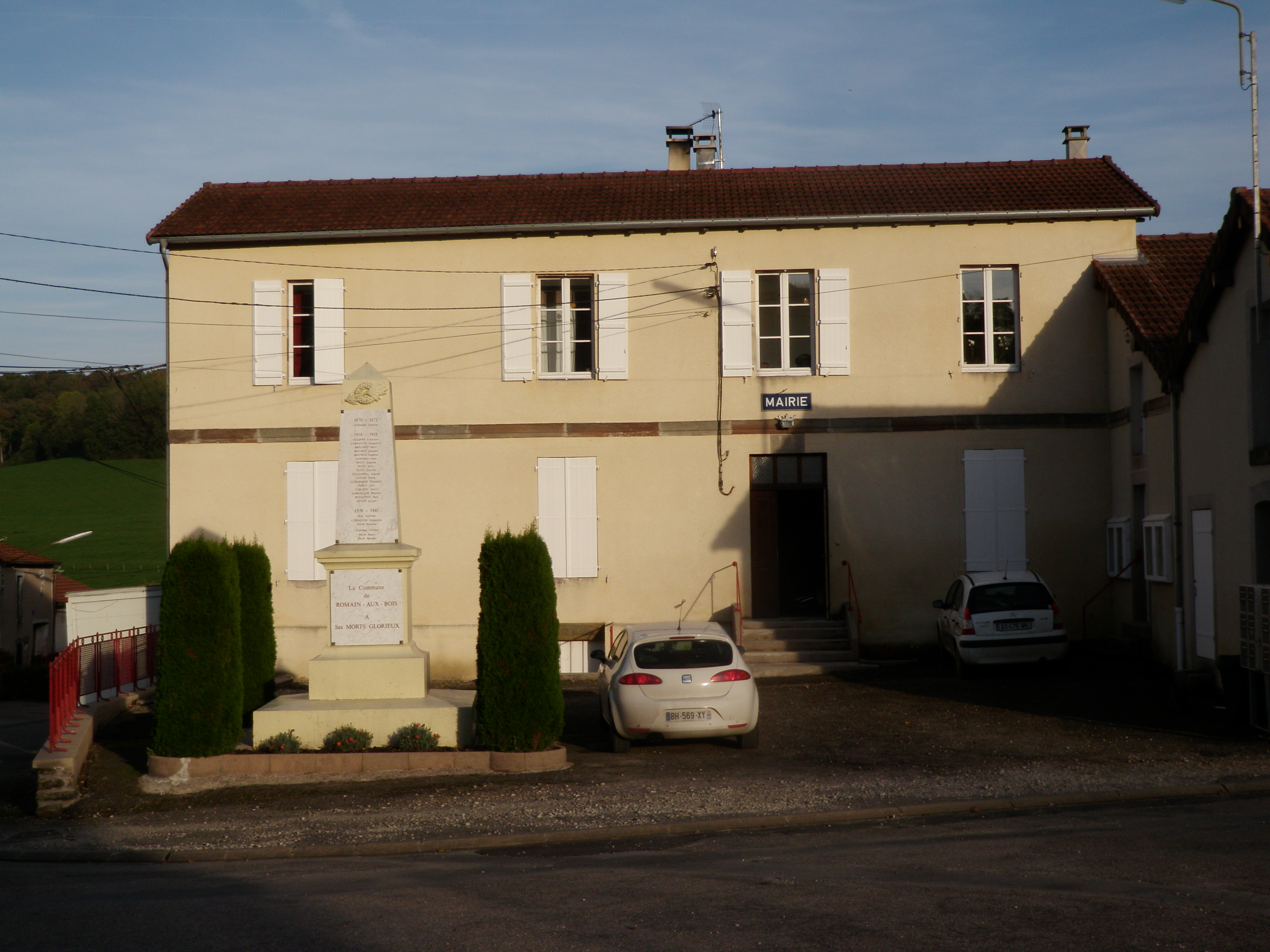
- The town hall in Romain-aux-Bois
- Location of Romain-aux-Bois
- Location within France Location within Grand Est
- Coordinates: 48°04′58″N 5°43′10″E
- Country: France
- Region: Grand Est
- Department: Vosges
- Arrondissement: Neufchâteau
- Canton: Darney
- Intercommunality: CC Vosges côté Sud-Ouest

Government
  - Mayor (2020–2026): Pascal Fatet
- Area^{1}: 8.14 km^{2} (3.14 sq mi)
- Elevation: 350 m (1,150 ft)
- Highest elevation: 460 m (1,510 ft)
- Lowest elevation: 337 m (1,106 ft)
- Population (2023): 47
  - Density: 5.8/km^{2} (15/sq mi)
- Time zone: UTC+01:00 (CET)
  - Summer (DST): UTC+02:00 (CEST)
- INSEE/Postal code: 88394 /88320
- ^{1} French Land Register data, which excludes lakes, ponds, glaciers > 1 km^{2} (0.386 sq mi or 247 acres) and river estuaries.

Romain-aux-Bois (French pronunciation: [ʁɔmɛ̃ o bwa]) is a commune in the Vosges department in Grand Est in northeastern France.

== See also ==
- Communes of the Vosges department
