= Rocourt, Vosges =

Rocourt
- Part of Tollaincourt
- Location of Rocourt
- Location within France Location within Grand Est
- Coordinates: 48°06′18″N 5°44′24″E
- Country: France
- Region: Grand Est
- Department: Vosges
- Arrondissement: Neufchâteau
- Canton: Darney
- Commune: Tollaincourt
- Area^{1}: 1.86 km^{2} (0.72 sq mi)
- Highest elevation: 433 m (1,421 ft)
- Lowest elevation: 336 m (1,102 ft)
- Population (2014): 27
  - Density: 15/km^{2} (38/sq mi)
- Time zone: UTC+01:00 (CET)
  - Summer (DST): UTC+02:00 (CEST)
- Postal code: 88320
- ^{1} French Land Register data, which excludes lakes, ponds, glaciers > 1 km^{2} (0.386 sq mi or 247 acres) and river estuaries.

Rocourt (French pronunciation: [ʁɔkuʁ]) is a former commune in the Vosges department in Grand Est in northeastern France. On 1 January 2017, it was merged into the commune Tollaincourt.

== See also ==
- Communes of the Vosges department
