= Ainvelle, Vosges =

Ainvelle
- Commune
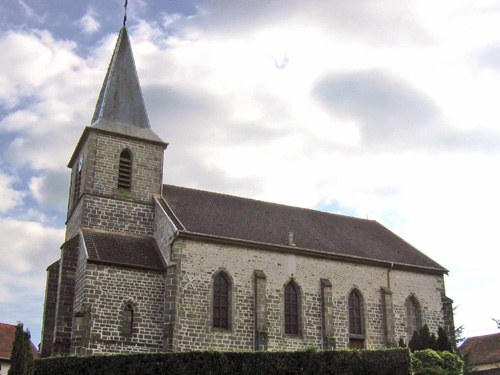
- The church in Ainvelle
- Location of Ainvelle
- Location within France Location within Grand Est
- Coordinates: 47°59′53″N 5°49′45″E
- Country: France
- Region: Grand Est
- Department: Vosges
- Arrondissement: Neufchâteau
- Canton: Darney
- Intercommunality: Vosges Côté Sud-Ouest

Government
  - Mayor (2020–2026): Thierry Hubrecht
- Area^{1}: 9.03 km^{2} (3.49 sq mi)
- Elevation: 301 m (988 ft)
- Highest elevation: 444 m (1,457 ft)
- Lowest elevation: 259 m (850 ft)
- Population (2023): 140
  - Density: 16/km^{2} (40/sq mi)
- Time zone: UTC+01:00 (CET)
  - Summer (DST): UTC+02:00 (CEST)
- INSEE/Postal code: 88004 /88320
- ^{1} French Land Register data, which excludes lakes, ponds, glaciers > 1 km^{2} (0.386 sq mi or 247 acres) and river estuaries.

Ainvelle (French pronunciation: [ɛ̃vɛl]) is a commune in the Vosges department in Grand Est in northeastern France.

== Population ==
Historical population
Year	Pop.	±% p.a.
1968	179	—
1975	179	+0.00%
1982	168	−0.90%
1990	154	−1.08%
1999	148	−0.44%
2007	161	+1.06%
2012	165	+0.49%
2017	142	−2.96%
2023	140	−0.24%
Source: INSEE

== See also ==
- Communes of the Vosges department
