= Serocourt =

- Commune
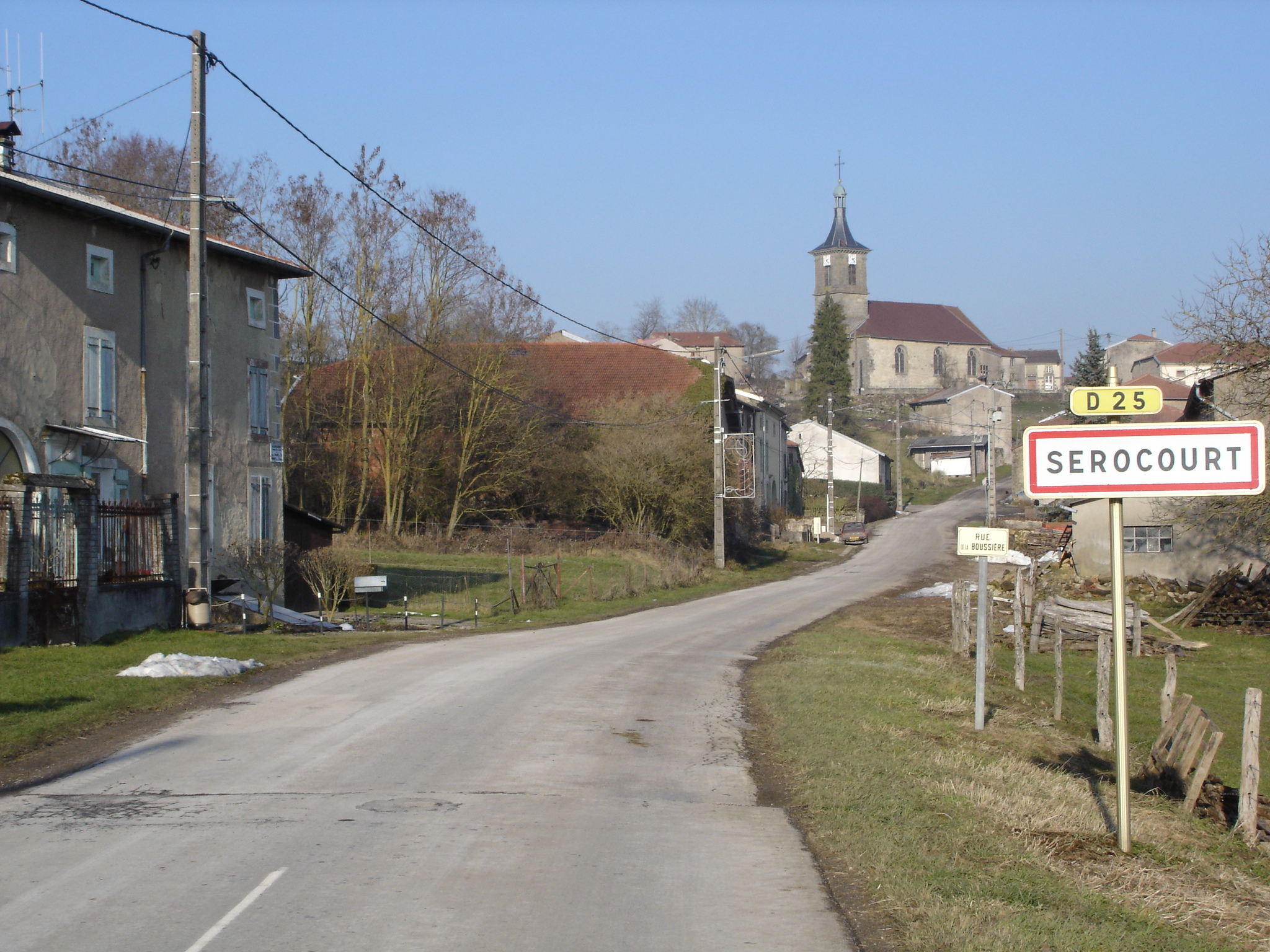
- The road into Serocourt

- Coat of arms
- Location of Serocourt
- Location within France Location within Grand Est
- Coordinates: 48°05′45″N 5°53′42″E
- Country: France
- Region: Grand Est
- Department: Vosges
- Arrondissement: Neufchâteau
- Canton: Darney
- Intercommunality: CC Vosges côté Sud-Ouest

Government
  - Mayor (2020–2026): Alexia Brot
- Area^{1}: 11.05 km^{2} (4.27 sq mi)
- Elevation: 380 m (1,250 ft)
- Highest elevation: 497 m (1,631 ft)
- Lowest elevation: 289 m (948 ft)
- Population (2023): 84
  - Density: 7.6/km^{2} (20/sq mi)
- Time zone: UTC+01:00 (CET)
  - Summer (DST): UTC+02:00 (CEST)
- INSEE/Postal code: 88456 /88320
- ^{1} French Land Register data, which excludes lakes, ponds, glaciers > 1 km^{2} (0.386 sq mi or 247 acres) and river estuaries.

Serocourt (French pronunciation: [səʁɔkuʁ]) is a commune in the Vosges department in Grand Est in northeastern France.

== See also ==
- Communes of the Vosges department
