= Robécourt =

- Commune
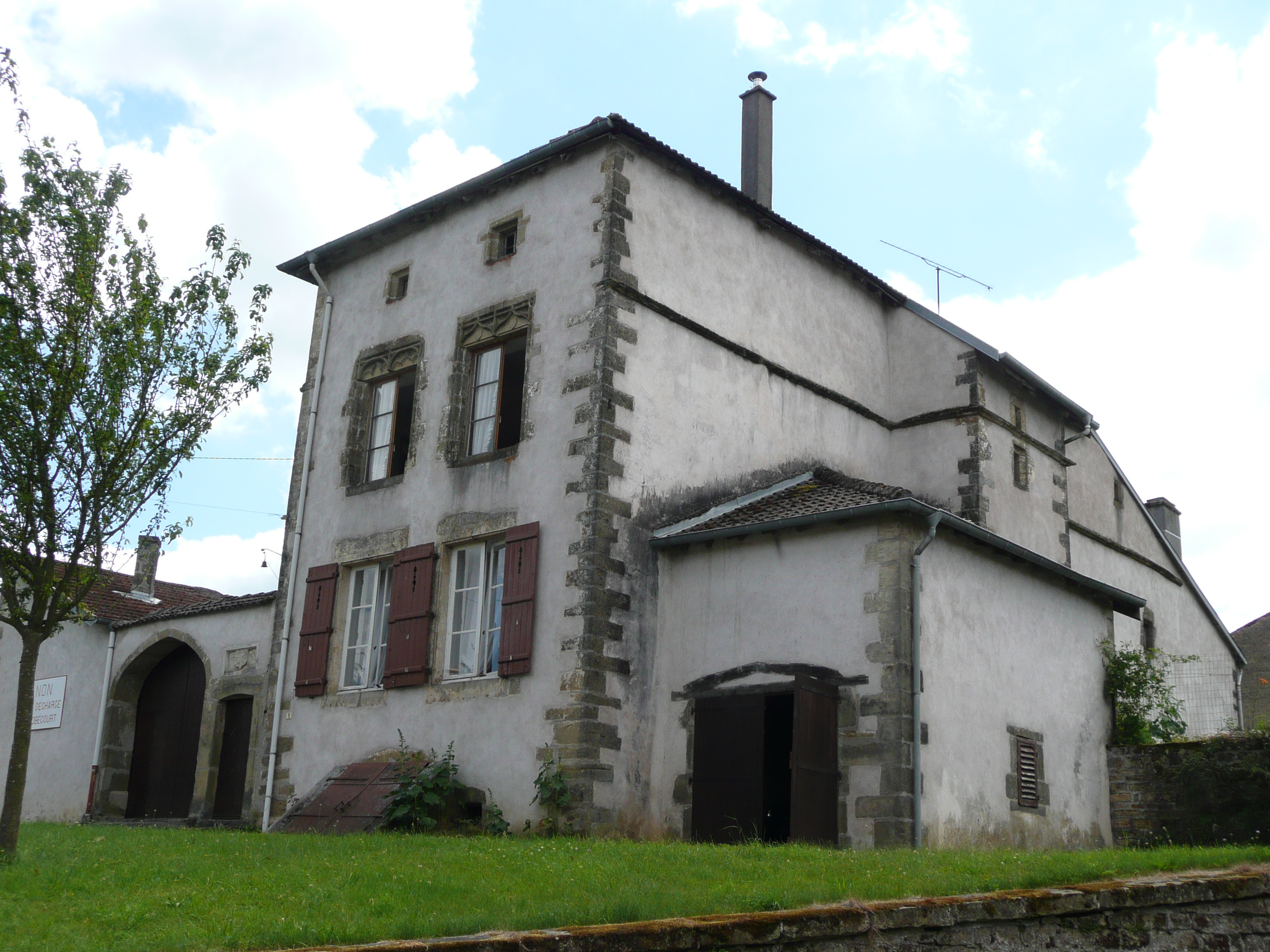
- Commandery of the Knights of St. John of Jerusalem

- Coat of arms
- Location of Robécourt
- Location within France Location within Grand Est
- Coordinates: 48°08′31″N 5°41′54″E
- Country: France
- Region: Grand Est
- Department: Vosges
- Arrondissement: Neufchâteau
- Canton: Darney
- Intercommunality: CC Vosges côté Sud-Ouest

Government
  - Mayor (2020–2026): Régine Thomas
- Area^{1}: 8.78 km^{2} (3.39 sq mi)
- Elevation: 350 m (1,150 ft)
- Highest elevation: 406 m (1,332 ft)
- Lowest elevation: 324 m (1,063 ft)
- Population (2023): 104
  - Density: 11.8/km^{2} (30.7/sq mi)
- Time zone: UTC+01:00 (CET)
  - Summer (DST): UTC+02:00 (CEST)
- INSEE/Postal code: 88390 /88320
- ^{1} French Land Register data, which excludes lakes, ponds, glaciers > 1 km^{2} (0.386 sq mi or 247 acres) and river estuaries.

Robécourt (French pronunciation: [ʁɔbekuʁ]) is a commune in the Vosges department in Grand Est in northeastern France.

== See also ==
- Communes of the Vosges department
