= Lamarche, Vosges =

Lamarche
- Commune
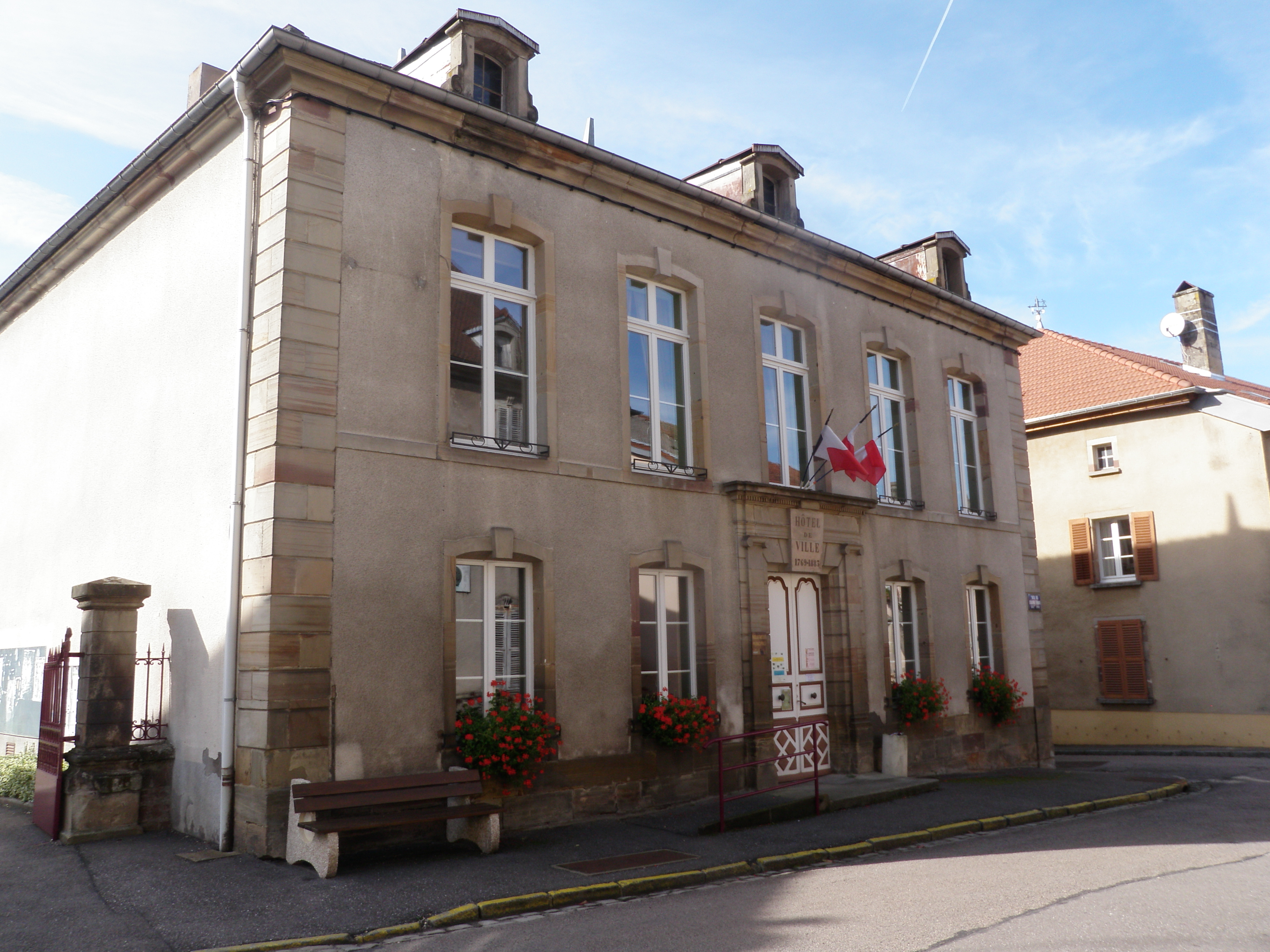
- The town hall in Lamarche

- Coat of arms
- Location of Lamarche
- Location within France Location within Grand Est
- Coordinates: 48°04′09″N 5°46′57″E
- Country: France
- Region: Grand Est
- Department: Vosges
- Arrondissement: Neufchâteau
- Canton: Darney
- Intercommunality: CC Vosges côté Sud-Ouest

Government
  - Mayor (2020–2026): Daniel Vagné
- Area^{1}: 33.69 km^{2} (13.01 sq mi)
- Elevation: 355 m (1,165 ft)
- Highest elevation: 500 m (1,600 ft)
- Lowest elevation: 339 m (1,112 ft)
- Population (2023): 786
  - Density: 23.3/km^{2} (60.4/sq mi)
- Time zone: UTC+01:00 (CET)
  - Summer (DST): UTC+02:00 (CEST)
- INSEE/Postal code: 88258 /88320
- ^{1} French Land Register data, which excludes lakes, ponds, glaciers > 1 km^{2} (0.386 sq mi or 247 acres) and river estuaries.

Lamarche (French pronunciation: [lamaʁʃ]) is a commune in the Vosges department in Grand Est in northeastern France.

== See also ==
- Communes of the Vosges department
