= Canton of Rambervillers =

Coordinates: 48°20′46″N 6°38′7″E

Rambervillers
- Former canton
- Interactive map of Rambervillers
- Country: France
- Region: Grand Est
- Department: Vosges
- No. of communes: {{{nbcomm}}}
- Disbanded: 2015
- Area: 312 km^{2} (120 sq mi)
- Population (2012): 13,123
  - Density: 42.1/km^{2} (109/sq mi)

The Canton of Rambervillers is a former French administrative and electoral grouping of communes in the Vosges département of eastern France and in the region of Lorraine. It was disbanded following the French canton reorganisation which came into effect in March 2015. It had 13,123 inhabitants (2012).

Positioned within the Arrondissement of Épinal, the canton had its administrative centre at Rambervillers.

== Composition ==
The Canton of Rambervillers comprised the following 29 communes:

- Anglemont
- Autrey
- Bazien
- Brû
- Bult
- Clézentaine
- Deinvillers
- Domptail
- Doncières
- Fauconcourt
- Hardancourt
- Housseras
- Jeanménil
- Ménarmont
- Ménil-sur-Belvitte
- Moyemont
- Nossoncourt
- Ortoncourt
- Rambervillers
- Romont
- Roville-aux-Chênes
- Saint-Benoît-la-Chipotte
- Sainte-Barbe
- Saint-Genest
- Saint-Gorgon
- Saint-Maurice-sur-Mortagne
- Saint-Pierremont
- Vomécourt
- Xaffévillers
