= Nossoncourt =

- Commune
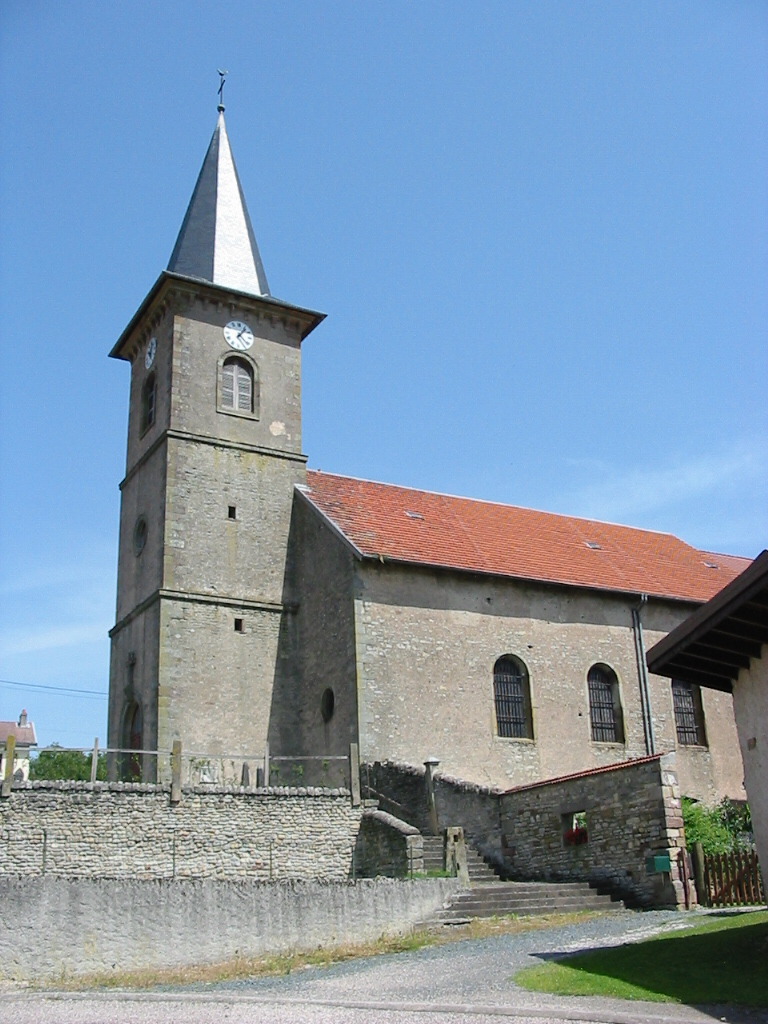
- The church in Nossoncourt
- Location of Nossoncourt
- Location within France Location within Grand Est
- Coordinates: 48°24′00″N 6°40′23″E
- Country: France
- Region: Grand Est
- Department: Vosges
- Arrondissement: Épinal
- Canton: Raon-l'Étape
- Intercommunality: CC Région de Rambervillers

Government
  - Mayor (2020–2026): Pierre Bailly
- Area^{1}: 5.34 km^{2} (2.06 sq mi)
- Elevation: 270 m (890 ft)
- Highest elevation: 371 m (1,217 ft)
- Lowest elevation: 267 m (876 ft)
- Population (2023): 122
  - Density: 22.8/km^{2} (59.2/sq mi)
- Time zone: UTC+01:00 (CET)
  - Summer (DST): UTC+02:00 (CEST)
- INSEE/Postal code: 88333 /88700
- ^{1} French Land Register data, which excludes lakes, ponds, glaciers > 1 km^{2} (0.386 sq mi or 247 acres) and river estuaries.

Nossoncourt (French pronunciation: [nɔsɔ̃kuʁ]) is a commune in the Vosges department in Grand Est in northeastern France.

== History ==
Nossoncourt was a lordship and the local capital or a territory which also included the modern communes of Anglemont, Bazien, Sainte-Barbe, Ménil-sur-Belvitte, Ménarmont et Xaffévillers.

According to a title document dated 1345 it was one of the earliest fiefs belonging to the Bishopric of Metz.

The Thirty Years War brought destruction to many villages in the contested territories between France and The Empire. Nossoncourt was destroyed by a Swedish army in 1635, the Swedes being at that point allies of the French and enemies of the Dukes of Lorraine.

During the twentieth century wars the village was again the scene of violent fighting notably in 1914 and in the Autumn/Fall of 1944.

== See also ==
- Communes of the Vosges department
