= Romont (disambiguation) =

Romont may refer to:

- Romont, Vosges, France
- Romont, Fribourg, Switzerland
  - Romont Castle
- Romont, Berne, Switzerland
- Romont, West Virginia, United States
- Romont is a named for the Dutch city Roermond
