= Ortoncourt =

- Commune
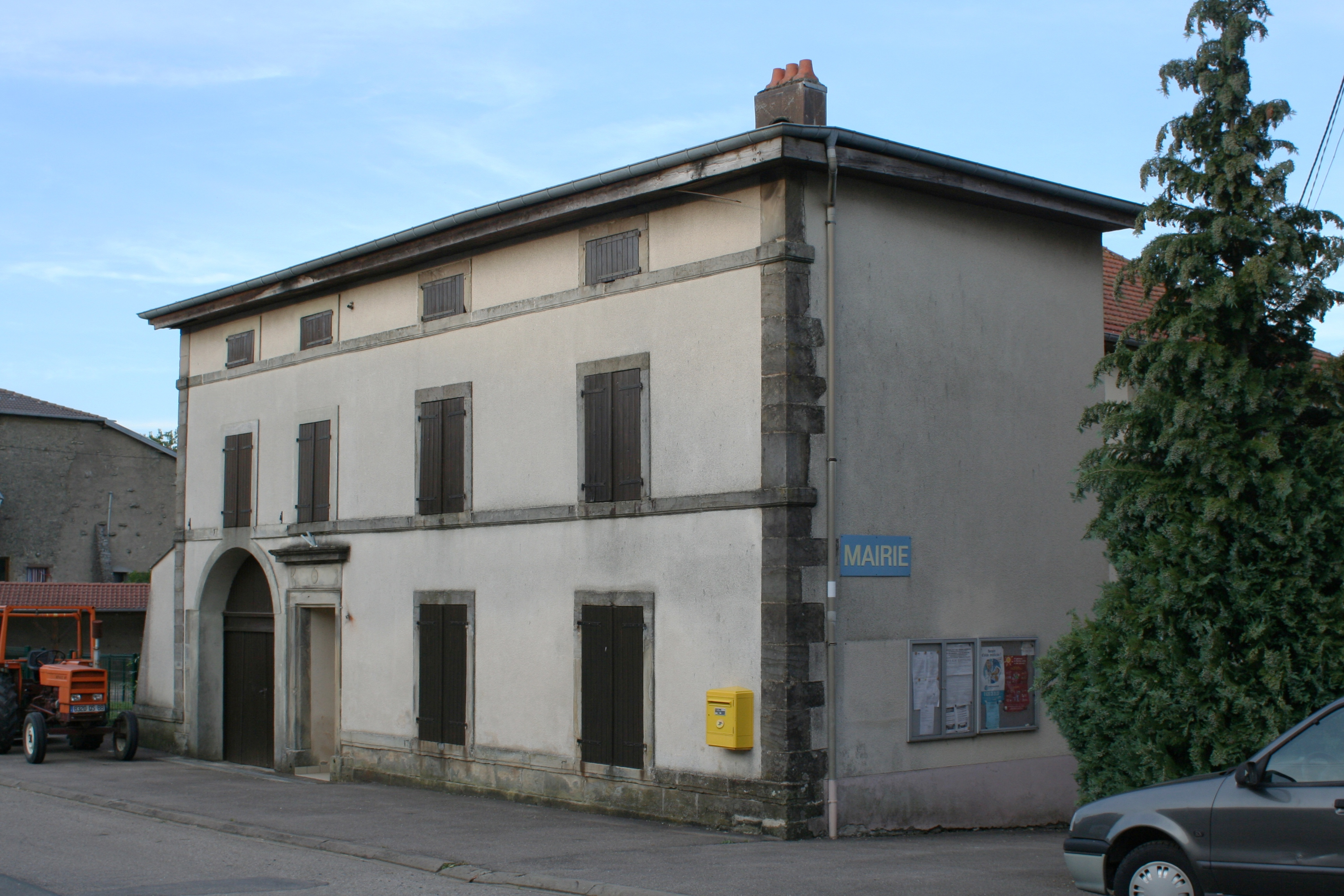
- The town hall in Ortoncourt
- Location of Ortoncourt
- Location within France Location within Grand Est
- Coordinates: 48°22′02″N 6°30′46″E
- Country: France
- Region: Grand Est
- Department: Vosges
- Arrondissement: Épinal
- Canton: Charmes
- Intercommunality: CC Région de Rambervillers

Government
  - Mayor (2020–2026): Yannick Colin
- Area^{1}: 4.39 km^{2} (1.69 sq mi)
- Elevation: 320 m (1,050 ft)
- Highest elevation: 391 m (1,283 ft)
- Lowest elevation: 297 m (974 ft)
- Population (2023): 94
  - Density: 21/km^{2} (55/sq mi)
- Time zone: UTC+01:00 (CET)
  - Summer (DST): UTC+02:00 (CEST)
- INSEE/Postal code: 88338 /88700
- ^{1} French Land Register data, which excludes lakes, ponds, glaciers > 1 km^{2} (0.386 sq mi or 247 acres) and river estuaries.

Ortoncourt (French pronunciation: [ɔʁtɔ̃kuʁ]) is a commune in the Vosges department in Grand Est in northeastern France.

== History ==
There is a record of a latinate version of the name, Ortonis curte, recorded in the eleventh century when the village was part of the bailiwick of Châtel-sur-Moselle. In terms of ecclesiastical administration its church, dedicated to Saint Urban, came under the parish of Moyemont.

Under the secular arrangements established in the wake of the French Revolution, Ortoncourt in 1790 became part of the canton of Fauconcourt in the district of Rambervillers until 1800 when the modern administrative structure was introduced.

== See also ==
- Communes of the Vosges department
