= Lucien Nicolas =

French politician

Personal details
- Born: 28 April 1909
- Died: 29 August 1966 (aged 57)

Lucien Nicolas (28 April 1909 – 29 August 1966) was a French politician.

Nicolas was born in Rambervillers. He represented the Popular Republican Movement (MRP) in the National Assembly from 1956 to 1958.
