= Arrondissement of Épinal =

Coordinates: 48°10′N 6°27′E

Épinal
- Arrondissement
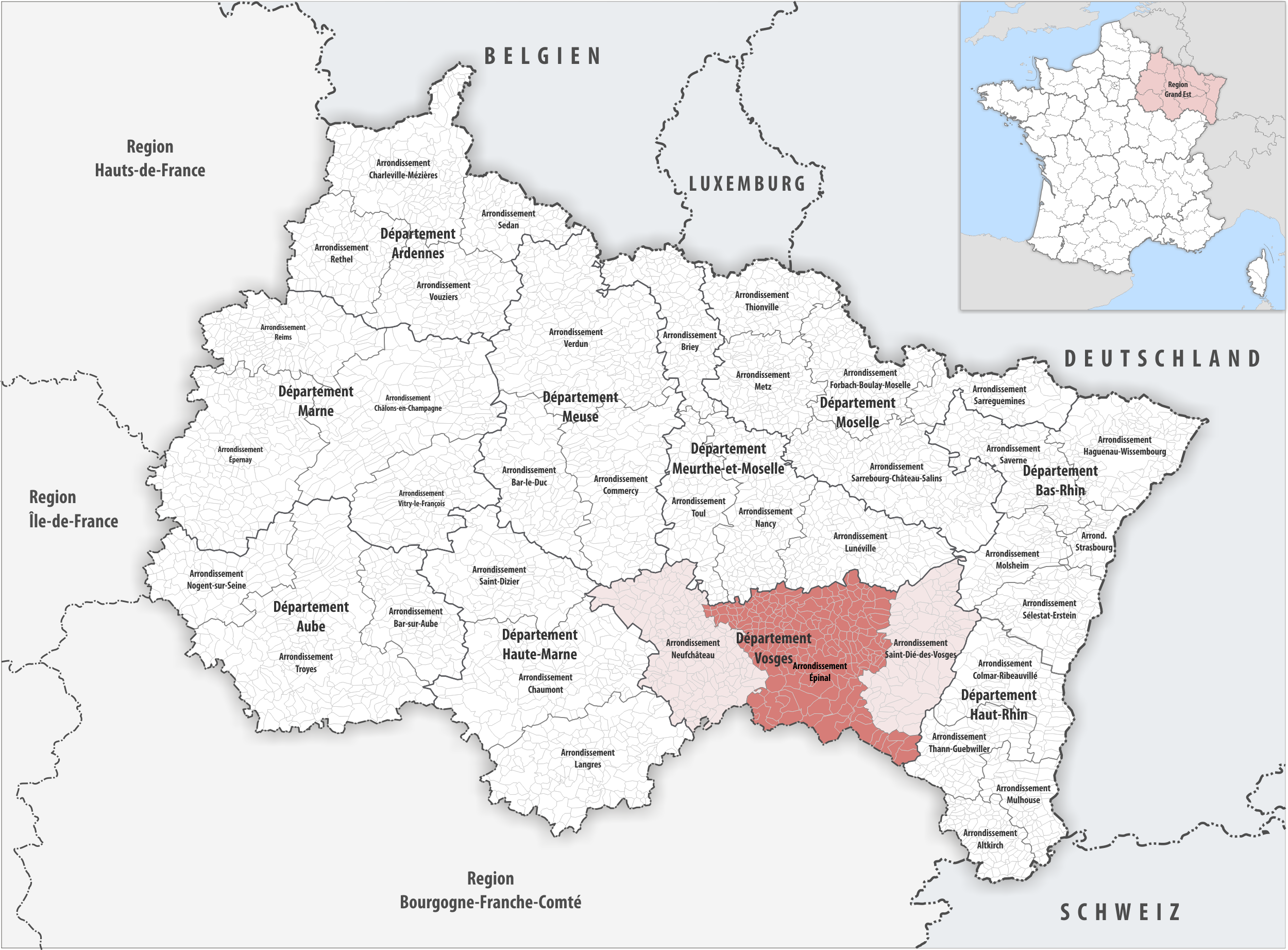
- Location within the region Grand Est
- Country: France
- Region: Grand Est
- Department: Vosges
- No. of communes: {{{nbcomm}}}
- Area: 2,209.7 km^{2} (853.2 sq mi)
- Population (2023): 186,880
  - Density: 84.573/km^{2} (219.04/sq mi)
- INSEE code: 881

The arrondissement of Épinal is an arrondissement of France in the Vosges department in the Grand Est region. It has 140 communes. Its population is 187,993 (2021), and its area is 2,209.7 km^{2} (853.2 sq mi).

== Composition ==
The communes of the arrondissement of Épinal, and their INSEE codes are:

1. Anglemont (88008)
2. Arches (88011)
3. Archettes (88012)
4. Autrey (88021)
5. Aydoilles (88026)
6. Badménil-aux-Bois (88027)
7. La Baffe (88028)
8. Basse-sur-le-Rupt (88037)
9. Bayecourt (88040)
10. Bazien (88042)
11. Bellefontaine (88048)
12. Brantigny (88073)
13. La Bresse (88075)
14. Brû (88077)
15. Bult (88080)
16. Bussang (88081)
17. Chamagne (88084)
18. Chantraine (88087)
19. La Chapelle-aux-Bois (88088)
20. Charmes (88090)
21. Charmois-l'Orgueilleux (88092)
22. Châtel-sur-Moselle (88094)
23. Chaumousey (88098)
24. Chavelot (88099)
25. Le Clerjus (88108)
26. Cleurie (88109)
27. Clézentaine (88110)
28. Cornimont (88116)
29. Damas-aux-Bois (88121)
30. Darnieulles (88126)
31. Deinvillers (88127)
32. Deyvillers (88132)
33. Dignonville (88133)
34. Dinozé (88134)
35. Dogneville (88136)
36. Domèvre-sur-Avière (88142)
37. Domèvre-sur-Durbion (88143)
38. Dommartin-lès-Remiremont (88148)
39. Dompierre (88152)
40. Domptail (88153)
41. Doncières (88156)
42. Dounoux (88157)
43. Éloyes (88158)
44. Épinal (88160)
45. Essegney (88163)
46. Fauconcourt (88168)
47. Ferdrupt (88170)
48. Florémont (88173)
49. Fomerey (88174)
50. Fontenoy-le-Château (88176)
51. La Forge (88177)
52. Les Forges (88178)
53. Fresse-sur-Moselle (88188)
54. Frizon (88190)
55. Gerbamont (88197)
56. Gigney (88200)
57. Girancourt (88201)
58. Girmont-Val-d'Ajol (88205)
59. Golbey (88209)
60. Gruey-lès-Surance (88221)
61. Hadigny-les-Verrières (88224)
62. Hadol (88225)
63. Haillainville (88228)
64. Hardancourt (88230)
65. La Haye (88236)
66. Hergugney (88239)
67. Housseras (88243)
68. Igney (88247)
69. Jarménil (88250)
70. Jeanménil (88251)
71. Jeuxey (88253)
72. Langley (88260)
73. Longchamp (88273)
74. Mazeley (88294)
75. Ménarmont (88298)
76. Le Ménil (88302)
77. Ménil-sur-Belvitte (88301)
78. Montmotier (88311)
79. Moriville (88313)
80. Moyemont (88318)
81. Nomexy (88327)
82. Nossoncourt (88333)
83. Ortoncourt (88338)
84. Padoux (88340)
85. Pallegney (88342)
86. Plombières-les-Bains (88351)
87. Portieux (88355)
88. Pouxeux (88358)
89. Rambervillers (88367)
90. Ramonchamp (88369)
91. Raon-aux-Bois (88371)
92. Rehaincourt (88379)
93. Remiremont (88383)
94. Renauvoid (88388)
95. Rochesson (88391)
96. Romont (88395)
97. Roville-aux-Chênes (88402)
98. Rugney (88406)
99. Rupt-sur-Moselle (88408)
100. Saint-Amé (88409)
101. Saint-Benoît-la-Chipotte (88412)
102. Sainte-Barbe (88410)
103. Sainte-Hélène (88418)
104. Saint-Étienne-lès-Remiremont (88415)
105. Saint-Genest (88416)
106. Saint-Gorgon (88417)
107. Saint-Maurice-sur-Mortagne (88425)
108. Saint-Maurice-sur-Moselle (88426)
109. Saint-Nabord (88429)
110. Saint-Pierremont (88432)
111. Sanchey (88439)
112. Sapois (88442)
113. Saulxures-sur-Moselotte (88447)
114. Savigny (88449)
115. Sercœur (88454)
116. Socourt (88458)
117. Le Syndicat (88462)
118. Tendon (88464)
119. Thaon-les-Vosges (88465)
120. Thiéfosse (88467)
121. Le Thillot (88468)
122. Trémonzey (88479)
123. Ubexy (88480)
124. Uriménil (88481)
125. Uxegney (88483)
126. Uzemain (88484)
127. Le Val-d'Ajol (88487)
128. Vagney (88486)
129. Vaudéville (88495)
130. Vaxoncourt (88497)
131. Vecoux (88498)
132. Ventron (88500)
133. Villoncourt (88509)
134. Vincey (88513)
135. La Vôge-les-Bains (88029)
136. Les Voivres (88520)
137. Vomécourt (88521)
138. Xaffévillers (88527)
139. Xertigny (88530)
140. Zincourt (88532)

== History ==
The arrondissement of Épinal was created in 1800. In January 2013 the two cantons of Darney and Monthureux-sur-Saône passed from the arrondissement of Épinal to the arrondissement of Neufchâteau. At the January 2019 reorganisation of the arrondissements of Vosges, it lost 2 communes to and gained 32 communes from the arrondissement of Neufchâteau, and it lost 15 communes to and gained 7 communes from the arrondissement of Saint-Dié-des-Vosges. At the January 2024 reorganisation of the arrondissements of Vosges, it lost 76 communes to the arrondissement of Neufchâteau, and it lost 34 communes to and gained 14 communes from the arrondissement of Saint-Dié-des-Vosges.

As a result of the reorganisation of the cantons of France which came into effect in 2015, the borders of the cantons are no longer related to the borders of the arrondissements. The cantons of the arrondissement of Épinal were, as of January 2015:

1. Bains-les-Bains
2. Bruyères
3. Charmes
4. Châtel-sur-Moselle
5. Dompaire
6. Épinal-Est
7. Épinal-Ouest
8. Plombières-les-Bains
9. Rambervillers
10. Remiremont
11. Saulxures-sur-Moselotte
12. Le Thillot
13. Xertigny
