= Sainte-Hélène, Vosges =

Sainte-Hélène
- Commune
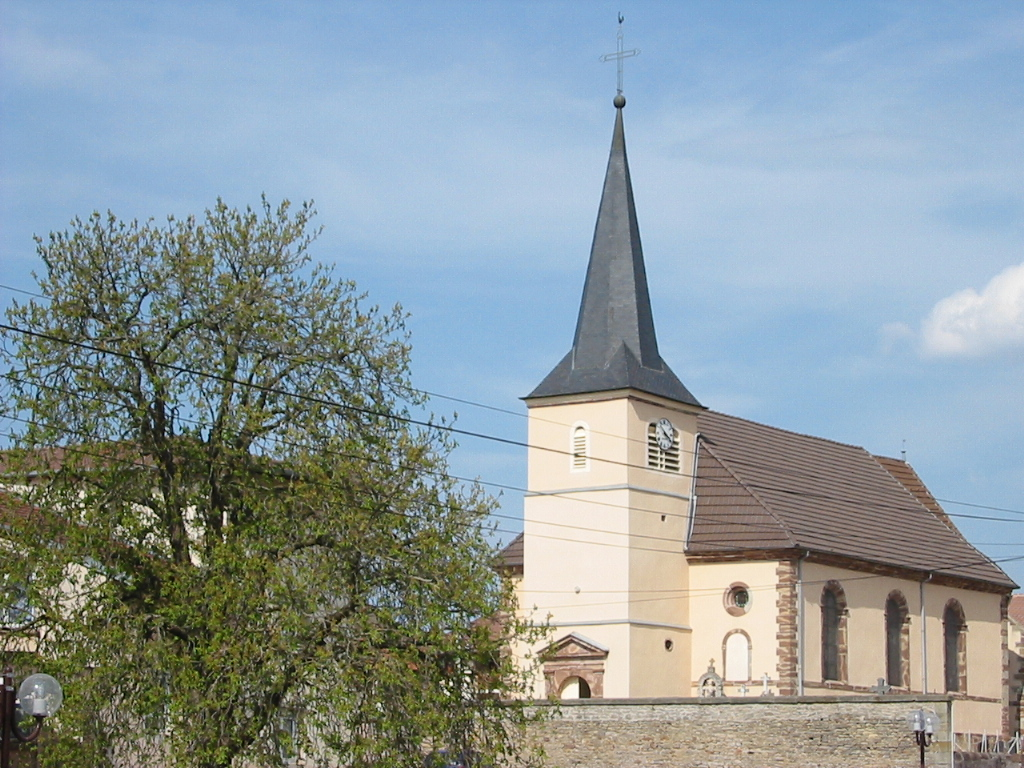
- Saint-Georges
- Location of Sainte-Hélène
- Location within France Location within Grand Est
- Coordinates: 48°17′28″N 6°39′26″E
- Country: France
- Region: Grand Est
- Department: Vosges
- Arrondissement: Épinal
- Canton: Bruyères
- Intercommunality: CC Région de Rambervillers

Government
  - Mayor (2020–2026): Michel Pourchert
- Area^{1}: 17.05 km^{2} (6.58 sq mi)
- Elevation: 316 m (1,037 ft)
- Highest elevation: 389 m (1,276 ft)
- Lowest elevation: 300 m (980 ft)
- Population (2023): 447
  - Density: 26.2/km^{2} (67.9/sq mi)
- Time zone: UTC+01:00 (CET)
  - Summer (DST): UTC+02:00 (CEST)
- INSEE/Postal code: 88418 /88700
- ^{1} French Land Register data, which excludes lakes, ponds, glaciers > 1 km^{2} (0.386 sq mi or 247 acres) and river estuaries.

Sainte-Hélène (French pronunciation: [sɛ̃t elɛn]) is a commune in the Vosges department in Grand Est in northeastern France.

== Geography ==
The village lies in the middle of the commune, on the right bank of the Arentèle, a tributary of the Mortagne, which forms most of the commune's eastern border.

== See also ==
- Communes of the Vosges department
