= Communauté de communes de la Région de Rambervillers =

Federation of municipalities in France

Région de Rambervillers
- Communauté de communes
- Interactive map of Région de Rambervillers
- Coordinates: 48°21′N 06°38′E
- Country: France
- Region: Grand Est
- Department: Vosges
- No. of communes: {{{nbcomm}}}
- Established: 2006
- Area: 328.8 km^{2} (127.0 sq mi)
- Population (2019): 12,999
  - Density: 39.53/km^{2} (102.4/sq mi)

The Communauté de communes de la Région de Rambervillers is an administrative association of communes in the Vosges département of eastern France and in the region of Grand Est. It has its administrative offices at Rambervillers. Its area is 328.8 km^{2}, and its population was 12,999 in 2019.

== Composition ==
As of 2022, the association comprises 30 communes:

1. Anglemont
2. Autrey
3. Bazien
4. Brû
5. Bult
6. Clézentaine
7. Deinvillers
8. Domptail
9. Doncières
10. Fauconcourt
11. Hardancourt
12. Housseras
13. Jeanménil
14. Ménarmont
15. Ménil-sur-Belvitte
16. Moyemont
17. Nossoncourt
18. Ortoncourt
19. Rambervillers
20. Romont
21. Roville-aux-Chênes
22. Saint-Benoît-la-Chipotte
23. Sainte-Barbe
24. Sainte-Hélène
25. Saint-Genest
26. Saint-Gorgon
27. Saint-Maurice-sur-Mortagne
28. Saint-Pierremont
29. Vomécourt
30. Xaffévillers
