= Canton of Saint-Dié-des-Vosges-1 =

Coordinates: 48.29°N 6.94°E

- Canton
- Interactive map of Canton of Saint-Dié-des-Vosges-1
- Country: France
- Region: Grand Est
- Department: Vosges
- No. of communes: {{{nbcomm}}}
- Area: 129 km^{2} (50 sq mi)
- Population (2023): 23,795
  - Density: 184/km^{2} (478/sq mi)
- INSEE code: 8813

The canton of Saint-Dié-des-Vosges-1 is an administrative division of the Vosges department, in northeastern France. It was created at the French canton reorganisation which came into effect in March 2015. Its seat is in Saint-Dié-des-Vosges.

It consists of the following communes:

- Autrey
- La Bourgonce
- Housseras
- Jeanménil
- Rambervillers
- Saint-Dié-des-Vosges (partly)
- Saint-Gorgon
- Saint-Michel-sur-Meurthe
- La Salle
- Taintrux
- La Voivre
