= Romont, West Virginia =

- Unincorporated community
- Location within West Virginia Location within the United States
- Coordinates: 38°10′53″N 81°6′14″W
- Country: United States
- State: West Virginia
- County: Fayette
- Elevation: 1,165 ft (355 m)
- Time zone: UTC-5 (Eastern (EST))
  - Summer (DST): UTC-4 (EDT)
- GNIS ID: 1549905

Romont is an unincorporated community in Fayette County, West Virginia, United States. Romont is characterized by its rural setting and proximity to natural landscapes.
