= Bult =

- Commune
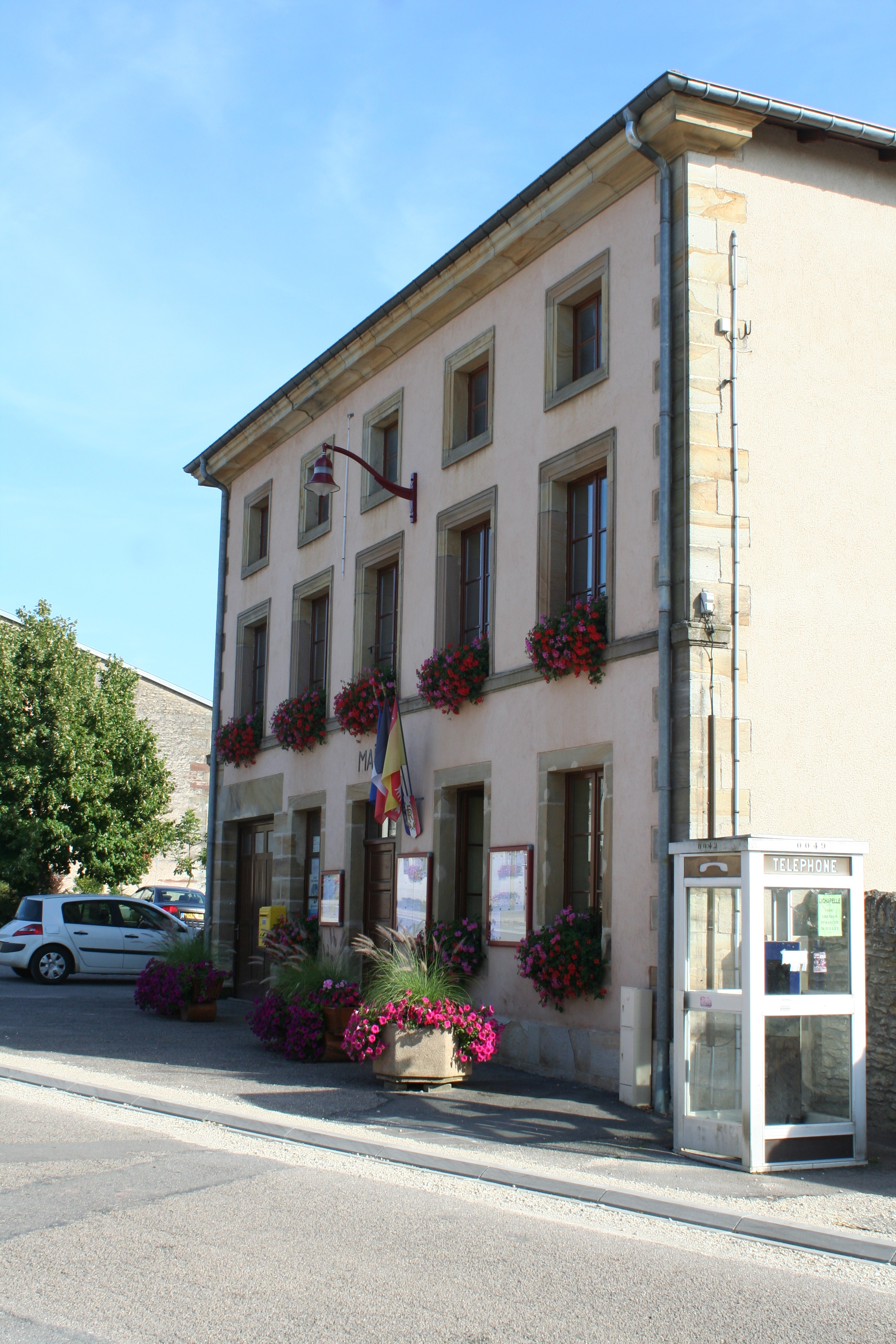
- The town hall in Bult

- Coat of arms
- Location of Bult
- Location within France Location within Grand Est
- Coordinates: 48°17′41″N 6°36′21″E
- Country: France
- Region: Grand Est
- Department: Vosges
- Arrondissement: Épinal
- Canton: Charmes
- Intercommunality: CC Région de Rambervillers

Government
  - Mayor (2020–2026): Gabriel Pierre
- Area^{1}: 9.86 km^{2} (3.81 sq mi)
- Elevation: 345 m (1,132 ft)
- Highest elevation: 352 m (1,155 ft)
- Lowest elevation: 292 m (958 ft)
- Population (2023): 301
  - Density: 30.5/km^{2} (79.1/sq mi)
- Time zone: UTC+01:00 (CET)
  - Summer (DST): UTC+02:00 (CEST)
- INSEE/Postal code: 88080 /88700
- ^{1} French Land Register data, which excludes lakes, ponds, glaciers > 1 km^{2} (0.386 sq mi or 247 acres) and river estuaries.

Bult (French pronunciation: [bylt]) is a commune in the Vosges department in Grand Est in northeastern France.

== See also ==
- Communes of the Vosges department
