= Ménil-sur-Belvitte =

- Commune
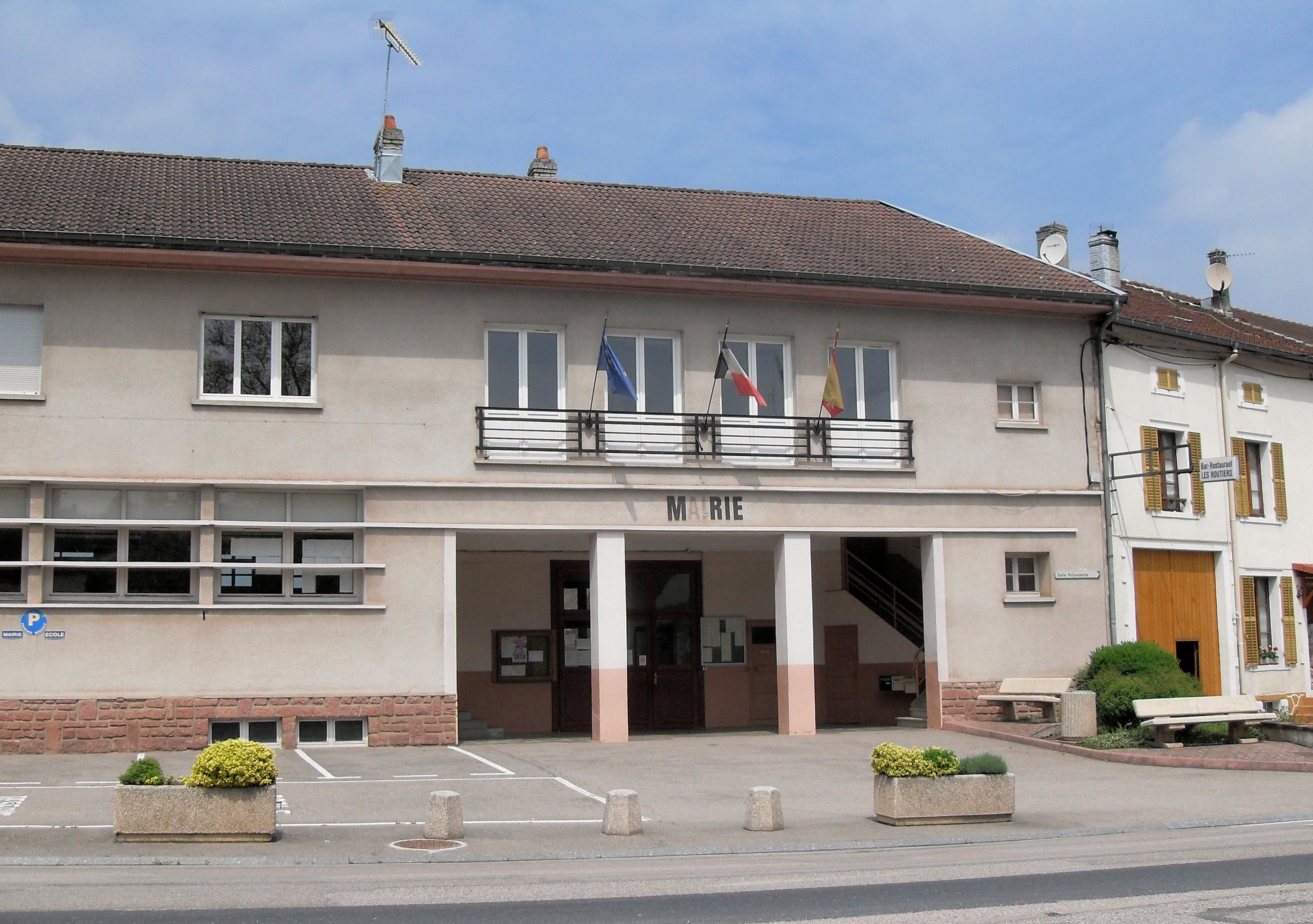
- The town hall in Ménil-sur-Belvitte

- Coat of arms
- Location of Ménil-sur-Belvitte
- Location within France Location within Grand Est
- Coordinates: 48°23′27″N 6°41′32″E
- Country: France
- Region: Grand Est
- Department: Vosges
- Arrondissement: Épinal
- Canton: Raon-l'Étape
- Intercommunality: CC Région de Rambervillers

Government
  - Mayor (2020–2026): Emmanuel Parvé
- Area^{1}: 8.6 km^{2} (3.3 sq mi)
- Elevation: 288 m (945 ft)
- Highest elevation: 384 m (1,260 ft)
- Lowest elevation: 272 m (892 ft)
- Population (2023): 288
  - Density: 33/km^{2} (87/sq mi)
- Time zone: UTC+01:00 (CET)
  - Summer (DST): UTC+02:00 (CEST)
- INSEE/Postal code: 88301 /88700
- ^{1} French Land Register data, which excludes lakes, ponds, glaciers > 1 km^{2} (0.386 sq mi or 247 acres) and river estuaries.

Ménil-sur-Belvitte is a commune in the Vosges department in Grand Est in northeastern France.

Inhabitants are called Ménilois.

== Geography ==
The village is equidistant between Rambervillers and Baccarat, approximately 7 kilometres (4 mi) from each. The Belvitte which flows through the village is a tributary to the Mortagne, which itself flows into the Meurthe.

== Personalities ==
The distinguished organist Gaston Litaize 1901 - 1991 was born at Ménil-sur-Belvitte.

== See also ==
- Communes of the Vosges department
