= Roville-aux-Chênes =

- Commune
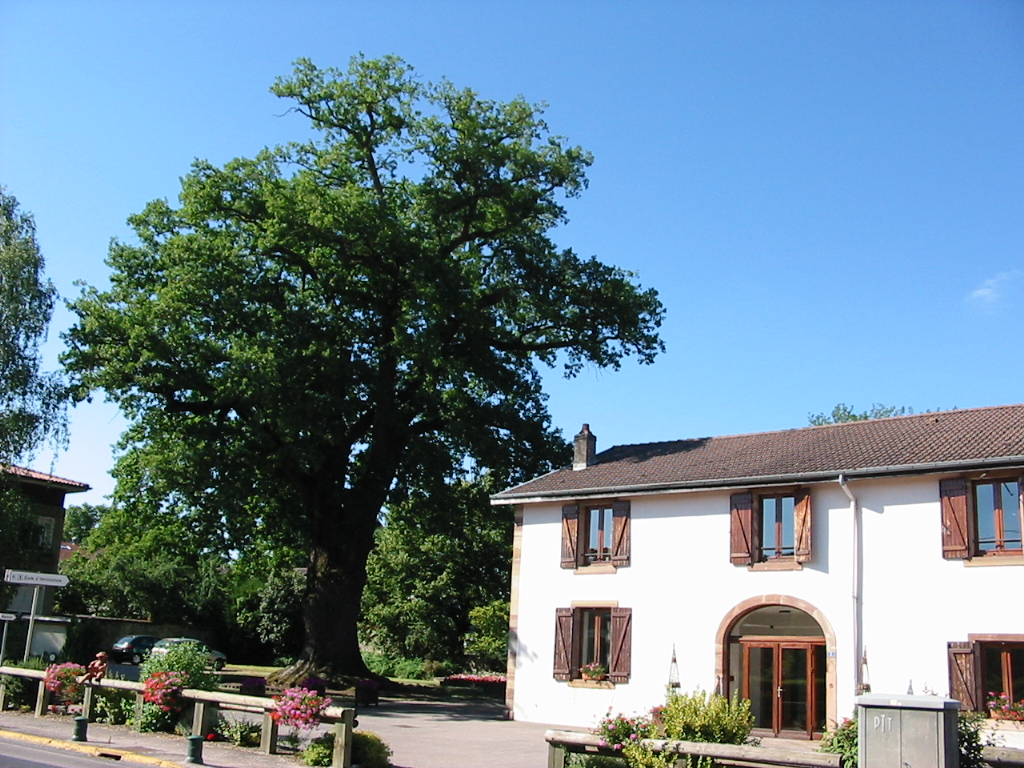
- Old oak tree and town hall
- Location of Roville-aux-Chênes
- Location within France Location within Grand Est
- Coordinates: 48°23′09″N 6°36′15″E
- Country: France
- Region: Grand Est
- Department: Vosges
- Arrondissement: Épinal
- Canton: Raon-l'Étape
- Intercommunality: CC Région de Rambervillers

Government
  - Mayor (2020–2026): Alain Aigle
- Area^{1}: 8.59 km^{2} (3.32 sq mi)
- Elevation: 276 m (906 ft)
- Highest elevation: 321 m (1,053 ft)
- Lowest elevation: 260 m (850 ft)
- Population (2023): 350
  - Density: 41/km^{2} (110/sq mi)
- Time zone: UTC+01:00 (CET)
  - Summer (DST): UTC+02:00 (CEST)
- INSEE/Postal code: 88402 /88700
- ^{1} French Land Register data, which excludes lakes, ponds, glaciers > 1 km^{2} (0.386 sq mi or 247 acres) and river estuaries.

Roville-aux-Chênes (French pronunciation: [ʁɔvil o ʃɛːn]) is a commune in the Vosges department in Grand Est in northeastern France.

== Geography ==
The river Mortagne forms part of the commune's western border.

== See also ==
- Communes of the Vosges department
