= Jeanménil =

- Commune
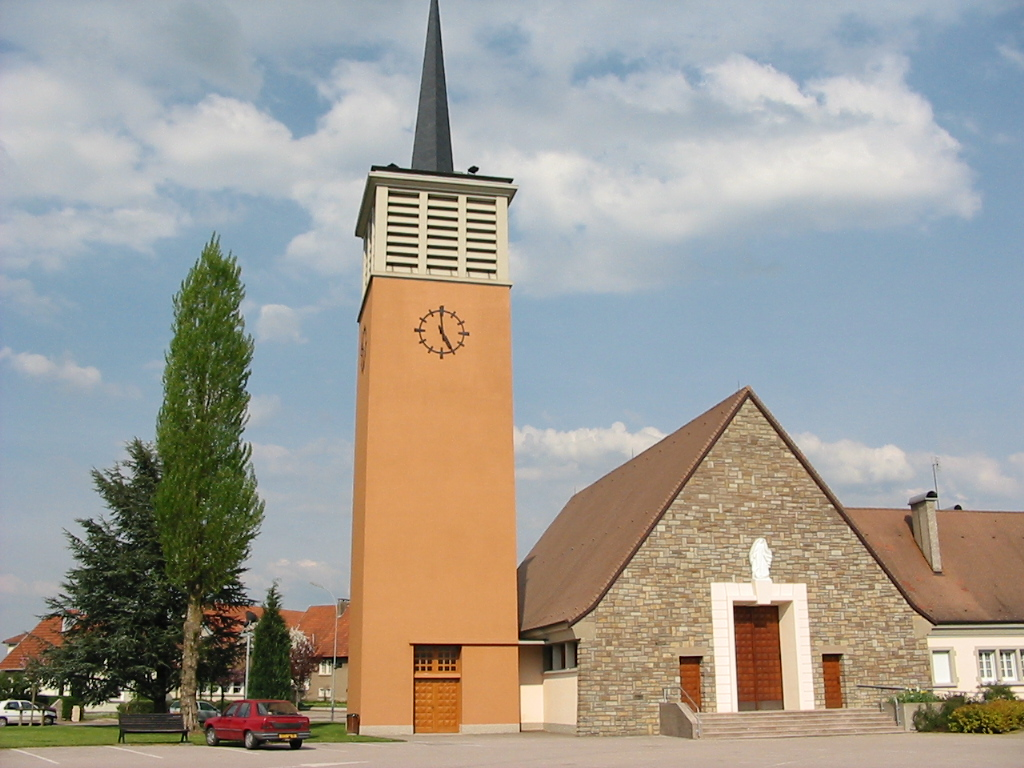
- Church of the Assumption of the Virgin

- Coat of arms
- Location of Jeanménil
- Location within France Location within Grand Est
- Coordinates: 48°20′10″N 6°41′19″E
- Country: France
- Region: Grand Est
- Department: Vosges
- Arrondissement: Épinal
- Canton: Saint-Dié-des-Vosges-1
- Intercommunality: CC Région de Rambervillers

Government
  - Mayor (2020–2026): Dominique Georgé
- Area^{1}: 18.24 km^{2} (7.04 sq mi)
- Elevation: 350 m (1,150 ft)
- Highest elevation: 527 m (1,729 ft)
- Lowest elevation: 293 m (961 ft)
- Population (2023): 1,106
  - Density: 60.64/km^{2} (157.0/sq mi)
- Time zone: UTC+01:00 (CET)
  - Summer (DST): UTC+02:00 (CEST)
- INSEE/Postal code: 88251 /88700
- ^{1} French Land Register data, which excludes lakes, ponds, glaciers > 1 km^{2} (0.386 sq mi or 247 acres) and river estuaries.

Jeanménil (French pronunciation: [ʒɑ̃menil]) is a commune in the Vosges department in Grand Est in northeastern France.

== Geography ==
The river Mortagne forms part of the commune's western border.

== See also ==
- Communes of the Vosges department
