= Saint-Gorgon, Vosges =

Saint-Gorgon
- Commune
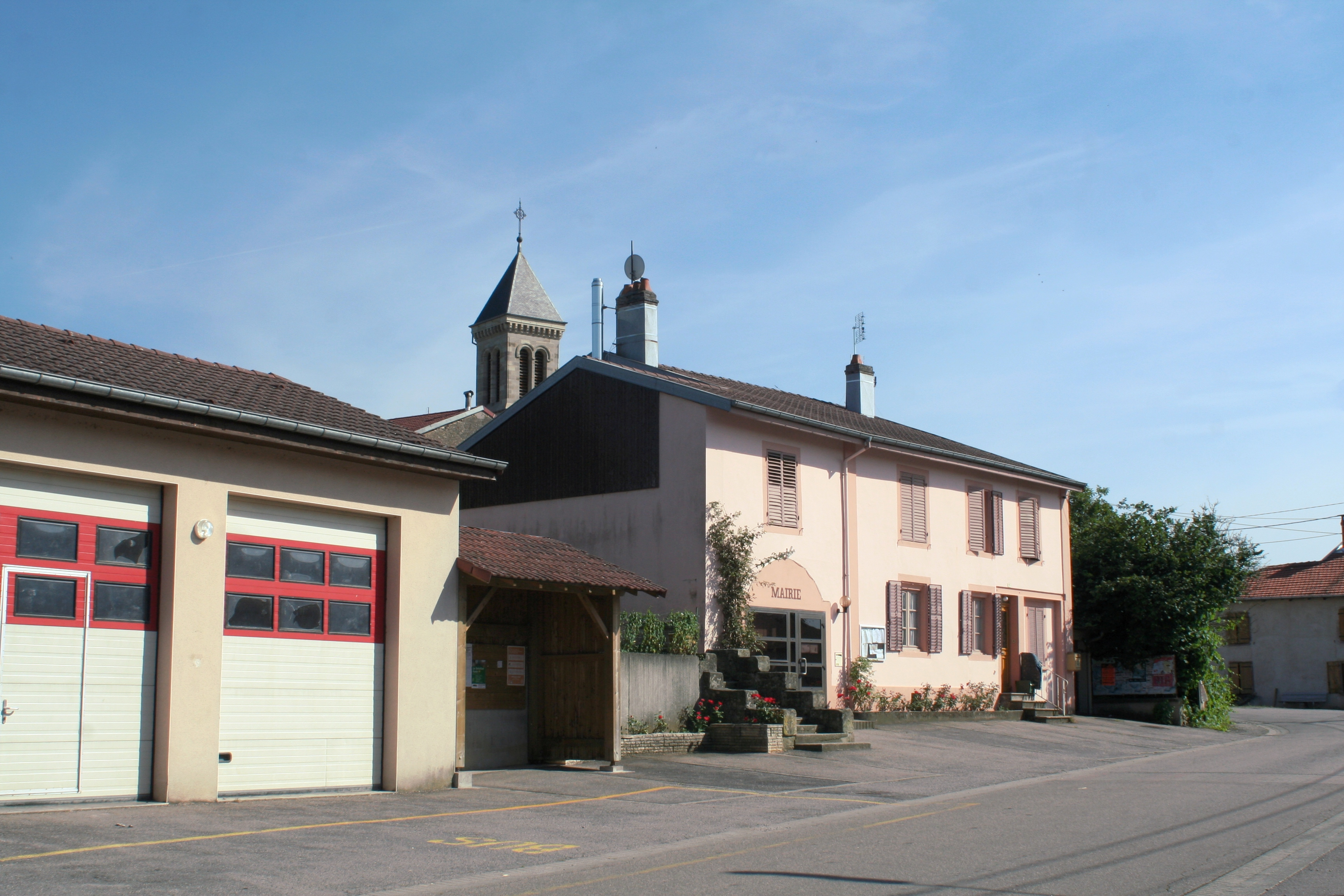
- Town hall
- Location of Saint-Gorgon
- Location within France Location within Grand Est
- Coordinates: 48°19′29″N 6°38′57″E
- Country: France
- Region: Grand Est
- Department: Vosges
- Arrondissement: Épinal
- Canton: Saint-Dié-des-Vosges-1
- Intercommunality: CC Région de Rambervillers

Government
  - Mayor (2020–2026): Michel Gasse
- Area^{1}: 5.77 km^{2} (2.23 sq mi)
- Elevation: 303 m (994 ft)
- Highest elevation: 347 m (1,138 ft)
- Lowest elevation: 287 m (942 ft)
- Population (2023): 359
  - Density: 62.2/km^{2} (161/sq mi)
- Time zone: UTC+01:00 (CET)
  - Summer (DST): UTC+02:00 (CEST)
- INSEE/Postal code: 88417 /88700
- ^{1} French Land Register data, which excludes lakes, ponds, glaciers > 1 km^{2} (0.386 sq mi or 247 acres) and river estuaries.

Saint-Gorgon (French pronunciation: [sɛ̃ ɡɔʁɡɔ̃]) is a commune in the Vosges department in Grand Est in northeastern France.

== Geography ==
The river Mortagne forms part of the commune's northern border.

== See also ==
- Communes of the Vosges department
