= Ménarmont =

- Commune
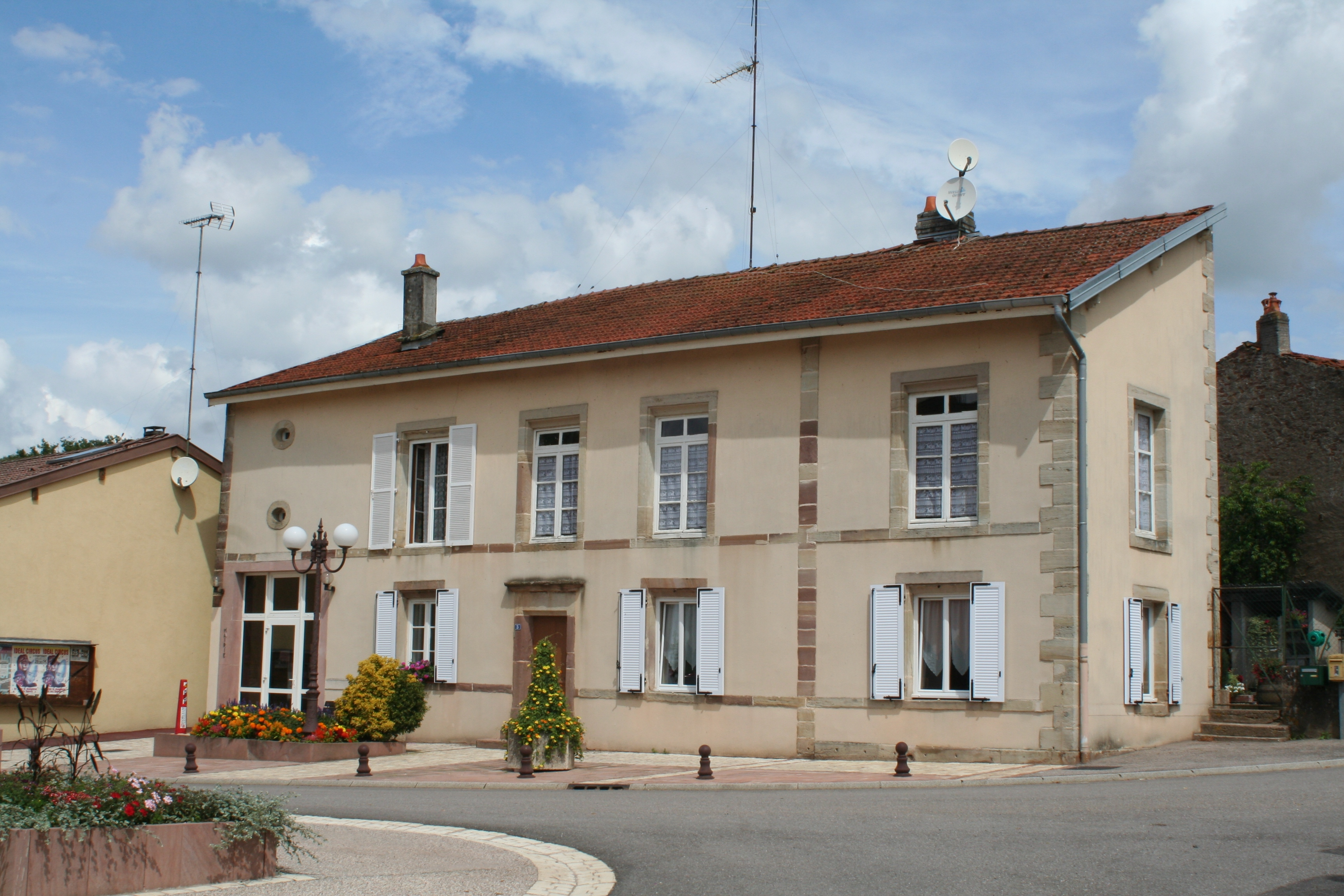
- The town hall in Ménarmont
- Location of Ménarmont
- Location within France Location within Grand Est
- Coordinates: 48°25′18″N 6°38′37″E
- Country: France
- Region: Grand Est
- Department: Vosges
- Arrondissement: Épinal
- Canton: Raon-l'Étape
- Intercommunality: CC Région de Rambervillers

Government
  - Mayor (2020–2026): Patrick Pierillas
- Area^{1}: 5.24 km^{2} (2.02 sq mi)
- Elevation: 290 m (950 ft)
- Highest elevation: 347 m (1,138 ft)
- Lowest elevation: 265 m (869 ft)
- Population (2023): 58
  - Density: 11/km^{2} (29/sq mi)
- Time zone: UTC+01:00 (CET)
  - Summer (DST): UTC+02:00 (CEST)
- INSEE/Postal code: 88298 /88700
- ^{1} French Land Register data, which excludes lakes, ponds, glaciers > 1 km^{2} (0.386 sq mi or 247 acres) and river estuaries.

Ménarmont (French pronunciation: [menaʁmɔ̃]) is a commune in the Vosges department in Grand Est in northeastern France.

== Geography ==
The village is on the northern edge of the Vosges, on the departmental frontier with the département of Meurthe et Moselle.

The countryside here is less densely populated than that closer to Épinal (some 30 kilometres/20 miles to the south-south-west), and since 1977 the local landfill site has welcomed 150,000 tonnes annually of domestic and industrial waste. Plans to extend the site after it became full in 2005 were hotly contested by neighbouring communes, notably Bazien to the north-west.

== See also ==
- Communes of the Vosges department
