= Hardancourt =

- Commune
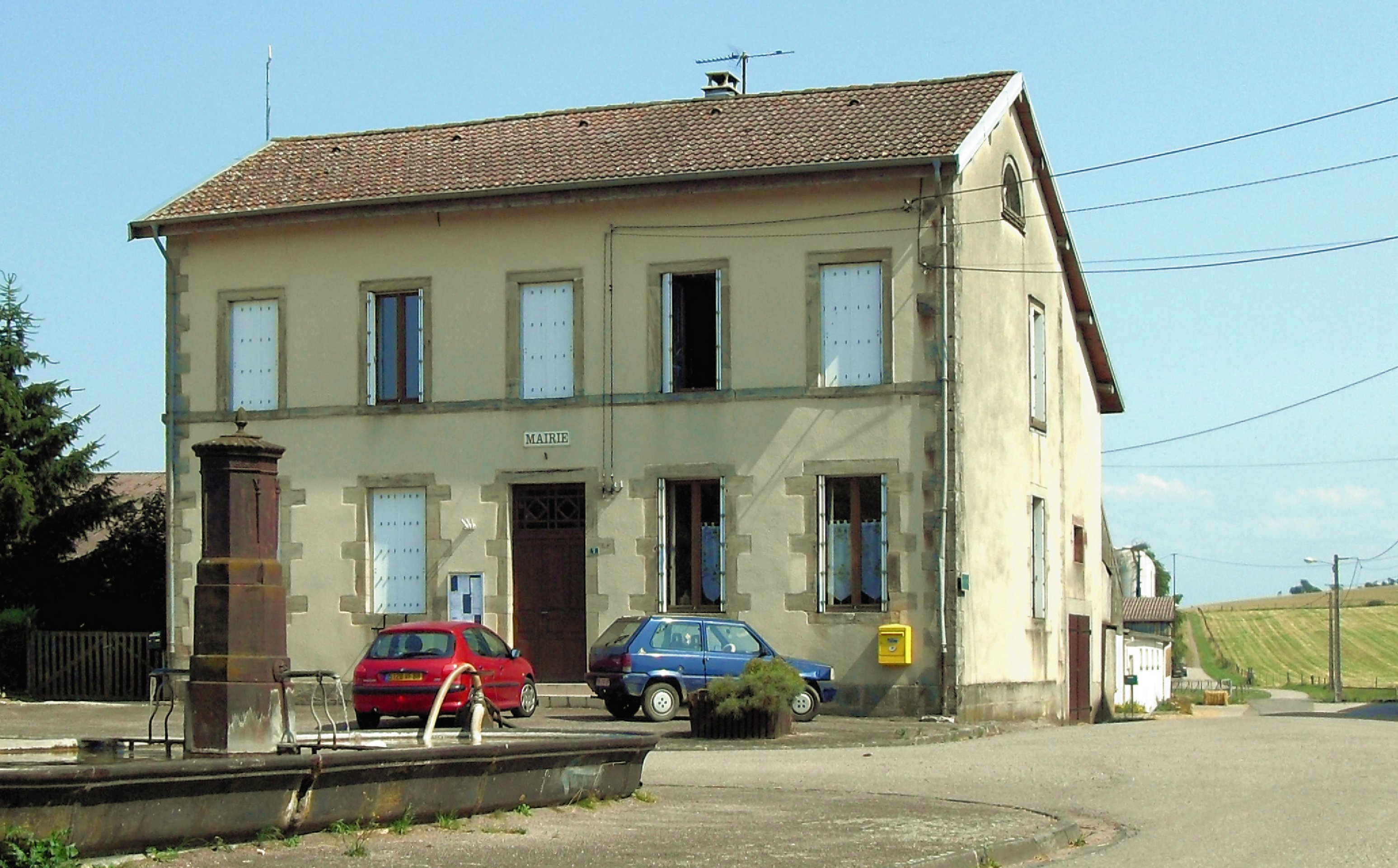
- The town hall in Hardancourt
- Location of Hardancourt
- Location within France Location within Grand Est
- Coordinates: 48°22′44″N 6°34′08″E
- Country: France
- Region: Grand Est
- Department: Vosges
- Arrondissement: Épinal
- Canton: Charmes
- Intercommunality: CC Région de Rambervillers

Government
  - Mayor (2020–2026): Hervé Bertrand
- Area^{1}: 3.33 km^{2} (1.29 sq mi)
- Highest elevation: 332 m (1,089 ft)
- Lowest elevation: 269 m (883 ft)
- Population (2023): 34
  - Density: 10/km^{2} (26/sq mi)
- Time zone: UTC+01:00 (CET)
  - Summer (DST): UTC+02:00 (CEST)
- INSEE/Postal code: 88230 /88700
- ^{1} French Land Register data, which excludes lakes, ponds, glaciers > 1 km^{2} (0.386 sq mi or 247 acres) and river estuaries.

Hardancourt (French pronunciation: [aʁdɑ̃kuʁ]) is a commune in the Vosges department in Grand Est in northeastern France.

== See also ==
- Communes of the Vosges department
