= Saint-Maurice-sur-Mortagne =

- Commune
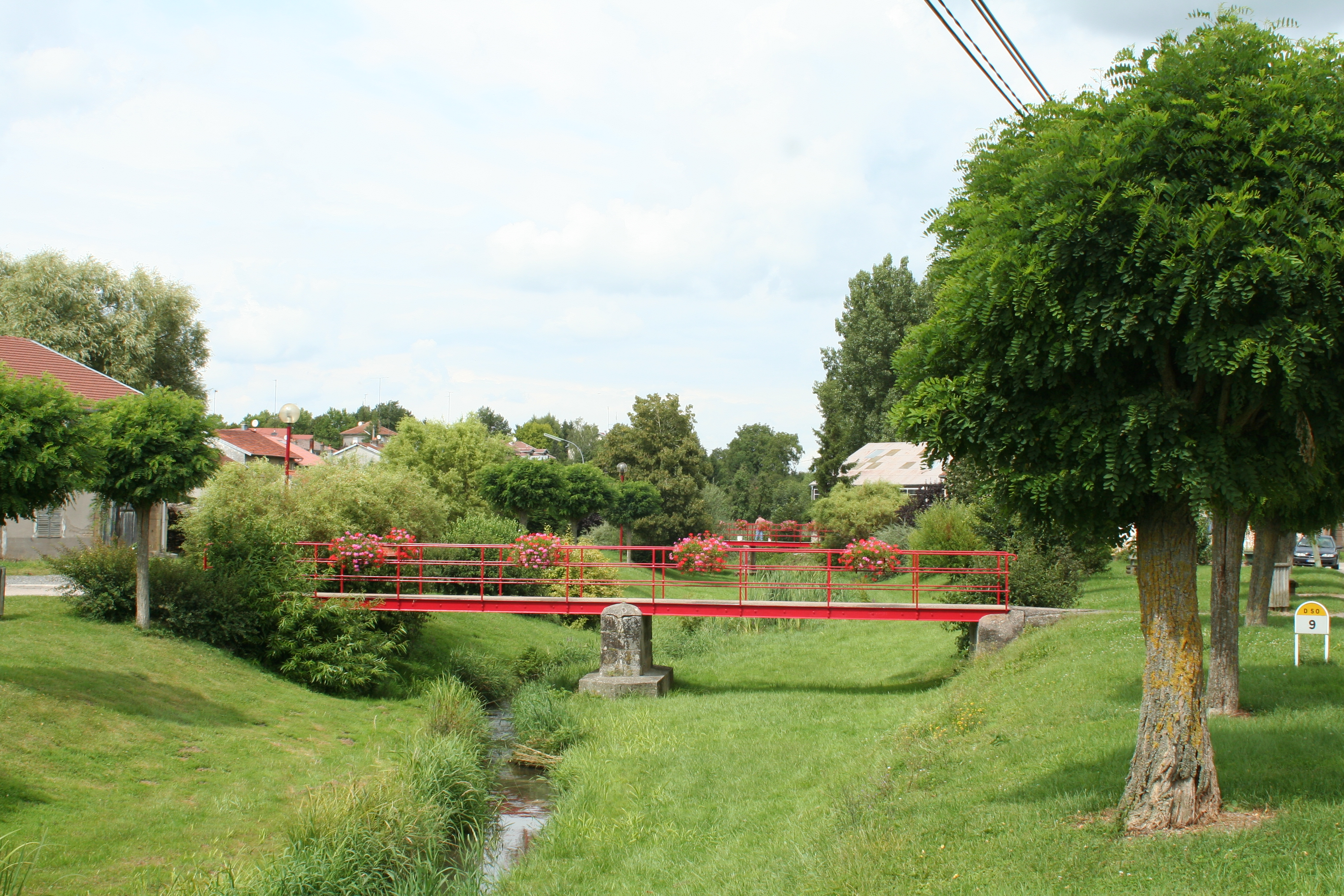
- The Nauve
- Location of Saint-Maurice-sur-Mortagne
- Location within France Location within Grand Est
- Coordinates: 48°23′14″N 6°35′03″E
- Country: France
- Region: Grand Est
- Department: Vosges
- Arrondissement: Épinal
- Canton: Charmes
- Intercommunality: Région de Rambervillers

Government
  - Mayor (2020–2026): Michel Herbé
- Area^{1}: 6.78 km^{2} (2.62 sq mi)
- Elevation: 315 m (1,033 ft)
- Highest elevation: 325 m (1,066 ft)
- Lowest elevation: 257 m (843 ft)
- Population (2023): 182
  - Density: 26.8/km^{2} (69.5/sq mi)
- Time zone: UTC+01:00 (CET)
  - Summer (DST): UTC+02:00 (CEST)
- INSEE/Postal code: 88425 /88700
- ^{1} French Land Register data, which excludes lakes, ponds, glaciers > 1 km^{2} (0.386 sq mi or 247 acres) and river estuaries.

Saint-Maurice-sur-Mortagne (French pronunciation: [sɛ̃ mɔʁis syʁ mɔʁtaɲ]) is a commune in the Vosges department in Grand Est in northeastern France.

== Geography ==
The river Mortagne forms most of the commune's eastern border.

== Population ==
Historical population
Year	Pop.	±% p.a.
1968	173	—
1975	156	−1.47%
1982	143	−1.24%
1990	163	+1.65%
1999	163	+0.00%
2007	177	+1.04%
2012	184	+0.78%
2017	181	−0.33%
2023	182	+0.09%
Source: INSEE

== See also ==
- Communes of the Vosges department
