= Moyemont =

- Commune
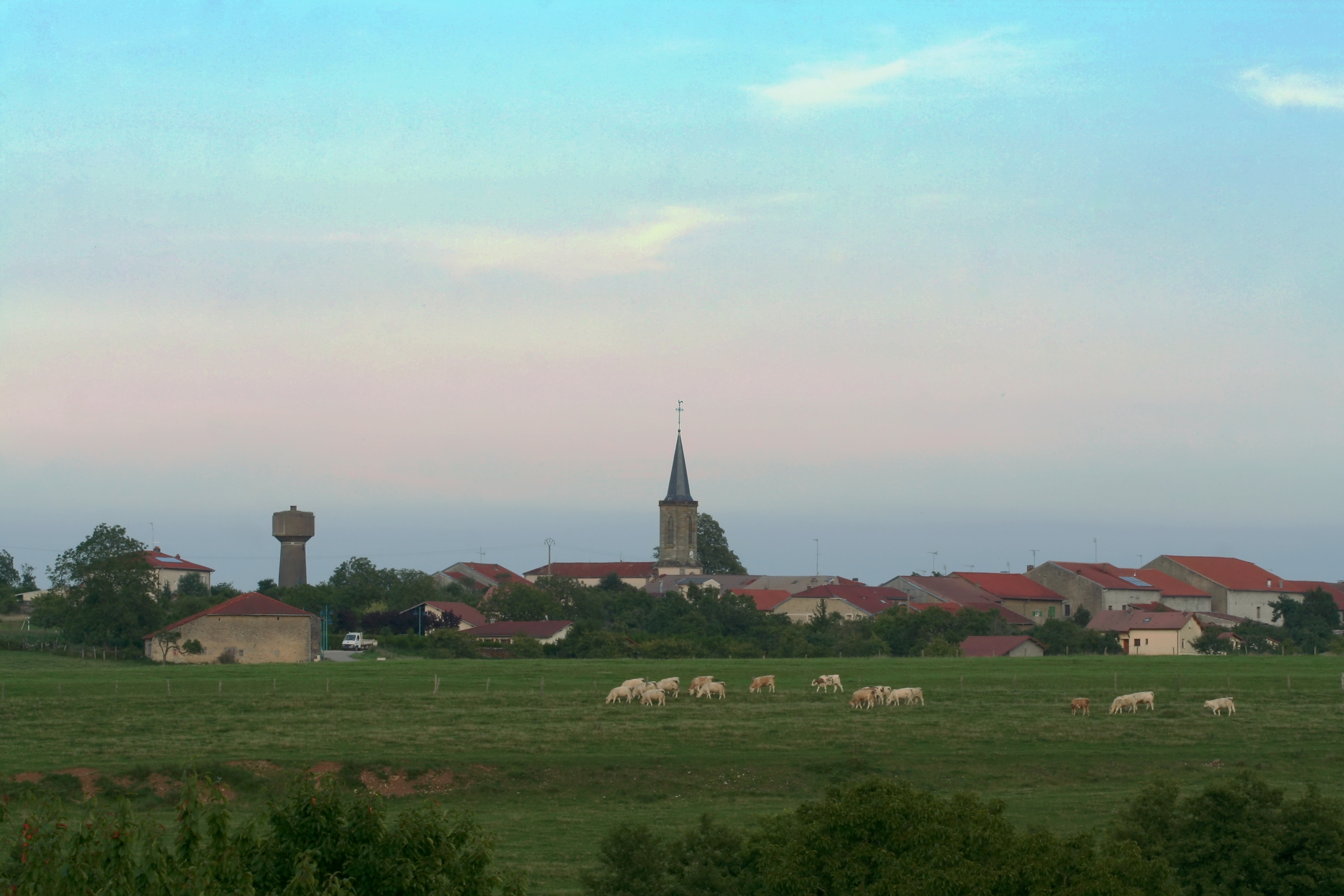
- A general view of Moyemont

- Coat of arms
- Location of Moyemont
- Location within France Location within Grand Est
- Coordinates: 48°21′06″N 6°32′23″E
- Country: France
- Region: Grand Est
- Department: Vosges
- Arrondissement: Épinal
- Canton: Charmes
- Intercommunality: CC Région de Rambervillers

Government
  - Mayor (2020–2026): Patrice Herbé
- Area^{1}: 12.3 km^{2} (4.7 sq mi)
- Elevation: 333 m (1,093 ft)
- Highest elevation: 367 m (1,204 ft)
- Lowest elevation: 274 m (899 ft)
- Population (2023): 220
  - Density: 18/km^{2} (46/sq mi)
- Time zone: UTC+01:00 (CET)
  - Summer (DST): UTC+02:00 (CEST)
- INSEE/Postal code: 88318 /88700
- ^{1} French Land Register data, which excludes lakes, ponds, glaciers > 1 km^{2} (0.386 sq mi or 247 acres) and river estuaries.

Moyemont (French pronunciation: [mwajmɔ̃]) is a commune in the Vosges department in Grand Est in northeastern France.

== Geography ==
Moyemont is a rural commune positioned between Charmes to the west and Rambervillers some 7 kilometres (4 mi) to the east. To the south of the village, more than half of the commune's 1,230 hectares are covered by forest (le forêt de Rambervillers). Two small streams, the Habu and the ForePrays (le devant Prays), both tributaries of the Mortagne flow towards the north-east, while in the south of the commune other streams flow to the south and south-east, reflecting commune's modestly elevated topography. The village itself is at the confluence of several small roads, with a lay-out in an irregular star shape resulting. The least minor of the roads crossing the village is the Route Departmentale RD32.

== History ==
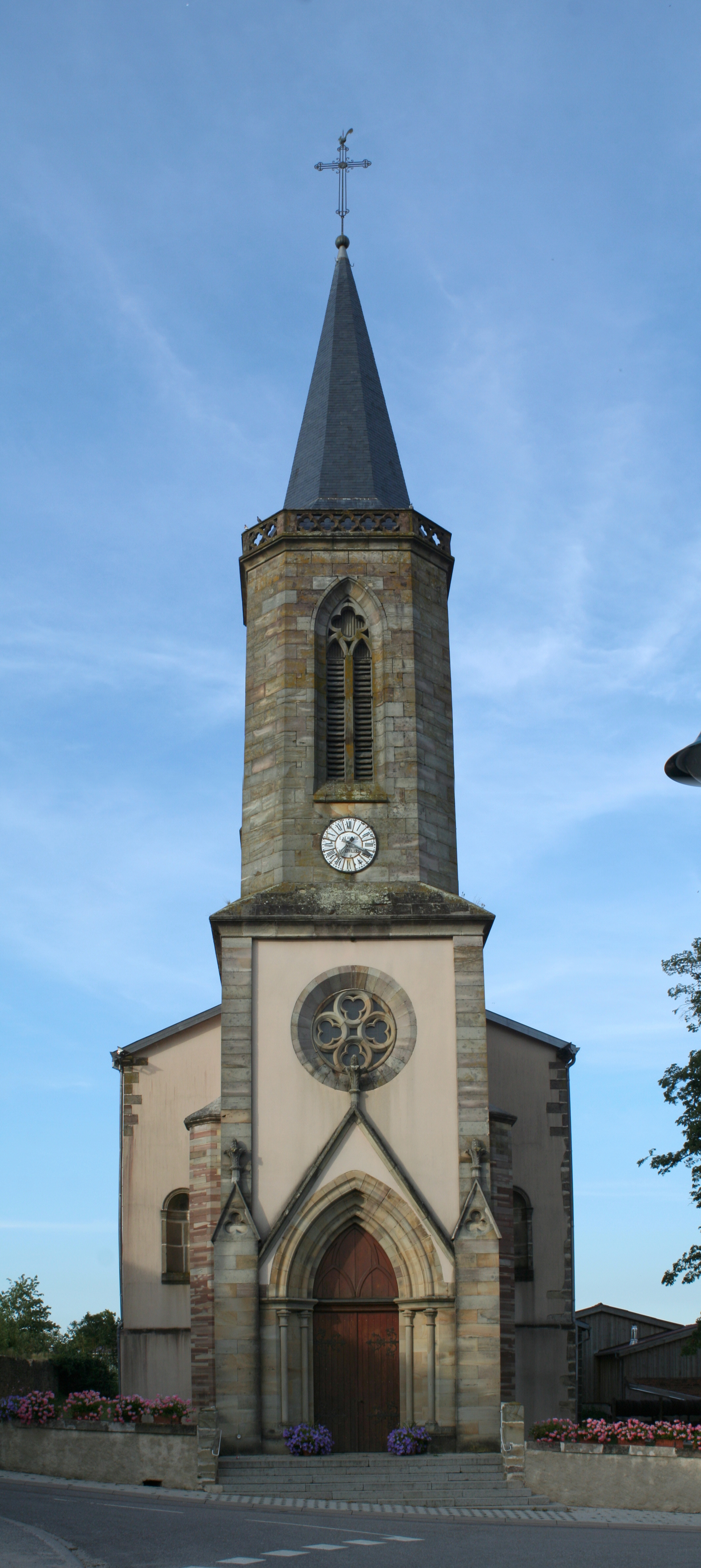
Saint-Pierre-ès-Liens church

There is evidence of a settlement at Moyement during the Gallo-Roman period, when it was positioned along the road linking Strasbourg with Langres.

In 1114 it gets a mention in a surviving record as the Lordship of Moyemont, controlled by the Chapter of Saint-Dié. By 1751 Moyemont was listed under the bailiwick of Lunéville and in 1790 it was within the district of Épinal under the canton of Domèvre-sur-Avière. The present administrative relationships are, in most respect, based on the administrative structures created across France in the wake of the French Revolution.

commune in the Vosges department in Grand Est in northeastern France.

== See also ==
- Communes of the Vosges department
