= Domptail =

- Commune
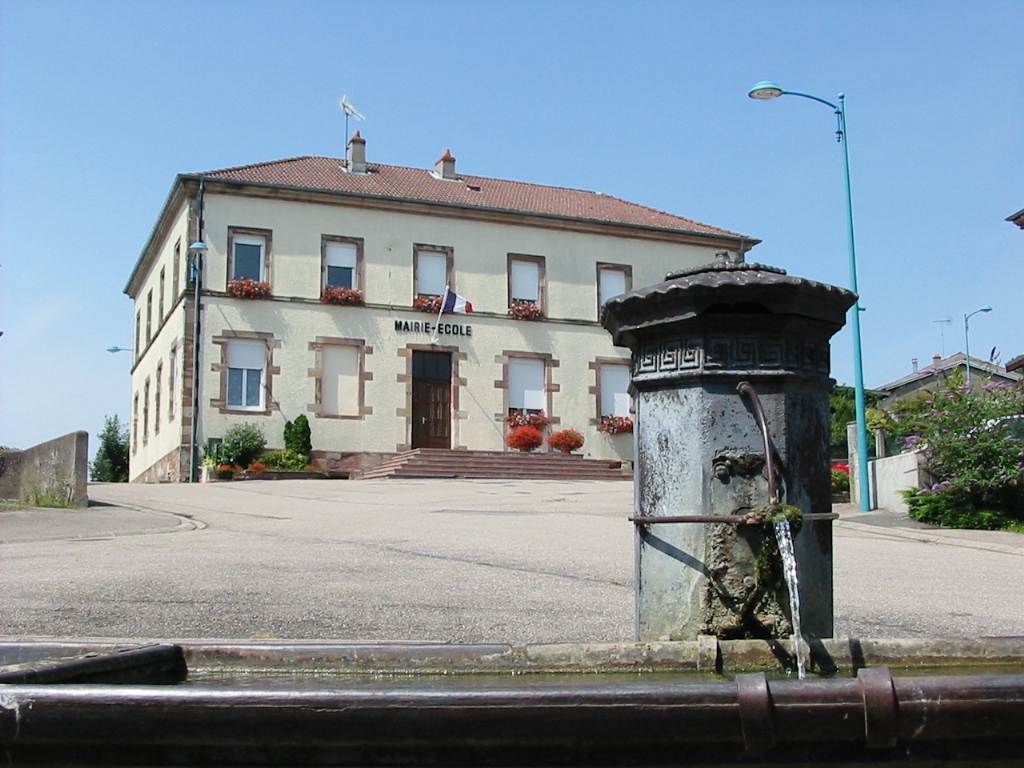
- Town hall and school
- Location of Domptail
- Location within France Location within Grand Est
- Coordinates: 48°26′50″N 6°37′01″E
- Country: France
- Region: Grand Est
- Department: Vosges
- Arrondissement: Épinal
- Canton: Raon-l'Étape
- Intercommunality: CC Région de Rambervillers

Government
  - Mayor (2020–2026): Michel Jacquot
- Area^{1}: 18.63 km^{2} (7.19 sq mi)
- Elevation: 299 m (981 ft)
- Highest elevation: 372 m (1,220 ft)
- Lowest elevation: 252 m (827 ft)
- Population (2023): 334
  - Density: 17.9/km^{2} (46.4/sq mi)
- Time zone: UTC+01:00 (CET)
  - Summer (DST): UTC+02:00 (CEST)
- INSEE/Postal code: 88153 /88700
- ^{1} French Land Register data, which excludes lakes, ponds, glaciers > 1 km^{2} (0.386 sq mi or 247 acres) and river estuaries.

Domptail (French pronunciation: [dɔ̃taj]) is a commune in the Vosges department in Grand Est in northeastern France.

== See also ==
- Communes of the Vosges department
