= Saint-Genest, Vosges =

Saint-Genest
- Commune
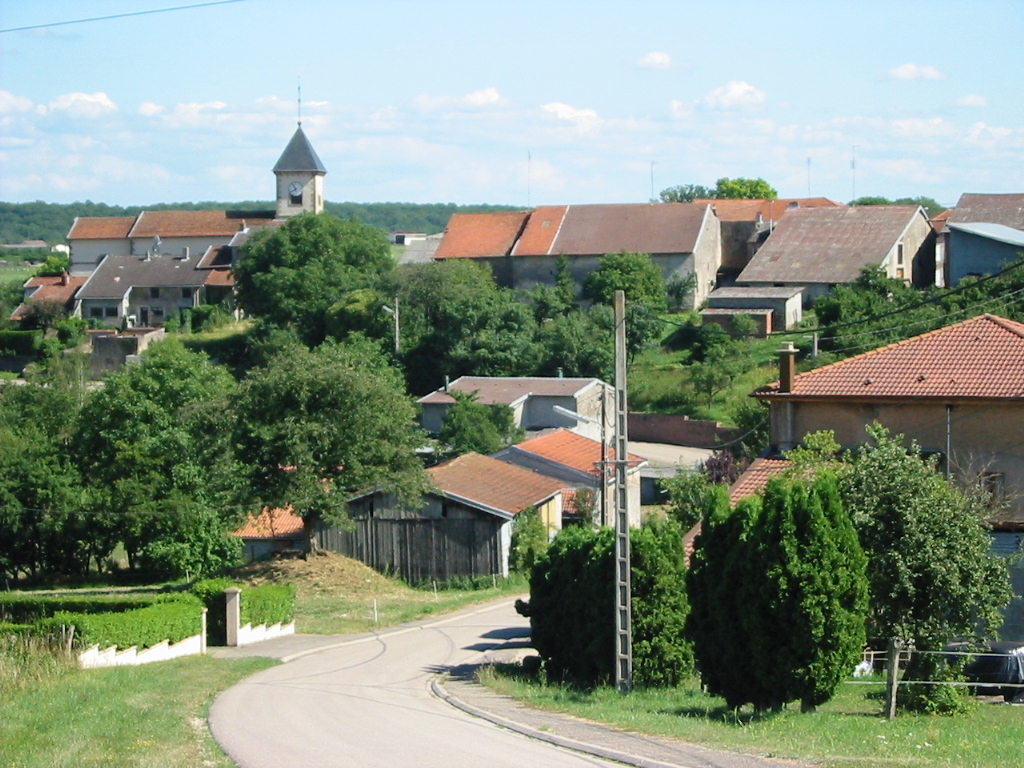
- A general view of Saint-Genest
- Location of Saint-Genest
- Location within France Location within Grand Est
- Coordinates: 48°21′19″N 6°31′31″E
- Country: France
- Region: Grand Est
- Department: Vosges
- Arrondissement: Épinal
- Canton: Charmes
- Intercommunality: CC Région de Rambervillers

Government
  - Mayor (2020–2026): Patrick Leroy
- Area^{1}: 6.26 km^{2} (2.42 sq mi)
- Elevation: 352 m (1,155 ft)
- Highest elevation: 367 m (1,204 ft)
- Lowest elevation: 296 m (971 ft)
- Population (2023): 131
  - Density: 20.9/km^{2} (54.2/sq mi)
- Time zone: UTC+01:00 (CET)
  - Summer (DST): UTC+02:00 (CEST)
- INSEE/Postal code: 88416 /88700
- ^{1} French Land Register data, which excludes lakes, ponds, glaciers > 1 km^{2} (0.386 sq mi or 247 acres) and river estuaries.

Saint-Genest is a commune in the Vosges department in Grand Est in northeastern France.

== See also ==
- Communes of the Vosges department
