= Clézentaine =

- Commune
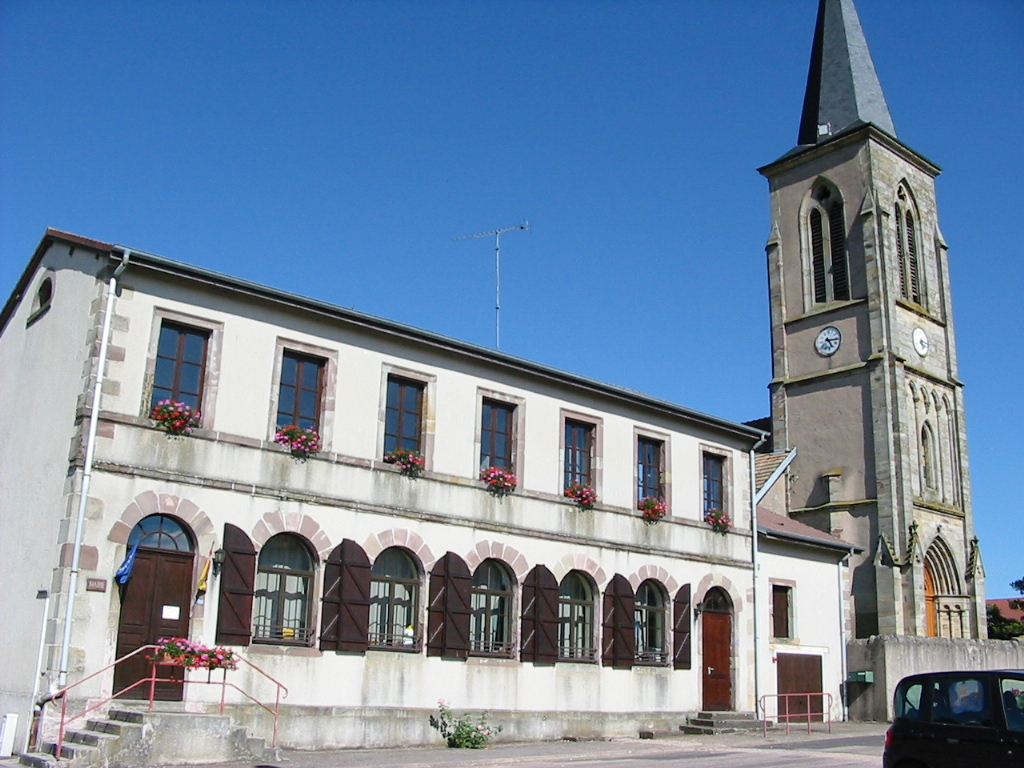
- The town hall, school and church in Clézentaine
- Location of Clézentaine
- Location within France Location within Grand Est
- Coordinates: 48°24′33″N 6°32′23″E
- Country: France
- Region: Grand Est
- Department: Vosges
- Arrondissement: Épinal
- Canton: Charmes
- Intercommunality: CC Région de Rambervillers

Government
  - Mayor (2020–2026): Christian Rochotte
- Area^{1}: 13.11 km^{2} (5.06 sq mi)
- Elevation: 274 m (899 ft)
- Highest elevation: 351 m (1,152 ft)
- Lowest elevation: 265 m (869 ft)
- Population (2023): 217
  - Density: 16.6/km^{2} (42.9/sq mi)
- Time zone: UTC+01:00 (CET)
  - Summer (DST): UTC+02:00 (CEST)
- INSEE/Postal code: 88110 /88700
- ^{1} French Land Register data, which excludes lakes, ponds, glaciers > 1 km^{2} (0.386 sq mi or 247 acres) and river estuaries.

Clézentaine (French pronunciation: [klezɑ̃tɛn]) is a commune in the Vosges department in Grand Est in northeastern France.

== See also ==
- Communes of the Vosges department
