= Saint-Benoît-la-Chipotte =

- Commune
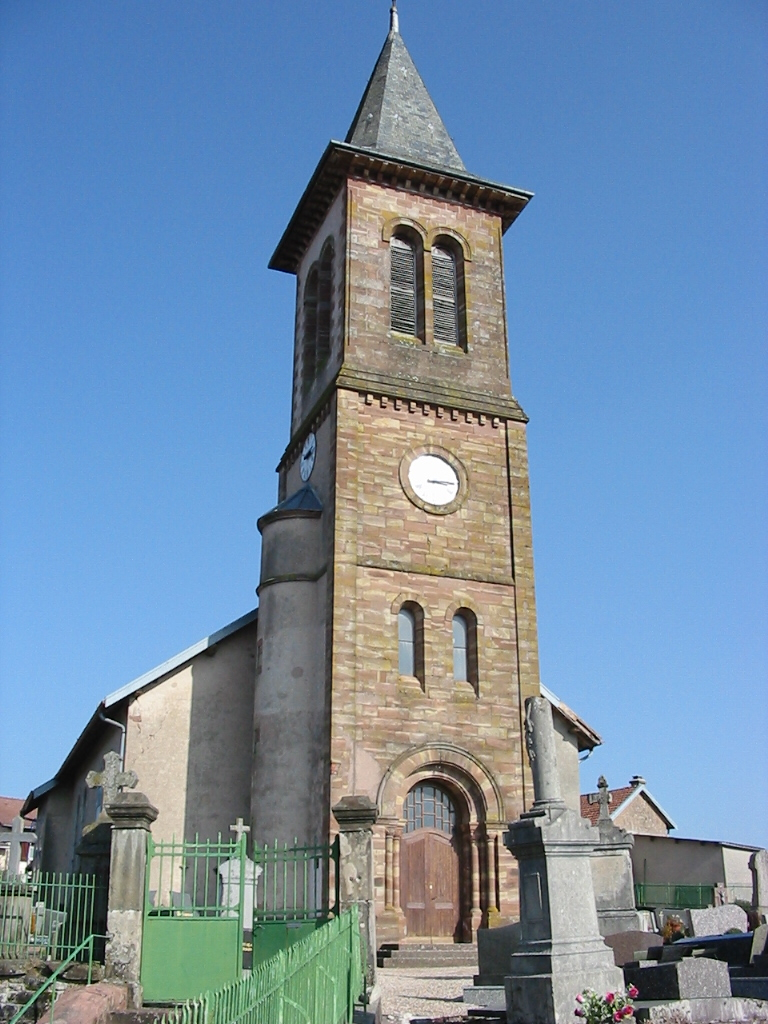
- The church in Saint-Benoît-la-Chipotte
- Location of Saint-Benoît-la-Chipotte
- Location within France Location within Grand Est
- Coordinates: 48°21′30″N 6°44′08″E
- Country: France
- Region: Grand Est
- Department: Vosges
- Arrondissement: Épinal
- Canton: Raon-l'Étape
- Intercommunality: CC Région de Rambervillers

Government
  - Mayor (2020–2026): Céline Tanneur
- Area^{1}: 20.77 km^{2} (8.02 sq mi)
- Elevation: 340 m (1,120 ft)
- Highest elevation: 524 m (1,719 ft)
- Lowest elevation: 324 m (1,063 ft)
- Population (2023): 442
  - Density: 21.3/km^{2} (55.1/sq mi)
- Time zone: UTC+01:00 (CET)
  - Summer (DST): UTC+02:00 (CEST)
- INSEE/Postal code: 88412 /88700
- ^{1} French Land Register data, which excludes lakes, ponds, glaciers > 1 km^{2} (0.386 sq mi or 247 acres) and river estuaries.

Saint-Benoît-la-Chipotte (French pronunciation: [sɛ̃ bənwa la ʃipɔt]) is a commune in the Vosges department in Grand Est in northeastern France.

== See also ==
- Communes of the Vosges department
