= Vomécourt =

- Commune
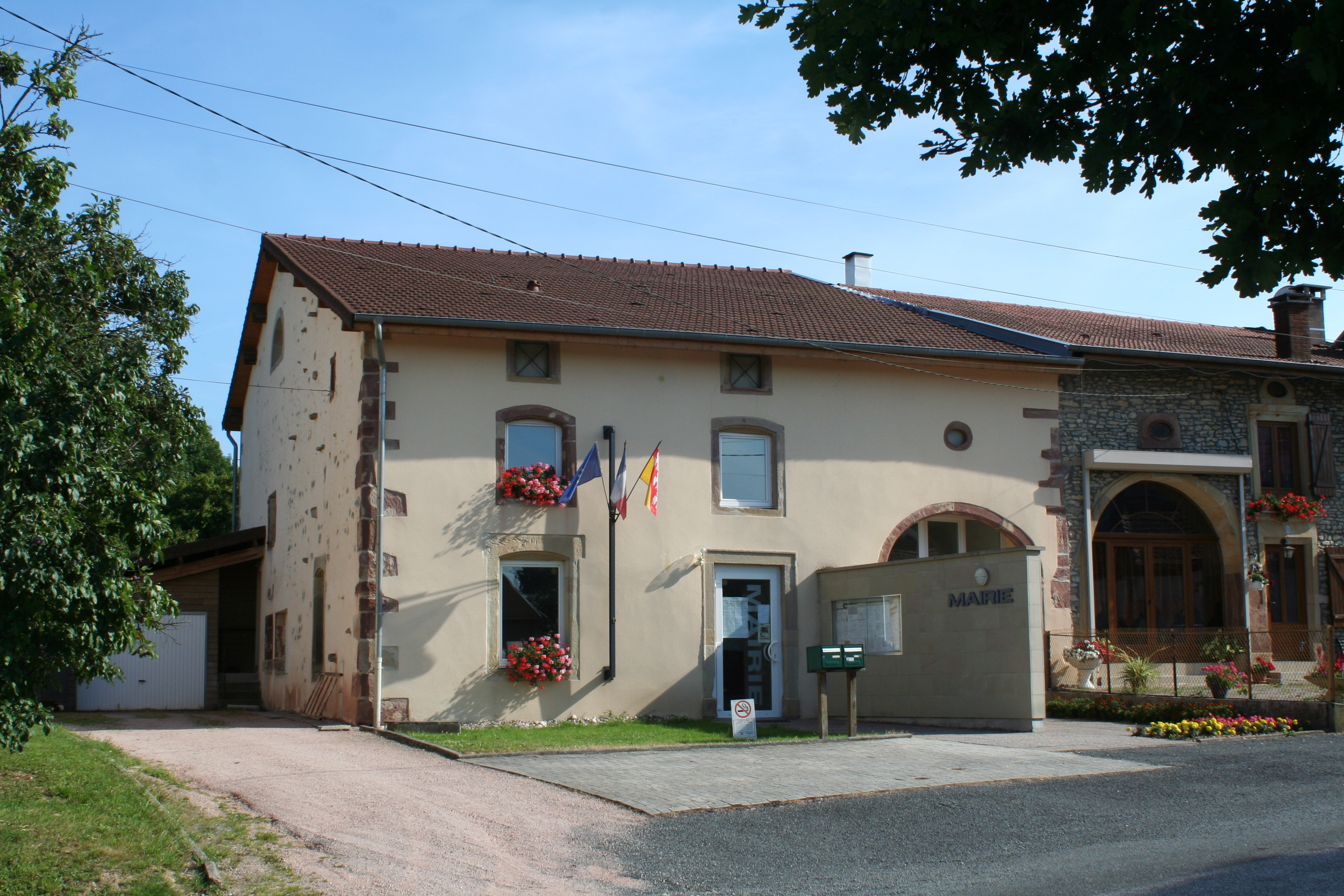
- The town hall in Vomécourt
- Location of Vomécourt
- Location within France Location within Grand Est
- Coordinates: 48°18′33″N 6°36′50″E
- Country: France
- Region: Grand Est
- Department: Vosges
- Arrondissement: Épinal
- Canton: Charmes
- Intercommunality: Région de Rambervillers

Government
  - Mayor (2020–2026): Bertrand Choley
- Area^{1}: 7.03 km^{2} (2.71 sq mi)
- Elevation: 317 m (1,040 ft)
- Highest elevation: 334 m (1,096 ft)
- Lowest elevation: 286 m (938 ft)
- Population (2023): 267
  - Density: 38.0/km^{2} (98.4/sq mi)
- Time zone: UTC+01:00 (CET)
  - Summer (DST): UTC+02:00 (CEST)
- INSEE/Postal code: 88521 /88700
- ^{1} French Land Register data, which excludes lakes, ponds, glaciers > 1 km^{2} (0.386 sq mi or 247 acres) and river estuaries.

Vomécourt (French pronunciation: [vɔmekuʁ]) is a commune in the Vosges department in Grand Est in northeastern France.

== See also ==
- Communes of the Vosges department
- Philippe de Vomécourt Special Operations Executive, (SOE) agent during World War II.
- Pierre de Vomécourt, Special Operations Executive (SOE) agent during World War II.
