= Autrey, Vosges =

Autrey
- Commune
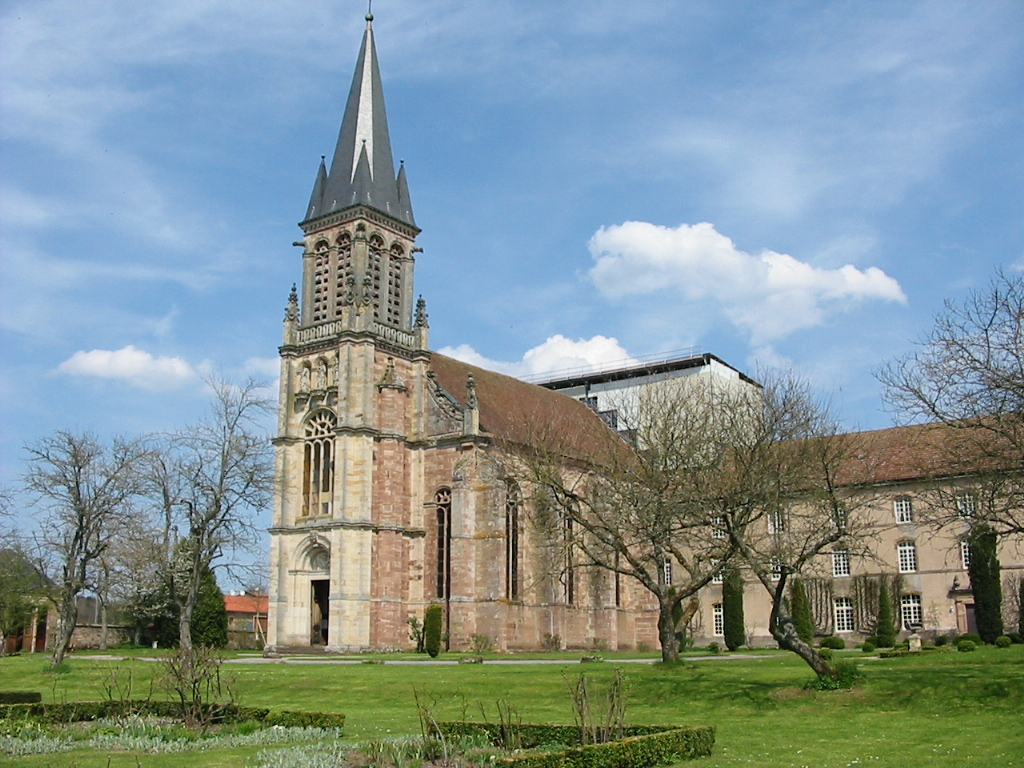
- The abbey and gardens in Autrey

- Coat of arms
- Location of Autrey
- Location within France Location within Grand Est
- Coordinates: 48°17′50″N 6°41′24″E
- Country: France
- Region: Grand Est
- Department: Vosges
- Arrondissement: Épinal
- Canton: Saint-Dié-des-Vosges-1
- Intercommunality: CC Région Rambervillers

Government
  - Mayor (2020–2026): Jacques Colne
- Area^{1}: 17.42 km^{2} (6.73 sq mi)
- Elevation: 320 m (1,050 ft)
- Highest elevation: 535 m (1,755 ft)
- Lowest elevation: 306 m (1,004 ft)
- Population (2023): 273
  - Density: 15.7/km^{2} (40.6/sq mi)
- Time zone: UTC+01:00 (CET)
  - Summer (DST): UTC+02:00 (CEST)
- INSEE/Postal code: 88021 /88700
- ^{1} French Land Register data, which excludes lakes, ponds, glaciers > 1 km^{2} (0.386 sq mi or 247 acres) and river estuaries.

Autrey (French pronunciation: [otʁɛ]) is a commune in the Vosges department in Grand Est in northeastern France.

== Geography ==
The village lies in the north-western part of the commune, on the right bank of the Mortagne, which forms all of the commune's western and south-western borders.

== Points of interest ==
- Jardin botanique de Gondremer

== See also ==
- Communes of the Vosges department
