= Brû =

- Commune
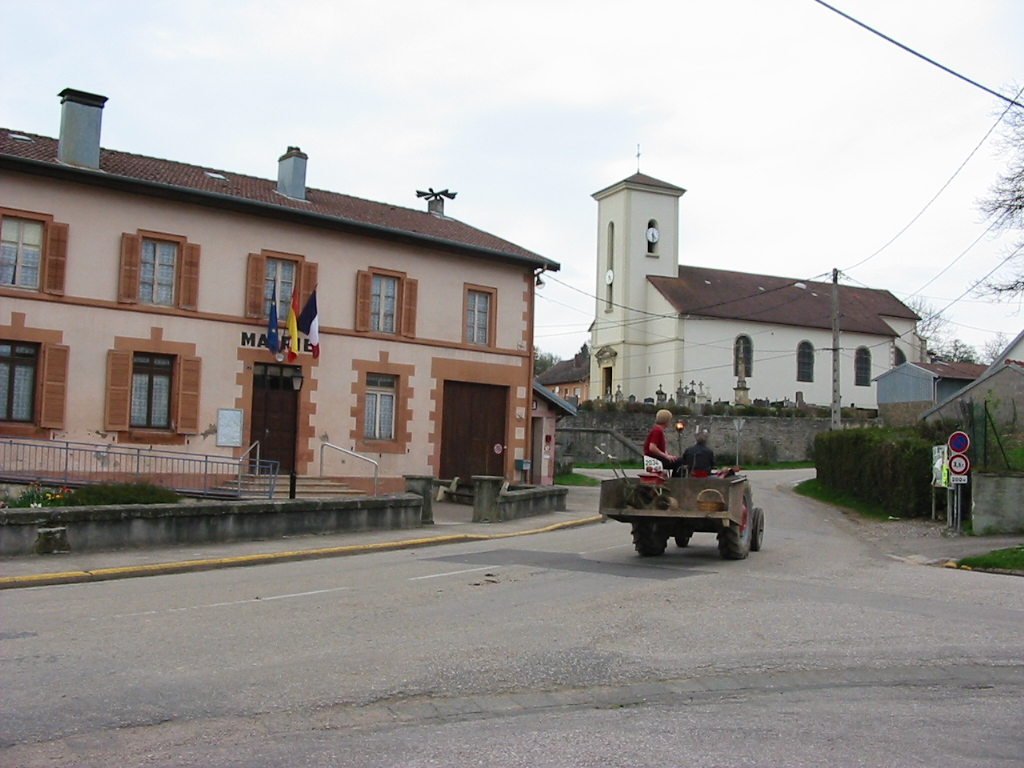
- Town hall and the church

- Coat of arms
- Location of Brû
- Location within France Location within Grand Est
- Coordinates: 48°20′55″N 6°41′02″E
- Country: France
- Region: Grand Est
- Department: Vosges
- Arrondissement: Épinal
- Canton: Raon-l'Étape
- Intercommunality: CC Région de Rambervillers

Government
  - Mayor (2020–2026): Patrice Robin
- Area^{1}: 8.95 km^{2} (3.46 sq mi)
- Elevation: 311 m (1,020 ft)
- Highest elevation: 391 m (1,283 ft)
- Lowest elevation: 295 m (968 ft)
- Population (2023): 567
  - Density: 63.4/km^{2} (164/sq mi)
- Time zone: UTC+01:00 (CET)
  - Summer (DST): UTC+02:00 (CEST)
- INSEE/Postal code: 88077 /88700
- ^{1} French Land Register data, which excludes lakes, ponds, glaciers > 1 km^{2} (0.386 sq mi or 247 acres) and river estuaries.

Brû (French pronunciation: [bʁy]) is a commune in the Vosges department in Grand Est in northeastern France.

== See also ==
- Communes of the Vosges department
