= Deinvillers =

- Commune
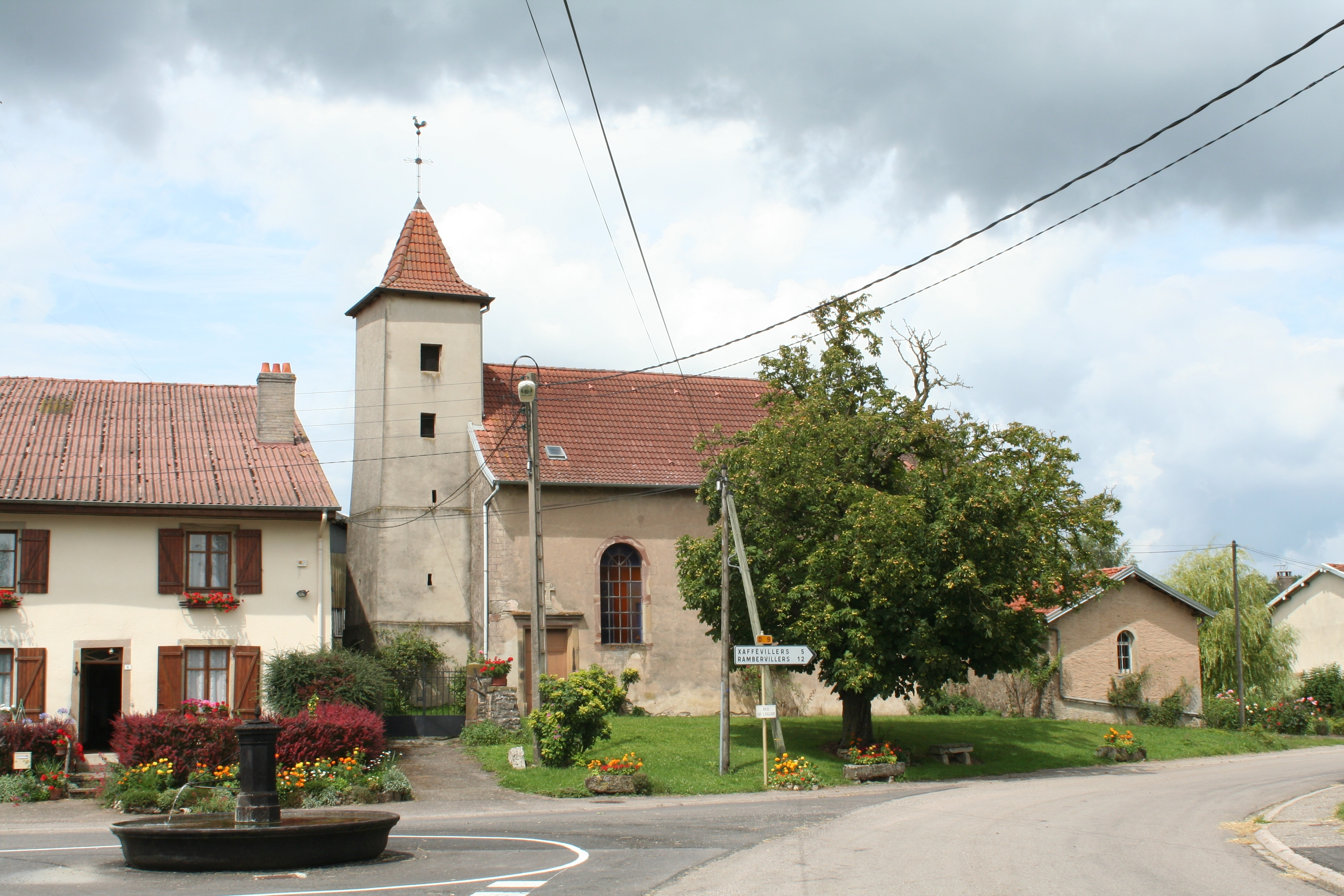
- The church in Deinvillers
- Location of Deinvillers
- Location within France Location within Grand Est
- Coordinates: 48°24′47″N 6°33′29″E
- Country: France
- Region: Grand Est
- Department: Vosges
- Arrondissement: Épinal
- Canton: Charmes
- Intercommunality: CC Région de Rambervillers

Government
  - Mayor (2020–2026): Lucette Michel
- Area^{1}: 5.6 km^{2} (2.2 sq mi)
- Elevation: 262 m (860 ft)
- Highest elevation: 305 m (1,001 ft)
- Lowest elevation: 253 m (830 ft)
- Population (2023): 57
  - Density: 10/km^{2} (26/sq mi)
- Time zone: UTC+01:00 (CET)
  - Summer (DST): UTC+02:00 (CEST)
- INSEE/Postal code: 88127 /88700
- ^{1} French Land Register data, which excludes lakes, ponds, glaciers > 1 km^{2} (0.386 sq mi or 247 acres) and river estuaries.

Deinvillers is a commune in the Vosges department in Grand Est in northeastern France.

== Geography ==
The river Mortagne forms all of the commune's northeastern border.

== See also ==
- Communes of the Vosges department
