= Saint-Pierremont, Vosges =

Saint-Pierremont
- Commune
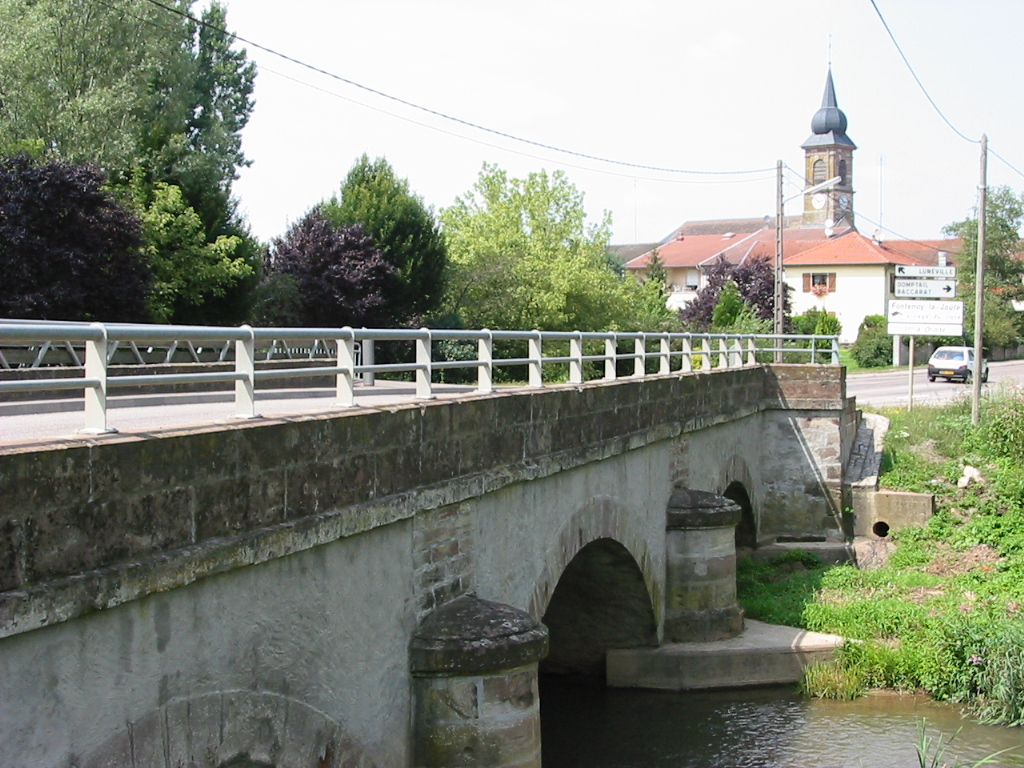
- Bridge over the Belvitte
- Location of Saint-Pierremont
- Location within France Location within Grand Est
- Coordinates: 48°26′19″N 6°34′38″E
- Country: France
- Region: Grand Est
- Department: Vosges
- Arrondissement: Épinal
- Canton: Raon-l'Étape
- Intercommunality: CC Région de Rambervillers

Government
  - Mayor (2020–2026): Frédéric Vialet-Chabrand
- Area^{1}: 5.51 km^{2} (2.13 sq mi)
- Elevation: 260 m (850 ft)
- Highest elevation: 340 m (1,120 ft)
- Lowest elevation: 249 m (817 ft)
- Population (2023): 153
  - Density: 27.8/km^{2} (71.9/sq mi)
- Time zone: UTC+01:00 (CET)
  - Summer (DST): UTC+02:00 (CEST)
- INSEE/Postal code: 88432 /88700
- ^{1} French Land Register data, which excludes lakes, ponds, glaciers > 1 km^{2} (0.386 sq mi or 247 acres) and river estuaries.

Saint-Pierremont (French pronunciation: [sɛ̃ pjɛʁmɔ̃]) is a commune in the Vosges department in Grand Est in northeastern France.

== See also ==
- Communes of the Vosges department
