= Doncières =

- Commune
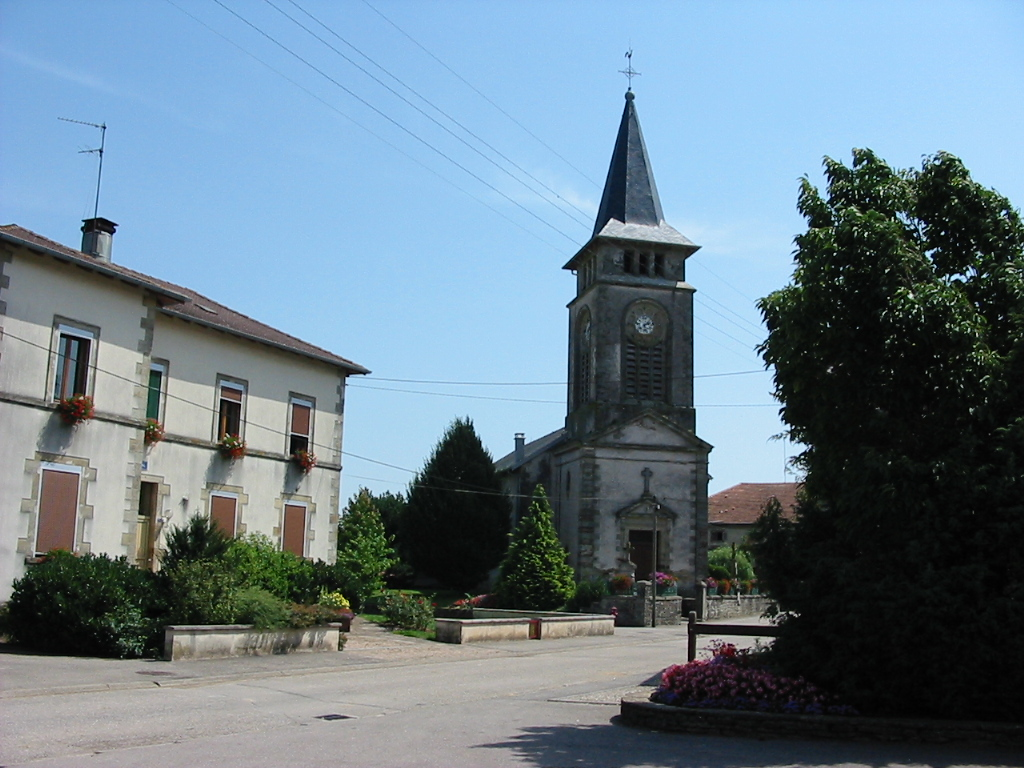
- Town hall and church
- Location of Doncières
- Location within France Location within Grand Est
- Coordinates: 48°23′41″N 6°38′12″E
- Country: France
- Region: Grand Est
- Department: Vosges
- Arrondissement: Épinal
- Canton: Raon-l'Étape
- Intercommunality: CC Région de Rambervillers

Government
  - Mayor (2020–2026): Xavier Richard
- Area^{1}: 7.63 km^{2} (2.95 sq mi)
- Highest elevation: 314 m (1,030 ft)
- Lowest elevation: 264 m (866 ft)
- Population (2023): 157
  - Density: 20.6/km^{2} (53.3/sq mi)
- Time zone: UTC+01:00 (CET)
  - Summer (DST): UTC+02:00 (CEST)
- INSEE/Postal code: 88156 /88700
- ^{1} French Land Register data, which excludes lakes, ponds, glaciers > 1 km^{2} (0.386 sq mi or 247 acres) and river estuaries.

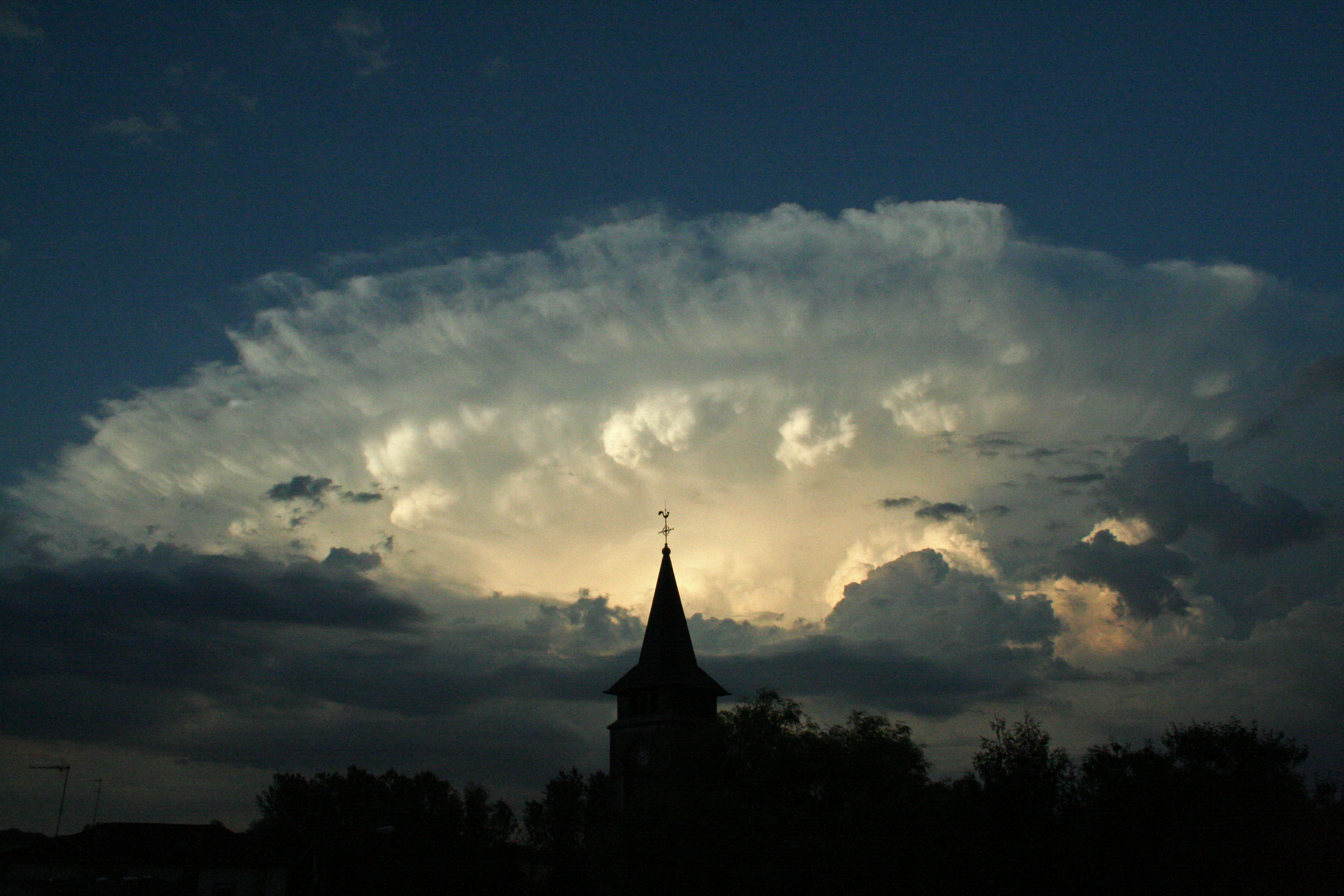
Church

Doncières (French pronunciation: [dɔ̃sjɛʁ]) is a commune in the Vosges department in Grand Est in northeastern France.

== See also ==
- Communes of the Vosges department
