= Sainte-Barbe, Vosges =

Sainte-Barbe
- Commune
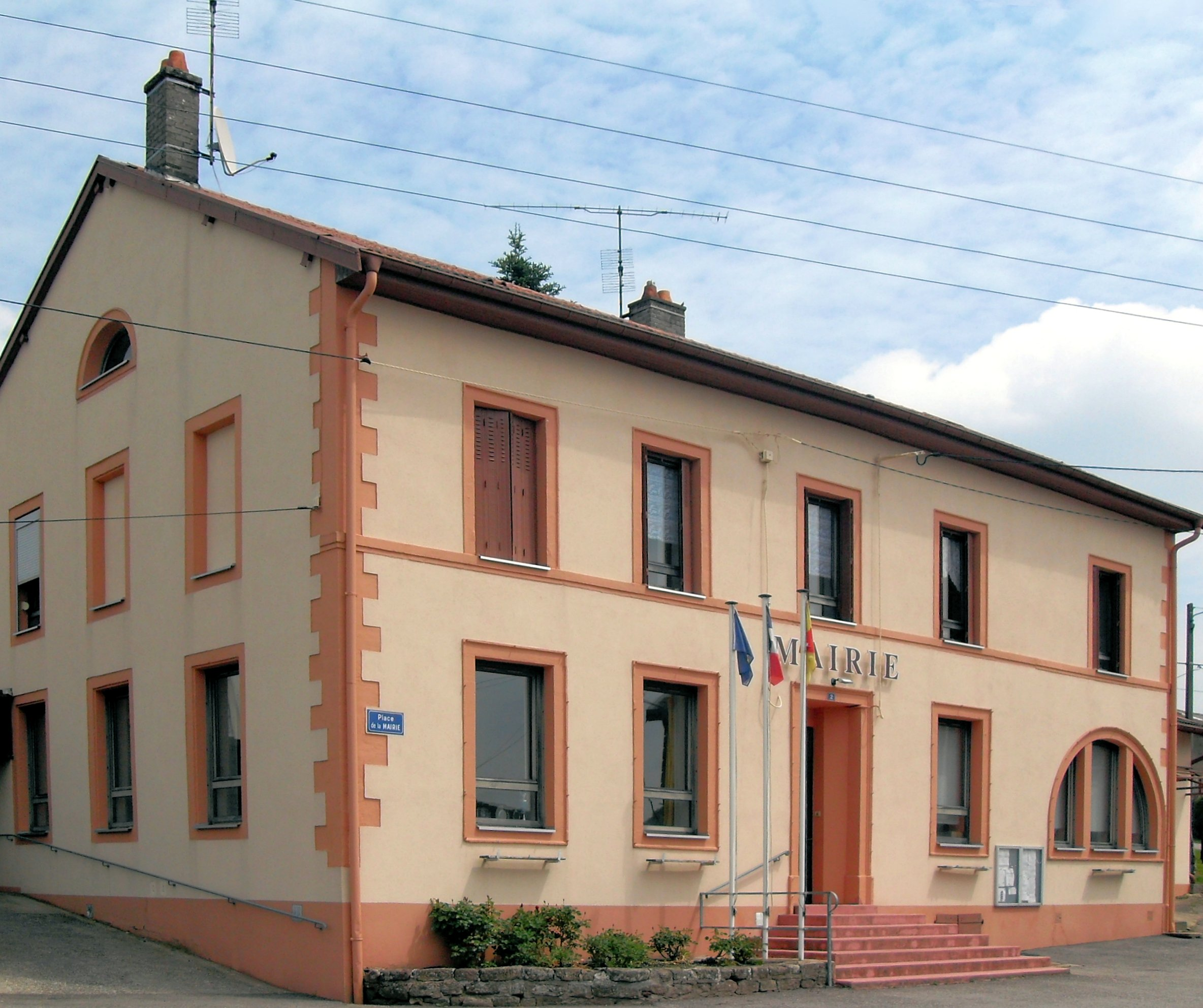
- The town hall in Sainte-Barbe

- Coat of arms
- Location of Sainte-Barbe
- Location within France Location within Grand Est
- Coordinates: 48°23′50″N 6°43′24″E
- Country: France
- Region: Grand Est
- Department: Vosges
- Arrondissement: Épinal
- Canton: Raon-l'Étape
- Intercommunality: CC Région de Rambervillers

Government
  - Mayor (2020–2026): Christophe Lemesle
- Area^{1}: 30.38 km^{2} (11.73 sq mi)
- Elevation: 360 m (1,180 ft)
- Highest elevation: 476 m (1,562 ft)
- Lowest elevation: 286 m (938 ft)
- Population (2023): 267
  - Density: 8.79/km^{2} (22.8/sq mi)
- Time zone: UTC+01:00 (CET)
  - Summer (DST): UTC+02:00 (CEST)
- INSEE/Postal code: 88410 /88700
- ^{1} French Land Register data, which excludes lakes, ponds, glaciers > 1 km^{2} (0.386 sq mi or 247 acres) and river estuaries.

Sainte-Barbe (French pronunciation: [sɛ̃t baʁb]) is a commune in the Vosges department in Grand Est in northeastern France.

== See also ==
- Communes of the Vosges department
