= Anglemont =

- Commune
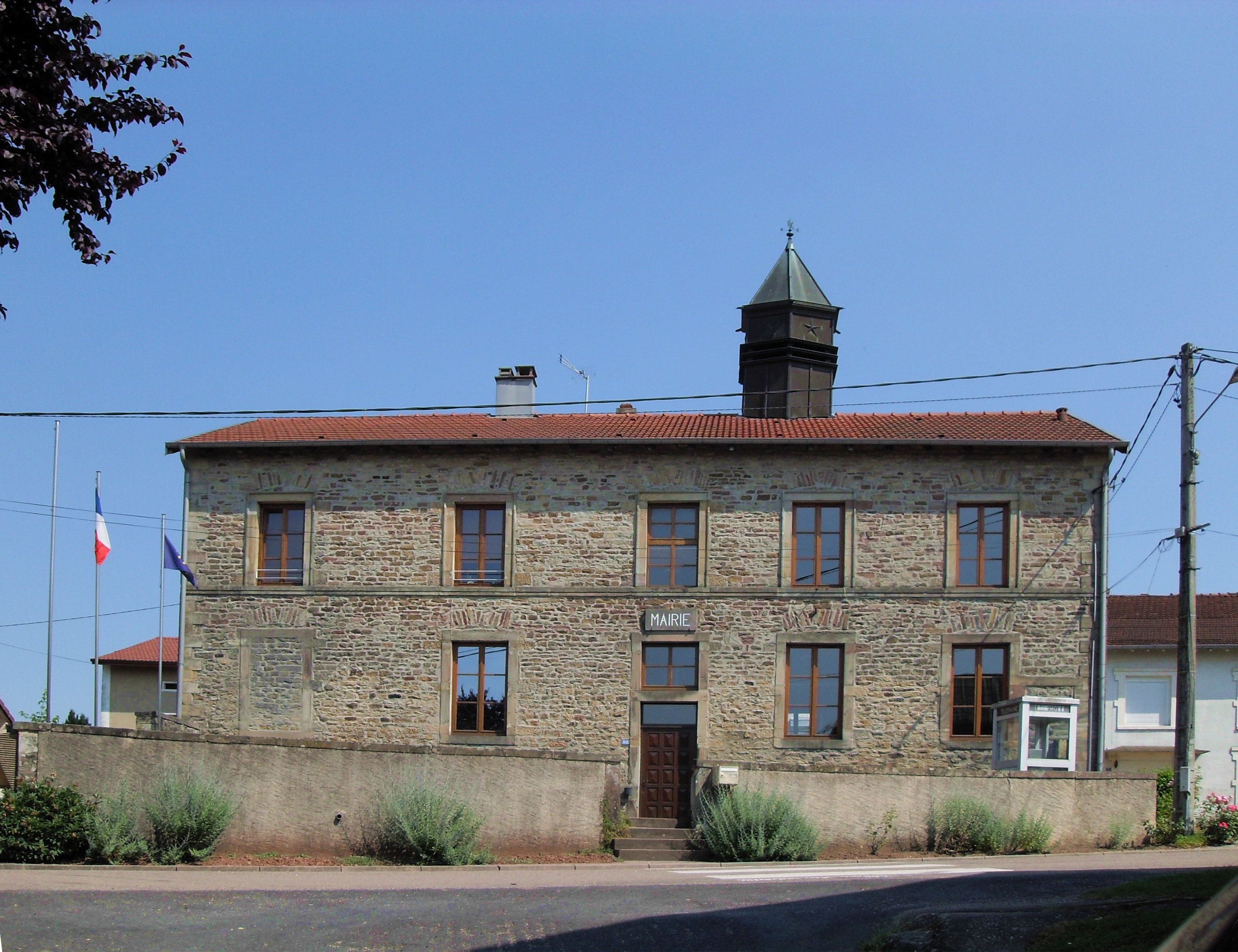
- The town hall in Anglemont
- Location of Anglemont
- Location within France Location within Grand Est
- Coordinates: 48°22′51″N 6°40′10″E
- Country: France
- Region: Grand Est
- Department: Vosges
- Arrondissement: Épinal
- Canton: Raon-l'Étape
- Intercommunality: CC Région de Rambervillers

Government
  - Mayor (2020–2026): Philippe Thomas
- Area^{1}: 5.93 km^{2} (2.29 sq mi)
- Elevation: 285 m (935 ft)
- Highest elevation: 363 m (1,191 ft)
- Lowest elevation: 269 m (883 ft)
- Population (2023): 144
  - Density: 24.3/km^{2} (62.9/sq mi)
- Time zone: UTC+01:00 (CET)
  - Summer (DST): UTC+02:00 (CEST)
- INSEE/Postal code: 88008 /88700
- ^{1} French Land Register data, which excludes lakes, ponds, glaciers > 1 km^{2} (0.386 sq mi or 247 acres) and river estuaries.

Anglemont (French pronunciation: [ɑ̃ɡləmɔ̃]; German: Engleberg) is a commune in the Vosges department in Grand Est in northeastern France.

== See also ==
- Communes of the Vosges department
