= Romont, Vosges =

Romont
- Commune
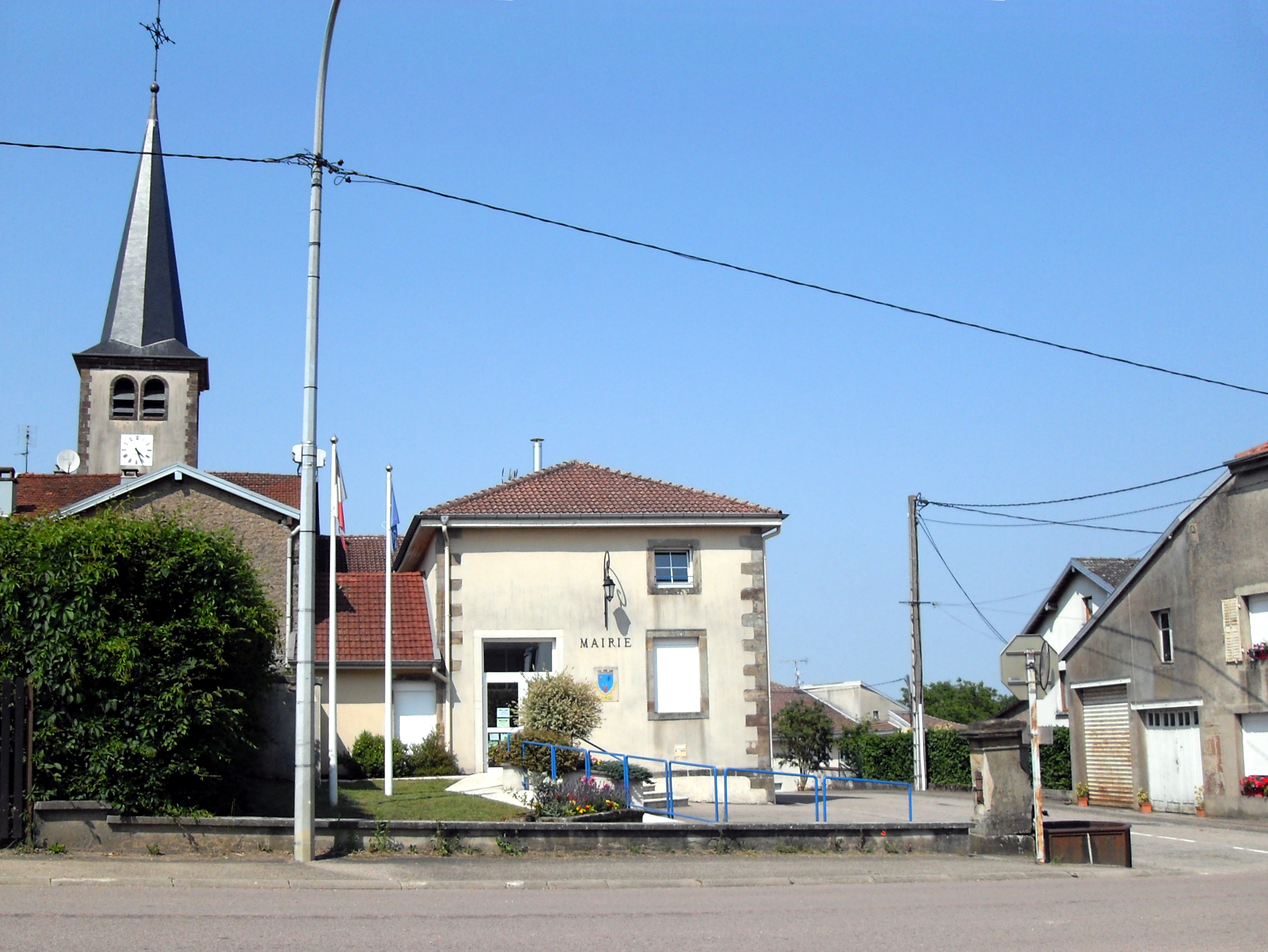
- The town hall in Romont

- Coat of arms
- Location of Romont
- Location within France Location within Grand Est
- Coordinates: 48°21′27″N 6°35′12″E
- Country: France
- Region: Grand Est
- Department: Vosges
- Arrondissement: Épinal
- Canton: Charmes
- Intercommunality: CC Région de Rambervillers

Government
  - Mayor (2023–2026): Bertrand Grandidier
- Area^{1}: 19.26 km^{2} (7.44 sq mi)
- Highest elevation: 346 m (1,135 ft)
- Lowest elevation: 265 m (869 ft)
- Population (2023): 358
  - Density: 18.6/km^{2} (48.1/sq mi)
- Time zone: UTC+01:00 (CET)
  - Summer (DST): UTC+02:00 (CEST)
- INSEE/Postal code: 88395 /88700
- ^{1} French Land Register data, which excludes lakes, ponds, glaciers > 1 km^{2} (0.386 sq mi or 247 acres) and river estuaries.

Romont (French pronunciation: [ʁɔmɔ̃]) is a commune in the Vosges department in Grand Est in northeastern France.

== See also ==
- Communes of the Vosges department
