= Fauconcourt =

- Commune
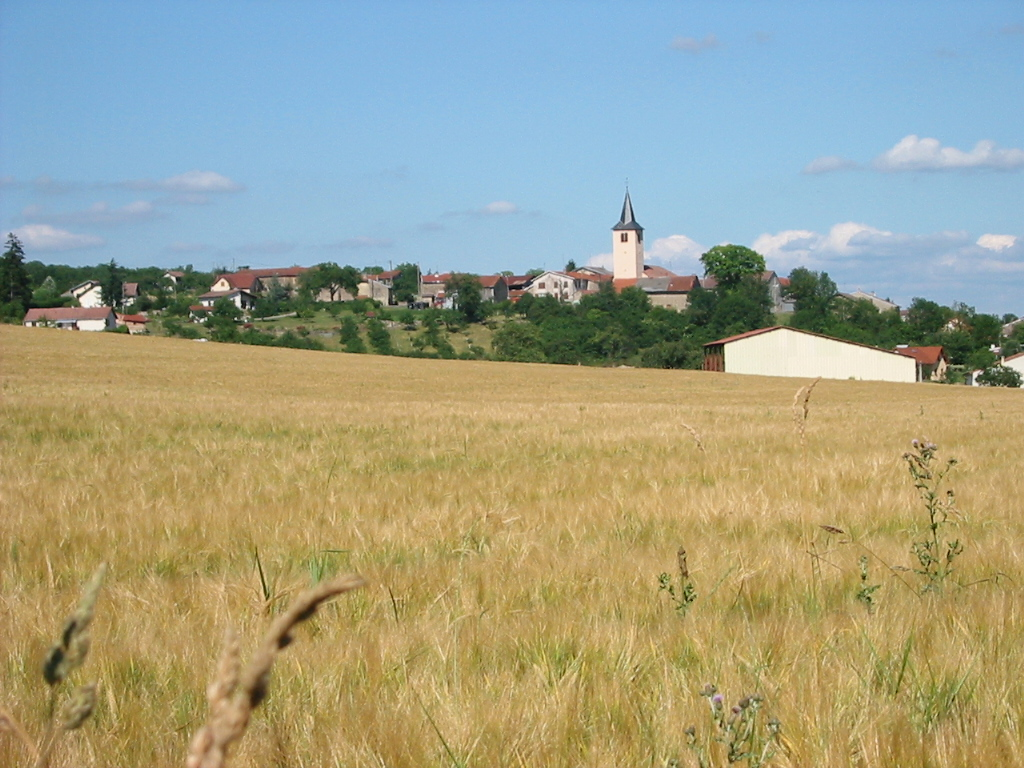
- A general view of Fauconcourt
- Location of Fauconcourt
- Location within France Location within Grand Est
- Coordinates: 48°22′24″N 6°32′29″E
- Country: France
- Region: Grand Est
- Department: Vosges
- Arrondissement: Épinal
- Canton: Charmes
- Intercommunality: CC Région de Rambervillers

Government
  - Mayor (2020–2026): Stéphane Simonin
- Area^{1}: 4.9 km^{2} (1.9 sq mi)
- Elevation: 340 m (1,120 ft)
- Highest elevation: 358 m (1,175 ft)
- Lowest elevation: 274 m (899 ft)
- Population (2023): 126
  - Density: 26/km^{2} (67/sq mi)
- Time zone: UTC+01:00 (CET)
  - Summer (DST): UTC+02:00 (CEST)
- INSEE/Postal code: 88168 /88700
- ^{1} French Land Register data, which excludes lakes, ponds, glaciers > 1 km^{2} (0.386 sq mi or 247 acres) and river estuaries.

Fauconcourt (French pronunciation: [fokɔ̃kuʁ]) is a commune in the Vosges department in Grand Est in northeastern France.

== See also ==
- Communes of the Vosges department
