= Xaffévillers =

- Commune
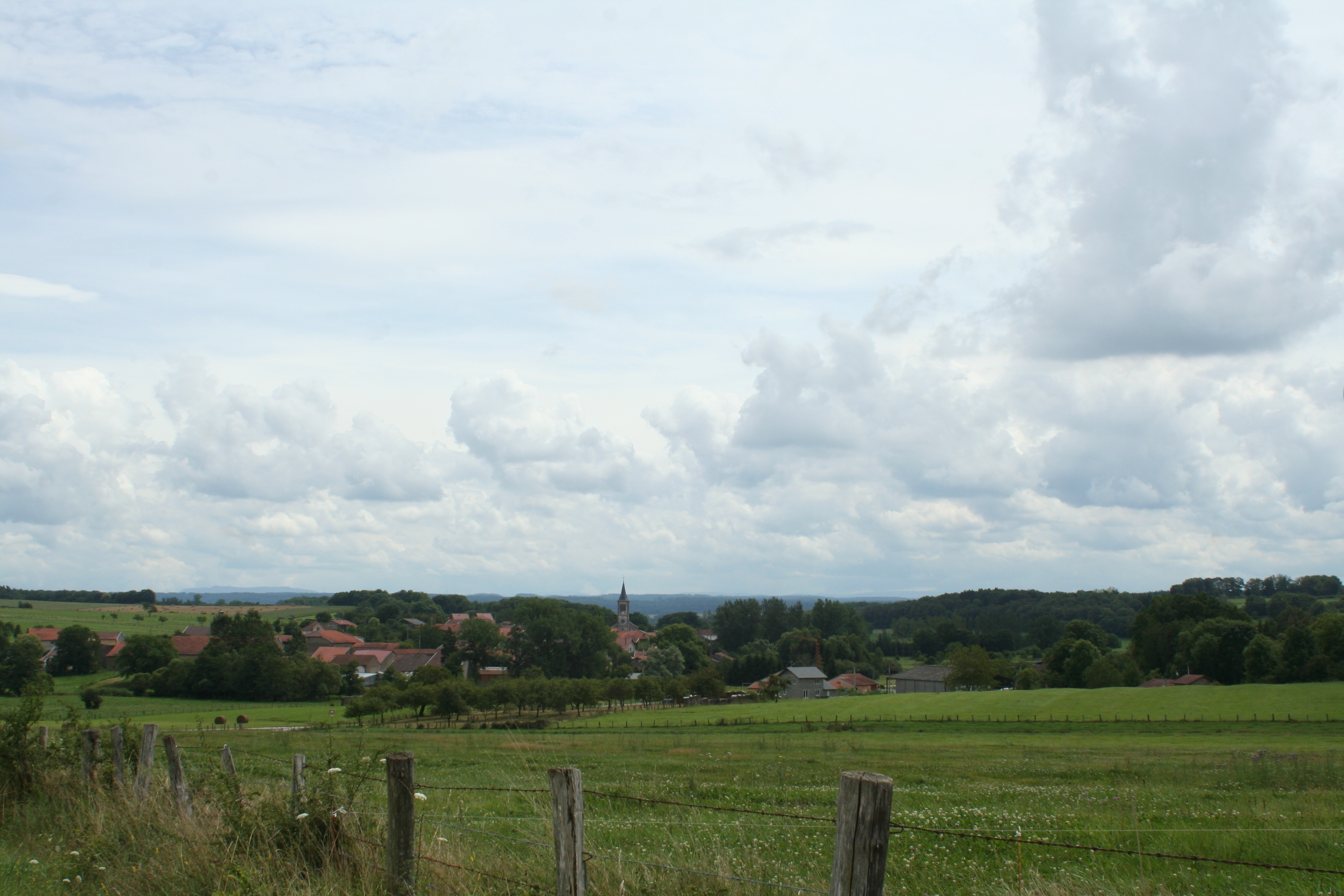
- A general view of Xaffévillers
- Location of Xaffévillers
- Location within France Location within Grand Est
- Coordinates: 48°24′36″N 6°36′44″E
- Country: France
- Region: Grand Est
- Department: Vosges
- Arrondissement: Épinal
- Canton: Raon-l'Étape
- Intercommunality: Région de Rambervillers

Government
  - Mayor (2020–2026): Jean-Paul Hausermann
- Area^{1}: 8.43 km^{2} (3.25 sq mi)
- Elevation: 260 m (850 ft)
- Highest elevation: 321 m (1,053 ft)
- Lowest elevation: 256 m (840 ft)
- Population (2023): 131
  - Density: 15.5/km^{2} (40.2/sq mi)
- Time zone: UTC+01:00 (CET)
  - Summer (DST): UTC+02:00 (CEST)
- INSEE/Postal code: 88527 /88700
- ^{1} French Land Register data, which excludes lakes, ponds, glaciers > 1 km^{2} (0.386 sq mi or 247 acres) and river estuaries.

Xaffévillers (French pronunciation: [ksafevilɛʁ]) is a commune in the Vosges department in Grand Est in northeastern France.

== Geography ==
The village lies in the middle of the commune, on the right bank of the Belvitte, a tributary of the Mortagne, which forms most of the commune's western border.

== Population ==
Historical population
Year	Pop.	±% p.a.
1968	166	—
1975	130	−3.43%
1982	134	+0.43%
1990	145	+0.99%
1999	155	+0.74%
2007	141	−1.18%
2012	171	+3.93%
2017	153	−2.20%
2023	131	−2.55%
Source: INSEE

== See also ==
- Communes of the Vosges department
