= Bazien =

- Commune
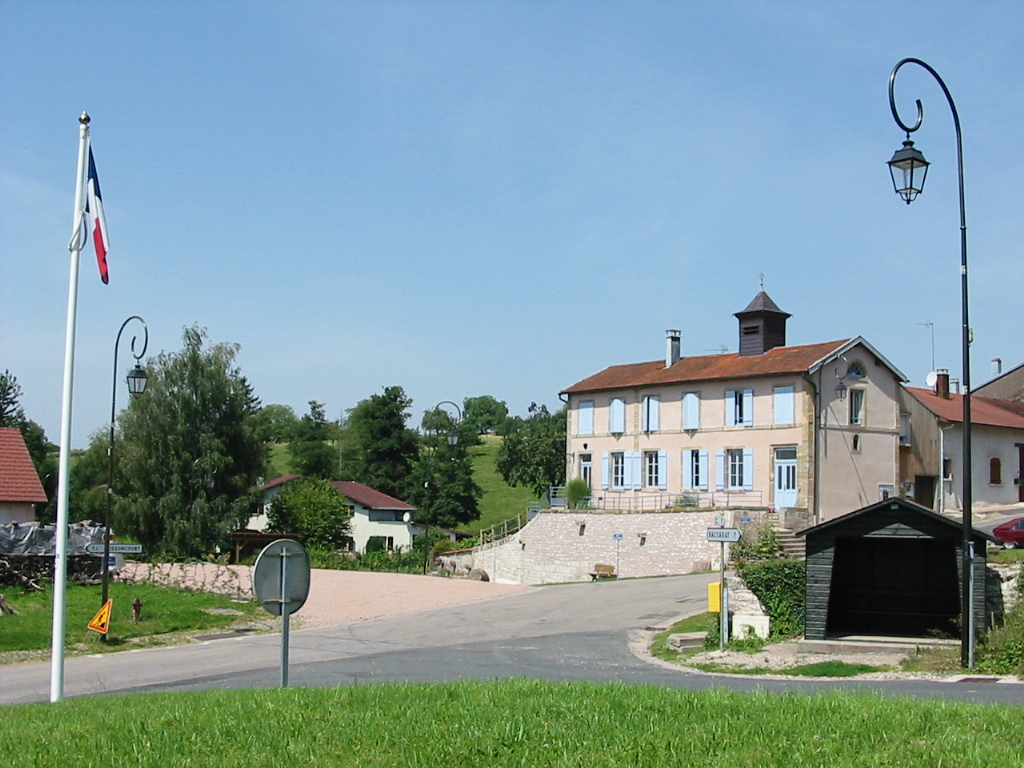
- Town hall
- Location of Bazien
- Location within France Location within Grand Est
- Coordinates: 48°24′43″N 6°40′40″E
- Country: France
- Region: Grand Est
- Department: Vosges
- Arrondissement: Épinal
- Canton: Raon-l'Étape
- Intercommunality: CC Région de Rambervillers

Government
  - Mayor (2020–2026): Michel Toussaint
- Area^{1}: 3.21 km^{2} (1.24 sq mi)
- Elevation: 350 m (1,150 ft)
- Highest elevation: 371 m (1,217 ft)
- Lowest elevation: 283 m (928 ft)
- Population (2023): 79
  - Density: 25/km^{2} (64/sq mi)
- Time zone: UTC+01:00 (CET)
  - Summer (DST): UTC+02:00 (CEST)
- INSEE/Postal code: 88042 /88700
- ^{1} French Land Register data, which excludes lakes, ponds, glaciers > 1 km^{2} (0.386 sq mi or 247 acres) and river estuaries.

Bazien (French pronunciation: [bazjɛ̃]) is a commune in the Vosges department in Grand Est in northeastern France.

== See also ==
- Communes of the Vosges department
