= Rambervillers =

- Commune
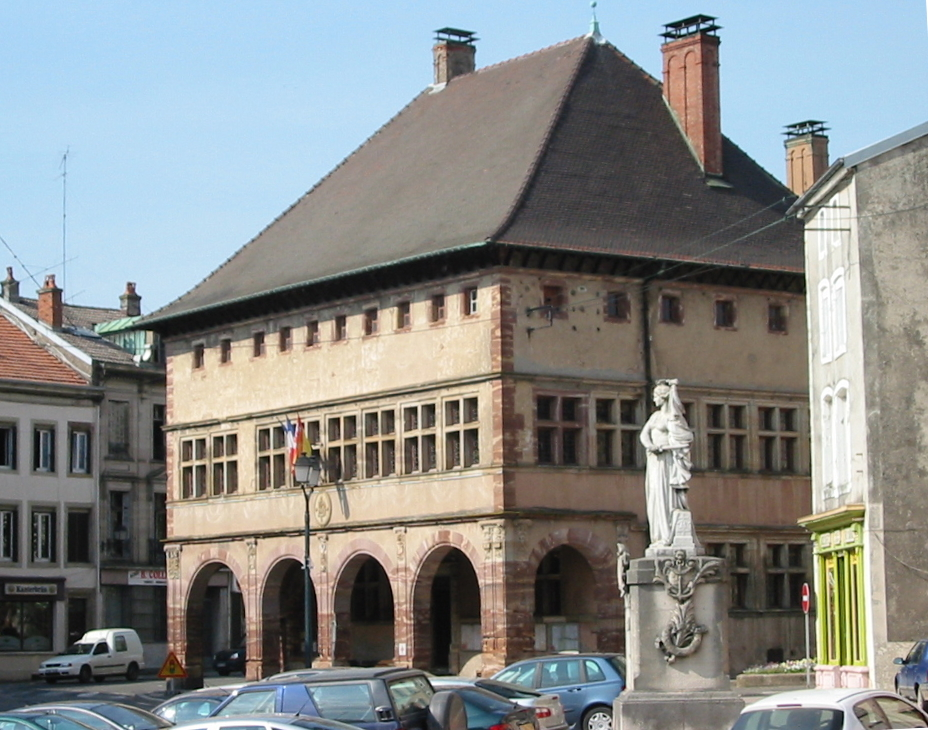
- Town hall

- Coat of arms
- Location of Rambervillers
- Location within France Location within Grand Est
- Coordinates: 48°20′48″N 6°38′08″E
- Country: France
- Region: Grand Est
- Department: Vosges
- Arrondissement: Épinal
- Canton: Saint-Dié-des-Vosges-1
- Intercommunality: CC Région de Rambervillers

Government
  - Mayor (2024–2026): Claude Bourdon
- Area^{1}: 20.64 km^{2} (7.97 sq mi)
- Elevation: 287 m (942 ft)
- Highest elevation: 348 m (1,142 ft)
- Lowest elevation: 272 m (892 ft)
- Population (2023): 5,018
  - Density: 243.1/km^{2} (629.7/sq mi)
- Time zone: UTC+01:00 (CET)
  - Summer (DST): UTC+02:00 (CEST)
- INSEE/Postal code: 88367 /88700
- ^{1} French Land Register data, which excludes lakes, ponds, glaciers > 1 km^{2} (0.386 sq mi or 247 acres) and river estuaries.

Rambervillers (French pronunciation: [ʁɑ̃bɛʁvile]) is a commune in the Vosges department in Grand Est in northeastern France.

== Geography ==
The town is built on the banks of the Mortagne, some 28 kilometres (17 mi) to the west of Saint-Dié and 22 kilometres (14 mi) to the north-east of Épinal.

The river flows from Haut Jacques and the forests to the south-east of the town; where it passes through Rambervillers it has been channeled, but the work was done without sufficient planning for the volume of water unleashed in stormy weather, which gives rise to flooding. Notably, during 2006 the town centre was under two meters of water after an outbreak of torrential rain.

== History ==
Rambervillers was the creation in the ninth century of a man called Rambert, who was the Count of Mortagne, or the Abbot of Senones: sources differ.

Through the later medieval period, Rambervillers belonged to the Bishops of Metz. The care taken with its maintenance and fortification indicate that it was an important regional commercial centre. In the twelfth century the Bishop of Metz, Étienne of Bar protected the town with wooden fortifications and ditches: in the thirteenth century another Bishop of Metz, Jacques of Lorraine, replaced the stone fortifications with a stone wall backed up with 24 large towers.

Despite its fortifications, Rambervillers found itself torched by a Huguenot army acting on the orders of the Baron of Bollweiler, in the sixteenth century. Recovery seems to have been relatively rapid, however, since in 1581 the leading citizens resolved to construct the Town Hall.

In 1718 the town was integrated into the Duchy of Lorraine, becoming formally part of France on the death of the last Duke in 1766.

On 9 October 1870, manning the fortifications against the invading Prussians, 200 national guardsmen held out for a day against 2,000 Germans. Their courage won the town the Légion d'honneur medal, and had a street in Paris (in the 12th arrondissement) named after it.

== Population ==
Inhabitants are called Rambuvetais in French.

Historical population
Year	Pop.	±% p.a.
1968	7,229	—
1975	7,113	−0.23%
1982	6,595	−1.07%
1990	5,919	−1.34%
1999	5,999	+0.15%
2007	5,669	−0.70%
2012	5,511	−0.56%
2017	5,170	−1.27%
2023	5,018	−0.50%
Source: INSEE

== Personalities ==
- Jean Joseph Vaudechamp 1790 - 1866, portraitist, was born at Rambervillers.
- Nicolaus Serarius 1555 - 1609, scholar and theologian, was born at Rambervillers.
- André Pernet 1894 - 1966, operatic bass, was born at Rambervillers.

== See also ==
- Communes of the Vosges department
