= Canton of Châtel-sur-Moselle =

Coordinates: 48°17′35″N 6°26′07″E

Châtel-sur-Moselle
- Former canton
- Interactive map of Châtel-sur-Moselle
- Country: France
- Region: Grand Est
- Department: Vosges
- No. of communes: {{{nbcomm}}}
- Disbanded: 2015
- Area: 247.9 km^{2} (95.7 sq mi)
- Population (2012): 19,871
  - Density: 80.16/km^{2} (207.6/sq mi)

The Canton of Châtel-sur-Moselle is a French former administrative and electoral grouping of communes in the Vosges département of eastern France and in the region of Lorraine. It covered an area directly to the north-west of Épinal. It was disbanded following the French canton reorganisation which came into effect in March 2015. It had 19,871 inhabitants (2012).

One of 13 cantons in the Arrondissement of Épinal, the Canton of Châtel-sur-Moselle had its administrative centre at Châtel-sur-Moselle.

== Composition ==
The Canton of Châtel-sur-Moselle comprised the following 23 communes:

- Badménil-aux-Bois
- Bayecourt
- Châtel-sur-Moselle
- Chavelot
- Damas-aux-Bois
- Domèvre-sur-Durbion
- Frizon
- Gigney
- Girmont
- Hadigny-les-Verrières
- Haillainville
- Igney
- Mazeley
- Moriville
- Nomexy
- Oncourt
- Pallegney
- Rehaincourt
- Sercœur
- Thaon-les-Vosges
- Vaxoncourt
- Villoncourt
- Zincourt
