= Communauté de communes CAPAVENIR =

Former communauté de communes in Vosges, France

CAPAVENIR
- Former communauté de communes
- Country: France
- Region: Lorraine
- Department: Vosges
- No. of communes: {{{nbcomm}}}
- Established: 1 January 2005
- Disbanded: 31 December 2012
- Area: 69.71 km^{2} (26.92 sq mi)

The Communauté de communes CAPAVENIR is a French former administrative association of communes in the Vosges département of eastern France and in the region of Lorraine. It was created in December 2004 and had its administrative offices at Thaon-les-Vosges. It was disbanded on 31 December 2012 and merged into the new Communauté d'agglomération d'Épinal on 1 January 2013.

== Name ==
Most French commune groupings of this type are named after the region in which they are located or after the largest town (usually also the administrative centre) in the territory. Capavenir is, however, an aspirational (and almost untranslatable) descriptive name evoking the future ("l'avenir") as a destination. The name is sometimes written in upper case letters as CAPAVENIR.

== Composition ==
The Communauté de communes comprised the following communes:

- Thaon-les-Vosges (seat)
- Chavelot
- Frizon
- Gigney
- Girmont
- Mazeley
- Nomexy
- Oncourt

== Administration ==
The Communauté de communes was administered by a community council composed of 21 members and 21 substitutes, representative of member communes, and designated by their respective municipal councils.

=== President ===
List of successive presidents
In office		Name	Party	Capacity	Ref.
Unknown	31 December 2012	Dominique Momon	DVD	Mayor of Thaon-les-Vosges (2009–2020)	
