= Nomexy =

- Commune
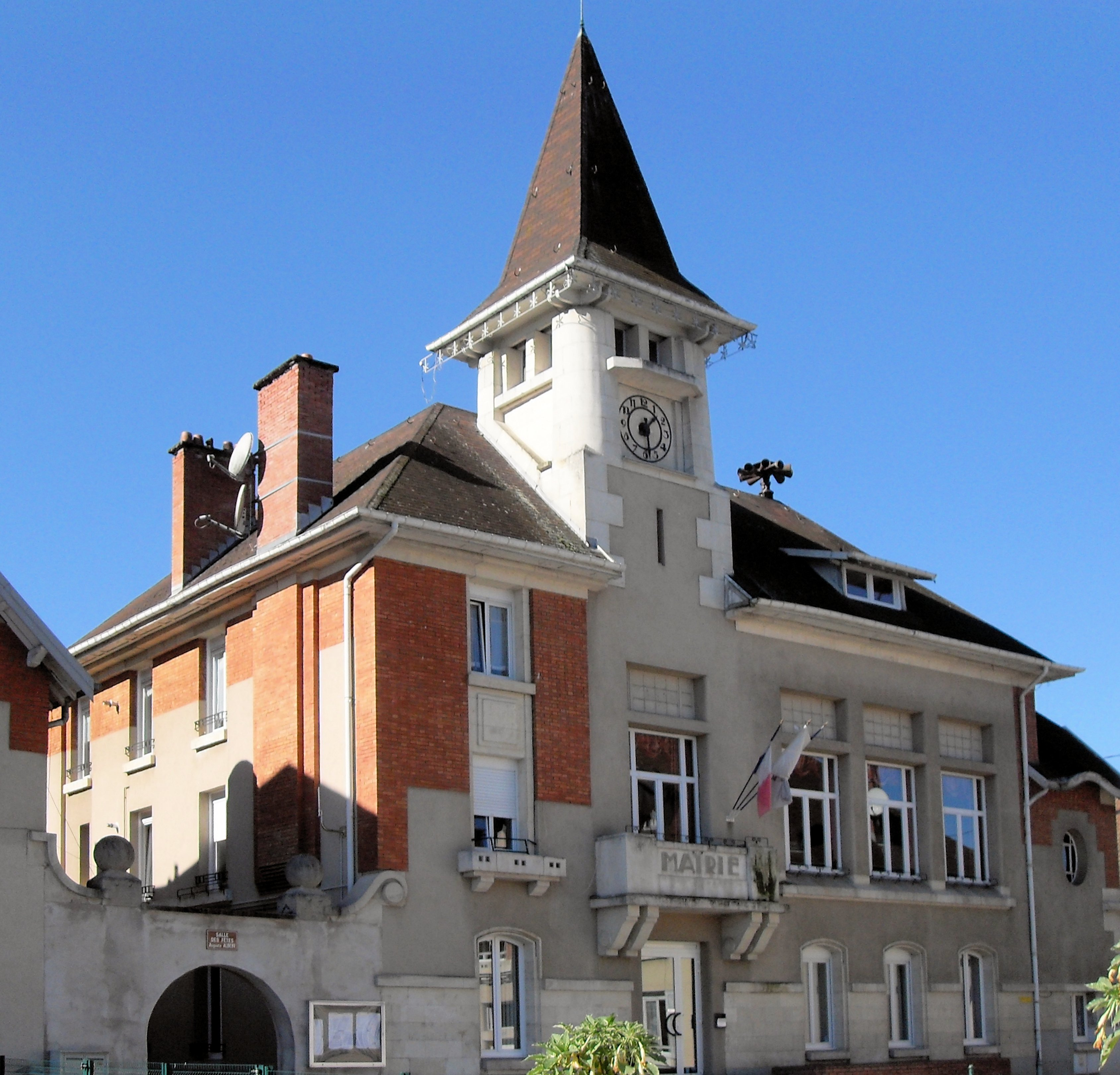
- The town hall in Nomexy

- Coat of arms
- Location of Nomexy
- Location within France Location within Grand Est
- Coordinates: 48°18′25″N 6°23′09″E
- Country: France
- Region: Grand Est
- Department: Vosges
- Arrondissement: Épinal
- Canton: Charmes
- Intercommunality: CA Épinal

Government
  - Mayor (2020–2026): Martine Boulliat
- Area^{1}: 7.95 km^{2} (3.07 sq mi)
- Highest elevation: 375 m (1,230 ft)
- Lowest elevation: 283 m (928 ft)
- Population (2023): 1,905
  - Density: 240/km^{2} (621/sq mi)
- Demonym: Nomexéen
- Time zone: UTC+01:00 (CET)
  - Summer (DST): UTC+02:00 (CEST)
- INSEE/Postal code: 88327 /88440
- ^{1} French Land Register data, which excludes lakes, ponds, glaciers > 1 km^{2} (0.386 sq mi or 247 acres) and river estuaries.

Nomexy (French pronunciation: [nɔmsi]) is a commune in the Vosges department in Grand Est in northeastern France.

Inhabitants are called Nomexéens.

== Geography ==
The commune is positioned on the left bank of the Moselle, directly upstream of its confluence with the little Avière, and across the Moselle from the cantonal capital, Châtel-sur-Moselle. It is 13 kilometres (8 mi) downstream from Épinal.

The commune contains the Canal de l'Est (also called the canal des Vosges), notable for including 93 locks in the 123 kilometres over which it twists and turns and rises and falls between the Moselle near to Nancy, and the river Saône: while crossing the Nomexy commune, the canal runs directly beside the Moselle. The canal remains popular with leisure and recreational users, though the transport of merchandise for which it was constructed during the nineteenth century has been taken over by the Route Nationale RN57 which during the closing years of the twentieth century was upgraded to quasi-autoroute quality from Nancy in the north to Remiremont en route to the Bussang Pass and Mulhouse to the south-east. The road skirts the village of Nomexy on its western side: the village has not one but two access point to the road, shared by means of a bridge across the Moselle with Châtel-sur-Moselle.

The northern part of the commune comprises a 70 hectare Industrial Zone which is an employment magnet for the surrounding area, and includes a number of small and artisanal businesses as well as larger firms including the substantial INNOTHERA textiles and fibres business. There is also a considerable level of commuting to one or other of the many industrial zones on the edges of the small towns that are strung along the Moselle in the Épinal region. Nevertheless, between 1968 and 2006 the population of Nomexy declined by more than 20%, which is part of a larger pattern of migration from the villages to the cities that characterised France as industrialisation accelerated during the second half of the twentieth century.

Although the eastern part of the commune, on the river bank, is relatively flat, on its western and southern sides the wooded hills rise up to 90 meters above the level of the river. Overall roughly 40% of the commune's territory is wooded, while nearer the river the land is either built up or used for agriculture.

Neighbouring communes are Portieux to the north, Châtel-sur-Moselle in the east, Vaxoncourt to the south-east, Igney in the south, Frizon to the south-west and Vincey in the West.

== History ==
There is a record of the watermill on the Avière River having already existed in 1263 when it belonged to the Priory of Aubiey. In the nineteenth century the mill was purchased by a member of the Mathurin family: this was a family of millers that had come from the Vendée, probably driven east by the brutal repression which followed a failed counter-revolution in the 1790s. The mill is now part of a modern flour mill, still owned by the family that acquired it more than a century ago.

The Abbé Constant Olivier, historian and priest, published a history of Nomexy entitled "Nomexy et le prieuré d'Aubiey" in 1900.

== See also ==
- Communes of the Vosges department
