= Padoux =

- Commune
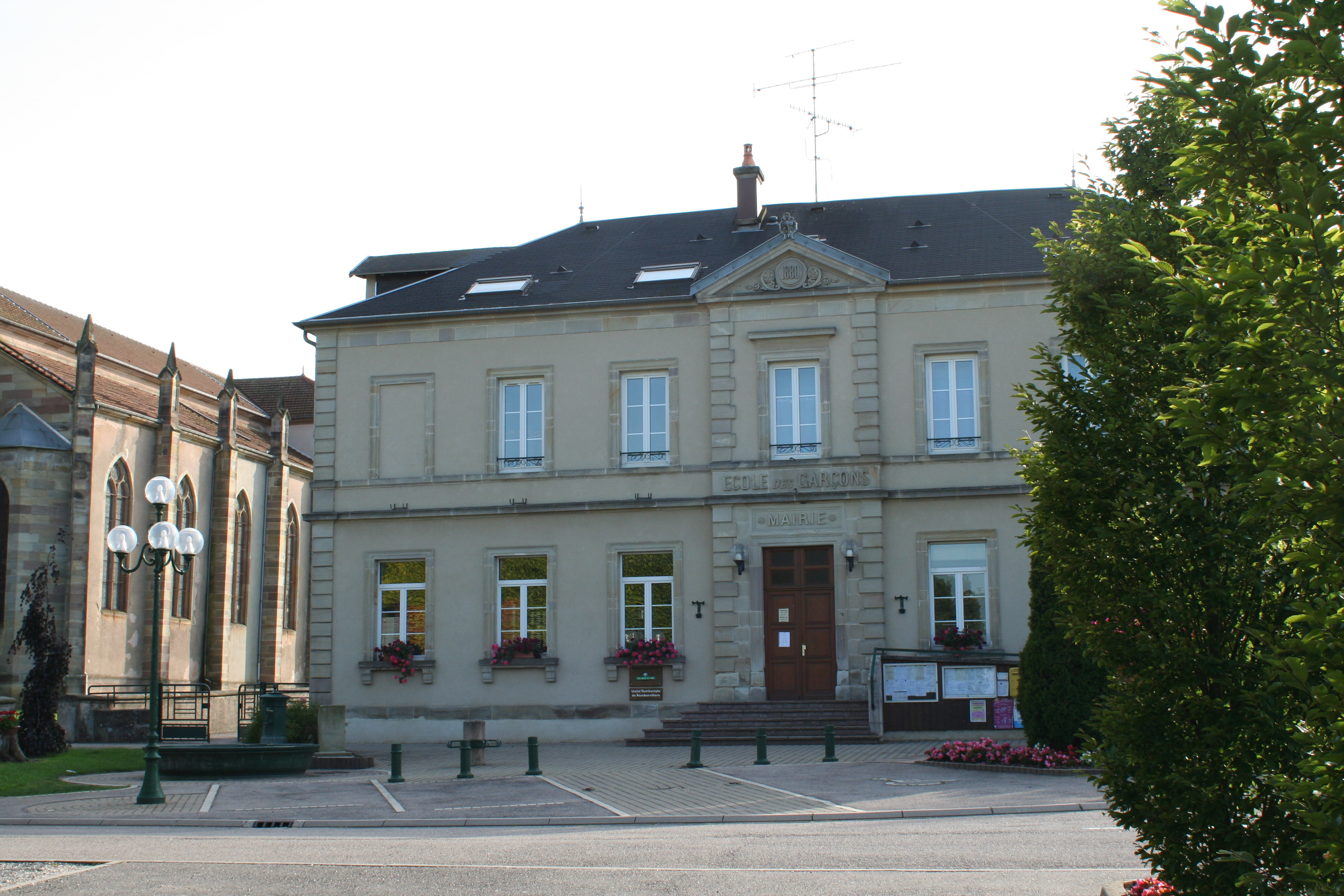
- The town hall and boys' school in Padoux

- Coat of arms
- Location of Padoux
- Location within France Location within Grand Est
- Coordinates: 48°16′51″N 6°34′14″E
- Country: France
- Region: Grand Est
- Department: Vosges
- Arrondissement: Épinal
- Canton: Bruyères
- Intercommunality: Épinal

Government
  - Mayor (2020–2026): Bruno Huguenin
- Area^{1}: 19.35 km^{2} (7.47 sq mi)
- Elevation: 330 m (1,080 ft)
- Highest elevation: 366 m (1,201 ft)
- Lowest elevation: 296 m (971 ft)
- Population (2023): 488
  - Density: 25.2/km^{2} (65.3/sq mi)
- Time zone: UTC+01:00 (CET)
  - Summer (DST): UTC+02:00 (CEST)
- INSEE/Postal code: 88340 /88700
- ^{1} French Land Register data, which excludes lakes, ponds, glaciers > 1 km^{2} (0.386 sq mi or 247 acres) and river estuaries.

Padoux (French pronunciation: [padu]) is a commune in the Vosges department in Grand Est in northeastern France.

== Population ==
Inhabitants are called Padoselliens in French.

Historical population
Year	Pop.	±% p.a.
1968	383	—
1975	376	−0.26%
1982	397	+0.78%
1990	429	+0.97%
1999	435	+0.15%
2007	460	+0.70%
2012	521	+2.52%
2017	514	−0.27%
2023	488	−0.86%
Source: INSEE

== Geography ==
Padoux is positioned between Épinal et Rambervillers: nevertheless, it is administratively within the canton of Bruyères, some 20 kilometres (12 mi)across country to the south-east. Directly the west, and set in the Forest of Padoux, is the little village of Badménil-aux-Bois.

The watershed/drainage divide between the river basins of the Meurthe and of the Moselle runs through the commune. Two much smaller rivers that cross it are the Mortagne and the Padozel. The landscape and its customs are at a point of transition between mountain country to the east and the gently rolling landscape Lorriane Plain to the west. The soil type reflects a mixture of underlying limestone and clay, with very little Silicon dioxide. The result is a soil known locally as white earth (terres blanches) and ashen earth (terres rousses): the latter are particularly suitable for growing cereals in general and especially for wheat.

== History ==
In 1594 and again in 1710 Padoux is recorded as subject to the bailiwick of Épinal: in 1751 it transferred to that of Châtel. In 1790, as part of the administrative reform that followed the French Revolution, Padoux found itself included in the canton of Rambervillers. The present administrative map of France dates from 1800.

On 21 June 1940 Jean-Paul Sartre was arrested at Padoux by the Germans. At the time he was serving with the French military as a meteorologist.

== Events ==
Former mayor Alphonse Vauthier relaunched during the second half of the twentieth century an Easter Monday livestock fair which each year continues to attract crowds of traders and of onlookers.

== See also ==
- Communes of the Vosges department
