= Fomerey =

- Commune
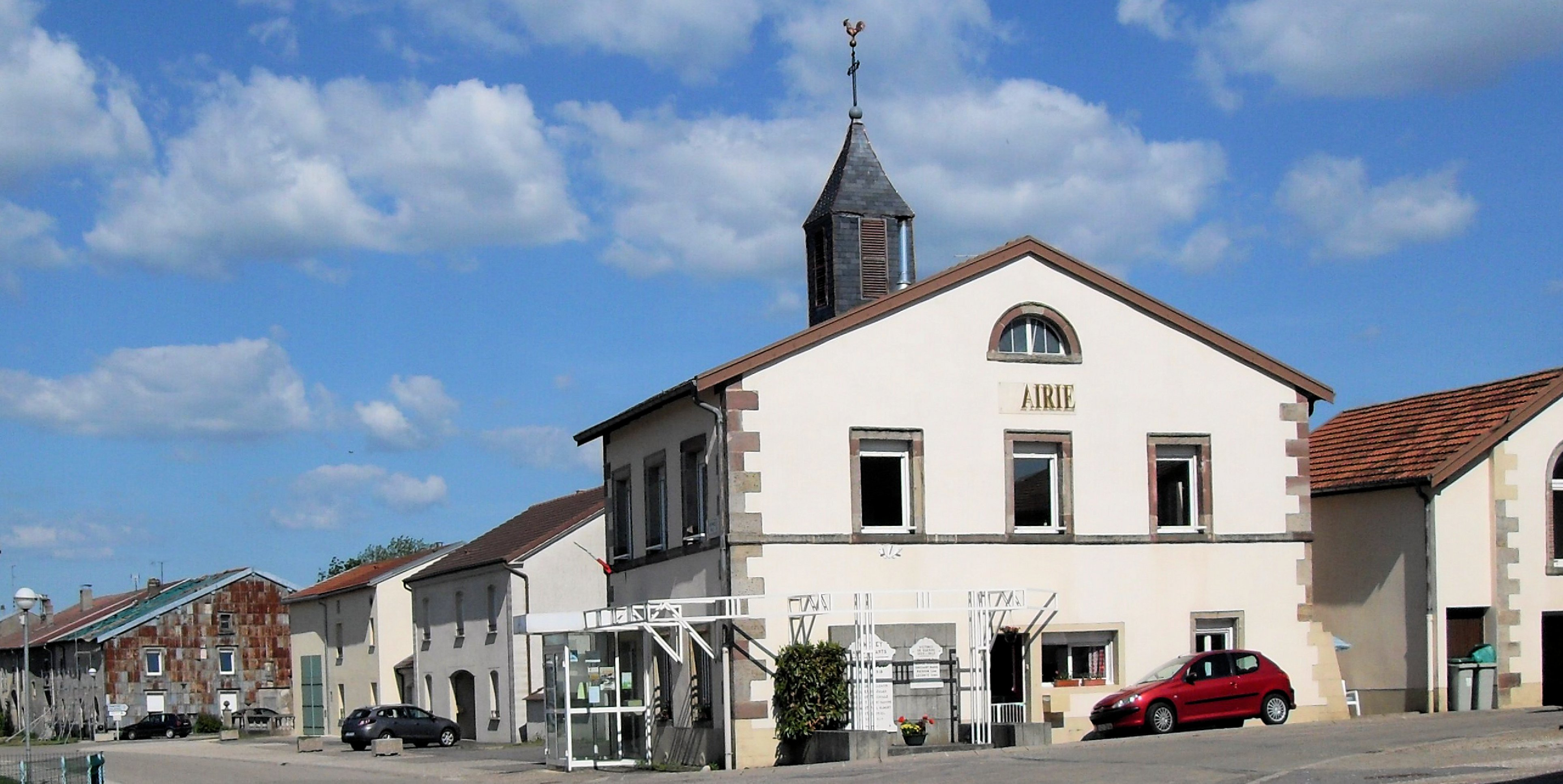
- The town hall in Fomerey
- Location of Fomerey
- Location within France Location within Grand Est
- Coordinates: 48°13′17″N 6°20′23″E
- Country: France
- Region: Grand Est
- Department: Vosges
- Arrondissement: Épinal
- Canton: Golbey
- Intercommunality: CA Épinal

Government
  - Mayor (2020–2026): Nicolas Humbert
- Area^{1}: 5.03 km^{2} (1.94 sq mi)
- Highest elevation: 381 m (1,250 ft)
- Lowest elevation: 333 m (1,093 ft)
- Population (2023): 138
  - Density: 27.4/km^{2} (71.1/sq mi)
- Time zone: UTC+01:00 (CET)
  - Summer (DST): UTC+02:00 (CEST)
- INSEE/Postal code: 88174 /88390
- ^{1} French Land Register data, which excludes lakes, ponds, glaciers > 1 km^{2} (0.386 sq mi or 247 acres) and river estuaries.

Fomerey (French pronunciation: [fɔmʁɛ]) is a commune in the Vosges department in Grand Est in northeastern France.

== See also ==
- Communes of the Vosges department
