= Domèvre-sur-Avière =

- Commune
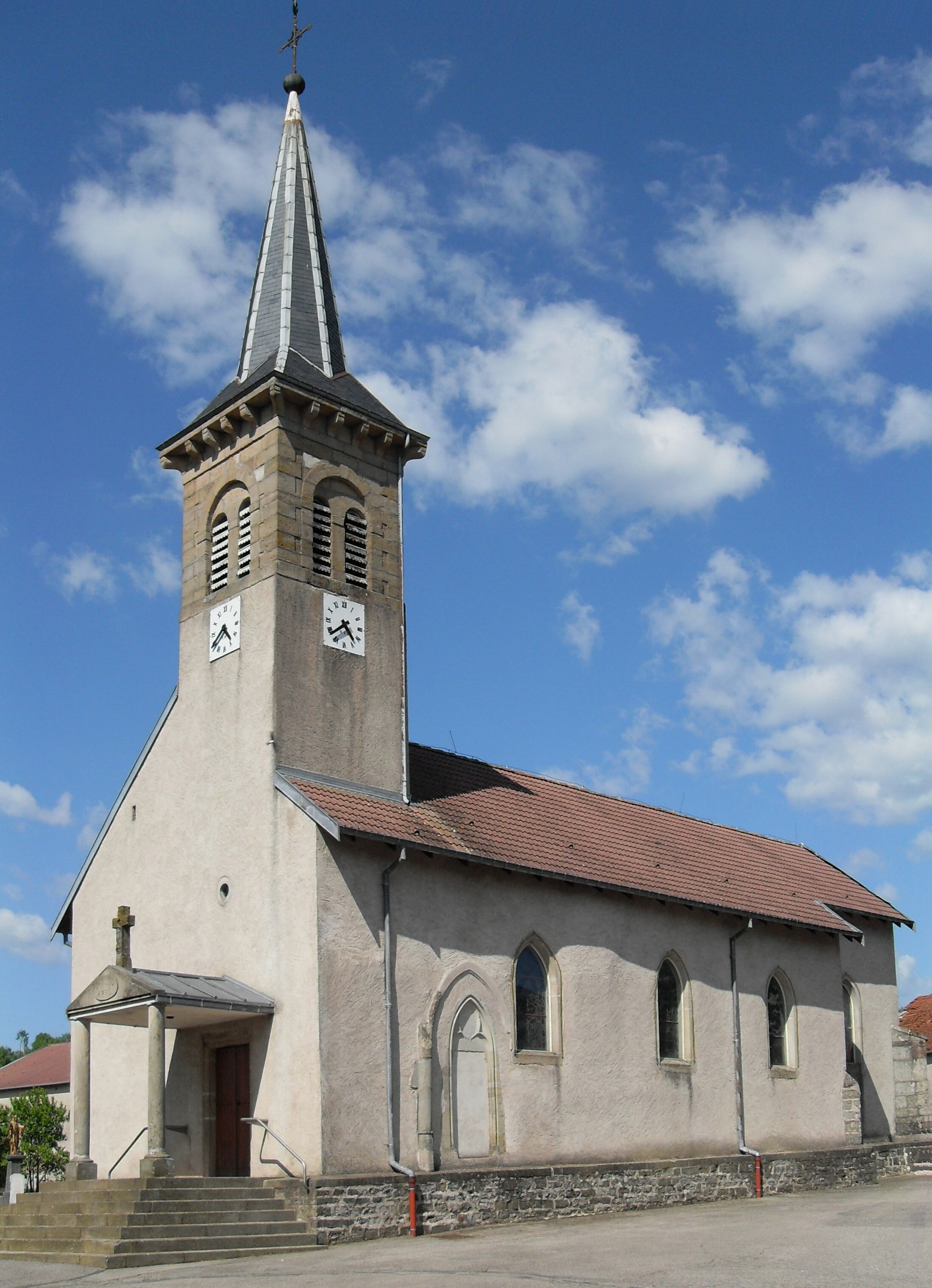
- The church in Domèvre-sur-Avière

- Coat of arms
- Location of Domèvre-sur-Avière
- Location within France Location within Grand Est
- Coordinates: 48°12′51″N 6°22′51″E
- Country: France
- Region: Grand Est
- Department: Vosges
- Arrondissement: Épinal
- Canton: Golbey
- Intercommunality: CA Épinal

Government
  - Mayor (2020–2026): Bernadette Marquis
- Area^{1}: 9.16 km^{2} (3.54 sq mi)
- Elevation: 340 m (1,120 ft)
- Highest elevation: 376 m (1,234 ft)
- Lowest elevation: 319 m (1,047 ft)
- Population (2023): 439
  - Density: 47.9/km^{2} (124/sq mi)
- Time zone: UTC+01:00 (CET)
  - Summer (DST): UTC+02:00 (CEST)
- INSEE/Postal code: 88142 /88390
- ^{1} French Land Register data, which excludes lakes, ponds, glaciers > 1 km^{2} (0.386 sq mi or 247 acres) and river estuaries.

Domèvre-sur-Avière (French pronunciation: [dɔmɛvʁ syʁ avjɛʁ]) is a commune in the Vosges department in Grand Est in northeastern France.

== See also ==
- Communes of the Vosges department
