= Arboretum de Mazeley =

Arboretum in Mazeley, Vosges, Grand Est, France

Coordinates: 47.95°N 5.75°E

The Arboretum de Mazeley (1.8 hectares) is an arboretum located in Mazeley, Vosges, Grand Est, France.

== See also ==
- List of botanical gardens in France
