= Oncourt =

- Part of Thaon-les-Vosges
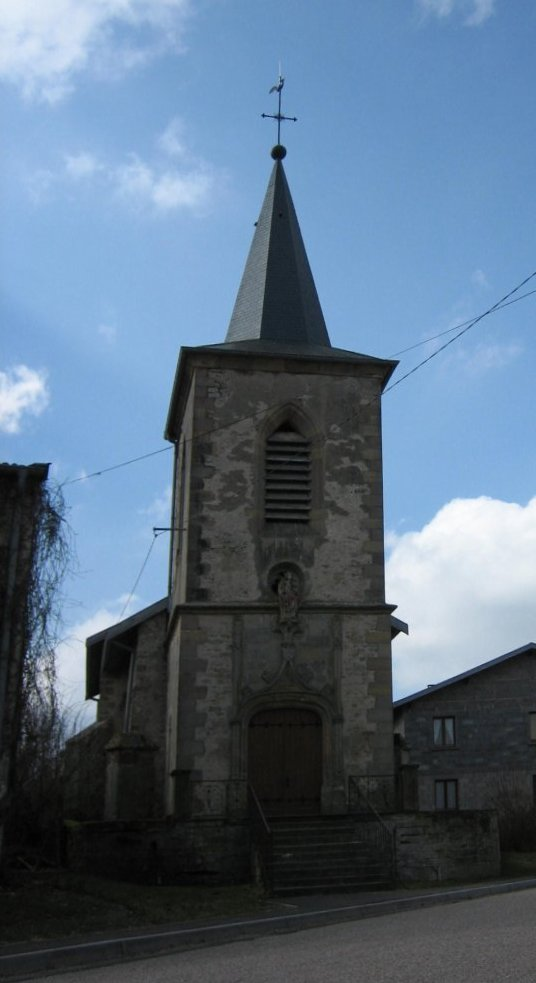
- Location of Oncourt
- Location within France Location within Grand Est
- Coordinates: 48°15′09″N 6°22′33″E
- Country: France
- Region: Grand Est
- Department: Vosges
- Arrondissement: Épinal
- Canton: Golbey
- Commune: Thaon-les-Vosges
- Area^{1}: 3.94 km^{2} (1.52 sq mi)
- Highest elevation: 377 m (1,237 ft)
- Lowest elevation: 310 m (1,020 ft)
- Population (2022): 184
  - Density: 46.7/km^{2} (121/sq mi)
- Time zone: UTC+01:00 (CET)
  - Summer (DST): UTC+02:00 (CEST)
- Postal code: 88150
- ^{1} French Land Register data, which excludes lakes, ponds, glaciers > 1 km^{2} (0.386 sq mi or 247 acres) and river estuaries.

Oncourt (French pronunciation: [ɔ̃kuʁ]) is a former commune in the Vosges department in northeastern France. On 1 January 2016, it was merged into the new commune Capavenir-Vosges, which was renamed Thaon-les-Vosges effective 2022. Inhabitants are called Oncourtois.

== Geography ==
The village is positioned some 3 kilometres (2 mi) to the west of the village of Thaon-les-Vosges, and crossed by the little river Avière, itself a tributary of the Moselle.

== Personalities ==
Laurent Mariotte, actor and animator with a French radio and television providers, spent a part of his childhood and adolescence at Oncourt.

== See also ==
- Communes of the Vosges department
