= Aydoilles =

- Commune
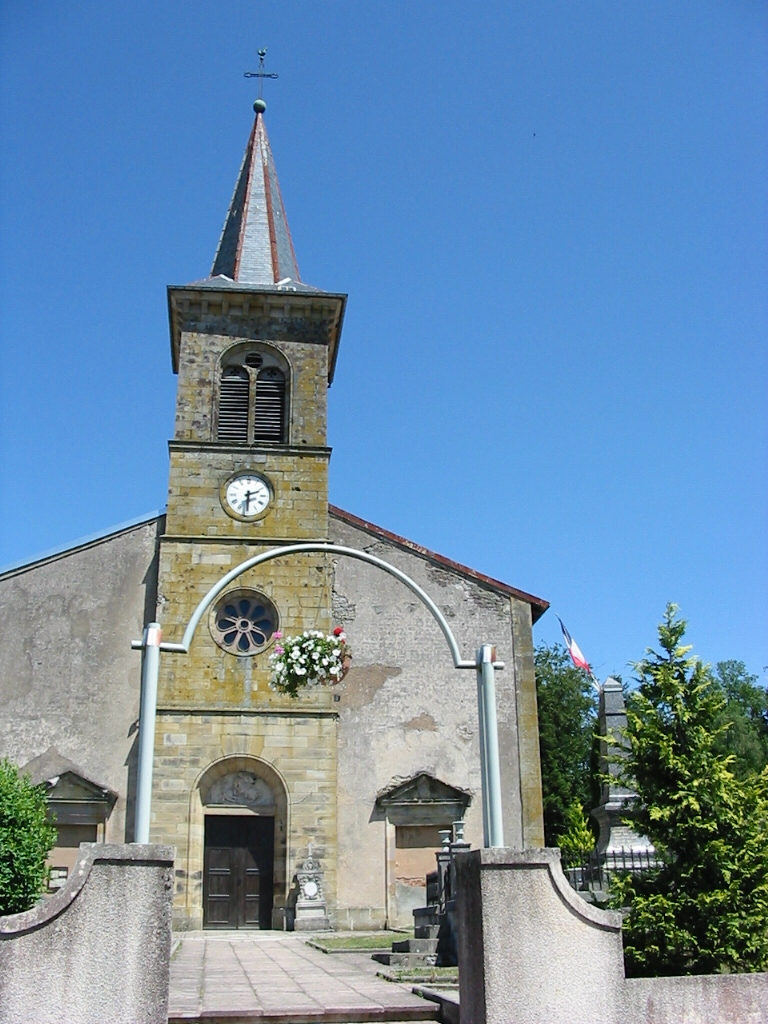
- Saint-Georges Church

- Coat of arms
- Location of Aydoilles
- Location within France Location within Grand Est
- Coordinates: 48°12′43″N 6°34′22″E
- Country: France
- Region: Grand Est
- Department: Vosges
- Arrondissement: Épinal
- Canton: Bruyères
- Intercommunality: CA Épinal

Government
  - Mayor (2020–2026): Stéphane Chrisment
- Area^{1}: 10 km^{2} (3.9 sq mi)
- Elevation: 395 m (1,296 ft)
- Highest elevation: 491 m (1,611 ft)
- Lowest elevation: 328 m (1,076 ft)
- Population (2023): 1,018
  - Density: 100/km^{2} (260/sq mi)
- Time zone: UTC+01:00 (CET)
  - Summer (DST): UTC+02:00 (CEST)
- INSEE/Postal code: 88026 /88600
- ^{1} French Land Register data, which excludes lakes, ponds, glaciers > 1 km^{2} (0.386 sq mi or 247 acres) and river estuaries.

Aydoilles (French pronunciation: [ɛdwal]) is a commune in the Vosges department in Grand Est in northeastern France.

== See also ==
- Communes of the Vosges department
