= Darnieulles =

- Commune
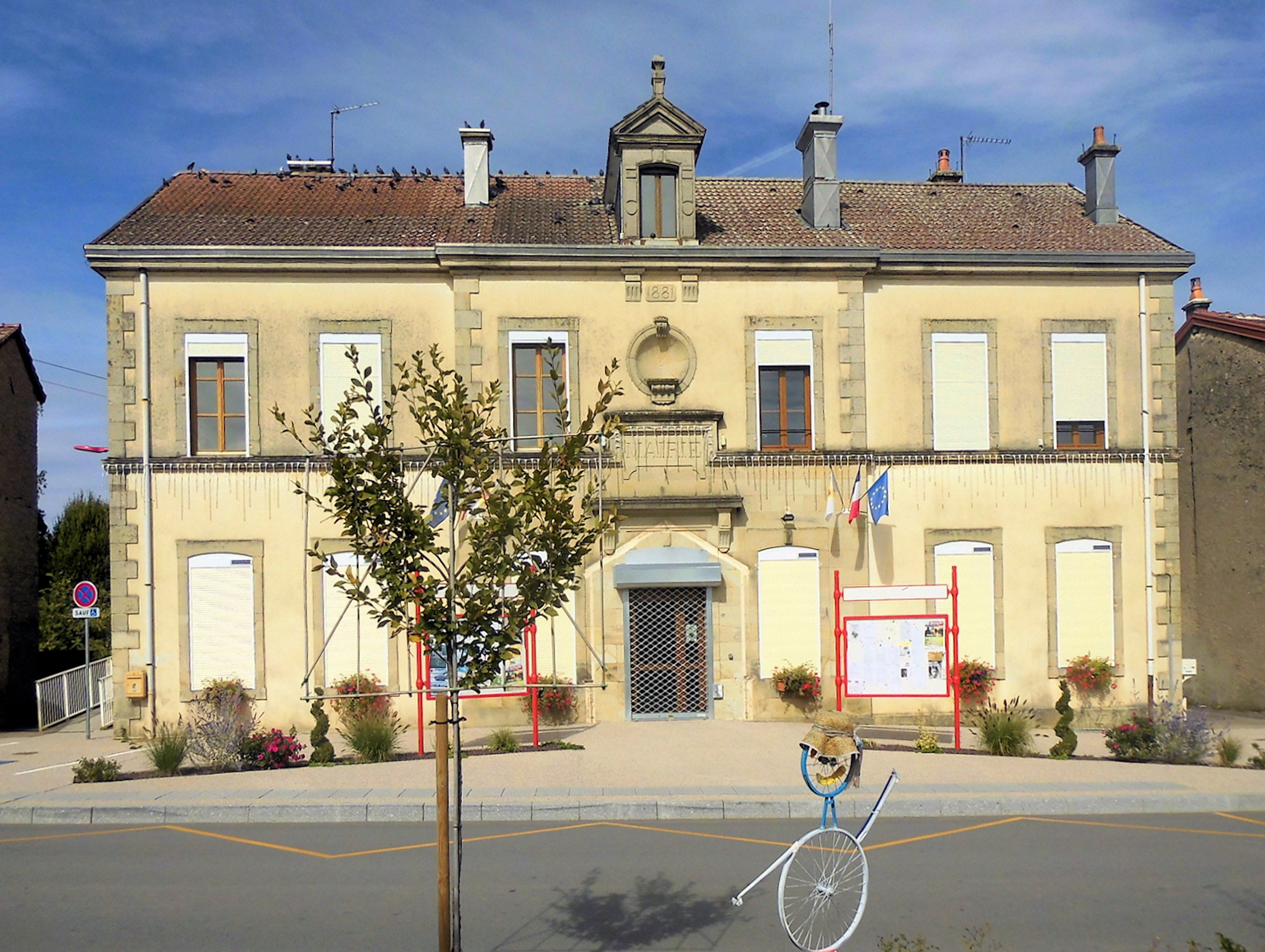
- The town hall in Darnieulles

- Coat of arms
- Location of Darnieulles
- Location within France Location within Grand Est
- Coordinates: 48°11′59″N 6°21′11″E
- Country: France
- Region: Grand Est
- Department: Vosges
- Arrondissement: Épinal
- Canton: Golbey
- Intercommunality: CA Épinal

Government
  - Mayor (2020–2026): Philippe Retournard
- Area^{1}: 10.1 km^{2} (3.9 sq mi)
- Elevation: 341 m (1,119 ft)
- Highest elevation: 396 m (1,299 ft)
- Lowest elevation: 339 m (1,112 ft)
- Population (2023): 1,364
  - Density: 135/km^{2} (350/sq mi)
- Time zone: UTC+01:00 (CET)
  - Summer (DST): UTC+02:00 (CEST)
- INSEE/Postal code: 88126 /88390
- ^{1} French Land Register data, which excludes lakes, ponds, glaciers > 1 km^{2} (0.386 sq mi or 247 acres) and river estuaries.

Darnieulles (French pronunciation: [daʁnjœl]) is a commune in the Vosges department in Grand Est in northeastern France.

== See also ==
- Communes of the Vosges department
