= Communauté d'agglomération d'Épinal =

Coordinates: 48.202°N 6.426°E

Épinal
- Communauté d'agglomération
- Country: France
- Region: Grand Est
- Department: Vosges
- No. of communes: {{{nbcomm}}}
- Established: 2013
- Area: 1,118.4 km^{2} (431.8 sq mi)
- Population (2018): 111,259
  - Density: 99.481/km^{2} (257.65/sq mi)

The Communauté d'agglomération d'Épinal is an administrative association of communes in the Vosges department of eastern France. It was created on 1 January 2013 by the merger of the former Communauté d'agglomération d'Épinal-Golbey, Communauté de communes CAPAVENIR, Communauté de communes du Pays d'Olima et du Val d'Avière, Communauté de communes Est-Épinal Développement and 11 other communes. On 1 January 2017 it was expanded with the Communauté de communes du Val de Vôge, Communauté de communes de la Vôge vers les Rives de la Moselle, Communauté de communes de la Moyenne Moselle and 4 other communes. On 1 January 2018 it gained 2 communes from the Communauté de communes de Mirecourt Dompaire. It consists of 78 communes, and has its administrative offices at Golbey. Its area is 1118.4 km^{2}. Its population was 111,259 in 2018, of which 32,223 in Épinal proper.

== Composition ==
The communauté d'agglomération consists of the following 78 communes:

1. Arches
2. Archettes
3. Aydoilles
4. Badménil-aux-Bois
5. La Baffe
6. Bayecourt
7. Bellefontaine
8. Brantigny
9. Chamagne
10. Chantraine
11. La Chapelle-aux-Bois
12. Charmes
13. Charmois-l'Orgueilleux
14. Châtel-sur-Moselle
15. Chaumousey
16. Chavelot
17. Le Clerjus
18. Damas-aux-Bois
19. Darnieulles
20. Deyvillers
21. Dignonville
22. Dinozé
23. Dogneville
24. Domèvre-sur-Avière
25. Domèvre-sur-Durbion
26. Dompierre
27. Dounoux
28. Épinal
29. Essegney
30. Florémont
31. Fomerey
32. Fontenoy-le-Château
33. Les Forges
34. Frizon
35. Gigney
36. Girancourt
37. Golbey
38. Gruey-lès-Surance
39. Hadigny-les-Verrières
40. Hadol
41. Haillainville
42. La Haye
43. Hergugney
44. Igney
45. Jarménil
46. Jeuxey
47. Langley
48. Longchamp
49. Mazeley
50. Montmotier
51. Moriville
52. Nomexy
53. Padoux
54. Pallegney
55. Portieux
56. Pouxeux
57. Raon-aux-Bois
58. Rehaincourt
59. Renauvoid
60. Rugney
61. Sanchey
62. Savigny
63. Sercœur
64. Socourt
65. Thaon-les-Vosges
66. Trémonzey
67. Ubexy
68. Uriménil
69. Uxegney
70. Uzemain
71. Vaudéville
72. Vaxoncourt
73. Villoncourt
74. Vincey
75. La Vôge-les-Bains
76. Les Voivres
77. Xertigny
78. Zincourt
