= Girancourt =

- Commune
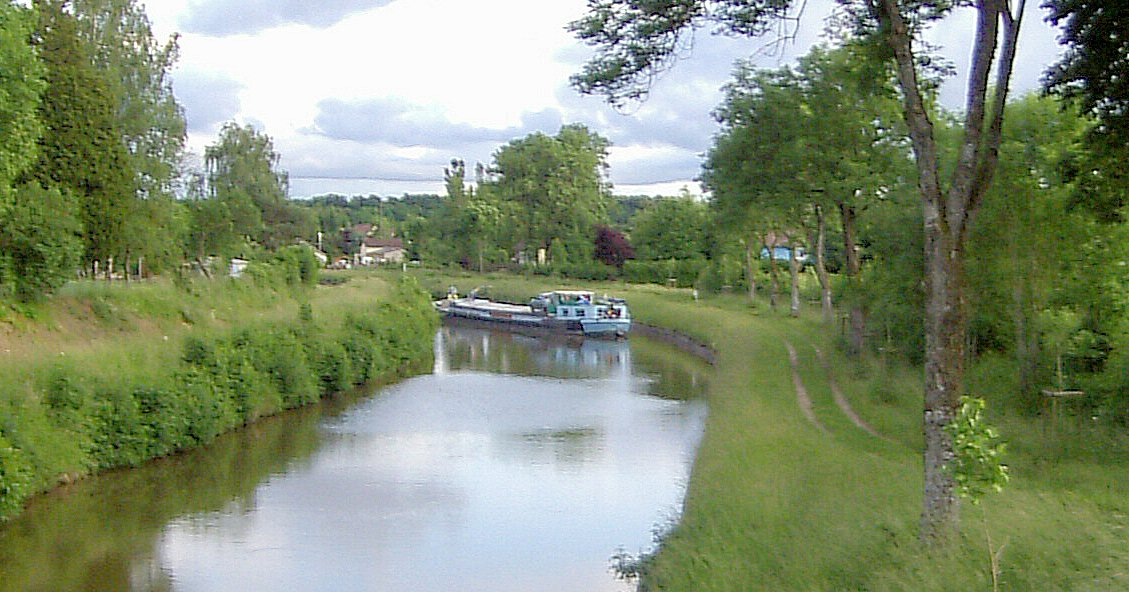
- Canal de l'Est

- Coat of arms
- Location of Girancourt
- Location within France Location within Grand Est
- Coordinates: 48°09′51″N 6°18′30″E
- Country: France
- Region: Grand Est
- Department: Vosges
- Arrondissement: Épinal
- Canton: Darney
- Intercommunality: CA Épinal

Government
  - Mayor (2020–2026): Yannick Villemin
- Area^{1}: 17.66 km^{2} (6.82 sq mi)
- Elevation: 352 m (1,155 ft)
- Highest elevation: 461 m (1,512 ft)
- Lowest elevation: 337 m (1,106 ft)
- Population (2023): 877
  - Density: 49.7/km^{2} (129/sq mi)
- Time zone: UTC+01:00 (CET)
  - Summer (DST): UTC+02:00 (CEST)
- INSEE/Postal code: 88201 /88390
- ^{1} French Land Register data, which excludes lakes, ponds, glaciers > 1 km^{2} (0.386 sq mi or 247 acres) and river estuaries.

Girancourt (French pronunciation: [ʒiʁɑ̃kuʁ]) is a commune in the Vosges department in Grand Est in northeastern France.

== See also ==
- Communes of the Vosges department
