= Portieux =

- Commune
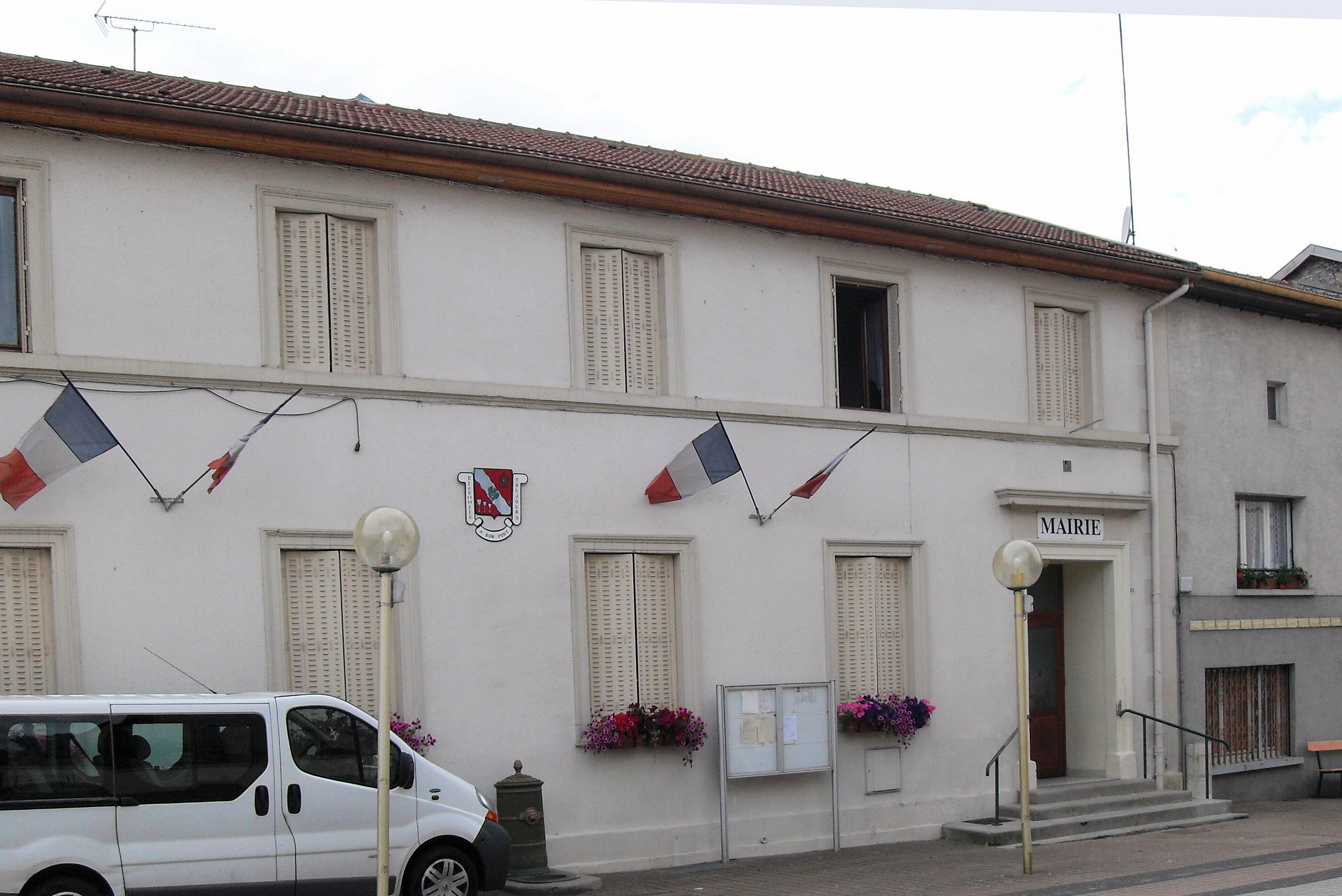
- The town hall in Portieux

- Coat of arms
- Location of Portieux
- Location within France Location within Grand Est
- Coordinates: 48°20′40″N 6°20′44″E
- Country: France
- Region: Grand Est
- Department: Vosges
- Arrondissement: Épinal
- Canton: Charmes
- Intercommunality: CA Épinal

Government
  - Mayor (2020–2026): Christelle Paillard
- Area^{1}: 7.9 km^{2} (3.1 sq mi)
- Elevation: 296 m (971 ft)
- Highest elevation: 363 m (1,191 ft)
- Lowest elevation: 275 m (902 ft)
- Population (2023): 1,224
  - Density: 150/km^{2} (400/sq mi)
- Time zone: UTC+01:00 (CET)
  - Summer (DST): UTC+02:00 (CEST)
- INSEE/Postal code: 88355 /88330
- ^{1} French Land Register data, which excludes lakes, ponds, glaciers > 1 km^{2} (0.386 sq mi or 247 acres) and river estuaries.

Portieux (French pronunciation: [pɔʁtjø]) is a commune in the Vosges department in Grand Est in northeastern France.

Inhabitants are called Portessiens.

== Geography ==
The traditional village of Portieux sits on the right bank of the Moselle 4 kilometres (2 mi) upstream from Charmes and across the river from Vincey. About 4 kilometres (2 mi) inland, to the east, is a substantial glass works.

== History ==
Formerly known by its Latin name, Portus Coelorum, the little town grew up around a priory founded in 1107 by Gérard of Vaudémont, which relocated to Nancy in 1616.

The town got a second chance at the start of the eighteenth century courtesy of the Dukes of Lorraine. In 1705 Duke Leopold rewarded his faithful, courageous and devoted steward by granting him the right to establish a glass works on the edge of the forest at Portieux. François Magnien amply justified his patron's generosity: the enterprise quickly grew and acquired fame across Europe. It continues to flourish.

== See also ==
- Communes of the Vosges department
