= Dompierre, Vosges =

Dompierre
- Commune
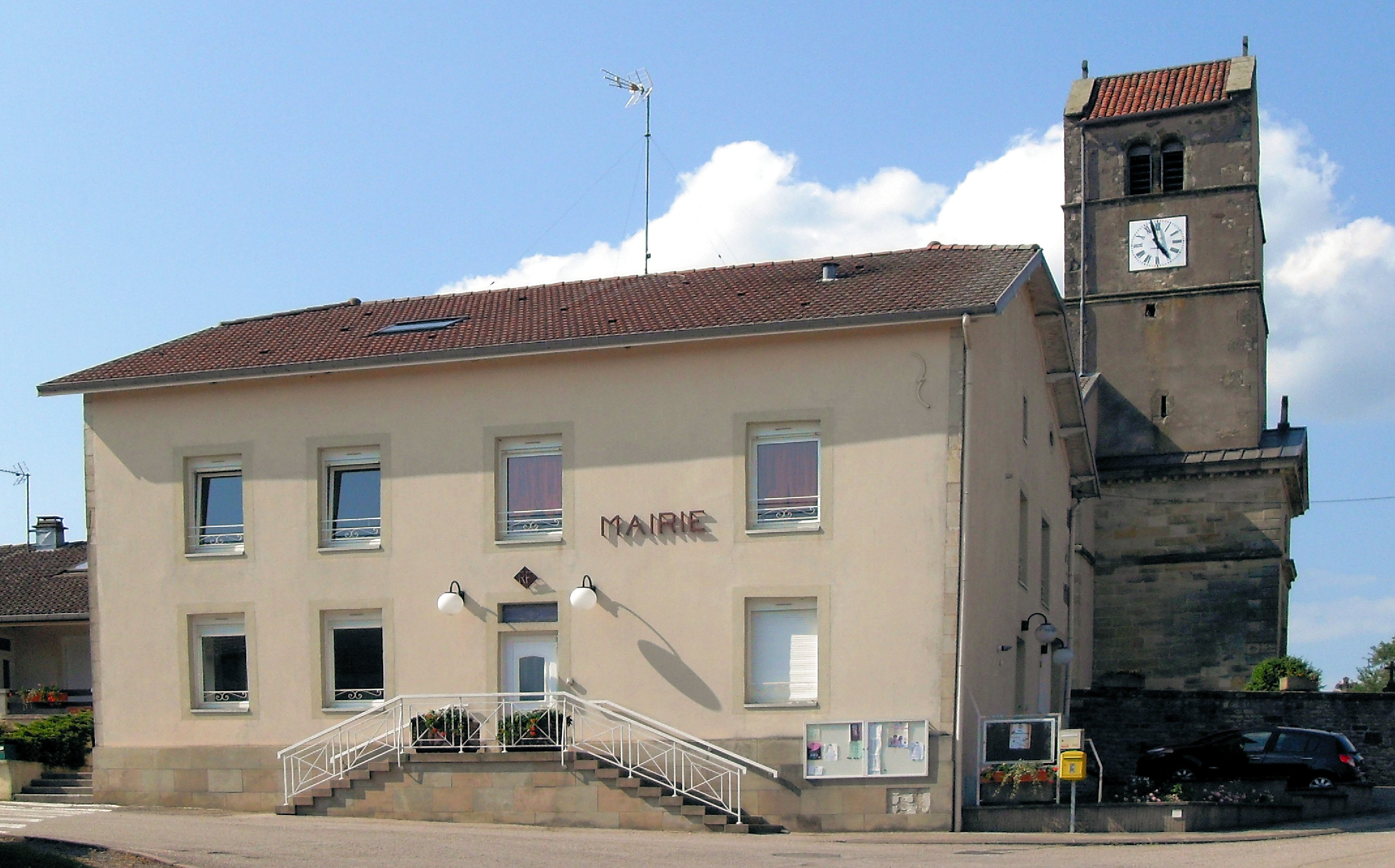
- The town hall in Dompierre
- Location of Dompierre
- Location within France Location within Grand Est
- Coordinates: 48°15′13″N 6°33′52″E
- Country: France
- Region: Grand Est
- Department: Vosges
- Arrondissement: Épinal
- Canton: Bruyères
- Intercommunality: CA Épinal

Government
  - Mayor (2020–2026): Annie Jacqueline Feve
- Area^{1}: 8.88 km^{2} (3.43 sq mi)
- Highest elevation: 354 m (1,161 ft)
- Lowest elevation: 322 m (1,056 ft)
- Population (2023): 238
  - Density: 26.8/km^{2} (69.4/sq mi)
- Time zone: UTC+01:00 (CET)
  - Summer (DST): UTC+02:00 (CEST)
- INSEE/Postal code: 88152 /88600
- ^{1} French Land Register data, which excludes lakes, ponds, glaciers > 1 km^{2} (0.386 sq mi or 247 acres) and river estuaries.

Dompierre (French pronunciation: [dɔ̃pjɛʁ]) is a commune in the Vosges department in Grand Est in northeastern France.

== See also ==
- Communes of the Vosges department
