= Golbey =

- Commune
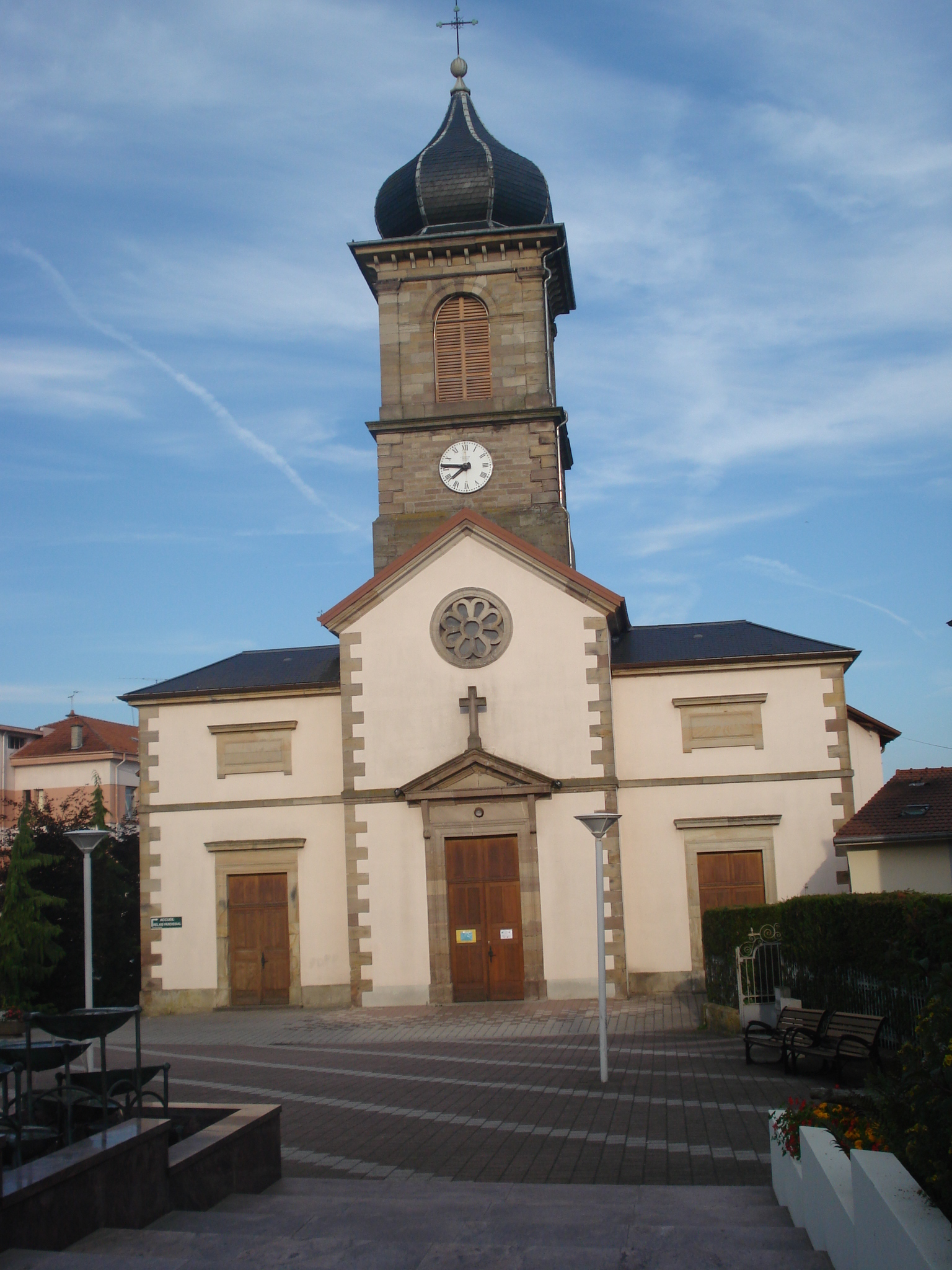
- Church of Saint-Abdon-et-Sennen

- Coat of arms
- Location of Golbey
- Location within France Location within Grand Est
- Coordinates: 48°11′48″N 6°26′17″E
- Country: France
- Region: Grand Est
- Department: Vosges
- Arrondissement: Épinal
- Canton: Golbey
- Intercommunality: CA Épinal

Government
  - Mayor (2020–2026): Roger Alémani
- Area^{1}: 9.49 km^{2} (3.66 sq mi)
- Highest elevation: 386 m (1,266 ft)
- Lowest elevation: 313 m (1,027 ft)
- Population (2023): 8,832
  - Density: 931/km^{2} (2,410/sq mi)
- Time zone: UTC+01:00 (CET)
  - Summer (DST): UTC+02:00 (CEST)
- INSEE/Postal code: 88209 /88190
- ^{1} French Land Register data, which excludes lakes, ponds, glaciers > 1 km^{2} (0.386 sq mi or 247 acres) and river estuaries.

Golbey (French pronunciation: [ɡɔlbɛ]) is a commune in the Vosges department in Grand Est in northeastern France. It lies on the left bank of the Moselle, directly north of Épinal.

== Population ==
Historical population
Year	Pop.	±% p.a.
1968	7,579	—
1975	8,457	+1.58%
1982	7,822	−1.11%
1990	7,892	+0.11%
1999	7,929	+0.05%
2007	8,220	+0.45%
2012	8,402	+0.44%
2017	8,623	+0.52%
2023	8,832	+0.40%
Source: INSEE

== See also ==
- Communes of the Vosges department
