= Mazeley =

- Commune
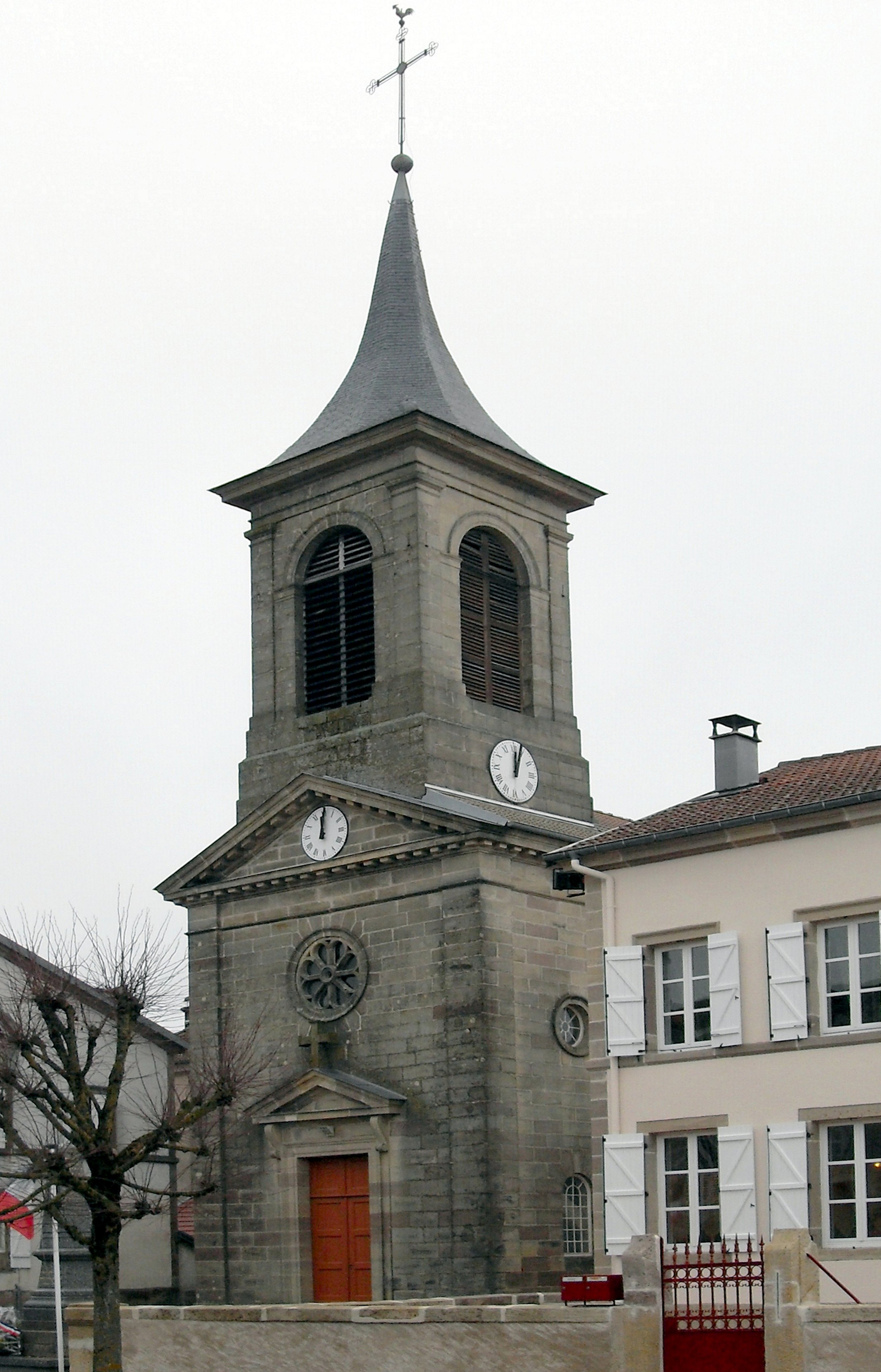
- The church in Mazeley

- Coat of arms
- Location of Mazeley
- Location within France Location within Grand Est
- Coordinates: 48°14′34″N 6°20′22″E
- Country: France
- Region: Grand Est
- Department: Vosges
- Arrondissement: Épinal
- Canton: Golbey
- Intercommunality: CA Épinal

Government
  - Mayor (2020–2026): Pascal Dugravot
- Area^{1}: 10.39 km^{2} (4.01 sq mi)
- Highest elevation: 415 m (1,362 ft)
- Lowest elevation: 320 m (1,050 ft)
- Population (2023): 266
  - Density: 25.6/km^{2} (66.3/sq mi)
- Time zone: UTC+01:00 (CET)
  - Summer (DST): UTC+02:00 (CEST)
- INSEE/Postal code: 88294 /88150
- ^{1} French Land Register data, which excludes lakes, ponds, glaciers > 1 km^{2} (0.386 sq mi or 247 acres) and river estuaries.

Mazeley (French pronunciation: [mazlɛ]) is a commune in the Vosges department in Grand Est in northeastern France.

== Geography ==
The village lies at the junction of three or four minor roads some 10 kilometres (6 mi) northwest of Épinal.

== History ==
Several archaeological discoveries indicate that the area was occupied in Roman times. A section of paved roadway was unearthed in the local woods in 1861, followed in 1988 by the discovery of a Gallo-Roman road in the Chanot district. Also discovered in 1988 an old road visible over more than a kilometre in an area called Donzey Wood (Bois de Donzey) heading in the direction of Gigney

== Points of interest ==
- Arboretum de Mazeley

== See also ==
- Communes of the Vosges department
