= Girmont =

- Part of Thaon-les-Vosges
- Coat of arms
- Location of Girmont
- Location within France Location within Grand Est
- Coordinates: 48°15′43″N 6°26′19″E
- Country: France
- Region: Grand Est
- Department: Vosges
- Arrondissement: Épinal
- Canton: Golbey
- Commune: Thaon-les-Vosges
- Area^{1}: 12.73 km^{2} (4.92 sq mi)
- Highest elevation: 376 m (1,234 ft)
- Lowest elevation: 299 m (981 ft)
- Population (2022): 953
  - Density: 74.9/km^{2} (194/sq mi)
- Time zone: UTC+01:00 (CET)
  - Summer (DST): UTC+02:00 (CEST)
- Postal code: 88150
- ^{1} French Land Register data, which excludes lakes, ponds, glaciers > 1 km^{2} (0.386 sq mi or 247 acres) and river estuaries.

Girmont (French pronunciation: [ʒiʁmɔ̃]) is a former commune in the Vosges department in northeastern France. On 1 January 2016, it was merged into the new commune Capavenir Vosges, which was renamed Thaon-les-Vosges effective 2022.

== See also ==
- Communes of the Vosges department
