= Pallegney =

- Commune
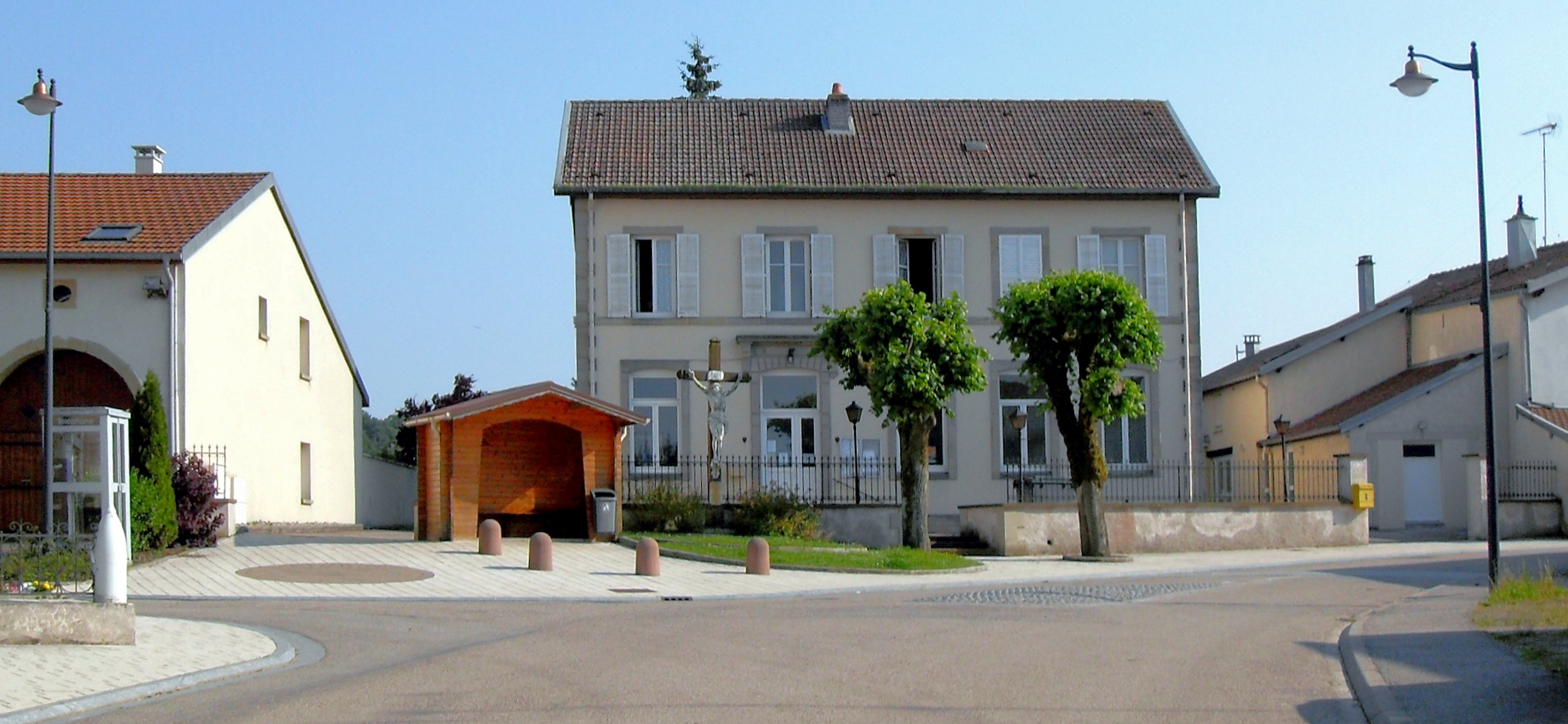
- The town hall in Pallegney
- Location of Pallegney
- Location within France Location within Grand Est
- Coordinates: 48°17′39″N 6°26′43″E
- Country: France
- Region: Grand Est
- Department: Vosges
- Arrondissement: Épinal
- Canton: Bruyères
- Intercommunality: CA Épinal

Government
  - Mayor (2020–2026): Michel Emeraux
- Area^{1}: 5.93 km^{2} (2.29 sq mi)
- Elevation: 325 m (1,066 ft)
- Highest elevation: 350 m (1,150 ft)
- Lowest elevation: 297 m (974 ft)
- Population (2023): 178
  - Density: 30.0/km^{2} (77.7/sq mi)
- Time zone: UTC+01:00 (CET)
  - Summer (DST): UTC+02:00 (CEST)
- INSEE/Postal code: 88342 /88330
- ^{1} French Land Register data, which excludes lakes, ponds, glaciers > 1 km^{2} (0.386 sq mi or 247 acres) and river estuaries.

Pallegney (French pronunciation: [palɲɛ]) is a commune in the Vosges department in Grand Est in northeastern France.

== See also ==
- Communes of the Vosges department
