= Sercœur =

Sercoeur
- Commune
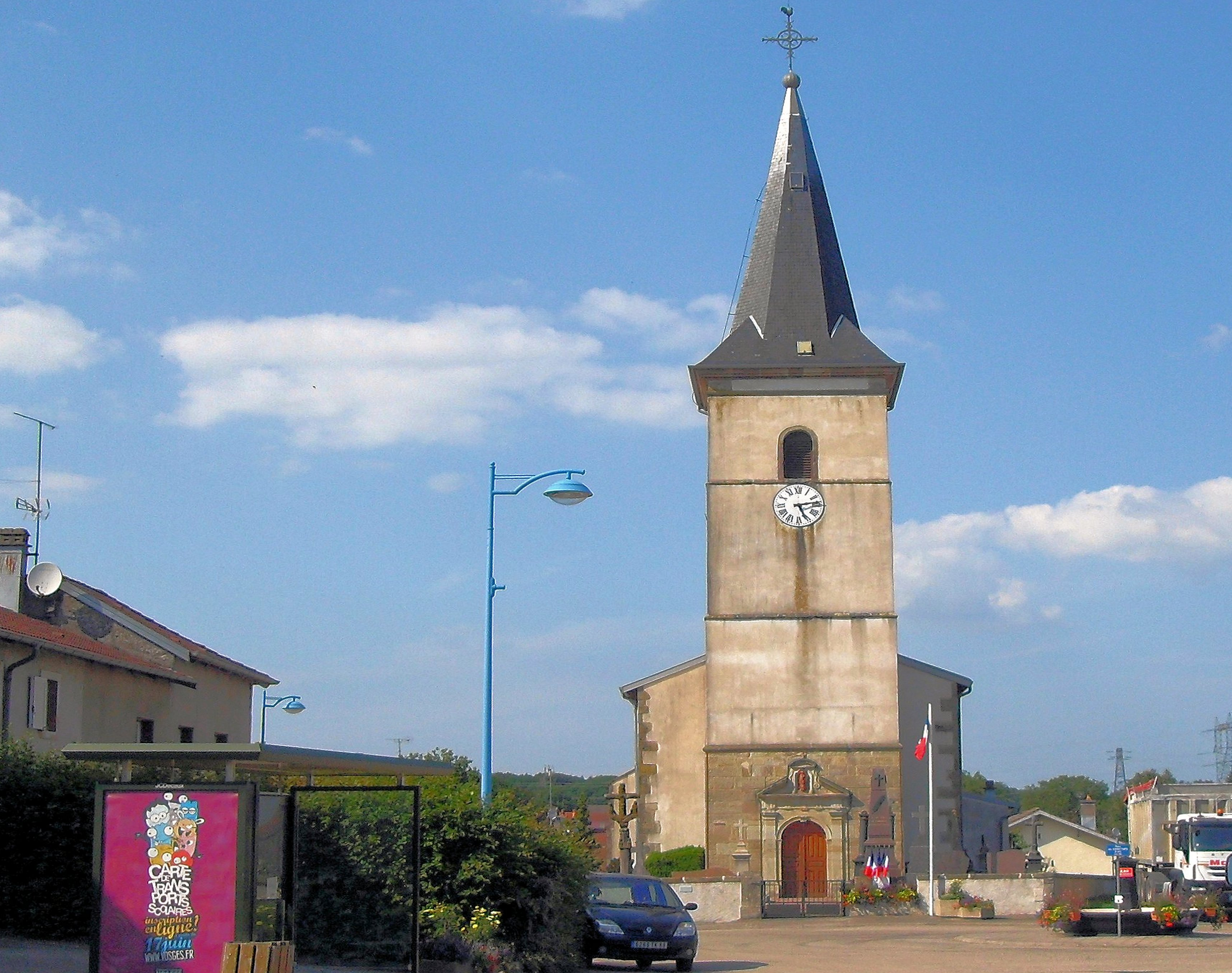
- Church of the Exaltation of the Holy Cross

- Coat of arms
- Location of Sercoeur
- Location within France Location within Grand Est
- Coordinates: 48°15′20″N 6°32′00″E
- Country: France
- Region: Grand Est
- Department: Vosges
- Arrondissement: Épinal
- Canton: Bruyères
- Intercommunality: CA Épinal

Government
  - Mayor (2020–2026): Bénédicte Malivernay
- Area^{1}: 9.18 km^{2} (3.54 sq mi)
- Highest elevation: 363 m (1,191 ft)
- Lowest elevation: 319 m (1,047 ft)
- Population (2023): 225
  - Density: 24.5/km^{2} (63.5/sq mi)
- Time zone: UTC+01:00 (CET)
  - Summer (DST): UTC+02:00 (CEST)
- INSEE/Postal code: 88454 /88600
- ^{1} French Land Register data, which excludes lakes, ponds, glaciers > 1 km^{2} (0.386 sq mi or 247 acres) and river estuaries.

Sercœur (French pronunciation: [sɛʁkœʁ]) is a commune in the Vosges department in Grand Est in northeastern France.

== See also ==
- Communes of the Vosges department
