= Bayecourt =

- Commune
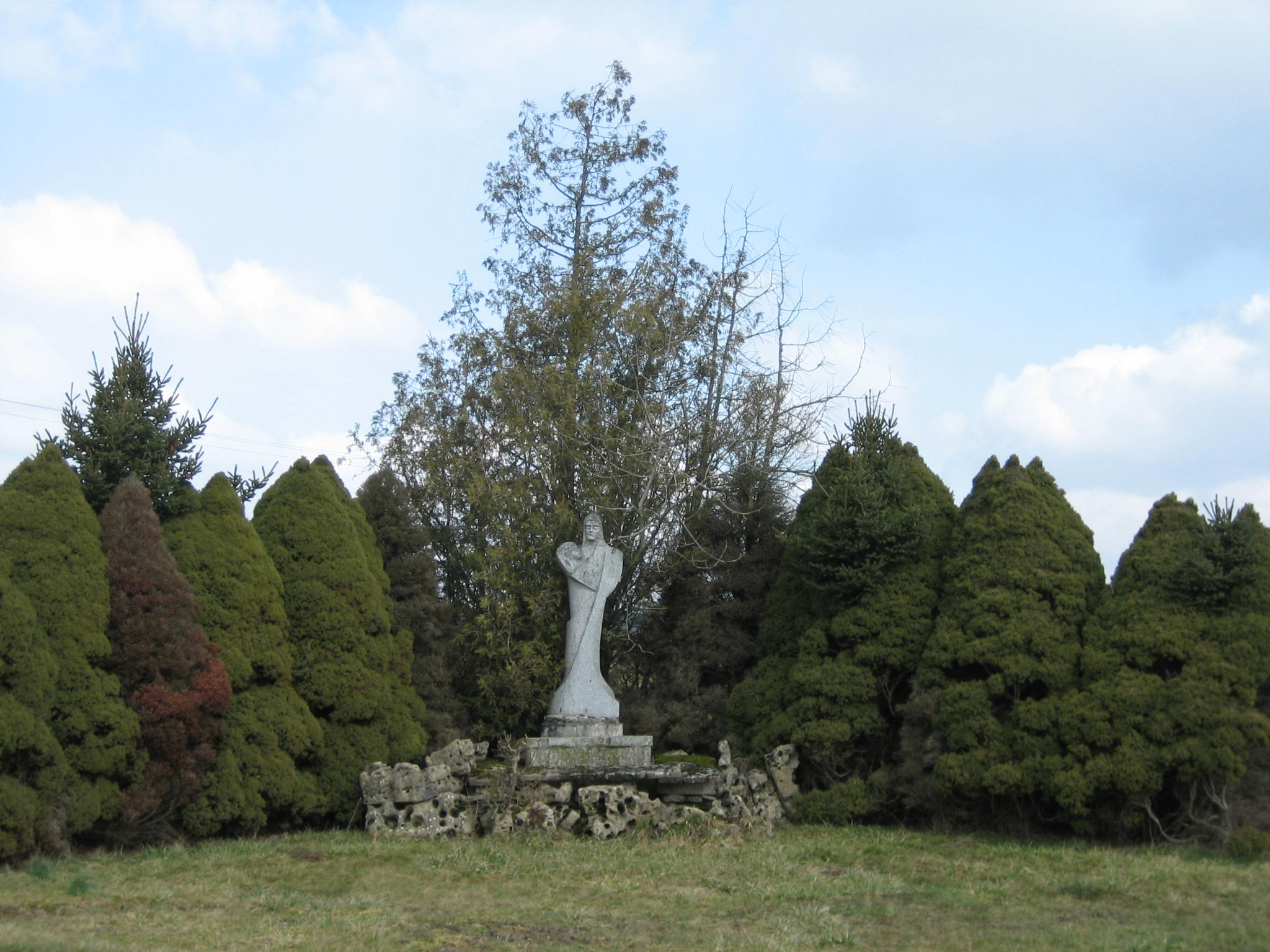
- Statue of the Madonna and child
- Location of Bayecourt
- Location within France Location within Grand Est
- Coordinates: 48°16′02″N 6°29′20″E
- Country: France
- Region: Grand Est
- Department: Vosges
- Arrondissement: Épinal
- Canton: Bruyères
- Intercommunality: CA Épinal

Government
  - Mayor (2020–2026): Gilbert François
- Area^{1}: 6.92 km^{2} (2.67 sq mi)
- Highest elevation: 366 m (1,201 ft)
- Lowest elevation: 307 m (1,007 ft)
- Population (2023): 230
  - Density: 33/km^{2} (86/sq mi)
- Time zone: UTC+01:00 (CET)
  - Summer (DST): UTC+02:00 (CEST)
- INSEE/Postal code: 88040 /88150
- ^{1} French Land Register data, which excludes lakes, ponds, glaciers > 1 km^{2} (0.386 sq mi or 247 acres) and river estuaries.

Bayecourt (French pronunciation: [bɛkuʁ]) is a commune in the Vosges department in Grand Est in northeastern France.

== See also ==
- Communes of the Vosges department
