= Damas-aux-Bois =

- Commune
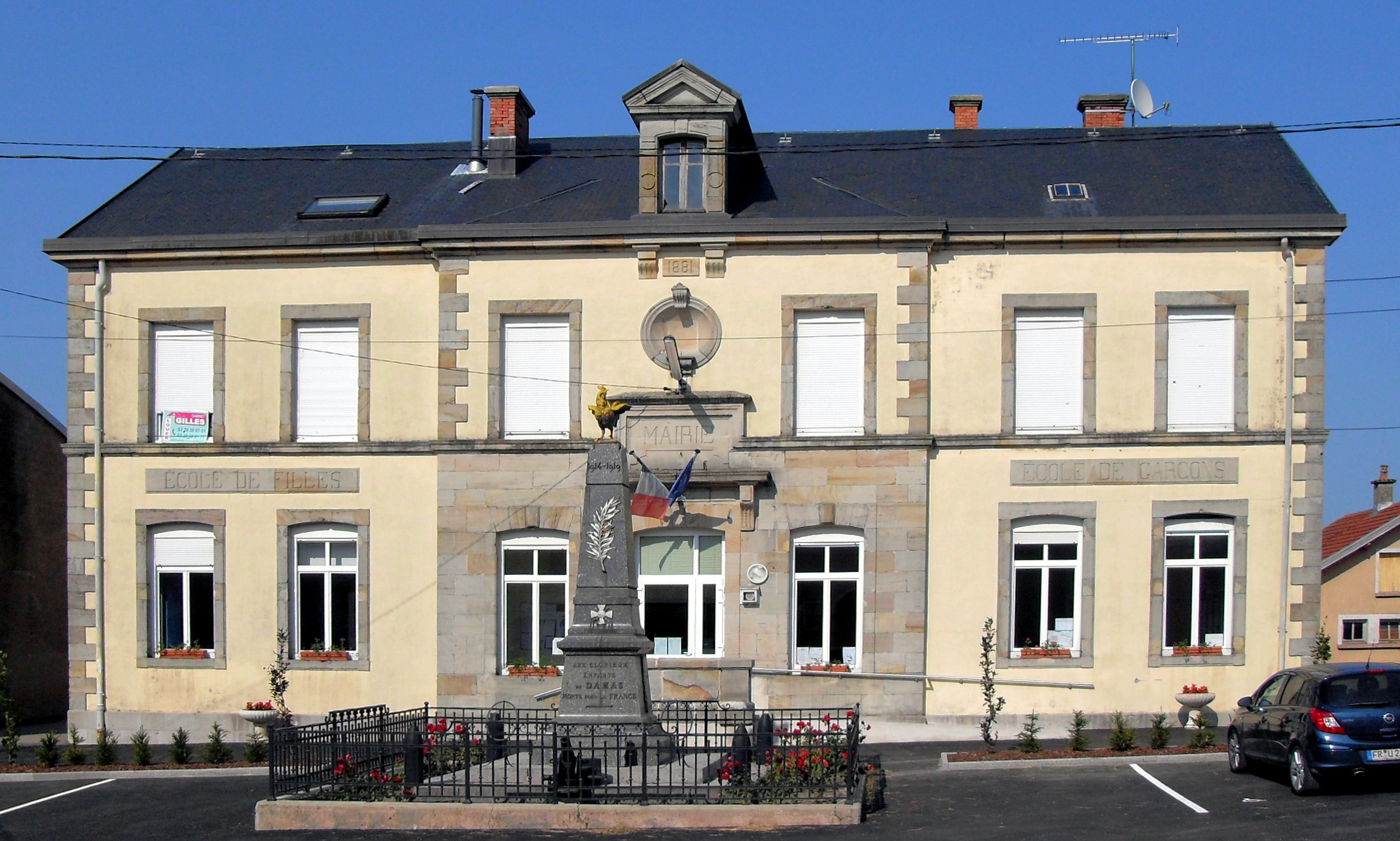
- The town hall in Damas-aux-Bois
- Location of Damas-aux-Bois
- Location within France Location within Grand Est
- Coordinates: 48°23′55″N 6°27′09″E
- Country: France
- Region: Grand Est
- Department: Vosges
- Arrondissement: Épinal
- Canton: Charmes
- Intercommunality: CA Épinal

Government
  - Mayor (2020–2026): Jacques Aubry
- Area^{1}: 29.46 km^{2} (11.37 sq mi)
- Highest elevation: 366 m (1,201 ft)
- Lowest elevation: 279 m (915 ft)
- Population (2023): 273
  - Density: 9.27/km^{2} (24.0/sq mi)
- Time zone: UTC+01:00 (CET)
  - Summer (DST): UTC+02:00 (CEST)
- INSEE/Postal code: 88121 /88330
- ^{1} French Land Register data, which excludes lakes, ponds, glaciers > 1 km^{2} (0.386 sq mi or 247 acres) and river estuaries.

Damas-aux-Bois is a commune in the Vosges department in Grand Est in northeastern France.

== See also ==
- Communes of the Vosges department
