= Zincourt =

- Commune
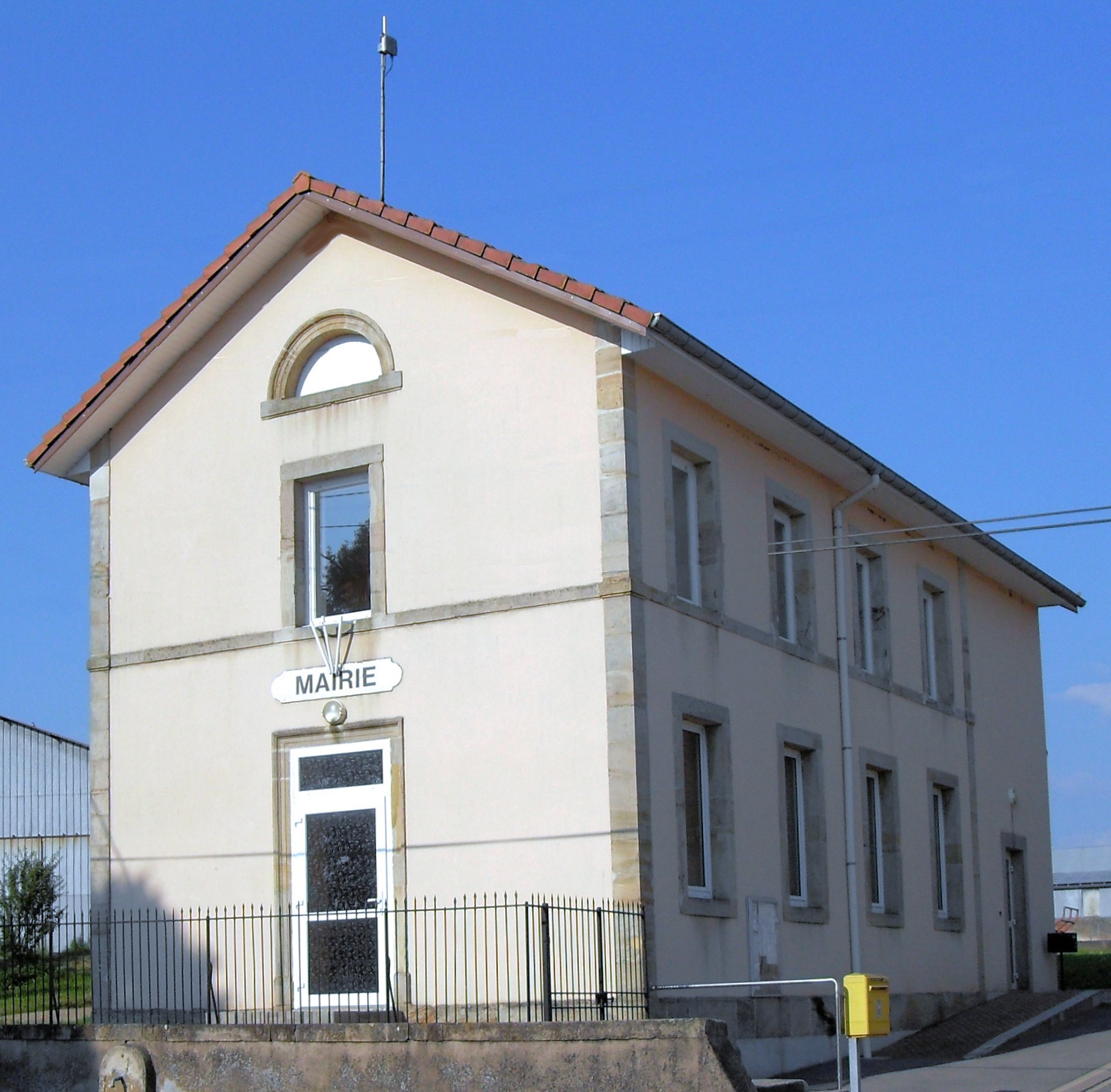
- The town hall in Zincourt
- Location of Zincourt
- Location within France Location within Grand Est
- Coordinates: 48°18′32″N 6°26′25″E
- Country: France
- Region: Grand Est
- Department: Vosges
- Arrondissement: Épinal
- Canton: Bruyères
- Intercommunality: Épinal

Government
  - Mayor (2020–2026): Gilles Crouvisier
- Area^{1}: 4.47 km^{2} (1.73 sq mi)
- Highest elevation: 393 m (1,289 ft)
- Lowest elevation: 305 m (1,001 ft)
- Population (2023): 75
  - Density: 17/km^{2} (43/sq mi)
- Demonym(s): Zincurtiens, Zincurtiennes
- Time zone: UTC+01:00 (CET)
  - Summer (DST): UTC+02:00 (CEST)
- INSEE/Postal code: 88532 /88330
- ^{1} French Land Register data, which excludes lakes, ponds, glaciers > 1 km^{2} (0.386 sq mi or 247 acres) and river estuaries.

Zincourt (French pronunciation: [zɛ̃kuʁ]) is a commune in the Vosges department in Grand Est in northeastern France.

== Population ==
Historical population

Year	Pop.	±% p.a.
1793	147	—
1821	157	+0.24%
1846	171	+0.34%
1876	161	−0.20%
1901	108	−1.58%
1926	103	−0.19%
1946	87	−0.84%
1962	78	−0.68%
1968	76	−0.43%

Year	Pop.	±% p.a.
1975	71	−0.97%
1982	92	+3.77%
1990	90	−0.27%
1999	77	−1.72%
2007	83	+0.94%
2012	88	+1.18%
2017	83	−1.16%
2023	75	−1.68%

Source: EHESS and INSEE

== See also ==
- Communes of the Vosges department
