= Villoncourt =

- Commune
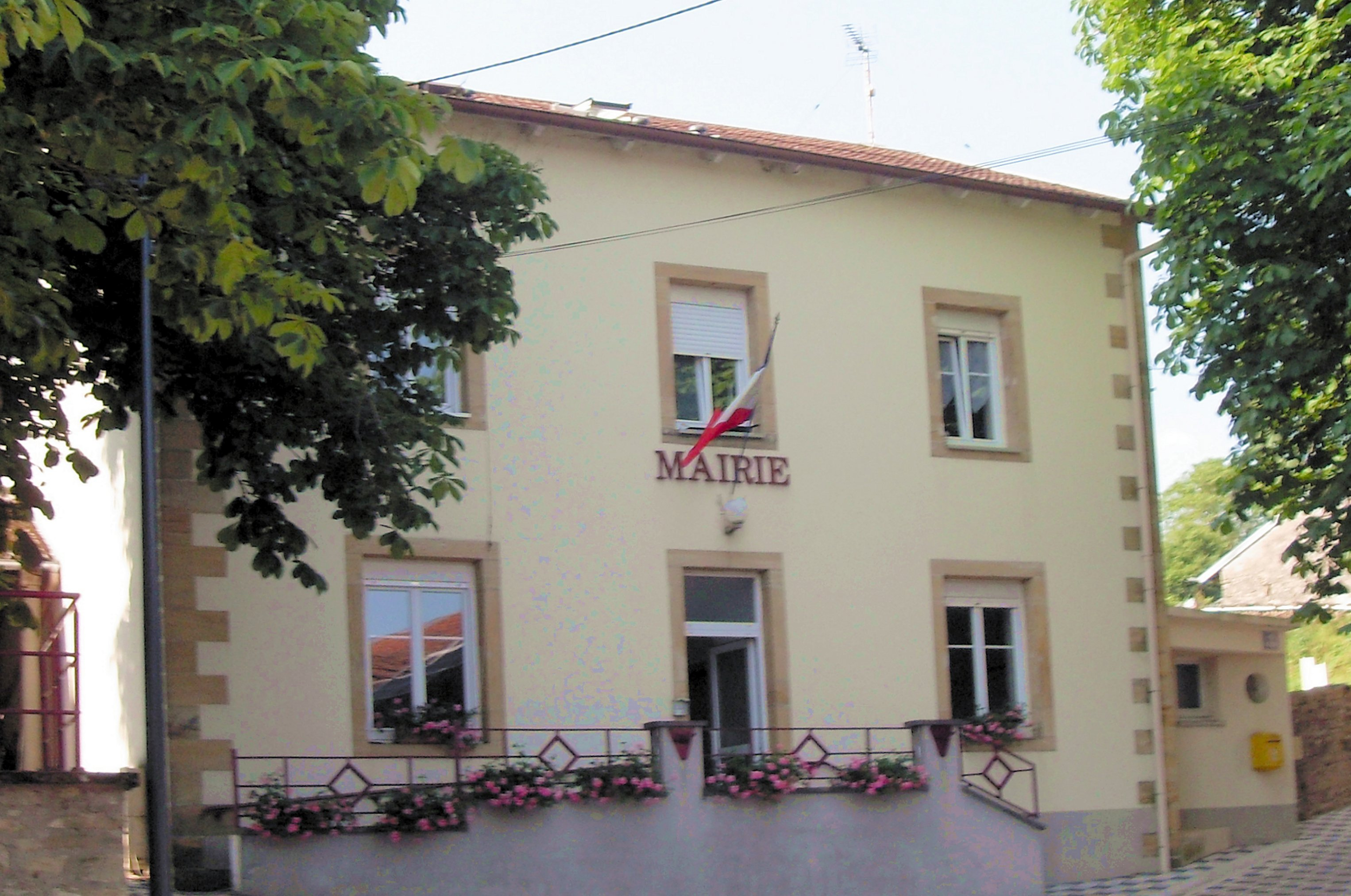
- The town hall in Villoncourt
- Location of Villoncourt
- Location within France Location within Grand Est
- Coordinates: 48°15′49″N 6°30′42″E
- Country: France
- Region: Grand Est
- Department: Vosges
- Arrondissement: Épinal
- Canton: Bruyères
- Intercommunality: CA Épinal

Government
  - Mayor (2020–2026): Daniel Hueber
- Area^{1}: 6.4 km^{2} (2.5 sq mi)
- Highest elevation: 362 m (1,188 ft)
- Lowest elevation: 314 m (1,030 ft)
- Population (2023): 101
  - Density: 16/km^{2} (41/sq mi)
- Time zone: UTC+01:00 (CET)
  - Summer (DST): UTC+02:00 (CEST)
- INSEE/Postal code: 88509 /88150
- ^{1} French Land Register data, which excludes lakes, ponds, glaciers > 1 km^{2} (0.386 sq mi or 247 acres) and river estuaries.

Villoncourt (French pronunciation: [vilɔ̃kuʁ]) is a commune in the Vosges department in Grand Est in northeastern France.

== See also ==
- Communes of the Vosges department
