= Domèvre-sur-Durbion =

- Commune
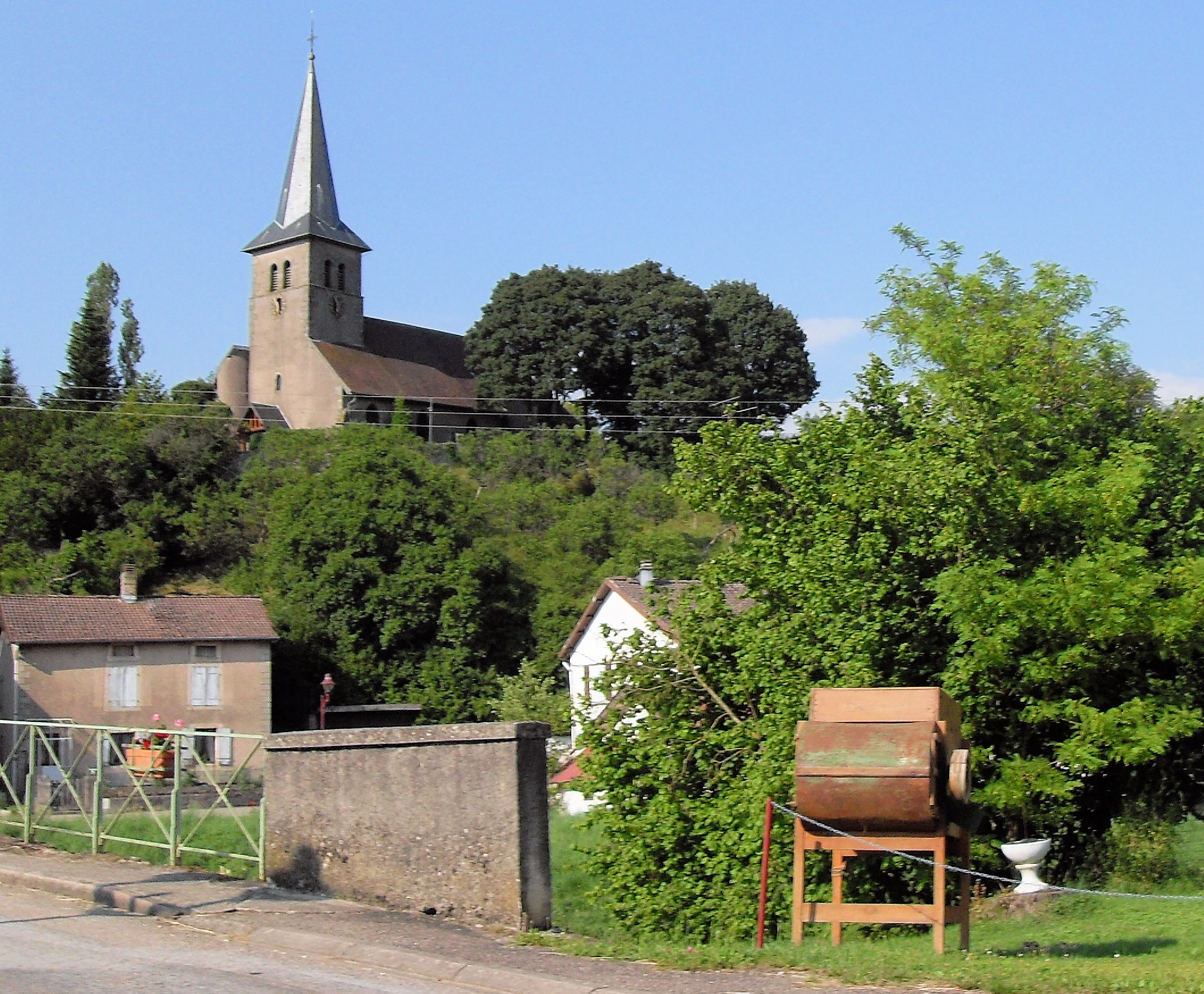
- The church and surroundings in Domèvre-sur-Durbion
- Location of Domèvre-sur-Durbion
- Location within France Location within Grand Est
- Coordinates: 48°17′10″N 6°28′17″E
- Country: France
- Region: Grand Est
- Department: Vosges
- Arrondissement: Épinal
- Canton: Bruyères
- Intercommunality: CA Épinal

Government
  - Mayor (2020–2026): Bernard Morel
- Area^{1}: 12.51 km^{2} (4.83 sq mi)
- Elevation: 331 m (1,086 ft)
- Highest elevation: 365 m (1,198 ft)
- Lowest elevation: 299 m (981 ft)
- Population (2023): 267
  - Density: 21.3/km^{2} (55.3/sq mi)
- Time zone: UTC+01:00 (CET)
  - Summer (DST): UTC+02:00 (CEST)
- INSEE/Postal code: 88143 /88330
- ^{1} French Land Register data, which excludes lakes, ponds, glaciers > 1 km^{2} (0.386 sq mi or 247 acres) and river estuaries.

Domèvre-sur-Durbion (French pronunciation: [dɔmɛvʁ syʁ dyʁbjɔ̃], lit. 'Domèvre on Durbion') is a commune in the Vosges department in Grand Est in northeastern France.

== See also ==
- Communes of the Vosges department
