= Igney, Vosges =

Igney
- Commune
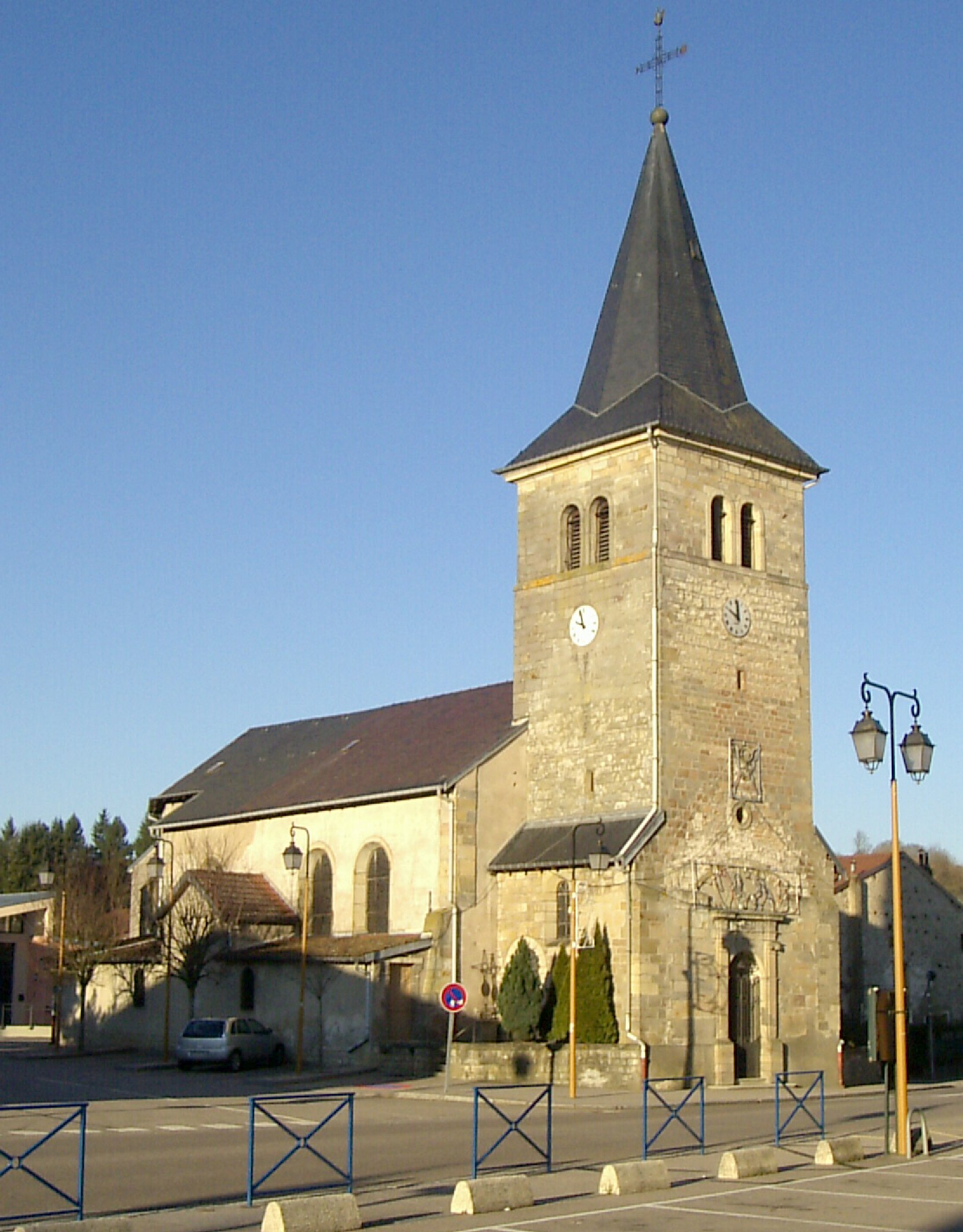
- Church of Saint-Nicolas

- Coat of arms
- Location of Igney
- Location within France Location within Grand Est
- Coordinates: 48°16′32″N 6°23′46″E
- Country: France
- Region: Grand Est
- Department: Vosges
- Arrondissement: Épinal
- Canton: Golbey
- Intercommunality: Épinal

Government
  - Mayor (2020–2026): Sandrine Queyreyre
- Area^{1}: 7.66 km^{2} (2.96 sq mi)
- Elevation: 310 m (1,020 ft)
- Highest elevation: 373 m (1,224 ft)
- Lowest elevation: 286 m (938 ft)
- Population (2023): 1,133
  - Density: 148/km^{2} (383/sq mi)
- Time zone: UTC+01:00 (CET)
  - Summer (DST): UTC+02:00 (CEST)
- INSEE/Postal code: 88247 /88150
- ^{1} French Land Register data, which excludes lakes, ponds, glaciers > 1 km^{2} (0.386 sq mi or 247 acres) and river estuaries.

Igney (French pronunciation: [iɲɛ]) is a commune in the Vosges department in Grand Est in northeastern France.

== Population ==
Historical population
Year	Pop.	±% p.a.
1968	1,310	—
1975	1,307	−0.03%
1982	1,171	−1.56%
1990	1,075	−1.06%
1999	1,090	+0.15%
2007	1,112	+0.25%
2012	1,191	+1.38%
2017	1,168	−0.39%
2023	1,133	−0.51%
Source: INSEE

== See also ==
- Communes of the Vosges department
