= Chavelot =

- Commune
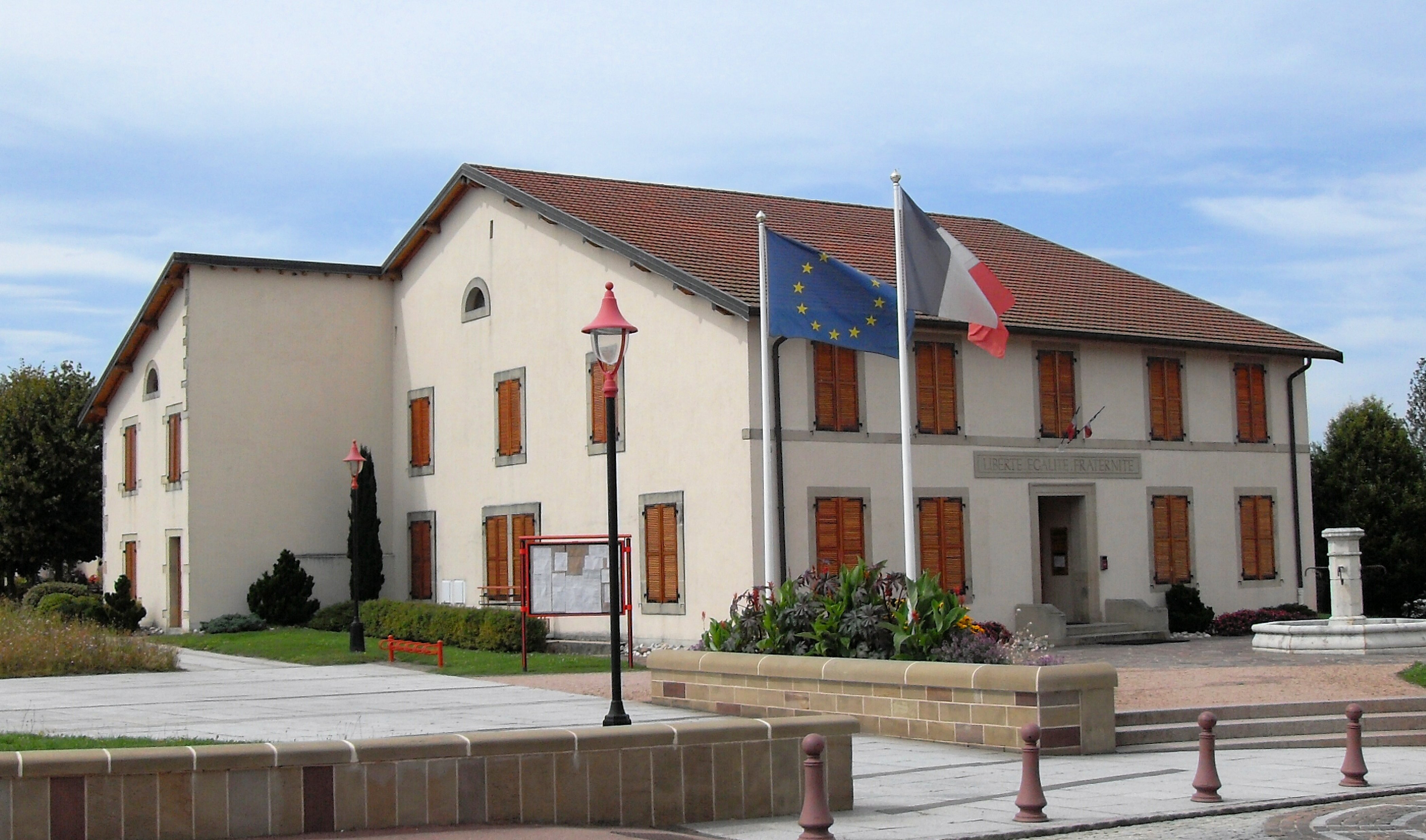
- The town hall in Chavelot
- Location of Chavelot
- Location within France Location within Grand Est
- Coordinates: 48°14′17″N 6°26′15″E
- Country: France
- Region: Grand Est
- Department: Vosges
- Arrondissement: Épinal
- Canton: Golbey
- Intercommunality: CA Épinal

Government
  - Mayor (2020–2026): Francis Allain
- Area^{1}: 6.16 km^{2} (2.38 sq mi)
- Highest elevation: 355 m (1,165 ft)
- Lowest elevation: 306 m (1,004 ft)
- Population (2023): 1,376
  - Density: 223/km^{2} (579/sq mi)
- Time zone: UTC+01:00 (CET)
  - Summer (DST): UTC+02:00 (CEST)
- INSEE/Postal code: 88099 /88150
- ^{1} French Land Register data, which excludes lakes, ponds, glaciers > 1 km^{2} (0.386 sq mi or 247 acres) and river estuaries.

Chavelot (French pronunciation: [ʃavlo]) is a commune in the Vosges department in Grand Est in northeastern France.

== See also ==
- Communes of the Vosges department
