= Vincey =

- Commune
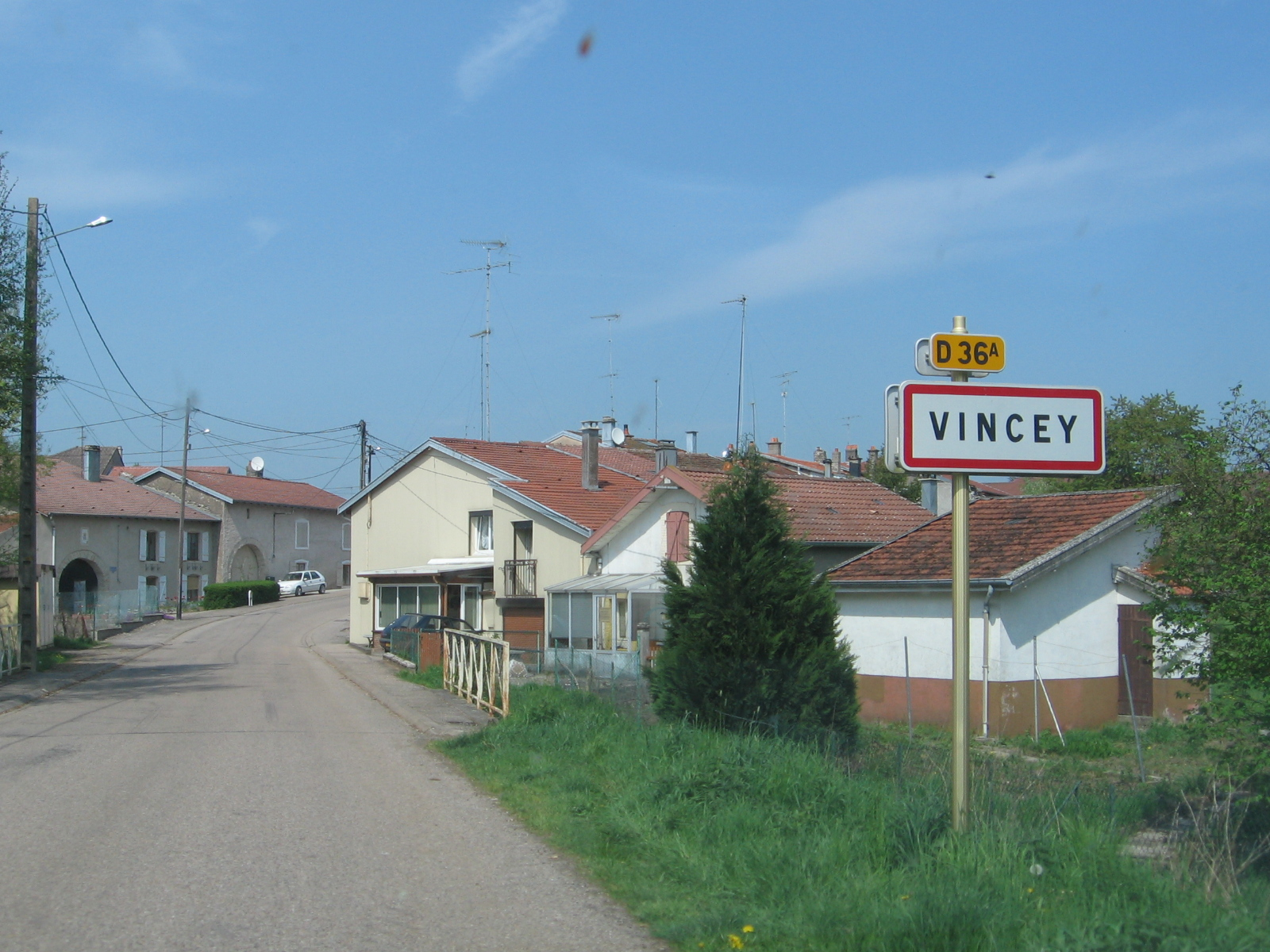
- The road into Vincey

- Coat of arms
- Location of Vincey
- Location within France Location within Grand Est
- Coordinates: 48°20′15″N 6°19′46″E
- Country: France
- Region: Grand Est
- Department: Vosges
- Arrondissement: Épinal
- Canton: Charmes
- Intercommunality: CA Épinal

Government
  - Mayor (2020–2026): Thierry Gaillot
- Area^{1}: 12.81 km^{2} (4.95 sq mi)
- Elevation: 280 m (920 ft)
- Highest elevation: 382 m (1,253 ft)
- Lowest elevation: 272 m (892 ft)
- Population (2023): 2,053
  - Density: 160.3/km^{2} (415.1/sq mi)
- Time zone: UTC+01:00 (CET)
  - Summer (DST): UTC+02:00 (CEST)
- INSEE/Postal code: 88513 /88450
- Website: www.vincey.fr
- ^{1} French Land Register data, which excludes lakes, ponds, glaciers > 1 km^{2} (0.386 sq mi or 247 acres) and river estuaries.

Vincey (French pronunciation: [vɛ̃sɛ]) is a commune in the Vosges department in Grand Est in northeastern France.

== Population ==
Historical population
Year	Pop.	±% p.a.
1968	2,094	—
1975	2,284	+1.25%
1982	2,205	−0.50%
1990	2,198	−0.04%
1999	2,159	−0.20%
2007	2,276	+0.66%
2012	2,244	−0.28%
2017	2,181	−0.57%
2023	2,053	−1.00%
Source: INSEE

== See also ==
- Communes of the Vosges department
