= Vaxoncourt =

- Commune
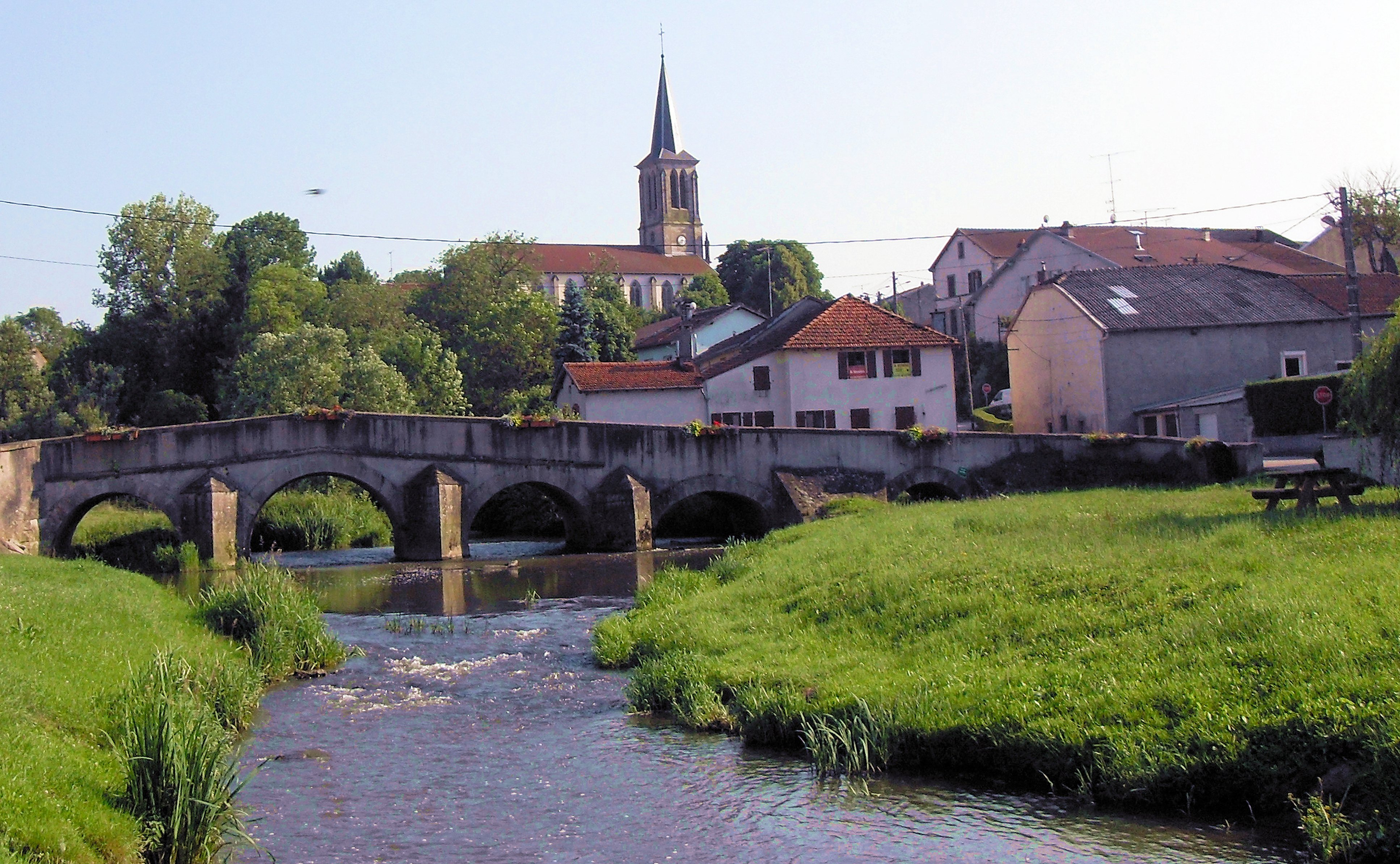
- A general view of Vaxoncourt
- Location of Vaxoncourt
- Location within France Location within Grand Est
- Coordinates: 48°17′30″N 6°24′44″E
- Country: France
- Region: Grand Est
- Department: Vosges
- Arrondissement: Épinal
- Canton: Golbey
- Intercommunality: CA Épinal

Government
  - Mayor (2020–2026): Frédéric Dulot
- Area^{1}: 8.43 km^{2} (3.25 sq mi)
- Elevation: 300 m (980 ft)
- Highest elevation: 367 m (1,204 ft)
- Lowest elevation: 286 m (938 ft)
- Population (2023): 507
  - Density: 60.1/km^{2} (156/sq mi)
- Time zone: UTC+01:00 (CET)
  - Summer (DST): UTC+02:00 (CEST)
- INSEE/Postal code: 88497 /88330
- ^{1} French Land Register data, which excludes lakes, ponds, glaciers > 1 km^{2} (0.386 sq mi or 247 acres) and river estuaries.

Vaxoncourt (French pronunciation: [vaksɔ̃kuʁ]) is a commune in the Vosges department in Grand Est in northeastern France.

== See also ==
- Communes of the Vosges department
