= Badménil-aux-Bois =

- Commune
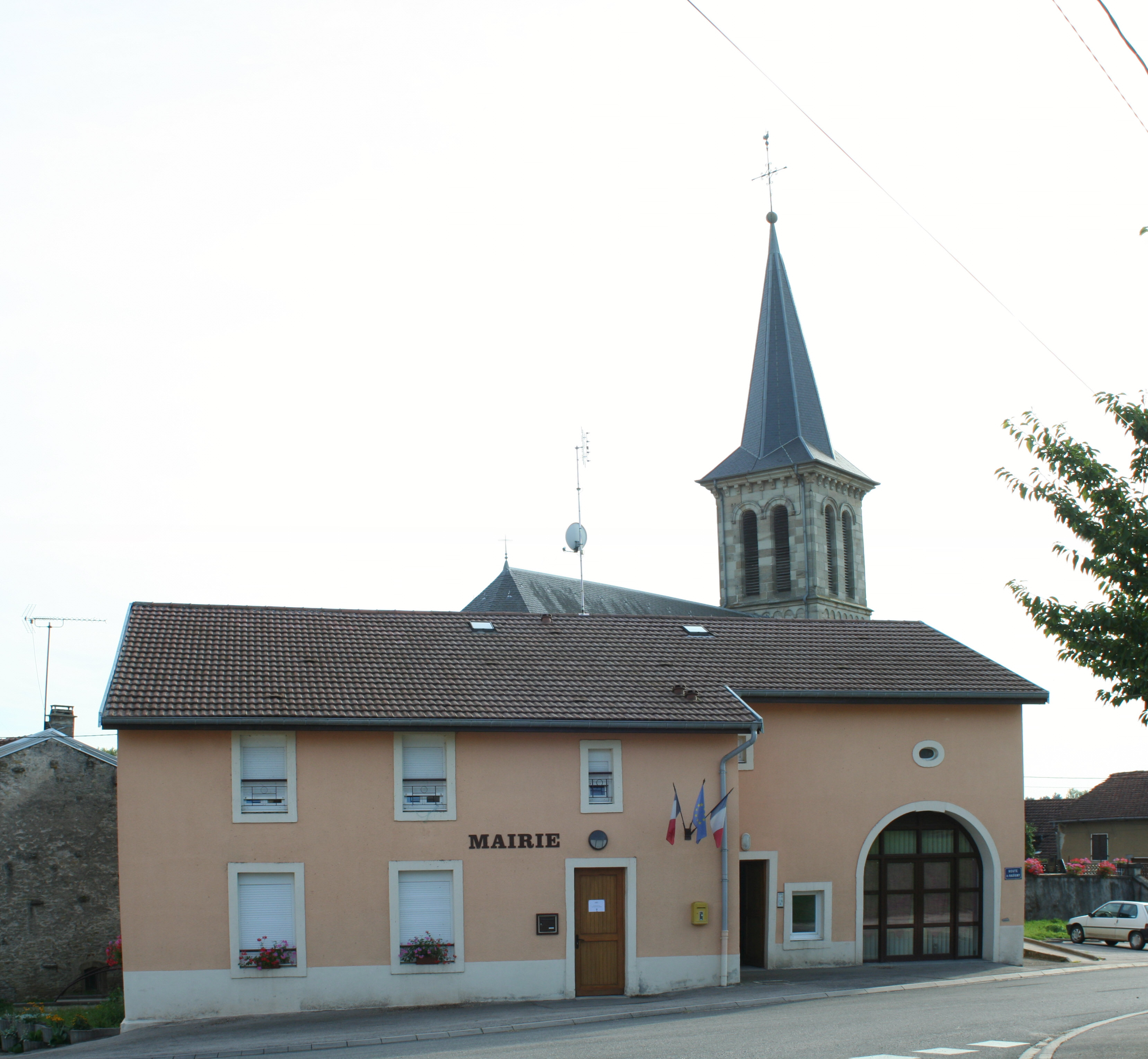
- The town hall in Badménil-aux-Bois

- Coat of arms
- Location of Badménil-aux-Bois
- Location within France Location within Grand Est
- Coordinates: 48°18′11″N 6°31′12″E
- Country: France
- Region: Grand Est
- Department: Vosges
- Arrondissement: Épinal
- Canton: Bruyères
- Intercommunality: CA Épinal

Government
  - Mayor (2020–2026): Thierry Euriat
- Area^{1}: 9.14 km^{2} (3.53 sq mi)
- Highest elevation: 367 m (1,204 ft)
- Lowest elevation: 314 m (1,030 ft)
- Population (2023): 135
  - Density: 14.8/km^{2} (38.3/sq mi)
- Time zone: UTC+01:00 (CET)
  - Summer (DST): UTC+02:00 (CEST)
- INSEE/Postal code: 88027 /88330
- ^{1} French Land Register data, which excludes lakes, ponds, glaciers > 1 km^{2} (0.386 sq mi or 247 acres) and river estuaries.

Badménil-aux-Bois (French pronunciation: [badmenil o bwa]) is a commune in the Vosges department in Grand Est in northeastern France.

== See also ==
- Communes of the Vosges department
