= Thaon-les-Vosges (delegated commune) =

- Part of Thaon-les-Vosges
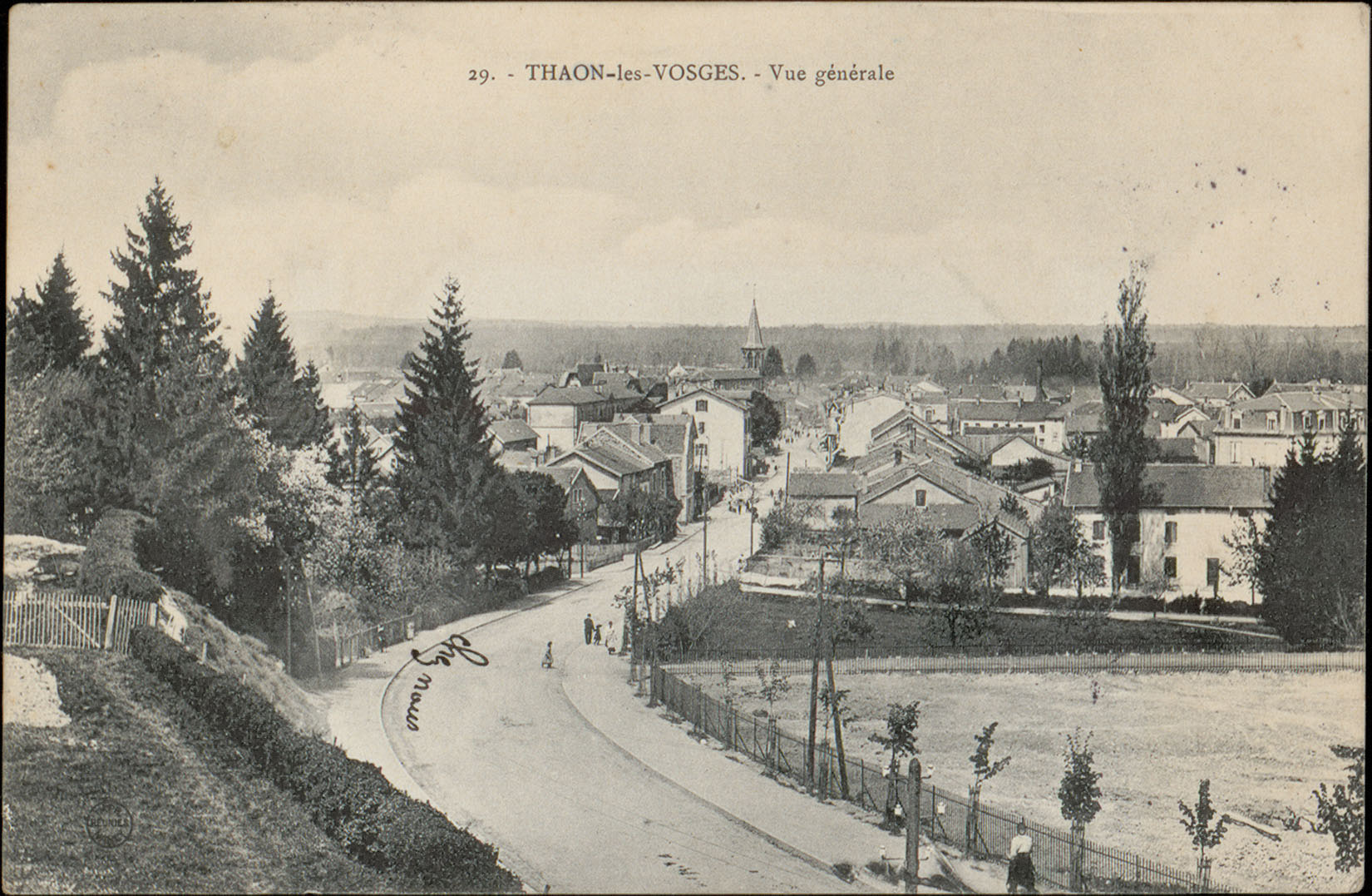

- Coat of arms
- Location of Thaon-les-Vosges
- Location within France Location within Grand Est
- Coordinates: 48°15′05″N 6°25′15″E
- Country: France
- Region: Grand Est
- Department: Vosges
- Arrondissement: Épinal
- Canton: Golbey
- Commune: Thaon-les-Vosges
- Area^{1}: 11.7 km^{2} (4.5 sq mi)
- Highest elevation: 377 m (1,237 ft)
- Lowest elevation: 296 m (971 ft)
- Population (2022): 7,296
  - Density: 624/km^{2} (1,620/sq mi)
- Time zone: UTC+01:00 (CET)
  - Summer (DST): UTC+02:00 (CEST)
- Postal code: 88150
- Website: www.thaon-les-vosges.com
- ^{1} French Land Register data, which excludes lakes, ponds, glaciers > 1 km^{2} (0.386 sq mi or 247 acres) and river estuaries.

Thaon-les-Vosges (French pronunciation: [taɔ̃ le voʒ]) is a former commune in the Vosges department in northeastern France. On 1 January 2016, it was merged into the new commune Capavenir Vosges, which was renamed Thaon-les-Vosges effective 2022.

== See also ==
- Communes of the Vosges department
