= Frizon =

- Commune
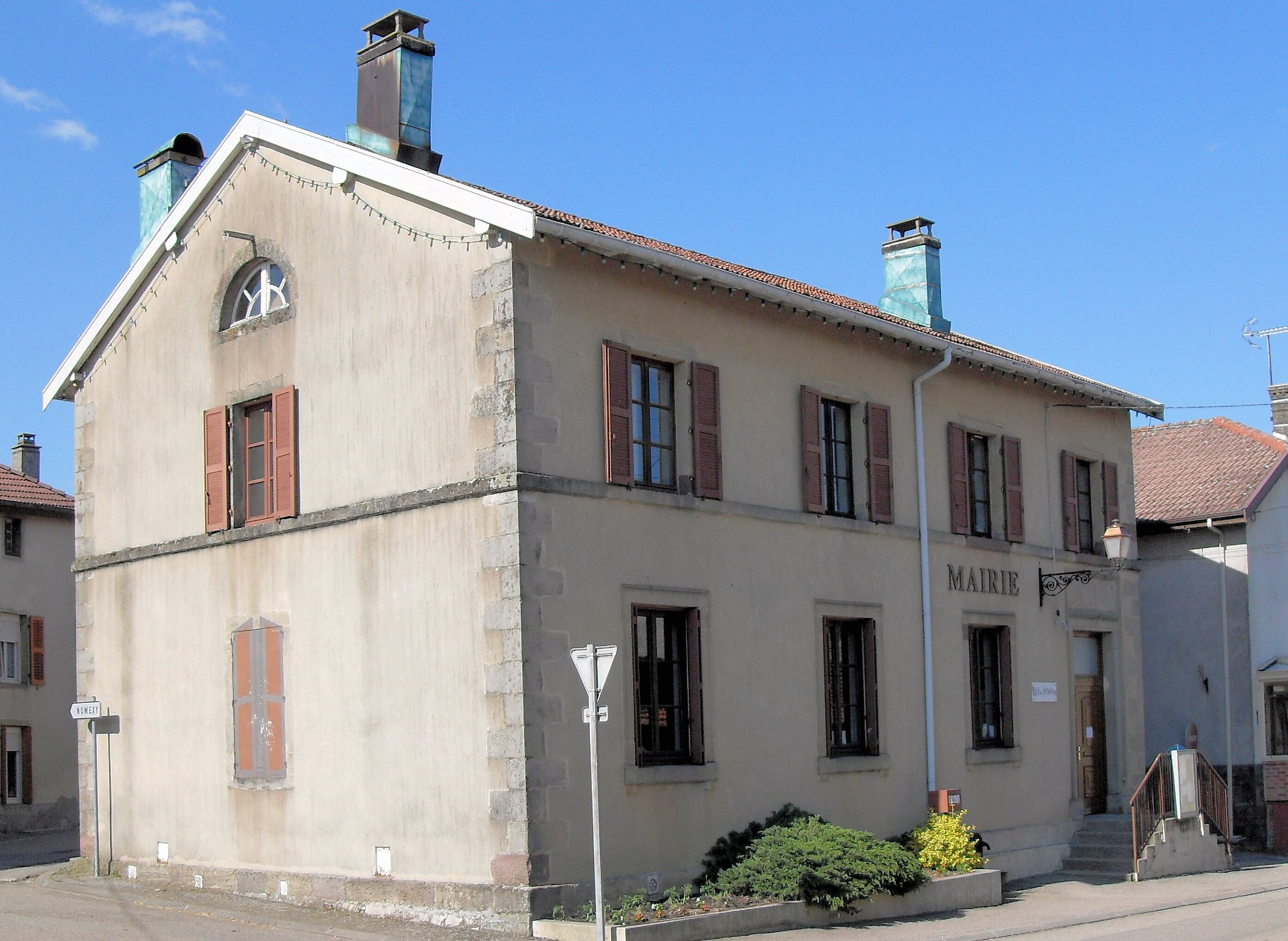
- The town hall in Frizon

- Coat of arms
- Location of Frizon
- Location within France Location within Grand Est
- Coordinates: 48°17′11″N 6°21′52″E
- Country: France
- Region: Grand Est
- Department: Vosges
- Arrondissement: Épinal
- Canton: Golbey
- Intercommunality: CA Épinal

Government
  - Mayor (2020–2026): Luc Bedin
- Area^{1}: 11.75 km^{2} (4.54 sq mi)
- Highest elevation: 381 m (1,250 ft)
- Lowest elevation: 297 m (974 ft)
- Population (2023): 485
  - Density: 41.3/km^{2} (107/sq mi)
- Time zone: UTC+01:00 (CET)
  - Summer (DST): UTC+02:00 (CEST)
- INSEE/Postal code: 88190 /88440
- ^{1} French Land Register data, which excludes lakes, ponds, glaciers > 1 km^{2} (0.386 sq mi or 247 acres) and river estuaries.

Frizon (French pronunciation: [fʁizɔ̃]) is a commune in the Vosges department in Grand Est in northeastern France.

== See also ==
- Communes of the Vosges department
