= Châtel-sur-Moselle =

- Commune
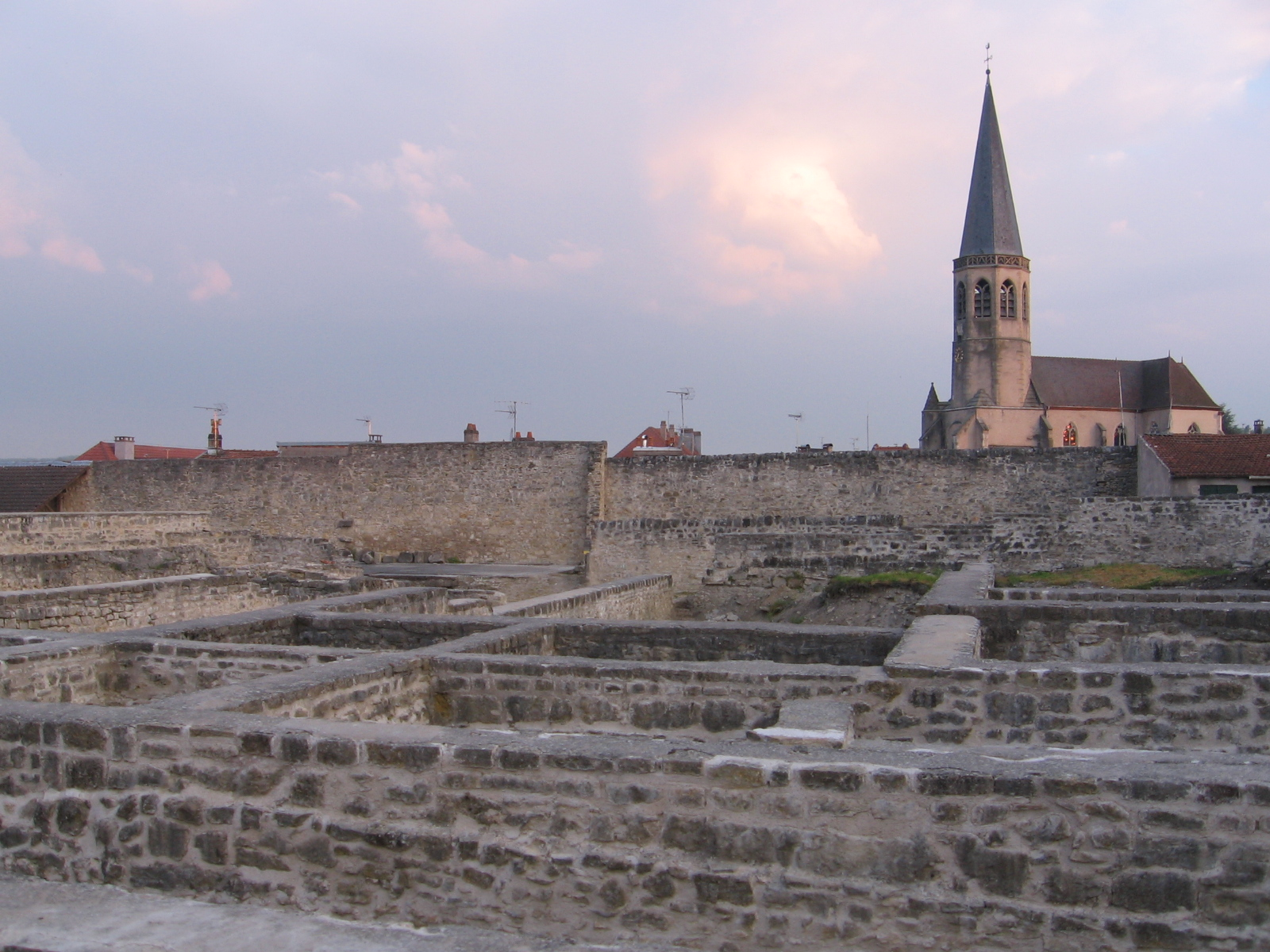
- Ruins of the fortress and the church

- Flag Coat of arms
- Location of Châtel-sur-Moselle
- Location within France Location within Grand Est
- Coordinates: 48°18′54″N 6°23′37″E
- Country: France
- Region: Grand Est
- Department: Vosges
- Arrondissement: Épinal
- Canton: Charmes
- Intercommunality: CA Épinal

Government
  - Mayor (2020–2026): Françoise Piaget
- Area^{1}: 11.86 km^{2} (4.58 sq mi)
- Highest elevation: 393 m (1,289 ft)
- Lowest elevation: 280 m (920 ft)
- Population (2023): 1,723
  - Density: 145.3/km^{2} (376.3/sq mi)
- Time zone: UTC+01:00 (CET)
  - Summer (DST): UTC+02:00 (CEST)
- INSEE/Postal code: 88094 /88330
- ^{1} French Land Register data, which excludes lakes, ponds, glaciers > 1 km^{2} (0.386 sq mi or 247 acres) and river estuaries.

Châtel-sur-Moselle (French pronunciation: [ʃɑtɛl syʁ mɔzɛl], literally Châtel on Moselle) is a commune in the Vosges department in Grand Est in northeastern France.

== History ==
With its commanding position alongside the River Moselle, located at the junction of the three main Roman roads and at the end of the Trans-Burgundy highway, Châtel played a strategic role throughout its long history up to 1940-44 during World War II.

From the year 1072 until 1373, it belonged to the Earls of Vaudémont, related to the House of Lorraine. It then became the property of a most prominent Burgundian family, the Lords of Neufchâtel, after the wedding of daughter Alix de Vaudémont with Thiebaut VII of Neufchâtel-Burgundy.

It became the centre of a wide territory which supported the Burgundian cause for years. In 1544, the House of Lorraine gained possession of Châtel, thus ending a legal wrangling between Elisabeth of Neufchâtel's heirs. Then the fortress stood up against the French invasion during the Thirty Years' War and changed hands nine times.

It was finally completely dismantled in 1671 on Louis the XIV's orders.

Built on the edge of a jutting limestone promontory alongside the Mosel River, surrounded by dry ditches 63 yards (58 m) wide, the castle dominated the medieval town and its surrounding walls with its twelve towers and two main gates.

The first structure, built during the 11th and 12th century, showed a single rectangular keep. It was enlarged during the 13th century and further extended in the 15th century to become one of the most important places in the area, with a unique attempt to match the evolving needs of modern artillery.

Two curtain walls, with a total combined length of about one mile (1.4 km), comprised not less than 22 towers. A sophisticated network of storerooms and galleries completed the fortress' defenses and allowed communication between the castle, the town downwards, and the river banks.

== See also ==
- Communes of the Vosges department
