= Gigney =

- Commune
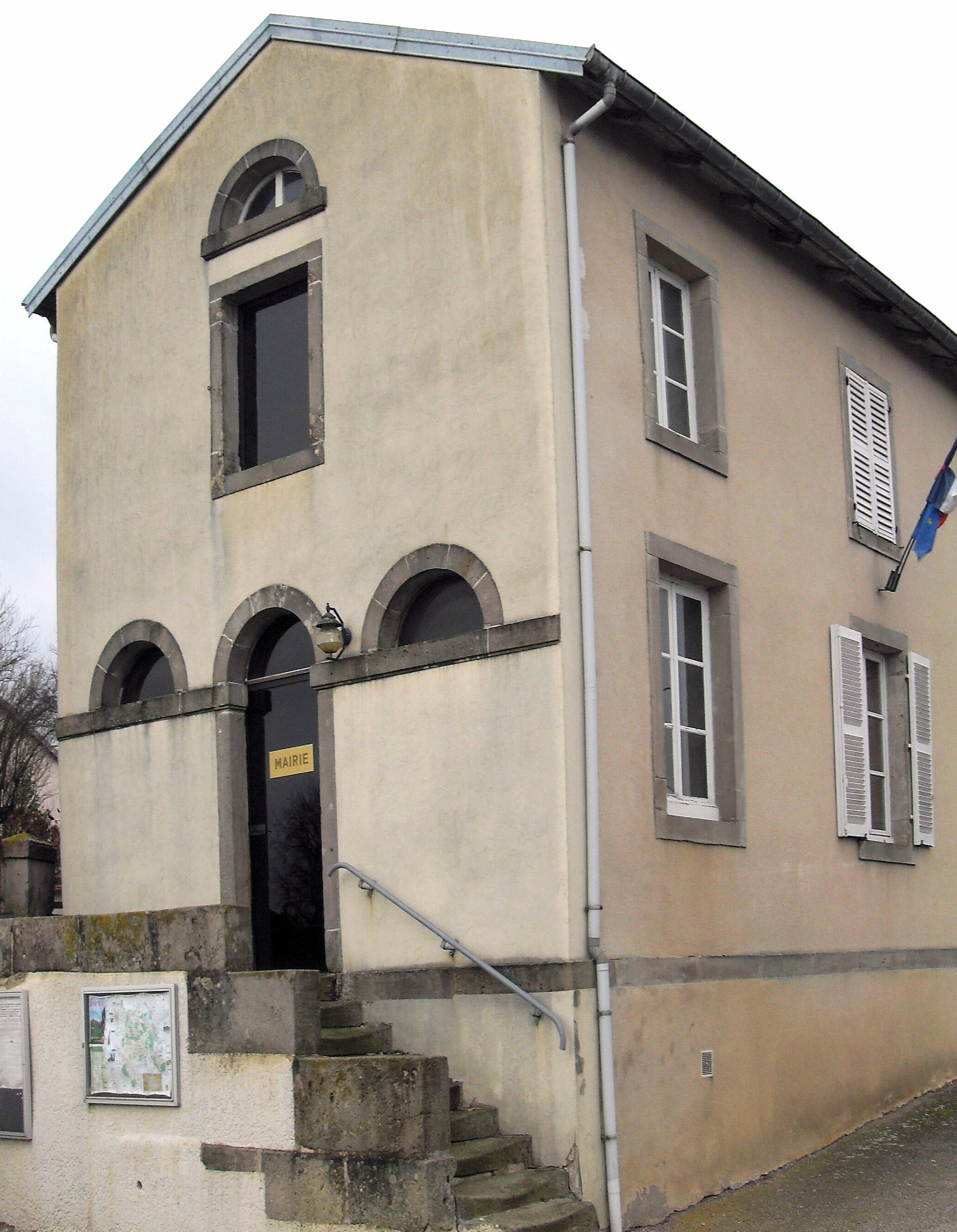
- The town hall in Gigney
- Location of Gigney
- Location within France Location within Grand Est
- Coordinates: 48°13′51″N 6°20′21″E
- Country: France
- Region: Grand Est
- Department: Vosges
- Arrondissement: Épinal
- Canton: Golbey
- Intercommunality: CA Épinal

Government
  - Mayor (2020–2026): Jérôme Thomas
- Area^{1}: 5.09 km^{2} (1.97 sq mi)
- Highest elevation: 395 m (1,296 ft)
- Lowest elevation: 327 m (1,073 ft)
- Population (2023): 58
  - Density: 11/km^{2} (30/sq mi)
- Time zone: UTC+01:00 (CET)
  - Summer (DST): UTC+02:00 (CEST)
- INSEE/Postal code: 88200 /88390
- ^{1} French Land Register data, which excludes lakes, ponds, glaciers > 1 km^{2} (0.386 sq mi or 247 acres) and river estuaries.

Gigney (French pronunciation: [ʒiɲɛ]) is a commune in the Vosges department in Grand Est in northeastern France.

== See also ==
- Communes of the Vosges department
