= Canton of Golbey =

Coordinates: 48.20°N 6.44°E

The canton of Golbey is an administrative division of the Vosges department, in northeastern France. It was created at the French canton reorganisation which came into effect in March 2015. Its seat is in Golbey.

It consists of the following communes:

1. Chavelot
2. Darnieulles
3. Domèvre-sur-Avière
4. Fomerey
5. Frizon
6. Gigney
7. Golbey
8. Igney
9. Mazeley
10. Thaon-les-Vosges
11. Uxegney
12. Vaxoncourt
