= Association of the Mynes and southern Upper Vosges communes =

The Association of the Mynes and southern Upper Vosges communes (French: Communauté de communes des Mynes et Hautes-Vosges du sud) is a former administrative association of communes in the Vosges département of eastern France and in the region of Lorraine. It was merged into the new Communauté de communes des Ballons des Hautes-Vosges in January 2013.

Created in 2006, the association had its administrative offices at Le Thillot.

The association was originally created under the name Association of Rupt Valley and Le Tillot communes ( (French: Communauté de communes du Val de Rupt et Thillot). It was rechristened with its present name three months later, in March 2007, in order to avoid privileging those member communes whose names had originally featured expressly within the association's name.

== Member communes ==
The Communauté de communes comprised the following communes:

1. Ferdrupt
2. Le Ménil
3. Le Thillot
4. Ramonchamp
5. Rupt-sur-Moselle

== Responsibilities ==
The association has by the agreement of the member communes taken powers and competences in the following policy areas:

- Collection of household waste and recyclables
- Processing of household waste and recyclables
- Establishment, maintenance and development of zones for industrial, commercial, tertiary sector, artisanal or tourism purposes
- Cultural and related social activities
- Sports
- Financial reserves
- Home improvements programme (amélioration de l'habitat / OPAH)
- Bulk purchasing on behalf of member communes
