= Fresse-sur-Moselle =

- Commune
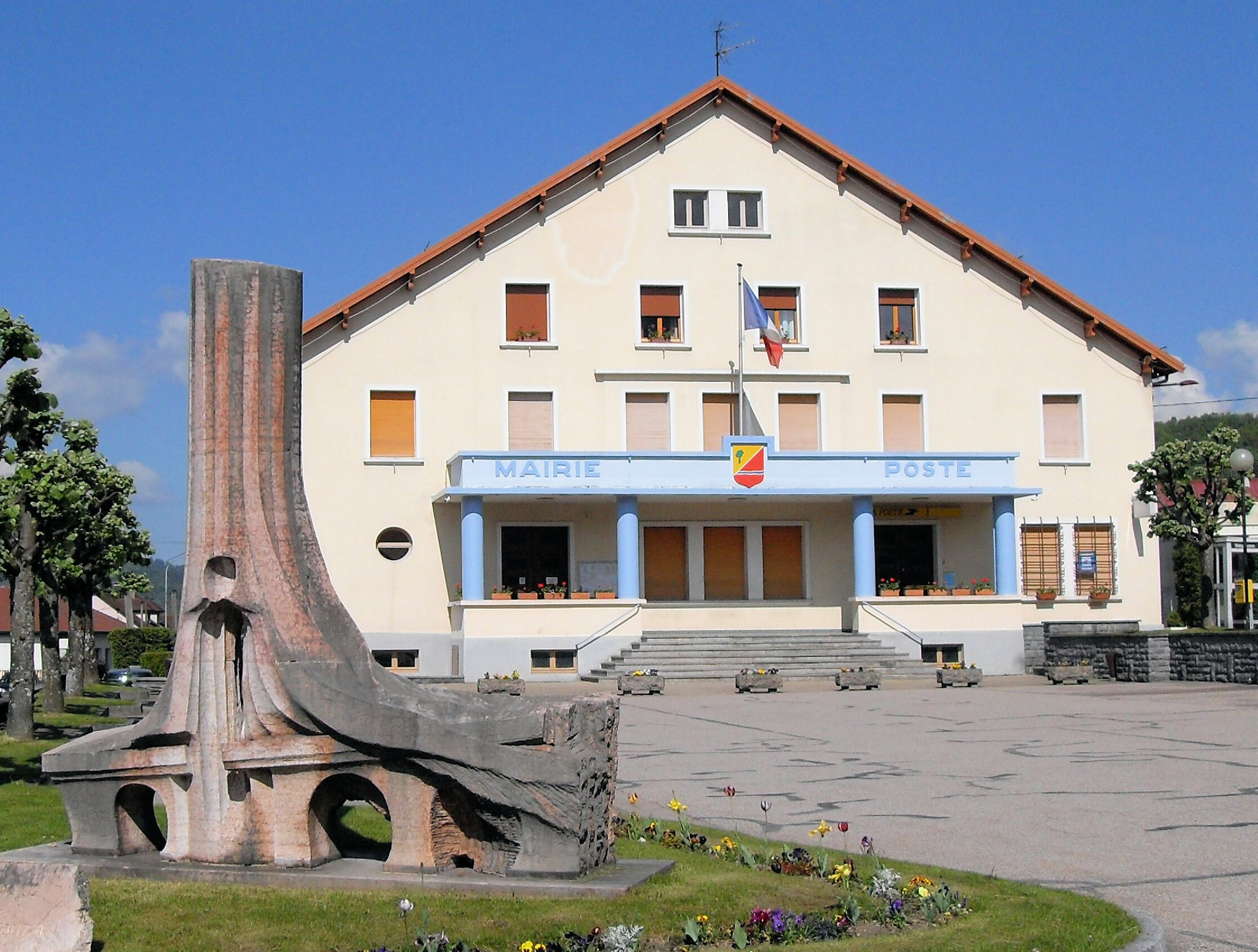
- The town hall and post office in Fresse-sur-Moselle

- Coat of arms
- Location of Fresse-sur-Moselle
- Location within France Location within Grand Est
- Coordinates: 47°52′36″N 6°47′17″E
- Country: France
- Region: Grand Est
- Department: Vosges
- Arrondissement: Épinal
- Canton: Le Thillot
- Intercommunality: CC Ballons des Hautes-Vosges

Government
  - Mayor (2020–2026): Dominique Peduzzi
- Area^{1}: 18.41 km^{2} (7.11 sq mi)
- Highest elevation: 1,190 m (3,900 ft)
- Lowest elevation: 494 m (1,621 ft)
- Population (2023): 1,662
  - Density: 90.28/km^{2} (233.8/sq mi)
- Time zone: UTC+01:00 (CET)
  - Summer (DST): UTC+02:00 (CEST)
- INSEE/Postal code: 88188 /88160
- ^{1} French Land Register data, which excludes lakes, ponds, glaciers > 1 km^{2} (0.386 sq mi or 247 acres) and river estuaries.

Fresse-sur-Moselle (French pronunciation: [fʁɛs syʁ mɔzɛl], literally Fresse on Moselle) is a commune in the Vosges department of Grand Est in northeastern France. The name Moselle refers to the river Moselle that bypasses. In the left of Fresse sur Moselle is situated Le Thillot and in the right of Fresse of Moselle is situated Bussang.In the top is situated Le Menil and in the bottom is situated Saint-Maurice-sur-Moselle.

== Points of interest ==
- Arboretum de Fresse-sur-Moselle
- Moselle

== See also ==
- Communes of the Vosges department
