= Ramonchamp =

- Commune
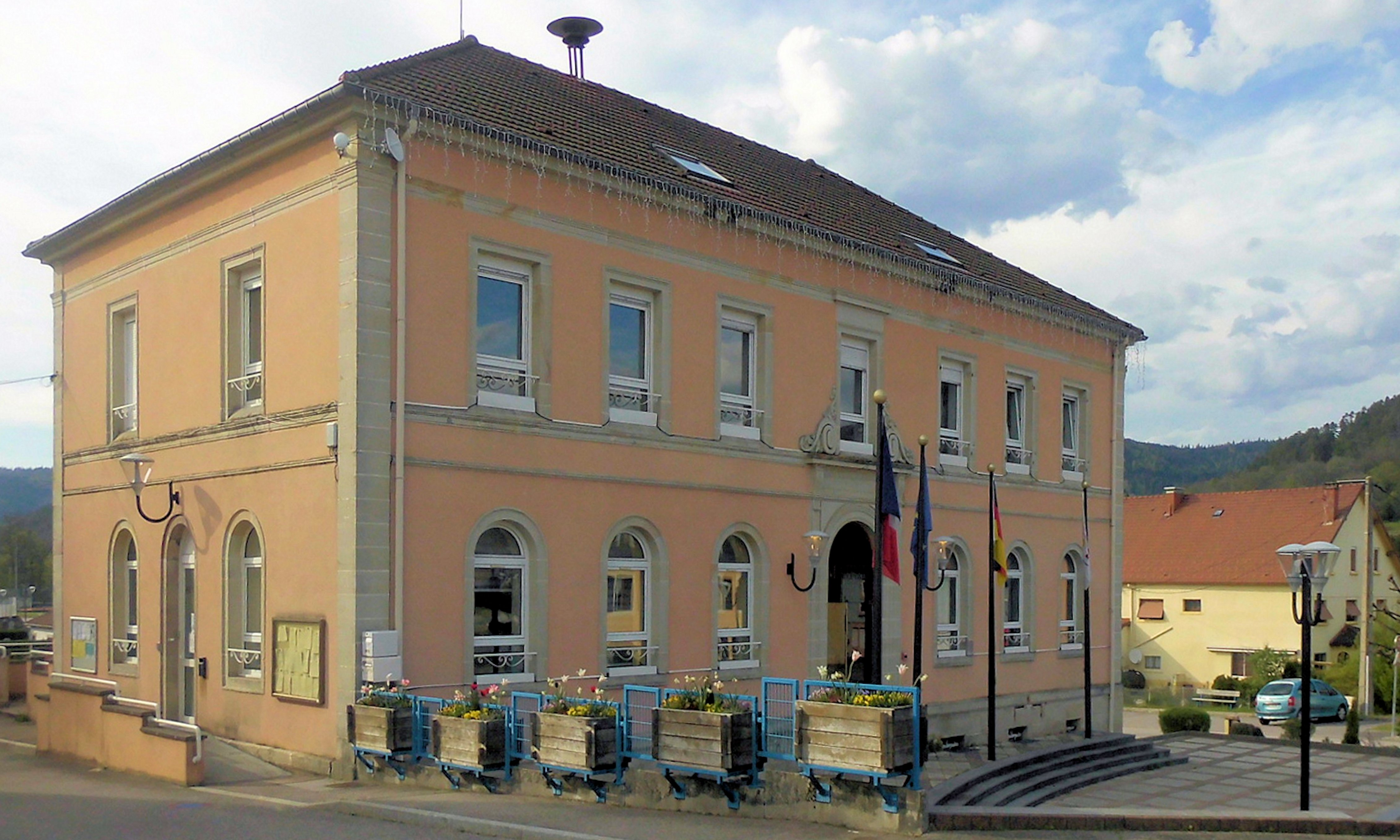
- The town hall in Ramonchamp

- Coat of arms
- Location of Ramonchamp
- Location within France Location within Grand Est
- Coordinates: 47°53′32″N 6°44′25″E
- Country: France
- Region: Grand Est
- Department: Vosges
- Arrondissement: Épinal
- Canton: Le Thillot
- Intercommunality: CC Ballons des Hautes-Vosges

Government
  - Mayor (2020–2026): André Demange
- Area^{1}: 15.74 km^{2} (6.08 sq mi)
- Highest elevation: 903 m (2,963 ft)
- Lowest elevation: 454 m (1,490 ft)
- Population (2023): 1,815
  - Density: 115.3/km^{2} (298.7/sq mi)
- Time zone: UTC+01:00 (CET)
  - Summer (DST): UTC+02:00 (CEST)
- INSEE/Postal code: 88369 /88160
- ^{1} French Land Register data, which excludes lakes, ponds, glaciers > 1 km^{2} (0.386 sq mi or 247 acres) and river estuaries.

Ramonchamp (French pronunciation: [ʁamɔ̃ʃɑ̃]) is a large commune in the Vosges department in Grand Est in northeastern France.

== Geography ==
Downstream of Le Thillot and upstream of Ferdrupt, Ramonchamp is positioned in a narrow section of the upper Moselle valley. The only main road is the National road RN66 which connects with Remiremont some 25 kilometres (16 mi) to the south west and the Bussang Pass into Alsace en route for Mulhouse to the east-southeast.

In other directions, the mountain slopes are too steep to afford easy access to Saulxures-sur-Moselotte, positioned in an adjacent valley to the north, though for the intrepid a relatively direct route exists courtesy of the 791-meter-high Morbieux Pass (Col de Morbieux).

Ramonchamp traditionally featured mountain style agriculture, but in recent decades many of the little family farms have been purchased by outsiders and transformed into second homes.

== Population ==
Inhabitants are called Ramoncenais in French.

Historical population
Year	Pop.	±% p.a.
1968	1,751	—
1975	2,099	+2.62%
1982	2,076	−0.16%
1990	1,985	−0.56%
1999	1,912	−0.42%
2007	1,996	+0.54%
2012	1,999	+0.03%
2017	1,978	−0.21%
2023	1,815	−1.42%
Source: INSEE

== History ==
First recorded under the Latin name 'Romanici Campus', Ramoncamp was at one stage the administrative centre of a "ban" (medieval territory) and then of a canton, but that was before the commune of Le Thillot had come into being.

The territory of Ramonchamp (Le ban de Ramonchamp) originally covered the entire upper valley of the Moselle, upstream of Ferdrupt. It fell under the bailiwick of Remiremont while the church, dedicated to Saints Rémi and Blaise, was within the Diocese of Saint-Dié in the deanery of Remiremont.

Around 1730 the parish was divided up into the parishes of Le Ménil and Fresse-sur-Moselle.

Civil boundary changes were imposed by a decree of 30 June 1860 which at the same time created the new commune of Le Thillot, 4 kilometres upstream of Ramonchamp. By the same decree Ramonchamp lost to Le Thillot its status as the cantonal capital.

The textile industry arrived in the 1830s: it received a boost after 1871, thanks to the arrival of refugees from Alsace wishing to avoid becoming Germans.

For two months in 1944 the commune found itself on the frontline between German and US forces: Ramonchamp suffered considerably from the bombardments involved.

The second half of the 19th century and the first half of the 20th century were a golden for the textile businesses, but after the Second World War the industry faced a difficult period of restructuring and modernisation, which involved large scale job losses: there was some compensating increase in employment opportunities involving newer business sectors such as plastic and metal manufacturing, however.

== Personalities ==
Jean-Joseph Brice, famous for his height of 2.45 meters, was born at Ramonchamp in 1835.

== Twin towns ==
Since 1972 Ramonchamp has been twinned with Ober-Olm (near Mainz).

== See also ==
- Communes of the Vosges department
