= List of intercommunalities of the Vosges department =

Since 1 January 2022, the Vosges department of France has counted twelve public establishments for intercommunal cooperation (EPCI) with their administrative seats in the department, two agglomerated community and 10 communautés de communes. Two of these intercommunalities also encompass communes located in other departments. One additional commune, Vicherey, is part of the communauté de communes du Pays de Colombey et du Sud Toulois whose administrative seat is located in the Meurthe-et-Moselle department.

== List of current intercommunalities ==
Legal form	Name	SIREN number	Date of creation	Number of communes	Population (2018/2019)	Area (km^{2})	Density (per km^{2})	Seat	President	Ref.
Communauté d'agglomeration	CA d'Épinal	200068757	1 January 2017	78	111,259	1,118.40	100	Golbey	Michel Heinrich	
Communauté d'agglomeration	CA de Saint-Dié-des-Vosges	200071066	1 January 2017	77 (including 3 in Meurthe-et-Moselle)	74,424	979.90	76	Saint-Dié-des-Vosges	Claude George	
Communauté de communes	CC Gérardmer Hautes Vosges	200096642	1 January 2022	8	14,256	196.38	73	Gérardmer	Stessy Speissmann	
Communauté de communes	CC des Hautes Vosges	200096634	1 January 2022	14	21,195	305.24	69	Cornimont	Didier Houot	
Communauté de communes	CC de la Porte des Vosges Méridionales	200068377	1 January 2017	10	29,357	262.80	112	Saint-Étienne-lès-Remiremont	Michel Demange	
Communauté de communes	CC de l'Ouest Vosgien	200068559	1 January 2017	70 (including 1 in Haute-Marne)	23,320	728.50	32	Neufchâteau	Simon Leclerc	
Communauté de communes	CC de Mirecourt Dompaire	200068369	1 January 2017	76	19,026	473.70	40	Mirecourt	Nathalie Babouhot	
Communauté de communes	CC Terre d'Eau	200068682	1 January 2017	45	17,692	415.20	43	Bulgnéville	Christian Prevot	
Communauté de communes	CC Bruyères - Vallons des Vosges	200042000	1 January 2014	34	15,159	220	69	Bruyères	Yves Bastien	
Communauté de communes	CC des Ballons des Hautes-Vosges	200033868	12 October 2012	8	15,114	194.50	78	Le Thillot	Dominique Peduzzi	
Communauté de communes	CC de la Région de Rambervillers	200005957	16 November 2006	30	13,052	328.80	40	Rambervillers	Alain Gerard	
Communauté de communes	CC des Vosges côté Sud-Ouest	200068773	1 January 2017	60	11,987	693.60	17	Darney	Bernard Salquebre	
Intercommunalities with their administrative seats outside of the Vosges department
Communauté de communes	CC du Pays de Colombey et du Sud Toulois	245400510	30 December 2000	38 (including 1 in Vosges)	11,392	371.80	31	Colombey-les-Belles (Meurthe-et-Moselle)	Philippe Parmentier	
