= Le Ménil =

- Commune
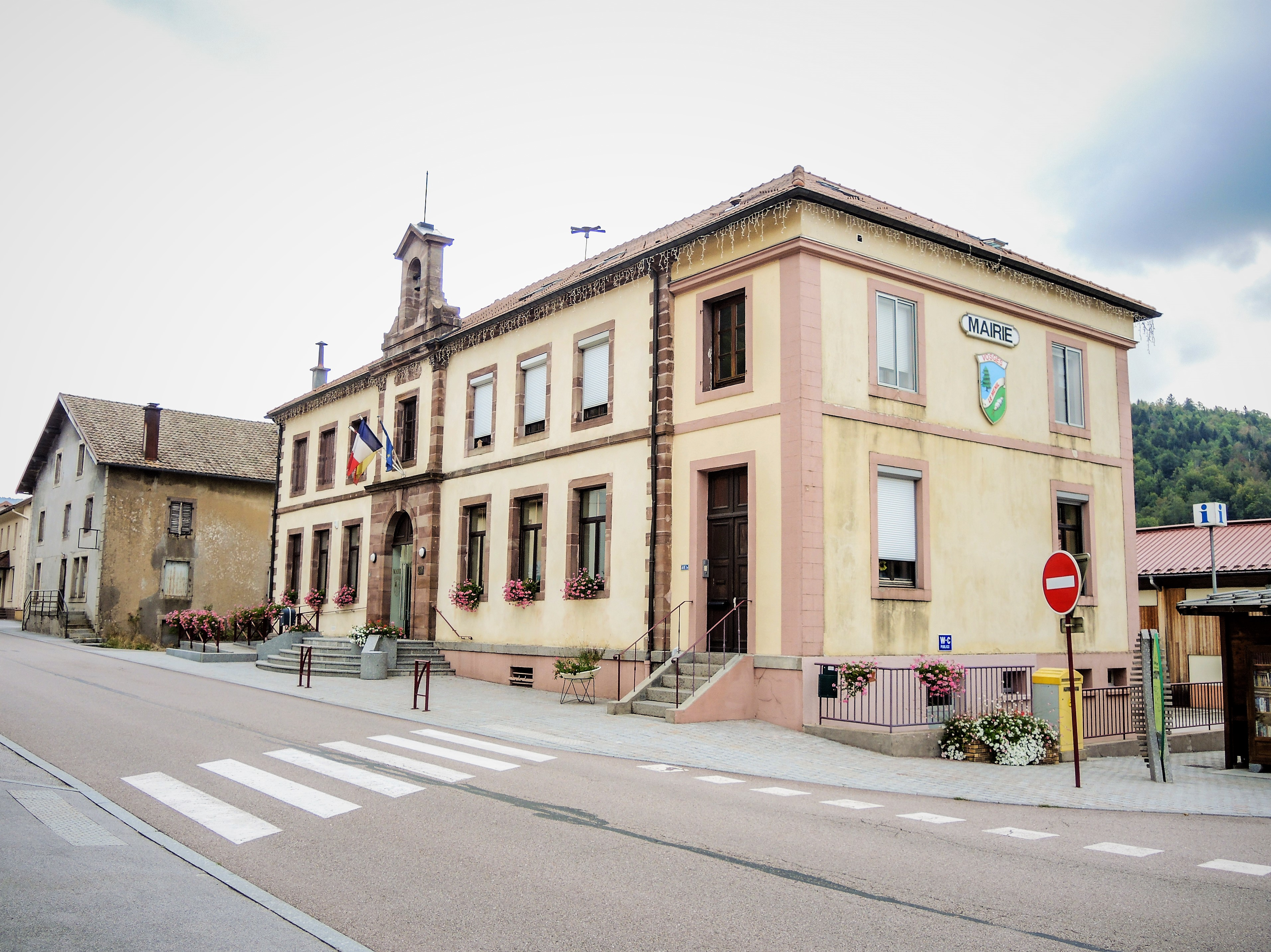
- The town hall in Le Ménil

- Coat of arms
- Location of Le Ménil
- Location within France Location within Grand Est
- Coordinates: 47°54′29″N 6°47′01″E
- Country: France
- Region: Grand Est
- Department: Vosges
- Arrondissement: Épinal
- Canton: Le Thillot
- Intercommunality: CC Ballons des Hautes-Vosges

Government
  - Mayor (2020–2026): Jean-François Viry
- Area^{1}: 20.38 km^{2} (7.87 sq mi)
- Highest elevation: 1,106 m (3,629 ft)
- Lowest elevation: 509 m (1,670 ft)
- Population (2023): 970
  - Density: 48/km^{2} (120/sq mi)
- Time zone: UTC+01:00 (CET)
  - Summer (DST): UTC+02:00 (CEST)
- INSEE/Postal code: 88302 /88160
- ^{1} French Land Register data, which excludes lakes, ponds, glaciers > 1 km^{2} (0.386 sq mi or 247 acres) and river estuaries.

Le Ménil (French pronunciation: [lə menil]) is a commune in the Vosges department in Grand Est in northeastern France. It is sometimes called Le Ménil-Thillot to distinguish it from nearby Ménil-de-Senones.

Inhabitants are called Guédons.

== Geography ==
The commune is positioned in the southeast of the département, some 6 kilometres (4 mi) to the west of the source of the Moselle at Bussang. The intervening presence of a 952-meter mountain peak means that for motorists the drive to Bussang covers approximately 15 kilometres (9 mi) however. Across the Ménil Pass to the northeast, and approached by smaller roads, is the less well known Moselotte River. The pass connects the seat of the canton, Le Thillot, with Cornimont and a number of smaller mountain villages.

The surrounding mountain summits offer superb views, and tourism has become a defining pillar of the local economy. Registered tourist accommodation exceeds 1,000 beds. The presence of a covered go-kart track in a village with a registered population of barely above 1,000 provides further evidence of the importance of tourism.

== History ==
For a long time Le Ménil was a hamlet controlled by Ramonchamp, but it became a parish in its own right in 1735, and acquired the statute on a commune under the French Revolution.

== History ==
During the World War II, Le Ménil was captured by Nazi Germany, resulting of extensively heavy damage until the Allied Powers arrived cir. 1944 - 1945.

== See also ==
- Communes of the Vosges department
