= Communauté de communes des Ballons des Hautes-Vosges =

Federation of municipalities in France

Ballons des Hautes-Vosges
- Communauté de communes
- Interactive map of Ballons des Hautes-Vosges
- Coordinates: 47°53′N 06°46′E
- Country: France
- Region: Grand Est
- Department: Vosges
- No. of communes: {{{nbcomm}}}
- Established: 2012
- Area: 194.5 km^{2} (75.1 sq mi)
- Population (2019): 14,987
  - Density: 77.05/km^{2} (199.6/sq mi)

The Communauté de communes des Ballons des Hautes-Vosges is an administrative association of rural communes in the Vosges department of eastern France. It was created in 2012 by the merger of the former Communauté de communes des Mynes et Hautes-Vosges du sud and Communauté de communes des Ballons des Hautes Vosges et de la Source de la Moselle. It consists of 8 communes, and has its administrative offices at Le Thillot. Its area is 194.5 km^{2}, and its population was 14,987 in 2019.

== Composition ==
The communauté de communes consists of the following 8 communes:

1. Bussang
2. Ferdrupt
3. Fresse-sur-Moselle
4. Le Ménil
5. Le Thillot
6. Ramonchamp
7. Rupt-sur-Moselle
8. Saint-Maurice-sur-Moselle

== See also ==
- List of intercommunalities of the Vosges department
