= Canton of Le Thillot =

Coordinates: 47°52′44″N 6°45′56″E

Le Thillot
- Canton
- Country: France
- Region: Grand Est
- Department: Vosges
- No. of communes: {{{nbcomm}}}
- Area: 229.13 km^{2} (88.47 sq mi)
- Population (2023): 17,130
  - Density: 74.76/km^{2} (193.6/sq mi)
- INSEE code: 88 15

The Canton of Le Thillot is a French administrative and electoral grouping of communes in the Vosges département of eastern France and in the region of Grand Est.

Positioned within the Arrondissement of Épinal, the canton has its administrative centre at Le Thillot.

== Composition ==
At the French canton reorganisation which came into effect in March 2015, the canton was expanded from 8 to 10 communes:

- Bussang
- Dommartin-lès-Remiremont
- Ferdrupt
- Fresse-sur-Moselle
- Le Ménil
- Ramonchamp
- Rupt-sur-Moselle
- Saint-Maurice-sur-Moselle
- Le Thillot
- Vecoux
