= Vecoux =

- Commune
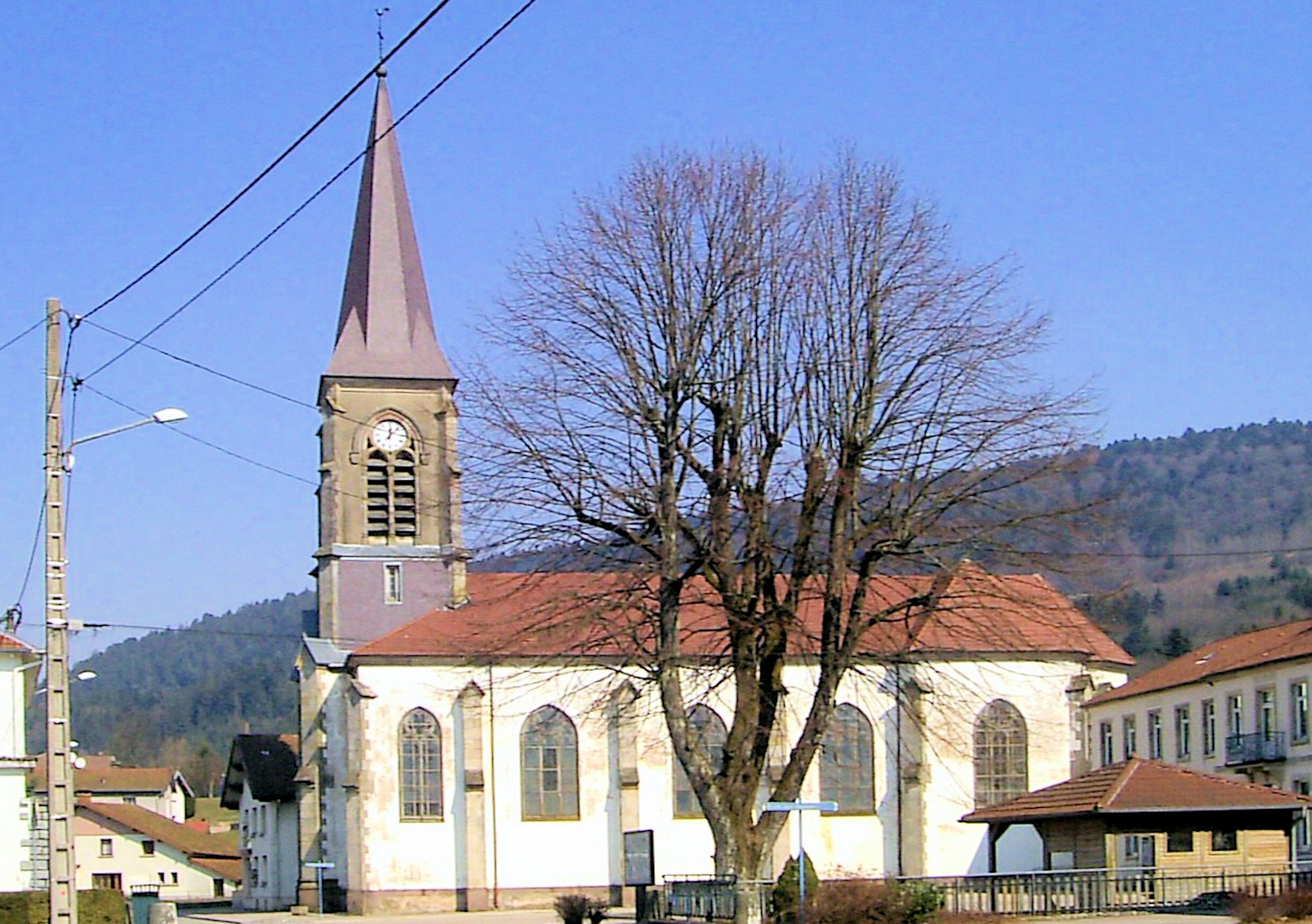
- Saint-Louis
- Location of Vecoux
- Location within France Location within Grand Est
- Coordinates: 47°58′47″N 6°38′12″E
- Country: France
- Region: Grand Est
- Department: Vosges
- Arrondissement: Épinal
- Canton: Le Thillot
- Intercommunality: CC Porte des Vosges Méridionales

Government
  - Mayor (2020–2026): Jean-Paul Miclo
- Area^{1}: 13.6 km^{2} (5.3 sq mi)
- Elevation: 408 m (1,339 ft)
- Highest elevation: 871 m (2,858 ft)
- Lowest elevation: 398 m (1,306 ft)
- Population (2023): 871
  - Density: 64.0/km^{2} (166/sq mi)
- Time zone: UTC+01:00 (CET)
  - Summer (DST): UTC+02:00 (CEST)
- INSEE/Postal code: 88498 /88200
- ^{1} French Land Register data, which excludes lakes, ponds, glaciers > 1 km^{2} (0.386 sq mi or 247 acres) and river estuaries.

Vecoux (French pronunciation: [vəku]) is a commune in the Vosges department in Grand Est in northeastern France.

== See also ==
- Communes of the Vosges department
