= Arboretum de Fresse-sur-Moselle =

Arboretum in France

Coordinates: 47.87°N 6.788°E

The Arboretum de Fresse-sur-Moselle (3 hectares) is an arboretum located in Fresse-sur-Moselle, Vosges, Grand Est, France. It contains about 150 varieties of trees.

== See also ==
- List of botanical gardens in France
