= Rupt-sur-Moselle =

- Commune
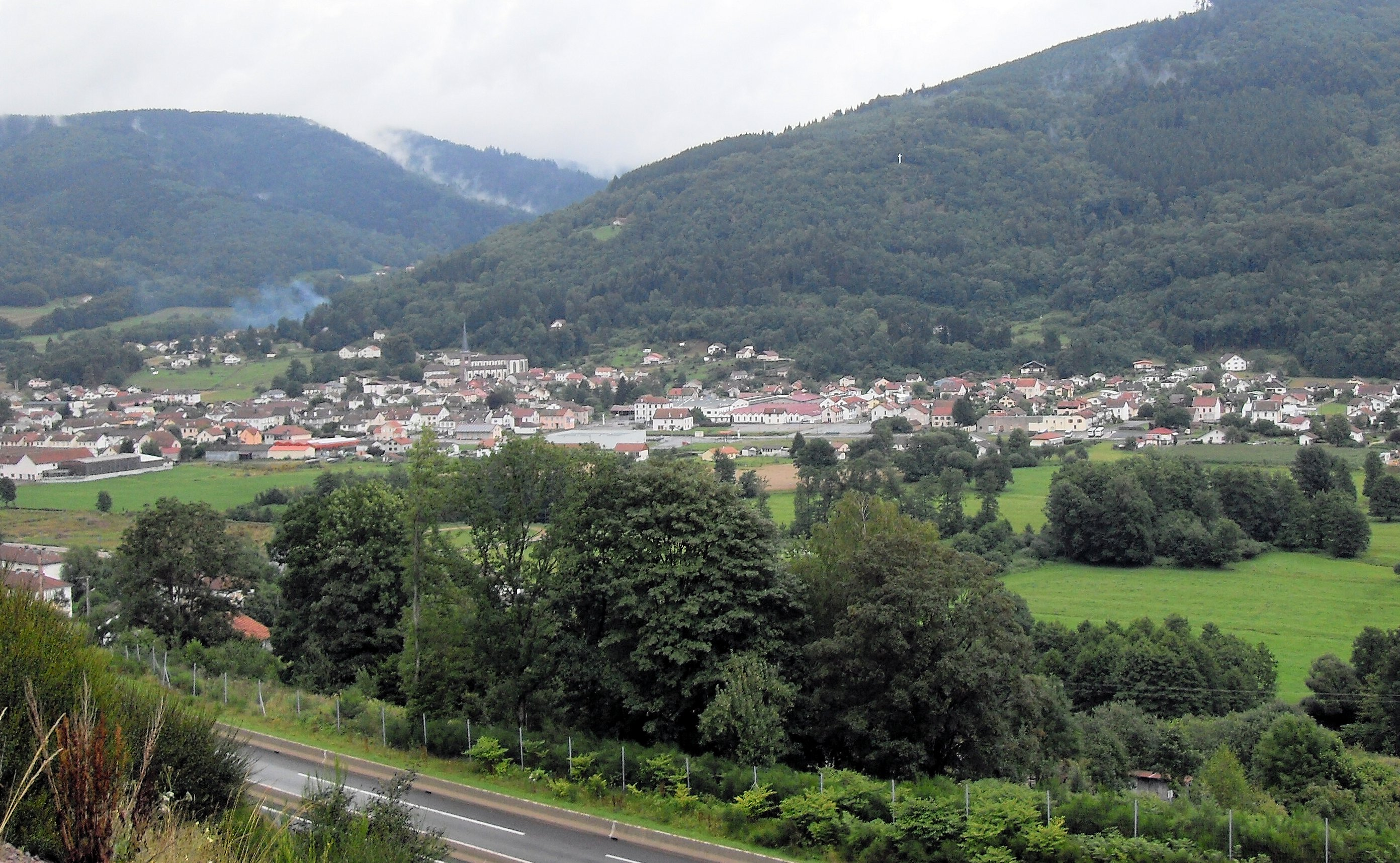
- A general view of Rupt-sur-Moselle

- Coat of arms
- Location of Rupt-sur-Moselle
- Location within France Location within Grand Est
- Coordinates: 47°55′39″N 6°39′48″E
- Country: France
- Region: Grand Est
- Department: Vosges
- Arrondissement: Épinal
- Canton: Le Thillot
- Intercommunality: CC Ballons des Hautes-Vosges

Government
  - Mayor (2020–2026): Stéphane Tramzal
- Area^{1}: 45.55 km^{2} (17.59 sq mi)
- Highest elevation: 898 m (2,946 ft)
- Lowest elevation: 399 m (1,309 ft)
- Population (2023): 3,419
  - Density: 75.06/km^{2} (194.4/sq mi)
- Time zone: UTC+01:00 (CET)
  - Summer (DST): UTC+02:00 (CEST)
- INSEE/Postal code: 88408 /88360
- Website: www.ruptsurmoselle88.fr
- ^{1} French Land Register data, which excludes lakes, ponds, glaciers > 1 km^{2} (0.386 sq mi or 247 acres) and river estuaries.

Rupt-sur-Moselle (French pronunciation: [ʁy syʁ mɔzɛl], literally Rupt on Moselle) is a commune in the Vosges department in Grand Est in northeastern France.

== Population ==
Historical population
Year	Pop.	±% p.a.
1968	3,970	—
1975	3,863	−0.39%
1982	3,570	−1.12%
1990	3,470	−0.35%
1999	3,637	+0.52%
2007	3,560	−0.27%
2012	3,475	−0.48%
2017	3,525	+0.29%
2023	3,419	−0.51%
Source: INSEE

== See also ==
- Communes of the Vosges department
