= Bussang =

Administrative division in Grand Est, France

- Commune
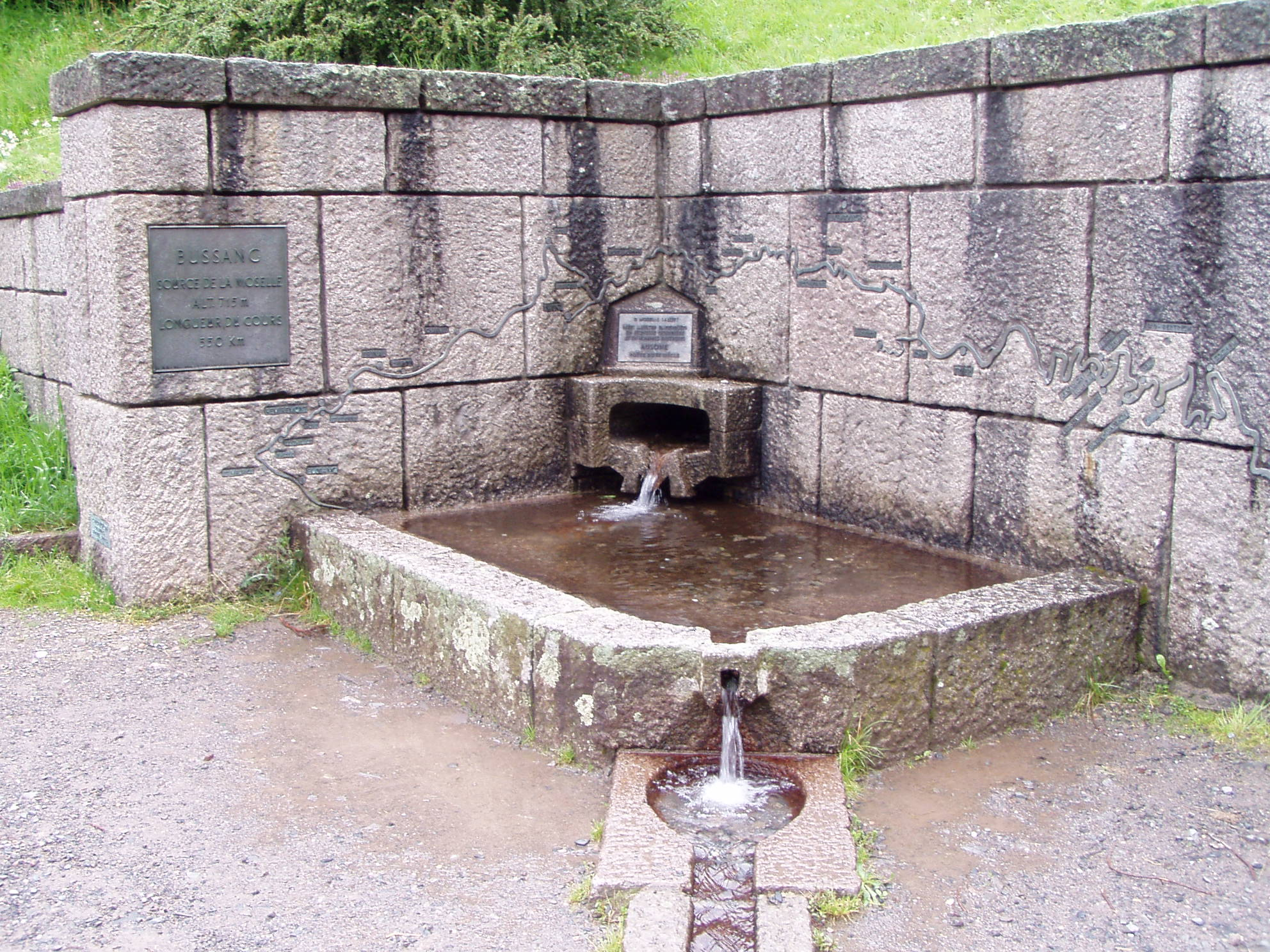
- Source of the Moselle

- Coat of arms
- Location of Bussang
- Location within France Location within Grand Est
- Coordinates: 47°53′11″N 6°51′15″E
- Country: France
- Region: Grand Est
- Department: Vosges
- Arrondissement: Épinal
- Canton: Le Thillot
- Intercommunality: CC Ballons des Hautes-Vosges

Government
  - Mayor (2020–2026): Bachir Aïd
- Area^{1}: 27.63 km^{2} (10.67 sq mi)
- Highest elevation: 1,221 m (4,006 ft)
- Lowest elevation: 568 m (1,864 ft)
- Population (2023): 1,261
  - Density: 45.64/km^{2} (118.2/sq mi)
- Time zone: UTC+01:00 (CET)
  - Summer (DST): UTC+02:00 (CEST)
- INSEE/Postal code: 88081 /88540
- ^{1} French Land Register data, which excludes lakes, ponds, glaciers > 1 km^{2} (0.386 sq mi or 247 acres) and river estuaries.

Bussang (French pronunciation: [bysɑ̃]; German: Büssingen or Büssing) is a French mountain commune located in the Vosges department, in the Grand Est region. It is the highest commune in the Upper Moselle valley, where the river originates (715 m). It is part of the Vosges mountain range.

Its inhabitants are called the Bussenets (masculine) and Bussenettes (feminine).

== Geography ==
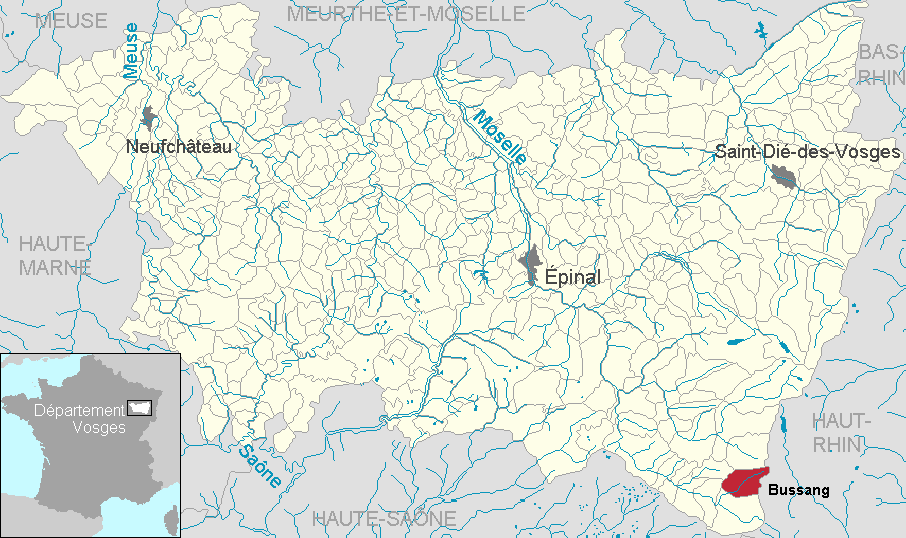
Location of Bussang in Vosges

Located at the southeastern edge of the former Lorraine region, bordering Alsace, the commune of Bussang is the source of the Moselle River and stretches lengthwise along the valley of its young source. It is one of the 201 communes within the Ballons des Vosges Nature Park, spread across four departments: Vosges, Haut-Rhin, Territoire de Belfort, and Haute-Saône. The area is particularly mountainous, boasting numerous peaks and streams. Several hamlets are scattered within its boundaries, including Taye (625 m) and La Hutte (655 m) upstream to the east, as well as the village resort of Larcenaire (827 m) and Plain de la Bouloie (800 m).

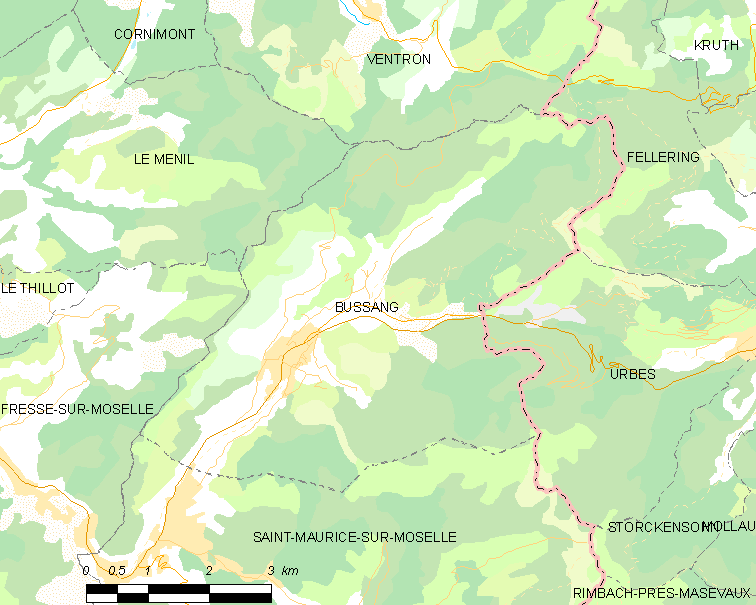
Physical geography map of Bussang

Remiremont is 34 km away and Thann 26 km away via the Bussang Pass. A small road leads directly to Ventron via the Page pass.

=== Geology and relief ===
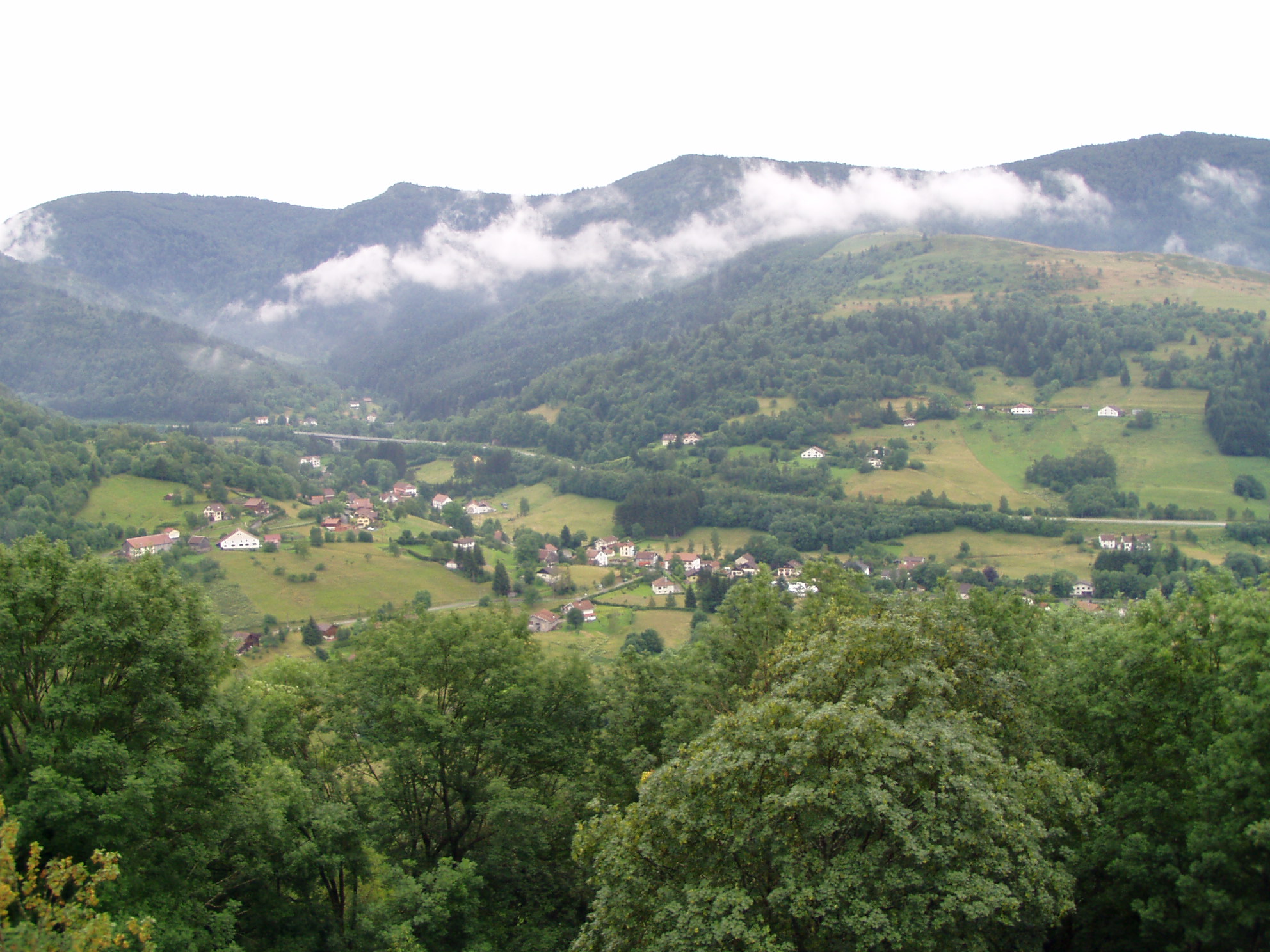

The village center is situated at an altitude of 600 meters. The commune thus occupies the highest point in the Upper Moselle Valley and is surrounded by more than fourteen peaks exceeding 1,000 meters in altitude. The four highest peaks, located to the east, mark the border with Alsace. These four peaks are Tête des Neufs-Bois (1,228 m), Tête de Fellering (1,223 m), Drumont (1,200 m), and Tête des Russiers (1,187 m).

Although it is the third highest peak in the commune, Drumont is the best known thanks to its alpine pasture and its magnificent panorama of the High Vosges Mountains at the crossroads of two major glacial valleys, the Upper Moselle and the Thur. Tête des Neufs-Bois is the highest and most imposing peak. It overlooks the upper Séchenat Valley, and its northeast-facing slopes, among the steepest in the Vosges Mountains, are of great interest for off-piste skiing. It is bordered by the Large Tête (1,179 m) and the Haut de Taye (1,161 m) to the west, and the Tête des Allemands (1,014 m) to the north. More than six mountain streams cascade down the slopes of this valley. Descending the Haut de Taye ridge, one finds the Broche and the statue of Saint Barbara, which offers a view of the village and the Moselle Valley.

In the same area, but on the other side of the young Moselle River to the north, lies the Drumont massif and the upper Hutte Valley. This area is also high-altitude, situated in the montane and subalpine zones. The area alone includes six peaks over 1,000 m: Drumont, Tête de Fellering, Tête des Russiers, and Hasenkopf (1,182 m), as well as, to the north, Haut de Brampas (1,062 m) and Tête de Meusfoux (1,085 m). The latter overlooks the Hutte valley and its hamlet, located below at an altitude of 655 m. Haut de Brampas is also the northernmost peak in the commune. In this same area are Haut du Charat (988 m) and two passes on either side of Meusfoux: Col du Collet to the west and Col du Page to the east, both leading to the commune of Ventron.

Vintage postcards by Adolphe Weick.

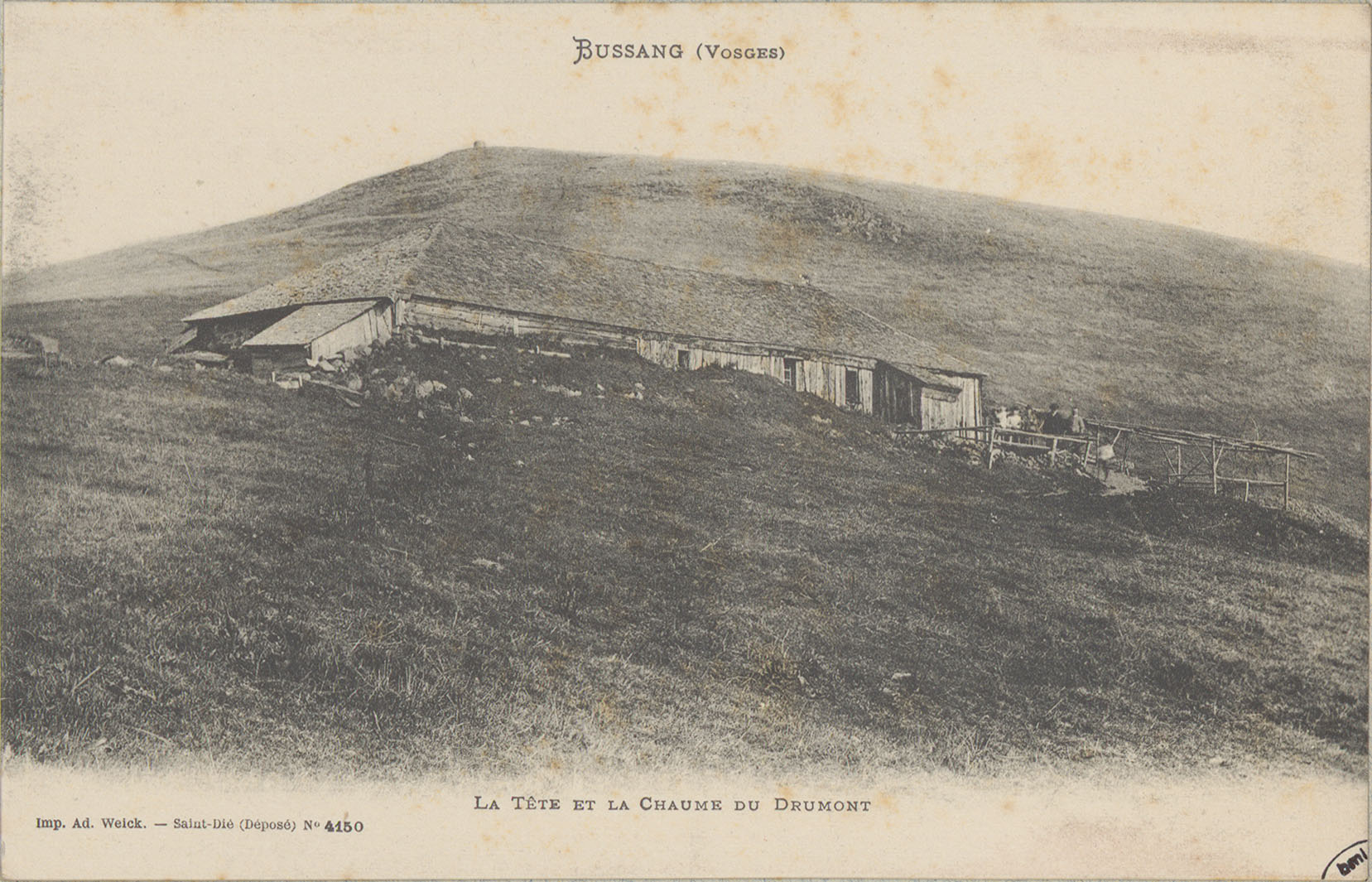
The head and the thatch of Drumont.

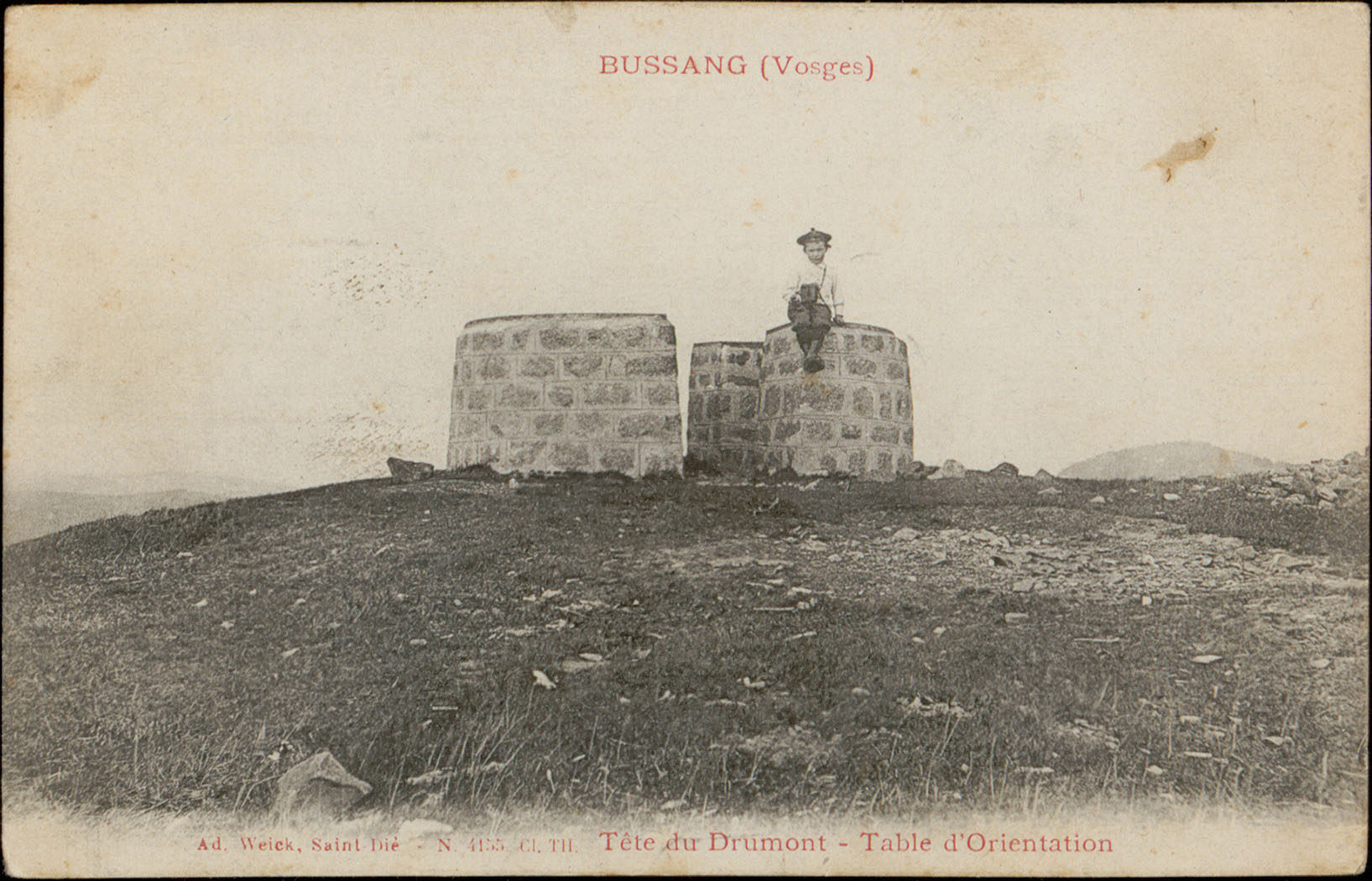
Orientation table at the summit of Drumont.

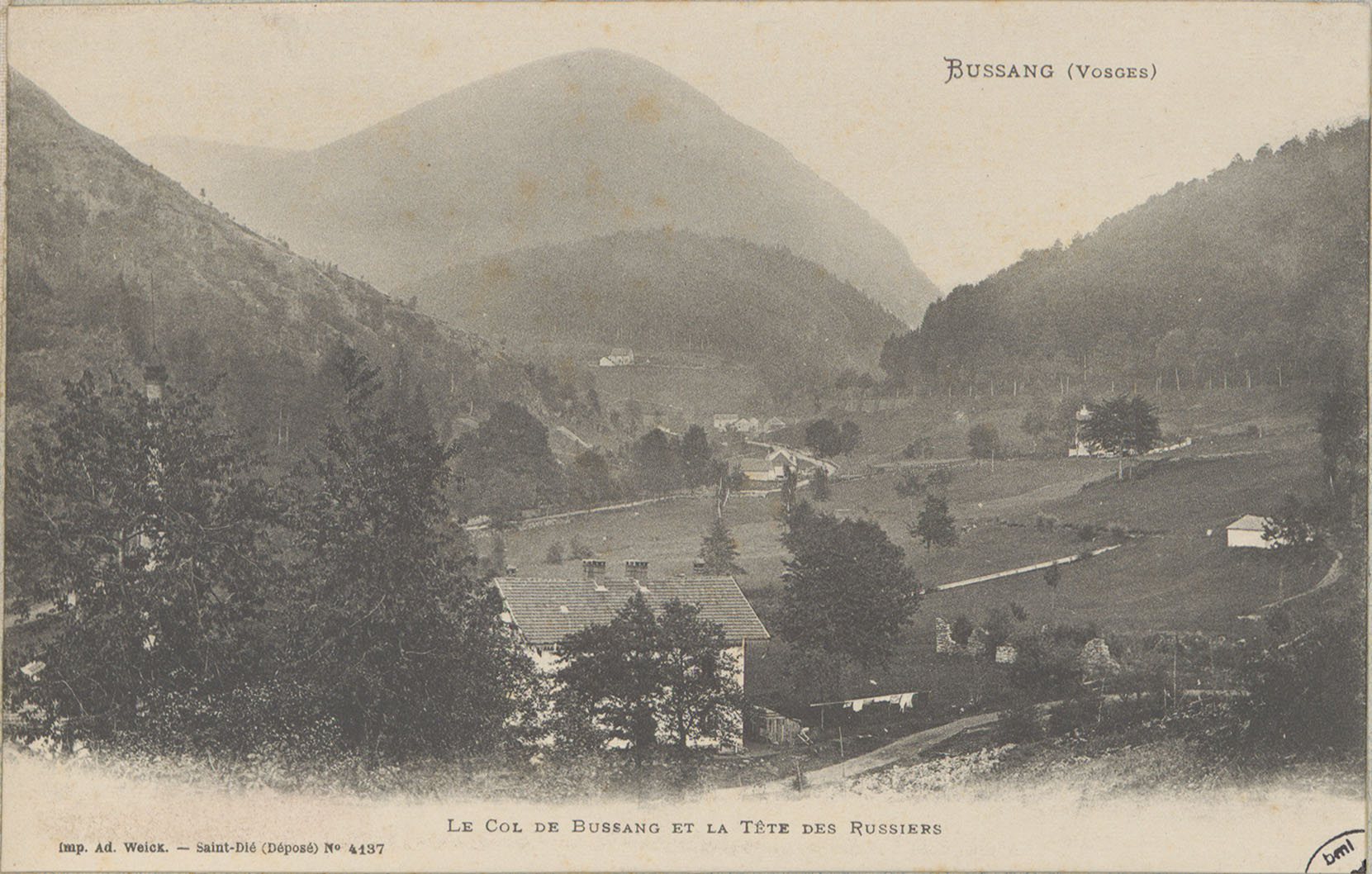
The Bussang Pass and the Tête des Russiers.

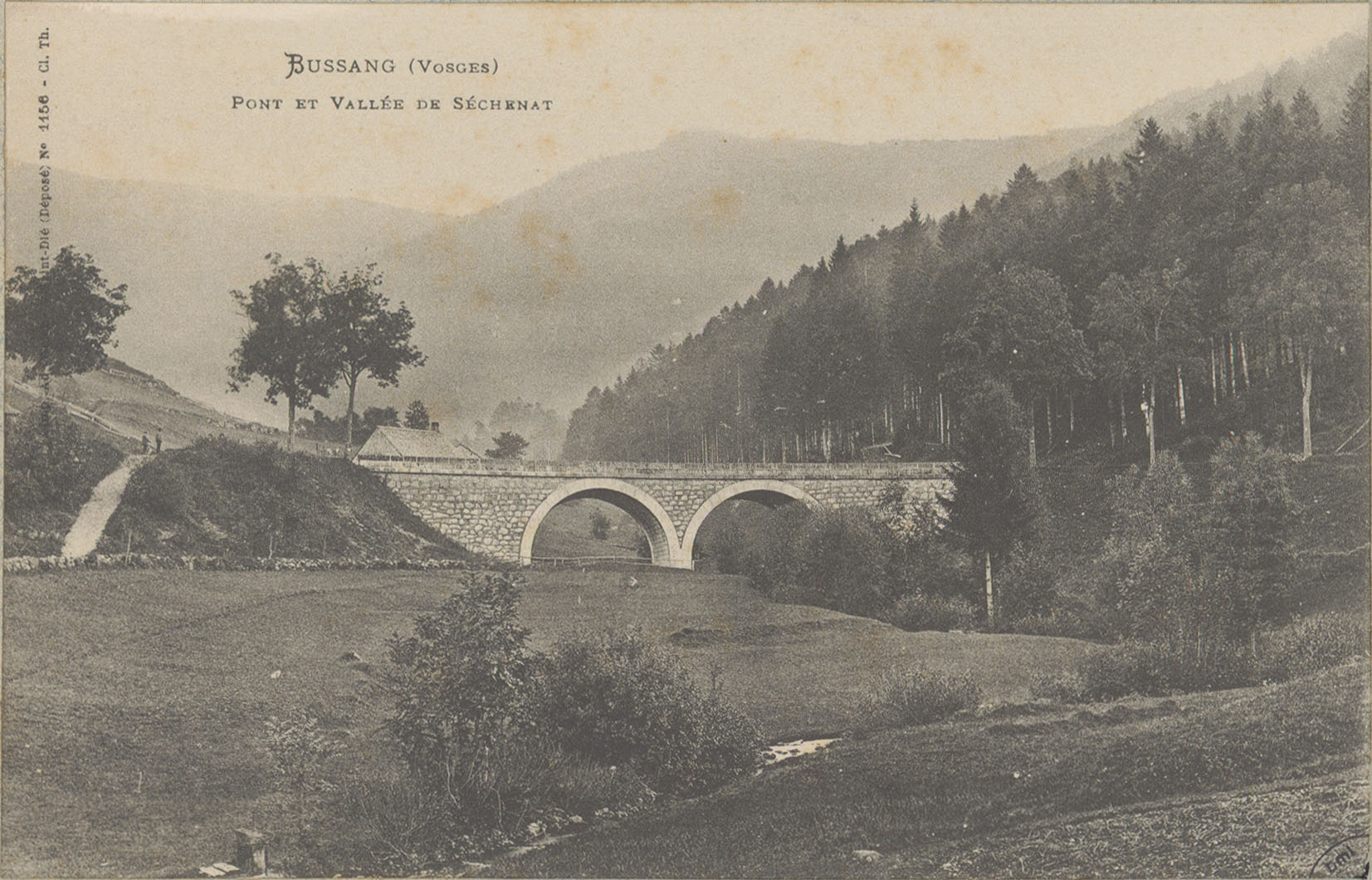
Bridge and valley of Séchenat.

Further west, beyond the Collet pass, lies the Haut de la Croix de l'Ermite, reaching an altitude of 1,065 m. The summit takes its name from the hermit Pierre-Joseph Formet, known as Brother Joseph, who lived near Ventron. Continuing west, one finds the Haut de Rochelotte (1,003 m) and the eponymous pass, followed by the Tête des Corbeaux at 1,094 m. The Larcenaire ski resort is located at the foot of these two peaks on a plateau at an altitude of 830 m. Further south, one finds the Tête des Révolles and its two antennas at 965 m; this is the summit closest to the village center. At the western edge of the commune, the altitude decreases, and one finds the last two peaks: Haut des Sauvages (910 m) and Berhamont (898 m). On the other side of the Moselle River rises the last part of the Bussang mountain range, which includes the Haut de la Rocholle (941 m) and then the Tête de la Bouloie (1,166 m).

Downhill skiing is practiced at Larcenaire (altitude 830-1,100 m) and cross-country skiing at Rochelotte. The La Bouloie ski resort has been closed since 2010.

=== Hydrography and groundwater ===
The commune is located in the Rhine watershed within the Rhine-Meuse basin. It is drained by the Moselle River, the Hutte stream, the Lamerey stream, the Noiregoutte stream, and the Sechenat stream. The Bussang territory is dotted with small secondary valleys carved by numerous streams, called "gouttes" in the local mountain dialect, including the four main ones already mentioned: the Sechenat, Hutte, Lamerey, and Noiregoutte streams. Among their tributaries are the Goutte Devant, Page, Saint-Louis, and Drumont streams, as well as many others that are not named.

The Moselle River, with a total length of 560 kilometers, 315 kilometers of which are in France, rises within the commune's territory at the Bussang Pass and flows into the Rhine at Koblenz in Germany.

The Menil and Sechenat streams.

Hydrogeology and climatology: Information system for groundwater management in the Rhine-Meuse basin:

Municipal territory: Land cover (CORINE LAND COVER); Watercourses (BD Carthage),
Geology: Geological map; Geological and technical cross-sections,
Hydrogeology: Groundwater bodies; BD LISA; Piezometric maps.

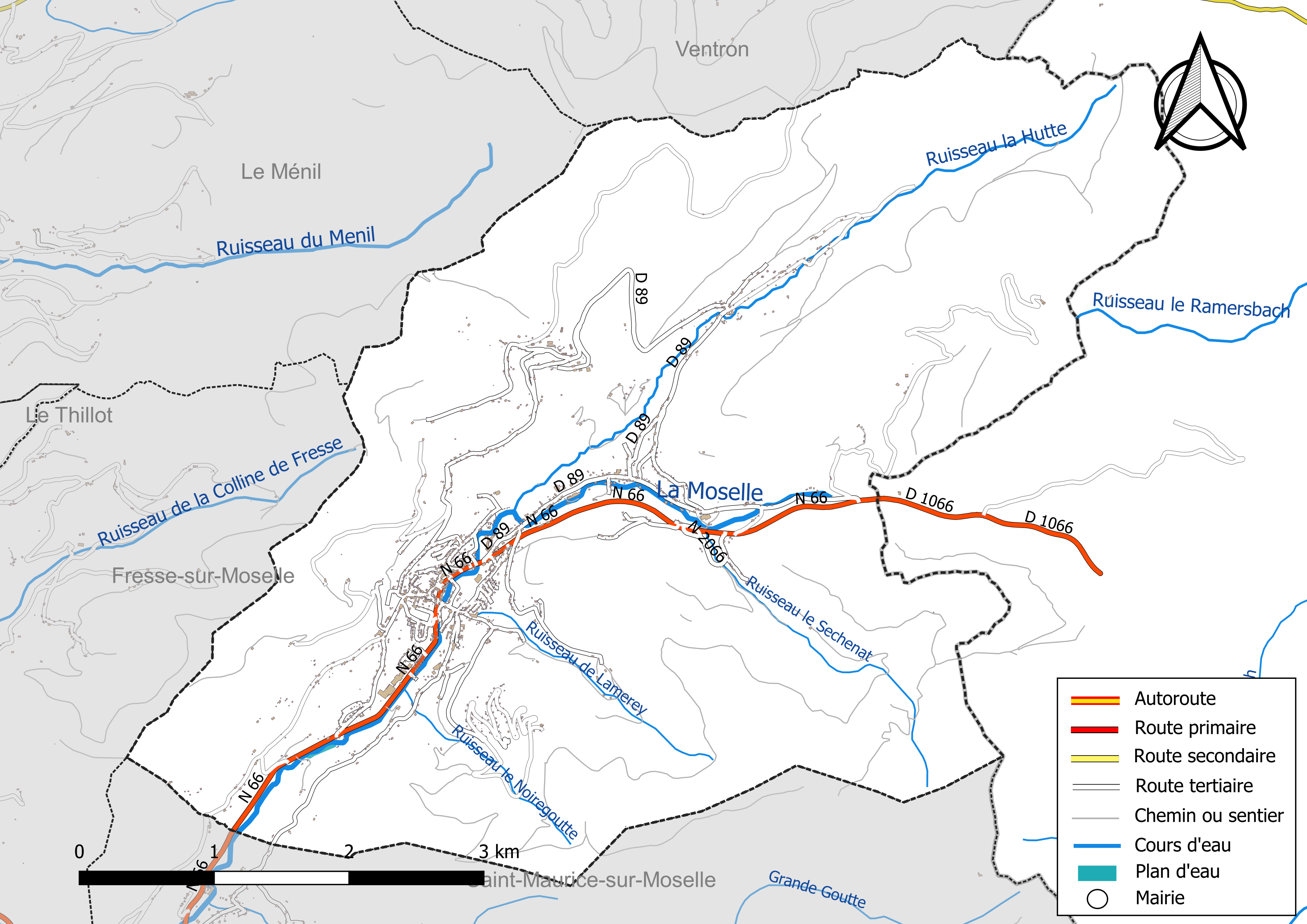
Hydrographic and road network of Bussang.

=== Climate ===
In 2010, Bussang's climate was classified as mountain, according to a study by the French National Centre for Scientific Research (CNRS) based on data covering the period 1971-2000. In 2020, Météo-France published a typology of metropolitan France's climates, in which the municipality is classified as having a semi-continental climate and is located in the Vosges climate region, characterized by very high rainfall (1,500 to 2,000 mm/year) in all seasons and harsh winters (below 1 °C).

For the period 1971-2000, the average annual temperature was 8.6 °C, with an annual temperature range of 16.7 °C. The average annual rainfall was 1,859 mm, with 14.3 days of precipitation in January and 11.3 days in July. For the period 1991-2020, the average annual temperature observed at the nearest Météo-France weather station, "Sewen - Lac Alfeld_sapc," located in the commune of Sewen 9 km away as the crow flies, was 10.0 °C, and the average annual rainfall was 2,282.3 mm. The maximum temperature recorded at this station was 37.2 °C, reached on July 24, 2019; the minimum temperature was -21 °C, reached on January 12, 1987.

The commune's climate parameters were estimated for the middle of the century (2041-2070) according to different greenhouse gas emission scenarios based on the new DRIAS-2020 reference climate projections. These projections can be viewed on a dedicated website published by Météo-France in November 2022.

== Urban planning ==
=== Typology ===
As of January 1, 2024, Bussang is categorized as a rural commune with dispersed housing, according to the new seven-level municipal density scale defined by INSEE in 2022. It belongs to the Thillot urban unit, an intra-departmental agglomeration comprising eight communes, of which it is a suburban commune. Furthermore, the commune is outside the influence of any city.

=== Land use ===
Land cover in Bussang, as shown in the European biophysical land cover database Corine Land Cover (CLC), is characterized by the significant presence of forests and semi-natural areas (78.5% in 2018), a decrease compared to 1990 (80.2%). The detailed breakdown in 2018 is as follows: forests (72%), grasslands (12.1%), shrub and/or herbaceous vegetation (6.5%), heterogeneous agricultural areas (5.8%), and urbanized areas (3.6%). Changes in land cover and infrastructure within the municipality can be observed on various maps of the territory: the Cassini map (18th century), the General Staff map (1820-1866), and IGN maps and aerial photographs for the current period (1950 to the present).

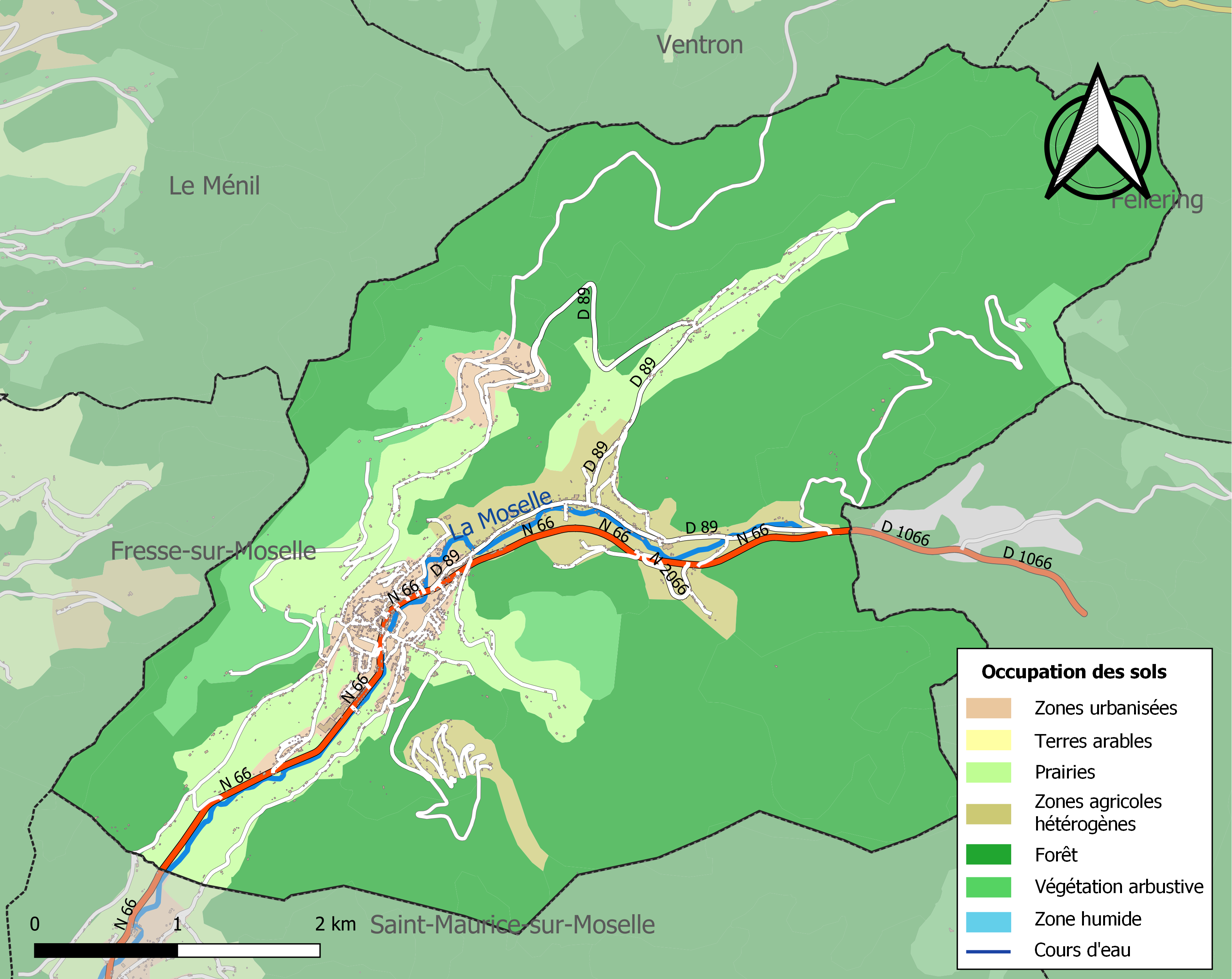
Map of infrastructure and land use in the commune in 2018 (CLC).

The commune benefits from the local urban development plan, the latest procedure of which was approved on March 13, 2015.

=== Natural and technological risks ===
==== Seismicity ====
Bussang is located in an area of moderate seismicity.

== Name ==
From a Germanic personal name, Bosso or Busso, followed by the suffix -ingen, Francization to -ang: "Bosso's Estate."

Buzant (11th, 12th centuries), Bussang (1434), Bussanc (1435), Bussain (1493), Bussan (1560), Bussans (1561), Buyssant (1563), Busans (1594), Bossan (16th century), Bussanum (1768). In German: Büssing(en).

In the 19th century, Bussang was also known postally as Biltzenbach.

== History ==
The upper Moselle valley was traversed by the Roman road linking Metz to Basel. Bussang and Saint-Maurice-sur-Moselle were united under the name Visentine until 1420, a name the parish retained until its division in 1767.

The Engelbourg castle, residence of the Counts of Ferrette and later the Habsburgs, controlled the trade route over the Bussang Pass.

In February 1856, nuns from the Saint-Esprit convent in Rouceux, who had come to respond to a cholera epidemic, founded a hospice to care for the elderly and orphans.

The town's development was based successively on the exploitation of relatively modest lead, copper, and silver mines, mineral springs, and then the textile industry. Benjamin Pottecher, an industrialist specializing in the manufacture of cutlery and mayor of the locality, was one of the first in France to implement the eight-hour day.

=== Projects to tunnel through the Southern Vosges ===
The failure of projects to open up the southern Vosges region was initially a consequence of the political and strategic precautions imposed by the 1871 border. With the end of the First World War, numerous and well-reasoned proposals for tunneling through the Vosges emerged, each with its own distinct approach, but no decision has yet been made regarding a tunnel through the southern Vosges aimed at revitalizing activity on both sides of the mountain range. During this turbulent political period in Europe, a completely unexpected counter-proposal appeared in 1913: it proposed passing under the Ballon d'Alsace, some distance from Bussang, to connect Saint-Maurice-sur-Moselle or Le Thillot to Giromagny in the Territoire de Belfort. Construction began on a tunnel at Bussang[38], intended to link Saint-Maurice-sur-Moselle and Wesserling and help open up the upper Moselle valley, but it was never completed.

Further north, the Sainte-Marie-aux-Mines tunnel—the Maurice-Lemaire tunnel—now converted into a road tunnel and brought up to European standards, connects the upper Meurthe valley with Alsace; This opens up prospects for interregional and cross-border development, linking Saint-Dié-des-Vosges to Sélestat. The breakthrough through the southern Vosges has been awaited project since 1909.

In a pamphlet published in 1909, the Pinot-Pottecher committee had indeed endeavored to highlight the advantages of the Bussang tunnel project and the drawbacks of the two other southern Vosges projects, leaving aside the projects further north at Sainte-Marie-aux-Mines and Saales, which it considered to be outside its purview. It summarized its conclusions as follows: “We believe we have sufficiently demonstrated the great benefit of giving preference to the Bussang-Kruth breakthrough project.”

=== World War 2 ===
After the arrival of the Germans in June 1940, many residents of Bussang joined the local resistance groups. They participated in the escape of prisoners in Alsace. During this period of occupation, some families were forced to shelter German soldiers.

The town of Bussang was liberated in November 1944. Having escaped bombing, its inhabitants erected a statue of the town's patron saint, Saint Barbara, in 1948 in gratitude for her protection.

A center of resistance during the Second World War, the town was awarded the Croix de Guerre 1939-1945 on November 11, 1948.

== Politics and administration ==
=== Budget and taxation 2022 ===
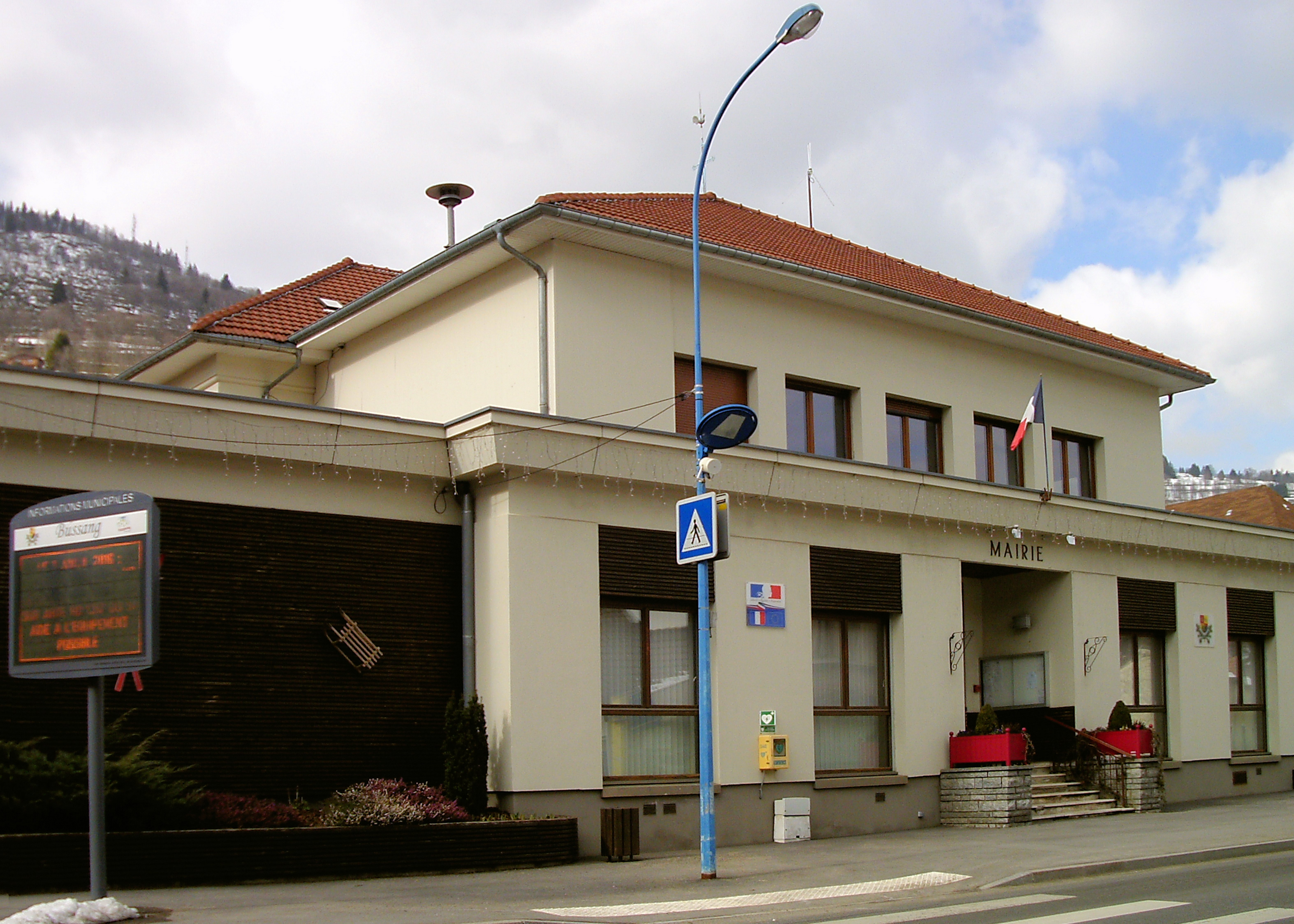
The town hall

In 2022, the commune's budget was structured as follows:

- Total operating revenue: €2,115,000, or €1,542 per inhabitant;
- Total operating expenses: €1,605,000, or €1,170 per inhabitant;
- Total investment resources: €467,000, or €340 per inhabitant;
- Total investment expenditures: €371,000, or €270 per inhabitant;
- Debt: €807,000, or €588 per inhabitant.

With the following tax rates:

- Property tax: 22.82%;
- Land tax: 40.22%;
- Undeveloped land tax: 25.12%;
- Additional tax on undeveloped land: 38.75%;
- Business property tax: 22.71%.

Key figures: Household income and poverty in 2021: Median disposable income per consumption unit in 2021: €200,100.

== Population and society ==
=== Demographics ===
==== Demographical evolution ====
The population trend is known through censuses conducted in the commune since 1793. For commune with fewer than 10,000 inhabitants, a census covering the entire population is carried out every five years, with the reference populations for the intervening years estimated by interpolation or extrapolation. For this commune, the first comprehensive census under the new system was conducted in 2008.

In 2022, the commune had 1,289 inhabitants, a decrease of 8.26% compared to 2016 (Vosges: -2.96%, France excluding Mayotte: +2.11%).

=== Education ===
Educational institutions:

- Nursery and primary school;
- Middle schools in Le Thillot, Cornimont, Saint-Amarin and La Bresse;
- High schools in Remiremont, Masevaux-Niederbruck, Thann and Gérardmer.

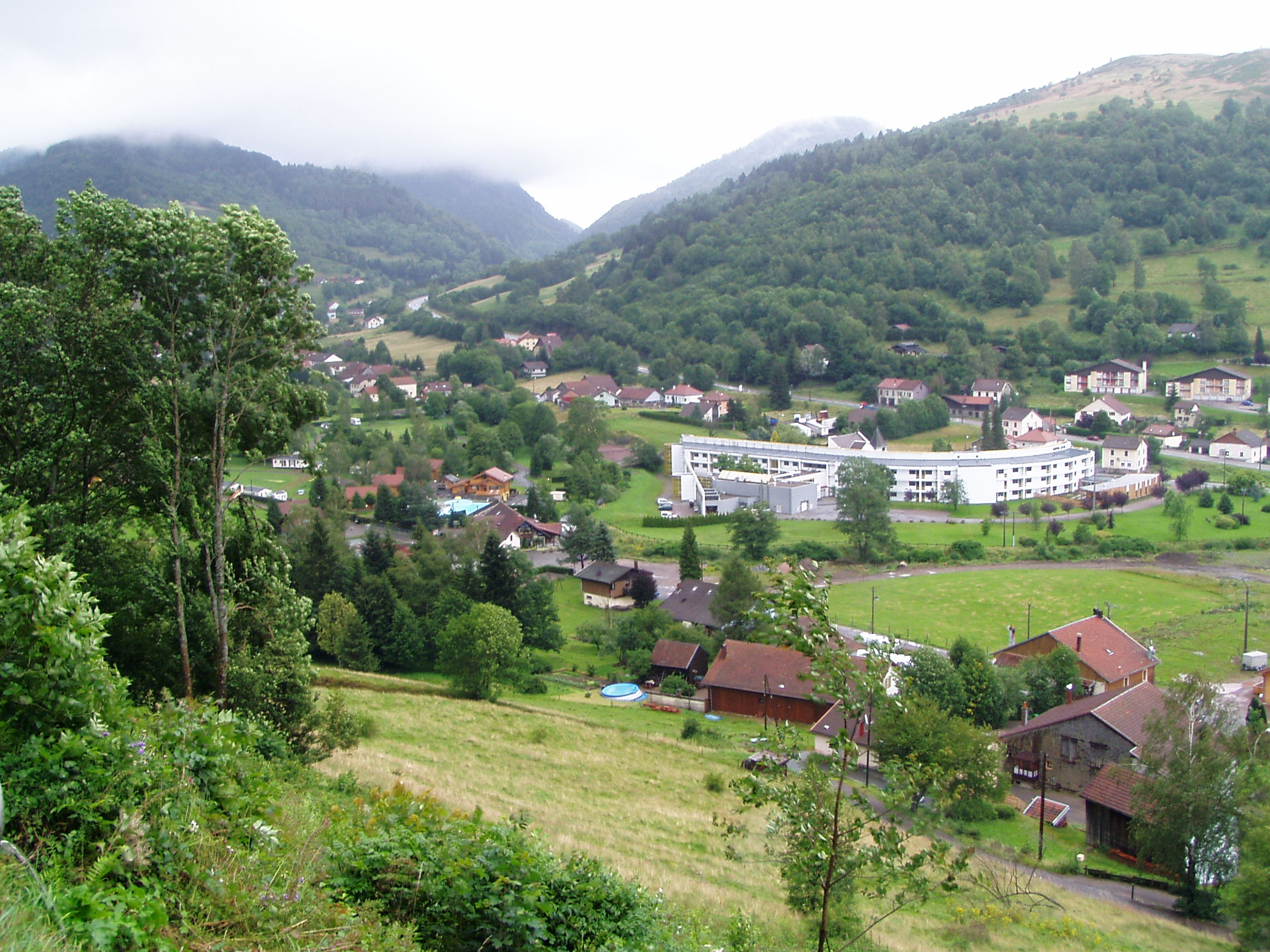
View of the local hospital

=== Healthcare ===
Healthcare professionals and facilities:

- Doctors in Bussang: Saint-Maurice-sur-Moselle, Fresse-sur-Moselle, and Le Thillot;
- Pharmacies in Bussang: Saint-Maurice-sur-Moselle, Le Thillot, and Ramonchamp;
- Hospitals in Bussang: Le Thillot, Cornimont, and Oderen.

=== Religions ===
Catholic worship, Blessed Frédéric Ozanam Parish, Le Thillot, Diocese of Saint-Dié.

== Economy ==
=== Businesses and shops ===
==== Agriculture ====
- Sheep and goat farming.
- Growing of vegetables, melons, roots, and tubers.

==== Tourism ====
The town of Bussang was officially designated a tourist resort in November 2018.

- Restaurants.
- Hotels.
- Gîtes de France (self-catering cottages).
- Mountain refuges.

==== Mineral waters ====
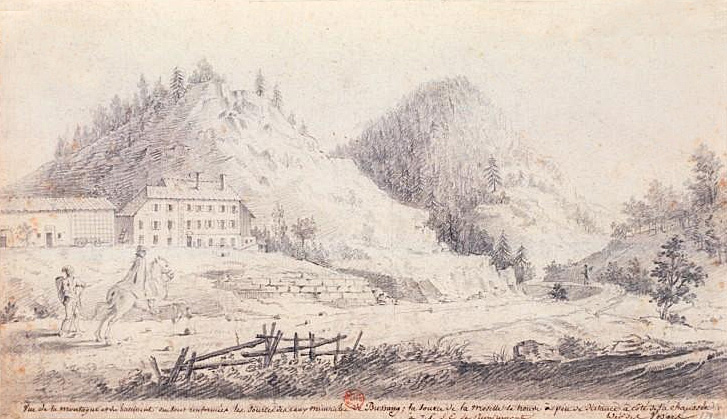
View of the mountain and the building housing the Bussang mineral water springs (1790).

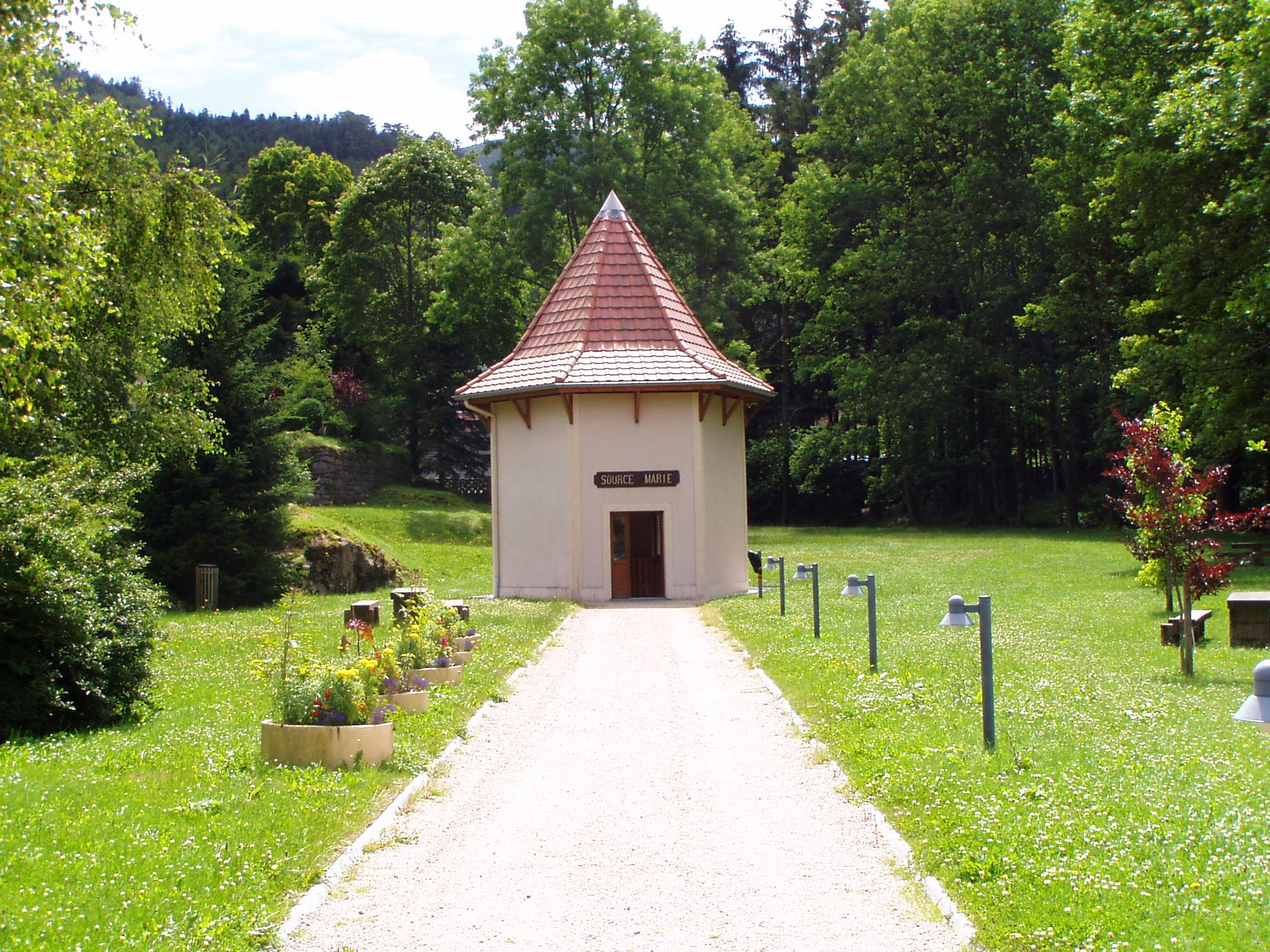
The Marie spring

Discovered on the mountainside, the mineral waters of Bussang transformed the town into a spa resort.

Four springs were unearthed: the Grande Salmade, the Petite Salmade, the Demoiselles, and the Marie spring.
In the 17th century, the Dukes of Lorraine were drawn to this natural resource. The water was ferruginous and restorative, recommended for treating anemia. One of the slogans of the time was "Bussang = Sang Bu" (Bussang = Blood Bu). From the mid-19th century onward, the industry developed, and a modern spa establishment was built. Iron tends to deposit on the sides of the bottles, and the water loses its ferruginous properties during transport to Paris. A spa resort supplied by these waters allows for tourism among spa-goers.

In 1908 and 1909, analyses revealed that the water in Bussang contained radioactive elements. Doctors of the time recommended this water, and its radioactivity became a selling point. It was nicknamed "the most radioactive water in France."

Damaged during both World Wars, the spa lost its accreditation from the French Social Security system in 1958 due to insufficient flow and bacterial contamination of three of the aforementioned springs. Its public utility status was revoked. Consequently, in 1971, the bottling plant closed, making way for a soft drink factory, which itself went bankrupt in the late 1980s.

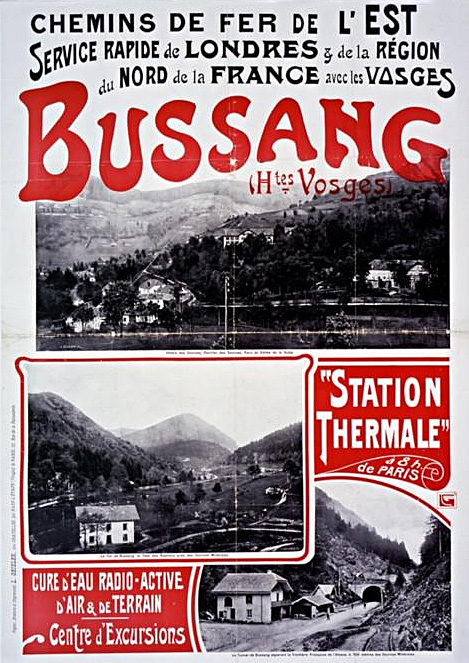
Poster from 1909

Bussang, however, has not given up hope of regaining its glorious past as a spa town in the near future. Indeed, private investors purchased part of the site in 1997, cleaned it up, and are now in the process of acquiring the remaining portion, which is currently in receivership. They now own a new spring, the Mont Charat spring, which is being studied by Straumann, a hydrologist in Strasbourg. This new spring has the same characteristics as the Salmade and Demoiselle springs, which are currently unusable due to bacterial contamination. The only remaining spring is the Marie spring, which is municipal property and therefore open to the public.

- The commune purchased the former bottling plant site through a pre-emption right. This pre-emption is currently the subject of proceedings before the Nancy Administrative Court and the Épinal High Court. Therefore, the municipality does not yet own the property outright. In any case, the former water sources of the bottling plant remain affected by bacterial pollution, and only drilling at the Mont Charat spring, owned by private investors, will allow for the resumption of bottling operations. A project is currently under consideration.
- Chosen by the municipality, the Vikings group created a gaming establishment equipped with 50 slot machines and traditional games, as well as a restaurant and a performance hall. Since Bussang has never lost its status as a spa town, authorization from the Ministry of the Interior was obtained on July 19, 2005. The casino has been open since November 9, 2006.
- Local shops and services.

== Culture and local heritage ==
=== Places and monuments ===
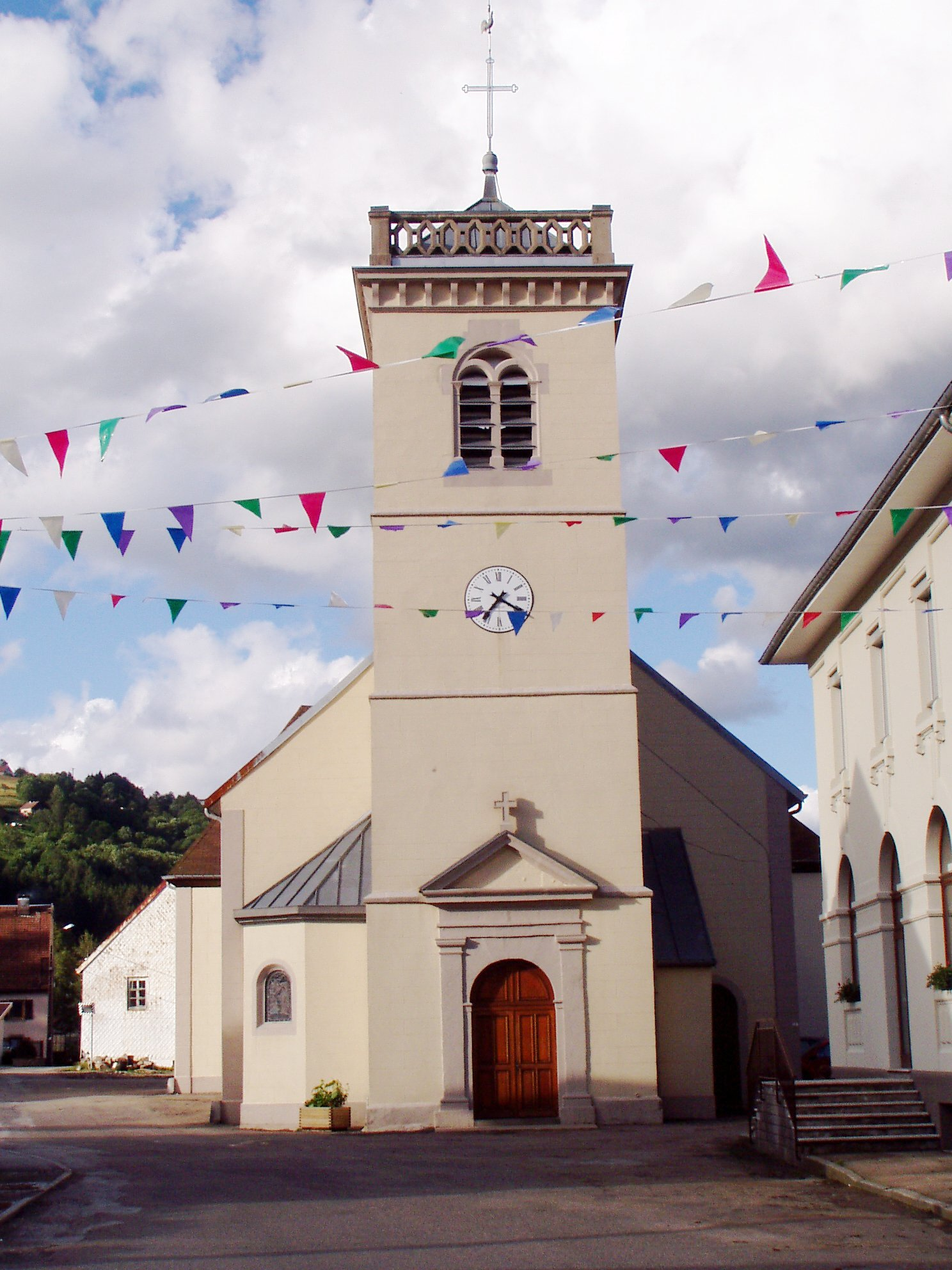
Sainte-Barbe's Church.

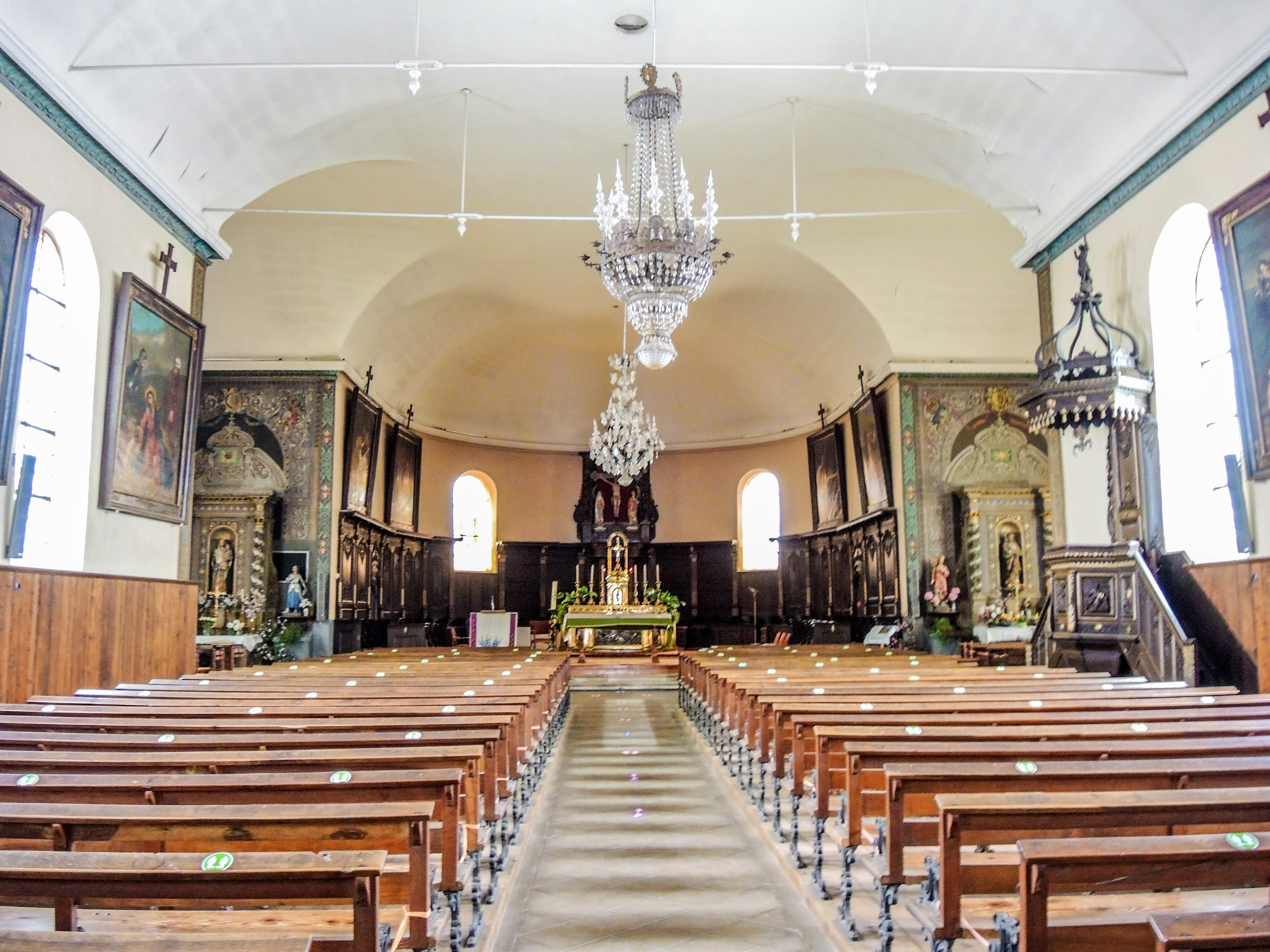
Nave of the church.

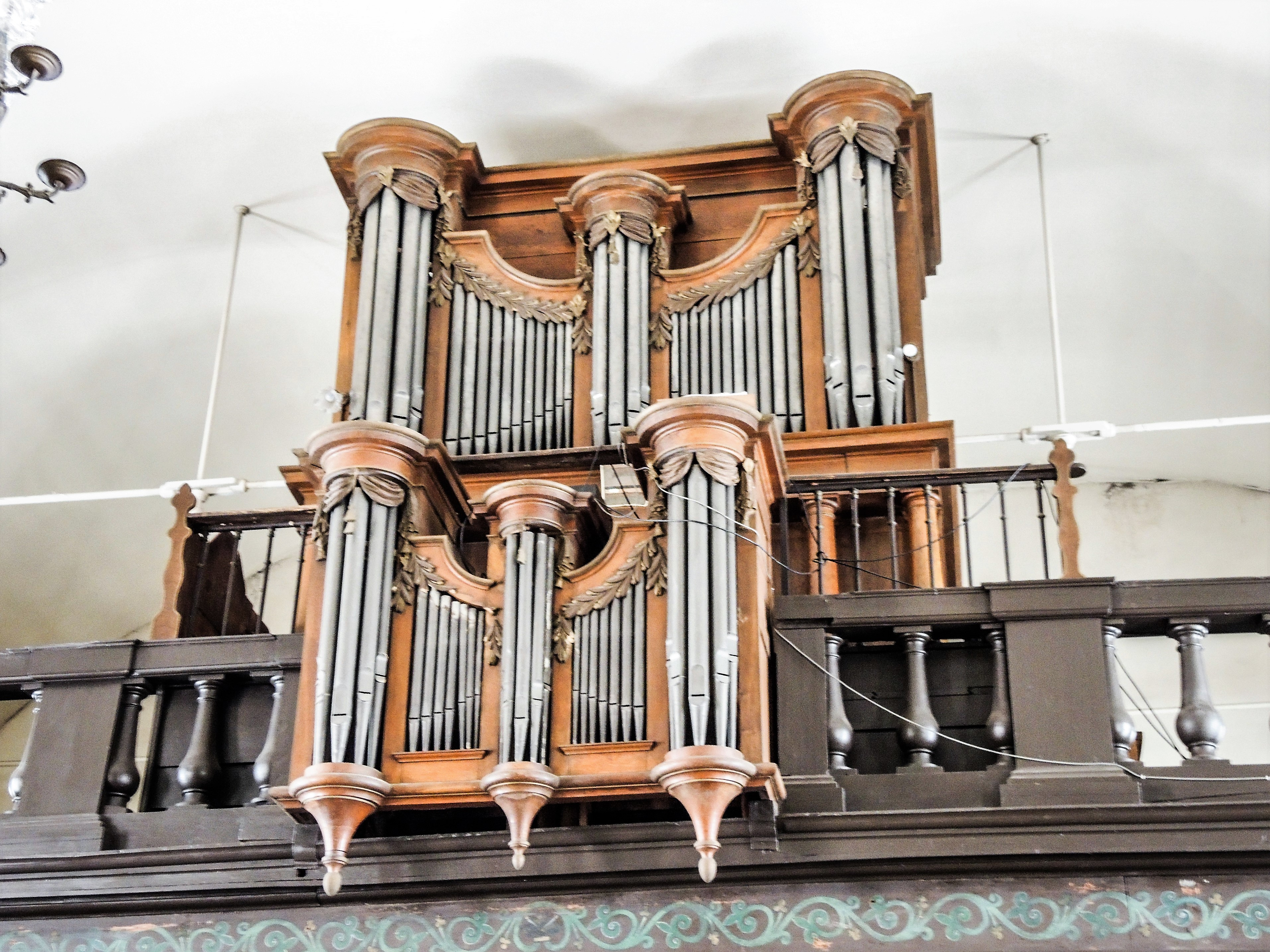
Organ of Jean-Nicolas Jeanpierre.

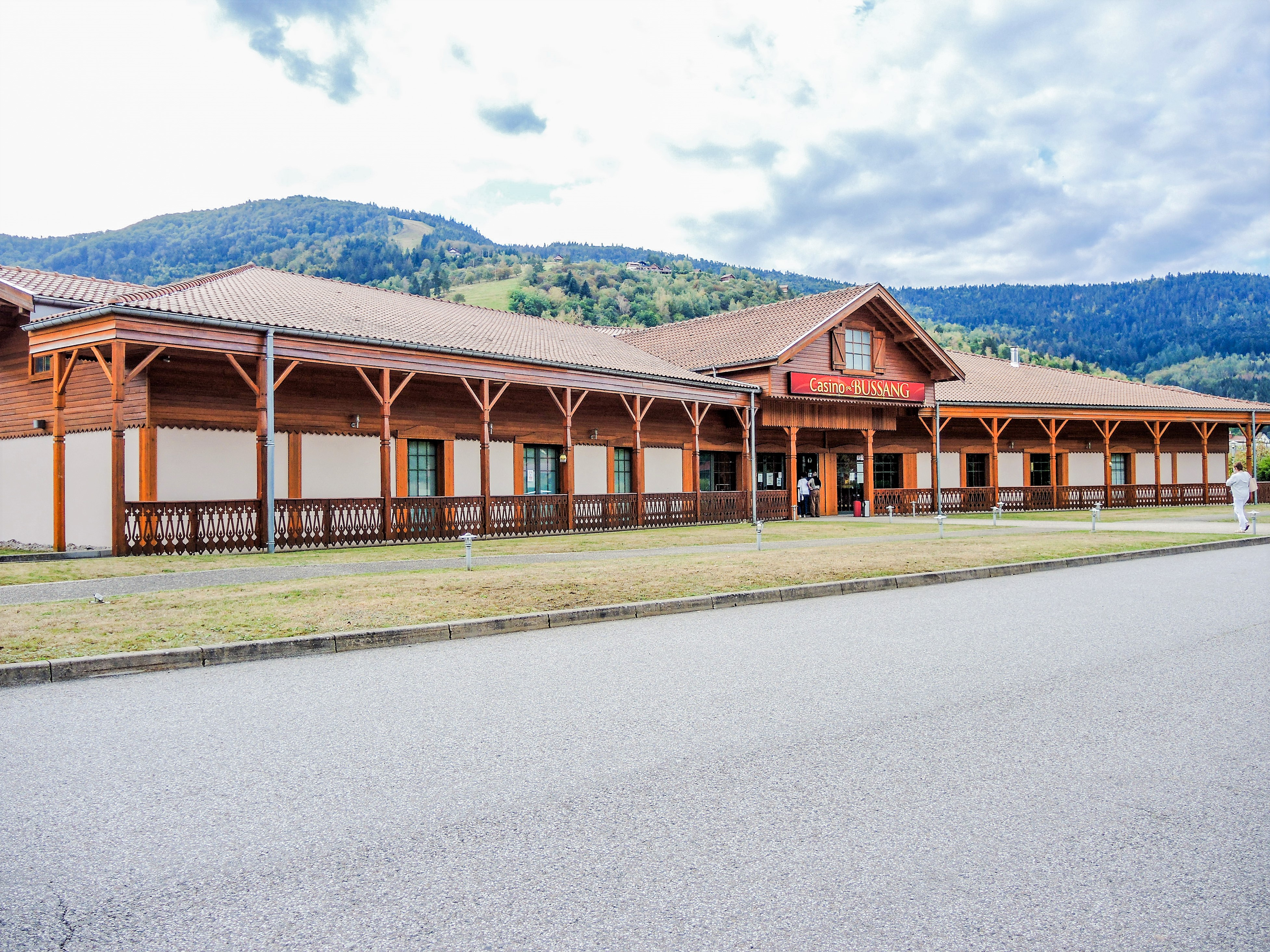
Casino

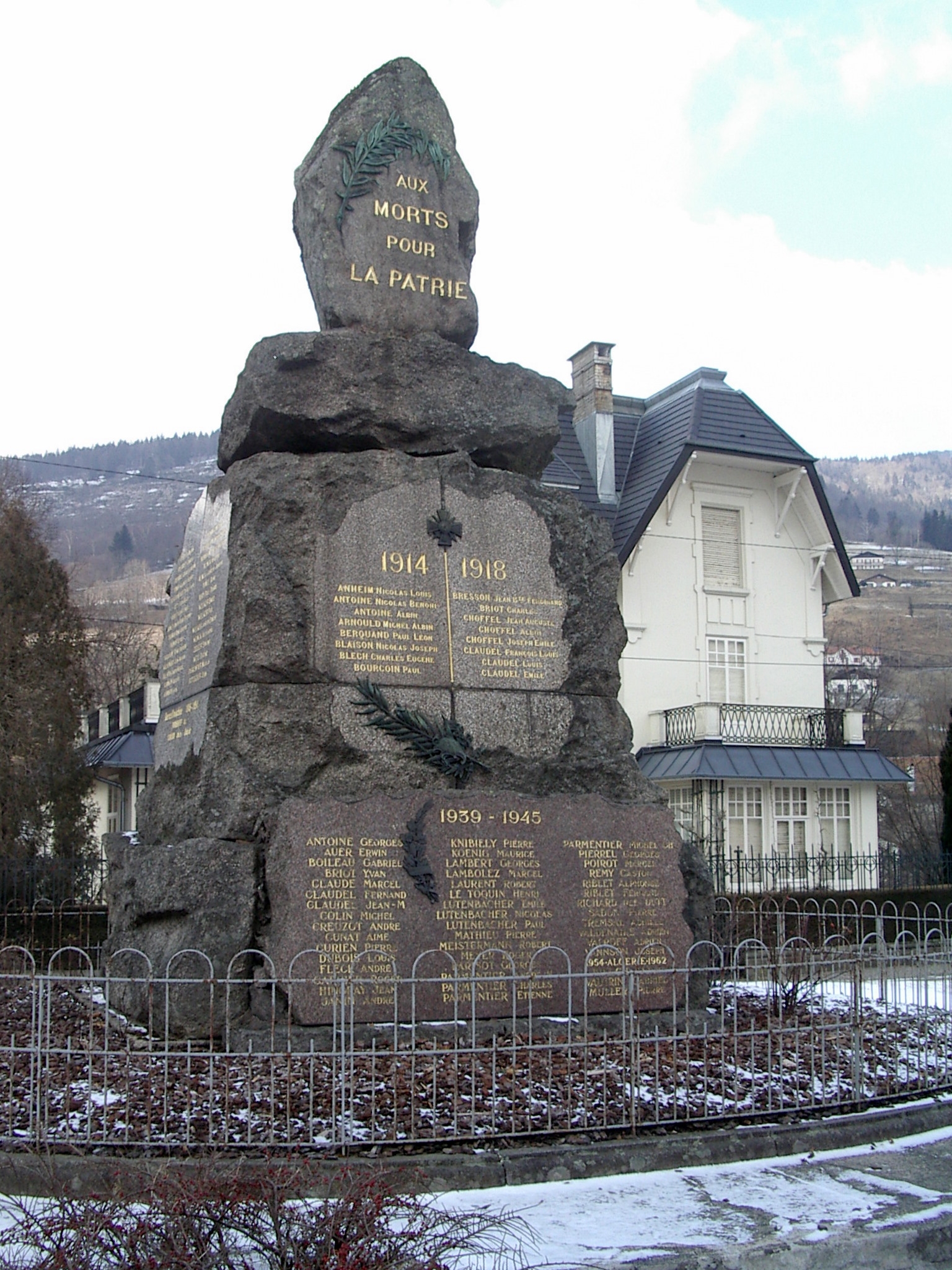
War memorial. Conflicts commemorated: World Wars 1914-1918 - 1939-1945.

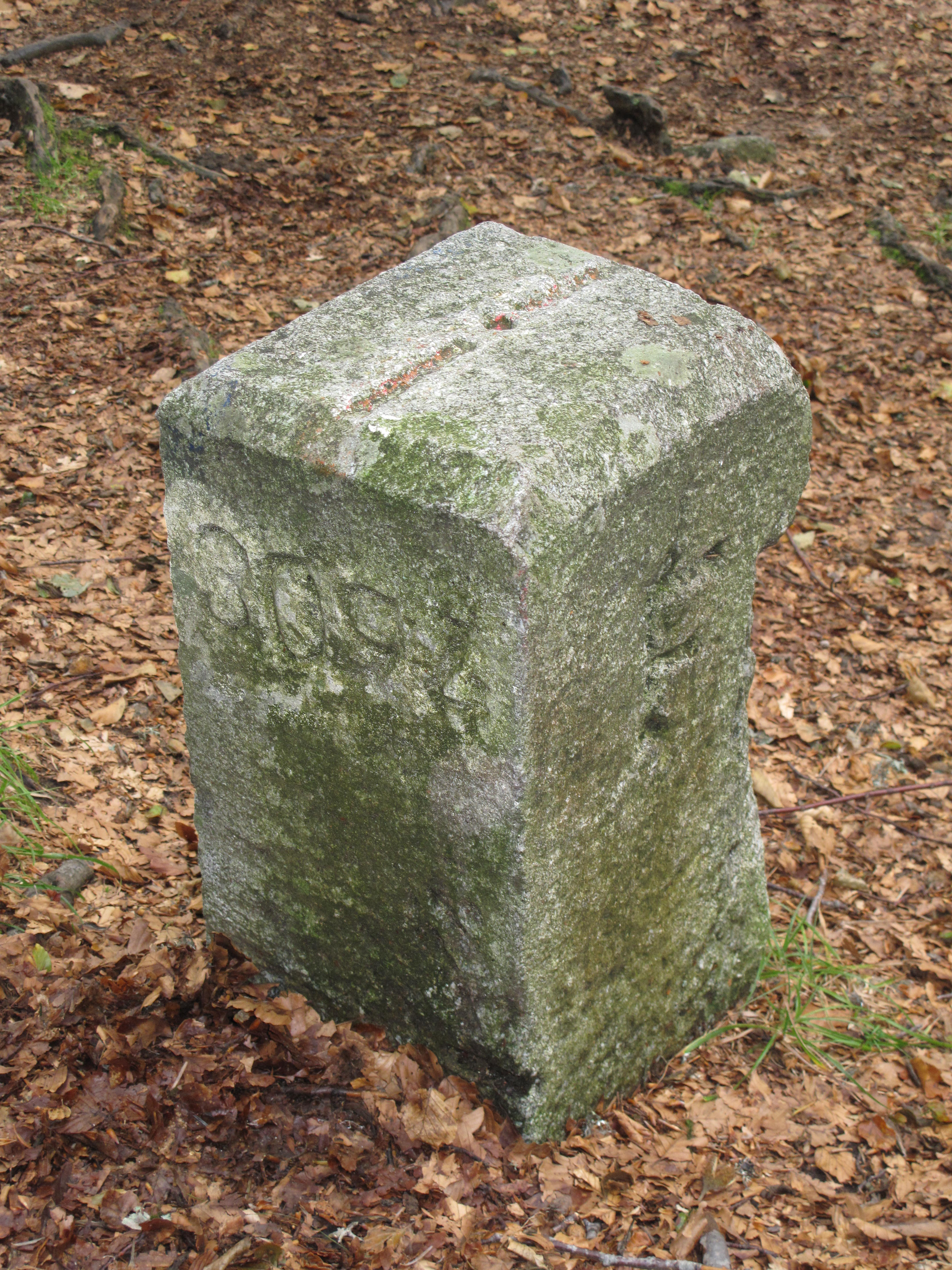
Boundary marker indicating the former border between France and Germany during the German occupation of Alsace-Lorraine (1871-1918).

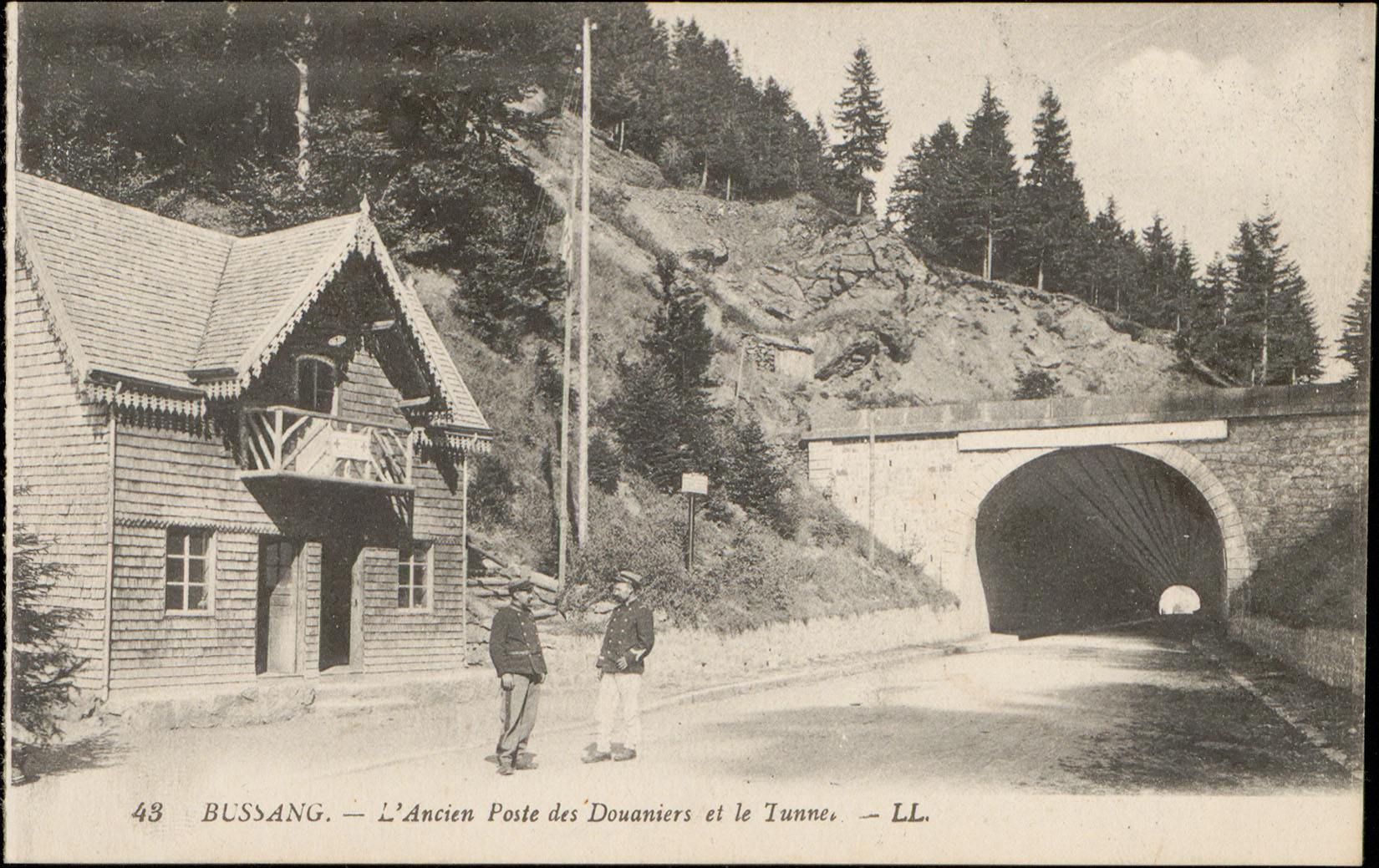
The Old Customs Post and the Tunnel, between 1880 and 1945.

=== Théâtre du Peuple ===
The Théâtre du Peuple (People's Theatre) was founded by Maurice Pottecher in 1895. Built entirely of wood, the theatre has the unique feature of opening onto the backstage, offering an unusual, natural, mountain setting. Several of Maurice Pottecher's plays, performed at the Théâtre du Peuple, have been published. The plays presented during the summer season have featured both professional and amateur actors since its inception.

It has been listed as a historical monument since August 2, 1976.

This theatre served as a model for numerous popular theatre experiments in France, such as the one in Courçay (1906, 1908) in Indre-et-Loire.

No plays were performed at the Théâtre du Peuple during the Second World War.

==== Spring of the Moselle ====
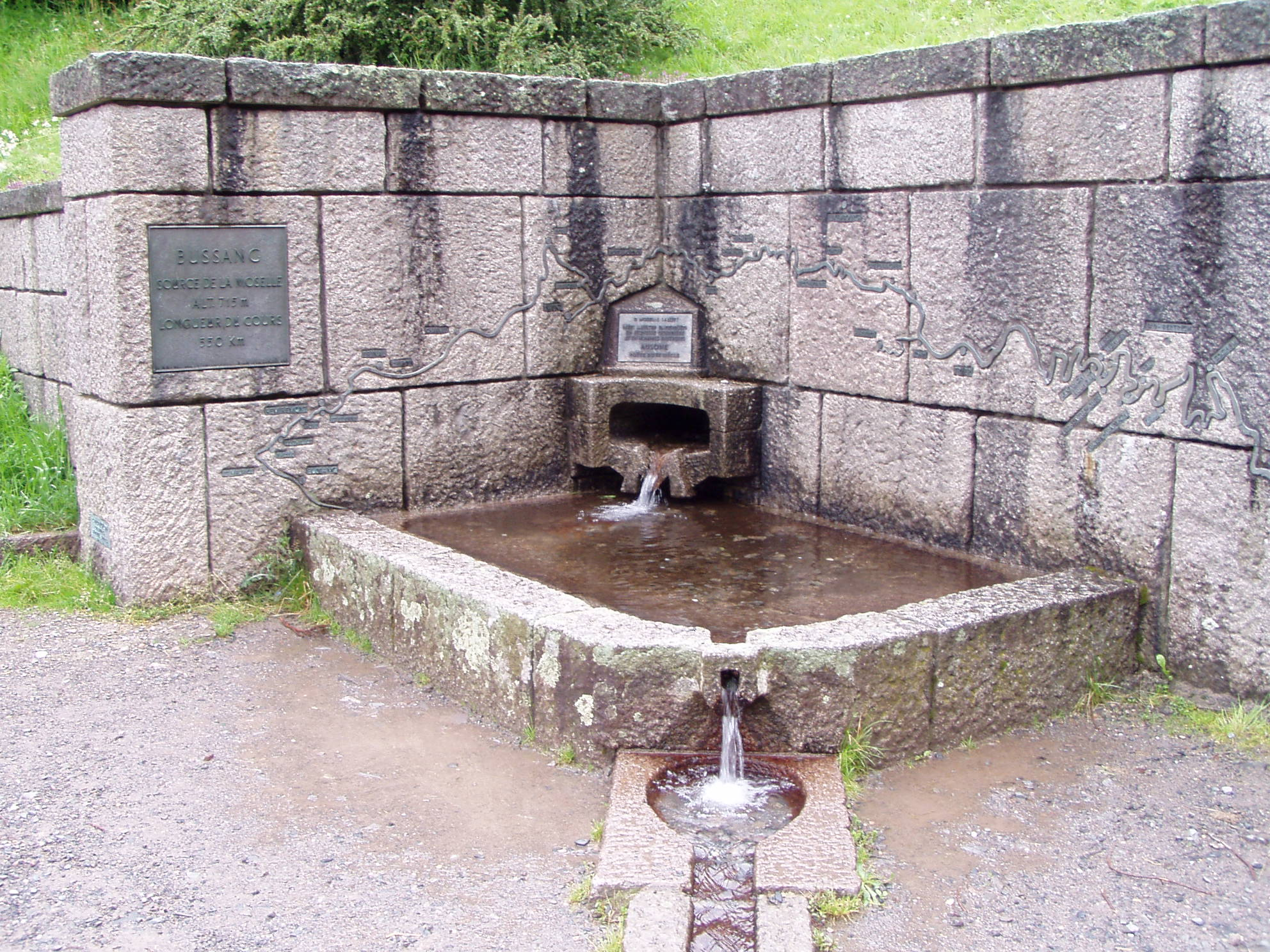
The spring of the Moselle

A spring located at an altitude of 731 meters, near the Bussang Pass, is presented as the official source, but the Moselle River is formed by the confluence of several streams, some of which rise at over 1,000 meters on the slopes of the Grand Drumont.

The river's total length is 560 km, of which 313 km are in France, 39 km form the border between Luxembourg and Germany, and 208 km are entirely within Germany.

The governments' interest in the economic and ecological importance of the Moselle was further demonstrated by Decree No. 62-1006 of August 18, 1962, which published the "Protocol between France, Germany, and Luxembourg concerning the establishment of an international commission for the protection of the Moselle against pollution."

==== Miscellaneous ====
- The 18th-century Church of Saint Barbara, with its original monastic furnishings and 1838 organ; the 18th-century presbytery, also located behind the church, was destroyed in 2019;
- The casino, inaugurated on November 8, 2006, clad in wood like the theater;
- Commemorative monuments;
- Numerous crosses: the Fresse Cross, the Grosjean Cross, the Plague Victims' Cross;
- Statue of Saint Barbara;
- Bear Waterfall;
- Bussang, a sporting town, boasts:
  - 8 downhill ski runs (1 black, 1 red, 3 blue, 3 green), 42 snow cannons, and a beginner ski jump at Larcenaire with 4 ski lifts;
  - 3 downhill ski runs at La Bouloie with 3 ski lifts (closed since 2010);
  - 1 municipal cross-country ski trail near Larcenaire with 5 circuits;
  - 1 50m ski jump at La Bouloie, currently being dismantled;
  - the first toboggan run in the Vosges Mountains, 1.5 km long, at La Bouloie (on a former road closed to traffic, groomed and secured);
  - the first via ferrata in the Vosges Mountains, created in July 2007 by the town. This free via ferrata is easy, ideal for beginners. It is also called "Rando-ferrata of the source of the Moselle"
  - has a multi-activity route called "Voie verte des Hautes-Vosges" developed on the 53 km of the old railway lines of the Moselle-Moselotte valleys,
  - the hydraulic frame sawmills and the marcaires.

== Heraldry ==
Arms of Bussang	Quarterly: 1st gules a chalet proper, 2nd or a trout contourned proper bent in bend, 3rd or a fir tree vert eradicated of the same (sable), 4th gules two mountains vert (sable) the snow-capped peaks argent between which winds a river azure. Comments: Created around 1907 by Benjamin Pottecher, then the first magistrate of the commune, it represents the natural environment: the mountain farm, the trout of the streams, the fir tree of the forests and the nascent Moselle.

== See also ==
- Communes of the Vosges department
