= Ferdrupt =

- Commune
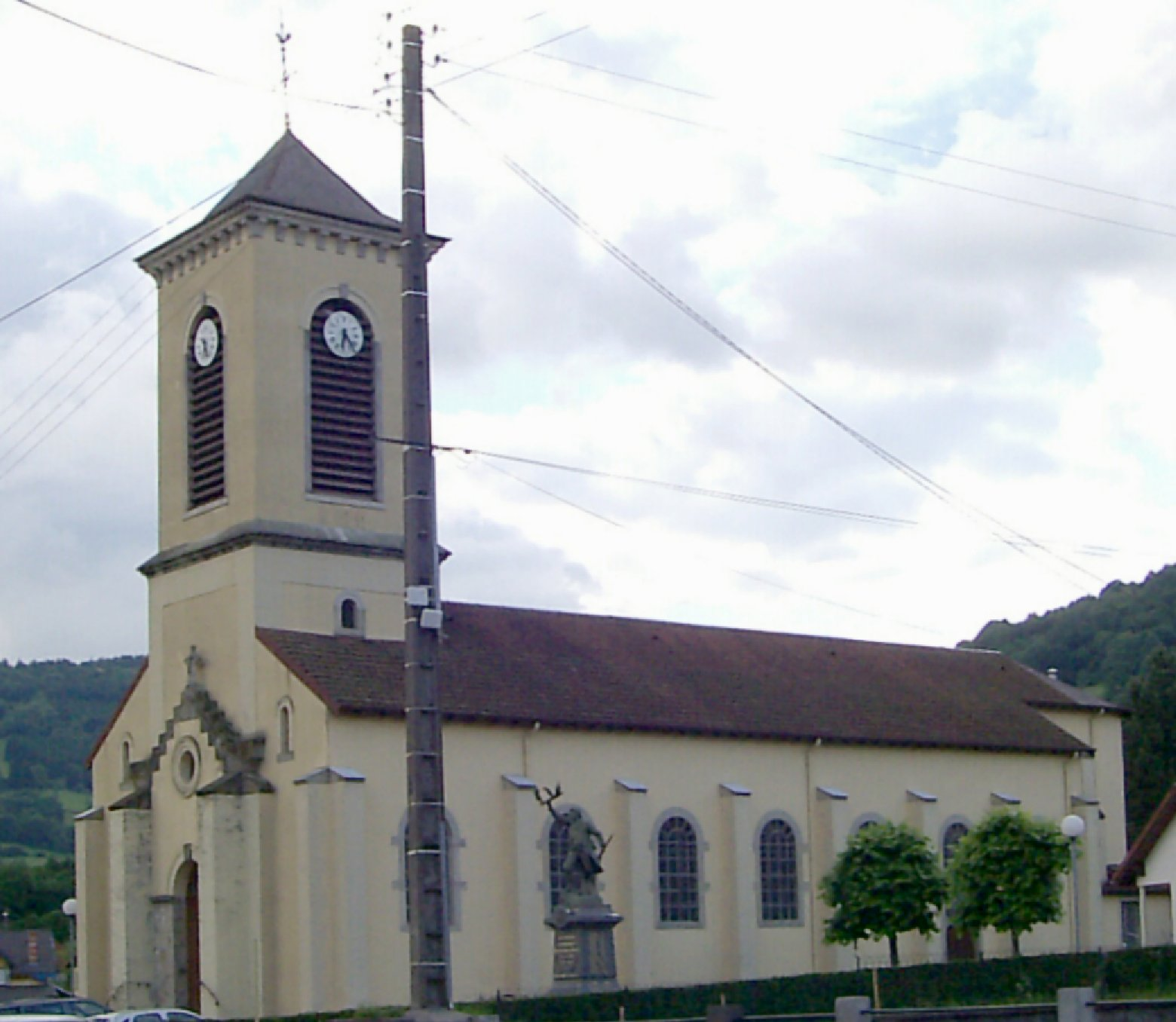
- Church of Saint-Vincent-de-Paul
- Location of Ferdrupt
- Location within France Location within Grand Est
- Coordinates: 47°54′30″N 6°42′36″E
- Country: France
- Region: Grand Est
- Department: Vosges
- Arrondissement: Épinal
- Canton: Le Thillot
- Intercommunality: CC Ballons des Hautes-Vosges

Government
  - Mayor (2020–2026): Étienne Colin
- Area^{1}: 14.6 km^{2} (5.6 sq mi)
- Highest elevation: 903 m (2,963 ft)
- Lowest elevation: 444 m (1,457 ft)
- Population (2023): 738
  - Density: 50.5/km^{2} (131/sq mi)
- Time zone: UTC+01:00 (CET)
  - Summer (DST): UTC+02:00 (CEST)
- INSEE/Postal code: 88170 /88360
- ^{1} French Land Register data, which excludes lakes, ponds, glaciers > 1 km^{2} (0.386 sq mi or 247 acres) and river estuaries.

Ferdrupt (French pronunciation: [fɛʁdʁy]) is a commune in the Vosges department in Grand Est in northeastern France.

== See also ==
- Communes of the Vosges department
