= Saint-Maurice-sur-Moselle =

- Commune
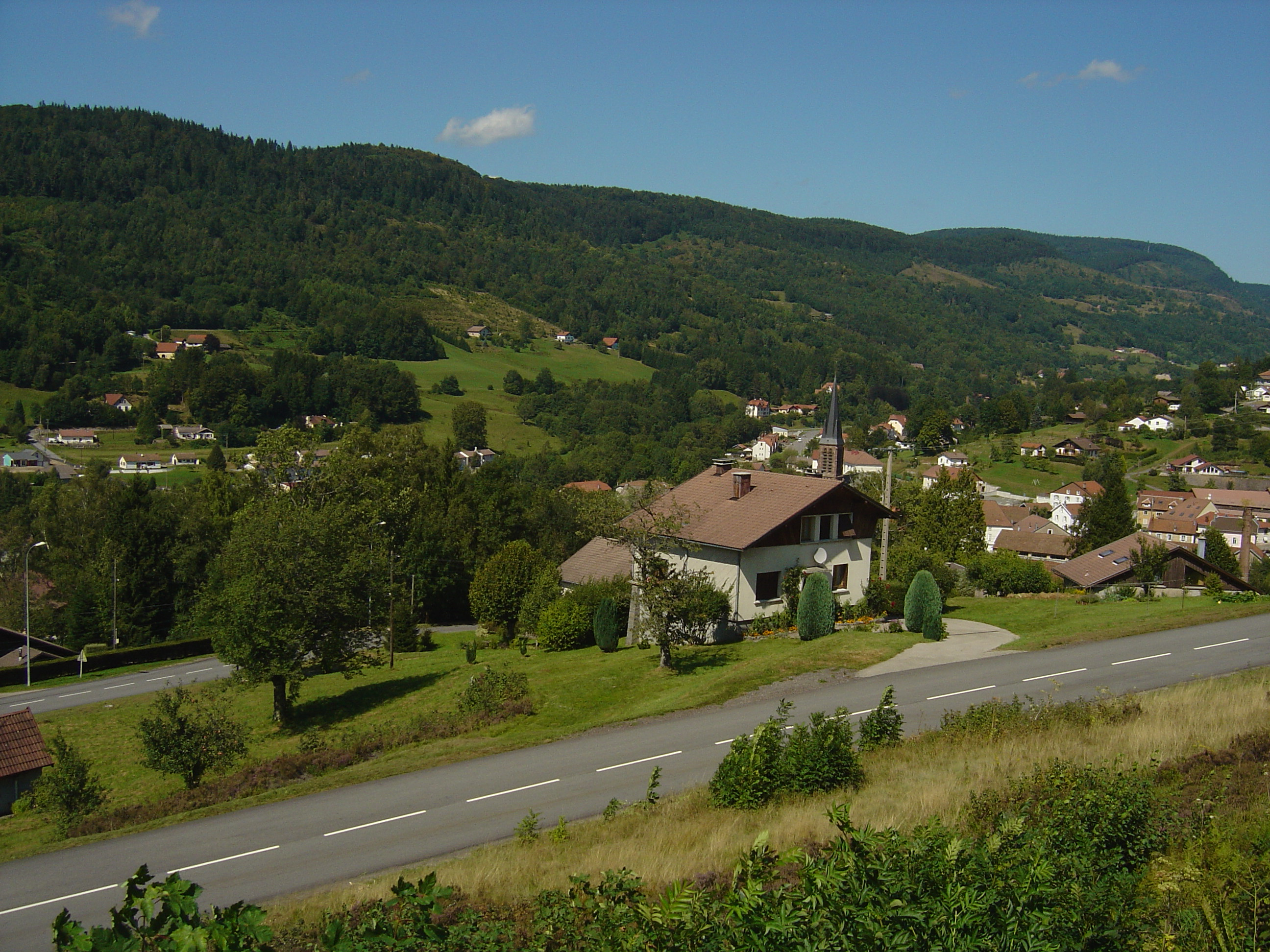
- A general view of Saint-Maurice-sur-Moselle

- Coat of arms
- Location of Saint-Maurice-sur-Moselle
- Location within France Location within Grand Est
- Coordinates: 47°51′31″N 6°49′29″E
- Country: France
- Region: Grand Est
- Department: Vosges
- Arrondissement: Épinal
- Canton: Le Thillot
- Intercommunality: Ballons des Hautes-Vosges

Government
  - Mayor (2020–2026): Thierry Rigollet
- Area^{1}: 37 km^{2} (14 sq mi)
- Highest elevation: 1,251 m (4,104 ft)
- Lowest elevation: 530 m (1,740 ft)
- Population (2023): 1,306
  - Density: 35/km^{2} (91/sq mi)
- Demonym(s): Fremis, Fremises
- Time zone: UTC+01:00 (CET)
  - Summer (DST): UTC+02:00 (CEST)
- INSEE/Postal code: 88426 /88560
- ^{1} French Land Register data, which excludes lakes, ponds, glaciers > 1 km^{2} (0.386 sq mi or 247 acres) and river estuaries.

Saint-Maurice-sur-Moselle (French pronunciation: [sɛ̃ mɔʁis syʁ mɔzɛl]; literally "Saint-Maurice on Moselle") is a commune in the Vosges department in Grand Est in northeastern France.

== Population ==
Historical population
Year	Pop.	±% p.a.
1968	1,878	—
1975	1,845	−0.25%
1982	1,768	−0.61%
1990	1,615	−1.13%
1999	1,449	−1.20%
2007	1,502	+0.45%
2012	1,463	−0.52%
2017	1,404	−0.82%
2023	1,306	−1.20%
Source: INSEE

== See also ==
- Communes of the Vosges department
