= Le Thillot =

- Commune
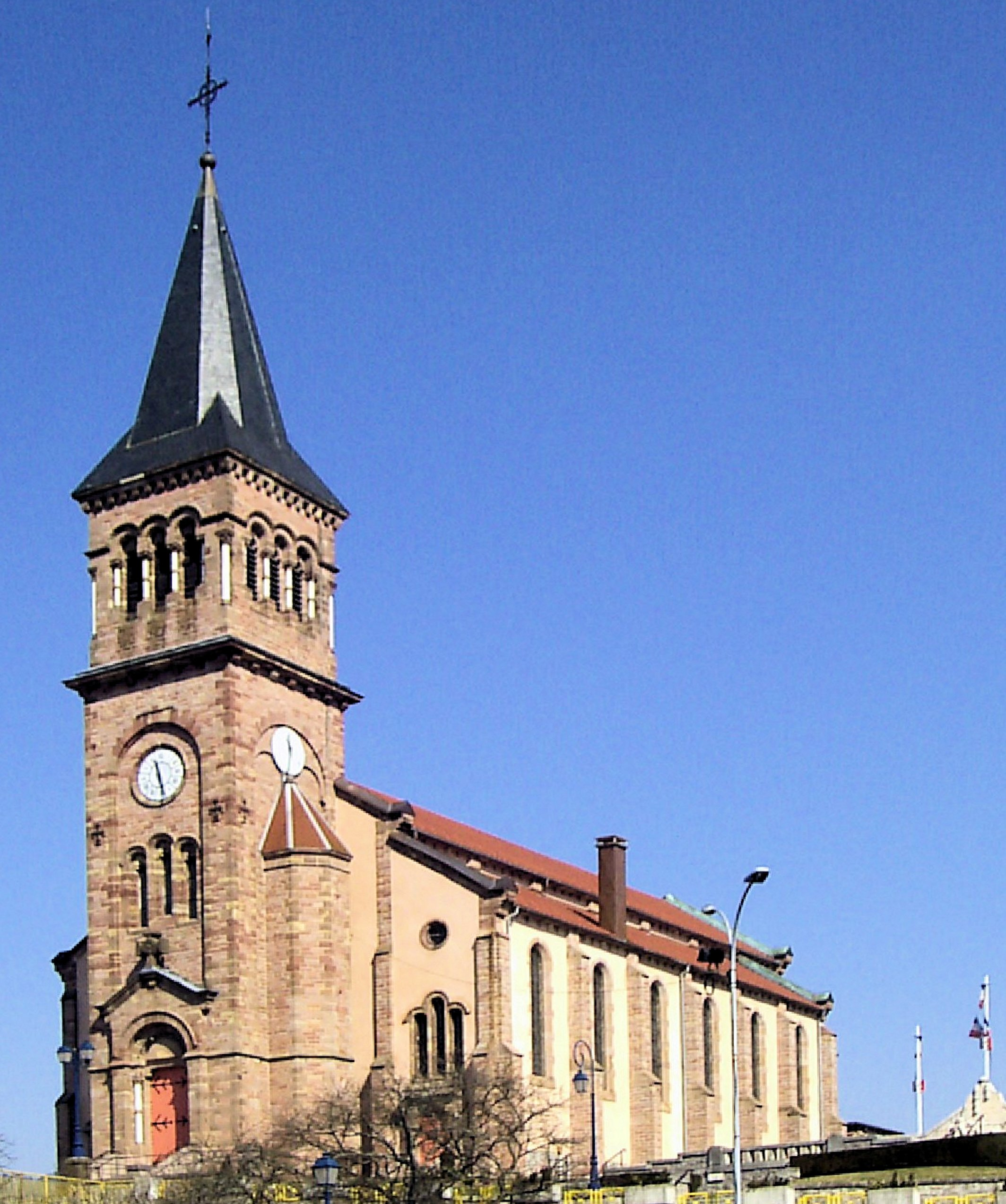
- Saint-Jean-Baptiste

- Coat of arms
- Location of Le Thillot
- Location within France Location within Grand Est
- Coordinates: 47°52′51″N 6°45′57″E
- Country: France
- Region: Grand Est
- Department: Vosges
- Arrondissement: Épinal
- Canton: Le Thillot
- Intercommunality: CC Ballons des Hautes-Vosges

Government
  - Mayor (2023–2026): Isabelle Canonaco
- Area^{1}: 15.14 km^{2} (5.85 sq mi)
- Highest elevation: 950 m (3,120 ft)
- Lowest elevation: 468 m (1,535 ft)
- Population (2023): 3,167
  - Density: 209.2/km^{2} (541.8/sq mi)
- Time zone: UTC+01:00 (CET)
  - Summer (DST): UTC+02:00 (CEST)
- INSEE/Postal code: 88468 /88160
- ^{1} French Land Register data, which excludes lakes, ponds, glaciers > 1 km^{2} (0.386 sq mi or 247 acres) and river estuaries.

Le Thillot (French pronunciation: [lə tijo]) is a commune in the Vosges department in Grand Est in northeastern France.

== Population ==
Historical population
Year	Pop.	±% p.a.
1968	4,577	—
1975	5,114	+1.60%
1982	4,860	−0.73%
1990	4,246	−1.67%
1999	3,945	−0.81%
2007	3,760	−0.60%
2012	3,624	−0.73%
2017	3,438	−1.05%
2023	3,167	−1.36%
Source: INSEE

== See also ==
- Communes of the Vosges department
