= Meuse Canal =

Canal in France

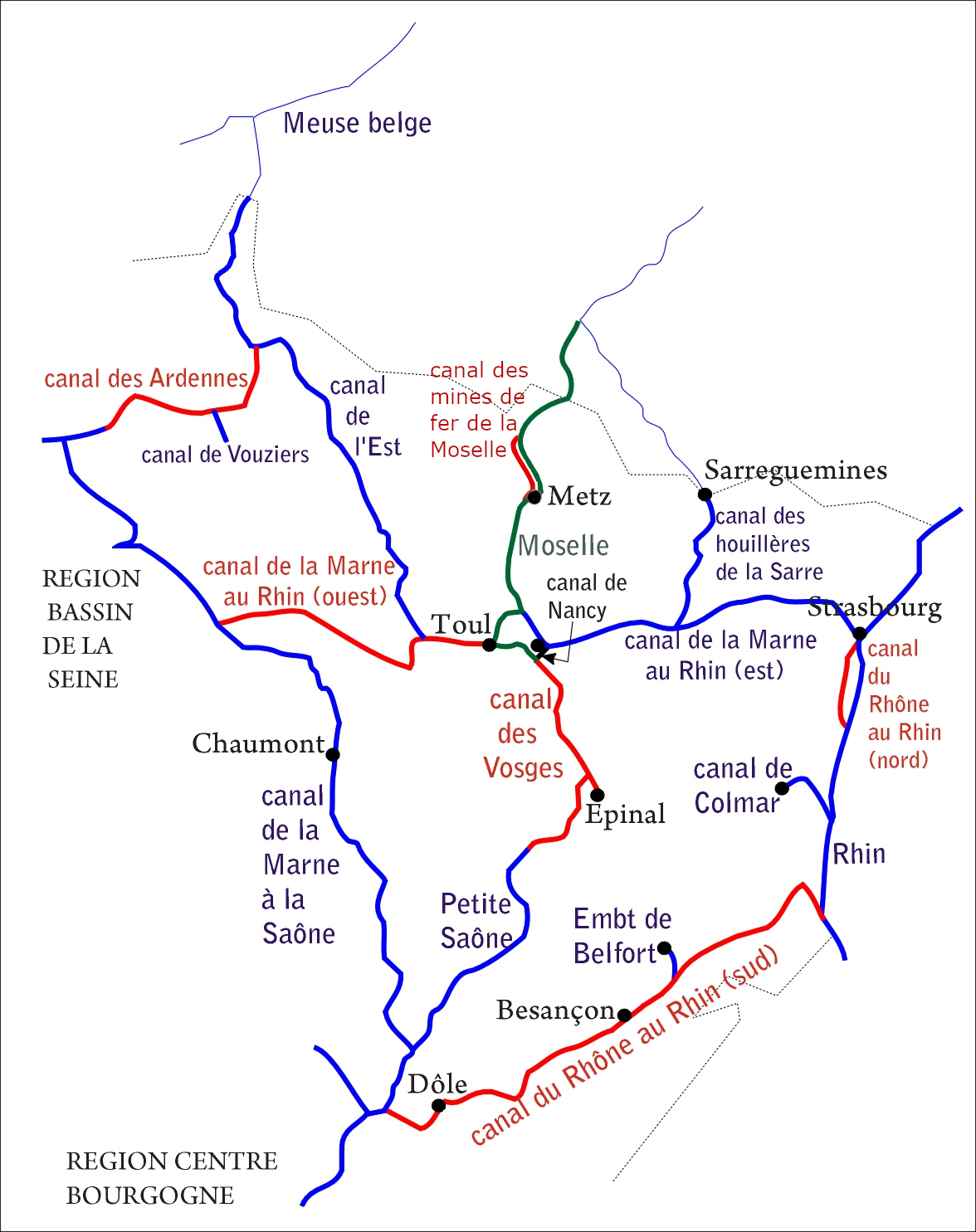
Canal de l'Est in the waterway network in eastern France.

The Canal de la Meuse (French pronunciation: [kanal də la møz]) is the current name of what used to be the northern branch of the Canal de l'Est ("canal of the east"). It is a canal in northeastern France, predominantly made up of the canalised river Meuse. The Canal de l'Est was built from 1874 to 1887 to provide a waterway inside the new border with Prussia after the Franco-Prussian War, Overall, the canal had a total length of 394 kilometres (245 mi). In 2003, the northern and southern branches were officially renamed Canal de la Meuse and Canal des Vosges respectively.

== Canal de la Meuse (formerly Canal de l'Est, northern branch) ==
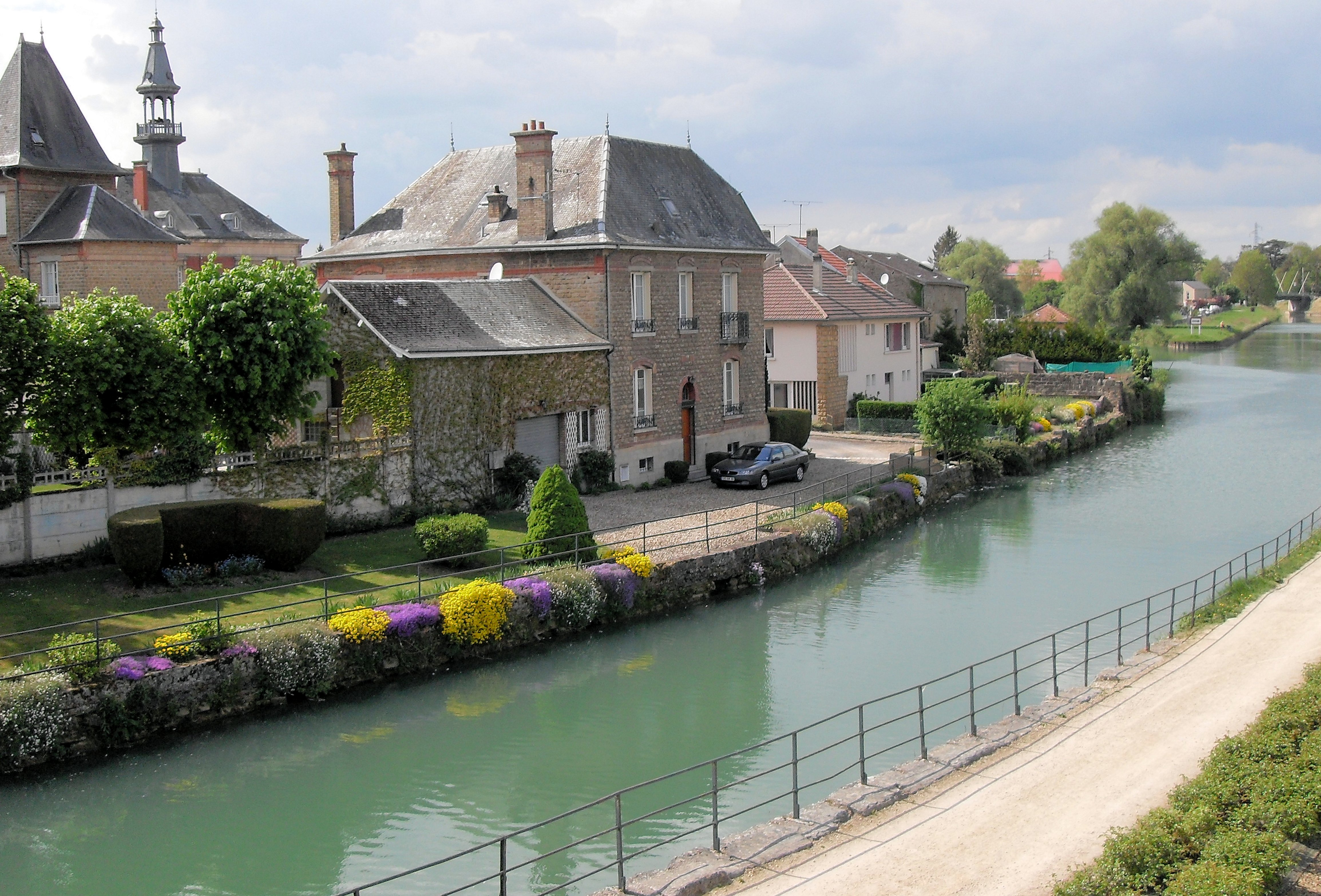
Canal de la Meuse at Mouzon

The Canal de la Meuse starts at Givet in the Ardennes département. It follows the Meuse upstream, passing through Mouzon, Fumay, Revin, Nouzonville, Charleville-Mézières, Sedan, Stenay, Verdun, Saint-Mihiel and Commercy, and joins the Canal de la Marne au Rhin at Troussey. This canal is 272 kilometres (169 mi) long. For most of its length, the canal is the canalised river Meuse.

== Canal des Vosges (formerly southern branch) ==
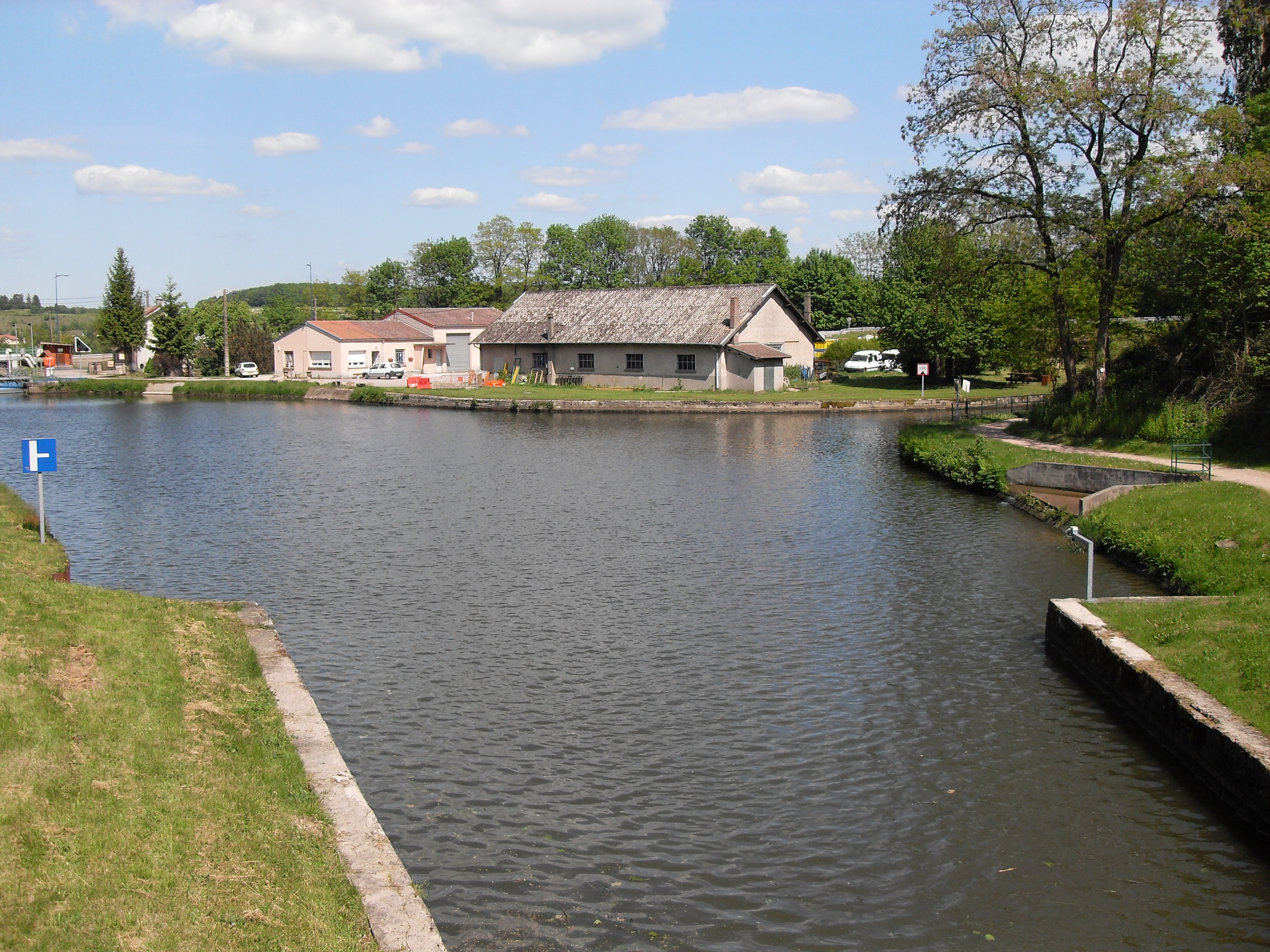
Canal des Vosges at Golbey

Originally, the southern branch of the Canal de l'Est started at Toul, where it branched off the Canal de la Marne au Rhin. Since the Moselle has been made navigable for high-capacity barges up to Neuves-Maisons, the 27-kilometre (17 mi) part of the Canal de l'Est between Toul and Neuves-Maisons is considered part of the Moselle. The canal follows the Moselle upstream through Charmes and Thaon-les-Vosges until Golbey, north of Épinal, where it leaves the Moselle valley. It passes through Les Forges and enters the valley of the Côney near Uzemain. It follows the Côney downstream until its confluence with the Saône at Corre in the Haute-Saône department, the southern end of the Canal de l'Est. This branch of the canal is 123 kilometres (76 mi) long.

== Geographic latitude and longitude ==
branch	commune	latitude and longitude
northern	Givet	50.165339°N 4.823090°E
northern	Fumay	49.995027°N 4.704711°E
northern	Revin	49.940532°N 4.638501°E
northern	Nouzonville	49.816795°N 4.741077°E
northern	Charleville-Mézières	49.759734°N 4.724509°E
northern	Sedan	49.701676°N 4.935798°E
northern	Mouzon	49.609429°N 5.072111°E
northern	Stenay	49.489465°N 5.182199°E
northern	Verdun	49.153179°N 5.383668°E
northern	Saint-Mihiel	48.888597°N 5.536481°E
northern	Commercy	48.765725°N 5.595111°E
northern	Troussey	48.714535°N 5.690091°E
southern	Toul	48.683183°N 5.906358°E
southern	Neuves-Maisons	48.606976°N 6.108320°E
southern	Charmes	48.374052°N 6.295253°E
southern	Thaon-les-Vosges	48.247316°N 6.425521°E
southern	Golbey	48.209058°N 6.439801°E
southern	Les Forges	48.181601°N 6.390107°E
southern	Uzemain	48.106896°N 6.315748°E
southern	Corre	47.911417°N 5.994600°E

== See also ==
- List of canals in France
