= Alaincourt =

Alaincourt may refer to:

- Alaincourt, Aisne, a commune of the Aisne département in France
- Alaincourt, Haute-Saône, a commune of the Haute-Saône département in France

== See also ==
- Alaincourt-la-Côte, a commune of the Moselle département in France
