= Selles, Haute-Saône =

Selles
- Commune
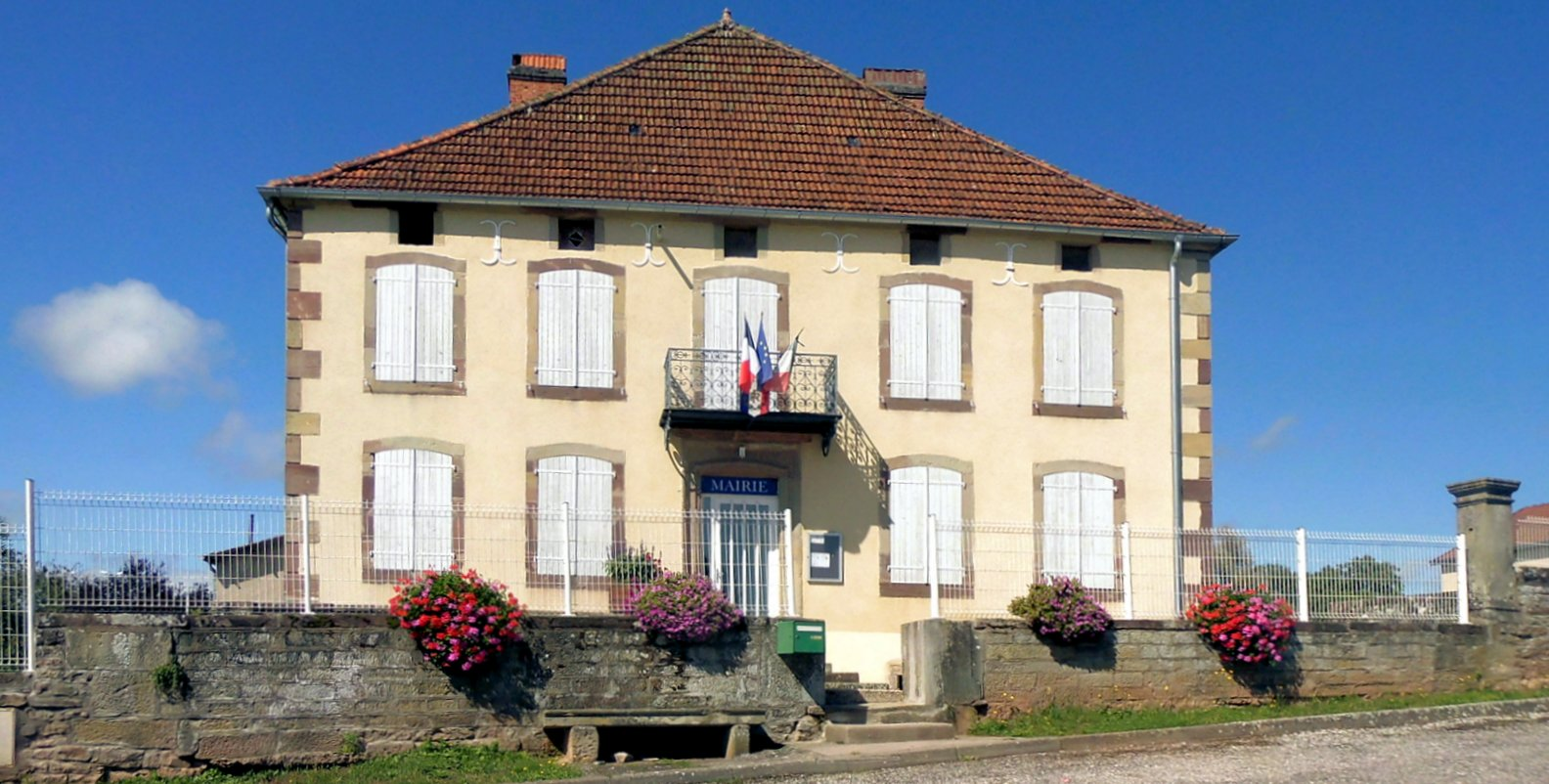
- The town hall in Selles
- Location of Selles
- Location within France Location within Bourgogne-Franche-Comté
- Coordinates: 47°57′48″N 6°05′19″E
- Country: France
- Region: Bourgogne-Franche-Comté
- Department: Haute-Saône
- Arrondissement: Lure
- Canton: Jussey

Government
  - Mayor (2021–2026): Claude Rague
- Area^{1}: 14.36 km^{2} (5.54 sq mi)
- Highest elevation: 417 m (1,368 ft)
- Lowest elevation: 227 m (745 ft)
- Population (2023): 224
  - Density: 15.6/km^{2} (40.4/sq mi)
- Time zone: UTC+01:00 (CET)
  - Summer (DST): UTC+02:00 (CEST)
- INSEE/Postal code: 70485 /70210
- ^{1} French Land Register data, which excludes lakes, ponds, glaciers > 1 km^{2} (0.386 sq mi or 247 acres) and river estuaries.

Selles (French pronunciation: [sɛl]) is a commune in the Haute-Saône department in the region of Bourgogne-Franche-Comté in eastern France.

The river Côney flows through the village and also the canal de l'Est. The canal can be crossed in Selles using a metal bridge which is opened manually to allow canal boats to pass through. Locally the bridge is known as Le Pont Tournant and there is a restaurant of the same name by the canal.

Visitors to Selles can visit the Jean Roussey cheese factory which has free entry.

The area is characterised by the many springs that emerge from the ground and these are used for drinking and washing even today.

== See also ==
- Communes of the Haute-Saône department
