= Demangevelle =

- Commune
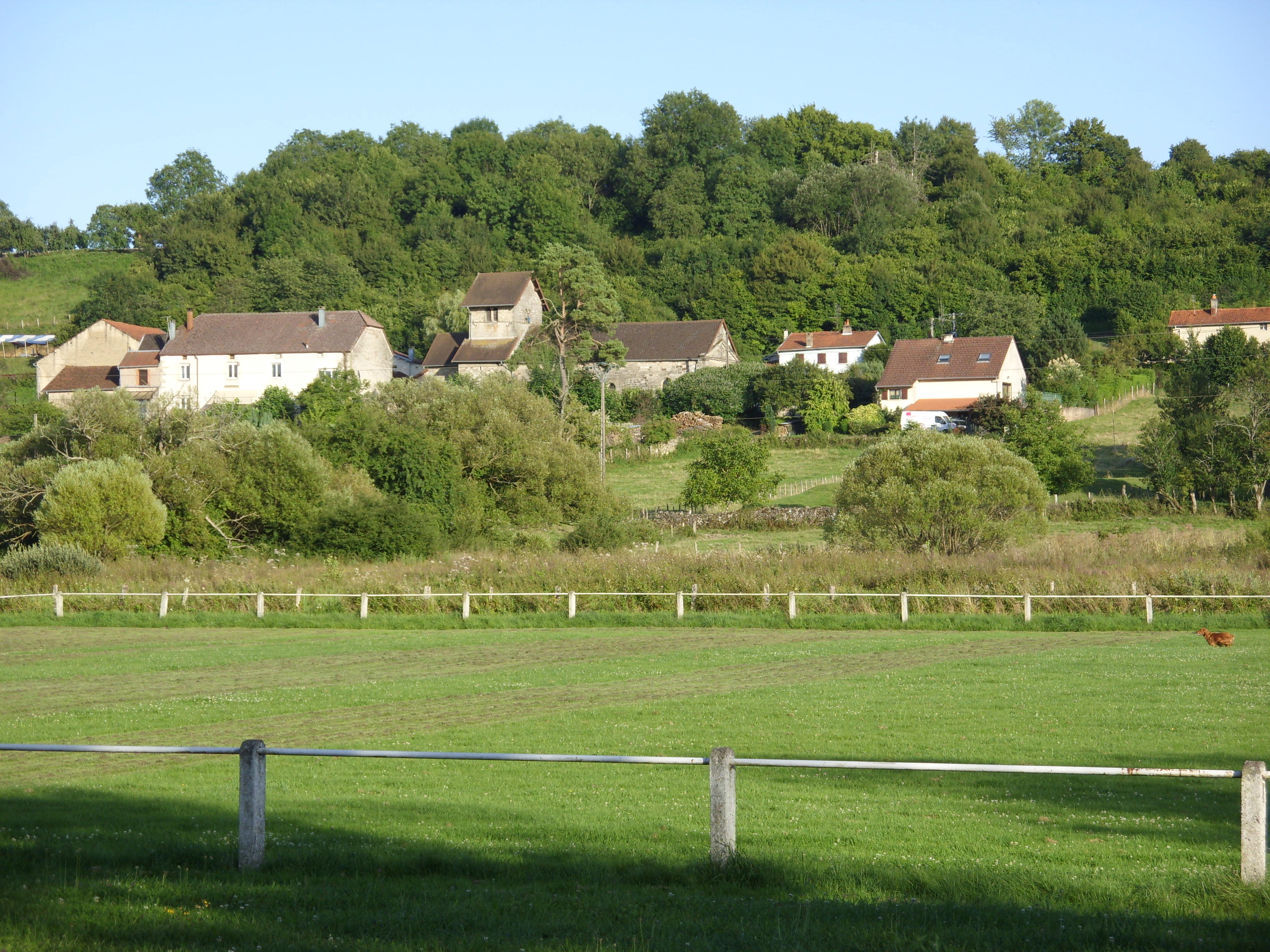
- A general view of Demangevelle

- Coat of arms
- Location of Demangevelle
- Location within France Location within Bourgogne-Franche-Comté
- Coordinates: 47°55′37″N 6°02′06″E
- Country: France
- Region: Bourgogne-Franche-Comté
- Department: Haute-Saône
- Arrondissement: Vesoul
- Canton: Jussey

Government
  - Mayor (2020–2026): Daniel Viney
- Area^{1}: 14.62 km^{2} (5.64 sq mi)
- Highest elevation: 350 m (1,150 ft)
- Lowest elevation: 222 m (728 ft)
- Population (2023): 256
  - Density: 17.5/km^{2} (45.4/sq mi)
- Time zone: UTC+01:00 (CET)
  - Summer (DST): UTC+02:00 (CEST)
- INSEE/Postal code: 70202 /70210
- ^{1} French Land Register data, which excludes lakes, ponds, glaciers > 1 km^{2} (0.386 sq mi or 247 acres) and river estuaries.

Demangevelle (French pronunciation: [dəmɑ̃ʒvɛl]) is a commune in the Haute-Saône department in the region of Bourgogne-Franche-Comté in eastern France.

== Geography ==
The Côney forms part of the commune's north-eastern border, flows south-westward through the middle of the commune, and forms part of the commune's south-western border.

== See also ==
- Communes of the Haute-Saône department
