= Vougécourt =

- Commune
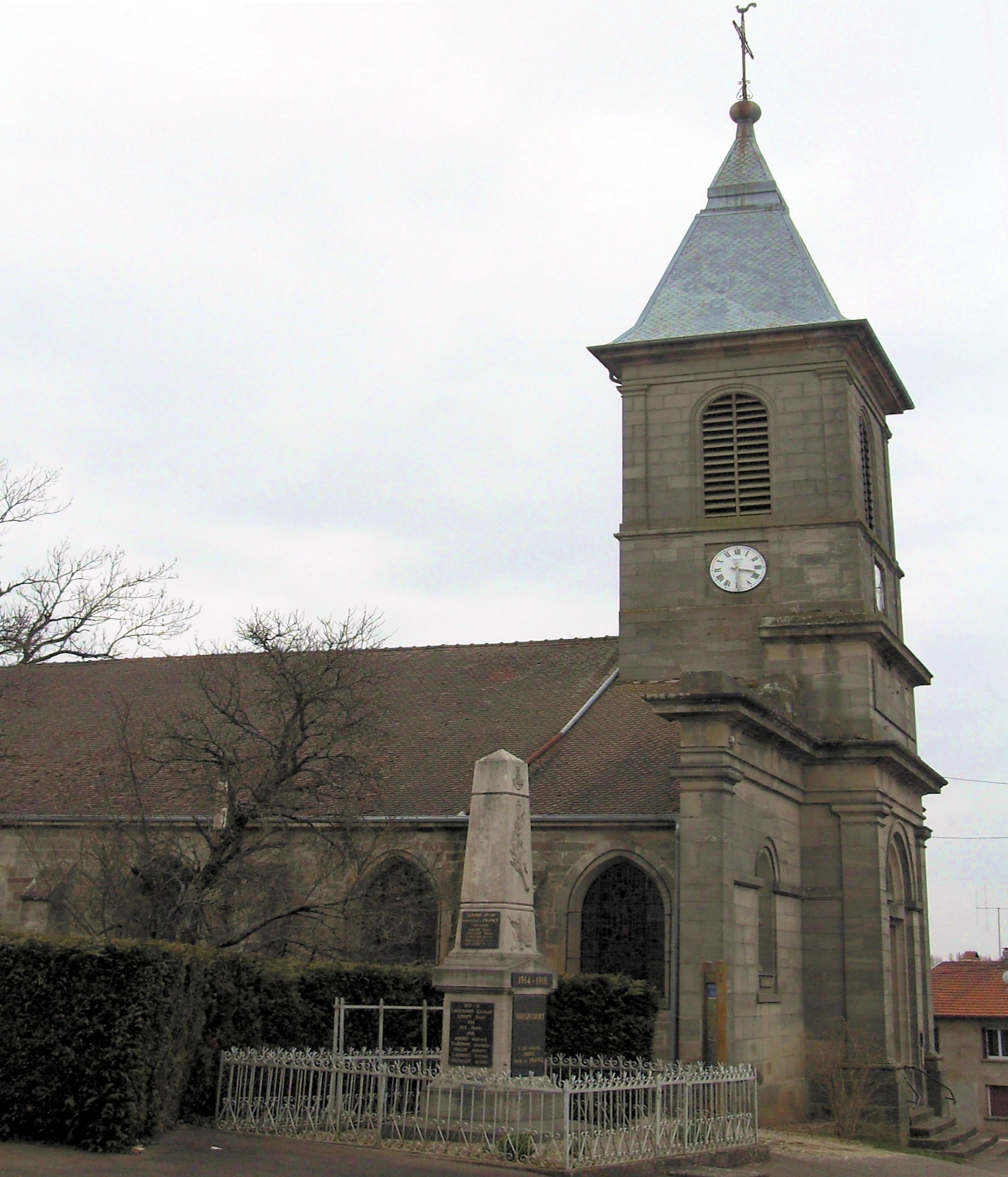
- The church in Vougécourt
- Location of Vougécourt
- Location within France Location within Bourgogne-Franche-Comté
- Coordinates: 47°56′37″N 5°59′39″E
- Country: France
- Region: Bourgogne-Franche-Comté
- Department: Haute-Saône
- Arrondissement: Vesoul
- Canton: Jussey
- Intercommunality: Hauts du Val de Saône

Government
  - Mayor (2020–2026): André Gazillot
- Area^{1}: 8.88 km^{2} (3.43 sq mi)
- Highest elevation: 311 m (1,020 ft)
- Lowest elevation: 222 m (728 ft)
- Population (2023): 168
  - Density: 18.9/km^{2} (49.0/sq mi)
- Time zone: UTC+01:00 (CET)
  - Summer (DST): UTC+02:00 (CEST)
- INSEE/Postal code: 70576 /70500
- ^{1} French Land Register data, which excludes lakes, ponds, glaciers > 1 km^{2} (0.386 sq mi or 247 acres) and river estuaries.

Vougécourt (French pronunciation: [vuʒekuʁ]) is a commune in the Haute-Saône department in the region of Bourgogne-Franche-Comté in eastern France.

== Geography ==
The Côney forms part of the commune's southern border.

== See also ==
- Communes of the Haute-Saône department
