= Côney =

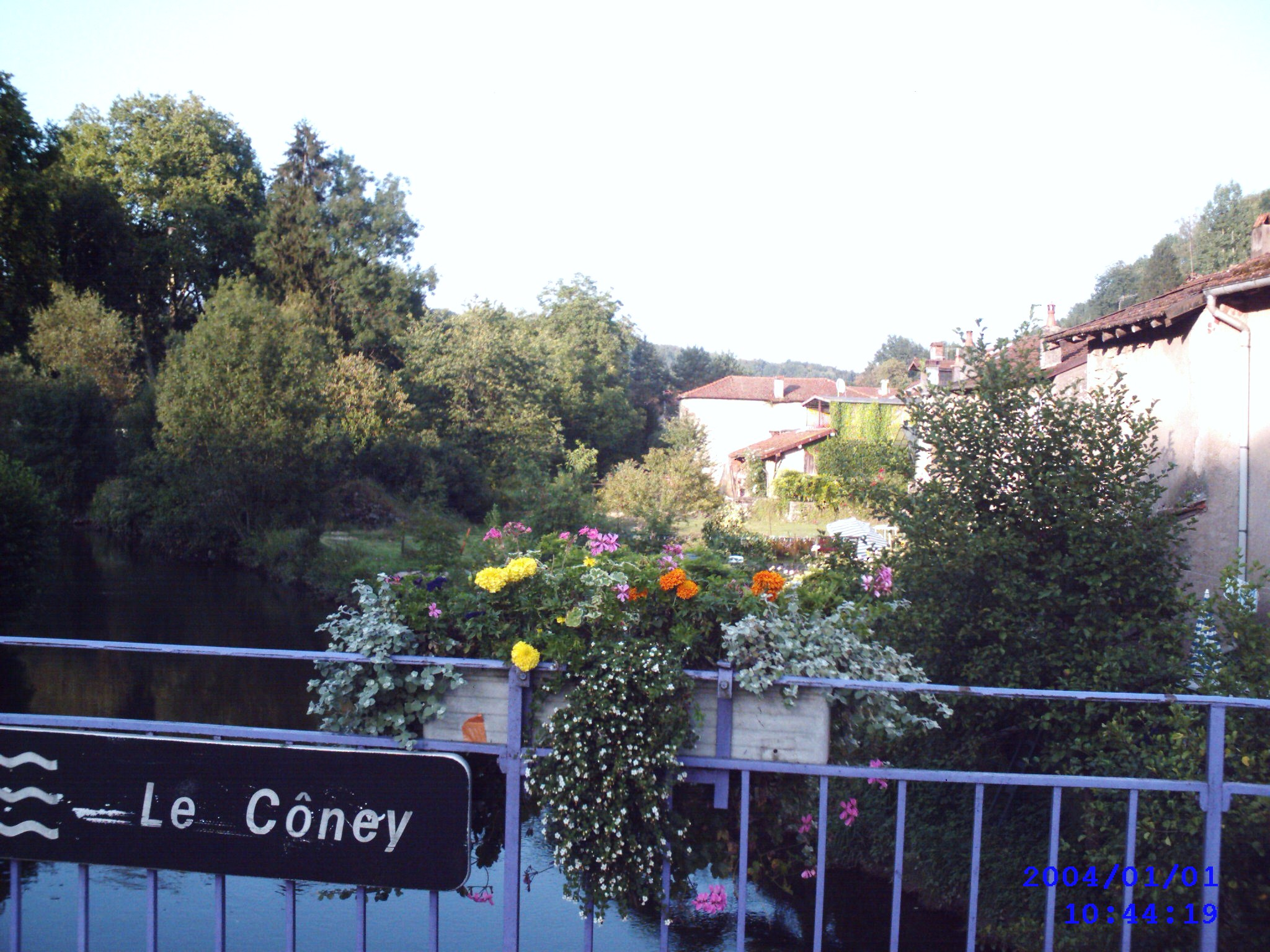
- The Côney at Fontenoy-le-Château

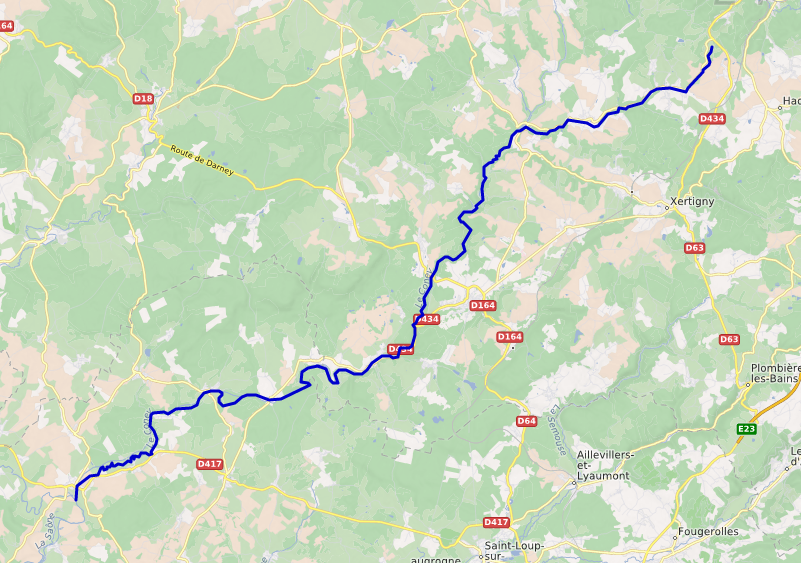

Location
- Country: France

Physical characteristics
- Source
  - location: Dounoux
  - coordinates: 48°07′14″N 06°25′56″E
  - elevation: 425 m (1,394 ft)
- Mouth
  - location: Saône
  - coordinates: 47°54′41″N 05°59′41″E
  - elevation: 220 m (720 ft)
- Length: 55 km (34 mi)
- Basin size: 317 km^{2} (122 sq mi)
- Discharge
  - average: 5.29 m^{3}/s (187 cu ft/s)

Basin features
- Progression: Saône→ Rhône→ Mediterranean Sea

The Côney (French pronunciation: [konɛ]) is a 55.3-kilometre (34.4 mi) long river in the Vosges and Haute-Saône départements, northeastern France. Its source is near Lion Faing, a lieu-dit in Dounoux. It flows generally southwest. It is a left tributary of the Saône into which it flows in Corre.

It shares its valley with the canal de l'Est on most of its course.

== Départements and communes along its course ==
This list is ordered from source to mouth:

- Vosges: Dounoux, Uriménil, Uzemain, Xertigny, Charmois-l'Orgueilleux, La Chapelle-aux-Bois, Harsault, Les Voivres, Hautmougey, Bains-les-Bains, Fontenoy-le-Château, Le Magny, Montmotier,
- Haute-Saône: Ambiévillers, Mailleroncourt-Saint-Pancras, Pont-du-Bois, Alaincourt, Selles, La Basse-Vaivre, Passavant-la-Rochère, Demangevelle, Vougécourt, Corre,
