= Chantraine =

- Commune
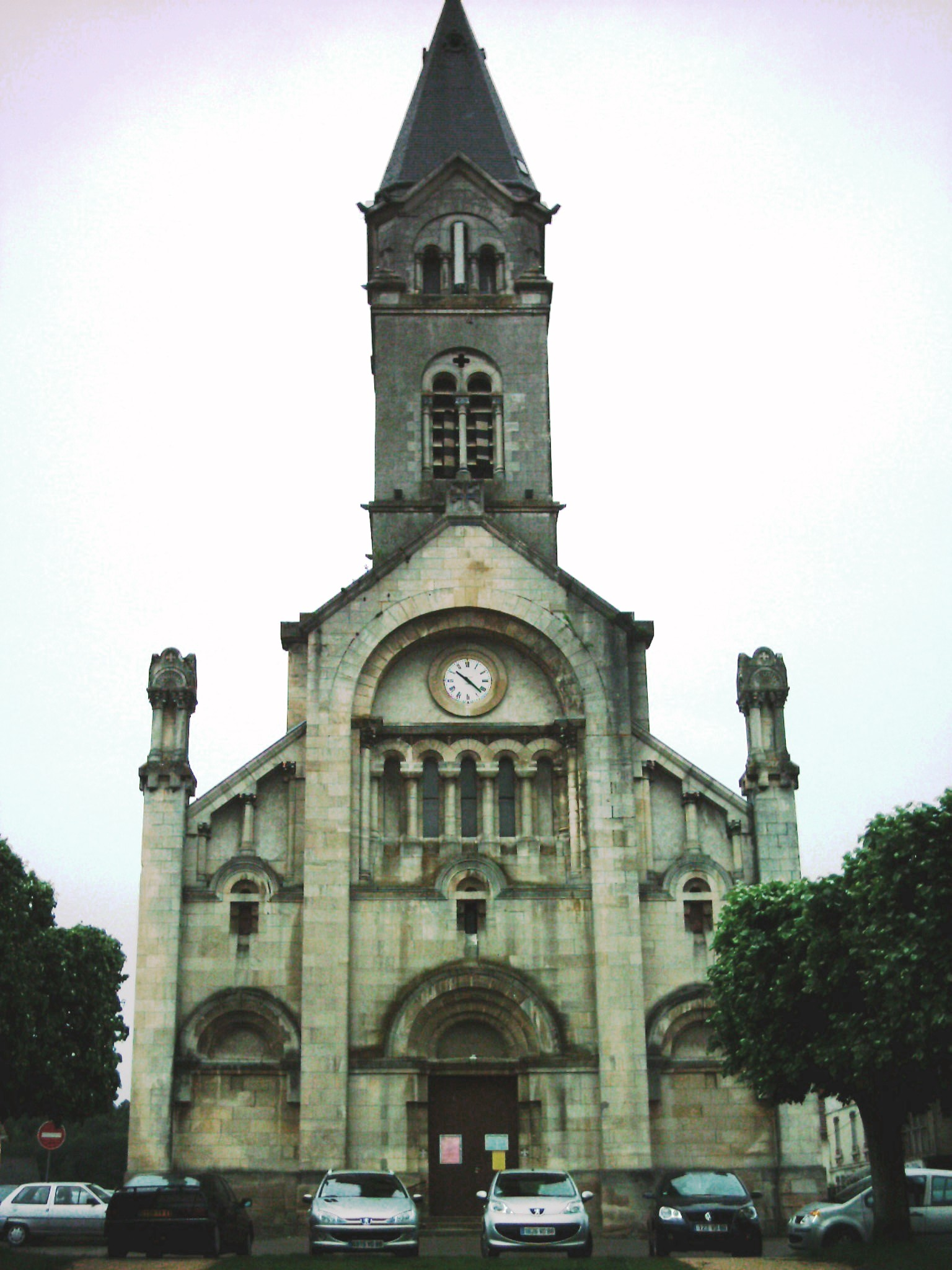
- Saint-Pierre Fourier

- Coat of arms
- Location of Chantraine
- Location within France Location within Grand Est
- Coordinates: 48°10′14″N 6°26′33″E
- Country: France
- Region: Grand Est
- Department: Vosges
- Arrondissement: Épinal
- Canton: Épinal-1
- Intercommunality: CA Épinal

Government
  - Mayor (2020–2026): Marc Barbaux
- Area^{1}: 6.2 km^{2} (2.4 sq mi)
- Highest elevation: 486 m (1,594 ft)
- Lowest elevation: 330 m (1,080 ft)
- Population (2023): 3,198
  - Density: 520/km^{2} (1,300/sq mi)
- Time zone: UTC+01:00 (CET)
  - Summer (DST): UTC+02:00 (CEST)
- INSEE/Postal code: 88087 /88000
- ^{1} French Land Register data, which excludes lakes, ponds, glaciers > 1 km^{2} (0.386 sq mi or 247 acres) and river estuaries.

Chantraine (French pronunciation: [ʃɑ̃tʁɛn]) is a commune in the Vosges department in Grand Est in northeastern France.

== Population ==
Historical population
| Year | Pop. | ±% p.a. |
|---|---|---|
| 1968 | 2,998 | — |
| 1975 | 3,083 | +0.40% |
| 1982 | 2,972 | −0.52% |
| 1990 | 2,843 | −0.55% |
| 1999 | 3,052 | +0.79% |
| 2007 | 3,029 | −0.09% |
| 2012 | 3,161 | +0.86% |
| 2017 | 3,212 | +0.32% |
| 2023 | 3,198 | −0.07% |
Source: INSEE

== Twin towns – sister cities ==
Chantraine is twinned with:

- Cantarana, Italy (2007)

== See also ==
- Communes of the Vosges department
