= Charmois-l'Orgueilleux =

- Commune
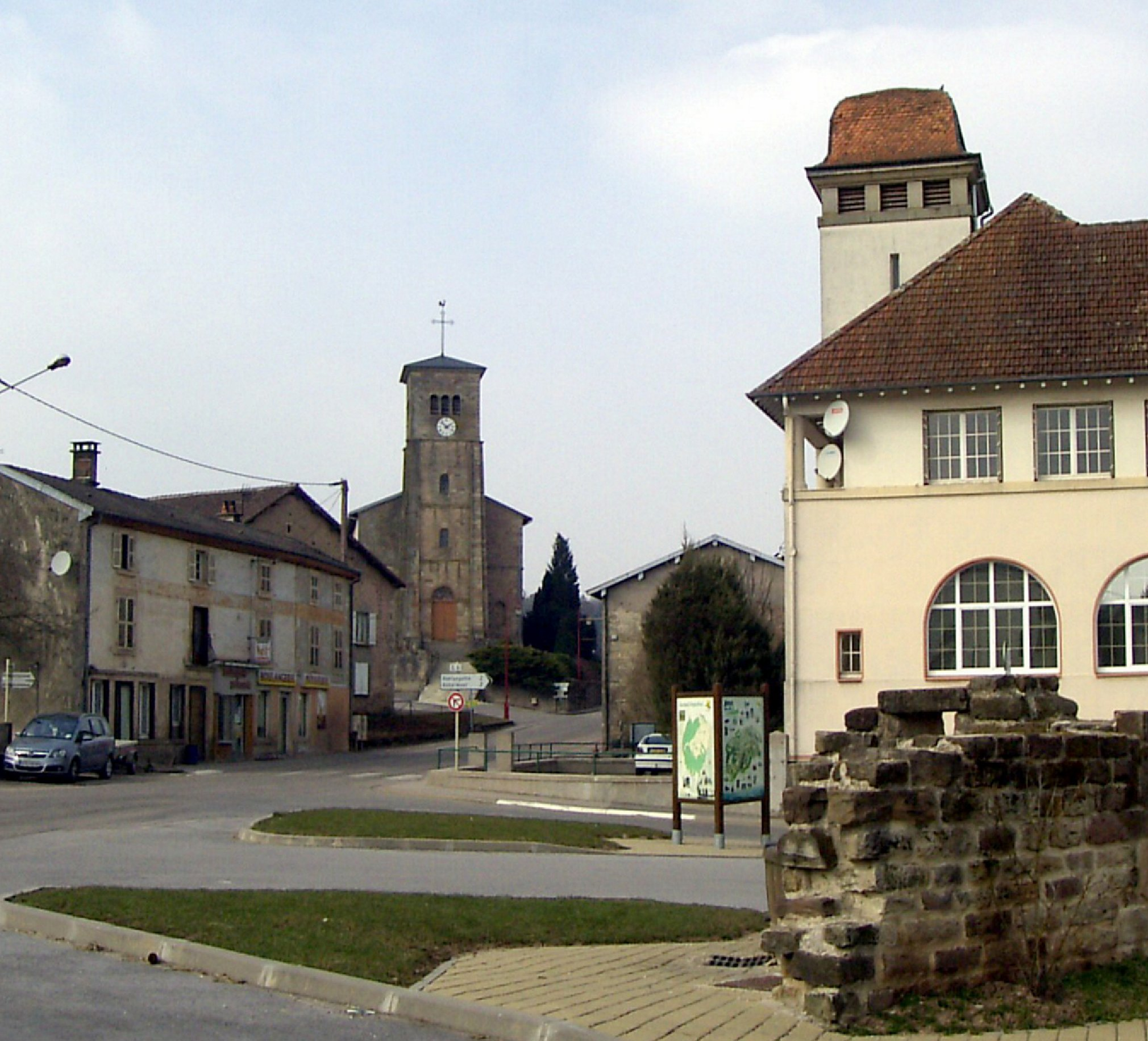
- The centre of the village of Charmois-l'Orgueilleux

- Coat of arms
- Location of Charmois-l'Orgueilleux
- Location within France Location within Grand Est
- Coordinates: 48°06′14″N 6°16′17″E
- Country: France
- Region: Grand Est
- Department: Vosges
- Arrondissement: Épinal
- Canton: Le Val-d'Ajol
- Intercommunality: CA Épinal

Government
  - Mayor (2020–2026): Éric Del Missier
- Area^{1}: 35.92 km^{2} (13.87 sq mi)
- Elevation: 340 m (1,120 ft)
- Highest elevation: 446 m (1,463 ft)
- Lowest elevation: 297 m (974 ft)
- Population (2023): 586
  - Density: 16.3/km^{2} (42.3/sq mi)
- Time zone: UTC+01:00 (CET)
  - Summer (DST): UTC+02:00 (CEST)
- INSEE/Postal code: 88092 /88270
- ^{1} French Land Register data, which excludes lakes, ponds, glaciers > 1 km^{2} (0.386 sq mi or 247 acres) and river estuaries.

Charmois-l'Orgueilleux (French pronunciation: [ʃaʁmwa lɔʁɡœjø]) is a commune in the Vosges department in Grand Est in northeastern France.

== Geography ==
The Côney forms the commune's south-eastern border.

== See also ==
- Communes of the Vosges department
