= Ambiévillers =

- Commune
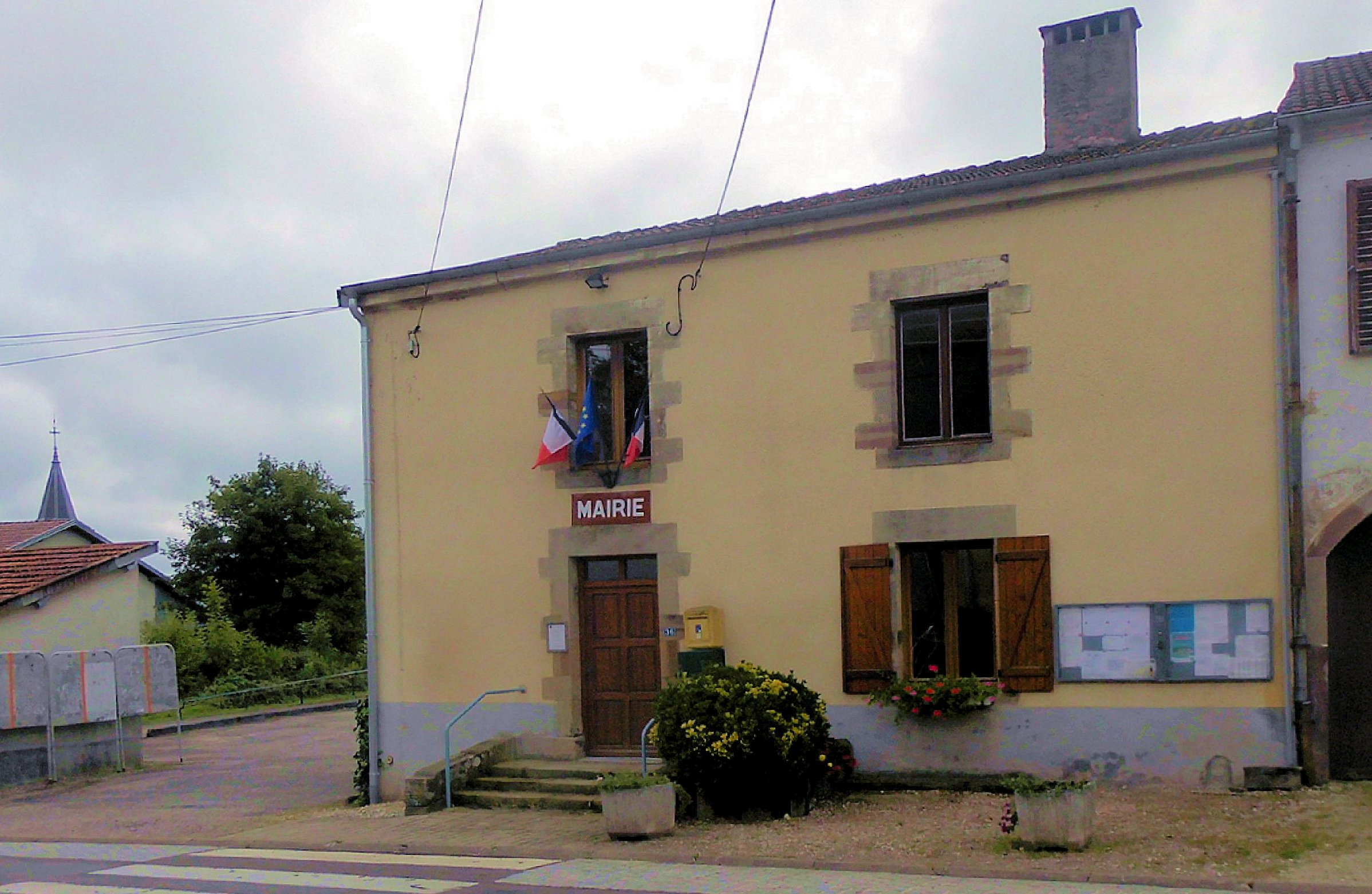
- The town hall in Ambiévillers

- Coat of arms
- Location of Ambiévillers
- Location within France Location within Bourgogne-Franche-Comté
- Coordinates: 47°58′35″N 6°09′37″E
- Country: France
- Region: Bourgogne-Franche-Comté
- Department: Haute-Saône
- Arrondissement: Lure
- Canton: Jussey
- Intercommunality: Haute Comté

Government
  - Mayor (2024–2026): Colette Adam
- Area^{1}: 12.30 km^{2} (4.75 sq mi)
- Highest elevation: 492 m (1,614 ft)
- Lowest elevation: 242 m (794 ft)
- Population (2023): 80
  - Density: 6.5/km^{2} (17/sq mi)
- Time zone: UTC+01:00 (CET)
  - Summer (DST): UTC+02:00 (CEST)
- INSEE/Postal code: 70013 /70210
- ^{1} French Land Register data, which excludes lakes, ponds, glaciers > 1 km^{2} (0.386 sq mi or 247 acres) and river estuaries.

Ambiévillers is a commune in the Haute-Saône department in the region of Bourgogne-Franche-Comté in eastern France.

== Geography ==
The Côney forms most of the commune's southern border.

== See also ==
- Communes of the Haute-Saône department
