= Charmes, Vosges =

Charmes
- Commune
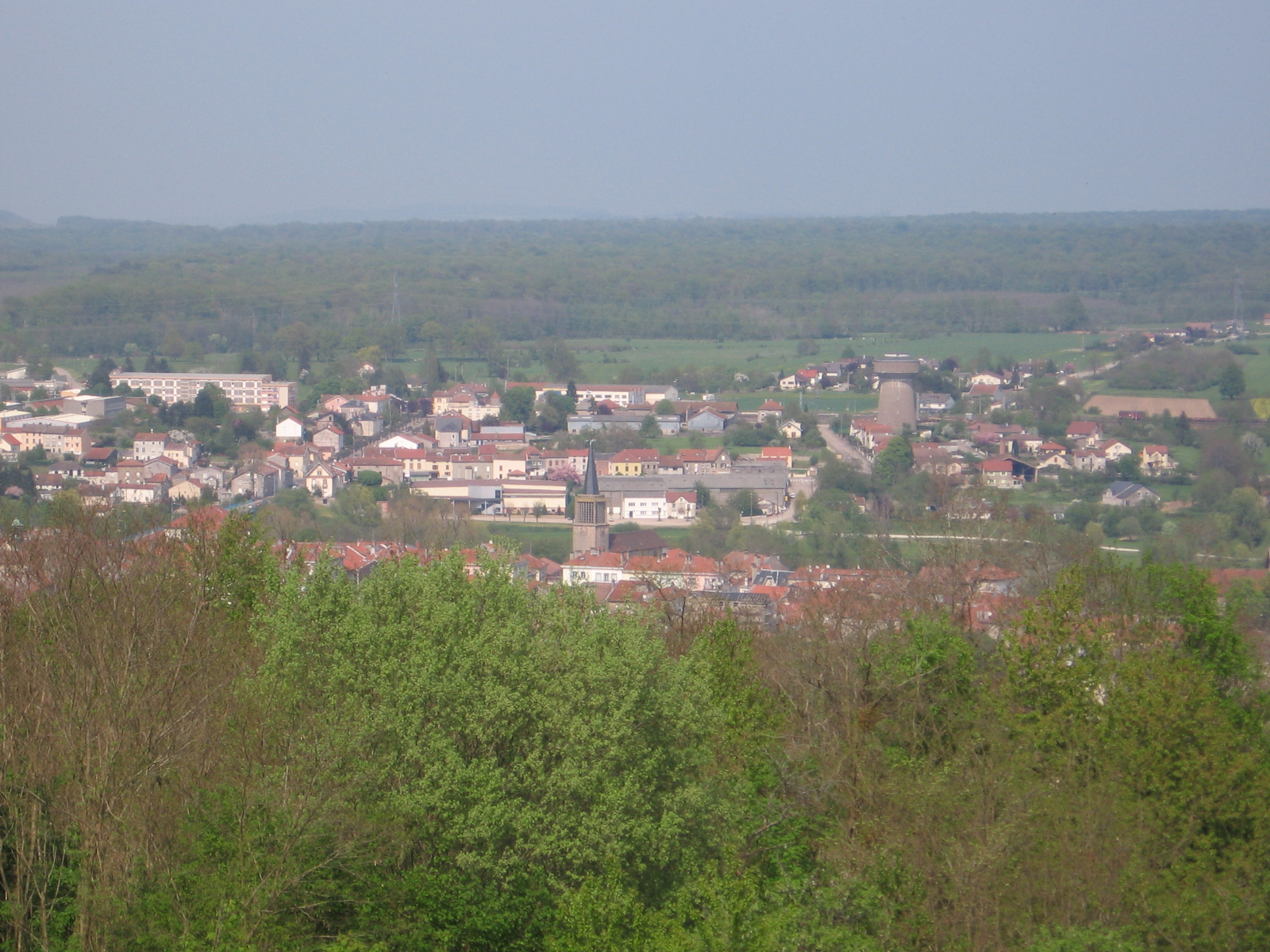
- A general view of Charmes

- Flag Coat of arms
- Location of Charmes
- Location within France Location within Grand Est
- Coordinates: 48°22′21″N 6°17′36″E
- Country: France
- Region: Grand Est
- Department: Vosges
- Arrondissement: Épinal
- Canton: Charmes
- Intercommunality: CA Épinal

Government
  - Mayor (2023–2026): Raphaël Michelet
- Area^{1}: 23.49 km^{2} (9.07 sq mi)
- Highest elevation: 385 m (1,263 ft)
- Lowest elevation: 258 m (846 ft)
- Population (2023): 4,484
  - Density: 190.9/km^{2} (494.4/sq mi)
- Time zone: UTC+01:00 (CET)
  - Summer (DST): UTC+02:00 (CEST)
- INSEE/Postal code: 88090 /88130
- ^{1} French Land Register data, which excludes lakes, ponds, glaciers > 1 km^{2} (0.386 sq mi or 247 acres) and river estuaries.

Charmes (French pronunciation: [ʃaʁm]) is a commune in the Vosges department in Grand Est in northeastern France. It is located on the river Moselle and the Canal de l'Est.

It was extensively destroyed both in the First and Second World Wars. It is a pleasant stop for mobile home owners and canal boats.

== Population ==
Historical population
Year	Pop.	±% p.a.
1968	5,221	—
1975	5,702	+1.27%
1982	5,225	−1.24%
1990	4,721	−1.26%
1999	4,665	−0.13%
2007	4,560	−0.28%
2012	4,653	+0.40%
2017	4,689	+0.15%
2023	4,484	−0.74%
Source: INSEE

== See also ==
- Communes of the Vosges department
- Battle of the Trouée de Charmes
