= Passavant-la-Rochère =

- Commune
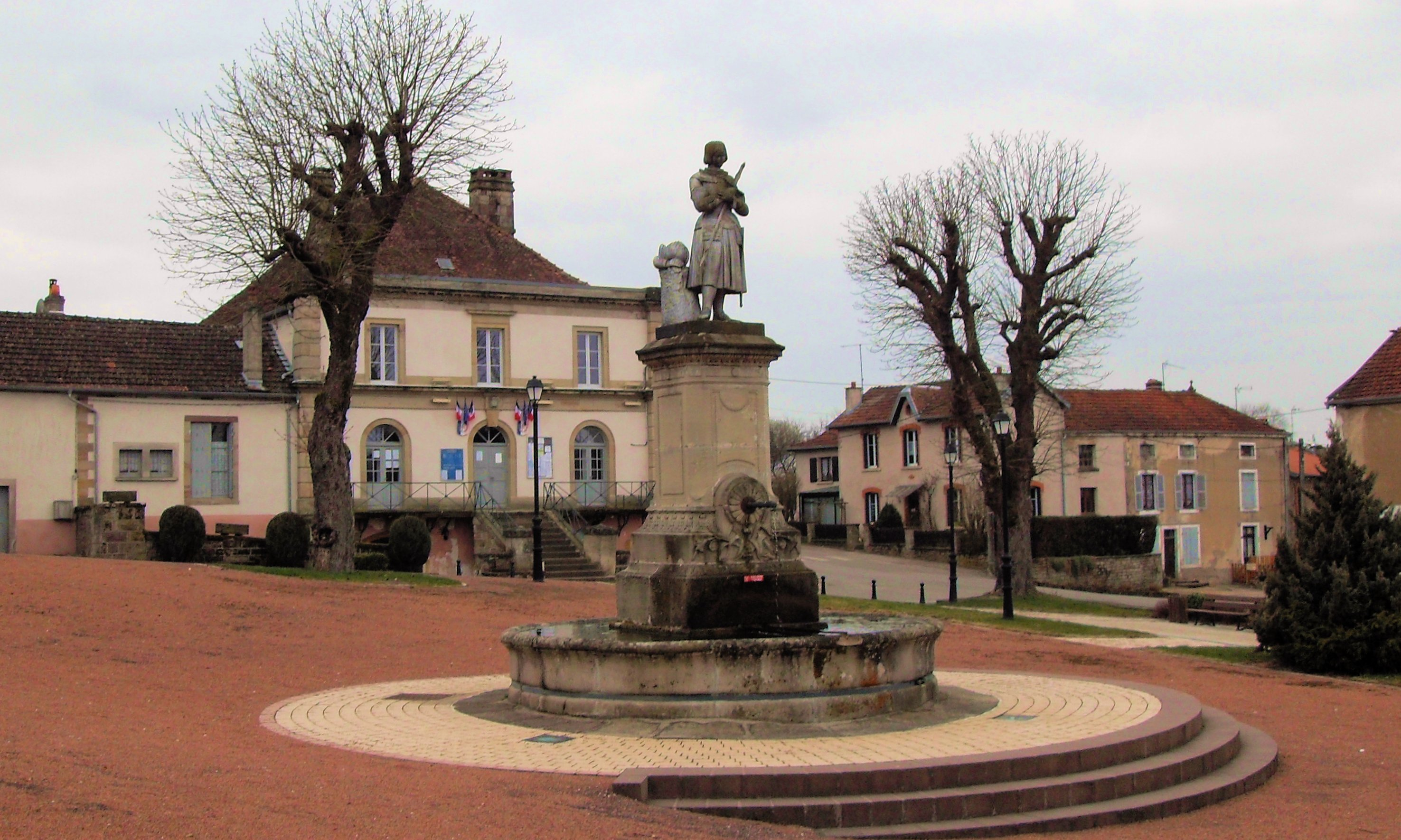
- The square and town hall in Passavant-la-Rochère

- Coat of arms
- Location of Passavant-la-Rochère
- Location within France Location within Bourgogne-Franche-Comté
- Coordinates: 47°58′10″N 6°02′23″E
- Country: France
- Region: Bourgogne-Franche-Comté
- Department: Haute-Saône
- Arrondissement: Vesoul
- Canton: Jussey

Government
  - Mayor (2020–2026): Michel Désiré
- Area^{1}: 29.89 km^{2} (11.54 sq mi)
- Highest elevation: 452 m (1,483 ft)
- Lowest elevation: 227 m (745 ft)
- Population (2023): 524
  - Density: 17.5/km^{2} (45.4/sq mi)
- Time zone: UTC+01:00 (CET)
  - Summer (DST): UTC+02:00 (CEST)
- INSEE/Postal code: 70404 /70210
- ^{1} French Land Register data, which excludes lakes, ponds, glaciers > 1 km^{2} (0.386 sq mi or 247 acres) and river estuaries.

Passavant-la-Rochère (French pronunciation: [pasavɑ̃ la ʁɔʃɛʁ]) is a commune in the Haute-Saône department in the region of Bourgogne-Franche-Comté in eastern France.

== Geography ==
The Côney forms the eastern part of the commune's southern border.

== See also ==
- Communes of the Haute-Saône department
