= Uriménil =

- Commune
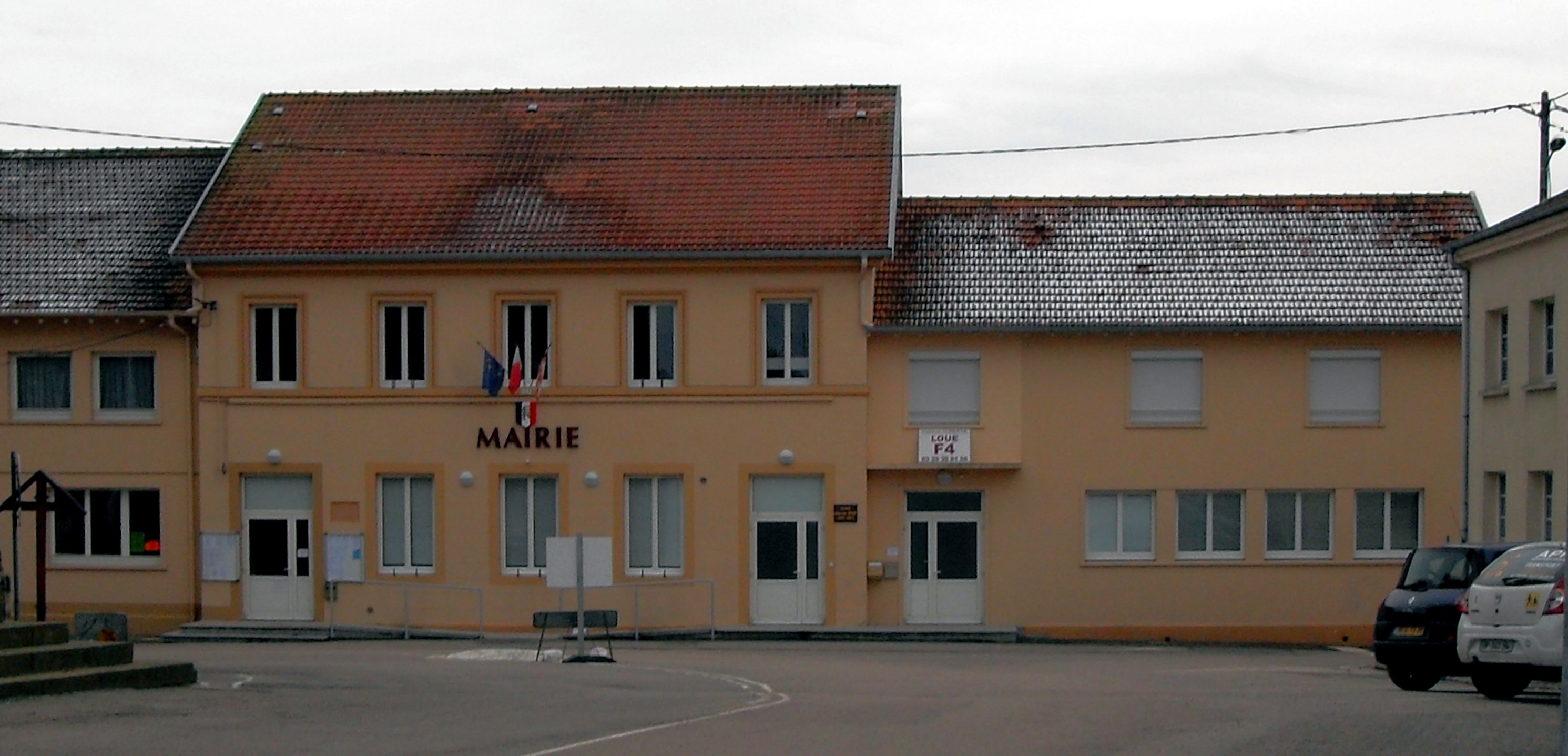
- The town hall in Uriménil
- Location of Uriménil
- Location within France Location within Grand Est
- Coordinates: 48°06′07″N 6°24′08″E
- Country: France
- Region: Grand Est
- Department: Vosges
- Arrondissement: Épinal
- Canton: Le Val-d'Ajol
- Intercommunality: CA Épinal

Government
  - Mayor (2020–2026): Éric Garion
- Area^{1}: 15.62 km^{2} (6.03 sq mi)
- Elevation: 350 m (1,150 ft)
- Highest elevation: 465 m (1,526 ft)
- Lowest elevation: 338 m (1,109 ft)
- Population (2023): 1,323
  - Density: 84.70/km^{2} (219.4/sq mi)
- Time zone: UTC+01:00 (CET)
  - Summer (DST): UTC+02:00 (CEST)
- INSEE/Postal code: 88481 /88220
- ^{1} French Land Register data, which excludes lakes, ponds, glaciers > 1 km^{2} (0.386 sq mi or 247 acres) and river estuaries.

Uriménil (French pronunciation: [yʁimenil]) is a commune in the Vosges department in Grand Est in northeastern France.

== Geography ==
The Côney flows southwest through the middle of the commune, crosses the village, and forms part of the commune's southwestern border.

== See also ==
- Communes of the Vosges department
