= Canton of Épinal-1 =

Canton of France

Coordinates: 48.18°N 6.44°E

The canton of Épinal-1 is an administrative division of the Vosges department, in northeastern France. It was created at the French canton reorganisation which came into effect in March 2015. Its seat is in Épinal.

It consists of the following communes:

1. Arches
2. Chantraine
3. Chaumousey
4. Dinozé
5. Épinal (partly)
6. Les Forges
7. Renauvoid
8. Sanchey
