= Mailleroncourt-Saint-Pancras =

- Commune
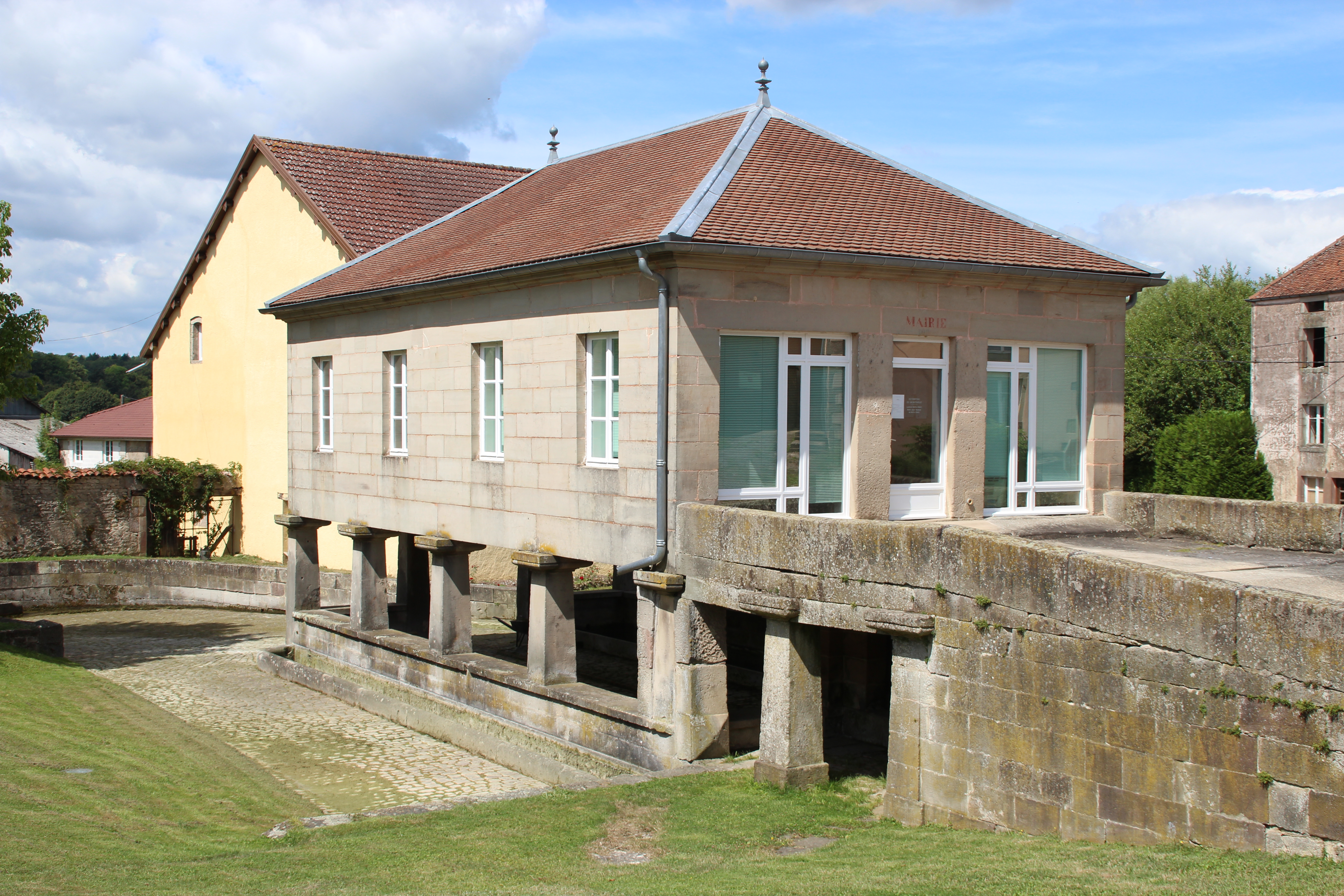
- The town hall and wash house in Mailleroncourt-Saint-Pancras
- Location of Mailleroncourt-Saint-Pancras
- Location within France Location within Bourgogne-Franche-Comté
- Coordinates: 47°55′07″N 6°07′58″E
- Country: France
- Region: Bourgogne-Franche-Comté
- Department: Haute-Saône
- Arrondissement: Lure
- Canton: Port-sur-Saône
- Area^{1}: 14.90 km^{2} (5.75 sq mi)
- Highest elevation: 331 m (1,086 ft)
- Lowest elevation: 237 m (778 ft)
- Population (2023): 174
  - Density: 11.7/km^{2} (30.2/sq mi)
- Time zone: UTC+01:00 (CET)
  - Summer (DST): UTC+02:00 (CEST)
- INSEE/Postal code: 70323 /70210
- ^{1} French Land Register data, which excludes lakes, ponds, glaciers > 1 km^{2} (0.386 sq mi or 247 acres) and river estuaries.

Mailleroncourt-Saint-Pancras is a commune in the Haute-Saône department in the region of Bourgogne-Franche-Comté in eastern France.

== Geography ==
The Côney forms most of the commune's northern border.

== See also ==
- Communes of the Haute-Saône department
