= Sanchey =

- Commune
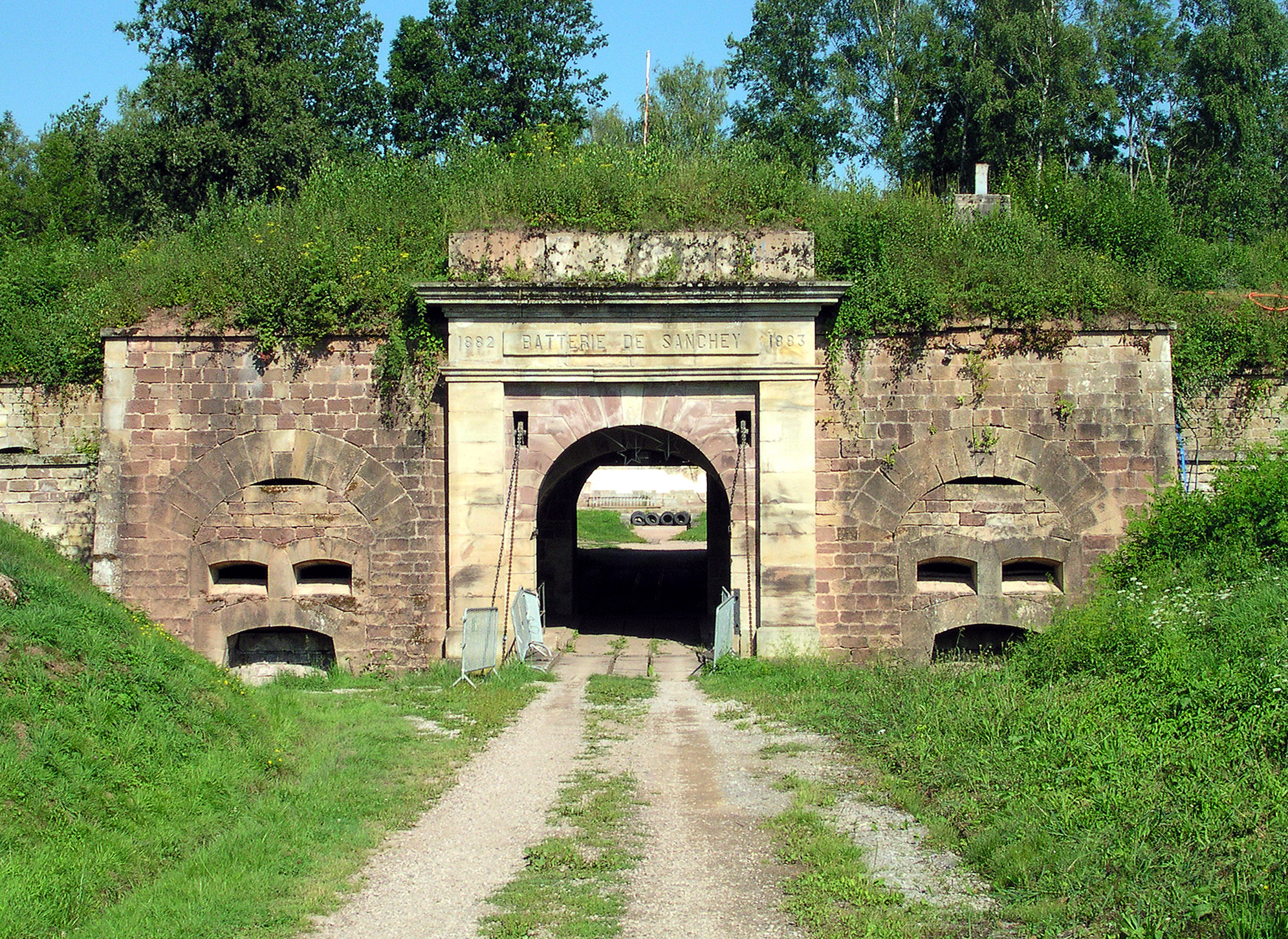
- Sanchey Fort
- Location of Sanchey
- Location within France Location within Grand Est
- Coordinates: 48°10′24″N 6°21′50″E
- Country: France
- Region: Grand Est
- Department: Vosges
- Arrondissement: Épinal
- Canton: Épinal-1
- Intercommunality: CA Épinal

Government
  - Mayor (2020–2026): Gilles Dubois
- Area^{1}: 5.51 km^{2} (2.13 sq mi)
- Elevation: 360 m (1,180 ft)
- Highest elevation: 456 m (1,496 ft)
- Lowest elevation: 341 m (1,119 ft)
- Population (2023): 963
  - Density: 175/km^{2} (453/sq mi)
- Time zone: UTC+01:00 (CET)
  - Summer (DST): UTC+02:00 (CEST)
- INSEE/Postal code: 88439 /88390
- ^{1} French Land Register data, which excludes lakes, ponds, glaciers > 1 km^{2} (0.386 sq mi or 247 acres) and river estuaries.

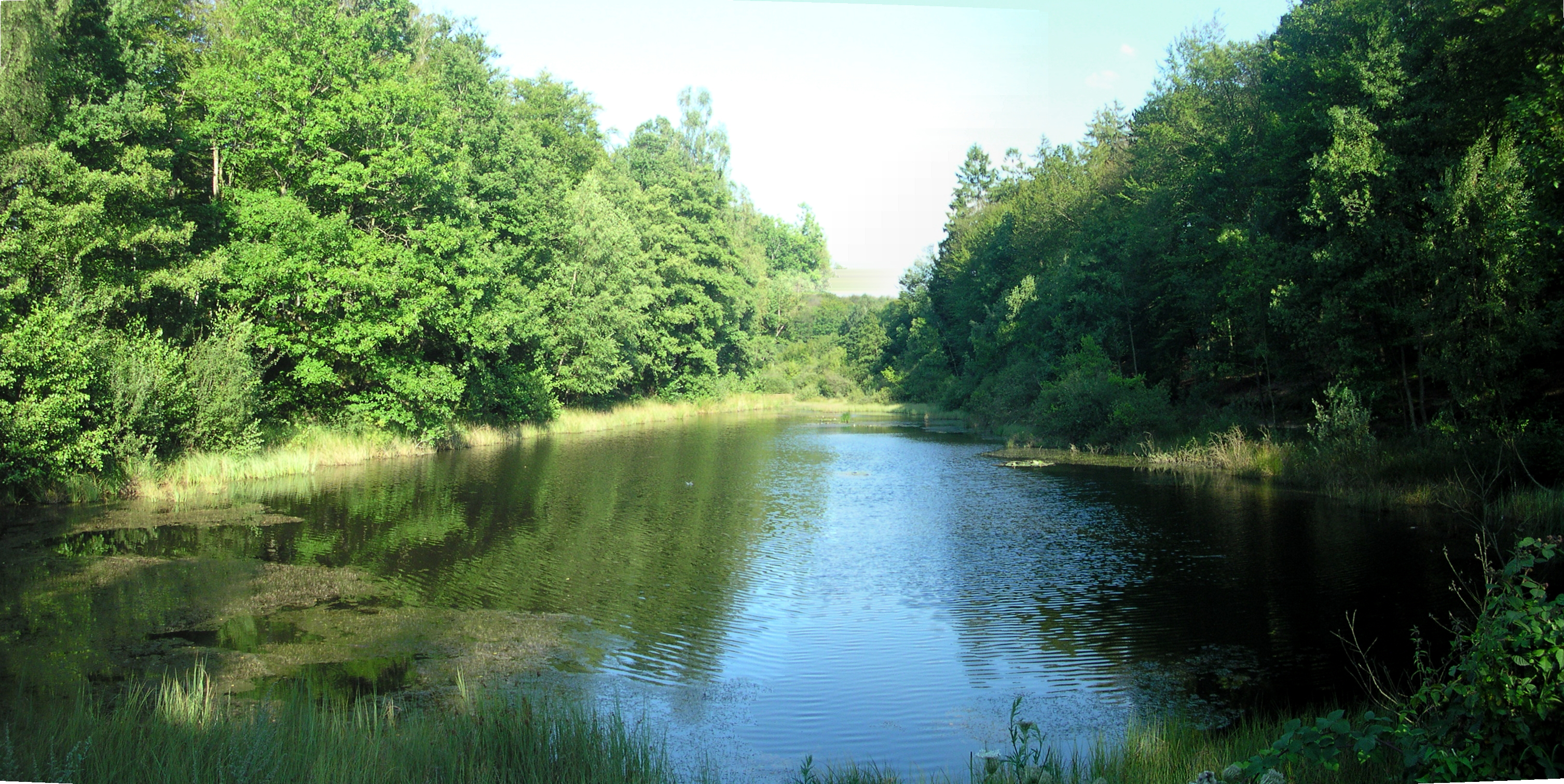
The Comtesse pond in the forest near Sanchey

Sanchey (French pronunciation: [sɑ̃ʃɛ]) is a commune in the Vosges department in Grand Est in northeastern France.

The territory of the community of Sanchey is 551 hectares. It is located 8 km south of Épinal.

== See also ==
- Communes of the Vosges department
