= Renauvoid =

- Commune
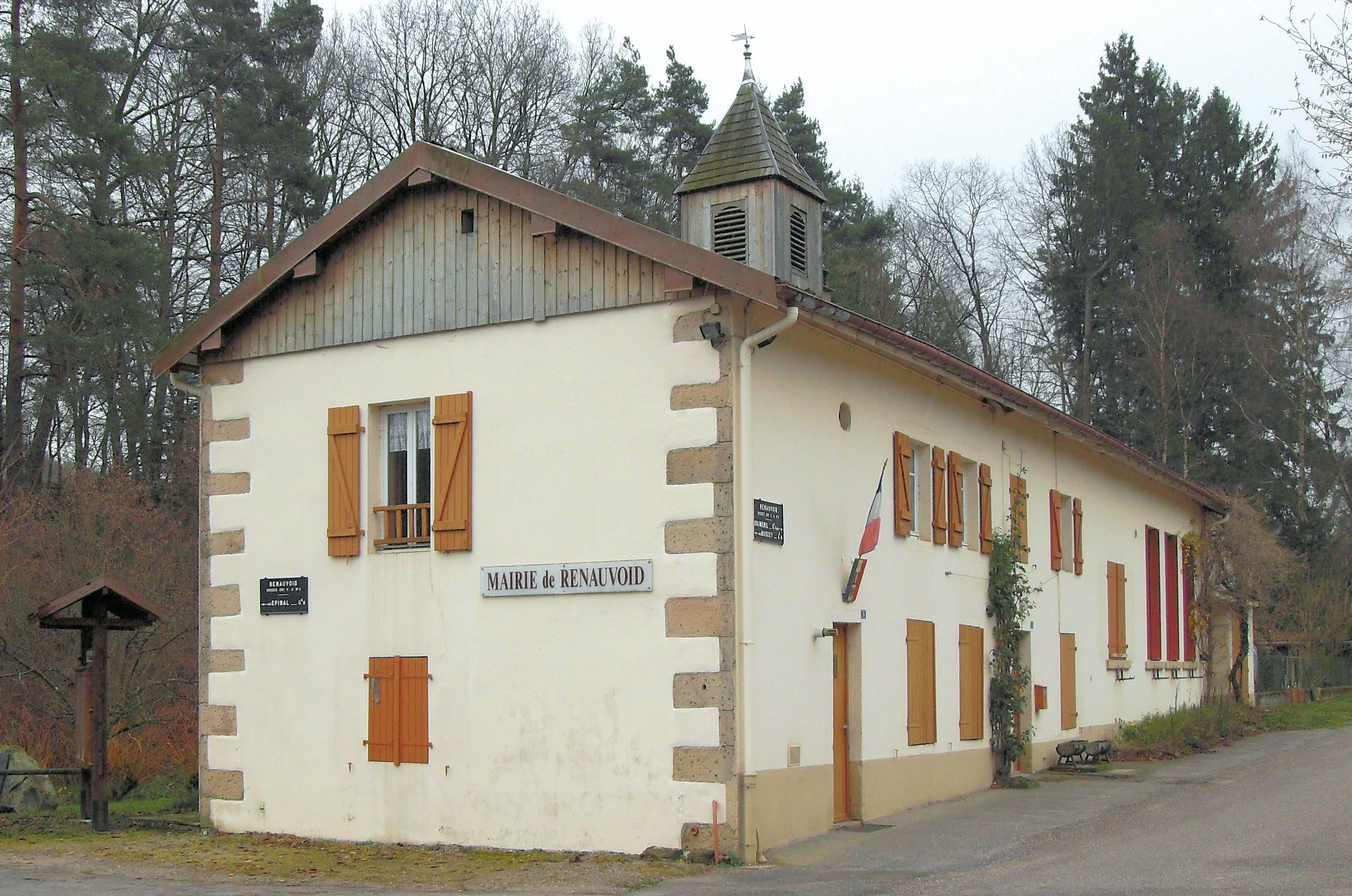
- The town hall in Renauvoid
- Location of Renauvoid
- Location within France Location within Grand Est
- Coordinates: 48°08′40″N 6°23′03″E
- Country: France
- Region: Grand Est
- Department: Vosges
- Arrondissement: Épinal
- Canton: Épinal-1
- Intercommunality: CA Épinal

Government
  - Mayor (2020–2026): Yvan Bombarde
- Area^{1}: 9.36 km^{2} (3.61 sq mi)
- Elevation: 400 m (1,300 ft)
- Highest elevation: 478 m (1,568 ft)
- Lowest elevation: 369 m (1,211 ft)
- Population (2023): 118
  - Density: 12.6/km^{2} (32.7/sq mi)
- Time zone: UTC+01:00 (CET)
  - Summer (DST): UTC+02:00 (CEST)
- INSEE/Postal code: 88388 /88390
- ^{1} French Land Register data, which excludes lakes, ponds, glaciers > 1 km^{2} (0.386 sq mi or 247 acres) and river estuaries.

Renauvoid (French pronunciation: [ʁənovwa]) is a commune in the Vosges department in Grand Est in northeastern France.

== See also ==
- Communes of the Vosges department
