= Pont-du-Bois =

- Commune
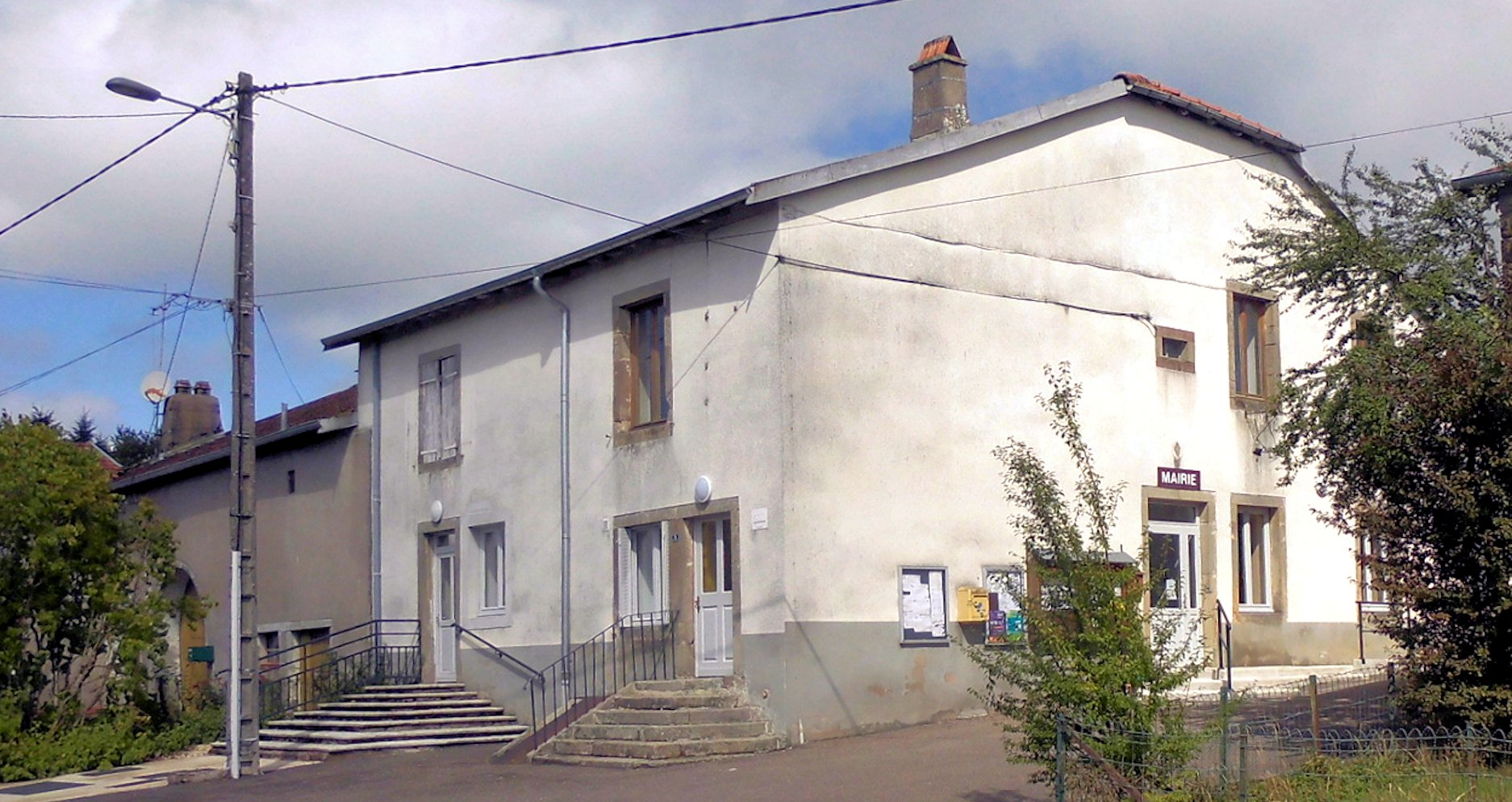
- The town hall in Pont-du-Bois
- Location of Pont-du-Bois
- Location within France Location within Bourgogne-Franche-Comté
- Coordinates: 47°58′10″N 6°07′35″E
- Country: France
- Region: Bourgogne-Franche-Comté
- Department: Haute-Saône
- Arrondissement: Lure
- Canton: Jussey

Government
  - Mayor (2020–2026): Pascal Bigé
- Area^{1}: 8.15 km^{2} (3.15 sq mi)
- Highest elevation: 482 m (1,581 ft)
- Lowest elevation: 237 m (778 ft)
- Population (2023): 115
  - Density: 14.1/km^{2} (36.5/sq mi)
- Time zone: UTC+01:00 (CET)
  - Summer (DST): UTC+02:00 (CEST)
- INSEE/Postal code: 70419 /70210
- ^{1} French Land Register data, which excludes lakes, ponds, glaciers > 1 km^{2} (0.386 sq mi or 247 acres) and river estuaries.

Pont-du-Bois (French pronunciation: [pɔ̃ dy bwa]) is a commune in the Haute-Saône department in the region of Bourgogne-Franche-Comté in eastern France.

== Geography ==
The Côney forms the commune's southern border.

== See also ==
- Communes of the Haute-Saône department
