= Dounoux =

- Commune
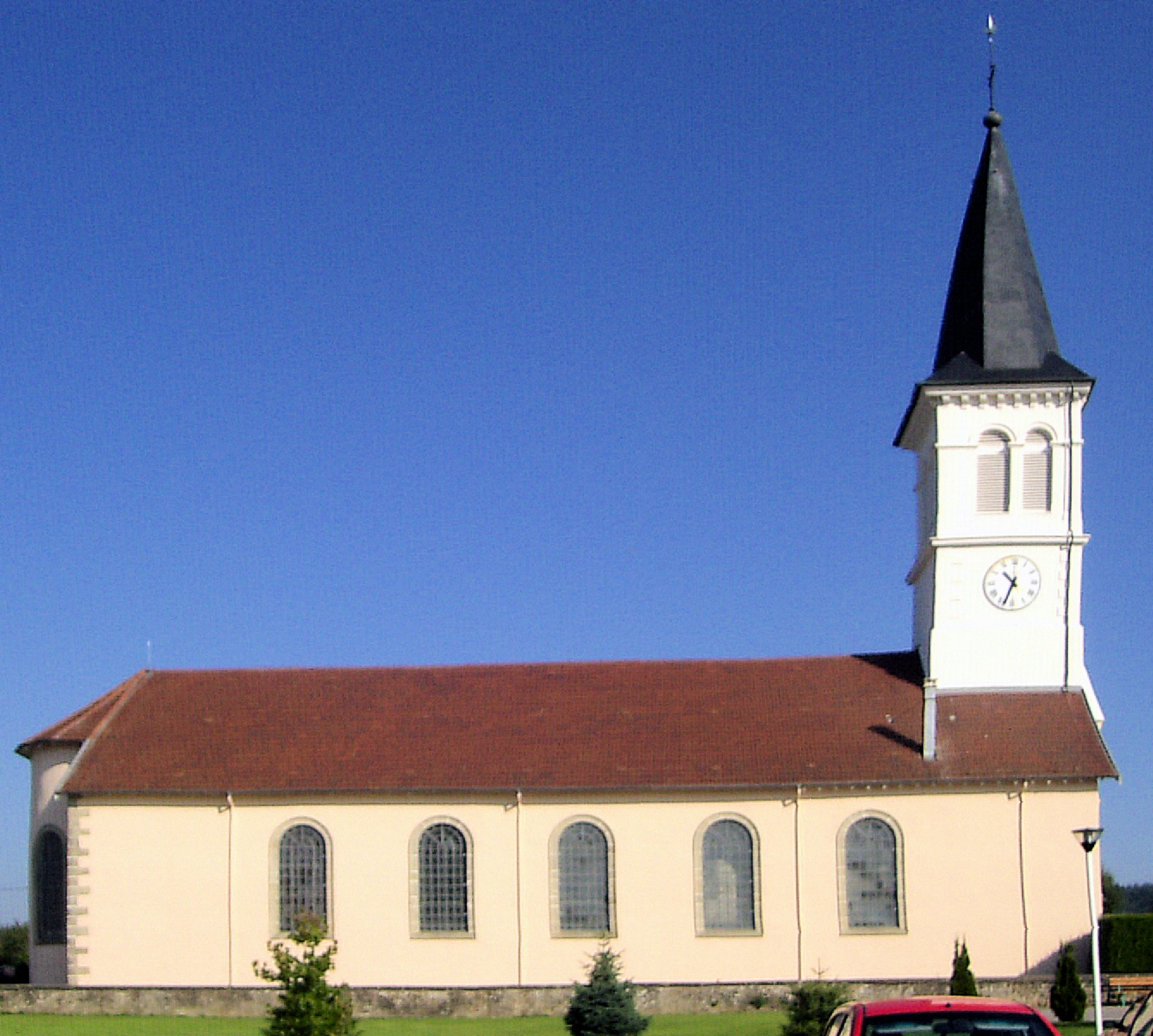
- Church of Saint-Médard

- Coat of arms
- Location of Dounoux
- Location within France Location within Grand Est
- Coordinates: 48°06′19″N 6°26′41″E
- Country: France
- Region: Grand Est
- Department: Vosges
- Arrondissement: Épinal
- Canton: Le Val-d'Ajol
- Intercommunality: CA Épinal

Government
  - Mayor (2020–2026): Gilles Nexon
- Area^{1}: 9.23 km^{2} (3.56 sq mi)
- Elevation: 416 m (1,365 ft)
- Highest elevation: 520 m (1,710 ft)
- Lowest elevation: 360 m (1,180 ft)
- Population (2023): 880
  - Density: 95/km^{2} (250/sq mi)
- Time zone: UTC+01:00 (CET)
  - Summer (DST): UTC+02:00 (CEST)
- INSEE/Postal code: 88157 /88220
- ^{1} French Land Register data, which excludes lakes, ponds, glaciers > 1 km^{2} (0.386 sq mi or 247 acres) and river estuaries.

Dounoux (French pronunciation: [dunu]) is a commune in the Vosges department in Grand Est in northeastern France.

== Geography ==
The Côney has its source in the commune, near a place called Lion Faing.

== See also ==
- Communes of the Vosges department
