= La Basse-Vaivre =

- Commune
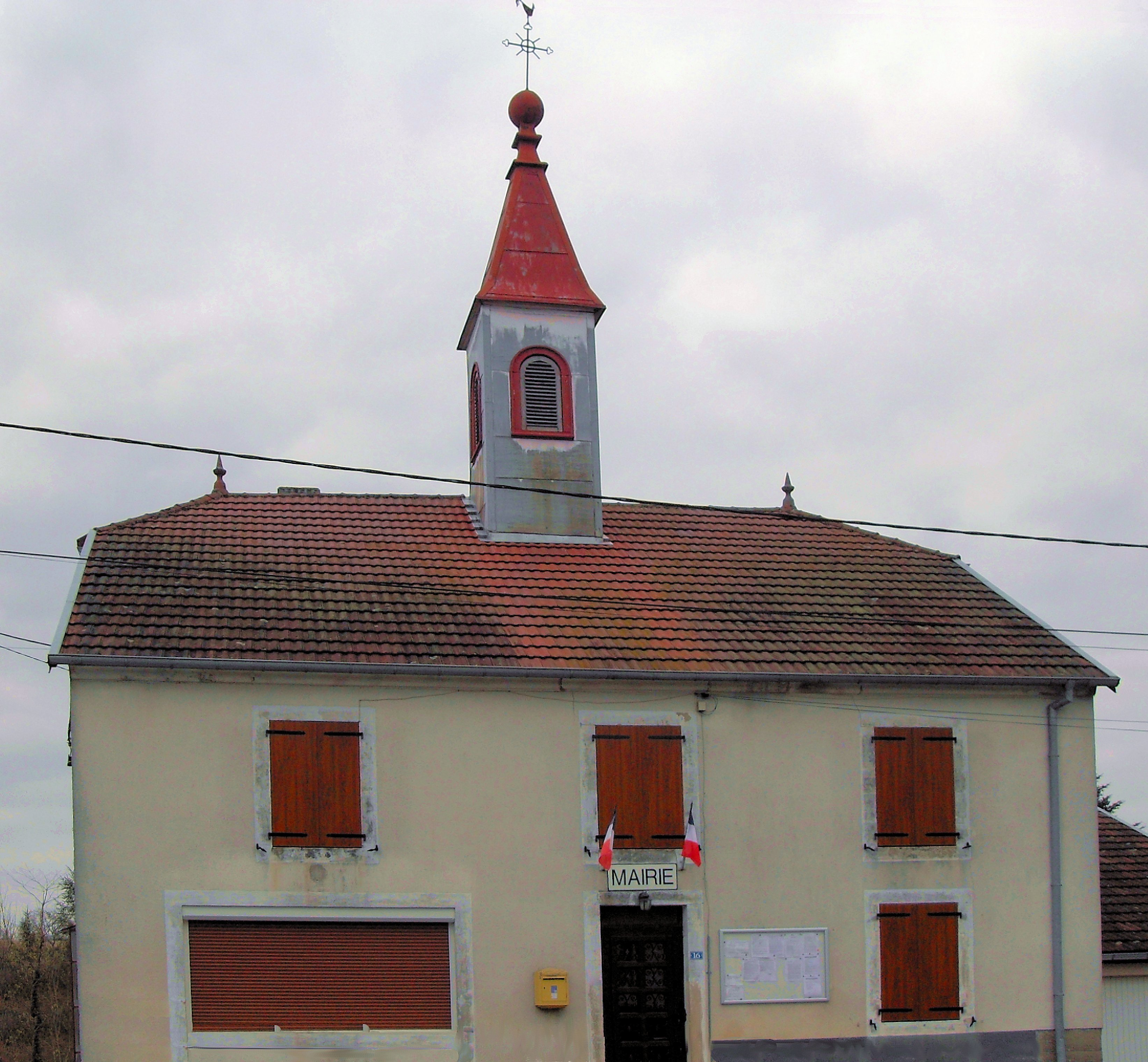
- The town hall in La Basse-Vaivre

- Coat of arms
- Location of La Basse-Vaivre
- Location within France Location within Bourgogne-Franche-Comté
- Coordinates: 47°57′03″N 6°03′24″E
- Country: France
- Region: Bourgogne-Franche-Comté
- Department: Haute-Saône
- Arrondissement: Vesoul
- Canton: Jussey

Government
  - Mayor (2022–2026): Patrick Bôle-Richard
- Area^{1}: 3.54 km^{2} (1.37 sq mi)
- Highest elevation: 268 m (879 ft)
- Lowest elevation: 227 m (745 ft)
- Population (2023): 49
  - Density: 14/km^{2} (36/sq mi)
- Time zone: UTC+01:00 (CET)
  - Summer (DST): UTC+02:00 (CEST)
- INSEE/Postal code: 70051 /70210
- ^{1} French Land Register data, which excludes lakes, ponds, glaciers > 1 km^{2} (0.386 sq mi or 247 acres) and river estuaries.

La Basse-Vaivre is a commune in the Haute-Saône department in the region of Bourgogne-Franche-Comté in eastern France.

== Geography ==
The Côney forms the commune's northern and north-western borders.

== See also ==
- Communes of the Haute-Saône department
