= Alaincourt, Aisne =

Alaincourt
- Commune
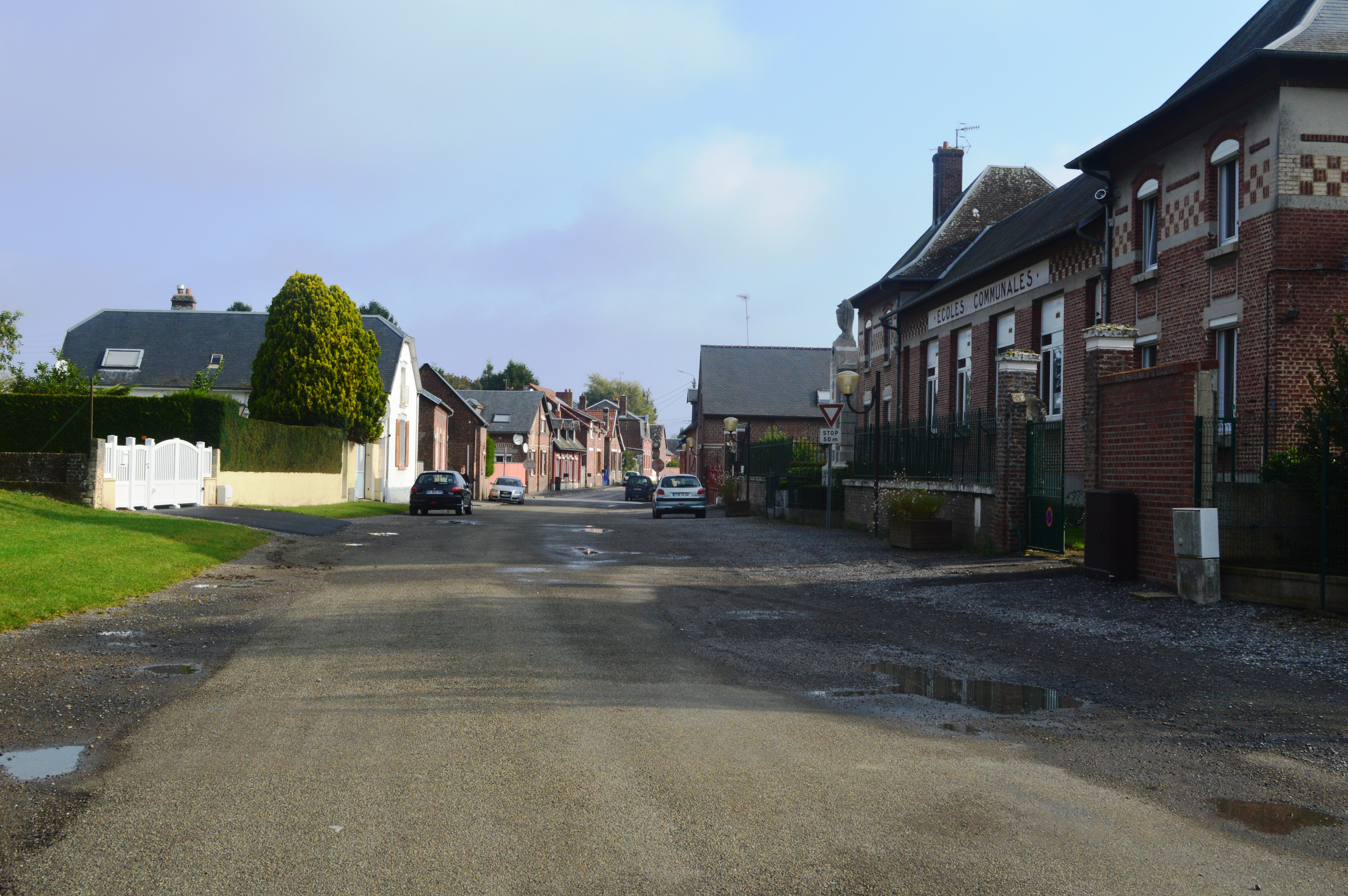
- Location of Alaincourt
- Location within France Location within Hauts-de-France
- Coordinates: 49°45′55″N 3°22′35″E
- Country: France
- Region: Hauts-de-France
- Department: Aisne
- Arrondissement: Saint-Quentin
- Canton: Ribemont
- Intercommunality: Val de l'Oise

Government
  - Mayor (2026–32): Renaud Bourdaud'hui
- Area^{1}: 5.9 km^{2} (2.3 sq mi)
- Elevation: 68 m (223 ft)
- Highest elevation: 109 m (358 ft)
- Lowest elevation: 57 m (187 ft)
- Population (2023): 517
  - Density: 88/km^{2} (230/sq mi)
- Time zone: UTC+01:00 (CET)
  - Summer (DST): UTC+02:00 (CEST)
- INSEE/Postal code: 02009 /02240
- ^{1} French Land Register data, which excludes lakes, ponds, glaciers > 1 km^{2} (0.386 sq mi or 247 acres) and river estuaries.

Alaincourt (French pronunciation: [alɛ̃kuʁ]) is a commune in the department of Aisne in the Hauts-de-France region of northern France.

== Geography ==
Alaincourt is located some 10 km south-east of Saint-Quentin and some 25 km north-west of Laon. The Motorway from Saint-Quentin – the E17 (A26) – passes directly through the commune heading south-east towards Reims – some 120 km to the south-east. The motorway has no exit in the commune so it must be reached by the road D34 coming north-east from Moy-de-l'Aisne and continuing north-east to Berthenicourt. Apart from small country roads no other roads enter the commune. Alaincourt is the only village in the commune.

Apart from Alaincourt itself, which is quite large, the commune is entirely farmland. East of the village the commune is traversed by the Oise river and the Canal de la Sambre a l'Oise both waterways heading south more-or-less parallel to each other (the canal in a straight line) until the Oise joins the Aisne at Clairoix and continues as the Oise until it joins the Seine at Conflans-Sainte-Honorine in the north-west of Paris. There are a number of ponds and reservoirs near the Oise in the south-east of the commune. Apart from the Oise and a small stream also called the Oise there are no other watercourses in the commune.

== Demographics ==
Historical population
Year	Pop.	±% p.a.
1968	434	—
1975	425	−0.30%
1982	504	+2.47%
1990	521	+0.42%
1999	465	−1.26%
2007	491	+0.68%
2012	520	+1.15%
2017	543	+0.87%
2023	517	−0.81%
Source: INSEE

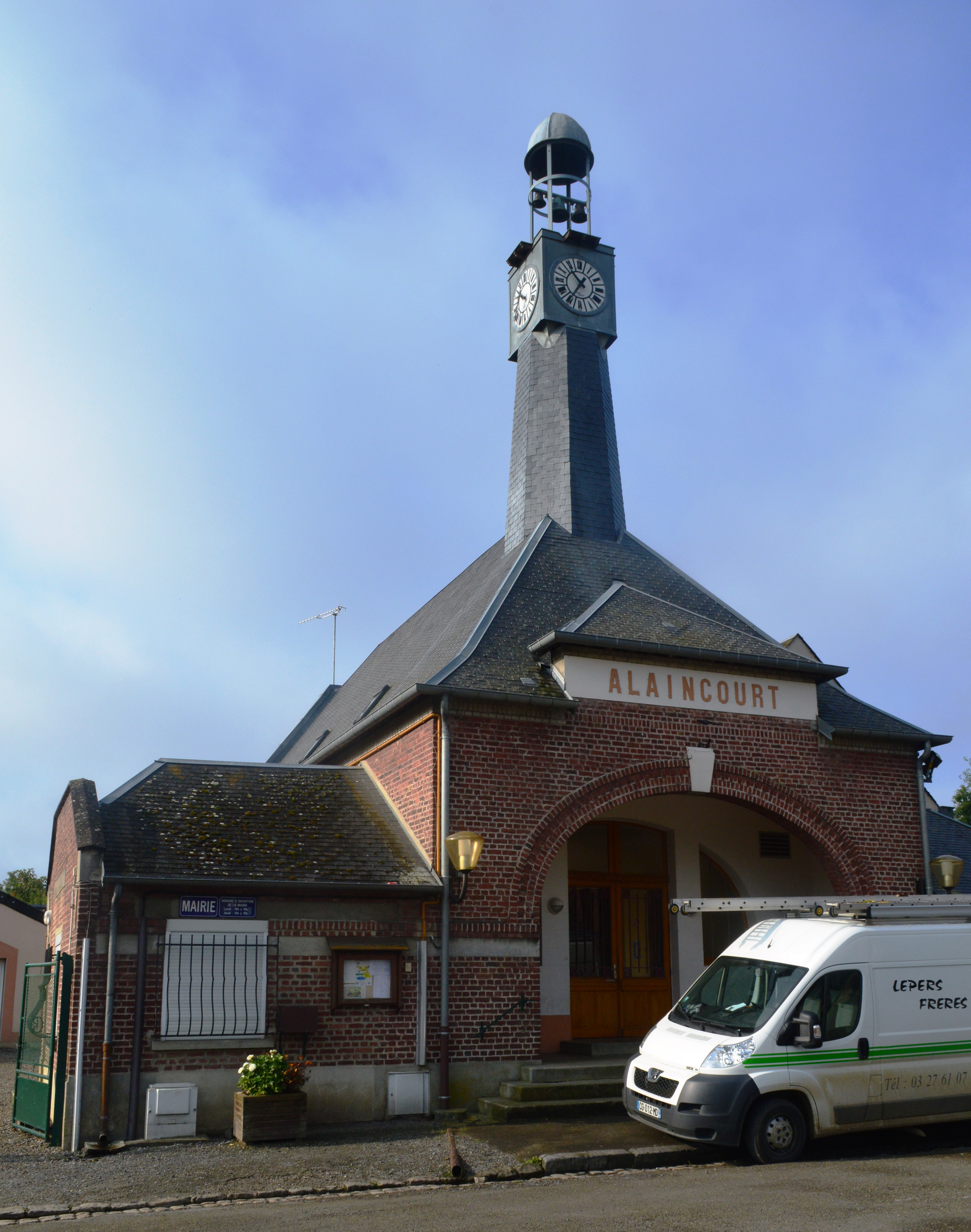
The Town Hall

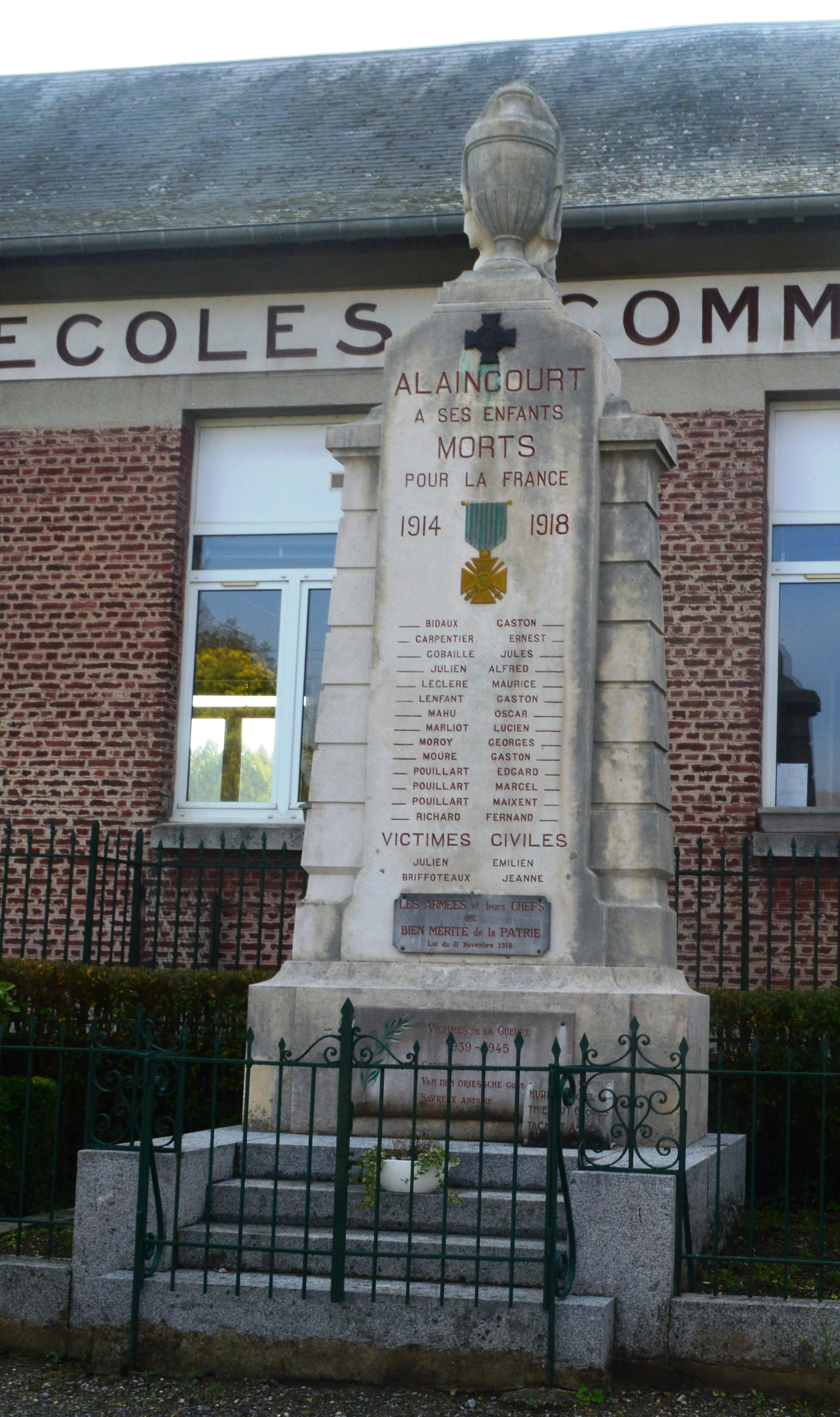
Alaincourt War Memorial

== Sites and monuments ==
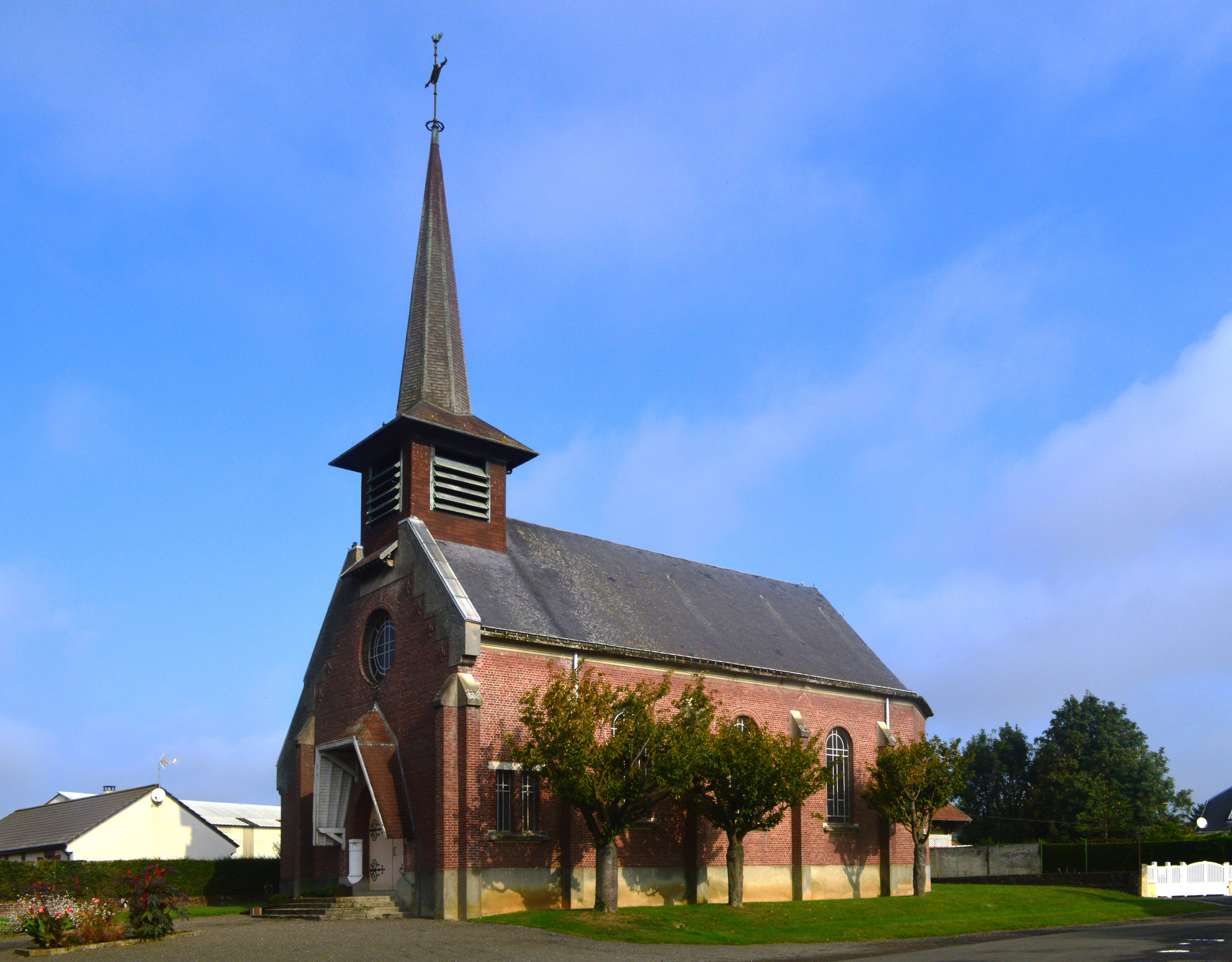
Alaincourt Church

- The House of Marie-Jeanne, a collection of everyday objects
- Multi-media Library

== Notable people linked to the commune ==
- Robert Louis Stevenson during his journey along the Oise.

== See also ==
- Communes of the Aisne department
