= Corre =

- Commune
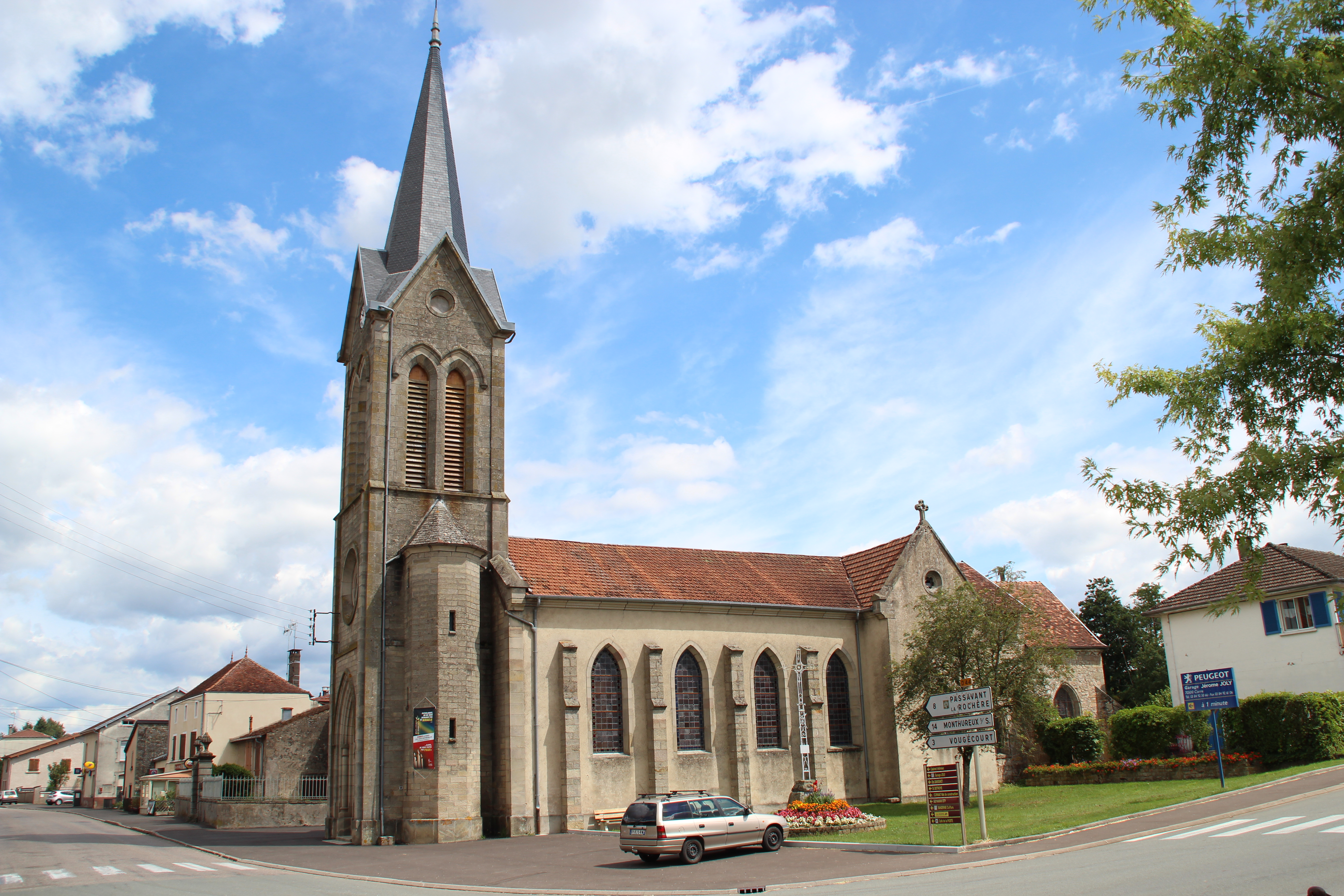
- Church

- Coat of arms
- Location of Corre
- Location within France Location within Bourgogne-Franche-Comté
- Coordinates: 47°55′09″N 5°59′40″E
- Country: France
- Region: Bourgogne-Franche-Comté
- Department: Haute-Saône
- Arrondissement: Vesoul
- Canton: Jussey

Government
  - Mayor (2020–2026): Christine Litzler
- Area^{1}: 9.13 km^{2} (3.53 sq mi)
- Highest elevation: 303 m (994 ft)
- Lowest elevation: 219 m (719 ft)
- Population (2023): 596
  - Density: 65.3/km^{2} (169/sq mi)
- Time zone: UTC+01:00 (CET)
  - Summer (DST): UTC+02:00 (CEST)
- INSEE/Postal code: 70177 /70500
- ^{1} French Land Register data, which excludes lakes, ponds, glaciers > 1 km^{2} (0.386 sq mi or 247 acres) and river estuaries.

Corre (French pronunciation: [kɔʁ]) is a commune in the Haute-Saône department in the region of Bourgogne-Franche-Comté in eastern France.

== Geography ==
The Côney flows southward through the middle of the commune, crosses the village, then flows into the Saône, which forms most of the commune's south-western border.

== See also ==
- Communes of the Haute-Saône department
