= Alaincourt, Haute-Saône =

Commune in eastern France

Alaincourt
- Commune
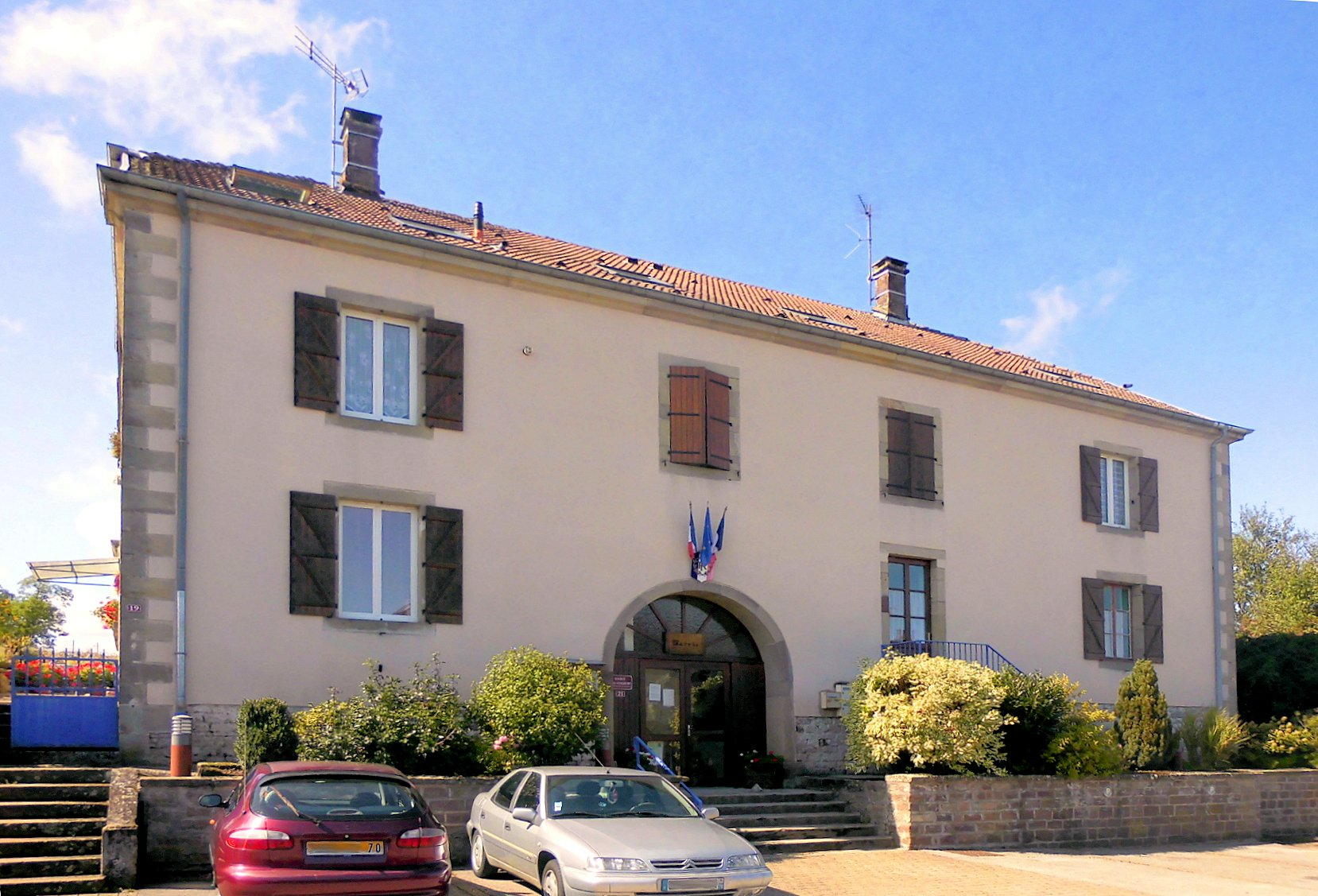
- The town hall in Alaincourt

- Coat of arms
- Location of Alaincourt
- Location within France Location within Bourgogne-Franche-Comté
- Coordinates: 47°56′34″N 6°06′08″E
- Country: France
- Region: Bourgogne-Franche-Comté
- Department: Haute-Saône
- Arrondissement: Lure
- Canton: Jussey
- Intercommunality: Haute Comté

Government
  - Mayor (2020–2026): Antonin Simoes
- Area^{1}: 5.83 km^{2} (2.25 sq mi)
- Highest elevation: 285 m (935 ft)
- Lowest elevation: 235 m (771 ft)
- Population (2023): 97
  - Density: 17/km^{2} (43/sq mi)
- Time zone: UTC+01:00 (CET)
  - Summer (DST): UTC+02:00 (CEST)
- INSEE/Postal code: 70010 /70210
- ^{1} French Land Register data, which excludes lakes, ponds, glaciers > 1 km^{2} (0.386 sq mi or 247 acres) and river estuaries.

Alaincourt (French pronunciation: [alɛ̃kuʁ]) is a commune in the Haute-Saône department in the region of Bourgogne-Franche-Comté in eastern France.

== Geography ==
The Côney forms part of the commune's northern border.

== Population ==
Historical population
Year	Pop.	±% p.a.
1968	92	—
1975	82	−1.63%
1982	72	−1.84%
1990	85	+2.10%
1999	89	+0.51%
2007	96	+0.95%
2012	100	+0.82%
2017	112	+2.29%
2023	97	−2.37%
Source: INSEE

== See also ==
- Communes of the Haute-Saône department
