= Troussey =

- Commune
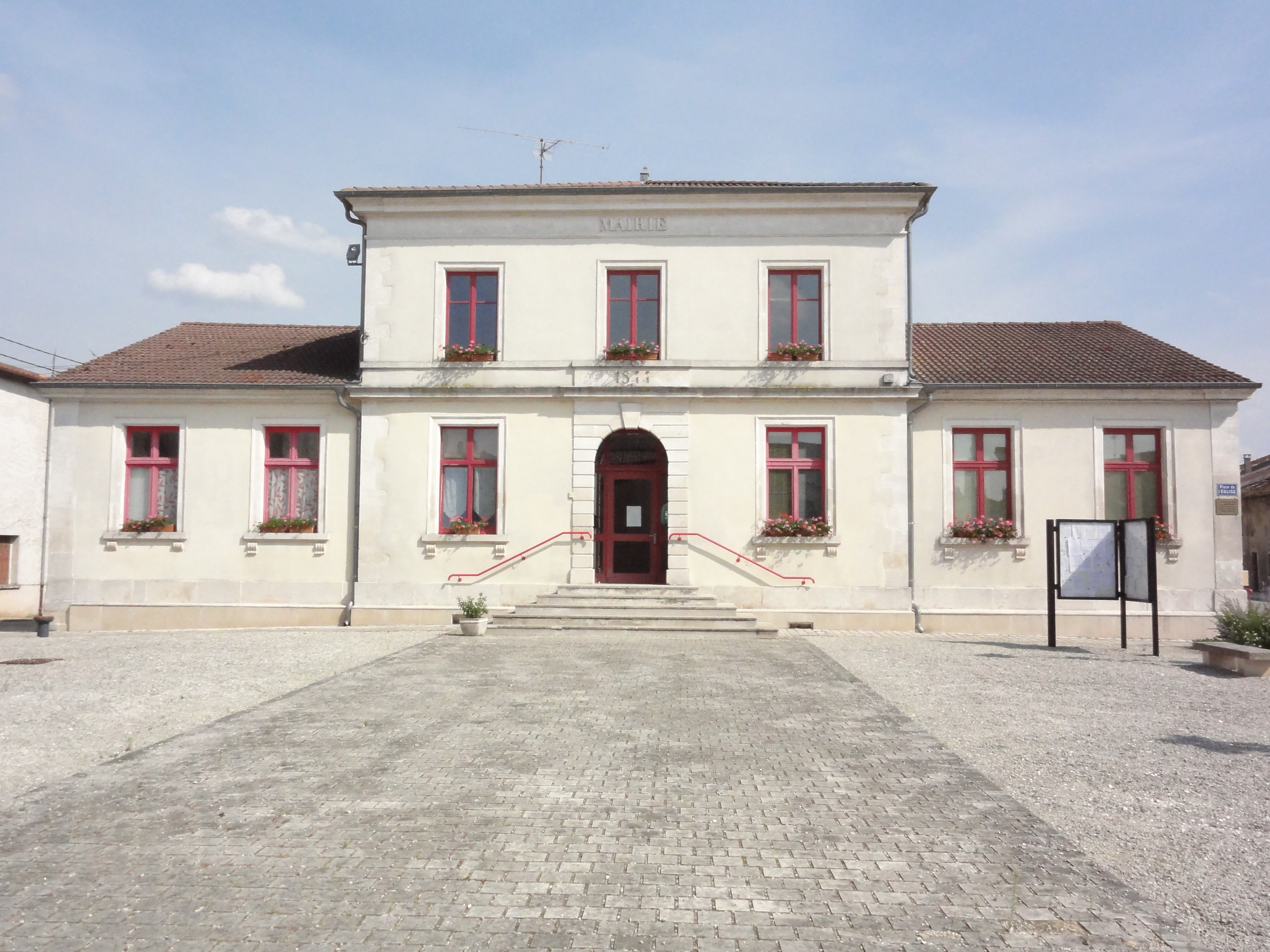
- The town hall in Troussey

- Coat of arms
- Location of Troussey
- Location within France Location within Grand Est
- Coordinates: 48°42′12″N 5°42′08″E
- Country: France
- Region: Grand Est
- Department: Meuse
- Arrondissement: Commercy
- Canton: Vaucouleurs

Government
  - Mayor (2020–2026): Alain Guillaume
- Area^{1}: 17.23 km^{2} (6.65 sq mi)
- Elevation: 241 m (791 ft)
- Highest elevation: 350 m (1,150 ft)
- Lowest elevation: 235 m (771 ft)
- Population (2023): 467
  - Density: 27.1/km^{2} (70.2/sq mi)
- Time zone: UTC+01:00 (CET)
  - Summer (DST): UTC+02:00 (CEST)
- INSEE/Postal code: 55520 /55190
- ^{1} French Land Register data, which excludes lakes, ponds, glaciers > 1 km^{2} (0.386 sq mi or 247 acres) and river estuaries.

Troussey (French pronunciation: [tʁusɛ]) is a commune in the Meuse department in Grand Est in north-eastern France.

== See also ==
- Communes of the Meuse department
