= Les Forges, Vosges =

Les Forges
- Commune
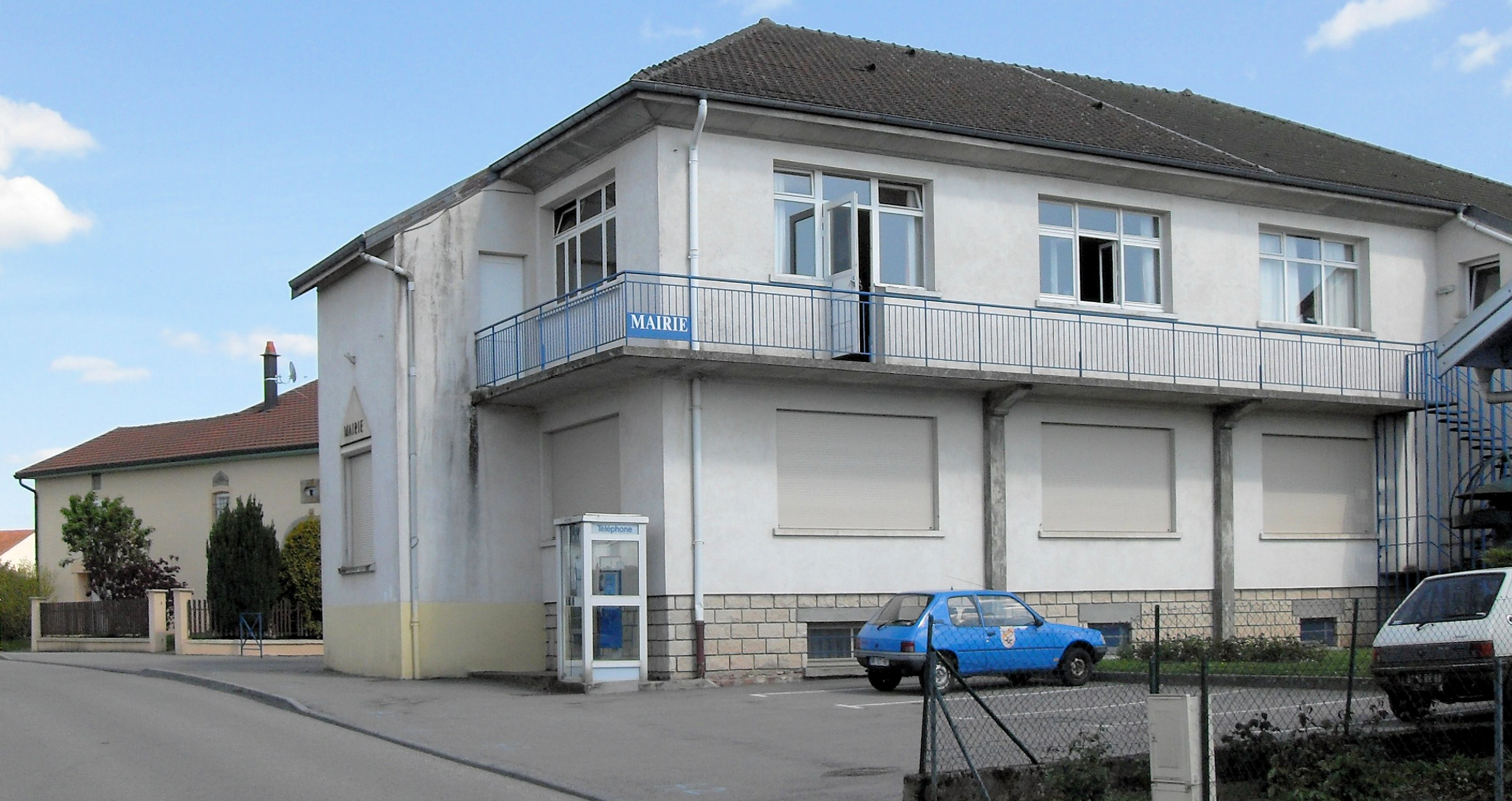
- The town hall in Les Forges

- Coat of arms
- Location of Les Forges
- Location within France Location within Grand Est
- Coordinates: 48°10′39″N 6°23′36″E
- Country: France
- Region: Grand Est
- Department: Vosges
- Arrondissement: Épinal
- Canton: Épinal-1
- Intercommunality: CA Épinal

Government
  - Mayor (2020–2026): Daniel Midon
- Area^{1}: 7.14 km^{2} (2.76 sq mi)
- Elevation: 356 m (1,168 ft)
- Highest elevation: 461 m (1,512 ft)
- Lowest elevation: 350 m (1,150 ft)
- Population (2023): 1,776
  - Density: 249/km^{2} (644/sq mi)
- Time zone: UTC+01:00 (CET)
  - Summer (DST): UTC+02:00 (CEST)
- INSEE/Postal code: 88178 /88390
- ^{1} French Land Register data, which excludes lakes, ponds, glaciers > 1 km^{2} (0.386 sq mi or 247 acres) and river estuaries.

Les Forges (French pronunciation: [le fɔʁʒ]) is a commune in the Vosges department in Grand Est in northeastern France.

== See also ==
- Communes of the Vosges department
