= Uzemain =

- Commune
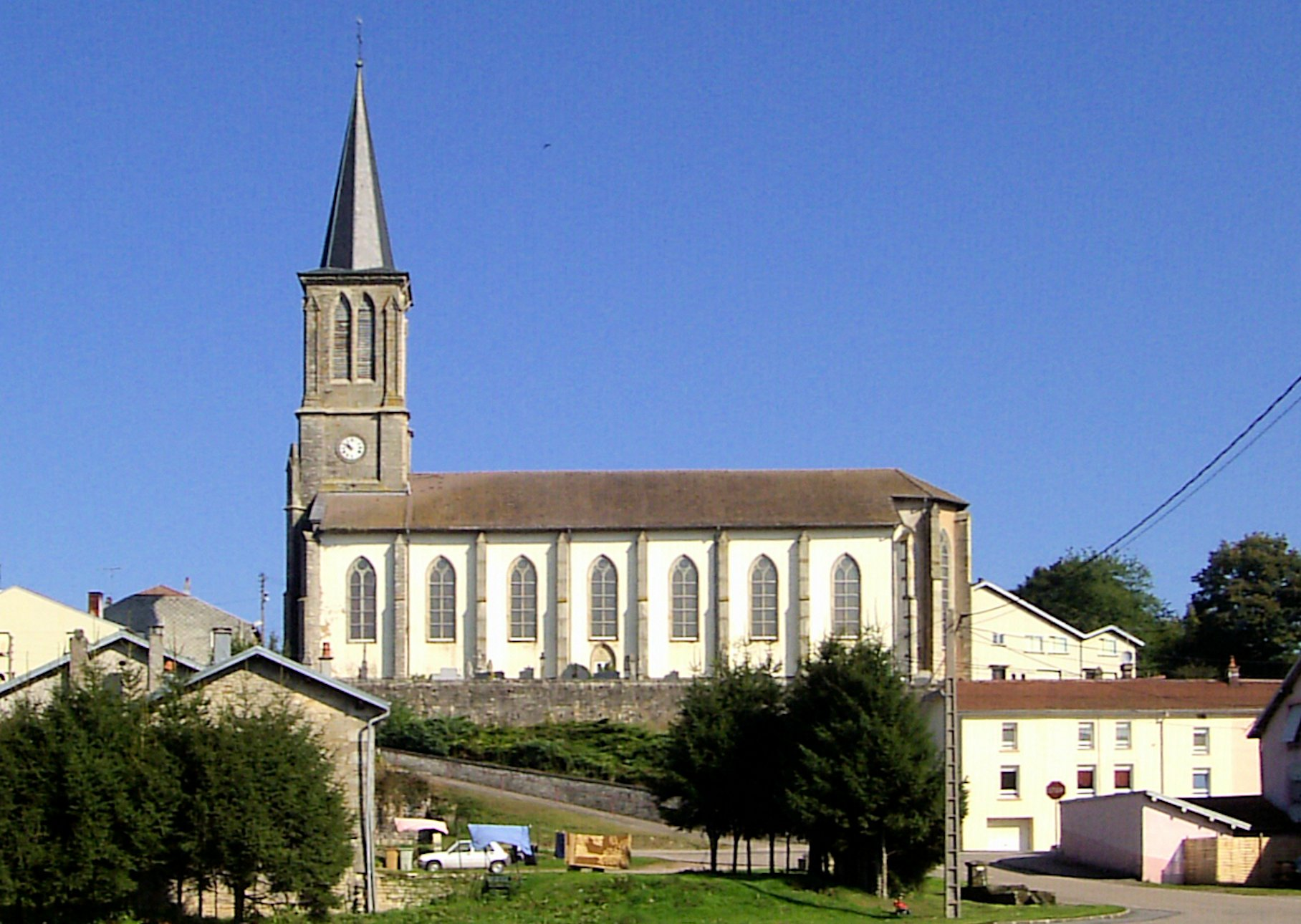
- Sainte-Madeleine
- Location of Uzemain
- Location within France Location within Grand Est
- Coordinates: 48°05′11″N 6°20′44″E
- Country: France
- Region: Grand Est
- Department: Vosges
- Arrondissement: Épinal
- Canton: Le Val-d'Ajol
- Intercommunality: CA Épinal

Government
  - Mayor (2020–2026): Pauline Babey-Foltzer
- Area^{1}: 27.3 km^{2} (10.5 sq mi)
- Elevation: 317 m (1,040 ft)
- Highest elevation: 467 m (1,532 ft)
- Lowest elevation: 305 m (1,001 ft)
- Population (2023): 1,046
  - Density: 38.3/km^{2} (99.2/sq mi)
- Time zone: UTC+01:00 (CET)
  - Summer (DST): UTC+02:00 (CEST)
- INSEE/Postal code: 88484 /88220
- Website: www.uzemain.fr
- ^{1} French Land Register data, which excludes lakes, ponds, glaciers > 1 km^{2} (0.386 sq mi or 247 acres) and river estuaries.

Uzemain (French pronunciation: [yzmɛ̃]) is a commune in the Vosges department in Grand Est in northeastern France.

== Geography ==
The Côney forms part of the commune's eastern border, flows westward through the southern part of the commune, crosses the village, and forms part of the commune's southwestern border.

== See also ==
- Communes of the Vosges department
