= Association of Vologne Valley communes =

The Association of Vologne Valley communes (French: Communauté de communes de la Vallée de la Vologne) is a former administrative association of communes in the Vosges département of eastern France and in the region of Lorraine. It was created in December 2002. It was merged into the new Communauté de communes Bruyères - Vallons des Vosges in January 2014.

The association, which took its name from the valley of the river Vologne, had its administrative offices at Bruyères.

== Composition ==
The Communauté de communes comprised the following communes:

1. Beauménil
2. Bruyères
3. Champ-le-Duc
4. Charmois-devant-Bruyères
5. Cheniménil
6. Deycimont
7. Docelles
8. Faucompierre
9. Fays
10. Fiménil
11. Laval-sur-Vologne
12. Laveline-devant-Bruyères
13. Laveline-du-Houx
14. Lépanges-sur-Vologne
15. La Neuveville-devant-Lépanges
16. Prey
17. Le Roulier-devant-Bruyères
18. Xamontarupt
