= Association of Arentèle-Durbion-Padozel communes =

The Association of Arentèle-Durbion-Padozel communes (French: Communauté de communes de l'Arentèle-Durbion-Padozel) is a former French administrative association of communes in the Vosges département of eastern France and in the region of Lorraine. It was created in October 2003 and had its administrative offices at Girecourt-sur-Durbion. It was merged into the Communauté de communes Bruyères - Vallons des Vosges in January 2014.

== Composition ==
ADP

The Communauté de communes comprised the following communes:

- Dompierre
- Destord
- Fontenay
- Girecourt-sur-Durbion
- Grandvillers
- Gugnécourt
- Méménil
- Nonzeville
- Padoux
- Pierrepont-sur-l'Arentèle
- Sercoeur
- Viménil
