= Méménil =

- Commune
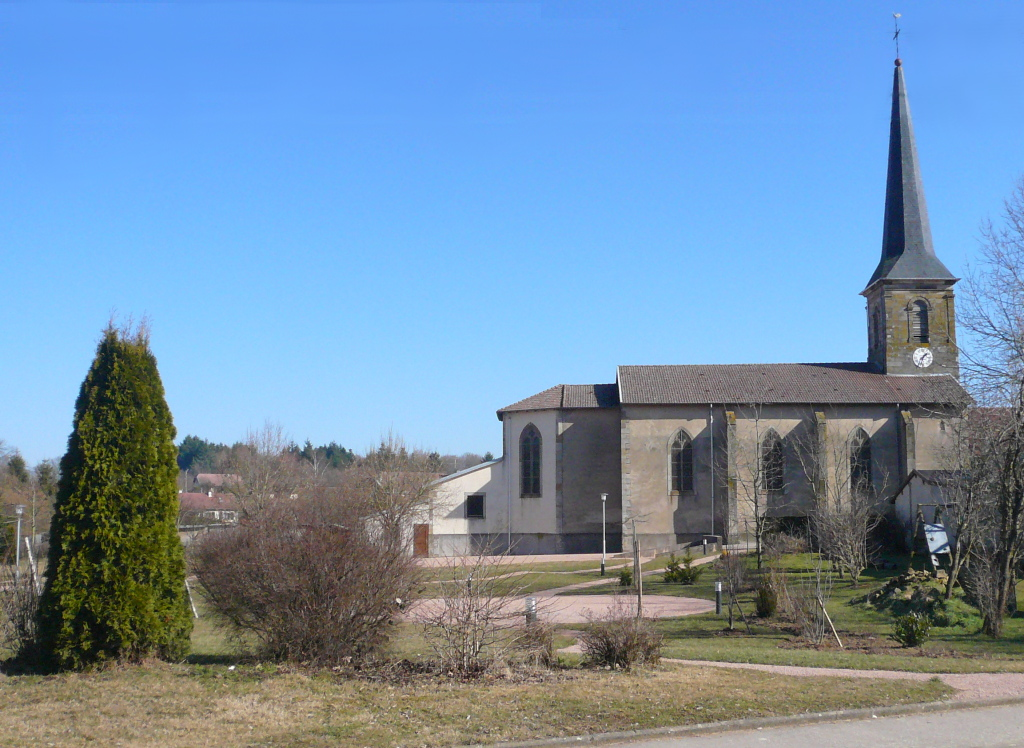
- The church in Méménil
- Location of Méménil
- Location within France Location within Grand Est
- Coordinates: 48°13′16″N 6°36′42″E
- Country: France
- Region: Grand Est
- Department: Vosges
- Arrondissement: Saint-Dié-des-Vosges
- Canton: Bruyères
- Intercommunality: CC Bruyères - Vallons des Vosges

Government
  - Mayor (2020–2026): Jean-Charles Collot
- Area^{1}: 9.15 km^{2} (3.53 sq mi)
- Highest elevation: 582 m (1,909 ft)
- Lowest elevation: 343 m (1,125 ft)
- Population (2023): 181
  - Density: 19.8/km^{2} (51.2/sq mi)
- Time zone: UTC+01:00 (CET)
  - Summer (DST): UTC+02:00 (CEST)
- INSEE/Postal code: 88297 /88600
- ^{1} French Land Register data, which excludes lakes, ponds, glaciers > 1 km^{2} (0.386 sq mi or 247 acres) and river estuaries.

Méménil (French pronunciation: [memenil]) is a commune in the Vosges department in Grand Est in northeastern France.

== Geography ==
Méménil is positioned some ten kilometres (six miles) to the east-north-east of Épinal, along one of the routes to Saint-Dié-des-Vosges. Surrounding communes are Fontenay to the west, Girecourt-sur-Durbion to the north and Viménil to the east. The forested hillside to the south of the village is part of the commune of Méménil.

The commune is surrounded by forests and is crossed by two little streams, the Rouot and the Grande Roye: these cross the north of the commune through an unusually complex array of little channels before both feed into the little River Durbion, which itself runs through the commune to the east of the village itself.

== History ==
The name Memesnil dates back at least to 1594 when Méménil was part of the territory belonging to Dompierre under the bailiwick of Bruyere. In 1656 there is a reference to the village as Memeny.

The Church, consecrated to the Assumption of Our Lady, was controlled by the parish of nearby Aydoilles.

It is recorded that in 1892 the 60 families of the village owned between them 140 head of cattle.

On 27 September 1944, towards the end of the Second World War, 70 buildings suffered in a German bombing attack. Victims included the church windows.

== Features ==
The village is the setting for a Christmas market at the end of each November.

The Church of the Assumption of Our Lady retains its dominating position in the heart of the village: villagers are particularly proud of three substantial church bells: Agathe (321 kg), Anne (440 kg) and Marie herself (647 kn).

Watercourses at Méménil

== See also ==
- Communes of the Vosges department
