= Nonzeville =

- Commune
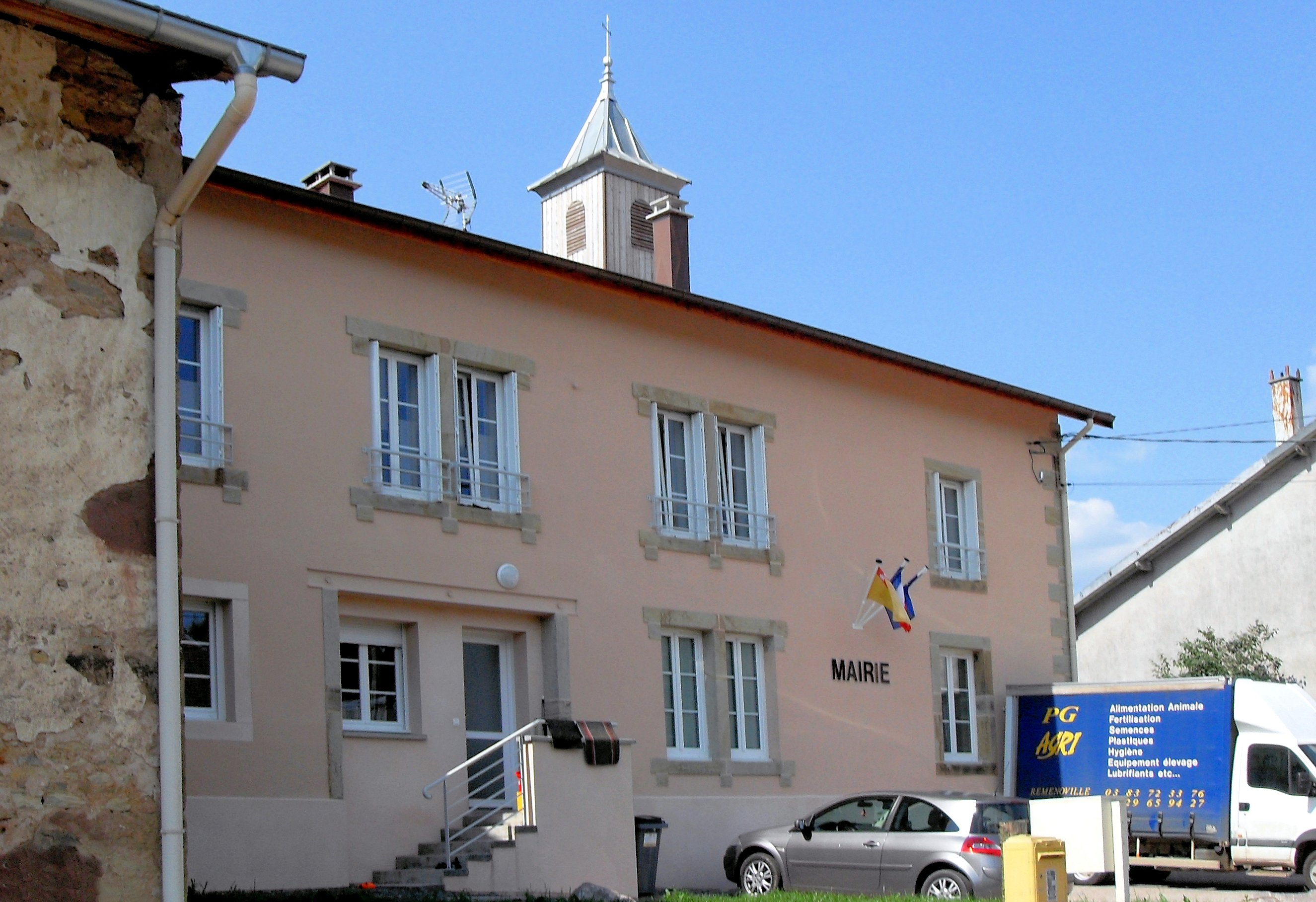
- The town hall in Nonzeville

- Coat of arms
- Location of Nonzeville
- Location within France Location within Grand Est
- Coordinates: 48°15′57″N 6°38′04″E
- Country: France
- Region: Grand Est
- Department: Vosges
- Arrondissement: Saint-Dié-des-Vosges
- Canton: Bruyères
- Intercommunality: CC Bruyères - Vallons des Vosges

Government
  - Mayor (2020–2026): Ludovic Didierjean
- Area^{1}: 1.62 km^{2} (0.63 sq mi)
- Elevation: 340 m (1,120 ft)
- Highest elevation: 362 m (1,188 ft)
- Lowest elevation: 332 m (1,089 ft)
- Population (2023): 56
  - Density: 35/km^{2} (90/sq mi)
- Time zone: UTC+01:00 (CET)
  - Summer (DST): UTC+02:00 (CEST)
- INSEE/Postal code: 88331 /88600
- ^{1} French Land Register data, which excludes lakes, ponds, glaciers > 1 km^{2} (0.386 sq mi or 247 acres) and river estuaries.

Nonzeville (French pronunciation: [nɔ̃zvil]) is a commune in the Vosges department in Grand Est in northeastern France.

Inhabitants are called Nonzevillois.

== Geography ==
Nonzeville is the smallest commune by area in the department. It is situated at the confluence of several very minor roads to the south of Rambervillers and to the north-west of Bruyères, being about 12 kilometres (7 mi) from each. The commune contains the source of a spring called the Soie which joins up with the Arentèle in the neighbouring commune of Pierrepont.

== History ==
The earliest surviving record of the village dates from the tenth century when it was named as Nuntiavilla, which might be translated from Latin as the foretelling town or the town of the annunciation (ville annonciatrice).

Later versions of the name that turn up include Lonzéville or indeed Nonzéville. Long before the French Revolution the village was part of the Vaudicourt territory (ban de Vaudicourt), owned by the Abbey of Remiremont. The main street indeed continued to be called the Rue du ban de Vaudicourt until the nineteenth century.

Population probably peaked in the middle of the sixteenth century, when an estimate based on the number of homesteads implies a population of 193. However, by the end of the Thirty Years War it had declined to an estimated level of just 29 in 1648 thanks, presumably, to the triple war induced evils of that time, massacres, famine and plague. The village population never recovered during the ancien regime period. The population returned to 195 registered at the time of the 1831 census, but thereafter the pattern of population decline has mirrored the experience of many Lorraine villages, as commercial opportunities, factory wages and overseas emigration attracted villagers of working age away from the countryside, a trend exacerbated by the decline in farm incomes that followed the agricultural depression of the 1870s.

The commune does not have its own church. For church matters it depends on the parish of Saint Rémi down the hill at Destord.

== See also ==
- Communes of the Vosges department
