= Deycimont =

- Commune
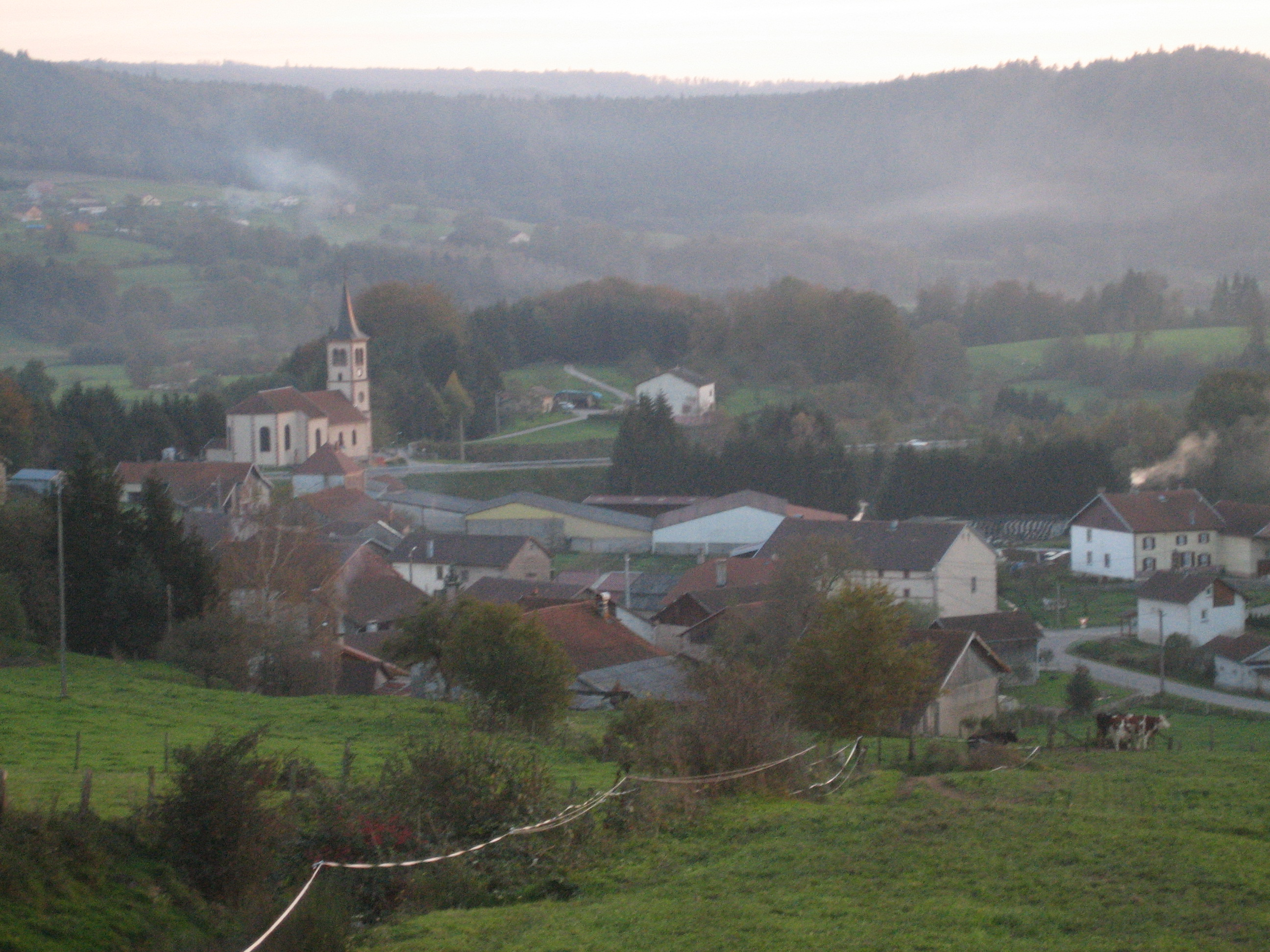
- A general view of Deycimont

- Coat of arms
- Location of Deycimont
- Location within France Location within Grand Est
- Coordinates: 48°10′08″N 6°39′03″E
- Country: France
- Region: Grand Est
- Department: Vosges
- Arrondissement: Saint-Dié-des-Vosges
- Canton: Bruyères
- Intercommunality: CC Bruyères - Vallons des Vosges

Government
  - Mayor (2020–2026): Eric Aubry
- Area^{1}: 6.32 km^{2} (2.44 sq mi)
- Highest elevation: 587 m (1,926 ft)
- Lowest elevation: 383 m (1,257 ft)
- Population (2023): 292
  - Density: 46.2/km^{2} (120/sq mi)
- Time zone: UTC+01:00 (CET)
  - Summer (DST): UTC+02:00 (CEST)
- INSEE/Postal code: 88131 /88600
- ^{1} French Land Register data, which excludes lakes, ponds, glaciers > 1 km^{2} (0.386 sq mi or 247 acres) and river estuaries.

Deycimont (French pronunciation: [desimɔ̃]) is a commune in the Vosges department in Grand Est in northeastern France. The residents are known as Rouges-Fournants ("Red Oveners")

== Geography ==
In the Vologne valley, between Lépanges and Docelles, Deycimont is built under the Recreux mountain. The brooks la Bouillante and le Rupt du Void go through the village.

The two main hamlets which depend on Deycimont are le Faing Vairel and la Haute Verrière.

Several farms and a weaving factory can be found there, as in the whole region.

== History ==
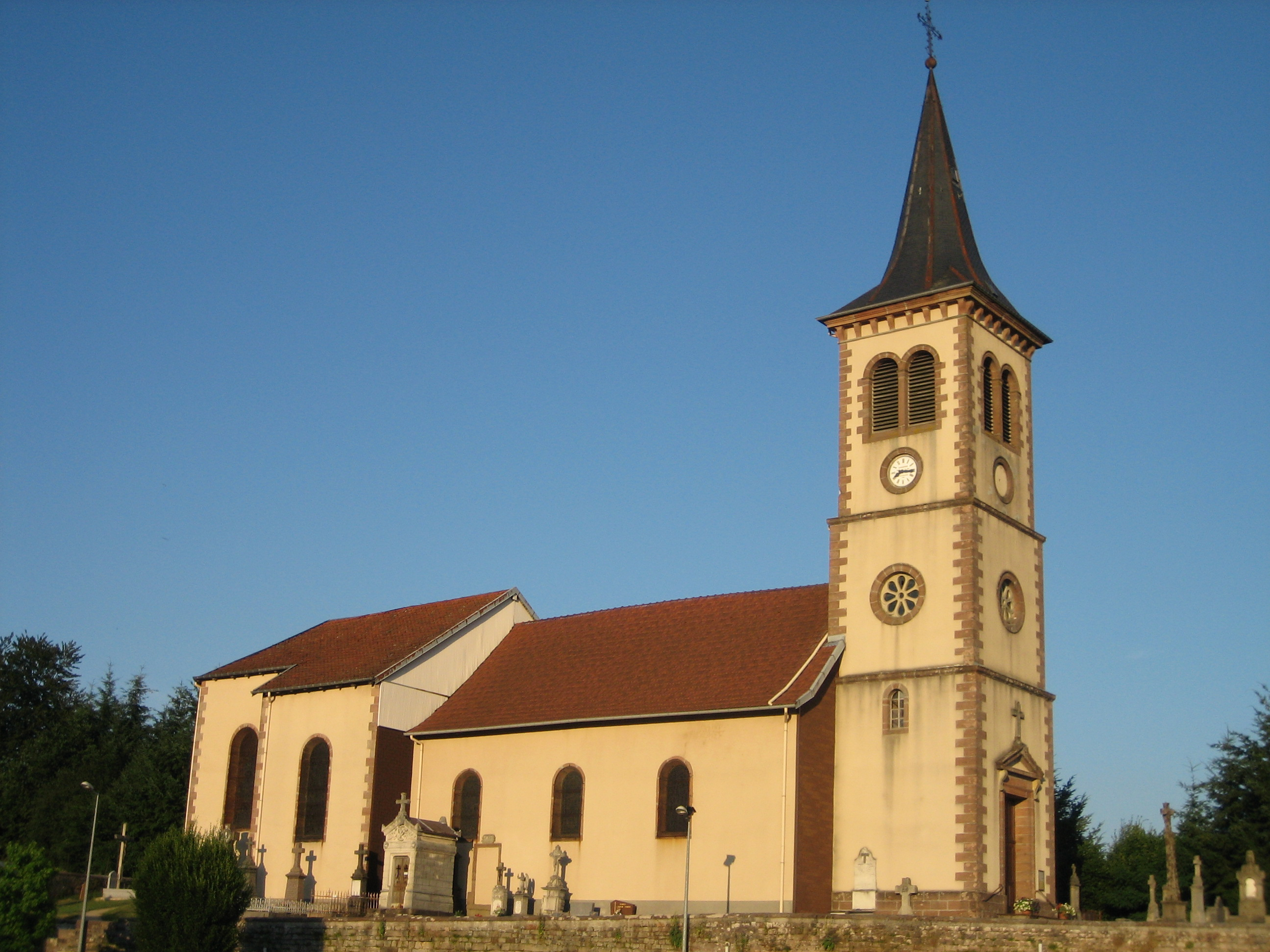
Sainte-Menne's church

The name of Deycimont has been known since 1232 but there certainly were some houses in the Antiquity, because old Celtic and Roman coins have been found. The name of the town could mean "Decius Mountain".

The church, dedicated to Sainte Menne, was first built between 1050 and 1080 by the bishop of Toul. It was rebuilt in 1711.

== Population ==
The village, like many others, suffered during the Thirty Years' War. During this period, more than three-quarters of the population perished. By the end of the war, in 1648, the population had dwindled to 20 inhabitants. However, the population rebounded significantly over the subsequent fifty years, reaching pre-war levels.

During the eighteenth century, the population increased dramatically, from around 100 in 1708 to well over 300 in 1806. This period of growth was followed by a mild decline in the twentieth century. However, there has been renewed growth in the early part of the twenty-first century.

Historical population

Year	Pop.	±% p.a.
1503	40	—
1585	108	+1.22%
1602	86	−1.33%
1648	20	−3.12%
1708	99	+2.70%
1793	287	+1.26%
1806	334	+1.17%
1846	402	+0.46%
1906	310	−0.43%
1954	262	−0.35%

Year	Pop.	±% p.a.
1962	202	−3.20%
1968	231	+2.26%
1975	244	+0.79%
1982	250	+0.35%
1990	238	−0.61%
1999	236	−0.09%
2007	270	+1.70%
2012	316	+3.20%
2017	309	−0.45%
2023	292	−0.94%

Source: EHESS (1793-1999) and INSEE (1968-2023)

== Personalities ==
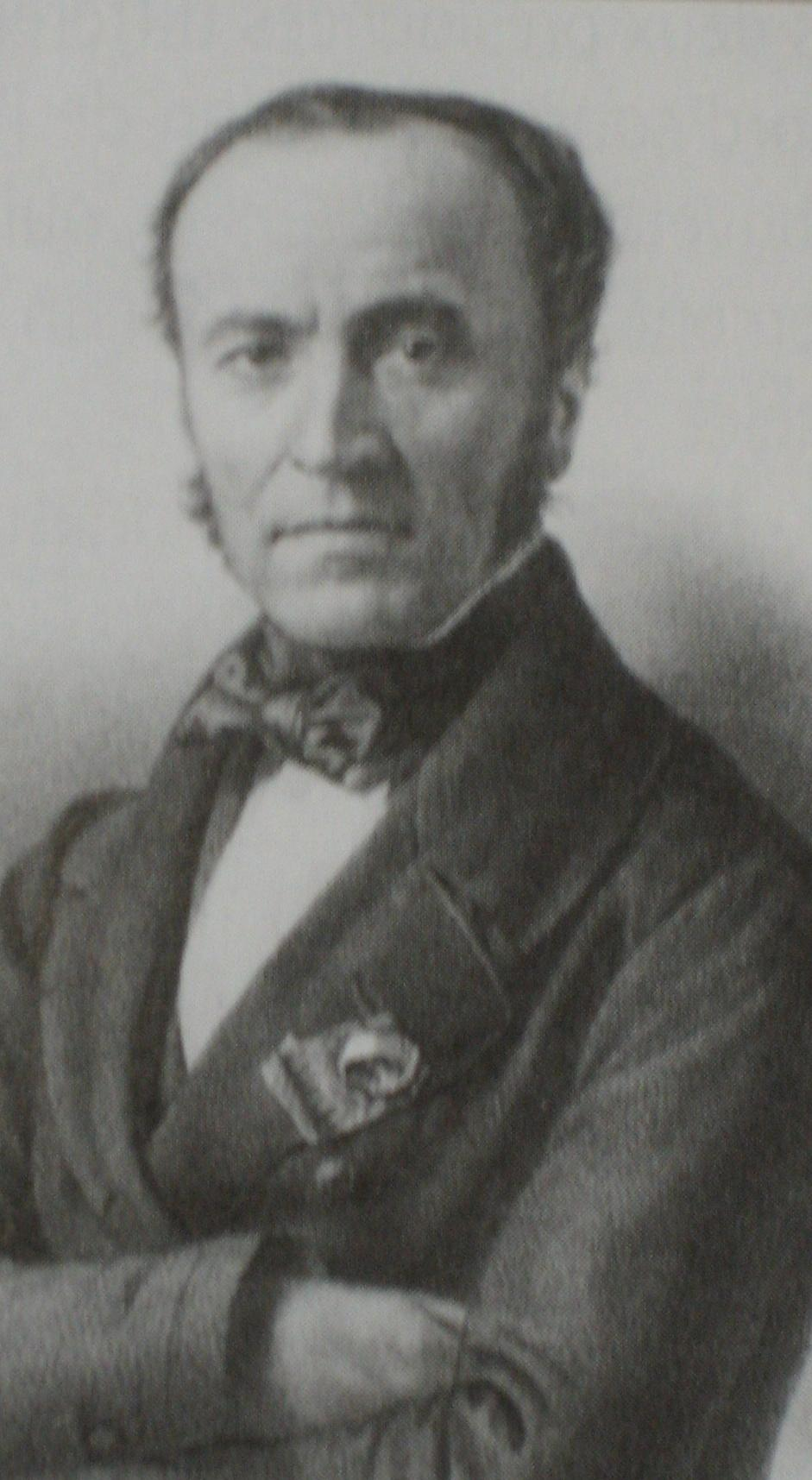
Jean Hubert Houël

Jean Hubert Houël was born in Deycimont on April 4, 1802 and died in Saint-Dié on October 20, 1889. He was among the members imprisoned after the coup of December 2, 1851 after signing the letters of impeachment against President Louis-Napoléon Bonaparte. He gave up politics after this short detention.

== See also ==
- Communes of the Vosges department
