= Arrondissement of Saint-Dié-des-Vosges =

Coordinates: 48.28°N 6.95°E

Saint-Dié-des-Vosges
- Arrondissement
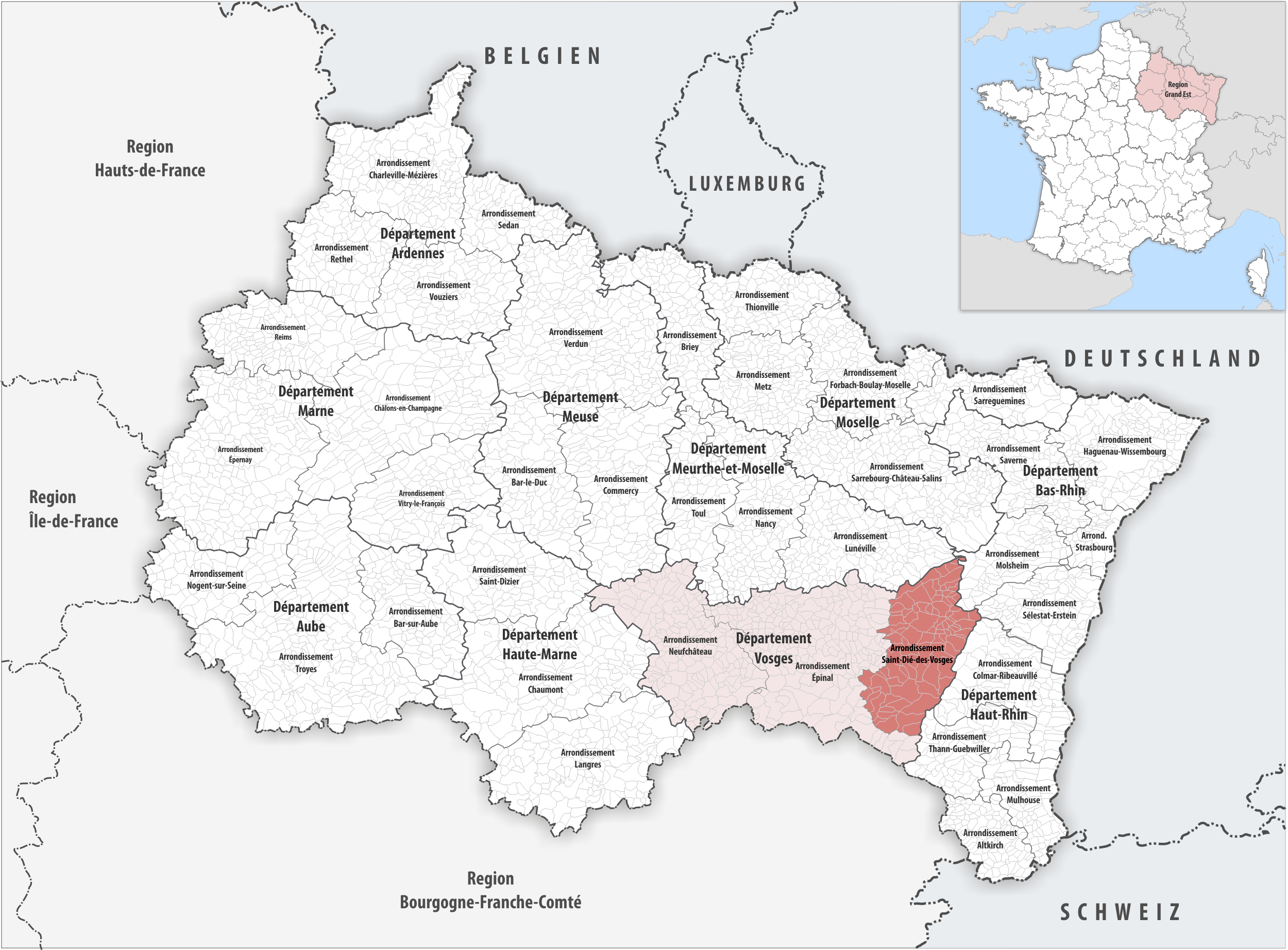
- Location within the region Grand Est
- Country: France
- Region: Grand Est
- Department: Vosges
- No. of communes: {{{nbcomm}}}
- Area: 1,373.0 km^{2} (530.1 sq mi)
- Population (2023): 100,920
  - Density: 73.503/km^{2} (190.37/sq mi)
- INSEE code: 883

The arrondissement of Saint-Dié-des-Vosges is an arrondissement of France in the Vosges department in the Grand Est région. It has 116 communes. Its population is 102,238 (2021), and its area is 1,373.0 km^{2} (530.1 sq mi).

== Composition ==
The communes of the arrondissement of Saint-Dié-des-Vosges, and their INSEE codes, are:

1. Allarmont (88005)
2. Anould (88009)
3. Arrentès-de-Corcieux (88014)
4. Ban-de-Laveline (88032)
5. Ban-de-Sapt (88033)
6. Ban-sur-Meurthe-Clefcy (88106)
7. Barbey-Seroux (88035)
8. Beauménil (88046)
9. Belmont-sur-Buttant (88050)
10. Belval (88053)
11. Bertrimoutier (88054)
12. Le Beulay (88057)
13. Biffontaine (88059)
14. Bois-de-Champ (88064)
15. La Bourgonce (88068)
16. Brouvelieures (88076)
17. Bruyères (88078)
18. Celles-sur-Plaine (88082)
19. Champdray (88085)
20. Champ-le-Duc (88086)
21. La Chapelle-devant-Bruyères (88089)
22. Charmois-devant-Bruyères (88091)
23. Châtas (88093)
24. Cheniménil (88101)
25. Coinches (88111)
26. Combrimont (88113)
27. Corcieux (88115)
28. La Croix-aux-Mines (88120)
29. Denipaire (88128)
30. Destord (88130)
31. Deycimont (88131)
32. Docelles (88135)
33. Domfaing (88145)
34. Entre-deux-Eaux (88159)
35. Étival-Clairefontaine (88165)
36. Faucompierre (88167)
37. Fays (88169)
38. Fiménil (88172)
39. Fontenay (88175)
40. Fraize (88181)
41. Frapelle (88182)
42. Fremifontaine (88184)
43. Gemaingoutte (88193)
44. Gérardmer (88196)
45. Gerbépal (88198)
46. Girecourt-sur-Durbion (88203)
47. La Grande-Fosse (88213)
48. Grandrupt (88215)
49. Grandvillers (88216)
50. Granges-Aumontzey (88218)
51. Gugnécourt (88222)
52. Herpelmont (88240)
53. La Houssière (88244)
54. Hurbache (88245)
55. Jussarupt (88256)
56. Laval-sur-Vologne (88261)
57. Laveline-devant-Bruyères (88262)
58. Laveline-du-Houx (88263)
59. Lépanges-sur-Vologne (88266)
60. Lesseux (88268)
61. Liézey (88269)
62. Lubine (88275)
63. Lusse (88276)
64. Luvigny (88277)
65. Mandray (88284)
66. Méménil (88297)
67. Ménil-de-Senones (88300)
68. Le Mont (88306)
69. Mortagne (88315)
70. Moussey (88317)
71. Moyenmoutier (88319)
72. Nayemont-les-Fosses (88320)
73. La Neuveville-devant-Lépanges (88322)
74. Neuvillers-sur-Fave (88326)
75. Nompatelize (88328)
76. Nonzeville (88331)
77. Pair-et-Grandrupt (88341)
78. La Petite-Fosse (88345)
79. La Petite-Raon (88346)
80. Pierrepont-sur-l'Arentèle (88348)
81. Plainfaing (88349)
82. Les Poulières (88356)
83. Prey (88359)
84. Provenchères-et-Colroy (88361)
85. Le Puid (88362)
86. Raon-l'Étape (88372)
87. Raon-sur-Plaine (88373)
88. Raves (88375)
89. Rehaupal (88380)
90. Remomeix (88386)
91. Les Rouges-Eaux (88398)
92. Le Roulier (88399)
93. Saint-Dié-des-Vosges (88413)
94. Sainte-Marguerite (88424)
95. Saint-Jean-d'Ormont (88419)
96. Saint-Léonard (88423)
97. Saint-Michel-sur-Meurthe (88428)
98. Saint-Remy (88435)
99. Saint-Stail (88436)
100. La Salle (88438)
101. Le Saulcy (88444)
102. Saulcy-sur-Meurthe (88445)
103. Senones (88451)
104. Taintrux (88463)
105. Le Tholy (88470)
106. Le Valtin (88492)
107. Le Vermont (88501)
108. Vervezelle (88502)
109. Vexaincourt (88503)
110. Vienville (88505)
111. Vieux-Moulin (88506)
112. Viménil (88512)
113. La Voivre (88519)
114. Wisembach (88526)
115. Xamontarupt (88528)
116. Xonrupt-Longemer (88531)

== History ==
The arrondissement of Saint-Dié-des-Vosges was created in 1800. At the January 2019 reorganisation of the arrondissements of Vosges, it lost seven communes to and gained 15 communes from the arrondissement of Épinal. At the January 2024 reorganisation of the arrondissements of Vosges, it lost 14 communes to and gained 34 communes from the arrondissement of Épinal.

As a result of the reorganisation of the cantons of France which came into effect in 2015, the borders of the cantons are no longer related to the borders of the arrondissements. The cantons of the arrondissement of Saint-Dié-des-Vosges were, as of January 2015:

1. Brouvelieures
2. Corcieux
3. Fraize
4. Gérardmer
5. Provenchères-sur-Fave
6. Raon-l'Étape
7. Saint-Dié-des-Vosges-Est
8. Saint-Dié-des-Vosges-Ouest
9. Senones
