= Charmois-devant-Bruyères =

- Commune
- Location of Charmois-devant-Bruyères
- Location within France Location within Grand Est
- Coordinates: 48°10′09″N 6°35′38″E
- Country: France
- Region: Grand Est
- Department: Vosges
- Arrondissement: Saint-Dié-des-Vosges
- Canton: Bruyères
- Intercommunality: CC Bruyères - Vallons des Vosges

Government
  - Mayor (2020–2026): Patrick Moulin
- Area^{1}: 6.61 km^{2} (2.55 sq mi)
- Highest elevation: 503 m (1,650 ft)
- Lowest elevation: 385 m (1,263 ft)
- Population (2023): 373
  - Density: 56.4/km^{2} (146/sq mi)
- Time zone: UTC+01:00 (CET)
  - Summer (DST): UTC+02:00 (CEST)
- INSEE/Postal code: 88091 /88460
- ^{1} French Land Register data, which excludes lakes, ponds, glaciers > 1 km^{2} (0.386 sq mi or 247 acres) and river estuaries.

Charmois-devant-Bruyères (French pronunciation: [ʃaʁmwa dəvɑ̃ bʁɥijɛʁ], literally Charmois before Bruyères) is a commune in the Vosges department in Grand Est in northeastern France.

== See also ==
- Communes of the Vosges department
