= Herpelmont =

- Commune
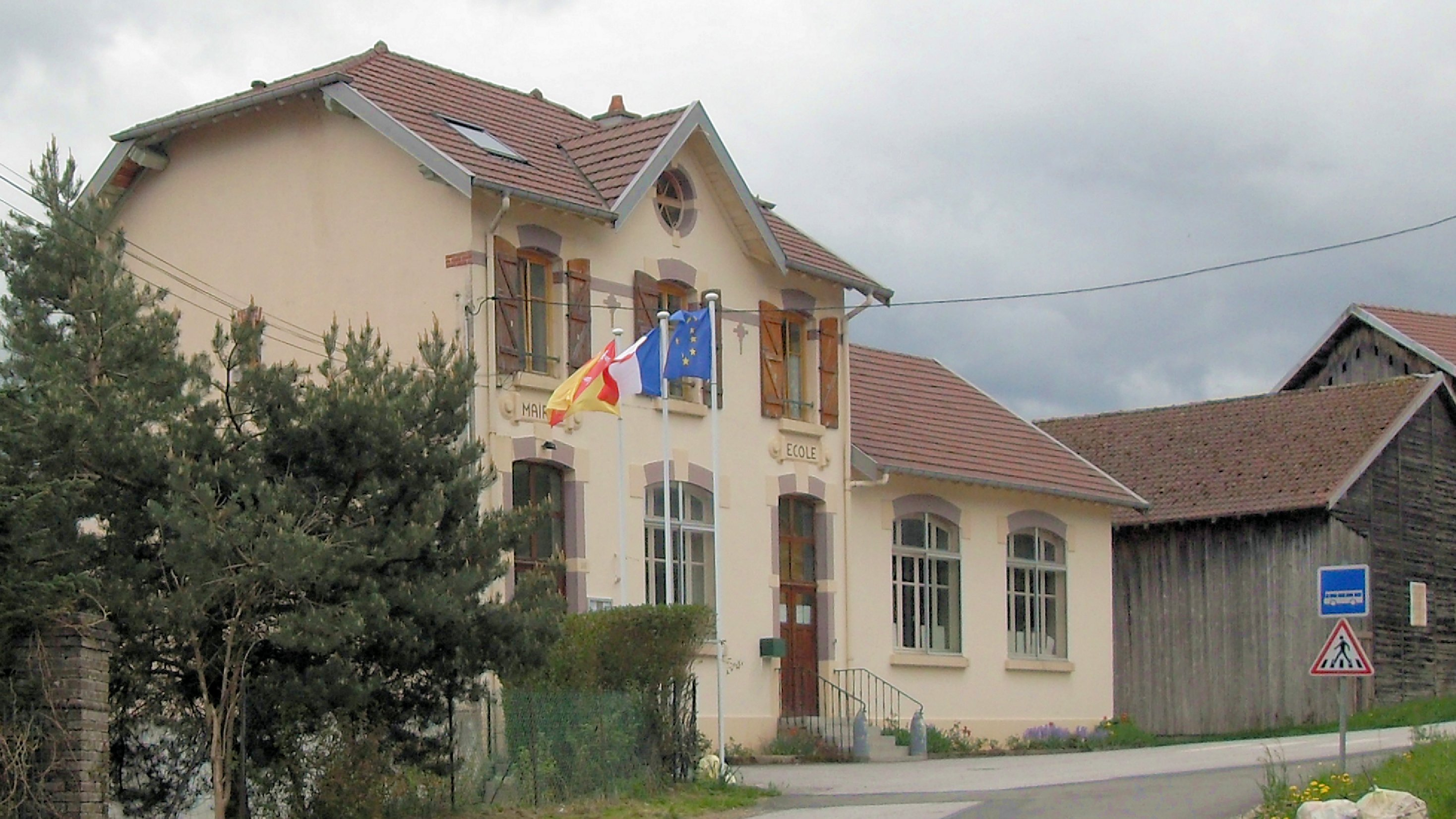
- The town hall and school in Herpelmont
- Location of Herpelmont
- Location within France Location within Grand Est
- Coordinates: 48°10′13″N 6°44′25″E
- Country: France
- Region: Grand Est
- Department: Vosges
- Arrondissement: Saint-Dié-des-Vosges
- Canton: Bruyères
- Intercommunality: CC Bruyères - Vallons des Vosges

Government
  - Mayor (2020–2026): Raphaël Mangin
- Area^{1}: 5.58 km^{2} (2.15 sq mi)
- Elevation: 470 m (1,540 ft)
- Highest elevation: 700 m (2,300 ft)
- Lowest elevation: 439 m (1,440 ft)
- Population (2023): 261
  - Density: 46.8/km^{2} (121/sq mi)
- Time zone: UTC+01:00 (CET)
  - Summer (DST): UTC+02:00 (CEST)
- INSEE/Postal code: 88240 /88600
- ^{1} French Land Register data, which excludes lakes, ponds, glaciers > 1 km^{2} (0.386 sq mi or 247 acres) and river estuaries.

Herpelmont (French pronunciation: [ɛʁpɛlmɔ̃]) is a commune in the Vosges department in Grand Est in northeastern France.

== See also ==
- Communes of the Vosges department
