= Canton of Bruyères =

Coordinates: 48°12′38″N 6°43′10″E

Bruyères
- Canton
- Country: France
- Region: Grand Est
- Department: Vosges
- No. of communes: {{{nbcomm}}}
- Area: 399.27 km^{2} (154.16 sq mi)
- Population (2023): 19,377
  - Density: 48.531/km^{2} (125.69/sq mi)
- INSEE code: 88 02

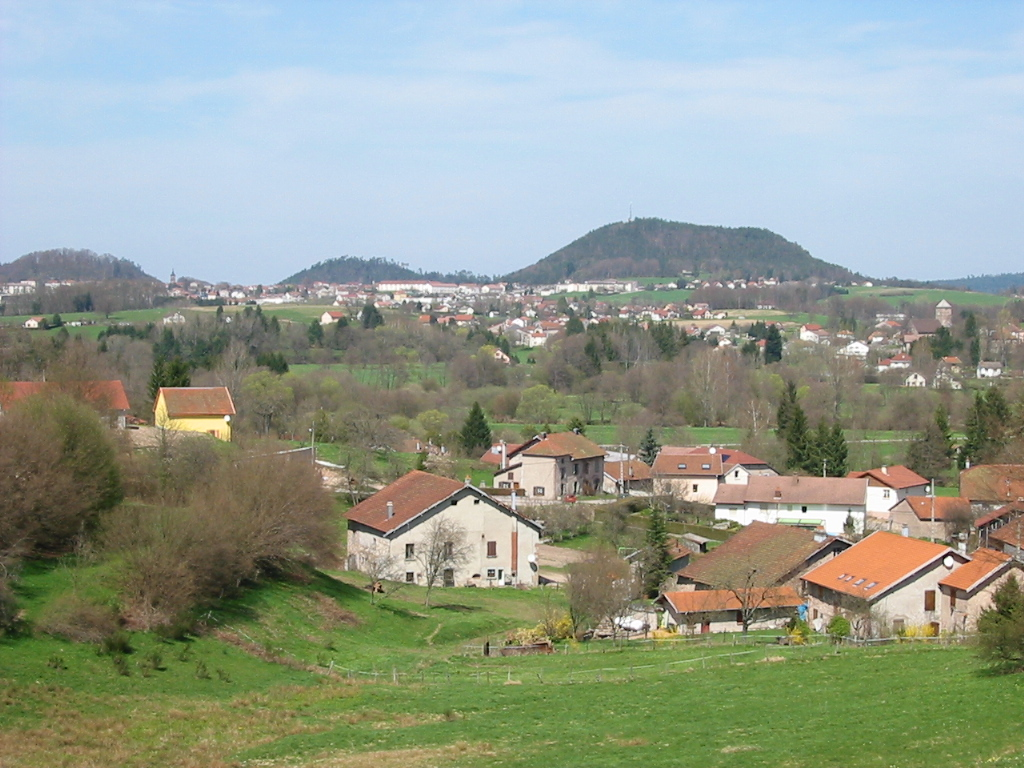
Countryside between Bruyères and Fiménil

The Canton of Bruyères is a largely rural French administrative and electoral grouping of communes in the Vosges département of eastern France and in the region of Grand Est. The canton has its administrative centre at Bruyères.

== Composition ==
At the French canton reorganisation which came into effect in March 2015, the canton was expanded from 30 to 51 communes:

- Aydoilles
- Badménil-aux-Bois
- Bayecourt
- Beauménil
- Belmont-sur-Buttant
- Biffontaine
- Bois-de-Champ
- Brouvelieures
- Bruyères
- Champdray
- Champ-le-Duc
- Charmois-devant-Bruyères
- Cheniménil
- Destord
- Deycimont
- Docelles
- Domèvre-sur-Durbion
- Domfaing
- Dompierre
- Fays
- Fiménil
- Fontenay
- Fremifontaine
- Girecourt-sur-Durbion
- Grandvillers
- Gugnécourt
- Herpelmont
- Jussarupt
- Laval-sur-Vologne
- Laveline-devant-Bruyères
- Laveline-du-Houx
- Lépanges-sur-Vologne
- Méménil
- Mortagne
- La Neuveville-devant-Lépanges
- Nonzeville
- Padoux
- Pallegney
- Pierrepont-sur-l'Arentèle
- Les Poulières
- Prey
- Rehaupal
- Les Rouges-Eaux
- Le Roulier
- Sainte-Hélène
- Sercœur
- Vervezelle
- Villoncourt
- Viménil
- Xamontarupt
- Zincourt
