= La Neuveville-devant-Lépanges =

- Commune
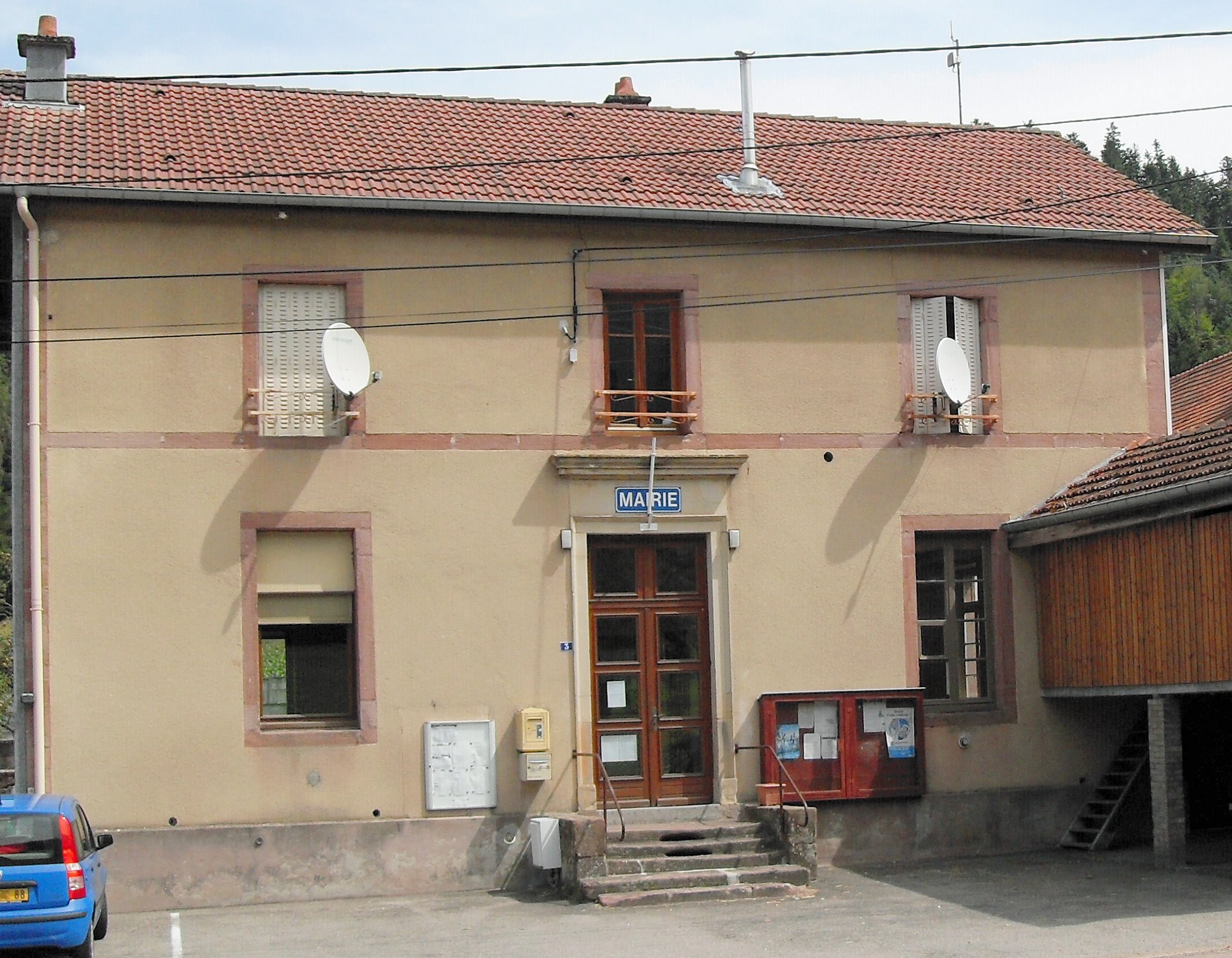
- The old town hall in Saint-Jean-du-Marché
- Location of La Neuveville-devant-Lépanges
- Location within France Location within Grand Est
- Coordinates: 48°09′44″N 6°39′49″E
- Country: France
- Region: Grand Est
- Department: Vosges
- Arrondissement: Saint-Dié-des-Vosges
- Canton: Bruyères
- Intercommunality: CC Bruyères - Vallons des Vosges

Government
  - Mayor (2020–2026): Damien Adam
- Area^{1}: 8.77 km^{2} (3.39 sq mi)
- Highest elevation: 649 m (2,129 ft)
- Lowest elevation: 383 m (1,257 ft)
- Population (2023): 493
  - Density: 56.2/km^{2} (146/sq mi)
- Time zone: UTC+01:00 (CET)
  - Summer (DST): UTC+02:00 (CEST)
- INSEE/Postal code: 88322 /88600
- ^{1} French Land Register data, which excludes lakes, ponds, glaciers > 1 km^{2} (0.386 sq mi or 247 acres) and river estuaries.

La Neuveville-devant-Lépanges (French pronunciation: [la nœv.vil dəvɑ̃ lepɑ̃ʒ], literally La Neuveville before Lépanges) is a commune in the Vosges department in Grand Est in northeastern France.

== See also ==
- Communes of the Vosges department
