= Champdray =

- Commune
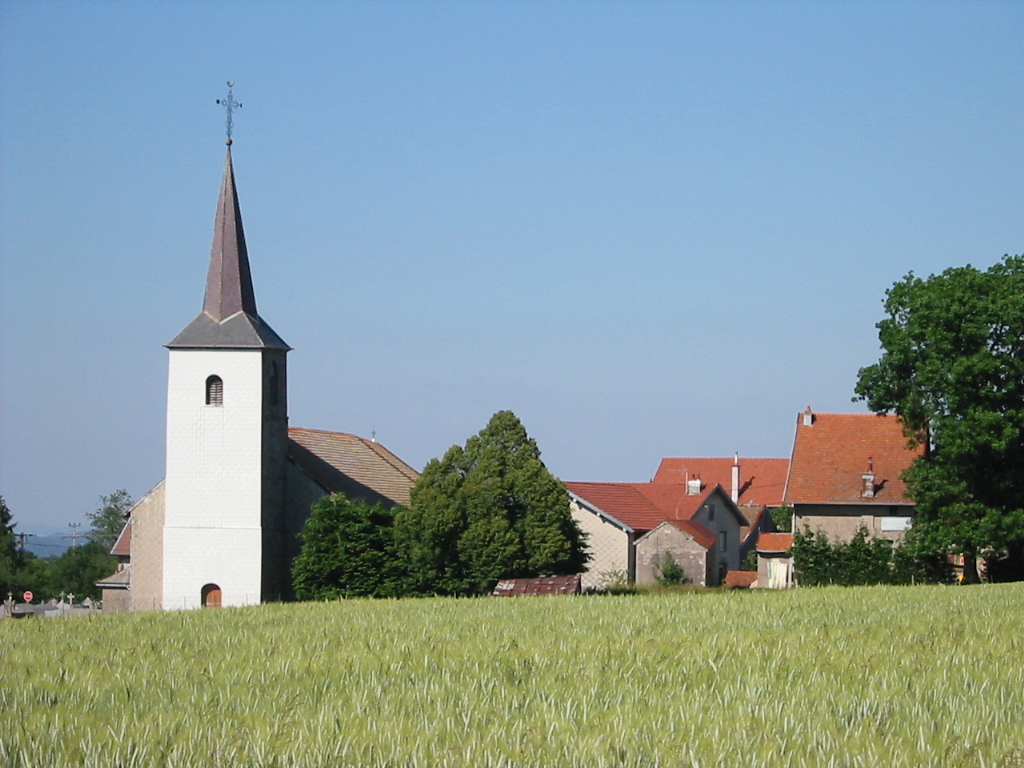
- The church and surroundings in Champdray
- Location of Champdray
- Location within France Location within Grand Est
- Coordinates: 48°08′10″N 6°45′13″E
- Country: France
- Region: Grand Est
- Department: Vosges
- Arrondissement: Saint-Dié-des-Vosges
- Canton: Bruyères
- Intercommunality: CC Gérardmer Hautes Vosges

Government
  - Mayor (2020–2026): Élisabeth Klipfel
- Area^{1}: 9.49 km^{2} (3.66 sq mi)
- Elevation: 712 m (2,336 ft)
- Highest elevation: 809 m (2,654 ft)
- Lowest elevation: 589 m (1,932 ft)
- Population (2023): 192
  - Density: 20.2/km^{2} (52.4/sq mi)
- Time zone: UTC+01:00 (CET)
  - Summer (DST): UTC+02:00 (CEST)
- INSEE/Postal code: 88085 /88640
- ^{1} French Land Register data, which excludes lakes, ponds, glaciers > 1 km^{2} (0.386 sq mi or 247 acres) and river estuaries.

Champdray (French pronunciation: [ʃɑ̃dʁɛ]) is a commune in the Vosges department in Grand Est in northeastern France. It lies 23 km east of Épinal, the department capital.

== See also ==
- Communes of the Vosges department
