= Jussarupt =

- Commune
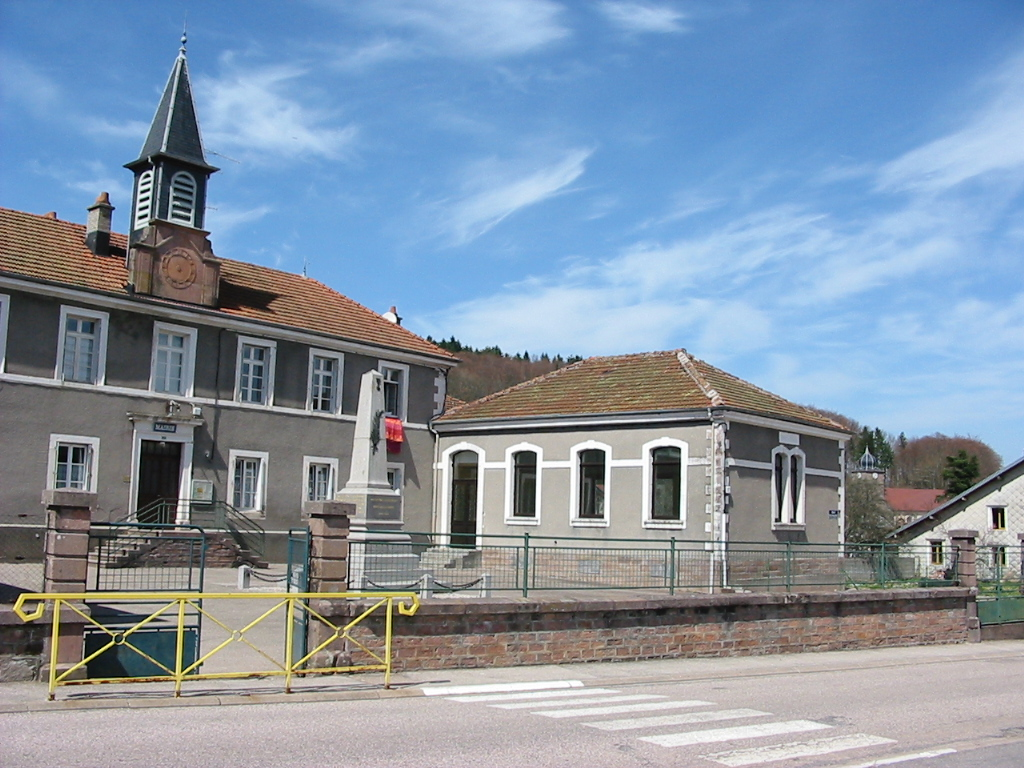
- Town hall and school
- Location of Jussarupt
- Location within France Location within Grand Est
- Coordinates: 48°09′37″N 6°45′13″E
- Country: France
- Region: Grand Est
- Department: Vosges
- Arrondissement: Saint-Dié-des-Vosges
- Canton: Bruyères
- Intercommunality: CC Bruyères - Vallons des Vosges

Government
  - Mayor (2020–2026): Marie-Bénédicte Antoine
- Area^{1}: 6.57 km^{2} (2.54 sq mi)
- Elevation: 485 m (1,591 ft)
- Highest elevation: 761 m (2,497 ft)
- Lowest elevation: 453 m (1,486 ft)
- Population (2023): 256
  - Density: 39.0/km^{2} (101/sq mi)
- Time zone: UTC+01:00 (CET)
  - Summer (DST): UTC+02:00 (CEST)
- INSEE/Postal code: 88256 /88640
- ^{1} French Land Register data, which excludes lakes, ponds, glaciers > 1 km^{2} (0.386 sq mi or 247 acres) and river estuaries.

Jussarupt (French pronunciation: [ʒysaʁy]) is a commune in the Vosges department in Grand Est in northeastern France.

== See also ==
- Communes of the Vosges department
