= Communauté de communes Bruyères - Vallons des Vosges =

Federation of municipalities in France

Bruyères - Vallons des Vosges
- Communauté de communes
- Interactive map of Bruyères - Vallons des Vosges
- Coordinates: 48°12′N 06°43′E
- Country: France
- Region: Grand Est
- Department: Vosges
- No. of communes: {{{nbcomm}}}
- Established: 2014
- Area: 220.0 km^{2} (84.9 sq mi)
- Population (2019): 15,116
  - Density: 68.71/km^{2} (178.0/sq mi)

The Communauté de communes Bruyères - Vallons des Vosges is an administrative association of rural communes in the Vosges department of eastern France. It was created on 1 January 2014 by the merger of the former Communauté de communes de l'Arentèle-Durbion-Padozel, Communauté de communes de la Vallée de la Vologne, Communauté de communes du canton de Brouvelieures and three other communes. On 1 January 2018 it lost 3 communes to the Communauté d'agglomération de Saint-Dié-des-Vosges. It consists of 34 communes, and has its administrative offices at Bruyères. Its area is 220.0 km^{2}, and its population was 15,116 in 2019.

== Composition ==
The communauté de communes consists of the following 34 communes:

1. Beauménil
2. Belmont-sur-Buttant
3. Brouvelieures
4. Bruyères
5. Champ-le-Duc
6. Charmois-devant-Bruyères
7. Cheniménil
8. Destord
9. Deycimont
10. Docelles
11. Domfaing
12. Faucompierre
13. Fays
14. Fiménil
15. Fontenay
16. Fremifontaine
17. Girecourt-sur-Durbion
18. Grandvillers
19. Gugnécourt
20. Herpelmont
21. Jussarupt
22. Laval-sur-Vologne
23. Laveline-devant-Bruyères
24. Laveline-du-Houx
25. Lépanges-sur-Vologne
26. Méménil
27. La Neuveville-devant-Lépanges
28. Nonzeville
29. Pierrepont-sur-l'Arentèle
30. Prey
31. Le Roulier
32. Vervezelle
33. Viménil
34. Xamontarupt
