= Rehaupal =

- Commune
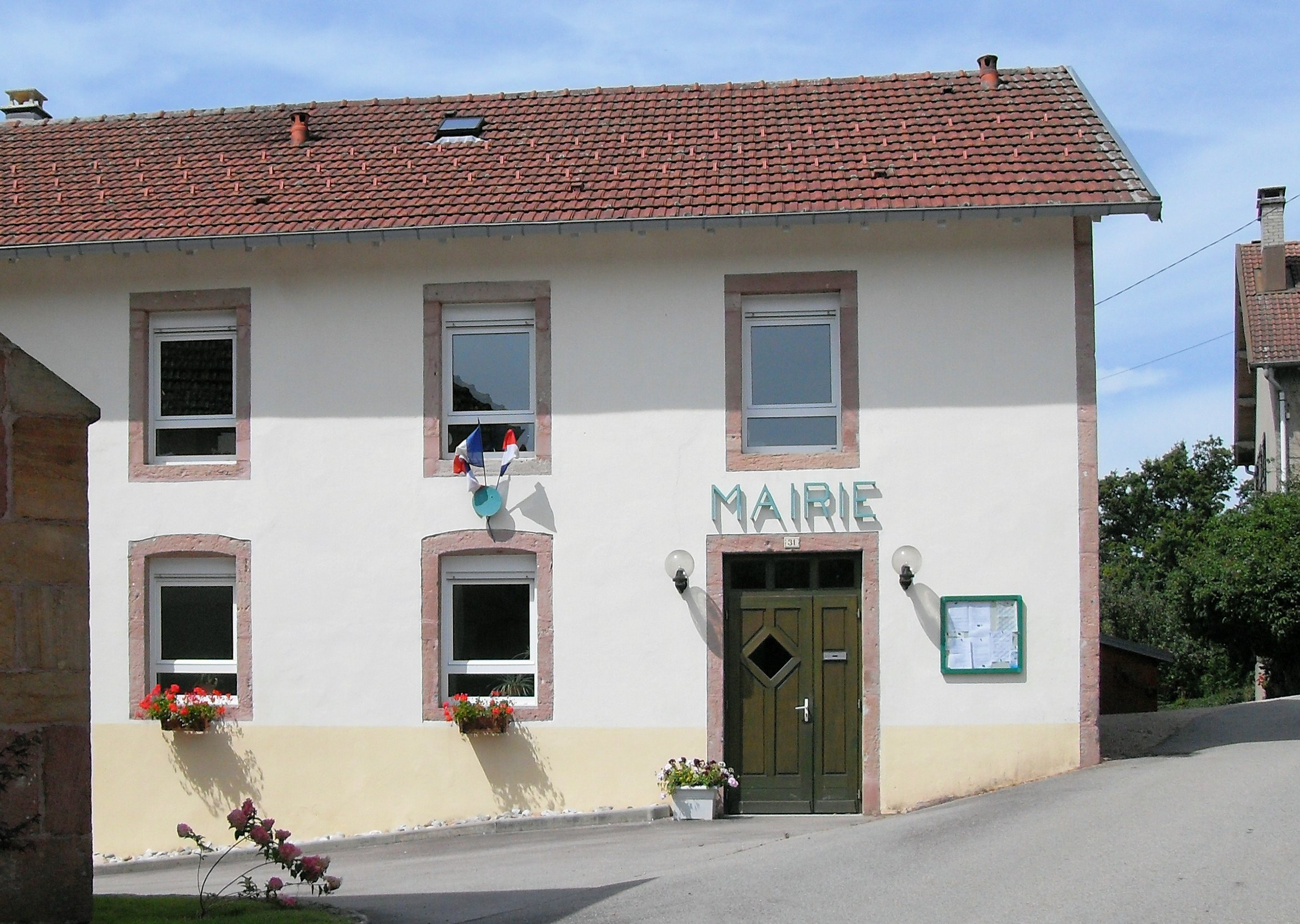
- The town hall in Rehaupal
- Location of Rehaupal
- Location within France Location within Grand Est
- Coordinates: 48°07′13″N 6°43′58″E
- Country: France
- Region: Grand Est
- Department: Vosges
- Arrondissement: Saint-Dié-des-Vosges
- Canton: Bruyères
- Intercommunality: CC Gérardmer Hautes Vosges

Government
  - Mayor (2020–2026): Éric Tisserant
- Area^{1}: 4.72 km^{2} (1.82 sq mi)
- Highest elevation: 763 m (2,503 ft)
- Lowest elevation: 474 m (1,555 ft)
- Population (2023): 210
  - Density: 44/km^{2} (120/sq mi)
- Time zone: UTC+01:00 (CET)
  - Summer (DST): UTC+02:00 (CEST)
- INSEE/Postal code: 88380 /88640
- ^{1} French Land Register data, which excludes lakes, ponds, glaciers > 1 km^{2} (0.386 sq mi or 247 acres) and river estuaries.

Rehaupal (French pronunciation: [ʁe.opal]) is a commune in the Vosges department in Grand Est in northeastern France.

== Economy ==
Throughout history, Rehaupal has relied on cheese making. But in recent years, green tourism has been making an impact.

== See also ==
- Communes of the Vosges department
