= Gugnécourt =

- Commune
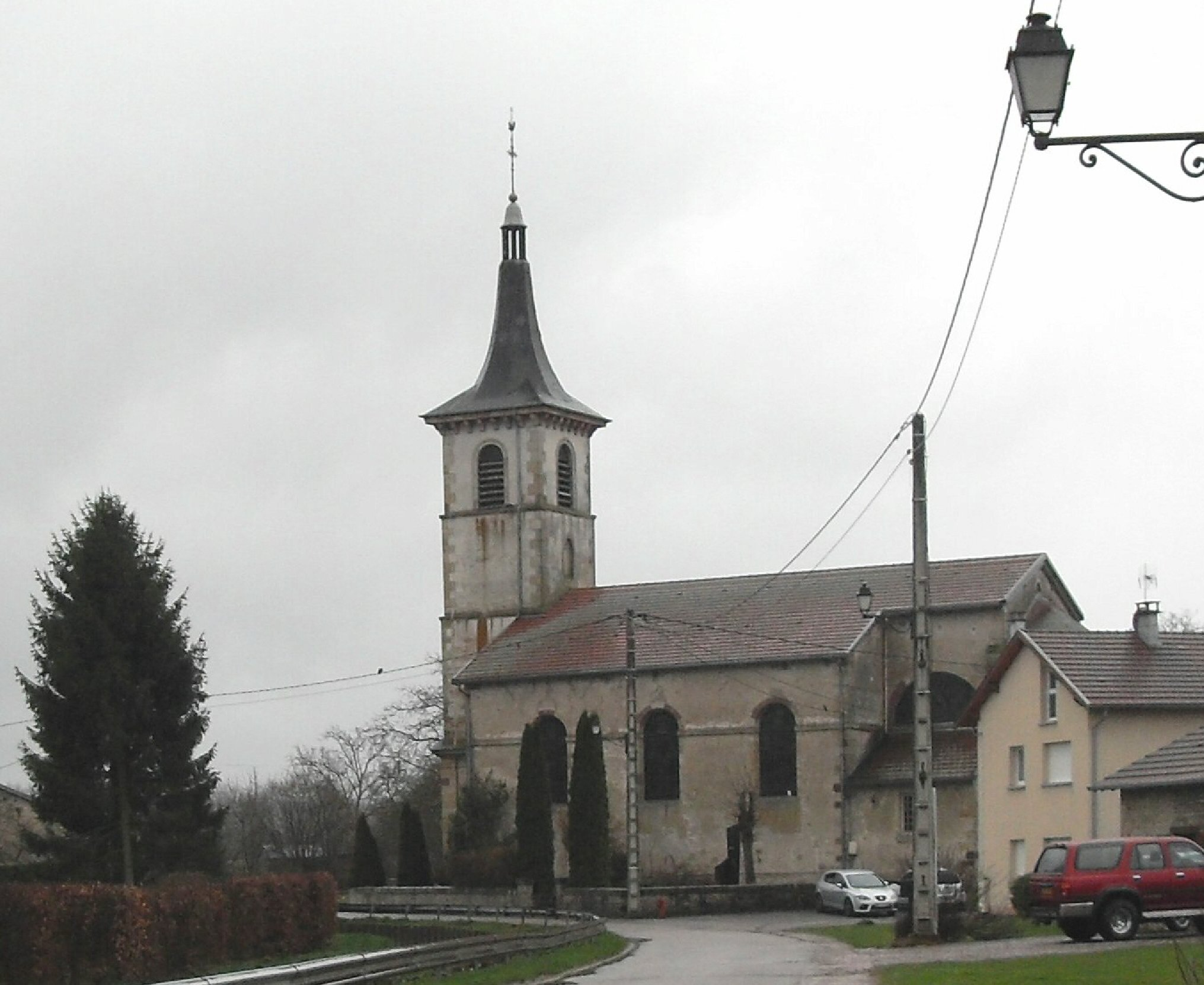
- The church in Gugnécourt

- Coat of arms
- Location of Gugnécourt
- Location within France Location within Grand Est
- Coordinates: 48°14′41″N 6°37′28″E
- Country: France
- Region: Grand Est
- Department: Vosges
- Arrondissement: Saint-Dié-des-Vosges
- Canton: Bruyères
- Intercommunality: CC Bruyères - Vallons des Vosges

Government
  - Mayor (2020–2026): Lucien Deblay
- Area^{1}: 5.11 km^{2} (1.97 sq mi)
- Elevation: 342 m (1,122 ft)
- Highest elevation: 368 m (1,207 ft)
- Lowest elevation: 335 m (1,099 ft)
- Population (2023): 223
  - Density: 43.6/km^{2} (113/sq mi)
- Time zone: UTC+01:00 (CET)
  - Summer (DST): UTC+02:00 (CEST)
- INSEE/Postal code: 88222 /88600
- ^{1} French Land Register data, which excludes lakes, ponds, glaciers > 1 km^{2} (0.386 sq mi or 247 acres) and river estuaries.

Gugnécourt (French pronunciation: [ɡyɲekuʁ]) is a commune in the Vosges department in Grand Est in northeastern France.

== See also ==
- Communes of the Vosges department
