= Fays, Vosges =

Fays
- Commune
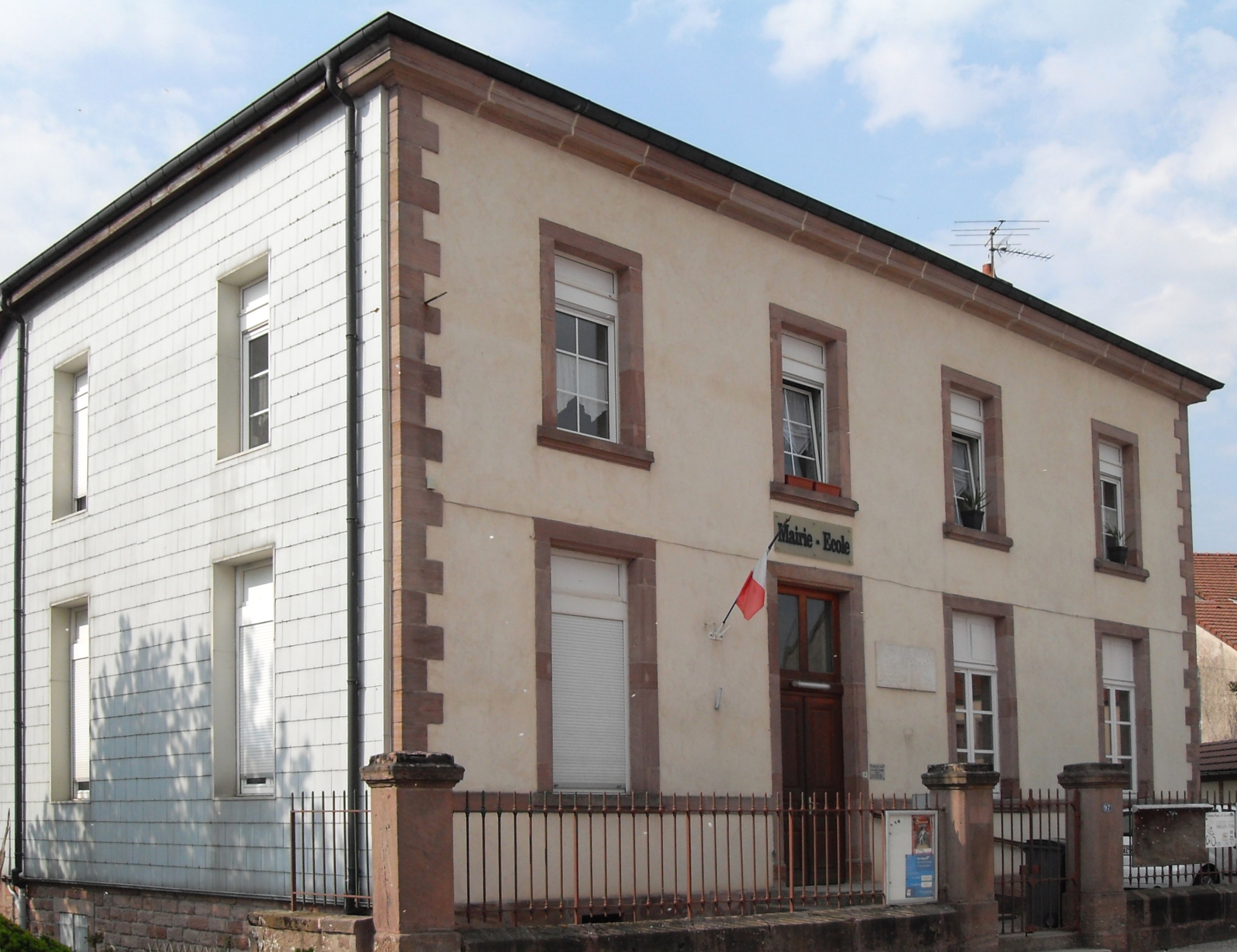
- The town hall and school in Fays
- Location of Fays
- Location within France Location within Grand Est
- Coordinates: 48°11′43″N 6°40′33″E
- Country: France
- Region: Grand Est
- Department: Vosges
- Arrondissement: Saint-Dié-des-Vosges
- Canton: Bruyères
- Intercommunality: CC Bruyères - Vallons des Vosges

Government
  - Mayor (2020–2026): Anne-Marie Huertas
- Area^{1}: 4.83 km^{2} (1.86 sq mi)
- Highest elevation: 610 m (2,000 ft)
- Lowest elevation: 417 m (1,368 ft)
- Population (2023): 222
  - Density: 46.0/km^{2} (119/sq mi)
- Time zone: UTC+01:00 (CET)
  - Summer (DST): UTC+02:00 (CEST)
- INSEE/Postal code: 88169 /88600
- ^{1} French Land Register data, which excludes lakes, ponds, glaciers > 1 km^{2} (0.386 sq mi or 247 acres) and river estuaries.

Fays is a commune in the Vosges department in Grand Est in northeastern France.

== See also ==
- Communes of the Vosges department
