= Le Roulier =

- Commune
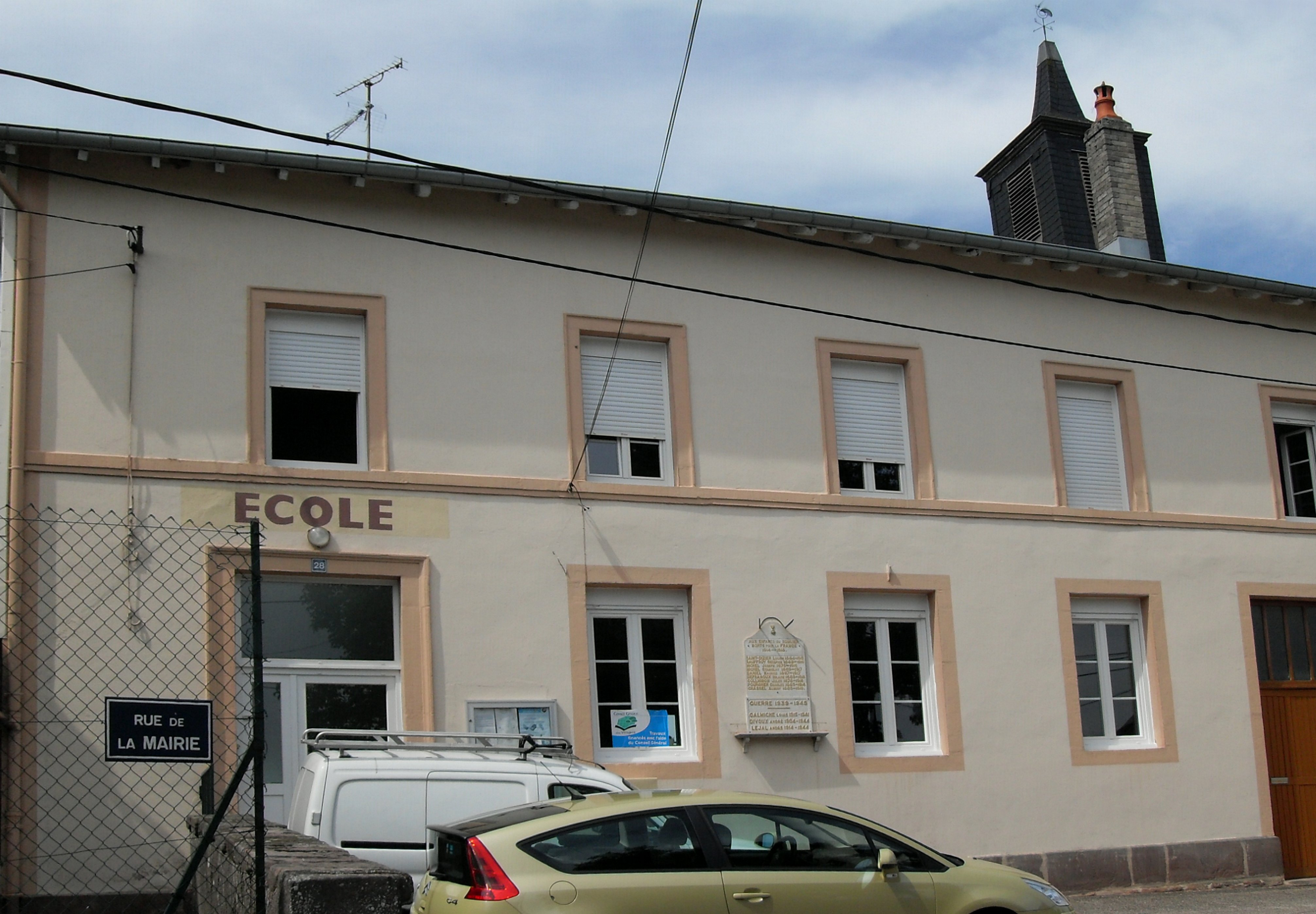
- The town hall and school in Le Roulier
- Location of Le Roulier
- Location within France Location within Grand Est
- Coordinates: 48°10′07″N 6°37′14″E
- Country: France
- Region: Grand Est
- Department: Vosges
- Arrondissement: Saint-Dié-des-Vosges
- Canton: Bruyères
- Intercommunality: CC Bruyères - Vallons des Vosges

Government
  - Mayor (2022–2026): Marie-Rose Jacques
- Area^{1}: 5.67 km^{2} (2.19 sq mi)
- Highest elevation: 560 m (1,840 ft)
- Lowest elevation: 393 m (1,289 ft)
- Population (2023): 208
  - Density: 36.7/km^{2} (95.0/sq mi)
- Time zone: UTC+01:00 (CET)
  - Summer (DST): UTC+02:00 (CEST)
- INSEE/Postal code: 88399 /88460
- ^{1} French Land Register data, which excludes lakes, ponds, glaciers > 1 km^{2} (0.386 sq mi or 247 acres) and river estuaries.

Le Roulier (French pronunciation: [lə ʁulje]) is a commune in the Vosges department in Grand Est in northeastern France.

== See also ==
- Communes of the Vosges department
