= Laval-sur-Vologne =

- Commune
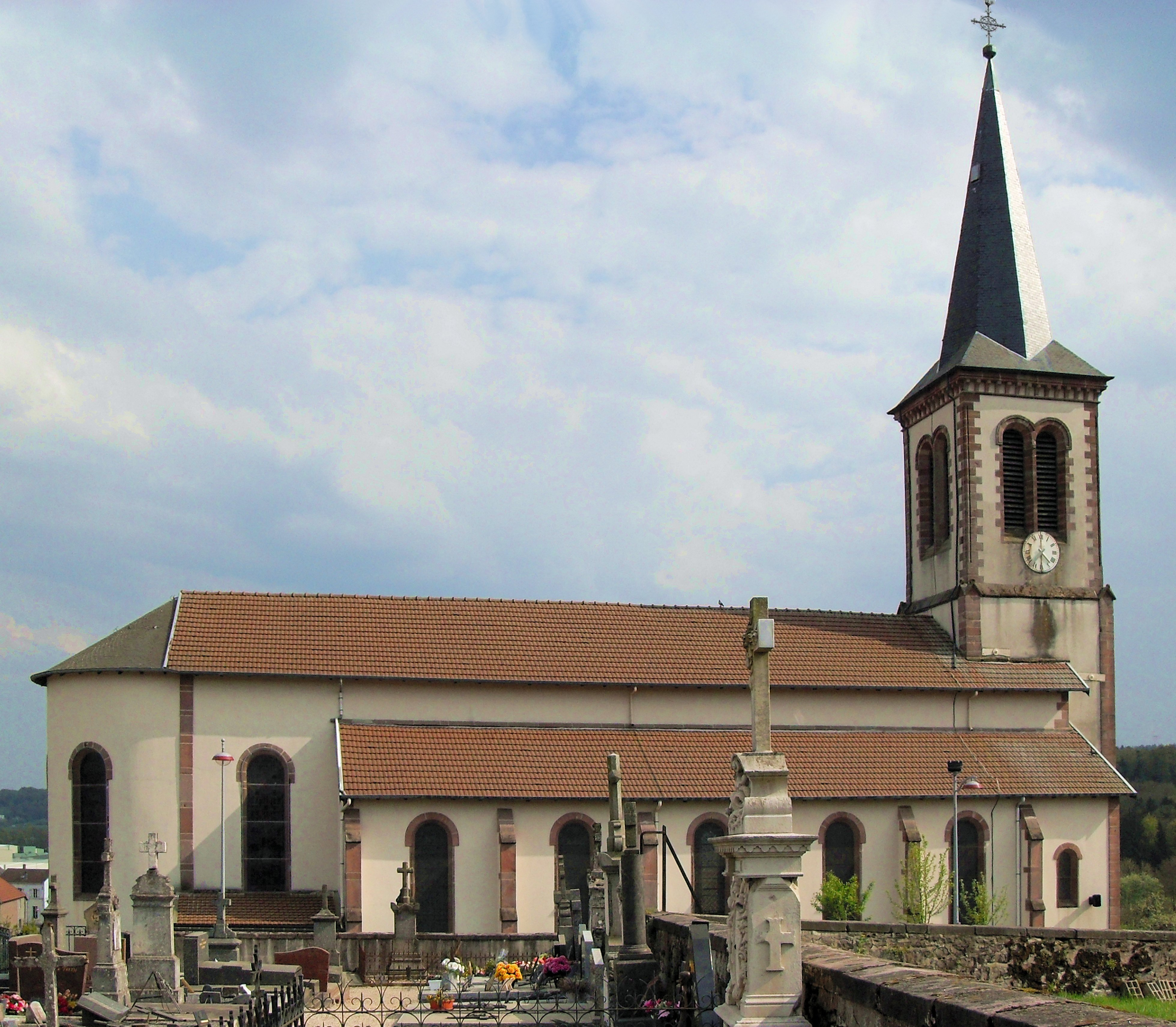
- The church in Laval-sur-Vologne
- Location of Laval-sur-Vologne
- Location within France Location within Grand Est
- Coordinates: 48°11′43″N 6°42′04″E
- Country: France
- Region: Grand Est
- Department: Vosges
- Arrondissement: Saint-Dié-des-Vosges
- Canton: Bruyères
- Intercommunality: CC Bruyères - Vallons des Vosges

Government
  - Mayor (2021–2026): Stéphane Pauchard
- Area^{1}: 3.58 km^{2} (1.38 sq mi)
- Highest elevation: 500 m (1,600 ft)
- Lowest elevation: 409 m (1,342 ft)
- Population (2023): 628
  - Density: 175/km^{2} (454/sq mi)
- Time zone: UTC+01:00 (CET)
  - Summer (DST): UTC+02:00 (CEST)
- INSEE/Postal code: 88261 /88600
- ^{1} French Land Register data, which excludes lakes, ponds, glaciers > 1 km^{2} (0.386 sq mi or 247 acres) and river estuaries.

Laval-sur-Vologne (French pronunciation: [laval syʁ vɔlɔɲ], literally Laval on Vologne) is a commune in the Vosges department in Grand Est in northeastern France.

== See also ==
- Communes of the Vosges department
