= Pierrepont-sur-l'Arentèle =

- Commune
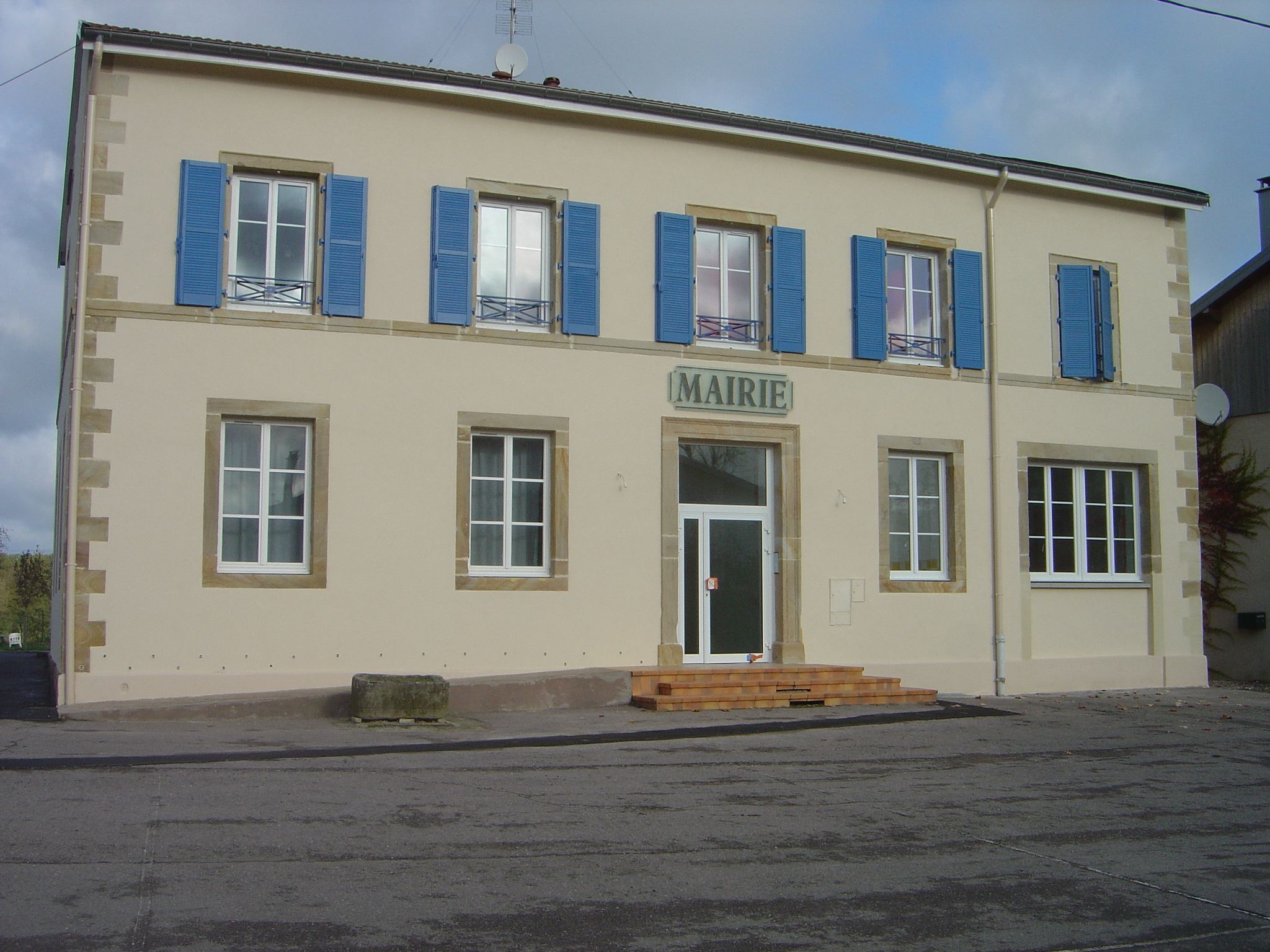
- The town hall in Pierrepont-sur-l'Arentèle
- Location of Pierrepont-sur-l'Arentèle
- Location within France Location within Grand Est
- Coordinates: 48°15′51″N 6°38′58″E
- Country: France
- Region: Grand Est
- Department: Vosges
- Arrondissement: Saint-Dié-des-Vosges
- Canton: Bruyères
- Intercommunality: CC Bruyères - Vallons des Vosges

Government
  - Mayor (2020–2026): Claude Husson
- Area^{1}: 6.23 km^{2} (2.41 sq mi)
- Elevation: 340 m (1,120 ft)
- Highest elevation: 380 m (1,250 ft)
- Lowest elevation: 322 m (1,056 ft)
- Population (2023): 146
  - Density: 23.4/km^{2} (60.7/sq mi)
- Time zone: UTC+01:00 (CET)
  - Summer (DST): UTC+02:00 (CEST)
- INSEE/Postal code: 88348 /88600
- ^{1} French Land Register data, which excludes lakes, ponds, glaciers > 1 km^{2} (0.386 sq mi or 247 acres) and river estuaries.

Pierrepont-sur-l'Arentèle (French pronunciation: [pjɛʁpɔ̃ syʁ laʁɑ̃tɛl]) is a commune in the Vosges department in Grand Est in northeastern France.

Inhabitants are called Pierrepontais in French.

== Geography ==
The village is positioned on a minor road in the wooded countryside between Épinal and Saint-Dié. As the name indicates, the commune is crossed by the river Arentèle, which rises at the foot of the Avison Massif in the commune of Bruyères, some 12 kilometres (7 mi) through the forest to the southeast.

== History ==
In the 7th century C.E., Saint Dié turned up on the banks of the Arentèle and started to build a monastery. The territory was already inhabited, however; the villagers greeted the new arrivals with hostility, chasing them away in an easterly direction towards present-day Saint-Dié-des-Vosges, where the itinerant saint and his retinue founded that town.

== See also ==
- Communes of the Vosges department
