= Grandvillers =

- Commune
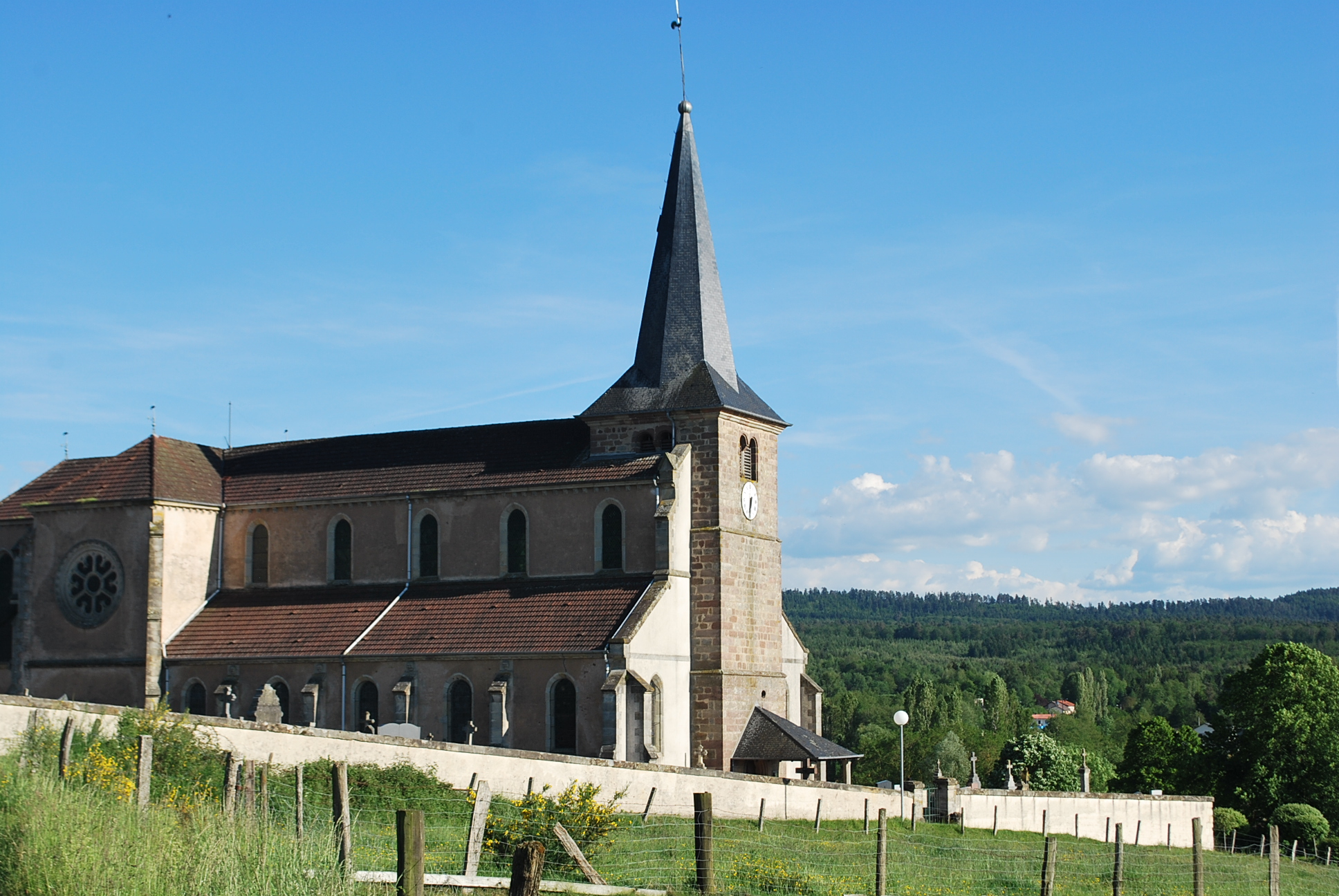
- Church of Grandvillers
- Location of Grandvillers
- Location within France Location within Grand Est
- Coordinates: 48°14′24″N 6°39′41″E
- Country: France
- Region: Grand Est
- Department: Vosges
- Arrondissement: Saint-Dié-des-Vosges
- Canton: Bruyères
- Intercommunality: CC Bruyères - Vallons des Vosges

Government
  - Mayor (2020–2026): Charles Schlachter
- Area^{1}: 17.46 km^{2} (6.74 sq mi)
- Elevation: 364 m (1,194 ft)
- Highest elevation: 522 m (1,713 ft)
- Lowest elevation: 334 m (1,096 ft)
- Population (2023): 716
  - Density: 41.0/km^{2} (106/sq mi)
- Time zone: UTC+01:00 (CET)
  - Summer (DST): UTC+02:00 (CEST)
- INSEE/Postal code: 88216 /88600
- ^{1} French Land Register data, which excludes lakes, ponds, glaciers > 1 km^{2} (0.386 sq mi or 247 acres) and river estuaries.

Grandvillers is a commune in the Vosges department of the Grand Est region in Northeastern France. As of 2023, the population of the commune was 716.

== See also ==
- Communes of the Vosges department
