= Champ-le-Duc =

- Commune
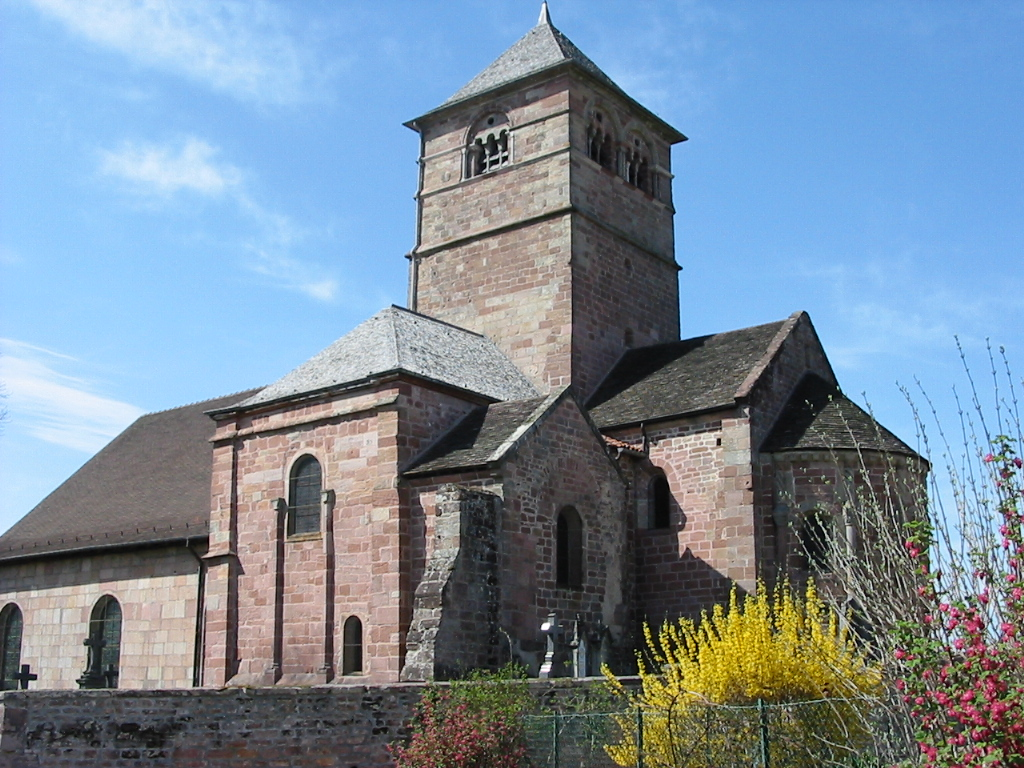
- The church in Champ-le-Duc
- Location of Champ-le-Duc
- Location within France Location within Grand Est
- Coordinates: 48°11′41″N 6°43′13″E
- Country: France
- Region: Grand Est
- Department: Vosges
- Arrondissement: Saint-Dié-des-Vosges
- Canton: Bruyères
- Intercommunality: CC Bruyères - Vallons des Vosges

Government
  - Mayor (2020–2026): Jean-Louis Mentrel
- Area^{1}: 3.92 km^{2} (1.51 sq mi)
- Highest elevation: 514 m (1,686 ft)
- Lowest elevation: 421 m (1,381 ft)
- Population (2023): 475
  - Density: 121/km^{2} (314/sq mi)
- Time zone: UTC+01:00 (CET)
  - Summer (DST): UTC+02:00 (CEST)
- INSEE/Postal code: 88086 /88600
- ^{1} French Land Register data, which excludes lakes, ponds, glaciers > 1 km^{2} (0.386 sq mi or 247 acres) and river estuaries.

Champ-le-Duc (French pronunciation: [ʃɑ̃ lə dyk]) is a commune in the Vosges department in Grand Est in northeastern France.

== See also ==
- Communes of the Vosges department
