= Laveline-du-Houx =

- Commune
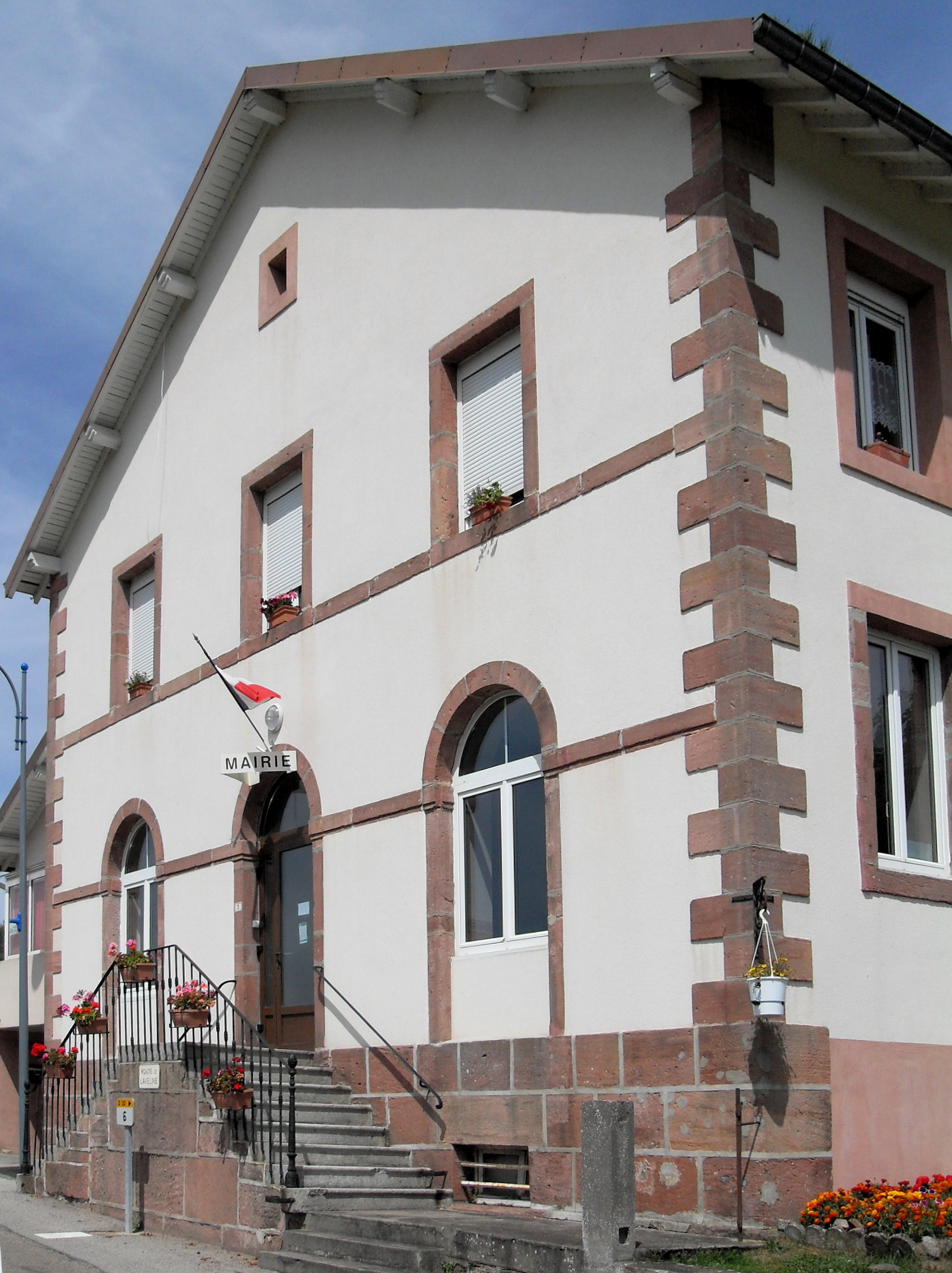
- The town hall in Laveline-du-Houx

- Coat of arms
- Location of Laveline-du-Houx
- Location within France Location within Grand Est
- Coordinates: 48°08′09″N 6°42′20″E
- Country: France
- Region: Grand Est
- Department: Vosges
- Arrondissement: Saint-Dié-des-Vosges
- Canton: Bruyères
- Intercommunality: CC Bruyères - Vallons des Vosges

Government
  - Mayor (2020–2026): Pascal Parmentelat
- Area^{1}: 8.21 km^{2} (3.17 sq mi)
- Highest elevation: 710 m (2,330 ft)
- Lowest elevation: 444 m (1,457 ft)
- Population (2023): 213
  - Density: 25.9/km^{2} (67.2/sq mi)
- Time zone: UTC+01:00 (CET)
  - Summer (DST): UTC+02:00 (CEST)
- INSEE/Postal code: 88263 /88640
- ^{1} French Land Register data, which excludes lakes, ponds, glaciers > 1 km^{2} (0.386 sq mi or 247 acres) and river estuaries.

Laveline-du-Houx (French pronunciation: [lavlin dy u]) is a commune in the Vosges department in Grand Est in northeastern France.

== See also ==
- Communes of the Vosges department
