= Xamontarupt =

- Commune
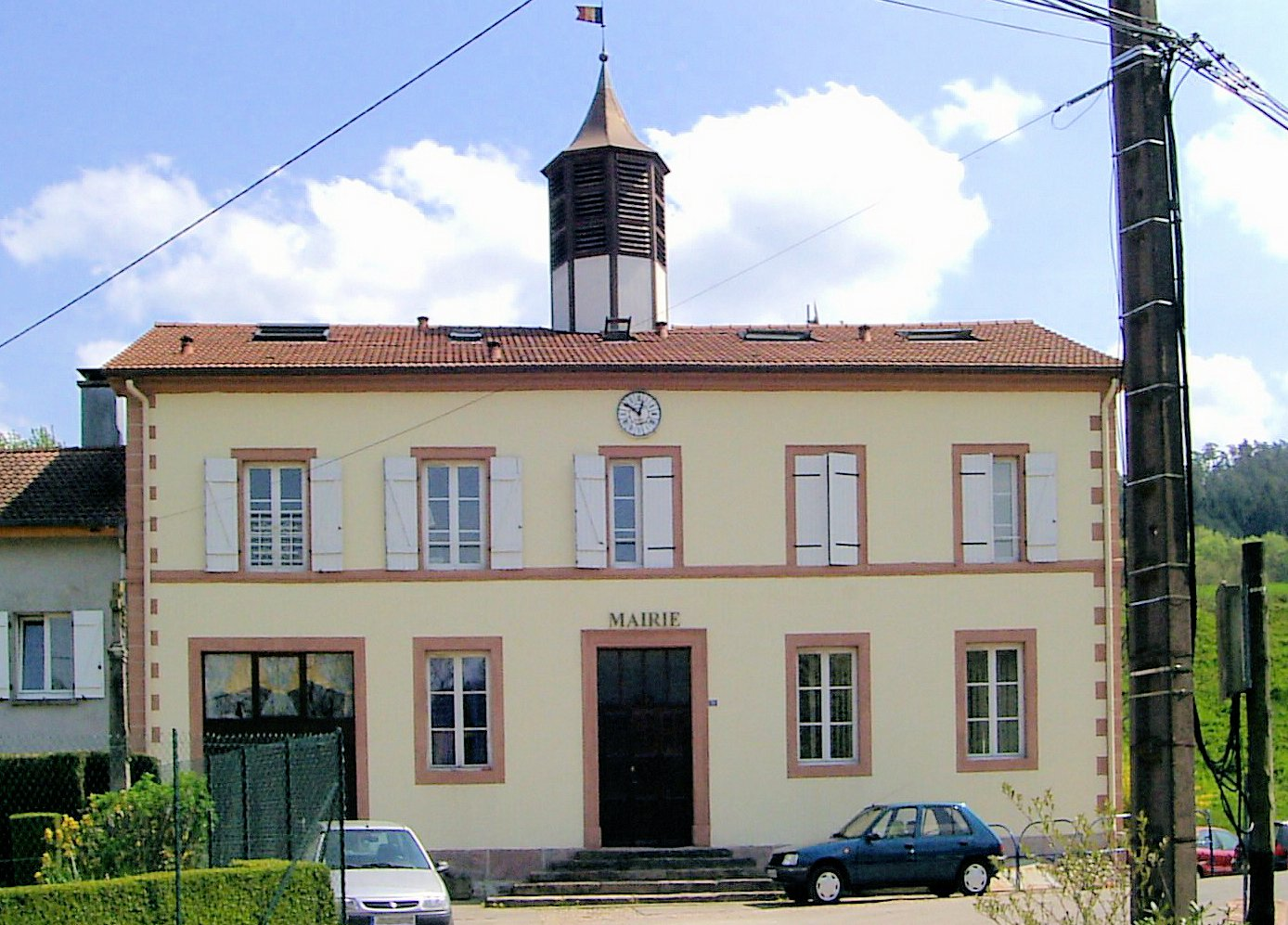
- Town hall
- Location of Xamontarupt
- Location within France Location within Grand Est
- Coordinates: 48°08′00″N 6°39′14″E
- Country: France
- Region: Grand Est
- Department: Vosges
- Arrondissement: Saint-Dié-des-Vosges
- Canton: Bruyères
- Intercommunality: Bruyères-Vallons des Vosges

Government
  - Mayor (2020–2026): Emmanuel Parisse
- Area^{1}: 5 km^{2} (1.9 sq mi)
- Highest elevation: 671 m (2,201 ft)
- Lowest elevation: 393 m (1,289 ft)
- Population (2023): 152
  - Density: 30/km^{2} (79/sq mi)
- Time zone: UTC+01:00 (CET)
  - Summer (DST): UTC+02:00 (CEST)
- INSEE/Postal code: 88528 /88460
- ^{1} French Land Register data, which excludes lakes, ponds, glaciers > 1 km^{2} (0.386 sq mi or 247 acres) and river estuaries.

Xamontarupt (French pronunciation: [ʃamɔ̃taʁy]) is a commune in the Vosges department in Grand Est in northeastern France.

== Geography ==
Abutting the heavily wooded massif of le Fossard, the village is crossed by the Cuves stream, an outflow of the Vologne river.

== History ==
Evidence of protohistoric human presence: construction from set stones, flakes of cut quartz. 400-year old holly in the village, probably some of the oldest in Europe, can be seen on the route leading to the Haut-du-Bois maquis.

In 1656, the village was called "Charmontaruz".

== Population ==
Its inhabitants are known as Rupéains or Xamontois in French.

Historical population
Year	Pop.	±% p.a.
1968	108	—
1975	95	−1.82%
1982	82	−2.08%
1990	140	+6.92%
1999	138	−0.16%
2007	152	+1.22%
2012	149	−0.40%
2017	155	+0.79%
2023	152	−0.33%
Source: INSEE

== Personalities ==
- Jean-René Claudel, amateur speleologist and archeologist, discovered the flakes of quartzite.

== See also ==
- Communes of the Vosges department
