= Beauménil =

- Commune
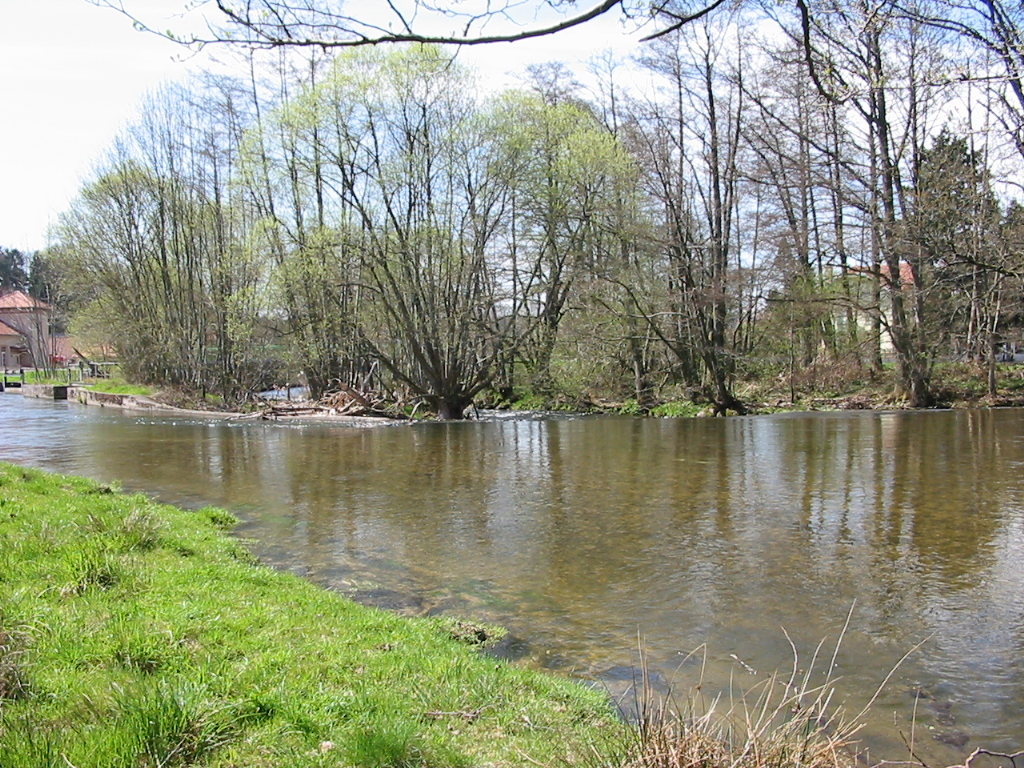
- The Vologne
- Location of Beauménil
- Location within France Location within Grand Est
- Coordinates: 48°10′52″N 6°43′44″E
- Country: France
- Region: Grand Est
- Department: Vosges
- Arrondissement: Saint-Dié-des-Vosges
- Canton: Bruyères
- Intercommunality: CC Bruyères - Vallons des Vosges

Government
  - Mayor (2020–2026): Odile Seuret
- Area^{1}: 3.30 km^{2} (1.27 sq mi)
- Highest elevation: 686 m (2,251 ft)
- Lowest elevation: 429 m (1,407 ft)
- Population (2023): 131
  - Density: 39.7/km^{2} (103/sq mi)
- Time zone: UTC+01:00 (CET)
  - Summer (DST): UTC+02:00 (CEST)
- INSEE/Postal code: 88046 /88600
- ^{1} French Land Register data, which excludes lakes, ponds, glaciers > 1 km^{2} (0.386 sq mi or 247 acres) and river estuaries.

Beauménil (French pronunciation: [bomenil]) is a commune in the Vosges department in Grand Est in northeastern France.

== See also ==
- Communes of the Vosges department
