= Fontenay, Vosges =

Fontenay
- Commune
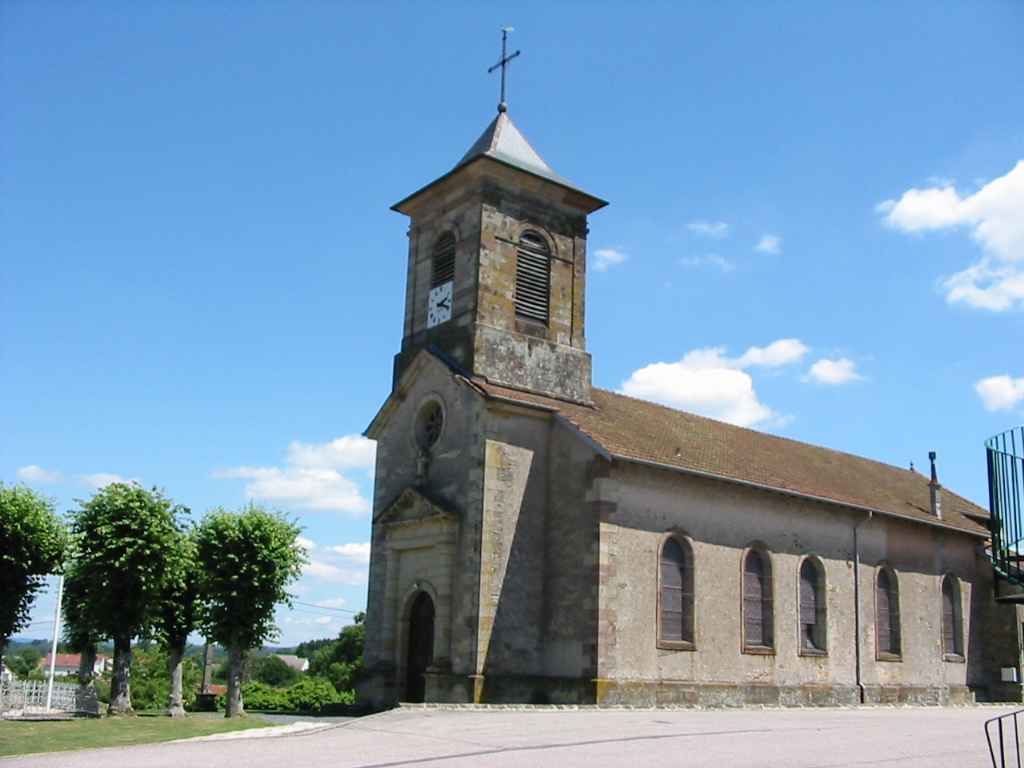
- The church in Fontenay

- Coat of arms
- Location of Fontenay
- Location within France Location within Grand Est
- Coordinates: 48°13′08″N 6°35′22″E
- Country: France
- Region: Grand Est
- Department: Vosges
- Arrondissement: Saint-Dié-des-Vosges
- Canton: Bruyères
- Intercommunality: CC Bruyères - Vallons des Vosges

Government
  - Mayor (2020–2026): Jérôme Poifoulot
- Area^{1}: 6.47 km^{2} (2.50 sq mi)
- Elevation: 375 m (1,230 ft)
- Highest elevation: 492 m (1,614 ft)
- Lowest elevation: 328 m (1,076 ft)
- Population (2023): 469
  - Density: 72.5/km^{2} (188/sq mi)
- Time zone: UTC+01:00 (CET)
  - Summer (DST): UTC+02:00 (CEST)
- INSEE/Postal code: 88175 /88600
- ^{1} French Land Register data, which excludes lakes, ponds, glaciers > 1 km^{2} (0.386 sq mi or 247 acres) and river estuaries.

Fontenay (French pronunciation: [fɔ̃tnɛ]) is a commune in the Vosges department in Grand Est in northeastern France. The inhabitants of Fontenay are called the Fontenaysians.

== History ==
Fontenay is a village of fountains, hence the name "Fontenay". There are more than twenty outdoor fountains in operation and numerous indoor wells in the village which are fed from springs in the forest.

== Economy ==
The village counts numerous small enterprises with economic activities including:

- Agriculture
- Air conditioning and heating systems
- Auberge
- Bakery, Pastry shop, Grocery outlet
- Bar & Wine cellar
- Carpentry
- Dog care
- Energy studies for buildings
- Hairdresser
- Insurance agency
- Interior decoration
- Masonry and Construction
- Real Estate Agent
- Magnetic healer

== Mayor and Town Council and Community Committees ==
- Mayor: Krista Finstad-Milion

Deputy Mayors and Town Councillors:

- First Deputy Mayor: Jacques Siméon
- Second Deputy Mayor: Roger Guiguemdé
- Third Deputy Mayor: Olivier Perdreau

Town Councillors:

- Jean-François Bonnard, Luc Boutry (Security, Presybtère management, collective heating system), Martine Chachay (cemetery management, stray animals, sustainable flower beds), Martine Chrisment (Elderly care), Julien Chrisment (Forestry and wood cutting), Carine Christophe, Adelaïde Crouvisier, Anne-Marie Lasausse (Treasury), François Poirot (Garden management)

== Intercommunality ==
Fontenay belongs to the Bruyères-Vallons des Vosges intercommunality.

== Demography ==
In 2016 the population of the village was 519.

== Associations ==
The village counts several associations. The "Jeanne d'Arc (Joan of Arc) Association" which promotes organ playing on one of the numerous organs belonging to the association, summer sessions, and organ concerts. There is also an informal group of vintage Solex (motorcycle) owners, youth and adults, who regularly organise outings.

== See also ==
- Communes of the Vosges department
