= Viménil =

- Commune
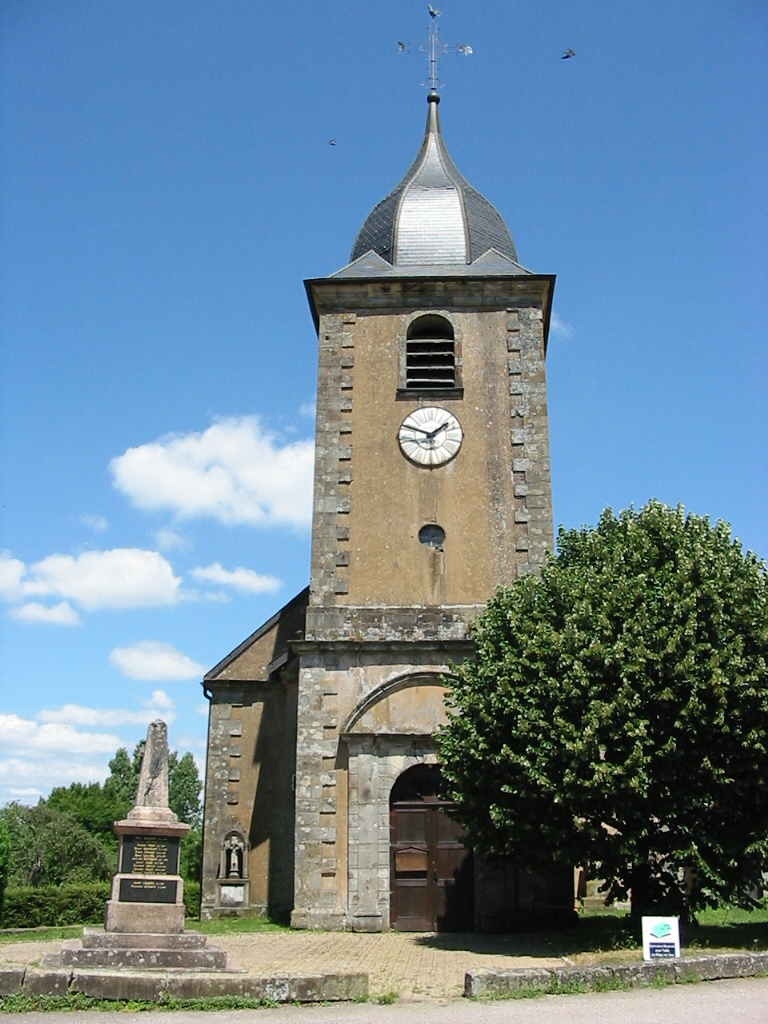
- The church in Viménil
- Location of Viménil
- Location within France Location within Grand Est
- Coordinates: 48°13′38″N 6°38′00″E
- Country: France
- Region: Grand Est
- Department: Vosges
- Arrondissement: Saint-Dié-des-Vosges
- Canton: Bruyères
- Intercommunality: CC Bruyères - Vallons des Vosges

Government
  - Mayor (2020–2026): Nadine Mérey
- Area^{1}: 8.05 km^{2} (3.11 sq mi)
- Elevation: 380 m (1,250 ft)
- Highest elevation: 563 m (1,847 ft)
- Lowest elevation: 349 m (1,145 ft)
- Population (2023): 233
  - Density: 28.9/km^{2} (75.0/sq mi)
- Time zone: UTC+01:00 (CET)
  - Summer (DST): UTC+02:00 (CEST)
- INSEE/Postal code: 88512 /88600
- ^{1} French Land Register data, which excludes lakes, ponds, glaciers > 1 km^{2} (0.386 sq mi or 247 acres) and river estuaries.

Viménil (French pronunciation: [vimenil]) is a commune in the Vosges department in Grand Est in northeastern France.

== See also ==
- Communes of the Vosges department
