= Destord =

- Commune
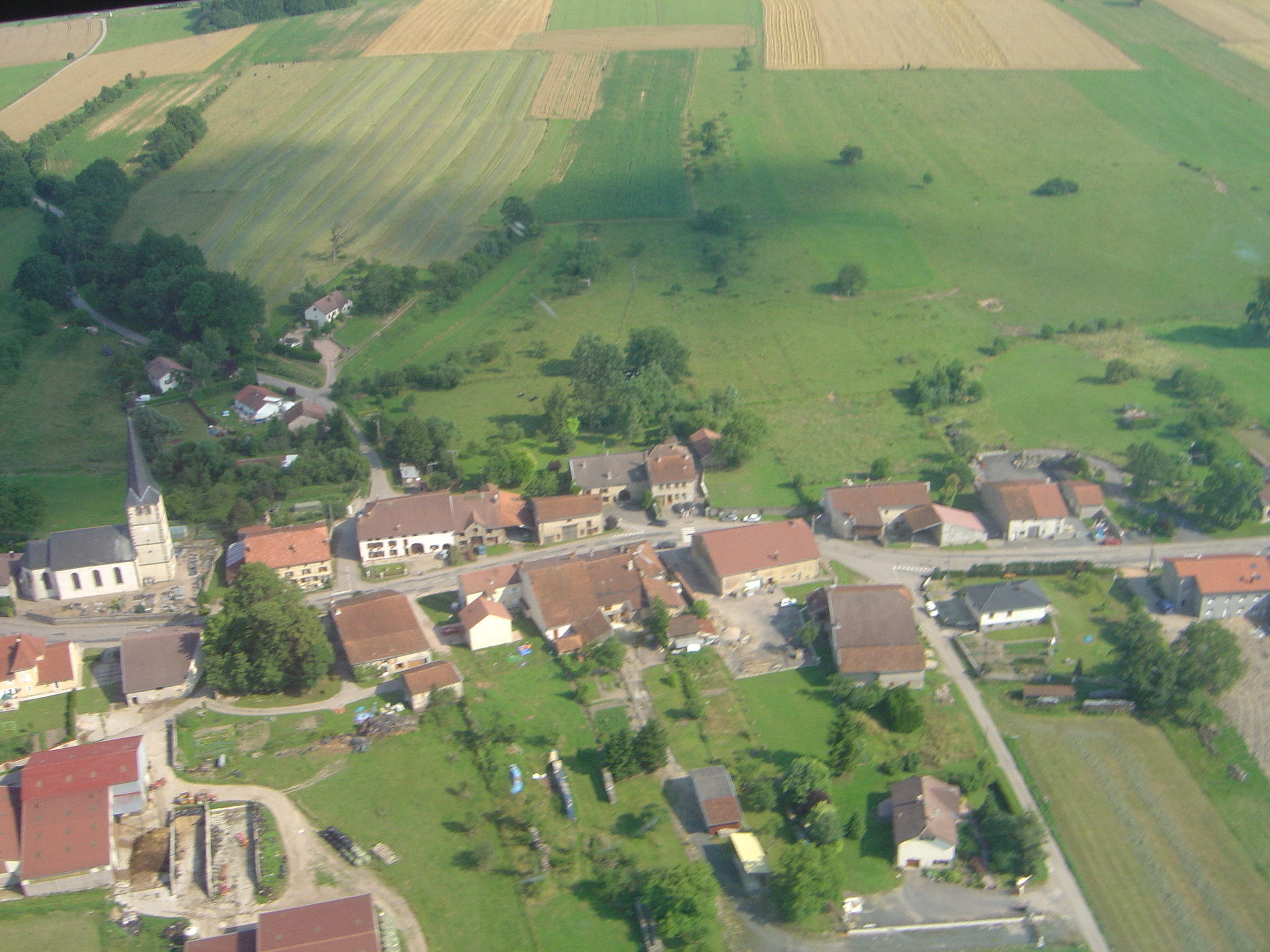
- A general view of Destord

- Coat of arms
- Location of Destord
- Location within France Location within Grand Est
- Coordinates: 48°16′25″N 6°37′19″E
- Country: France
- Region: Grand Est
- Department: Vosges
- Arrondissement: Saint-Dié-des-Vosges
- Canton: Bruyères
- Intercommunality: CC Bruyères - Vallons des Vosges

Government
  - Mayor (2020–2026): Michel Houot
- Area^{1}: 5.04 km^{2} (1.95 sq mi)
- Elevation: 350 m (1,150 ft)
- Highest elevation: 364 m (1,194 ft)
- Lowest elevation: 311 m (1,020 ft)
- Population (2023): 234
  - Density: 46.4/km^{2} (120/sq mi)
- Time zone: UTC+01:00 (CET)
  - Summer (DST): UTC+02:00 (CEST)
- INSEE/Postal code: 88130 /88600
- ^{1} French Land Register data, which excludes lakes, ponds, glaciers > 1 km^{2} (0.386 sq mi or 247 acres) and river estuaries.

Destord (French pronunciation: [detɔʁ]) is a commune in the Vosges department in Grand Est in northeastern France.

== See also ==
- Communes of the Vosges department
