= Docelles =

- Commune
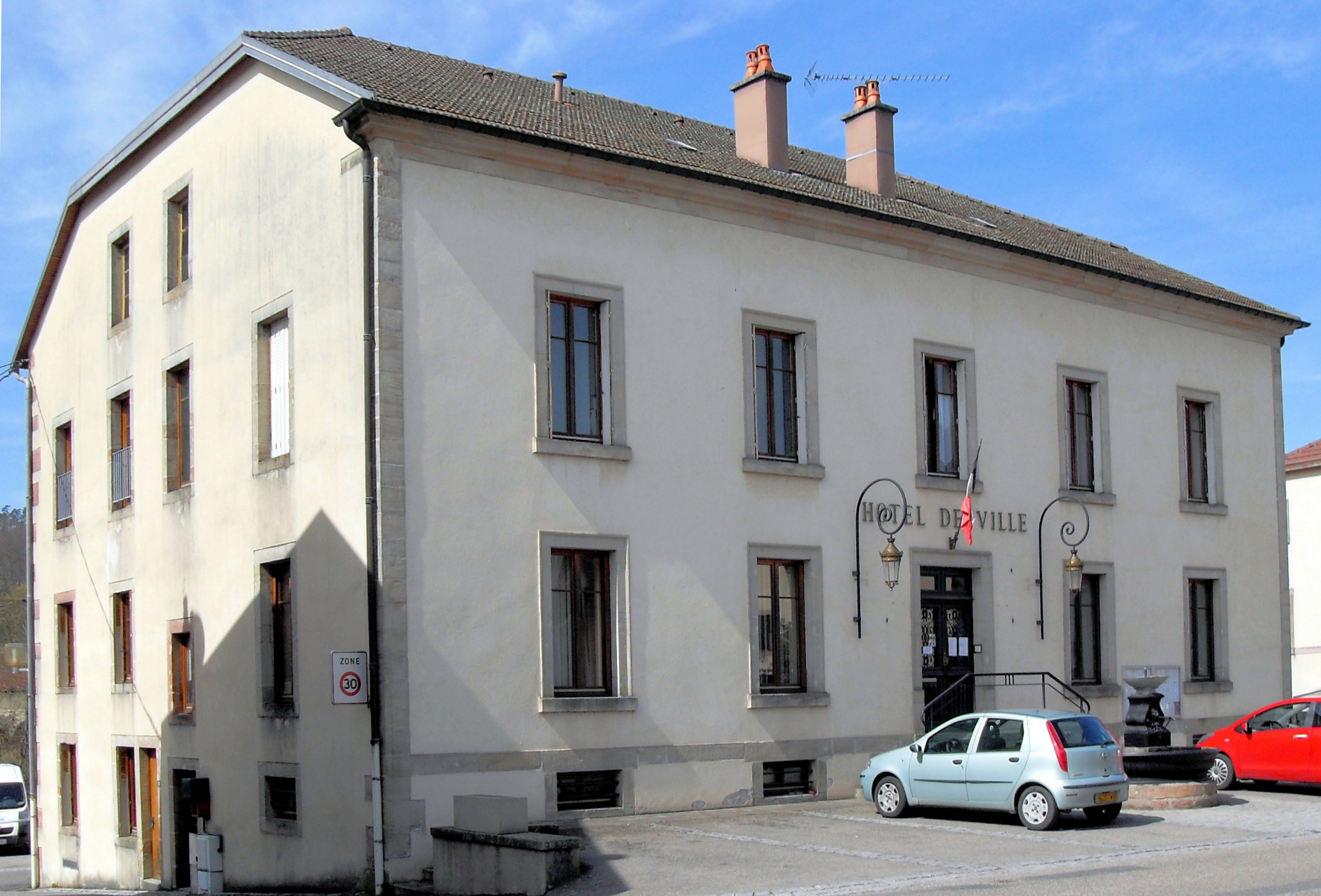
- The town hall in Docelles

- Coat of arms
- Location of Docelles
- Location within France Location within Grand Est
- Coordinates: 48°08′47″N 6°37′07″E
- Country: France
- Region: Grand Est
- Department: Vosges
- Arrondissement: Saint-Dié-des-Vosges
- Canton: Bruyères
- Intercommunality: CC Bruyères - Vallons des Vosges

Government
  - Mayor (2020–2026): Alain Woirgny
- Area^{1}: 8.74 km^{2} (3.37 sq mi)
- Highest elevation: 630 m (2,070 ft)
- Lowest elevation: 373 m (1,224 ft)
- Population (2023): 856
  - Density: 97.9/km^{2} (254/sq mi)
- Time zone: UTC+01:00 (CET)
  - Summer (DST): UTC+02:00 (CEST)
- INSEE/Postal code: 88135 /88460
- ^{1} French Land Register data, which excludes lakes, ponds, glaciers > 1 km^{2} (0.386 sq mi or 247 acres) and river estuaries.

Docelles (French pronunciation: [dɔsɛl]) is a commune in the Vosges department in Grand Est in northeastern France.

== See also ==
- Communes of the Vosges department
