= Lépanges-sur-Vologne =

- Commune
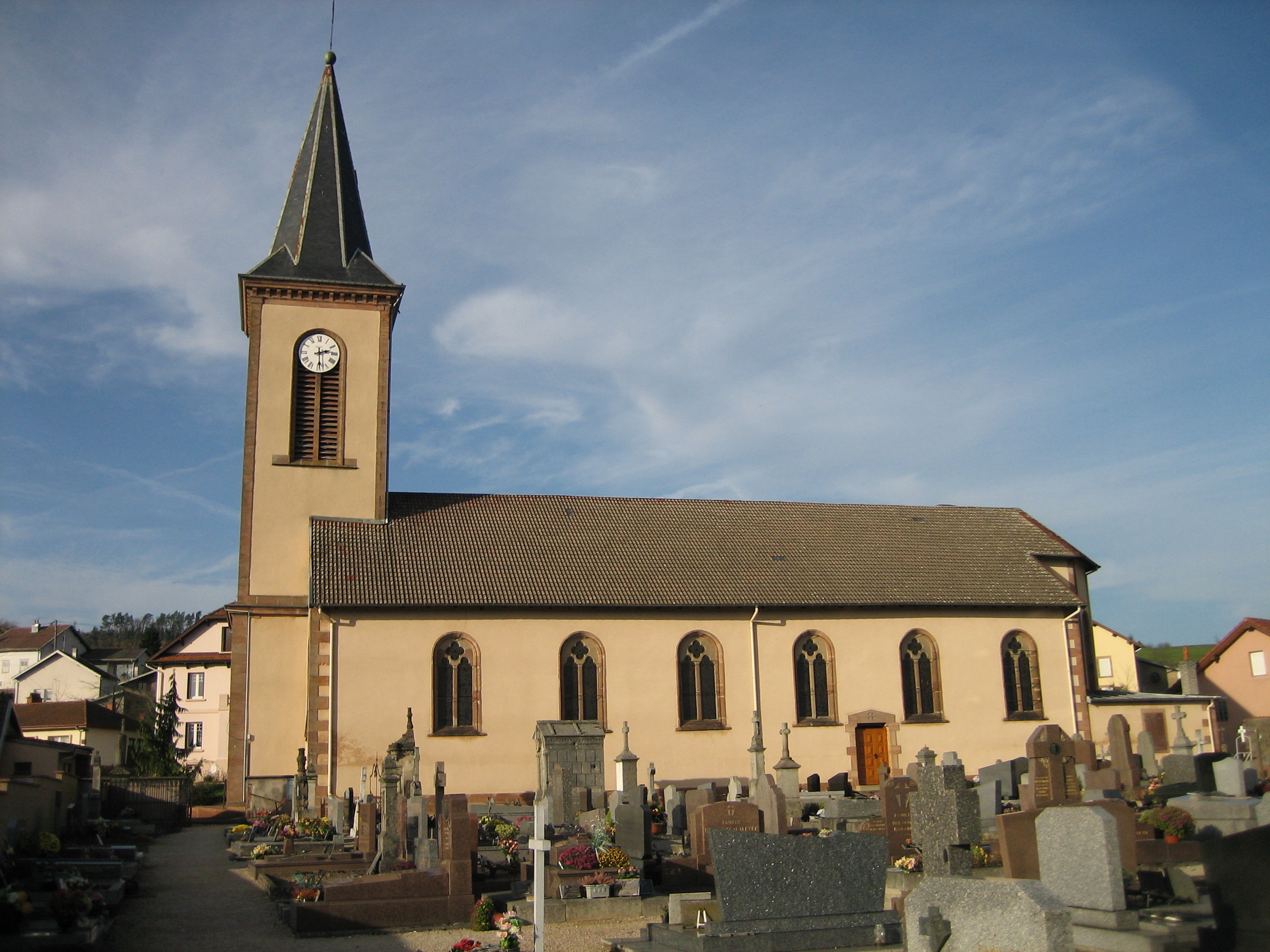
- Church of Sainte-Libaire

- Coat of arms
- Location of Lépanges-sur-Vologne
- Location within France Location within Grand Est
- Coordinates: 48°10′23″N 6°40′19″E
- Country: France
- Region: Grand Est
- Department: Vosges
- Arrondissement: Saint-Dié-des-Vosges
- Canton: Bruyères
- Intercommunality: CC Bruyères - Vallons des Vosges

Government
  - Mayor (2020–2026): Virginie Gremillet
- Area^{1}: 7.57 km^{2} (2.92 sq mi)
- Highest elevation: 667 m (2,188 ft)
- Lowest elevation: 394 m (1,293 ft)
- Population (2023): 844
  - Density: 111/km^{2} (289/sq mi)
- Time zone: UTC+01:00 (CET)
  - Summer (DST): UTC+02:00 (CEST)
- INSEE/Postal code: 88266 /88600
- ^{1} French Land Register data, which excludes lakes, ponds, glaciers > 1 km^{2} (0.386 sq mi or 247 acres) and river estuaries.

Lépanges-sur-Vologne (French pronunciation: [lepɑ̃ʒ syʁ vɔlɔɲ], literally Lépanges on Vologne) is a commune in the Vosges department in Grand Est in northeastern France. It received considerable media attention during the Grégory Villemin murder case.

== See also ==
- Communes of the Vosges department
