= Bruyères =

- Commune
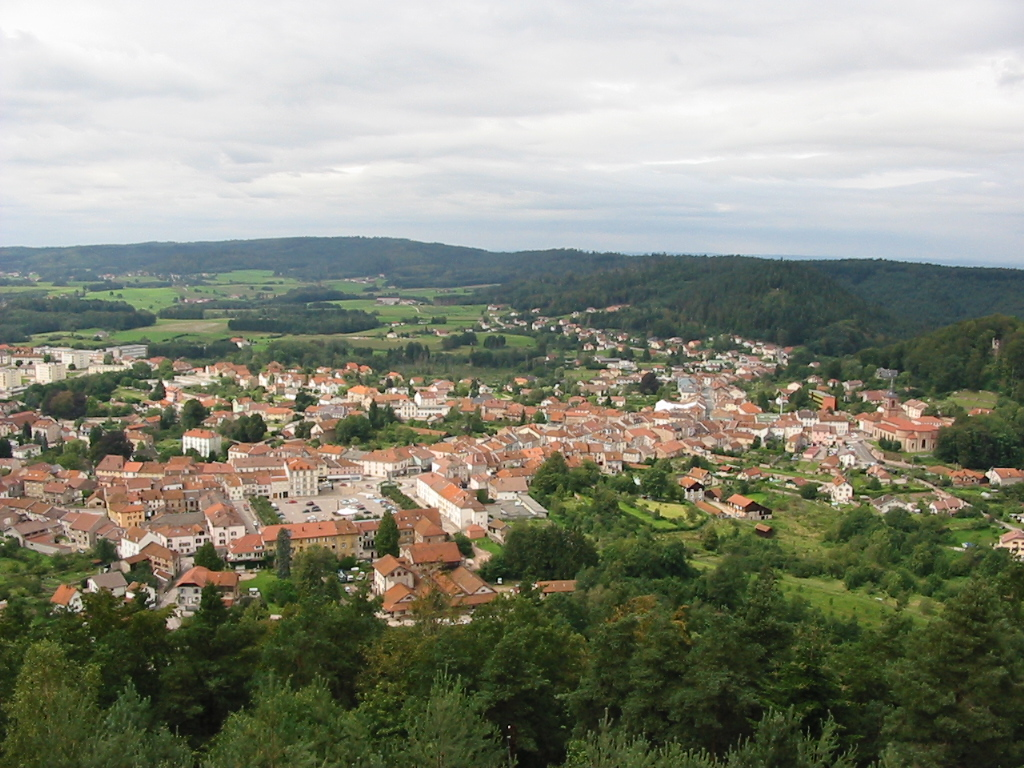
- A general view of Bruyères

- Coat of arms
- Location of Bruyères
- Location within France Location within Grand Est
- Coordinates: 48°12′30″N 6°43′16″E
- Country: France
- Region: Grand Est
- Department: Vosges
- Arrondissement: Saint-Dié-des-Vosges
- Canton: Bruyères
- Intercommunality: CC Bruyères - Vallons des Vosges

Government
  - Mayor (2025–2026): Ludovic Durain
- Area^{1}: 16.02 km^{2} (6.19 sq mi)
- Elevation: 493 m (1,617 ft)
- Highest elevation: 704 m (2,310 ft)
- Lowest elevation: 390 m (1,280 ft)
- Population (2023): 2,923
  - Density: 182.5/km^{2} (472.6/sq mi)
- Time zone: UTC+01:00 (CET)
  - Summer (DST): UTC+02:00 (CEST)
- INSEE/Postal code: 88078 /88600
- ^{1} French Land Register data, which excludes lakes, ponds, glaciers > 1 km^{2} (0.386 sq mi or 247 acres) and river estuaries.

Bruyères (French pronunciation: [bʁɥijɛʁ]) is a commune in the Vosges department in Grand Est in northeastern France.

The town built up around a castle built on a hill in the locality in the 6th century. It was the birthplace of Jean Lurçat, in 1892.

== History ==
In World War II, Bruyères was liberated from German occupation by Japanese-American soldiers of the 442nd Regimental Combat Team. The 100th/442nd Regiment became the most decorated Unit in the History of the US Army (8 Presidential Unit Citation, 21 Medal of Honor and 18,143 individual decorations). On 8 and 9 July 1989 the bicentennial of the presentation of the "Bill of Human Rights" by Mounier, Pierre Moulin created and inaugurated the "Peace and Freedom Trail." Encompassing 89 points of interest, the "Peace and Freedom Trail" highlights the actions of the 442nd RCT and their campaign to free Bruyères from German occupation during World War II.

- Arboretum du col du Haut-Jacques

== Population ==
Historical population
Year	Pop.	±% p.a.
1968	3,767	—
1975	3,852	+0.32%
1982	3,679	−0.65%
1990	3,368	−1.10%
1999	3,362	−0.02%
2007	3,310	−0.19%
2012	3,176	−0.82%
2017	3,064	−0.72%
2023	2,923	−0.78%
Source: INSEE

== Notable residents ==
- Gaston About

== Twin towns ==
- Vielsalm (Belgium)
- Honolulu (United States)

== See also ==
- Communes of the Vosges department
