= Canton of Saint-Dié-des-Vosges-Est =

Coordinates: 48°17′1″N 6°56′56″E

Saint-Dié-des-Vosges-Est
- Former canton
- Interactive map of Saint-Dié-des-Vosges-Est
- Country: France
- Region: Grand Est
- Department: Vosges
- No. of communes: {{{nbcomm}}}
- Disbanded: 2015
- Population (2012): 19,795

The Canton of Saint-Dié-des-Vosges-Est is a French former administrative and electoral grouping of communes in the Vosges département of eastern France and in the region of Lorraine. It was disbanded following the French canton reorganisation which came into effect in March 2015. It consisted of 16 communes, which joined the canton of Saint-Dié-des-Vosges-2 in 2015. It had 19,795 inhabitants (2012).

One of 9 cantons in the Arrondissement of Saint-Dié-des-Vosges, the Canton of Saint-Dié-des-Vosges-Est had its administrative centre at Saint-Dié-des-Vosges.

== Composition ==
The Canton of Saint-Dié-des-Vosges-Est comprised the following 16 communes:

- Ban-de-Laveline
- Bertrimoutier
- Coinches
- Combrimont
- Frapelle
- Gemaingoutte
- Lesseux
- Nayemont-les-Fosses
- Neuvillers-sur-Fave
- Pair-et-Grandrupt
- Raves
- Remomeix
- Saint-Dié-des-Vosges (eastern part)
- Sainte-Marguerite
- Saulcy-sur-Meurthe
- Wisembach
