= Association of Galilée Valley communes =

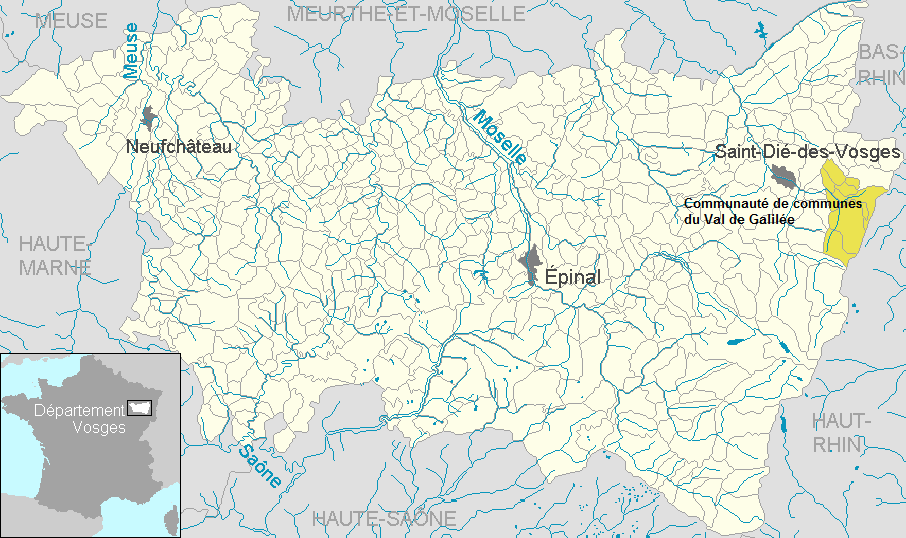
Map of the administrative association (highlighted in yellow)

The Association of Galilée Valley communes (French: Communauté de communes du Val de Galilée) is a former administrative association of communes in the Vosges département of eastern France and in the region of Lorraine. It was created in December 1997. It was merged into the Communauté de communes Fave, Meurthe, Galilée in January 2014, which was merged into the new Communauté d'agglomération de Saint-Dié-des-Vosges in January 2017. Positioned 15 minutes to the east of Saint-Dié-des-Vosges, bordering the ridge that forms the mountainous frontier between Alsace and Lorraine, the association has its administrative offices at Ban-de-Laveline. Seven of the association's ten communes are within the Ballons des Vosges Nature Park.

== Composition ==
Created at the end of 1997, initially comprising just three communes, the association ultimately consisted of 10 communes as follows:

1. Ban-de-Laveline (1997)
2. Bertrimoutier (1999)
3. Combrimont (1999)
4. La Croix-aux-Mines (2003)
5. Frapelle (1999)
6. Gemaingoutte (1997)
7. Lesseux (1999)
8. Neuvillers-sur-Fave (1999)
9. Raves (1999)
10. Wisembach (1997)
