= Communauté de communes de la Fave =

Former French admin association of rural communes

The Communauté de communes de la Fave is a French former administrative association of rural communes in the Vosges département of eastern France and in the region of Lorraine. It was created in December 1994 and had its administrative offices at Provenchères-sur-Fave. It was merged into the Communauté de communes Fave, Meurthe, Galilée in January 2014, which was merged into the new Communauté d'agglomération de Saint-Dié-des-Vosges in January 2017. It takes its name from the little river Fave.

The Communauté de communes comprised the following communes:

- Le Beulay
- Colroy-la-Grande
- La Grande-Fosse
- La Petite-Fosse
- Lubine
- Lusse
- Provenchères-sur-Fave
