= Association of Fave and Meurthe communes =

The Association of Fave and Meurthe communes (French: Communauté de communes de la Fave et de la Meurthe) is a former administrative association of communes in the Vosges département of eastern France and in the region of Lorraine. It was created in December 1997. It was merged into the Communauté de communes Fave, Meurthe, Galilée in January 2014, which was merged into the new Communauté d'agglomération de Saint-Dié-des-Vosges in January 2017. The association had its administrative offices at Remomeix. It takes its name from the rivers Fave and Meurthe which flow across it.

The Communauté de communes comprised the following communes:

- Coinches
- Nayemont-les-Fosses
- Pair-et-Grandrupt
- Remomeix
- Sainte-Marguerite
