= Canton of Provenchères-sur-Fave =

Coordinates: 48°18′31″N 7°4′9″E

Provenchères-sur-Fave
- Former canton
- Interactive map of Provenchères-sur-Fave
- Country: France
- Region: Grand Est
- Department: Vosges
- No. of communes: {{{nbcomm}}}
- Disbanded: 2015
- Area: 33.8 km^{2} (13.1 sq mi)
- Population (2012): 2,417
  - Density: 71.5/km^{2} (185/sq mi)

The Canton of Provenchères-sur-Fave is a former French administrative and electoral grouping of communes in the Vosges département of eastern France and in the region of Lorraine. It was disbanded following the French canton reorganisation which came into effect in March 2015. It consisted of 7 communes, which joined the canton of Saint-Dié-des-Vosges-2 in 2015. It had 2,417 inhabitants (2012).

One of 9 cantons in the Arrondissement of Saint-Dié-des-Vosges, the Canton of Provenchères-sur-Fave had its administrative centre at Provenchères-sur-Fave.

== Composition ==
The canton comprised the following communes:

- Le Beulay
- Colroy-la-Grande
- La Grande-Fosse
- Lubine
- Lusse
- La Petite-Fosse
- Provenchères-sur-Fave

== History ==
The communes listed above were formerly part of the Canton of Saales. Following the Franco-Prussian War, however, in 1871, the Canton of Saales was partitioned between France and Germany. The part remaining in France became the new canton of Provenchères-sur-Fave. In 1919 the formerly German portion of the original Canton of Saales was returned to France, but the decision was taken not to redraw the departmental frontiers more than necessary, so that now the Canton of Saales is in the region of Alsace, leaving the canton of Provenchères-sur-Fave in region of Lorraine, as one of the smallest cantons in France.
