= Fave =

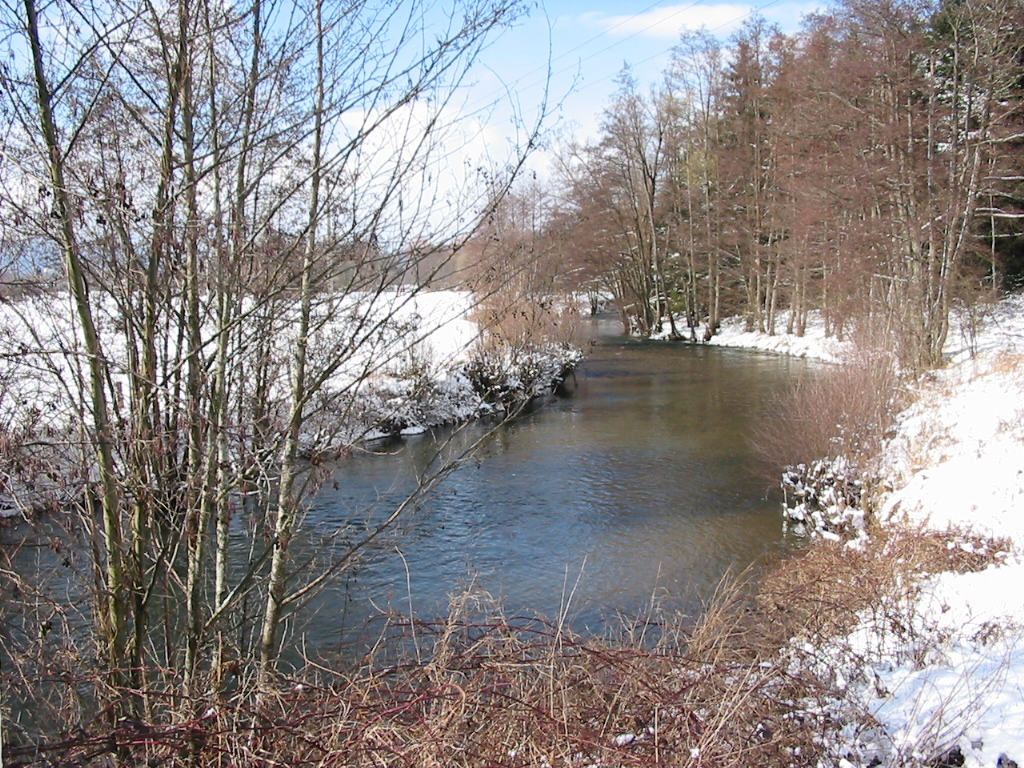
- Winter, near Sainte-Marguerite

- Location within France Location within Grand Est
- Etymology: Old French

Location
- Country: France
- Region: Grand Est
- Department: Vosges

Physical characteristics
- Source
  - location: Lubine, Vosges Mountains
- Mouth: Meurthe
  - location: Sainte-Marguerite, Vosges
  - coordinates: 48.2798°N 6.9805°E
- Length: 22.2 km (13.8 mi)
- Discharge
  - average: 3.31 m^{3}/s (117 cu ft/s)

Basin features
- Progression: Meurthe→ Moselle→ Rhine→ North Sea

The Fave (French pronunciation: [fav]) is a river in France in the eastern region of Lorraine. It flows in the Vosges département. It is a tributary of the Meurthe, thus a sub-tributary of the Moselle and of the Rhine. It is 22.2 km (13.8 mi) long.

== Geography ==
The Fave rises at Lubine at the foot of Climont in the Vosges massif, and flows into the Meurthe at Sainte-Marguerite at the end of its 22-kilometre (14 mi) course. It flows through the grassland of the communes of Colroy, Provenchères-sur-Fave, Le Beulay, Frapelle and Neuvillers, passing by the hamlet of Vanifosse in the Pair-et-Grandrupt commune before Remomeix. Its principal tributaries are the "Sainte-Catherine" stream which comes out of La Grande-Fosse, the "Bleu" which flows from Lusse and the "Morte" which flows from Ban-de-Laveline, this latter augmented by the waters of the "Blanc Rû".

The river's name is found in the title of two groupings of communes, the Communauté de communes de la Fave and the Communauté de communes de la Fave et de la Meurthe.

== History and toponymy ==
The river shares its name with the village of Fave, which spread over the middle of the valley well before the 12th century. Having become a hamlet after the 16th century, it was left only a ruin after the Thirty Years War.

According to old mountain-dwellers, the source of the Fave was worshipped at Fouillepré upstream of Lubine. According to this cultural model, all the modest tributaries upstream of Lubine, which come from Climont, les Osières, la Jambe de fer and other slopes or small valleys, were referred to as "petites Faves" (little Faves). Their confluence created the Fave. A probable etymology of the word Fave is from the Old French meaning water which digs or searches. This bears resemblance to the Gaulish "murta" meaning to dig, gully or laugh, which gave rise to the Meurthe river, to the Morte (a tributary of the Fave which joins in the channels of the low grassland between Neuvillers and Vanifosse), and to the Mortagne, which flows into the Meurthe further downstream.

Downstream of Colroy the river has been intensively built on. A part of its waters were diverted with barrages to feed hydraulic installations or mères-royes, a local name for the main fittings used to irrigate humid grassland. More tenuous constructions aided log floating.

== Hydrology ==
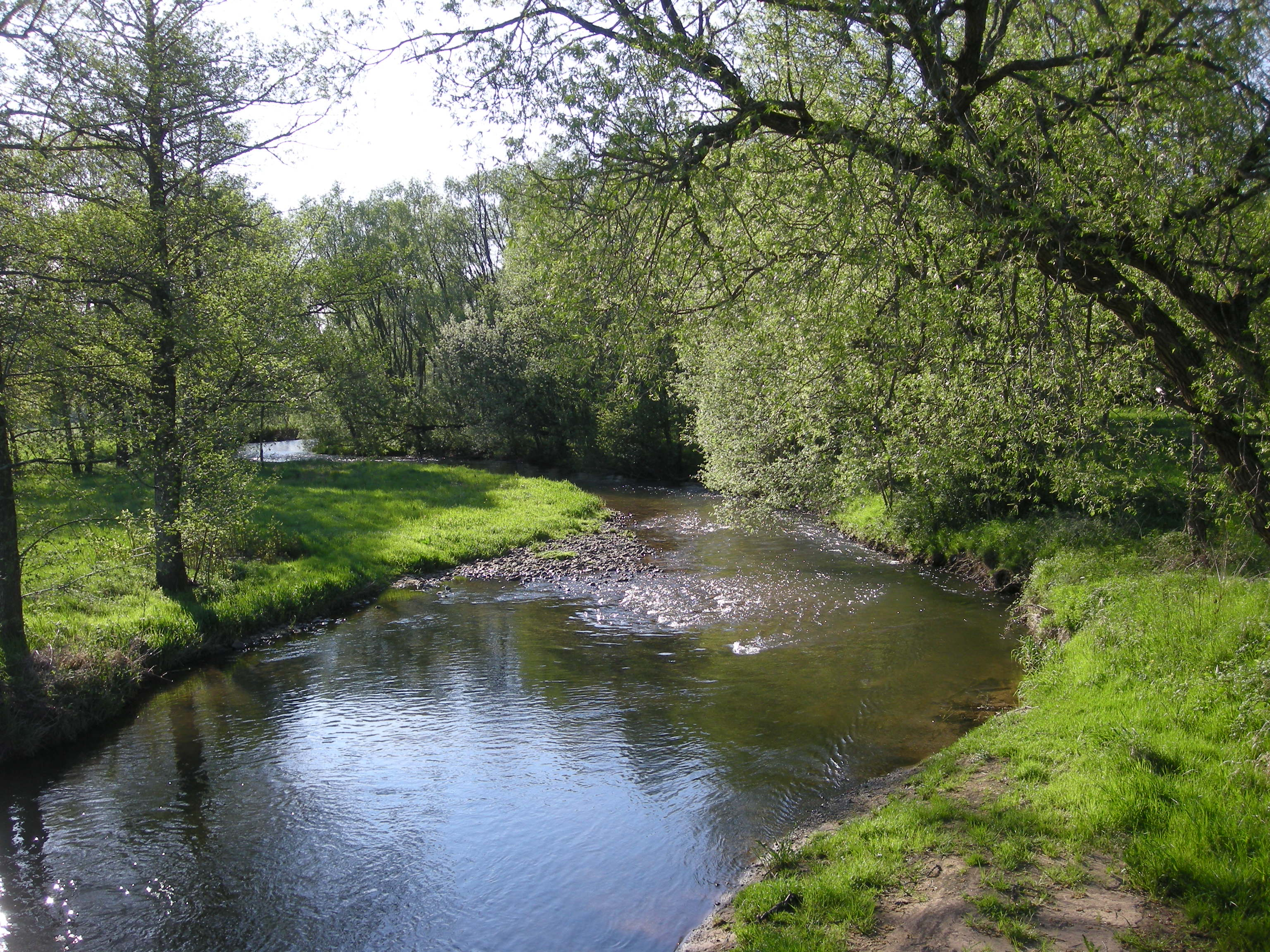
The Fave in the Remomeix commune

The Fave is a substantial river considering the relative smallness of its watershed. The mean interannual flow rate or discharge at its confluence with the Meurthe is 3.31 cubic metres per second (117 cu ft/s) for a watershed of 178.1 square kilometres (69 mi^{2}). The runoff curve number in the watershed is 586 millimetres (23.1 in), which is high, almost twice that of the average of France with all watersheds included, and also larger than that of the French Moselle basin by a wide margin. In fact the Moselle's runoff at Hauconcourt, near where it exits France, rises to only 445 millimetres (17.5 in). The specific flow rate of the Fave comes out at 18.59 litres per second per square kilometre of watershed.

== Flora and fauna ==
Fish species found in the river include trout, perch, carp, roach. Also present are water scorpions, snails, caddisfly larvae, fish fry, red-eared sliders, rare snakes, crayfish, leeches and dragonfly. Plants include bamboo species and aquatic equisetopsida.

== See also ==
- List of rivers of France
- Meurthe (river)
