= Pair-et-Grandrupt =

- Commune
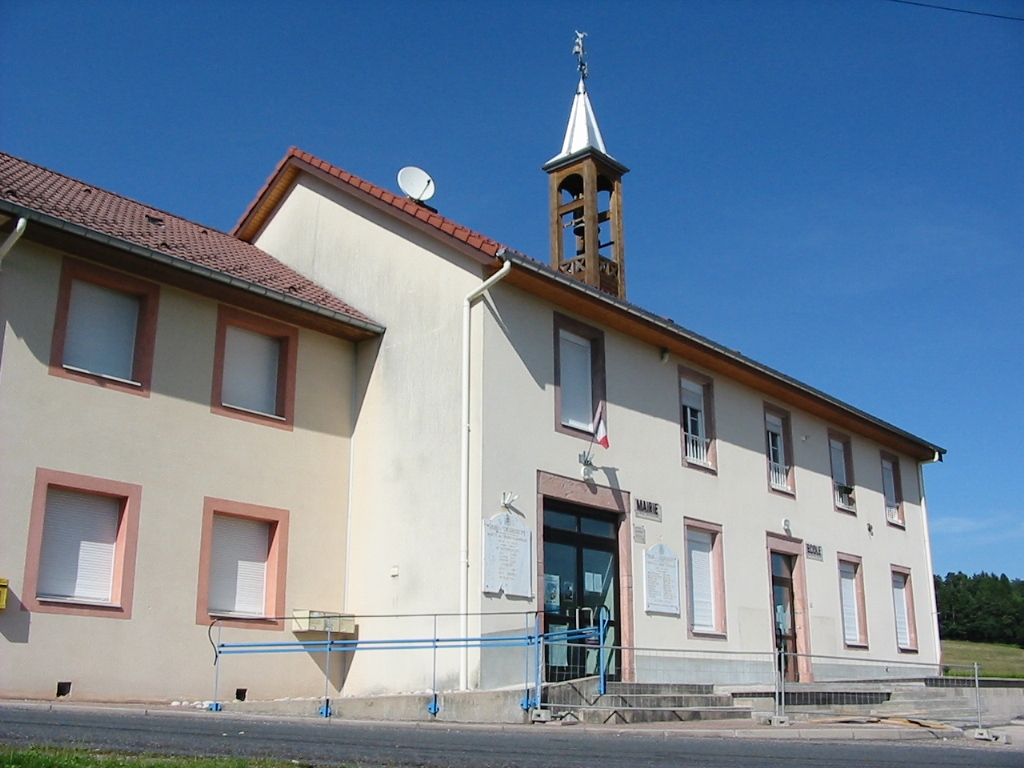
- The town hall in Pair-et-Grandrupt
- Location of Pair-et-Grandrupt
- Location within France Location within Grand Est
- Coordinates: 48°16′55″N 7°01′10″E
- Country: France
- Region: Grand Est
- Department: Vosges
- Arrondissement: Saint-Dié-des-Vosges
- Canton: Saint-Dié-des-Vosges-2
- Intercommunality: CA Saint-Dié-des-Vosges

Government
  - Mayor (2020–2026): Jean-Marie Gle
- Area^{1}: 4.58 km^{2} (1.77 sq mi)
- Elevation: 388 m (1,273 ft)
- Highest elevation: 474 m (1,555 ft)
- Lowest elevation: 354 m (1,161 ft)
- Population (2023): 486
  - Density: 106/km^{2} (275/sq mi)
- Time zone: UTC+01:00 (CET)
  - Summer (DST): UTC+02:00 (CEST)
- INSEE/Postal code: 88341 /88100
- ^{1} French Land Register data, which excludes lakes, ponds, glaciers > 1 km^{2} (0.386 sq mi or 247 acres) and river estuaries.

Pair-et-Grandrupt (French pronunciation: [pɛʁ e ɡʁɑ̃ʁy]) is a commune in the Vosges department in Grand Est in northeastern France.

The commune takes its name from the two substantial hamlets of Le Pair et Grandrupt.

== Geography ==
The commune is spread over various little hills and valleys between the fields of the Fave valley (which has its source here at an altitude of 350 meters) and the mamillated Ormont Hills to the north. The territory of the commune forms a triangle between Neuvillers-sur-Fave to the east, Nayemont-les-Fosses to the west and north and Remomeix together with Sainte-Marguerite in the south.

For those unfamiliar with the traditional lay-out of mountain villages in the Vosges Mountains, the pattern of settlement in this commune may appear curiously dispersed: roads are underdeveloped and the uneven topography enforces a patchy and dispersed footprint for the hamlets. In fact developments in the twentieth century have in some ways contributed to the spreading of the settlement pattern. In common with many rural communes, Pair-et-Grandrupt suffered a prolonged population decline which set in after the agricultural depression which started in the 1870s and from which there was no sustained recovery until the second half of the twentieth century. In this commune, however, the trend reversed as the motor transport revolution improved general access to rural communes: population has risen strongly since 1972. Between 1968 and 1999 registered population (excluding double counting in respect of students and others with two registered homes) increased from 200 to 439, and the construction of a modern water supply network supported by appropriate pipes and pumps has made it possible to build on formerly dry mountainside sites, and at levels of housing density which in earlier centuries was not possible simply because the nearest usable water supply was insufficient and/or too far away.

== Ecclesiastical ==
The religious tradition here has been characterised by chapel-style Christianity. The commune has no church or curé of its own, being still part of the large parish of Bertrimoutier. Beside the church at Bertrimoutier is a large cemetery-ossuary which for centuries has welcomed the mortal remains of people from a wide area along the southern flank of the Ormont Hills. The rapid increase in population Pair-et-Grandrupt that has been underway since the final decades of the twentieth century is giving rise to discussion as to whether the needs of growing numbers of Christian believers in Pair-et-Grandrupt are now sufficiently served by The Church.

== History ==
The southern slopes of the Ormont Hills between the hamlet of Vanifosse and Frapelle have been owned and controlled between a dispersed succession of landlords and protectors, but the ecclesiastical administration has been a much more constant theme, the village being subject to the former monastery of Bertrimoutier and still, today, within the parish of Bertrimoutier.

During the early and middle Medieval periods, it is thought that Le Pair Grandrupt and Villers were part of a single extended village in the Duchy of Lorraine. At some point, probably in the fourteenth century and possibly in connection with plague induced depopulation, Villers disappeared. It was replaced by Neuvillers ("new Villars") a short distance to the east: but now that the territories of the various settlements were no longer contiguous, the communities drifted apart.

In 1594 the territory belonged to the provostship of Saint-Dié and the bailiwick of Nancy. Between the end of the Duchy of Burgundy in 1477 and the final incorporation of Lorraine into France that followed the death of the Last Duke in 1766, there were several French invasions and periods of occupation affecting Lorraine and other de facto buffer states between France and the Holy Roman Empire, but relatively untroubled in their mountain seclusion the administrative arrangements of the hamlets of Le Pair, Grandrupt and Vanifosse remained unchanged except that in 1710 the bailiwick was switched to Saint-Dié.

== See also ==
- Communes of the Vosges department
