= Léonie de Bazelaire =

French painter and writer (1857–1926)

Marie Léonie de Bazelaire de Ruppierre
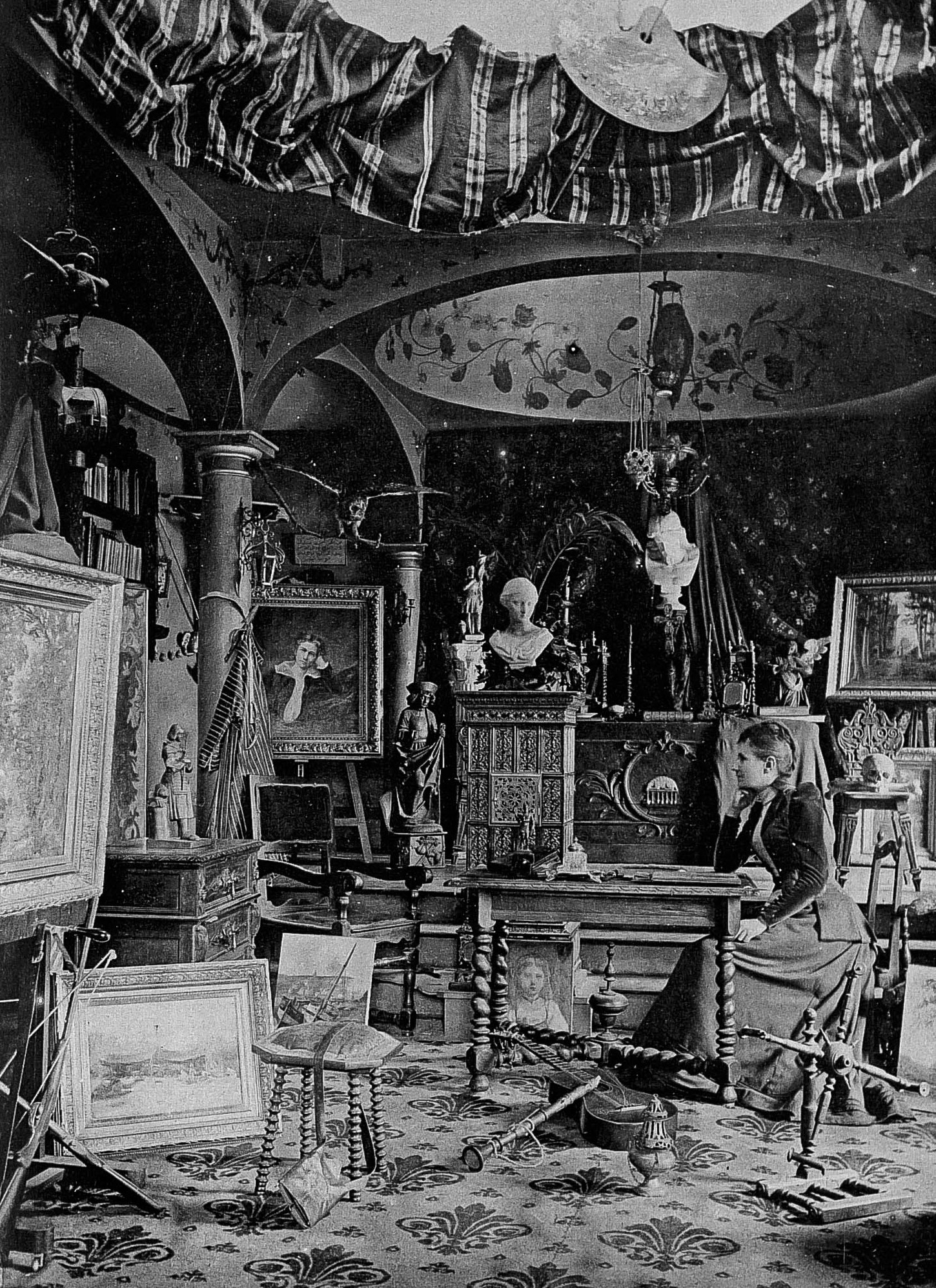
- Léonie de Bazelaire, in St-Dié, 1894
- Born: May 19, 1857; Sainte-Marguerite, Vosges
- Died: July 23, 1926 (aged 69); Cannet (Alpes-Maritimes)
- Resting place: Saint-Dié-des-Vosges
- Notable work: Chevauchée en Palestine (1889)

Marie Léonie de Bazelaire de Ruppierre (May 19, 1857– July 23, 1926) was a French painter and writer. In addition to writing several travel books, she was the founder and director of La Chevauchée, a bimonthly literary review for women that published between 1900 and 1903.

== Family ==
Léonie de Bazelaire was the daughter of Marie-Charles Sigisbert de Bazelaire de Saulcy (1812-1867) and Marie Anne Victoire Louise Florentin (1814-1903).

She had seven brothers and sisters, She grew up in Saulcy-sur-Meurthe and then studied at Saint-Dié, before her father was named a justice of the peace in Ligny-en-Barrois.

Her uncle, Édouard de Bazelaire (1819-1853) was a writer, a member of the Académie de Stanislas, a chevalier of the order of Saint-Grégoire-le-Grand, and author of Promenades dans les Vosges (1838).

== Travel writing ==
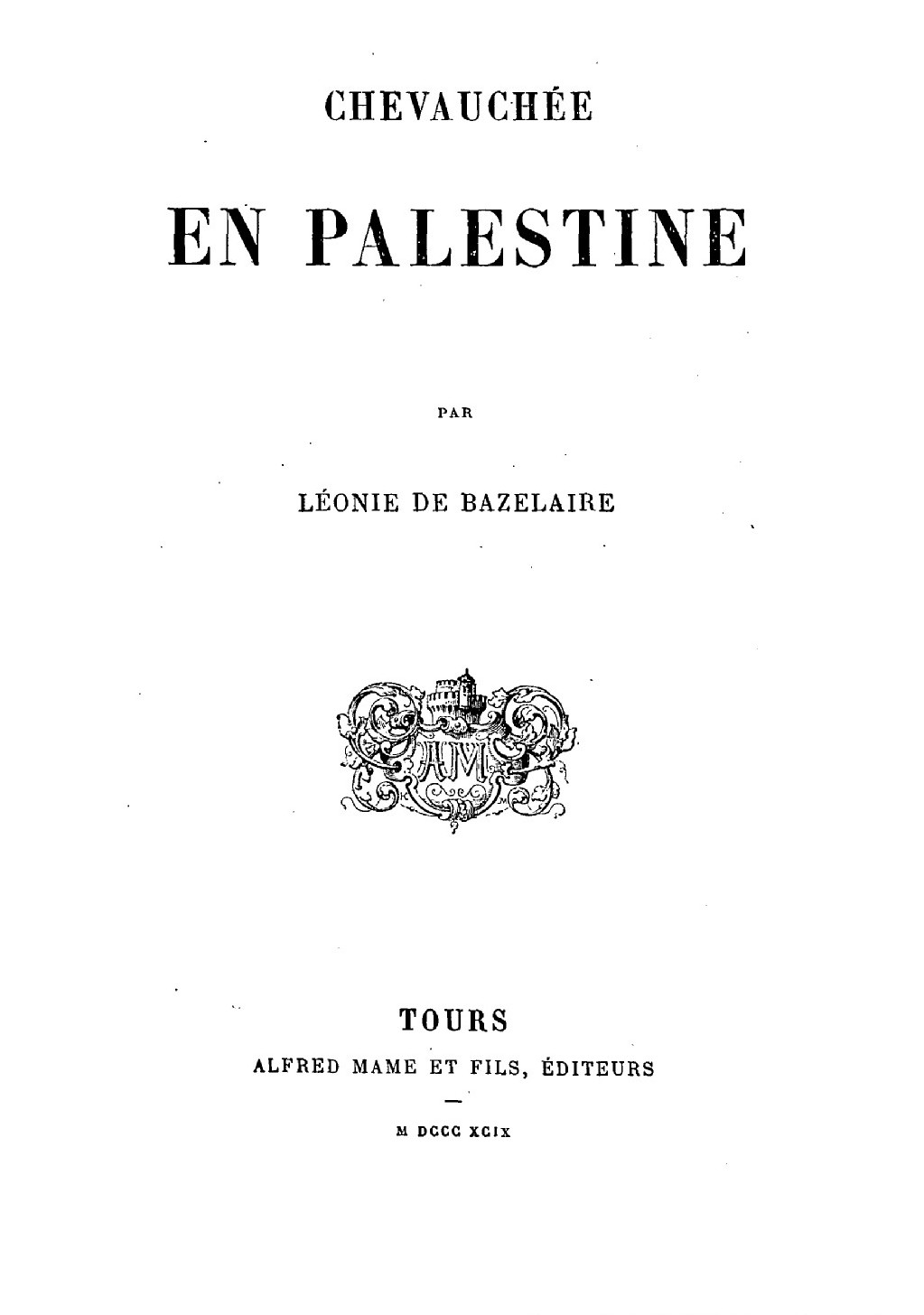
Title page for Chevauchée en Palestine by Léonie de Bazelaire

In April 1888, she went by boat to Palestine with a group of pilgrims. After a stop in Italy where she visited Rome, and one in Crète, the pilgrim's boat dropped anchor in Haifa. Accompanied by her brother Maurice (1840-1909) and her sister Isabelle (1847-1889), they departed on horseback, for a month to tour the country. During this time she wrote Chevauchée en Palestine (1889). After the trip, she published Mois du Sacré-Cœur de Terre Sainte (1890).

Two years later, in 1890, she travelled by rail in Haute-Bavière, to help with the Oberammergau Passion Play, which has taken place since 1634 and which, every two years, involves a large part of the population. She described the event in great detail in her work Le drame d’Oberammergau (1891).

She travelled as well to Egypt, which resulted in the publication of Jérusalem, cinq ans après. Une fuite en Égypte (1893). In Khartoum, in 1907, she met the writer Pierre Loti at the Luxor Temple. In 1912, she published Croquis d'Égypte et de Nubie, which was reviewed in Les Annales politiques et littéraires

In addition to her travel writing, she published a biographical essay on Jeanne d’Arc titled Figure Exquise (1895), and three theatre pieces: L’idée de Colette (1897), Os de Poulet (1897) et Trèfle à quatre feuilles.

== Painting career ==
She studied painting and drawing with Édouard de Mirbeck in Saint-Dié. She was later the student of painters Pierre-Eugène Grandsire, Carolus-Duran and Jean-Jacques Henner.

She painted portraits and showed regularly in the areas of Épinal, Remiremont, Saint-Dié and Cannes. In May 1882, she presented her work Sous-bois dans les Vosges at the Grand Palais des Champs-Elysées, Paris.

== Collections ==
- Paysages de montagne dans les Vosges, Hermitage Museum, Saint Petersburg

== Death ==
She died in Cannet, having served during the First World War as a nurse, for which she received the croix de guerre. She was a Chevalier de la Légion d'honneur. She was buried in Saint-Dié, July 29, 1926.

== Bibliography ==
=== Travel writing ===
- Chevauchée en Palestine, Alfred Mame, 1889 (7 reprints).
- Mois du Sacré Cœur de Terre Sainte, Wagner, 1890.
- Le drame d’Oberammergau, P. Lethielleux, 1893.
- Jérusalem cinq ans après ! Une fuite en Égypte, Éd. de l’Assomption, 1893.
- Croquis d'Égypte et de Nubie, 1912.

=== Biographies ===
- Figure exquise, Victor Retaux, 1895
- Préface à : Édouard de Bazelaire, Saint Pierre Fourier, surnommé le Bon Père de Mattaincourt, Nancy, Crépin Leblond, 1897.

=== Theatre ===
- Os de Poulet, comédie en deux actes, Librairie théâtrale, 1897.
- L’idée de Colette, comédie en un acte, Librairie théâtrale, 1897.
- Trèfle à quatre feuilles.

== External link ==
- Works by Léonie de Bazelaire at Gallica
