= Provenchères-sur-Fave =

- Part of Provenchères-et-Colroy
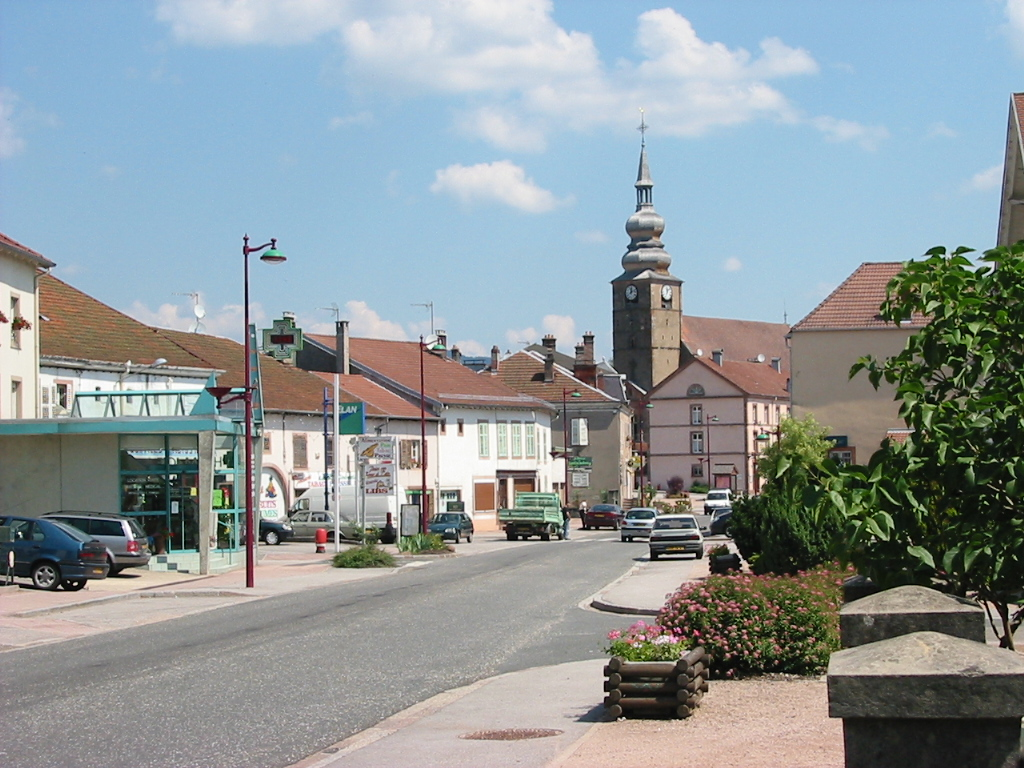

- Coat of arms
- Location of Provenchères-sur-Fave
- Location within France Location within Grand Est
- Coordinates: 48°18′28″N 7°04′46″E
- Country: France
- Region: Grand Est
- Department: Vosges
- Arrondissement: Saint-Dié-des-Vosges
- Canton: Saint-Dié-des-Vosges-2
- Commune: Provenchères-et-Colroy
- Area^{1}: 7.27 km^{2} (2.81 sq mi)
- Highest elevation: 651 m (2,136 ft)
- Lowest elevation: 393 m (1,289 ft)
- Population (2022): 820
  - Density: 110/km^{2} (290/sq mi)
- Time zone: UTC+01:00 (CET)
  - Summer (DST): UTC+02:00 (CEST)
- Postal code: 88490
- ^{1} French Land Register data, which excludes lakes, ponds, glaciers > 1 km^{2} (0.386 sq mi or 247 acres) and river estuaries.

Provenchères-sur-Fave (French pronunciation: [pʁɔvɑ̃ʃɛʁ syʁ fav], literally Provenchères on Fave) is a former commune in the Vosges department in northeastern France. On 1 January 2016, it was merged into the new commune Provenchères-et-Colroy. Inhabitants are called Provenchérois. Provenchères-sur-Fave should not be confused with Provenchères-lès-Darney in the same department.

== Geography ==
The population of the commune is divided between the village of Provenchères and surrounding hamlets such as Brafosse. As its name indicates, the commune is positioned beside the river Fave, on its left bank. The Fave is a tributary of the Meurthe.

Provenchères-sur-Fave is on the western side of the Vosges Mountains. On the horizon the neighbouring conifer dressed hills of triassic sandstone stand out clearly: to the west the Ormont Mountain has its peak, at 900 meters, well clear of the tree line. The Spitzemberg at just 640 meters which at one time hosted an observation fortress dominates the valley: further along the same range are the isolated Voyemont (793 meters) and the high plateau of Climont (965 meters) towards the north-east. Nevertheless, within the territory of the commune itself stretched between the Fave Valley and the foot of the Spitzemberg, the altitude rises only to 651 meters, above the hamlet of Truches, and near to the old road connecting with the Grande Fosse pilgrimage route.

The village is crossed by the national road RN 420 which connects it with Saint-Dié some 16 kilometres (10 mi) to the southeast and, via a not particularly direct crossing of the Vosges Mountains, Strasbourg to the north-east. The western access point to the recently reopened Tunnel Maurice-Lemaire through the mountains towards Sélestat is some 7 kilometres (4 mi) to the south-east.

The commune is fully within the Ballons des Vosges Nature Park.

== The name ==
Provenchères-sur-Fave may be identified with "Pervincaria", mentioned in rough Latin notes from the thirteenth century. Subsequent names include Provencheriae, Provenchères and, in the nineteenth century, Provenchères-en-Vosges.

== History ==
Seventeenth century wars including, most destructively, the Thirty Years' War and the invasions of France's allies, the Swedes, led to hunger and plague. The early decades of the century also seem to have seen an above average level of poor harvests caused by bad weather: in Provenchères recorded deaths greatly outnumbered recorded births during the middle decades of the century, and there is also evidence of people simply moving away from the devastated region. Around 1660 the parish of Provenchères numbered sixty families, most of them much impoverished. By 1700, however, there were approximately 180 taxable homesteads, indicating significant recovery from the depopulation that characterised the middle part of the seventeenth century, and by the 1760s the population had probably risen to between 800 and 900. It is fair to point out that these population trends echoed the experience of many towns and villages in Lorraine between 1618 and he region's eventual formal incorporation into France when the last duke died in 1766.

During the nineteenth century, until 1870, Provenchères-en-Vosges, was one of the many communes in the Canton of Saales. The annexation by Germany of Alsace and a large chunk of Lorraine left the Canton of Saales arbitrarily split down the line of a mountain ridge. Separated from Saales, Provenchères-en-Vosges found itself promoted to the status of an administrative centre of its own commune. Frontier town status seems to have benefited the local economy. Ten years later, in 1881, the name of the town was changed to Provenchères-sur-Fave. In 1919, in the aftermath of another war, France recovered Alsace-Lorraine, but there was no appetite to recreate the departmental boundaries as they had been before 1870. The Canton of Saales and the Canton of Provenchères-sur-Fave retained their separate identities, and it is for these historical reasons that until 2015 Provenchères-sur-Fave remained the administrative centre of one of the smallest cantons in France.

== See also ==
- Communes of the Vosges department
- Hantzbahn
