= La Croix-aux-Mines =

- Commune
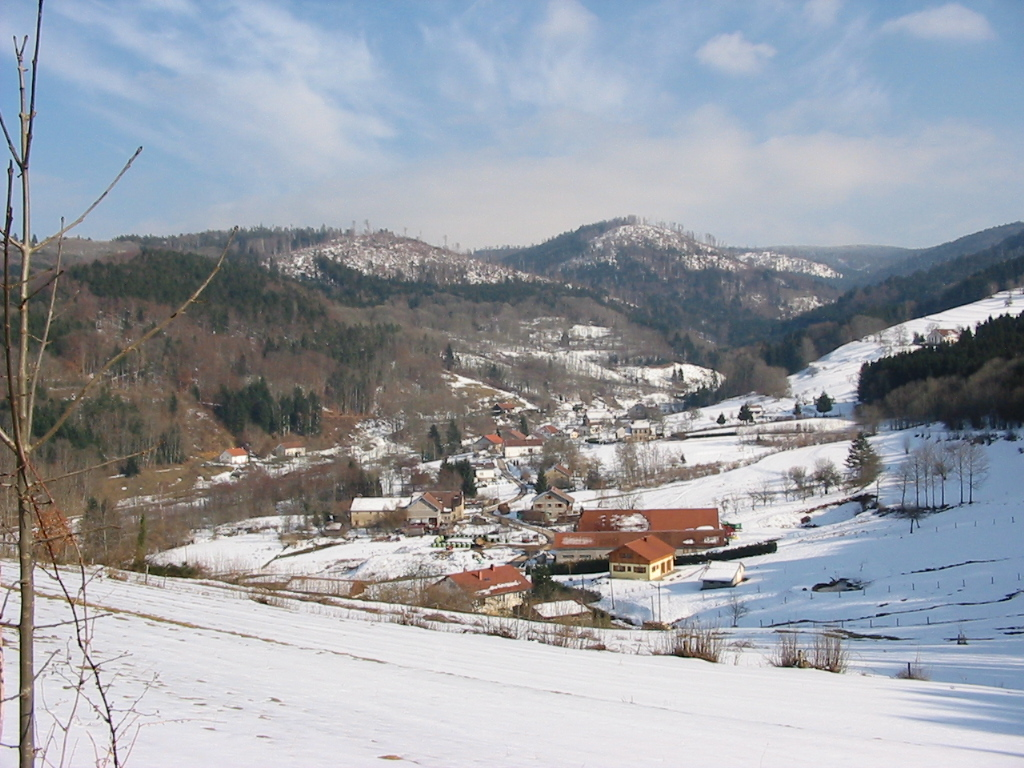
- Village of Chipal

- Coat of arms
- Location of La Croix-aux-Mines
- Location within France Location within Grand Est
- Coordinates: 48°13′15″N 7°03′00″E
- Country: France
- Region: Grand Est
- Department: Vosges
- Arrondissement: Saint-Dié-des-Vosges
- Canton: Saint-Dié-des-Vosges-2
- Intercommunality: CA Saint-Dié-des-Vosges

Government
  - Mayor (2020–2026): Jean-Yves Auzène
- Area^{1}: 16.8 km^{2} (6.5 sq mi)
- Elevation: 525 m (1,722 ft)
- Highest elevation: 1,130 m (3,710 ft)
- Lowest elevation: 460 m (1,510 ft)
- Population (2023): 448
  - Density: 26.7/km^{2} (69.1/sq mi)
- Time zone: UTC+01:00 (CET)
  - Summer (DST): UTC+02:00 (CEST)
- INSEE/Postal code: 88120 /88520
- Website: www.lacroixauxmines.net
- ^{1} French Land Register data, which excludes lakes, ponds, glaciers > 1 km^{2} (0.386 sq mi or 247 acres) and river estuaries.

La Croix-aux-Mines (French pronunciation: [la kʁwa o min]) is a commune in the Vosges department in Grand Est in northeastern France.

== Geography ==
The commune occupies the high and narrow valley of the Morte (or Morthe), a left-bank tributary of the Fave, in the Vosges Mountains.

== History ==
Silver, copper, and mercury mines were exploited as early as the 10th century for the benefit of the monasteries of Moyenmoutier and Saint-Dié. From the 14th century onward, they were exploited solely for the benefit of the Duke of Lorraine. The three main mining sites were named Saint-Nicolas, Saint-Jean, and Chipal.

In the second half of the 15th century, these mines were leased to Johannes Lud of Pfaffenhoffen and the Marshal of Lorraine, Oswald, Count of Thierstein. Johannes Lud was appointed as the mining magistrate and profited from the role. Upon his death in 1504, his brother Vautrin Lud, a canon of Saint-Dié, succeeded him.

== See also ==
- Communes of the Vosges department
