= Climont =

Peak in the Vosges mountains in France

- Weinberg (in Alsatian)
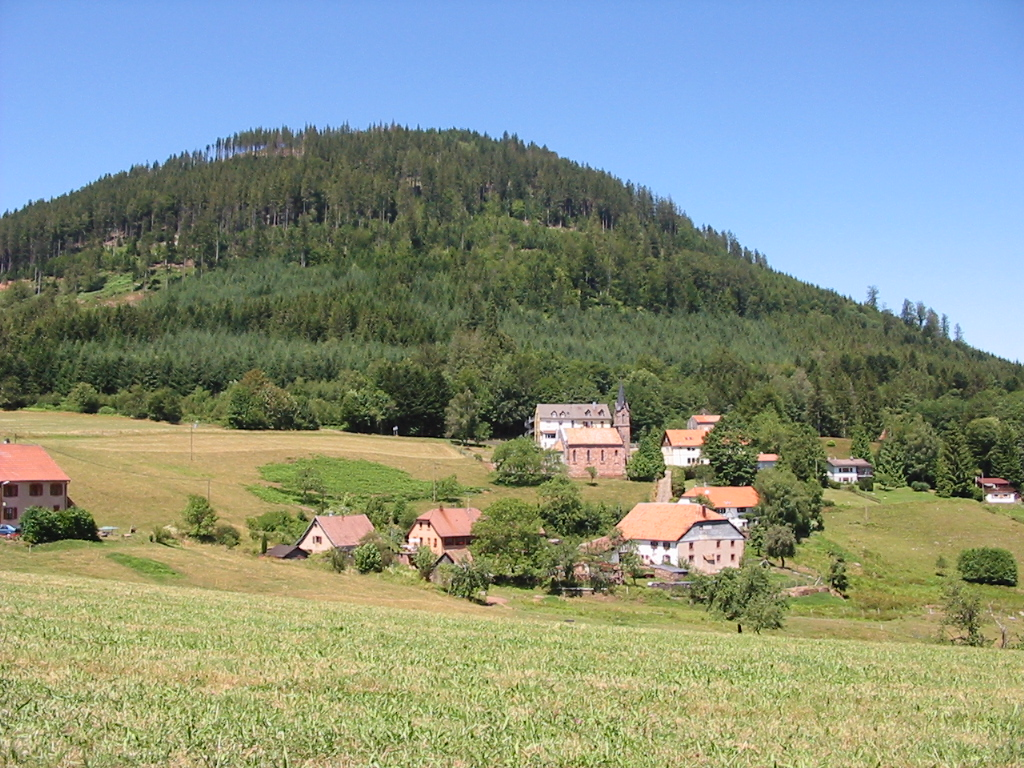
- Climont, hamlet and peak

Highest point
- Elevation: 965 m (3,166 ft)
- Coordinates: 48°20′45″N 007°11′06″E

Geography
- Location within France
- Location: France
- Parent range: Vosges

Climont (French pronunciation: [klimɔ̃]), formerly called "Clivemont" in Old French, and "Winberg" in Old Alsatian, is a conical sandstone peak of the Vosges mountains. The mountain, with a cut-off shape, is known from afar by walkers and modern-day travellers.

Situated today in Alsace to the south-west of the Champ du Feu, Clivemont's 965 metre peak is recognizable from a distance by its trapezoidal shape. The solitary tomb-shaped hill has long been a landmark to the south of the straight voie des saulniers (a salt trading route), at the start of the massif running from Ormont.

== Geography ==
Climont offers a panorama of the various surrounding valleys. The waterways which originate there include the river Fave in the south-west which flows into the Meurthe above Saint-Dié, the Bruche and several streams such as the winding Climontaise, which flow into Bourg-Bruche and Schirmeck to the north and finally the Giessen river to the south-east which flows towards Urbeis. The 360° view reveals Donon and the Val de Bruche to the north, the Val de Villé to the east, the middle Vosges to the south, and the Saint-Dié basin to the west.

The mountains, which beyond 650 or 700 metres up belong to the territory of the Urbeis commune, are highly prized by hill-walkers. The GR532 walking route passes by the south, and two routes marked by the Vosges Club (Club Vosgien) lead to the summit where a tower stands in memory of Julius Euting, commonly referred to as the "Tour Jules".

Climont has been visited by travellers from Lorraine on the Saulniers way, announcing the proximity of the Ungersberg massif and its hills overlooking the Alsatian plain. It is a prominent landmark for mountain-dwellers; its wide-ranging views of over the Saint-Dié basin allow humidity testing of air layers, and wind forecasting in case of unusual wind patterns such as the coldest winter breezes or east winds coming down from the mountains. The cone of Climont is identifiable from the Roche Saint-Martin and from the heights of Hadremont north or east of the Kemberg massif, but also at different heights to the south of the Fave valley. Drivers who take the fast route passing around Saint-Dié or entering the Fave valley in the direction of the Lusse tunnel or the Saales col can view Climont's slopes.

== Toponymy and legends ==
The dialect name, whether of German or Roman origin, means a cut-off shape, referring to the abrupt slopes which fall from Climont's ledged summit. "Winberg" probably comes from a corruption of "Winkberg" or "Winkleberg", just as "Climont" comes from the Latin "clivus mons". The oldest written name for Climont is "cilkenberg", dating from 1195.

Legend associates Climont with celibate, lonely or isolated people, or groups at odds with the norm. Monks and sects, notably Anabaptists, lived on the mountain's slopes. Magical beings living on Climont, spirits of grass, shrubs ad trees said to be the sole examples of their kind, are described as much by their shapes and movements as by their appearances to observers. Paradoxically, a large number of these singular creatures presided over meetings and particularly amorous liaisons. The plants gathered by Saint Jain would have powers of love potions for Tristan and Isolde.

== Geology ==
Climont is a mound bearing witness to sandstone of the Triassic, a vestige resulting from effective erosion pushed onto the pedestal of Permian sandstone. This latter formation basically corresponds to the post-Hercynian peneplain characteristic of the Primary era. In the Saales col, whose flat horizons appear as a peneplain to the eye, there is similarity between the mounds of Climont, Voyemont, Houssot or the hills which continue from Ormont, all to a greater or lesser extent released by erosion. Note that the final and most recent erosion has arisen from the enclosing faults, which emerged transverse to the Alsatian rift and stretch out towards the Saint-Dié area. They have also induced the collapse of Ormont and are active today, creating the sharp relief of the sandstone massif.

The countryside of Climont, shaped at the level of deep layers, is effectively an isthmus between the Permian basin of Saint-Dié and lLe Villé.

The sandstone mass of Climont is neither strongly nor deeply fissured, which has made it resistant to erosion. The waters on a conical prominence to the west descend via a waterfall towards Le Hang, forming the source of the Bruche. Beneath Le Hang, a dam has allowed a pond to form. Filled by the copious waters in the spring season, it was partially emptied by a floating of lost logs towards Schirmeck et Strasbourg before 1890.

To the west of the hamlet of Climont, going towards Colroy-la-Grande, are the oldest rocks in the Vosges, in the shape of a blade of stones observable at the surface over about 100 meters. These "formations of scales" belong to an old Precambrian pedestal; they are characterized by the shales of Le Villé dating to over 600 million years in the past. These formations, submitted to intense pressures, friction and crushing by the action of faults, contain gneiss with amphibole and garnet, known as Climont gneiss, but also syenitic granite. These crushed rocks or mylonites witness to an ancient metamorphism which occurred well before the shale deposits of Le Villé.

== History ==
A former stubble for cow grazing, once wider and now uncultivated, occupied the landmark summit of the Saulniers path.

Herds of goats appreciated the tough pasture of the slopes, partially exposed and covered with small young oaks, deciduous trees for the most part eclipsing the little surviving softwood, pines on the soil of gullies and firs in the shady basins. At the edges of the mound, particularly under the Easter basin near the houses of the Climont hamlet, meadows, pasture and fields show the agricultural vitality of the mountain communities during cold periods. The hamlet is a separate area to the east of the limits of Urbeis, parish and commune centre. It is traversed by the road linking the Urbeis col with the La Salcée col.

The terram de cilkenbergh cultam and incultam (land of Climont in its cultivated and uncultivated parts) appears in the list of property of the Baumgarten Abbey in 1195. Beyond the property received from the Duke of Lorraine at Fouchy in 1172, The Cistercian Baumgarten Abbey in Lorraine kept a temporary lordship over the ban de Provenchères, extended to the border of Saâles, recorded as the grangiam de Hanso (the Hang Grange, which became simply "Le Hang") and the grangiam de Fossa (The Fosse Grange, which became "La Grande-Fosse"), two other pieces of land in the same list. Oral tradition associates these pieces of land with persistent mining activity. Proper limits of Climont were not known outside the 17th century.

A Mennonite community from 1683, reinforced by anabaptist and then reformed protestants families found a late refuge on the mountain slopes. They lived in relative harmony with the modest Catholic families who had occupied Climont for centuries. According to land, habitat family and community details, an arbitrary initial distinction can be shown between two slopes of Climont, one belonging to Urbeis, and the other to Bourg-Bruche and Saâles. Under the Ancien Régime, this distinction retained an occasional relevance, although both areas were part of the manor of Le Villé.

=== Hamlet, farms, and Anabaptist censes of Climont ===
The hamlet of Climont, at an altitude of 670 metres around a small temple, is part of the Urbeis commune. Its Alsacian name of "Winberg" has been altered to "Weinberg". The use of German by a sizable Mennonite community from 1690 onwards, then a simultaneous mix of Anabaptists and Reformed after intermarriages during the 19th century, has progressively Germanized the old placenames, for instance:

- Schottsitt ("L'ombre" or "l'envers" in French)
- Schregsmatt
- Bientzigberg
- in den Mühren
- Sebastiansmatten ("Les prés de Sébastien")
- beim schürrel
- Obermittel
- Unterweid
- im Brechloch ("Rainrupt")
- im Schlag ("La Schlague")
- Hansmatten ("les prés du Jean")
- Langematten ("les grands prés")
- Kreutzweg ("La croix du chemin")
- Maettel ("le petit pré" or "la prêle")
- Sonnesitt ("Le soleil")

The altitude may seem modest but the permanent cultivation of the fields at the start of the 20th century after the coldest observed temperature in 1850 rarely extends past 600 metres within the Vosges massif. Some gardens and farmed fields in Climont are even higher than the 650 metres in altitude achieved by the Bellefosse cultivations. Other cultivated areas extend from 470 m (on the plain), 500 m (at Bourg-Bruche), 550 m (Natzviller and the clearing at Le Hand on the sun-facing slope belonging to Saales.

In 1760, a manorial map probably raised by the Christiani shows five buildings which are taken to be large farms. Although it has not been possible to count these "censes", they are described a century later, perhaps by the Rebers, as a house built of stone, covered with shingles, containing a kitchen, two bedrooms, a storeroom, shed and barn. Upstairs are two bedrooms, and two rooms characterized by an attic with several compartments, some full of grain and some stuffed with fodder. Three neighbouring buildings contain

- the barn, the stable, the pigpen mounted on the haylofts near the fountain.
- the oven and the forge.
- workers' quarters.

A large farm in Climont might contain six family dwellings. The men were both farmers of oats and grain, and breeders, tending their cattle and managing their hayfields to provide fodder. The workable land represented 105 acres, meadows 96 poles and gardens and orchards 316 feet.

In 1780, an inventory of the bailiwick of the county of Villé mentioned 90 Mennonites, composed of 1 widow, 17 couples, 29 boys and 26 girls. This may have represented the Anabaptists of the ban of Urbeis, of whom the majority lived on the lands of Climont.

En 1796, six farms were sold as national property. This included the white house which belonged to François Joseph Choiseul.

In 1850, 12 dwellings were recorded as well as a house in the forest. The inhabitants had a modest way of life, as suggested by the timid Climont Mennonites who in no way imposed themselves in meetings of the Le Hang council. Jean Dellenbach, a Climont labourer belonging to one of the leading Anabaptist families, left the inventory of his goods with the Boersch notary on 16 February 1848. The total amounted to 223 Francs, of which the following is a part:

- two fir bedsteads (6F)
- a bed, mattress, pillow and dessous-de-plume (18F)
- two sheets and two hemp pillowcases (10F)
- a cherrywood table (8F)
- a lockable fir trunk
- kitchen utensils (a firepot and pan)
- 30 double-decaliters of potatoes (45F)
- a cow, estimated value (70F)
- 750 kg of hay (about 52.5F)
- 20 bales of straw
- common tools: a hoe, a pickaxe, a shovel, a hatchet, an ax, a knife

A sometimes distant rural exodus had begun on Climont, but those who lived there were persevering and developing non-farming-related pursuits: stonecutting, distilling, and weaving after the arrival of weavers who had relocated their small clothesmaking businesses for economic reasons from the textile towns. During the Second Empire, Joseph Elias, a Jewish trader from Scherviller, sold 11 ares of Climont land to Adam Brua, a weaver. He noted that the land parcel sold was beside Jacques Schlabach, who had left for America, disembarking at New York City or New Orleans.

The number of Mennonites and Reformed on Climont in 1889 was 53. After over a century, three large, prominent and related families controlled the Climont community, Dellenbach (Dellembach), Bacher (Boecher, Becher, Pacher, Pêcheur) and Beller. Without attaching religious claims, they quickly tolerated mixed marriages between Anabaptists and Protestants at the level of elite farmers and proprietors. In 1790, Elisabeth, a 25-year-old Dellenbach girl, married a Protestant from Plaine, provoking the first break in the Anabaptist community's management of the former manorial lands of Villé.

By 1970 there were no Mennonites in the hamlet. A private cemetery with three tombstones hosts the remains of, among others, the last member of the Bacher family who died forty years prior.

=== Le Hang valley to the west ===
The valley of Le Hang, containing the source of the Bruche, today forms a vast clearing, mostly within the Bourg-Bruche commune with a part of its western edge in Saales. In 1710, this dry valley was covered with scrub oak in sparse thickets. A crystal glass factory employed a large number of workers and loggers on a seasonal basis. Mennonites from Switzerland employed in this difficult work gradually settled in the valley situated beneath Le Hang. In 1780, 70 anabaptists were hired to work in the clearing of Le Hang for the glass manufacturers.

== The tour Julius ==
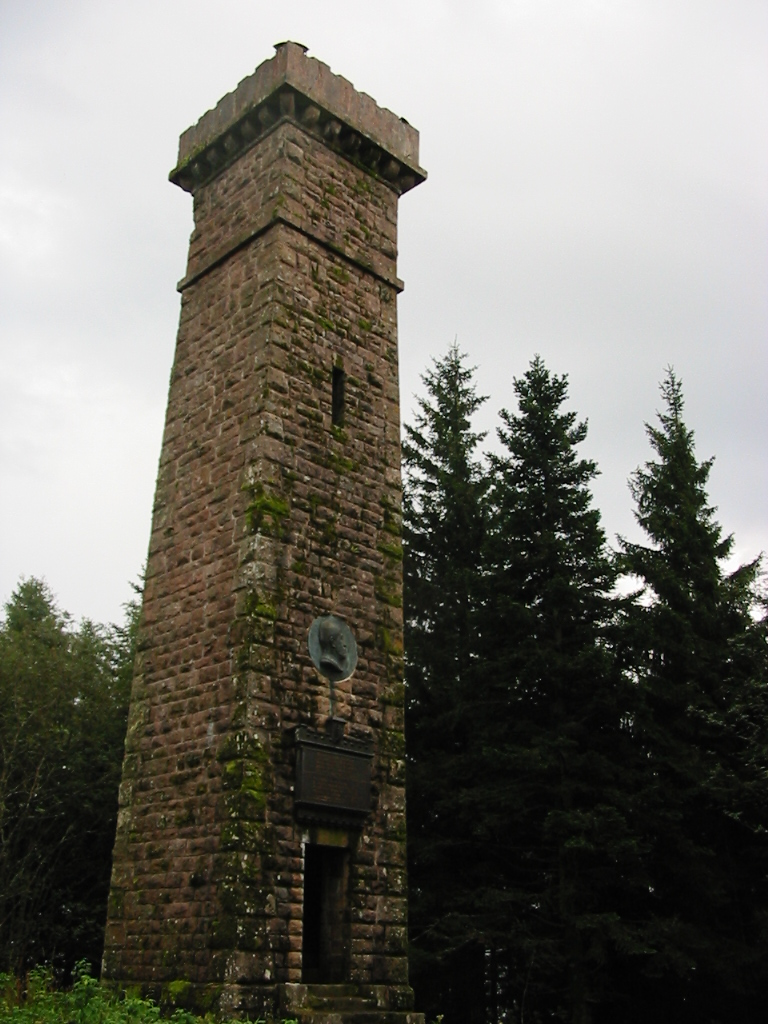
The tour Julius

Climont's panoramic tower, the "Tour Julius", was built in 1897 by the Strasbourg section of the Vosges Club. Mr. Gérardin, owner of the Climont peak, donated the land required for it to be built.

The tower is built in a square neo-medieval style, corbelled at the top and with a southern oriel. It is 17 metres high, and was inaugurated in October 1897 by the German authorities. It has 78 steps and a commemorative plaque in honour of Julius Euting, a famous orientalist and president-founder of the Club vosgien. The tower cost 4,000 German marks to construct.

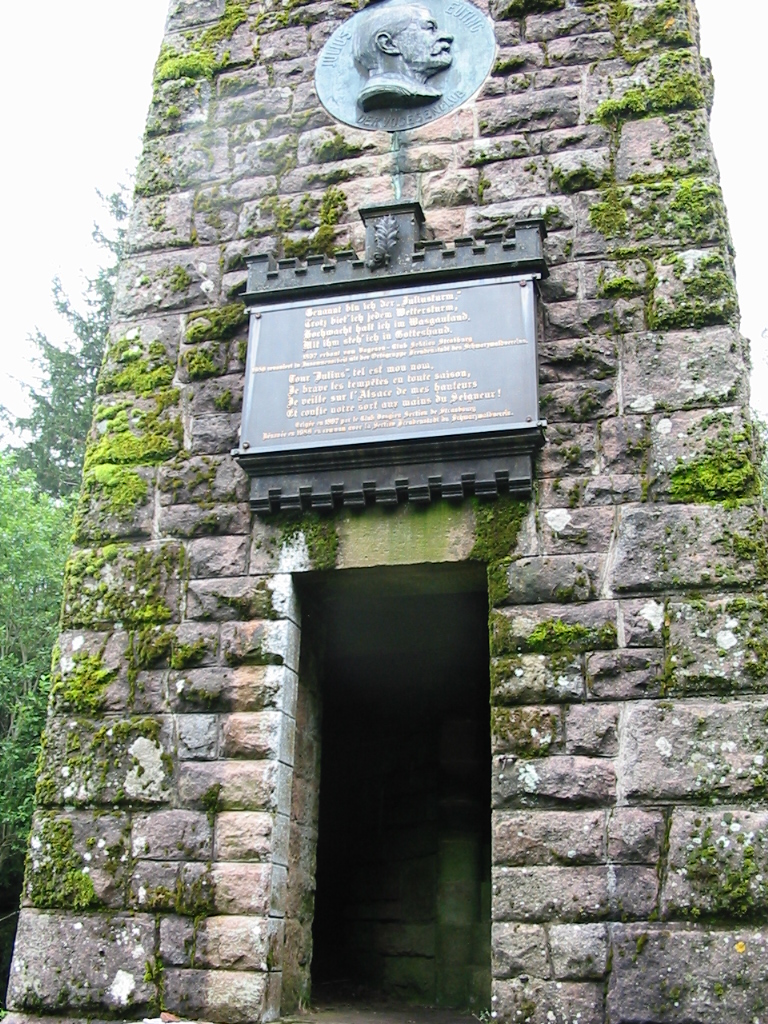
Julius Euting and the quatrains

Beneath the entry portal, under the portrait of Euting, is posted a quatrain in German with a French translation.

Gennant bin ich der "Juliusturm",
Trotz biet'ich jedem Wettersturm;
Hochwacht halt ich im Wasgauland,
Mit ihm steh'ich in Gotteshand.

Tour "Julius", tel est mon nom,
Je brave les tempêtes en toute saison;
Je veille sur les Vosges de mes hauteurs
Et confie notre sort aux mains du Seigneur !

("I am called the Julius tower - I brave storms in all seasons - I watch over the Vosges from my heights, and I entrust our fate to the Lord").

The tower was renovated in 1986.

== Music and folklore ==
It appears that Climont is known in legend for solitary people and for meetings. Without doubt there existed a plethora of songs, whistles and fiddle-pieces dedicated to the beings of Climont. Current folklore realizes this tradition to a greater or lesser extent, or reinvents it wholesale with German tourists in mind. Gérard Durand, in his album La Climontaise published Kobra, based at the Neuve Eglise, attempted to do this, synthesising polka, waltzes and marches. To stay in a more austere or protestant aesthetic, J. S. Bach's six suites for solo cello are good to listen to there.
