= Entre-deux-Eaux =

- Commune
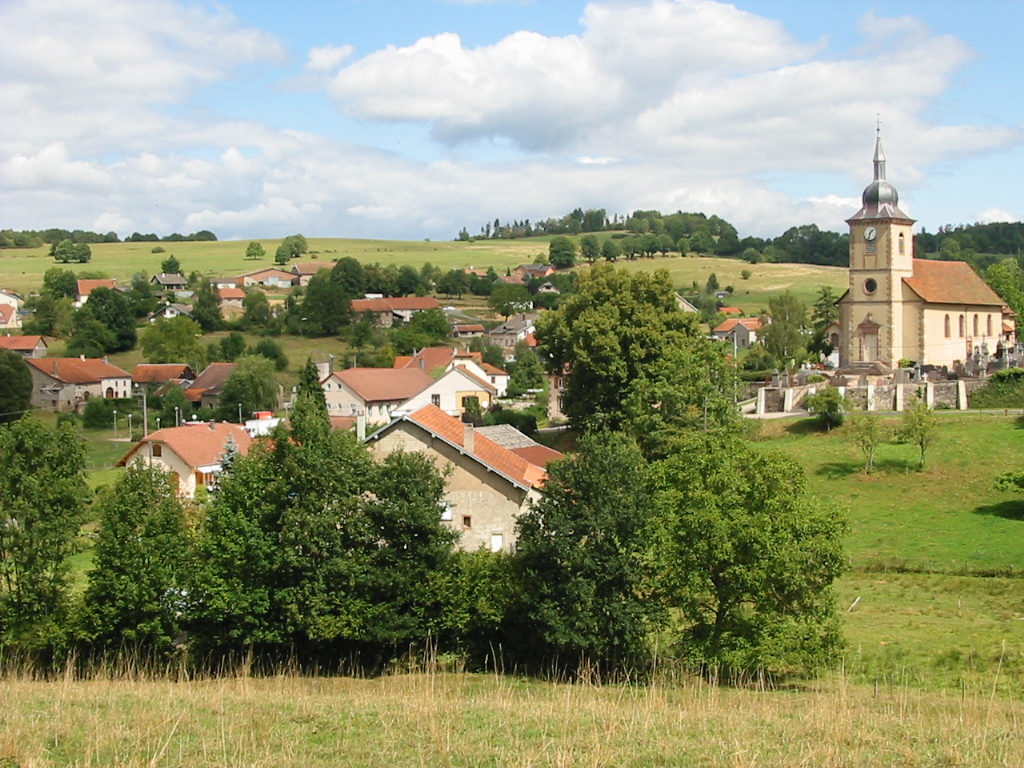
- A general view of Entre-deux-Eaux

- Coat of arms
- Location of Entre-deux-Eaux
- Location within France Location within Grand Est
- Coordinates: 48°13′55″N 6°59′33″E
- Country: France
- Region: Grand Est
- Department: Vosges
- Arrondissement: Saint-Dié-des-Vosges
- Canton: Saint-Dié-des-Vosges-2
- Intercommunality: CA Saint-Dié-des-Vosges

Government
  - Mayor (2020–2026): Dominique Duhaut
- Area^{1}: 8.47 km^{2} (3.27 sq mi)
- Highest elevation: 732 m (2,402 ft)
- Lowest elevation: 372 m (1,220 ft)
- Population (2023): 510
  - Density: 60/km^{2} (160/sq mi)
- Time zone: UTC+01:00 (CET)
  - Summer (DST): UTC+02:00 (CEST)
- INSEE/Postal code: 88159 /88650
- ^{1} French Land Register data, which excludes lakes, ponds, glaciers > 1 km^{2} (0.386 sq mi or 247 acres) and river estuaries.

Entre-deux-Eaux (French pronunciation: [ɑ̃tʁ dø.z‿o]) is a commune in the Vosges department in Grand Est in northeastern France.

== See also ==
- Communes of the Vosges department
