= Raves, Vosges =

Raves
- Commune
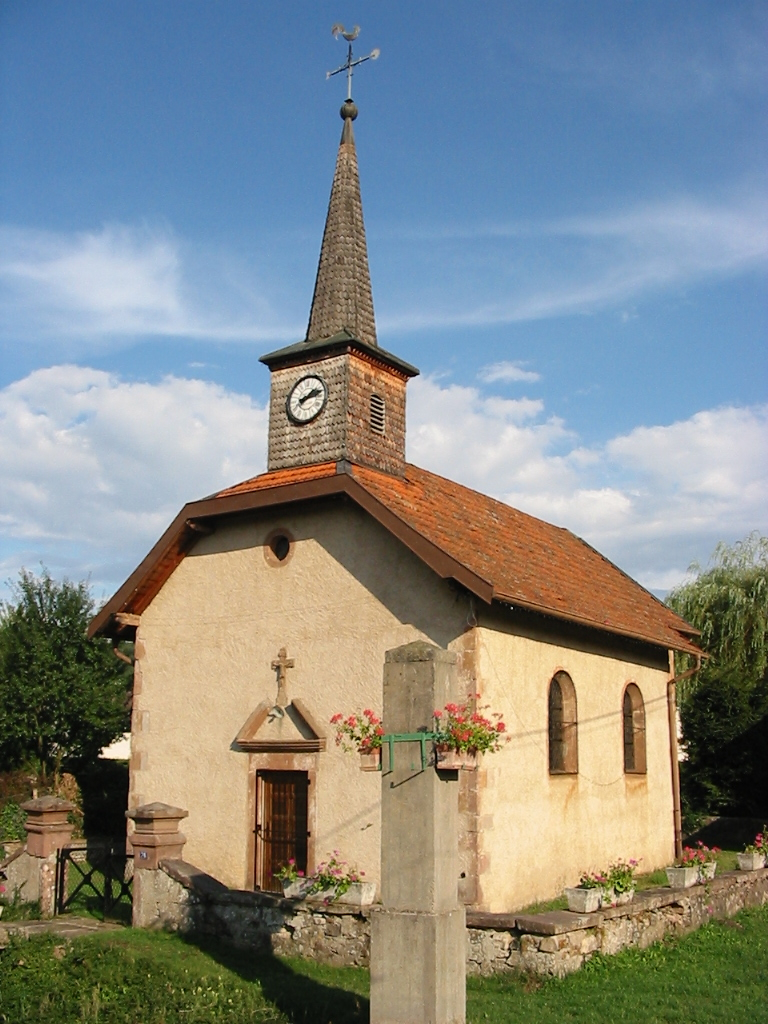
- The chapel in Raves
- Location of Raves
- Location within France Location within Grand Est
- Coordinates: 48°15′49″N 7°03′03″E
- Country: France
- Region: Grand Est
- Department: Vosges
- Arrondissement: Saint-Dié-des-Vosges
- Canton: Saint-Dié-des-Vosges-2
- Intercommunality: CA Saint-Dié-des-Vosges

Government
  - Mayor (2020–2026): Éric Aubert
- Area^{1}: 4.02 km^{2} (1.55 sq mi)
- Elevation: 430 m (1,410 ft)
- Highest elevation: 550 m (1,800 ft)
- Lowest elevation: 367 m (1,204 ft)
- Population (2023): 481
  - Density: 120/km^{2} (310/sq mi)
- Time zone: UTC+01:00 (CET)
  - Summer (DST): UTC+02:00 (CEST)
- INSEE/Postal code: 88375 /88530
- ^{1} French Land Register data, which excludes lakes, ponds, glaciers > 1 km^{2} (0.386 sq mi or 247 acres) and river estuaries.

Raves (French pronunciation: [ʁav]) is a commune in the Vosges department in Grand Est in northeastern France.

== History ==
The earliest surviving record of the village comes from a document of 1329 in which it is called Rayves.

Raves during the ancien regime period fell under the bailiwick of Saint-Dié. There is a small chapel in the village dedicated to St Stephen, but there is no church: for Mass, the commune shares the church at Bertrimoutier. The presbytery and the cemetery are shared in the same way as, until the end of the nineteenth century, was the school.

Under the administrative settlement established after the French Revolution, the commune came under the canton of Bertrimoutier. The present administrative framework is based on the one established some ten years later under Napoleon I.

== See also ==
- Communes of the Vosges department
