= Neuvillers-sur-Fave =

- Commune
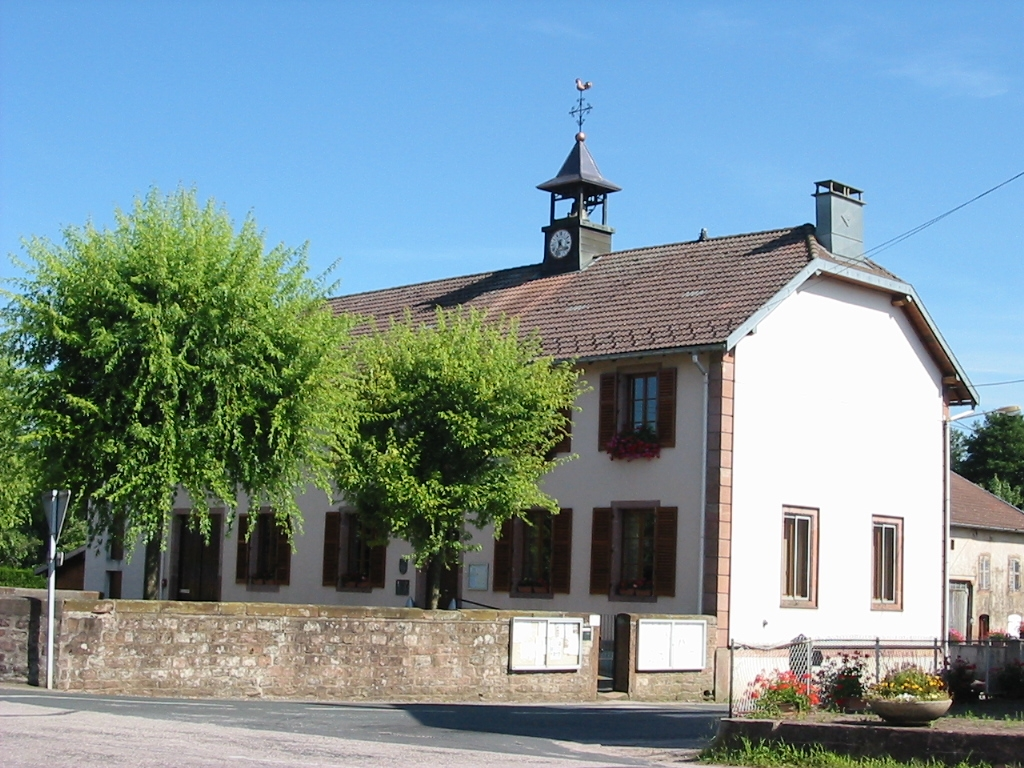
- The town hall in Neuvillers-sur-Fave
- Location of Neuvillers-sur-Fave
- Location within France Location within Grand Est
- Coordinates: 48°16′44″N 7°02′18″E
- Country: France
- Region: Grand Est
- Department: Vosges
- Arrondissement: Saint-Dié-des-Vosges
- Canton: Saint-Dié-des-Vosges-2
- Intercommunality: CA Saint-Dié-des-Vosges

Government
  - Mayor (2020–2026): Daniel Tisserand
- Area^{1}: 5.12 km^{2} (1.98 sq mi)
- Elevation: 380 m (1,250 ft)
- Highest elevation: 524 m (1,719 ft)
- Lowest elevation: 363 m (1,191 ft)
- Population (2023): 357
  - Density: 69.7/km^{2} (181/sq mi)
- Time zone: UTC+01:00 (CET)
  - Summer (DST): UTC+02:00 (CEST)
- INSEE/Postal code: 88326 /88100
- ^{1} French Land Register data, which excludes lakes, ponds, glaciers > 1 km^{2} (0.386 sq mi or 247 acres) and river estuaries.

Neuvillers-sur-Fave is a commune in the Vosges department in Grand Est in northeastern France.

Inhabitants are called Neuvillois.

== Geography ==
The village of Neuvillers is positioned between Frapelle and the little hamlet of Vanifosse on the little river Fave.

== See also ==
- Communes of the Vosges department
