= Nayemont-les-Fosses =

- Commune
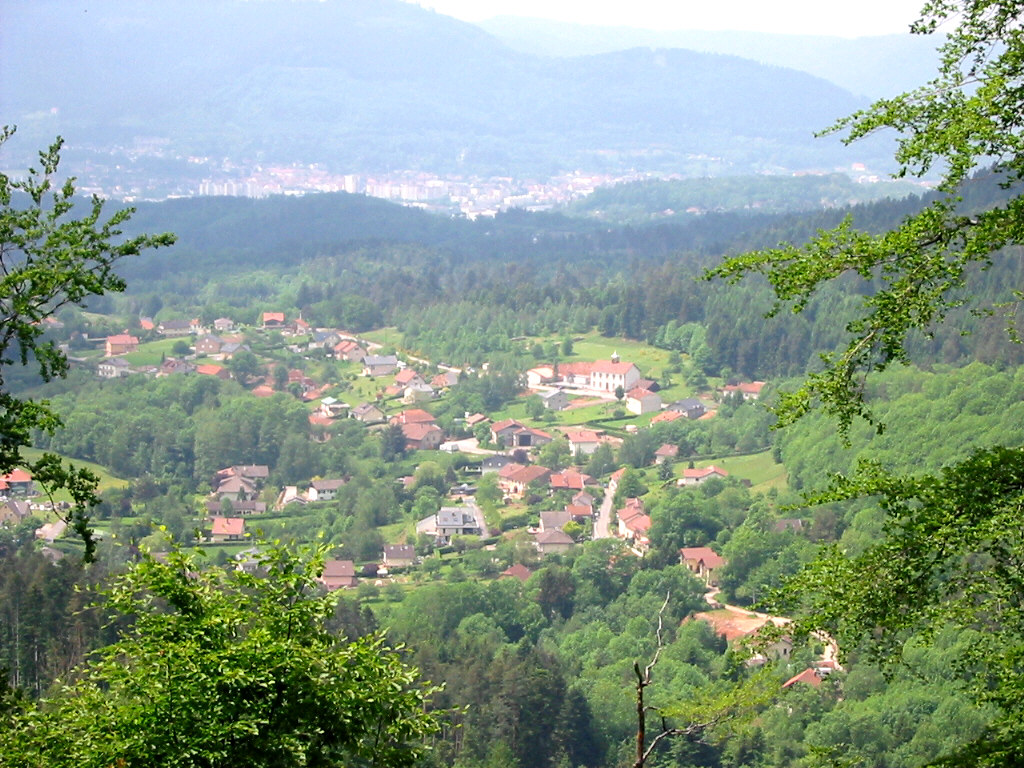
- View of Nayemont-les-Fosses, with Saint-Dié-des-Vosges in the background

- Coat of arms
- Location of Nayemont-les-Fosses
- Location within France Location within Grand Est
- Coordinates: 48°17′51″N 7°00′25″E
- Country: France
- Region: Grand Est
- Department: Vosges
- Arrondissement: Saint-Dié-des-Vosges
- Canton: Saint-Dié-des-Vosges-2
- Intercommunality: CA Saint-Dié-des-Vosges

Government
  - Mayor (2020–2026): Annabelle Soudière
- Area^{1}: 8.91 km^{2} (3.44 sq mi)
- Elevation: 500 m (1,600 ft)
- Highest elevation: 890 m (2,920 ft)
- Lowest elevation: 345 m (1,132 ft)
- Population (2023): 778
  - Density: 87.3/km^{2} (226/sq mi)
- Time zone: UTC+01:00 (CET)
  - Summer (DST): UTC+02:00 (CEST)
- INSEE/Postal code: 88320 /88100
- ^{1} French Land Register data, which excludes lakes, ponds, glaciers > 1 km^{2} (0.386 sq mi or 247 acres) and river estuaries.

Nayemont-les-Fosses (French pronunciation: [nɛmɔ̃ le fos]) is a commune in the Vosges department in Grand Est in northeastern France.

Inhabitants are called Nayemontais.

== Geography ==
The commune is adjacent to Saint-Dié-des-Vosges, on its eastern side, and on the sunny side of the Ormont Hills. The commune's territory extends to the right bank of the little river Fave. The mountain topography enforces a somewhat dispersed layout for the commune's settlements, which include both the village of Nayemont itself and various hamlets such as Brompont, les Basses Fosses, les Hautes Fosses and Menumont.

== History ==
Archaeological discoveries indicate significant human presence here both during the later Neolithic period and subsequently. Presumably the district shared in the switch from a nomadic hunting existence to one involving settlement and agriculture. Presumably, too, the area had its share of fighting and conquest.

During the first millennium, the end of the Gallo-Roman period was accompanied by the disappearance of central authority. It was a troubled period for Lorraine, characterised by wars and the disappearances - presumably following violent assaults - of settled communities. However, the construction on the hill a little to the east of the present day village, of Spitzemberg Castle around 900 indicates an attempt to achieve greater permanence amid the ruins of the Gallo-Roman civilisation. During the Hungarian invasions castles such as this provided a refuge for threatened villagers.

The Lordship of Spitzemberg fell within the Duchy of Lorraine, created in 959 by the German Emperor, Otto I. Lorraine remained subject to the German emperors until the early fifteenth century which ushered in several uncomfortable centuries during which Lorraine would find itself one of several buffer states lodged between the conflicting territorial ambitions of The Empire and of France.

Meanwhile, in the twelfth century the district belonged to the Lords of Paroye until, in 1243, the Dukes of Lorraine themselves acquired the castle, where they installed a garrison: a principal objective of building up and maintaining the castle in this way was the defence of nearby Saint-Dié-des-Vosges to the west. The village o Ayemont (Nayemont) along with the settlements at Les Hautes-Fosses and Les Basse Fosses were part of the domain supporting and dependent of the castle.

The 1550s found the powerful regent Christina, Danish born widow of the former Duke of Lorraine, residing at Spitzemberg Castle. During the time of the dowager duchess Christina, the local inhabitants were granted usage rights to the woods in the lower land around Ayemont which was, at this time, the principal village in the Spitzemberg deanery, with responsibility over the nearby hamlets of Hautes Fosses and Basse Fosses, and under the bailiwick of Saint-Dié. Christina enjoyed her walks and also arranged for the construction and maintenance of a network of forest paths, one of which is still known as "Queen's Path" ("Chemin de la Reine"). The locals were expected to provide some form of military service (guard duty) to the castle, but this could be replaced by a tax in kind, commonly involving rye or oats.

Then as now, the village had no church of its own, being ecclesiastically dependent on the parish of Sainte-Marguerite, a short walk to the south.

Between 1790 and Year X (1801/02) Ayemont, which by now had become Nayemont, was part of the commune of Bertrimoutier.

== See also ==
- Communes of the Vosges department
