= Saulcy-sur-Meurthe =

- Commune
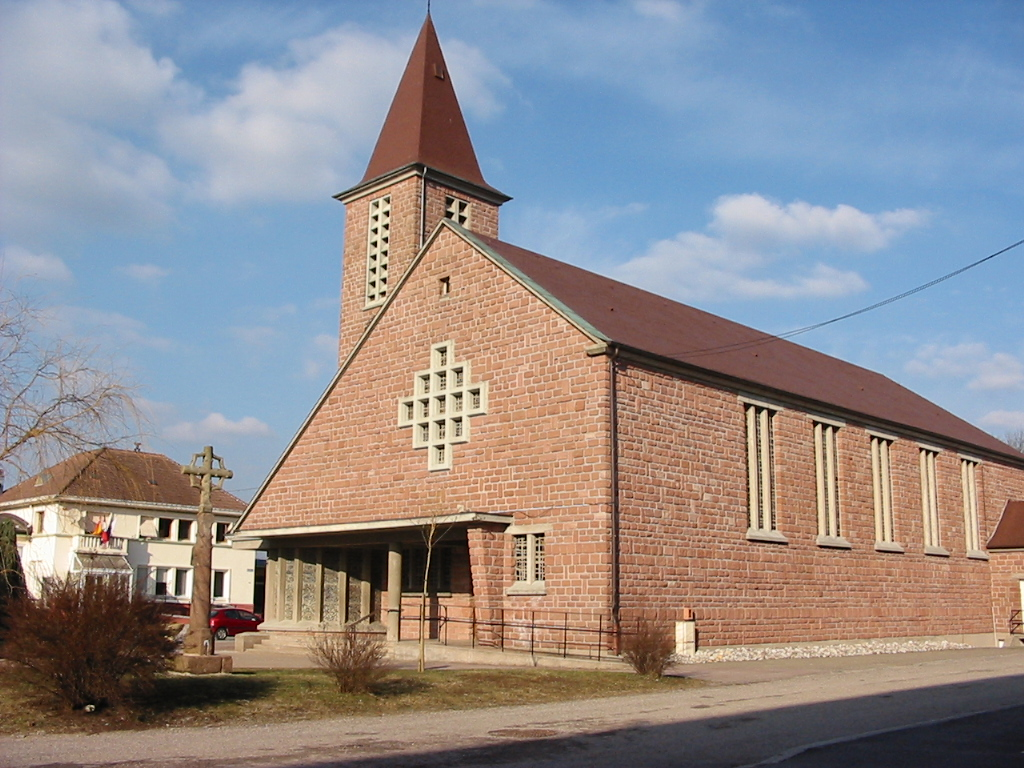
- The church in Saulcy-sur-Meurthe

- Coat of arms
- Location of Saulcy-sur-Meurthe
- Location within France Location within Grand Est
- Coordinates: 48°14′14″N 6°57′38″E
- Country: France
- Region: Grand Est
- Department: Vosges
- Arrondissement: Saint-Dié-des-Vosges
- Canton: Saint-Dié-des-Vosges-2
- Intercommunality: CA Saint-Dié-des-Vosges

Government
  - Mayor (2020–2026): Jacques Jallais
- Area^{1}: 16.37 km^{2} (6.32 sq mi)
- Elevation: 392 m (1,286 ft)
- Highest elevation: 740 m (2,430 ft)
- Lowest elevation: 359 m (1,178 ft)
- Population (2023): 2,319
  - Density: 141.7/km^{2} (366.9/sq mi)
- Time zone: UTC+01:00 (CET)
  - Summer (DST): UTC+02:00 (CEST)
- INSEE/Postal code: 88445 /88580
- ^{1} French Land Register data, which excludes lakes, ponds, glaciers > 1 km^{2} (0.386 sq mi or 247 acres) and river estuaries.

Saulcy-sur-Meurthe (French pronunciation: [so(l)si syʁ mœʁt], literally Saulcy on Meurthe) is a commune in the Vosges department in Grand Est in northeastern France. World War I top scoring flying ace René Fonck was born here in 1894.

== Population ==
Historical population
Year	Pop.	±% p.a.
1968	1,654	—
1975	1,727	+0.62%
1982	1,866	+1.11%
1990	1,898	+0.21%
1999	2,103	+1.15%
2007	2,332	+1.30%
2012	2,363	+0.26%
2017	2,330	−0.28%
2023	2,319	−0.08%
Source: INSEE

== See also ==
- Communes of the Vosges department
