= Lesseux =

- Commune
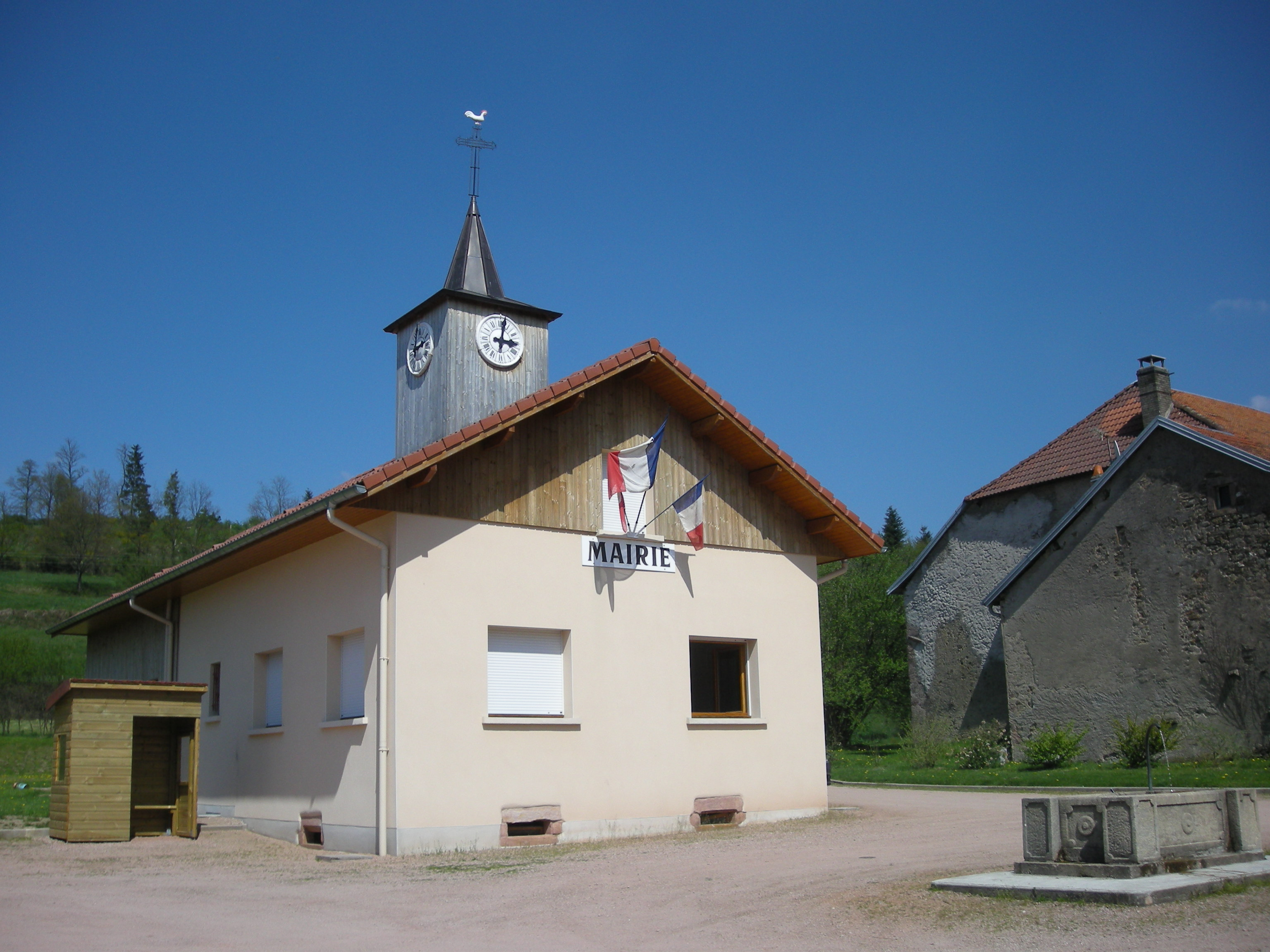
- The town hall in Lesseux
- Location of Lesseux
- Location within France Location within Grand Est
- Coordinates: 48°17′09″N 7°05′01″E
- Country: France
- Region: Grand Est
- Department: Vosges
- Arrondissement: Saint-Dié-des-Vosges
- Canton: Saint-Dié-des-Vosges-2
- Intercommunality: CA Saint-Dié-des-Vosges

Government
  - Mayor (2020–2026): Raoul Partage
- Area^{1}: 2.94 km^{2} (1.14 sq mi)
- Highest elevation: 660 m (2,170 ft)
- Lowest elevation: 382 m (1,253 ft)
- Population (2023): 137
  - Density: 46.6/km^{2} (121/sq mi)
- Time zone: UTC+01:00 (CET)
  - Summer (DST): UTC+02:00 (CEST)
- INSEE/Postal code: 88268 /88490
- ^{1} French Land Register data, which excludes lakes, ponds, glaciers > 1 km^{2} (0.386 sq mi or 247 acres) and river estuaries.

Lesseux (French pronunciation: [lɛsø]) is a commune in the Vosges department in Grand Est in northeastern France.

== See also ==
- Communes of the Vosges department
