= Coinches =

- Commune
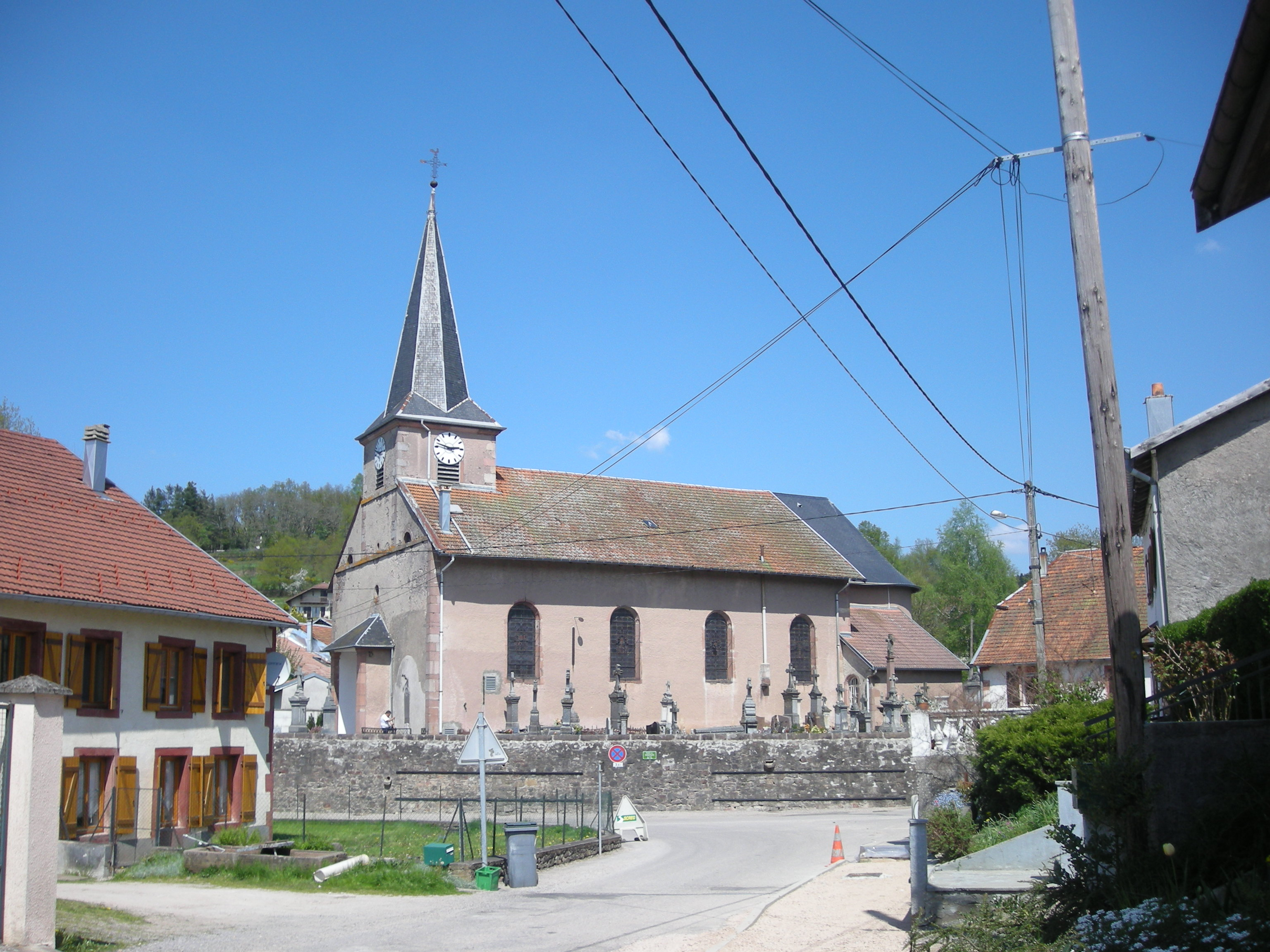
- The church in Coinches
- Location of Coinches
- Location within France Location within Grand Est
- Coordinates: 48°15′11″N 7°01′23″E
- Country: France
- Region: Grand Est
- Department: Vosges
- Arrondissement: Saint-Dié-des-Vosges
- Canton: Saint-Dié-des-Vosges-2
- Intercommunality: CA Saint-Dié-des-Vosges

Government
  - Mayor (2020–2026): Anthony Lemaire
- Area^{1}: 5.69 km^{2} (2.20 sq mi)
- Elevation: 379 m (1,243 ft)
- Highest elevation: 720 m (2,360 ft)
- Lowest elevation: 366 m (1,201 ft)
- Population (2023): 346
  - Density: 60.8/km^{2} (157/sq mi)
- Time zone: UTC+01:00 (CET)
  - Summer (DST): UTC+02:00 (CEST)
- INSEE/Postal code: 88111 /88100
- ^{1} French Land Register data, which excludes lakes, ponds, glaciers > 1 km^{2} (0.386 sq mi or 247 acres) and river estuaries.

Coinches (French pronunciation: [kwɛ̃ʃ]) is a commune in the Vosges department in Grand Est in northeastern France.

== See also ==
- Communes of the Vosges department
