= Combrimont =

- Commune
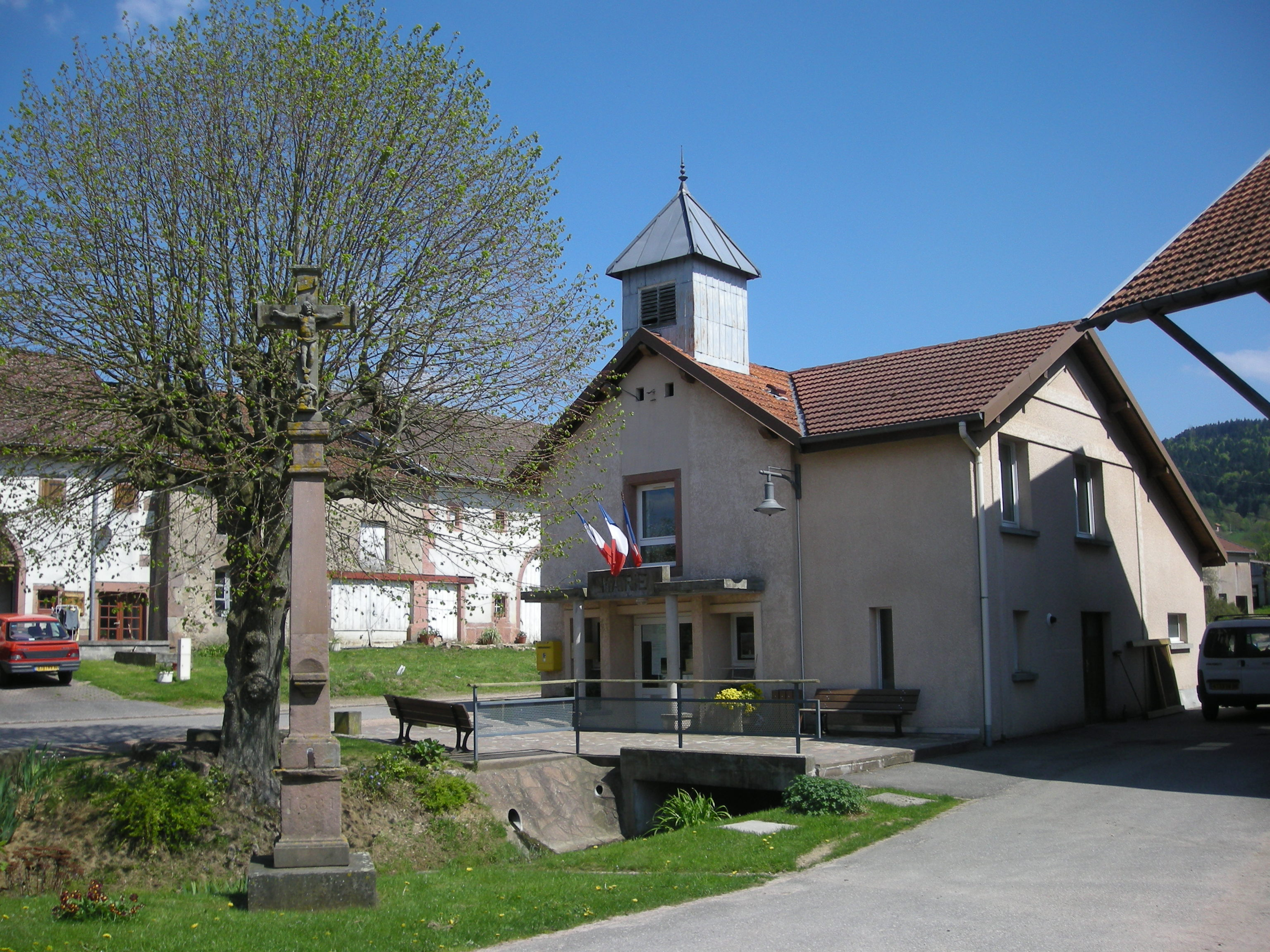
- Town hall
- Location of Combrimont
- Location within France Location within Grand Est
- Coordinates: 48°16′36″N 7°03′53″E
- Country: France
- Region: Grand Est
- Department: Vosges
- Arrondissement: Saint-Dié-des-Vosges
- Canton: Saint-Dié-des-Vosges-2
- Intercommunality: CA Saint-Dié-des-Vosges

Government
  - Mayor (2020–2026): Annie-Marie Barth
- Area^{1}: 5.21 km^{2} (2.01 sq mi)
- Elevation: 392 m (1,286 ft)
- Highest elevation: 730 m (2,400 ft)
- Lowest elevation: 372 m (1,220 ft)
- Population (2023): 136
  - Density: 26.1/km^{2} (67.6/sq mi)
- Time zone: UTC+01:00 (CET)
  - Summer (DST): UTC+02:00 (CEST)
- INSEE/Postal code: 88113 /88490
- ^{1} French Land Register data, which excludes lakes, ponds, glaciers > 1 km^{2} (0.386 sq mi or 247 acres) and river estuaries.

Combrimont (French pronunciation: [kɔ̃bʁimɔ̃]) is a commune in the Vosges department in Grand Est in northeastern France.

== See also ==
- Communes of the Vosges department
