= Wisembach =

- Commune
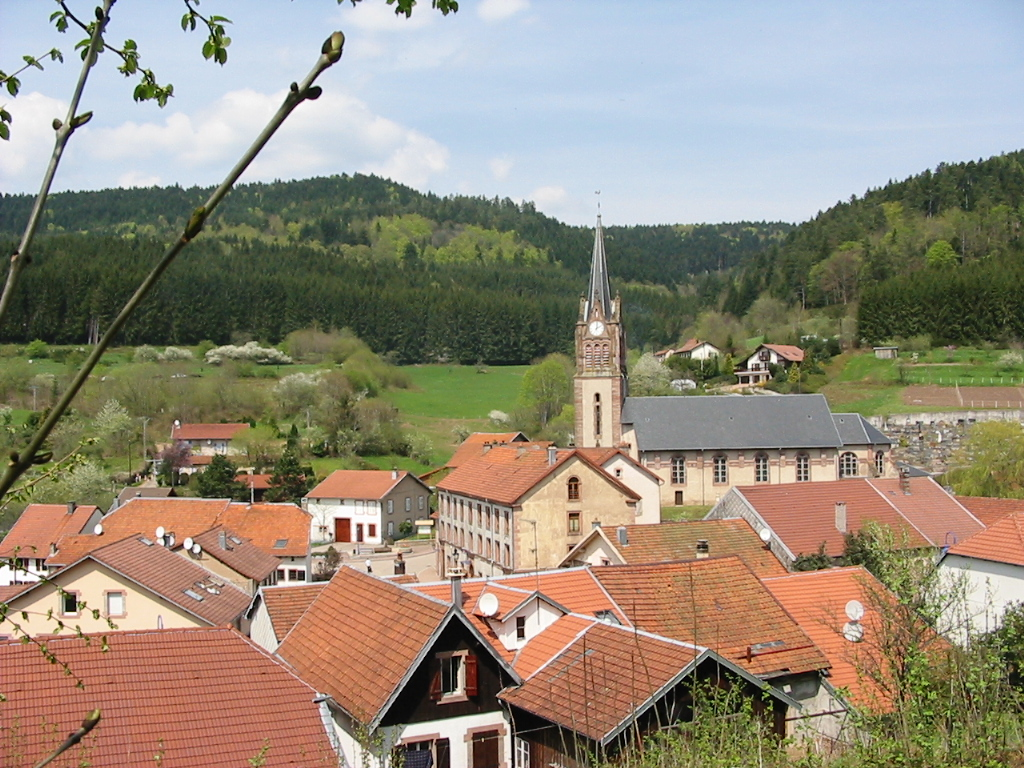
- The church and surroundings in Wisembach

- Coat of arms
- Location of Wisembach
- Location within France Location within Grand Est
- Coordinates: 48°15′29″N 7°06′25″E
- Country: France
- Region: Grand Est
- Department: Vosges
- Arrondissement: Saint-Dié-des-Vosges
- Canton: Saint-Dié-des-Vosges-2
- Intercommunality: Saint-Dié-des-Vosges

Government
  - Mayor (2020–2026): Rachel Voinson
- Area^{1}: 11.3 km^{2} (4.4 sq mi)
- Elevation: 500 m (1,600 ft)
- Highest elevation: 982 m (3,222 ft)
- Lowest elevation: 420 m (1,380 ft)
- Population (2023): 427
  - Density: 37.8/km^{2} (97.9/sq mi)
- Time zone: UTC+01:00 (CET)
  - Summer (DST): UTC+02:00 (CEST)
- INSEE/Postal code: 88526 /88520
- ^{1} French Land Register data, which excludes lakes, ponds, glaciers > 1 km^{2} (0.386 sq mi or 247 acres) and river estuaries.

Wisembach is a commune in the Vosges department in Grand Est in northeastern France.

== Etymology ==
The toponym Wisembach is of Germanic origin, deriving from High German wisa (cognate to modern German Wiese), denoting meadow. The Germanic hydronym *-bak(i) entered the French language via High German, and took on two forms: the Germanic form -bach and Romantic -bais.

== Population ==
Historical population
Year	Pop.	±% p.a.
1968	381	—
1975	363	−0.69%
1982	356	−0.28%
1990	370	+0.48%
1999	428	+1.63%
2007	402	−0.78%
2012	406	+0.20%
2017	409	+0.15%
2023	427	+0.72%
Source: INSEE

== See also ==
- Communes of the Vosges department
