= Gemaingoutte =

Commune in Grand Est, France

- Commune
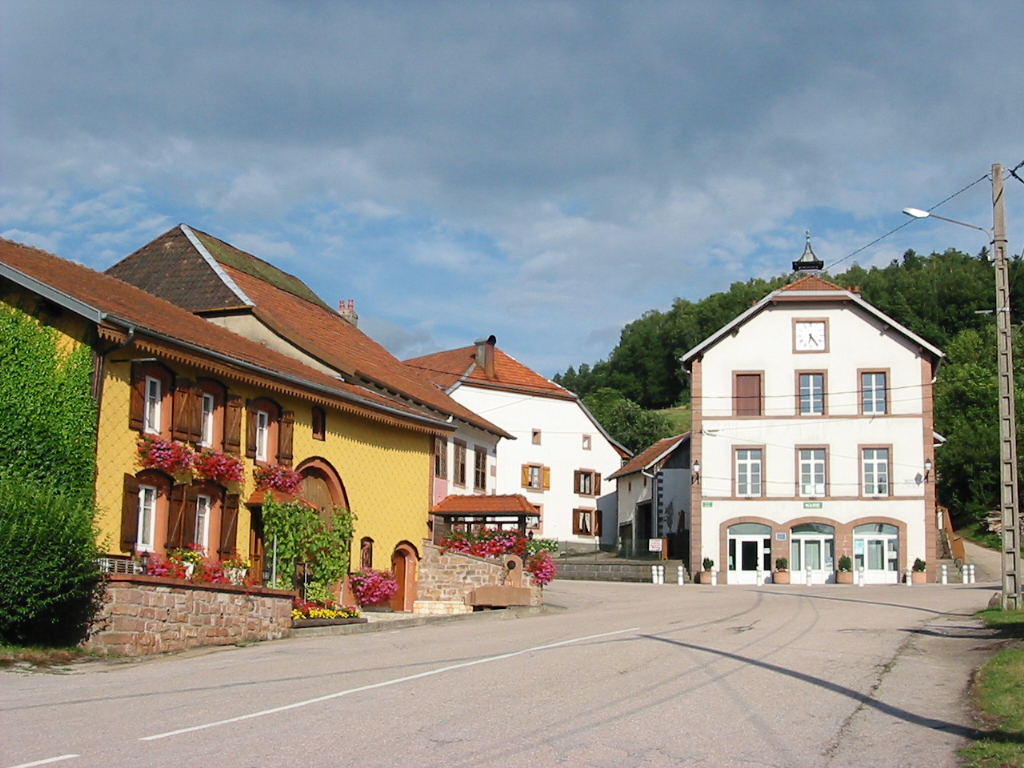
- Town hall
- Location of Gemaingoutte
- Location within France Location within Grand Est
- Coordinates: 48°15′16″N 7°05′11″E
- Country: France
- Region: Grand Est
- Department: Vosges
- Arrondissement: Saint-Dié-des-Vosges
- Canton: Saint-Dié-des-Vosges-2
- Intercommunality: CA Saint-Dié-des-Vosges

Government
  - Mayor (2020–2026): Jacques Rouyer
- Area^{1}: 3.9 km^{2} (1.5 sq mi)
- Elevation: 450 m (1,480 ft)
- Highest elevation: 986 m (3,235 ft)
- Lowest elevation: 424 m (1,391 ft)
- Population (2023): 150
  - Density: 38/km^{2} (100/sq mi)
- Time zone: UTC+01:00 (CET)
  - Summer (DST): UTC+02:00 (CEST)
- INSEE/Postal code: 88193 /88520
- ^{1} French Land Register data, which excludes lakes, ponds, glaciers > 1 km^{2} (0.386 sq mi or 247 acres) and river estuaries.

Gemaingoutte (French pronunciation: [ʒəmɛ̃ɡut]) is a commune in the Vosges department in Grand Est in northeastern France.

== See also ==
- Communes of the Vosges department
