= La Petite-Fosse =

- Commune
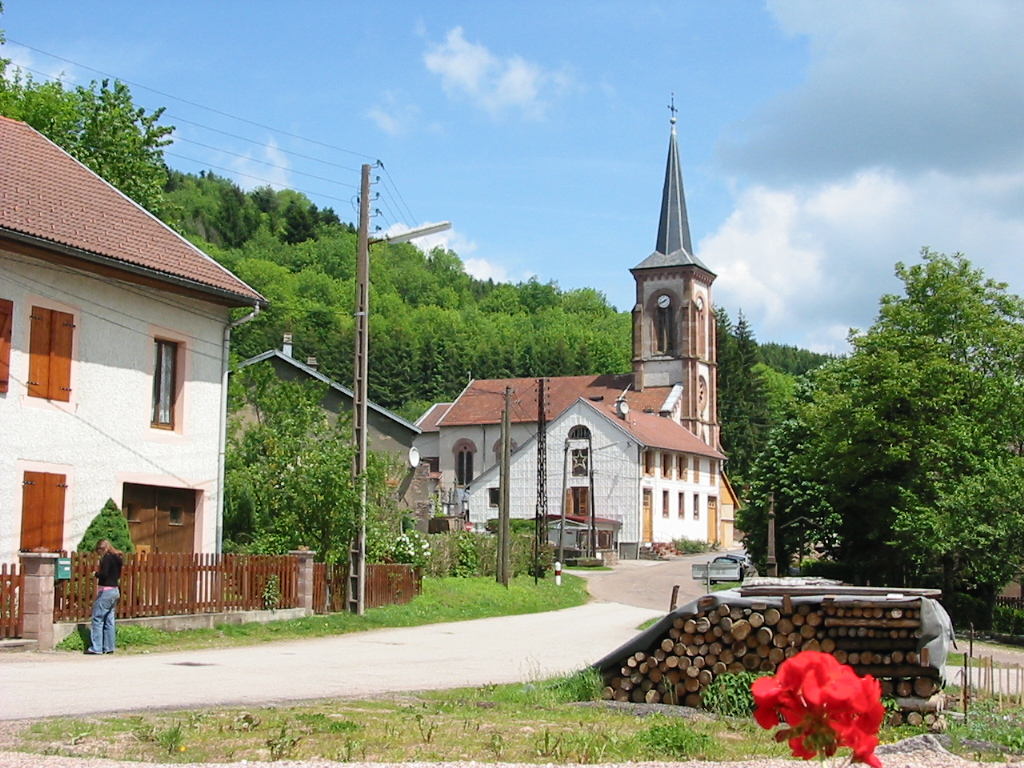
- The church in La Petite-Fosse
- Location of La Petite-Fosse
- Location within France Location within Grand Est
- Coordinates: 48°19′16″N 7°03′14″E
- Country: France
- Region: Grand Est
- Department: Vosges
- Arrondissement: Saint-Dié-des-Vosges
- Canton: Saint-Dié-des-Vosges-2
- Intercommunality: CA Saint-Dié-des-Vosges

Government
  - Mayor (2020–2026): Jean-Marie Cuny
- Area^{1}: 5.04 km^{2} (1.95 sq mi)
- Elevation: 515 m (1,690 ft)
- Highest elevation: 870 m (2,850 ft)
- Lowest elevation: 440 m (1,440 ft)
- Population (2023): 91
  - Density: 18/km^{2} (47/sq mi)
- Time zone: UTC+01:00 (CET)
  - Summer (DST): UTC+02:00 (CEST)
- INSEE/Postal code: 88345 /88490
- ^{1} French Land Register data, which excludes lakes, ponds, glaciers > 1 km^{2} (0.386 sq mi or 247 acres) and river estuaries.

La Petite-Fosse (French pronunciation: [la pətit fos]) is a commune in the Vosges department in Grand Est in northeastern France. As of 2022 the village has 84 inhabitants.

== History ==
During World War I, the western front of the war ran through the village. Notably this battle was fought in large part over the Spitzenberg mountain. The village was awarded the Croix de Guerre on October 21, 1920.

== Sights ==
- Saint-Joseph church built in 1864
- Saint-Gondelbert chapel
- Ruins of Château de Spitzemberg

== See also ==
- Communes of the Vosges department
