= Le Beulay =

- Commune
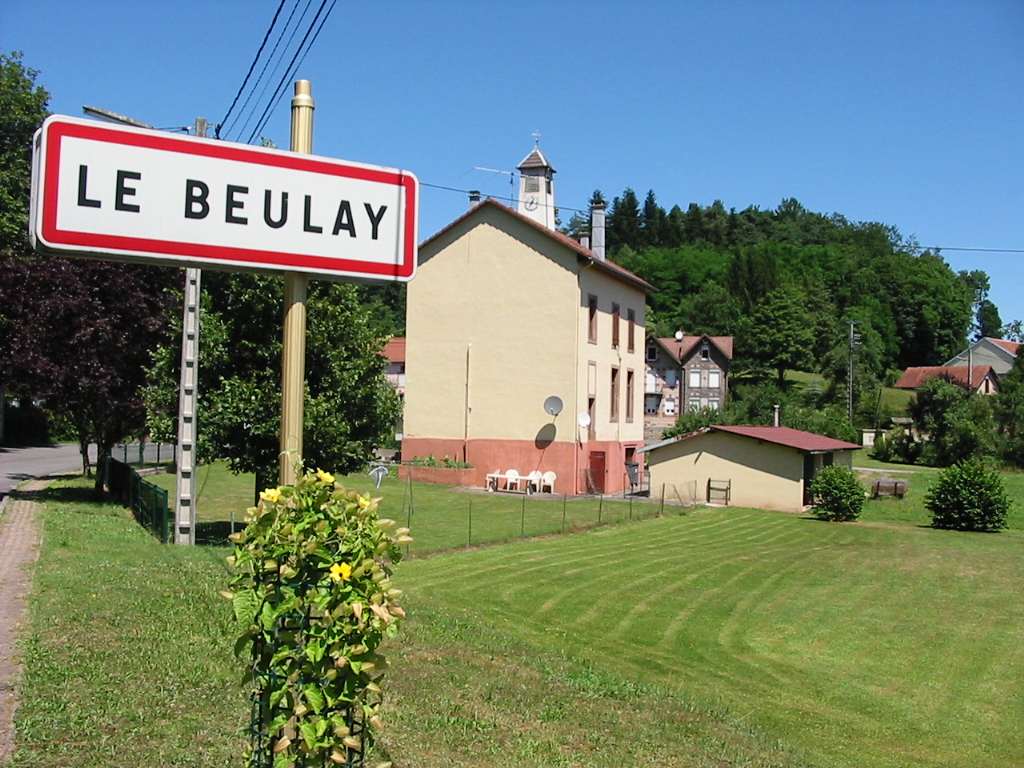
- Town hall
- Location of Le Beulay
- Location within France Location within Grand Est
- Coordinates: 48°18′06″N 7°04′22″E
- Country: France
- Region: Grand Est
- Department: Vosges
- Arrondissement: Saint-Dié-des-Vosges
- Canton: Saint-Dié-des-Vosges-2
- Intercommunality: CA Saint-Dié-des-Vosges

Government
  - Mayor (2020–2026): Jean-Marie Sobolewski
- Area^{1}: 2.4 km^{2} (0.93 sq mi)
- Elevation: 396 m (1,299 ft)
- Highest elevation: 570 m (1,870 ft)
- Lowest elevation: 386 m (1,266 ft)
- Population (2023): 88
  - Density: 37/km^{2} (95/sq mi)
- Time zone: UTC+01:00 (CET)
  - Summer (DST): UTC+02:00 (CEST)
- INSEE/Postal code: 88057 /88490
- ^{1} French Land Register data, which excludes lakes, ponds, glaciers > 1 km^{2} (0.386 sq mi or 247 acres) and river estuaries.

Le Beulay (French pronunciation: [lə bœlɛ]) is a commune in the Vosges department in Grand Est in northeastern France.

== See also ==
- Communes of the Vosges department
