= Lubine =

- Commune
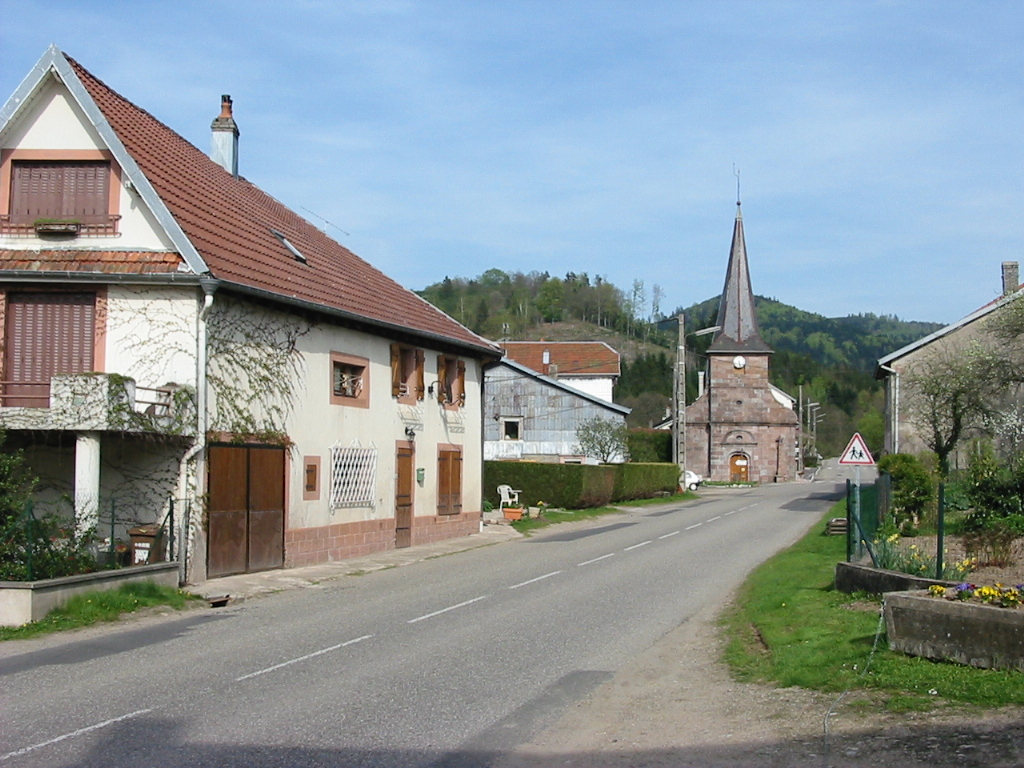
- The church and surroundings in Lubine

- Coat of arms
- Location of Lubine
- Location within France Location within Grand Est
- Coordinates: 48°19′03″N 7°09′09″E
- Country: France
- Region: Grand Est
- Department: Vosges
- Arrondissement: Saint-Dié-des-Vosges
- Canton: Saint-Dié-des-Vosges-2
- Intercommunality: CA Saint-Dié-des-Vosges

Government
  - Mayor (2020–2026): Laurent Parisse
- Area^{1}: 14.85 km^{2} (5.73 sq mi)
- Elevation: 520 m (1,710 ft)
- Highest elevation: 851 m (2,792 ft)
- Lowest elevation: 448 m (1,470 ft)
- Population (2023): 245
  - Density: 16.5/km^{2} (42.7/sq mi)
- Time zone: UTC+01:00 (CET)
  - Summer (DST): UTC+02:00 (CEST)
- INSEE/Postal code: 88275 /88490
- ^{1} French Land Register data, which excludes lakes, ponds, glaciers > 1 km^{2} (0.386 sq mi or 247 acres) and river estuaries.

Lubine (French pronunciation: [lybin]) is a commune in the Vosges department in Grand Est in northeastern France.

== See also ==
- Communes of the Vosges department
