= Ban-de-Laveline =

- Commune
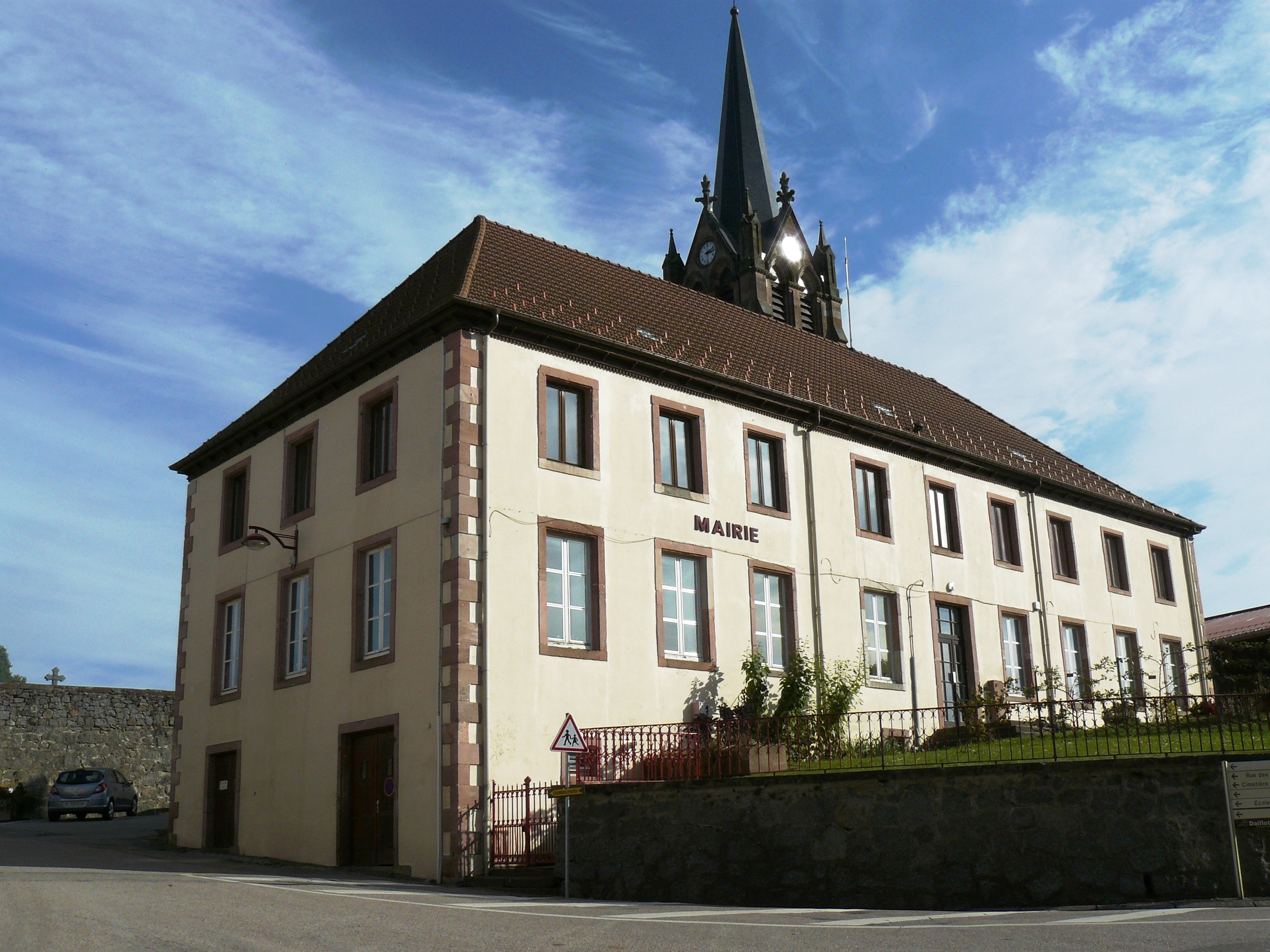
- The town hall in Ban-de-Laveline

- Coat of arms
- Location of Ban-de-Laveline
- Location within France Location within Grand Est
- Coordinates: 48°14′42″N 7°03′57″E
- Country: France
- Region: Grand Est
- Department: Vosges
- Arrondissement: Saint-Dié-des-Vosges
- Canton: Saint-Dié-des-Vosges-2
- Intercommunality: CA Saint-Dié-des-Vosges

Government
  - Mayor (2020–2026): Stéphane Demange
- Area^{1}: 26.45 km^{2} (10.21 sq mi)
- Elevation: 425 m (1,394 ft)
- Highest elevation: 1,031 m (3,383 ft)
- Lowest elevation: 403 m (1,322 ft)
- Population (2023): 1,148
  - Density: 43.40/km^{2} (112.4/sq mi)
- Time zone: UTC+01:00 (CET)
  - Summer (DST): UTC+02:00 (CEST)
- INSEE/Postal code: 88032 /88520
- Website: www.mairie-bandelaveline.fr
- ^{1} French Land Register data, which excludes lakes, ponds, glaciers > 1 km^{2} (0.386 sq mi or 247 acres) and river estuaries.

Ban-de-Laveline (French pronunciation: [bɑ̃ də lavlin]) is a commune in the Vosges department in Grand Est in northeastern France.

== See also ==
- Communes of the Vosges department
