= Canton of Saint-Dié-des-Vosges-2 =

Coordinates: 48.29°N 6.96°E

Canton de Saint-Dié-des-Vosges-2
- Canton
- Interactive map of Canton de Saint-Dié-des-Vosges-2
- Country: France
- Region: Grand Est
- Department: Vosges
- No. of communes: {{{nbcomm}}}
- Area: 96 km^{2} (37 sq mi)
- Population (2023): 22,875
  - Density: 240/km^{2} (620/sq mi)
- INSEE code: 8814

The canton of Saint-Dié-des-Vosges-2 is an administrative division of the Vosges department, in northeastern France. It was created at the French canton reorganisation which came into effect in March 2015. Its seat is in Saint-Dié-des-Vosges.

It consists of the following communes:

1. Ban-de-Laveline
2. Bertrimoutier
3. Le Beulay
4. Coinches
5. Combrimont
6. La Croix-aux-Mines
7. Entre-deux-Eaux
8. Frapelle
9. Gemaingoutte
10. La Grande-Fosse
11. Lesseux
12. Lubine
13. Lusse
14. Mandray
15. Nayemont-les-Fosses
16. Neuvillers-sur-Fave
17. Pair-et-Grandrupt
18. La Petite-Fosse
19. Provenchères-et-Colroy
20. Raves
21. Remomeix
22. Saint-Dié-des-Vosges (partly)
23. Sainte-Marguerite
24. Saint-Léonard
25. Saulcy-sur-Meurthe
26. Wisembach
