= Lusse =

- Commune
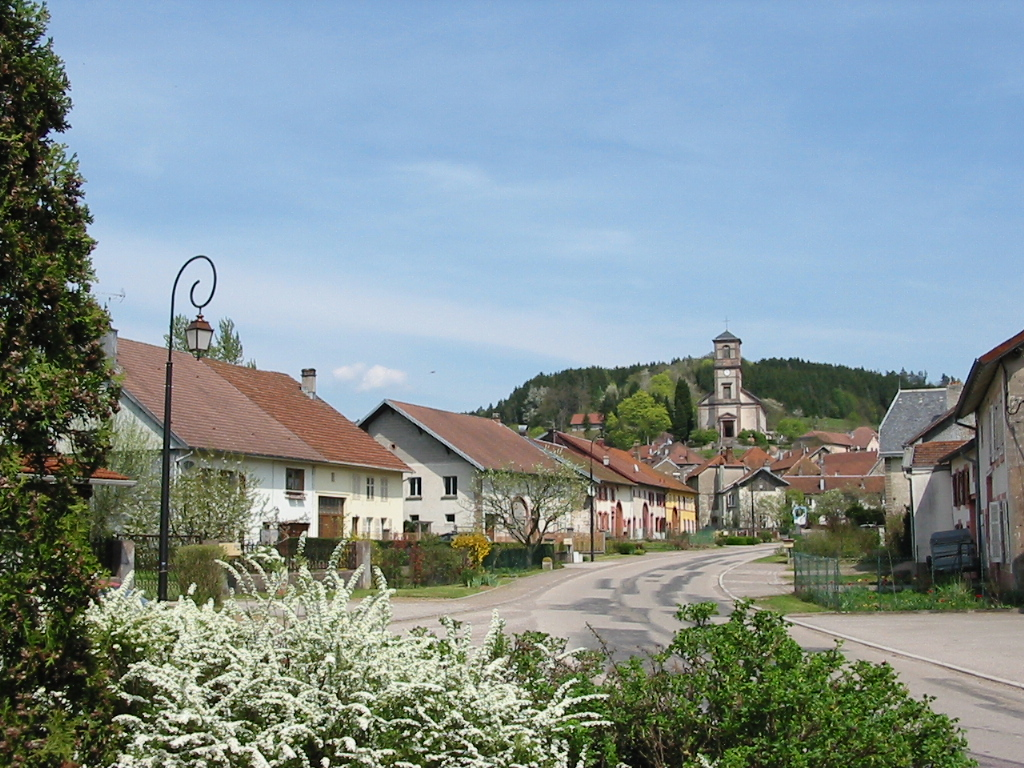
- The main road in Lusse
- Location of Lusse
- Location within France Location within Grand Est
- Coordinates: 48°17′35″N 7°06′13″E
- Country: France
- Region: Grand Est
- Department: Vosges
- Arrondissement: Saint-Dié-des-Vosges
- Canton: Saint-Dié-des-Vosges-2
- Intercommunality: CA Saint-Dié-des-Vosges

Government
  - Mayor (2020–2026): Gérard Roudot
- Area^{1}: 19.49 km^{2} (7.53 sq mi)
- Elevation: 430 m (1,410 ft)
- Highest elevation: 950 m (3,120 ft)
- Lowest elevation: 390 m (1,280 ft)
- Population (2023): 354
  - Density: 18.2/km^{2} (47.0/sq mi)
- Time zone: UTC+01:00 (CET)
  - Summer (DST): UTC+02:00 (CEST)
- INSEE/Postal code: 88276 /88490
- ^{1} French Land Register data, which excludes lakes, ponds, glaciers > 1 km^{2} (0.386 sq mi or 247 acres) and river estuaries.

Lusse (French pronunciation: [lys]) is a commune in the Vosges department in Grand Est in northeastern France.

== See also ==
- Communes of the Vosges department
