= Sainte-Marguerite, Vosges =

Sainte-Marguerite
- Commune
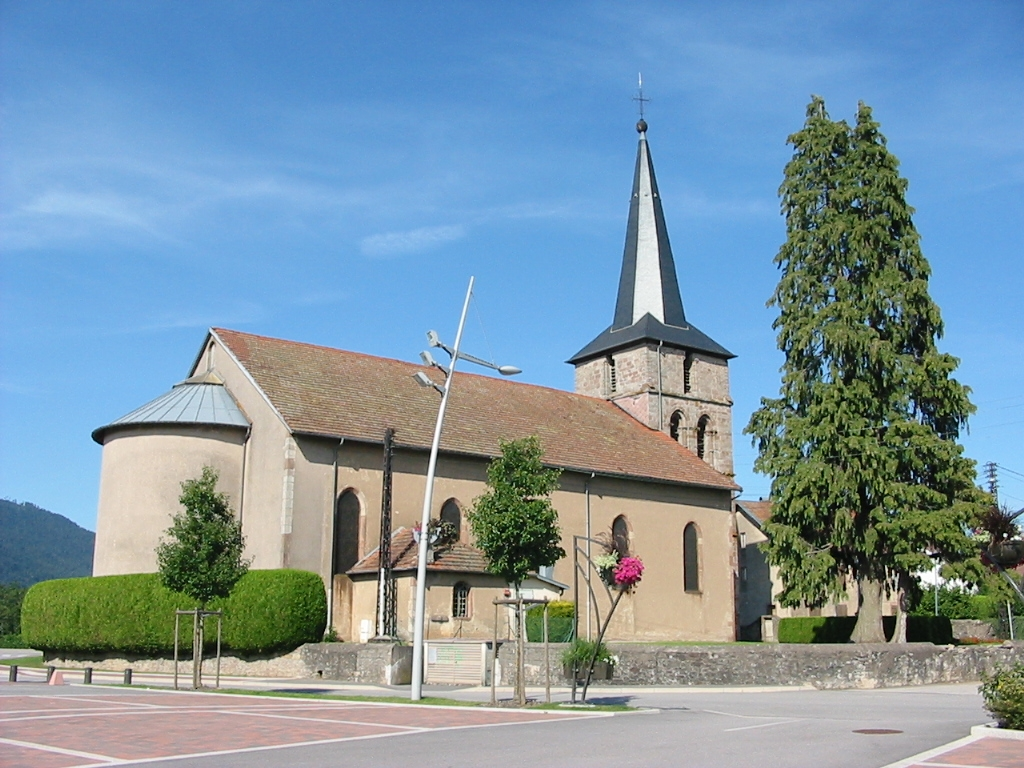
- Sainte-Marguerite

- Coat of arms
- Location of Sainte-Marguerite
- Location within France Location within Grand Est
- Coordinates: 48°16′11″N 6°58′38″E
- Country: France
- Region: Grand Est
- Department: Vosges
- Arrondissement: Saint-Dié-des-Vosges
- Canton: Saint-Dié-des-Vosges-2
- Intercommunality: CA Saint-Dié-des-Vosges

Government
  - Mayor (2020–2026): André Boulangeot
- Area^{1}: 5.55 km^{2} (2.14 sq mi)
- Elevation: 360 m (1,180 ft)
- Highest elevation: 426 m (1,398 ft)
- Lowest elevation: 344 m (1,129 ft)
- Population (2023): 2,234
  - Density: 403/km^{2} (1,040/sq mi)
- Time zone: UTC+01:00 (CET)
  - Summer (DST): UTC+02:00 (CEST)
- INSEE/Postal code: 88424 /88100
- ^{1} French Land Register data, which excludes lakes, ponds, glaciers > 1 km^{2} (0.386 sq mi or 247 acres) and river estuaries.

Sainte-Marguerite (French pronunciation: [sɛ̃t maʁɡərit]) is a commune in the Vosges department in Grand Est in northeastern France.

== Population ==
Historical population
Year	Pop.	±% p.a.
1968	1,524	—
1975	1,542	+0.17%
1982	1,547	+0.05%
1990	2,105	+3.93%
1999	2,259	+0.79%
2007	2,415	+0.84%
2012	2,402	−0.11%
2017	2,319	−0.70%
2023	2,234	−0.62%
Source: INSEE

== Notable people ==
- Léonie de Bazelaire (1857-1926), artist

== See also ==
- Communes of the Vosges department
