= Remomeix =

- Commune
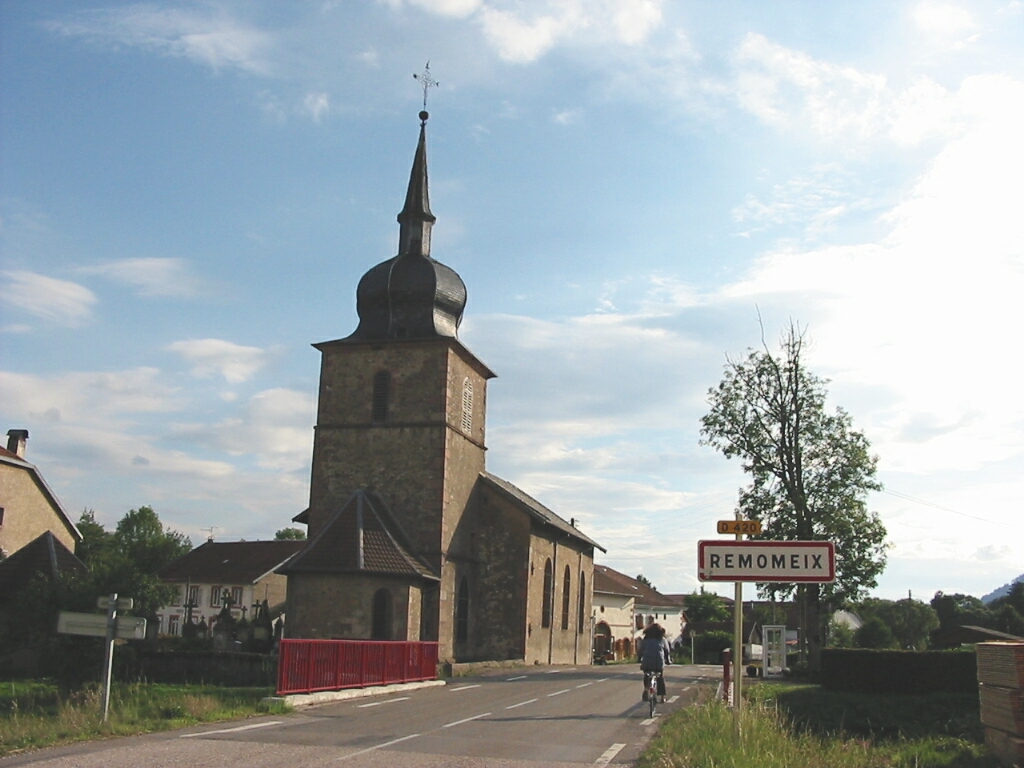
- The church in Remomeix
- Location of Remomeix
- Location within France Location within Grand Est
- Coordinates: 48°16′11″N 7°00′07″E
- Country: France
- Region: Grand Est
- Department: Vosges
- Arrondissement: Saint-Dié-des-Vosges
- Canton: Saint-Dié-des-Vosges-2
- Intercommunality: CA Saint-Dié-des-Vosges

Government
  - Mayor (2020–2026): David Laxenaire
- Area^{1}: 4.73 km^{2} (1.83 sq mi)
- Highest elevation: 480 m (1,570 ft)
- Lowest elevation: 352 m (1,155 ft)
- Population (2023): 428
  - Density: 90.5/km^{2} (234/sq mi)
- Time zone: UTC+01:00 (CET)
  - Summer (DST): UTC+02:00 (CEST)
- INSEE/Postal code: 88386 /88100
- ^{1} French Land Register data, which excludes lakes, ponds, glaciers > 1 km^{2} (0.386 sq mi or 247 acres) and river estuaries.

Remomeix (French pronunciation: [ʁəmɔmɛks]) is a commune in the Vosges department in Grand Est in northeastern France.

== See also ==
- Communes of the Vosges department
