= Bertrimoutier =

- Commune
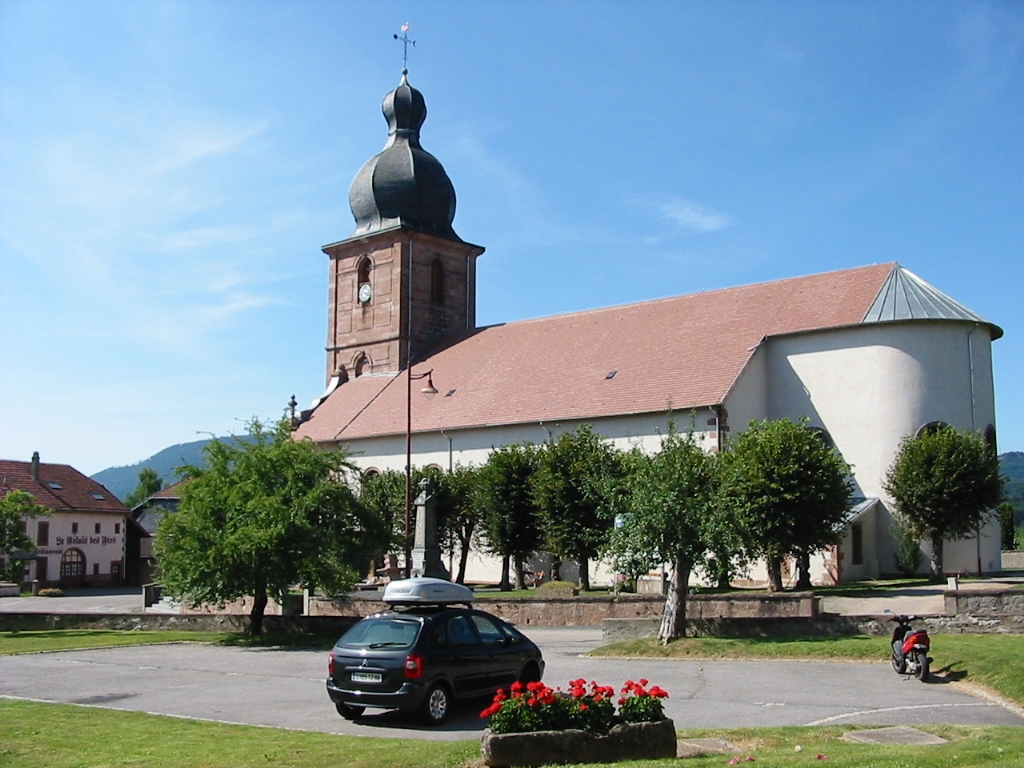
- Saint-Jacques-le-Majeur
- Location of Bertrimoutier
- Location within France Location within Grand Est
- Coordinates: 48°16′21″N 7°03′18″E
- Country: France
- Region: Grand Est
- Department: Vosges
- Arrondissement: Saint-Dié-des-Vosges
- Canton: Saint-Dié-des-Vosges-2
- Intercommunality: CA Saint-Dié-des-Vosges

Government
  - Mayor (2020–2026): Jacques Nicolle
- Area^{1}: 3.72 km^{2} (1.44 sq mi)
- Elevation: 444 m (1,457 ft)
- Highest elevation: 596 m (1,955 ft)
- Lowest elevation: 373 m (1,224 ft)
- Population (2023): 315
  - Density: 84.7/km^{2} (219/sq mi)
- Time zone: UTC+01:00 (CET)
  - Summer (DST): UTC+02:00 (CEST)
- INSEE/Postal code: 88054 /88520
- ^{1} French Land Register data, which excludes lakes, ponds, glaciers > 1 km^{2} (0.386 sq mi or 247 acres) and river estuaries.

Bertrimoutier (French pronunciation: [bɛʁtʁimutje]) is a commune in the Vosges department in Grand Est in northeastern France.

== See also ==
- Communes of the Vosges department
