= Frapelle =

- Commune
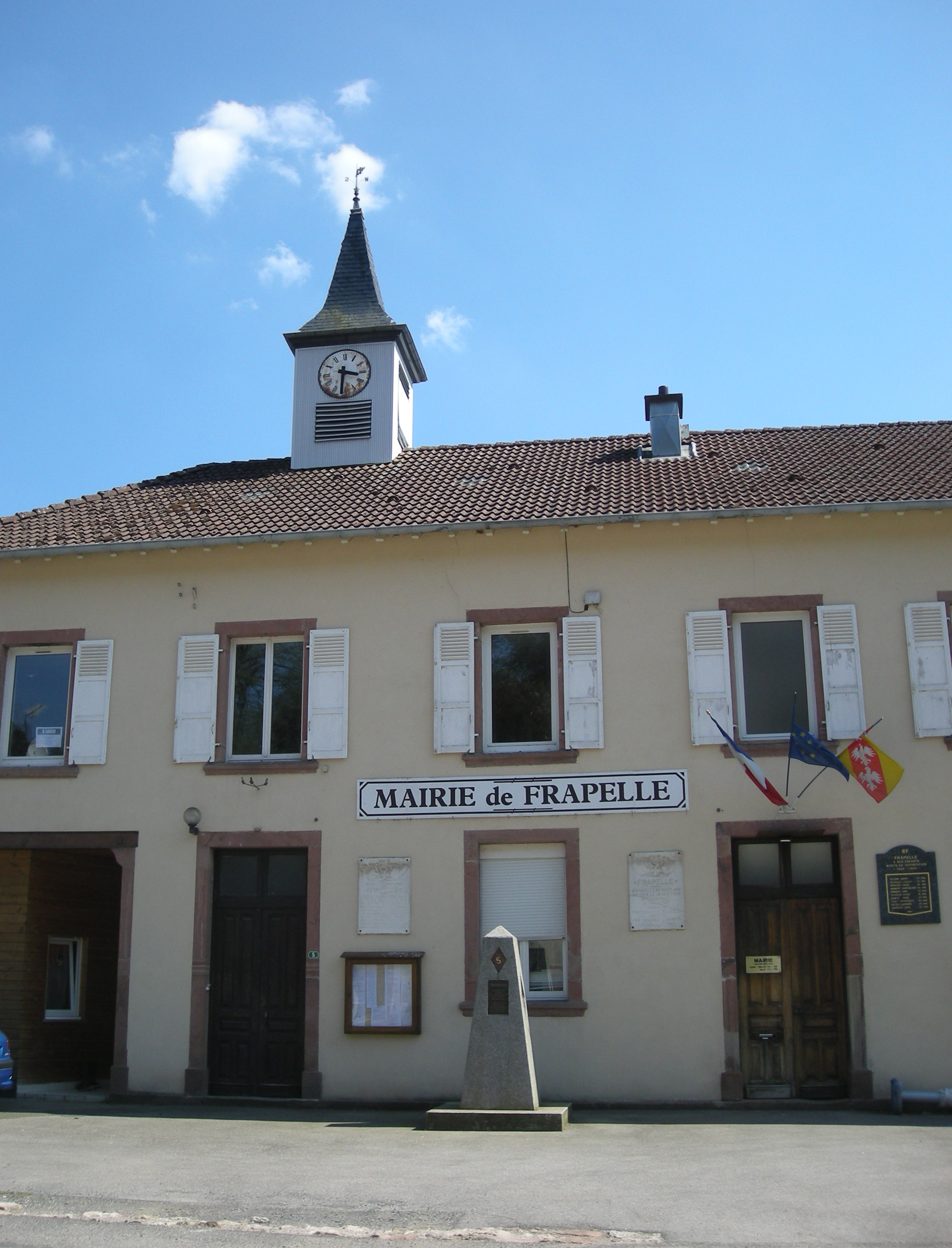
- Town hall
- Location of Frapelle
- Location within France Location within Grand Est
- Coordinates: 48°17′42″N 7°03′52″E
- Country: France
- Region: Grand Est
- Department: Vosges
- Arrondissement: Saint-Dié-des-Vosges
- Canton: Saint-Dié-des-Vosges-2
- Intercommunality: CA Saint-Dié-des-Vosges

Government
  - Mayor (2020–2026): Charline Prince
- Area^{1}: 4.55 km^{2} (1.76 sq mi)
- Highest elevation: 560 m (1,840 ft)
- Lowest elevation: 375 m (1,230 ft)
- Population (2023): 201
  - Density: 44.2/km^{2} (114/sq mi)
- Time zone: UTC+01:00 (CET)
  - Summer (DST): UTC+02:00 (CEST)
- INSEE/Postal code: 88182 /88490
- ^{1} French Land Register data, which excludes lakes, ponds, glaciers > 1 km^{2} (0.386 sq mi or 247 acres) and river estuaries.

Frapelle (French pronunciation: [fʁapɛl]) is a commune in the Vosges department in Grand Est in northeastern France.

== See also ==
- Communes of the Vosges department
