= Canton of Senones =

Coordinates: 48°22′55″N 7°00′36″E

Senones
- Former canton
- Interactive map of Senones
- Country: France
- Region: Grand Est
- Department: Vosges
- No. of communes: {{{nbcomm}}}
- Disbanded: 2015
- Population (2012): 9,702

The Canton of Senones is a former French administrative and electoral grouping of communes in the Vosges département of eastern France and in the region of Lorraine. It was disbanded following the French canton reorganisation which came into effect in March 2015. It consisted of 18 communes, which joined the canton of Raon-l'Étape in 2015. It had 9,702 inhabitants (2012).

It covered an area to the north of Saint-Dié-des-Vosges. One of 9 cantons in the Arrondissement of Saint-Dié-des-Vosges, the Canton of Senones had its administrative centre at Senones.

== Composition ==
The Canton of Senones comprised the following 18 communes:

- Ban-de-Sapt
- Belval
- Châtas
- Denipaire
- Grandrupt
- Hurbache
- Ménil-de-Senones
- Le Mont
- Moussey
- Moyenmoutier
- La Petite-Raon
- Le Puid
- Saint-Jean-d'Ormont
- Saint-Stail
- Le Saulcy
- Senones
- Le Vermont
- Vieux-Moulin

== History ==
The Canton of Senones was created in 1793 as part of the annexation by France of the Principality of Salm-Salm. In 1801 the canton was expanded when it absorbed the Canton of le Puid and some communes from the Canton of Allarmont. However, in 1806 the communes acquired from Allarment were lost to the Canton of Raon-l'Étape.
