= Association of Senones Country communes =

The Association of Senones Country communes (French: Communauté de communes du Pays de Senones) is a former administrative association of communes in the Vosges département of eastern France and in the region of Lorraine. It was merged into the Communauté de communes du Pays des Abbayes in January 2014, which was merged into the new Communauté d'agglomération de Saint-Dié-des-Vosges in January 2017.

Created in June 1998, the association had its administrative offices at Senones.

== Composition ==
The Communauté de communes comprised the following communes:

- Belval
- Grandrupt
- Ménil-de-Senones
- Le Mont, Vosges
- Moussey
- Moyenmoutier
- La Petite-Raon
- Le Puid
- Saint-Stail
- Le Saulcy
- Senones
- Le Vermont
- Vieux-Moulin
