= Association of Plaine Valley communes =

Community of communes in France (1996–2017)

The Association of Plaine Valley communes (French: Communauté de communes de la Vallée de la Plaine) is a former administrative association of communes which straddled the Vosges and Meurthe-et-Moselle départements of eastern France in the region of Lorraine. It was created in December 1996. It was merged into the new Communauté d'agglomération de Saint-Dié-des-Vosges in January 2017. The association had its administrative offices at Raon-l'Étape, which contained more than 75% of the grouping's total population.

The name of the commune comes from the River Plaine which crosses the district.

== Composition ==
The Communauté de communes comprised the following communes:

Meurthe-et-Moselle / 54

- Bionville
- Pierre-Percée
- Raon-lès-Leau

Vosges / 88

- Allarmont
- Celles-sur-Plaine
- Luvigny
- Raon-l'Étape
- Raon-sur-Plaine
- Vexaincourt
