= Communauté de communes du Ban d'Étival =

The Communauté de communes du Ban d'Étival is a former administrative association of communes in the Vosges department of eastern France and in the region of Lorraine. It was created in June 1998 and had its administrative offices at Étival-Clairefontaine. It was merged into the Communauté de communes du Pays des Abbayes in January 2014, which was merged into the new Communauté d'agglomération de Saint-Dié-des-Vosges in January 2017.

The Communauté de communes comprised the following communes:

- Étival-Clairefontaine
- Nompatelize
- Saint-Remy
