= La Voivre =

La Voivre may refer to:

- La Voivre, Haute-Saône, a commune in the French region of Franche-Comté
- La Voivre, Vosges, a commune in the French region of Lorraine
