= Place de la Concorde (1939 film) =

1939 film

- Directed by: Karel Lamac
- Written by: Edmond Albou; Jean Féline; Pierre Humbourg; Max Kolpé
- Starring: Albert Préjean; Dolly Mollinger; Armand Bernard
- Cinematography: Jean Bachelet; Alain Douarinou
- Edited by: Marianne Blanche
- Music by: Paul Misraki
- Production company: Les Films Béril
- Distributed by: Réalisation d'art cinématographique
- Release date: 7 January 1939
- Running time: 78 minutes
- Country: France
- Language: French

Place de la Concorde is a 1939 French comedy film directed by Karel Lamac and starring Albert Préjean, Dolly Mollinger and Armand Bernard. It takes its title from the Place de la Concorde, a major public square in Paris.

== Synopsis ==
After her dress gets caught in the door of the train, a Hungarian-born young woman from the provinces accidentally finds herself carried all the way to Paris. There she meets a chauffeur who is secretly a duke in disguise.

== Cast ==
- Albert Préjean as Le duc Gus de la Rochefouquet
- Dolly Mollinger as Rosy Farkas
- Armand Bernard as Altesse
- René Lefèvre as Ripotot
- Raymond Cordy as Charles, le chauffeur
- Geneviève Callix as Paulette
- Marcelle Praince as La mère de Marion
- Jeanne Fusier-Gir as La lectrice de poème à la radio
- Midlarsky as Le barman
- Maurice Baquet as Papillon
- Claire Gérard as La femme du chef de gare
- Denise Cayrol as Marion
- Bernard Blier as Brioche
- Émile Saint-Ober as Le chef de gare
- Marcel Pérès as Le fiancé
- Betty Spell as La fiancée
- Jacques Henley as Le président du jury

== Bibliography ==
- Crisp, Colin. Genre, Myth and Convention in the French Cinema, 1929-1939. Indiana University Press, 2002.
- Oscherwitz, Dayna & Higgins, MaryEllen. The A to Z of French Cinema. Scarecrow Press, 2009.
