= Vieux-Moulin =

Vieux-Moulin may refer to the following places in France:

- Vieux-Moulin, Oise, a commune in the Oise department
- Vieux-Moulin, Vosges, a commune in the Vosges department
