= Jardins de Callunes =

Botanical gardens in Grand Est, France

Coordinates: 48.3402°N 7.0146°E

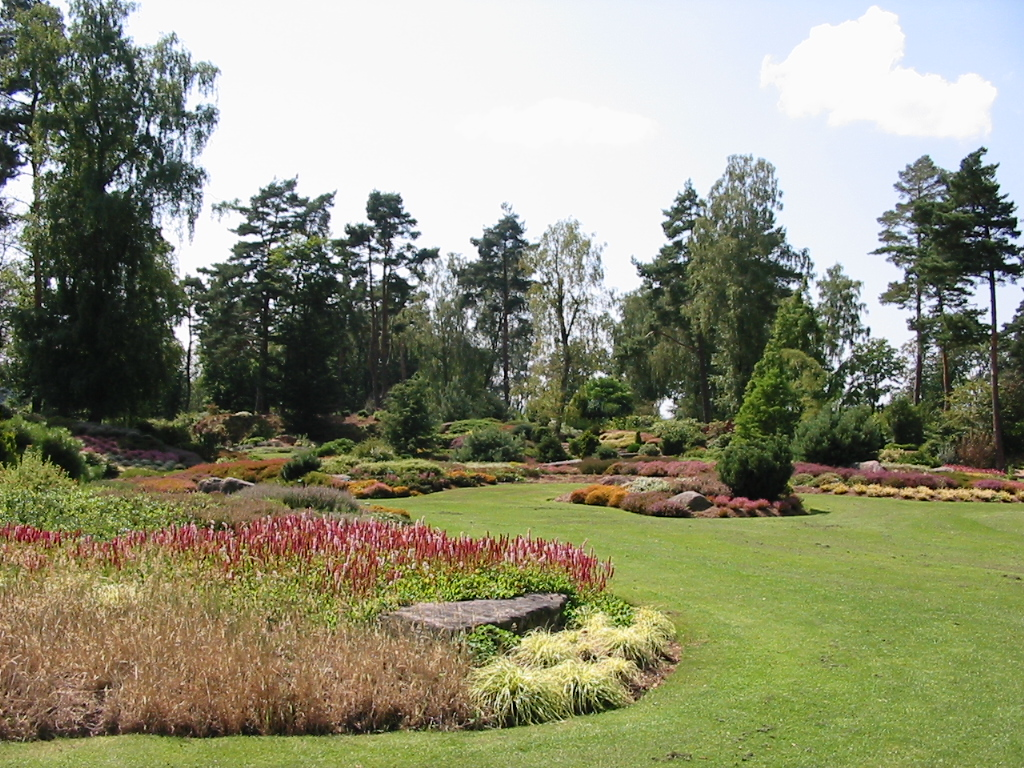
Jardins de Callunes

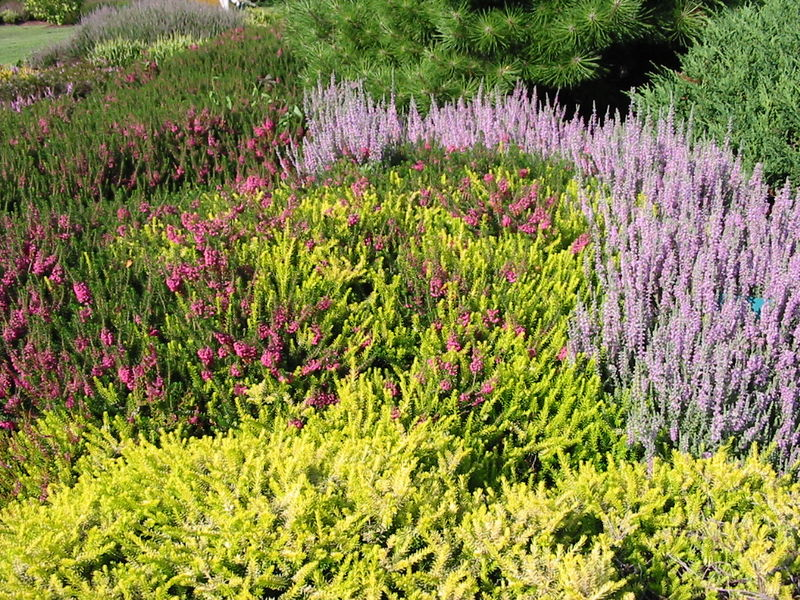
Ericaceae in flower

The Jardins de Callunes (4 hectares) are botanical gardens specializing in heather. They are located at 5, Chemin de la Prelle, Ban-de-Sapt, Vosges, Grand Est, France, and open daily in the warmer months; an admission fee is charged.

The gardens opened to the public in 1996 after 7 years of design and planting under the direction of landscaper Jacques Couturieux. They form part of the rehabilitation of a former quarry, and traces of the pink sandstone and trench warfare from World War I still remain.

Today the gardens comprise ten distinct areas linked by sweeping lawns and walkways. The pine forest, created in 1994, contains good collections of rhododendron and azalea beneath pines and Japanese maples. The heather gardens contain about 250 varieties of Erica, Calluna, and Daboecia, with rock gardens containing a further 180 taxa of alpine plants. The garden also contains tree peonies, phlox, saxifrage, water plants, and various perennials and shrubs.

== See also ==
- List of botanical gardens in France
