= Raon-l'Étape =

- Commune
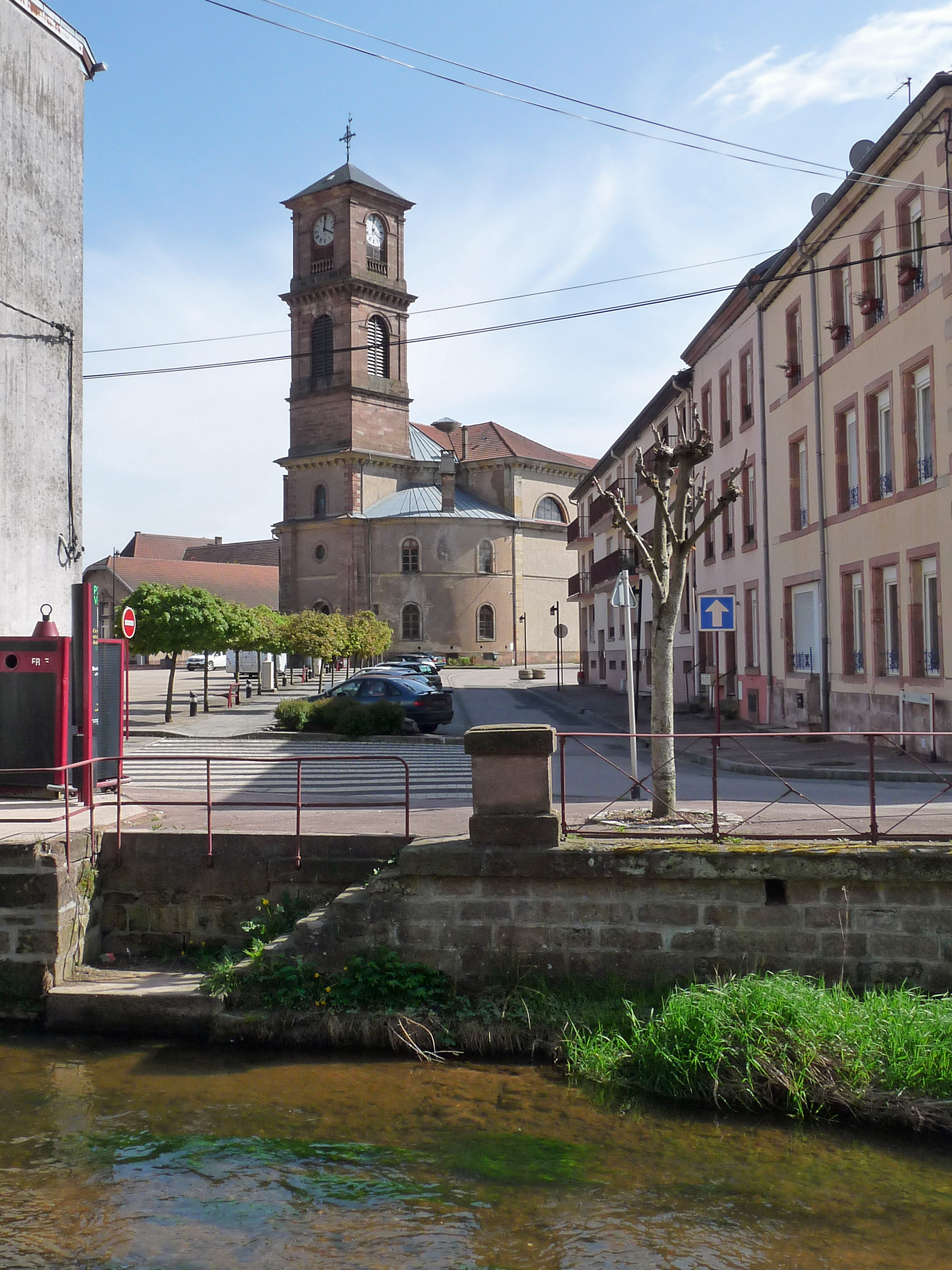
- The river Plaine

- Coat of arms
- Location of Raon-l'Étape
- Location within France Location within Grand Est
- Coordinates: 48°25′N 6°50′E
- Country: France
- Region: Grand Est
- Department: Vosges
- Arrondissement: Saint-Dié-des-Vosges
- Canton: Raon-l'Étape
- Intercommunality: CA Saint-Dié-des-Vosges

Government
  - Mayor (2020–2026): Benoît Pierrat
- Area^{1}: 23.71 km^{2} (9.15 sq mi)
- Elevation: 291 m (955 ft)
- Highest elevation: 610 m (2,000 ft)
- Lowest elevation: 279 m (915 ft)
- Population (2023): 5,886
  - Density: 248.2/km^{2} (643.0/sq mi)
- Time zone: UTC+01:00 (CET)
  - Summer (DST): UTC+02:00 (CEST)
- INSEE/Postal code: 88372 /88110
- ^{1} French Land Register data, which excludes lakes, ponds, glaciers > 1 km^{2} (0.386 sq mi or 247 acres) and river estuaries.

Raon-l'Étape (French pronunciation: [ʁɑ̃ letap] or [ʁaɔ̃ letap]) is a commune in the Vosges Department in Grand Est in northeastern France.

Inhabitants are called Raonnais.

== Geography ==
Raon-l'Étape is positioned at the mouth of the Plaine at the point where it converges into the Meurthe, itself a tributary of the Moselle. Because it is on departmental frontier with the adjacent Meurthe-et-Moselle département, Raon-l'Étape is sometimes known as the "Gateway to the Vosges" (porte des Vosges). The town is positioned at a point where relatively flat lands transform into a much more mountainous topography: the mountains have for centuries restricted the options for travellers between francophone France and Alsace (formerly the western reaches of the Empire on the other side of the Vosges). The position of Raon has therefore been critical to influencing the movements of merchandise in peace time and of armies in war time for many centuries.

Saint-Dié-des-Vosges is 17 kilometres (11 mi) to the south-east while Nancy is 69 kilometres (43 mi) to the north-west, in both cases tracking the national road RN59, much of which has in recent years been upgraded to quasi-autoroute quality. Taking a cross country route, Épinal is approximately 44 kilometres (27 mi) to the south-west.

The little town is closely surrounded by woodland, which covers almost 60% of the communal territory.

The town has a long tradition of manufacturing in a wide range of sectors such as paper milling, quarrying, engineering, plastics, textiles, clothing and telecommunications. It is also a major commercial centre for surrounding communes, notably on Saturday mornings, Saturday being market day.

== History ==
=== The name ===
An earlier name for the commune was 'Ravon', a word which in the local dialect denotes the confluence of rivers. 'Étape' has mutated from the word 'Tape' which was the name given to the right to transit the territory, obtained in return for a toll which was imposed on merchants, whether moving their goods along the river or along the adjacent road.

=== Two settlements on either side of the Meurthe ===
The old village was founded in the thirteenth century on the 'champ de Rua', near the confluence of the Plaine and Meurthe rivers, and dominated by Beauregard Castle which had been rebuilt and extended by Frederick III, Duke of Lorraine. The land was included within the territory of Moyenmoutier Abbey. The Dukes of Lorraine controlled the transit of salt and wheat towards the mountains, and imposed a 'protection levy' on the 'Saulniers Way', a well frequented trade route across the mountains towards Sélestat and Saales.

The foundation of Raon achieved its economic objectives, attracting members of the mercantile class which was growing across Europe at this time. The application of the Beaumont Law in the little town enfranchised the merchants, providing an enhanced contractual basis for commerce. Geography also favoured commerce with the presence of two navigable rivers, and economic success was assured through civic privileges conferred by the dukes and through the security afforded by the growth of fortifications and the maintenance of a military garrison.

On the left bank of the river, the hamlet of La Neuveville dates back further, having been established during the twelfth century with protection and support from Duke of Lorraine by the cannons of Étival Abbey who provided both the necessary land and the expertise. The port at La Neuveville made it possible for loads of both processed and rough-cut timber to be exported along the river. The little town grew rapidly in size and wealth, and the white monks themselves reverted to a more contemplative existence, while the civilian administration of the dukes seized the initiative in founding Raon-l'Étape on the other side of the river which made it easier to protect transshipment across the river the important Saulniers Way trade route towards the mountains and The Empire beyond.

During the fourteenth century the civil influence of the monks declined at La Neuveville as the little town and its important port facilities came increasingly under the sole control of the Dukes, while the citizens continued vigorously to reject the pressing influence of Raon-l'Étape.

Neither town grew beyond a population of a few thousand, still separated into two settlements by their river, until the nineteenth century, but by the end of the seventeenth century they nevertheless had grown larger than Saint-Dié up in the mountains to the south-east.

In 1864 it was the left bank, and therefore La Neuveville, that was privileged to receive a rail connection on the line from Nancy. The railway brought industrialisation and also put an end to the transportation of timber by floating it down the river, which had contributed to the development of the little port for so long. Paradoxically, it was the prestige of Raon-l'Étape which in some ways benefitted more than that of La Neuveville: tourism began to evolve in France for the first time in the late nineteenth century, and the old right bank town with its picturesque medieval streets offered a quaint charm that replaced the industrial and commercial action that grew apace in its left bank rival.

The commune of today results from the merger in 1947 of La Neuveville and Raon-l'Étape into a single commune. Their strategic position meant that both towns suffered badly in the Second World War, and the remaining residents were strongly supported by humanitarian aid from, in particular, the Swiss Red Cross in the years immediately following the conflagration. The acting mayor of La Neuveville, who was a man named Capel, wondered if rebuilding a separate mairie was worthwhile at a time of severe economic hardship, given that the mairie of Raon-l'Étape now looked unnecessarily large for the diminished population level on the right bank.

The proposal to merge the communes was therefore essentially driven by the economics of the situation in which the communities found themselves: the responsible councils and the prefect were persuaded and the fusion of the former rival communes went ahead. Although the two communes had been intended by their founders as complementary settlements, long centuries of rivalry were not so easily set aside, and the different banks of the river continue to value their separate histories.

=== Old Wars ===
==== The Thirty Years' War 1618-1648 ====
The closing decades of the sixteenth century and the first half of the seventeenth century were a particularly grim period for Lorraine and for much of Europe. The weather seems to have contributed an above average quota of poor or failed harvests, while the Thirty Years' War unleashed a catalogue of horrors, especially on the territories such as Lorraine that found themselves buffered between two great continental powers of that time, France and The Empire. Massacres, looting and executions were inflicted both by the locally recruited armies and by the hordes of the dispossessed that often followed in their wake. The Swedish armies, allied with the French, have a reputation for particular savagery in Lorraine during the time of Duke Charles IV. Two battles unfolded before the walls of Raon during the period. The first of them in 1635 found the troops of the recently defeated Duke of Lorraine confronting the French cavalry: on this occasion Lorraine prevailed. But in 1636 there was another battle in which the armies of Lorraine and their imperial allies were defeated. That same year Richelieu, the French king's first minister, keen to minimise opportunities for Austrian resistance, arranged for the flattening of all the castles in Lorraine, including Beauregard Castle which for centuries has overlooked Raon. All the passing armies and successive battles left behind them only ruin and desolation. The local economy collapsed: famine and plague ensued. Lorraine was slow to recover. The statistical records show large numbers of people simply disappeared. Even in 1710, a census undertaken for Raon counted only 194 inhabitants.

==== The French revolution and its aftermath 1789-1800 ====
For the most part. the violent and destructive manifestations of the French Revolution and the battles of the ensuing Napoleonic Wars occurred far from Lorraine, though the district suffered its share of economic disruption and the mobilisation of fighting age men. The administrative reforms that occurred across France put an end once and for all to the church-state partnership that had controlled the country for so long under the ancien regime, and left the civil state in control.

==== The Franco-Prussian war ====
After the French imperial army of Napoleon III was defeated at Sedan on 2 September 1870, and faced with the advance of enemy troops further south in the Vosges region, resistance mobilised rapidly, as disparate companies of Gardes Mobiles and of irregular guerilla fighters sprang to arms.

Several fighters were killed at a battle occurring in the Plaine Valley at a small settlement called Lajus on 20 September 1870, and the region experienced various skirmishes, small scale battles and other incidents including the taking and shooting of civilian hostages during and beyond the closing months of 1870. The most important battle took place on 6 October 1870 in the La Salle - Nompatelize sector (after which the battle would be named), at a gap in the mountains on the route towards Épinal. The battle was won by the Baden Brigade commanded by General Degenfeld.

After the Peace signed at Frankfurt on 10 May 1871, Raon was garrisoned by a battalion of the 9th Pomeranian Regiment who were initially billeted on the citizens, and subsequently installed in a barracks that was completed by the end of December 1871. On 14 November 1872 the Pomeranians were replaced by the 2nd battalion of Prince Albrecht's 73rd regiment of Hanoverian Fusiliers. They administered Raon-l'Étape in collaboration with the civilian authorities without major incident. Nevertheless, the town was obliged to pay financial contributions / reparations totally 33,840 francs. On 30 July 1873 the occupation ended and the German troops withdrew towards Baccarat and the new Franco-German frontier to the north of Nancy. The departure of the soldiers unleashed much celebration in Raon.

== Population ==
Historical population
Year	Pop.	±% p.a.
1968	7,696	—
1975	7,741	+0.08%
1982	7,039	−1.35%
1990	6,780	−0.47%
1999	6,749	−0.05%
2007	6,710	−0.07%
2012	6,478	−0.70%
2017	6,388	−0.28%
2023	5,886	−1.35%
Source: INSEE

== Sport ==
US Raon-l'Étape is based in the town.

== Personalities ==
- Alain Devaquet, a Gaullist politician prominent in the Jacques Chirac period, was born in 1942 at Raon.
- Alain Schneider, the singer, was born at Raon.
- Joseph Julien Souhait 1759–1842, who achieved prominence as a politician in the wake of the French Revolution and was accordingly exiled (to Switzerland) following the Bourbon restoration of 1814, was born at Raon. He was allowed back after the 1830 revolution installed the son of a fellow regicide as the 'bourgeois' king. Souhait died in Nancy.

== See also ==
- Communes of the Vosges department
