= Saint-Remy, Vosges =

Saint-Remy
- Commune
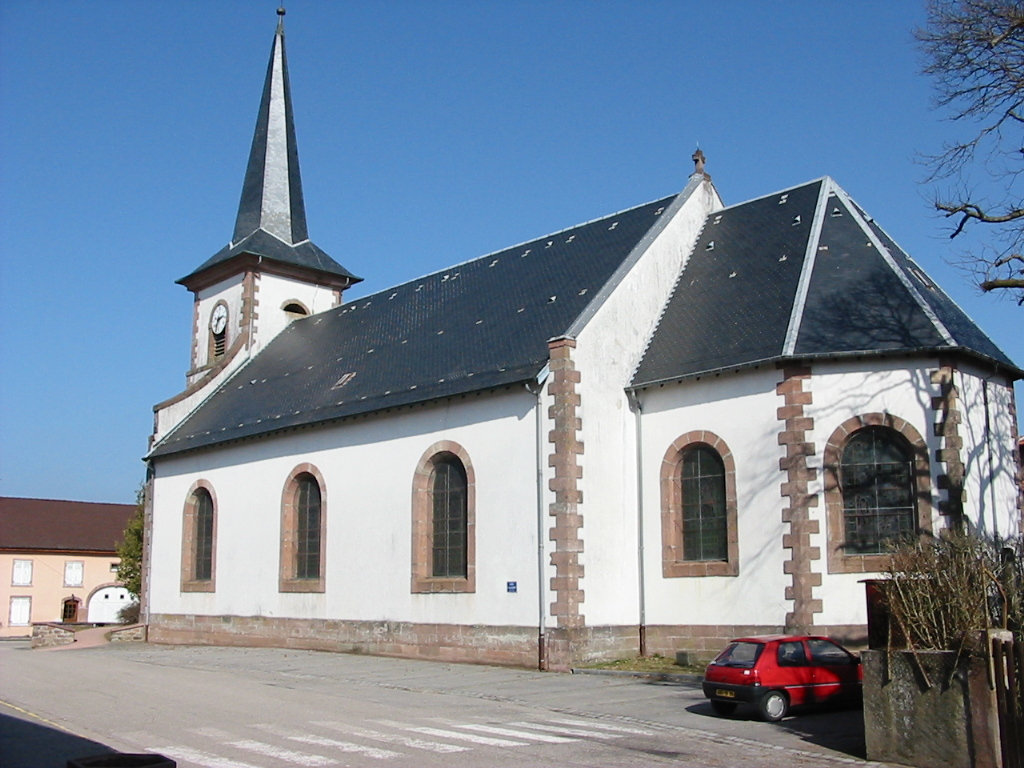
- Saint-Remy

- Coat of arms
- Location of Saint-Remy
- Location within France Location within Grand Est
- Coordinates: 48°20′52″N 6°49′42″E
- Country: France
- Region: Grand Est
- Department: Vosges
- Arrondissement: Saint-Dié-des-Vosges
- Canton: Raon-l'Étape
- Intercommunality: CA Saint-Dié-des-Vosges

Government
  - Mayor (2020–2026): Claude George
- Area^{1}: 12.25 km^{2} (4.73 sq mi)
- Elevation: 350 m (1,150 ft)
- Highest elevation: 524 m (1,719 ft)
- Lowest elevation: 317 m (1,040 ft)
- Population (2023): 518
  - Density: 42.3/km^{2} (110/sq mi)
- Time zone: UTC+01:00 (CET)
  - Summer (DST): UTC+02:00 (CEST)
- INSEE/Postal code: 88435 /88480
- ^{1} French Land Register data, which excludes lakes, ponds, glaciers > 1 km^{2} (0.386 sq mi or 247 acres) and river estuaries.

Saint-Remy (French pronunciation: [sɛ̃ ʁemi]) is a commune in the Vosges department in Grand Est in northeastern France.

It is located on the D7, 4 km (2.5 mi) south-west of Étival-Clairefontaine.

== See also ==
- Communes of the Vosges department
