= Saint-Jean-d'Ormont =

- Commune
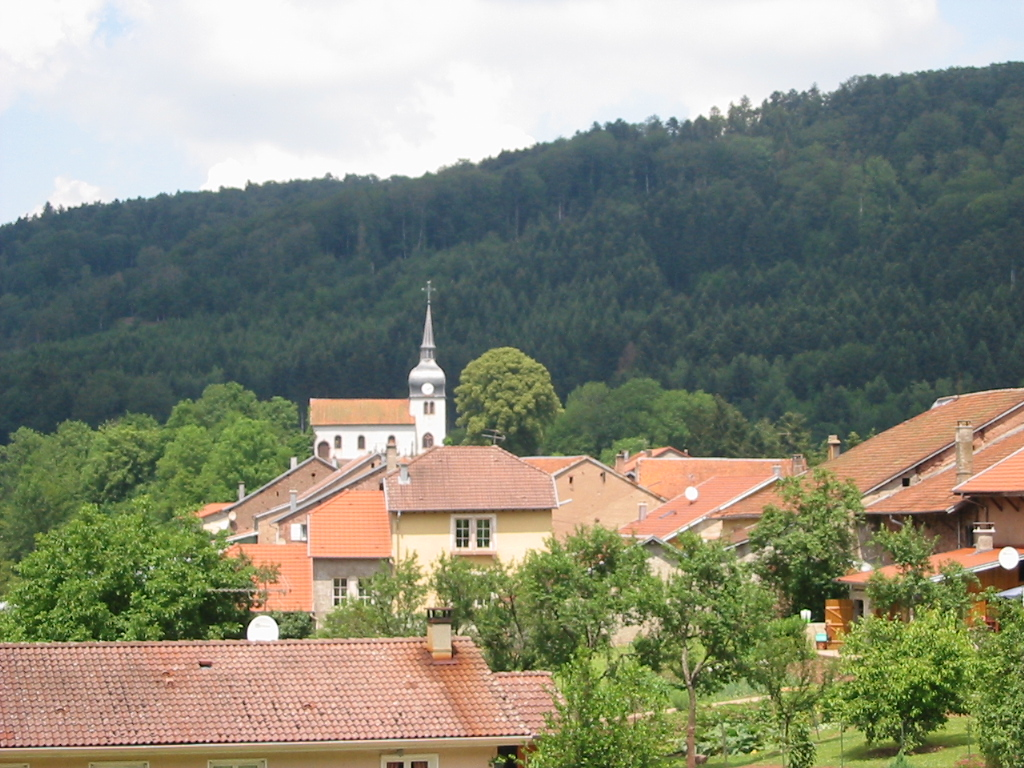
- A general view of Saint-Jean-d'Ormont
- Location of Saint-Jean-d'Ormont
- Location within France Location within Grand Est
- Coordinates: 48°20′01″N 6°59′20″E
- Country: France
- Region: Grand Est
- Department: Vosges
- Arrondissement: Saint-Dié-des-Vosges
- Canton: Raon-l'Étape
- Intercommunality: CA Saint-Dié-des-Vosges

Government
  - Mayor (2020–2026): Christian Demange
- Area^{1}: 5.29 km^{2} (2.04 sq mi)
- Elevation: 412 m (1,352 ft)
- Highest elevation: 830 m (2,720 ft)
- Lowest elevation: 370 m (1,210 ft)
- Population (2023): 134
  - Density: 25.3/km^{2} (65.6/sq mi)
- Time zone: UTC+01:00 (CET)
  - Summer (DST): UTC+02:00 (CEST)
- INSEE/Postal code: 88419 /88210
- ^{1} French Land Register data, which excludes lakes, ponds, glaciers > 1 km^{2} (0.386 sq mi or 247 acres) and river estuaries.

Saint-Jean-d'Ormont (French pronunciation: [sɛ̃ ʒɑ̃ dɔʁmɔ̃]) is a commune in the Vosges department in Grand Est in northeastern France.

== See also ==
- Communes of the Vosges department
