= La Petite-Raon =

- Commune
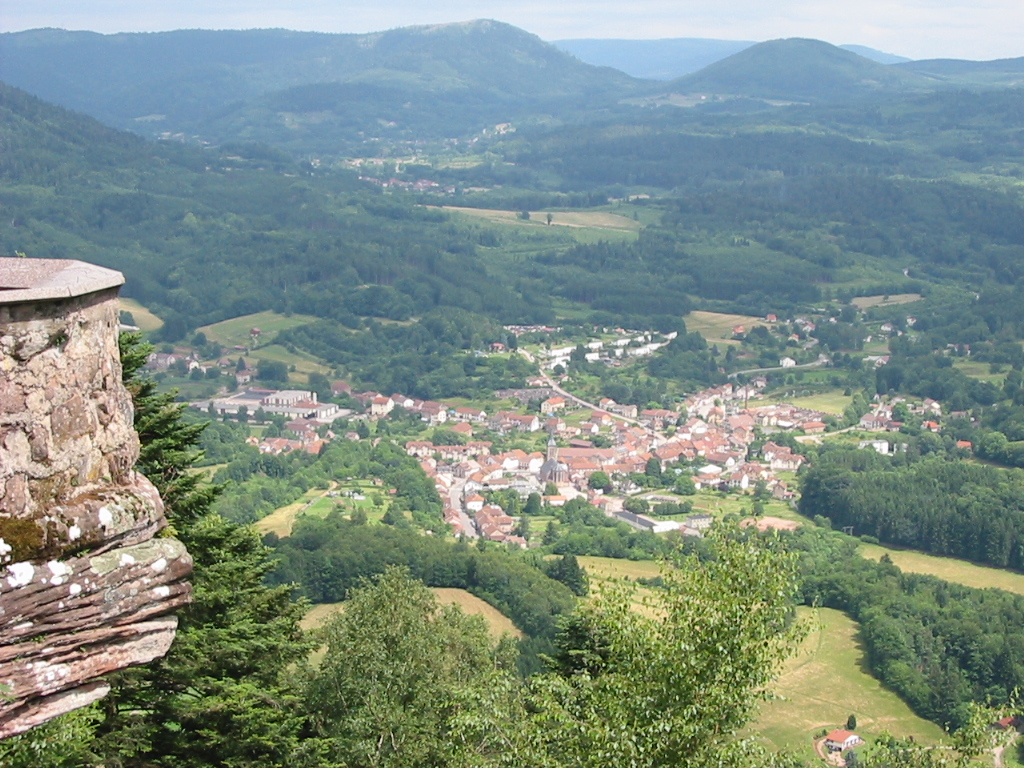
- A general view of La Petite-Raon

- Coat of arms
- Location of La Petite-Raon
- Location within France Location within Grand Est
- Coordinates: 48°24′26″N 6°59′44″E
- Country: France
- Region: Grand Est
- Department: Vosges
- Arrondissement: Saint-Dié-des-Vosges
- Canton: Raon-l'Étape
- Intercommunality: CA Saint-Dié-des-Vosges

Government
  - Mayor (2020–2026): Jean Rabolt
- Area^{1}: 9.09 km^{2} (3.51 sq mi)
- Elevation: 360 m (1,180 ft)
- Highest elevation: 800 m (2,600 ft)
- Lowest elevation: 345 m (1,132 ft)
- Population (2023): 734
  - Density: 80.7/km^{2} (209/sq mi)
- Time zone: UTC+01:00 (CET)
  - Summer (DST): UTC+02:00 (CEST)
- INSEE/Postal code: 88346 /88210
- ^{1} French Land Register data, which excludes lakes, ponds, glaciers > 1 km^{2} (0.386 sq mi or 247 acres) and river estuaries.

La Petite-Raon (French pronunciation: [la pətit ʁaɔ̃]) is a commune in the Vosges department in Grand Est in northeastern France.

Inhabitants are called Petit-Raonnais.

== Geography ==
La Petite-Raon nestles in the valley of the Rabodeau at the point where it is joined by the little Stream de la Rochère. The village is some 2 kilometres upstream of Senones on a small road that continues north-east and ultimately, road conditions permitting, crosses the Vosges Mountains into Alsace.

== History ==
La Petite-Raon was a village in the old Duchy of Lorraine. In the late medieval period it was part of the County of Salm, but fetched up in Lorraine in 1600. When the principality of Salm-Salm was formed in 1751, La Petite-Raon was incorporated within it until 1792 when in the wake of the Revolution the village found itself in France, as a commune within the Canton of Senones.

== See also ==
- Communes of the Vosges department
