= Hurbache =

- Commune
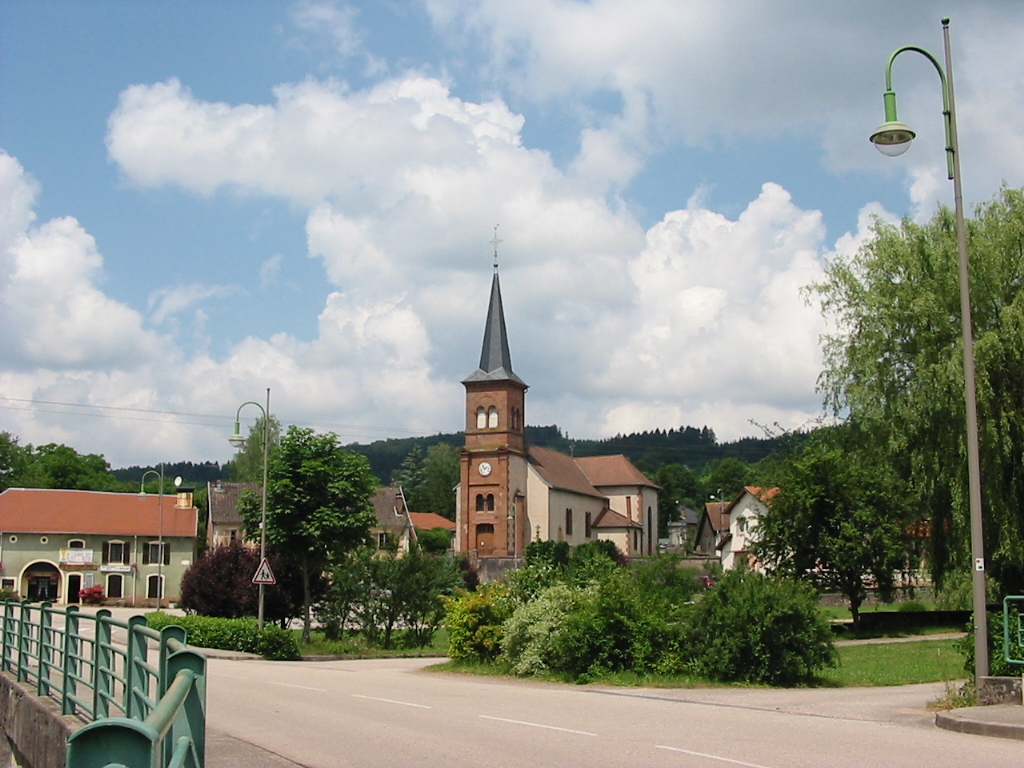
- The church and surroundings in Hurbache
- Location of Hurbache
- Location within France Location within Grand Est
- Coordinates: 48°21′02″N 6°56′07″E
- Country: France
- Region: Grand Est
- Department: Vosges
- Arrondissement: Saint-Dié-des-Vosges
- Canton: Raon-l'Étape
- Intercommunality: CA Saint-Dié-des-Vosges

Government
  - Mayor (2020–2026): Patrick Villaume
- Area^{1}: 9.93 km^{2} (3.83 sq mi)
- Elevation: 435 m (1,427 ft)
- Highest elevation: 592 m (1,942 ft)
- Lowest elevation: 304 m (997 ft)
- Population (2023): 285
  - Density: 28.7/km^{2} (74.3/sq mi)
- Time zone: UTC+01:00 (CET)
  - Summer (DST): UTC+02:00 (CEST)
- INSEE/Postal code: 88245 /88210
- ^{1} French Land Register data, which excludes lakes, ponds, glaciers > 1 km^{2} (0.386 sq mi or 247 acres) and river estuaries.

Hurbache (French pronunciation: [yʁbaʃ]) is a commune in the Vosges department in Grand Est in northeastern France.

== See also ==
- Communes of the Vosges department
