= Celles-sur-Plaine =

- Commune
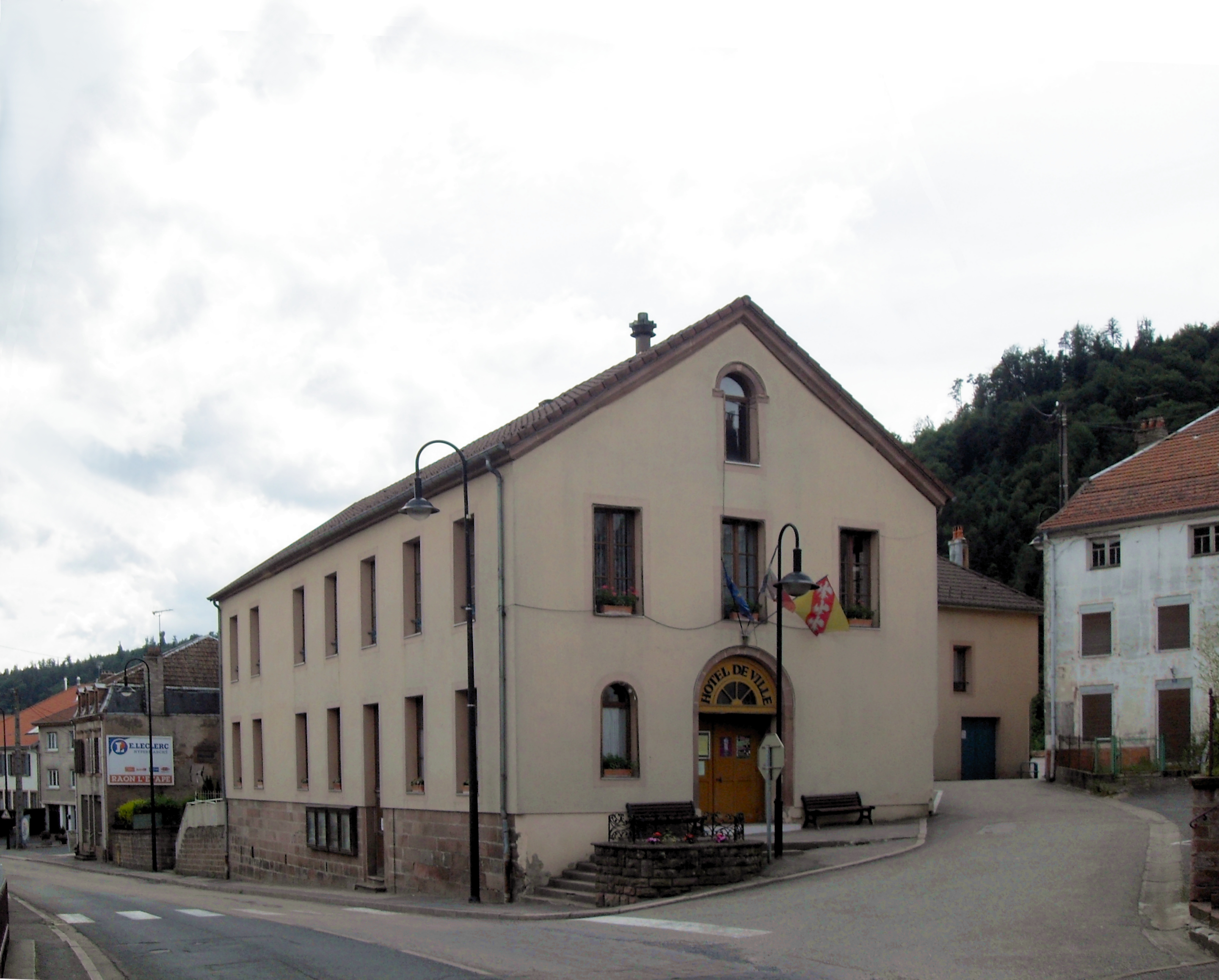
- The town hall in Celles-sur-Plaine

- Flag Coat of arms
- Location of Celles-sur-Plaine
- Location within France Location within Grand Est
- Coordinates: 48°27′25″N 6°57′02″E
- Country: France
- Region: Grand Est
- Department: Vosges
- Arrondissement: Saint-Dié-des-Vosges
- Canton: Raon-l'Étape
- Intercommunality: CA Saint-Dié-des-Vosges

Government
  - Mayor (2020–2026): Christine Risse
- Area^{1}: 20.09 km^{2} (7.76 sq mi)
- Elevation: 320 m (1,050 ft)
- Highest elevation: 831 m (2,726 ft)
- Lowest elevation: 300 m (980 ft)
- Population (2023): 737
  - Density: 36.7/km^{2} (95.0/sq mi)
- Time zone: UTC+01:00 (CET)
  - Summer (DST): UTC+02:00 (CEST)
- INSEE/Postal code: 88082 /88110
- ^{1} French Land Register data, which excludes lakes, ponds, glaciers > 1 km^{2} (0.386 sq mi or 247 acres) and river estuaries.

Celles-sur-Plaine (French pronunciation: [sɛl syʁ plɛn]) is a commune in the Vosges department in Grand Est in northeastern France.

== See also ==
- Communes of the Vosges department
