= Bionville =

- Commune
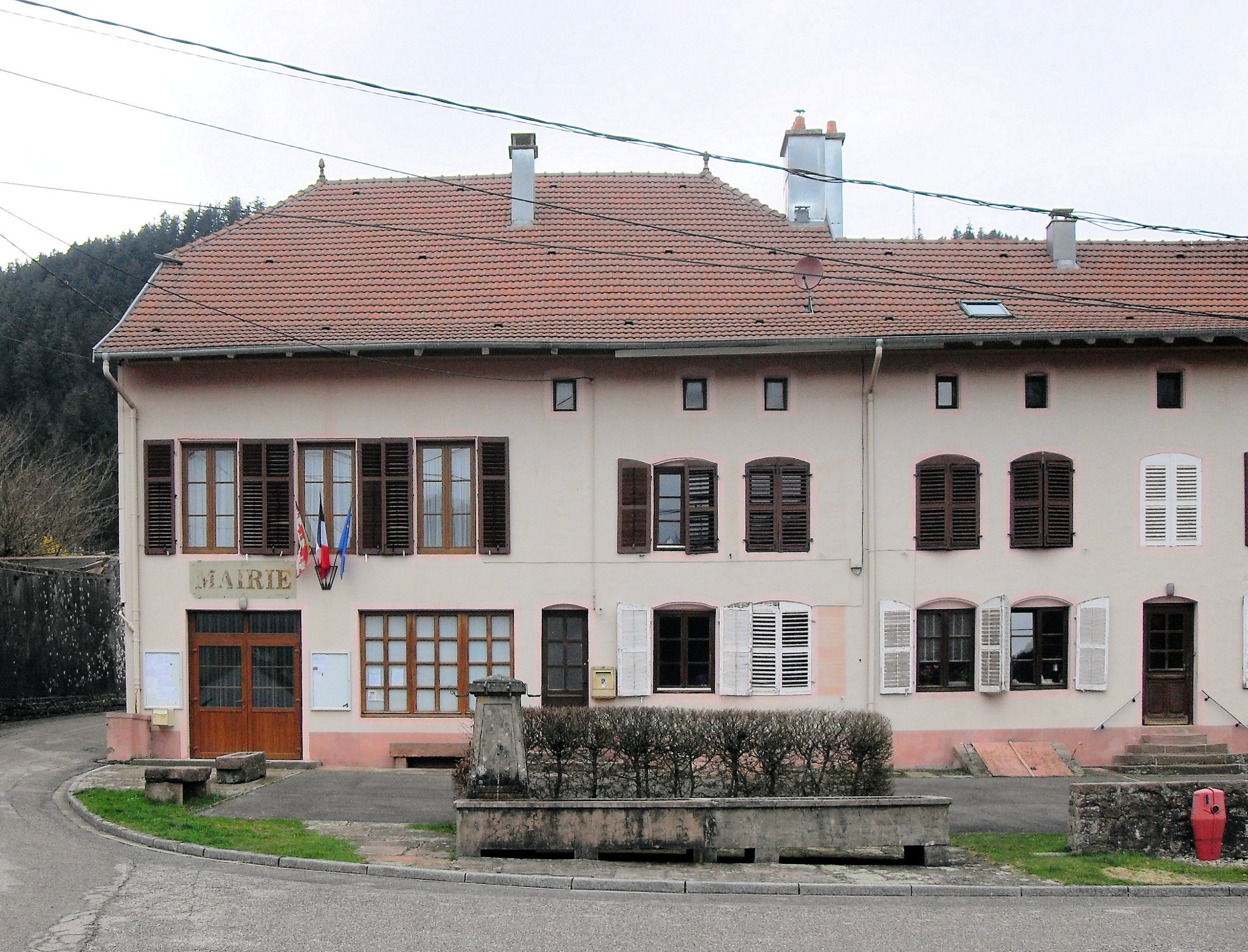
- The town hall in Bionville

- Coat of arms
- Location of Bionville
- Location within France Location within Grand Est
- Coordinates: 48°29′05″N 7°00′41″E
- Country: France
- Region: Grand Est
- Department: Meurthe-et-Moselle
- Arrondissement: Lunéville
- Canton: Baccarat
- Intercommunality: CA Saint-Dié-des-Vosges

Government
  - Mayor (2022–2026): Christian Petit
- Area^{1}: 12.14 km^{2} (4.69 sq mi)
- Elevation: 435 m (1,427 ft)
- Highest elevation: 730 m (2,400 ft)
- Lowest elevation: 325 m (1,066 ft)
- Population (2023): 112
  - Density: 9.23/km^{2} (23.9/sq mi)
- Time zone: UTC+01:00 (CET)
  - Summer (DST): UTC+02:00 (CEST)
- INSEE/Postal code: 54075 /54540
- ^{1} French Land Register data, which excludes lakes, ponds, glaciers > 1 km^{2} (0.386 sq mi or 247 acres) and river estuaries.

Bionville (French pronunciation: [bjɔ̃vil]) is a commune in the Meurthe-et-Moselle department in northeastern France.

== Population ==
Historical population
Year	Pop.	±% p.a.
1968	123	—
1975	80	−5.96%
1982	105	+3.96%
1990	97	−0.99%
1999	124	+2.77%
2007	135	+1.07%
2012	126	−1.37%
2017	116	−1.64%
2023	112	−0.58%
Source: INSEE

== See also ==
- Communes of the Meurthe-et-Moselle department
