= Vexaincourt =

- Commune
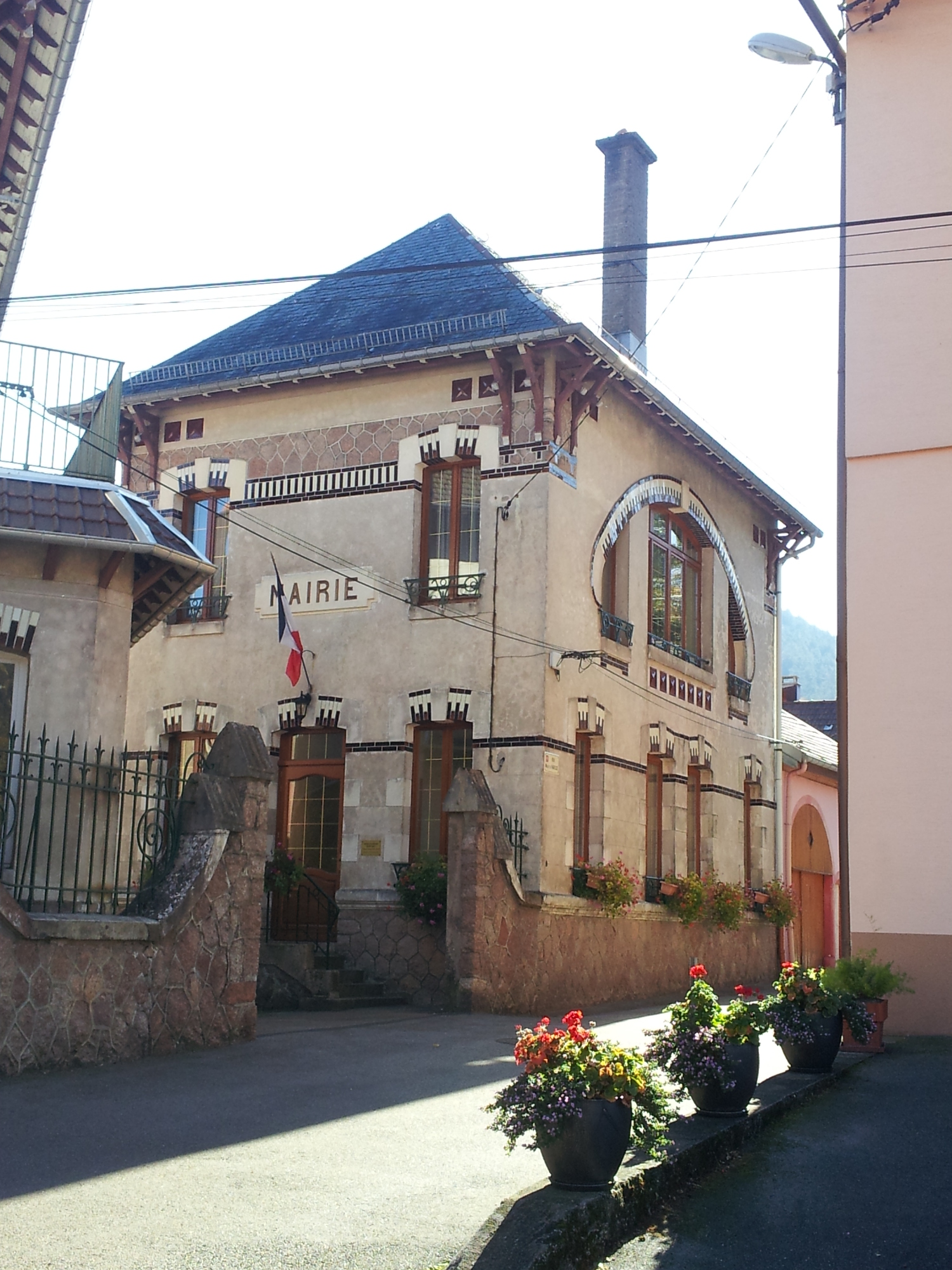
- The town hall in Vexaincourt

- Coat of arms
- Location of Vexaincourt
- Location within France Location within Grand Est
- Coordinates: 48°29′39″N 7°02′47″E
- Country: France
- Region: Grand Est
- Department: Vosges
- Arrondissement: Saint-Dié-des-Vosges
- Canton: Raon-l'Étape
- Intercommunality: CA Saint-Dié-des-Vosges

Government
  - Mayor (2020–2026): Marie-Christine Regnier
- Area^{1}: 11.38 km^{2} (4.39 sq mi)
- Elevation: 376 m (1,234 ft)
- Highest elevation: 880 m (2,890 ft)
- Lowest elevation: 355 m (1,165 ft)
- Population (2023): 146
  - Density: 12.8/km^{2} (33.2/sq mi)
- Time zone: UTC+01:00 (CET)
  - Summer (DST): UTC+02:00 (CEST)
- INSEE/Postal code: 88503 /88110
- ^{1} French Land Register data, which excludes lakes, ponds, glaciers > 1 km^{2} (0.386 sq mi or 247 acres) and river estuaries.

Vexaincourt (French pronunciation: [vɛksɛ̃kuʁ]) is a commune in the Vosges department in Grand Est in northeastern France.

== See also ==
- Communes of the Vosges department
