= Denipaire =

- Commune
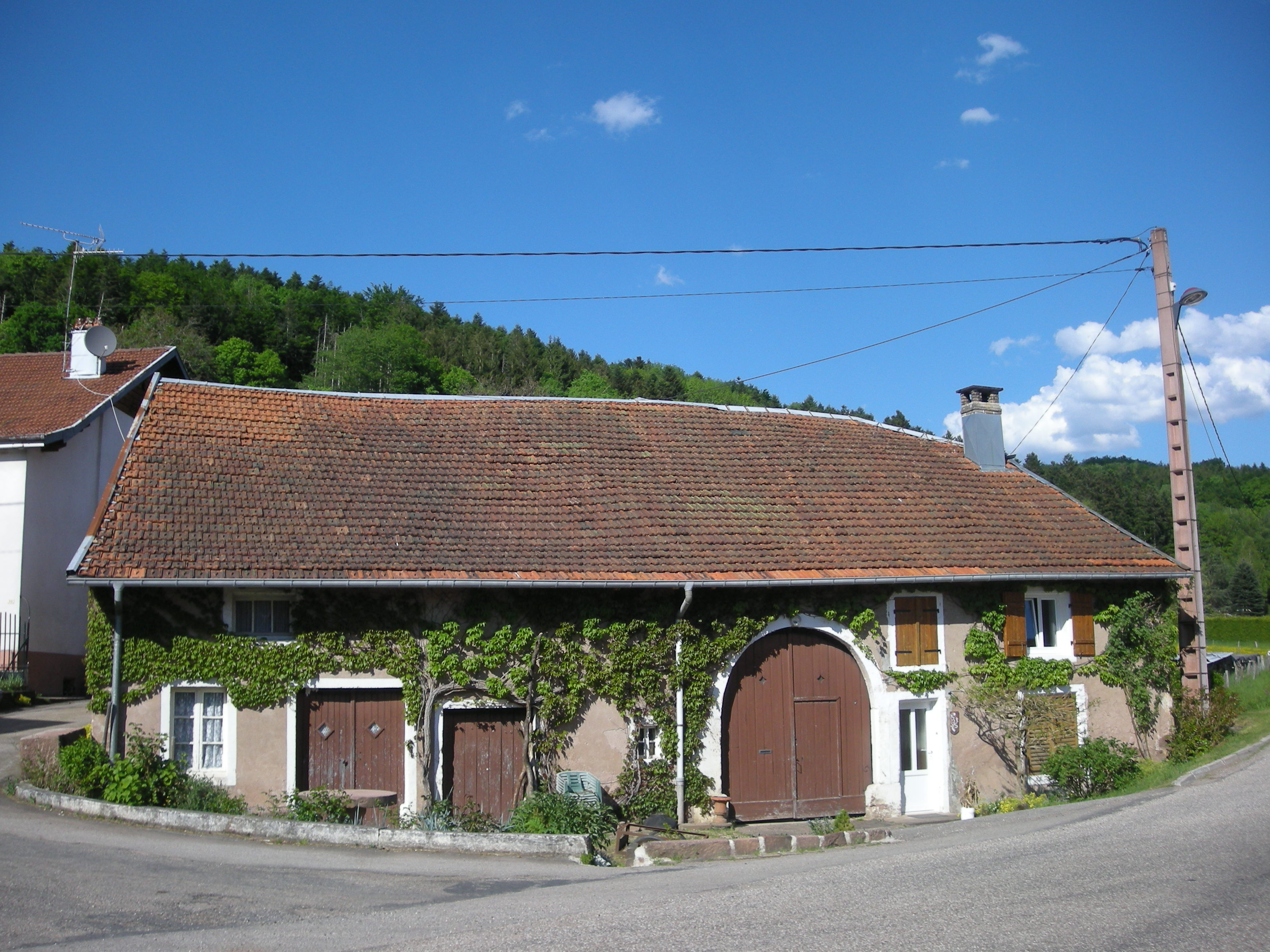
- A farmhouse in Denipaire
- Location of Denipaire
- Location within France Location within Grand Est
- Coordinates: 48°20′37″N 6°58′00″E
- Country: France
- Region: Grand Est
- Department: Vosges
- Arrondissement: Saint-Dié-des-Vosges
- Canton: Raon-l'Étape
- Intercommunality: CA Saint-Dié-des-Vosges

Government
  - Mayor (2020–2026): Didier Agusti
- Area^{1}: 7.02 km^{2} (2.71 sq mi)
- Elevation: 350 m (1,150 ft)
- Highest elevation: 650 m (2,130 ft)
- Lowest elevation: 333 m (1,093 ft)
- Population (2023): 243
  - Density: 34.6/km^{2} (89.7/sq mi)
- Time zone: UTC+01:00 (CET)
  - Summer (DST): UTC+02:00 (CEST)
- INSEE/Postal code: 88128 /88210
- ^{1} French Land Register data, which excludes lakes, ponds, glaciers > 1 km^{2} (0.386 sq mi or 247 acres) and river estuaries.

Denipaire (French pronunciation: [dənipɛʁ]) is a commune in the Vosges department in Grand Est in northeastern France.

== See also ==
- Communes of the Vosges department
