= Châtas =

- Commune
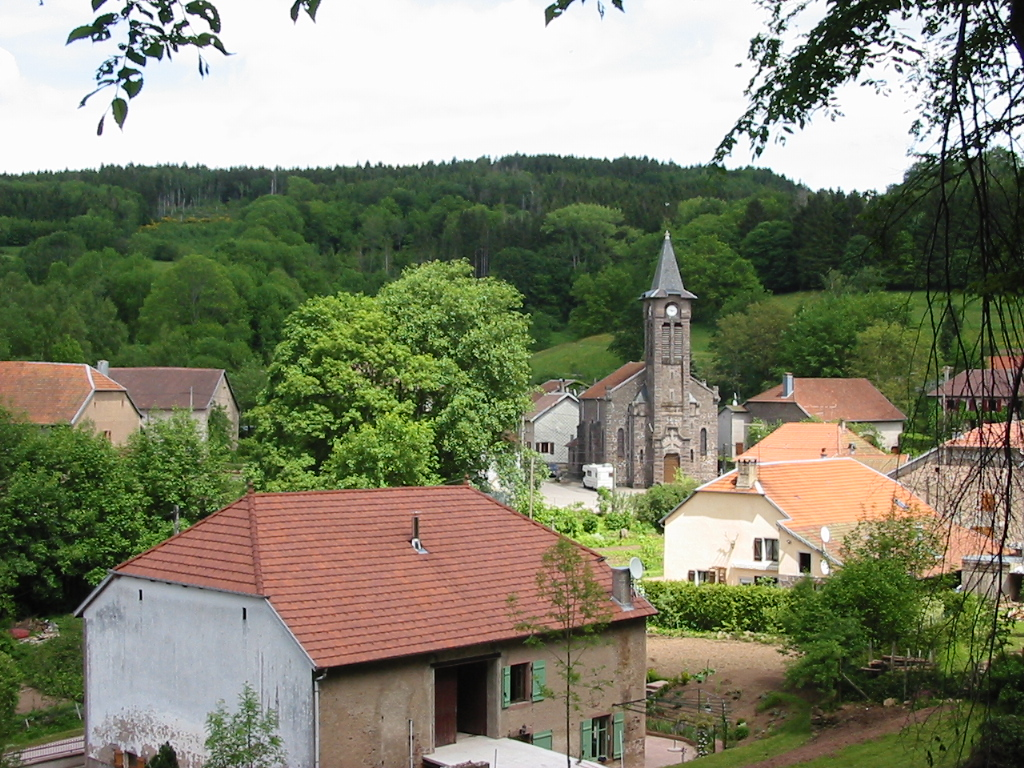
- A general view of Châtas
- Location of Châtas
- Location within France Location within Grand Est
- Coordinates: 48°21′46″N 7°02′09″E
- Country: France
- Region: Grand Est
- Department: Vosges
- Arrondissement: Saint-Dié-des-Vosges
- Canton: Raon-l'Étape
- Intercommunality: CA Saint-Dié-des-Vosges

Government
  - Mayor (2020–2026): Brigitte Gamain
- Area^{1}: 5.55 km^{2} (2.14 sq mi)
- Elevation: 565 m (1,854 ft)
- Highest elevation: 806 m (2,644 ft)
- Lowest elevation: 463 m (1,519 ft)
- Population (2023): 34
  - Density: 6.1/km^{2} (16/sq mi)
- Time zone: UTC+01:00 (CET)
  - Summer (DST): UTC+02:00 (CEST)
- INSEE/Postal code: 88093 /88210
- ^{1} French Land Register data, which excludes lakes, ponds, glaciers > 1 km^{2} (0.386 sq mi or 247 acres) and river estuaries.

Châtas (French pronunciation: [ʃata]) is a commune in the Vosges department in Grand Est in northeastern France.

== See also ==
- Communes of the Vosges department
