= Pierre Humbourg =

French journalist and writer (1901–1969)

- Born: 22 December 1901; Senones, Vosges
- Died: 21 August 1969 (aged 67); Paris
- Occupations: Novelist; Journalist

Pierre Humbourg (22 December 1901 – 21 August 1969) was a 20th-century French journalist and writer.

== Biography ==
Pierre Humbourg is the son of Paul Adrien Humbourg, infantry captain. He spent his childhood in the village of Gandelu in the Aisne department with his brother André and his sister Régine. His grandfather introduced him to painting. His father died at the beginning of the war in 1914 at the age of 49; Pierre was sent to the Prytanée national militaire at La Flèche. At the age of 18, he entered the hydrographic school at Marseilles. He settled in this city two years later.

== Selected bibliography ==
- 1927: Escale, Nouvelle Revue Française, Prix Rencontre
- 1929: Feux éteints
- 1929: L’Homme qui n’a jamais vu le Printemps
- 1929: Silvestre le Simple
- 1930: Aux Mains des Innocents
- 1931: Tempête
- 1932: Impasse
- 1947: Le miroir sans tain, Éditions Gallimard, Prix Cazes 1948
- 1950: Le bar de minuit passé
- 1951: L’Histoire des Autres
- 1955: Les Sentiers de l'automne
- 1958: Le Prince Consort, Gallimard
- 1959: Les Sentiers de l’Automne, Gallimard
- 1959: Lord Byron et les femmes, Gallimard
- 1960: Par une nuit sans Lune
