= La Salle, Vosges =

La Salle
- Commune
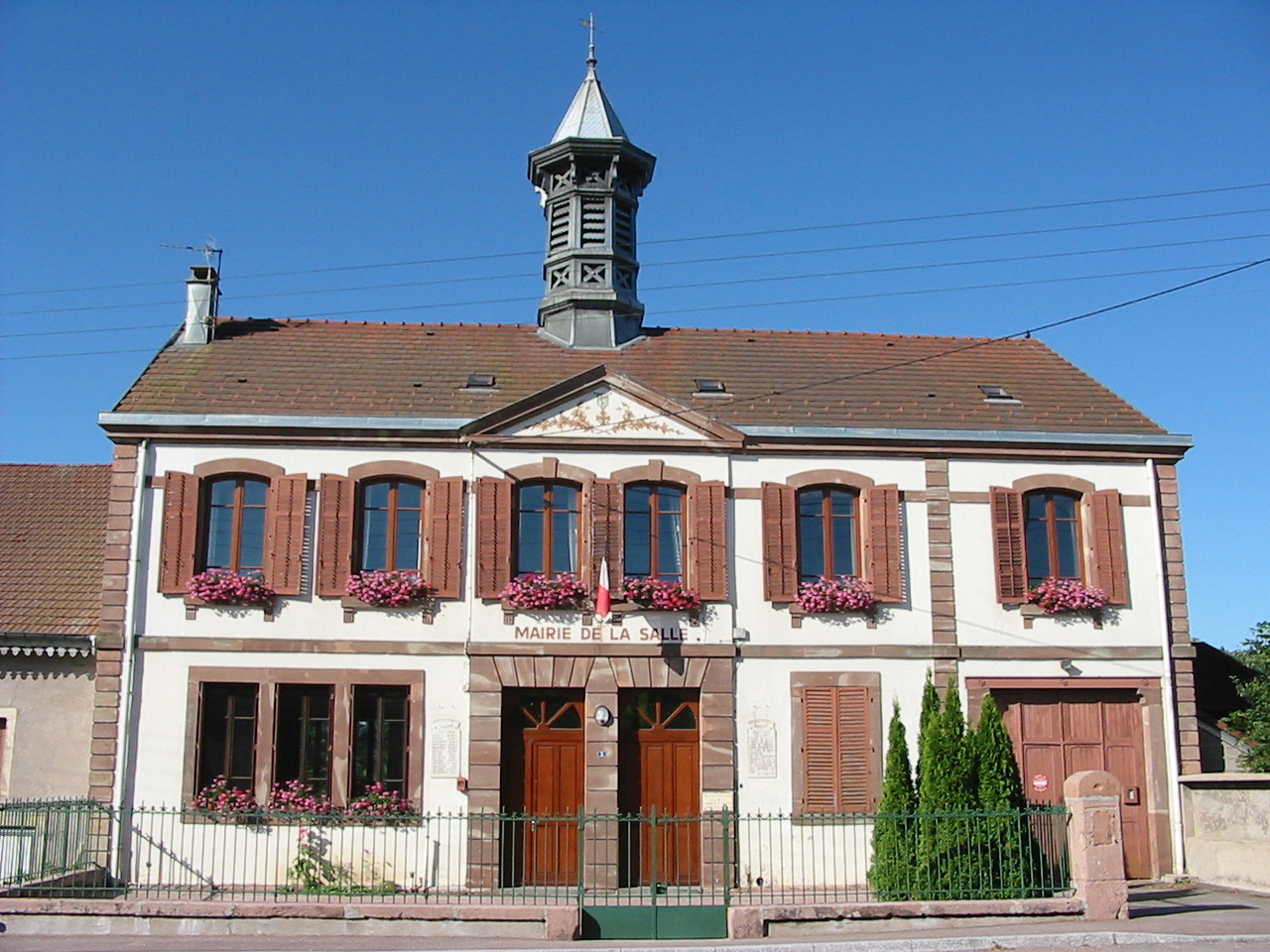
- The town hall in La Salle
- Location of La Salle
- Location within France Location within Grand Est
- Coordinates: 48°19′26″N 6°49′39″E
- Country: France
- Region: Grand Est
- Department: Vosges
- Arrondissement: Saint-Dié-des-Vosges
- Canton: Saint-Dié-des-Vosges-1
- Intercommunality: CA Saint-Dié-des-Vosges

Government
  - Mayor (2022–2026): Jean-Michel Grandmaire
- Area^{1}: 4.71 km^{2} (1.82 sq mi)
- Elevation: 365 m (1,198 ft)
- Highest elevation: 528 m (1,732 ft)
- Lowest elevation: 336 m (1,102 ft)
- Population (2023): 401
  - Density: 85.1/km^{2} (221/sq mi)
- Time zone: UTC+01:00 (CET)
  - Summer (DST): UTC+02:00 (CEST)
- INSEE/Postal code: 88438 /88470
- ^{1} French Land Register data, which excludes lakes, ponds, glaciers > 1 km^{2} (0.386 sq mi or 247 acres) and river estuaries.

La Salle (French pronunciation: [la sal]) is a commune in the Vosges department in Grand Est in northeastern France.

== See also ==
- Communes of the Vosges department
