= Canton of Raon-l'Étape =

Coordinates: 48°24′8″N 6°49′49″E

Raon-l'Étape
- Canton
- Country: France
- Region: Grand Est
- Department: Vosges
- No. of communes: {{{nbcomm}}}
- Area: 455.20 km^{2} (175.75 sq mi)
- Population (2023): 22,786
  - Density: 50.057/km^{2} (129.65/sq mi)
- INSEE code: 88 11

The Canton of Raon-l'Étape is a French administrative and electoral grouping of communes in the Vosges département of eastern France and in the region of Grand Est. The canton has its administrative centre at Raon-l'Étape.

== Composition ==
At the French canton reorganisation which came into effect in March 2015, the canton was expanded from 9 to 40 communes:

- Allarmont
- Anglemont
- Ban-de-Sapt
- Bazien
- Belval
- Brû
- Celles-sur-Plaine
- Châtas
- Denipaire
- Domptail
- Doncières
- Étival-Clairefontaine
- Grandrupt
- Hurbache
- Luvigny
- Ménarmont
- Ménil-de-Senones
- Ménil-sur-Belvitte
- Le Mont
- Moussey
- Moyenmoutier
- Nompatelize
- Nossoncourt
- La Petite-Raon
- Le Puid
- Raon-l'Étape
- Raon-sur-Plaine
- Roville-aux-Chênes
- Saint-Benoît-la-Chipotte
- Sainte-Barbe
- Saint-Jean-d'Ormont
- Saint-Pierremont
- Saint-Remy
- Saint-Stail
- Le Saulcy
- Senones
- Le Vermont
- Vexaincourt
- Vieux-Moulin
- Xaffévillers
