= La Voivre, Vosges =

La Voivre
- Commune
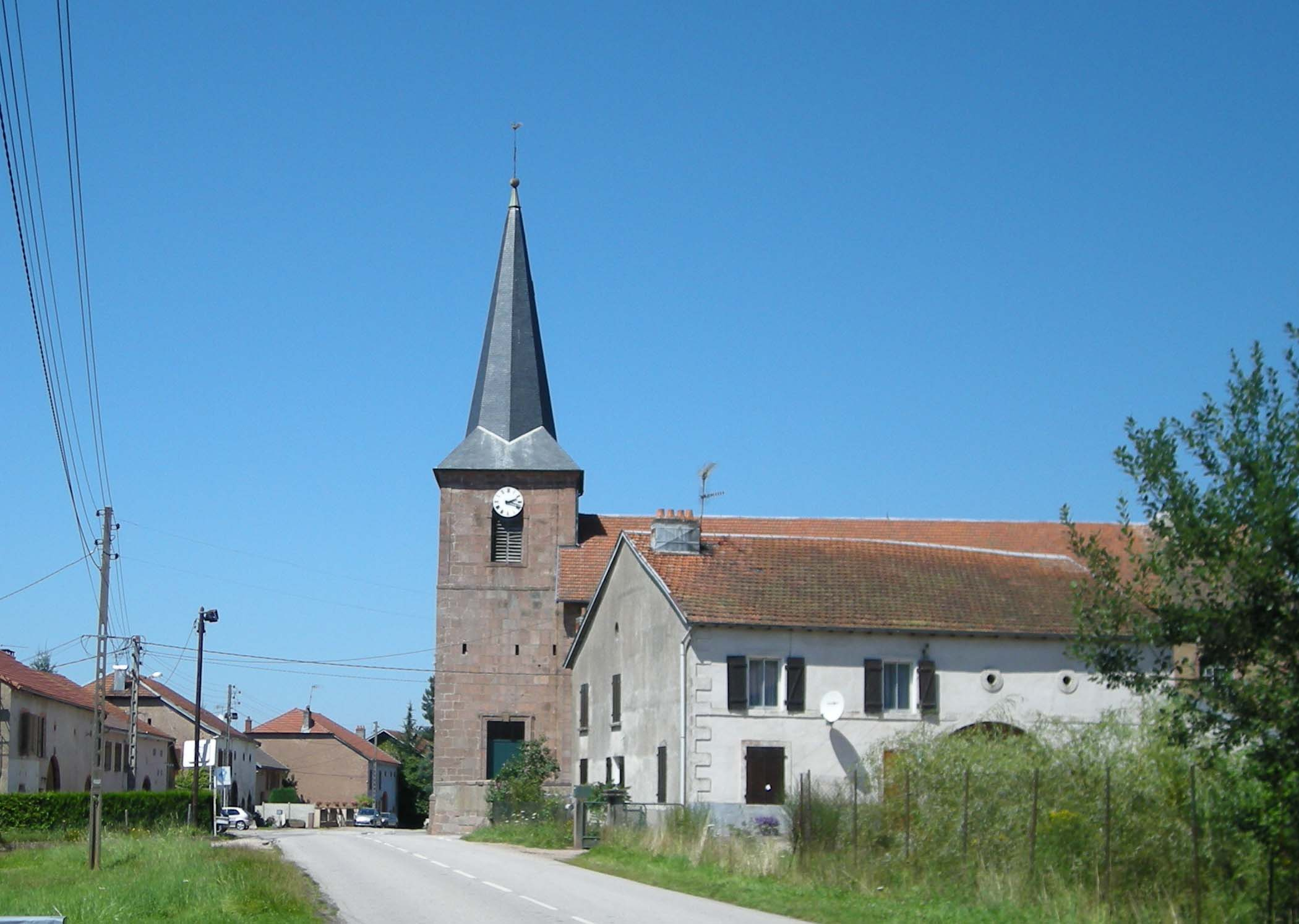
- Church of the Assumption
- Location of La Voivre
- Location within France Location within Grand Est
- Coordinates: 48°20′03″N 6°54′01″E
- Country: France
- Region: Grand Est
- Department: Vosges
- Arrondissement: Saint-Dié-des-Vosges
- Canton: Saint-Dié-des-Vosges-1
- Intercommunality: CA Saint-Dié-des-Vosges

Government
  - Mayor (2020–2026): Bernard Ropp
- Area^{1}: 5.86 km^{2} (2.26 sq mi)
- Elevation: 360 m (1,180 ft)
- Highest elevation: 380 m (1,250 ft)
- Lowest elevation: 300 m (980 ft)
- Population (2023): 648
  - Density: 111/km^{2} (286/sq mi)
- Time zone: UTC+01:00 (CET)
  - Summer (DST): UTC+02:00 (CEST)
- INSEE/Postal code: 88519 /88470
- ^{1} French Land Register data, which excludes lakes, ponds, glaciers > 1 km^{2} (0.386 sq mi or 247 acres) and river estuaries.

La Voivre (French pronunciation: [la vwavʁ]) is a commune in the Vosges department in Grand Est in northeastern France.

== See also ==
- Communes of the Vosges department
