= Ban-de-Sapt =

- Commune
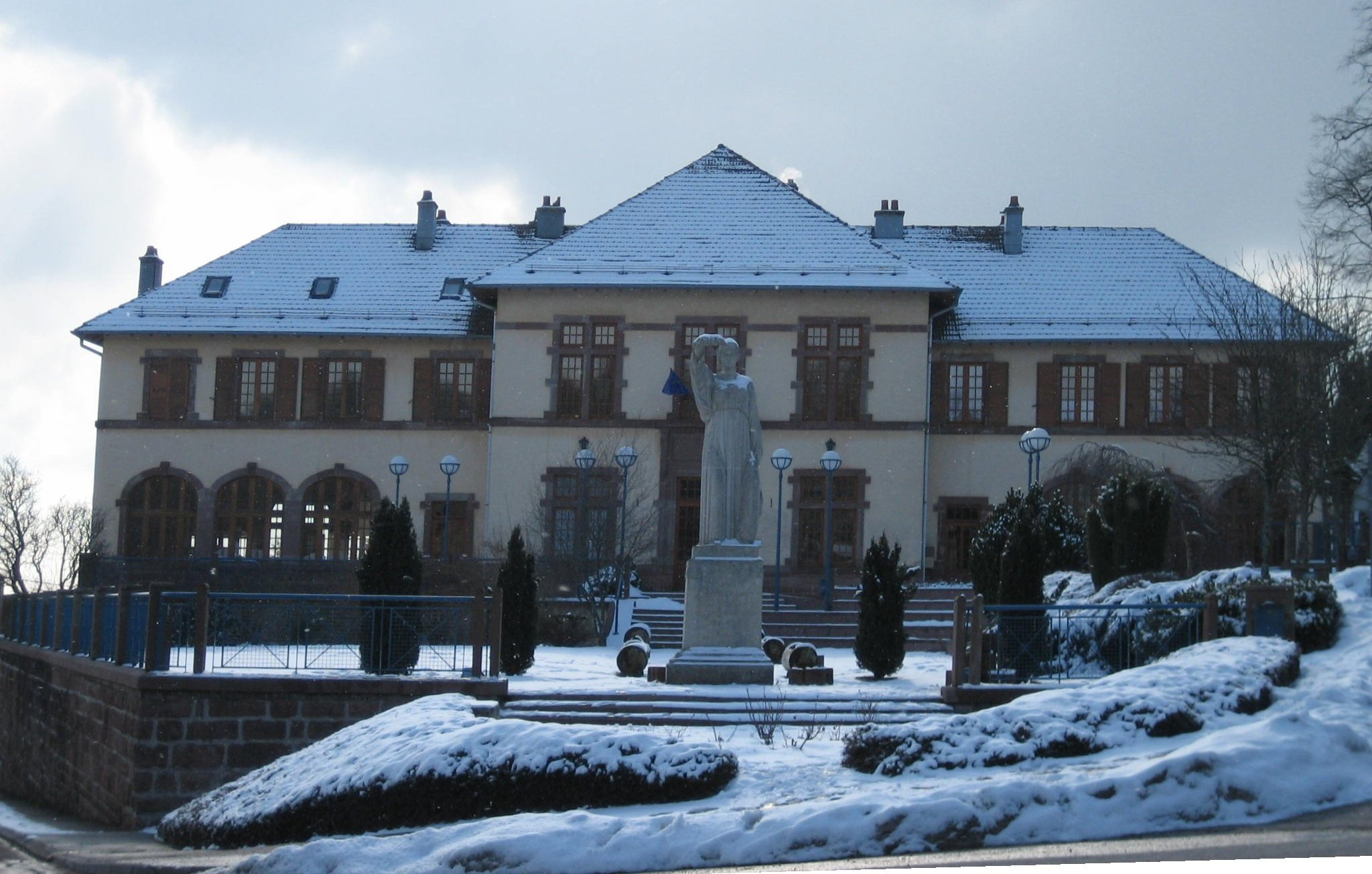
- The town hall in Ban-de-Sapt
- Location of Ban-de-Sapt
- Location within France Location within Grand Est
- Coordinates: 48°20′37″N 7°00′52″E
- Country: France
- Region: Grand Est
- Department: Vosges
- Arrondissement: Saint-Dié-des-Vosges
- Canton: Raon-l'Étape
- Intercommunality: CA Saint-Dié-des-Vosges

Government
  - Mayor (2020–2026): Serge Alem
- Area^{1}: 22.66 km^{2} (8.75 sq mi)
- Elevation: 550 m (1,800 ft)
- Highest elevation: 888 m (2,913 ft)
- Lowest elevation: 421 m (1,381 ft)
- Population (2023): 360
  - Density: 16/km^{2} (41/sq mi)
- Time zone: UTC+01:00 (CET)
  - Summer (DST): UTC+02:00 (CEST)
- INSEE/Postal code: 88033 /88210
- ^{1} French Land Register data, which excludes lakes, ponds, glaciers > 1 km^{2} (0.386 sq mi or 247 acres) and river estuaries.

Ban-de-Sapt (French pronunciation: [bɑ̃ də sa]) is a commune in the Vosges department in Grand Est in northeastern France.

== Points of interest ==
- Jardins de Callunes

== See also ==
- Communes of the Vosges department
- Hantzbahn
