= Senones, Vosges =

Senones
- Commune
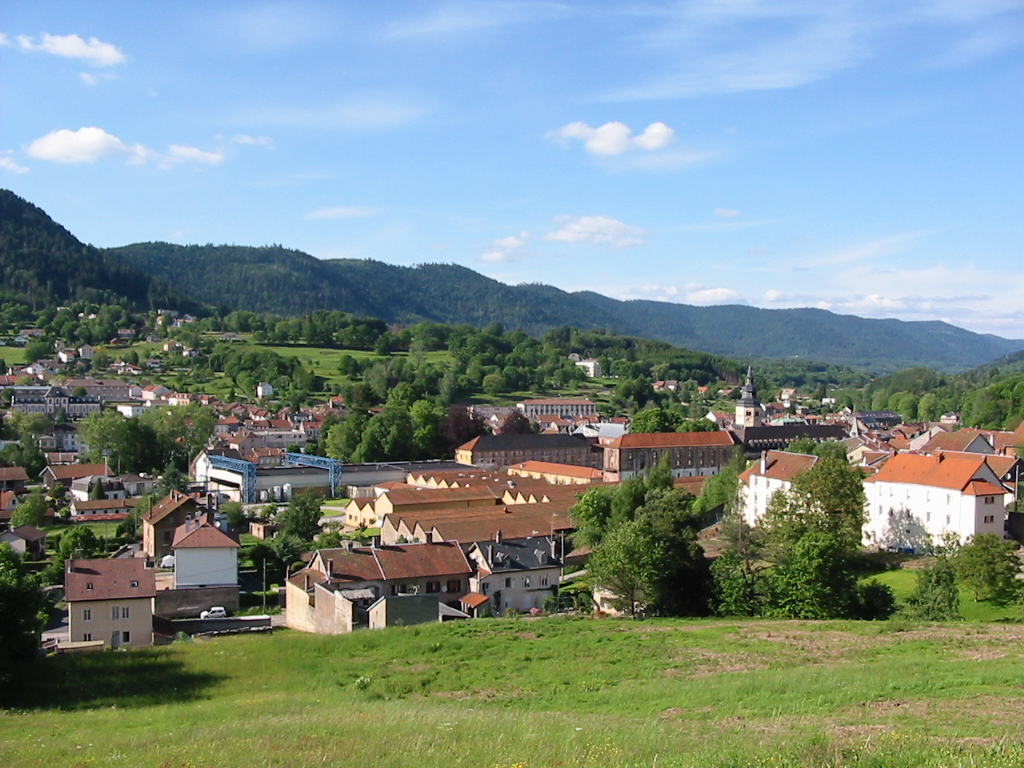
- View of the center of Senones

- Coat of arms
- Location of Senones
- Location within France Location within Grand Est
- Coordinates: 48°24′N 6°59′E
- Country: France
- Region: Grand Est
- Department: Vosges
- Arrondissement: Saint-Dié-des-Vosges
- Canton: Raon-l'Étape
- Intercommunality: CA Saint-Dié-des-Vosges

Government
  - Mayor (2020–2026): Jean-Luc Bévérina
- Area^{1}: 18.73 km^{2} (7.23 sq mi)
- Elevation: 340 m (1,120 ft)
- Highest elevation: 722 m (2,369 ft)
- Lowest elevation: 328 m (1,076 ft)
- Population (2023): 2,205
  - Density: 117.7/km^{2} (304.9/sq mi)
- Time zone: UTC+01:00 (CET)
  - Summer (DST): UTC+02:00 (CEST)
- INSEE/Postal code: 88451 /88210
- Website: www.senones.fr
- ^{1} French Land Register data, which excludes lakes, ponds, glaciers > 1 km^{2} (0.386 sq mi or 247 acres) and river estuaries.

Senones (French pronunciation: [sənɔn]) is a commune in the Vosges department in Grand Est in northeastern France. It is the location of the former Senones Abbey, founded around 640. The belltower of the abbey church dates from the 12th century; most of the other surviving buildings date from the 18th and 19th centuries.

Until 1793, Senones was the capital of the Principality of Salm-Salm. The journalist and writer Pierre Humbourg (1901–1969), winner of the 1948 Prix Cazes, was born in Senones.

== Population ==
Historical population
Year	Pop.	±% p.a.
1968	4,015	—
1975	3,882	−0.48%
1982	3,427	−1.77%
1990	3,157	−1.02%
1999	2,906	−0.92%
2007	2,772	−0.59%
2012	2,513	−1.94%
2017	2,464	−0.39%
2023	2,205	−1.83%
Source: INSEE

== See also ==
- Communes of the Vosges department
