= Luvigny =

- Commune
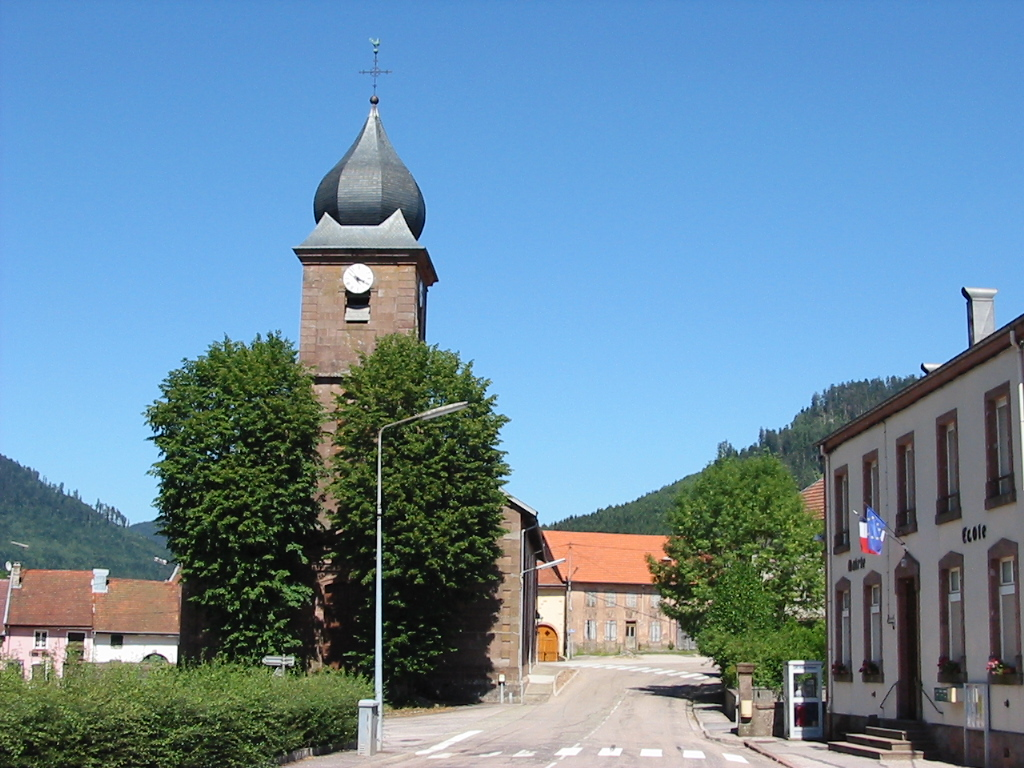
- The church and town hall in Luvigny
- Location of Luvigny
- Location within France Location within Grand Est
- Coordinates: 48°30′06″N 7°04′11″E
- Country: France
- Region: Grand Est
- Department: Vosges
- Arrondissement: Saint-Dié-des-Vosges
- Canton: Raon-l'Étape
- Intercommunality: CA Saint-Dié-des-Vosges

Government
  - Mayor (2020–2026): Guillaume Prunier
- Area^{1}: 3.94 km^{2} (1.52 sq mi)
- Elevation: 430 m (1,410 ft)
- Highest elevation: 810 m (2,660 ft)
- Lowest elevation: 375 m (1,230 ft)
- Population (2023): 123
  - Density: 31.2/km^{2} (80.9/sq mi)
- Time zone: UTC+01:00 (CET)
  - Summer (DST): UTC+02:00 (CEST)
- INSEE/Postal code: 88277 /88110
- ^{1} French Land Register data, which excludes lakes, ponds, glaciers > 1 km^{2} (0.386 sq mi or 247 acres) and river estuaries.

Luvigny (French pronunciation: [lyviɲi]) is a commune in the Vosges department in Grand Est in northeastern France.

== See also ==
- Communes of the Vosges department
