= Le Saulcy =

- Commune
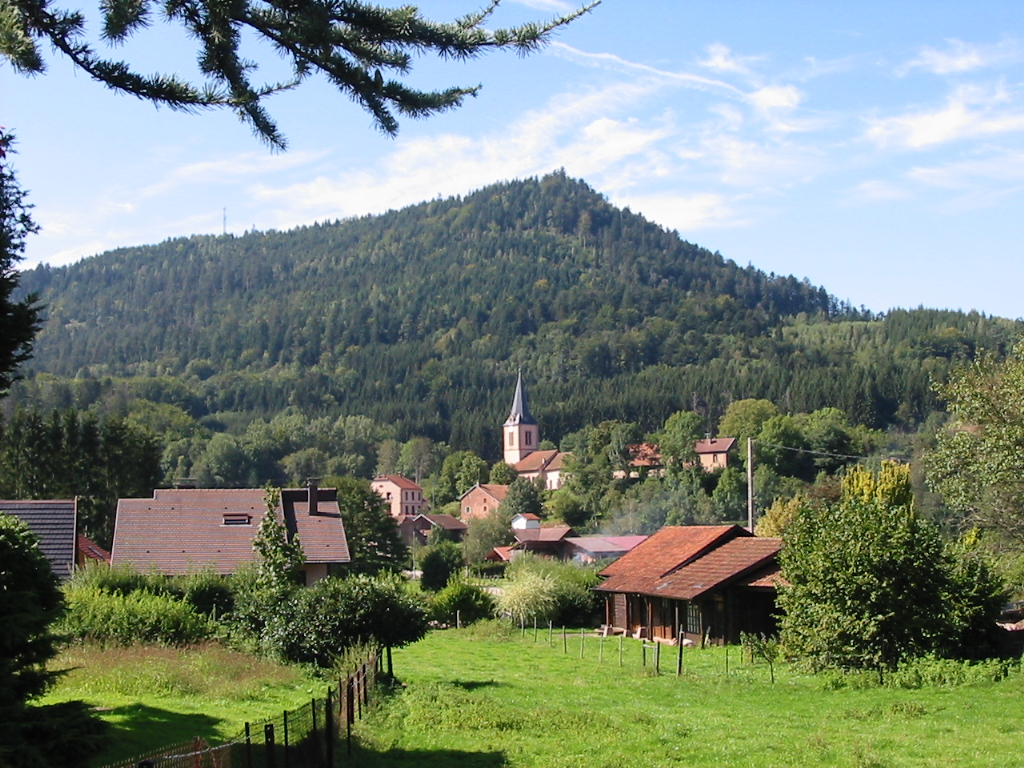
- A general view of Le Saulcy
- Location of Le Saulcy
- Location within France Location within Grand Est
- Coordinates: 48°24′51″N 7°02′34″E
- Country: France
- Region: Grand Est
- Department: Vosges
- Arrondissement: Saint-Dié-des-Vosges
- Canton: Raon-l'Étape
- Intercommunality: CA Saint-Dié-des-Vosges

Government
  - Mayor (2020–2026): Jean-Luc Audouin
- Area^{1}: 9.83 km^{2} (3.80 sq mi)
- Elevation: 450 m (1,480 ft)
- Highest elevation: 910 m (2,990 ft)
- Lowest elevation: 395 m (1,296 ft)
- Population (2023): 293
  - Density: 29.8/km^{2} (77.2/sq mi)
- Time zone: UTC+01:00 (CET)
  - Summer (DST): UTC+02:00 (CEST)
- INSEE/Postal code: 88444 /88210
- ^{1} French Land Register data, which excludes lakes, ponds, glaciers > 1 km^{2} (0.386 sq mi or 247 acres) and river estuaries.

Le Saulcy (French pronunciation: [lə so(l)si]) is a commune in the Vosges department in Grand Est in northeastern France.

== History ==
In the nearby hamlet of Le Harcholet, a war crime was committed by Waffen SS forces under the command of Oberscharfuhrer Max Kessler. Three members of an SAS infiltration team (including Lieutenant Silly and Trooper Brown) were burnt alive whilst bound by German forces in an abandoned barn. The three soldiers had been caught attempting to cross the River Meurthe whilst trying to reach the Allied lines on 10 October 1944 after the termination of Operation Loyton, an attempt to inspire a French uprising in the Vosges to pave the way for an offensive by General Patton's Seventh Army.

== See also ==
- Communes of the Vosges department
