= Le Vermont =

- Commune
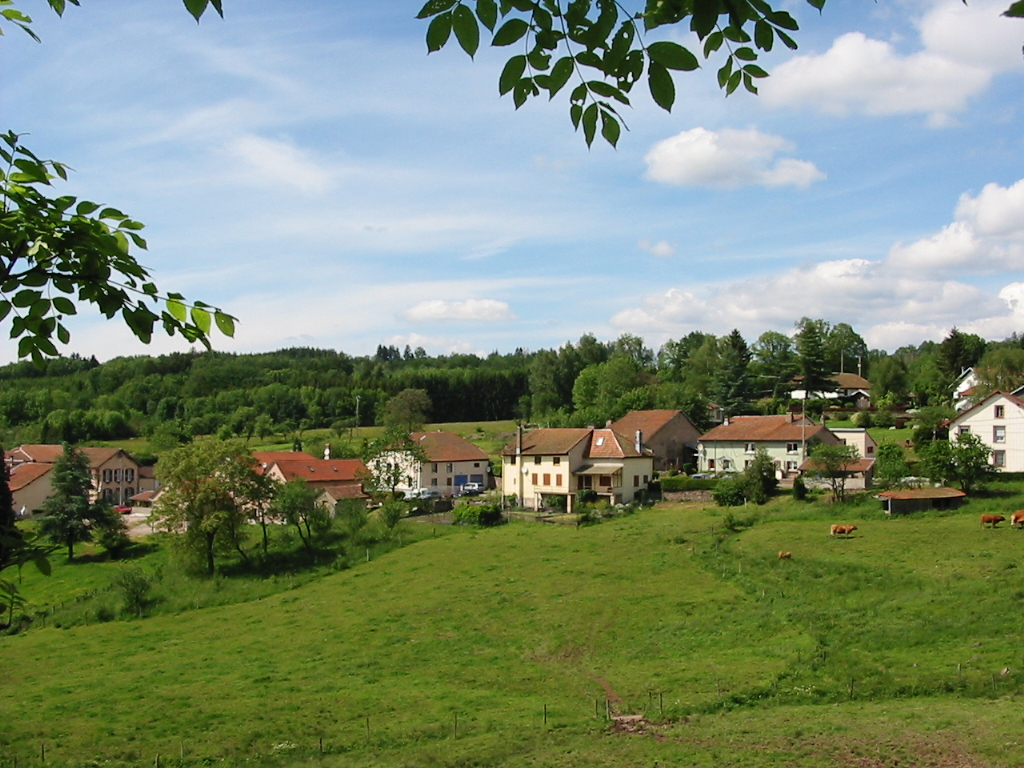
- A general view of Le Vermont
- Location of Le Vermont
- Location within France Location within Grand Est
- Coordinates: 48°23′14″N 7°03′28″E
- Country: France
- Region: Grand Est
- Department: Vosges
- Arrondissement: Saint-Dié-des-Vosges
- Canton: Raon-l'Étape
- Intercommunality: CA Saint-Dié-des-Vosges

Government
  - Mayor (2020–2026): Jean-Georges Koeller
- Area^{1}: 4.41 km^{2} (1.70 sq mi)
- Elevation: 600 m (2,000 ft)
- Highest elevation: 812 m (2,664 ft)
- Lowest elevation: 458 m (1,503 ft)
- Population (2023): 72
  - Density: 16/km^{2} (42/sq mi)
- Time zone: UTC+01:00 (CET)
  - Summer (DST): UTC+02:00 (CEST)
- INSEE/Postal code: 88501 /88210
- ^{1} French Land Register data, which excludes lakes, ponds, glaciers > 1 km^{2} (0.386 sq mi or 247 acres) and river estuaries.

Le Vermont (French pronunciation: [lə vɛʁmɔ̃]) is a commune in the Vosges department of the Grand Est region of northeastern France.

== See also ==
- Communes of the Vosges department
