= Le Mont, Vosges =

Le Mont
- Commune
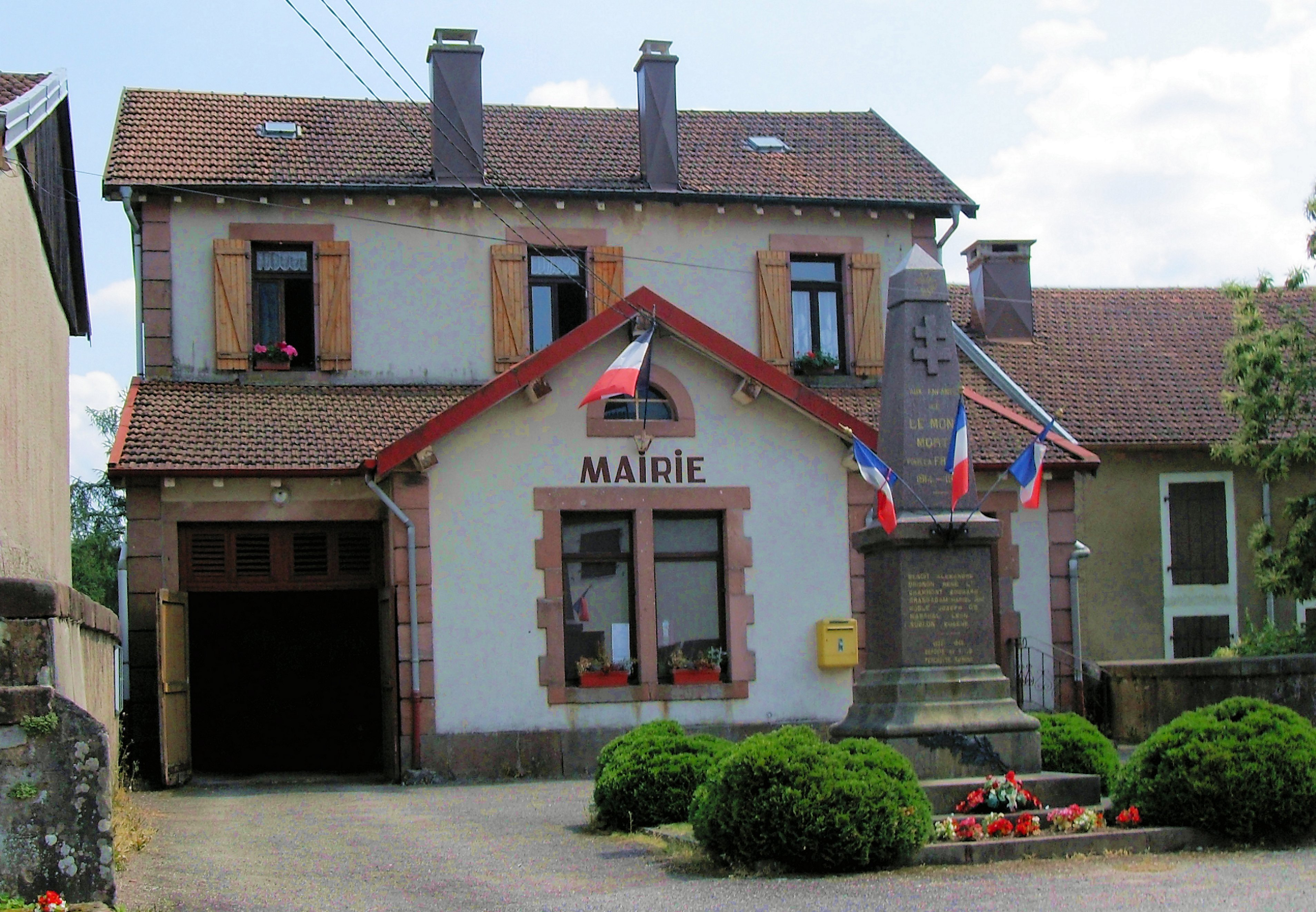
- The town hall in Le Mont
- Location of Le Mont
- Location within France Location within Grand Est
- Coordinates: 48°24′36″N 7°01′40″E
- Country: France
- Region: Grand Est
- Department: Vosges
- Arrondissement: Saint-Dié-des-Vosges
- Canton: Raon-l'Étape
- Intercommunality: CA Saint-Dié-des-Vosges

Government
  - Mayor (2020–2026): Patrick Herriot
- Area^{1}: 4.01 km^{2} (1.55 sq mi)
- Elevation: 435 m (1,427 ft)
- Highest elevation: 730 m (2,400 ft)
- Lowest elevation: 397 m (1,302 ft)
- Population (2023): 53
  - Density: 13/km^{2} (34/sq mi)
- Time zone: UTC+01:00 (CET)
  - Summer (DST): UTC+02:00 (CEST)
- INSEE/Postal code: 88306 /88210
- ^{1} French Land Register data, which excludes lakes, ponds, glaciers > 1 km^{2} (0.386 sq mi or 247 acres) and river estuaries.

Le Mont (French pronunciation: [lə mɔ̃]) is a commune in the Vosges department in Grand Est in northeastern France.

== Geography ==
Le Mont is a semi-mountainous commune on the eastern edge of Grand Est, halfway between Senones and the Hantz Pass. The little River Boucard, a tributary of the Rabodeau, flows through the village. The name of the commune refers to an isolated sandstone hillock which lies within the commune, and which is 730 metres above sea level at its summit.

== History ==
Like its neighbouring communes, Le Mont was part of the Principality of Salm-Salm until 1793.

== See also ==
- Communes of the Vosges department
