= Étival-Clairefontaine =

- Commune
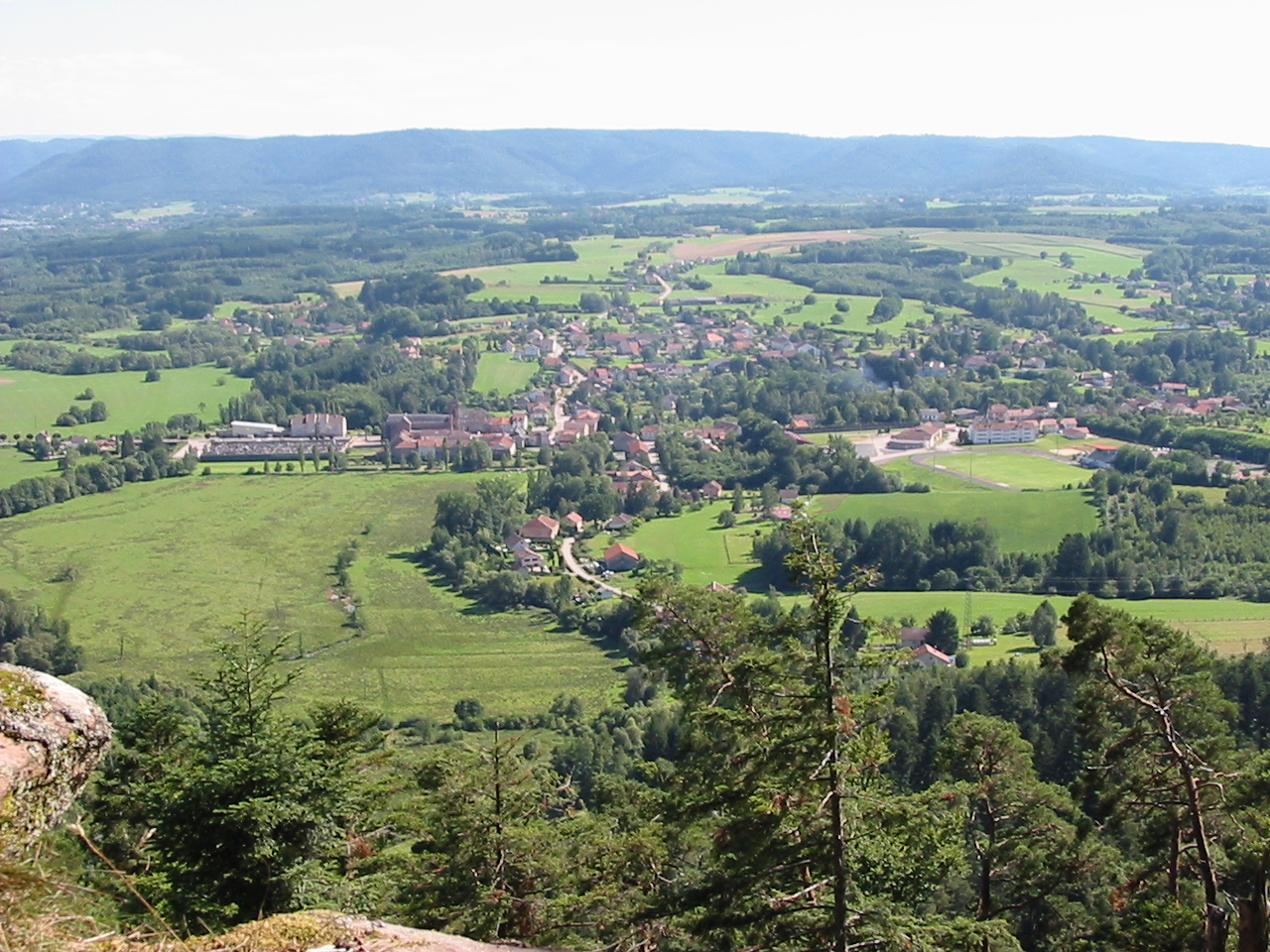
- General view from Pierre d'Appel

- Coat of arms
- Location of Étival-Clairefontaine
- Location within France Location within Grand Est
- Coordinates: 48°21′53″N 6°51′32″E
- Country: France
- Region: Grand Est
- Department: Vosges
- Arrondissement: Saint-Dié-des-Vosges
- Canton: Raon-l'Étape
- Intercommunality: CA Saint-Dié-des-Vosges

Government
  - Mayor (2020–2026): Aurélien Bansept
- Area^{1}: 27.12 km^{2} (10.47 sq mi)
- Elevation: 302 m (991 ft)
- Highest elevation: 591 m (1,939 ft)
- Lowest elevation: 285 m (935 ft)
- Population (2023): 2,437
  - Density: 89.86/km^{2} (232.7/sq mi)
- Time zone: UTC+01:00 (CET)
  - Summer (DST): UTC+02:00 (CEST)
- INSEE/Postal code: 88165 /88480
- ^{1} French Land Register data, which excludes lakes, ponds, glaciers > 1 km^{2} (0.386 sq mi or 247 acres) and river estuaries.

Étival-Clairefontaine (French pronunciation: [etival klɛʁfɔ̃tɛn]) is a commune in the Vosges department in Grand Est in northeastern France.

The Clairefontaine Paper Mill is located in this city.

The origins of Sanctivagium, altered in medieval Latin as Stivagium and Estival Old French, date back to the 7th century.

== Population ==
Historical population
Year	Pop.	±% p.a.
1968	2,305	—
1975	2,240	−0.41%
1982	2,231	−0.06%
1990	2,328	+0.53%
1999	2,401	+0.34%
2007	2,421	+0.10%
2012	2,588	+1.34%
2017	2,616	+0.22%
2023	2,437	−1.17%
Source: INSEE

== See also ==
- Communes of the Vosges department
