= Le Puid =

- Commune
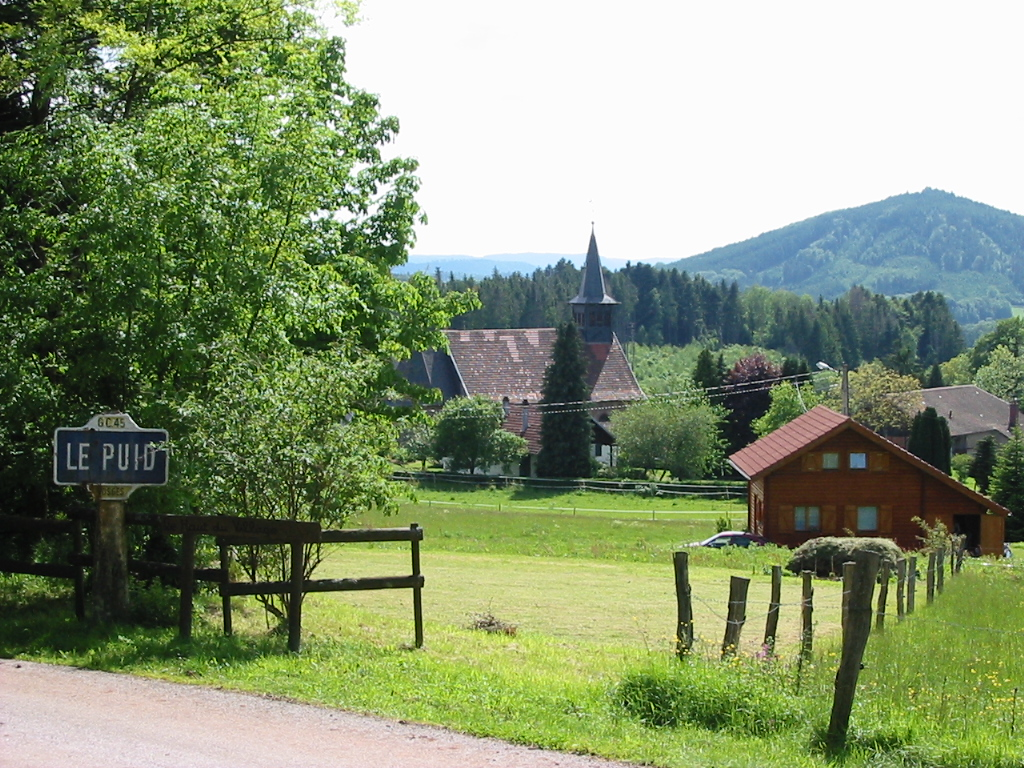
- The church and surroundings in Le Puid
- Location of Le Puid
- Location within France Location within Grand Est
- Coordinates: 48°23′37″N 7°02′28″E
- Country: France
- Region: Grand Est
- Department: Vosges
- Arrondissement: Saint-Dié-des-Vosges
- Canton: Raon-l'Étape
- Intercommunality: CA Saint-Dié-des-Vosges

Government
  - Mayor (2020–2026): Régine Thomas Chinouilh
- Area^{1}: 5.41 km^{2} (2.09 sq mi)
- Highest elevation: 643 m (2,110 ft)
- Lowest elevation: 400 m (1,300 ft)
- Population (2023): 116
  - Density: 21.4/km^{2} (55.5/sq mi)
- Time zone: UTC+01:00 (CET)
  - Summer (DST): UTC+02:00 (CEST)
- INSEE/Postal code: 88362 /88210
- ^{1} French Land Register data, which excludes lakes, ponds, glaciers > 1 km^{2} (0.386 sq mi or 247 acres) and river estuaries.

Le Puid (French pronunciation: [lə pɥi]) is a commune in the Vosges department in Grand Est in northeastern France.

The inhabitants of Le Puid are called Piedestains.

== History ==
Until 1793 Le Puid was part of the Principality of Salm-Salm.

== See also ==
- Communes of the Vosges department
