= Belval, Vosges =

Belval
- Commune
- Location of Belval
- Location within France Location within Grand Est
- Coordinates: 48°24′36″N 7°03′10″E
- Country: France
- Region: Grand Est
- Department: Vosges
- Arrondissement: Saint-Dié-des-Vosges
- Canton: Raon-l'Étape
- Intercommunality: CA Saint-Dié-des-Vosges

Government
  - Mayor (2020–2026): Francis Altan
- Area^{1}: 6.84 km^{2} (2.64 sq mi)
- Highest elevation: 905 m (2,969 ft)
- Lowest elevation: 455 m (1,493 ft)
- Population (2023): 148
  - Density: 21.6/km^{2} (56.0/sq mi)
- Time zone: UTC+01:00 (CET)
  - Summer (DST): UTC+02:00 (CEST)
- INSEE/Postal code: 88053 /88210
- ^{1} French Land Register data, which excludes lakes, ponds, glaciers > 1 km^{2} (0.386 sq mi or 247 acres) and river estuaries.

Belval (French pronunciation: [bɛlval]) is a commune in the Vosges department in Grand Est in northeastern France.

== See also ==
- Communes of the Vosges department
