= Ménil-de-Senones =

- Commune
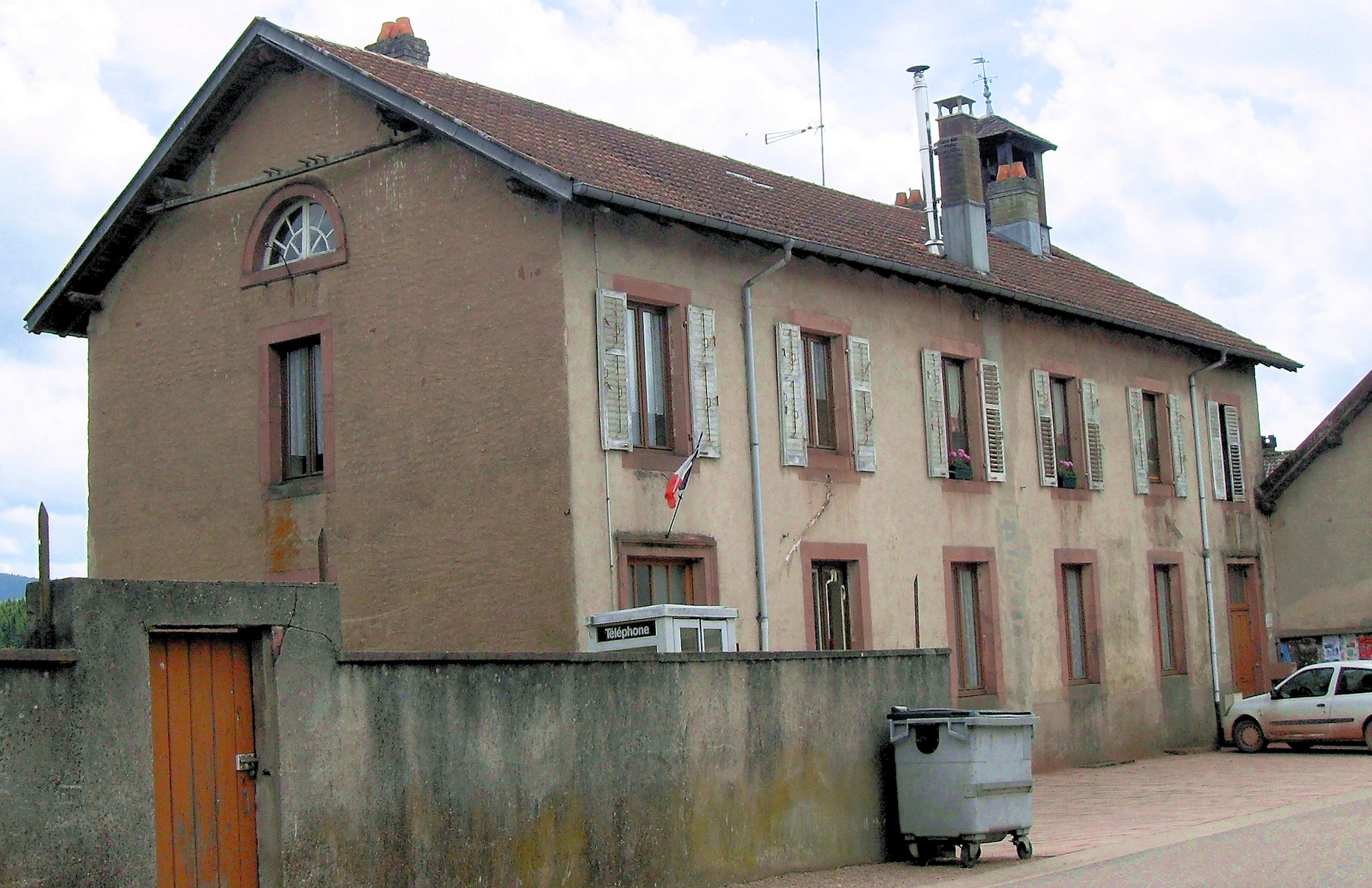
- The town hall in Ménil-de-Senones
- Location of Ménil-de-Senones
- Location within France Location within Grand Est
- Coordinates: 48°22′39″N 6°59′46″E
- Country: France
- Region: Grand Est
- Department: Vosges
- Arrondissement: Saint-Dié-des-Vosges
- Canton: Raon-l'Étape
- Intercommunality: CA Saint-Dié-des-Vosges

Government
  - Mayor (2020–2026): Daniel Lallemand
- Area^{1}: 7.22 km^{2} (2.79 sq mi)
- Elevation: 560 m (1,840 ft)
- Highest elevation: 690 m (2,260 ft)
- Lowest elevation: 380 m (1,250 ft)
- Population (2023): 121
  - Density: 16.8/km^{2} (43.4/sq mi)
- Time zone: UTC+01:00 (CET)
  - Summer (DST): UTC+02:00 (CEST)
- INSEE/Postal code: 88300 /88210
- ^{1} French Land Register data, which excludes lakes, ponds, glaciers > 1 km^{2} (0.386 sq mi or 247 acres) and river estuaries.

Ménil-de-Senones (French pronunciation: [menil də sənɔn]) is a commune in the Vosges department in Grand Est in northeastern France.

The name Ménil-de-Senones dates only from August 1961, before which the commune was called Ménil. The name was officially changed in order to reduce the risk of confusion with another Vosges commune called Le Ménil.

== See also ==
- Communes of the Vosges department
