= Grandrupt =

- Commune
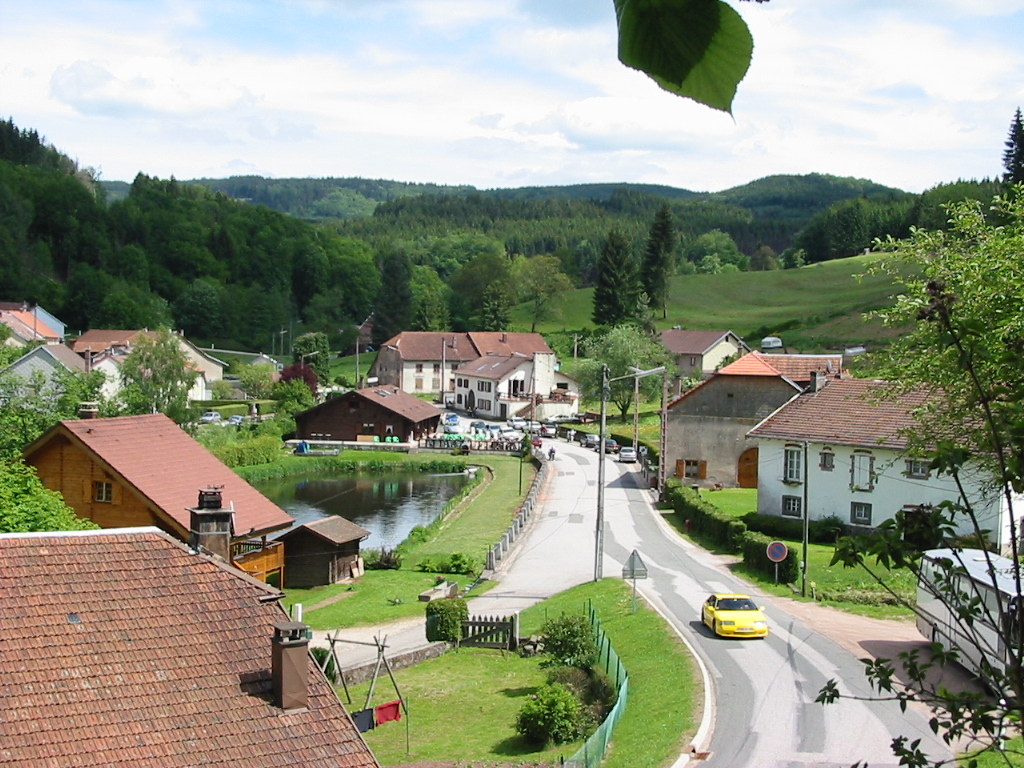
- A general view of Grandrupt
- Location of Grandrupt
- Location within France Location within Grand Est
- Coordinates: 48°22′22″N 7°03′31″E
- Country: France
- Region: Grand Est
- Department: Vosges
- Arrondissement: Saint-Dié-des-Vosges
- Canton: Raon-l'Étape
- Intercommunality: CA Saint-Dié-des-Vosges

Government
  - Mayor (2020–2026): Christian Harenza
- Area^{1}: 6.34 km^{2} (2.45 sq mi)
- Elevation: 525 m (1,722 ft)
- Highest elevation: 807 m (2,648 ft)
- Lowest elevation: 450 m (1,480 ft)
- Population (2023): 74
  - Density: 12/km^{2} (30/sq mi)
- Time zone: UTC+01:00 (CET)
  - Summer (DST): UTC+02:00 (CEST)
- INSEE/Postal code: 88215 /88210
- ^{1} French Land Register data, which excludes lakes, ponds, glaciers > 1 km^{2} (0.386 sq mi or 247 acres) and river estuaries.

Grandrupt (French pronunciation: [ɡʁɑ̃ʁy]) is a commune in the Vosges department in Grand Est in northeastern France.

== See also ==
- Communes of the Vosges department
