= Allarmont =

- Commune
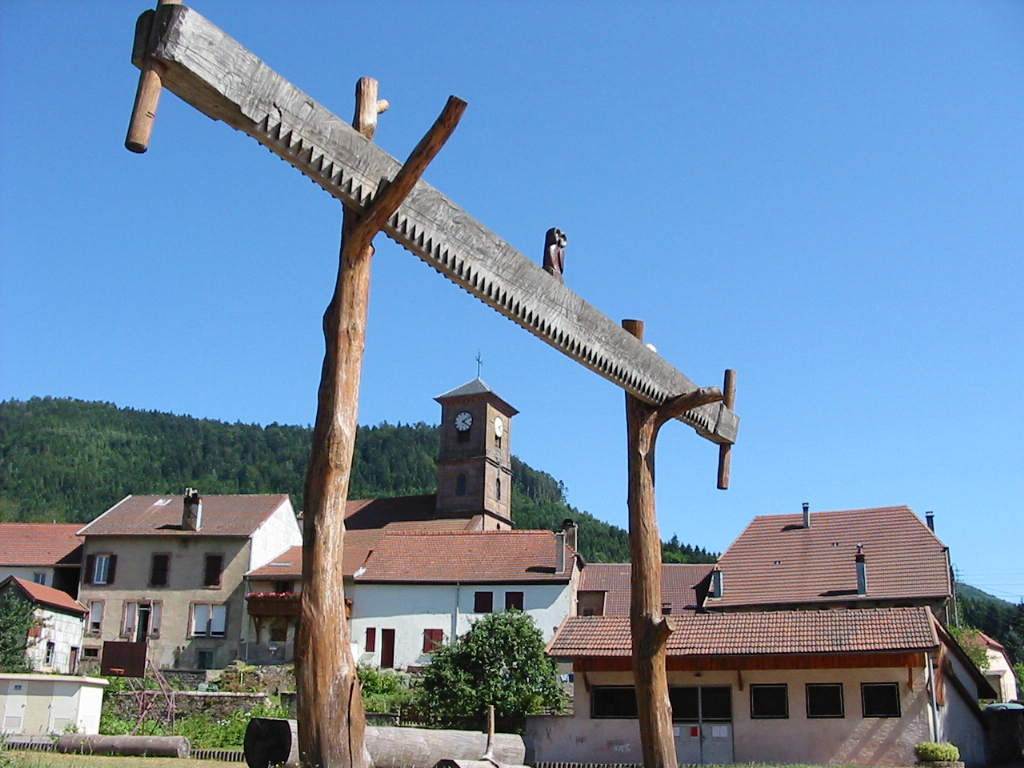
- A two-man saw sculpture in Allarmont

- Coat of arms
- Location of Allarmont
- Location within France Location within Grand Est
- Coordinates: 48°28′59″N 7°00′51″E
- Country: France
- Region: Grand Est
- Department: Vosges
- Arrondissement: Saint-Dié-des-Vosges
- Canton: Raon-l'Étape
- Intercommunality: Saint-Dié-des-Vosges

Government
  - Mayor (2020–2026): Pierre Sarrazin
- Area^{1}: 13.21 km^{2} (5.10 sq mi)
- Elevation: 350 m (1,150 ft)
- Highest elevation: 813 m (2,667 ft)
- Lowest elevation: 332 m (1,089 ft)
- Population (2023): 214
  - Density: 16.2/km^{2} (42.0/sq mi)
- Time zone: UTC+01:00 (CET)
  - Summer (DST): UTC+02:00 (CEST)
- INSEE/Postal code: 88005 /88110
- ^{1} French Land Register data, which excludes lakes, ponds, glaciers > 1 km^{2} (0.386 sq mi or 247 acres) and river estuaries.

Allarmont (French pronunciation: [alaʁmɔ̃]; German: Allhartsberg) is a commune in the Vosges department in Grand Est in northeastern France.

== Population ==
Historical population
Year	Pop.	±% p.a.
1968	317	—
1975	265	−2.53%
1982	206	−3.53%
1990	246	+2.24%
1999	271	+1.08%
2007	246	−1.20%
2012	229	−1.42%
2017	211	−1.62%
2023	214	+0.24%
Source: INSEE

== See also ==
- Communes of the Vosges department
