= Communauté d'agglomération de Saint-Dié-des-Vosges =

Coordinates: 48.2855°N 6.9511°E

Saint-Dié-des-Vosges
- Communauté d'agglomération
- Country: France
- Region: Grand Est
- Department: Meurthe-et-Moselle, Vosges
- No. of communes: {{{nbcomm}}}
- Established: 2017
- Area: 979.9 km^{2} (378.3 sq mi)
- Population (2018): 74,926
  - Density: 76.46/km^{2} (198.0/sq mi)

The Communauté d'agglomération de Saint-Dié-des-Vosges is an administrative association of communes in the Vosges and Meurthe-et-Moselle departments of eastern France. It was created on 1 January 2017 by the merger of the former Communauté de communes de Saint-Dié-des-Vosges, Communauté de communes de la Vallée de la Plaine, Communauté de communes des Hauts Champs, Communauté de communes du Pays des Abbayes, Communauté de communes du Val de Neuné and Communauté de communes de la Fave, Meurthe, Galilée. On 1 January 2018 it gained 3 communes from the Communauté de communes Bruyères - Vallons des Vosges. It consists of 77 communes, and has its administrative offices at Saint-Dié-des-Vosges. Its area is 979.9 km^{2}. Its population was 74,926 in 2018, of which 19,724 in Saint-Dié-des-Vosges proper.

== Composition ==
The communauté d'agglomération consists of the following 77 communes, of which 74 in the Vosges department and 3 (Bionville, Pierre-Percée and Raon-lès-Leau) in Meurthe-et-Moselle:

1. Allarmont
2. Anould
3. Arrentès-de-Corcieux
4. Ban-de-Laveline
5. Ban-de-Sapt
6. Ban-sur-Meurthe-Clefcy
7. Barbey-Seroux
8. Belval
9. Bertrimoutier
10. Le Beulay
11. Biffontaine
12. Bionville
13. Bois-de-Champ
14. La Bourgonce
15. Celles-sur-Plaine
16. La Chapelle-devant-Bruyères
17. Châtas
18. Coinches
19. Combrimont
20. Corcieux
21. La Croix-aux-Mines
22. Denipaire
23. Entre-deux-Eaux
24. Étival-Clairefontaine
25. Fraize
26. Frapelle
27. Gemaingoutte
28. Gerbépal
29. La Grande-Fosse
30. Grandrupt
31. La Houssière
32. Hurbache
33. Lesseux
34. Lubine
35. Lusse
36. Luvigny
37. Mandray
38. Ménil-de-Senones
39. Le Mont
40. Mortagne
41. Moussey
42. Moyenmoutier
43. Nayemont-les-Fosses
44. Neuvillers-sur-Fave
45. Nompatelize
46. Pair-et-Grandrupt
47. La Petite-Fosse
48. La Petite-Raon
49. Pierre-Percée
50. Plainfaing
51. Les Poulières
52. Provenchères-et-Colroy
53. Le Puid
54. Raon-lès-Leau
55. Raon-l'Étape
56. Raon-sur-Plaine
57. Raves
58. Remomeix
59. Les Rouges-Eaux
60. Saint-Dié-des-Vosges
61. Sainte-Marguerite
62. Saint-Jean-d'Ormont
63. Saint-Léonard
64. Saint-Michel-sur-Meurthe
65. Saint-Remy
66. Saint-Stail
67. La Salle
68. Le Saulcy
69. Saulcy-sur-Meurthe
70. Senones
71. Taintrux
72. Le Vermont
73. Vexaincourt
74. Vienville
75. Vieux-Moulin
76. La Voivre
77. Wisembach
