= Moussey, Vosges =

Moussey
- Commune
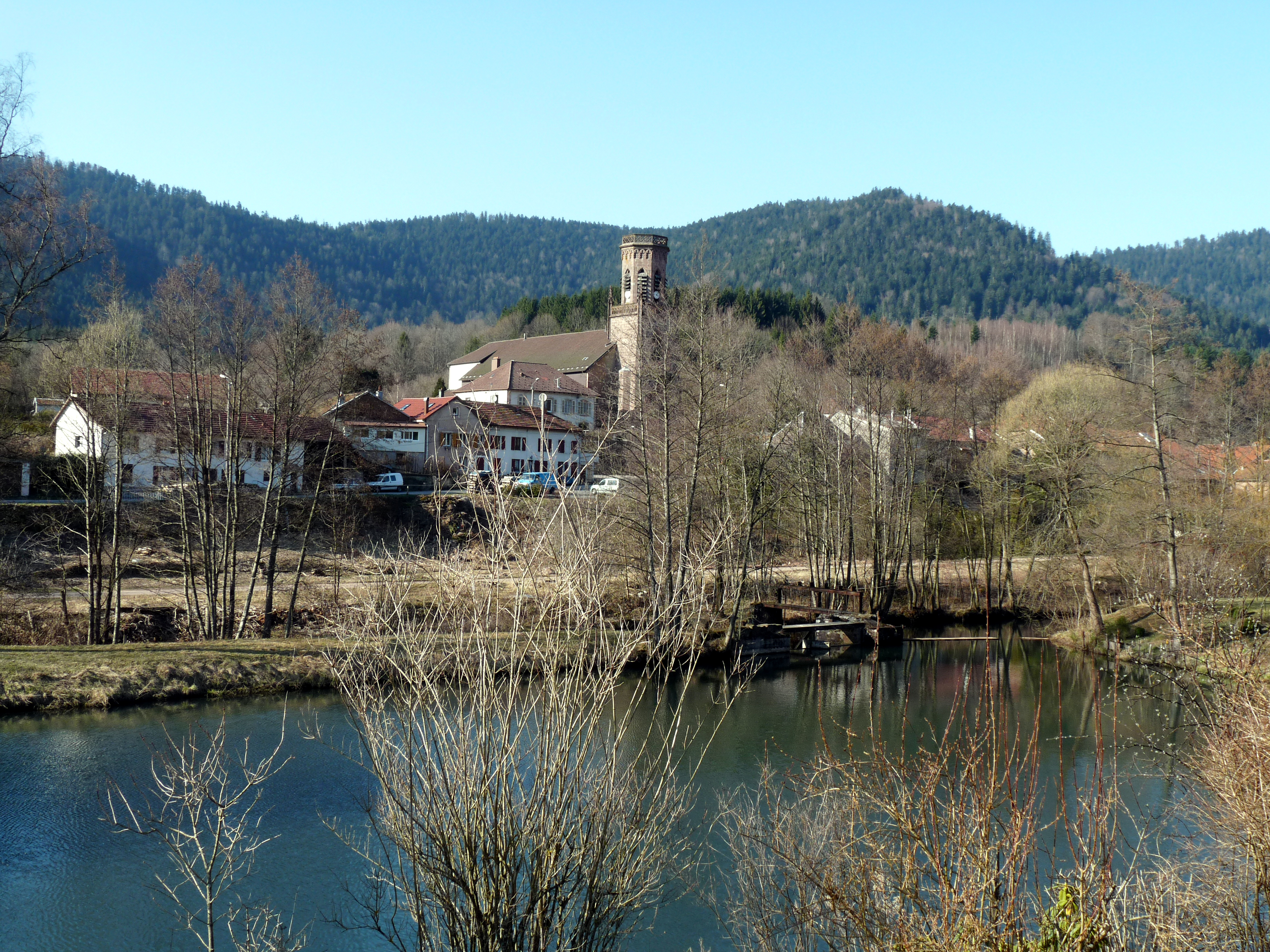
- A general view of Moussey

- Coat of arms
- Location of Moussey
- Location within France Location within Grand Est
- Coordinates: 48°25′51″N 7°01′25″E
- Country: France
- Region: Grand Est
- Department: Vosges
- Arrondissement: Saint-Dié-des-Vosges
- Canton: Raon-l'Étape
- Intercommunality: CA Saint-Dié-des-Vosges

Government
  - Mayor (2020–2026): Bertrand Klein
- Area^{1}: 29.2 km^{2} (11.3 sq mi)
- Elevation: 380 m (1,250 ft)
- Highest elevation: 933 m (3,061 ft)
- Lowest elevation: 360 m (1,180 ft)
- Population (2023): 548
  - Density: 18.8/km^{2} (48.6/sq mi)
- Time zone: UTC+01:00 (CET)
  - Summer (DST): UTC+02:00 (CEST)
- INSEE/Postal code: 88317 /88210
- ^{1} French Land Register data, which excludes lakes, ponds, glaciers > 1 km^{2} (0.386 sq mi or 247 acres) and river estuaries.

Moussey (French pronunciation: [musɛ]) is a commune in the Vosges department in Grand Est in northeastern France.

Inhabitants are called Mousséens.

== Geography ==
Positioned on the eastern side of Grand Est, the village of Moussey is the last inhabited settlement along the Senones Valley before, eventually, the road crosses the Prayé Pass (Col de Prayé) into Alsace and on to Mont Donon, the highest peak in the North Vosges Mountains.

== History ==
The name 'Moussey' comes from the Latin word 'Monticellus' meaning 'little mountain'. The village is set on a small hill at the foot of which a fast flowing mountain stream fully deserves its name, the River Rabondeau (in Latin, 'rapidus aqua' / 'fast water').

Moussey is one of several communes that formerly belonged to Senones Abbey: subsequently it fell within the Principality of Salm-Salm until the French Revolution, following which the former principality became a part of France. Numerous documents from the 18th century, now archived at the mairie testify to the way the princes of Salm-Salm were happy to accommodate the presence of such prominent religious scholars as Dom Calmet.

Fortune arrived Moussey in the 19th century thanks to the textile industry. The first textile mill was constructed in 1836: an adjoining chateau was built between 1858 and 1863. The business was operated successively by three families, being the Charlot, Lung et Laederich families, but in 1966 the machines fell silent. Since 1988 various surviving elements of the Moussey textile business have enjoyed protected historical monument status.

During the Second World War Moussey was a supporting town for the joint SAS-SOE Operation Loyton of 1944, designed to use Allied special forces to inspire an insurrection amongst the local Maquis forces and thus prepare the ground for offensive action by the American Seventh Army. The Allied forces were eventually forced to retreat, which in turn led to mass deportation from Moussey with 187 people being sent to Natzweiler-Struthof of whom 144 never returned. Among the deportees was the man who had been mayor since 1917 (Abel Gassman), the director general of the Laederich Business: Jules Py died at Dachau on 24 January 1945.

After the Second World War, Moussey was personally delivered a letter of thanks by Major Eric Barksworth and Colonel Christopher Sykes for their services towards the Special Air Service during the war. It praised the "selfless devotion" and "memorable courage" of the inhabitants of Moussey, especially in their collective refusal to expose the SAS unit concealed within the Senones Valley.

== See also ==
- Communes of the Vosges department
