= Vieux-Moulin, Vosges =

Vieux-Moulin
- Commune
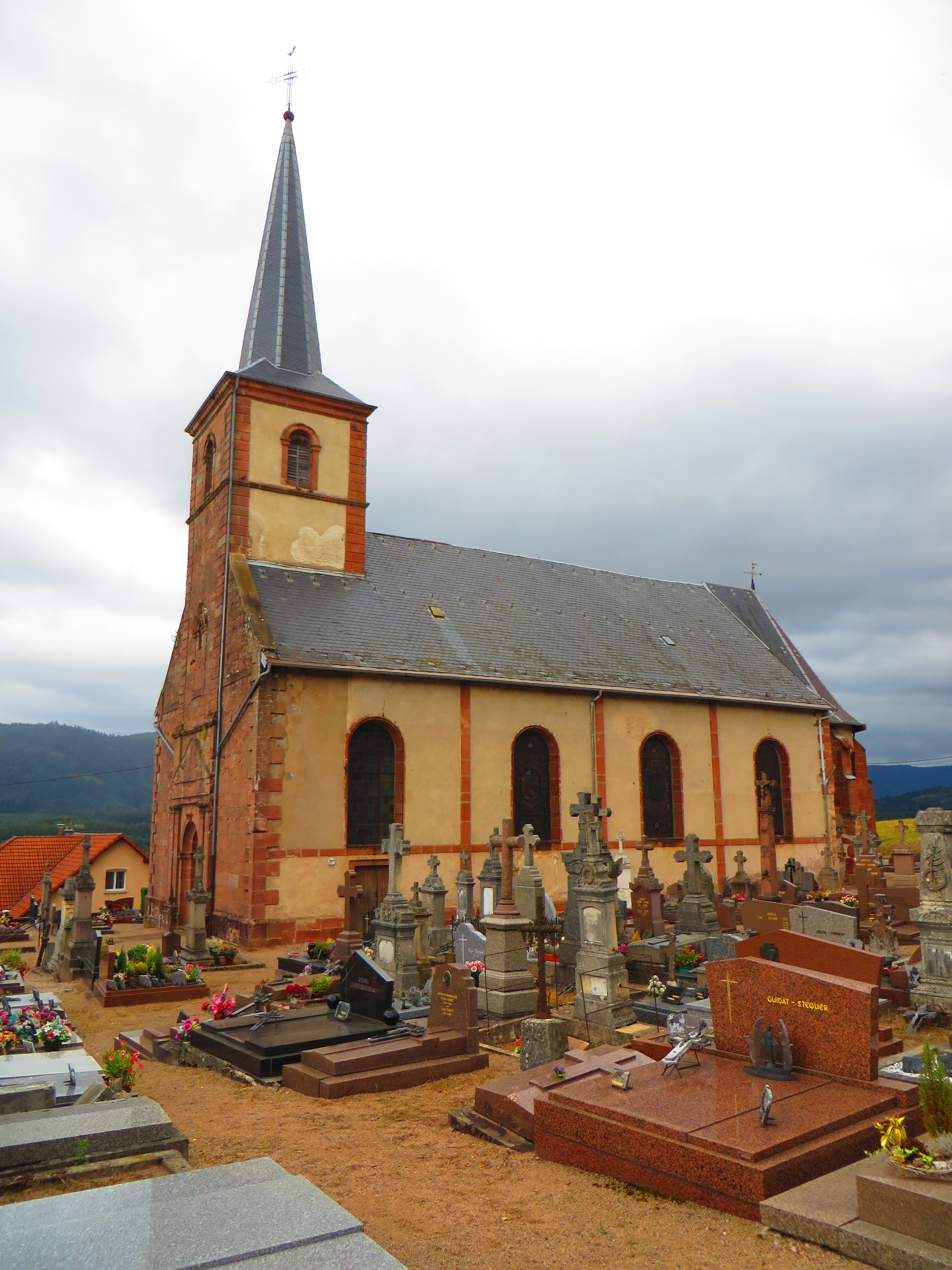
- The church in Vieux-Moulin

- Coat of arms
- Location of Vieux-Moulin
- Location within France Location within Grand Est
- Coordinates: 48°23′46″N 6°59′59″E
- Country: France
- Region: Grand Est
- Department: Vosges
- Arrondissement: Saint-Dié-des-Vosges
- Canton: Raon-l'Étape
- Intercommunality: CA Saint-Dié-des-Vosges

Government
  - Mayor (2020–2026): Jean-Louis Ropp
- Area^{1}: 3.89 km^{2} (1.50 sq mi)
- Elevation: 400 m (1,300 ft)
- Highest elevation: 512 m (1,680 ft)
- Lowest elevation: 355 m (1,165 ft)
- Population (2023): 326
  - Density: 83.8/km^{2} (217/sq mi)
- Time zone: UTC+01:00 (CET)
  - Summer (DST): UTC+02:00 (CEST)
- INSEE/Postal code: 88506 /88210
- ^{1} French Land Register data, which excludes lakes, ponds, glaciers > 1 km^{2} (0.386 sq mi or 247 acres) and river estuaries.

Vieux-Moulin (French pronunciation: [vjø mulɛ̃]) is a commune in the Vosges department in Grand Est in northeastern France.

== See also ==
- Communes of the Vosges department
