= Association of the Neuné Valley communes =

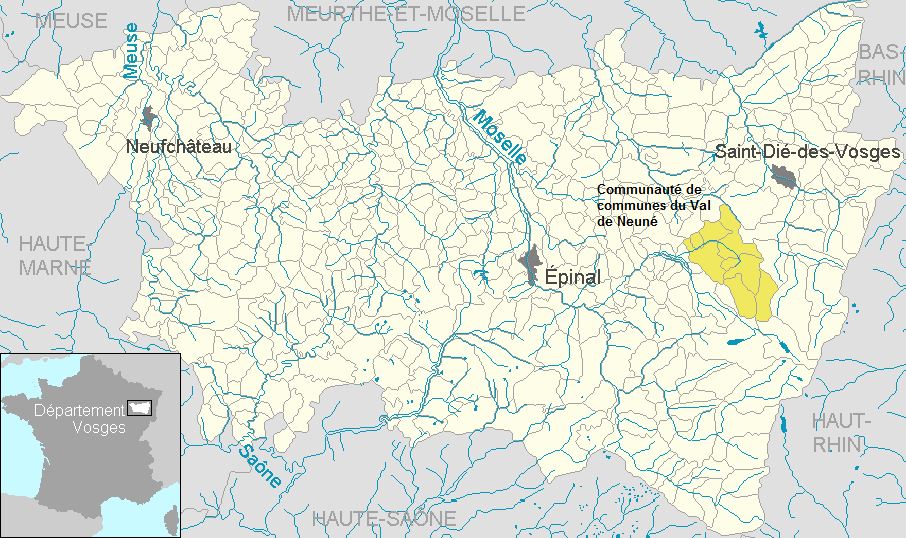
Community of municipalities of Val de Neuné in the Vosges department, Lorraine, France

The Association of the Neuné Valley communes (French: Communauté de communes du Val de Neuné) is a former administrative association of rural communes in the Vosges département of eastern France and in the region of Lorraine. It was created in December 2002. It was merged into the new Communauté d'agglomération de Saint-Dié-des-Vosges in January 2017. The association had its administrative offices at Corcieux. The grouping took its name from the river Neuné.

The Communauté de communes comprised the following communes:

- Arrentès-de-Corcieux
- Biffontaine
- La Chapelle-devant-Bruyères
- Corcieux
- Gerbépal
- La Houssière
- Les Poulières
- Vienville
