= Neuné =

River in France

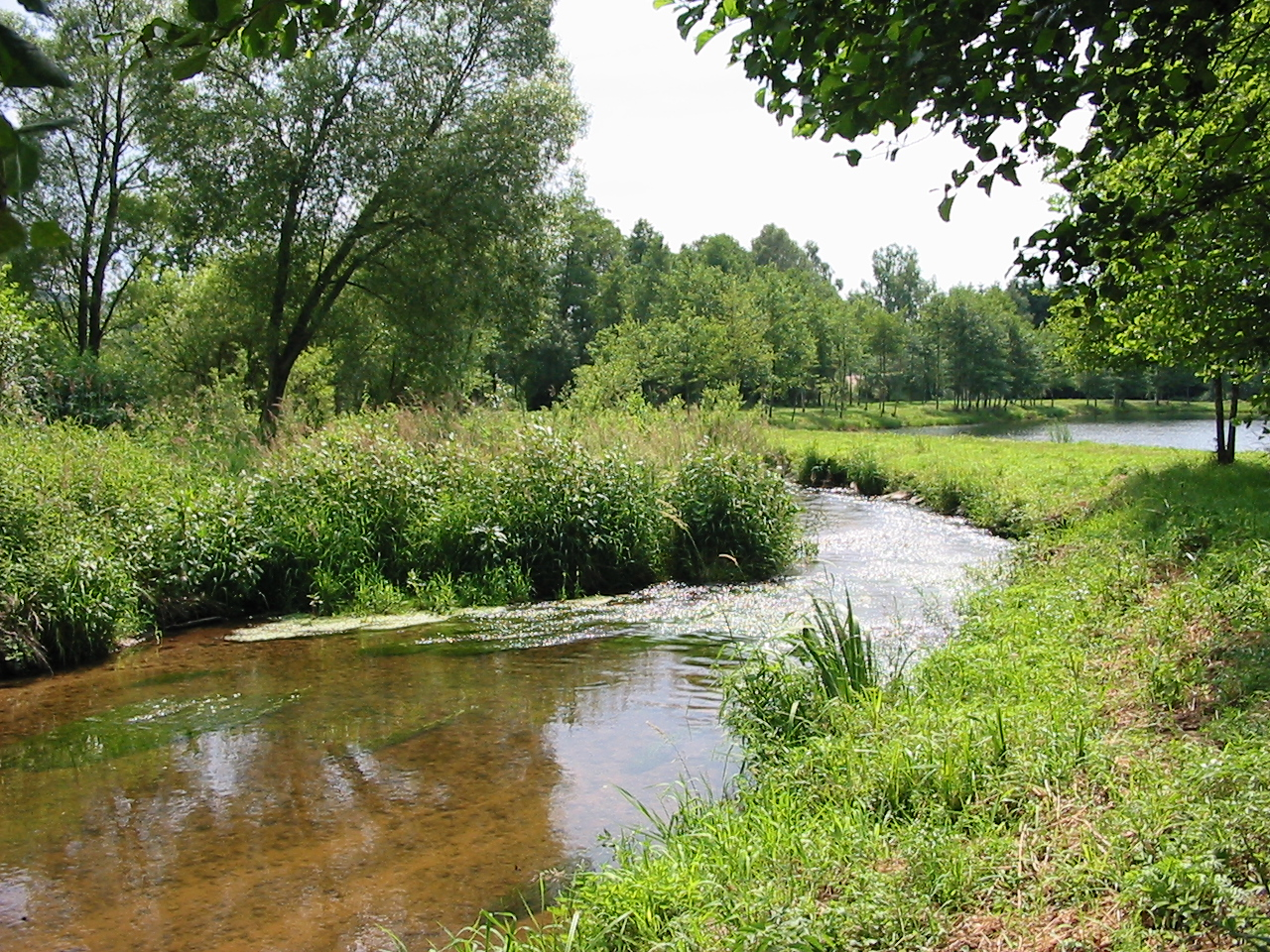
- Near the La Chapelle sandpits

- Location within France Location within Grand Est

Location
- Country: France

Physical characteristics
- Source
  - location: Gerbépal
- Mouth: Vologne
  - coordinates: 48.1852°N 6.7425°E
- Length: 24.5 km (15.2 mi)
- Basin size: 96.9 km^{2} (37.4 mi^{2})
- Discharge
  - average: 2.22 m^{3}/s (78 cu ft/s)

Basin features
- Progression: Vologne→ Moselle→ Rhine→ North Sea

The Neuné is a river which flows in the Vosges department of France. It is a right tributary of the Vologne, and therefore a sub-tributary of the Moselle. It is 24.5 km (15.2 mi) long.

== Geography ==
The Neuné rises within the commune of Gerbépal in the parc naturel régional des Ballons des Vosges, which also contains a part of its length. It flows first to the north-west, then towards the west, and finally towards the south-west where it joins the right bank of the Vologne, at the level of the small settlement of Champ-le-Duc. The Neuné's principal tributary is the B'Heumey, which joins with it in the commune of Chapelle-Devant-Bruyères.

== Communes on the course of the Neuné ==
The Neuné flows through the following communes, from upstream to downstream: Gerbépal, Corcieux, La Houssière, Biffontaine, les Poulières, la Chapelle-devant-Bruyères, Laveline-devant-Bruyères and Champ-le-Duc in the Vosges department.

Nonetheless, the communauté de communes du Val de Neuné grouping includes a slightly different set of communes: Gerbépal, Corcieux, Arrentès-de-Corcieux, La Houssière, Biffontaine, les Poulières, la Chapelle-devant-Bruyères, Vienville.

== Hydrology ==
Le Neuné is a substantial river. Its flow rate has been measured over a 22-year period (1986–2007) at Laveline-devant-Bruyères, which is slightly away from its confluence with the Vologne. The drainage surface studied is 94 square kilometres (36 mi^{2}), or 97 percent of the total watershed of the river.

The average interannual flow rate, or discharge of the river at Laveline-devant-Bruyères is 2.22 cubic metres per second (78 cu ft/s).

The Neuné exhibits moderate seasonal fluctuations in flow rate. The high-water period occurs in the winter season, with average monthly instantaneous flow rates varying between 2.63 and 3.59 cubic metres per second (93 and 127 cu ft/s) from November to March inclusive, with an overall maximum in March and a secondary maximum in January. From April onwards, the flow rate drops off quickly and continues until the low-water period, which occurs from July to September, with minimum monthly average instantaneous flow rate going down to 0.833 cubic metres per second (29.4 cu ft/s) in August, still a comfortable flow for a small river. Fluctuations in flow rate can be more significant from year to year and over short time periods.

At low water, the three-year low instantaneous flow rate can drop to 0.25 cubic metres per second (8.8 cu ft/s) in the case of a dry five-year period, or about 250 litres per second (66 USgal/s), which is not too severe.

As for floods, they can also substantial, considering the relatively small watershed. The instantaneous maximum flow rate over 2 years (IMFR2) and the IMFR5 are 21 and 28 cubic metres per second (740 and 990 cu ft/s) respectively. The IMFR10 is 32 cubic metres per second (1,100 cu ft/s) and the IMFR20 is 37 cubic metres per second (1,300 cu ft/s), while the IMFR50 has not been calculated due to an insufficient history of measurements. The volumes of the Neuné's floods rise to as much as 30 percent of those of the Vologne.

The maximum instantaneous flow rate recorded at Laveline-devant-Bruyères during this period was 36.3 cubic metres per second (1,280 cu ft/s) on 30 December 2001, while the maximum daily average flow rate was 32.6 cubic metres per second (1,150 cu ft/s) on 4 October 2006. Comparing the first of these numbers with the different IMFR measurements of the river suggests that this flood was of the order of a 20-year event.

The Neuné is a substantial river. The runoff curve number in its watershed is 746 millimetres (29.4 in) annually, which is over twice the overall average of France with all basins taken together, and clearly greater than the average of the French basin of the Moselle, which is 445 millimetres (17.5 in) downstream of Metz). The specific flow rate of the river attaches a solid number to this fact: 23.6 litres per second per square kilometre of basin.

== See also ==
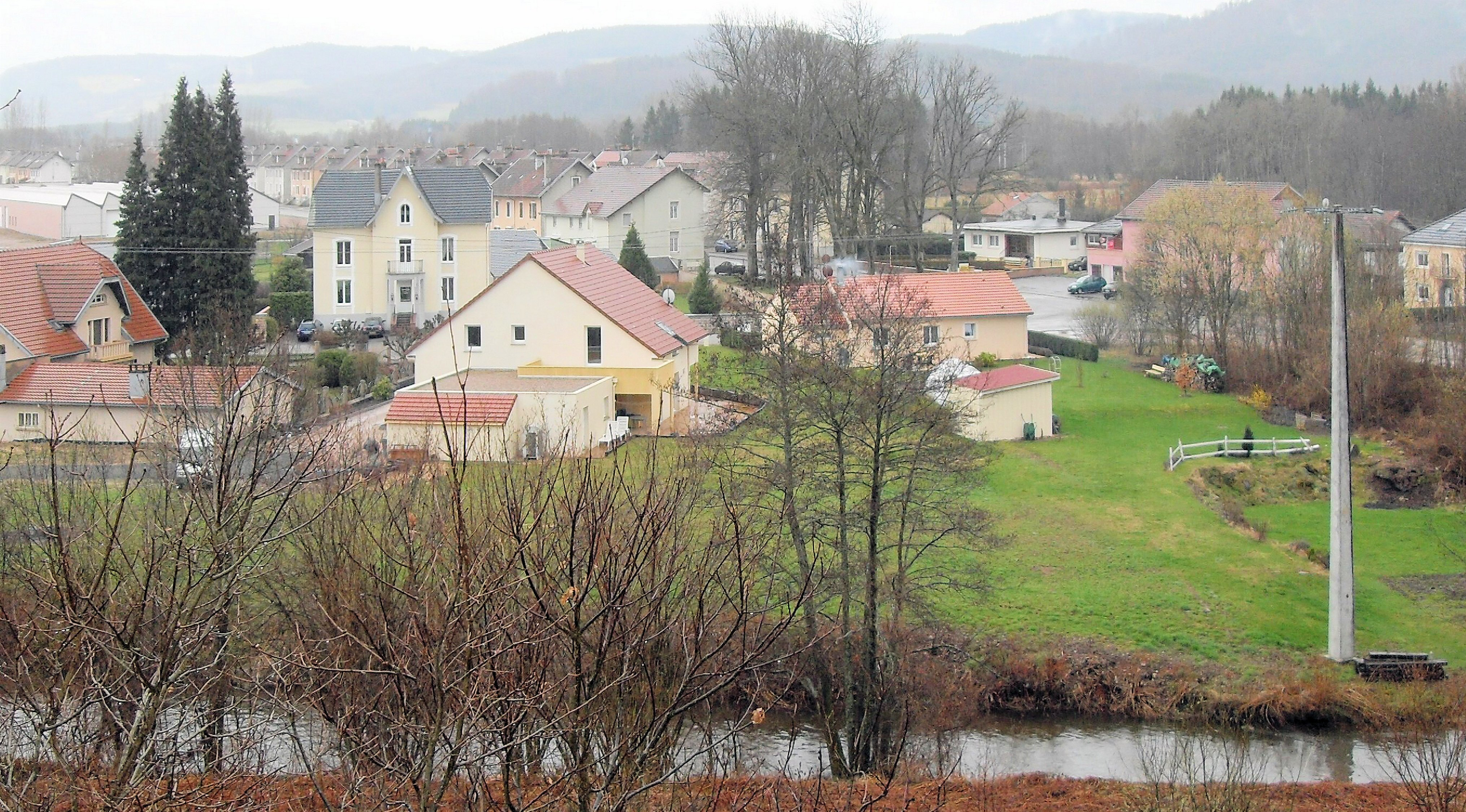
The Neuné at Laveline-devant-Bruyères

- List of rivers in France
