= Canton of Fraize =

Coordinates: 48°11′3″N 6°58′42″E

Fraize
- Former canton
- Interactive map of Fraize
- Country: France
- Region: Grand Est
- Department: Vosges
- No. of communes: {{{nbcomm}}}
- Disbanded: 2015
- Population (2012): 12,304

The Canton of Fraize is a French former administrative and electoral grouping of communes in the Vosges département of eastern France and in the region of Lorraine. It was disbanded following the French canton reorganisation which came into effect in March 2015. It had 12,304 inhabitants (2012).

Positioned within the Arrondissement of Saint-Dié-des-Vosges, the canton had its administrative centre at Fraize.

== Composition ==
The Canton of Fraize comprised the following 9 communes:

- Anould
- Ban-sur-Meurthe-Clefcy
- La Croix-aux-Mines
- Entre-deux-Eaux
- Fraize
- Mandray
- Plainfaing
- Saint-Léonard
- Le Valtin
