= Association of communes of the Upper Meurthe =

The Association of communes of the Upper Meurthe (French: Communauté de communes de la Haute Meurthe) is a former administrative association of communes in the Vosges département of eastern France and on the eastern side of the region of Lorraine. It was merged into the Communauté de communes de Saint-Dié-des-Vosges in January 2014, which was merged into the new Communauté d'agglomération de Saint-Dié-des-Vosges in January 2017. The name is a reference to the upper reaches of the river Meurthe. Created in 1996, the association had its administrative offices at Fraize.

The Communauté de communes comprised the following communes:

- Ban-sur-Meurthe-Clefcy
- Fraize
- Mandray (only since April 2006)
- Plainfaing
