= Aumontzey =

Commune in Vosges, France

- Part of Granges-Aumontzey
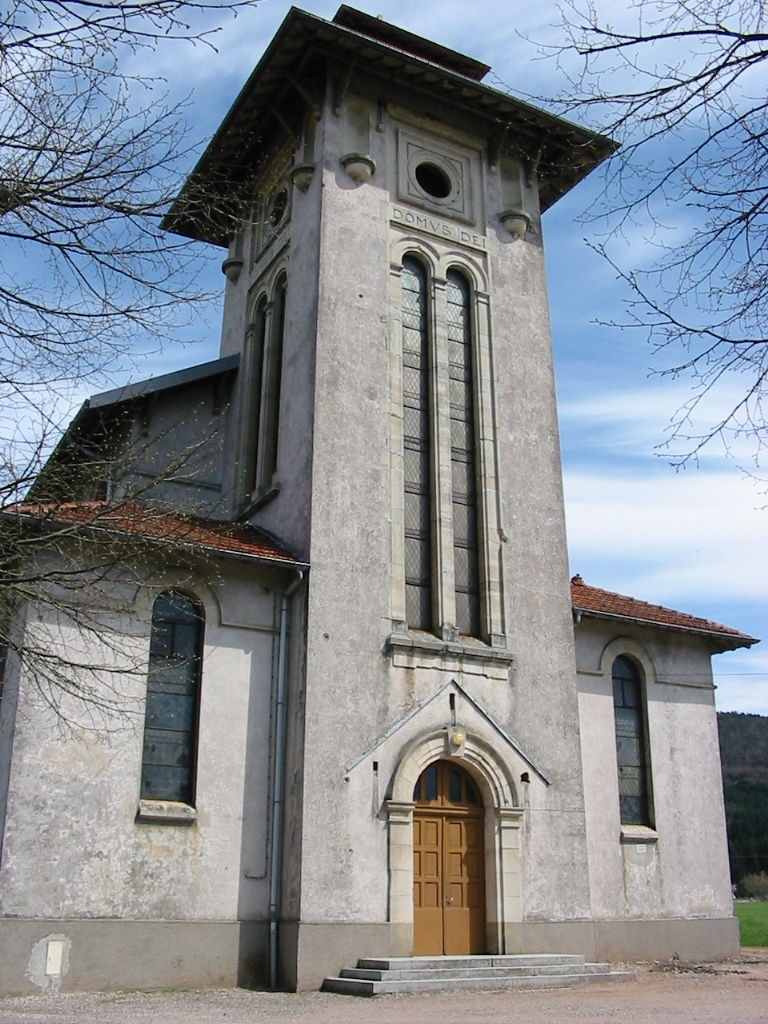
- Église Notre-Dame-du-Saint-Rosaire
- Location of Aumontzey
- Location within France Location within Grand Est
- Coordinates: 48°10′04″N 6°46′33″E
- Country: France
- Region: Grand Est
- Department: Vosges
- Arrondissement: Saint-Dié-des-Vosges
- Canton: Gérardmer
- Commune: Granges-Aumontzey
- Area^{1}: 3.37 km^{2} (1.30 sq mi)
- Elevation: 471 m (1,545 ft)
- Highest elevation: 732 m (2,402 ft)
- Lowest elevation: 454 m (1,490 ft)
- Population (2019): 477
  - Density: 142/km^{2} (367/sq mi)
- Time zone: UTC+01:00 (CET)
  - Summer (DST): UTC+02:00 (CEST)
- Postal code: 88640
- ^{1} French Land Register data, which excludes lakes, ponds, glaciers > 1 km^{2} (0.386 sq mi or 247 acres) and river estuaries.

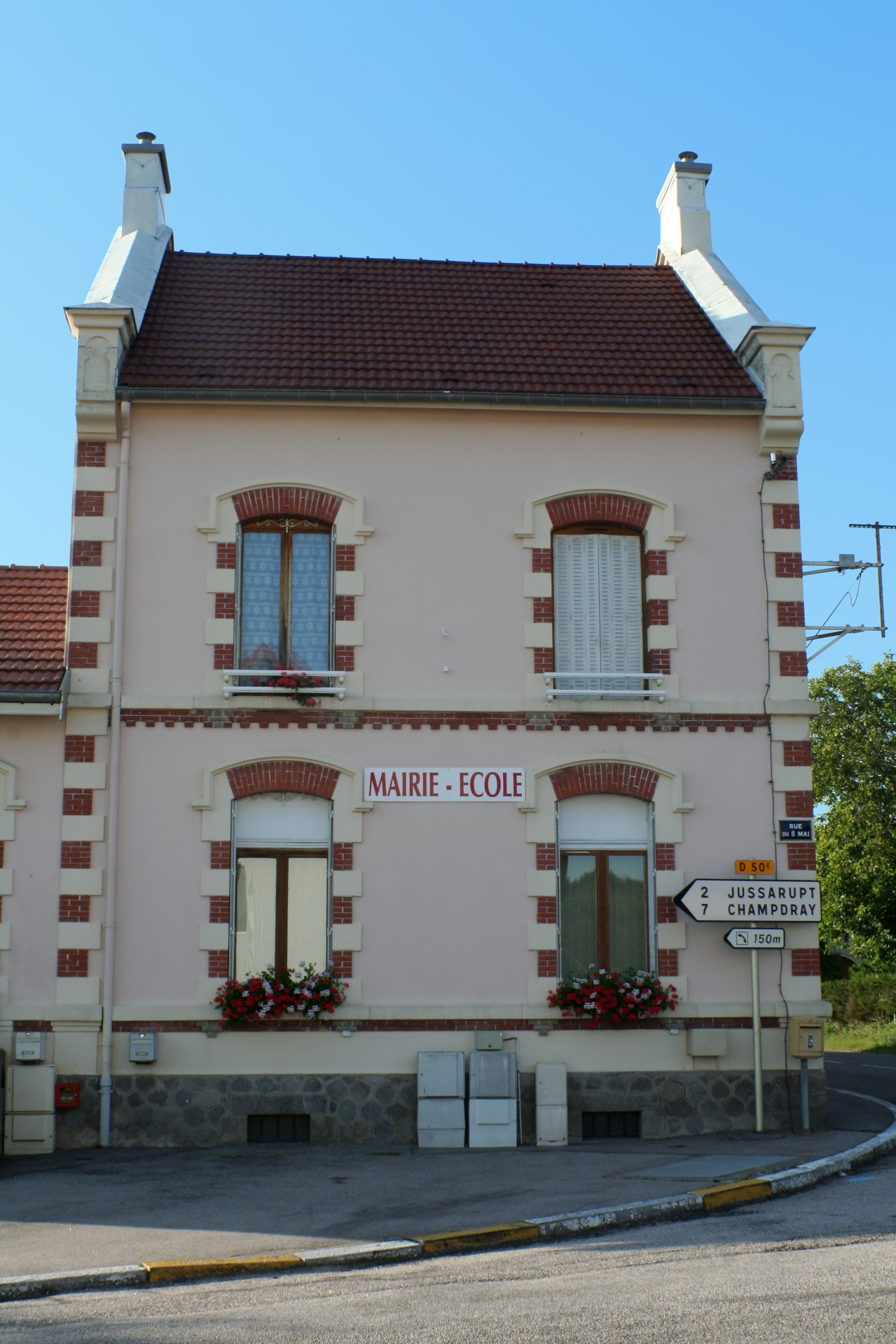
Town hall

Aumontzey (French pronunciation: [omɔ̃dzɛ]) is a former commune in the Vosges department in northeastern France. On 1 January 2016, it was merged into the new commune Granges-Aumontzey.

== See also ==
- Communes of the Vosges department
