= Fraizer =

Fraizer is both a given name and a surname. Notable people with the name include:

== Given name ==
- Fraizer Campbell (b. 1987), English footballer

== Surname ==
- Mark Fraizer (b. 1988), American politician
- Alexander Fraizer (c. 1610 – 1681), Scottish physician
- Matthew Fraizer (b. 1998), American baseball player
- Nelson Fraizer (1971–2014), American professional wrestler
- Stanley C. Fraizer (1937–1992), American professional wrestler

== See also ==
- Fraize (disambiguation)
- Frazer (name)
