= Fraize (disambiguation) =

Fraize is a French commune.

Fraize or Fraise may also refer to:

== People ==
- Gene Fraise (1932–2020), American politician
- Olivier Fraise (born 1970), French luger
- Peter Fraize, American saxophonist and George Washington University professor
- Franko Fraize, stage name of British rapper Frankie Dean

== Other uses ==
- Canton of Fraize, a former French group of communes
- Fraise (1988–2005), an American Thoroughbred racehorse
- Fraise, a fork of the Mac OS X text editor Smultron
