= Granges-sur-Vologne =

- Part of Granges-Aumontzey
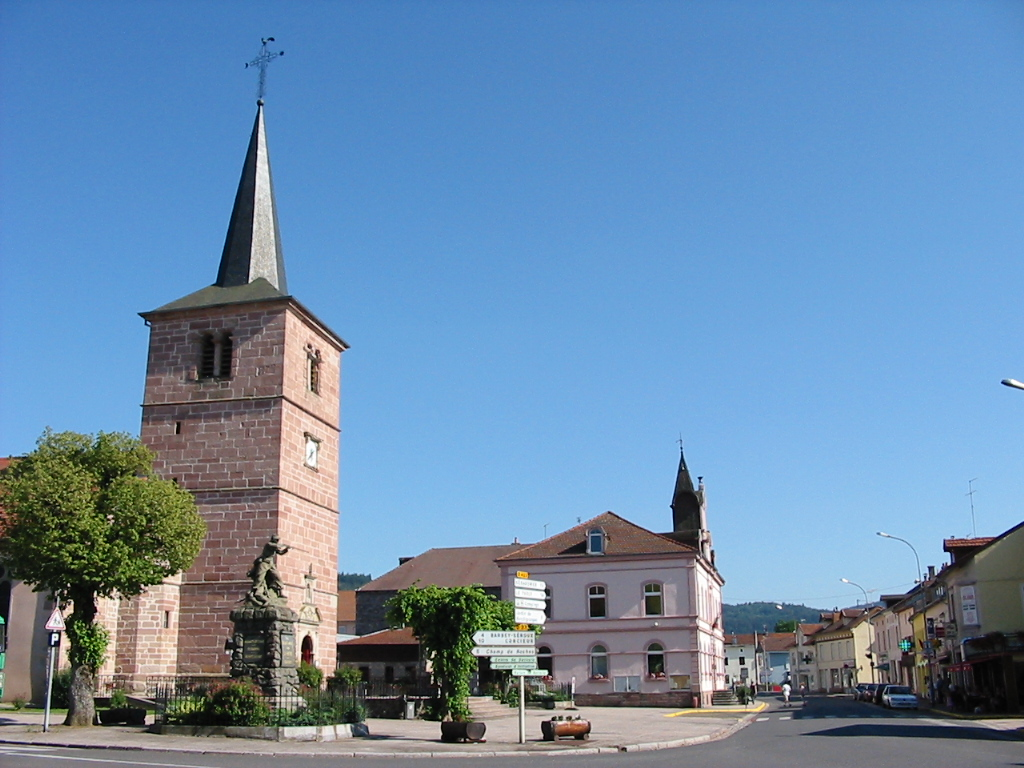

- Coat of arms
- Location of Granges-sur-Vologne
- Location within France Location within Grand Est
- Coordinates: 48°08′47″N 6°47′22″E
- Country: France
- Region: Grand Est
- Department: Vosges
- Arrondissement: Saint-Dié-des-Vosges
- Canton: Gérardmer
- Commune: Granges-Aumontzey
- Area^{1}: 29.64 km^{2} (11.44 sq mi)
- Elevation: 499 m (1,637 ft)
- Highest elevation: 922 m (3,025 ft)
- Lowest elevation: 473 m (1,552 ft)
- Population (2019): 2,136
  - Density: 72.06/km^{2} (186.6/sq mi)
- Demonym: Gringeaud(e)s
- Time zone: UTC+01:00 (CET)
  - Summer (DST): UTC+02:00 (CEST)
- Postal code: 88640
- Website: granges-aumontzey.fr
- ^{1} French Land Register data, which excludes lakes, ponds, glaciers > 1 km^{2} (0.386 sq mi or 247 acres) and river estuaries.

Granges-sur-Vologne (French pronunciation: [ɡʁɑ̃ʒ syʁ vɔlɔɲ], literally Granges on Vologne) is a former commune in the Vosges department in northeastern France. On 1 January 2016, it was merged into the new commune Granges-Aumontzey.

== See also ==
- Communes of the Vosges department
