= Granges-Aumontzey =

- Commune
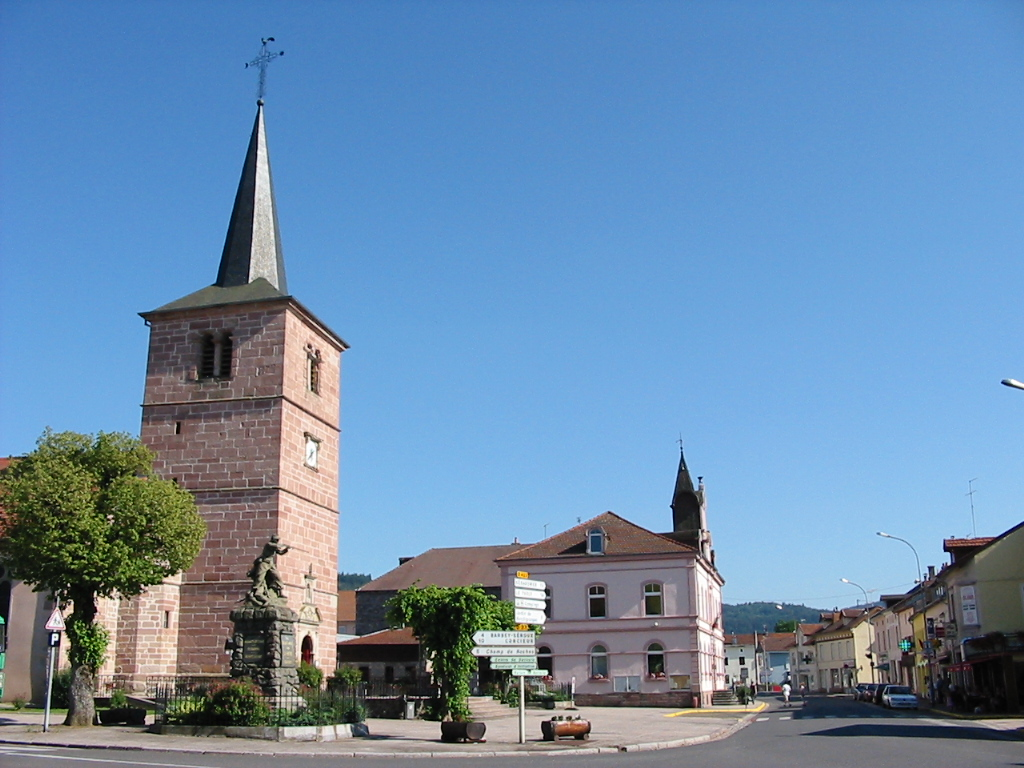
- The church in Granges-sur-Vologne

- Coat of arms
- Location of Granges-Aumontzey
- Location within France Location within Grand Est
- Coordinates: 48°08′42″N 6°47′20″E
- Country: France
- Region: Grand Est
- Department: Vosges
- Arrondissement: Saint-Dié-des-Vosges
- Canton: Gérardmer
- Intercommunality: CC Gérardmer Hautes Vosges

Government
  - Mayor (2020–2026): Frédéric Thomas
- Area^{1}: 33.01 km^{2} (12.75 sq mi)
- Population (2023): 2,529
  - Density: 76.61/km^{2} (198.4/sq mi)
- Time zone: UTC+01:00 (CET)
  - Summer (DST): UTC+02:00 (CEST)
- INSEE/Postal code: 88218 /88640
- ^{1} French Land Register data, which excludes lakes, ponds, glaciers > 1 km^{2} (0.386 sq mi or 247 acres) and river estuaries.

Granges-Aumontzey (French pronunciation: [ɡʁɑ̃ʒ omɔ̃dzɛ]) is a commune in the Vosges department of northeastern France. The municipality was established on 1 January 2016 and consists of the former communes of Aumontzey and Granges-sur-Vologne.

== Population ==
Population data refer to the area corresponding with the commune as of January 2025.

Historical population
Year	Pop.	±% p.a.
1968	3,212	—
1975	3,299	+0.38%
1982	3,208	−0.40%
1990	2,921	−1.16%
1999	2,891	−0.11%
2007	2,785	−0.47%
2012	2,757	−0.20%
2017	2,665	−0.68%
2023	2,529	−0.87%
Source: INSEE

== See also ==
- Communes of the Vosges department
