= Barbey-Seroux =

- Commune
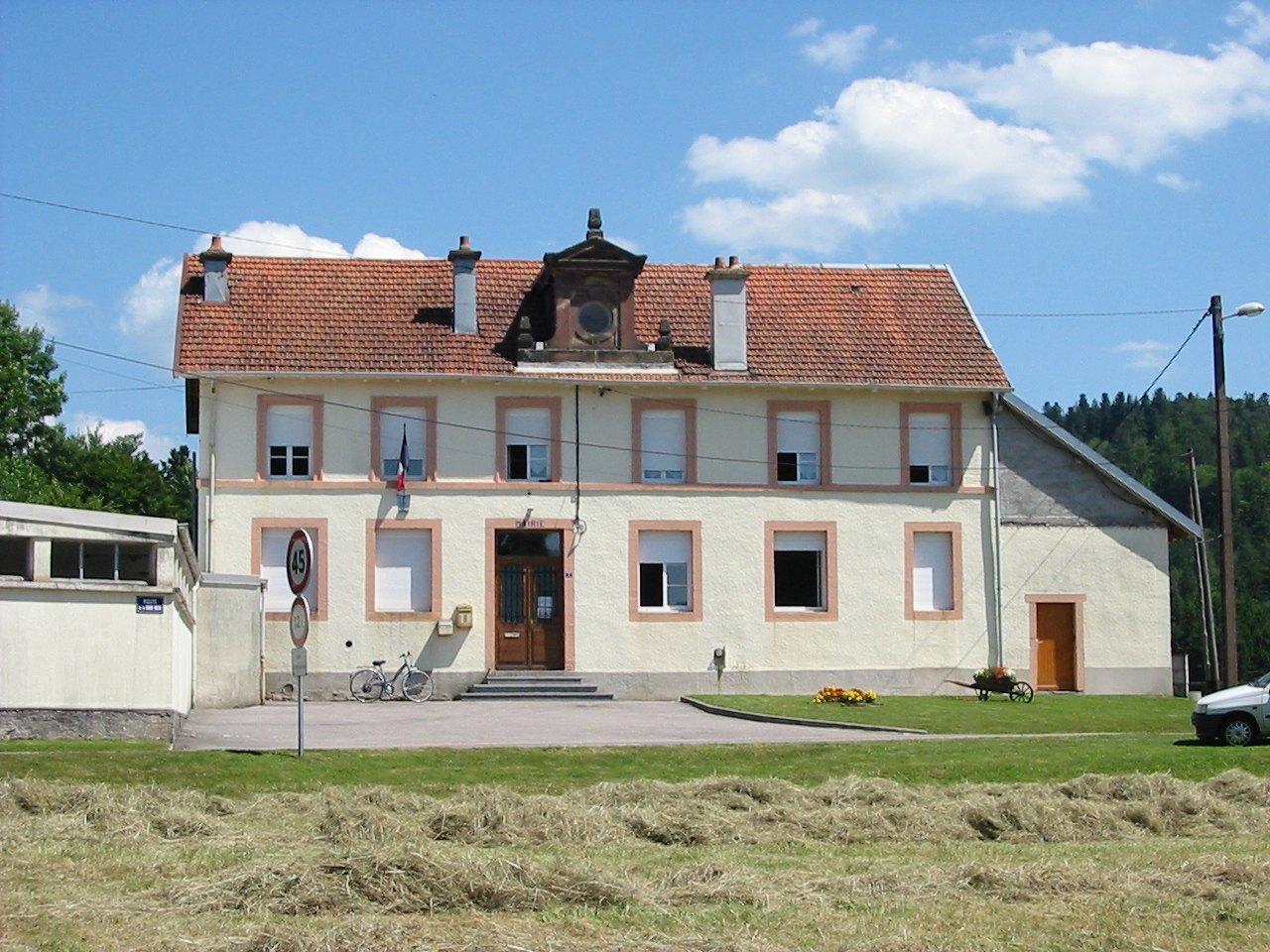
- The town hall in Barbey-Seroux
- Location of Barbey-Seroux
- Location within France Location within Grand Est
- Coordinates: 48°08′33″N 6°50′24″E
- Country: France
- Region: Grand Est
- Department: Vosges
- Arrondissement: Saint-Dié-des-Vosges
- Canton: Gérardmer
- Intercommunality: CA Saint-Dié-des-Vosges

Government
  - Mayor (2024–2026): Sophie Villaume
- Area^{1}: 7.32 km^{2} (2.83 sq mi)
- Elevation: 600 m (2,000 ft)
- Highest elevation: 870 m (2,850 ft)
- Lowest elevation: 545 m (1,788 ft)
- Population (2023): 143
  - Density: 19.5/km^{2} (50.6/sq mi)
- Time zone: UTC+01:00 (CET)
  - Summer (DST): UTC+02:00 (CEST)
- INSEE/Postal code: 88035 /88640
- ^{1} French Land Register data, which excludes lakes, ponds, glaciers > 1 km^{2} (0.386 sq mi or 247 acres) and river estuaries.

Barbey-Seroux (French pronunciation: [baʁbɛ səʁu]) is a commune in the Vosges department in Grand Est in northeastern France.

== See also ==
- Communes of the Vosges department
