= Les Poulières =

- Commune
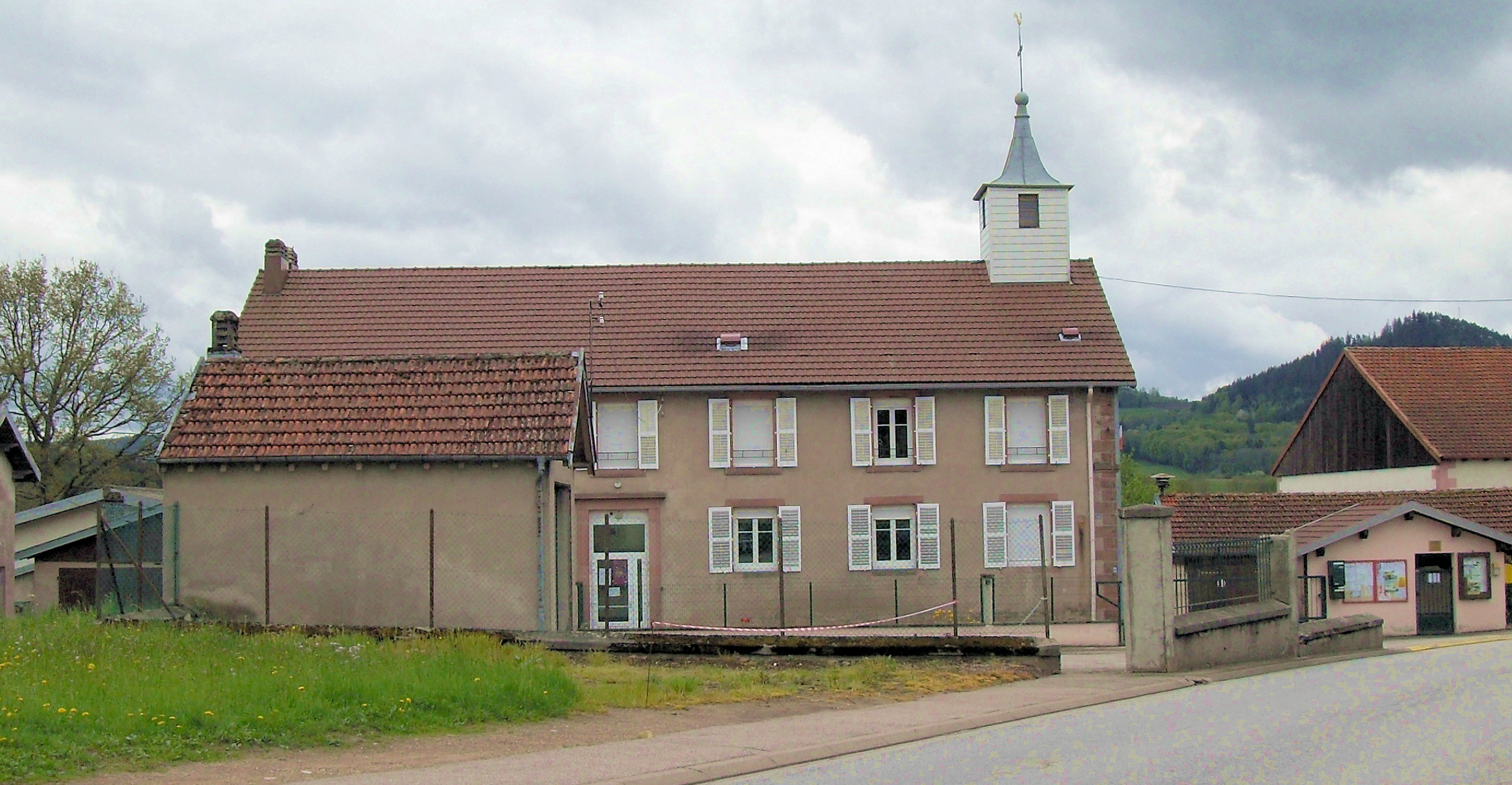
- The town hall in Les Poulières
- Location of Les Poulières
- Location within France Location within Grand Est
- Coordinates: 48°11′54″N 6°47′30″E
- Country: France
- Region: Grand Est
- Department: Vosges
- Arrondissement: Saint-Dié-des-Vosges
- Canton: Bruyères
- Intercommunality: CA Saint-Dié-des-Vosges

Government
  - Mayor (2020–2026): Jean-Luc Thiriet
- Area^{1}: 2.98 km^{2} (1.15 sq mi)
- Elevation: 456 m (1,496 ft)
- Highest elevation: 663 m (2,175 ft)
- Lowest elevation: 451 m (1,480 ft)
- Population (2023): 307
  - Density: 103/km^{2} (267/sq mi)
- Time zone: UTC+01:00 (CET)
  - Summer (DST): UTC+02:00 (CEST)
- INSEE/Postal code: 88356 /88660
- ^{1} French Land Register data, which excludes lakes, ponds, glaciers > 1 km^{2} (0.386 sq mi or 247 acres) and river estuaries.

Les Poulières (French pronunciation: [le puljɛʁ]) is a commune in the Vosges department in Grand Est in northeastern France.

Inhabitants are called Polérois.

== Geography ==
The commune is positioned between Épinal to the west and Saint-Dié to the north-east, in the valley of the Neuné, a tributary of the Vologne River. Neighbouring communes are Biffontaine and La Chapelle-devant-Bruyères. Les Poulières is at the confluence of several roads, but roads here are small and twisting, thanks to the topography, on the western fringes of the Vosges Mountains.

== See also ==
- Communes of the Vosges department
