= Arrentès-de-Corcieux =

- Commune
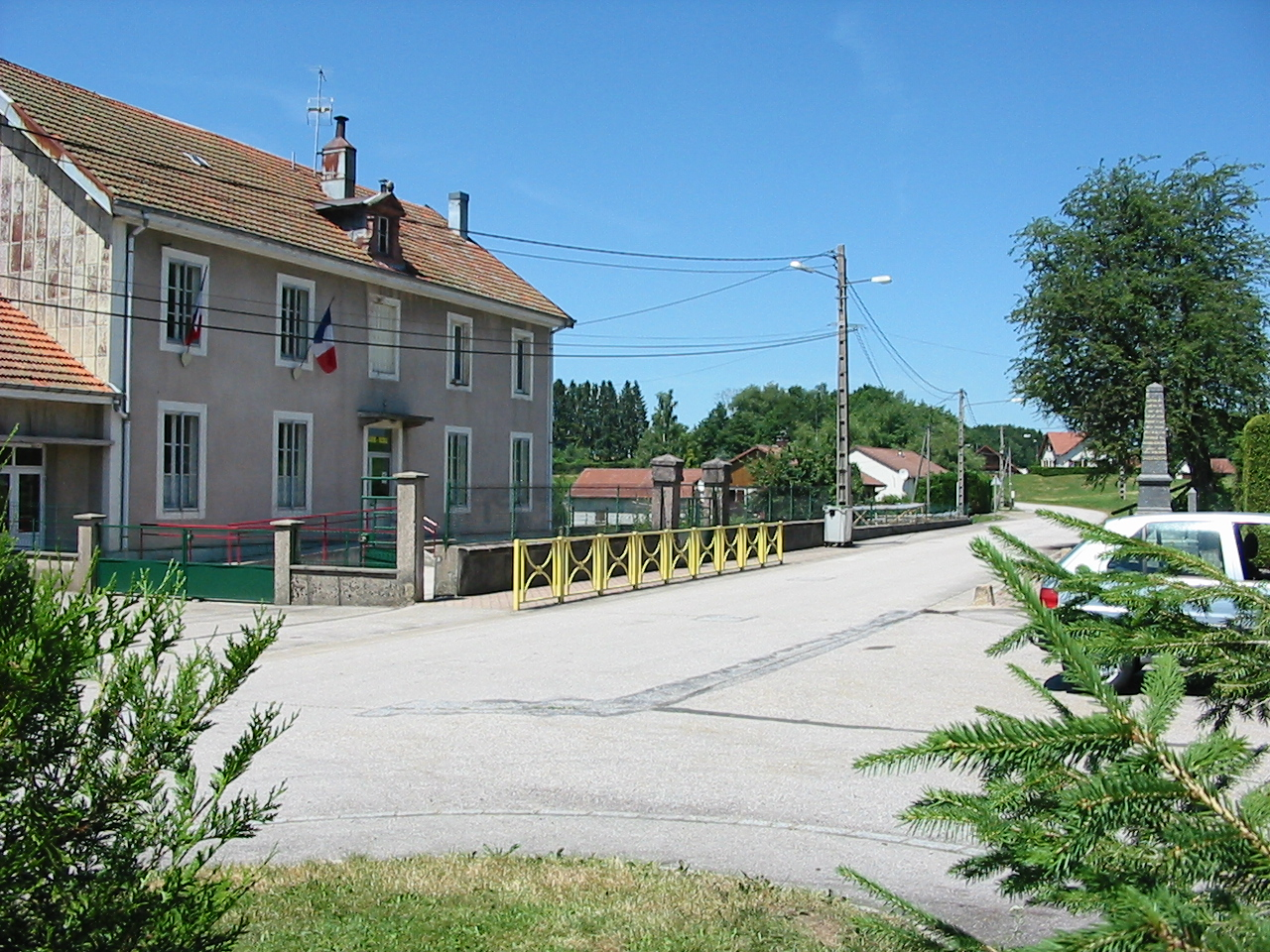
- The town hall in Arrentès-de-Corcieux

- Coat of arms
- Location of Arrentès-de-Corcieux
- Location within France Location within Grand Est
- Coordinates: 48°08′42″N 6°51′54″E
- Country: France
- Region: Grand Est
- Department: Vosges
- Arrondissement: Saint-Dié-des-Vosges
- Canton: Gérardmer
- Intercommunality: CA Saint-Dié-des-Vosges

Government
  - Mayor (2020–2026): Virginie Lalevée
- Area^{1}: 17 km^{2} (6.6 sq mi)
- Elevation: 720 m (2,360 ft)
- Highest elevation: 960 m (3,150 ft)
- Lowest elevation: 580 m (1,900 ft)
- Population (2023): 169
  - Density: 9.9/km^{2} (26/sq mi)
- Time zone: UTC+01:00 (CET)
  - Summer (DST): UTC+02:00 (CEST)
- INSEE/Postal code: 88014 /88430
- ^{1} French Land Register data, which excludes lakes, ponds, glaciers > 1 km^{2} (0.386 sq mi or 247 acres) and river estuaries.

Arrentès-de-Corcieux (French pronunciation: [aʁɑ̃tɛs də kɔʁsjø], literally Arrentès of Corcieux) is a commune in the Vosges department in Grand Est in northeastern France.

== See also ==
- Communes of the Vosges department
