= Fraize =

- Commune
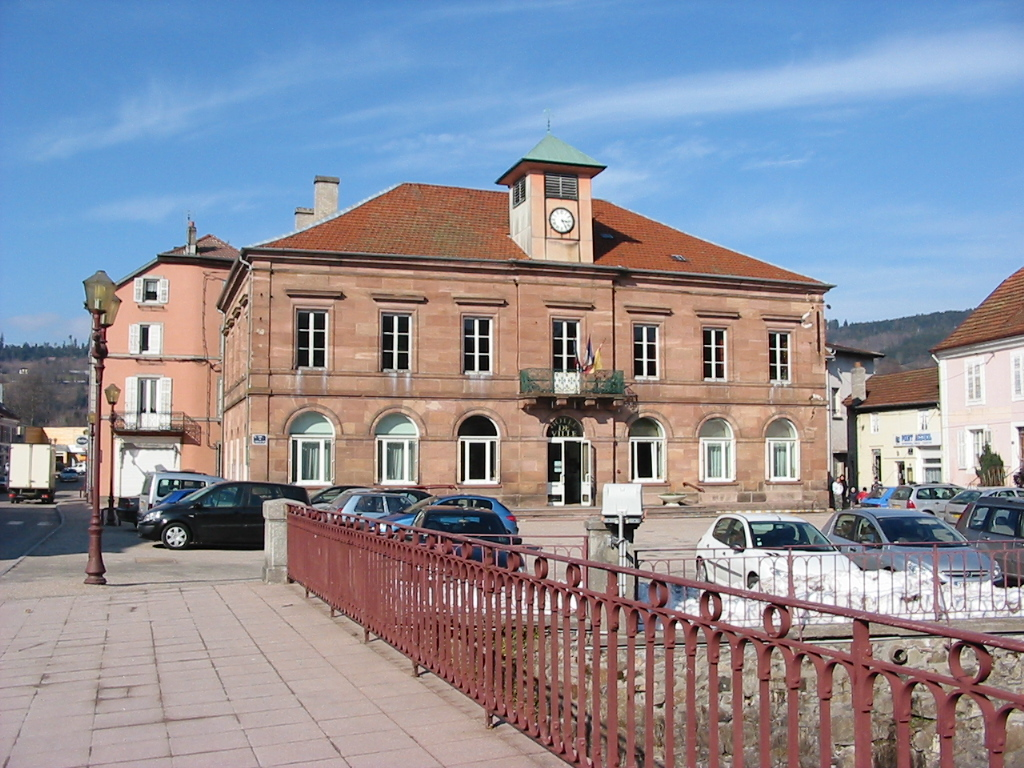
- Town hall

- Flag Coat of arms
- Location of Fraize
- Location within France Location within Grand Est
- Coordinates: 48°11′11″N 7°00′08″E
- Country: France
- Region: Grand Est
- Department: Vosges
- Arrondissement: Saint-Dié-des-Vosges
- Canton: Gérardmer
- Intercommunality: CA Saint-Dié-des-Vosges

Government
  - Mayor (2020–2026): Caroline Lerognon
- Area^{1}: 15.59 km^{2} (6.02 sq mi)
- Elevation: 507 m (1,663 ft)
- Highest elevation: 1,131 m (3,711 ft)
- Lowest elevation: 468 m (1,535 ft)
- Population (2023): 2,843
  - Density: 182.4/km^{2} (472.3/sq mi)
- Time zone: UTC+01:00 (CET)
  - Summer (DST): UTC+02:00 (CEST)
- INSEE/Postal code: 88181 /88230
- ^{1} French Land Register data, which excludes lakes, ponds, glaciers > 1 km^{2} (0.386 sq mi or 247 acres) and river estuaries.

Fraize (French pronunciation: [fʁɛz]) is a commune in the Vosges department in Grand Est in northeastern France about 25 miles from Colmar.

== Geography ==
Fraize is a municipality in the Vosges Mountains located in the Ballons des Vosges Nature Park, to the east of the department, between Saint-Dié-des-Vosges (11.8 km (7.3 mi)), Gérardmer (15.3 km (9.5 mi)), and Colmar (28.9 km (18.0 mi)). The neighboring municipalities are Plainfaing, Ban-sur-Meurthe-Clefcy, Anould, Saint-Léonard, Mandray, and La Croix-aux-Mines in the Vosges, and Le Bonhomme in the Haut-Rhin.

== Population ==
Historical population
Year	Pop.	±% p.a.
1968	3,486	—
1975	3,367	−0.49%
1982	3,357	−0.04%
1990	3,049	−1.20%
1999	2,990	−0.22%
2007	3,058	+0.28%
2012	3,069	+0.07%
2017	2,871	−1.32%
2023	2,843	−0.16%
Source: INSEE

== Twin communes ==
Since 1998 Fierzë, Albania is a twin commune of Fraize.

== See also ==
- Communes of the Vosges department
