= Vienville =

- Commune
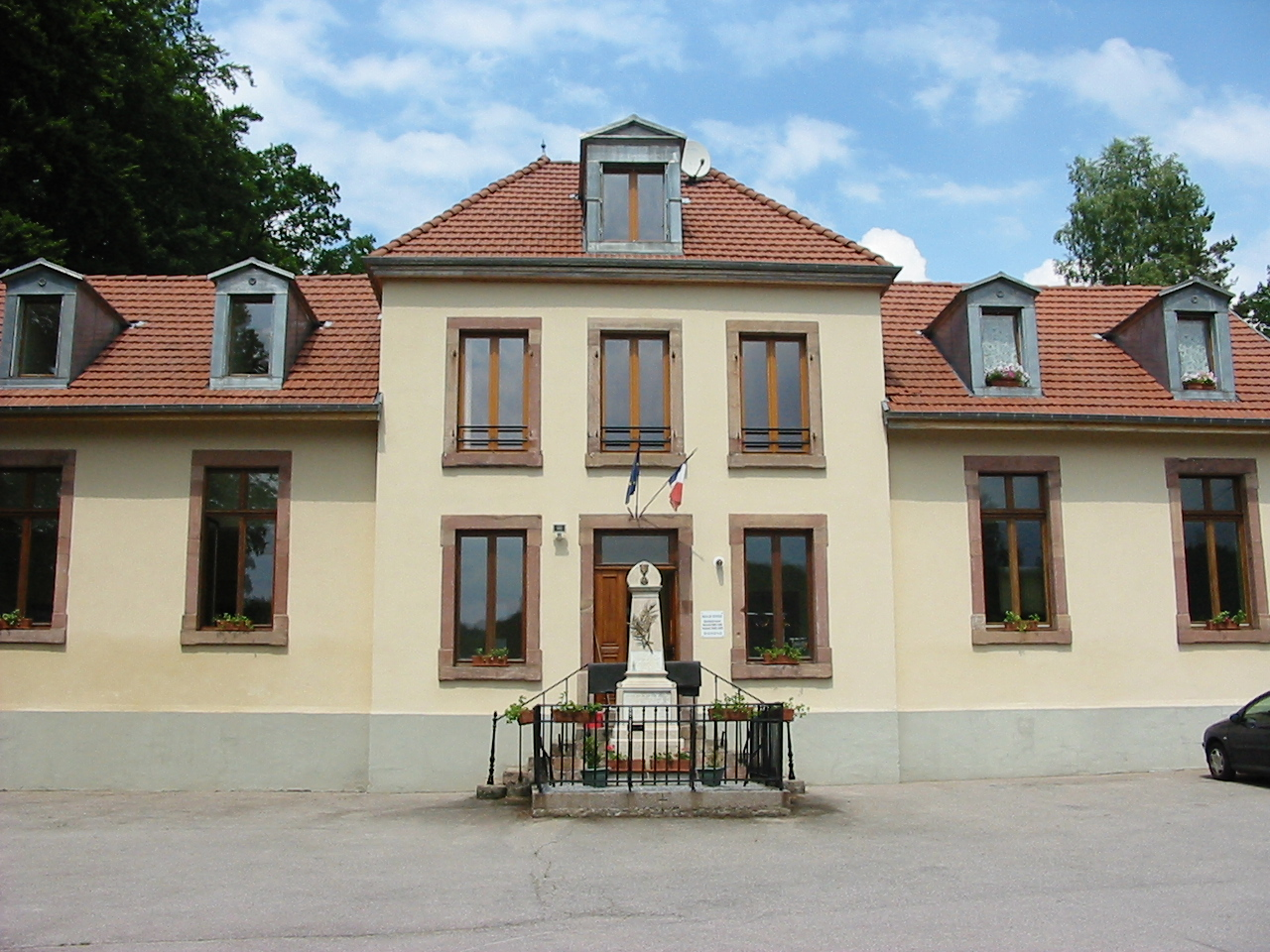
- The town hall in Vienville
- Location of Vienville
- Location within France Location within Grand Est
- Coordinates: 48°10′30″N 6°49′52″E
- Country: France
- Region: Grand Est
- Department: Vosges
- Arrondissement: Saint-Dié-des-Vosges
- Canton: Gérardmer
- Intercommunality: CA Saint-Dié-des-Vosges

Government
  - Mayor (2020–2026): Catherine Lecomte
- Area^{1}: 3.38 km^{2} (1.31 sq mi)
- Elevation: 560 m (1,840 ft)
- Highest elevation: 740 m (2,430 ft)
- Lowest elevation: 503 m (1,650 ft)
- Population (2023): 117
  - Density: 34.6/km^{2} (89.7/sq mi)
- Time zone: UTC+01:00 (CET)
  - Summer (DST): UTC+02:00 (CEST)
- INSEE/Postal code: 88505 /88430
- ^{1} French Land Register data, which excludes lakes, ponds, glaciers > 1 km^{2} (0.386 sq mi or 247 acres) and river estuaries.

Vienville (French pronunciation: [vjɛ̃vil]) is a commune in the Vosges department in Grand Est in northeastern France.

== See also ==
- Communes of the Vosges department
