= Gerbépal =

- Commune
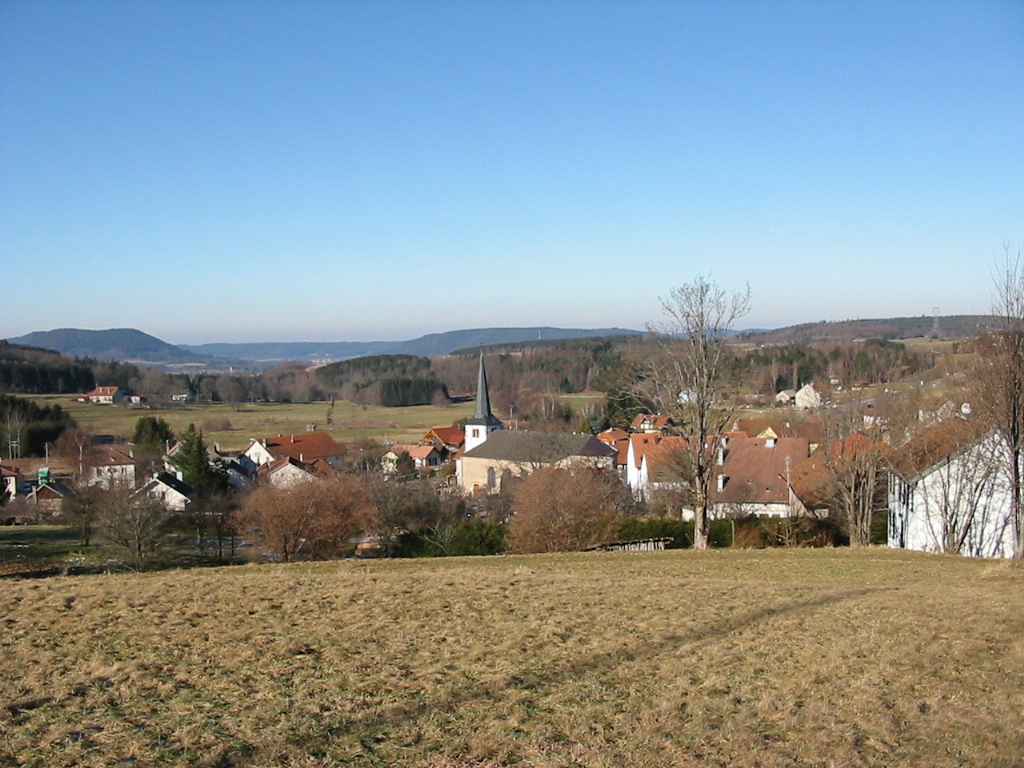
- A general view of Gerbépal

- Coat of arms
- Location of Gerbépal
- Location within France Location within Grand Est
- Coordinates: 48°09′03″N 6°55′22″E
- Country: France
- Region: Grand Est
- Department: Vosges
- Arrondissement: Saint-Dié-des-Vosges
- Canton: Gérardmer
- Intercommunality: CA Saint-Dié-des-Vosges

Government
  - Mayor (2020–2026): Bernard Thomas
- Area^{1}: 19.18 km^{2} (7.41 sq mi)
- Elevation: 630 m (2,070 ft)
- Highest elevation: 1,083 m (3,553 ft)
- Lowest elevation: 583 m (1,913 ft)
- Population (2023): 544
  - Density: 28.4/km^{2} (73.5/sq mi)
- Time zone: UTC+01:00 (CET)
  - Summer (DST): UTC+02:00 (CEST)
- INSEE/Postal code: 88198 /88430
- ^{1} French Land Register data, which excludes lakes, ponds, glaciers > 1 km^{2} (0.386 sq mi or 247 acres) and river estuaries.

Gerbépal (French pronunciation: [ʒɛʁbepal]) is a commune in the Vosges department in Grand Est in northeastern France.

== See also ==
- Communes of the Vosges department
