= Canton of Gérardmer =

Coordinates: 48.07°N 6.87°E

The canton of Gérardmer is an administrative division of the Vosges department, in northeastern France. At the French canton reorganisation which came into effect in March 2015, it was expanded from 3 to 17 communes (2 of which merged into the new commune Granges-Aumontzey). Its seat is in Gérardmer.

It consists of the following communes:

1. Anould
2. Arrentès-de-Corcieux
3. Ban-sur-Meurthe-Clefcy
4. Barbey-Seroux
5. La Chapelle-devant-Bruyères
6. Corcieux
7. Fraize
8. Gérardmer
9. Gerbépal
10. Granges-Aumontzey
11. La Houssière
12. Liézey
13. Plainfaing
14. Le Valtin
15. Vienville
16. Xonrupt-Longemer
