= La Houssière =

- Commune
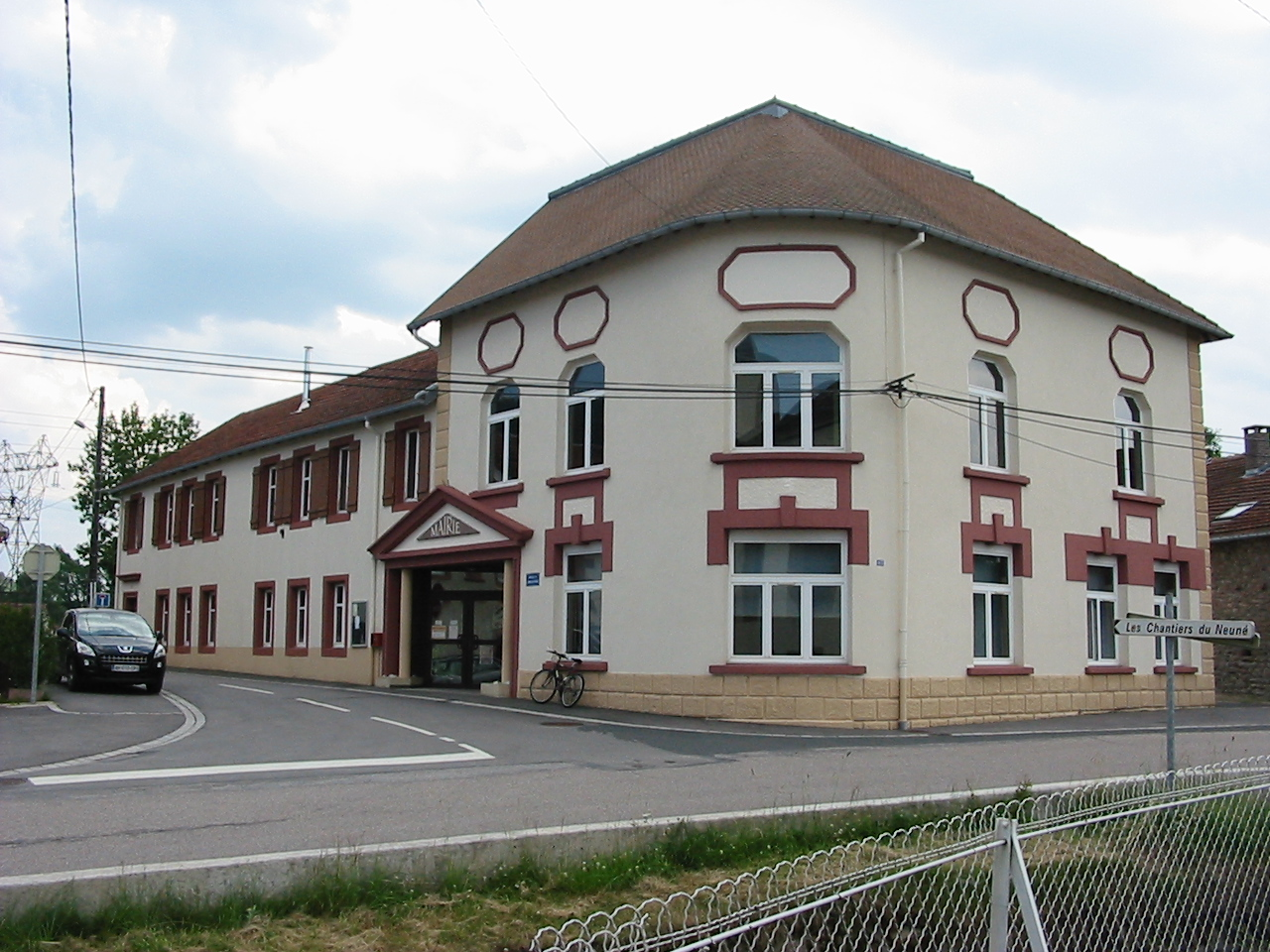
- The town hall in La Houssière

- Coat of arms
- Location of La Houssière
- Location within France Location within Grand Est
- Coordinates: 48°11′46″N 6°51′15″E
- Country: France
- Region: Grand Est
- Department: Vosges
- Arrondissement: Saint-Dié-des-Vosges
- Canton: Gérardmer
- Intercommunality: CA Saint-Dié-des-Vosges

Government
  - Mayor (2020–2026): Jean Paul Boulanger
- Area^{1}: 19.54 km^{2} (7.54 sq mi)
- Elevation: 490 m (1,610 ft)
- Highest elevation: 750 m (2,460 ft)
- Lowest elevation: 436 m (1,430 ft)
- Population (2023): 507
  - Density: 25.9/km^{2} (67.2/sq mi)
- Time zone: UTC+01:00 (CET)
  - Summer (DST): UTC+02:00 (CEST)
- INSEE/Postal code: 88244 /88430
- ^{1} French Land Register data, which excludes lakes, ponds, glaciers > 1 km^{2} (0.386 sq mi or 247 acres) and river estuaries.

La Houssière (French pronunciation: [la usjɛʁ]) is a commune in the Vosges department in Grand Est in northeastern France.

== Geography ==
The river Mortagne forms part of the commune's northern border.

== See also ==
- Communes of the Vosges department
