= Mandray =

- Commune
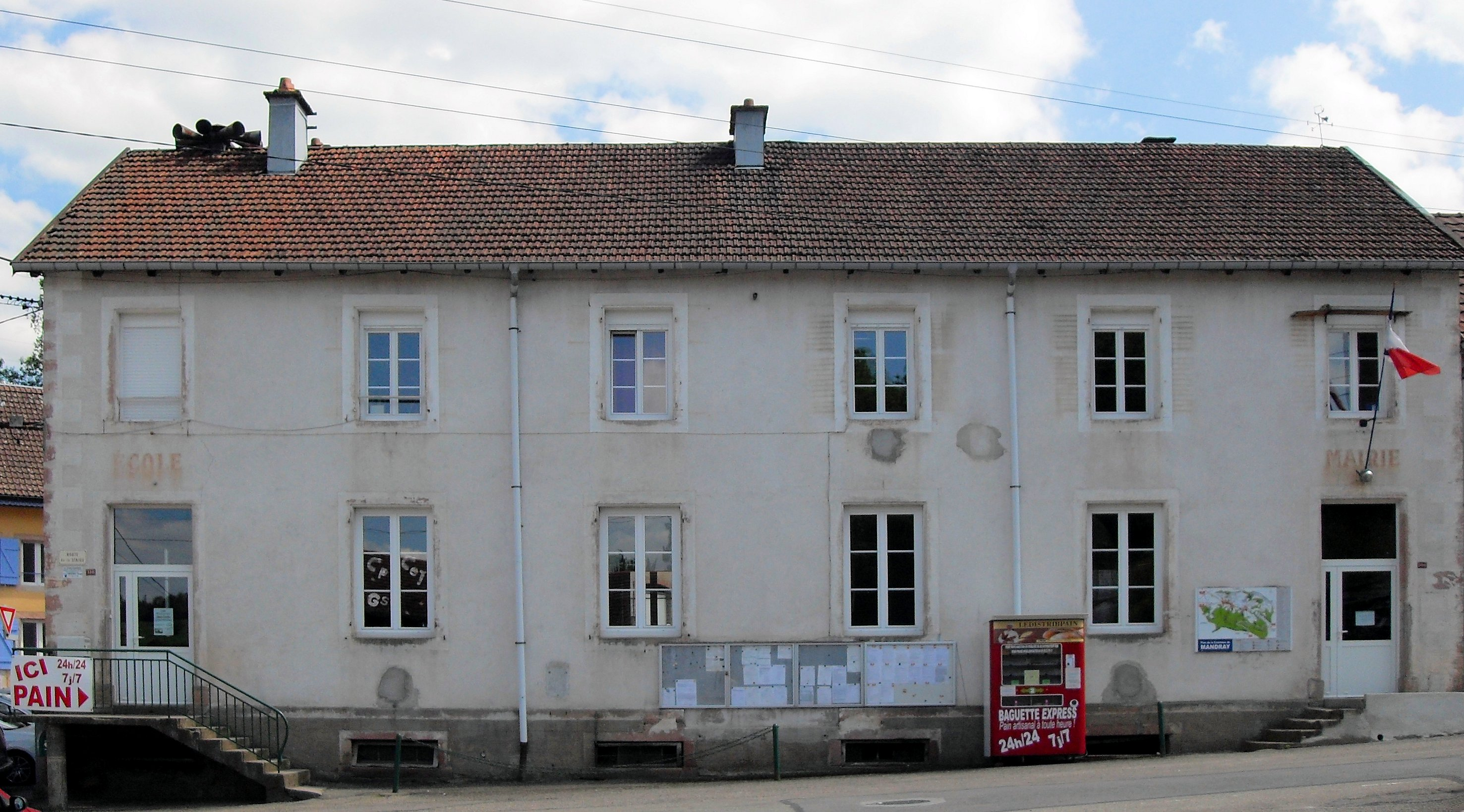
- The town hall and school in Mandray
- Location of Mandray
- Location within France Location within Grand Est
- Coordinates: 48°13′08″N 6°59′47″E
- Country: France
- Region: Grand Est
- Department: Vosges
- Arrondissement: Saint-Dié-des-Vosges
- Canton: Saint-Dié-des-Vosges-2
- Intercommunality: CA Saint-Dié-des-Vosges

Government
  - Mayor (2020–2026): Emmanuel Laurent
- Area^{1}: 12.36 km^{2} (4.77 sq mi)
- Elevation: 470 m (1,540 ft)
- Highest elevation: 770 m (2,530 ft)
- Lowest elevation: 398 m (1,306 ft)
- Population (2023): 586
  - Density: 47.4/km^{2} (123/sq mi)
- Demonym(s): Mandresayen (m); Mandresayenne (f)
- Time zone: UTC+01:00 (CET)
  - Summer (DST): UTC+02:00 (CEST)
- INSEE/Postal code: 88284 /88650
- ^{1} French Land Register data, which excludes lakes, ponds, glaciers > 1 km^{2} (0.386 sq mi or 247 acres) and river estuaries.

Mandray (French pronunciation: [mɑ̃dʁɛ]) is a commune in the Vosges department in Grand Est in northeastern France.

Inhabitants are called Mandresayens or Mandresayennes in French according to gender.

== Geography ==
Mandray is located some ten kilometres (six miles) southeast of Saint-Dié on the eastern side of the department, and at the western edge of the Vosges Mountains. It nestles in the valley of the Mandresay, a small tributary of the Meurthe which itself rises nearby. The commune is within the Ballons des Vosges Regional Natural Park.

The commune comprises not one single village but rather a grouping of dispersed hamlets at varying altitudes, these being Haute-Mandray, Mi-Mandray, Basse-Mandray, Bénifosse, la Béhouille, la Nold, le Pré du Moulin, Mardichamp, le Raichant (meaning garden in the local patois), les Angles and les Carrières

Using the Mandray Pass, it is possible to drive to Fraize and to La Croix-aux-Mines. Despite a sign indicating an altitude of 707 meters, the actual altitude of the pass is now calculated as 694 meters.

== History ==
Mandray was the scene of fighting early in the First World War. In retaliation, the Germans torched the church on 28 August 1914 and shot some civilians.

== See also ==
- Communes of the Vosges department
