= Anould =

- Commune
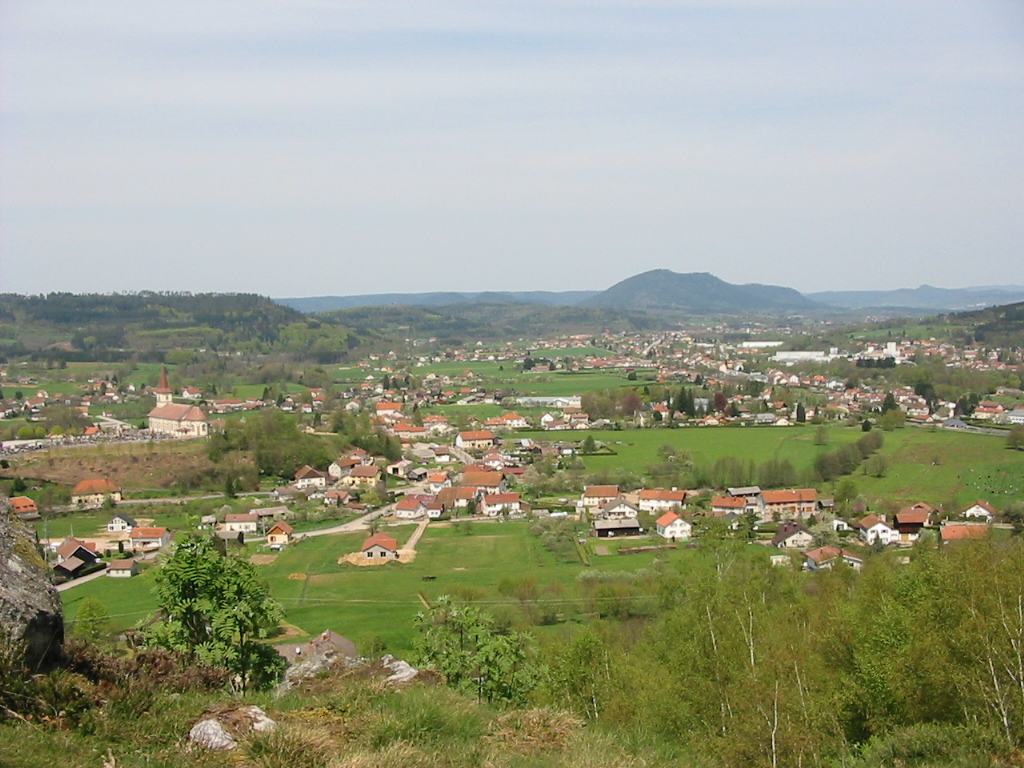
- Panorama de la Roche du Sphinx

- Coat of arms
- Location of Anould
- Location within France Location within Grand Est
- Coordinates: 48°11′11″N 6°56′47″E
- Country: France
- Region: Grand Est
- Department: Vosges
- Arrondissement: Saint-Dié-des-Vosges
- Canton: Gérardmer
- Intercommunality: CA Saint-Dié-des-Vosges

Government
  - Mayor (2020–2026): Jacques Hestin
- Area^{1}: 24.23 km^{2} (9.36 sq mi)
- Elevation: 455 m (1,493 ft)
- Highest elevation: 933 m (3,061 ft)
- Lowest elevation: 419 m (1,375 ft)
- Population (2023): 3,234
  - Density: 133.5/km^{2} (345.7/sq mi)
- Time zone: UTC+01:00 (CET)
  - Summer (DST): UTC+02:00 (CEST)
- INSEE/Postal code: 88009 /88650
- ^{1} French Land Register data, which excludes lakes, ponds, glaciers > 1 km^{2} (0.386 sq mi or 247 acres) and river estuaries.

Anould (French pronunciation: [anuld]; German: Alhausen) is a commune in the Vosges department in Grand Est in northeastern France.

== Population ==
Historical population
Year	Pop.	±% p.a.
1968	2,642	—
1975	2,700	+0.31%
1982	2,885	+0.95%
1990	2,960	+0.32%
1999	2,992	+0.12%
2007	3,261	+1.08%
2012	3,371	+0.67%
2017	3,369	−0.01%
2023	3,234	−0.68%
Source: INSEE

== See also ==
- Communes of the Vosges department
