= La Chapelle-devant-Bruyères =

- Commune
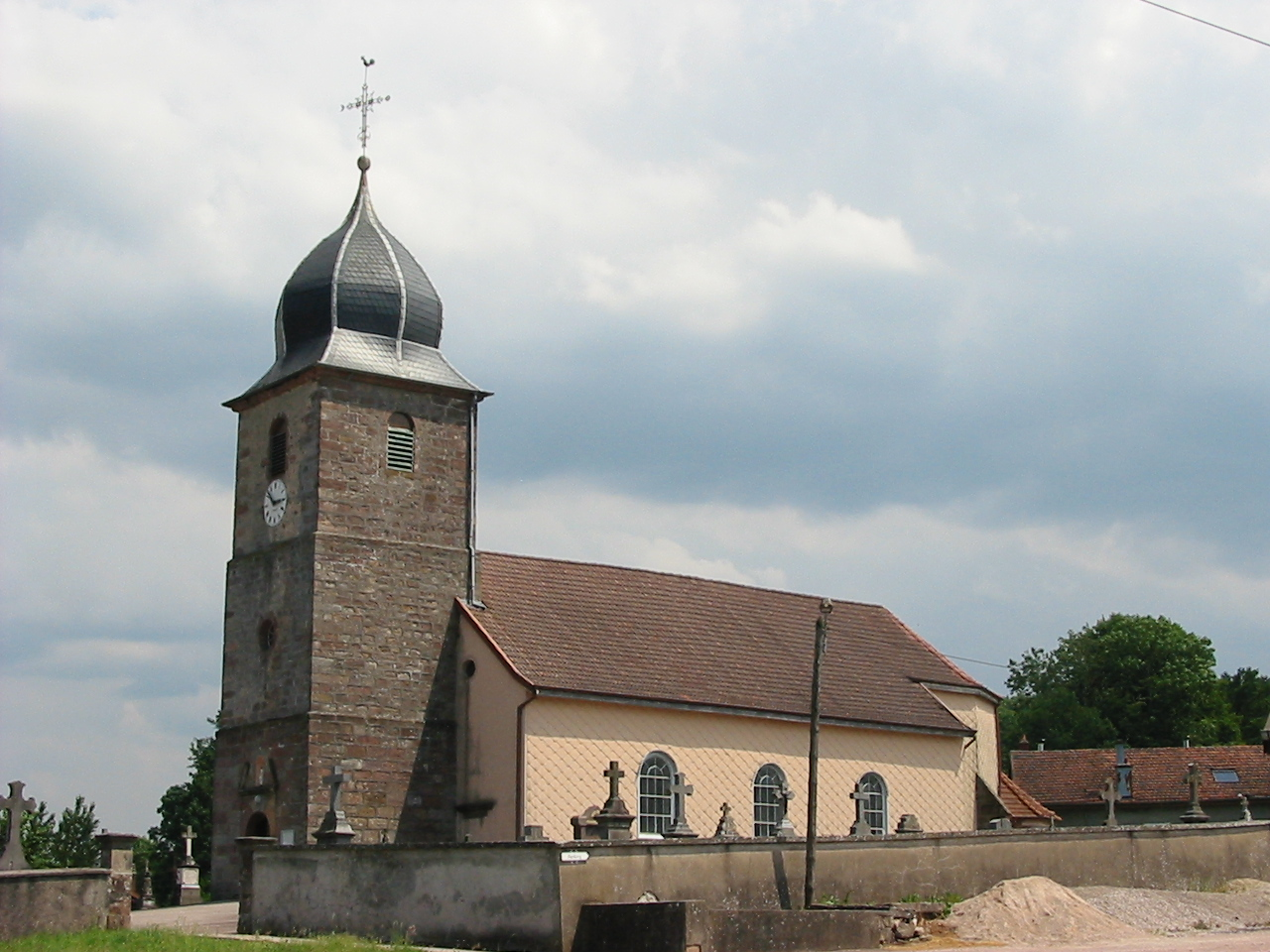
- The church in La Chapelle-devant-Bruyères

- Coat of arms
- Location of La Chapelle-devant-Bruyères
- Location within France Location within Grand Est
- Coordinates: 48°11′10″N 6°47′21″E
- Country: France
- Region: Grand Est
- Department: Vosges
- Arrondissement: Saint-Dié-des-Vosges
- Canton: Gérardmer
- Intercommunality: CA Saint-Dié-des-Vosges

Government
  - Mayor (2020–2026): Jacques Valance
- Area^{1}: 20.23 km^{2} (7.81 sq mi)
- Elevation: 453 m (1,486 ft)
- Highest elevation: 768 m (2,520 ft)
- Lowest elevation: 447 m (1,467 ft)
- Population (2023): 547
  - Density: 27.0/km^{2} (70.0/sq mi)
- Time zone: UTC+01:00 (CET)
  - Summer (DST): UTC+02:00 (CEST)
- INSEE/Postal code: 88089 /88600
- ^{1} French Land Register data, which excludes lakes, ponds, glaciers > 1 km^{2} (0.386 sq mi or 247 acres) and river estuaries.

La Chapelle-devant-Bruyères (French pronunciation: [la ʃapɛl dəvɑ̃ bʁɥijɛʁ]; literally "The Chapel before Bruyères") is a commune in the Vosges department in Grand Est in northeastern France.

== See also ==
- Communes of the Vosges department
