= Ban-sur-Meurthe-Clefcy =

- Commune
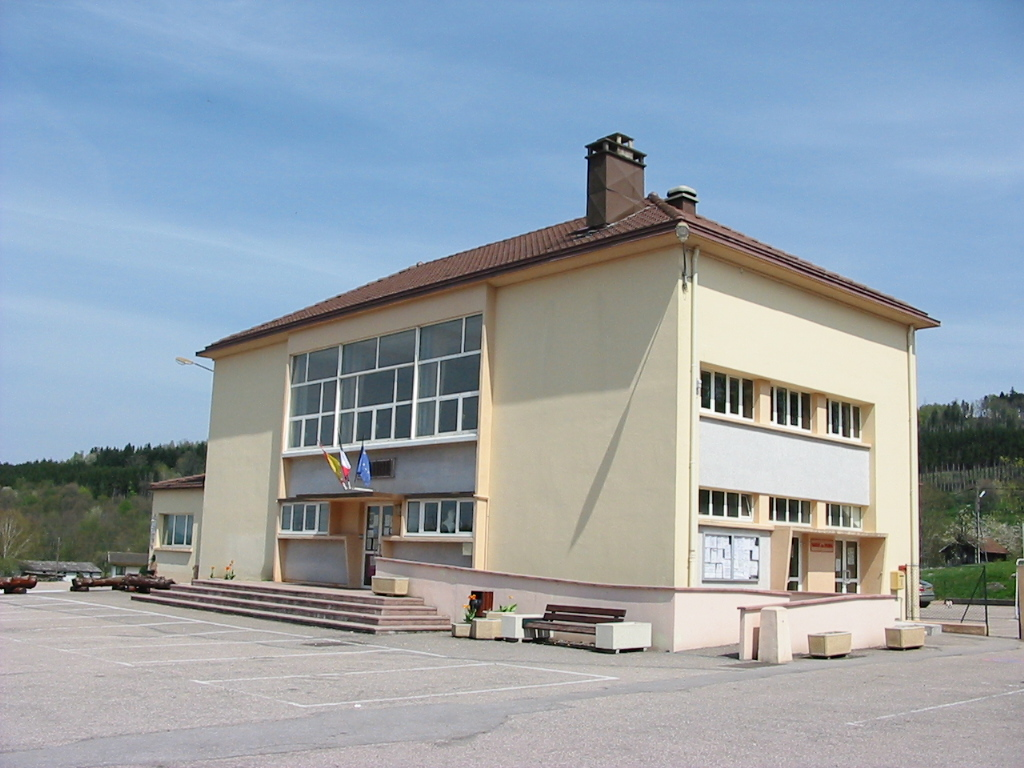
- Town hall

- Coat of arms
- Location of Ban-sur-Meurthe-Clefcy
- Location within France Location within Grand Est
- Coordinates: 48°10′24″N 6°58′48″E
- Country: France
- Region: Grand Est
- Department: Vosges
- Arrondissement: Saint-Dié-des-Vosges
- Canton: Gérardmer
- Intercommunality: CA Saint-Dié-des-Vosges

Government
  - Mayor (2020–2026): Sylvia Didierdefresse
- Area^{1}: 45.04 km^{2} (17.39 sq mi)
- Elevation: 478 m (1,568 ft)
- Highest elevation: 1,143 m (3,750 ft)
- Lowest elevation: 455 m (1,493 ft)
- Population (2023): 957
  - Density: 21.2/km^{2} (55.0/sq mi)
- Time zone: UTC+01:00 (CET)
  - Summer (DST): UTC+02:00 (CEST)
- INSEE/Postal code: 88106 /88230
- Website: www.ban-sur-meurthe-clefcy.com
- ^{1} French Land Register data, which excludes lakes, ponds, glaciers > 1 km^{2} (0.386 sq mi or 247 acres) and river estuaries.

Ban-sur-Meurthe-Clefcy (French pronunciation: [bɑ̃ syʁ mœʁt klɛfsi]) is a commune in the Vosges department in Grand Est in northeastern France.

== See also ==
- Communes of the Vosges department
