= Biffontaine =

- Commune
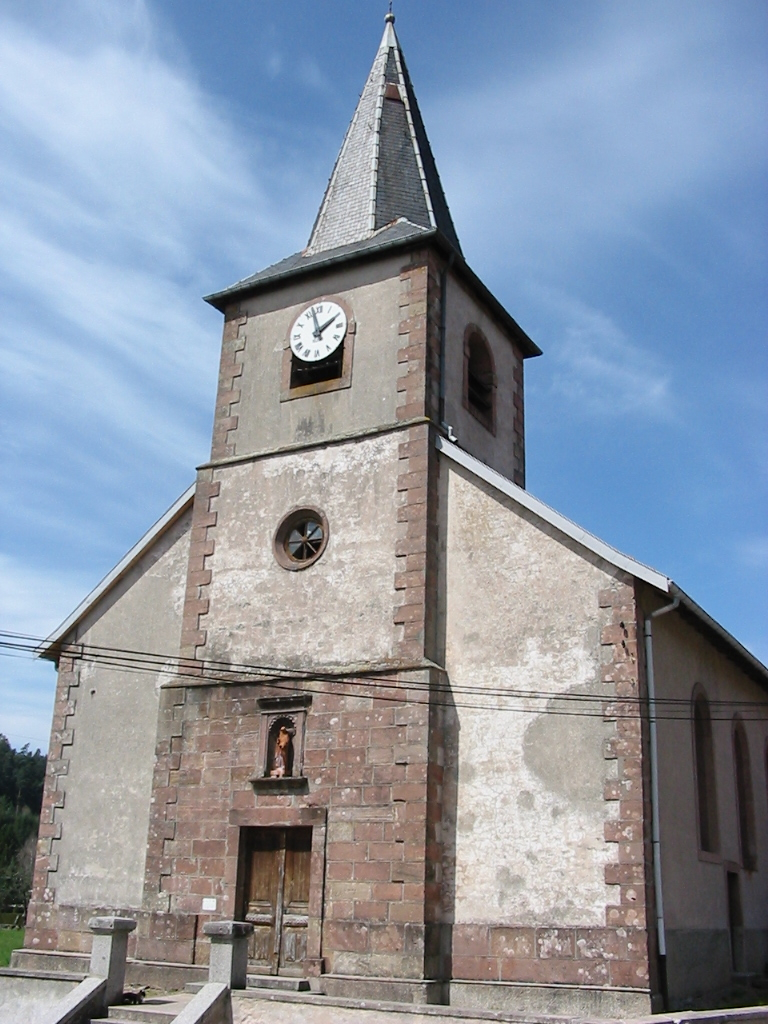
- The church in Biffontaine

- Coat of arms
- Location of Biffontaine
- Location within France Location within Grand Est
- Coordinates: 48°12′43″N 6°48′18″E
- Country: France
- Region: Grand Est
- Department: Vosges
- Arrondissement: Saint-Dié-des-Vosges
- Canton: Bruyères
- Intercommunality: CA Saint-Dié-des-Vosges

Government
  - Mayor (2020–2026): Denis Henry
- Area^{1}: 8.88 km^{2} (3.43 sq mi)
- Elevation: 465 m (1,526 ft)
- Highest elevation: 660 m (2,170 ft)
- Lowest elevation: 456 m (1,496 ft)
- Population (2023): 390
  - Density: 44/km^{2} (110/sq mi)
- Time zone: UTC+01:00 (CET)
  - Summer (DST): UTC+02:00 (CEST)
- INSEE/Postal code: 88059 /88430
- ^{1} French Land Register data, which excludes lakes, ponds, glaciers > 1 km^{2} (0.386 sq mi or 247 acres) and river estuaries.

Biffontaine (French pronunciation: [bifɔ̃tɛn]) is a commune in the Vosges department in Grand Est in northeastern France.

== History ==
In the World War II, it was liberated from German occupation by soldiers of the Japanese-American 442nd Regimental Combat Team in late October 1944, who then defended it from fierce counterattacks. It is perhaps best known as being near the location of the rescue of the "Lost Battalion" of soldiers from 1st Battalion, 141st Regiment, 36th Infantry Division, who had been surrounded by German forces but were rescued by the 442nd.

== See also ==
- Communes of the Vosges department
