= Corcieux =

- Commune
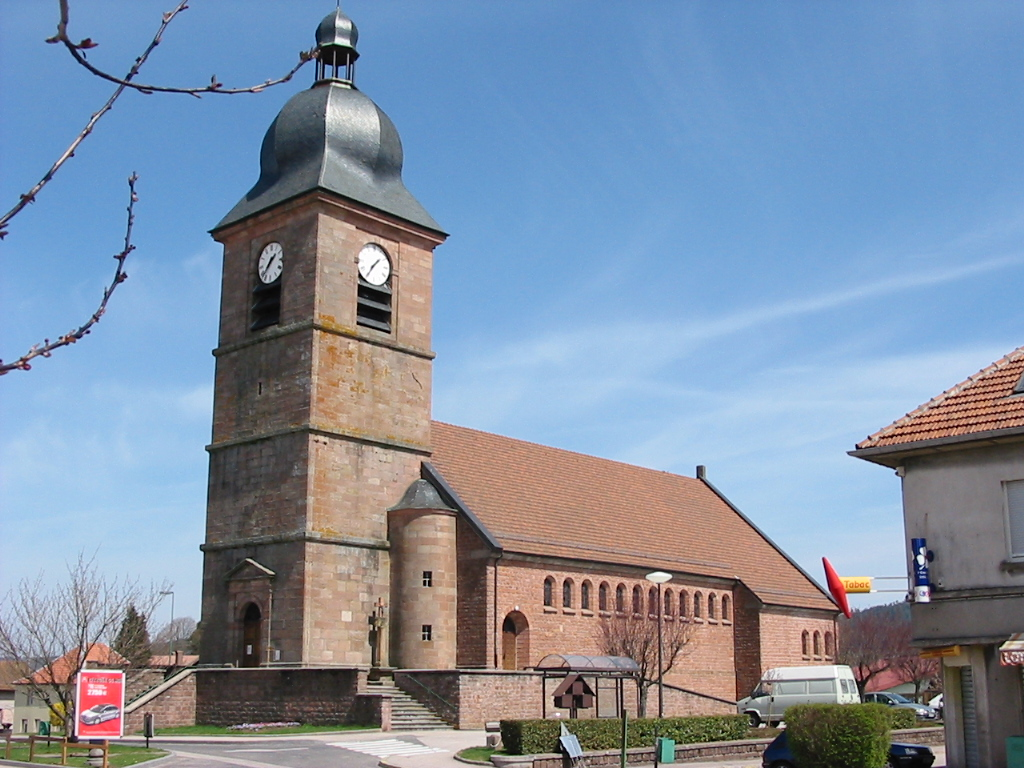
- The church in Corcieux

- Flag Coat of arms
- Location of Corcieux
- Location within France Location within Grand Est
- Coordinates: 48°10′23″N 6°52′49″E
- Country: France
- Region: Grand Est
- Department: Vosges
- Arrondissement: Saint-Dié-des-Vosges
- Canton: Gérardmer
- Intercommunality: CA Saint-Dié-des-Vosges

Government
  - Mayor (2020–2026): Christian Caël
- Area^{1}: 17.4 km^{2} (6.7 sq mi)
- Elevation: 550 m (1,800 ft)
- Highest elevation: 730 m (2,400 ft)
- Lowest elevation: 503 m (1,650 ft)
- Population (2023): 1,509
  - Density: 86.7/km^{2} (225/sq mi)
- Time zone: UTC+01:00 (CET)
  - Summer (DST): UTC+02:00 (CEST)
- INSEE/Postal code: 88115 /88430
- ^{1} French Land Register data, which excludes lakes, ponds, glaciers > 1 km^{2} (0.386 sq mi or 247 acres) and river estuaries.

Corcieux (French pronunciation: [kɔʁsjø]) is a commune in the Vosges department in Grand Est in northeastern France.

== See also ==
- Communes of the Vosges department
