= Provenchères-et-Colroy =

- Commune
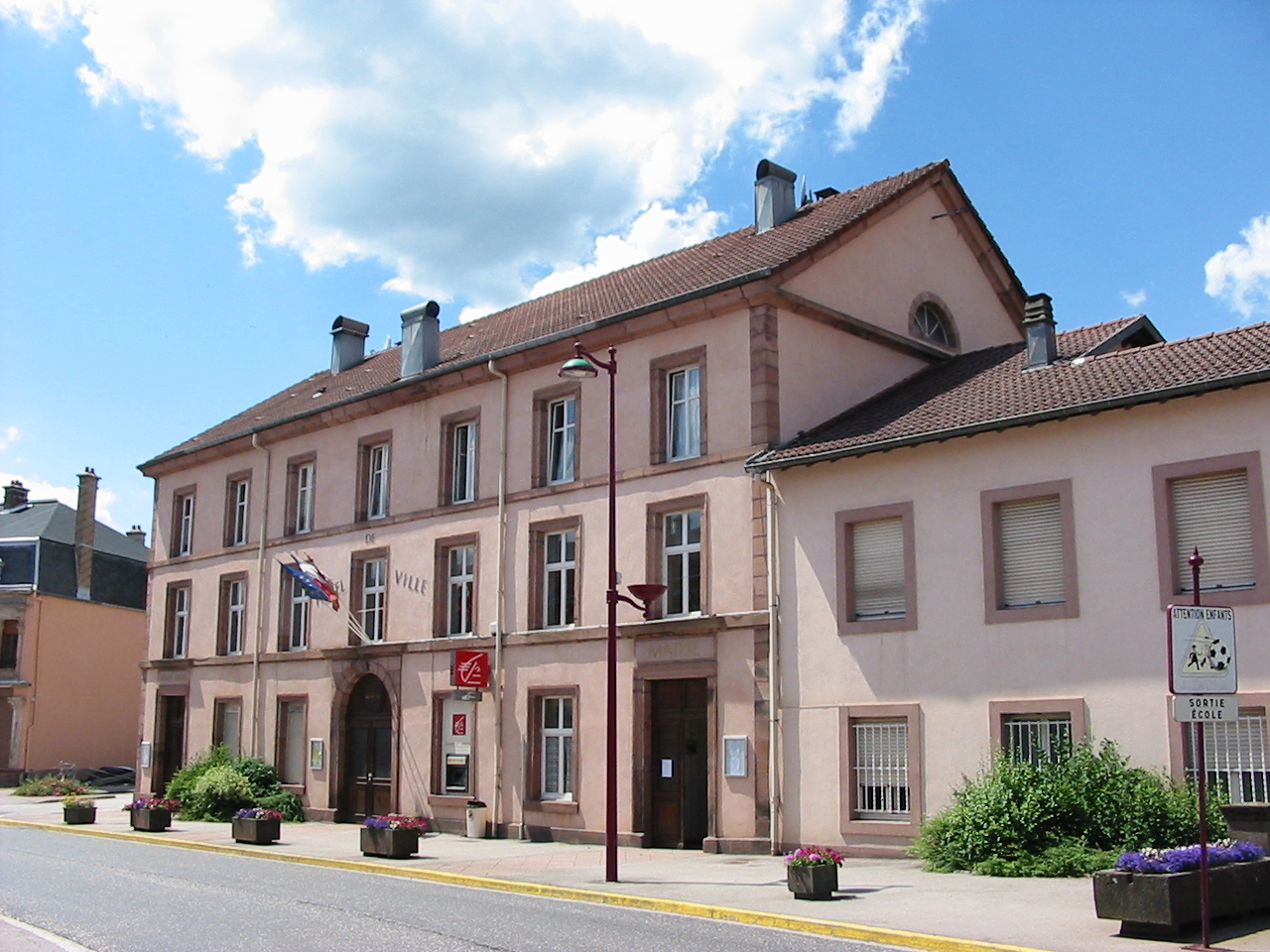
- The town hall in Provenchères-sur-Fave

- Coat of arms
- Location of Provenchères-et-Colroy
- Location within France Location within Grand Est
- Coordinates: 48°18′29″N 7°04′48″E
- Country: France
- Region: Grand Est
- Department: Vosges
- Arrondissement: Saint-Dié-des-Vosges
- Canton: Saint-Dié-des-Vosges-2
- Intercommunality: CA Saint-Dié-des-Vosges

Government
  - Mayor (2020–2026): Steeves Brenet
- Area^{1}: 19.13 km^{2} (7.39 sq mi)
- Population (2023): 1,283
  - Density: 67.07/km^{2} (173.7/sq mi)
- Time zone: UTC+01:00 (CET)
  - Summer (DST): UTC+02:00 (CEST)
- INSEE/Postal code: 88361 /88490
- ^{1} French Land Register data, which excludes lakes, ponds, glaciers > 1 km^{2} (0.386 sq mi or 247 acres) and river estuaries.

Provenchères-et-Colroy (French pronunciation: [pʁɔvɑ̃ʃɛʁ e kɔlʁwa]) is a commune in the Vosges department of northeastern France. The municipality was established on 1 January 2016 and consists of the former communes of Colroy-la-Grande and Provenchères-sur-Fave.

== See also ==
- Communes of the Vosges department
