= Colroy-la-Grande =

- Part of Provenchères-et-Colroy
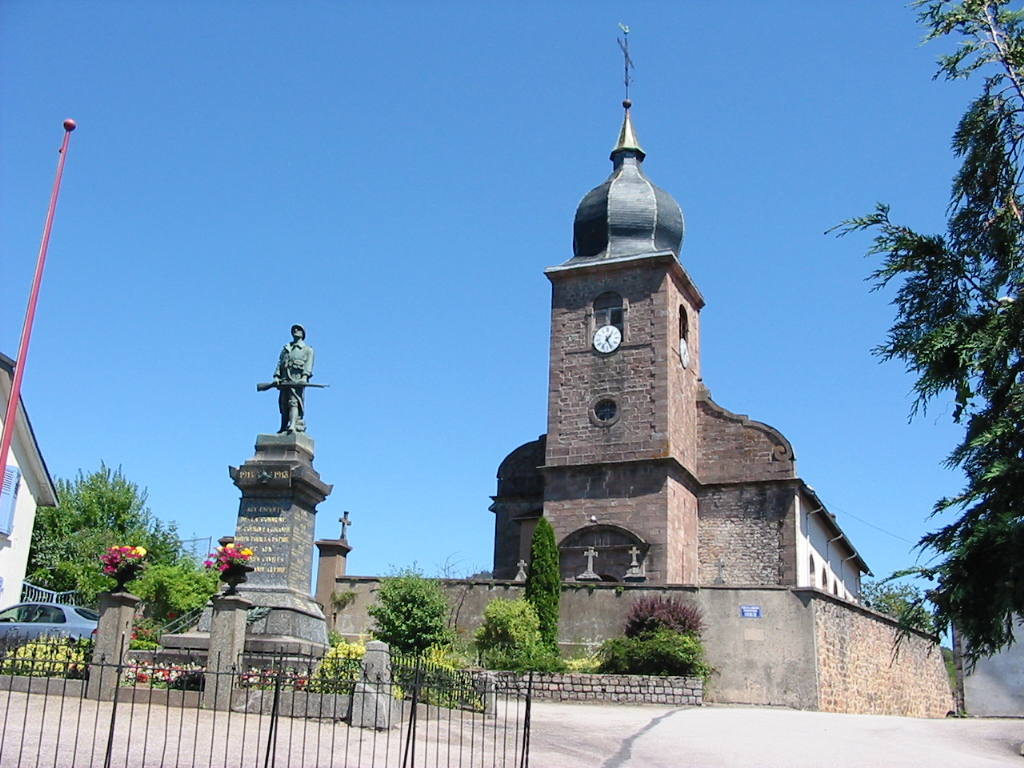

- Coat of arms
- Location of Colroy-la-Grande
- Location within France Location within Grand Est
- Coordinates: 48°19′01″N 7°06′46″E
- Country: France
- Region: Grand Est
- Department: Vosges
- Arrondissement: Saint-Dié-des-Vosges
- Canton: Saint-Dié-des-Vosges-2
- Commune: Provenchères-et-Colroy
- Area^{1}: 11.86 km^{2} (4.58 sq mi)
- Elevation: 453 m (1,486 ft)
- Highest elevation: 790 m (2,590 ft)
- Lowest elevation: 408 m (1,339 ft)
- Population (2022): 479
  - Density: 40.4/km^{2} (105/sq mi)
- Time zone: UTC+01:00 (CET)
  - Summer (DST): UTC+02:00 (CEST)
- Postal code: 88490
- ^{1} French Land Register data, which excludes lakes, ponds, glaciers > 1 km^{2} (0.386 sq mi or 247 acres) and river estuaries.

Colroy-la-Grande (French pronunciation: [kɔlʁwa la ɡʁɑ̃d]) is a former commune in the Vosges department in northeastern France. On 1 January 2016, it was merged into the new commune Provenchères-et-Colroy.

== See also ==
- Communes of the Vosges department
